= Joan Osborne discography =

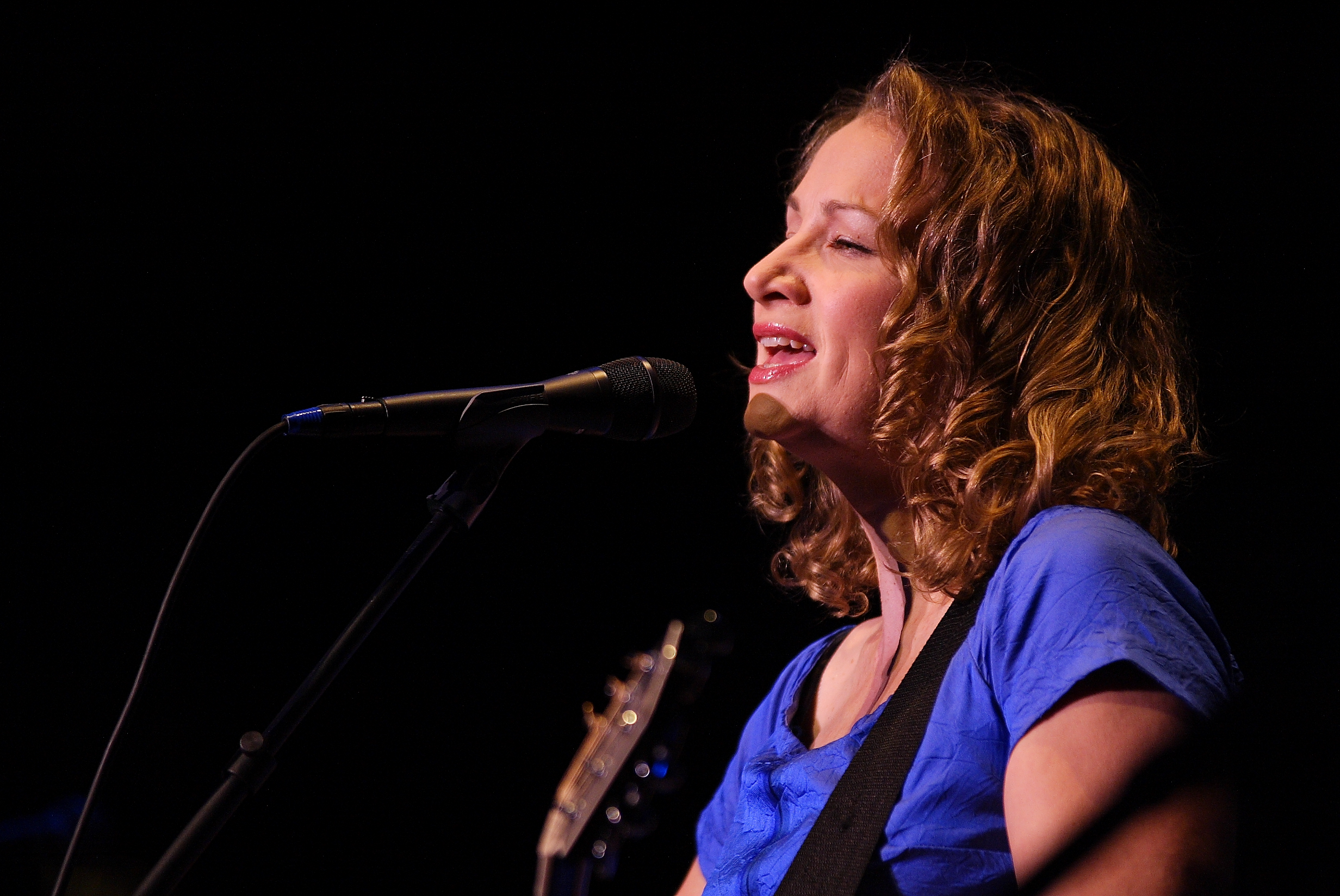
- Osborne performing in 2009
- Studio albums: 10
- Live albums: 2
- Compilation albums: 3
- Singles: 11

This is a list of albums and singles recorded by American musician Joan Osborne.

== Albums ==
=== Studio albums ===
Title	Album details	Peak chart positions										Certifications (sales threshold)
Title	Album details	US	US Country	US Indie	AUS	CAN	FIN	NZ	SWE	SWI	UK	Certifications (sales threshold)
Relish	Release date: March 21, 1995; Label: Blue Gorilla, Mercury, Polydor; Formats: CD, cassette	9	—	—	12	5	14	13	6	18	5	RIAA: 3× Platinum; ARIA: Gold; BPI: Gold; MC: Platinum
Righteous Love	Release date: September 12, 2000; Label: Interscope; Formats: CD, cassette	90	—	—	—	—	—	—	—	—	—	
How Sweet It Is	Release date: September 17, 2002; Label: Compendia; Formats: CD	—	—	19	—	—	—	—	—	—	—	
Christmas Means Love	Release date: October 18, 2005; Label: Time Life Music; Formats: CD, music download	—	—	—	—	—	—	—	—	—	—	
Pretty Little Stranger	Release date: November 13, 2006; Label: Vanguard; Formats: CD, music download	—	58	34	—	—	—	—	—	—	—	
Breakfast in Bed	Release date: May 22, 2007; Label: Time Life Music; Formats: CD, music download	160	—	—	—	—	—	—	—	—	—	
Little Wild One	Release date: September 9, 2008; Label: Saguaro Road; Formats: CD, music download	193	—	—	—	—	—	—	—	—	—	
Bring It On Home	Release date: March 26, 2012; Label: Saguaro Road; Formats: CD, music download	154	—	—	—	—	—	—	—	—	—	
Love and Hate	Release date: April 8, 2014; Label: Membran; Formats: CD, music download	—	—	—	—	—	—	—	—	—	—	
Songs of Bob Dylan	Release date: September 1, 2017; Label: Womanly Hips; Formats: CD, music download	—	—	—	—	—	—	—	—	—	—	
Trouble and Strife	Release date: September 18, 2020; Label: Womanly Hips; Formats: CD, music download	—	—	—	—	—	—	—	—	—	—	
Nobody Owns You	Release date: September 8, 2023; Label: Womanly Hips; Formats: CD, music download	—	—	—	—	—	—	—	—	—	—	
"—" denotes releases that did not chart or were not released to that country

=== Compilation albums ===
Title	Album details
One of Us	Release date: June 28, 2005; Label: Artemis; Formats: CD, music download
20th Century Masters: The Best of Joan Osborne	Release date: July 24, 2007; Label: Hip-O; Formats: CD, music download
Radio Waves	Release date: February 18, 2022; Label: Formats: CD, music download

=== Live albums ===
Title	Album details
Soul Show: Live at Delta 88	Release date: 1991; Label: Womanly Hips; Formats: CD, cassette
Early Recordings	Release date: November 5, 1996; Label: Mercury; Formats: CD, cassette
Dylanology Live	Release date: April 25, 2025; Label: Womanly Hips; Formats: CD, Music Download

=== Deluxe editions ===
Title	Album details
Relish: 20th Anniversary Edition	2 bonus tracks, 2 demo tracks, and 4 live tracks: Release date: 2015; Label: Def Jam / Island

=== Albums with Trigger Hippy ===
Title	Album details
Trigger Hippy	Release date: September 30, 2014; Label: Rounder; Formats: CD, music download

== Singles ==
Year	Title	Peak chart positions										Certifications (sales threshold)	Album
Year	Title	US	US AC	US Adult	US Pop	US Mod	AUS	CAN	CAN AC	NZ	UK	Certifications (sales threshold)	Album
1995	"One of Us"	4	20	16	2	7	1	1	5	11	6	RIAA: Gold; ARIA: Platinum	Relish
1996	"St. Teresa"	—	15	—	—	—	43	69	42	38	33		Relish
1996	"Right Hand Man"	—	—	—	—	—	—	41	—	—	—		Relish
1997	"Ladder"	—	—	—	—	—	—	—	—	—	—		Relish
2000	"Safety in Numbers"	—	—	—	—	—	—	—	—	—	—		Righteous Love
2000	"Running Out of Time"	—	—	—	—	—	—	—	—	—	—		Righteous Love
2001	"Love Is Alive"	—	—	—	—	—	—	—	—	—	—		Righteous Love
2007	"I've Got to Use My Imagination"^{[A]}	—	—	—	—	—	—	—	—	—	—		Breakfast in Bed
2008	"Sweeter Than the Rest"	—	—	—	—	—	—	—	—	—	—		Little Wild One
2012	"Shake Your Hips"	—	—	—	—	—	—	—	—	—	—		Bring It On Home
2014	"Thirsty for My Tears"	—	—	—	—	—	—	—	—	—	—		Love and Hate
"—" denotes releases that did not chart or were not released to that country

Notes

- A "I've Got to Use My Imagination" peaked at number 27 on the US Billboard Jazz Songs chart.
