= Trouble and Strife =

Studio album by Joan Osborne
- Released: September 18, 2020
- Studios: Window Well Studios, Brooklyn, New York City, New York, United States; Love Circle, Nashville, Tennessee, United States ("Meat and Potatoes")
- Genres: Rock, soul
- Length: 43:23
- Language: English
- Labels: Thirty Tigers, Womanly Hips
- Producers: Joan Osborne (all tracks, except "Meat and Potatoes"); Nick Govrick ("Meat and Potatoes")

Joan Osborne chronology
Songs of Bob Dylan (2017)	Trouble and Strife (2020)	Radio Waves (2022)

Trouble and Strife is a 2020 studio album by American singer-songwriter Joan Osborne. The album has received positive reviews for critics with the music blending varieties of genres and interweaving political and personal themes in the lyrics.

== Recording and release ==
I needed to respond to this moment in our country’s history. I’m a citizen and I can do a lot of things that any other citizen could do, but I’m also somebody who makes music and there’s something about the power of music that I think can be very useful to us in this moment. I felt like it was part of my responsibility as someone who can do something, who has a platform, who has a certain amount of privilege. I need to use that in order to try to create some kind of positive change…

— Osborne on the impetus for writing new material for Trouble and Strife

Trouble and Strife is a collection of new material from Osborne, who had previously released two albums of covers (Bring It on Home in 2012 and Songs of Bob Dylan in 2017) as well as a concept album that took several years to complete (2014's Love and Hate). The singer decided to go to the studio to make a new album, but only decided days before the sessions started that it would be made up of new material rather than covers. She ultimately decided to showcase her songwriting skills and perform original work that touches on larger political themes or social issues such as gender non-conformity and immigration, but which she considers very personal.

== Reception ==
The editors of AllMusic Guide scored Trouble and Strife four out of five stars, with reviewer Mark Deming praising Osborne's ability to shift genres and at "every turn she sounds assured and fully in charge, as if she was born to sing it all". In American Songwriter, Lee Zimmerman gave Trouble and Strife four out of five stars for performing "soulful grooves" that "tackl[e] tough subjects that are solidly in sync with the nation’s turmoil and tension, polarized politics and continuing cultural divide". Jeff Tamarkin of Relix also praised the singer's ability to shift genres while "tying her 10 diverse new tunes together with a sense of purpose and single-mindedness". In Glide Magazine, John Moore praised Osborne for mixing the poignant and the political, calling this the "most politically minded album of her career". David Cheal of The Financial Times rated Trouble and Strife four out of five stars, noting Osborne's history of activism, which "brings a different kind of spirit to a genre [rock music] that is more conventionally devoted to pursuits such as drinking and partying".

== Track listing ==
All songs written by Joan Osborne, except where noted

1. "Take It Any Way I Can Get It" – 4:06
2. "What's That You Say" – 4:23
3. "Hands Off" – 4:21
4. "Never Get Tired (Of Loving You)" (Keith Cotton and Osborne) – 5:05
5. "Trouble and Strife" – 4:05
6. "Whole Wide World" – 5:03
7. "Meat and Potatoes" (Nick Govrick and Osborne) – 4:03
8. "Boy Dontcha Know" – 4:21
9. "That Was a Lie" – 3:40
10. "Panama" – 4:16

== Personnel ==
- Joan Osborne – lead vocals; hand claps on "Panama"; backing vocals on "What's That You Say", "Whole Wide World", "Meat and Potatoes", and "Panama"; loop station on "Panama"; production on all tracks except "Meat and Potatoes"; artwork
- Keith Brogdon – cover layout
- Andrew Carillo – electric guitar on "Take It Any Way I Can Get It", "What's That You Say", "Never Get Tired (Of Loving You)", "Whole Wide World", "Boy Dontcha Know", "That Was a Lie", and "Panama"; acoustic guitar on "Hands Off"; electric sitar on "Whole Wide World"; mando guitar on "Boy Dontcha Know"
- Aaron Comess – drums on all tracks except "Meat and Potatoes", percussion on "Take It Any Way I Can Get It", "What's That You Say", "Never Get Tired (Of Loving You)", "Trouble and Strife", "Whole Wide World", "Boy Dontcha Know", and "Panama"
- Nels Cline – guitar on "What's That You Say", "Trouble and Strife", "That Was a Lie", and "Panama"
- Keith Cotton – Wurlitzer on "Take It Any Way I Can Get It", "Hands Off", "Trouble and Strife", "Whole Wide World", and "That Was a Lie"; Rhodes piano on "What's That You Say" and "Never Get Tired (Of Loving You)"; Hammond B-3 on "What's That You Say", "Hands Off", "Trouble and Strife", and "That Was a Lie"; Prophet 6 on "Never Get Tired (Of Loving You)" and "That Was a Lie"; piano on "Boy Dontcha Know" and "Panama"; hand claps on "Panama"
- Alex DeTurk – mastering at The Bunker Studio
- Ada Dyer – backing vocals on "Take It Any Way I Can Get It", "Never Get Tired (Of Loving You)", and "That Was a Lie"
- Steve Gorman – drums on "Meat and Potatoes"
- Nick Govrick – synthesizer on "Meat and Potatoes", bass guitar on "Meat and Potatoes", guitar on "Meat and Potatoes", production on "Meat and Potatoes"
- Ross Gower – engineering on "Meat and Potatoes"
- Richard Hammond – bass guitar on all tracks except "Meat and Potatoes"
- John Jackson – guitar on "Meat and Potatoes"
- Audrey Martells – backing vocals on "What's That You Say" and "Boy Dontcha Know"
- Jack Petruzzelli – electric guitar on all tracks except "Meat and Potatoes", acoustic guitar on "Whole Wide World", slide guitar on "Trouble and Strife"
- Vance Powell – mixing on "Meat and Potatoes" at Sputnick
- Ana Maria Rea – spoken word passage on "What's That You Say"
- Martha Redbone – backing vocals on "What's That You Say" and "Boy Dontcha Know"
- Catherine Russell – backing vocals on "Take It Any Way I Can Get It", "Never Get Tired (Of Loving You)", and "That Was a Lie"
- Matt Shane – hand claps on "Panama", engineering on all tracks except "Meat and Potatoes", mixing on all tracks except "Meat and Potatoes"

== See also ==
- List of 2020 albums
