= One of Us =

One of Us may refer to:

== Film ==
- One of Us (1989 film) (Echad Mi'Shelanu), an Israeli film directed by Uri Barbash
- One of Us (2017 film), an American documentary directed by Heidi Ewing and Rachel Grady
- "One of us, one of us!", a line from the 1932 film Freaks

== Literature ==
- One of Us (Seierstad book), a 2013 book by Åsne Seierstad
- One of Us (novel), a 1998 novel by Michael Marshall Smith
- One of Us, a 2014 novel by Tawni O'Dell
- One of Us: Life of Margaret Thatcher, a 1989 book by Hugo Young
- One of Us: Richard Nixon and the American Dream, a 1991 book by Tom Wicker

== Music ==
=== Albums ===
- One of Us (Joan Osborne album) or the 1995 title song (see below), 2005
- One of Us (Pomegranates album) or the title song, 2010
- One of Us (Young Love album), 2009
- One of Us, by Mystery Skulls, or the title song, 2017
- One of Us, by James Barker Band, or the title song, 2025

=== Songs ===
- "One of Us" (ABBA song), 1981
- "One of Us" (Ava Max song), 2023
- "One of Us" (Joan Osborne song), 1995
- "One of Us" (Liam Gallagher song), 2019
- "One of Us", by Dawes from We're All Gonna Die, 2016
- "One of Us", by Brandon Flowers from Thrasher, 2026
- "One of Us", by Jagúar, 2005
- "One of Us", by Joey Badass from 2000, 2022
- "One of Us", by Martha Wainwright from Goodnight City, 2016
- "One of Us", by Matt Stell, 2022
- "One of Us", by Mayday Parade from Black Lines, 2015
- "One of Us", by New Politics from Lost in Translation, 2017
- "One of Us", by Rick Ross from Black Market, 2015
- "One of Us", by Wire from Object 47, 2008
- "One of Us", from the film The Lion King II: Simba's Pride, 1998
- "One of Us (Will Weep Tonight)", by Patti Page 1960

== Television ==
=== Series ===
- One of Us (TV series), a 2016 British drama miniseries

=== Episodes ===
- "One of Us" (The 4400), 2007
- "One of Us" (The Adventures of Jimmy Neutron: Boy Genius), 2006
- "One of Us" (Agents of S.H.I.E.L.D.), 2015
- "One of Us" (The Bill), 1998
- "One of Us" (The Ghost Squad), 2005
- "One of Us" (Lost), 2007
- "One of Us" (Mysterious Ways), 2001
- "One of Us" (Yes, Prime Minister), 1986
- "One of Us", an episode of M.K. 22, 2004
- "One of Us", an episode of The Newsroom, 2004

== Other uses ==
- One of Us, a 2013 European Citizens' Initiative

== See also ==
- Two of Us (disambiguation)
