= Songs of Bob Dylan =

Studio album by Joan Osborne
- Released: September 1, 2017
- Recorded: December 19–23, 2016
- Studios: Lake House, Pennsylvania, US; Turbinen, Randers, Denmark ("Tangled Up in Blue"); Window Well, Brooklyn, New York, US (backing vocals for "Tangled Up in Blue")
- Genre: Folk rock
- Length: 52:43
- Language: English
- Labels: Thirty Tigers, Womanly Hips
- Producers: Keith Cotton; Joan Osborne; Jack Petruzzelli

Joan Osborne chronology
Love and Hate (2014)	Songs of Bob Dylan (2017)	Trouble and Strife (2020)

Songs of Bob Dylan is a 2017 studio album by American singer-songwriter Joan Osborne, recorded in tribute to Bob Dylan. The album was met with positive reviews by critics.

== Recording and release ==
Songs of Bob Dylan continued a theme of covering and reinterpreting Dylan's music by Osborne, including changing musical style and the gender of the character in the narratives of the songs. She first recorded this set after being approached by Café Carlysle to do a residency and Osborne supported the album with a tour and cabaret show of Dylan's music that included songs from throughout his multi-decade career.

== Reception ==
The editorial staff of AllMusic Guide scored Songs of Bob Dylan four out of five stars, with reviewer Mark Deming writing that "she demonstrates she has a real knack for bringing his words to life", highlighting the emotional depth of her vocal performance. Hal Horowitz of American Songwriter gave this album four out of five stars, commenting on the diversity of Osborne's selections and her reinterpretations of Dylan's music, summing up that "she sheds new light on old material, exposes some seldom heard Dylan gems and proves once again how flexible and powerful his work remains". Hayden Benfield notes for Renowned for Sound that "a few of the tracks may arguably adhere too closely to the originals, bordering on imitation except for the vocals... it is clear how Osborne has earned her reputation as a deft cover artist when not performing originals" and praises the album's high quality.

== Track listing ==
All songs written by Bob Dylan, except where noted

1. "Tangled Up in Blue" – 5:43
2. "Rainy Day Women #12 & 35" – 4:05
3. "Buckets of Rain" – 3:55
4. "Highway 61 Revisited" – 4:19
5. "Quinn the Eskimo (The Mighty Quinn)" – 4:20
6. "Tryin' to Get to Heaven" – 4:26
7. "Spanish Harlem Incident" – 2:56
8. "Dark Eyes" – 4:02
9. "High Water (For Charley Patton)" – 3:53
10. "You're Gonna Make Me Lonesome When You Go" – 4:12
11. "Masters of War" (traditional and Jean Ritchie) – 4:23
12. "You Ain't Goin' Nowhere" – 3:15
13. "Ring Them Bells" – 3:13

== Personnel ==
"Tangled Up in Blue"'

- Joan Osborne – lead vocals, backing vocals, production
- Jim Boggia – electric guitar
- Keith Cotton – Wurlitzer electric piano, recording (backing vocals), additional engineering, production
- Michael Hartmann – acoustic guitar
- Glenn Ianaro – additional engineering, engineering assistance
- Pete Keppler – engineering
- Jay Mortaen – bass guitar
- John Bon Nielsen – recording
- Kent Olsen – drums, recording
- Jack Petruzzelli – engineering, production, executive production
- Matt Shane – additional engineering, mixing at Atomic Sound, New York City, New York, United States

"Rainy Day Women #12 & 35"'

- Joan Osborne – lead vocals, production
- Andrew Carillo – slide guitar
- Aaron Comess – drums
- Keith Cotton – piano, backing vocals, Hammond M-1 organ, additional engineering, production
- Richard Hammond – bass guitar
- Glenn Ianaro – additional engineering, engineering assistance
- Pete Keppler – engineering, mixing at The Treehouse, Lake Katonah, New York, United States
- Jack Petruzzelli – backing band, baritone guitar, percussion, engineering, production, executive production
- Matt Shane – additional engineering

"Buckets of Rain"'

- Joan Osborne – lead vocals, production
- Keith Cotton – piano, additional engineering, production
- Glenn Ianaro – additional engineering, engineering assistance, mixing at Interactive Sound
- Pete Keppler – engineering
- Jack Petruzzelli – acoustic guitar, engineering, production, executive production
- Matt Shane – additional engineering

"Highway 61 Revisted"'

- Joan Osborne – lead vocals, production
- Andrew Carillo – electric guitar
- Aaron Comess – drums
- Keith Cotton – Wurlitzer electric piano, additional engineering, production
- Richard Hammond – bass guitar
- Glenn Ianaro – additional engineering, engineering assistance
- Pete Keppler – engineering, mixing at The Treehouse, Lake Katonah, New York, United States
- Jack Petruzzelli – acoustic guitar, slide guitar, engineering, production, executive production
- Matt Shane – additional engineering

"Quinn the Eskimo (The Mighty Quinn)"'

- Joan Osborne – lead vocals, production
- Andrew Carillo – electric guitar
- Aaron Comess – drums
- Keith Cotton – piano, Hammond B-3 organ, hand claps, backing vocals, additional engineering, production
- Richard Hammond – bass guitar
- Glenn Ianaro – additional engineering, engineering assistance
- Pete Keppler – engineering, mixing at The Treehouse, Lake Katonah, New York, United States
- Audrey Martells – backing vocals
- Jack Petruzzelli – electric guitar, tambourine, hand claps, backing vocals, engineering, production, executive production
- Matt Shane – additional engineering
- Carl Spataro – hand claps

"Tryin' to Get to Heaven"'

- Joan Osborne – lead vocals, production
- Keith Cotton – piano, additional engineering, production
- Glenn Ianaro – additional engineering, engineering assistance, mixing at Interactive Sound
- Pete Keppler – engineering
- Jack Petruzzelli – electric guitar, tambourine, sleigh bells, engineering, production, executive production
- Matt Shane – additional engineering

"Spanish Harlem Incident"'

- Joan Osborne – lead vocals, backing vocals, production
- Andrew Carillo – electric guitar
- Aaron Comess – drums
- Keith Cotton – Wurlitzer electric piano, Hammond B-3 organ, backing vocals, additional engineering, production
- Richard Hammond – bass guitar
- Glenn Ianaro – additional engineering, engineering assistance
- Pete Keppler – engineering
- David Mann – tenor saxophone
- Jack Petruzzelli – acoustic guitar, engineering, production, executive production
- Matt Shane – additional engineering, mixing at Atomic Sound, New York City, New York, United States

"Dark Eyes"'

- Joan Osborne – lead vocals, production
- Keith Cotton – organ, additional engineering, production
- Glenn Ianaro – additional engineering, engineering assistance, mixing at Interactive Sound
- Pete Keppler – engineering
- Jack Petruzzelli – acoustic guitar, harmonium, Omnichord, engineering, production, executive production
- Matt Shane – additional engineering

"High Water (For Charley Patton)"'

- Joan Osborne – lead vocals, production
- Andrew Carillo – sitar
- Aaron Comess – drums
- Keith Cotton – piano, Wurlitzer electric piano, Hammond B-3 organ, Prophet 6 synthesizer, additional engineering, production
- Richard Hammond – bass guitar
- Glenn Ianaro – additional engineering, engineering assistance
- Pete Keppler – engineering
- Rich Pagano – mixing at New Calcutta Recording Studio, New York City, New York, United States
- Jack Petruzzelli – acoustic guitar, slide guitar, electric guitar, engineering, production, executive production
- Matt Shane – additional engineering

"You're Gonna Make Me Lonesome When You Go"'

- Joan Osborne – lead vocals, production
- Keith Cotton – piano, additional engineering, production
- Yair Evnine – cello
- Glenn Ianaro – additional engineering, engineering assistance
- Pete Keppler – engineering
- Rich Pagano – mixing at New Calcutta Recording Studio, New York City, New York, United States
- Jack Petruzzelli – acoustic guitar, engineering, production, executive production
- Matt Shane – additional engineering

"Masters of War"'

- Joan Osborne – lead vocals, production
- Keith Cotton – piano, additional engineering, production
- Cameron Greider – additional engineering
- Glenn Ianaro – additional engineering, engineering assistance
- Pete Keppler – engineering
- Jack Petruzzelli – acoustic guitar, engineering, production, executive production
- Matt Shane – additional engineering, mixing at Atomic Sound, New York City, New York, United States

"You Ain't Goin' Nowhere"'

- Joan Osborne – lead vocals, backing vocals, production
- Andrew Carillo – acoustic guitar
- Aaron Comess – drums
- Keith Cotton – piano, backing vocals, additional engineering, production
- Richard Hammond – bass guitar
- Glenn Ianaro – additional engineering, engineering assistance
- Pete Keppler – engineering
- Audrey Martells – backing vocals
- Jack Petruzzelli – acoustic guitar, mandolin, backing vocals, engineering, production, executive production
- Matt Shane – additional engineering, mixing at Atomic Sound, New York City, New York, United States
- Antoine Silverman – fiddle

"Ring Them Bells"'

- Joan Osborne – lead vocals, production
- Keith Cotton – piano, additional engineering, production
- Pete Keppler – engineering
- Glenn Ianaro – additional engineering, engineering assistance
- Jack Petruzzelli – Moog mini-synthesizer, engineering, production, executive production
- Matt Shane – additional engineering, mixing at Atomic Sound, New York City, New York, United States
- Antoine Silverman – violin

Technical personnel

- Dan Emery – etching on vinyl LP double album
- Fred Kervorkian – mastering at Welcome to 1979

== See also ==
- List of 2017 albums
