= One of Us (Joan Osborne album) =

Greatest hits album by Joan Osborne
- Released: June 28, 2005
- Genre: Rock
- Label: Artemis Nashville
- Producer: Various

Joan Osborne chronology
How Sweet It Is (2002)	One of Us (2005)	Christmas Means Love (2005)

One of Us is a greatest hits album by Joan Osborne, released in 2005.

== Track listing ==
1. "One of Us" (Eric Bazilian)
2. "How Sweet It Is" (Dozier, Holland, Holland)
3. "Why Can't We Live Together" (Thomas)
4. "Everybody Is a Star" (Stone)
5. "Smiling Faces Sometimes" (Strong, Whitfield)
6. "These Arms of Mine" (Redding)
7. "Right Hand Man" (Osborne, Bazillian, Chertoff, Hyman, Captain Beefheart)
8. "Only You Know and I Know" (Mason)
9. "Think" (Franklin, White)
10. "I'll Be Around" (Bell, Hurtt)
11. "Love's in Need of Love Today" (Wonder)
