= Radio Waves (Joan Osborne album) =

2022 compilation album by Joan Osborne

Compilation album and live album by Joan Osborne
- Released: February 22, 2022
- Recorded: 1995–2012
- Genre: R&B, rock
- Length: 52:52
- Language: English
- Label: Womanly Hips Records
- Producer: Joan Osborne

Joan Osborne chronology
Trouble and Strife (2020)	Radio Waves (2022)	Nobody Owns You (2023)

Radio Waves is a compilation album of live performances by American musician Joan Osborne, released in 2022. The album is composed of live performances of many of her most famous songs and cover versions across several years.

== Critical reception ==
Mark Montgomery French of PopMatters scored this album eight out of 10, calling Osborne "an artist of restless consistency" and stating that the album "hangs together beautifully as a complete work". In Relix, Jeff Tamarkin noted "the evolution of her writing skills through the years" that adds up to a "formidable collection". American Songwriter's Lee Zimmerman scored this album a 3.5 out of five and summed up his review, "Granted, Radio Waves is, in effect, a stopgap effort designed to buy time until Osborne can resume touring in earnest. Still, given that it’s a means of putting her skills back into the spotlight, it succeeds admirably." Writing for the Associated Press, Stephen Wine noted that Osborne is an "astute interpreter" of rhythm and blues and rock songs who is "creative in reimagining familiar tunes" with varied instrumentation and styles of performance.

== Track listing ==
1. "Saint Teresa" (KCRW, 1995) (Eric Bazilian, Rick Chertoff, and Joan Osborne) – 3:53
2. "My Love Is Alive" (KPRI, 2000) (George Kahn and Gary Wright) – 3:28
3. "Dream a Little Dream" (demo, 2005) (Fabian Andre and Wilbur Schwandt) – 3:44
4. "How Sweet It Is" (Radio Bremen, Germany, 2003) (Holland–Dozier–Holland) – 4:37
5. "Shake Your Hips" (WXPK, 2012) (James Moore) – 4:06
6. "One of Us" (Dutch radio, 2001) (Bazilian) – 4:27
7. "Real Love" (demo, 2006) (Toshi Reagon) – 3:21
8. "Little Wild One" (KBCO, 2008) (Bazilian, Rob Hyman, and Osborne) – 4:35
9. "Same Love That Makes Me Laugh" (The Loft – SiriusXM, 2012) (Bill Withers) – 5:29
10. "Make You Feel My Love" (Radio Bremen, Germany, 2002) (Bob Dylan) – 4:12
11. "Only You Know and I Know" (The Loft – Sirius XM, 2012) (Dave Mason) – 3:35
12. "Love's in Need of Love Today" (Radio Bremen, Germany, 2002) (Stevie Wonder) – 4:26
13. "Everybody Is a Star" (KROQ, 2002) (Sylvester Stewart) – 3:00

== Personnel ==
- Joan Osborne – lead vocals, production, liner notes
- Andrew Carillo – guitar on "My Love Is Alive", "Shake Your Hips", "One of Us", "Little Wild One", "Only You Know and I Know", "Love's in Need of Love Today", and "Everybody Is a Star"
- Aaron Comess – drums on "Shake Your Hips", "Same Love That Makes Me Laugh", "Only You Know and I Know", "Love's in Need of Love Today", and "Everybody Is a Star"
- Keith Cotton – keyboards on "Shake Your Hips", "Little Wild One", "Same Love That Makes Me Laugh"
- Erik Della Penna – guitar on "Saint Teresa"
- Richard Hammond – bass guitar on "Shake Your Hips", "Same Love That Makes Me Laugh"
- Rob Killenberger – engineering on "Real Love"
- Ivan Neville – keyboards on "Only You Know and I Know", "Love's in Need of Love Today", and "Everybody Is a Star"
- Rainy Orteca – bass guitar on "Saint Teresa")
- Jack Petruzzelli – mandolin on "Saint Teresa", backing vocals on "My Love Is Alive", guitar on "My Love Is Alive", "Dream a Little Dream", "Shake Your Hips", "Little Wild One", "Same Love That Makes Me Laugh", "Only You Know and I Know", "Love's in Need of Love Today", and "Everybody Is a Star"
- Gary Schreiner – keyboards, engineering, and loops on "Dream a Little Dream"
- Dean Sharenow – drums on "Saint Teresa"
- Billy Ward – drums on "My Love Is Alive"
- Tracy Wormworth – backing vocals on "My Love Is Alive", bass guitar on "My Love Is Alive", "Little Wild One", "Only You Know and I Know", "Love's in Need of Love Today", and "Everybody Is a Star"
