= Julian Coryell =

American musician

Julian Coryell (born 1973) is an American guitarist, singer, songwriter, and producer.

== Biography ==
Coryell was born in Pennsylvania in 1973 to famed jazz guitarist Larry Coryell and writer/actor /musician Julie Coryell, and grew up in Connecticut, New York and California. Coryell began playing the piano and drums at the age of 5, switched to violin at the age of 8, then to bass at the age of 13 to play and tour with his father, and by 15 had turned to the guitar. At the age of 16 he was accepted into Berklee College of Music on a full scholarship where he majored in performance and minored in songwriting. At the age of 18 he became the college’s youngest graduate. After playing country music in the Midwest for a year (with artists such as Loretta Lynn and The Osmonds), he moved to New York City, where he returned to jazz and pop music. There he worked as a session musician while he developed his singing and songwriting style with his modern rock trio The Moods. By 1997 Coryell was simultaneously signed to recording contracts with Universal Records, as a singer-songwriter, and N2K, as a jazz guitarist.

Coryell has been playing and recording music on a variety of instruments with musicians such as Carole King, Jewel, Alanis Morissette, and Aimee Mann. He has written with and toured with Americana chanteuse Madeleine Peyroux and has toured with Japanese rock legend Kazuya Yoshii (formerly of The Yellow Monkey). He has performed with Dave Brubeck and Billy Cobham among many others. He also was playing guitar and keyboard briefly in Jaye Muller's band in New York in the mid nineties. Coryell has produced legendary singer/songwriter Leonard Cohen, as well as acclaimed singer/songwriter Jim Boggia's Safe in Sound. In 2006 Coryell performed The Beatles entire White album in Los Angeles. In 2011 Coryell played guitar for the hit American television show The X Factor. He also contributed several tracks to the 2012 season of the show Mobbed on the Fox Network. He has taught at the Musicians Institute, as well as privately.

In addition to his solo career, Coryell's band CAST! (Coryell, Auger Sample Trio) regularly tours the United States and Europe promoting their albums and DVD. Coryell also has a recording studio partnership called West Triad along with rock drummer Mark Schulman (Pink, Cher) and engineer/producer Erich Gobel. Coryell continues to produce artists and is actively involved in song writing partnerships with a number of artists. He was a live guitarist on the Alanis Morissette Havoc and Bright Lights European Tour in 2012.

Coryell independently released his solo album Gaijin in 2011, which was originally intended for release in Japan. After the massive earthquake/tsunami Coryell's involvement in the tour was canceled and the record was released in the US with half the proceeds going to a Japanese relief organization.

== Discography ==
=== Solo albums ===
Gaijin (2011)

Profit and Loss (2009)

Undercovers (2006)

Rock Star (2004)

Bitter to Sweet (1999)

Duality (1997)

Without You (1996)

Jazzbo (1995)

=== Ensemble albums ===
Coryell, Auger Sample Trio (CAST!): Coolidge Returns (2008)

The Coryells (Larry, Murali and Julian Coryell): The Coryells (2000)

=== Guitarist (selected ) ===
Tao Of Sound – "These Times" (2016)

Kimm Rogers- Where The Pavement Grows (2015)

Leslie DiNicola- Wake Up (2014)

Leslie DiNicola- Some Greener Yard (2012)

Leslie DiNicola – Draw Back Your Bow (2011)

Phil Roy – In the Weird Small Hours (2009)

George Stanford – Big Drop (2008)

Curtis Peoples – Curtis Peoples (2008)

Kalan Porter – Wake Up Living (2008)

Kazuya Yoshii – Dragon Head Miracle (2008)

Phil Roy – The Great Longing (2008)

Kazuya Yoshii – Hummingbird in a Forest of Space (2007)

Jewel – Goodbye Alice in Wonderland (2006)

Kazuya Yoshii – 39108 (2006)

Emma Roberts – Unfabulous and More (2006)

Sierra Swan – Ladyland (2006)

Adam Cohen – Melancolista (2005)

Tremolo – Love is the Greatest Revenge (2005)

Aimee Mann – The Forgotten Arm (2005)

Alex Parks – Honesty (2005)

Jim Boggia – Safe in Sound (2005)

Michael Penn – Mr. Hollywood Jr., 1947 (2005)

Aimee Mann – Live at St. Ann's Warehouse (2004)

Marc Broussard – Carencro (2004)

Phil Roy – Issues + Opinions (2003)

The Webb Brothers – The Webb Brothers (2003)

Aimee Mann – Lost in Space (Special Edition) (2003)

Phil Roy – Grouchyfriendly (2000)

The Webb Brothers – Beyond the Biosphere (1999)

Adam Cohen – Adam Cohen (1998)

Larry Coryell – Sketches of Coryell (1996)

Changing Faces – Changing Faces (1994)

Cliff Eberhardt – Now You are My Home (1993)

Larry Coryell – Twelve Frets to One Octave (1991)

=== Producer ===
Kimm Rogers- Where The Pavement Grows (2015)

Leslie DiNicola- Wake Up (2014)

Leslie DiNicola- Some Greener Yard (2012)

Leslie DiNicola- Draw Back Your Bow (2011)

Jenni Alpert – No Second Guesses (2008)

Leonard Cohen – The Street (2006, unreleased)

Jim Boggia – Safe in Sound (2005)

=== Selected songwriting credits ===
Instead, co-written with singer Madeleine Peyroux (2009)

Homeless Happiness, co-written with singer Madeleine Peyroux (2009)

Live the Proof, co-written with singer Jim Boggia (2005)

=== Compilation albums ===
Parx-e – A Compilation of Independent Music (2008)

Covered (Songs by October Project) (2006)

Smooth and Straight (2000)
