= Two of Us =

Two of Us or The Two of Us may refer to:

== Film and television ==
- The Two of Us (1930 film), a Swedish film directed by John W. Brunius
- The Two of Us (1939 film), a Swedish film directed by Schamyl Bauman
- The Two of Us (1967 film), a French Holocaust related film directed by Claude Berri
- The Two of Us (2014 film), a South African film directed by Ernest Nkosi
- Two of Us (1987 film), a gay-themed British television film
- Two of Us (2000 film), an American television drama about a fictionalized meeting between Paul McCartney and John Lennon
- Two of Us (2019 film), a French film
- The Two of Us (1981 TV series), a sitcom starring Peter Cook and Mimi Kennedy
- The Two of Us (1986 TV series), a British comedy starring Nicholas Lyndhurst and Janet Dibley
- The Two of Us (2009 TV series) or Tayong Dalawa, a Filipino primetime drama series

== Music ==
=== Albums ===
- Two of Us (Azu album)
- Two of Us (Joseph Williams album)
- Two of Us, by Laboum, 2019
- Two of Us (Phil Keaggy and Mike Pachelli album)
- Two of Us (Tohoshinki album)
- The Two of Us (mixtape), by Chloe x Halle
- Two of Us (Robert Goulet album)
- The Two of Us (Sonny & Cher album)
- The Two of Us (Stafford and Macrae album)
- The Two of Us (Yabrough & Peoples album)
- The Two of Us, by Dinah Washington with Brook Benton, 1960
- The Two of Us, by Nancy Wilson with Ramsey Lewis 1984 pop #144, RnB #42

=== Songs ===
- "Two of Us" (Beatles song), by The Beatles, 1969
- "Two of Us" (Louis Tomlinson song), 2019
- "Two of Us" (Birds of Tokyo song), 2020
- "Two of Us" (Brett Kissel and Cooper Alan song), 2023
- "Two of Us", by Ayumi Hamasaki, a B-side of the single "Depend on You", 1998
- "Two of Us", by Girl's Day from Everyday II, 2012
- "Two of Us", by Supertramp from Crisis? What Crisis?, 1975
- "The Two of Us", by Jackie Trent and Tony Hatch, 1967
- "The Two of Us", by 'N Sync from Celebrity, 2001
- "The Two of Us", by S Club 7 from Stuart Little: Music from and Inspired by the Motion Picture, 1999
- "The 2 of Us", by Suede from Dog Man Star, 1994

== Other media ==
- The Two of Us (play), a 1970 play by Michael Frayn
- The Two of Us: My Life with John Thaw, a 2004 biography by Sheila Hancock

== See also ==
- Just the Two of Us (disambiguation)
- One of Us (disambiguation)
- Naam Iruvar (disambiguation) (lit. 'Two of Us' in Tamil), title of various Indian films
