= Oor =

Dutch music magazine

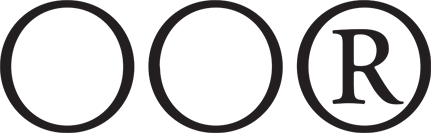
- Categories: Music magazine
- Frequency: Monthly
- Founder: Barend Toet
- Founded: 1 April 1971
- First issue: 1971; 55 years ago
- Country: Netherlands
- Language: Dutch
- Website: www.oor.nl

Oor is the oldest currently published music magazine in the Netherlands, founded in 1971. Oor is the Dutch word for ear. Until 1984, it was published as Muziekkrant Oor.

== History ==
The magazine was first published on 1 April 1971 as Muziekkrant Oor, being founded by Barend Toet. Toet used the United States' Rolling Stone and the United Kingdom's Melody Maker as examples to model Muziekkrant Oor after.

Of the first issue, 20,000 copies were printed and paid for by Berry Visser, one of the co-founders of Mojo Concerts. The magazine was sold to Levisson on 1 January 1972. In 1978, the magazine was bought by Elsevier. Throughout the 1970s and 1990s, Oor was seen as "the only source of information in the Netherlands when it came to 'serious' pop music", because other magazines only dealt with Top 40 pop and foreign magazines could only be purchased in large cities. Oor also received exclusive interviews with musicians such as Stevie Wonder, Bob Marley, Prince and Fela Kuti. The magazine's album reviews and concert schedules were a key part of its popularity.

Halfway through the 1990s, Oor was sold to the Telegraaf Media Group. In 2002, Oor was bought by Erik de Vlieger's Imca Media Group. Since 2006, Argo Media is the owner.

Originally, Oor was published as a newspaper, hence the word 'krant' in the name. From the 1980s onward, the word Muziekkrant was dropped from the title and Oor had become a magazine. In 2005 the publication frequency changed from bi-weekly to monthly.

In 2021, the book Want More? Het beste van 50 jaar Oor was published to celebrate the magazine's 50th anniversary. The crowdfunded goal of €22,500 was easily reached, and a total of €100,000 was raised on www.voordekunst.nl.

== Albums of the year ==
| Year | Artist | Album | Source |
|---|---|---|---|
| 1990 | Living Colour | Time's Up | |
| 1991 | Nirvana | Nevermind | |
| 1992 | Tom Waits | Bone Machine | |
| 1993 | The Lemonheads | Come on Feel the Lemonheads | |
| 1994 | Spearhead | Home | |
| 1995 | Oasis | (What's the Story) Morning Glory? | |
| 1996 | DJ Shadow | Endtroducing..... | |
| 1997 | Radiohead | OK Computer | |
| 1998 | Massive Attack | Mezzanine | |
| 1999 | Tom Waits | Mule Variations | |
| 2000 | Eminem | The Marshall Mathers LP | |
| 2001 | The Strokes | Is This It | |
| 2002 | Queens of the Stone Age | Songs for the Deaf | |
| 2003 | The White Stripes | Elephant | |
| 2004 | Franz Ferdinand | Franz Ferdinand | |
| 2005 | Antony and The Johnsons | I Am a Bird Now | |
| 2006 | Arctic Monkeys | Whatever People Say I Am, That's What I'm Not | |
| 2007 | Arctic Monkeys | Favourite Worst Nightmare | |
| 2008 | TV on the Radio | Dear Science | |
| 2009 | The xx | Xx | |
| 2010 | Arcade Fire | The Suburbs | |
| 2011 | PJ Harvey | Let England Shake | |
| 2012 | Alt-J | An Awesome Wave | |
| 2013 | Nick Cave and the Bad Seeds | Push the Sky Away | |
| 2014 | The War on Drugs | Lost in the Dream | |
| 2015 | Sufjan Stevens | Carrie & Lowell | |
| 2016 | David Bowie | Blackstar | |
| 2017 | LCD Soundsystem | American Dream | |
| 2018 | Janelle Monáe | Dirty Computer | |
| 2019 | Lana Del Rey | Norman Fucking Rockwell! | |
| 2020 | Eefje de Visser | Bitterzoet | |
| 2021 | Little Simz | Sometimes I Might Be Introvert | |
| 2022 | Big Thief | Dragon New Warm Mountain I Believe in You | |
| 2023 | Caroline Polachek | Desire, I Want to Turn Into You | |
| 2024 | Charli XCX | Brat | |
| 2025 | Rosalía | Lux | |
