= Phil Roy =

American singer and songwriter (born 1959)

- Born: February 28, 1959 (age 66); Philadelphia, Pennsylvania, U.S.
- Genres: Pop, rock
- Occupation(s): Singer, songwriter
- Instrument(s): Vocals, guitar
- Years active: 1981–present
- Website: philroy.com

Phil Roy (born February 28, 1959) is an American singer and songwriter.

== Biography ==
=== Early musical career ===
Roy was born in Philadelphia and began playing the guitar at age nine. At age 17, attended Berklee College of Music in Boston. He moved to Los Angeles in 1981 and was discovered on Sunset Boulevard by Ted Templeman, a music executive from Warner Bros. who is also responsible for discovering Van Halen, Little Feat, and the Doobie Brothers. He was a member of two rock bands in Los Angeles, but neither were successful.

=== Songwriting ===
Roy decided to leave the recording industry to become a songwriter. For fifteen years, he worked for numerous publishers with Ray Charles, Joe Cocker, The Neville Brothers, and Pops Staples. He also contributed songs to the soundtracks for As Good as It Gets and Leaving Las Vegas.

In 2007, Wyclef Jean recorded Roy's "Show Me the Way Home" for a film produced and narrated by Matt Damon.

He was the winner of the 9th Annual Independent Music Awards, for Best Concept Album; In The Weird Small Hours.

=== Solo efforts ===
Roy moved back east after becoming disillusioned with the industry. In January 2000, Roy released his solo debut album entitled Grouchyfriendly. He released this album on his own Ear Pictures label and his song "Melt" won in The 2nd Annual Independent Music Awards for best Folk/Singer-Songwriter Song. He was signed by OR Music after his first album performed well. In 2003, Roy released Issues + Options, his second solo album. Roy performed at the Lincoln Center to a sold-out crowd as part of the "America Songbook" series in January 2004.

In May 2008, Roy released his third album The Great Longing on the Decca Records/Universal Records label.

=== Culinary career ===
In 2004, Roy's record label terminated his contract and his marriage collapsed. In response to these setbacks, Roy began his "I'm Not Leaving the House" tour in November 2005. Operating out of his townhouse in Philadelphia with a table for sixteen, Roy provides home-cooked food and original songs for his diners on a monthly basis.

== Discography ==
- Grouchyfriendly (January 2000)
- Issues + Options (May 2003)
- The Great Longing (May 2008) – Cooking Vinyl Records
- In The Weird Small Hours (September 2009) – MRI/Megaforce Records

== Songwriting credits ==
- "God is Not Sleeping" and "Ain't No Better than You" by Mavis Staples
- "Tell Me Why" by Los Lonely Boys
- "The Simple Things" and "My Brother, My Brother" by Joe Cocker
- "My World" by Ray Charles
- "Hope in a Hopeless World" by Pops Staples
- "Demons", "Perfect" and "X-Ray Eyes" by Guster
- "Hope in a Hopeless World" by Widespread Panic
- "It Takes More", "Day To Day Thing", "Let My People Go", and "Good Song" by The Neville Brothers
- "Poor Man Cry", "Things Friend", "Vice Versa Love", and "Be Strong" by Barrington Levy
- "Hope in a Hopeless World" and "It Will Be You" by Paul Young
- "Hope in a Hopeless World" by Eric Bibb
- "Even If it Breaks My Heart Real" by Cliff Richard
- "Heaven Down Here" by Tuck & Patti
- "Beautiful As You", "Down She Goes", "Don't Mean Anything", "Quarterback", "Amazing", and "It's Alright" by Adam Cohen
- "Sister My Sister" and "That's the Difference" by Native
- "Died a Thousand Times" by Eddie Money
- "Don't Count Me Out" by Eric Martin
- "Best Place in the World" by Charles & Eddie
- "Be Where You Are" by Kim Stockwood
- "What Are We Waiting For" by Alannah Myles with Zucchero
- "Miracle" and "Push" by Morgan Heritage
- "Can't Hurt the Harvest", "I Don't Want to Know", and "September Rain" by Katey Sagal
- "Never Enough" by L.A. Guns
- "Will You Remember" by Eighth Wonder
- "Synchronize" by Appollonia
- "This Business of Love" by Domino

== Filmography ==
- Running the Sahara (2009) writer of "Show Me The Way Home" performed by Wyclef Jean
- Welcome to Hollywood (2000) – Writer and performer of "Refuse", "Busy Body", "Wool & Cotton", "The Blaster", "Berries for Sherry", "Tomorrow's Sun", "Round Up", "Move Away", and "The Searcher" and music supervisor
- Me, Myself, & Irene (2000) – Writer of "Happy Feeling"
- Love & Sex (2000) – Writer and performer of "It's Alright"
- I Still Know What You Did Last Summer (1998) – Writer of "How Do I Deal"
- As Good as It Gets (1997) – Writer and producer of "Everything My Heart Desires" and "My Only"
- I Know What You Did Last Summer (1997) – Writer of "Don't Mean Anything"
- Leaving Las Vegas (1995) – Writer of "Ridiculous"
- The Mask (1994) – Writer of "This Business of Love"
- The Meteor Man (1993) – Writer of "Is It Just Too Much"

== Selected co-writers ==
- Hans Zimmer
- Michael Kaman
- Heitor Pereira
- Bob Theile, Jr.
- Will Jennings
- John Shanks
- Shelly Peiken
- Dennis Matkosky
- Steven Alan Davis
- Simon Clime
- Gavin Greenaway
- Jeff Silbar
- Dillon O'Brian
- Julian Coryell
- Paul Carrack
- Glen Tillbrook
- Roy Hay
- Adam Cohen
- Cathy Dennis
