= Tom Bukovac =

American session musician and producer

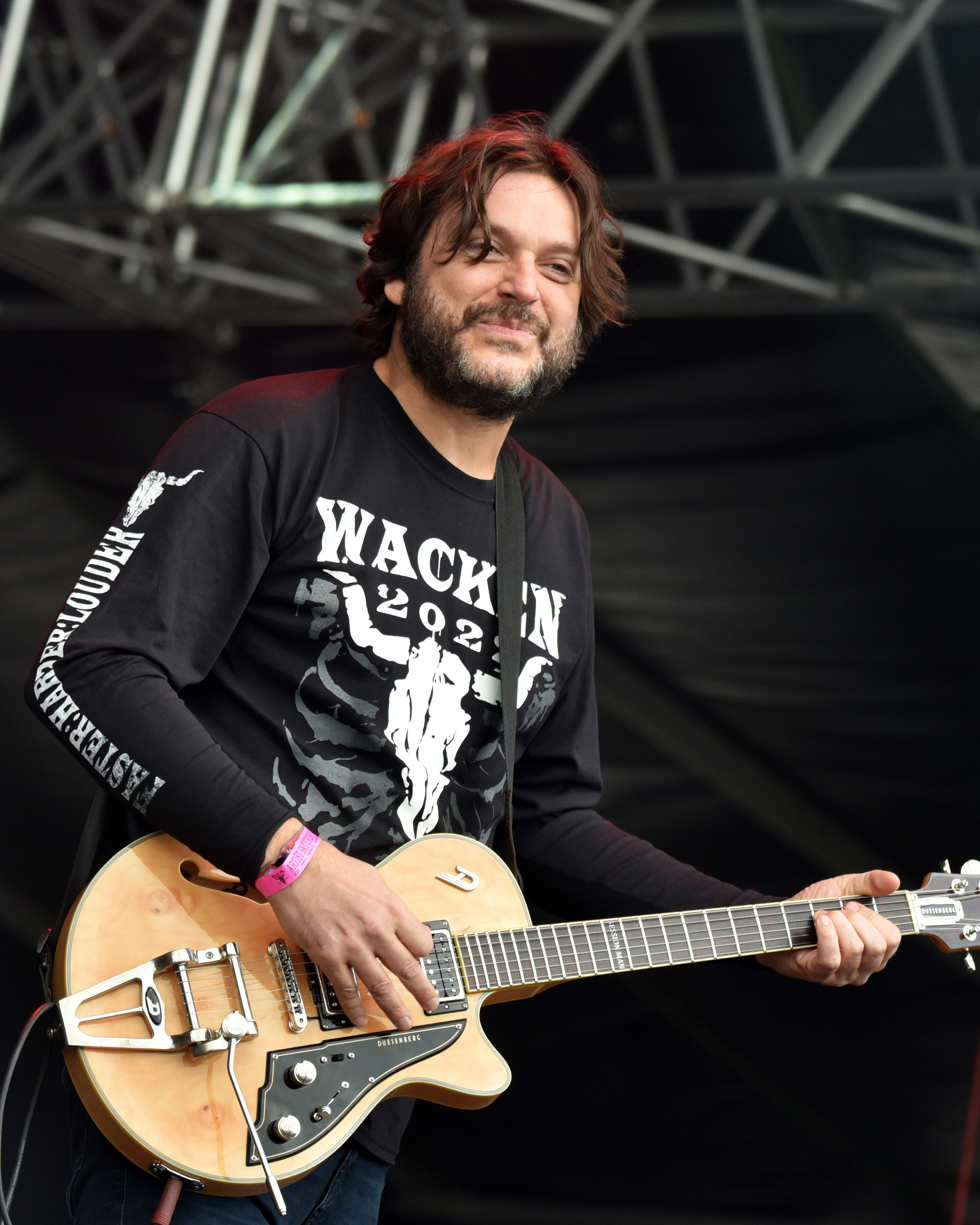
- Bukovac at Wacken Open Air with Ann Wilson in 2022

Background information
- Born: December 20, 1968 (age 57); Cleveland, Ohio, U.S.
- Genres: Rock; country
- Occupations: Musician; producer
- Instrument: Guitar
- Years active: 1980s–present
- Spouse: Sarah Buxton (m. 2010; div. 2020)
- Website: thesessionman.com

Tom Bukovac (born December 20, 1968) is an American session guitarist and producer.

He was born in Cleveland, Ohio, and raised in nearby Willowick, Ohio. He has been a Nashville-based musician since 1992. He previously owned 2nd Gear, a used music consignment shop in South Nashville.

== Career ==
Bukovac began playing guitar at age eight.

He moved to Nashville in 1992 to pursue a career as a guitarist and producer.

Bukovac has played on over 1,300 albums, including projects by Dan Auerbach and The Black Keys, Ella Langley, Morgan Wallen, Hermanos Gutierrez, Glen Campbell, Gwen Stefani, Kid Rock, Ann Wilson, The Struts, Steven Tyler, Stevie Nicks, Bob Seger, John Oates, Joan Osborne, Vince Gill, Dave Stewart, Joss Stone, Hank Williams Jr., Sheryl Crow, Don Henley, Carrie Underwood, Richard Marx, Rascal Flatts, Keith Urban, Willie Nelson, Martina McBride, Faith Hill, Kenny Loggins, Reba McEntire, Blake Shelton, LeAnn Rimes, Florida Georgia Line, Lionel Richie, Kelsea Ballerini, and many others.

Bukovac has toured with Vince Gill (2016, 2018, 2025), Ann Wilson (2022 - Fierce Bliss Tour), Joe Walsh (2017 - Tom Petty and the Heartbreakers 40th Anniversary Tour), John Fogerty (2000), Faith Hill, Trigger Hippy (2015), Wynonna Judd, Tanya Tucker, The Jim Irsay Band (2021-2023), and others.

=== Solo work ===
In 2014, Bukovac produced Trigger Hippy's self-titled album, which was released by Rounder Records. Featured on this album alongside Bukovac are Joan Osborne, Jackie Greene, Steve Gorman (of Black Crowes) and Nick Govrik.

He has made four records of his own material. A solo album called "Plexi Soul" (2021), a collaboration record with Dean Deleo from Stone Temple Pilots called "Trip The Witch" (2022), and a collaboration record with Guthrie Trapp called "In Stereo" (2023). He also made an acoustic record with Jedd Hughes and Guthrie Trapp in 2026 callled "Trifecta".

He also has a YouTube channel called "Homeskoolin'" that has over 134,000 subscribers.

== Personal life ==
In 2010, Bukovac married songwriter/artist Sarah Buxton. They have two children.

Bukovac and Buxton divorced in 2020.

== Awards and nominations ==
Academy of Country Music Awards Guitar Player Of The Year 4 time winner (2008, 2010, 2016, 2021)

Year	Category	Result
2004	Guitar Player of the Year	Nominee
2005	Top Guitar Player of the Year	Nominee
2006	Guitar Player of the Year	Nominee
2007	Top Guitarist of the Year	Nominee
2008	Top Guitarist of the Year	Winner
2010	Guitarist of the Year	Winner
2012	Guitarist of the Year	Nominee
2014	Guitar Player of the Year	Winner
2016	Guitarist of the Year	Winner
2021	Guitarist of the Year	Winner
2026	ACM Musician of year	Nominee
