= Naam Iruvar =

Naam Iruvar (lit. 'We Are Two' or 'Two of Us') may refer to:

- Naam Iruvar (1947 film), an Indian Tamil-language drama film by A. V. Meiyappan
- Naam Iruvar (1985 film), an Indian Tamil-language film

== See also ==
- Two of Us (disambiguation)
