= Safe in Sound (Jim Boggia album) =

Studio album by Jim Boggia
- Released: 2005
- Genre: Pop
- Length: 57:18
- Label: Bluhammock/Ingrooves
- Producer: Joe Zook, Julian Coryell

Safe in Sound is a 2005 studio album by pop singer-songwriter Jim Boggia. A track from the album, Live the Proof was featured in an ad for the 2008 BlackBerry campaign.

== Track listing ==
1. "Shine" (Jim Boggia, Michael Aharon) – 3:43
2. "Live the Proof" (Boggia, Julian Coryell) – 3:49
3. "Show My Face Around" (Boggia) – 5:24
4. "Underground" (Boggia) – 3:36
5. "Where's The Party" (Boggia) – 6:38
6. "Once" (Boggia) – 4:05
7. "Made Me So Happy" (Boggia) – 3:08
8. "Talk About the Weather" (Boggia) – 2:51
9. "Let Me Believe (Evan's Lament)" (Boggia, Emitt Rhodes, P. Donnelly) – 4:08
10. "Final Word" (Boggia) – 3:21
11. "Slowly" (Boggia) – 6:08
12. "Supergirl" (Boggia) – 3:18

Rainy Day in Manayunk (Hidden track)
