= Fidelity Is the Enemy =

Studio album by Jim Boggia
- Released: 2001
- Genre: Pop
- Length: 42:08
- Label: scrApple

Fidelity Is the Enemy is a 2001 studio album by pop singer-songwriter Jim Boggia. A track from the album, "Several Thousand" was featured in the ABC television show Men in Trees. The song was also recorded by American Idol contestant Constantine Maroulis for his debut album.

== Track listing ==
All tracks composed by Jim Boggia; except where indicated

1. "So Full" – 3:47
2. "Toy Boat" – 4:21
3. "Don't Talk (Put Your Head on my Shoulder)" (Brian Wilson, Tony Asher) – 0:20
4. "Bubblegum 45's" (Jim Boggia, Jonathan Coulton) – 2:47
5. "Several Thousand" – 3:24
6. "Black and Blue" – 5:38
7. "Untitled Track" – 0:18
8. "Untitled Track" – 0:33
9. "O-P" – 3:41
10. "Nothing Wrong with Me" – 3:45
11. "Peter Pan" – 5:00
12. "Weather" – 3:31
13. "That, for Me, Is You" – 3:52
  - Contains two hidden tracks "Several Thousand (Insane Solo)" and "The Humbug Song".
