= St. Teresa (song) =

1996 single by Joan Osborne

Single by Joan Osborne

from the album Relish
- B-side: "Lumina"
- Released: May 27, 1996
- Genre: Rock
- Length: 5:20 (album version); 4:44 (single edit)
- Label: Blue Gorilla; Mercury
- Songwriters: Joan Osborne; Eric Bazilian; Rob Hyman; Rick Chertoff
- Producer: Rick Chertoff

Joan Osborne singles chronology
"One of Us" (1995)	"St. Teresa" (1996)	"Right Hand Man" (1996)

"St. Teresa" is a song by American singer-songwriter Joan Osborne. Released in May 1996 by Blue Gorilla and Mercury as the second single from her debut album, Relish (1995), it was written by Osborne as well as its producer Rick Chertoff and the Hooters members Eric Bazilian and Rob Hyman. It failed to chart in the US but had some minor international chart success.

== Background and release ==
Written about a sex worker she witnessed openly engaging in drug-dealing in her Manhattan neighbourhood, Osborne said that she penned the lyrics to "St. Teresa" while under hypnosis, in a desperate attempt to overcome writer's block. Alongside the simple fact that she found the words 'St. Teresa' to be rhythmically "singable," the singer further explained the song's connection to its namesake, Saint Teresa of Jesus, in an interview with The Irish Times:

"Part of the appeal of the Catholic church is the mystery, even in relation to sexuality. And someone like St Teresa experienced a lot of these mysteries through her body, so this idea has some kind of precedent in the history of religion. And I've no problem linking the themes of sexuality and spirituality in that way. Again, it's trying to reclaim a woman's sexuality, in particular, from the history of oppression in the Church."

"St. Teresa" received airplay on triple-A and modern rock radio stations, in late 1995, as a "warm-up" track to help the album gain exposure. It was also accompanied by a music video. Later given a proper commercial release, in 1996 (following the global success of "One of Us"), it was again promoted with another music video, this time directed by Osborne, herself. In it, she plays a hotel maid discovering bizarre and supernatural occurrences while cleaning, including goldfish living in a toilet and bathtub, as well as a levitating woman.

The re-release led to the song charting within the Top 50 in Australia, New Zealand, the UK and Sweden. It also earned a nomination for Best Female Rock Vocal Performance at the 38th Annual Grammy Awards, but ultimately lost to Alanis Morissette's hugely successful "You Oughta Know."

== Critical reception ==
Kevin Courtney from the Irish Times wrote: "In her follow up 'St Teresa' (Mercury), Joan paints a gritty picture of a drug-addicted prostitute for whom canonisation would seem a remote possibility. It's not half as catchy or quirky as "One of Us", although the "Losing My Religion" style mandolins keep it jangling nicely along."

== Track listings ==
UK CD1; Australian and Japanese CD single
No.	Title	Length
1.	"St. Teresa" (edit)	4:10
2.	"Spider Web" (live)	5:28
3.	"St. Teresa" (live)	4:18
4.	"Lumina"	3:08

UK CD2
No.	Title	Length
1.	"St. Teresa" (edit)	4:10
2.	"One of Us" (live)	5:13
3.	"Help Me"	5:17
4.	"St. Teresa" (album version)	5:20

UK cassette single and European CD single
No.	Title	Length
1.	"St. Teresa" (edit)	4:04
2.	"Lumina"	3:08

== Personnel ==
Personnel are adapted from the CD liner notes of Relish.

- Joan Osborne – lead vocals
- Rick Chertoff – production
- William Wittman – mixing, recording
- Eric Bazilian – chant, guitar, mandolin
- Mark Egan – bass guitar
- Rob Hyman – organ, synthesizer
- Andy Kravitz – drums

== Charts ==
Chart (1996)	Peak position
Australia (ARIA)	43
Canada Top Singles (RPM)	69
Canada Adult Contemporary (RPM)	42
Europe (Eurochart Hot 100)	96
New Zealand (Recorded Music NZ)	38
Scottish Singles Sales (Official Charts)	27
Sweden (Sverigetopplistan)	35
UK Singles (Official Charts)	33

== Release history ==
Region	Date	Format(s)	Label(s)	Ref.
United States	May 27, 1996	Alternative radio	Blue Gorilla; Mercury	
United States	May 28, 1996	Contemporary hit radio	Blue Gorilla; Mercury	
Japan	August 25, 1996	CD	Blue Gorilla; Mercury	
