= Love and Hate (Joan Osborne album) =

Studio album by Joan Osborne
- Released: April 8, 2014
- Length: 49:34
- Language: English
- Label: eOne
- Producer: Joan Osborne; Jack Petruzzelli

Joan Osborne chronology
Bring It on Home (2012)	Love and Hate (2014)	Songs of Bob Dylan (2017)

Love and Hate is a 2014 studio album by American singer-songwriter Joan Osborne, released on April 8, 2014. The concept album represents Osborne's first attempt at a song cycle, exploring the relationship between love and hate. The release took her years to finalize and has received positive reviews from critics.

== Reception ==
The editorial staff at AllMusic Guide gave this album 3.5 out of five stars, with reviewer Thom Jurek noting Osborne's experimentation as a songwriter, creating a song cycle in the album and noting the diversity of musical genres, but criticizing that "some of these songs falter". Kelly McCartney of PopMatters scored this release a seven out of 10, noting that these songs show Osborne's maturity as a singer and songwriter, summing up that Love and Hate is "particularly satisfying in that it delivers on—and extends—the promise made by her wonderful debut so many years ago".

== Track listing ==
1. "Where We Start" (Joan Osborne and Jack Petruzzelli) – 5:43
2. "Work On Me" (Osborne and Petruzzelli) – 2:45
3. "Mongrels" (Osborne and Petruzzelli) – 4:10
4. "Train" (Osborne and Petruzzelli) – 4:36
5. "Up All Night" (Eric Bazilian and Osborne) – 3:50
6. "Not Too Well Acquainted" (Osborne and Petruzzelli) – 5:46
7. "Thirsty for My Tears" (Keith Cotton and Osborne) – 3:37
8. "Love And Hate" (Cotton and Osborne) – 3:38
9. "Kitten’s Got Claws" (Osborne and Petruzzelli) – 5:20
10. "Secret Room" (Osborne and Petruzzelli) – 4:05
11. "Keep It Underground" (Gary Lucas, Osborne, and Petruzzelli) – 3:44
12. "Raga" (Cotton, Dorianne Luax, and Osborne) – 2:21

== Personnel ==
Note: liner notes to this album have extensive thank yous to several musicians, but they do not clarify who performed on the album or what role they performed other than the technical personnel below

- Joan Osborne – vocals, production, art direction
- Eric Bazilian – recording at Red Door Recordings, Philadelphia, Pennsylvania, United States
- Keith Cotton – recording at Window Sill Productions, New York City, New York, United States
- Jeff Fasano – photography
- Paul Grosso – creative direction and design
- Fred Kevorkian – mastering at Avatar Studios, New York City, New York, United States
- Pete Klepper – recording at Lake House Recording Studios, Albrightsville, Pennsylvania, United States
- Roman Klun – recording at His House Studios/Innsbruck Studios, New York City, New York, United States
- Rich Lamb – recording and mixing on "Where We Start", "Not Too Well Acquainted", and "Secret Room" at Lake House Recording Studios, Albrightsville, Pennsylvania, United States; string recording sessions at Systems Two, New York City, New York, United States
- Jack Petruzzelli – production
- Mark Plati – mixing on all tracks, except where noted at Alice's Restaurant, New York City, New York, United States
- Gia Rose – art direction
