= Chocolate Supa Highway =

Studio album by Spearhead
- Released: March 25, 1997
- Recorded: 1996
- Genre: Hip hop
- Length: 64:35
- Label: Capitol
- Producer: Michael Franti

Spearhead chronology
Home (1994)	Chocolate Supa Highway (1997)	Live at the Baobab (2000)

Professional ratings
Review scores
Source	Rating
AllMusic	4/5 stars
Robert Christgau	A−
Muzik	6/10
NME	5/10

Chocolate Supa Highway is the second studio album by Spearhead.

== Track listing ==
All tracks are written by Michael Franti except where indicated.

No.	Title	Writer(s)	Length
1.	"Africa On Line"		0:44
2.	"Chocolate Supa Highway"		5:08
3.	"Keep Me Lifted"	Franti, Carl Young, Ismail Azim	4:20
4.	"Food for tha Masses"	Franti, Young, Azim	5:01
5.	"U Can't Sing R Song"	Franti, Young	5:27
6.	"Tha Payroll (Stay Strong)"	Franti, Young, Mike Tyler	5:09
7.	"Madness in tha Hood (Free Ride)"	Franti, Young, Azim	4:49
8.	"Rebel Music (3 O'Clock Roadblock)"	Aston Barrett, Hugh Peart	5:26
9.	"Why Oh Why"		4:51
10.	"Comin' to Gitcha"		4:07
11.	"Life Sentence"		0:13
12.	"Ganja Babe"	Franti, Young	3:33
13.	"Wayfarin' Stranger" (featuring Joan Osborne)"		5:28
14.	"Gas Gauge (Tha World's in Your Hands)"	Franti, Young	4:35
15.	"Water Pistol Man (Chocolate Mix)"		5:44

== Singles ==
- "U Can't Sing R Song"
- "Why Oh Why"
- "Keep Me Lifted"

== Personnel ==
- Michael Franti: vocalist, producer
- Trinna Simmons: vocalist
- Carl Young: bass/sax
- David James: guitar
- Kim Buie: executive producer
- Prince Charles Alexander: mixed and mastered, with the exception of "Rebel Music"
- Joe Nicolo: mixed and mastered "Rebel Music"
- Stephen Marley: co-producer on "Rebel Music"

Other artists

- In addition to co-producing the song, Stephen Marley is a guest performer on "Rebel Music (3 O'Clock Roadblock)"
- Zap Mama is a guest performer on "Comin' to Gitcha"
- Joan Osborne is a guest performer on "Wayfaring Stranger"

== Charts ==
Chart performance for Chocolate Supa Highway
Chart (1997)	Peak position
Australian Albums (ARIA)	56
Dutch Albums (Album Top 100)	79
New Zealand Albums (RMNZ)	25
UK Albums (OCC)	68
