= Andy Kravitz =

American songwriter, musician, engineer, and producer

- Born: June 24, 1966 (age 60); Philadelphia, Pennsylvania, USA
- Occupations: Drummer, engineer, producer, songwriter
- Instruments: Drums, multi-instrumentalist
- Years active: 1986–present

Andy Kravitz is an American drummer and percussionist, audio engineer, record producer, and songwriter. He has been nominated for 14 Grammy Awards, winning several. He lives near Venice Beach in Los Angeles, California.

== Early life ==
Andy Kravitz was born in Philadelphia, Pennsylvania.

== Career ==
In 1992, Kravitz played with Kris Kross on Totally Krossed Out, and with former Fleetwood Mac guitarist and singer Rick Vito on his debut solo album, King of Hearts, on the songs "Desireé" and "Honey Love". In 1993, he produced Urge Overkill's fourth album, Saturation. In 1995, Kravitz played with Joan Osborne on her debut album, Relish, and co-produced Dishwalla's debut album, Pet Your Friends. In 1996, he played with Cypress Hill on their EP, Unreleased and Revamped. In 1998, Kravitz played with Imogen Heap on her debut album, iMegaphone. In 1999, he co-produced Simon Townshend's album, Animal Soup.

In 2000, Kravitz co-produced Juliana Hatfield's fourth album, Beautiful Creature. In 2010, he played with a local free jazz group formed by Warren Cuccurullo called Theoretical 5 in Mar Vista, Los Angeles with Frank Zappa alumni Arthur Barrow (bass), Tommy Mars (keyboards, vocals), and Larry Klimas (saxophone). In 2011, Kravitz collaborated with Michael Tearson and Tom Hampton on Tearson's debut album, Stuff That Works.

=== New White Trash ===
New White Trash was a downtempo acoustic rock band formed by Kravitz and Michael Ruppert, singer Kristen Vigard, and guitarist Doug Lewis. The band released two albums, Doublewide (2011) and Age of Authority (2013). Following Ruppert's suicide in 2014, the band announced its intention to release a tribute album. Beyond the Rubicon was released on December 11, 2014.

== Charts and awards ==
- The Wailing Souls (1992), All Over the World, Andy Kravitz (percussion), reached #7 on Billboard's Top World Music Albums and #40 on Top Heatseekers.
- Billy Joel (1993), River of Dreams, Andy Kravitz (percussion), peaked at #1 on the Billboard 200 and was nominated for Album of the Year.
- Urge Overkill (1993), Saturation, Andy Kravitz (editing, producer), reached #2 on Top Heatseekers and #146 on the Billboard 200.
- Shawn Colvin (1994), Cover Girl, Andy Kravitz (drums), reached #48 on the Billboard 200 and was nominated for Best Contemporary Folk Album.
- Joan Osborne (1995), Relish, Andy Kravitz (drums, percussion), reached #1 on Top Heatseekers and #9 on the Billboard 200 and was nominated for Album of the Year.

== Selected discography ==
Drums and percussion

- Steady B (1987). What's My Name. Jive.
- bounce the ocean (1991). self-titled. Private Music.
- Kris Kross (1992). Totally Krossed Out. Ruffhouse/Columbia.
- The Goats (1992). Tricks of the Shade. Ruffhouse/Columbia.
- The Wailing Souls (1992). All Over the World. Chaos Recordings.
- Billy Joel (1993). River of Dreams. Columbia.
- Spearhead (1994). Home. Capitol.
- Shawn Colvin (1994). Cover Girl. Columbia.
- Schoolly D (1994). Welcome to America. Ruffhouse/Columbia.
- The Rolling Stones (1994). Love Is Strong. Virgin. ("Love Is Strong (Joe the Butcher Club Remix)")
- Joan Osborne (1995). Relish. Blue Gorilla Records/Mercury.
- Cypress Hill (1996). Unreleased and Revamped (EP). Ruffhouse/Columbia.
- Imogen Heap (1998). iMegaphone. Almo Sounds.
- New White Trash (2011). Doublewide. Venice Arts Club.
- New White Trash (2013). Age of Authority. Venice Arts Club.
- New White Trash (2014). Beyond the Rubicon. Venice Arts Club.

Producer

- Urge Overkill (1993). Saturation. Geffen.
- Dishwalla (1995). Pet Your Friends. A&M Records.
- Simon Townshend (1999). Animal Soup. Stir Music.
- Juliana Hatfield (2000). Beautiful Creature. Zoë Records/Island Records.
- Lana Del Rey (2008). "Come When You Call Me America" Unreleased.
- Andre 3000 (2023). New Blue Sun

Writer

- Lana Del Rey (2008). "Come When You Call Me America" Unreleased.

Videos

- New White Trash (2011). Realize the Lie. Venice Arts Club.
- New White Trash (2012). Hello Life. Venice Arts Club.
