= Early Recordings (Joan Osborne album) =

Live album by Joan Osborne
- Released: November 5, 1996
- Recorded: N/A
- Genre: Rock
- Length: 48:59
- Label: Mercury Records/Universal Records
- Producer: Joan Osborne, Tom Fritze

Joan Osborne chronology
Relish (1995)	Early Recordings (1996)	Righteous Love (2000)

Professional ratings
Review scores
Source	Rating
AllMusic	2/5 stars
Entertainment Weekly	B
Los Angeles Times	1/4 stars

Early Recordings is an album by Joan Osborne released on November 5, 1996. Except for "His Eyes Are a Blue Million Miles," it consists of live recordings, mostly from Osborne's debut album, Soul Show: Live at Delta 88.

== Track listing ==
All tracks are written by Joan Osborne, unless otherwise noted.

No.	Title	Writer(s)	Length
1.	"Fly Away"		3:52
2.	"Dreamin' About the Day"		3:58
3.	"His Eyes Are a Blue Million Miles"	Don Van Vliet	3:56
4.	"Fingerprints"		4:38
5.	"4 Camels"		3:49
6.	"What You Gonna Do"		4:57
7.	"Match Burn Twice"		3:53
8.	"Billie Listens (To Your Heartbeat)"		4:39
9.	"Wild World"		4:52
10.	"Son of a Preacher Man"	John Hurley; Ronnie Wilkins	6:01
11.	"Get Up Jack"		4:21
Total length:			48:56

== Personnel ==
- Ray Alfasi – photography
- Chris Butler – guitar, producer
- Yoomi Chong – design
- Greg Di Gesu – assistant engineer
- Dave Dreiwitz – guitar
- Gary Frazier – bass
- Tom Fritze – producer, engineer, mixing
- Margery Greenspan – art direction
- Amanda Homi – backing vocals
- Wayne Isaak – photography
- Mike Leslie – bass, dobro, backing vocals
- George Marino – compilation
- James Mussen – drums
- Joan Osborne – tambourine, vocals, producer, engineer
- Shawn Pelton – drums
- Jack Petruzzelli – organ, acoustic guitar, guitar, backing vocals
- Gary Schreiner – keyboards
- Mark Shane – second engineer
- Sissy Siero – backing vocals
- Kevin Trainor – guitar
- Nick Vaccaro – photography
- Producer – Chris Butler (tracks: 3, 8), Joan Osborne, Tom Fritze (tracks: 1, 2, 4, 5, 7, 9 to 11)
