= Little Wild One =

Studio album by Joan Osborne
- Released: September 9, 2008
- Recorded: Elm Street Studios
- Genres: Rock, R&B
- Length: 42:32
- Label: Saguaro Road M19666, Capital
- Producers: Rick Chertoff, Rob Hyman, Eric Bazilian

Joan Osborne chronology
Breakfast in Bed (2007)	Little Wild One (2008)	Bring It on Home (2012)

Singles from Little Wild One
- 1. "Sweeter Than The Rest" Released: September 2008

Professional ratings
Aggregate scores
Source	Rating
Metacritic	(65/100)
Review scores
Source	Rating
Allmusic	3.5/5 stars
The Austin Chronicle	3/5 stars
Entertainment Weekly	B
The Music Box	3/5 stars
Paste	(4.4/10)
People	4/4 stars
PopMatters	7/10 stars
Q	3/5 stars
Slant Magazine	3.5/5 stars
Uncut	2/5 stars

Little Wild One is the sixth studio album by Joan Osborne released under Saguaro Road Records on September 9, 2008. On this album she was assisted again by producers/writers Rob Hyman, Eric Bazilian, and Rick Chertoff who also worked with her on her breakthrough album Relish. The album was recorded at Elm Street Studios and Red Door Recording.

The first single was "Sweeter Than the Rest".

Osborne toured to support her newest album, beginning on September 25 at the Music Hall in Williamsburg, Brooklyn.

== Track listing ==
No.	Title	Writer(s)	Length
1.	"Hallelujah in the City"	Eric Bazilian, Rick Chertoff, Rob Hyman, Joan Osborne	4:16
2.	"Sweeter than the Rest"	Eric Bazilian, Rick Chertoff, Rob Hyman, Joan Osborne	4:08
3.	"Cathedrals"	J. Clifford	4:16
4.	"Little Wild One"	Eric Bazilian, Rob Hyman, Joan Osborne	3:31
5.	"Rodeo"	Eric Bazilian, Rick Chertoff, D. Forman, Rob Hyman, Joan Osborne	3:39
6.	"To the One I Love"	Eric Bazilian, Rick Chertoff, Rob Hyman, Joan Osborne	4:25
7.	"Daddy-O"	Eric Bazilian, Rick Chertoff, D. Forman, Rob Hyman	3:28
8.	"Meet You in the Middle"	Joan Osborne	3:45
9.	"Can't Say No"	Eric Bazilian, Rick Chertoff, Rob Hyman, Joan Osborne	4:48
10.	"Light of This World"	Reverend Gary Davis, Joan Osborne	3:59
11.	"Bury Me on the Battery"	Rob Hyman, Joan Osborne	3:03
12.	"If the End Has Come" (Exclusive Borders Bonus Track)	Joan Osborne	4:43

== Credits ==
- Mastered by George Marino
- Producers – Eric Bazilian, Rick Chertoff, Rob Hyman
