= Jim Boggia =

American singer-songwriter

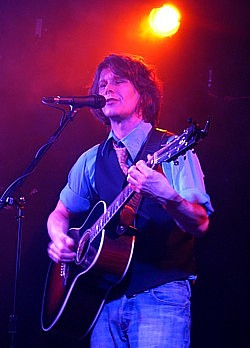
- Jim Boggia at The Saint in Asbury Park, NJ

Background information
- Born: Royal Oak, Michigan
- Origin: Philadelphia, Pennsylvania
- Genres: Pop
- Years active: 2001–present
- Label: Bluhammock Music

Jim Boggia is a pop singer-songwriter based in Philadelphia.

== Early life ==
Jim Boggia was born in Royal Oak, Michigan. At birth, he was declared legally blind in his left eye. He began playing the guitar at age five, encouraged by his musician father. In 1982 he graduated from Fenton High School in Fenton, Michigan. Boggia eventually moved to Philadelphia to work as a customer service representative in a high-tech studio equipment company.

== Career ==
Boggia later quit his job and began his musical career by doing session work, jingles, and writing songs for other musical artists. He played or toured with various artists including Juliana Hatfield, Jill Sobule, Amanda Marshall, and Bernadette Peters. In 1998 he formed a band with Mike Frank, Kevin Hanson, Erik Johnson, and Steve Beskrone. The same year he and Andy Kravitz wrote a single for Christian singer Jaci Velasquez called "Glory". The album went gold and the song reached # 1 on the Billboard Christian charts. He was also a member of the band 4 Way Street along with Ben Arnold, Scott Bricklin and Joseph Parsons. In 2001, Boggia released his first full-length solo studio album Fidelity is the Enemy. The track "Several Thousand" was featured on the ABC show Men in Trees.

In 2005, Boggia released a follow-up album, Safe in Sound. The song "Live the Proof" appeared in a BlackBerry commercial. He released a third album on August 5, 2008, entitled Misadventures in Stereo. The album features collaborations with lyricist Tony Asher, NRBQ guitarist Big Al Anderson, and singer songwriter David Poe. He also released a mono mix of the album on August 19, 2008, that was issued in the vinyl format.

== Influences ==
Jim Boggia has a variety of musical influences including NRBQ, Simon & Garfunkel, Harry Nilsson, Cat Stevens, and Brian Wilson. He also is a fan of the Beatles, having performed in various Beatles tribute concerts as well as a recreation of their rooftop concert.

== Awards and recognition ==
Boggia was voted the No. 6 Best Local Music Act in Citysearch 2001 for Philadelphia.

Boggia's "Misadventures in Stereo" was nominated in the 8th Annual Independent Music Awards for Pop/Rock Album of the year.

== Discography ==
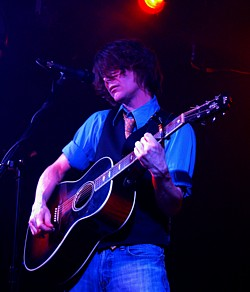
Jim Boggia

- Tragical Blistery Lure (2001)
- Transistorized 220 (2001)
- Fidelity Is the Enemy (2001)
- JPGR (2002)
- 4 Sketches (2002)
- Transitorized 220 Volume 2 (2003)
- Red Cross Hurricane Katrina Relief Fund (2004)
- Safe in Sound (2005)
- Misadventures in Stereo (2008)
- The Abbey Road Session (2008)
- UkePop (2015)

=== Collaborations featured on other albums ===
- "Bad Time", "Everywhere You Go", No Compromise", "Firefly", "Lead Me On" and "So Low" with Ben Arnold on In Case I'm Gone Tomorrow
- Taxi Jams
- Y Not Sampler
- It's About Music
