= Just the Two of Us =

Just the Two of Us may refer to:

== Music ==
=== Albums ===
- Just the Two of Us (Matt Dusk and Margaret album), 2015 (or the title song)
- Just the Two of Us (Porter Wagoner and Dolly Parton album), 1968
- Just the Two of Us (Secret Garden album), 2014
- Just the Two of Us, a 1982 album by John Holt
- Just the Two of Us... Me and Them, a 2004 album by Mindflow

=== Songs ===
- "Just the Two of Us" (Grover Washington, Jr. song), 1981, with vocals by Bill Withers
- "Just the Two of Us" (Will Smith song), 1998 (which heavily samples the above song)
- "Just the Two of Us", a 1997 song by Eminem later retitled "'97 Bonnie & Clyde" (1998)
- "Just the Two of Us", a 2013 single by Davichi from an album, Mystic Ballad Pt. 2
- "Just the Two of Us", a remix from Austin Powers: The Spy Who Shagged Me

== Television and film ==
- Just the Two of Us (TV series), a British reality singing contest
- The Dark Side of Tomorrow, a 1970 American film later re-released as Just the Two of Us
- Just the Two of Us (Ty da ia da my s tobo), a 2001 film directed by Alexander Veledinsky
- Just the Two of Us (2023 film), a French film directed by Valérie Donzelli
- Solos los dos, a 1968 Spanish film starring Marisol
