= Soul Show: Live at Delta 88 =

Live album by Joan Osborne
- Released: 1991
- Length: 52:17
- Label: Womanly Hips

Joan Osborne chronology
Soul Show: Live at Delta 88 (1991)	Relish (1995)

Soul Show: Live at Delta 88 is Joan Osborne's debut album, released in 1991. It is a live album and was recorded in May 1991 during a performance at New York City's Delta 88 nightclub.

Osborne recorded new versions of "Crazy Baby" and "Help Me" for her 1995 album Relish. Most of Soul Show's remaining tracks were reissued on 1996's Early Recordings; however, they were remixed and presented in a different running order from the original release.

== Track listing ==
All songs written by Joan Osborne unless otherwise indicated.

1. "Son of a Preacher Man" (John Hurley, Ronnie Wilkins)
2. "Flyaway"
3. "Get Up Jack"
4. "Crazy Baby"
5. "Fingerprints"
6. "Dreamin' About the Day"
7. "Help Me" (Sonny Boy Williamson)
8. "Match Burn Twice"
9. "Wild World"
10. "4 Camels"
11. "Lady Madonna" (John Lennon, Paul McCartney)
