= Pretty Little Stranger =

Studio album by Joan Osborne
- Released: November 13, 2006
- Recorded: OmniSound (Nashville); The Doghouse (Nashville); Electric Comoland (Lafayette)
- Genre: Country, pop
- Length: 51:09
- Label: Vanguard, Capitol
- Producer: Steve Buckingham

Joan Osborne chronology
Christmas Means Love (2005)	Pretty Little Stranger (2006)	Breakfast in Bed (2007)

Professional ratings
Review scores
Source	Rating
About.com	5/5 stars
Allmusic	3.5/5 stars
Entertainment Weekly	A−
People	2.5/4 stars
PopMatters	6/10 stars
Slant Magazine	3.5/5 stars

Pretty Little Stranger is the fourth studio album by Joan Osborne. The album is her first release on the independent Vanguard Records label, and has been her only album incorporating significant country influences. The record was released in the UK on November 13, 2006, and in the US on November 14.

== Track listing ==
1. "Pretty Little Stranger" (Osborne)
2. "Brokedown Palace" (Jerry Garcia, Robert Hunter)
3. "Who Divided" (Osborne)
4. "Holy Waters" (Andreas Uetz, Osborne)
5. "What You Are" (Patty Griffin, Craig Ross)
6. "Shake That Devil" (Osborne)
7. "Please Don't Tell Me How the Story Ends" (Kris Kristofferson)
8. "Time Won't Tell" (Beth Nielsen Chapman, Harlan Howard)
9. "Dead Roses" (Osborne, Gary Nicholson)
10. "After Jane" (Osborne)
11. "'Til I Get It Right" (Red Lane, Larry Henley)
12. "When the Blue Hour Comes" (Rodney Crowell, Roy Orbison, Will Jennings)
13. "Losing You All Over Again" (Bonus Track)

== Personnel ==
Credits adapted from CD liner notes.

Musicians

- Joan Osborne – lead vocals (all tracks), backing vocals (5), harmony vocals (9)
- Eddie Bayers – drums (all tracks)
- Steve Buckingham – electric guitar (1, 4–6, 10), tambourine (1, 3), acoustic guitar (5)
- Rodney Crowell – harmony vocals (12)
- Dan Dugmore – lap steel guitar (5), steel guitar (8)
- Paul Franklin – steel guitar (4, 7, 10, 11)
- Steve Gibson – electric guitar (1–9, 11, 12), acoustic guitar (6, 10)
- Vince Gill – harmony vocals (8)
- Tania Hancheroff – harmony vocals (4)
- Wes Hightower – harmony vocals (3)
- John Hobbs – B3 (1–3, 5, 12), Wurlitzer (1, 3)
- Alison Krauss – harmony vocals (4)
- Sonny Landreth – slide guitar (9)
- Tim Lauer – accordion (8), pump organ (10)
- Charlie McCoy – vibes (11)
- Gordon Mote – piano (7)
- Carmella Ramsey – harmony vocals (1)
- Michael Rhodes – bass guitar (all tracks)
- Bryan Sutton – acoustic guitar (1–4, 7–9, 11, 12), banjo (6), bouzouki (10)
- Dan Tyminski – harmony vocals (7)
- Reese Wynans – B3 (9), Wurlitzer (9)

Technical

- Steve Buckingham – production
- Lesli Halingstad – production assistance
- Neal Cappellino – mixing, recording
- Don Cobb – mastering
- Eric Conn – mastering
- Tony Daigle – engineering
- Bob Ingison – engineering assistance
- Sonny Landreth – recording
- Greg Lawrence – engineering assistance
- Chip Matthews – digital editing
- Marshall Morgan – additional engineering
- Steve Short – engineering assistance

== Chart performance ==
Chart (2006)	Peak position
U.S. Billboard Top Country Albums	58
U.S. Billboard Independent Albums	34
