= Righteous Love =

Studio album by Joan Osborne
- Released: September 12, 2000
- Genre: Rock
- Label: Interscope 069490737-2
- Producer: Joan Osborne, Mitchell Froom, Rick "Soldier" Will, Aaron Comess

Joan Osborne chronology
Early Recordings (1996)	Righteous Love (2000)	How Sweet It Is (2002)

Professional ratings
Aggregate scores
Source	Rating
Metacritic	59/100
Review scores
Source	Rating
AllMusic	3/5 stars
Chicago Tribune	(average)
Robert Christgau	(dud)
Entertainment Weekly	B
Los Angeles Times	2.5/4 stars
Mojo	1.5/5 stars
Q	2/5 stars
Rolling Stone	3.5/5 stars
Spin	4/10
Wall of Sound	70/100

Righteous Love is Joan Osborne's second studio album and fourth overall. It was released on September 12, 2000, by Interscope Records.

== Track listing ==
1. "Running Out of Time" (Osborne, Louie Pérez) – 4:45
2. "Righteous Love" (Osborne, Joseph Arthur) – 4:15
3. "Safety in Numbers" (Osborne, Erik Della Penna) – 4:27
4. "Love Is Alive" (Gary Wright) – 3:29
5. "Angel Face" (Osborne, Arthur, Pérez, Andreas Uetz) – 3:35
6. "Grand Illusion" (Osborne, Erik Della Penna, Rainy Orteca, Jack Petruzzelli) – 4:02
7. "If I Was Your Man" (Osborne, Arthur, Pérez, Rick Chertoff, Rob Hyman) – 4:57
8. "Baby Love" (Osborne, Orteca, Erik Della Penna, Petruzzelli) – 4:16
9. "Hurricane" (Osborne, Michael Mangini, Erik Della Penna, Petruzzelli) – 4:17
10. "Poison Apples (Hallelujah)" (Osborne, Hyman, Chertoff) – 4:19
11. "Make You Feel My Love" (Bob Dylan) – 4:01

Track 9 was spelled as "Hurricaine" on album track listing. Correct title is "Hurricane".

== Personnel ==
Adapted from allmusic.

- Joan Osborne – vocals, Vox organ
- Joseph Arthur, Erik Della Penna – guitars
- David Immerglück – baritone guitar, pedal steel, banjo
- Val McCallum – guitars, backing vocals
- Aaron Comess – bass guitar, drums, percussion
- Mitchell Froom – keyboards
- Davey Faragher – bass, backing vocals
- Carla Azar – drums
- Pete Thomas – drums, percussion
- Steve Berlin, Erik Lawrence – saxophone
- Charlie Bisharat, Joel Derouin, Suzie Katayama – strings
- Larry Corbett, Matt Funes, Michele Richards – strings, backing vocals
