= Breakfast in Bed (album) =

Studio album by Joan Osborne
- Released: May 22, 2007
- Genre: R&B, pop
- Label: Time Life M19433
- Producer: Tor Hyams

Joan Osborne chronology
Pretty Little Stranger (2006)	Breakfast in Bed (2007)	Little Wild One (2008)

Breakfast in Bed is a studio album by Joan Osborne. It was produced by Tor Hyams and released on May 22, 2007 by Time Life. The album mostly contains soul cover songs from the 1970s and 1980s, including "I've Got to Use My Imagination" and "Midnight Train to Georgia," both made popular by Gladys Knight & the Pips. The album also contains six original songs.

Two cover songs that Osborne sang live from the documentary movie, Standing in the Shadows of Motown are featured at the end of this album: Martha and the Vandellas' "Heat Wave" and Jimmy Ruffin's "What Becomes of the Brokenhearted?"

== Critical reception ==
Professional ratings
Review scores
Source	Rating
AllMusic	4/5 stars
IGN	7.4/10
The Music Box	3/5 stars
PopMatters	4/10
Slant Magazine	2.5/5 stars
Stylus Magazine	C

PopMatters wrote that "the biggest problem is that Breakfast in Bed is all shine and polish, but no sex or sensuality."

Slant Magazine wrote that "both as a writer and a vocalist, Osborne has the chops to record a killer soul album, but this tasteful-to-fault effort isn't it."

== Track listing ==
1. "I've Got to Use My Imagination" (Gerry Goffin, Barry Goldberg)
2. "Ain't No Sunshine" (Bill Withers)
3. "Midnight Train to Georgia" (Jim Weatherly)
4. "Baby Is a Butterfly" (Osborne)
5. "Breakfast in Bed" (Eddie Hinton, Donnie Fritts)
6. "Cream Dream" (Osborne)
7. "Natural High" (Charles McCormick)
8. "Heart of Stone" (Osborne)
9. "Sara Smile" (Daryl Hall, John Oates)
10. "Eliminate the Night" (Osborne)
11. "Break Up to Make Up" (Thom Bell, Linda Creed, Kenneth Gamble)
12. "I Know What's Goin' On" (Osborne)
13. "Alone with You" (Osborne)
14. "Kiss and Say Goodbye" (Winfred Lovett)
15. "Heat Wave" (Holland–Dozier–Holland)
16. "What Becomes of the Brokenhearted" (William Weatherspoon, James Dean, Paul Riser)
17. "Everybody Needs a Friend" (Curtis Mayfield) (bonus track)

== Chart performance ==
Chart (2007)	Peak position
U.S. Billboard 200	160
