= Nobody Owns You =

Studio album by Joan Osborne
- Released: September 8, 2023
- Studio: Degraw Sound, Brooklyn, New York, US
- Genre: Americana; roots rock
- Length: 47:07
- Language: English
- Label: Womanly Hips
- Producer: Ben Rice

Joan Osborne chronology
Radio Waves (2023)	Nobody Owns You (2023)

"You can't control what happens to this person that you've raised out in the world; they're on their own—and you also can't control what happens with this music that you put out into the world. You don't know how people are going to accept it, and you don't know who's going to be interested."

—Joan Osborne on the title Nobody Owns You and themes on the album.

Nobody Owns You is a 2023 studio album by American singer-songwriter Joan Osborne. The release balances personal and political themes and has received positive reviews from critics.

== Reception ==
In American Songwriter, Lee Zimmerman rated this album 3 out of 5 stars, writing that "Osborne is in typical robust voice throughout, Rice's production is appropriately subtle if needed and more vivid when required, but some selections don't connect melodically" and "there is little of the frisky soul or funk that made Osborne's albums of R&B, Motown, and oldie pop covers so successful, replaced by a somber, pensiveness". Jim Hynes of Glide Magazine praised the "raw emotional place" and how Osborne has "never been as focused and direct as she is with this poignant effort". Writing for New Noise Magazine, John Moore also rated the album 3 out of 5 stars, describing Nobody Owns You as a more introspective and restrained release than Osborne’s recent work, noting that while the music can feel muted and occasionally drags, the album's lyrical strength and emotional honesty remain its greatest assets, particularly on tracks such as "Should've Danced More" and the politically charged closer "Great American Cities".

== Track listing ==
1. "I Should've Danced More" (Joan Osborne and Ben Rice) – 3:56
2. "Nobody Owns You" (Osborne and Rice) – 3:32
3. "So Many Airports" (Osborne and Rice) – 3:44
4. "Woman's Work" (Adam Bernstein, Osborne, Larry Perfetti Jack Petruzzelli, and Rice) – 3:39
5. "The Smallest Trees" (Osborne) – 3:40
6. "Time of the Gun" (Osborne and Petruzzelli) – 4:03
7. "Dig a Little Ditch" (Osborne) – 3:40
8. "Secret Wine" (Rice and Wade Schuman) – 3:37
9. "Child of God" (no songwriting credits) – 4:26
10. "Tower of Joy" (Osborne) – 4:00
11. "Lifeline" (Osborne and Rice) – 4:16
12. "Great American Cities" (Osborne and Rice) – 4:39

== Personnel ==
- Joan Osborne – whistle, vocals, field recordings
- Keith Brogdon – package design
- Cindy Cashdollar – lap steel guitar, steel guitar, baritone guitar
- Laura Crosta – photography
- Joe LaPorta – audio mastering at Sterling Sound Edgewater, New Jersey, United States
- Josh Lattanzi – bass guitar, electric upright bass
- Jack Petruzzelli – baritone guitar, electric guitar, percussion, piano, organ
- Ben Rice – banjo, acoustic guitar, electric guitar, Mellotron, percussion, backing vocals, field recordings, audio engineering, mixing, production
- Catherine Russell – backing vocals
- Dave Sherman – piano, Hammond B3
- Jill Sobule – backing vocals on "Great American Cities"
- Greg Wieczorek – drums, percussion, glockenspiel
- Rachael Yamagata – backing vocals

== See also ==
- 2023 in American music
- List of 2023 albums
