= Bring It On Home (album) =

2012 studio album by Joan Osborne

Studio album by Joan Osborne
- Released: March 27, 2012
- Recorded: Waterfront Studios, New York
- Genre: Blues, R&B
- Length: 44:09
- Label: Saguaro Road
- Producer: Jack Petruzzelli, Joan Osborne

Joan Osborne chronology
Little Wild One (2008)	Bring It On Home (2012)	Love and Hate (2014)

Singles from Bring It On Home
- 1. "Shake Your Hips" Released: January 2012

Professional ratings
Review scores
Source	Rating
AllMusic	4.5/5 stars
Daily Express	4/5 stars
The New Zealand Herald	3.5/5 stars
No Depression	(favorable)
Paste	(4.9/10)

Bring It On Home is a covers album by Joan Osborne, released under Saguaro Road Records on March 27, 2012. It was her first album in five years. The record is co-produced with guitarist Jack Petruzzelli and consists entirely of blues and R&B covers. The album also includes tracks originally made famous by American blues masters, such as Sonny Boy Williamson ("Bring It On Home"), Muddy Waters ("I Want to Be Loved"), as well as recordings originally released by some of the best-known R&B performers, including Ray Charles ("I Don't Need No Doctor"), Al Green ("Rhymes"), and Otis Redding ("Champagne and Wine").

The first single was "Shake Your Hips", released in January 2012 on iTunes. Osborne toured to support her album in March 2012 and did so again in early 2013. Bring It On Home was nominated for a 2013 Grammy Award in the Blues category.

== Track listing ==
No.	Title	Writer(s)	Length
1.	"I Don't Need No Doctor"	Nick Ashford, Valerie Simpson, Jo Armstead	3:20
2.	"Bring It On Home"	Willie Dixon	4:07
3.	"Roll Like a Big Wheel"	Olive Brown	2:50
4.	"Game of Love"	Ike Turner	3:16
5.	"Broken Wings"	John Mayall	4:38
6.	"Shoorah! Shoorah!"	Allen Toussaint	2:52
7.	"I Want to Be Loved"	Willie Dixon	3:35
8.	"The Same Love That Made Me Laugh"	Bill Withers	4:25
9.	"Shake Your Hips"	Slim Harpo	2:28
10.	"I'm Qualified"	Jimmy Hughes	3:15
11.	"Champagne and Wine"	Otis Redding	3:41
12.	"Rhymes"	Al Green	4:43

== Reception ==
The album was generally well received. Thom Jurek was positive, writing at AllMusic, "This isn't a reverential recording; it's authoritative; she makes these songs her own. Bring It On Home carries Osborne's mature voice in a way that's never been heard from her before. Her abilities as an interpretive singer prove her an extension of these [blues and R&B] traditions, not merely a torch bearer for them."
