= Trigger Hippy =

American rock band

- Origin: Nashville, Tennessee, United States
- Genres: Blues rock, hard rock, Americana
- Years active: 2009–present
- Members: Steve Gorman; Nick Govrik; Ed Jurdi; Amber Woodhouse
- Past members: Jimmy Herring; Audley Freed; Tom Bukovac; Jackie Greene; Joan Osborne
- Website: triggerhippy.com

Trigger Hippy is an American rock band composed of former Black Crowes drummer Steve Gorman, bassist Nick Govrik, guitarist/singer Ed Jurdi, and singer Amber Woodhouse.

== History ==
The group was initially formed as a casual collaboration between Govrik, Gorman and other Nashville musicians. Trigger Hippy made its live debut on February 2, 2009, at the Cox Capitol Theatre in Macon, Georgia.

The band played shows in 2011 and 2012, with a rotating cast of band members. A consistent lineup featuring Govrik and Gorman along with Joan Osborne, Jackie Greene, and Tom Bukovac came together and announced plans to record an album in the fall of 2012.

Trigger Hippy released their first EP on Record Store Day's Back to Black Friday on November 29, 2013.

Trigger Hippy released an album on September 30, 2014. In the summer of 2015, the band announced a lengthy break. A new four piece lineup featuring Jurdi and Woodhouse was announced on June 19, 2019. A new album, Full Circle and Then Some was released in October 2019.

== Members ==
- Steve Gorman – drums (2009–present)
- Nick Govrik – bass, vocals (2009–present)
- Ed Jurdi – guitar, vocals (2019–present)
- Amber Woodhouse – vocals (2019–present)

=== Former members ===
- Audley Freed – guitar (2009–2012)
- Jimmy Herring – guitar (2009–2010)
- Jackie Greene – guitar, keyboards, vocals (2010–2015)
- Tom Bukovac – guitar (2012–2015)
- Joan Osborne – vocals (2010–2017)

== Discography ==
=== Albums ===
- Trigger Hippy (Released September 30, 2014), Rounder Records
- Full Circle and Then Some (Released October 11, 2019), Turkey Grass)
