= Christmas Means Love =

- Cover to the 2005 release from Osborne's Womanly Hips record label; a 2007 re-release from Time Life has a different cover

Studio album by Joan Osborne
- Released: October 18, 2005
- Genre: Christmas music
- Length: 39:25
- Language: English
- Label: Womanly Hips
- Producer: Tor Hyams

Joan Osborne chronology
How Sweet It Is (2002)	Christmas Means Love (2005)	Pretty Little Stranger (2006)

Christmas Means Love is a 2005 Christmas album by American singer-songwriter Joan Osborne.

== Reception ==
The editorial staff of AllMusic Guide scored this album three out of five stars, with reviewer Thom Jurek noting that the release is not essential, but Christmas albums largely are not and "Osborne's voice being what it is, she could sing the back of a cereal box and make it interesting".

== Track listing ==
1. "Christmas Means Love" (Morris Dollison, Jr.) – 3:06
2. "Santa Claus Baby" (John Dolphin and William York) – 2:34
3. "Away in a Manger" (traditional) – 4:35
4. "Christmas Must Be Tonight" (Robbie Robertson) – 3:59
5. "Cherry Tree Carol" (traditional) – 3:39
6. "Christmas in New Orleans" (Dick Sherman and Joseph Van Winkle) – 3:35
7. "Children Go Where I Send Thee" (traditional) – 4:23
8. "Angels We Have Heard On High" (traditional) – 3:20
9. "What Do Bad Girls Get?" (Joan Osborne) – 2:32
10. "Great Day in December" (Claude Jeter) – 4:45
11. "Silent Night" (traditional) – 3:08

== Personnel ==
- Joan Osborne – vocals, arrangement
- Ennis Glendon – musical assistance
- Tor Hyams – production
- John Leventhal – guitar, piano on "Silent Night"
- Vincenzo LoRusso – recording, mixing
- Mike Mierau – mastering
- Chris Muse – engineering
- Geoff Pearlman – slide guitar on "Cherry Tree Carol"
- Red Herring Design – design
- Catherine Russell – backing vocals
- Gary Schreiner – piano, organ, harmonica, tubular bells, strings, arrangement
- Billy Ward – drums
- Tracy Wormworth – bass guitar

== See also ==
- List of 2005 albums
