= Home (Spearhead album) =

Studio album by Spearhead
- Released: September 20, 1994
- Recorded: 1993–1994
- Genre: Hip hop, soul
- Label: Capitol
- Producer: Joe "The Butcher" Nicolo; Michael Franti

Spearhead chronology
Home (1994)	Chocolate Supa Highway (1997)

Home is the debut album by American hip hop band Spearhead, released in 1994 on Capitol Records. It was produced by Joe "The Butcher" Nicolo and Spearhead frontman Michael Franti at Studio 4 in Philadelphia.

"Hole in the Bucket" was released as a single. It became an MTV Buzz Bin song and won a Clio Award.

== Reception ==
Professional ratings
Review scores
Source	Rating
AllMusic	4.5/5 stars
Chicago Tribune	4/4 stars
The Guardian	3/4 stars
Los Angeles Times	3/4 stars
NME	8/10
Q	4/5 stars
Select	4/5

Paul Corio of Rolling Stone wrote: "Spearhead lean slightly toward jazz, but their warm rhythm and Franti's supple voice keep things fresh. Lacking even an eighth of PE's heyday power, this crew still boasts a telling advantage: It knows what time it is."

== Track listing ==
All tracks are written by Michael Franti except where indicated.

No.	Title	Writer(s)	Length
1.	"People in tha Middle"		5:04
2.	"Love Is da Shit"	Franti, Charlie Hunter	5:37
3.	"Piece o' Peace"		4:54
4.	"Positive"	Franti, Hunter	4:29
5.	"Of Course You Can"	Franti, Andy Kravitz, Scott Storch, Mike Tyler	4:38
6.	"Hole in the Bucket"	Franti, Mary Harris	5:22
7.	"Home"		1:42
8.	"Dream Team"		4:41
9.	"Runfayalife"		4:42
10.	"Crime to Be Broke in America"	Franti, Tyler, Harris	4:51
11.	"100,000 Miles"		5:21
12.	"Red Beans & Rice"	Franti, Harris	4:27
13.	"Caught Without an Umbrella"	Franti, Ruth Forman	5:22

== Personnel ==
- Michael Franti – vocals
- Mary Harris – vocals
- Le Le Jamison – keyboards
- Keith McArthur – bass
- David James – guitar
- James Gray – drums
- Vernon Reid – guitar (solo)
- Charlie Hunter – guitar

== Charts ==
Chart (1994–95)	Peak position
Australian Albums (ARIA)	44
Belgian Albums (Ultratop Flanders)	44
New Zealand Albums (RMNZ)	24
UK Albums (OCC)	147
US Heatseekers Albums (Billboard)	21
