= The Fab Faux =

New York-based Beatles tribute band

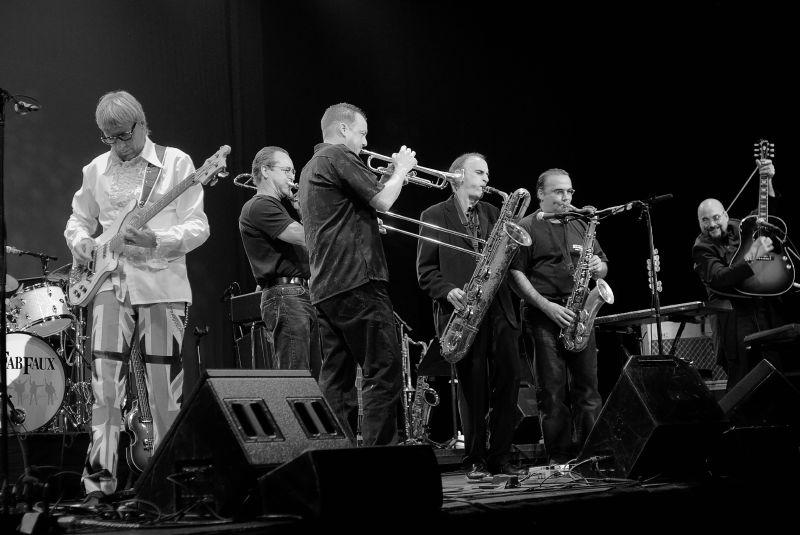
- State Theater, New Jersey (bassist Will Lee pictured to the left and Jimmy Vivino at the far right of the other musicians)

Background information
- Origin: New York City
- Genres: Rock and Roll; Beatles tribute
- Years active: 1998–present
- Label: None
- Members: Jimmy Vivino; Rich Pagano; Frank Agnello; Jack Petruzzelli; Jim Boggia
- Past members: Will Lee
- Website: thefabfaux.com

The Fab Faux is an American musical tribute band performing the works of the Beatles (whose members were often known as the "Fab Four"). The group was founded by Will Lee, bassist for Late Show with David Letterman, and features Jimmy Vivino, bandleader for Conan. Other members include Rich Pagano, Frank Agnello, Jack Petruzzelli, and Jim Boggia. The band is committed to performing live what they feel would be an accurate reproduction of the Beatles' repertoire, often performing material the Beatles never played live. The band members do not try to impersonate the members of the Beatles, instead simply playing cover songs. The band is often accompanied by a horn section (known as the Hogshead Horns) and a string section (known as the Creme Tangerine Strings) to achieve the proper sound.

Their performances in the New York City area have included the Bowery Ballroom, Webster Hall, Nokia Theater, Irving Plaza, the Beacon Theatre, the Bottom Line, and the China Club. Their shows often have themes; one show could feature a track-by-track rendering of The White Album, the next might feature all of the Beatles' psychedelic work, and another will include a full survey of the band from their Cavern Club days through to Let It Be. The Fab Faux has also performed a show of post-Beatles' solo material.

The group were featured in a full-length profile on CNN that was broadcast worldwide. They also participated in a CD of original material by Beatles tribute bands, recorded in London at Abbey Road Studios and engineered and produced by Will Schillinger. The group has performed multiple times in Liverpool, England, where they played three shows each year from 1999 to 2005 for that city's annual "Beatle Week" festivities, including outdoor concerts for over 35,000 people on the Yellow Submarine and Let It Be stages.

The band were featured in a full-page story in the August 11, 2005, issue of Rolling Stone magazine (page 22). Senior editor David Fricke wrote: "The Faux invigorate the artistry of even the Beatles' most intricate studio masterpieces with top chops and Beatlemaniac glee;" and the story's byline called The Fab Faux "The greatest Beatles cover band...without the wigs."

In an on-air interview (and accompanying print article) with National Public Radio's Ashley Kahn in January 2008, members of the band discussed their process of recreating the Beatles' material for live performance, as well as an account of a brief conversation about the band between Will Lee and Paul McCartney.

== Notable appearances ==
On February 9, 2007, the band appeared on the Late Show with David Letterman (43 years to the day, and in the very same venue, that the Beatles first appeared on the Ed Sullivan Show), marking a late-night televised cross-over of sorts, as band member Jimmy Vivino was a featured player in the Max Weinberg 7, which is the house band for Late Night with Conan O'Brien. It was also the first time a tribute band was shown on The Late Show and the second act for which members of the CBS Orchestra, Will Lee and Tom Malone, performed as members of a guest band (Paul Shaffer had performed as part of Earl Scruggs and Steve Martin's bluegrass supergroup during that group's 2001 and 2005 appearances on the show).

On March 28, 2007, the band performed on The Howard Stern Show for the second time. They performed "Sgt. Pepper's Lonely Hearts Club Band (Reprise)" and "A Day in the Life" from the Sgt. Pepper's Lonely Hearts Club Band album and "Penny Lane" and "While My Guitar Gently Weeps". Stern stated during a replay of their performances that listening to them gives him chills.

On May 8, 2008, at Madison Square Garden, the band appeared with vocalist Joan Osborne and Phish guitarist Trey Anastasio as featured performers, celebrating the 7th Annual Jammy Awards.

On September 12, 2008, the band appeared on Late Night with Conan O'Brien, once again marking a "cross-over". On September 20, 2008, the band celebrated its 10th anniversary at a sold-out show in Radio City Music Hall.

== Band members ==
=== Current members ===
- Jimmy Vivino - guitar, keys, vocals, percussion
- Rich Pagano - drums, vocals
- Frank Agnello - guitar, vocals
- Jack Petruzzelli - keys, guitar, vocals
- Jim Boggia - bass, keys, vocals, percussion

=== Former members ===
- Will Lee - bass, keys, vocals, percussion

=== Guest musicians ===
- Jerry Vivino - horns
- Sam Bortka - horns
- Bill Holloman - horns
- John Chudoba - trumpet
- Tom "Bones" Malone - horns
- Tom Timko - horns
- Lew Soloff - trumpet
- Sibel Finn - cello
- Amy Kimball - violin
- Erin Hill - harp, backing vox
- Andy York - guitar, backing vox
- Jim Boggia - guitar
- Denny Laine - guitar, backing vox
- Glen Burtnik - guitar, backing vox
