= How Sweet It Is (Joan Osborne album) =

Studio album by Joan Osborne
- Released: September 17, 2002
- Genre: Rock
- Length: 58:19
- Label: Compendia 9365
- Producer: Joan Osborne, John Leventhal, Rick DePofi

Joan Osborne chronology
| Righteous Love (2000) | How Sweet It Is (2002) | One of Us (2005) |

Professional ratings
Aggregate scores
| Source | Rating |
|---|---|
| Metacritic | 70/100 |
Review scores
| Source | Rating |
| AllMusic | 4/5 stars |
| Blender | 3/5 stars |
| PopMatters | (favorable) |
| Q | 2/5 stars |
| Rolling Stone | (favorable) |
| Uncut | 3/5 stars |

How Sweet It Is is a cover album by Joan Osborne. It was released on September 17, 2002, by Compendia.

== Track listing ==
1. "I'll Be Around" (Thom Bell, Phil Hurtt)
2. "Think" (Aretha Franklin, Teddy White)
3. "How Sweet It Is" (Lamont Dozier, Brian Holland, Eddie Holland)
4. "Smiling Faces Sometimes" (Barrett Strong, Norman Whitfield)
5. "Love's in Need of Love Today" (Stevie Wonder)
6. "These Arms of Mine" (Otis Redding)
7. "Only You Know and I Know" (Dave Mason)
8. "War" (Strong, Whitfield)
9. "Why Can't We Live Together" (Timmy Thomas)
10. "Axis: Bold as Love" (Jimi Hendrix)
11. "The Weight" (Robbie Robertson)
12. "Everybody Is a Star" (Sly Stone)

== Credits ==
Mixed By – Kevin Killen
Producer – John Leventhal, Rick Depofi
