= Relish (album) =

Studio album by Joan Osborne
- Released: March 21, 1995
- Recorded: 1994–1995
- Studios: The Crawlspace (Philadelphia, Pennsylvania); additional recording at Big Blue (Katonah, New York) and PIE Studios (Glen Cove, New York)
- Genre: Rock
- Length: 61:06
- Labels: Blue Gorilla; Mercury
- Producer: Rick Chertoff

Joan Osborne chronology
Soul Show: Live at Delta 88 (1991)	Relish (1995)	Early Recordings (1996)

Singles from Relish
- 1. "One of Us" Released: September 19, 1995; 2. "St. Teresa" Released: May 27, 1996; 3. "Right Hand Man" Released: August 1996; 4. "Ladder" Released: January 1997

Relish is the debut studio album by American singer-songwriter Joan Osborne, released on March 21, 1995. It was nominated for Album of the Year at the 38th Grammy Awards, and also earned nominations for Best New Artist and Best Female Pop Vocal Performance for Osborne. In addition, the track "One of Us" was nominated for Record of the Year and Song of the Year.

== Background ==
Relish contains songs performed in a mixture of styles: contemporary folk, rock, and pop.

Its biggest hit single, "One of Us", was used as the theme to the 2003–2005 television series Joan of Arcadia, although the show used a re-recorded version. The album and the song were both nominated for multiple Grammy Awards in 1996. The song was written by Eric Bazilian of the Hooters.

"Man in the Long Black Coat" is a cover of the Bob Dylan song from his 1989 album Oh Mercy.

The music for "Right Hand Man" is said to have been inspired by Captain Beefheart's 1972 song "Clear Spot," although the two are in different time signatures and have completely different lyrics and subject matter.

The final track, "Lumina", was used on the first episode of the HBO hit show The Sopranos. It was also used in an episode in the fourth season of the CBS hit show The Good Wife in 2013.

== Critical reception ==
Professional ratings
Review scores
Source	Rating
AllMusic	4/5 stars
Chicago Tribune	4/4 stars
Robert Christgau	(choice cut)
The Encyclopedia of Popular Music	4/5 stars
Entertainment Weekly	A−
The Guardian	3/5 stars
NME	7/10
Q	3/5 stars
Rolling Stone	4/5 stars
The Rolling Stone Album Guide	3/5 stars

The New York Times wrote: "Osborne clearly loves blues and soul, and on Relish she finds a way to use their vocabulary for the here and now. Superficially she's like [Bonnie] Raitt, applying past masters' lessons to current material, but Osborne is never far from urban grit."

== Track listing ==
No.	Title	Writer(s)	Length
1.	"St. Teresa"	Joan Osborne; Eric Bazilian; Rob Hyman; Rick Chertoff	5:20
2.	"Man in the Long Black Coat"	Bob Dylan	4:49
3.	"Right Hand Man"	Osborne; Bazilian; Hyman; Chertoff; Don Van Vliet	4:57
4.	"Pensacola"	Osborne; Bazilian; Hyman; Chertoff	4:32
5.	"Dracula Moon"	Osborne; Bazilian; Hyman; Chertoff	6:21
6.	"One of Us"	Bazilian	5:21
7.	"Ladder"	Osborne; Bazilian; Hyman; Chertoff	4:11
8.	"Spider Web"	Osborne; Chertoff; Gary Lucas; Sammy Merendino; Chris Palmaro	5:34
9.	"Let's Just Get Naked"	Osborne; Bazilian	5:08
10.	"Help Me"	Sonny Boy Williamson II; Ralph Bass	5:14
11.	"Crazy Baby"	Osborne	6:31
12.	"Lumina"	Osborne; Bazilian	3:08
Total length:			61:06

=== Notes ===
- "One of Us" contains an introduction of "The Airplane Ride," a spiritual written by J. S. McConnel and sung by Nell Hampton, under license from Alan Lomax. Used by permission.
- "Ladder" contains a sample from "Mambo Sun," written by Marc Bolan under license from Straight Ahead Productions Ltd. TRO/Essex Music International (ASCAP), as recorded by T. Rex. Used by permission.

== Personnel ==
Credits adapted from CD liner notes.

- Joan Osborne – vocals (all tracks), percussion (3, 5), acoustic guitar (11)
- Eric Bazilian – guitar (1, 3–7, 9, 12), electric guitar (11), mandolin (1), chant (1), saxophone (3), harmonica (4, 5), electric piano (6), backing vocals (6)
- Mark Egan – bass guitar (1, 3–7, 9–11)
- Rob Hyman – piano (3, 7), organ (1, 4, 5, 7), synthesizer (1, 12), electric piano (4, 5, 11), percussion (5), Mellotron (6), backing vocals (6), drums (6)
- Andy Kravitz – drums (1, 3–5, 7, 10, 11), percussion (3)

Additional personnel

- Rick Di Fonzo – acoustic guitar (2), solo guitar (2, 8)
- Sammy Merendino – drums (2, 9), rhythm collage (7, 8)
- Chris Palmaro – electric piano (2, 8), organ (7), virtual fiddle (8), Mellotron (8, 9)
- William Wittman – electric guitar (2), guitar (7)
- Rick Chertoff – percussion (3, 5)
- Leo Osborne – backing vocals (4)
- Lee Campbell – fiddle (8)
- Omar Hakim – drums (8)
- Gary Lucas – guitar (8, 10)
- Wade Schuman – harmonica (8, 10)
- Catherine Russell – backing vocals (8)

=== Production ===
- Produced by Rick Chertoff
- Tracks 1–11 recorded and mixed by William Wittman; track 12 recorded and mixed by Rob Hyman
- Assistant recording engineer at Big Blue: Mark Mason
- Additional recording and mix engineering at PIE Studios by Rob Polhemus
- Mastered by George Marino at Sterling Sound (NYC)

== Charts ==
=== Weekly charts ===
Weekly sales chart performance for Relish
Chart (1995–96)	Peak position
Australian Albums (ARIA)	12
Austrian Albums (Ö3 Austria)	8
Belgian Albums (Ultratop Flanders)	5
Belgian Albums (Ultratop Wallonia)	14
Dutch Albums (Album Top 100)	8
Finnish Albums (Suomen virallinen lista)	14
German Albums (Offizielle Top 100)	15
New Zealand Albums (RMNZ)	13
Norwegian Albums (VG-lista)	17
Scottish Albums (Official Charts)	10
Swedish Albums (Sverigetopplistan)	6
Swiss Albums (Schweizer Hitparade)	18
UK Albums (Official Charts)	5
US Billboard 200	9

=== Year-end charts ===
Annual sales chart performance for Relish
Chart (1996)	Position
Austrian Albums (Ö3 Austria)	46
Dutch Albums (Album Top 100)	94
German Albums (Offizielle Top 100)	37
New Zealand Albums (RMNZ)	42
Swiss Albums (Schweizer Hitparade)	47
UK Albums (OCC)	98
US Billboard 200	29

== Certifications and sales ==
Sales certifications for Relish
Region	Certification	Certified units/sales
Australia (ARIA)	Gold	35,000^{^}
Canada (Music Canada)	Platinum	100,000^{^}
New Zealand (RMNZ)	Gold	7,500^{^}
United Kingdom (BPI)	Gold	100,000^{^}
United States (RIAA)	3× Platinum	3,000,000^{^}
^{^} Shipments figures based on certification alone.
