= Keith Cotton =

English RL coach and former rugby league footballer

Personal information
- Full name: Keith Cotton
- Born: 15/02/1942 Pontefract, England

Playing information
- Position: Centre
Club
Years	Team	Pld	T	G	FG	P
1961–73	Featherstone Rovers	165	20	0	0	60

Coaching information
Club
Years	Team	Gms	W	D	L	W%
1976–77	Featherstone Rovers	57	37	2	18	65

Keith Cotton (birth registered first ¼ 1942) is an English former professional rugby league footballer who played in the 1960s and 1970s, and coached in the 1970s. He played at club level for Featherstone Rovers as a centre, and coached at club level for Featherstone Rovers.

== Background ==
Keith Cotton's birth was registered in Pontefract, West Riding of Yorkshire, England.

== Playing career ==
Cotton made his début for Featherstone Rovers on Saturday 4 November 1961, and he played his last match for Featherstone Rovers during the 1972–73 season.

=== Challenge Cup Final appearances ===
Cotton played at centre in Featherstone Rovers' 17-12 victory over Barrow in the 1966–67 Challenge Cup Final during the 1966–67 season at Wembley Stadium, London on Saturday 13 May 1967, in front of a crowd of 76,290.

=== County Cup Final appearances ===
Cotton played at centre in Featherstone Rovers' 7-23 defeat by Leeds in the 1970–71 Yorkshire Cup Final during the 1970–71 season at Headingley, Leeds on Saturday 21 November 1970.

=== Testimonial match ===
Cotton's benefit season at Featherstone Rovers took place during the 1973–74 season.

== Coaching career ==
=== Championship appearances ===
Cotton was the coach in Featherstone Rovers' victory in Championship during the 1976–77 season.The only time Featherstone won the Championship title. Cotton also coached at Batley, Hunslet and Bradford Northern.

=== County Cup Final appearances ===
Cotton was the coach in Featherstone Rovers' 12-16 defeat by Leeds in the 1976–77 Yorkshire Cup Final during the 1976–77 season at Headingley, Leeds on Saturday 16 October 1976, and was the coach in the 7-17 defeat by Castleford in the 1977–78 Yorkshire Cup Final during the 1977–78 season at Headingley, Leeds on Saturday 15 October 1977.
