= Joan Osborne =

American musician (born 1962)

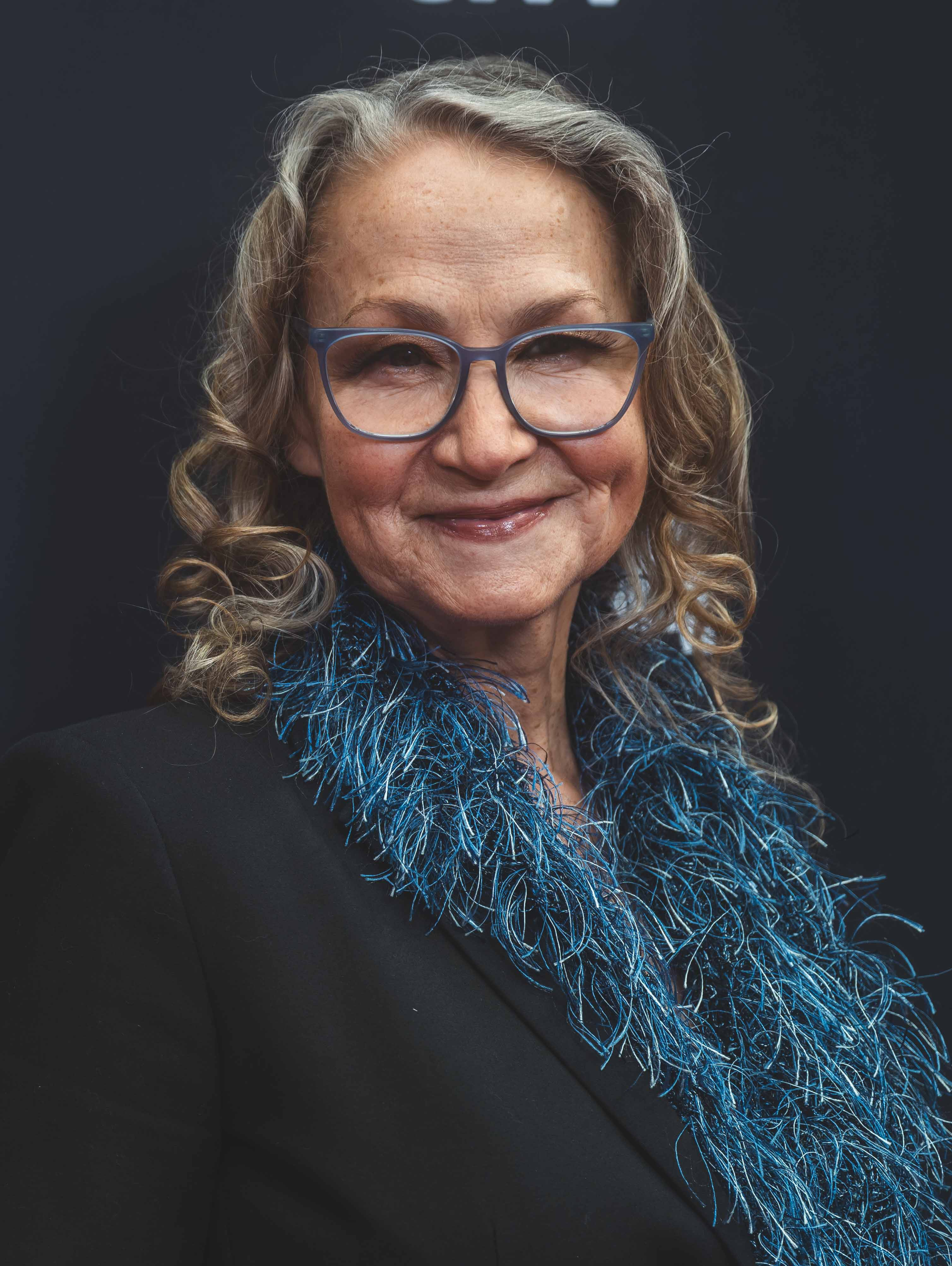
- Osborne in 2025

Background information
- Born: Joan Elisabeth Osborne; July 8, 1962 (age 64); Anchorage, Kentucky, U.S.
- Genres: Rock; folk; country rock; blues; R&B
- Occupations: Musician; songwriter
- Instruments: Vocals; guitar
- Works: Joan Osborne discography
- Years active: 1989–present
- Labels: Polydor; Mercury; Interscope; PolyGram; Universal Music
- Formerly of: The Dead, Trigger Hippy
- Website: joanosborne.com

Joan Elizabeth Osborne (born July 8, 1962) is an American singer-songwriter. She has recorded and performed in various musical genres, including rock, pop, soul, R&B, blues, and country. Her recording of the Eric Bazilian–penned song "One of Us", along with her debut album, Relish (1995), were worldwide hits and garnered a combined seven Grammy Award nominations. Osborne has toured with Motown sidemen the Funk Brothers and was featured in the documentary film about them, Standing in the Shadows of Motown (2002).

== Career ==
Originally from Anchorage, Kentucky, a suburb of Louisville, Osborne moved to New York City in the late 1980s to study filmmaking at New York University, where she had classes with documentarian George Stoney. Osborne was paying her own way through college and taking time off to earn money for another semester when she sang at an open mic night at the Abilene Café. The other musicians encouraged her to return, and she began singing weekly at the Abilene's open mic and at other blues open mics in NYC's East Village. She became immersed in NYC's live music scene, forming her own band and playing in nightclubs alongside groups like the Sweetones, Surreal McCoys, Spin Doctors, Blues Traveler, and the Holmes Brothers, and artists like Chris Whitley, Frankie Paris, and Jeff Buckley.

In 1991, she formed her own record label, Womanly Hips, to release her first full-length album, Soul Show: Live at Delta 88, and she began to tour around the Northeast, building a devoted regional following. She signed a recording contract with Rick Chertoff of Mercury Records, and released her second (and first major label) album Relish (1995), which became a hit on the strength of the single "One of Us". "Right Hand Man" and "St. Teresa" were minor hits, and "Spider Web" also received radio play. Osborne wrote and directed the second music video for "St. Teresa".

Osborne was a co-headliner for the Lilith Fair in 1997.

In 2001, Osborne produced an album for her friends the Holmes Brothers, Speaking in Tongues, engineered by Grammy winner Trina Shoemaker and featuring backing vocals from Catherine Russell, Maydie Miles, and Osborne. The album was released by Alligator Records.

In 2001, Osborne appeared on Austin City Limits, singing material mainly from Righteous Love. In a brief interview segment at the end of the episode, Osborne reflects on her gladness to have gotten out of the limelight of her mid-1990s stardom. She was featured in the 2002 documentary film Standing in the Shadows of Motown and toured with Motown sidemen the Funk Brothers. She and her band accompanied the Dixie Chicks for a national tour in the summer of 2003, during which time she also joined veteran San Francisco jam-rockers The Dead as a vocalist, and released her fourth album, titled How Sweet It Is, a collection of classic rock and soul covers.

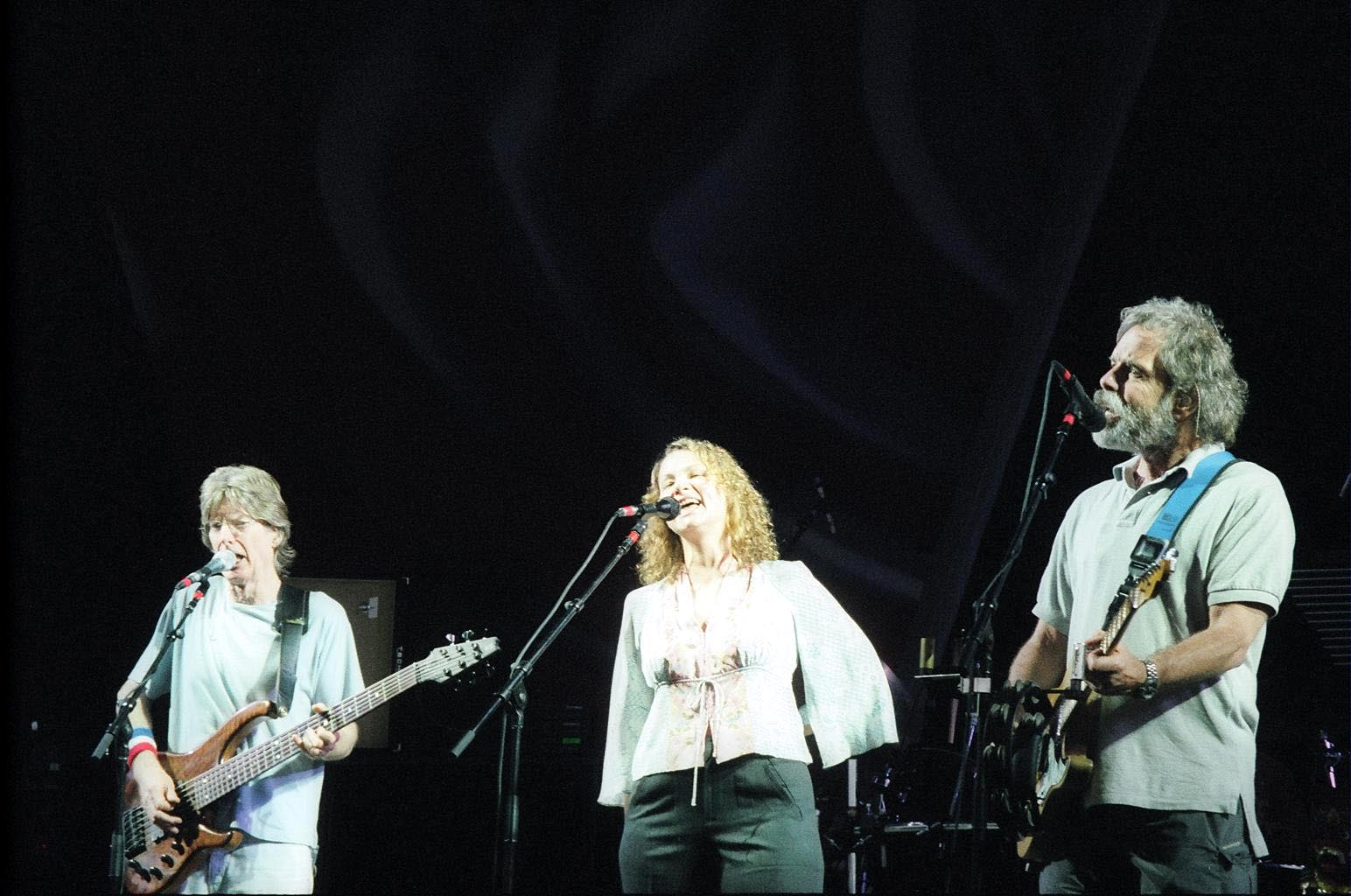
Phil Lesh, Osborne, and Bob Weir playing in Virginia Beach, Virginia, June 17, 2003

During 2005 and 2006, Osborne performed with Phil Lesh and Friends. Her vocals feature on the album Live at the Warfield.

In February 2007, she appeared on the Grand Ole Opry. In May 2007, she issued Breakfast in Bed, produced by Tor Hyams, a return to the soul music that she had covered on How Sweet It Is. Breakfast in Bed also featured the two songs ("Heatwave" and "What Becomes of the Brokenhearted") that she had covered for the film Standing in the Shadows of Motown. The same year, Osborne appeared as a featured guest in the third season of the Transatlantic Sessions television series, performing "Saint Teresa", "Holy Water", and "Please Don't Tell Me How the Story Ends".

Osborne sang lead vocals on the cover of the Willie Dixon–penned "Spoonful" on Vivian Campbell's 2005 solo album, Two Sides of If. She also provided vocals for "Wayfaring Stranger" on Spearhead's 1997 album, Chocolate Supa Highway. She interpreted "Raglan Road" for the Chieftains' 1999 album, Tears of Stone, and she covered Dolly Parton's "Do I Ever Cross Your Mind" on the 2003 tribute album Just Because I'm a Woman: Songs of Dolly Parton. She is featured on the Holmes Brothers 2007 collection State of Grace performing "Those Memories of You", an old Alan O'Bryant bluegrass tune.

Osborne released the studio album Little Wild One in September 2008. She performed as a guest vocalist on Sgt. Pepper Live, the 2009 album and DVD by Cheap Trick. In 2010, she was awarded the Woman of Achievement Award from Women's Project Theater. She performed with The Waybacks at Merlefest, 2011, during the Hillside Album hour, featuring The Allman Brothers' Eat a Peach.

In 2010, Osborne again produced an album for the Holmes Brothers on Alligator Records, Feed My Soul, which featured contributions from keyboard player Glenn Patscha.

Her album Bring It On Home was released on March 27, 2012. It is a collection of vintage blues and soul covers, and it received a 2013 Grammy Awards nomination for Best Blues Album. In September 2012, Osborne was featured in a campaign called "30 Songs / 30 Days" to support Half the Sky: Turning Oppression into Opportunity for Women Worldwide, a multi-platform media project inspired by Nicholas Kristof and Sheryl WuDunn's book.

Osborne was a member of Trigger Hippy, along with Steve Gorman, Tom Bukovac, Jackie Greene, and Nick Govrik. The band released their debut album on September 30, 2014. She announced her departure from the group on her blog in October 2018.

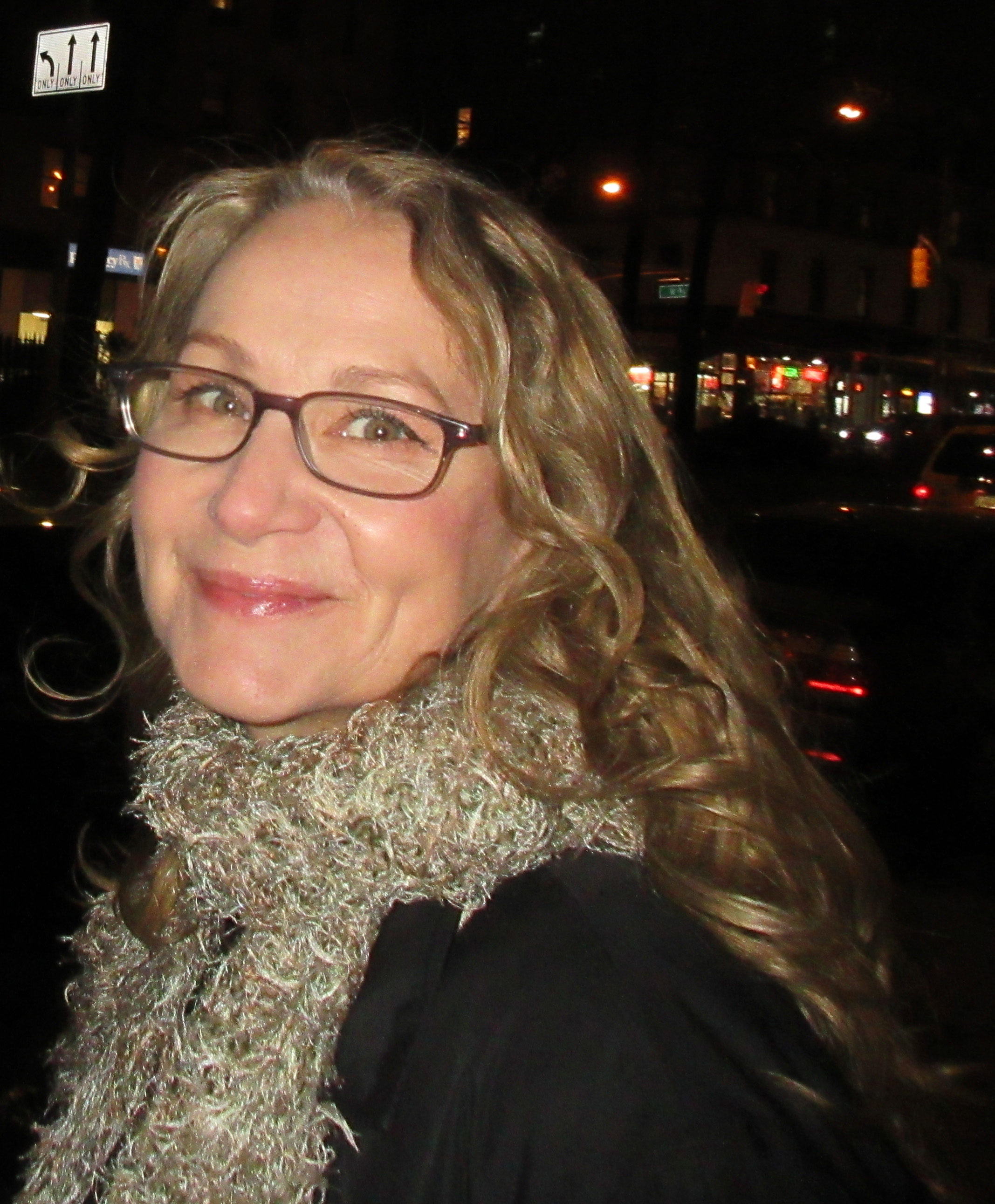
Osborne in 2018

On October 31, 2015, Osborne and Mavis Staples performed in Washington, D.C. at The George Washington University's Lisner Auditorium as part of their Solid Soul Tour.

Osborne has a history of political activism, in particular with Planned Parenthood Federation of America. She began volunteering as a PPFA clinic escort in NYC in the 1980s, has organized benefit concerts for the group, and was honored as a PPFA "Woman of the Year" in 1997 after she promoted Planned Parenthood from the Lilith Fair stage in Houston, TX, despite being expressly forbidden to do so by the arena's owners, who then blacklisted her from the venue.

Osborne released the original album Love and Hate in 2014 and followed up in 2017 with Songs of Bob Dylan, another cover album. In 2020, she published Trouble and Strife, and in 2022, she issued the live compilation Radio Waves. In 2023, Osborne released the studio album Nobody Owns You.

== Personal life ==
Originally from Anchorage, Kentucky, a suburb of Louisville, Osborne moved to New York City in the late 1980s. She has stated that she feels an attachment to the city, particularly the borough of Brooklyn. Her interest in the culture, history, and society of her Boerum Hill neighborhood has influenced her music. She has also expressed admiration for American poetry, especially the works of Walt Whitman, cited as a major inspiration for her songwriting.

Raised a Roman Catholic, Osborne distanced herself from that institution after childhood, specifically after telling her parents that she wished to become a priest, only to learn that the Church does not allow women to do so. As an adult, she regards herself as skeptical of large-scale organized religion and identifies as a "spiritual person" influenced by both Buddhism and Christianity.

Osborne has a daughter, born in December 2004.

Osborne identifies as bisexual.

== Awards and nominations ==
=== Grammy Awards ===
Grammy Awards
Year	Work	Award	Result	Ref
1996	Herself	Best New Artist	Nominated	
1996	Relish	Album of the Year	Nominated	
1996	"One of Us"	Record of the Year	Nominated	
1996	"One of Us"	Best Female Pop Vocal Performance	Nominated	
1996	"St. Teresa"	Best Female Rock Vocal Performance	Nominated	
1997	"Spider Web"	Best Female Rock Vocal Performance	Nominated	
2013	Bring It On Home	Best Blues Album	Nominated	

- "One of Us" was also nominated for the Grammy Award for Song of the Year. The nomination is credited to the songwriter, Eric Bazilian.

=== Other awards and nominations ===
Year	Awards	Work	Category	Result	Ref.
1996	MTV Europe Music Awards	Herself	Best Female	Nominated	
1996	Žebřík Music Awards	Herself	Best International Female	Nominated	
1997	Brit Awards	Herself	International Female Solo Artist	Nominated	
1997	Brit Awards	Herself	International Breakthrough Act	Nominated	
2010	Women's Project Theater	Herself	Woman of Achievement Award	Won	

== Discography ==
- Relish (1995)
- Early Recordings (1996)
- Righteous Love (2000)
- How Sweet It Is (2002)
- Christmas Means Love (2005)
- Pretty Little Stranger (2006)
- Breakfast in Bed (2007)
- Little Wild One (2008)
- Bring It On Home (2012)
- Love and Hate (2014)
- Songs of Bob Dylan (2017)
- Trouble and Strife (2020)
- Nobody Owns You (2023)

== See also ==
- List of 1990s one-hit wonders in the United States
