= One of Us (Joan Osborne song) =

1995 single by Joan Osborne

Single by Joan Osborne

from the album Relish
- B-side: "Dracula Moon"; "Crazy Baby" (live)
- Released: September 19, 1995
- Studio: The Crawlspace (Philadelphia, Pennsylvania); Add.: Big Blue (Katonah, New York), PIE (Glen Cove, New York)
- Genre: Alternative pop
- Length: 5:21; 4:15 (edit)
- Label: Blue Gorilla; Mercury
- Songwriter: Eric Bazilian
- Producer: Rick Chertoff

Joan Osborne singles chronology
"One of Us" (1995)	"St. Teresa" (1996)

Music video
- "One of Us" on YouTube

"One of Us" is a song by American singer Joan Osborne for her debut studio album, Relish (1995). Written by Eric Bazilian of the Hooters and produced by Rick Chertoff, the song was released on September 19, 1995, by Blue Gorilla and Mercury Records as the lead single from Relish and as Osborne's debut single. It became a chart hit, peaking at number four on the US Billboard Hot 100, becoming Osborne's only charting single and earning three Grammy nominations: Song of the Year, Record of the Year and Best Female Pop Vocal Performance.

"One of Us" was also a hit around the world, topping the charts of Australia, Canada, Flanders, Israel, and Sweden while reaching number six on the UK Singles Chart and becoming a top-20 hit in at least 12 other countries. The song went on to serve as the opening theme for the American television series Joan of Arcadia. The music video for "One of Us" was directed by Mark Seliger and Fred Woodward, and filmed in Coney Island, New York City. In 2007, the song was ranked at number 54 on VH1's "100 Greatest Songs of the '90s" and number ten on the network's "40 Greatest One Hit Wonders of the '90s".

== Composition and recording ==
Regarding his experience of writing "One of Us", Eric Bazilian said: "I wrote that song one night—the quickest song I ever wrote—to impress a girl. Which worked, because we're married and have two kids." The girl in question was Sarah, a Swedish girl he met on a plane when the Hooters were flying in to play in a festival in Sweden. He invited her to Philadelphia when he was making Joan Osborne's album Relish together with Rob Hyman and Rick Chertoff. While they were watching a documentary on the making of the Beatles' Sgt. Pepper's Lonely Hearts Club Band, she became interested in four-track recording and asked him to record one. Bazilian had a guitar riff that he had been playing that day, so he recorded that expanded into a song. However, he did not have the lyrics, so he tried to write the lyrics after she fell asleep. He had the voice of Brad Roberts (with whom he recorded a demo in 1994) from Crash Test Dummies in his mind when he wrote the lyrics. He had trouble finishing the line "a stranger on the bus", and Sarah suggested "Tryin' to make his way home?" after she woke up. As for the line "Just a slob like one of us", Bazilian said that he did not intend to mean God was a slob, but rather that the song is about human beings.

Bazilian recorded a demo of "One of Us", which was later used as a hidden track on his first solo album (The Optimist). Bazilian had intended to send the demo to Crash Test Dummies, but played the demo to Chertoff and Osborne. He said: "And it really hadn't even occurred to me that it was something that Joan might do, but Rick, in his wisdom, asked Joan if she thought she could sing it." Osborne agreed to record the song, singing to a live demo of a guitar. Bazilian said of the recording: "And when I got into my car and popped the cassette in, I started practising the Grammy speech that I should've gotten to give."

At the start of the song, a fragment of a song by a 1930s singer named Nell Hampton was added. Osborne had heard the song on an album of Appalachian folk songs and Chertoff suggested using it after Osborne played the song in the studio. For the lead and solo, Bazilian used his 1954 Gibson Gold Top Les Paul for the studio recording.

== Lyrics ==
The song deals with various aspects of questioning God's anthropomorphism ("What if God was one of us?") inviting the listener to question how one might relate to such a God: for example "Would you call [God's name] to his face?" or "Would you want to see [God's face] if seeing meant that you would have to believe in things like heaven and in Jesus and the saints and all the prophets?"

The album version starts off with the first four lines of a recording titled "The Aeroplane Ride", made on October 27, 1937, by American folklorist Alan Lomax and his wife Elizabeth for the Archive of American Folk Song at the Library of Congress, with Mrs. Nell Hampton of Salyersville, Kentucky, singing a variation of the 1928 John S. McConnell hymn "Heavenly Aeroplane".

== Critical reception ==
Roch Parisien from AllMusic named the song "a simple, direct statement of faith, honest and unadorned, one framed in a near-perfect chorus and delectable Neil Young-ish guitar riff". Melody Maker wrote, "For appalling lyrics combined with enormous success though, no one could touch God-botherer Joan Osborne. Check out these lines from her extraordinary 'One of Us'—What if God were one of us/Just a slob like one of us/Just a stranger on the bus/Trying to make his way home/Like a holy rolling stone/Nobody calling on the phone/'Cept for the Pope, maybe, in Rome." Alan Jones from Music Week commented, "Joan Osborne has come up with a delicious debut single 'One of Us' – an electrically charged and retro-styled song with an intimate vocal. The track addresses the question 'What if God was one of us?, just a slob like one of us' placing him on the bus and taking phone calls from the Pope, doing so with humour, energy and a great tune, in a taut clutter-free production. A real find." Paul Evans from Rolling Stone said it "imagines a God as hurt as any human".

== Music video ==
The accompanying music video for "One of Us" was directed by Mark Seliger and Fred Woodward, and was mainly filmed at Coney Island. It intercuts shots of attractions (roller coasters, ferris wheels and the New York Aquarium) with vintage-style sepia-tone images and shots of Osborne singing in front of the camera.

== Track listings ==
- US and Australian CD and cassette single
1. "One of Us" (album version) – 5:21
2. "Dracula Moon" – 6:21
- European CD single and UK cassette single
1. "One of Us" (edit) – 4:16
2. "One of Us" (album version) – 5:21
- UK CD single
1. "One of Us" (edit) – 4:16
2. "Dracula Moon" – 6:21
3. "One of Us" – 5:21
4. "Crazy Baby" (live from Fox Theatre) – 8:06

== Personnel ==
- Joan Osborne – lead vocals
- Eric Bazilian – guitars, backing vocals, electric piano
- Mark Egan – bass
- Rob Hyman – drums, Mellotron, backing vocals
- William Wittman – engineering, mixing

== Charts ==
=== Weekly charts ===
Weekly chart performance for "One of Us"
Chart (1995–1996)	Peak position
Australia (ARIA)	1
Austria (Ö3 Austria Top 40)	13
Belgium (Ultratop 50 Flanders)	1
Belgium (Ultratop 50 Wallonia)	4
Canada Top Singles (RPM)	1
Canada Adult Contemporary (RPM)	5
Canada Rock/Alternative (RPM)	1
Czech Republic (IFPI CR)	2
Denmark (IFPI)	2
Europe (Eurochart Hot 100)	7
Finland (Suomen virallinen lista)	19
France (SNEP)	10
Germany (GfK)	18
Hungary (Mahasz)	2
Iceland (Íslenski Listinn Topp 40)	2
Ireland (IRMA)	8
Israel (Israeli Singles Chart)	1
Italy Airplay (Music & Media)	3
Netherlands (Dutch Top 40)	12
Netherlands (Single Top 100)	14
New Zealand (Recorded Music NZ)	11
Norway (VG-lista)	2
Scottish Singles Sales (Official Charts)	5
Sweden (Sverigetopplistan)	1
UK Singles (Official Charts)	6
US Billboard Hot 100	4
US Adult Alternative Airplay (Billboard)	16
US Adult Contemporary (Billboard)	20
US Adult Pop Airplay (Billboard)	16
US Alternative Airplay (Billboard)	7
US Mainstream Rock (Billboard)	26
US Pop Airplay (Billboard)	2
US Cash Box Top 100	3
US Adult Alternative Top 30 Tracks (Radio & Records)	1

=== Year-end charts ===
Year-end chart performance for "One of Us"
Chart (1996)	Position
Australia (ARIA)	6
Belgium (Ultratop 50 Flanders)	8
Belgium (Ultratop 50 Wallonia)	16
Canada Top Singles (RPM)	16
Canada Adult Contemporary (RPM)	50
Canada Rock/Alternative (RPM)	46
Europe (Eurochart Hot 100)	26
France (SNEP)	55
Germany (Media Control)	67
Iceland (Íslenski Listinn Topp 40)	9
Israel (Israeli Singles Chart)	49
Netherlands (Dutch Top 40)	69
Norway (VG-lista)	10
Sweden (Topplistan)	31
UK Singles (OCC)	63
UK Airplay (Music Week)	30
US Billboard Hot 100	30
US Modern Rock Tracks (Billboard)	60
US Top 40/Mainstream (Billboard)	14

== Certifications ==
Sales and certifications for "One of Us"
Region	Certification	Certified units/sales
Australia (ARIA)	Platinum	70,000^{^}
Belgium (BRMA)	Gold	25,000^{*}
Brazil (Pro-Música Brasil)	Gold	30,000^{‡}
Norway (IFPI Norway)	Platinum	
United States (RIAA)	Gold	500,000^{^}
^{*} Sales figures based on certification alone.^{^} Shipments figures based on certification alone.^{‡} Sales+streaming figures based on certification alone.

== Release history ==
Release dates and formats for "One of Us"
Region	Date	Format(s)	Label(s)	Ref.
United States	September 19, 1995	Contemporary hit radio	Blue Gorilla; Mercury	
Australia	November 13, 1995	CD; cassette	Blue Gorilla; Mercury	
United States	November 21, 1995	CD	Blue Gorilla; Mercury	
United Kingdom	January 29, 1996	CD; cassette	Mercury	
Japan	February 25, 1996	CD	Blue Gorilla; Mercury	

== Cover versions and parodies ==
- In 1996, Canadian dance music group Outta Control released their version which charted on the dance charts of both Canada and the US, charting at numbers 9 and 36, respectively.
- Also in 1996, Prince covered this song on his album Emancipation, with backing vocals from his wife Mayte Garcia.
- Bob Rivers wrote the parody "What If God Smoked Cannabis?" in 1997 (often incorrectly attributed to "Weird Al" Yankovic).
- The song is covered on the Glee episode "Grilled Cheesus", by the actors Jenna Ushkowitz, Lea Michele, Cory Monteith, Amber Riley, Chris Colfer, and Dianna Agron.

== See also ==
- List of number-one singles in Australia during the 1990s
- List of RPM Rock/Alternative number-one singles (Canada)
- List of Swedish number-one hits
- Ultratop 50 number-one hits of 1996
