= Lion (Stephen Lynch album) =

2012 album by Stephen Lynch

Studio album and Live album by Stephen Lynch
- Released: November 13, 2012
- Recorded: July 10, 2012
- Genre: Comedy
- Label: What Are Records?
- Producers: Stephen Lynch, Dean Sharenow

Stephen Lynch chronology
3 Balloons (2009)	Lion (2012)	My Old Heart (2019)

Professional ratings
Review scores
Source	Rating
Allmusic	4/5 stars

Lion is the fifth album by American musician, comedian, and actor Stephen Lynch, released in 2012. The first half of the album was recorded at Studio G! (Nashville, Tennessee) and the second half of the album was recorded live from Symphony Space (New York City).

Lynch told interviewer Dylan Gadino, "I wanted this album to have the Americana flavor to it that I love so much in the music of, say, Neil Young or Patty Griffin or Ray LaMontagne. I think it does... And, I'm confident the songs are still funny, if a bit subtler than some of my earlier work. Astute listeners will detect a slight shift of direction, comedy-wise. Musically, it's the best work I've ever done. I'm a little bit in love with it." Jason McGorty wrote that the album is "close to perfecting the genre."

== Background ==
Lynch told interviewer John Liberty, an online journalist, that he was "riding his bicycle while listening to his iPod on shuffle when it randomly selected an old mix from his last studio album." Lynch told Mr. Liberty, "I realized how much I didn't like it." Therefore, he "set out to create a musically satisfying album first. The jokes came second." Lynch added, "Really, I just wanted to make a great record of music you could listen to without paying attention to the words... I threw a lot away. I wasn't going to settle for something just because it was funny. I wanted it to resonate with me."

He told interviewer Keith BieryGolick, Managing Editor of The News Record, "I realize that I wrote most of the old material, at least from the first two-and-a-half records, when I was so young. I was probably a teenager or in my early 20s. So it gives me sort of douche-chills when I listen to them now because I'm definitely a different person from who I was back then." Lynch added, "It took me a long time to sort of figure out what kind of musician I was. That's why I took so long to write this record, because I wanted to do it right this time... I wanted it to be the kind of thing I would listen to if I hadn't written it myself." BieryGolick wrote that the album is "his most mature": "That acceptance of growth and maturation has again left Lynch at a crossroads between what people expect of him, and what he actually wants to do." Lynch told him, "I'm not trying to write a jazz fusion record, but I'm also trying not to write 13 novelty songs. It's sort of a doubly hard task to not only try to write a good song, but then lyrically you have to garner a certain response from people, which is laughter — and if you don't, then it doesn't matter how good the song is, it's sort of a failure." Lynch added, "There's a chance that some people will be like, 'You're not singing songs about gerbils in your ass' but that's OK. They don't have to like it. There will hopefully be other people who will."

Lynch also told BieryGolick, "I don’t consider myself a guitar-comedian because my goal isn't to make people laugh by using a guitar as a prop. I'm just a songwriter who happens to have an end goal of being funny when I play my songs. To me, it's always about the song, and it's all about the songwriting and the craftsmanship of the song. That has to be there. If not, you're just a guy who can get up on stage and do a parody of a song or an impression of somebody." In his review, BieryGolick wrote, "With Lion, Lynch proves to be much more than that."

=== Lynch's lyrical reputation ===
Reviewer Nick A. Zaino III wrote: "Lynch has always reveled in that contrast between sweet music and scatological content." Keith BieryGolick wrote, "He began performing humorous songs at clubs and underground music venues in Manhattan after moving to New York in 1996. Lynch made it big by using his angelic, choirboy voice to push the envelope with songs about 'Special' friends ("I'd play soldier/ He'd eat dirt/ I liked math, and the spelling bee / Ed liked talking to a tree") and a 'Gerbil' used for unsavory purposes ("I bought a gerbil at the petting zoo / If Richard Gere can do it I can too")." (Both songs are from the 2000 album A Little Bit Special.)

John Seaborn Gray, likewise, said in a review of a 2009 concert, "Lynch's songs certainly help to establish the tone. Beautifully written, the clash between the coarse, often shocking subject matter with the serene and lovely music lends a spirit of playful anarchy to the show. Nothing is sacred, and nothing is to be taken too seriously." Gray added, "It is the talent of a veteran comic to chastise his audience and make them happy for it. No matter how many unruly, drunken fans shouted for their favorite songs, Lynch was able to head them off with ... a short, sharp retort ("I am not a jukebox, assholes!") without seeming resentful..."

Grant V. Ziegler, Editor-in-Chief of The North Lake College News-Register, gives another sample of Lynch's combined notoriety and prestige: "Envision two beautiful angels coming down from heaven and having the prettiest voices you've ever heard. But instead of them speaking softly to you with encouraging words they fill your ears with obscenities while singing about the most offensive topics known to humankind." He adds that Lynch is a "self-proclaimed 'musician trapped in the body of a comedian'." Ziegler writes, ruefully, in a review of a March, 2013 concert: "Unfortunately, most of the audience was only familiar with Lynch's older material..."

== Music and lyrics ==
Half of the album was recorded in studio, and the other half performed live. Nick Zaino writes that, on Lion, Lynch "offers both studio and live versions of 13 tracks and takes the musical side of musical comedy a step further, making it an equal partner with the comedy. Fans of Americana and acoustic musical could listen to the studio half of Lion and hear a delicate, finely produced album. That is, if they could ignore the lyrics about Juggalos, queer tattoos and a monumental case of whiskey dick."

Lynch told Mr. Liberty, "In general, the album is a little less frenetic, it's softer. More thoughtful. There are more spaces between the jokes..." Many of the songs are almost ballad-like, in comparison with older, more rocking songs such as "Craig" and "Kitten" (a.k.a. "Kill a Kitten").

For some of the change in the sound of the music, Zaino credits Lynch's working with guitarist and Nashville producer Doug Lancio (who has collaborated with Patty Griffin, Steve Earle and John Hiatt). About the B-side recorded live, Zaino said, "The live disc sparkles musically as well, proving the smooth sound isn't just studio trickery. Lynch, [Courtney] Jaye and a few backing musicians change the arrangements slightly from the studio versions."

=== "Tattoo" ===
In a review of a March, 2013 concert, Grant Ziegler wrote that the song might become "a new fan favorite." Of the crowd's response, he said, "It directly offended nearly half of the audience, as it was about the horrible tattoos people get nowadays. From attacking Japanese typography, tribal marks, lower back tattoos and any other generic overused logo, this song systematically offended just about everyone's body art. This was the first song of the night where Courtney Jaye joined in and immediately the audience could recognize the chemistry between her and Lynch. Their duets were nearly perfect, aside from one or two minor lyrical flubs. But never before has anyone heard such beautiful voices sing such vile material together." Ellie Rulon-Miller described it in The Massachusetts Daily Collegian at University of Massachusetts Amherst: "a quiet yet upbeat-sounding song about the various types of common embarrassing tattoos. Jaye's harmonies add a lot of humor to the song; her voice is made for alternative-pop and is undeniably pretty, yet she is using it to harmonize with lines like 'Your child's name with the words 'be strong' would be beautiful, but they spelled 'strong' wrong.'"

Keith BieryGolick wrote, "In the album's opening track, 'Tattoo,' he sings, 'You think that symbol in Japanese / Means strength or honor/ Ni**a please/ It means queer tattoo.' Earlier in his career, 'Tattoo' would have been about gay tattoos, but now it's about tattoos in line with the literal meaning of the word — odd or bad." Lynch told him in an interview, "You know what I decided when I wrote that song, I decided for too long the word queer has been domain of the bullies, the bigots and the homophobes of the world. I'm taking that shit back. I'm going to restore it to its original glory, because that is such a great word."

=== "No Meat" ===
Keith BieryGolick wrote, "Even with his newfound maturity, old habits die hard — especially on the song 'No Meat,' which is about Lynch's recently adopted vegan lifestyle. 'A handful of trail mix, mmmm what a treat / How about some soy yogurt served in a bowl? / I'd rather eat a hobo's asshole,' he sang. The song also provides the album's best line, one which hopefully will be adopted by meat-lovers nationwide, when Lynch sings, 'Tofurkey tofuck yourself / I want some meat.'"

=== "So This Is Outer Space?" ===
Jason McGorty wrote, "'So This Is Outer Space?' slows things down a bit, but not a complete waste. While the chorus clearly now says 'You're on Acid' I originally thought it said 'You're at Macy's' which I still think is a bit funnier. The punchlines in the versus generally concern acid-related clichés like face-melting and brain-eating spiders but the bridge is where things become a bit interesting when we're introduced to the monkey character Ramon. The musical change here is a bit drastic and truly sounds Jonathan Coulton inspired".

=== "Lorelei" ===
Reviewer Nick Zaino wrote that Lynch "isn't afraid to write a beautiful number like 'Lorelei', one that wouldn't sound out of place next to Emmylou Harris, Alison Krauss and Gillian Welch singing Down from the Mountain. 'Didn't Leave Nobody But the Baby' on the O Brother, Where Art Thou? soundtrack." Zaino added, somewhat disapprovingly, that "Lorelai" is "a litany of women the narrator has been with, plus their deficiencies. (Mary Claire's is especially disturbing.)" Grant Ziegler wrote of a March, 2013 concert, "'Lorelei' disgusted and amused the audience, as the lyrics were all about Lynch's ex-girlfriends who had one sort of deformity or another." Rulon-Miller wrote that the "piano-driven tune about a few women with defects such as a lazy eye and unusual body odor, turns into a ballad of sorts. An organ makes a subtle entrance, giving it a subtle blues feel. While musically the song is enjoyable, it falls short lyrically as Lynch's humor falls flat."

=== "Lion" ===
Georgette Gilmore described the song as a man "telling his potential paramour all the things he won't be doing for her (he ain't fightin' no Lion)." Rulon-Miller wrote, "One highlight on the album is the title track, a musical duel between two men for the heart of a woman. Lynch has done a similar duet in the past; 'Best Friend Song' [from his album Superhero] featured Lynch's friend Mark Teich and also highlighted differences between the two singers, ending with Lynch scream-singing that he wanted to sleep with Teich's young sister. 'Lion' has a poppy, sing-along feel to it."

=== "Tennessee" ===
When Lynch started writing the tune, the song was going to be about Michigan. "It's just Tennessee is easier to rhyme, (A). And (B), it was in the news at the time I started writing the song for a lot of really weird, backwards ideas that were coming out of Tennessee," he told interviewer John Liberty. Lynch said that, on stage, the song has "been one of the highlights". The Ultimate Guitar site reviewer wrote, "This excerpt from 'Tennessee' is a perfect example of Lynch's comedy, "The birth place of Aretha queen of soul, BB King and Al Gore, I'm not saying it's a sh-t hole, But they don't live there anymore." Reviewer Nick Zaino wrote that "Tennessee" is "a predictable broadside against meth-cooking hillbillies." Grant Ziegler called the song "beautiful, but offensive" and added, "it's also where Jaye is from. Jaye, who looks and sounds way too innocent to be on this tour, was a good sport about the song and the constant ribbing from the band."

=== "Let Me Inside" ===
Zaino writes that "Let Me Inside" "plays against more crude expectations" (that is, it's not as shocking as a Lynch fan might expect, given that the lyrics suggest the narrator is an emotionally distraught stalker). Reviewer Matthew Fugere's opinion was that "trying to convince someone to let you inside a house ... sounds the most mundane, but 'Let Me Inside' is actually one of the funniest songs on Lion."

=== "The Night I Laid You Down" ===
Piet Levy of the Milwaukee Journal Sentinel wrote, "The best song on the album is the most subtle: a tender duet called 'The Night I Laid You Down' that slowly unravels to become a lovers' quarrel over the music that was playing on the night in question." (The couple argue whether the song they listened to during their night of passion was by Phil Collins, Mike and the Mechanics, or Peter Gabriel.) Nick Zaino wrote, similarly, "Credit some of Lynch's cohorts for helping create a lush musical backdrop. Courtney Jaye sings backup and the occasional duet, and her voice is gorgeous on 'The Night I Laid You Down,' a musical argument over what song was playing the first time a couple made love. It's pretty and playful, and in the post-song banter, there's a clear feeling of 'What the hell am I doing here?' in Jaye's voice. Lynch seems to relish making her swear or sing something off-color, contrasting with the purity of her voice. It's especially effective on the live disc." The Ultimate Guitar site reviewer wrote, "The banter between the two of them is spectacular. This song is one of those songs that by itself is beautiful, but the words are sure to make you laugh." Jason McGorty, in a mixed review of the song, wrote that it's "the highlight of the album" and "undeniably original," adding, "The live version is interesting as it reveals what the audience finds funny. Apparently, the word Phil Collins on its own is laugh-inducing."

=== Whiskey Dick ===
The Ultimate Guitar site reviewer recommends the song: "Simple, easy, hilarious."

=== "Hey Love" ===
Michael Edwards of Selig Film News reviewed the song favorably, calling it "the new 'Love Hurts'."

=== "Too Jesusy" ===
John Liberty wrote that the song is "about a woman whose spirituality gets in the way of a relationship. Lynch said it's not an indictment of people who believe in Jesus, but rather commentary on people 'who decide that what they believe in is what everyone should believe in'." "You don't need to shove it down my throat," Lynch said.

(Lynch is the son of a former priest and a former nun, and has written other songs which critique or spoof religious themes, such as "Priest", "Craig" and "Beelz".)

=== "You'll Do" ===
Reviewer Fugere thought that the song "takes the rather unoriginal concept of the desperation that can be found during a bar's closing time and adds a few funny lines to it. It's not a terrible song, but it really does not fit in with the rest of the album."

== Singles ==
The only single released from the album was "Tattoo".

== Track listing ==
All songs by Stephen Lynch.

=== Side A ===
1. "Tattoo" – 4:19
2. "No Meat" – 4:13
3. "So This Is Outer Space?" – 4:55
4. "Lorelei" – 4:56
5. "Lion" – 4:09
6. "Tennessee" – 5:09
7. "Let Me Inside" – 3:27
8. "The Night I Laid You Down" – 5:20
9. "Too Jesusy" – 3:20
10. "The Gathering" – 3:30
11. "You'll Do" – 4:16
12. "Whiskey Dick" – 5:04
13. "Hey Love" – 4:15

=== Side B ===
1. "Lorelei" (Live) – 5:52
2. "Tattoo" (Live) – 5:49
3. "Let Me Inside" (Live) – 4:03
4. "The Night I Laid You Down" (Live) – 5:04
5. "Too Jesusy" (Live) – 5:00
6. "No Meat" (Live) – 6:45
7. "So This Is Outer Space?" (Live) – 6:17
8. "Hey Love" (Live) – 6:34
9. "Whiskey Dick" (Live) – 6:43
10. "The Gathering" (Live) – 4:28
11. "You'll Do" (Live) – 4:55
12. "Tennessee" (Live) – 5:33
13. "Lion" (Live) – 4:00

== Credits ==
- Stephen Lynch – Composer, Fender Rhodes, Guitar, Guitar (Acoustic), Piano, Primary Artist, Producer, Vocals
- Rod Cone – Vocals, Vocals (Background)
- Courtney Jaye – Vocals
- David Josefsberg – Vocals
- Charlie King – Banjo, Dobro, Harmonica, Lap Steel Guitar, Mandolin, Vocals, Vocals (Background)
- David Below – Drums, Percussion, Vocals (Background)
- Ivan Bodley – Bass
- Rich Campbell – Piano
- Tom Capek – Mastering
- Frank Cicero – Photography
- John Deadrick – Organ, Piano
- Erin Dwight – Cover Art (Dwight is Lynch's wife)
- Sarah Hall – Public Relations
- David Henry – Cello
- Scott Hull – Mastering
- Doug Lancio – Baritone, Engineer, Guitar (Electric), Mixing, Percussion, Producer
- Jon Lurie – Audio Technician
- Tim Marks – Bass
- Nick Newberry – Assistant Engineer, Fender Rhodes
- Brad Pimberton – Drums
- Jillian Reitsma – Layout
- Steven Remote – Location Recording Engineer
- Peter Sachon – Cello
- Dean Sharenow – Engineer, Mixing, Producer
- Amanda Stevens – Photography
- Felix Toro – Audio Technician

== Reception ==
In late 2012, Lion debuted at No. 1 on iTunes and Amazon.com.

Reggie Edwards of The Front Row Report gave the album a rating of 8.5 out of 10, saying, "The entire album has a softer, more camp-firey feel to it; almost a folksy feel... When you factor that in with the off-the-wall lyrics of hilarity that ensue from Lynch, this is a home run." The Ultimate Guitar site rated the album 8 out of 10, rating the lyrics 9 out of 10: "The tone of his voice is rich... In traditional fashion, the songs are all light hearted and really do sound beautiful. In fact, if you re-wrote the lyrics with the same melodies, you could really have some amazing songs. I guess that's what makes the album so appealing. Lynch takes the time to write excellent vocal lines, and writes amazing guitar melodies only to write songs about 'queer tattoos' or hillbillies in Tennessee... Every song is funny or entertaining in some way. Lynch has described himself as 'a musician trapped in a comedian's body,' and that could not be a more spot on observation. Not only are the lyrics hilarious, but Lynch's delivery is perfect and allows for the most impact. I find myself listening to songs multiple times just to fully process what he's actually saying, and I laugh just as hard each and every time."

Amber Pittman of The Covington News wrote, "Like a cyclone of humor and downright dirty wit, Stephen Lynch took the stage at The Varity [i.e. Variety] Playhouse Thursday evening to promote his newest album Lion... I was, as ever, impressed by both his live show and his new album. For those unfamiliar with Lynch, think Adam Sandler - if he could sing and didn't make those stupid faces. With an intelligent frat boy air, he weaves tales of the most honest and oftentimes, offensive things. Expect cursing, expect to be a little offended; but somehow, you end up liking it and wanting just a tiny bit more... But even though he's learned to share [with Jaye], the focus never shifts from his hilarious lyrics, which in no way hide the fact that under the profanity and humor, there lies a seriously talented musician."

Tyler Maas, reviewing a tour concert just a few days after the album's release, declared, "Stephen Lynch is a modern day renaissance man. The accomplished stand-up comic, and Tony Award-nominated actor also fancies himself a musician more than anything else... Lynch and a skilled cast of accompanying talent treated a jam-packed crowd to an evening of explicit entertainment that combined great music, a treasure trove of crude humor and even a bit of prepared stage-patter to tie it all together." Maas praised Lynch's "undeniable vocal range, his unique song topics and stage presence throughout" and summed up: "While too raunchy to be taken seriously as a musician, and too musical to earn respect from some of his comedic brethren, Lynch's knack for both mediums puts him in a class all his own."

Reviewer Nick Zaino wrote that "there are songs on Lion that are so enchanting it would be easy to lose the words. Frequently funny songs are arranged and/or mixed to keep the music from distracting from the joke." In conclusion, Zaino said, "And of course the whole enterprise is helped by the between-song patter. Rarely has something so beautiful been so apt to also make you giggle like an idiot."

Piet Levy of the Milwaukee Journal Sentinel wrote, "He primarily writes and performs pretty singer-songwriter gems that recall Death Cab for Cutie's Ben Gibbard. Tracks like 'Tattoo' and 'Tennessee' are more mean-spirited than funny, although they elicit laughs when the target suddenly becomes Lynch's own songwriting shortcomings. There's plenty of profanity here, but because Lynch sings with the sensitivity of a poet, it minimizes the shock value and wink-wink showboating Lion could have easily become."

In a four-star review, Chuck Campbell of the Knoxville News Sentinel wrote, "He's still largely regarded as a comic who sings and plays guitar, but his new Lion shows expanded commitment and growth in the musical arena for Lynch, who recorded the release in Nashville with a full roster of supporting talent. The result is a folkie, Americana sound that could easily stand apart from the droll lyrics as it breezes along with the likes of piano, banjo, mandolin, organ, cello and occasional dueting vocals from Courtney Jaye."

Matthew Fugere of the website The Comic's Comic wrote, "From a musical stance, Lion moves far past Lynch's previous albums. He really nails a specific genre and style that works with the entire album." Fugere found fault with a few songs and said that "Lion falls short of being Lynch's funniest album, but it's still a great addition to an already hilarious discography..." The review praises "Let Me Inside" as "one of the funniest songs" on a "well produced and very polished" album. Michael Edwards of Selig Film News, in a review of a 2013 concert held at House of Blues Dallas, wrote, "While watching the rapport between the performers, there was never any doubt all four were having a great time and that sense of fun made the show all the better for those in attendance. ... To anyone that has a cast iron stomach when it comes to 'offensive' comedy, I can guarantee you a never-ending evening of laughter if you are lucky enough to find yourself in the audience of a Stephen Lynch concert. From language to subject matter, nothing is off limits... and it shouldn't be."

== Charts ==
=== Weekly charts ===
Chart (2012–13)	Peak position
US Top Current Albums (Billboard)	181
US Heatseekers Albums (Billboard)	3
US Independent Albums (Billboard)	33
US Top Comedy Albums (Billboard)	1

=== Year-end charts ===
Chart (2013)	Position
US Top Comedy Albums (Billboard)	6
