= Here and Somewhere Else =

Studio album by the Samples
- Released: 1998
- Genre: Pop
- Label: What Are Records?
- Producer: The Samples

The Samples chronology
Transmissions from the Sea of Tranquility (1997)	Here and Somewhere Else (1998)	The Tan Mule (1998)

Here and Somewhere Else is an album by the American band the Samples, released in 1998. It marked a return to What Are Records?, following 1996's MCA Records-released Outpost. The band supported the album with a North American tour that included shows with Ziggy Marley and the Melody Makers. Several of the album's songs were marketed to adult album alternative radio stations.

== Production ==
Produced by the band, the album was released as an enhanced CD, with footage of the recording sessions. The band added three new members prior to the sessions: drummer Kenny James, keyboardist Alex Matson, and guitarist Rob Somers. The Samples strove for a poppier sound, with shorter songs and lyrics pushed to the front, and spent two years working on the album. The majority of the songs were written by frontman Sean Kelly, who thought they were the most radio-friendly of the band's career; he also thought that the band's style would change as they became more accomplished musicians. The ska-influenced "We All Move On" employs a horn section.

== Critical reception ==
Professional ratings
Review scores
Source	Rating
AllMusic	4.5/5 stars

The Portland Press Herald deemed the album "vintage Samples: bright melodies sitting atop buoyant pop arrangements, inflected here and there with reggae." The Wisconsin State Journal considered it "reminiscent of their 1992 pop-flavored No Room." The Denver Post called Here and Somewhere Else "an exquisite pop-oriented album packed with radio-ready songs, featuring the most consistent tunesmanship of any Samples disc to date," writing that "behind the tunes are smart, elaborate arrangements and fine production craftsmanship."

The Richmond Times-Dispatch opined that the three best songs were "We All Move On", "Losing End of Distance", and "Little People". The Herald-Times labeled Here and Somewhere Else "a relentlessly upbeat pop album, full of positive lyrics and grooving music." The Tennessean noted that "soft, adult-contemporary vibes mixed with a bit ... of Gen-X angst 'n' jangle."

AllMusic wrote: "One of America's most talented (and mostly unknown) bands of the '90s, the Samples made a giant leap on this release."

== Track listing ==
No.	Title	Length
1.	"We All Move On"
2.	"Anymore"
3.	"Hypocrite (Another World)"
4.	"Here and Somewhere Else"
5.	"Losing End of Distance"
6.	"Pioneer Square 2012"
7.	"Sea of Broken Hearts"
8.	"The Birds of Paradise"
9.	"Little People"
10.	"Going Through Changes"
11.	"Any Other Day"
12.	"St. Mary's Bell"
