= Steve Remote =

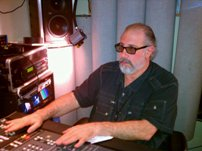

Background information
- Born
- Origin: Queens, New York, United States
- Occupations: Audio engineer, mixing engineer, record producer
- Years active: 1976–2026

Steve Remote was an American audio engineer, mixing engineer, record producer, recording studio designer and owner from Queens, New York, United States. He is the founder and chief engineer of Aura Sonic, a mobile and location production company in New York. He has worked on 17 Grammy Award nominated albums, three of which have won. For multiple years, he led the archival recording team at the Newport Folk and Newport Jazz Festivals. He passed at his home in New York in September 2026.

== Early years ==
In 1976, Remote began his music career in New York City’s nightclub scene, recording live acts at clubs including Max's Kansas City, CBGB and Irving Plaza among others. Bands he recorded include Blondie, Cherry Vanilla, John Collins Band, Johnny Thunders and The Heartbreakers, Klaus Nomi, Mink DeVille, New Wave Vaudeville, New York Dolls, Suicide, The Cramps, The Fast, The Ramones, The Voidoids, and Wayne County.

== Aura Sonic ==
In 1977, Remote established Aura Sonic to handle a variety of his recording duties: live albums, live television and radio broadcasts, and film and video concert remotes. Not content with operating a conventional recording studio, he decided to create a studio on wheels so he could go to the client instead of the client going to him. Most of what he learned about audio did not come through formal training but through hands on experience.

Selected artists recorded, engineered, mixed and/or produced by Remote include Aerosmith, Allman Brothers Band, Beck, The Beach Boys, The Black Crowes, Blink 182, Bon Jovi, Bruce Springsteen, Carlos Santana, Chick Corea, Coldplay, Donald Harrison with Ron Carter & Billy Cobham, Eddie Palmieri, Frank Zappa, Green Day, Hall & Oates, Herbie Hancock, James Blunt, Jane’s Addiction, Jeff Buckley, Jim James, Joshua Redman Quartet, Lenny Kravitz, Marcus Miller, Radiohead, Red Hot Chili Peppers, Stevie Wonder, Stone Temple Pilots, The Avett Brothers, The Police, Trombone Shorty and Orleans Avenue and Wayne Shorter.

== Selected live broadcast credits ==
- Newport Folk Festival (2008–present)
- Newport Jazz Festival (2008–present)
- Crosby & Nash - Crosby-Nash Live (2011)
- J&R Downtown Music Festival (2003-2008)
- NPR’s Toast of the Nation (2003-2007)
- Good Morning America (1998-2004)
- 1997 US Open Tennis Championships
- Red Hot Chili Peppers - Live from the Roseland Ballroom (prerecorded) (1991)
- The Day of 5 Billion (prerecorded) (1988)
- Frank Zappa - Halloween Live at the Palladium (1981)

== Selected album credits ==
- Lee Konitz, Bill Frisell - Enfants Terribles: Live at the Blue Note (2012)
- Stephen Lynch - Lion (2012)
- Jeff Buckley - Original Album Classics: The Grace EPs (2011)
- Kenny Werner - Peace (2004), Balloons: Live at the Blue Note (2011)
- New York Dolls - Live at the Fillmore East (2008), Live from the Bowery (2011)
- The Brian Setzer Orchestra - Christmas Comes Alive! (2010)
- Conrad Herwig - The Latin Side of Herbie Hancock (2010)
- McCoy Tyner - Solo: Live from San Francisco (2009)
- Gil Goldstein - Under Rousseau's Moon (2006)
- Arturo Sandoval - Live at the Blue Note (2005)
- Rob Thomas - Something to Be (2005)
- Elvin Jones - The Truth: Heard Live at the Blue Note (2004)
- Conrad Herwig - Another Kind of Blue: The Latin Side of Miles Davis (2004)
- Ben E. King - Shades of Blue (1999), Person To Person: Live At The Blue Note (2003)
- Laura Nyro - Live! The Looms Desire (2002)
- Paquito D’Rivera - Live at the Blue Note (2000)
- Will Calhoun - Live at the Blue Note (2000)
- Joe Jackson - Summer in the City: Live in New York (2000)
- Life of Agony - Unplugged at the Lowlands Festival '97 (2000)
- Machine Head - From This Day EP (2000)
- David Morgan - Live at the Blue Note (1999)
- Irvin Mayfield - Live at the Blue Note (1999)
- Slipknot - Slipnot (1999)
- Daryl Hall & John Oates - Marigold Sky (1997)
- Sepultura - Chaos A.D. (1993), Blood Rooted (1997)
- Denis Leary - No Cure for Cancer (1993), Lock 'n Load (1997)
- Lenny Kravitz - Let Love Rule (1989)
- Cro-Mags - Age of Quarrel (1986)
- Gil Evans & the Monday Night Orchestra - Bud and Bird (1986)

== Awards and accolades ==
- Facility provider and second engineer for Grammy Award winning album in the category of Best Jazz Large Ensemble Album in 2011; Mingus Big Band Live at Jazz Standard.
- Recording engineer and mixer for Latin Grammy Award winning album in the category of Best Latin Jazz Album in 2001; Paquito D'Rivera Quintet - Live at the Blue Note
- Facility provider and second engineer for Grammy Award winning album in the category of Best Jazz Instrumental Performance, Big Band in 1989; Gil Evans and the Monday Night Orchestra – Bud and Bird
- TEC Award winner in the category of Remote Production / Recording or Broadcast in 2009; JVC Newport Jazz Festival.
- TEC Award nominee in 1987, 1991, 2000, 2002, 2013
