= The Samples (album) =

1989 debut album by the Samples

Studio album by the Samples
- Released: 1989
- Genres: Pop rock, reggae
- Labels: Arista, What Are Records?
- Producer: Walt Beery

The Samples chronology
The Samples (1989)	Underwater People (1991)

The Samples is the debut album by the Samples. Produced by Walt Beery, the album was initially recorded and released independently, but was later released on Arista Records in May 1989, and rereleased in 1993 on What Are Records?. It was recorded for around $5,000.

== Critical reception ==
Professional ratings
Review scores
Source	Rating
AllMusic	4/5 stars

Trouser Press stated that the album "is filled with gentle, pleasant melodies that make the most of Kelly's vocals, his harmonies with bassist Andy Sheldon and the ringing interplay of Kelly's lead guitar with Charles Hambleton's acoustic guitar, mandolin and banjo."

== Track listing ==
All songs written by Sean Kelly, except where noted.

1. "Feel Us Shaking" (Kelly, Andy Sheldon, Al Laughlin, Jeep MacNichol) – 4:40
2. "Waited Up" (Kelly, Laughlin) – 5:12
3. "Ocean of War" – 5:01
4. "Could It Be Another Change" – 3:28
5. "Close to the Fires" – 4:33
6. "African Ivory" – 5:24
7. "My Town" (Kelly, Laughlin) – 2:57
8. "Birth of Words" – 4:41
9. "After the Rain" – 3:58
10. "Nature" (Kelly, Sheldon, Laughlin, MacNichol) – 5:37

== Personnel ==
- Sean Kelly (Lead singer, guitars)
- Andy Sheldon (Bass, vocals)
- Al Laughlin (Keyboards, vocals)
- Jeep MacNichol (Drums, percussion)
- Charles Hambleton (Guitars, mandolin)
