= The Bitter End =

New York coffeehouse and music venue

Coordinates: 40.7283°N 73.9992°W

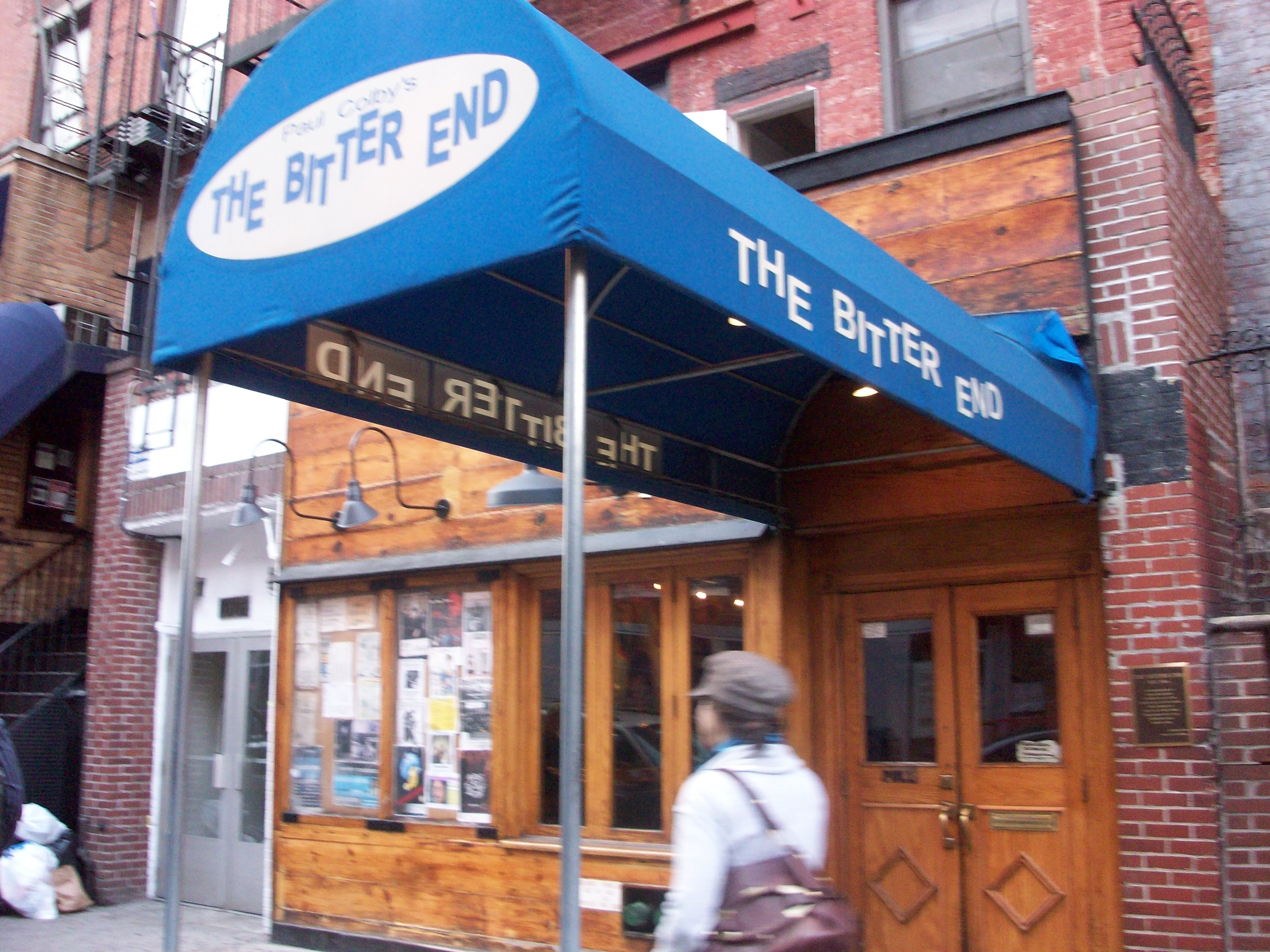
- The Bitter End, 2007
- Interactive map of The Bitter End
- Location: New York City, Greenwich Village, New York, U.S.
- Type: Nightclub, coffeehouse

Construction
- Opened: 1961

Website
- thebitterend.com

The Bitter End is a 230-person capacity nightclub, coffeehouse and folk music venue in New York City's Greenwich Village. It opened in 1961 at 147 Bleecker Street under the auspices of owner Fred Weintraub. The club changed its name to The Other End in June 1975. However, after a few years the owners changed the club's name back to the more recognizable The Bitter End. It remains open under new ownership.

== History ==
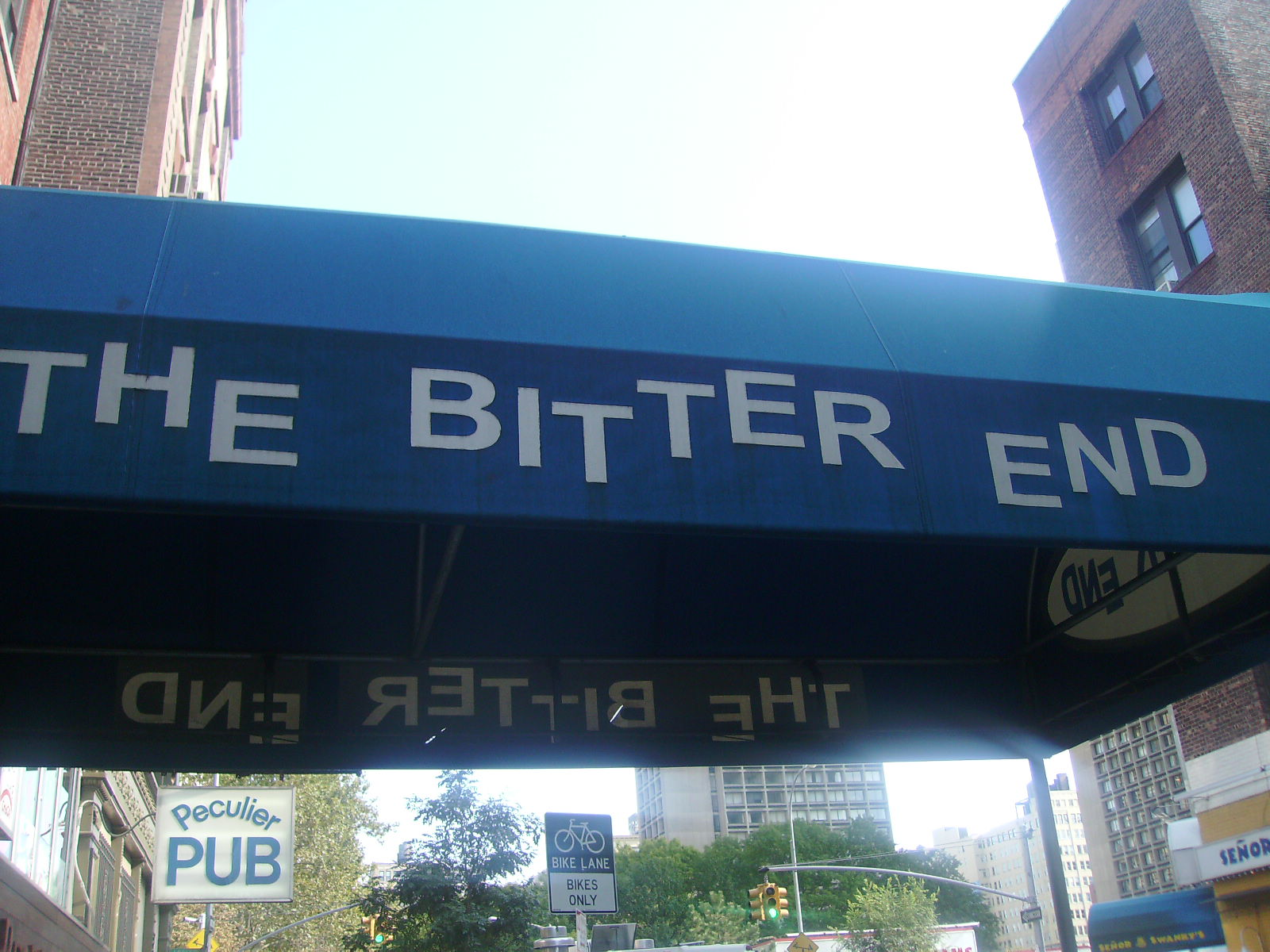
The awning at The Bitter End in October 2008

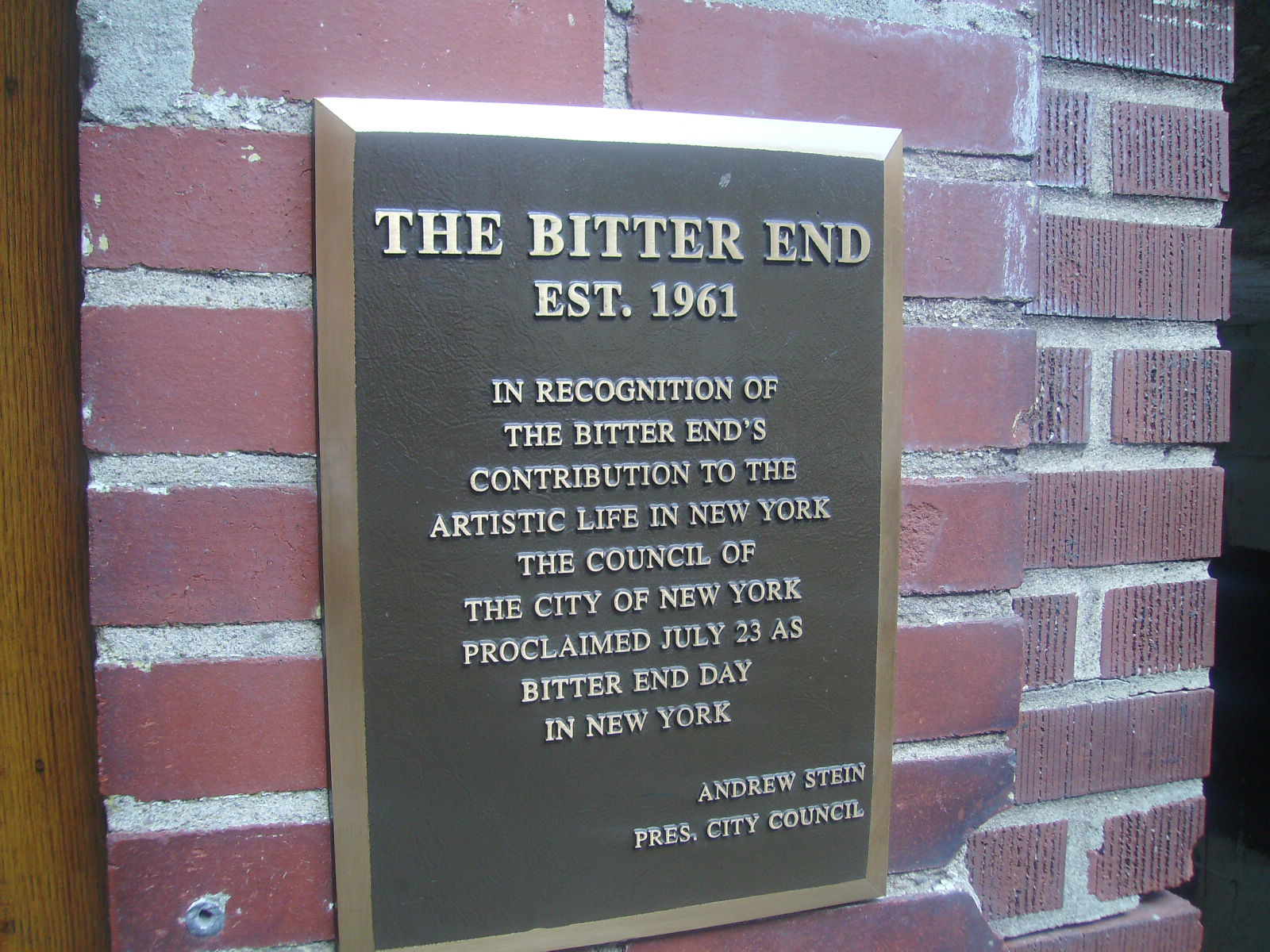
New York City Landmark status granted to The Bitter End in 1992

An earlier club, The Cock and Bull, operated on the same premises with the same format, in the late 1950s. The poet and comedian Hugh Romney, who later became known as Wavy Gravy, read there.

The Bitter End was originally a coffeeshop. According to The New York Times, "The Bitter End, which opened in 1961, considers itself to be New York’s oldest rock club and built a legendary reputation after showcasing young performers like Joni Mitchell and James Taylor and comedians like Woody Allen and Billy Crystal." At the club, Bob Dylan played pool, watched performances, and occasionally performed circa 1961.

During the early 1960s, the club hosted folk music "hootenannies" every Tuesday night, featuring many performers who have since become legendary. During its heyday The Bitter End showcased a wide range of talented and legendary musicians, comedians, and theatrical performers.

In 1968, Paul Colby (1917–2014), who began his career as a song plugger for Benny Goodman’s publishing company, and went on to work for Frank Sinatra, Duke Ellington, and Guy Lombardo, became the manager and booking agent at The Bitter End, and in 1974 he purchased it. Owner Paul Colby died in 2014. He had two partners in the club, Paul Rizzo and Ken Gorka. A tribute concert was held for Colby after his death. Kenny Gorka died in 2015. Gorka was an original member of New Jersey band The Critters.

According to Colby, James Taylor bombed when he played the club in 1969, and Neil Young also bombed at the club. In the mid 1970s, the club became known as the birthplace of Bob Dylan's Rolling Thunder Revue, which featured such names as Joni Mitchell, Roger McGuinn, Ramblin' Jack Elliot, Joan Baez, T-Bone Burnett, Ronee Blakely, Mick Ronson, and many other guest stars.

The Bitter End was granted landmark status by the city of New York in 1992. Also in 1992, the venue's landlord tried to evict the bar, with the venue saved by benefit performances by Peter, Paul, and Mary, Kris Kristofferson, George Carlin and others.

Lady Gaga performed at the bar in October 2016, after previously performing there as an unsigned act, before the release of her debut album. The performance was part of Gaga's Dive Bar Tour.

Will Wood performed a live set for his movie and live album Slouching Towards Branson. This was set as the opening to the movie, and it was part of a greater tour in the USA named Slouching Towards Bethlehem in 2024.

== Live albums recorded ==
Numerous musical albums have been recorded at The Bitter End/The Other End, including albums by Biff Rose ("Half-live at the Bitter End"), Peter, Paul and Mary, Randy Newman, Curtis Mayfield, Donny Hathaway, Arlo Guthrie, Pete Seeger, Tom Paxton, The Isley Brothers and Tommy James & the Shondells, The Chad Mitchell Trio, Country Joe McDonald and Bill Haley & His Comets. Comedy albums recorded there include Bill Cosby's first album, Bill Cosby Is a Very Funny Fellow...Right!, and comedian Chris Rush's second album, Beaming In.

== See also ==
- Cafe Wha?
- Cafe Au Go Go
- The Gaslight Cafe
- Gerde's Folk City
- Filmore East
