= Autopilot (album) =

Studio album by the Samples
- Released: 1994
- Genre: Alternative rock
- Label: What Are Records?
- Producer: Walt Beery

The Samples chronology
| The Last Drag (1993) | Autopilot (1994) | Outpost (1996) |

Autopilot is the fourth studio album by Boulder, Colorado, band the Samples, released in 1994.

== Production ==
The album was recorded in Boulder, and mixed, in part, at Pinnacle Studios, in Orem, Utah.

== Critical reception ==
Professional ratings
Review scores
| Source | Rating |
|---|---|
| AllMusic | 2/5 stars |
| The Encyclopedia of Popular Music | 4/5 stars |
| MusicHound Rock: The Essential Album Guide | 3/5 stars |

Trouser Press wrote that "even four albums on, there’s still that Sting/Police thing: 'Dinosaur Bones' could have appeared on Synchronicity, while 'As Tears Fall' sounds like a slowed-down version of 'If You Love Somebody Set Them Free.'"

== Track listing ==
All songs written by Sean Kelly, except where noted.

1. "As Tears Fall"
2. "Madmen"
3. "Weight of the World"
4. "Water Rush" (Jeep MacNichol)
5. "Only to You" (Andy Sheldon)
6. "Seasons in the City" (Kelly, Al Laughlin)
7. "The Hunt" (Andy Sheldon)
8. "Finest Role"
9. "Who Am I?"
10. "Dinosaur Bones"
11. "Buffalo Herds & Windmills"

== Personnel ==
- Sean Kelly: Vocals, acoustic and electric guitars
- Andy Sheldon: Bass, vocals
- Al Laughlin: Keyboards
- Boyd Tinsley: Violin
- Jeep MacNichol: Drums, percussion, drum programming
