= Beaming In =

Live album by Chris Rush
- Released: 1981
- Venue: The Other End
- Studio: The Hit Factory
- Genre: Comedy
- Length: 50:33
- Label: City Sounds (original release); Laugh.com (re-release)
- Producer: Allan Landon

Chris Rush chronology
First Rush (1973)	Beaming In (1981)	There's No Bones in Ice Cream (1997)

Beaming In is the second album by American comedian Chris Rush. It was recorded during a week of shows in 1979 at The Other End, NYC. The album was released in 1981 on City Sounds, which is a subsidiary of MMO Music Group Inc. 25 years after the initial release it was re-released through the online record label, Laugh, onto CD and digital download.

== Track listing ==
=== Side one ===
1. Mutant Blues
2. End of the World Funnies
3. The Missile Silo (The Missile Silo) (1984)
4. Fun City
5. Bambi Basher
6. Grass (Too High) (Reefer Madness) (Good Ship Lollipop) (Sucking The Bosco Pump)
7. Beaming In
8. Aliens (Exchange Student From Alpha Centauri) (Close Encounters) (Pet Human)
9. Chariot of the Gods

=== Side two ===
1. Sky Lab
2. Farts in Space
3. Son of Future Shock
4. Test Tube Baby
5. Computer Bummer
6. Monkey Party
7. Dolphins
8. Cave Man Love
9. Amityville Horror
10. Bermuda Triangle
11. 10,000 Lb. Goober
12. Star Trek II
13. Living Together

== Personnel ==
- Steve Prinias – Engineer
- Malcome Addey – Engineering consultant
- Joe Barbaria – Mix engineer, editing engineer
- David Prentice – Editing engineer
- Jeff Schwartz – Personal management, Production manager
- Michael Sullivan – Cover art
- Hal Wilson – Art direction
- Peter Bramley – Special thanks
- Marlene Hollick – Special thanks
- Howard Leibowitz – Special thanks
- Jamie Rich – Special thanks
- Michael Shevlin – Special thanks
- Alan Siegel – Special thanks
- Aura-Sonic Ltd. – Location recording
