= No Room =

Studio album by the Samples
- Released: 1992
- Recorded: 1991
- Genre: Rock
- Label: What Are Records?
- Producer: Jim Scott

The Samples chronology
Underwater People (1991)	No Room (1992)	The Last Drag (1993)

No Room is the second studio album by the Boulder, Colorado-based rock band the Samples, released in 1992. Prior to recording the album, the band left Arista Records to regain control of their musical direction.

The Samples supported the album with a North American tour; they also played the 1993 H.O.R.D.E. festival. They wrote and tested the songs while touring their previous album. No Room sold almost 80,000 copies in its first nine months of release; it had topped more than 150,000 copies by 1998.

== Critical reception ==
Professional ratings
Review scores
Source	Rating
AllMusic	2/5 stars
Chicago Tribune	3.5/4 stars

The Chicago Tribune noted the "crystalline production, bubbling keyboard arrangements, snaky guitar lines and a tight, syncopated rhythm section." The Daily Breeze deemed the album "rock with a point—and with touches of jazz fusion, ska, reggae and even a country twang."

Mentioning the Samples' return to an independent label, the Tulsa World opined that "the band's loyalty to its formative ideas gives its music a consistent, yet broad-based, signature." Trouser Press wrote: "'When It's Raining' is a standout, a shimmering melody surfing on a wiggly groove, finally capturing in the studio some of what the Samples transmit onstage."

== Track listing ==
All songs written by Sean Kelly, except where noted.

1. "When It's Raining" – 3:33
2. "Summertime" (Kelly, Al Laughlin) – 4:57
3. "Another Disaster" (Kelly, Andy Sheldon) – 5:15
4. "Did You Ever Look So Nice" (Kelly, Laughlin) – 4:02
5. "Nothing Lasts for Long" – 4:35
6. "Stone Tears" (Sheldon) – 4:43
7. "Giants" (Sheldon) – 3:20
8. "Suburbia" (Kelly, MacNichol) – 4:49
9. "14th and Euclid" (Kelly, Laughlin) – 4:16
10. "Won't Be Back Again" (Kelly, Laughlin) – 2:40
11. "Pain" – 3:57
12. "Little Whale" (Vince Sendra) – :56
13. "Seany Boy (Drop Out)" – 2:39
14. "Taking Us Home" – 4:03
15. "When It's Raining - Live" (hidden track)

== Personnel ==
- Sean Kelly – lead vocals, guitars
- Andy Sheldon – bass, vocals
- Al Laughlin – keyboards, vocals
- Jeep MacNichol – drums/percussion, vocals
