= The Last Drag =

Studio album by the Samples
- Released: 1993
- Genre: Alternative rock
- Label: What Are Records?
- Producer: Marc DeSisto

The Samples chronology
| No Room (1992) | The Last Drag (1993) | Autopilot (1994) |

The Last Drag is the third studio album by the Samples. It was released in 1993.

== Critical reception ==
Professional ratings
Review scores
| Source | Rating |
|---|---|
| AllMusic | 3/5 stars |

The Washington Post wrote that "the arrangements often possess a haunting guitar-woven beauty or nervous rhythmic energy that plays tricks with time, making the hour-long disc appear half as long." MusicHound Rock: The Essential Album Guide, however, panned the album, listing it as one to avoid.

== Track listing ==
All songs written by Sean Kelly, except where noted.

1. "Little Silver Ring"
2. "Everytime"
3. "Still Water"
4. "Eatonville" (Andy Sheldon)
5. "Streets in the Rain"
6. "When the Day Is Done"
7. "Taxi" (Kelly, Al Laughlin)
8. "Carry On"
9. "Conquistador" (Sheldon)
10. "Misery" (Jeep MacNichol)
11. "The Last Drag"
12. "Darkside"
13. "Nitrous Fall" (Sheldon)
14. "Prophet of Doom" (Sheldon)
15. "Playground" (Laughlin)
16. "Smile for the Camera"

== Personnel ==
- Sean Kelly (Lead Singer, Acoustic/Electric Guitars)
- Andy Sheldon (Bass, Vocals)
- Al Laughlin (Keyboards, Piano, Organ, Vocals)
- Jeep MacNichol (Drums/Percussion, Programming, Vocals)
