= Aura Sonic =

Remote recording services company based in New York City

Aura-Sonic, Ltd.
- Type: Remote Recording
- Industry: Entertainment, Broadcasting, Remote Recording, Recording Studio
- Founded: 1977
- Founder: Steve Remote; Joel Schreiber
- Headquarters: Queens, New York, United States
- Key people: Steve Remote, Chief Engineer
- Owner: Steve Remote
- Website: aurasonicltd.com

Aura-Sonic, Ltd. (ASL) is a remote recording company based in Queens, New York, that specializes in mobile and location production, audio for video broadcasting, video production, sound reinforcement and on-site automated dialogue replacement. ASL was founded in 1977 by recording engineer and producer Steve Remote. The company owns and utilizes a fleet of adaptable mobile vehicles and portable packages for its audio/production projects.

== History ==
In 1977, recording engineer Steve Remote partnered with Joel Schreiber to create Aura-Sonic, Ltd. Remote had been recording professionally at Max's Kansas City since 1976 while Schreiber, a graduate from the American Academy of the Dramatic Arts, was managing a children's clothing store in Flushing, Queens. Not content with operating a conventional recording studio, Steve decided to create a studio on wheels so they could go the client instead of the client going to them. From 1977 to 1983, Schreiber was the President of ASL with Remote acting as the Vice President and chief engineer. In 1983, Remote bought out Schreiber's stake in the company and became the sole owner.

== Artists ==
A company "in the forefront of mobile audio", ASL has worked with many artists including Aerosmith, Alabama Shakes, Alicia Keys, Allman Brothers Band, Bruce Springsteen, B-52's, Beck, Ben Harper, Bill Burr, Bill Frisell, Blink 182, Bon Jovi, Brandi Carlile, Branford Marsalis, Brittany Howard, Carlos Santana, Chick Corea, Coldplay, Counting Crows, Cro-Mags - Age of Quarrel, Crosby & Nash, Daryl Hall & Darius Rucker, Dave Brubeck, Dave Mathews & Tim Reynolds, Dawes, Denis Leary, Dolly Parton, Donald Harrison with Ron Carter & Billy Cobham, Eddie Palmieri, Elvin Jones, Elvis Costello, Esperanza Spalding, Frank Zappa, George Benson, Gil Evans & the Monday Night Orchestra, Green Day, Hall & Oates, Harry Connick Jr., Herbie Hancock, Hozier, Interpol, James Brown, James Blunt, James Taylor, Jeff Buckley, Jeff Tweedy, Jennifer Nettles, Jim James, Jimmy Eat World, Joe Jackson, Jon Batiste, John Hiatt, John Prine, Josh Groban, Joshua Redman Quartet, Kacey Musgraves, Kenny G, Lake Street Dive, Lee Konitz, Lenny Kravitz, Lucius, Lukas Nelson & Promise of the Real, Machine Head, Maggie Rogers, Marilyn Manson, Margo Price, Mavis Staples, McCoy Tyner, Mighty Mighty Bosstones, Morrissey, My Morning Jacket, Nathaniel Rateliff & The Night Sweats, Neil Young & Promise of the Real, Neville Brothers, Norah Jones, Odean Pope, Paquito D’Rivera, Puss N Boots, Queens of the Stone Age, Radiohead, Red Hot Chili Peppers, Rob Thomas, Rod Steward, Roger Daltrey, Roger Waters, Ryan Adams, Sepultura, Sheryl Crow, Skid Row w/ Rob Halford, Slipknot, Sonic Youth, Soundgarden, Spyro Gyra, Stevie Wonder, Stone Temple Pilots, Sturgill Simpson, Talking Heads, The Avett Brothers, The Beach Boys, The Black Crowes, The Brian Setzer Orchestra, The Highwomen, The Police, The Roots, UB40, Van Dyke Parks, Warren Haynes, Wayne Shorter, Wilco, Wynton Marsalis, XTC, and Yo Yo Ma.

== Mobile Units ==
=== The Bunker (1977-1984) ===
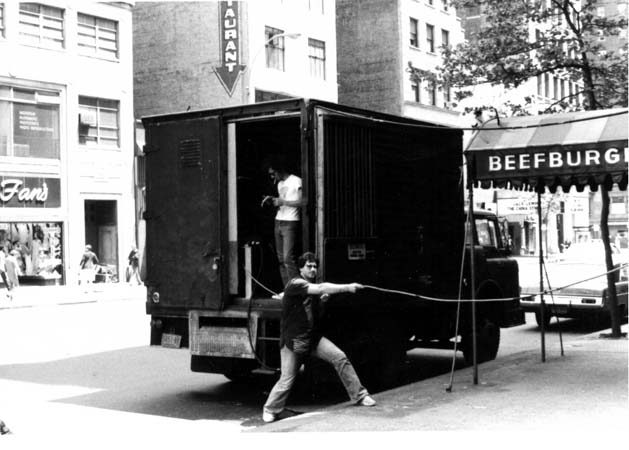
Steve Remote and the Bunker, NYC

==== Specifications ====
1966 Ford 600 Series
12’ X 7 ‘ X 7’ (body) control cabin
Gross Vehicle Weight: 14,000 lbs
Rear and Passenger side exits

==== Select Acts Recorded ====
Artists include Black Uhuru, Chris Rush, Elvin Jones, Frank Zappa (Halloween ‘81), Howard Jones, Johnny Thunders, Jerry Lee Lewis, Sam and Dave, The Buzzcocks, The Police, The Ramones, The Specials, and XTC.

=== GMC (1984 - 1987) ===
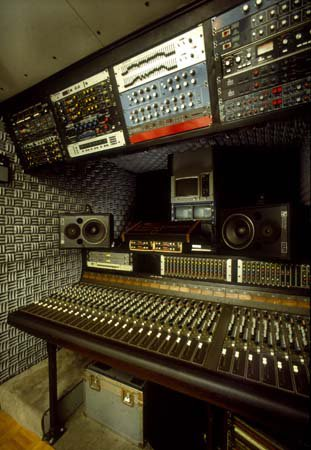
The inside of ASL's second remote truck

==== Specifications ====
GMC Chevrolet
Gross Vehicle Weight: 18,000 lbs
Power Requirements & information: 208 volts, single-phase, 50 amp service required
Passenger side exit

==== Select Acts Recorded ====
Artists include Allen Toussaint, Bad Brains, Bobby Hutcherson, Boy George, Dr. John, Gill Evans and the Monday Night Orchestra, Lloyd Cole & the Commotions, Ron Carter, Rev. Timothy Wright, Randy Brecker, Sadao Watanabe, The Duke Ellington Orchestra, The Fleshtones, and The Neville Brothers.

=== Jethro (1987 – 2009) ===
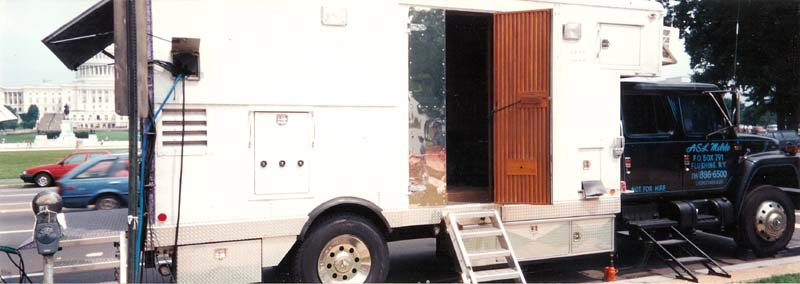
Jethro in front of the Capital in Washington, D.C.

==== Specifications ====
Navistar International turbocharged Diesel truck
Gross Vehicle Weight: 33,000 lbs
Outside truck dimensions: 30' 6" long X 8' 0" wide X 11' 6" high
Control cabin dimensions: 17' 0" long X 7' 5" wide X 7' 10" high
Power Requirements & information: 208 volts, single-phase, 50 amp service required
Passenger side exit

==== Select Acts Recorded ====
Artists include 24-7 Spyz, Aerosmith, Allman Brothers Band, Ben Harper, Branford Marsalis, Carlos Santana, David Matthews and Friends, Denis Leary, Elliott Smith, Jeff Buckley, Laura Nyro, Lenny Kravitz, Living Colour, Outkast, Pat Benatar, Public Enemy, Roberta Flack, Red Hot Chili Peppers, Sonic Youth, Soundgarden, The Beach Boys, and Tony Bennett.

=== Elroy (1999 – Present) ===
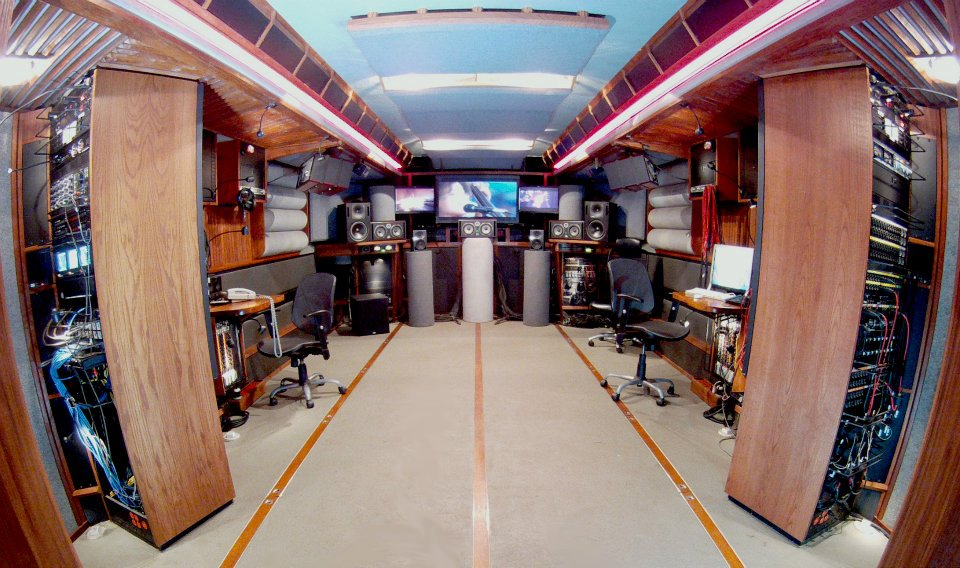
The inside of Elroy

==== Specifications ====
Mercedes-Benz 1419
Gross Vehicle Weight: 33,000 lbs
Exterior Vehicle Dimensions: 33.0' L x 12.5' H x 102" W
Exterior Dimensions with Rear Platform & Stairs: 40.0' L x 12.5' H x 102" W
Exterior Expando Dimensions: 22.0' L x 11.5' H x 14.0' W
Power Requirements & information: 208 volts, single-phase, 100 amp service required
Elroy carries 200' of entertainment power cable with Cam-Lok E1016 connectors
Rear side exit

==== Select Acts Recorded/Mixed ====
Artists include Anat Cohen, Anthony Hamilton, Aretha Franklin, Chris Botti, Dave Holland, Esperanza Spalding, Herbie Hancock, Hey Guy, Hunters, Kenny Werner, Ledici, Los Gauchos, New York Dolls, Soulive and Wayne Shorter.

=== The Bread Mobile (2003 – Present) ===
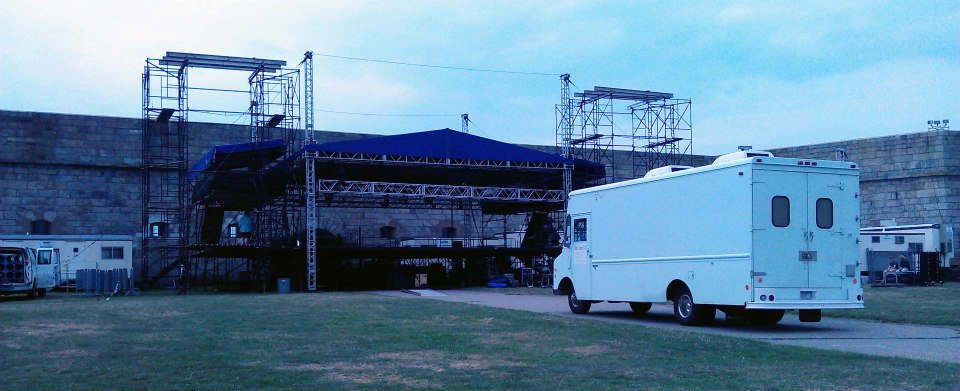
The Bread Mobile at the 2012 Newport Folk Festival

==== Specifications ====
GMC / Grumman Kurbmaster Stepvan
Gross Vehicle Weight: 14,000 lbs
Exterior Vehicle Dimensions: 25.5' L x 11.5' H x 96" W
Power Requirements & information: 208 volts, single-phase, 50 amp service required
TBM carries 200' of entertainment power cable with Cam-Lok E1016 & E1015 connectors
Passenger side exit

==== Select Live Broadcasts ====
- NPR’s Toast of the Nation (2003-2007)
- J&R Downtown Music Festival (2003-2008)
- 88th PGA Tour (2006)
- Newport Folk Festival (2008-Present)
- Newport Jazz Festival (2008-Present)

==== Select Acts Recorded ====
Artists include Alabama Shakes, Andrew Bird, Beck, Conor Oberst, Conrad Herwig, Dawes, Eddie Palmieri, Elvis Costello, Fleet Foxes, Herbie Hancock, Jim James, Joshua Redman Quartet, Marcus Miller, Michael Kiwanuka, My Morning Jacket, Patty Griffin, The Avett Brothers, The Decemberists, The Lumineers, Trombone Shorty and Orleans Avenue, Wayne Shorter Quartet, Wilco and Wynton Marsalis.

=== Cosmo (2009 - Present) ===
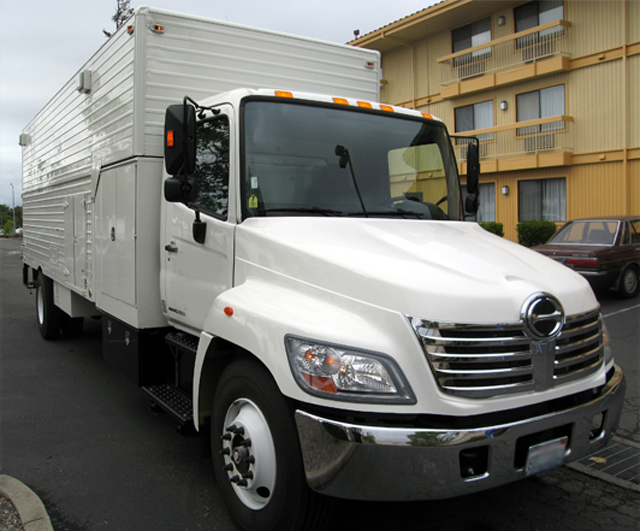
Cosmo

==== Specifications ====
Hino 268 A
Gross Vehicle Weight: 25,950 lbs
Exterior Vehicle Dimensions: 36.0' L x 11.5' H x 102" W
Exterior Dimensions with Rear Platform & Stairs: 40.0' L x 11.5' H x 102" W
Power Requirements & information: 208 volts, single-phase, 100 amp service required
Cosmo carries 200' of entertainment power cable with Cam-Lok E1016 connectors
Rear side exit

=== Tiny Big Mobile (2016 – Present) ===
==== Specifications ====
2015 Ford Transit / 350 HD Ecoboost
Gross Vehicle Weight: 5,878 lbs
Exterior Vehicle Dimensions: 22' L x 9.6' H x 86" W
Power Requirements & information: 208 volts, single-phase, 50 amp service required
TBM II carries 90' of entertainment power cable with Cam-Lok E1016 & E1015 connectors
Passenger side exit

==== Select Live Broadcasts ====
- WPLJ-FM Summer Kick-Off Broadcast (2016)
- WPLJ-FM Holiday Broadcast from Children's Specialized Hospital (2016)
- Newport Folk Festivals (2017 & 2018)
- Farm Aid Live Television Broadcast (2018)
- Live X The Greatest Day Ever Fest - Coney Island - Live Broadcast (2019)

==== Select Acts Recorded or Mixed ====
Artists include Bon Iver, Brandi Carlile, Dave Matthews & Tim Reynolds, Devon Gilfillian, Drive-By Truckers, Fleet Foxes, Harry Connick Jr., Hurray for the Riff Raff, Jade Bird, Jason Isbell, Jim James, John Paul White, John Prine, Jon Batiste, Jonathan Wilson, Kermit the Frog, Lake Street Dive, Lucius, Lukas Nelson, Margo Price, Marlon Williams, Nathaniel Rateliff, Nathaniel Rateliff and the Night Sweats, Neil Young & Promise of the Real, Pinegrove, Sturgill Simpson, The War and Treaty, The Wild Reeds, Roger Waters, Shovels & Rope, Warren Haynes, Wilco, and Yebba.

== Awards and Accolades ==
- Remote Recording Facility for Grammy Award winning album in the category of Best Jazz Large Ensemble Album in 2011; Mingus Big Band Live at Jazz Standard.
- TEC Award winner in the category of Remote Production / Recording or Broadcast in 2009; JVC Newport Jazz Festival
- Remote Recording Facility for Grammy Award winning album in the category of Best Latin Jazz Album in 2001; Paquito D'Rivera Quintet - Live at the Blue Note
- Remote Recording Facility for Grammy Award winning album in the category of Best Jazz Instrumental Performance, Big Band in 1989; Gil Evans and the Monday Night Orchestra – Bud and Bird
- Nominee 1987, 1991, 2002, 2013 TEC Award Remote Recording Facility
