= Underwater People =

The Samples

Compilation album by the Samples
- Released: 1991
- Genre: Jam rock, reggae, jazz fusion
- Label: What are Records
- Producer: Jim Scott

The Samples chronology
The Samples (1989)	The Samples (1991)	No Room (1992)

Professional ratings
Review scores
Source	Rating
AllMusic	4.5/5 stars
MusicHound Rock: The Essential Album Guide	4/5 stars

Underwater People is the second album by the Samples. It contained live material, demos, unreleased songs, and alternate versions. It was released on November 30, 1991, and re-released by What Are Records? in 1992.

== Critical reception ==
MusicHound Rock: The Essential Album Guide called the album the band's best, writing that it "rises above the rest with lots of energetic reggae rhythms and more consistent songwriting."

== Track listing ==
1. Underwater People (Live)
2. My Town (Meltdown) (Live)
3. Braidwood
4. Giants (Live)
5. After the Rain (Live)
6. Moonlit Treese (1987)
7. Overthrow (Live)
8. Feel us Shaking (Acoustic)

== Lineup ==
- Sean Kelly (Lead Singer, Guitars)
- Andy Sheldon (Bass, Vocals)
- Al Laughlin (Keyboards, Vocals)
- Jeep MacNichol (Drums/Percussion)
- Charles Hambleton (Acoustic Guitar)
- Chat Charbuck (Congas on "Moonlit Treese")
- Branford Marsalis (Sax on "Giants")
