= 3 Balloons =

Studio album by Stephen Lynch
- Released: 24 March 2009
- Genre: Comedy
- Length: 39:23
- Label: HaHa/What Are Records?

Stephen Lynch chronology
Cleanest Hits (2006)	3 Balloons (2009)	Lion (2012)

Professional ratings
Review scores
Source	Rating
Allmusic	3.5/5 stars

3 Balloons is an album by comedian/musician Stephen Lynch. According to his official website, it was first studio album since 2000's A Little Bit Special. As of 5 March 2009, it is available for purchase in MP3 format directly from WhatAreRecords.com. It was made available from other on-line stores starting the following week of March 2009. CDs were made available for sale at shows and on-line shortly after that, and it was released in stores starting 24 March. On the week ending April 11, 2009, the album debuted and peaked at #152 on the Billboard 200.

On his official site, Lynch says:

"My last two albums were recorded live in concert, just guitar and voice, and I wanted to do something different this time. Whenever I write or perform a new song, in my head I hear pianos and drums and tubas and string sections and jug bands and children's choirs. I want you to hear those things too. Except we couldn't find a children's choir whose parents would let them sing about drug mules and transsexual prostitutes. Maybe next time."

— Stephen Lynch, Official Website

Most professional news sources did not review the album, with the notable exception of Allmusic's positive review, stating: "Love him or hate him — and that really does seem all there is to choose from — 3 Balloons finds novelty songster Stephen Lynch on a roll, keeping the quality high even when the formula is the same it has been for the past decade."

The album cover is a visual parody of the artwork design for the T. Rex album Electric Warrior.

== Track listing ==
All tracks are written by Stephen Lynch.

No.	Title	Length
1.	"Waiting"	3:57
2.	"Fishin' Hole"	3:54
3.	"Dear Diary 1"	0:47
4.	"Crazy Peanuts"	3:08
5.	"3 Balloons"	4:04
6.	"Dear Diary 2"	0:48
7.	"Medieval Bush"	2:38
8.	"A History Lesson"	2:32
9.	"Dear Diary 3"	0:48
10.	"You (Prettier Than)"	2:55
11.	"The Ballad of Scarface"	4:48
12.	"America"	3:24
13.	"Dear Diary 4"	0:48
14.	"Hallelujah"	4:44

== Personnel ==
- Stephen Lynch – acoustic guitar, vocals
- Dean Sharenow – drums
- Ivan Bodley – bass
- Rich Campbell – piano
- Erik Della Penna – electric guitar, cigar box guitars
- Jonathan Dinklage – violin, viola, string arrangements
- Dave Eggar – cello
- Rod Cone and David Josefsberg – additional vocals

== Charts ==
Chart (2009)	Peak position
US Billboard 200	152
