= Courtney Jaye =

American singer-songwriter

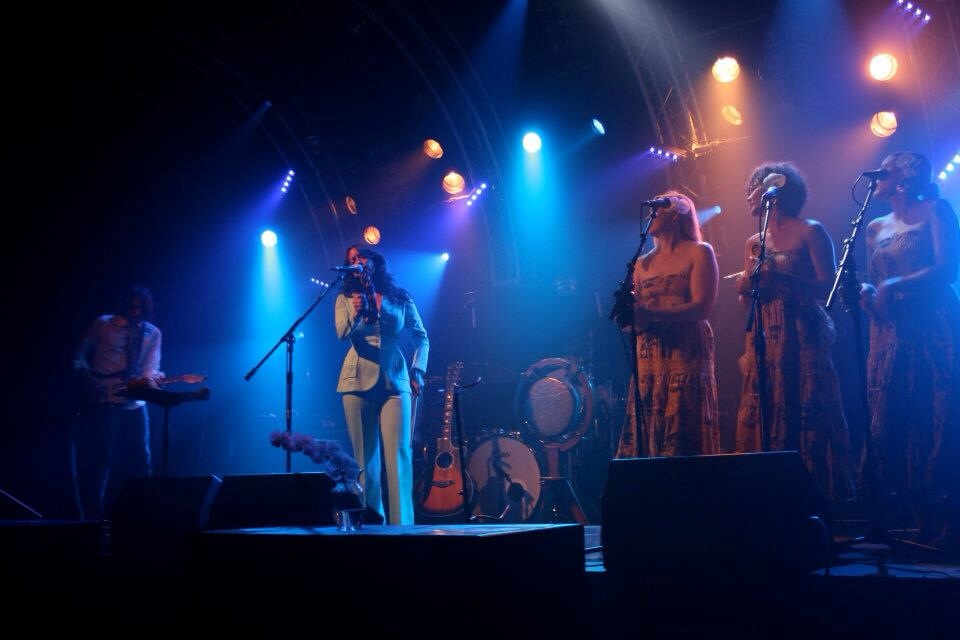

Background information
- Born: Courtney Jaye Goldberg; February 15, 1978 (age 48); Pittsburgh, Pennsylvania, U.S.
- Origin: Nashville, Tennessee, U.S.
- Genres: Indie
- Occupations: Singer, songwriter
- Years active: 2004–present

Courtney Jaye (born February 15, 1978) is an American singer and songwriter.

== Biography ==
Courtney Jaye Goldberg was born on February 15, 1978, in Pittsburgh, Pennsylvania, and moved to Alpharetta, Georgia, when she was a freshman in high school. It was at this time she discovered The Grateful Dead and Neil Young, and also began to play the guitar. After becoming immersed in the bohemian culture, she moved west and lived in the mountain town of Flagstaff, Arizona. She worked as an acupuncturist's assistant by day and performed in a bluegrass band at night.

She has lived on the Hawaiian island of Kauai as well as in music cities such as Austin, Los Angeles, and finally Nashville, Tennessee. Along the way, she signed her first record deal with Island Records in 2004 and released Traveling Light containing her first single "Can't Behave" in June 2005. She performed on The Tonight Show with Jay Leno and toured the country on a radio promotional tour. The album peaked at No. 22 on the Billboard Top Heatseekers on June 25, 2005.

Courtney has collaborated with many musicians over the years including Gary Louris of The Jayhawks, Matthew Sweet, Peter Hayes of BRMC, Kristen Hall, Rhett Miller, Tift Merritt, Taj Mahal, Thad Cockrell, Floating Action, Ben Bridwell of Band of Horses, Dallas Green, Emily Saliers of The Indigo Girls and Butch Walker.

On January 12, 2010, she released the independent album The Exotic Sounds of Courtney Jaye, which features the duet "Sometimes Always" with Ben Bridwell of Band of Horses. The album was released on Jaye's imprint Tropicali Records and was produced by Seth Kauffman (Floating Action), with additional production by Bill Reynolds (Band of Horses), and was mixed by Joe Pisapia.

In February 2011, she made an appearance in the video for Super Furry Animals' lead singer Gruff Rhys's song "Sensations in the Dark", from his album Hotel Shampoo, via Wichita Recordings. She was featured as a background vocalist on the Dan Auerbach–produced album from Ohio artist Brian Olive. The record was released on Alive Records, June 2011. In November 2012, she appeared as a featured guest/backing vocalist on comedy rocker Stephen Lynch's album Lion, produced by Doug Lancio (Patty Griffin).

In 2013, she released Love and Forgiveness, produced by CMA/Grammy Award-winning producer Mike Wrucke (Miranda Lambert "Revolution"). The album was tracked live in Los Angeles over the course of four days. In December 2013, Love and Forgiveness was recognized as one of the Top 50 Albums of 2013 by American Songwriter.

== Discography ==
- Traveling Light (Island, 2005)
- Til it Bleeds (Independent, 2006)
- Who'll Stop The Rain (AO Recordings, 2007)
- The Exotic Sounds of Courtney Jaye (Tropicali Records, 2010)
- Love and Forgiveness (2013)
- Hymns and Hallelucinations (Tropicali Records, 2022)

== Soundtracks ==
- Aquamarine OST, with "Can't Behave", 2006
- Laguna Beach: The Real Orange County episode 3.2: "Who Wants to Date a Rockstar", with "Mental"
- Laguna Beach: The Real Orange County episode 3.10: "It's, Like, Break-Up Season", with "Are You With Me"
- One Tree Hill episode 2.22: "The Tide That Left Away And Never Came Back", with "Can You Sleep"
- Brothers & Sisters episodes 2.01: "Home Front", 2.05: "Domestic Issues" and 2.11: "The Missionary Imposition", with "Who'll Stop The Rain"
- Brothers & Sisters episode 2.10: "The Feast of the Epiphany", with "Sweet Ride"
