= Le Concorde (band) =

American sophisti-pop band

- Origin: Chicago, U.S.; currently Los Angeles, U.S.
- Genres: Sophisti-pop, Indie pop
- Years active: 2004–present
- Labels: March Records; What Are Records? Le Grand Magistery
- Members: Stephen Becker
- Website: leconcordemusic.com

Le Concorde is a Los Angeles-based sophisti-pop musical project by singer, songwriter, and multi-instrumentalist Stephen Becker.

== History ==
Le Concorde's influences have included Prefab Sprout, Aztec Camera, Orchestral Manoeuvres in the Dark, The Blue Nile and The Psychedelic Furs. Their first album was a self-titled EP released in 2004. It includes a collaboration with the Psychedelic Furs guitarist, John Ashton, and their saxophone player, Mars Williams, on the track "The Sound of Your Name." The EP was produced by Ellis Clark and Ed Tinley and mastered by Emily Lazar at The Lodge, NYC. The EP received generally favorable reviews with AllMusic calling it "very pretty music".

After the release of the self-titled EP, the band was signed to March Records and released Universe and Villa in 2005. The album was produced and engineered by Ed Tinley and Ellis Clark, and included contributions from Kevin Tihista and Steve Gillis, formerly of Filter. Reviews for the album were generally positive, with PopMatters stating "There’s no denying that Becker knows his way around a pop tune, providing ample hooks and textures, filling every nook and cranny with some sort of flourish".

In 2007, the band signed with the record label Le Grand Magistery and released the EP, Suite. The EP was recorded in Los Angeles with producer David Gamson, in Chicago with producers Ed Tinley and Ellis Clark.

In 2010, the band released the full-length album House, the band's second release with Le Grand Magistery. The album saw the continued collaboration with producer David Gamson, as well as tracks produced by Chicago producer, Vince Lawrence. The album was mastered by Greg Calbi and Ron McMaster, with production collaboration continuing with Ed Tinley. The track "Sometimes It's Hard" appeared in the film Under the Silver Lake, starring Andrew Garfield.

=== Second Mansions ===
In early 2025, Le Concorde announced a forthcoming full-length album titled Second Mansions, and began releasing a series of digital-only singles from the album.

Released in February 2025, the first single, "Corpus Christi", was inspired by Blessed Carlo Acutis – a Catholic teenager from Italy who documented Eucharistic miracles on a website and online database before he died from leukemia at age 15 in 2006; his canonization for sainthood was announced by the Vatican in 2025. A tribute to Acutis's interest in computer programming and video games, the track's synth-pop aesthetic was accompanied by a pixel-art music video reminiscent of 1980s arcade games. The official music video was featured at the 2025 Golden Door Film Festival and was a finalist in the 2025 Rome Prisma Film Awards.

The second single, "Saint James", was released in July of 2025 on Kecharitomene, the band's own label. The song references the apostle, St. James the Greater and the pilgrimage known as The Way of St. James (Spanish: Camino de Santiago). Becker has stated in interviews that he began writing the song while in Santiago de Compostela, the end point of the pilgrimage, and that he was undergoing a profound reversion to his Christian/Catholic faith at that time.

"Morning by Morning" was released on August 8, 2025, and has been described as a track that "reimagines the love song through a cinematic and spiritual lens".

All three singles were produced by Calum Malcolm and feature contributions from various studio musicians, including drummers Ash Soan and Ross McFarlane, bassists Vinzenz Benjamin and Lewis Gordon, vocalists Doris Brendel, Jon Auer, and Ken Stringfellow, keyboardist Roger Joseph Manning Jr., and harmonica players Brendan Power and Ross Garren.

== Discography ==
Studio albums

- Le Concorde EP (2004)
- Universe and Villa (2005) – March Records / What Are Records?
- Suite EP (2007) – Le Grand Magistery
- House (2010) – Le Grand Magistery
- Second Mansions (2025)
