= First Rush =

Live album by Chris Rush
- Released: April 1973
- Recorded: 1972
- Studio: Magnagraphics Studios, NYC
- Genre: Comedy
- Length: 40:36
- Label: Atlantic Records (original release); Comedy Spotlight (re-release)
- Producer: Michael Cuscuna Allan Landon

Chris Rush chronology
First Rush (1973)	Beaming In (1981)

First Rush is the debut album by American comedian Chris Rush. The album was released in 1973 on Atlantic Records. Originally on LP and 8 track, the album was re-released as a digital download in 2009 by Comedy Spotlight.

"First Rush" is a reference to the state of euphoria one may have after the intake of an opiate. This is known commonly as a Rush.

Shorter promotional flexi discs titled, "This Is Your First Rush" were placed in the July '73 issue of National Lampoon Magazine, where Rush was an original contributing writer and editor from 1970-1973.

It was marketed as, "The Cosmic Comedy of Chris Rush" which was written on the back cover.

== Track listing ==
=== Side one ===
1. Even Nice People Get TV (Funk) (Puerto Rican Wagon Train) (Howdy Doody) – 4:32
2. Ca-Ca-Ah-Ah-Doody-Poo-Poo – 1:32
3. Grass (Munchie Monster) (The Dealer Man) (El Exigente) (Lawrence Talbot Turns On) (Filtered Prunes) – 9:00
4. Science Fiction (U.F.O.) (Alien Meets the Wino) (Star Trek) (Getting High in the Future) – 3:49

=== Side two ===
1. Jesus In A Dope Bust – 3:17
2. Sister John Damian's Virgin School – 6:22
3. Golden Zits Of The Fifties – 3:00
4. Mind Farts – 3:32
5. Naked Ape – 0:55
6. Blacula Meets Tar Baby – 2:52
7. Abie's Magic Hat – 1:45

== Personnel ==
- Bob Prewitt - Recording and Editing Engineer
- David Kuntz - Assistant Engineer
- George Laccorn - Assistant Engineer
- Johanna Prewitt - Assistant Engineer
- Thomas Hachtman - Art Direction
- Michael Sullivan - Photograph
- Paul Gorgone - Special Thanks
- Linda Meyer - Special Thanks
- Richard Skidmore - Special Thanks
- Bob Warner - Special Thanks
- Landrush Productions INC. - Management
