= Superhero (Stephen Lynch album) =

Live album by Stephen Lynch
- Released: January 14, 2003
- Recorded: March 14–15, 20–21, 2002 at Rascal's Comedy Club, West Orange, New Jersey; Rascal's Comedy Club, Ocean Township, Ocean County, New Jersey; Governor's, Levittown, New York; and Gotham Comedy Club, New York City, New York
- Genre: Comedy
- Length: 49:38
- Label: HaHa/What Are Records?

Stephen Lynch chronology
A Little Bit Special (2000)	Superhero (2003)	The Craig Machine (2005)

Professional ratings
Review scores
Source	Rating
Allmusic	3/5 stars

Superhero is a live album by singer/comedian Stephen Lynch. "Priest", "Mother's Day" and "Lullaby (The Divorce Song)" were originally recorded on his first CD A Little Bit Special. It was recorded live at four different comedy clubs in New York and New Jersey. Along with A Little Bit Special and The Craig Machine, the album has sold over 250,000 copies.

His second official album, Superhero, released in 2002, with What Are Records?, generally received better reviews than the first, partly because of strong audience response. The title track is 8 minutes and 58 seconds long, and largely consists of Lynch receiving the audience's suggestions for names for superheroes.

== Track listing ==
All tracks are written by Stephen Lynch.

No.	Title	Length
1.	"Talk to Me"	3:20
2.	"Dr. Stephen"	2:11
3.	"Priest" (Bonus live version)	4:29
4.	"Country Love Song"	2:12
5.	"Superhero"	8:58
6.	"What If That Guy from Smashing Pumpkins Lost His Car Keys?"	0:53
7.	"Mother's Day" (Bonus live version)	1:07
8.	"Taxi Driver"	1:28
9.	"For the Ladies"	1:24
10.	"Grandfather"	2:36
11.	"Bowling Song (Almighty Malachi, Professional Bowling God)"	5:01
12.	"She Gotta Smile"	2:58
13.	"Best Friends Song"	2:03
14.	"D & D"	2:47
15.	"Down to the Old Pub Instead"	3:13
16.	"Lullaby (The Divorce Song)"	8:21

A bonus live version of the song "Special Olympics" is included at about 5:40 into "Lullaby" (after a period of silence between the two songs), and was likely hidden there to avoid controversy over the title and content of the song.

== Personnel ==
- Stephen Lynch – guitar, vocals
- Mark Teich – vocals
- Marc Stedman – recording, mixing
- Travis Leonard – assistant engineering
- Franziska Kunze – assistant engineering
- Dan Kocen – assistant engineering
- Joe Lambert – mastering
- C.F.G. Design – artwork
- Danny Miller – photography
