= Outpost (The Samples album) =

Studio album by the Samples
- Released: 1996
- Recorded: 1995–1996
- Genre: Alternative rock
- Label: MCA
- Producer: Ed Thacker, Walt Beery

The Samples chronology
Autopilot (1994)	Outpost (1996)	Transmissions From the Sea of Tranquility (1997)

Outpost is an album by the Boulder, Colorado-based band the Samples, released in 1996. The first single was "The Lost Children (A Slow Motion Crash)". The band promoted Outpost by playing the H.O.R.D.E. Festival.

The album sold around 58,000 copies in its first two years of release. The band briefly broke up after promoting the album, before reforming with a different lineup.

== Production ==
The Samples were able to spend two years working on the album, due to label negotiations. Outpost includes re-recordings of two older songs, as well as a re-recording of a Sean Kelly song; it also contains an unlisted live track.

== Critical reception ==
Professional ratings
Review scores
Source	Rating
AllMusic	3/5 stars
Fort Worth Star-Telegram	3.5/5 stars
The Indianapolis Star	4/4 stars
MusicHound Rock: The Essential Album Guide	3.5/5 stars
New Straits Times	3.5/5 stars
Pittsburgh Post-Gazette	2.5/4 stars
The Republican	4/5 stars

The Washington Post wrote that "the Samples' music is still a bit blank, but it's consistently tuneful and mostly lively." The Hartford Courant noted that "the music is almost devoid of musical hooks, relying instead on [Sean] Kelly's vocals, background harmonies and pleasant arrangements among guitar, bass and keyboards to hold the listener's interest."

The Indianapolis Star stated: "From the dreamy, melancholy 'I Remember Dying' to the high-energy delivery of 'All My Thoughts (I Remember Johnny)', the Samples' Output ... reminds of a pre-Top 40 Fleetwood Mac." The Republican determined that "this is provocative stuff, at times reminiscent of everyone from the Police in their prime to early BoDeans and R.E.M."

== Track listing ==
All songs written by Sean Kelly, except where noted.

1. "Anyone" (Kelly, Andy Sheldon, Al Laughlin, Jeep MacNichol)
2. "Did You Ever Look So Nice"
3. "Learjet"
4. "Shine On"
5. "Big Bird" (MacNichol)
6. "Indiana"
7. "Birth of Words"
8. "It's Curtains" (Sheldon)
9. "The Lost Children (A Slow Motion Crash)"
10. "Foreign Countries" (Kelly, Laughlin)
11. "Information" (Kelly, Sheldon)
12. "All My Thoughts (Johnny Station Wagon)" (Sheldon)
13. "I Remember Dying" (Kelly, Sheldon)
14. "When It's Raining" (live hidden track, originally on No Room)

== Personnel ==
- Sean Kelly – lead vocals, guitar, harmonica, keyboards
- Andy Sheldon – bass, guitar, vocals
- Al Laughlin – keyboards
- Jeep MacNichol – drums, percussion, guitar, vocals
- Greg Leisz – slide guitar
- Eric Caudieux – keyboard programming, drum programming
- Walt Beery – guitar, background vocals
