= Traveling Light (Courtney Jaye album) =

Studio album by Courtney Jaye
- Released: June 7, 2005
- Genres: Pop music, rock
- Label: Island
- Producer: Peter Collins

Courtney Jaye chronology
Traveling Light (2005)	Til It Bleeds (2006)

Traveling Light is the debut album by Courtney Jaye, and was released by Island Records on June 7, 2005. The album peaked at #22 on the Billboard Top Heatseekers on June 25, 2005.

The song "Can't Behave" was featured in the 2006 film Aquamarine.

== Track listing ==
1. "Lose My Head" – 3:44 (Gala, Jaye)
2. "Can't Behave" – 3:34 (Gary Louris, Preven, Jaye)
3. "Permanent" – 3:55 (Cutler, Preven, Jaye)
4. "Mental" – 4:26 (Kristen Hall, Jaye)
5. "Time For Goodbye" – 4:17 (Hall, Jaye)
6. "Somersault" – 4:02 (Cutler, Preven, Jaye)
7. "Traveling Light" – 3:39 (Lewis, Petty, Jaye)
8. "Hanalei Road" – 4:14 (Lewis, Petty, Jaye)
9. "Can You Sleep" – 3:51 (Butch Walker, Jaye)
10. "Love Song (For Everyone)" – 4:24 (Lewis, Petty, Jaye)
11. "This Is The Day" – 4:52 (Nina Gordon, Jaye)
12. "Love Me" – 3:21 (Matthew Sweet, Jaye)

== Critical reception ==
Professional ratings
Review scores
Source	Rating
Deseret News	(mixed)
Guitar Player	(positive)

Tim Cain, from the Decatur, Illinois, paper Herald & Review, placed the album in his top 20 for 2005. The Deseret News was less positive, hailing the "decent hooks and memorable lyrics" of some songs, but criticizing the album as a whole: "Traveling Light is an appropriate title for Courtney Jaye's debut album. It's like light ice cream--good in theory but lacking the rich and creamy taste you're expecting." Matt Blackett, in Guitar Player, praises the album's "sweet, pop-inflected vocals and acoustic-driven tunes."

== Personnel ==
=== Musicians ===
- Courtney Jaye – vocals
- Taj Mahal – vocals
- Jeff Russo – guitar
- Rusty Anderson – guitar
- Danny Weissfeld – acoustic guitar, electric guitar
- Dan Petty – acoustic guitar
- Doug Petty – ukulele, piano
- Kris Wilkinson – viola
- David Henry – cello
- Gal Asher – Fender Rhodes piano, programming
- Tim Lauer – Wurlitzer piano, harmonium, Hammond b-3 organ
- Craig Young – bass
- Jerry Marotta – drums
- Josh Freese – drums
- Paulinho Da Costa – percussion

== Charts ==
Chart (2005)	Peak position
US Billboard Top Heatseekers	22
