= There's No Bones in Ice Cream =

Live album by Chris Rush
- Released: October 28, 1997
- Venue: Bananas Comedy Club
- Studio: Sundazed Studios
- Genre: Comedy
- Length: 57:48
- Label: Sundazed Music
- Producer: Bob Irwin

Chris Rush chronology
Beaming In (1981)	There's No Bones in Ice Cream (1997)

Professional ratings
Review scores
Source	Rating
Allmusic	4/5 stars

There's No Bones in Ice Cream is the third album by American comedian Chris Rush. The album was released in 1997 on Sundazed Music.

== Track listing ==
1. Living in New York (Punk Pigeon) (King Kong Blues) – 4:48
2. Insanity (Bungee Jumping) (Meeting The Lion) (Wacko, Texas) – 4:46
3. Murder Rate (Killer Apes) (Natural Born Killers) (Peeing On The Butt) (Old Man River) (Don Testosteroni) – 5:45
4. Macho (Dragonfly Love) (Naked Hang Gliding) (Sperm Whale's Peepee) (Snakes) – 4:29
5. PMS (Estrogen's Gift) (God's Sense Of Humor) (Baboon's Ass) – 3:12
6. War on Drugs (Cigarettes & Booze) (Twinkie Warehouse) (Altered States) (Cave Man Dreams) (Sodom & Gomorrah) (Cannibalism) – 10:52
7. Happiness & Shame (Earthquake Boogie) (Bomba The Gorilla) – 4:46
8. Terror (The Big Stone Ball) – 2:35
9. Vegetarianism (Eating The Dumb) – 1:26
10. Aliens (Farting In The Tub) (Einstein Meets E.T.) (The Intergalactic Fur Company) – 9:50
11. Reincarnation – 1:18
12. The Killer Bees – 1:25
13. Boogers – 2:36

== Personnel ==
- Vic Anesini - Engineer
- Peter Robertson - Engineer
- Rich Russell - Package Design
- Jeff Smith - Package Design
- Ghasem Ebrahimian - Photos
- Tim Livingston - Project Manager
