= A Little Bit Special =

Studio album by Stephen Lynch
- Released: October 3, 2000
- Recorded: March–April 2000
- Genre: Comedy
- Length: 48:31
- Label: HaHa Records
- Producer: Ivan Bodley

Stephen Lynch chronology
Half A Man (1998)	A Little Bit Special (2000)	Superhero (2003)

Professional ratings
Review scores
Source	Rating
Allmusic	2/5 stars

A Little Bit Special is the first album recorded by comedian Stephen Lynch. It was recorded at Park West Studios in Brooklyn, New York in 2000. Along with Superhero and The Craig Machine, the albums have sold over 250,000 copies.

In the song "Jim Henson's Dead", Lynch pays homage to many of the characters from The Muppet Show and Sesame Street, two of puppeteer Jim Henson's most famous creations. "R.D.C. (Opie's Lament)" is a song all about Rae Dawn Chong, who is Tommy Chong's daughter.

== Track listing ==
All tracks are written by Stephen Lynch.

No.	Title	Length
1.	"Lullaby (The Divorce Song)"	3:25
2.	"Half a Man"	3:01
3.	"Bitch"	1:05
4.	"Intro (Gortengar Trail)"	0:17
5.	"Special"	3:58
6.	"A Month Dead"	2:50
7.	"Priest"	4:13
8.	"Hair"	0:13
9.	"Intro (Super Karate Monkey Death Car)"	0:12
10.	"Gerbil"	3:06
11.	"Walken I"	0:33
12.	"R.D.C. (Opie's Lament)"	3:29
13.	"Mother's Day Song"	0:43
14.	"Intro (Curly McDimple)"	0:21
15.	"Herm Aphrodite"	2:51
16.	"Tall Glass O' Water"	0:51
17.	"Walken II"	0:31
18.	"In Defense of a Peepshow Girl"	3:02
19.	"Jim Henson's Dead"	3:04
20.	"Intro (A Tribute to Multigrain Bun)"	0:25
21.	"Gay"	3:02
22.	"Walken III"	7:19

- Includes: Bonus track – "Kitten"

== Personnel ==
- Stephen Lynch: Guitars, Vocals
- Kevin Bagot: Guitars
- Paul Loessel: Piano
- Ivan Bodley: Bass, Keyboards, Percussion
- Mike Denicola: Vocal Ad-Libs
- Jay Mohr, Mark Teich: Additional Vocals
