= The Craig Machine =

Live album by Stephen Lynch
- Released: October 4, 2005
- Recorded: May 9 and 16, 2005 at Symphony Space, New York City, New York
- Genre: Comedy
- Length: 41:47
- Label: What Are Records?

Stephen Lynch chronology
Superhero (2002)	The Craig Machine (2005)	Cleanest Hits (2006)

Professional ratings
Review scores
Source	Rating
Allmusic	2.5/5 stars

The Craig Machine is a live album by comedian Stephen Lynch, released on October 4, 2005, on What Are Records?. The CD was recorded live at Symphony Space in New York City on May 9 and 16, 2005. The Craig Machine debuted at #2 on Billboard Magazine's Comedy Charts and at #129 on the Billboard 200.

The title is lifted from a lyric from the fifth track on the album, which is from the point of view of Jesus Christ's brother, Craig. The quoted lyric asks of the listener "not 'What Would Jesus Do?' but 'Where will you be when the Craig Machine comes partyin' through?'"

== Songs and Lyrics ==
- "Vanilla Ice Cream" – The narrator prefers dating dark skinned women, but declares he is not a racist; "some of my best friends are white." Reviewer Dylan P. Gadino praised the song: "In the galloping 'Vanilla Ice Cream,' a sort of love song to African-American women Lynch sings, 'If you're a honky, you're singing the wrong key."
- "Baby" – Gadino wrote, "The most offensive song, "Baby" — wherein the song's subject hopes his ugly newborn gets SIDS — is also the catchiest. We dare you not to sing the chorus."
- "Craig" - Lynch describes it as "about Jesus Christ's ne'er-do-well brother Craig"
- "Little Tiny Moustache" – While on a European tour, Lynch told the audience, "It's so funny, you know, I've played that song twice now in Europe; and you guys just get it. And back in the States, people get all fuckin' freaked out when I mention the Nazi, and they think that it's like this weird, pro-Nazi song; and it's so the opposite! It's obviously about a guy who is just too stupid to realize that his girlfriend is a Nazi." Gadino wrote, "One of the more absurdly themed songs, 'Little Tiny Moustache,' about dating a Nazi woman who 'quoted Mein Kampf in our fifth anniversary card' is also the most musically delicate, beautiful song on Machine."

== Reception ==
Album reviewer Dylan P. Gadino wrote, "On his third disc, The Craig Machine, Lynch continues his reign as one of the nation's most skilled singing comedians. Armed with a voice sweeter than most all-too-earnest contemporary singer/songwriters...a keen sense of pop song structure and a wickedly vile sense of humor, the Michigan native keeps us guessing and, more importantly, laughing throughout the new 14-song collection. For Lynch, the guitar clearly isn't a novelty. It's the vehicle for every punchline. As a result, he's careful to construct real songs — as in the type you'd hear on traditional pop albums, the kind that people will listen to repeatedly. Of course, there are a few quick throwaways — see "Love Song" and "Not Home" — peppered throughout for cheap, hard, laughs. But largely, there are plenty of hooks on which to grab hold. ... Part of Lynch's draw is that he commits equally to both music and joke on each track."

The TVParty site reviewer wrote, "Stephen Lynch's musical tour de force through his demented psyche begins with a heaping hunk of blasphemy followed by even more sacrilegious tuneage along with peppy songs about dating white girls, loving Nazis, wishing for his grandfather's death, and a cute ditty about Satan (more blasphemy). But it works. This guy can really write some funny tunes and he has the vocal chops to pull it off."

== Track listing ==
All tracks composed and performed by Stephen Lynch.

All tracks are written by Stephen Lynch.

No.	Title	Length
1.	"Vanilla Ice Cream"	3:10
2.	"Baby"	3:30
3.	"Halloween"	2:46
4.	"Love Song"	1:23
5.	"Craig"	3:30
6.	"Beelz"	2:54
7.	"Albino"	1:52
8.	"Mixer at Delta Chi"	2:06
9.	"Little Tiny Mustache"	3:40
10.	"Pierre"	2:01
11.	"Whittlin’ Man"	2:51
12.	"Classic Rock Song"	2:12
13.	"Not Home"	1:14
14.	"Voices in My Head"	4:09

CD bonus tracks
No.	Title	Length
15.	"D&D (2005 Bonus Version)"	4:27
16.	"Lullaby (Live in NYC, 05_2005)"	3:14

== Personnel ==
- Stephen Lynch – guitar, vocals, production
- Rod Cone – vocals on "Pierre", "Whittlin' Man", "Voices in My Head", and "D&D"
- Mark Teich – 'fake harmonica', vocals on "Pierre", "Classic Rock Song" and "D&D"
- Ivan Bodley – bass guitar, vocals on "Voices in My Head"
- Rich Campbell – piano, vocals on "Voices in My Head"
- Marc Stedman – production, engineering
- Joe Lambert – mastering
- Cara Waugaman – photography

== Charts ==
Chart (2005)	Peak position
US Billboard 200	129
US Heatseekers Albums (Billboard)	3
US Independent Albums (Billboard)	7
US Top Comedy Albums (Billboard)	2
