= Stephen Lynch (musician) =

American comedian, musician and actor (born 1971)

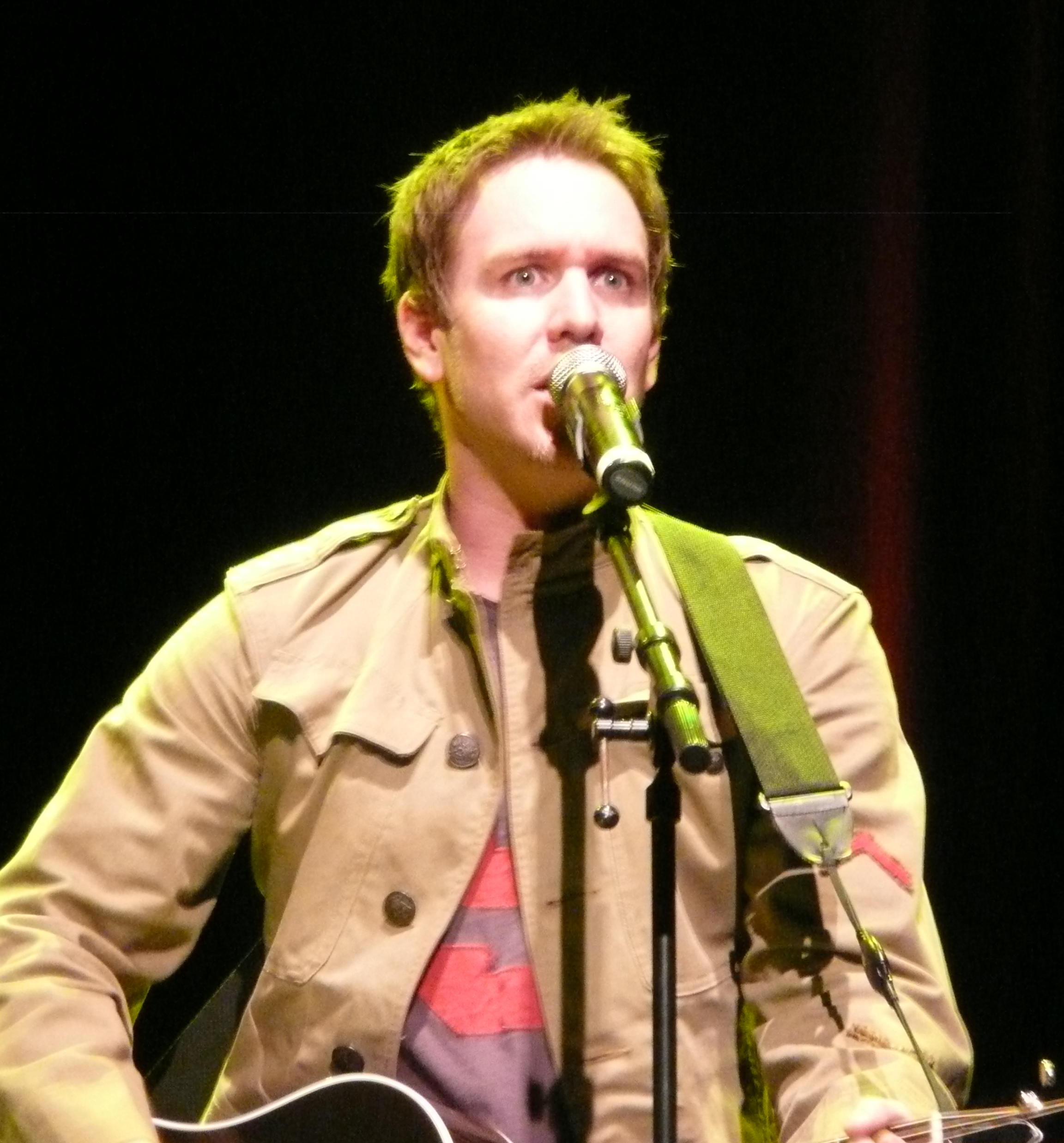
- Lynch in 2008
- Born: July 28, 1971 (age 55); Abington Township, Pennsylvania, U.S.
- Spouse: Erin Dwight (September 2003–present)
- Relatives: Drew Lynch (brother)

Comedy career
- Years active: 1996–present
- Medium: Musician, comedy, television, theater
- Genres: Musical theatre, Stand-up comedy, Comedy rock, Country
- Musical career
- Instruments: Vocals, guitar
- Label: What Are Records?
- Website: StephenLynch.com

Stephen Andrew Lynch (born July 28, 1971) is an American comedian, musician and actor who is known for his satirical songs mocking daily life and popular culture. Lynch has released four studio albums and four live albums along with a live DVD. This 2004 DVD, Live at the El Rey, was certified Gold by the Recording Industry Association of America (RIAA).

He has appeared in two Comedy Central Presents specials and starred in the Broadway adaptation of The Wedding Singer, earning multiple award nominations. Lynch released a double-disc album, Lion, in 2012, and a live concert video, Hello, Kalamazoo, in 2016. Like Lion, 2019's My Old Heart was half recorded in studio and half from a live concert. The A to Z Entertainment website has written, "His unique blend of musical based comedy has earned him fiercely loyal fans around the world who live to experience his sold-out live shows." His albums have sold hundreds of thousands of copies around the world, and he is touring again ("The Me Tour") in 2025.

== Early life and education ==
Lynch was born in Abington, Pennsylvania. His family later moved to Saginaw, Michigan. He has a younger brother, Andrew, known as Drew (not standup comic Drew Lynch, who is unrelated), who also became a stage actor. Their parents, Leo R. and Judith (Hayes) Lynch, were a former priest and a former nun. Both parents became teachers, and Leo Lynch sang in a folk trio, The New Image. Stephen Lynch told an interviewer, "I don't really use religious imagery in my act, so from that perspective it wasn't really a factor. However, our parents always encouraged us to express ourselves creatively and it was always a very musical household."

Like his sons, Lynch's father was a stage actor as well as a singer. Lynch's earliest work in the theater was performing with his father in local community theater productions in Saginaw as a child. The first live musical he saw was Man of La Mancha, a community theater production in which his father played the role of the Padre.

Lynch would perform in community theater and musical theater while attending Arthur Hill High School and the Center for the Arts and Sciences (now the Saginaw Arts and Sciences Academy), from which he graduated in 1988. He received a theater scholarship to attend the Catholic University of America in Washington, D.C., before transferring in 1990 to Western Michigan University, from which he graduated with a BA in drama in 1993. While attending Western Michigan University, he began to write comedic songs.

Considering himself a musician first and a comedian second, Lynch cites singer/songwriters Paul Simon and Joni Mitchell as his childhood inspirations, rather than comedians. He was inspired to go into show business after seeing the mockumentary This is Spinal Tap. The first song that he wrote, at age 15, was a country song titled "Beefy Burrito". In it, a cowboy breaks up with his girlfriend, then goes to a diner, where his entrée reminds him of his lost love.

== Career ==
=== Early career ===
After spending his first year out of college with friends in California, then working summers from 1993 to 1995 at The Barn Theatre in Augusta, Michigan, Lynch moved to New York City in 1996 with the intention of becoming an actor. Upon his arrival, a friend at the West Bank Cafe on 42nd Street suggested Lynch play, for an audience, some of the comic songs he had written while attending university. He soon found success in comedy clubs and other venues around the city (notably Catch a Rising Star and Caroline's), and became a regular on radio shows such as Opie and Anthony. Lynch spent his early years in New York City doing what he called "totally mindless work" as a temp worker. He quit such temporary jobs permanently, signing with What Are Records? in 2000 and Vision International in 2002.

Over the next few years, he toured colleges, universities, and nightclubs around the country, avoiding the comedy club circuit as much as possible, which he has stated is not to his taste. He periodically returned to Michigan to do summer stock. During his March 6, 2009, appearance on The Bob and Tom Show, Lynch mentioned Steel Toast as the name of the band in which he first performed. As of the start of his 3 Balloons tour in spring 2009, Agency for the Performing Arts books all of his concert dates.

=== 2000 to present ===
Lynch often played venues more often suited to music than to comedy, including locations such as the House of Blues, The Town Hall and the esteemed Carnegie Hall. He gained national exposure with his Comedy Central Presents special in 2000, which became one of their highest-rated performances. He has made appearances on Comedy Central's Premium Blend, The World Comedy Tour, and The World Stands Up. He has also made four appearances on Last Call with Carson Daly, and has performed at the Just for Laughs Comedy Festival in Montreal, Quebec, Canada.

Lynch has opened for comedians Jay Mohr, Jeff Foxworthy, Steven Wright, Bobcat Goldthwait, and Lewis Black. In the summer of 2004, he began a tour co-headlining with Mitch Hedberg, which ended in 2005.

He has appeared in five short films, including The Love Seat in 1999 and The Confetti Brothers in 2001. Both films were written and directed by Kirker Butler. The Confetti Brothers, a satire, screened to packed houses at the 2001 Cannes Film Festival. It continues to play the film festival circuit. In 2002's award-winning Pillowfighter, he played Chet Sheplynn, a folklorist/folksinger.

In 2004, Lynch recorded a concert at the El Rey Theatre in Los Angeles, joined by his brother Drew Lynch (not the identically named "stuttering stand-up comedian" Drew Lynch) and his friend Mark Teich as backup singers. It was released as the Live at the El Rey DVD. The DVD includes a commentary track, a clip from one of Lynch's earliest live performances (featuring "Jim Henson's Dead"), a clip of Lynch recording "Lullaby" in the studio for his first album, A Little Bit Special and a short film recorded by Lynch's wife, Erin Dwight, titled Lynch and Teich in Brooklyn.

In April 2006, Lynch starred as Robbie Hart in the Broadway musical The Wedding Singer, which ran on Broadway from April 27, 2006, through December 31, 2006, at the Al Hirschfeld Theatre. This musical production was based on the 1998 New Line Cinema film The Wedding Singer, starring Adam Sandler and Drew Barrymore. The musical, Lynch's Broadway debut, co-starred Tony winner Laura Benanti in the role of Julia Sullivan, played by Barrymore in the film. His performance has earned him nominations for Tony, Drama League, and Drama Desk awards.

In 2007, Lynch returned to the road again, touring with comedians such as Bob Saget, Frank Caliendo, Louis C.K., Carlos Mencia and others on the Opie and Anthony's Traveling Virus Comedy Tour. He performed the song "Two Feet Firm" for the soundtrack of the 2007 comedy film The Ten, with backup singers Rashida Jones, Amy Miles, and Craig Wedren.

Lynch starred in his second Comedy Central Presents special in January 2008. He also performed on his first European tours in 2008, headlining concerts in England, Sweden, Norway, Finland, the Netherlands, Ireland, Scotland, and Germany. His newfound European popularity resulted in appearances at six festivals in August and September 2008.

He returned to Europe in fall 2009, and toured the UK in March 2010, headlining London's Brixton Academy on March 5, 2010. Lynch's second studio album, 3 Balloons, was released on March 10, 2009.

The Lost Media Archive reports that Lynch announced, in February 2010, that a concert had been filmed in Portland, Oregon ("most likely on March 16, 2009 at the Aladdin Theater"). Lynch's website stated that the film, entitled An Evening with Stephen Lynch, would "air later this year, with a new DVD to follow." However, Lynch was unhappy with the material, his site was edited to delete the promise, and the project was quietly shelved.

In June 2011, Lynch performed at Chinateatern in Stockholm and at Kulturens Hus in Luleå, as well as venues in Gothenburg and Malmö, Sweden. Lion, a double live/studio album, was released on November 13, 2012, to solid reviews.

In 2016, Lynch recorded a live show at the Little Theatre in Kalamazoo, Michigan, called Hello, Kalamazoo, which was directed by Kevin Romeo of Rhino Media. It was released as a DVD.

Lynch began the My Old Heart Tour on January 11, 2017, to begin showcasing material for his upcoming new album My Old Heart. On February 21, 2018, Lynch announced that the album was finished and he was due to record a live album to accompany it at The Reality Factory in Kalamazoo, Michigan, on March 16, 2018. On March 17, 2019, Lynch confirmed via Twitter that My Old Heart would be released on June 14, 2019.

As Lynch's repertoire of material includes duets and a few songs for three voices, close university pals and fellow comedians Mark Teich (of The Second City; he died in 2021) and Rod Cone (of The Rod Cone Situation) have been frequent guests on his tours. More recently, he toured with Courtney Jaye, his co-performer for Lion. He has also done shows with his brother Drew and with former Wedding Singer castmate David Josefsberg.

In 2021, Lynch began "The Time Machine Tour" across the US.

On September 2, 2025 Lynch announced “The Me Tour” and the existence of his seventh album, Me in a post with the caption “NEW TOUR, NEW ALBUM, NEW ME!”. On September 12, 2026, he announced the name and artwork for his album. The album was officially released on September 15, 2026 on iTunes.

== Personal life ==
He married Erin Dwight on a private beach on Lake Michigan in September 2003, and she is generally the first person to hear his original ideas for songs; if she does not laugh at the initial concept, he will scrap the idea completely.

Lynch has stated that, although they were raised Roman Catholic, religion was not forced upon the brothers growing up. He told an interviewer, "Nah, my parents left the church a long time before I was born. They were actually rebellious themselves — they were 1960s, rabble-rousing, peace-marching people. We didn't go to church much. It was actually a very liberal, progressive home to grow up in, and both of my parents had a great sense of humor." His father's past included being part of a duo who sang at antiwar protests during the Vietnam War.

Lynch's father Leo died October 9, 2009. Although he canceled several performances as a result, Lynch still performed at Central Michigan University on October 16.

== Discography ==
=== Demo ===
Album Information
Half A Man
- Released: 1998
- Label: –
- Chart Positions: –
- RIAA Certification: –
- Singles:
- Notes: A demo of Lynch's early material.

=== Studio albums ===
Album Information
A Little Bit Special
- Released: October 3, 2000 (US)
- Label: HaHa & What Are Records?
- Chart Positions: Top Internet Albums – 7
- RIAA Certification: –
- Singles:
- Notes: Debut Album
3 Balloons
- Released: March 24, 2009 (US)
- Label: What Are Records?
- Chart Positions: Billboard 200 - 152
- RIAA Certification: –
- Singles:
- Notes: 1st studio album since 2000
Lion
- Released: November 13, 2012 (US)
- Label: What Are Records?
- Chart Positions: Top Internet Albums –
- RIAA Certification: –
- Singles: "Tattoo"
- Notes: Double album (Live & Studio)
My Old Heart
- Released: July 19, 2019 (US)
- Label: 800 Pound Gorilla Records
- Chart Positions: -
- RIAA Certification: -
- Singles: -
- Notes: Double album (Studio & Live)
Me
- Released: September 15, 2026 (US)
- Label: Self-released
- Chart Positions: -
- RIAA Certification: -
- Singles: -
- Notes:

=== Live albums ===
Album Information
Superhero
- Released: January 14, 2003 (US)
- Label: What Are Records?
- Chart Positions: –
- RIAA Certification: –
- Singles:
- Notes: Appeared on Top Internet Albums Chart in 2003
The Craig Machine
- Released: October 4, 2005 (US)
- Label: What Are Records?
- Chart Positions: Billboard 200 – 129
- RIAA Certification: –
- Singles:
- Notes: Recorded in New York City in May 2005
Lion
- Released: November 13, 2012 (US)
- Label: What Are Records?
- Chart Positions: Top Internet Albums –
- RIAA Certification: –
- Singles: "Tattoo"
- Notes: Double album (Live & Studio)
My Old Heart
- Released: July 19, 2019 (US)
- Label: 800 Pound Gorilla Records
- Chart Positions: -
- RIAA Certification: -
- Singles: -
- Notes: Double album (Studio & Live)

=== Compilation ===
Album Information
Cleanest Hits
- Released: June 7, 2006 (US)
- Label: What Are Records?
- Chart Positions: –
- RIAA Certification: –
- Singles:
- Notes: A clean greatest hits album. Sold at Walmart and at showings of The Wedding Singer

== Videography ==
=== Live Show ===
Album Information
Live at the El Rey
- Released: September 28, 2004 (US)
- Label: Razor & Tie
- Chart Positions: –
- RIAA Certification: Gold (March 2006)
- Singles:
- Notes: DVD.
Hello, Kalamazoo
- Released: March 21, 2016
- Label: -
- Chart Positions: –
- Singles:
- Notes: Originally a Vimeo exclusive, no longer available on that platform.
