= Chris Rush =

American actor (1946–2018)

- Born: Christopher John Mistretta; February 11, 1946; Brooklyn, New York, United States
- Died: January 28, 2018 (aged 71); Forest Hills, Queens, New York, United States
- Spouse: Michele Shoshanna April (m. 1968; div. 1978)
- Partner(s): Megan De Caro (1993–2018)

Comedy career
- Years active: 1970–2018
- Medium: Stand-up, television, radio, literature
- Genres: Observational humor, satire, black comedy
- Subjects: Drug use, religion, everyday life, politics, quantum physics, outer space

Chris Rush (born Christopher John Mistretta; February 11, 1946 – January 28, 2018) was an American comedian, writer, actor, radio personality and author. He is best known for his stand-up routines and albums, along with having been a writer and editor on the satirical publication National Lampoon magazine.

== Biography ==
=== Early life ===
Rush was born in Brooklyn, New York. Rush was of Italian descent and was raised in the Roman Catholic faith. He attended Brooklyn Technical High School and graduated from City College of New York in 1968 with a degree in Organic chemistry. Before becoming a comedian Rush was a molecular biologist, working at Brooklyn Jewish Hospital for two years. He embarked on a professional stand-up comedy career following the first time he ever performed on stage, which was an open mic night at The Gaslight Cafe, where he received a standing ovation after his performance.

=== Influences ===
Comedians who influenced Rush: George Carlin, Bob Newhart, Shelley Berman and Myron Cohen

Comedians who consider Rush an influence: Adam Ferrara

=== Personal life ===
Rush was a conservationist and supporter of Greenpeace. Though raised in the Catholic faith he left the church around age 12. He considered himself to be a Taoist and wore the Yin and yang symbol on his shirt during his performances.

Chris Rush died January 28, 2018, of complications from surgery and cancer.

== Career ==
=== 1970s and 1980s ===
Chris Rush wrote for National Lampoon Magazine in the early 1970s, making his first appearance in the August, 1970 issue. During his time at the Lampoon he was involved in another comedy magazine titled Drool, which came out with just one issue in 1972. He left the magazine when he was signed to Atlantic Records by Ahmet Ertegun to release his first comedy album, First Rush in 1973. In 1974 he once again contributed to a comedy magazine titled Harpoon. Towards the later years of the 1970s; Rush, was involved with Head Magazine.

Rush opened for musicians and bands including B.B. King, Meat Loaf, Talking Heads, Twisted Sister and Electric Light Orchestra while becoming a frequent performer at comedy clubs, theaters and colleges throughout the United States and Canada. He performed at such venues as The Bottom Line, Caroline's, The Improv and The Comedy Store. In 1979 he was awarded "Best Male Comic" by the Association of Comedy Artists. He released his second album Beaming In in 1981. His performances landed him on national television with appearances on Comedy Tonight, Night Flight and Apt. 2C, a pilot for HBO starring his mentor and friend George Carlin

=== 1990s and 2000s ===
In the early to mid-1990s, Rush was involved in a series of shorts made for Comedy Central's show Small Doses, titled Food for Thought. It starred Patton Oswalt and Blaine Capatch as two bumbling store clerks and Chris as the manager. He was asked to contribute to Tim Allen's book I'm Not Really Here, which was released in 1996. He released an additional comedy album in 1997. During this time, he made sporadic stand-up comedy appearances. He worked on Bob "Wolf" Wohlfeld's show in the late 1990s on PYX 106 with The Wakin' Up with the Wolf Show, where he was a co-host. Some of his bits were put onto an album released by the show, titled Chris's Head. The relationship ended though when the station decided to fire Rush on December 21, 1998, after apparently speaking to management about Wohlfeld's behavior towards him and others.

On October 1, 2007, Rush released his first book, Milking the Rhino (Dangerously Funny Lists).

In April, 2009 Chris launched a one-man show titled, Bliss: An Evening of Laughter with Chris Rush, which was financed by George Carlin.

=== Discography ===
Year	Album	Label
1973	First Rush	Atlantic Records
1981	Beaming In	City Sounds
1997	There's No Bones in Ice Cream	Sundazed Music

=== Television ===
- Apt. 2C – HBO
- The Bob McLean Show
- Canada AM – (Multiple appearances)
- Comedy on the Road – A&E
- Comedy Tonight – Comedy Central
- Don Kirshner's Rock Concert
- Late Night with David Letterman
- Night Flight
- Rascals Comedy Hour
- Showtime Comedy Club Network – Showtime
- Small Doses – Comedy Central
- Spotlight Cafe
- Stand-Up Spotlight – VH-1
- The Tonight Show Starring Johnny Carson

=== Radio ===
In addition to being a co-host on PYX 106, Rush was a frequent guest on The Joey Reynolds Show, The Morning Zoo on WMMR, Esoterica with Johnny Rizzo on WPKN, where he contributed a monthly call-in segment discussing recent events, Dr. Demento, who will sometimes play Chris' comedy routines and he's also appeared on Opie and Anthony.
