= J&R =

American electronics and music retailer (1971–2014)

Coordinates: 40°42′41″N 74°00′27″W

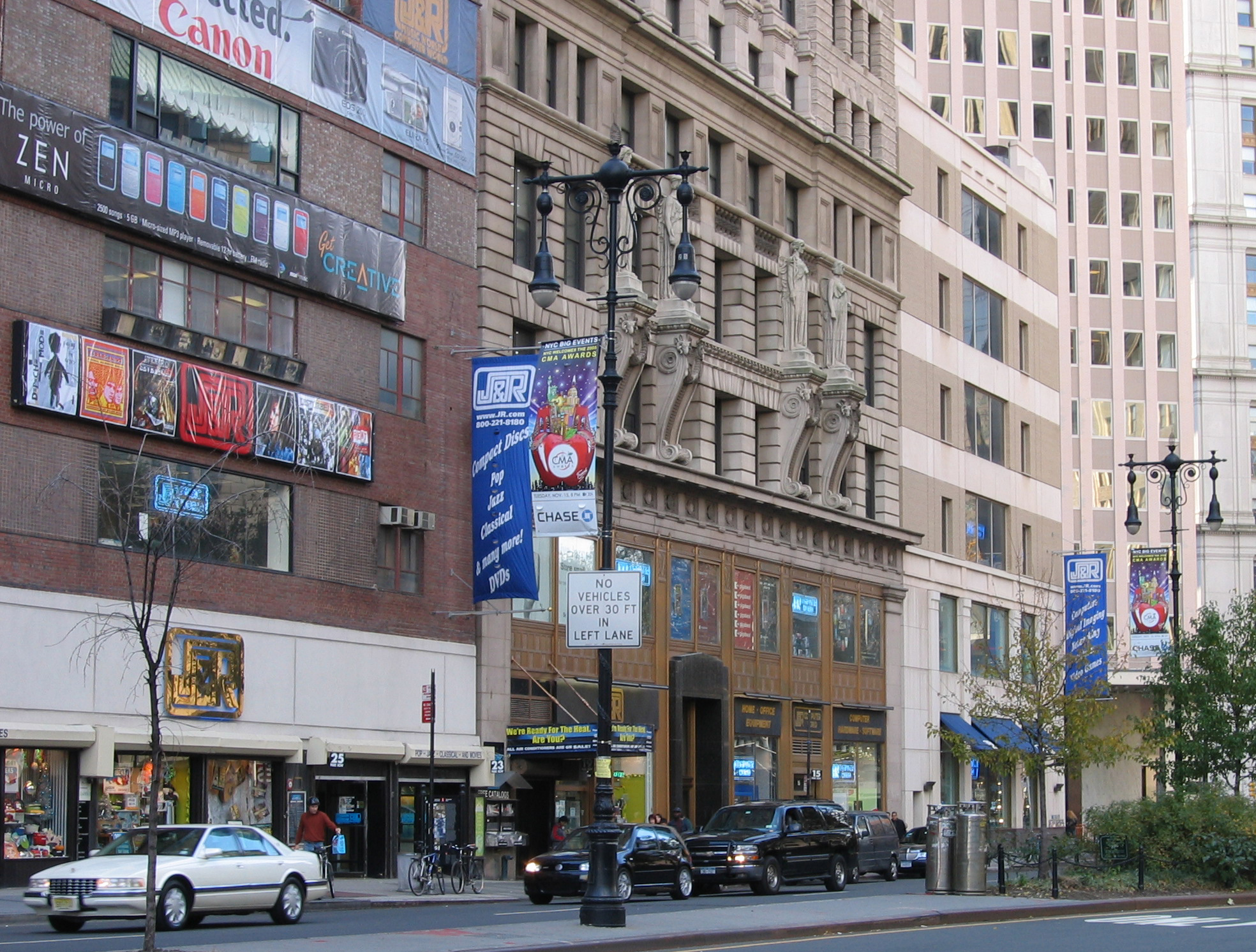
- J&R's Park Row location, seen in 2005
- Type: Private
- Founded: 1971; 55 years ago
- Founders: Joseph Friedman; Rachelle Friedman
- Defunct: April 9, 2014; 12 years ago
- Fate: Closed
- Headquarters: New York City, New York
- Number of locations: 2 (April 2014; at time of main store closing)
- Products: Retail - Electronics
- Website: Last snapshot of archives website (2016)

J&R was an electronics and music retailer, based in New York City, United States. It had a well-known retail location on Park Row in Civic Center, Manhattan, across from New York City Hall, from 1971 to 2014. J&R stands for the founders Joe and Rachelle Friedman who established the company in 1971 after emigrating separately from Israel as young children. The heavily trafficked store had expanded from selling LPs to eventually encompassing J&R Music World and J&R Computer World, selling everything from Blu-ray Disc players to the latest electronic gadgets.

J&R also had a location at Columbia University, which closed in late 2002. J&R later opened a J&R Express at the bottom level of Macy's Herald Square in 2006, and which was later closed in 2012.

== History ==
In 1971, 20-year-old newlyweds Joseph and Rachelle Friedman started J&R as a small consumer electronics store selling stereos and television sets in a 500 square foot store front at 23 Park Row The couple saw it as a side project, selling TVs and stereos out of a 500 square foot store, as Rachelle studied at Polytechnic University (New York) in Brooklyn.

After customers started to ask about obtaining music to play on their new stereos, J&R started to carry records and tapes. Computers, digital accessories and other electronics products followed. As it grew, J&R expanded into a series of adjacent storefronts on Park Row, so that the store stretched for nearly a full block by the mid-1990s, with each storefront providing entry to a different department. The large overall store was increasingly successful and crowded with customers.

A mail order division was started in 1974. It was supported by a company owned warehouse located in Maspeth in Queens. Internet orders were later fulfilled from this location.

In 2006, J&R opened J&R Express, a 3,500 square foot store within a store inside the Macy's Herald Square store. The store carried MP3 players, digital cameras, computers, CDs, DVDs and cell phones. The store also accepted the Macy’s credit card as payment. The store was quietly closed in 2012. Macy's previously tried to sell consumer electronics at the same location with other outside vendors twice in the previous decade.

In 2013, J&R consolidated into two buildings, ceding storefronts to new tenants and transforming into a vertical store. After a disappointing 2013 holiday season, J&R settled about $15 million in outstanding vendor claims in February 2014.

The 171,000 square feet (15,900 m^{2}) company owned warehouse facility in Maspeth was listed on the real estate market beginning in October 2013. In addition to left-over merchandise, warehouse and other processing equipment used by the company were auctioned off in late May and again in June.

On April 9, 2014, J&R closed its Park Row store, with a redevelopment plan to be announced. Remaining merchandise were liquidated through a two-day auction in the middle of May 2014. On April 25, 2014, J&R's web site stated that the owners planned to "rebuild this location into what we hope will be an unprecedented retailing concept and social mecca", also stating that they "look[ed] forward to sharing more details of these changes in the coming months." The page included an artist's conception of what the location would look like.

On August 12, 2014, J&R announced that they planned to open a 1,500 square foot J&R Express store inside the flagship location of the Century 21 Department Store in Manhattan by October 2014. Twice magazine reported that the new store would have a format similar to that used by the store that was within Macy's Herald Square store and which closed in 2012. Billboard Magazine reported that J&R planned to sell audio and video hardware, computers, and electronics, along with some music (including vinyl) and movies. J&R Express at Century 21 opened in November 2014. Sometime between May and June 2016, J&R ceased their business relationship with Century with J&R Express being last recorded on the Century 21 website in an Internet Archive snapshot of March 14 and in the snapshot of the J&R website of May 5. By June 2, all mentions of J&R Express had been removed from both websites.

Meanwhile, some of the buildings on Park Row that formerly housed J&R were demolished, starting in January 2016. Other buildings, which were leased, were being redeveloped primarily for residential housing, such as the landmarked Park Row Building at 15 Park Row. In April 2016, it was reported in the New York real estate press that J&R filed for a building permit to build a 53 story residential building on the demolished site. By late 2018, the former 25 Park Row site had been replaced by a 50-story, 110-unit, luxury condo building with residential unit prices ranging from $1.7 million for one-bedrooms to about $7 million for four-bedrooms, or approximately $2,500 per foot ($8,200/m), called 25 Park Row. According to the Internet Archive, the jr.com website was taken down sometime between January 5 and January 17, 2017, when Network Solutions regained control of the website for resale. The remaining website at http://jandr.com/, which has been unreachable since late 2022, formerly said, "Stay tuned for exciting updates..."

== Online sales ==
With the main J&R location just a block from the World Trade Center site, the company lost millions of dollars of electronic equipment due to the September 11, 2001 attacks. But, the company's growing online sales helped sustain the company. J&R had an Amazon Marketplace agreement with Amazon.com to sell merchandise through that channel, in addition to its own online store. By May 6, 2014, the firm had closed down its website but continued to sell through Amazon.com and eBay. J&R appeared to be liquidating its existing inventory via these marketplaces and did not show significant stock in major categories such as digital cameras. Both J&R storefronts on eBay and Amazon had ceased to offer any merchandise for sale by June 2014 after the series of liquidation auctions had occurred at both the former Manhattan store and the Maspeth warehouse in Queens.

== Summerfest ==
Since the summer of 2002, J&R had sponsored an annual music festival in City Hall Park, featuring R&B and other performers. In June 2007, Summerfest performers included Mario, Bobby Valentino, Tank, Carl Thomas, Collie Buddz, and Canadian Brass.

== See also ==
- B&H Photo Video
- P. C. Richard & Son
