= H.O.R.D.E. =

Music festival in the United States

Horizons of Rock Developing Everywhere or H.O.R.D.E. Festival was a touring summer rock music festival originated by the musical group Blues Traveler in 1992. In addition to travelling headliners, the festival gave exposure to bands, charities, and organizations from the local area of the concert.

== History ==
The H.O.R.D.E. Festival began in 1992 as a solution to the dilemma of five East Coast bands that sought to avoid the club circuit in the summertime when other larger bands were playing to sold out amphitheaters. John Popper, the singer for Blues Traveler, explained this in a Guitar World interview: "In the summer, we'd all go out and draw maybe one or two thousand people. And there are no places outdoors that small, so we'd have to play indoors, which sucked. Then a couple of us got together and wondered 'What if we all went on tour?'. If we each drew our usual two thousand people, we might draw enough to fill a big shed (amphitheater). So from the outside, it may have looked like there was this big movement happening, but really, it was just a bunch of bands thinking about how to survive."

Inspired by the previous summer's success of Perry Farrell's Lollapalooza festival (which had been organized by Bill Graham Presents, the driving force behind Blues Traveler's record and promotional deal), John Popper and Dave Frey called upon their compatriots Widespread Panic, The Samples, the Spin Doctors, the Aquarium Rescue Unit and Phish to join them in a nationwide, summer, amphitheater tour. After originally christening the traveling spectacle "Horizons of Rock Developing East Coast", the vision spread to "Everywhere", and so the name was created. It is rumored John Popper came up with the idea of the H.O.R.D.E. tour at Arrowhead Ranch, a Deadhead-managed dude ranch in Parksville, New York, where Phish, Blues Traveler, Spin Doctors, Widespread Panic and Aquarium Rescue Unit, among others, had played in 1991.

The H.O.R.D.E. tour can be viewed as the beginnings of the second incarnation of jam band music, as well as the improvisation, community of fans, and diversity of music that became trademarks of the genre. The initial incarnation of jam music, led and epitomized by bands like the Grateful Dead and the Allman Brothers Band, sparked a love for improvisational rock and jazz that was fostered by both the musicians and fans associated with the second wave of 'jam' music. The H.O.R.D.E. tour, featuring such new jam icons as the Spin Doctors, Phish, Widespread Panic, the Aquarium Rescue Unit (and subsequent Col. Bruce Hampton projects), including Dave Matthews Band, allowed for a new generation of experimental improvisational music to hit a national audience. The festival was able to bring together a group of musicians with a similar approach to live performance, and thus consolidate fans of the music; hence, a scene was created around the developing genre.

After seven successful years, the final H.O.R.D.E. Tour concert took place on September 5, 1998, at Portland Meadows in Portland, Oregon.

== Artists ==
The following artists participated in the H.O.R.D.E. festival:

- 311
- Agents of Good Roots
- Alana Davis
- Allgood
- The Allman Brothers Band
- Aquarium Rescue Unit
- Barenaked Ladies
- Beck
- Bela Fleck and the Flecktones
- Ben Folds Five
- Ben Harper and the Innocent Criminals
- Big Head Todd and The Monsters
- The Black Crowes
- Blues Traveler
- Bran Van 3000
- Cake Like
- Chief Broom
- Chris Stills
- Chrysalids
- Cowboy Mouth
- Cycomotogoat
- Dan Dyer with Breedlove
- Dave Matthews Band
- David Garza
- Dear Liza
- The Decadent Royals
- Dionne Farris
- Emmet Swimming
- Elderberry Jam
- Endorphin
- Fastball
- Fathead
- Foodstamp
- The Freddy Jones Band
- Galactic
- G. Love & Special Sauce
- God Street Wine
- Gov't Mule
- The Hatters
- Joan Osborne
- King Crimson
- Kula Shaker
- Leftover Salmon
- Lenny Kravitz
- Marcy Playground
- Medeski, Martin & Wood
- The Mighty Mighty Bosstones
- Morphine
- The Mother Hips
- Mr. Reality
- Natalie Merchant
- Neil Young and Crazy Horse
- Patoombah Whitebread Rhythm Ensemble
- Paula Cole
- Pete Droge and the Sinners
- Phish
- Primus
- Rickie Lee Jones
- Robert Bradley's Blackwater Surprise
- Rudy
- Rusted Root
- Screamin' Cheetah Wheelies
- Sheryl Crow
- Sister 7
- Sky Cries Mary
- Smashing Pumpkins
- Son Volt
- Soul Coughing
- Soulhat
- Spin Doctors
- Spiritualized
- Squirrel Nut Zippers
- Super 8
- Taj Mahal & The Phantom Blues Band
- The Authority
- Twenty Nineteen
- The Samples
- The Thundercloud Singers
- The Tragically Hip
- Toad The Wet Sprocket
- Ugly Americans
- The Verve Pipe
- Ween
- Widespread Panic
- Wilco
- Ziggy Marley and the Melody Makers

== Return ==
There were rumors over the years that the band would eventually revive the H.O.R.D.E. tour. Asked about this in 2006, Blues Traveler drummer Brendan Hill replied, "The future is always bright for us, and we are constantly thinking about the future, maybe two or three years in advance." The H.O.R.D.E. Festival was officially revived on July 9, 2015, featuring Blues Traveler, 311, The Verve Pipe and Big Head Todd and the Monsters. The inaugural performance was held at the DTE Energy Music Theatre in Clarkston, Michigan.
