= What Are Records? =

- Founded: 1991
- Founder: Rob Gordon
- Distributor: Select-O-Hits
- Genre: Various
- Country of origin: U.S.
- Location: Boulder, Colorado
- Official website: whatarerecords.com

What Are Records? (or W.A.R.?) is an independent record label located in Boulder, Colorado. Founded in New York City in 1991 by owner Rob Gordon, former director of A&R at EMI, the company moved to Boulder in 1994.

W.A.R.? has released over 100 records by Frank Black (of The Pixies), Bill Burr, Stephen Lynch, The Samples, Maceo Parker, Melissa Ferrick, and The Whitest Kids U' Know.

== History ==
What Are Records? was founded in Gordon's New York City loft in 1991. From the beginning, it fostered a direct-to-stores and direct-to-consumers distribution strategy. Friend of Gordon and The Samples then-manager, Ted Guggenheim, urged W.A.R.? to sign The Samples and they soon were among the first signings to the label. Other early acts included comedian Stephen Lynch, funk saxophone legend Maceo Parker (known for having played in James Brown’s band), former Squeeze frontman Glen Tilbrook, Grammy and Tony-nominated composer and piano man David Yazbek, singer-songwriter David Wilcox, and singer-songwriter Melissa Ferrick.

Gordon relocated the company to Boulder in 1991 and has been operating out of the offices designed by architect Charles Haertling ever since.

== Current artists ==
- Stephen Lynch
- The Whitest Kids U' Know
- Trace Bundy

== Catalog artists ==
- Bill Burr
- Between The Lines
- Cycomotogoat
- Daniel MacKenzie
- David Wilcox
- Everything
- Fancey
- Felicia Michaels
- Figurine
- Flickerstick
- Frank Black
- Glenn Tilbrook
- Hazard
- House of Large Sizes
- The Innocence Mission
- Jeep
- Joseph Brenna
- Le Concorde
- Lir
- Lloyd Cole
- Luce
- Maceo Parker
- Melissa Ferrick
- Munly
- The Ocean Blue
- The Poppy Family
- Primitive Radio Gods
- The Radiators
- Sally Taylor
- The Samples
- Sean Kelly
- Stuart Matthewman
- Sungha Jung
- The Swayback
- 24-7 Spyz
- Tim Finn
- Tony Furtado
- Ugly Americans
