= Natalie Merchant discography =

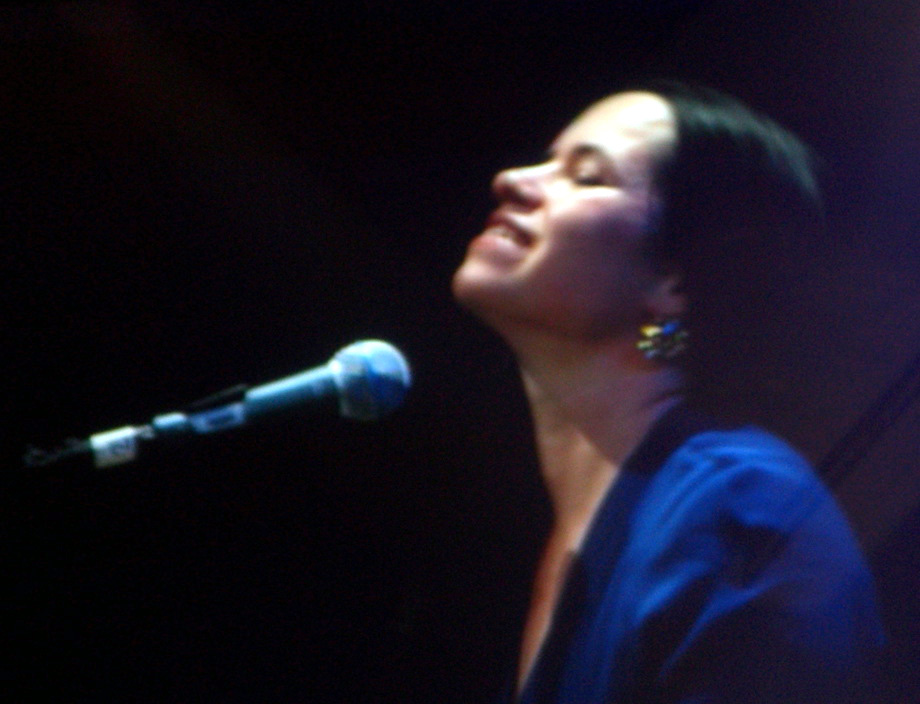
- Merchant performing
- Studio albums: 9
- Compilation albums: 2
- Singles: 11

The discography of Natalie Merchant contains nine studio albums, two compilation albums, and seven singles. Merchant's debut album, Tigerlily, produced three top 10 hits, "Carnival", "Wonder", and "Jealousy". The album is certified 5× Multi-Platinum by the RIAA.

== Albums ==
=== Studio albums ===
Year	Album details	Peak chart positions						Certifications and sales
Year	Album details	US	US Rock	US Folk	AUS	NZ	UK	Certifications and sales
1995	Tigerlily: Released: June 20, 1995; Label: Elektra	13	—	—	18	14	39	RIAA: 5× Platinum; ARIA: Gold; BPI: Silver; MC: Gold
1998	Ophelia: Released: May 19, 1998; Label: Elektra	8	—	—	56	26	52	RIAA: Platinum; MC: Gold
2001	Motherland: Released: November 13, 2001; Label: Elektra	30	—	—	83	11	102	RIAA: Gold
2003	The House Carpenter's Daughter: Released: September 16, 2003; Label: Myth America	—	—	—	124	—	—	
2010	Leave Your Sleep: Released: April 9, 2010; Label: Nonesuch	17	5	1	168	30	46	Worldwide: 200,000
2014	Natalie Merchant: Released: May 6, 2014; Label: Nonesuch	20	5	2	87	—	34	US: 44,000
2015	Paradise Is There: The New Tigerlily Recordings: Released: November 6, 2015; Label: Nonesuch	96	—	5	—	—	—	
2017	Butterfly: Released: 2017; Label: Nonesuch	—	—	—	—	—	—	
2023	Keep Your Courage: Released: April 14, 2023; Label: Nonesuch	—	—	—	—	—	58	
2026	A Cabinet of Wonder: Released: August 21, 2026; Label: Nonesuch	—	—	—	—	—	–	
"—" denotes releases that did not chart

=== Live albums ===
Year	Album details	Peak positions
Year	Album details	US
1999	Live in Concert: Released: November 9, 1999; Label: Elektra	82

=== Compilation albums ===
Year	Album details
2005	Retrospective: 1995–2005: Released: September 27, 2005; Label: Elektra
2017	Rarities (1998–2017): Released: July 14, 2017; Label: Nonesuch

== Extended plays ==
Year	EP details	Peak positions	
Year	EP details	US	US Rock
2010	iTunes Sessions: Released: July 27, 2010; Label: Myth America	103	31

== Singles ==
Year	Single	Peak chart positions								Album
Year	Single	US	US Adult	US AC	US Pop	US Alt	AUS	NZ	UK	Album
1995	"Carnival"	10	8	8	6	12	24	—	147	Tigerlily
1995	"Wonder"	20	2	18	7	16	71	—	96	Tigerlily
1996	"Jealousy"	23	5	17	8	—	—	40	—	Tigerlily
1998	"Kind & Generous"	18^{[A]}	3	—	15	32	—	—	—	Ophelia
1998	"Break Your Heart"	—	24	—	—	—	—	—	124	Ophelia
1999	"Life Is Sweet"	—	12	—	—	—	—	—	—	Ophelia
2001	"Just Can't Last"	—	30	—	—	—	—	—	—	Motherland
2002	"Build a Levee"	—	—	—	—	—	—	—	—	Motherland
2002	"Tell Yourself"	—	—	—	—	—	—	—	—	Motherland
2010	"Topsyturvey-World"	—	—	—	—	26^{[B]}	—	—	—	Leave Your Sleep
2014	"Ladybird"	—	—	—	—	—	—	—	—	Natalie Merchant
"—" denotes releases that did not chart

- A. Charted only on the Hot 100 Airplay chart.
- B. Charted on the Adult Alternative Songs chart.

== Other appearances ==
Year	Song	Album
1993	"Photograph" (with R.E.M.)	Born to Choose
1996	"Come Take a Trip in My Starship"	For Our Children Too
1997	"Children, Go Where I Send Thee"	A Very Special Christmas 3
1998	"Birds and Ships"	Mermaid Avenue
1998	"Way Over Yonder in the Minor Key"	Mermaid Avenue
1998	"But Not for Me" (featuring Chris Botti)	Red Hot + Rhapsody: The Gershwin Groove
2000	"I Was Born"	Mermaid Avenue Vol. II
2011	"Child of a Blind Man"	Cicada
2011	"Learning the Game"	Listen to Me: Buddy Holly
2017	"The Butcher's Boy" & "Johnny Has Gone For A Soldier"	Folk Songs
