= Retrospective: 1995–2005 =

Greatest hits album by Natalie Merchant
- Released: 27 September 2005
- Recorded: 1990–2005
- Genre: Pop
- Length: 126:28
- Label: Elektra; Warner Strategic Marketing
- Producer: Natalie Merchant

Natalie Merchant chronology
| The House Carpenter's Daughter (2003) | Retrospective: 1995–2005 (2005) | Leave Your Sleep (2010) |

Retrospective: 1995–2005 is Natalie Merchant's first greatest hits album, featuring her most popular songs. It was released on 27 September 2005 on Elektra Records. It was rated 4.5 stars by AllMusic.

== Track listing ==
1. "Wonder" (single version) – 4:24
2. "Carnival" – 5:59
3. "Jealousy" (single version) – 2:44
4. "San Andreas Fault" – 3:58
5. "Kind & Generous" – 4:06
6. "Break Your Heart" – 4:53
7. "Life is Sweet" – 5:14
8. "The Living" – 3:18
9. "Build a Levee" – 4:48
10. "Not in This Life" – 5:22
11. "Motherland" – 4:45
12. "Owensboro" – 4:25
13. "Sally Ann" – 5:49

A Special Deluxe Edition of Retrospective: 1990–2005 was available for a limited time from Merchant's website. This version included a second disc with B-sides and rarities:

1. "She Devil" (outtake from Ophelia) – 5:55
2. "Cowboy Romance" (outtake from The House Carpenter's Daughter) – 8:02
3. "Children Go Where I Send Thee" – 5:12
4. "Birds and Ships" (with Billy Bragg) – 2:13
5. "The Lowlands of Holland" (with The Chieftains) – 3:49
6. "One Fine Day" (from the movie One Fine Day) – 2:47
7. "Photograph" (with R.E.M.) – 3:32
8. "Party of God" (with Bragg) – 4:17
9. "Thick as Thieves" (acoustic version) – 6:23
10. "Bread and Circuses" (with Bragg) – 4:24
11. "Because I Could Not Stop for Death" (with Susan McKeown) – 3:50
12. "Tell Yourself" (acoustic version) – 5:05
13. "But Not for Me" – 3:26
14. "I Know How to Do It" – 4:26
15. "Come Take a Trip in My Airship" – 4:03
