= Rarities (1998–2017) =

Compilation album by Natalie Merchant
- Released: 2017
- Genre: Alternative rock; folk
- Label: Nonesuch

Natalie Merchant chronology
Butterfly (2017)	Rarities (1998–2017) (2017)	Keep Your Courage (2023)

Rarities (1998–2017) is a compilation album by American singer-songwriter Natalie Merchant. Originally released in 2017 as part of the ten-disc box set The Natalie Merchant Collection, it was released to digital platforms and streaming services by Nonesuch Records on June 26, 2020. The album consists of lesser known and previously unreleased songs recorded by Merchant spanning from 1998 to 2017.

== Track listing ==
All tracks are written by Natalie Merchant except where noted otherwise.

No.	Title	Writer(s)	Length
1.	"The Village Green Preservation Society"	Ray Davies	3:22
2.	"Too Long at the Fair"	Joel Zoss	3:20
3.	"Order 1081"	David Byrne	5:48
4.	"To Love Is to Bury"	Michael Timmins; Margo Timmins	3:32
5.	"Saint Judas"		3:46
6.	"Birds & Ships"	Woody Guthrie	2:12
7.	"The Lowlands of Holland" (Traditional; arranged by Paddy Maloney)		3:48
8.	"Sonnet 73" (Poem by William Shakespeare; arranged by Merchant)		4:12
9.	"Learning the Game"	Buddy Holly	3:27
10.	"My Little Sweet Baby" (Traditional)		2:28
11.	"Political Science"	Randy Newman	2:48
12.	"Build a Levee"		4:43
13.	"Sit Down Sister" (Traditional)		1:36
14.	"The Gulf of Araby"	Katell Keineg	7:10
15.	"Portofino"		1:54
