= Wonder (soundtrack) =

Wonder (Original Soundtrack Album)

Soundtrack album by Marcelo Zarvos
- Released: November 17, 2017
- Recorded: 2017
- Studio: Igloo Music Studios, Burbank, California; Sphere Studios, Burbank, California; St. Thomas Chapel, Seattle, Washington D.C.
- Genre: Film score
- Length: 55:10
- Label: Milan
- Producer: Alexandra Patsavas; Marcelo Zarvos; Stephen Chbosky

Alexandre Desplat chronology
| Civil (2017) | Wonder (2017) | The Land of Steady Habits (2018) |

Wonder (Original Soundtrack Album) is the soundtrack album to the 2017 film Wonder directed by Stephen Chbosky based on the 2012 novel by R. J. Palacio and starring Julia Roberts, Owen Wilson, Jacob Tremblay, Mandy Patinkin, and Daveed Diggs. The soundtrack is produced by Alexandra Patsavas, Zarvos and Chbosky, and released through Milan Records on November 17, 2017.

== Background ==
The film score is composed by Marcelo Zarvos, who recalled in an interview with Zach Laws of GoldDerby that he cried while watching the film for the first time, owing to its emotional undertone and wanted to capture the spirit of Auggie Pullman in "the most profound yet childlike way." While working on Wonder, Zarvos recalled that he did not do films that fit for a family-viewing experience and Wonder was the first film he did which he could watch with his kids, hence the soundscape was much different. Zarvos and Chbosky had worked extensively to find the framework of the sounds, and they experimented a lot and "everything ultimately needed to feel like a song to [Chbosky], like it was a perfect little melody."

Bea Miller composed a song "Brand New Eyes" for the film, which was released as a single on August 4, 2017, through Hollywood Records. The soundtrack to the film also included a compilation of songs curated by Alexandra Patsavas, notably included the Natalie Merchant song "Wonder" (1995), that inspired Palacio to write the novel. It also featured songs from the White Stripes, Bobby Pickett and the Crypt-Kickers, Butterfly Boucher, Caroline Pennell, Passion Pit and Hannah Faye. Milan Records released the soundtrack on November 17, 2017, alongside the film.

== Reception ==
David Edelstein of Vulture wrote "a piano-heavy score by Marcelo Zarvos that is sometimes perfect and sometimes too plaintive". Screen International and Sheri Linden of The Hollywood Reporter called it "emotional" and "moving". Richard Propes of The Independent Critic wrote "Marcelo Zarvos's original music never hits a false note". Gill Harris of Swindon Advertiser noted that Zarvos' score "shamelessly pluck at our heartstrings". Courtney Howard of Fresh Fiction wrote "Marcelo Zarvos' score, while lovely, does overstay its welcome, pushing you into "the feels" when the narrative already has you there."

== Track listing ==
| No. | Title | Artist(s) | Length |
|---|---|---|---|
| 1. | "We're Going to Be Friends" | The White Stripes | 2:21 |
| 2. | "Ordinary Kid" | | 4:23 |
| 3. | "The First Day" | | 2:34 |
| 4. | "Darker" | Hannah Faye | 2:56 |
| 5. | "Shoes" | | 1:38 |
| 6. | "Class Photo" | | 3:51 |
| 7. | "Pop Quiz" | | 1:33 |
| 8. | "Halloween" | | 1:18 |
| 9. | "Monster Mash" | Bobby Pickett and the Crypt-Kickers | 3:12 |
| 10. | "Winter" | | 3:29 |
| 11. | "Via" | | 1:30 |
| 12. | "Coney Island" | | 1:29 |
| 13. | "Break the Rules" | Butterfly Boucher | 1:59 |
| 14. | "The Other First Day" | | 1:17 |
| 15. | "Letters" | | 1:22 |
| 16. | "Spring" | | 1:20 |
| 17. | "We're Going to Be Friends" | Caroline Pennell | 3:01 |
| 18. | "Camera Obscura" | | 1:35 |
| 19. | "Graduation" | | 1:00 |
| 20. | "Moth's Wings" | Passion Pit | 4:16 |
| 21. | "Wonder" | Natalie Merchant | 4:26 |
| Total length: | | | 50:30 |

== Personnel ==
Credits adapted from liner notes:

- Score composer, producer and piano – Marcelo Zarvos
- Album producer – Alexandra Patsavas, Marcelo Zarvos, Stephen Chbosky
- Score editor – Erica Weis
- Technical score engineer – Edward Barton, Gregory Polzak
- Assistant engineer – Justin Moshkevich
- Recording and mixing – Gustavo Borner
- Recordist – Kory Kruckenberg
- Orchestrator – Douglas Gibson, Mark Baechle, Philip Rothman
- Orchestra conductor and contractor – David Sabee
- Musical assistance – Ariel Marx
- Production manager – Pablo Manyer
- Copyist – Robert Puff
- Graphic design and layout – Shawn Lyon
- Executive producer (Milan Records) – JC Chamboredon, Stefan Karrer
- Executive director for music business affairs (Lionsgate) – Raha Johartchi
- Coordinator of music business affairs (Lionsgate) – Jessica Villar
- General manager and executive vice president for music business affairs (Lionsgate) – Lenny Wohl
- Executive in charge of music (Lionsgate) – Amy Dunning
- Manager of film music (Lionsgate) – Lilly Reid, Ryan Svendsen
- Music finance executive (Lionsgate) – Chris Brown
