= OPLL =

OPLL may refer to:

- Ossification of the posterior longitudinal ligament
- Yamaha YM2413
