= Johnny Has Gone for a Soldier =

Song

"Johnny Has Gone for a Soldier" is an Irish folk song. The lyrics lament the sacrifices that men and women make in going off to war. Men would help by going off to war and women would help by sacrificing men and selling goods to buy military supplies. This folk song was popular throughout the American Revolutionary War. Although its meaning is known, its history is not.

== Origins ==
The tune and lyrics are very similar to the 17th century Irish tune "Siúil A Rún" on which the song is based.

== Known versions ==
- Peter, Paul, and Mary used the first and third verses of the song in the arranged song "Gone the Rainbow" from their second album Moving (1963).
- American folk singer-songwriter Pete Seeger did a cover version available on his album American Favorite Ballads, Vol. 4.
- The gothic rock band Mors Syphilitica did a version for their album Primrose (1998) performed by Lisa Hammer.
- American singer-songwriter and guitarist James Taylor and American violinist Mark O'Connor collaborated on a version together on the album Heartland: An Appalachian Anthology. A video rendition of their recording was played at the end of each episode of the PBS series Liberty! The American Revolution.
- Canadian singer-songwriter Old Man Luedecke recorded a version of the song for his album Proof of Love
- A version of the song was made for British TV series Sharpe
- The Kronos Quartet and Natalie Merchant perform a version of this song on Kronos Quartet - Folk Songs

== In popular culture ==
The song is heard several times in Ken Burns's 1989 documentary film The Civil War. It is performed by pianist Jacqueline Schwab and recorder player Jesse Carr.

The tune is also sung by actor John Tams' character Hagman in the 1995 TV series, Sharpe, in the episode, Sharpe's Battle.
