= Keep Your Courage =

Studio album by Natalie Merchant
- Released: April 14, 2023
- Recorded: 2019–2022
- Studios: Guilford Sound, Guilford, Vermont, United States
- Genres: Americana; baroque pop
- Length: 54:38
- Language: English
- Label: Nonesuch
- Producer: Natalie Merchant

Natalie Merchant chronology
Butterfly (2017)	Keep Your Courage (2023)	Cabinet of Wonder (2026)

Singles from Keep Your Courage
- 1. "Come On, Aphrodite" Released: February 15, 2023; 2. "Tower of Babel" Released: March 30, 2023; 3. "Big Girls" Released: April 18, 2023

Keep Your Courage is the eighth studio album by American singer-songwriter Natalie Merchant, released on April 14, 2023, by Nonesuch Records. It is her first full-length studio album since 2014's Natalie Merchant and Merchant also promoted the release with a tour, accompanied on some dates by a symphony orchestra. The album has received positive reviews, but faced criticism for its tone and length.

== Composition and recording ==
After several years of focusing on being a single mother, Merchant returned to songwriting as an emotional outlet, composing songs for Keep Your Courage beginning in late 2020 or early 2021. These represented the first songs that Merchant had written in six years. The album is a song cycle built around the concept of having a courageous heart, and is a concept album composed entirely of love songs, which Merchant was inspired to write after having surgery for ossification of the posterior longitudinal ligament as well as an anaplasmosis infection that led to sepsis and experiencing healing from love and care by others. Lyrics discuss feelings of isolation that she had during the COVID-19 pandemic and the album also explores political themes and feminism and womanhood. Many of the songs are written about or to fictional or mythological characters, which is a songwriting tool that Merchant uses to approach contemporary issues. She also read mythology during the pandemic, as it felt like a mythological event to her.

In-studio recordings only featured up to five persons at a time due to COVID restrictions, so the resulting music was made with layering recordings. The cover is a photograph of a statue of Joan of Arc that Merchant had found many years prior and kept.

== Release and promotion ==
I was raising my daughter, and I'm a single mom... My days are so full that it never occurred to me that I should sit down and write a song. I was just focused on so many other things. It's an indulgence to sit down with the piano and sing. It got to the point where I forgot that I was a songwriter, or that I could write songs.

— Merchant on her extended absence from performing, recording, and songwriting, leading up to Keep Your Courage and its subsequent tour

Two singles preceded the album's release: "Come On, Aphrodite" on February 15, 2023, and "Tower of Babel" on March 30, 2023. Merchant participated in a promotion with Uncut to answer fans' questions that ran in the June 2023 issue. She also hosted a set on WDST, Radio Woodstock on April 15. On April 18, 2023, Merchant released a third single off of the album, "Big Girls".

Merchant withheld the release for almost a year in order to safely tour around the COVID-19 pandemic. Beginning in May 2022, Merchant took the music from this album and prepared it for an orchestral arrangement. The promotional tour was her first long-term tour in almost a decade and found Merchant accompanied by a string quartet on all dates. Merchant also performed on Good Morning America on June 20.

In the table below, entries with an asterism (⁂) feature an orchestra.

Tour dates to support Keep Your Courage
Date	City	Country	Venue	Accompaniment
April 14, 2023	Poughkeepsie, New York	United States of America	Bardavon 1869 Opera House	—N/a
April 15, 2023	Poughkeepsie, New York	United States of America	Bardavon 1869 Opera House	—N/a
April 18, 2023	Pittsburgh, Pennsylvania	United States of America	Byham Theater	—N/a
April 19, 2023	Charlottesville, Virginia	United States of America	Paramount Theater	—N/a
April 21, 2023	Philadelphia, Pennsylvania	United States of America	Kimmel Cultural Campus	—N/a
April 22, 2023	Hershey, Pennsylvania	United States of America	Hershey Theatre	—N/a
April 24, 2023	Greenville, South Carolina	United States of America	Peace Center Concert Hall	—N/a
April 26, 2023	Clearwater, Florida	United States of America	Ruth Eckerd Hall	—N/a
April 27, 2023⁂	Fort Lauderdale, Florida	United States of America	Au-Rene Theater at Broward Center for the Performing Arts	South Florida Symphony Orchestra
April 28, 2023	St. Augustine, Florida	United States of America	St. Augustine Amphitheatre	—N/a
April 30, 2023⁂	Atlanta, Georgia	United States of America	Atlanta Symphony Hall	Atlanta Symphony Orchestra
May 9, 2023	Portland, Maine	United States of America	Merrill Auditorium	—N/a
May 10, 2023	Boston, Massachusetts	United States of America	Emerson Colonial Theatre	—N/a
May 11, 2023	Boston, Massachusetts	United States of America	Emerson Colonial Theatre	—N/a
May 13, 2023	Cleveland, Ohio	United States of America	KeyBank State Theatre	—N/a
May 14, 2023	Cincinnati, Ohio	United States of America	Taft Theatre	—N/a
May 16, 2023	Carmel, Indiana	United States of America	The Palladium at the Center for the Performing Arts	—N/a
May 17, 2023	Ann Arbor, Michigan	United States of America	Michigan Theater	—N/a
May 19, 2023	Chicago, Illinois	United States of America	The Chicago Theatre	—N/a
May 20, 2023	Milwaukee, Wisconsin	United States of America	Pabst Theater	—N/a
June 2, 2023⁂	New York City, New York	United States of America	Alice Tully Hall, Lincoln Center	The Knights
June 3, 2023⁂	New York City, New York	United States of America	Alice Tully Hall, Lincoln Center	The Knights
June 22, 2023⁂	St. Louis, Missouri	United States of America	Stifel Theatre	St. Louis Symphony Orchestra
June 25, 2023⁂	Newark, New Jersey	United States of America	NJPAC	Orchestra of St. Luke's
June 28, 2023⁂	Providence, Rhode Island	United States of America	Veterans Memorial Auditorium	Rhode Island Philharmonic Orchestra
June 30, 2023⁂	Washington, D. C.	United States of America	John F. Kennedy Center for the Performing Arts	National Symphony Orchestra
July 1, 2023⁂	Washington, D. C.	United States of America	John F. Kennedy Center for the Performing Arts	National Symphony Orchestra
July 8, 2023⁂	Chautauqua, New York	United States of America	Chautauqua Institution Amphitheater	Chautauqua Symphony Orchestra
September 20, 2023	Spokane, Washington	United States of America	Martin Woldson Theater at The Fox	—N/a
September 22, 2023	Woodinville, Washington	United States of America	Chateau Ste. Michelle Winery	—N/a
September 23, 2023	Portland, Oregon	United States of America	Keller Auditorium	—N/a
September 26, 2023	San Francisco, California	United States of America	The Masonic	—N/a
September 27, 2023	Saratoga, California	United States of America	The Mountain Winery	—N/a
September 29, 2023	San Diego, California	United States of America	Humphrey's Concerts by the Bay	—N/a
September 30, 2023	Los Angeles, California	United States of America	Walt Disney Concert Hall	—N/a
October 31, 2023	Berlin	Germany	Theater des Westens	—N/a
November 2, 2023	London, England	United Kingdom	London Palladium	—N/a
November 3, 2023	London, England	United Kingdom	London Palladium	—N/a
November 5, 2023	Glasgow, Scotland	United Kingdom	Glasgow Royal Concert Hall	—N/a
November 6, 2023	Manchester, England	United Kingdom	O2 Apollo Manchester	—N/a
November 8, 2023	Dublin	Ireland	3Olympia	—N/a
November 11, 2023	Bath, England	United Kingdom	The Forum	—N/a
November 13, 2023	Amsterdam	The Netherlands	Carré Theatre	—N/a
November 14, 2023	Brussels	Belgium	Cirque Royal	—N/a

== Reception ==
Keep Your Courage received positive reviews from critics noted at review aggregator Metacritic. It has a weighted average score of 78 out of 100, based on seven reviews. In No Depression, Jim Shahen characterizes this release as "full of ambitious musical passages, thoughtful lyrics, and fantastic vocal performances centered on the need for love and meaningful human connection". PopMatters' Steve Horowitz rated Keep Your Courage a seven out of 10, noting an "alchemy" between the musicians and styles, but critiquing that Merchant "would be better if Merchant lightened up a bit... She would be more honest if she were funnier, and this would make her morals easier to digest." Tom Dunne of The Irish Examiner listed this as one of his six favorite albums of the year so far in mid-April 2023. John Murphy of musicOMH gave the album three out of five stars, praising individual tracks, but noting that "there are a couple of tracks that veer towards the forgettable, and the overall downbeat tempo of the album as a whole may test the patience of some listeners". In The Daily Telegraph, Neil McCormick rated this album four out of five stars, praising "the cohesive, eternal quality of Merchant's ability to weave romantic, folk-rock ballads rich with organ, brass, and tidal waves of strings all anchored to simple piano melodies". Editors at AllMusic Guide scored this release four out of five stars, with critic Stephen Thomas Erlewine praising the music for "celebrat[ing] compassion, empathy, and inspiration" while being "stately and sober", with "Merchant's inherently warm, empathetic voice keep[ing] the album from seeming still in its quiet moments". Graham Reid of The New Zealand Herald included this in his favorite albums of 2023. Editors at AllMusic included this among their favorite singer-songwriter music albums of 2023.

== Track listing ==
All songs written by Natalie Merchant, except where noted

1. "Big Girls" – 4:56
2. "Come On, Aphrodite" – 5:21
3. "Sister Tilly" – 7:42
4. "Narcissus" – 6:02
5. "Hunting the Wren" (Ian Lynch) – 5:47
6. "Guardian Angel" – 5:56
7. "Eye of the Storm" – 5:30
8. "Tower of Babel" – 2:28
9. "Song of Himself" – 4:51
10. "The Feast of Saint Valentine" – 6:06

Vinyl edition bonus tracks

11. "Spring & Fall: To a Young Child" – 3:03 (from Leave Your Sleep, 2010)
12. "Butterfly" – 5:39 (from Butterfly, 2017)
13. "Giving Up Everything" – 4:20 (from Natalie Merchant, 2014)
14. "Frozen Charlotte" – 5:58 (from Butterfly, 2017)

== Personnel ==
- Natalie Merchant – vocals, production, liner notes, design
- Abena Koomson-Davis - vocals
- Carmen Staaf - grand piano, Rhodes piano, mellotron, Hammond organ
- Erik Della Penna - acoustic guitar, electric guitar, 12-string acoustic guitar, classical guitar
- Mike Rivard - electric bass, upright bass
- Allison Miller – drums and percussion
- Marandi Hostetter - violin
- Megan Gould - violin, orchestration, string arrangements, conducting
- Dana Lyn - viola
- Eleanor Norton - cello
- Tony Kadleck - trumpet
- Kris Jensen - tenor saxophone, baritone saxophone
- Alex Sopp - alto flute
- Andrew Price - Oboe
- Clark Matthews - French horn
- Joseph Foley - trumpet, flugelhorn
- Angel Subero - trombone, bass trombone
- Kinan Azmeh – clarinet
- Matt Mancuso - fiddle
- Sandra Park - violin
- Ann Lehmann - violin
- Arnaud Sussmann - violin
- Minyoung Baik - violin
- Matt Lehmann - violin
- Shan Jiang - violin
- Robert Rinehart - viola
- Karen Dreyfus - viola
- Eileen Moon - cello
- Jeanne LeBlanc - cello
- Jeremy McCoy - bass, double bass
- Sherry Sylar - oboe
- Marc Goldberg - bassoon
- Lino Gomez - bass clarinet
- Phil Myers - French horn
- Michelle Baker - French horn
- Erik Ralske - French horn
- Howard Wall - French horn
- Mike Davis - tenor trombone
- Birch Johnson - tenor trombone
- George Flynn - bass trombone
- Kyle Turner - tuba
- Erik Charlston - percussion
- Ina Zdorovetchi - harp
- Uri Sharlin - grand piano
- Logan Coale - acoustic bass
- Scott Moore - viola
- Gabriel Gordon - electric guitar
- Jesse Murphy - electric bass
- Shawn Pelton - drums
- Johanna Warren - vocals
- Elizabeth Mitchell - vocals
- Sharon Yamada - violin
- Quan Ge - violin
- Joanna Maurer - violin
- Sein Ryu - violin
- Kyle Armbrust - viola
- Alan Stepansky - cello
- Ru Pie Yeh - cello
- Kurt Muroki - double bass
- Noah Hoffeld - cello
- Stephen Barber – string arrangement
- Steve Davis – trombone, horn arrangement
- Colin Jacobsen – orchestration
- David Spear - orchestration
- Gabriel Kahane –orchestration
- Sean O'Loughlin - orchestration
- John Mills - horn arrangement
- Nadége Foofat & Tony Finno - string arrangement
- Lúnasa
  - Ed Boyd – guitar
  - Kevin Crawford – flutes, whistles
  - Patrick Doocey – guitar
  - Colin Farrell – fiddle, whistles
  - Trevor Hutchinson – double bass
  - Seán Smyth – fiddle, whistles
  - Cillian Vallely – Uilleann pipes, whistles
- Kim Rosen – mastering at Knack Mastering, Ringwood, New Jersey, United States
- Anabel Sinn – design
- Dave Snyder – engineering
- Ryan Freeland – mixing at Stampede Origin, Culver City, California, United States
- Matt Hall – assistant engineering
- Andrea Camuto – portrait photography

== Chart performance ==
Note: Keep Your Courage debuted on the mid-week UK Albums Chart at 14, but ended up placing 58 when the chart was published.

Chart performance for Keep Your Courage
Chart	Peak	Duration (weeks)
Belgian Albums (Ultratop Flanders)	73	2
Dutch Albums (Album Top 100)	26	1
German Albums (Offizielle Top 100)	32	1
Hungarian Albums (MAHASZ)	7	2
Scottish Albums (Official Charts)	5	2
Swiss Albums (Schweizer Hitparade)	45	1
UK Albums (Official Charts)	58	1

== See also ==
- 2023 in American music
- List of 2023 albums
