= Katell Keineg =

Breton-Welsh singer

Katell Keineg (born February 1965) is a Breton-Welsh singer-songwriter, based in Wales.

== Early life ==
Born in Brittany and raised first there and later in the Rhymney Valley, Katell Keineg is the second child and only daughter of Breton poet and playwright Paol Keineg and his then wife, Judith Pritchard (née Gurney), a Welsh political activist.

Both parents were active in their nations' respective autonomy movements, Judith with Plaid Cymru, Paol with the UDB. The family moved to Wales where, exposed to Breton and Welsh folk music, Katell began singing, mainly in choirs and eisteddfodau. Early influences included The Beatles and Led Zeppelin.

She has cited the film, The Song Remains the Same as influential; she watched it in the same year she began busking in Cardiff, which led to travels around the United Kingdom and Ireland playing at ad hoc gigs and festivals.

Around 1988–90, she appeared in a number of episodes of the Welsh language soap-opera "Pobol Y Cwm", produced by BBC Wales for the Welsh fourth television channel, S4C. Her character, a Breton, instigated the twinning of the fictional Welsh village of "Cwmderi" with a town in Brittany.

After taking a law degree at the London School of Economics, she lived briefly in Cardiff and, at age 24, moved to Dublin. From the early 1990s onwards, Keineg travelled back and forth between Dublin and New York, where she made her first two albums for Elektra Records. She is now based in Wales.

== Ô Seasons Ô Castles ==
In the early 1990s she lived in New York for a time. A live appearance in Times Square was recorded by Irish TV in the summer of 1992, by which time she had become one of a number of regular performers at the, now defunct, Sin-é in lower Manhattan.

Her first release was a seven-inch single called "Hestia" on SOL, an independent label co-owned by musicians Bob Mould and Nicholas Hill. She was signed by Elektra in 1993 and in 1994 her debut album, Ô Seasons Ô Castles was released. One of the songs, "The Gulf of Araby", was played regularly by Natalie Merchant at concerts for several years and is featured on her live album Live in Concert, New York City – June 13th 1999. Merchant also invited Keineg to sing on her debut album, Tigerlily, on the song Carnival.

In 1993, Keineg sang on "Mixin' The Colors" from Iggy Pop's American Caesar album.

For the next two years she continued to gig regularly at festivals such as Roskilde, Crossing Border and Lilith Fair.

== Jet ==
Her second album, Jet, featured a biographical song about bisexual Argentine surrealist painter Leonor Fini.

In the same year, her friend Jeff Buckley drowned in the Mississippi River at age thirty. Katell sang at his memorial service.

Following disappointing sales of Jet and a change of management at Elektra, Keineg endured a number of unhappy years at Elektra during which time she released no new music. Eventually she was able to secure a release from her contract with Elektra and to gain back rights to her first two albums. Having been out of print for a while, Ô Seasons Ô Castles and Jet were re-released on the Field Recording Co label in 2002.

== What's The Only Thing Worse Than The End of Time? and High July ==
Also in 2002, Katell released a four-track EP titled What's The Only Thing Worse Than The End of Time? which more than marked a return to form. It consisted of the title track, a live version of Nick Drake's "River Man" sung at a Nick Drake tribute at St. Ann's Church in Manhattan, "Waiting For the Weight of Space" and "Beautiful Day".

It was followed in 2004 by her third album, High July, released via the independent label Megaphone Music and later re-released on Keineg's own STZ label. A re-recorded version of "On Yer Way" from that album was used over the credits of Deborah Kampmeier's indie film Virgin with Robin Wright released in 2003.

== Late 2000s work ==
A six-page, high-profile interview with Darcy Frey was published on 2 July 2006 in The New York Times Magazine and this sparked new interest in Keineg's music in the United States.

During the rest of 2006 and into 2007, Keineg played several sold out concerts in New York in the wake of the article, including a month-long Friday night residency at The Living Room in February 2007. Also in 2006, she toured Wales with Ann Scott and Adrian Crowley and appeared on S4C's Wedi Saith evening programme.

Mid-2007 was spent playing European classical music festivals with concert pianist Katia Labeque's experimental band, B For Bang, whose first album was released in January 2008 and included a version of The Beatles "I Want You (She's So Heavy)" sung by Keineg. She and Ann Scott played in Spain, Portugal and Norway during the course of that year and the next and started a joint recording project.

She released a 4-song EP in January 2009 that includes the re-recorded "On Yer Way", a Welsh language cover of the Super Furry Animals song "Y Gwyneb Iau" and "Trouble", an outtake from "Jet" re-mixed by Scott. Later that year Keineg played at Levon Helm's Midnight Ramble in Woodstock.

== 2010s and on ==
Keineg released At The Mermaid Parade, her fourth album, in spring 2010. It was released on STZ in North America and by Honest Jon's Records, Damon Albarn's label, in the rest of the world. The album was named "Album of the Week" in The Sunday Times. She toured in the UK and Ireland following the album's release, opening for singer-songwriter Krystle Warren and playing The Green Man festival.

In May 2012, Keineg released a download single in Welsh called "Platform 0" recorded in New York for the internet radio show Radio Free Song Club with their all-star house band.

== Singles ==
- "Hestia"
- "Partisan"
- "Franklin"
- "One Hell of a Life"
- "Smile"
- "What's The Only Thing Worse Than The End of Time"
- "Shaking The Disease"
- "Y Gwyneb Iau"
- "Platfform O"

== Sources ==
- Dream Brother: The Lives and Music of Jeff and Tim Buckley, David Browne, 2002. ISBN 978-0380806249
- Gimme Danger : The Story Of Iggy Pop, Joe Ambrose, 2008 ISBN 978-1847721167
- The Show I'll Never Forget, Sean Manning, Da Capo Press, 2007 ISBN 978-0306815089
- X Saves the World: How Generation X Got the Shaft But Can Still Keep Everything from Sucking, Jeff Gordinier, Penguin Books, 2009 ISBN 978-0143115151
