= Long Time Passing =

Long Time Passing: Kronos Quartet & Friends Celebrate Pete Seeger

Studio album by Kronos Quartet
- Released: October 9, 2020
- Recorded: September 2019 at Studio 9, The Porches Inn at Mass MoCA, North Adams, MA
- Genre: Folk music Classical Music
- Label: Smithsonian Folkways
- Producer: Kronos Quartet, Reshena Liao

Kronos Quartet chronology
Sun Rings (2019)	Long Time Passing: Kronos Quartet & Friends Celebrate Pete Seeger (2020)

Long Time Passing is a 2020 album by Kronos Quartet celebrating the music of Pete Seeger. The album was commissioned by the FreshGrass Foundation and released on the Smithsonian Folkways label. This release follows 2017's Folk Songs, which saw the Kronos Quartet teaming with a variety of folk musicians.

== Track listing ==
1. "Which Side Are You On?" – 2:22
2. "The President Sang Amazing Grace" – 3:56
3. "Raghupati Raghav Raja Ram" – 3:40
4. "Waist Deep in the Big Muddy" – 3:23
5. "Jarama Valley" – 3:18
6. "Garbage" – 3:06
7. "Storyteller" (Jacob Garchik) – 16:29
8. "Mbube" – 2:44
9. "If I Had a Hammer" – 2:07
10. "Where Have All the Flowers Gone?" – 4:03
11. "Step By Step" – 3:02
12. "Andajaleo" – 2:37
13. "Kisses Sweeter Than Wine" – 3:10
14. "Turn, Turn, Turn" – 3:57
15. "We Shall Overcome" – 5:09

== Personnel ==
Kronos Quartet

- Hank Dutt – viola
- David Harrington – violin
- John Sherba – violin
- Sunny Yang – cello

Friends

- Sam Amidon – vocals, banjo
- Maria Arnal – vocals
- Brian Carpenter – vocals
- Lee Knight – vocals, banjo
- Meklit Hadero – vocals
- Aoife O'Donovan – vocals

Production

- Kronos Quartet and Reshena Liao – producers
- Arrangements by Jacob Garchik
- Scott Fraser – engineering for Kronos Quartet
- Mixed by David Harrington and Zach Miley
- Additional mixing by John Kilgore
- Bob Ludwig – mastering at Gateway Mastering Studios, Portland, Maine, United States

== See also ==
- List of 2020 albums
