= Jet (album) =

Studio album by Katell Keineg
- Released: 1997
- Label: Elektra
- Producers: Katell Keineg, Eric Drew Feldman, John Holbrook

Katell Keineg chronology
Ô Seasons Ô Castles (1994)	Jet (1997)	What's the Only Thing Worse Than the End of Time? (2002)

Jet is the second album by the Welsh musician Katell Keineg, released in 1997. Jet was often written about in the context of adult album alternative albums by female musicians in the 1990s.

The first single was "One Hell of a Life", which was a hit on AAA radio. Keineg supported the album with a North American tour.

== Production ==
The album was produced by Keineg, Eric Drew Feldman, and John Holbrook. Keineg used lyre, hand drums, tamboura, and bouzouki on Jet. "Leonor", about Leonor Fini, used lyrics that were repurposed from an obituary of the artist.

== Critical reception ==
Professional ratings
Review scores
Source	Rating
AllMusic	4/5 stars
The Atlanta Journal-Constitution	B+
The Encyclopedia of Popular Music	4/5 stars
Knoxville News Sentinel	4/5 stars
Los Angeles Daily News	3/4 stars
MusicHound Rock: The Essential Album Guide	4/5 stars
The Province	4/4 stars
Spin	7/10

Salon wrote: "Given Keineg's talent for simple, acoustic songs, it's a shame that the band must play on—and then be remixed and reverbed and regurgitated until her lyrics are almost squelched of their soul." Spin determined that "the ember glow of Keineg's voice seduces in quiet gems." The Province thought that "Keineg's literate, worldly point of view is admirably matched musically by the aural landscapes and rhythm tracks."

The Los Angeles Daily News stated that Keineg "leaves the Celtic-inspired mysticism of her 1994 debut for a conventional rock 'n' roll sheen." The Atlanta Journal-Constitution deemed the album "the kind of dreamy pop you figured people forgot how to make after the 1960s." The Vancouver Sun concluded: "Part Zeppelin-esque rock, part languid whisper, Jet layers the sensibilities of a Bryan Ferry over PJ Harvey over Edith Piaf over Tom Waits." The New York Times included the album on its list of notable "underheard" albums of 1997.

AllMusic noted that "unexpected musical twists and turns and Keineg's lovely, breathy vocals make it difficult for the listener not to be drawn into this work." The Encyclopedia of Popular Music called Jet "an off-beat classic."

== Track listing ==
No.	Title	Length
1.	"The Battle of the Trees"
2.	"One Hell of a Life"
3.	"Smile"
4.	"Enzo ’96"
5.	"Olé, Conquistador"
6.	"Leonor"
7.	"Veni Vidi Vici (I Came, I Saw, I Conquered)"
8.	"Venus"
9.	"Mother's Map"
10.	"Marietta"
11.	"Hoping and Praying"
12.	"There You Go"
