= Live in Concert (Natalie Merchant album) =

Live In Concert

Live album by Natalie Merchant
- Released: November 9, 1999
- Recorded: 13 June 1999
- Venue: Neil Simon Theatre, NYC
- Genre: Rock; Pop
- Length: 60:00
- Label: Elektra
- Producer: Natalie Merchant

Natalie Merchant chronology
Ophelia (1998)	Live In Concert (1999)	Motherland (2001)

Professional ratings
Review scores
Source	Rating
AllMusic	link
Entertainment Weekly	B+ link
Q	link
Rolling Stone	link
Spin	(6/10) link

Live in Concert is a 1999 live album and DVD by Natalie Merchant. The album and DVD were recorded at the Neil Simon Theatre in New York City. The set list includes a rare cover of David Bowie's "Space Oddity". The U.S. release is HDCD encoded, but without "peak extension".

== Track listing ==
=== CD ===
All songs written by Natalie Merchant, except where noted.

1. "Wonder"
2. "San Andreas Fault"
3. "Beloved Wife"
4. "Space Oddity" (David Bowie)
5. "Carnival"
6. "Dust Bowl" (Merchant, Robert Buck)
7. "After the Gold Rush" (Neil Young)
8. "Gun Shy"
9. "The Gulf of Araby" (Katell Keineg)
10. "Ophelia"
11. "Seven Years"
12. "These Are Days" (Bonus track - Japan and Australia only)

=== DVD ===
1. "Life Is Sweet (partial)"
2. "Ophelia"
3. "Wonder"
4. "San Andreas Fault"
5. "Beloved Wife"
6. "Senor Don Gato"
7. "Space Oddity"
8. "Carnival"
9. "Break Your Heart"
10. "These Are Days"
11. "The Gulf of Araby"
12. "Waterbound"

== Personnel ==
Adapted from AllMusic.

- Natalie Merchant - vocals, piano
- Erik Della Penna - guitars
- Gabriel Gordon - guitars, backing vocals
- Peter Yanowitz - drums
- Graham Maby - bass
- Elizabeth Steen - keyboards
- Doug Stringer - percussion
- Susan McKeown - guest vocals
