= Just Can't Last =

2001 single by Natalie Merchant

Single by Natalie Merchant

from the album Motherland
- B-side: "Motherland"
- Released: September 24, 2001
- Length: 4:31 (album version); 3:56 (radio edit)
- Label: Elektra
- Songwriter: Natalie Merchant
- Producers: Natalie Merchant; T-Bone Burnett

Natalie Merchant singles chronology
"Life Is Sweet" (1999)	"Just Can't Last" (2001)	"Build a Levee" (2002)

"Just Can't Last" is the first single released from American singer-songwriter Natalie Merchant's third studio album, Motherland (2001). It was serviced to US radio on September 24, 2001, and was issued commercially in Australia on February 4, 2002. The single version includes more instruments and vocals than the original.

== Release ==
"Just Can't Last" was serviced to US hot adult contemporary radio on September 24, 2001. The song was also made available via RealAudio streaming on Elektra Records' official artist site. The song peaked at number three on the US Billboard Triple-A chart and number 30 on the Billboard Adult Top 40. In Australia, a CD single was issued on February 4, 2002, with album track "Motherland" as a B-side.

== Music video ==
In the "Just Can't Last" music video, directed by Liz Friedlander, Merchant comes into view and is standing in front of a white screen in a black dress. Throughout the video there are three crawls going across the screen trying to match up people's bodies. In the end, everyone's body matches up and the video ends with Merchant walking into the distance and fading out. The video utilizes the 3:56 single remix, rather than the longer album version of the song.

== Track listing ==
Australian CD single

1. "Just Can't Last" (radio edit)
2. "Just Can't Last" (album version)
3. "Motherland" (album version)

== Personnel ==
- Natalie Merchant – vocals
- Gabriel Grodon – electric guitar
- Allison Miller – drums, percussion
- Erik Della Penna – acoustic guitar
- Elizabeth Steen – organ

== Charts ==
=== Weekly charts ===
Chart (2001)	Peak position
US Adult Alternative Airplay (Billboard)	3
US Adult Pop Airplay (Billboard)	30

=== Year-end charts ===
Chart (2002)	Position
US Triple-A (Billboard)	46
