= Folk Songs (Kronos Quartet album) =

2017 studio album by Kronos Quartet

Studio album by Kronos Quartet with Sam Amidon, Olivia Chaney, Rhiannon Giddens, and Natalie Merchant
- Released: June 9, 2017
- Recorded: September 21–22, 2014 ("Last Kind Words" recorded June 6, 2016)
- Studio: Avatar Studios, New York City, New York, United States; Studio Trilogy, San Francisco, California, United States ("Last Kind Words")
- Genre: American folk music, Irish folk music
- Length: 39:34
- Language: English, French ("Montagne, que tu es haute")
- Label: Nonesuch
- Producer: Doug Petty

Kronos Quartet chronology
Alexandra Vrebalov: the Sea Ranch Songs (2016)	Folk Songs (2017)	Ladilikan (2017)

Sam Amidon chronology
The Following Mountain (2017)	Folk Songs (2017)	Fatal Flower Garden (A Tribute to Harry Smith) (2019)

Olivia Chaney chronology
The Longest River (2015)	Folk Songs (2017)	The Queen of Hearts (2017)

Rhiannon Giddens chronology
Freedom Highway (2017)	Folk Songs (2017)	There Is No Other (2019)

Natalie Merchant chronology
Paradise Is There: The New Tigerlily Recordings (2015)	Folk Songs (2017)	Butterfly (2017)

Folk Songs is a 2017 studio album by American string quartet Kronos Quartet, featuring classical and roots musicians Sam Amidon, Olivia Chaney, Rhiannon Giddens, and Natalie Merchant. It has received positive reviews from critics and was followed in 2020 by Long Time Passing, a collection of Pete Seeger songs by the Kronos Quartet.

== Reception ==
Folk Songs received positive reviews from critics noted at review aggregator Metacritic. It has a weighted average score of 72 out of 100, based on four reviews. The editors of AllMusic Guide gave Folk Songs four out of five stars, with critic Mark Deming highlighting the arrangement and the quartet's ability to complement the vocalists. In Exclaim!, Peter Ellman rated this album a seven out of 10 for having versatility within the music, but criticizing that it "lingers a bit too much in a dark and dramatic mood".

== Track listing ==
1. "Oh Where" (traditional, arranged by Nico Muhly) – 3:22
2. "Ramblin' Boy" (traditional, arranged by Donnacha Dennehy) – 5:49
3. "The Butcher's Boy" (traditional, arranged by Jacob Garchik) – 3:58
4. "Factory Girl" (traditional and Rhiannon Giddens, arranged by Gabriel Witcher) – 7:11
5. "Last Kind Words" (Geeshie Wiley, arranged by Jacob Garchik) – 3:20
6. "I See the Sign" (traditional, arranged by Nico Muhly) – 6:04
7. "Montagne, que tu es haute" (traditional, arranged by Nico Muhly) – 2:32
8. "Johnny Has Gone for a Soldier" (traditional, arranged by Jacob Garchik) – 3:58
9. "Lullaby" (Rhiannon Giddens, arranged by Gabriel Witcher) – 3:36

== Personnel ==
Kronos Quartet

- Hank Dutt – viola
- David Harrington – violin, additional production
- John Sherba – violin
- Sunny Yang – cello

Guest musicians

- Sam Amidon – vocals on "Oh Where" and "I See the Sign", guitar on "Oh Where" and "I See the Sign"
- Olivia Chaney – vocals on "Rambling Boys of Pleasure" and "Montague, que tu es haute", harmonium on "Rambling Boys of Pleasure", percussion on "Montague, que tu es haute"
- Rhiannon Giddens – vocals on "Factory Girl" and "Lullaby"
- Natalie Merchant – vocals on "The Butcher's Boy" and "Johnny Has Gone for a Soldier"

Technical personnel

- Scott Fraser – mixing at Architecture, Los Angeles, California, United States
- Evan Gaffney – design
- Robert Hurwitz – executive production
- Bob Ludwig – mastering at Gateway Mastering Studios in Portland, Maine, United States
- Doug Petty – production
- Todd Whitelock – engineering

== See also ==
- List of 2017 albums
