= Kind & Generous =

1998 single by Natalie Merchant

Single by Natalie Merchant

from the album Ophelia
- B-side: "Frozen Charlotte"; "Wonder"
- Released: May 5, 1998
- Studio: Talking Dwarf (Little Valley, New York)
- Length: 4:07
- Label: Elektra
- Songwriter: Natalie Merchant
- Producer: Natalie Merchant

Natalie Merchant singles chronology
"Jealousy" (1996)	"Kind & Generous" (1998)	"Break Your Heart" (1998)

"Kind & Generous" is a song by American singer-songwriter Natalie Merchant, released as the first single from her second studio album, Ophelia (1998). It became a radio hit in the United States, peaking at number 18 on the Billboard Hot 100 Airplay chart as well as number one on the Billboard Triple-A chart. It also entered the top 20 in Canada, peaking at number 19 on the RPM 100 Hit Tracks chart.

== Music video ==
The music video made for this song features Natalie Merchant as part of a traveling circus and taking on many guises. The circus performers were actual performers from the local area and the little girl was the daughter of the proprietor-showperson.

== Track listing ==
European HDCD single and Australian CD single

1. "Kind & Generous" (LP version) – 4:05
2. "Frozen Charlotte" (LP version) – 5:25
3. "Wonder" (LP version) – 4:26

== Credits and personnel ==
Credits are lifted from the Ophelia liner notes.

Studios

- Recorded at Talking Dwarf Studios (Little Valley, New York)
- Mixed at Oceanway Recording Studios (Los Angeles)
- Mastered at Gateway Mastering Studios (Portland, Maine, US)

Personnel

- Natalie Merchant – writing, vocals
- Lokua Kanza – acoustic guitar
- Craig Ross – electric guitar
- Graham Maby – bass
- George Laks – Hammond, Wurlitzer
- Peter Yanowitz – drums
- Joakim Lartey – percussion
- Jim Scott – mixing
- Mike Scotella – mixing assistance
- Todd Vos – engineering
- Bob Ludwig – mastering

== Charts ==
=== Weekly charts ===
Chart (1998)	Peak position
Canada Top Singles (RPM)	19
Canada Adult Contemporary (RPM)	15
Canada Rock/Alternative (RPM)	21
US Radio Songs (Billboard)	18
US Adult Alternative Airplay (Billboard)	1
US Adult Pop Airplay (Billboard)	3
US Alternative Airplay (Billboard)	32
US Pop Airplay (Billboard)	15

=== Year-end charts ===
Chart (1998)	Position
Canada Top Singles (RPM)	63
Canada Adult Contemporary (RPM)	50
US Hot 100 Airplay (Billboard)	48
US Adult Top 40 (Billboard)	11
US Mainstream Top 40 (Billboard)	55
US Triple-A (Billboard)	3
