= The House Carpenter's Daughter =

Studio album by Natalie Merchant
- Released: September 16, 2003
- Recorded: July 2002 – May 2003
- Studio: Bearsville (Woodstock, New York)
- Genre: Folk
- Length: 50:39
- Label: Myth America Records
- Producer: Natalie Merchant

Natalie Merchant chronology
Motherland (2001)	The House Carpenter's Daughter (2003)	Retrospective: 1995-2005 (2005)

Professional ratings
Review scores
Source	Rating
AllMusic	4/5 stars
Mojo	3/5 stars
Rolling Stone	3/5 stars
Uncut	4/5 stars

The House Carpenter's Daughter is an acoustic album by Natalie Merchant. It consists of both traditional songs and cover versions of contemporary folk music. It was released on August 12, 2003 through her website and on September 16, 2003 in stores. It was produced by Merchant and released on Myth America Records, her independent label.

== Track listing ==
1. "Sally Ann" (Jeff Claus/Judy Hyman/Dirk Powell) – 5:47
2. "Which Side Are You On?" (Florence Reece) – 5:02
3. "Crazy Man Michael" (Richard Thompson/Dave Swarbrick) – 5:12
4. "Diver Boy" (traditional, arranged by Natalie Merchant) – 4:45
5. "Weeping Pilgrim" (traditional, arranged by Natalie Merchant) – 4:11
6. "Soldier, Soldier" (traditional, arranged by Natalie Merchant) – 3:43
7. "Bury Me under the Weeping Willow" (A. P. Carter) – 3:20
8. "House Carpenter" (traditional, arranged by Natalie Merchant) – 6:00
9. "Owensboro" (traditional, arranged by Natalie Merchant) – 4:21
10. "Down on Penny's Farm" (traditional, arranged by Natalie Merchant) – 3:41
11. "Poor Wayfaring Stranger" (traditional, arranged by Natalie Merchant) – 4:17

== Personnel ==
- Natalie Merchant – vocals
- Elizabeth Steen – acoustic piano, organ, accordion
- Erik Della Penna – guitars, lap steel guitar
- Gabriel Gordon – guitars
- Rich Stearns – banjo
- Graham Maby – bass guitar
- Allison Miller – drums
- Judy Hyman – fiddle
- The "Menfolk" – backing vocals

Production

- Natalie Merchant – producer, package design, collages
- George Cowan – engineer
- Todd Vos – engineer, mixing
- Emily Lazar – mastering at The Lodge (New York City, New York)
- Sarah Register – mastering assistant
- Mary Lynch – design assistance
- Daniel de la Calle – portraits

== Charts ==
Chart (2003/04)	Peak Position
Australian Albums (ARIA)	124
