= Paradise Is There: The New Tigerlily Recordings =

Studio album by Natalie Merchant
- Released: November 6, 2015
- Recorded: The Clubhouse, Rhinebeck, NY
- Length: 56:39
- Label: Nonesuch
- Producer: Natalie Merchant

Natalie Merchant chronology
Natalie Merchant (2014)	Paradise Is There: The New Tigerlily Recordings (2015)	Folk Songs (2017)

Paradise Is There: The New Tigerlily Recordings is the seventh studio album by American singer-songwriter Natalie Merchant, released on November 6, 2015 by Nonesuch Records. It is a collection of new recordings of the songs from Merchant's solo debut, Tigerlily (1995).

== Critical reception ==
Professional ratings
Aggregate scores
Source	Rating
Metacritic	78/100
Review scores
Source	Rating
AllMusic	4/5 stars
Entertainment Weekly	B
Mojo	4/5 stars
musicOMH	3/5 stars
Uncut	3.5/5 stars

Upon release, Paradise Is There: The New Tigerlily Recordings received positive acclaim from music critics. At Metacritic, which assigns a normalized rating out of 100 based on reviews from critics, the album has a weighted average of 78 based on reviews from 5 critics, indicating "generally favorable reviews".

== Track listing ==
All tracks are written by Natalie Merchant.

No.	Title	Length
1.	"San Andreas Fault"	4:49
2.	"Beloved Wife"	5:26
3.	"Carnival"	4:57
4.	"River"	5:43
5.	"The Letter"	3:56
6.	"Where I Go"	4:02
7.	"I May Know the Word"	7:41
8.	"Seven Years"	5:04
9.	"Cowboy Romance"	6:07
10.	"Jealousy"	4:05
11.	"Wonder"	4:49
Total length:		56:39

== Personnel ==
Credits for Paradise Is There: The New Tigerlily Recordings adapted from Tidal and Nonesuch Records' official website.

=== Musicians ===
- Natalie Merchant - lead vocals (all tracks), writing
- Jesse Murphy - acoustic bass, bass
- Gabriel Gordon - acoustic guitar, background vocals, electric guitar
- Simi Stone - background vocals
- Bella Blasko - background vocals (4)
- Elizabeth Mitchell - background vocals (4, 6)
- Gail Ann Dorsey - background vocals (11)
- Stanley Moore - cello
- Allison Miller - drums
- Uri Sharlin - piano, accordion
- Sharel Cassity - tenor saxophone
- Marandi Hostetter - viola
- Scott Moore - violin
- Shawn Moore - violin

=== Technical ===
- Eli Walker - engineering, editing
- George Cowan - engineering
- Scott Hull - mastering
- Randall Craig Felischer - orchestration (2)
- Tony Finno - string quintet (2), string arrangement (8)
- Stephen Barber - string arrangement (4)
- Sean O'Loughlin - string arrangement (5)
- Uri Sharlin - string arrangement (7)
- Arthur Moorehead - production coordination
- Karina Beznicki - production supervisor
- Jennifer McKinley - project coordinator
- Matthew Rankin - project coordinator
- Summer Damon - project coordinator
- Natalie Merchant - liner notes, production
- John Huba - photography

== Charts ==
Chart (2015)	Peak position
Belgian Albums (Ultratop Flanders)	90
Belgian Albums (Ultratop Wallonia)	185
Dutch Albums (Album Top 100)	61
US Billboard 200	96
US Americana/Folk Albums (Billboard)	5
US Top Rock Albums (Billboard)	9
US Indie Store Album Sales (Billboard)	12
