= Erik Della Penna =

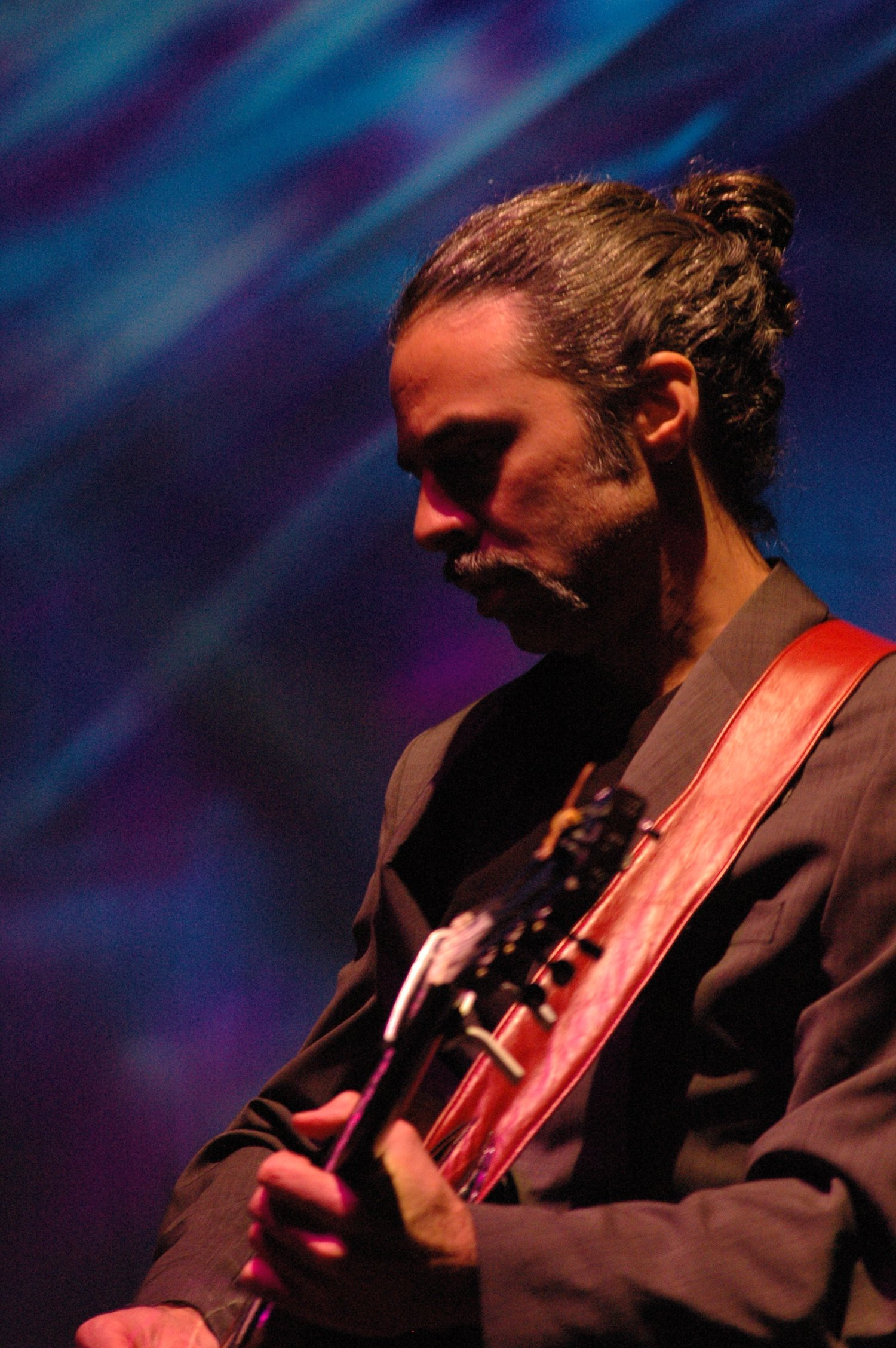

Background information
- Born: 2 June 1965 (age 60); The Bronx, New York, U.S.
- Genres: Americana, folk, musical theater, pop, rock
- Occupations: Musician, composer, lyricist, songwriter
- Instruments: Guitar, banjo, mandolin, lap steel, voice
- Works: Erik Della Penna at AllMusic
- Years active: 1992-present
- Website: erikdellapenna.com

Erik Della Penna (born June 2, 1965) is a Tony-nominated American composer-lyricist, songwriter, and musician. He has scored two films, composed and written the lyrics for two children’s musicals, and has written and recorded twelve albums of songs. He has also been the principal guitarist for pop singer Natalie Merchant since 2001. For co-writing the music and lyrics for the musical Dead Outlaw with David Yazbek, he was nominated for the Tony Award for Best Original Score and won the Drama Desk Award for Outstanding Lyrics.

== Early life ==
Erik Della Penna was born in The Bronx and grew up on Long Island, New York. He is conservatory-trained, having received a degree in Classical Guitar from the Mannes School of Music.

== Career ==
In 1994, Della Penna began touring with pop singer Joan Osborne on the Mercury Records label. Later, he toured and recorded with American singer-songwriter Natalie Merchant in support of several studio albums. During this time he also toured with folk singer Joan Baez and joined the international band Hazmat Modine as a guitarist and songwriter. Della Penna also has his own band called Kill Henry Sugar, a "metropolitan folk" duo with drummer and grammy-winning producer Dean Sharenow.

In February 2024, his musical Dead Outlaw opened at the Minetta Lane Theatre. It became a New York Times critic's pick and earned eleven Drama Desk Award nominations, winning three. It opened on Broadway at the Longacre Theatre on April 27th, 2025. This production was also designated a New York Times critic's pick and was nominated for seven Tony Awards in May of 2025.

== Composer credits ==
=== Theater and film ===
Year	Title	Credit	Category	Producer	ref
2002	Toby and the Big Top	Composer, Lyricist	Children's musical	Walden Media	
2009	Remnants of a War	Composer	Film score	Pinhole Pictures	
2015	Kitty Hawk	Composer, Lyricist	Children's musical	Adrienne Arsht Center	
2015	Tree Man	Composer	Film score	Jon Reiner, Brad Rothschild	
2024	Dead Outlaw	Composer, Lyricist	Musical	Audible	
2025	Dead Outlaw	Composer, Lyricist	Musical	Lia Vollack; Sonia Friedman	

=== Recorded music ===
Year	Title	Artist	Credit	ref
2000	Righteous Love	Joan Osborne	Guitars, Composer	
2001	Damascus	David Yazbek	Guitar (Electric), Lap Steel Guitar, Composer	
2001	Popular Music for Today's Active Lifestyles	Kill Henry Sugar	Guitars, Vocals, Composer	
2003	Sell This Place	Kill Henry Sugar	Guitars, Vocals, Composer	
2004	Love Beach	Kill Henry Sugar	Guitars, Vocals, Composer	
2007	Swing Back and Down	Kill Henry Sugar	Guitars, Vocals, Composer	
2008	Evil Monkey Man	David Yazbek	Composer, Guitars	
2009	Hot Messiah	Kill Henry Sugar	Guitars, Vocals, Composer	
2011	Cicada	Hazmat Modine	Guitar, Vocals, Composer	
2016	Extra-Deluxe-Supreme	Hazmat Modine	Composer, Guitars, Vocals	
2020	An Evening in New York	Rachelle Garnier & Erik Della Penna	Composer, Guitar, Banjo, Vocals	
2020	Box of Breath	Hazmat Modine	Banjo, Composer, Guitar, Vocals	
2020	The Mojo Manifesto	Mojo Nixon	Composer	
2021	Rainy	Erik Della Penna	Composer, vocals, instrumentation	
2023	Bonfire	Hazmat Modine	Vocals, Guitars, Composer	
2023	Stop Time	Kill Henry Sugar	Vocals, Composer, Guitars	

== Other credits ==
Year	Title	Artist	Credit	ref
1997	Chocolate Supa Highway	Spearhead	Guitar	
1999	Tears of Stone	The Chieftains	Guitar	
2001	Motherland	Natalie Merchant	Banjo, Bazouki, Guitar (Classical), Guitar (Electric), Lap Steel Guitar, Oud	
2003	The House Carpenter's Daughter	Natalie Merchant	Guitar, Lap Steel Guitar	
2003	Seeds: The Songs of Pete Seeger, Vol. 3	Pete Seeger	Guitar	
2005	Bowery Songs	Joan Baez	Banjo, Guitar, Lap Steel Guitar, Vocals	
2005	Dirty Rotten Scoundrels	Original Broadway Cast	Guitars, Banjo, Lap Steel Guitar	
2009	3 Balloons	Stephen Lynch	Guitar	
2009	Saints and Tzadiks	Susan McKeown	Guitar (Acoustic), Guitar (Electric), Humming, Tres	
2010	Leave Your Sleep	Natalie Merchant	Guitar	
2014	Natalie Merchant	Natalie Merchant	Guitar (Acoustic), Guitar (Electric), Lap Steel Guitar	
2021	I'll Meet You Here	Dar Williams	Guitar (Electric)	
2022	Radio Waves	Joan Osborne	Guitar	
2023	Keep Your Courage	Natalie Merchant	Guitar (12 String Acoustic), Guitar (Electric)	

== Awards and nominations ==
Year	Association	Category	Nominated work	Result	Ref
2024	Drama Desk Award	Outstanding Lyrics	Dead Outlaw	Won	
2024	Drama Desk Award	Outstanding Music	Dead Outlaw	Nominated	
2024	Drama Desk Award	Outstanding Orchestrations	Dead Outlaw	Nominated	
2024	New York Drama Critics Circle	Best Musical	Dead Outlaw	Won	
2024	Outer Critics Circle Award	Outstanding New Off-Broadway Musical	Dead Outlaw	Won	
2024	Outer Critics Circle Award	Outstanding New Score	Dead Outlaw	Nominated	
2024	Outer Critics Circle Award	Outstanding Orchestrations	Dead Outlaw	Nominated	
2025	Tony Award	Best Original Score	Dead Outlaw	Nominated	
