= Motherland (Natalie Merchant album) =

Studio album by Natalie Merchant
- Released: November 13, 2001
- Recorded: June 15 – September 9, 2001
- Studio: Allaire Studios (Shokan, New York); Clinton Studios (New York City, New York); Sunset Sound and Cello Studios (Hollywood, California).
- Genre: Folk rock
- Length: 58:22
- Label: Elektra
- Producer: Natalie Merchant; T-Bone Burnett

Natalie Merchant chronology
Live in Concert (1999)	Motherland (2001)	The House Carpenter's Daughter (2003)

Singles from Motherland
- 1. "Just Can't Last" Released: September 2001; 2. "Build a Levee" Released: 2002; 3. "Tell Yourself" Released: 2002

Professional ratings
Aggregate scores
Source	Rating
Metacritic	79/100
Review scores
Source	Rating
AllMusic	4/5 stars
Billboard	(Favorable)
E! Online	B+
Entertainment Weekly	B
Jam!	(Favorable)
Mojo	4/5 stars
Q	3/5 stars
Rolling Stone	3.5/5 stars
Slant Magazine	3.5/5 stars
Uncut	4/5 stars

Motherland is the third studio album by Natalie Merchant, released on November 13, 2001, by Elektra Records.

== History ==
Originally, a song named "The End" was supposed to appear on the album instead of "Not In This Life". Merchant noted that: "I'd take out one song, 'Not in This Life,' because it seems frivolous to me now. And I'd put back a song called 'The End,' which probably would have gotten me in trouble. Part of the lyric goes: 'That'll be the end of war/ the end of the law of Bible, of Koran, Torah.' I really wanted to put it on the record, but I felt there was so much serious material already that I chose something lighter, for balance." "The End" later appeared on Merchant's self-titled sixth studio album (2014).

Two tracks from Motherland, "Tell Yourself" and "Not in This Life", appeared on the television series Felicity and Alias respectively. The song "Henry Darger" is about "posthumously appreciated outsider artist" Henry Darger.

== Track listing ==
All songs written by Natalie Merchant.

1. "This House Is on Fire" – 4:42
2. "Motherland" – 4:44
3. "Saint Judas" – 5:44
4. "Put the Law on You" – 5:01
5. "Build a Levee" – 4:46
6. "Golden Boy" – 4:10
7. "Henry Darger" – 4:24
8. "The Worst Thing" – 5:46
9. "Tell Yourself" – 5:14
10. "Just Can't Last" – 4:31
11. "Not in This Life" – 5:22
12. "I'm Not Gonna Beg" – 3:40

== Personnel ==
- Natalie Merchant – vocals, Rhodes piano (5), acoustic piano (11, 12)
- Elizabeth Steen – Hammond organ (1, 3, 4, 5, 9–12), mellotron (6), Wurlitzer electric piano (8), acoustic piano (9)
- Van Dyke Parks – accordion (2)
- Patrick Warren – pump organ (2, 9), Chamberlin (5, 6, 9, 10, 11)
- Keefus Ciancia – acoustic piano (4), Hammond organ (5), keyboards (6)
- Guy Klucevsek – accordion (8)
- Gabriel Gordon – electric guitar (1, 3, 4, 6, 8, 10, 11, 12), EBow (6), classical guitar (8), acoustic guitar (10, 11), vocals (10)
- Erik Della Penna – oud (1), banjo (3, 10), electric guitar (4, 6, 8, 11), classical guitar (8), acoustic guitar (9), bouzouki (10), lap steel guitar (10, 12)
- Greg Leisz – acoustic guitar (2, 9), banjo (2), mandolin (2), electric guitar (5), 12-string guitar (9)
- Graham Maby – bass guitar (1, 3, 4, 8–12)
- Mike Elizondo – acoustic bass (2, 6)
- Bob Glaub – bass guitar (5)
- Matt Chamberlain – drums (1, 3–6, 8, 9–12), percussion (1, 6, 8, 9, 11)
- Carla Azar – drums (live) (6)
- Sandra Church – alto flute (1)
- David Ralicke – tenor saxophone (4, 5, 10), baritone saxophone (5, 10), trombone (10)
- Mitchell Estrin – bass clarinet (7)
- David Krakauer – clarinet (8)
- Tony Kadleck – trumpet (7)
- Chris Tedesco – trumpet (10)
- Philip Myers – French horn (7)
- Stephen Barber – arrangements and conductor (1, 7, 8)
- Mavis Staples – vocals (3, 5)
- Kate Daley – Vivian girl's (7)
- Kelly Daley – Vivian girl's (7)
- Katie Goldberg – vocals (9)

String sections (1, 7, 8)

- Alan Stepansky – cello (1, 7, 8)
- Elizabeth Dyson – cello (7)
- Sarah Seiver – cello (7)
- Jeremy McCoy – double bass (7)
- Karen Dreyfus – viola (1, 7, 8)
- Nicholas Cords – viola (7)
- Vivek Kamath – viola (7)
- Sandra Park – violin (1, 8), first violin (7), string contractor (7)
- Sharon Yamada – violin (1, 7, 8)
- Bruno Eicher – violin (7)
- Soo Hyun Kwon – violin (7)
- Ann Kim – violin (7)
- Lisa Kim – violin (7)
- Krzysztof Kuznik – violin (7)
- Karen Marx – violin (7)
- Laura Seaton – violin (7)
- Rob Shaw – violin (7)
- Fiona Simon – violin (7)
- Jung Sun Yoo – violin (7)

== Production ==
- T-Bone Burnett – producer
- Natalie Merchant – producer, package design
- Mike Piersante – recording
- Ryan Boesch – recording assistant
- Kevin Dean – recording assistant
- Brandon Mason – recording assistant
- Keith Shortreed – recording assistant
- Jim Scott – additional recording, mixing
- Jennifer Hilliard – mix assistant
- Robert Read – mix assistant
- Bob Ludwig – mastering at Gateway Mastering (Portland, Maine)
- Paul Ackling – production assistant, guitar technician
- Lili Picou – package design
- Laura Wilson – photography
- Gary Smith – management

== Charts ==
Chart performance for Motherland
Chart (2001)	Peak position
Australian Albums (ARIA)	83
New Zealand Albums (RMNZ)	11
US Billboard 200	30
