= Tigerlily =

Studio album by Natalie Merchant
- Released: June 20, 1995
- Recorded: December 1994–March 1995
- Studios: Bearsville Studios (Bearsville, NY); The Club House (Germantown, NY); RPM Studios (New York, NY); Sony Music Studios (New York, NY)
- Genre: Alternative rock
- Length: 52:06
- Label: Elektra
- Producer: Natalie Merchant

Natalie Merchant chronology
Tigerlily (1995)	Ophelia (1998)

Singles from Tigerlily
- 1. "Carnival" Released: June 5, 1995; 2. "Wonder" Released: 1995; 3. "Jealousy" Released: 1996

Tigerlily is the debut studio album by American singer-songwriter Natalie Merchant, released on June 20, 1995, following her departure from the alternative rock band 10,000 Maniacs.

Tigerlily peaked at No. 13 on the Billboard 200 album chart and was certified five-times platinum by the Recording Industry Association of America in 2001. It contained three singles that charted on the Billboard Hot 100: "Carnival" (No. 10), "Wonder" (No. 20), and "Jealousy" (No. 23).

== Re-releases ==
Tigerlily was re-released in 1996 as a 2-CD set, with the second CD containing a remix of the song "Jealousy" and live performances from her tour.

In 2015, to commemorate the album's 20th anniversary, Merchant rerecorded the songs from the album and released them as Paradise Is There: The New Tigerlily Recordings.

== Background ==
The song "River" is a tribute to River Phoenix.

Aileen Wuornos requested that Merchant's song "Carnival" be played at her funeral, and the song later appeared in the credits of the 2003 documentary Aileen: Life and Death of a Serial Killer. Merchant later commented:

"When director Nick Broomfield sent a working edit of the film, I was so disturbed by the subject matter that I couldn't even watch it. Aileen Wuornos led a tortured, torturing life that is beyond my worst nightmares. It wasn't until I was told that Aileen spent many hours listening to my album Tigerlily while on death row and requested "Carnival" be played at her funeral that I gave permission for the use of the song. It's very odd to think of the places my music can go once it leaves my hands. If it gave her some solace, I have to be grateful."

== Reception ==
Professional ratings
Review scores
Source	Rating
AllMusic	4.5/5 stars
Chicago Tribune	2.5/4 stars
Entertainment Weekly	B+
The Guardian	4/5 stars
Los Angeles Times	3/4 stars
NME	5/10
Q	2/5 stars
Rolling Stone	1.5/5 stars
The Rolling Stone Album Guide	3.5/5 stars
Spin	3/10

Among positive reviews, J. D. Considine commented in Musician that Tigerlily shows "a far greater stylistic range than the Maniacs" and "Merchant conveys more passion and personality than in the past", while Mark Cooper of Mojo highlighted "her flair for narrative songwriting and that habitual chafing between the sober and the sensual, sense and sensibility." Los Angeles Times critic Jean Rosenbluth wrote that Tigerlily "presents Merchant as considerably more mature and womanly than the Maniacs gave her room to be" and "marks positive progress for a talent that is still in bloom." In The Guardian, Caroline Sullivan opined that Merchant had surpassed her work in 10,000 Maniacs with an album of "11 moving lyrics, sung with great grace", singling out "Beloved Wife" as possibly "the most touching thing committed to disc this year." Writing for Entertainment Weekly, David Browne observed that, "with its unadorned, keyboard-based arrangements, Tigerlily is more sparely produced than anything Merchant did with 10,000 Maniacs, yet the starkness works in her favor ... The hooks on this album are subtler, and ultimately Merchant sounds both more natural and affecting." While Browne expressed a desire for Merchant to "lighten up," he also praised her "uncompromising vision." Brad Webber of the Chicago Tribune felt that Merchant's "characteristic trills and unique vocal stylism paint Tigerlily with bravura and make amends for some tepid songwriting."

Al Weisel, however, said in Rolling Stone that Merchant's voice had "nearly deteriorated into self-parody", adding, "With its surfeit of blindly self-obsessed lyrics and lulling lite-rock arrangements, the bulk of Tigerlily provides a perfect soundtrack for the Prozac nation." Elysa Gardner panned it in Spin as a "predictably tasteful effort" that "makes 10,000 Maniacs actually sound like ten thousand maniacs", while Q's Phil Sutcliffe found it lacking in "conviction or soul", and NME's Mark Sutherland deemed it "nice" yet mostly "routine reflection". Critic Robert Christgau left no comment beyond an indifferent grade of "neither".

In a retrospective review for AllMusic, Stephen Thomas Erlewine concluded that "the added emphasis on rhythmic texture works, creating an intimate but not exclusive atmosphere that holds throughout the record, even when her occasionally sophomoric, sentimental poetry threatens to sink the album in the weight of its own preciousness". Tom Moon, in the 2004 Rolling Stone Album Guide, compared the songs on Tigerlily to the "ambitious, unconventional material" Merchant wrote as a member of 10,000 Maniacs, "which made good use of her porcelain voice and exotic lyrical imagery."

== Track listing ==
All tracks are written by Natalie Merchant, except where noted.

No.	Title	Length
1.	"San Andreas Fault"	3:57
2.	"Wonder"	4:26
3.	"Beloved Wife"	5:03
4.	"River"	5:32
5.	"Carnival"	5:59
6.	"I May Know the Word"	8:07
7.	"The Letter"	2:12
8.	"Cowboy Romance"	4:39
9.	"Jealousy"	2:41
10.	"Where I Go"	3:59
11.	"Seven Years"	5:31

1996 bonus disc
No.	Title	Writer(s)	Length
1.	"Jealousy" (remix edit)		2:44
2.	"Sympathy for the Devil" (live)	Mick Jagger; Keith Richards	5:17
3.	"Baby I Love You/Son of a Preacher Man (Medley)" (live)	Ronnie Shannon; John Hurley; Ronnie Wilkins	5:54
4.	"Take a Look" (live)	Allen Toussaint	3:45
5.	"The Work Song" (live)	Nat Adderley; Oscar Brown Jr.	3:52

== Personnel ==
- Natalie Merchant – vocals, piano, organ, vibraphone
- Jennifer Turner – electric and acoustic guitars, backing vocals
- Peter Yanowitz – drums, percussion
- Barrie Maguire – bass guitar, 12-string electric guitar

Additional musicians

- John Holbrook – electric guitar (1, 9), organ (3, 9)
- Adrián López Guevarra – percussion (5, 10)
- Matt Henderson – electric guitar (1), bass guitar (1)
- Jay Ungar – violin (8)
- Michelle Kinney – cello (11)
- Katell Keineg – backing vocals (5)
- Eric Schenkman – electric guitar (9)
- Randy Grant – percussion (1)

Technical

- John Holbrook – engineer, mixing
- Natalie Merchant – package design
- Frank Olinsky – package design
- Dan Borris – portraits of Natalie
- José Picayo – band photographs
- Todd Vos – assistant engineer
- Paul Antonell – assistant engineer

Robert Frazza - engineer

- Suzanne Dyer – assistant engineer
- Andrew Page – assistant engineer
- Bob Ludwig – mastering

== Charts ==
=== Weekly charts ===
Chart (1995)	Peak position
Australian Albums (ARIA)	18
Canada Top Albums/CDs (RPM)	44
New Zealand Albums (RMNZ)	14
Scottish Albums (Official Charts)	65
UK Albums (Official Charts)	39
US Billboard 200	13

=== Year-end charts ===
Chart (1995)	Position
US Billboard 200	57
Chart (1996)	Position
New Zealand Albums (RMNZ)	36
US Billboard 200	25

== Certifications ==
Region	Certification	Certified units/sales
Australia (ARIA)	Gold	35,000^{^}
Canada (Music Canada)	Gold	50,000^{^}
United Kingdom (BPI)	Silver	100,000
United States (RIAA)	5× Platinum	5,000,000^{^}
^{^} Shipments figures based on certification alone.
