= Butterfly (Natalie Merchant album) =

Studio album by Natalie Merchant
- Released: July 14, 2017
- Genre: Soft rock; folk pop
- Producer: Natalie Merchant

Natalie Merchant chronology
Folk Songs (2017)	Butterfly (2017)	Keep Your Courage (2023)

Butterfly is a 2017 album by Natalie Merchant released as part of "The Natalie Merchant Collection," a 10-compact disc box set that features Merchant's eight solo albums. The album features four new songs and six catalogue songs re-recorded with a string quartet and a full disc of rarities and outtakes.

== Track listing ==
All tracks are written by Natalie Merchant, except "Vain & Careless", written by Robert Graves, and "The Man in the Wilderness", credited to Mother Goose.

No.	Title	Length
1.	"Butterfly"	5:39
2.	"She Devil"	6:58
3.	"Baby Mine"	4:06
4.	"Frozen Charlotte"	5:58
5.	"Ophelia"	5:32
6.	"The Worst Thing"	5:11
7.	"The Man in the Wilderness"	3:47
8.	"My Skin"	4:57
9.	"Vain & Careless"	4:24
10.	"Andalucia"	5:40
Total length:		52:12
