= Carnival (Natalie Merchant song) =

1995 single by Natalie Merchant

Single by Natalie Merchant

from the album Tigerlily
- B-side: "I May Know the Word"
- Released: June 5, 1995
- Studio: Bearsville (Bearsville, New York)
- Length: 5:59 (album version); 4:01 (edit)
- Label: Elektra
- Songwriter: Natalie Merchant
- Producer: Natalie Merchant

Natalie Merchant singles chronology
"Carnival" (1995)	"Wonder" (1995)

Music video
- "Carnival" on YouTube

"Carnival" is a song written and produced by American singer-songwriter Natalie Merchant and was the lead single from her debut solo album, Tigerlily (1995). In the lyrics, the protagonist describes a street scene as a carnival. Merchant was inspired to write the song after visiting New York City for the first time when she was 16, claiming she was fascinated with the residents' unusual lifestyles, as she grew up in rural areas.

The single was released in the United States in June 1995 and reached number 10 on the Billboard Hot 100, becoming Merchant's highest-charting solo single in the US. It is also her most successful hit in Australia, peaking at number 24 on the ARIA Singles Chart, and reached number 17 in Canada. The single received a radio edit cutting the song down from the six-minute LP version. The video for the song, directed by Melodie McDaniel, shows scenes of Merchant walking the streets of New York City taking street photographs with a Leica M3.

== Track listings ==
US CD single

1. "Carnival" – 5:59
2. "I May Know the Word" – 8:01

US cassette single

A. "Carnival" (album version) – 5:59
B. "I May Know the Word" (album version) – 8:07

European and Australian CD single

1. "Carnival" (edit) – 4:02
2. "Carnival" (LP version) – 5:59
3. "I May Know the Word" – 8:07

== Credits and personnel ==
Credits are lifted from the US CD single liner notes.

Studios

- Recorded at Bearsville Studios (Bearsville, New York)
- Additional recording at The Club House (Germantown, New York)
- Mixed at Sony Studios (New York City)
- Mastered at Gateway Mastering (Portland, Maine, US)

Personnel

- Natalie Merchant – writing, vocals, piano, organ
- Katell Keineg – background vocals
- Jennifer Turner – electric guitar
- Barrie Maguire – bass guitar
- Peter Yanowitz – drums
- Adrián López Guevarra – percussion
- John Holbrook – mixing, engineering
- Todd Vos – assistant engineering (Bearsville)
- Paul Antonell – assistant engineering (The Club House)
- Andrew Page – assistant engineering (Sony)
- Bob Ludwig – mastering

== Charts ==
=== Weekly charts ===
Chart (1995)	Peak position
Australia (ARIA)	24
Canada Top Singles (RPM)	17
Canada Adult Contemporary (RPM)	30
Canada Rock/Alternative (RPM)	6
Iceland (Íslenski Listinn Topp 40)	28
US Billboard Hot 100	10
US Adult Contemporary (Billboard)	8
US Adult Pop Airplay (Billboard)	8
US Alternative Airplay (Billboard)	12
US Pop Airplay (Billboard)	6

=== Year-end charts ===
Chart (1995)	Position
Canada Rock/Alternative (RPM)	28
US Billboard Hot 100	60
US Modern Rock Tracks (Billboard)	18

Chart (1996)	Position
US Adult Contemporary (Billboard)	29
US Top 40/Mainstream (Billboard)	68

== Release history ==
Region	Date	Format(s)	Label(s)	Ref.
United States	June 5, 1995	Progressive rock; alternative radio	Elektra	
United States	July 1995	Cassette	Elektra	
Australia	August 28, 1995	CD	Elektra	
