= Natalie Merchant (album) =

Studio album by Natalie Merchant
- Released: May 6, 2014
- Studio: The Clubhouse (Rhinebeck); Electric Lady (New York City)
- Length: 47:25
- Label: Nonesuch
- Producer: Natalie Merchant

Natalie Merchant chronology
| Leave Your Sleep (2010) | Natalie Merchant (2014) | Paradise Is There: The New Tigerlily Recordings (2015) |

Natalie Merchant is the sixth studio album by American singer-songwriter Natalie Merchant, released on May 6, 2014, by Nonesuch Records. Her first studio album consisting of all original material since Motherland (2001), it revisits a characteristic theme of Merchant's, of "characters, and women in particular, struggling in a culture where odds are stacked against them".

== Critical reception ==
Professional ratings
Aggregate scores
| Source | Rating |
|---|---|
| Metacritic | 73/100 |
Review scores
| Source | Rating |
| AllMusic | 3.5/5 stars |
| Drowned in Sound | 6/10 |
| Exclaim! | 7/10 |
| PopMatters | 7/10 |

Upon release, the album received generally positive reviews from critics. At Metacritic, which assigns a normalized score out of 100 based on reviews from critics, the album received a score of 73, indicating "generally favorable reviews".

== Commercial reception ==
In the United States, the album debuted at No. 20 on the Billboard 200 albums chart on its first week of release, selling around 12,000 copies in the United States in its first week. It also debuted at No. 2 on Billboard's Folk Albums, and No. 5 on the Rock Albums chart. As of October 2015, the album has sold 44,000 copies in the US.

== Track listing ==
All tracks are written by Natalie Merchant.

Natalie Merchant track listing
| No. | Title | Length |
|---|---|---|
| 1. | "Ladybird" | 6:37 |
| 2. | "Maggie Said" | 4:27 |
| 3. | "Texas" | 5:02 |
| 4. | "Go Down Moses" | 5:01 |
| 5. | "Seven Deadly Sins" | 4:51 |
| 6. | "Giving Up Everything" | 4:20 |
| 7. | "Black Sheep" | 4:08 |
| 8. | "It's A-Coming" | 3:50 |
| 9. | "Lulu (introduction)" | 1:03 |
| 10. | "Lulu" | 4:15 |
| 11. | "The End" | 5:11 |
| Total length: | | 47:25 |

== Personnel ==
Credits adapted from CD liner notes.

Musicians

- Natalie Merchant – vocals (1–8, 10, 11)
- Eddie Allen – flugelhorn (4, 5), trumpet (4, 5)
- Kyle Armbrust – viola (6, 11)
- Stephen Barber – string arrangement (1, 10), woodwind arrangement (10)
- Andrew Barr – drums (3, 8)
- Jonathan Dreyden – organ (8)
- Steve Elson – clarinet (7), saxophone (7)
- Tony Finno – string arrangement (6, 11)
- Nadège Foofat – string arrangement (6, 11)
- Marc Friedman – bass guitar (3, 8)
- Clark Gayton – horn arrangement (4), trombone (4, 5), tuba (4, 5)
- Quan Ge – violin (1, 6, 11)
- Mark Goldberg – bassoon (10)
- Gabriel Gordon – acoustic guitar (1–5, 7, 10), electric guitar (1, 2, 4, 6–8, 10)
- Vivek Kamath – viola (1)
- Mindy Kaufmann – flute (10)
- Lisa Kim – violin (1, 6, 10, 11)
- Liz Lim – violin (1, 6, 11)
- Joanna Maurer – violin (1, 6, 11)
- Jeremy McCoy – double bass (1, 6, 11)
- Anthony McGill – clarinet (10)
- John Medeski – organ (1, 4), electric keyboard (2)
- Elizabeth Mitchell – backing vocals (2, 6)
- Kurt Muroki – double bass (6, 11)
- Jesse Murphy – bass guitar (1, 2, 4, 6, 7), acoustic bass (5, 10), tuba (10)
- John Patitucci – double bass (1)
- Shawn Pelton – drums (1, 2, 4–7)
- Erik Della Penna – electric guitar (1, 2, 4, 7, 8), lap steel guitar (3, 5), acoustic guitar (10)
- Robert Rinehart – viola (1, 6, 10, 11)
- Sein Ryu – violin (1, 6, 11)
- Uri Sharlin – grand piano (1, 4, 10), Wurlitzer piano (2), accordion (5), electric piano (7), tack piano (10)
- Corliss Stafford – vocals (4)
- Alan Stepansky – cello (1, 6, 10, 11)
- Simi Stone – backing vocals (1, 4)
- Tamar-kali – backing vocals (1)
- Johanna Warren – backing vocals (1, 2, 6)
- Kenny Wollesen – drums (10), percussion (10)
- Sharon Yamada – violin (1, 6, 10, 11)
- Ru Pie Yeh – cello (6, 11)
- Wei Yu – cello (1)

Technical & design

- Natalie Merchant – production
- Paul Antonell – recording
- Elizabeth Bauer – engineering assistance
- Bella Blasko – engineering assistance
- George Cowan – recording
- Kabir Hermon – engineering assistance
- John Horne – engineering assistance
- F. Ron Miller – package design
- Alex Nappi – engineering assistance
- Eli Walker – recording, mixing
- Dan Winters – photography

== Charts ==
Chart performance for Natalie Merchant
| Chart (2014) | Peak position |
|---|---|
| Australian Albums (ARIA) | 87 |
| Belgian Albums (Ultratop Flanders) | 29 |
| Belgian Albums (Ultratop Wallonia) | 153 |
| Dutch Albums (Album Top 100) | 17 |
| German Albums (Offizielle Top 100) | 72 |
| UK Albums (OCC) | 34 |
| US Billboard 200 | 20 |
| US Americana/Folk Albums (Billboard) | 2 |
| US Top Rock Albums (Billboard) | 5 |
| US Indie Store Album Sales (Billboard) | 8 |
