= Ophelia (album) =

Studio album by Natalie Merchant
- Released: May 19, 1998
- Recorded: July 1996 – May 1997
- Studios: Talking Dwarf (Little Valley, New York); AIR (London, UK); Ocean Way (Hollywood, California)
- Genres: Pop, rock, folk
- Length: 56:38
- Label: Elektra
- Producer: Natalie Merchant

Natalie Merchant chronology
Tigerlily (1995)	Ophelia (1998)	Live in Concert (1999)

Singles from Ophelia
- 1. "Kind & Generous" Released: May 5, 1998; 2. "Break Your Heart" Released: 1998; 3. "Life Is Sweet" Released: 1999

Professional ratings
Review scores
Source	Rating
AllMusic	3/5 stars
Chicago Sun-Times	3.5/4 stars
Entertainment Weekly	B
The Guardian	4/5 stars
Los Angeles Times	3/4 stars
Pitchfork	4.1/10
Q	3/5 stars
Rolling Stone	3.5/5 stars
Uncut	5/5 stars
USA Today	3/4 stars

Ophelia is the second studio album by the American singer-songwriter Natalie Merchant, released on May 19, 1998, by Elektra Records. The album was supported by the singles "Kind & Generous" and "Break Your Heart", with the former being the most successful single of the album, reaching the top 20 of the Billboard Hot 100 Airplay Chart. "Break Your Heart" also received single and video treatment. These and the other videos from the album, plus three from Tigerlily, were gathered on a Warner Music Vision home video, also entitled Ophelia. "I love the opportunity to flex my thespian muscle," Merchant quips on it. The album became Merchant's only top ten hit on the Billboard 200, where it peaked at number eight.

Merchant built Talking Dwarf Studio in her home and this was the sole recording made in her home studio; she sold the audio equipment in 2022.

== Track listing ==
All songs were written by Natalie Merchant except 11 (Traditional).

1. "Ophelia" – 5:10
2. "Life is Sweet" – 5:12
3. "Kind & Generous" – 4:07
4. "Frozen Charlotte" (with Karen Peris of The Innocence Mission) – 5:23
5. "My Skin" – 5:30
6. "Break Your Heart" (with N'Dea Davenport) – 4:47
7. "King of May" – 4:09
8. "Thick as Thieves" – 6:57
9. "Effigy" – 2:30
10. "The Living" – 3:18
11. "When They Ring the Golden Bells" (with Karen Peris of The Innocence Mission) / "Ophelia (Reprise)" (string arrangement by Gavin Bryars; hidden track) – 9:33

== Personnel ==
- Natalie Merchant – vocals, Wurlitzer electric piano (4, 9), acoustic piano (5, 10), Hammond organ (9)
- George Laks – acoustic piano (1, 2), organ (1), Wurlitzer electric piano (3), Hammond organ (3, 7), Rhodes piano (7)
- Ken Appollo – barrel organ (1)
- Todd Vos – electric guitar (1)
- Craig Ross – electric guitar (2, 3, 6), acoustic guitar (2, 5, 7)
- Lokua Kanza – acoustic guitar (3, 6)
- Don Peris – electric guitar (4, 11)
- Donnie Ward – electric guitar (6)
- Daniel Lanois – electric guitar (8)
- Karen Peris – vocals (4, 11), acoustic guitar (11)
- Graham Maby – bass (2, 3, 4, 6, 7, 8, 10, 11)
- Jay Brunga – acoustic bass (5)
- Peter Yanowitz – drums (1–8, 10, 11)
- Joakim Lartey – percussion (3)
- Michelle Kinney – cello (1, 5, 8)
- Karl Berger – string arrangements and conductor (2, 6, 7)
- Garo Yellin – cello (2, 6, 7)
- Ralph Farris – viola (2, 6, 7)
- Conway Kuo – viola (2, 6, 7)
- Hector Falcon – violin (2, 6, 7)
- Krystof Witek – violin (2, 6, 7)
- Tom Varner – French horn (2)
- Chris Botti – trumpet (6)
- N'Dea Davenport – vocals (6)
- Yungchen Lhamo – vocals (9), Tibetan translation (9)

Credits for "Ophelia" and "Ophelia (Reprise)"

- Camille Labro – French voice (1)
- Susanna Schmitz – German voice (1)
- Carmen Consoli – Italian voice (1)
- Bella Urina – Russian voice (1)
- Rocio Paez – Spanish voice (1)
- Christopher Wilson – theorbo (11.3)
- Pamela Thorby – recorder (11.3)
- William Hunt – string bass (11.3)
- Susanna Pell – bass viol (11.3)
- Richard Campbell – tenor viol (11.3)
- Julia Hodgson – tenor viol (11.3)
- Wendy Gillespie – treble viol (11.3)

Technical personnel

- Todd Vos – engineer (1–7, 10, 11.1)
- John Holbrook – engineer (8, 9)
- Rupert Coulson – engineer (11.3)
- Ricky Graham – assistant engineer (11.3)
- Jim Scott – mixing
- Mike Scotella – mix assistant
- Bob Ludwig – mastering at Gateway Mastering (Portland, Maine)
- Helene Silverman – package design
- Mark Seliger – photography
- Cynthia Rowley – costume designs

== Charts ==
=== Weekly charts ===
Chart (1998)	Peak position
Australian Albums (ARIA)	56
Canada Top Albums/CDs (RPM)	43
New Zealand Albums (RMNZ)	26
Scottish Albums (Official Charts)	75
UK Albums (Official Charts)	52
US Billboard 200	8

=== Year-end charts ===
Chart (1998)	Position
US Billboard 200	92

== Certifications ==
Region	Certification	Certified units/sales
Canada (Music Canada)	Gold	50,000^{^}
United States (RIAA)	Platinum	1,000,000^{^}
^{^} Shipments figures based on certification alone.
