= Leave Your Sleep =

Studio album by Natalie Merchant
- Released: 9 April 2010
- Genre: Folk
- Length: 104:51
- Label: Nonesuch
- Producers: Natalie Merchant, Andres Levin

Natalie Merchant chronology
Retrospective: 1995-2005 (2005)	Leave Your Sleep (2010)	Natalie Merchant (2014)

Professional ratings
Aggregate scores
Source	Rating
Metacritic	75/100
Review scores
Source	Rating
AllMusic	4/5 stars
BBC Music	(favorable)
Billboard	(favorable)
Drowned in Sound	4/10
Entertainment Weekly	B+
Paste	7.7/10
PopMatters	7/10 stars
Q	4/5 stars
Rolling Stone	3/5 stars

Leave Your Sleep is the fifth studio album by American singer-songwriter Natalie Merchant. Produced by Merchant and Andres Levin, the double concept album is "a project about childhood" and is a collection of music adapted from 19th and 20th century British and American poetry about childhood. BBC Music describes it as "200 years of lyrical and musical history, washing beautifully by."

== Tracks ==
Disc 1 — Leave Your Supper
No.	Title	Length
1.	"Nursery Rhyme of Innocence and Experience"	5:10
2.	"Equestrienne"	4:38
3.	"Calico Pie"	2:41
4.	"Bleezer's Ice-Cream"	5:16
5.	"It Makes a Change"	3:30
6.	"The King of China's Daughter"	2:39
7.	"The Dancing Bear"	5:37
8.	"The Man in the Wilderness"	3:44
9.	"Maggie and Milly and Molly and May"	4:06
10.	"If No One Ever Marries Me"	2:21
11.	"The Sleepy Giant"	3:19
12.	"The Peppery Man"	5:05
13.	"The Blind Men and the Elephant"	5:32

Disc 2 — Leave Your Sleep
No.	Title	Length
1.	"Adventures of Isabel"	3:23
2.	"The Walloping Window Blind"	4:16
3.	"Topsyturvey-World"	5:08
4.	"The Janitor's Boy"	3:52
5.	"Griselda"	5:50
6.	"The Land of Nod"	4:04
7.	"Vain and Careless"	4:42
8.	"Crying, My Little One"	2:26
9.	"Sweet and a Lullaby"	3:04
10.	"I Saw a Ship A-Sailing"	2:12
11.	"Autumn Lullaby"	3:21
12.	"Spring and Fall: to a Young Child"	3:03
13.	"Indian Names"	5:52

== Inspiration ==
The sleeve notes credit inspiration for the songs of this album as follows:

- Adventures of Isabel – Ogden Nash
- Autumn Lullaby – Anonymous
- Bleezer's Ice-Cream – Jack Prelutsky
- Calico Pie – Edward Lear
- Crying, My Little One – Christina Rossetti
- If No One Ever Marries Me – Laurence Alma-Tadema
- Indian Names – Lydia Huntley Sigourney
- I Saw a Ship A-Sailing – Anonymous
- It Makes a Change – Mervyn Peake
- Equestrienne – Rachel Field
- Griselda – Eleanor Farjeon
- Maggie and Milly and Molly and May – E. E. Cummings
- Nursery Rhyme of Innocence and Experience – Charles Causley
- Spring and Fall – Gerard Manley Hopkins
- Sweet and a Lullaby – Anonymous
- The Blindmen and the Elephant – John Godfrey Saxe
- The Dancing Bear – Albert Paine
- The Janitor's Boy – Nathalia Crane
- The King of China's Daughter – Anonymous
- The Land of Nod – Robert Louis Stevenson
- The Man in the Wilderness – Anonymous
- The Peppery Man – Arthur Macy
- The Sleepy Giant – Charles E. Carryl
- The Walloping Window Blind – Charles E. Carryl
- Topsyturvey-World – William Brighty Rands
- Vain and Careless – Robert Graves

== Charts ==
=== Weekly charts ===
Chart (2010)	Peak Position
Australian Albums (ARIA)	168
Austrian Album Charts	46
Belgian Albums (Ultratop Flanders)	37
French Albums (SNEP)	90
Irish Albums (IRMA)	50
Italian Albums (FIMI)	40
German Albums (Offizielle Top 100)	37
Dutch Albums (Album Top 100)	24
New Zealand Albums (RMNZ)	30
Scottish Albums (Official Charts)	32
UK Albums (Official Charts)	46
UK Album Downloads (Official Charts)	60
US Billboard 200	17
US Digital Albums (Billboard)	8
US Americana/Folk Albums (Billboard)	1
US Top Rock Albums (Billboard)	5
US Indie Store Album Sales (Billboard)	9

== Reception ==
BBC Music gave a review following the album's release:

What’s astonishing is how cohesive it all is: from the fire-eyed, Celtic-tinged chamber music of Nursery Rhyme of Innocence and Experience, through to the stark, troubled strings of the closing Indian Names, Leave Your Sleep never feels over-extended. The sheer ravishing beauty of the arrangements, combined with the tasteful, organic aesthetic (no synths here), prevents things ever jarring, and Merchant’s voice flows constant throughout, supple and hard as silken steel. Indeed, everything sounds so good from a purely musical perspective that the record perhaps doesn’t showcase its lyricists as well as it could. It’s hard to really see that it cumulatively says anything about childhood, except perhaps that it's the lurid bits that stick with you – Charles E. Carryl’s faintly traumatic The Sleepy Giant is a piece of grotesque that's hard to ignore. But most of these poems simply sink into the verdant whole – 200 years of lyrical and musical history, washing beautifully by.
