= Ossification of the posterior longitudinal ligament =

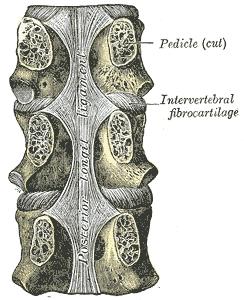
- Posterior longitudinal ligament (running vertically in the center) in the thoracic region.
- Specialty: Rheumatology

Ossification of the posterior longitudinal ligament (OPLL) is a process of fibrosis, calcification, and ossification of the posterior longitudinal ligament of the spine, that may involve the spinal dura. Once considered a disorder unique to people of Asian heritage, it is now recognized as an uncommon disorder in a variety of patients with myelopathy.

== Causes ==
Genetic and environmental factors appear to play a role in pathogenesis. Dr James Hong, lecturer at the University of Toronto with a special focus in cervical spinal myelopathy, states that sitting still for too long contributes to OPLL. OPLL may also be associated with diffuse idiopathic skeletal hyperostosis

== Diagnosis ==
Myeolography, including post-myelographic CT is likely the most effective imaging study an accurate diagnosis.

== Treatment ==
Surgical management options include extensive cervical laminectomy with or without an additional posterior arthrodesis, anterior decompression and arthrodesis, and posterior cervical laminoplasty. Treatment decisions can be made based on a grading systems devised by Hirabayashi et al., supplemented by the Nurick myelopathy classification system.

== Prognosis ==
Most patients suffer from only mild symptoms. Symptoms typically last approximately 13 months. Of patients without myelopathy at initial presentation, only 29% of them will develop myelopathy within 30 years.

== Epidemiology ==
The age range of patients with OPLL is from 32 to 81 years (mean = 53), with a male predominance. Prevalence is higher in those of Japanese or Asian ancestry (2–3.5%) and rarer in other racial groups (0.16%). Schizophrenia patients in Japan may have as high as 20% incidence.
