= Wonder (Natalie Merchant song) =

1995 single by Natalie Merchant

Single by Natalie Merchant

from the album Tigerlily
- Released: 1995
- Length: 4:26
- Label: Elektra; Warner
- Songwriter: Natalie Merchant
- Producer: Natalie Merchant

Natalie Merchant singles chronology
| "Carnival" (1995) | "Wonder" (1995) | "Jealousy" (1996) |

Music video
- "Wonder" on YouTube

"Wonder" is a song by Natalie Merchant, released in 1995 as the second single from her solo album Tigerlily. The single reached number 20 on the US Billboard Hot 100 and number 10 on the Canadian RPM 100 Hit Tracks chart, outperforming her previous single "Carnival" in Canada. The covers for the U.S. and European singles were different. The single also includes live cuts from Merchant's tour.

== Inspiration ==
In a BBC Mastertapes interview, Merchant said the song "... was about a child born with a congenital disease," twins she had known personally. It was later found out that the twins had epidermolysis bullosa (EB), a rare genetic condition that results in easy blistering of the skin and mucous membranes.

== Track listings ==
US CD single

1. "Wonder" (remix) – 4:24
2. "Baby I Love You" – 3:44

UK cassette single

1. "Wonder" (remix edit) – 4:08
2. "Sympathy for the Devil" (live) – 5:17

European CD1

1. "Wonder" (LP version) – 4:26
2. "Baby I Love You"/"Son of a Preacher Man" (live medley) – 5:55
3. "All I Want" – 3:17

European CD2

1. "Wonder" (remix edit) – 4:08
2. "Sympathy for the Devil" (live) – 5:17
3. "Take a Look" (live) – 3:14
4. "The Work Song" (live) – 3:52

European and Australian maxi-CD single

1. "Wonder" (remix edit) – 4:08
2. "Baby I Love You" – 3:44
3. "All I Want" – 3:17

== Charts ==
=== Weekly charts ===
| Chart (1996) | Peak position |
|---|---|
| Australia (ARIA) | 71 |
| Canada Top Singles (RPM) | 10 |
| Canada Adult Contemporary (RPM) | 21 |
| Canada Rock/Alternative (RPM) | 19 |
| Iceland (Íslenski Listinn Topp 40) | 30 |
| UK Singles (Official Charts) | 84 |
| US Billboard Hot 100 | 20 |
| US Adult Alternative Airplay (Billboard) | 8 |
| US Adult Contemporary (Billboard) | 18 |
| US Adult Pop Airplay (Billboard) | 2 |
| US Alternative Airplay (Billboard) | 16 |
| US Pop Airplay (Billboard) | 7 |

=== Year-end charts ===
| Chart (1996) | Position |
|---|---|
| Canada Top Singles (RPM) | 69 |
| US Billboard Hot 100 | 31 |
| US Adult Contemporary (Billboard) | 36 |
| US Adult Top 40 (Billboard) | 3 |
| US Modern Rock Tracks (Billboard) | 80 |
| US Top 40/Mainstream (Billboard) | 23 |

== Legacy ==
The song was credited as inspiration for R. J. Palacio's 2012 novel Wonder and was also played during the end credits of the 2017 film of the same name.
