= Natalie Merchant =

American singer-songwriter (born 1963)

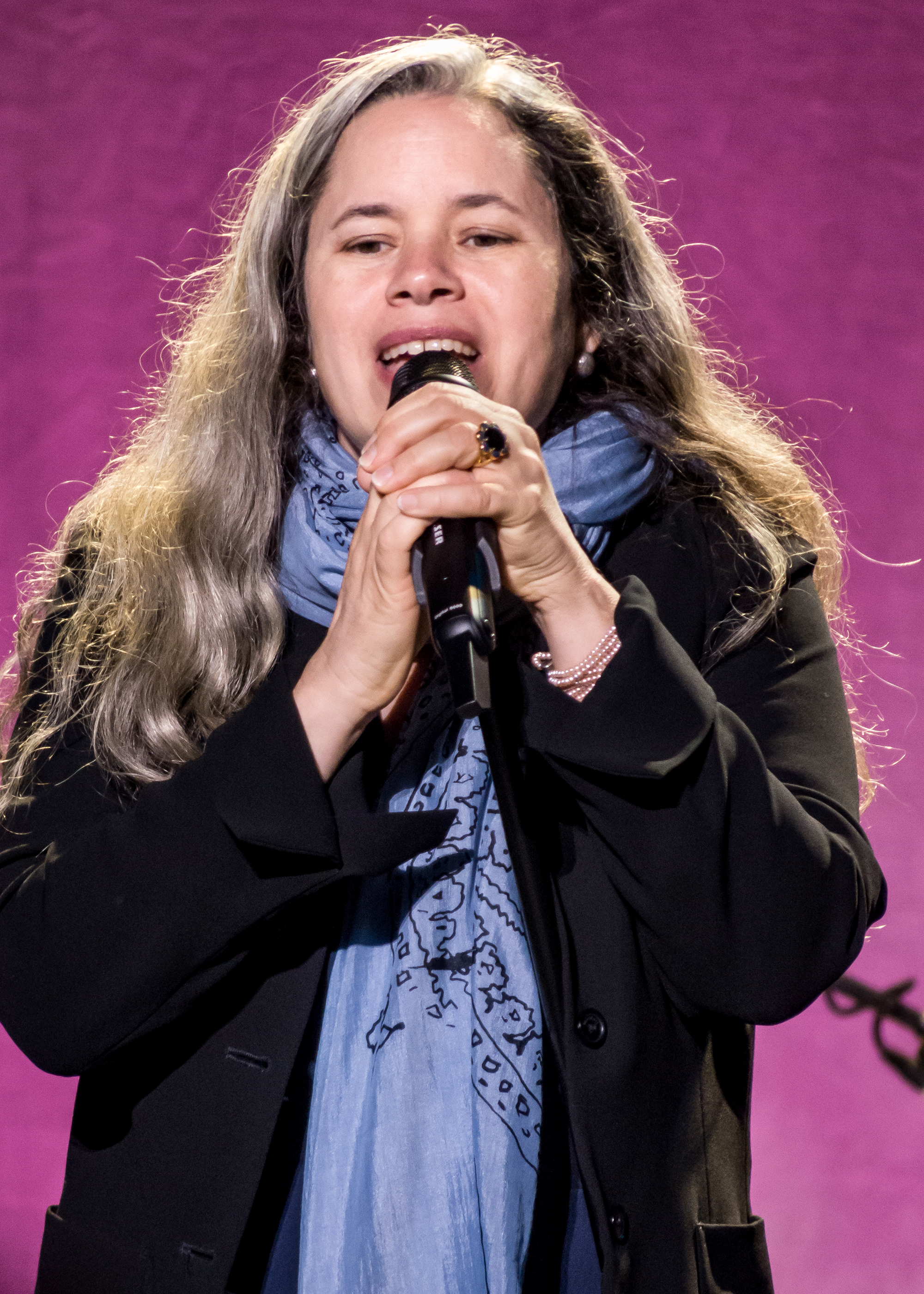
- Merchant performing in 2017
- Born: Natalie Anne Merchant; October 26, 1963 (age 63); Jamestown, New York, U.S.
- Occupations: Singer; songwriter
- Years active: 1981–present
- Spouse: Daniel de la Calle (m. 2003; div. 2012)
- Children: 1
- Musical career
- Genres: Rock; folk
- Instruments: Vocals; piano
- Labels: Elektra; Myth America; Nonesuch
- Formerly of: 10,000 Maniacs
- Website: nataliemerchant.com

Natalie Anne Merchant (born October 26, 1963) is an American singer-songwriter. She joined the band 10,000 Maniacs in 1981 and was lead vocalist and primary lyricist for the group. She remained with the group for their first seven albums before leaving to begin her solo career in 1993. She has since released nine studio albums as a solo artist.

== Early life ==
Natalie Merchant was born October 26, 1963, in Jamestown, New York, the third of four children of Anthony and Anne Merchant (née Meyer). Her paternal grandfather, who played the accordion, mandolin and guitar, emigrated to the United States from Sicily; his surname was "Mercante" before it was anglicized. Her parents divorced when she was 7. Merchant grew up Roman Catholic although she started drifting away from the faith as a teen but continues to believe in a God.

When Merchant was a child, her mother listened to music (primarily Petula Clark but also the Beatles, Al Green, Aretha Franklin) and encouraged her children to study music, but would not allow television after Merchant was 12.

"I was taken to the symphony a lot because my mother loved classical music. But I was dragged to see Styx when I was 12. We had to drive 100 miles to Buffalo, New York. Someone threw up next to me and people were smoking pot. It was terrifying. I remember Styx had a white piano which rose out of the stage. It was awe-inspiring and inspirational."

"She [her mother] had show tunes, she had the soundtrack from West Side Story and South Pacific. And then eventually... she'd always liked classical music and then she married a jazz musician, so that's the kind of music I was into. I never really had friends who sat around and listened to the stereo and said 'hey, listen to this one', so I'd never even heard of who Bob Dylan was until I was 18."

Merchant says she did not have a television set growing up: "I grew up in a house where no one watched the news on television and no one read the paper. I've been discovering these things as I get older, and the news has affected me more than it ever has before."

Merchant started working in a health food store at age 16. She considered a career in special education after taking part in a summer program for disabled children, but in 1981, she started singing for a band, Still Life, which became 10,000 Maniacs.

== Career ==
=== 10,000 Maniacs ===
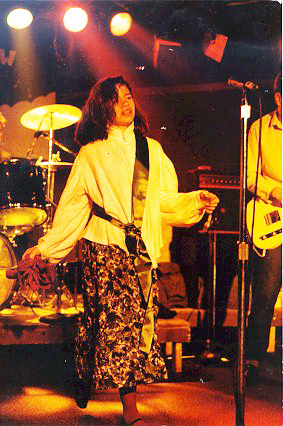
Merchant in 1984. Merchant became known for her swirling style of dancing and her simple dress while performing with 10,000 Maniacs.

Merchant was lead singer and primary lyricist for 10,000 Maniacs, joining in its infancy in 1981 while she was a student at Jamestown Community College. The group recorded their first album Human Conflict Number Five, and recorded a corresponding music video at the Hotel Franklin and at Group W Westinghouse studios in Jamestown, New York, in 1982. Merchant sang lead vocals, and later played the piano as well on seven studio albums with 10,000 Maniacs. In 1993 she announced that she was leaving the group, citing a lack of creative control over the music she wrote with the band. Her last recording with the band, a cover of Bruce Springsteen's and Patti Smith's "Because the Night" at the 10,000 Maniacs MTV Unplugged performance, reached No. 11 on the Hot 100 chart on February 18, 1994, becoming the band's highest-charting song in the U.S.

=== Tigerlily (1995) ===
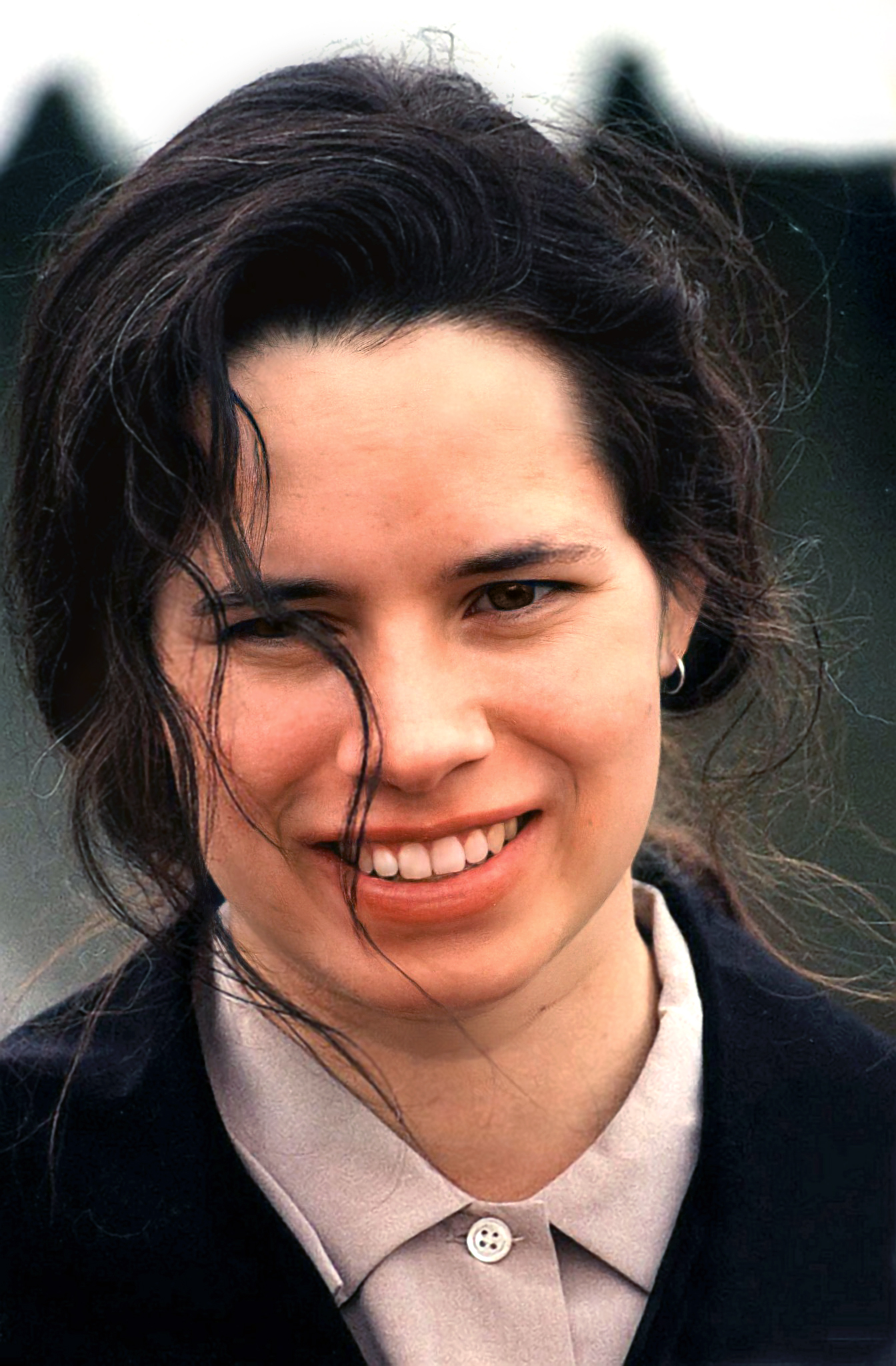
Merchant in 1995 at Earth Day in Columbia, Maryland

After her split with 10,000 Maniacs, Merchant was so eager to begin writing her own material that she went home that very day and composed the song "I May Know the Word", which was originally meant to appear on the soundtrack to the Tom Hanks movie Philadelphia. The song was eventually cut from the soundtrack, but it would go on to appear on Merchant's debut solo album, Tigerlily, which was released on the Elektra label in 1995. The third song on the album, "Beloved Wife", was featured as the first song in the trailer for the film Message in a Bottle.

Tigerlily was a critical and commercial success, spawning her first Top 10 hit in the single "Carnival", and achieving Top 40 success with subsequent singles "Wonder" and "Jealousy". The album would go on to sell more than five million copies, and continues to be Merchant's most successful album to date. She did extensive touring for it and made numerous television appearances, including performances on Saturday Night Live, at the Rock and Roll Hall of Fame, and on late-night talk shows. The media's immediate and critical effect on culture and cultural icons was of particular interest to Merchant. In "River", a song from Tigerlily, Merchant defends River Phoenix as she castigates the media for systematically dissecting the child actor after his death.

=== Ophelia (1998–1999) ===
Three years passed before Merchant released her second solo album, Ophelia. While Tigerlily contained sparse instrumentation, the music on Ophelia had lusher arrangements. The reprise at the close of the album featured a symphonic arrangement composed and conducted by British composer Gavin Bryars with whom she would collaborate nine years later to put Shakespeare's sonnets to music. Merchant treated the recording of Ophelia as a series of workshops, where she would invite various musicians she had met over the years into her home studio to collaborate and record. The name of the album and the title track are a literary reference to Shakespeare's Ophelia.

The first single off the album was "Kind and Generous", which received extensive airplay on VH1 and which solidified Merchant's role as a solo artist. That summer, Sarah McLachlan invited Merchant to co-headline the year's biggest music festival with her, Lilith Fair. The exposure from the tour helped the album reach Platinum status in just under a year, with subsequent singles "Break Your Heart" and "Life Is Sweet" receiving moderate airplay on adult contemporary stations. No video was filmed for the latter, however, with a clip from Merchant's appearance on VH1 Storytellers being used instead. She would also go on to appear on PBS' Sessions at West 54th before the year's end, and VH1's Hard Rock Live in March of 1999. In 1998, Merchant also recorded George Gershwin's "But Not for Me" for the Red Hot Organization's compilation album Red Hot + Rhapsody, a tribute to George Gershwin, which raised money for various charities devoted to increasing AIDS awareness and fighting the disease.

The Ophelia tour ended in 1999 with the final few shows being performed and recorded on Broadway. The performance would be released as the album Natalie Merchant: Live in Concert with a companion video of the same name. The performance was notable in that it featured numerous covers including songs by David Bowie, Neil Young, and Katell Keineg.

In 1998, Merchant collaborated on the making of the album Mermaid Avenue with Billy Bragg and Wilco, which set previously unreleased Guthrie lyrics to music by Bragg. She provided lead vocals for the song "Birds and Ships" and backing vocals for "Way Over Yonder in the Minor Key", and returned for the second volume of the album, 2000s Mermaid Avenue Vol. II, providing vocals on the song "I Was Born".

=== American folk music tour (2000) and Motherland (2001) ===
In 2000, Merchant embarked on a folk tour in the United States with many shows being supported by alt-country band Wilco.

Merchant's next studio album on the Elektra label was Motherland, released in 2001. Motherland saw Merchant at her most experimental musically. Motherland achieved Gold on the Billboard charts after debuting at No. 30 on the Billboard 200 and No. 13 on the Top Internet Albums of 2001, respectively. Rolling Stone favored this album with 3 1/2 stars, and also noticed a difference in Merchant's voice, which was more deep and gritty like that of Sade than her previous albums. Singles that were released from Motherland were "Just Can't Last", "Build a Levee" and "Tell Yourself".

Merchant embarked on a year-and-a-half-long world tour to promote Motherland. The first leg of the tour started in Minneapolis, Minnesota on October 17, 2001, with performances across the United States, and heading to Europe with some special acoustic shows in Europe. Merchant also participated in the Rock am Ring Festival and Rock im Park in 2002. In the summer of 2002, she was paired with Chris Isaak and played at stadiums and arenas.

=== The House Carpenter's Daughter (2003) ===
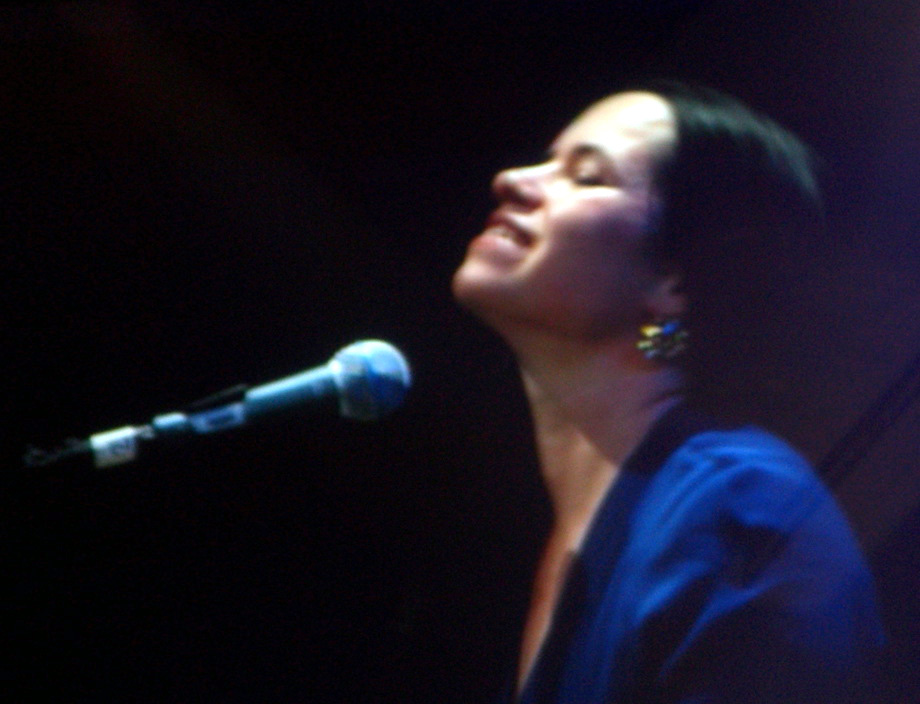
Merchant at the piano in 2005

After her contract with Elektra expired in August 2002, Merchant decided not to sign with them again, or any other major label. Her next studio album, The House Carpenter's Daughter, was released in September 2003 on her own label, Myth America Records. To date this has been the only release on Myth America.

=== Leave Your Sleep (2010) ===
In October 2009, the websites of Nonesuch Records and Natalie Merchant announced that she had signed with the label. Leave Your Sleep was released on April 13, 2010 and is a compilation of five years of inspiration from a "conversation" with her daughter over the "first 6 years of her life". The album debuted on the Billboard Top 200 at No. 17, Billboard Folk Albums at No. 1, Amazon.com at No.1, and iTunes, No. 3. The album was co-produced by Andres Levin.

Merchant contributed a recording of Buddy Holly's "Learning the Game" to the tribute album Listen to Me: Buddy Holly, released September 6, 2011.

=== Natalie Merchant (2014) ===
In February 2014, Merchant announced her eponymous album. The album consists of new works. It is her first collection of original material since 2001's Motherland. Natalie Merchant was released May 6, 2014, on Nonesuch Records and was named Album of the Week by The Daily Telegraph. The album debuted at No. 20 on Billboard's Top 200 albums and No. 2 on Billboard's Folk Albums charts for the week of May 24, 2014. She toured from July 3, 2014, kicking off in Kingston, New York, concluding at the Pabst Theater in Milwaukee on July 25, 2014.

=== Paradise Is There: The New Tigerlily Recordings (2015) ===
In 2015, Merchant released an album of new recordings of the songs from her multi-platinum solo album. She enhanced many of the tracks with strings and stripped others bare. She says: "The distance this music traveled once it left my hands is humbling, and I am moved by how many lives it has touched along the way."

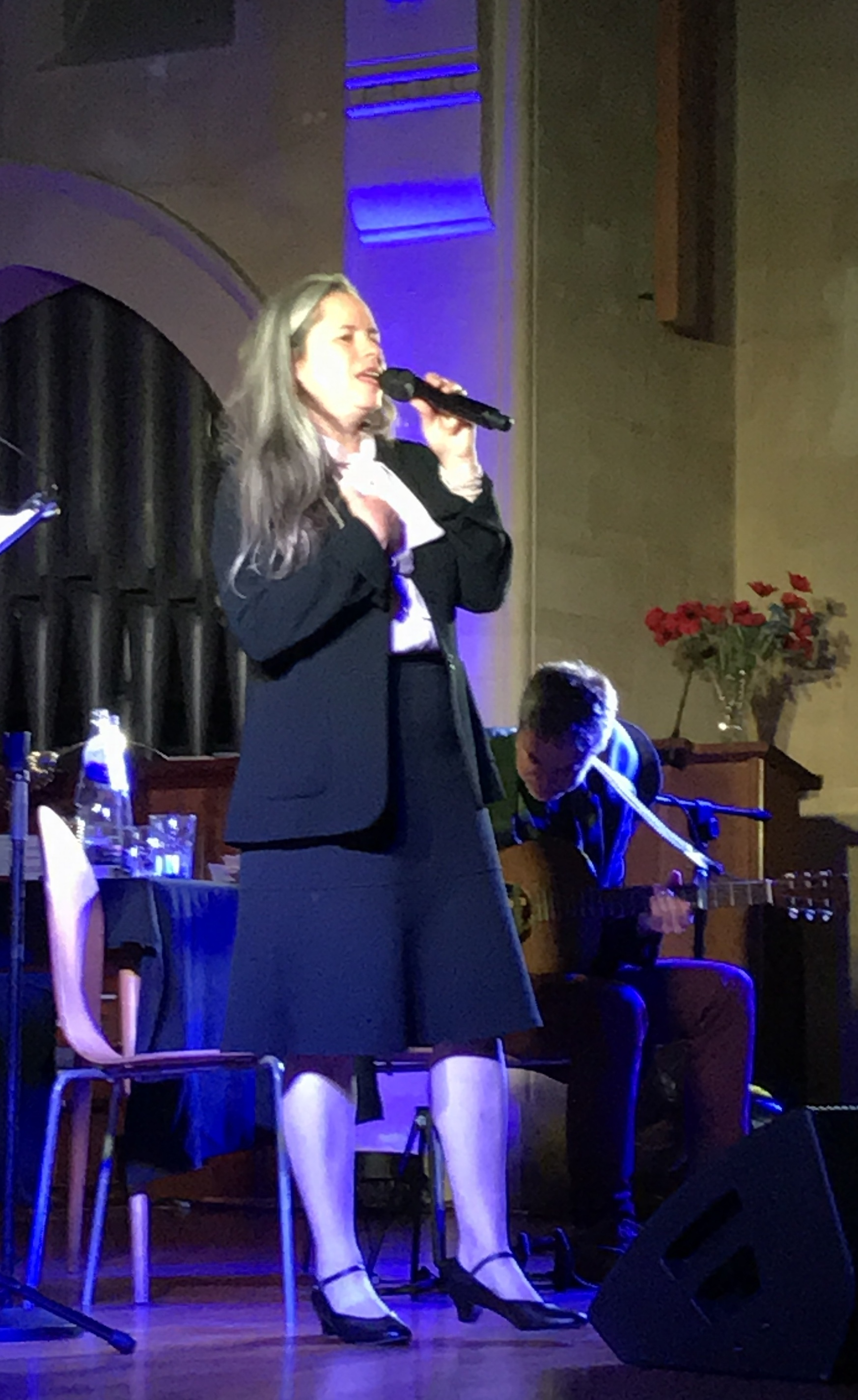
Merchant performing with guitarist Erik Della Penna at Emmanuel United Reformed Church in Cambridge, England, in July 2018

=== Butterfly (2017) ===
In 2017, Merchant released Butterfly, a collection of new songs and orchestral versions of previously recorded songs.

=== Keep Your Courage (2023) ===
On April 14, 2023, Merchant released her eighth studio album, Keep Your Courage, via Nonesuch Records. It was her first album with new material since her 2014 eponymous album Natalie Merchant.

In 2025, Merchant appeared in the feature documentary Lilith Fair: Building a Mystery – The Untold Story , which reflects on the legacy of the all-female music festival.

=== Cabinet of Wonder (2026) ===
Merchant released a digital album, A Cabinet of Wonder, on August 21, 2026. The album, a collaboration with the Chicago Symphony Orchestra and Chicago Children’s Theatre, is made up of a collection of seventeen songs and accompanying videos reimagining Mother Goose rhymes for a new generation, as well as three originals by Merchant.

== Personal life ==
Merchant met Michael Stipe of the band R.E.M. in 1983. The two became close friends and eventually had a romantic relationship. They credit each other as inspirations for some of their songwriting. In an interview with The Independent, Stipe said, "Natalie was really the reason my work became politicised in the late Eighties."

In 2003, Merchant married Daniel de la Calle and had a daughter. In an interview in 2012, Merchant indicated that she was divorced. She lives in Rhinecliff, New York.

Merchant enjoys gardening and painting. Some of her paintings can be seen on her website. She has been a vegetarian since 1980, except for the duration of her pregnancy, when she temporarily resumed eating meat. In 1997, she said:

The '60s aesthetic has never really appealed to me, the tie-dyed Deadhead running barefoot through the forest on LSD. I don't think that's really me. But I've been a vegetarian for 17 years, and I consider myself an environmentalist inasmuch as I can be, considering the job that I have. I prefer living in the countryside rather than the city—I find it more sane and sustaining for myself.

After suffering ossification of the posterior longitudinal ligament in 2019, Merchant received surgery for the condition, leaving her unable to sing for several months.

She now teaches arts and crafts to underprivileged children in New York state. It was during this time in Troy, New York, that she built the foundation of what became by 2023 the Cabinet of Wonder, a web-based multimedia project based on the Mother Goose collection. It is a collaboration with the Chicago Symphony Orchestra, Chicago Children’s Theatre and Manual Cinema and part of a pilot experiment with the National Head Start Association and Chicago Public Schools.

== Activism ==
In 2012, Merchant, along with actor and writer Mark Ruffalo, organized a concert to protest against oil and gas fracking in New York state. A documentary, written and directed by Jon Bowermaster, was made of the event and titled Dear Governor Cuomo. She directed a short 2013 documentary titled Shelter: A Concert Film to Benefit Victims of Domestic Violence, that shone light on a group of women living in the mid-Hudson region of New York State responding to the crisis of domestic violence in their community with compassion and creativity. It was inspired by an event for One Billion Rising, a global campaign calling for an end to violence against women, held on February 14, 2013. Merchant presented a screening of the film at the Old Dutch Church in Kingston, New York, on the day of One Billion Rising for Justice.

Merchant, an outspoken critic of then-President-elect Donald Trump, participated in an anti-Trump protest organized by Ruffalo and Michael Moore, held outside Trump International Hotel and Tower in New York City on January 19, 2017. Merchant performed her single "Motherland". She concluded the event with a group sing-along of Woody Guthrie's "This Land Is Your Land". The event was covered by CNN and broadcast live.

Merchant is a member of the Canadian charity Artists Against Racism and has worked with them in the past on awareness campaigns.

== Awards and nominations ==
Award	Year	Nominee(s)	Category	Result	Ref.
ASCAP Pop Music Awards	1997	"Carnival"	Most Performed Songs	Won	
ASCAP Pop Music Awards	1997	"Wonder"	Most Performed Songs	Won	
ASCAP Pop Music Awards	1997	"Jealousy"	Most Performed Songs	Won	
ASCAP Pop Music Awards	1999	"Kind & Generous"	Most Performed Songs	Won	
Cash Box Year-End Awards	1994	10,000 Maniacs	Top Alternative Crossover Artist	Nominated	
Cash Box Year-End Awards	1994	MTV Unplugged	Top Pop Album	Nominated	
Cash Box Year-End Awards	1995	Herself	Top Pop/Rock Female Artist	Nominated	
Cash Box Year-End Awards	1995	Herself	Top Alternative Female Artist	Nominated	
Cash Box Year-End Awards	1995	Tigerlily	Top Pop Album	Nominated	
Pollstar Concert Industry Awards	1990	10,000 Maniacs	Small Hall Tour of the Year	Nominated	
Pollstar Concert Industry Awards	1990	10,000 Maniacs	Surprise Hot Ticket Of The Year	Nominated	
Pollstar Concert Industry Awards	1990	10,000 Maniacs	Next Major Arena Headliner	Nominated	
Pollstar Concert Industry Awards	1996	Herself	Small Hall Tour Of The Year	Nominated	
UK Festival Awards	2010	Cambridge Folk Festival	Best Headline Performance	Nominated	

== Discography ==
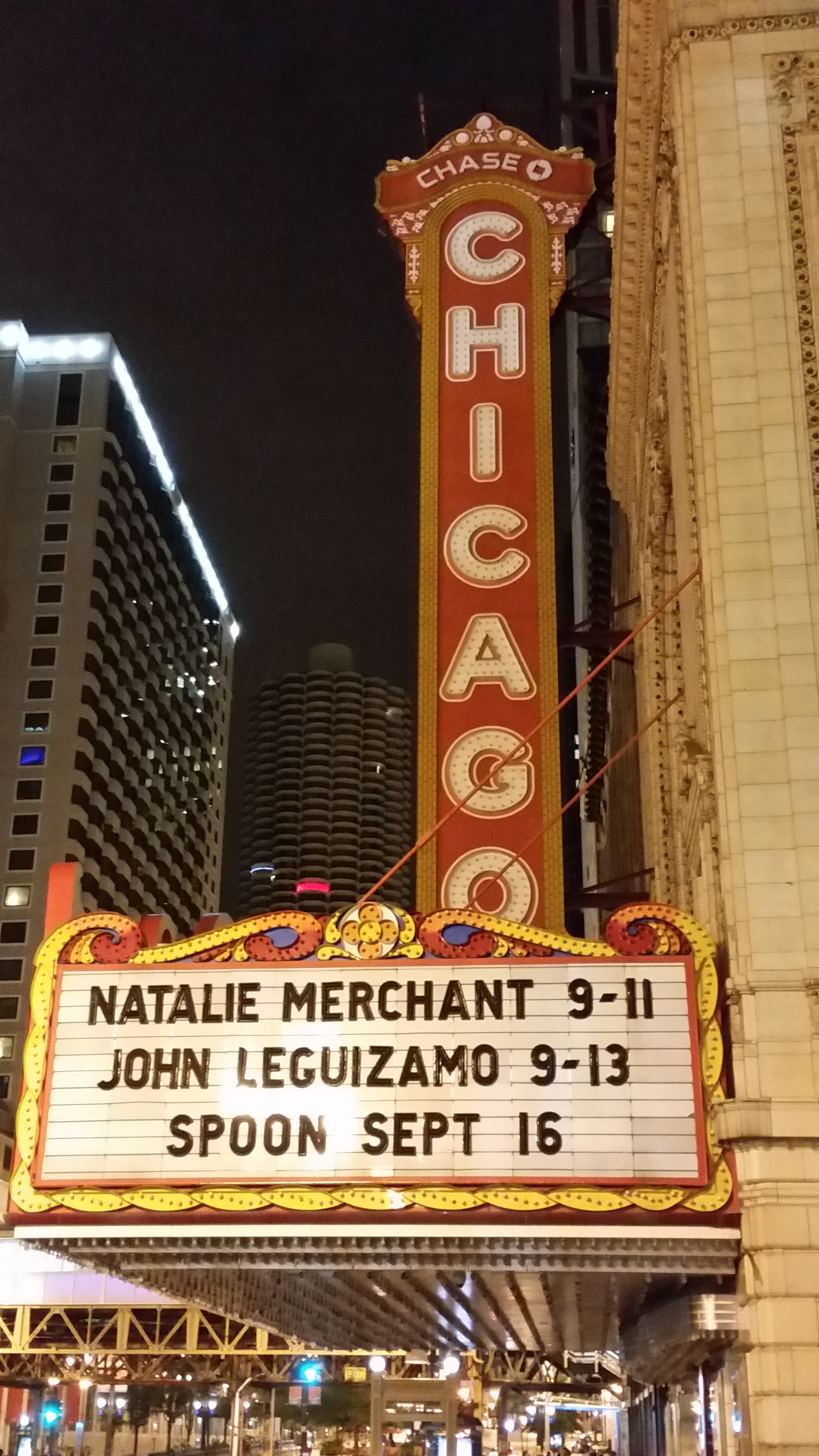
Merchant appearing at the Chicago Theatre in September 2014

=== With 10,000 Maniacs ===
- Human Conflict Number Five (EP) (1982)
- Secrets of the I Ching (1983)
- The Wishing Chair (1985)
- In My Tribe (1987)
- Blind Man's Zoo (1989)
- Hope Chest: The Fredonia Recordings 1982–1983 (1990)
- Our Time in Eden (1992)
- MTV Unplugged (1993)
- Campfire Songs: The Popular, Obscure and Unknown Recordings (2004)

=== Solo ===
- 1995: Tigerlily
- 1998: Ophelia
- 2001: Motherland
- 2003: The House Carpenter's Daughter
- 2010: Leave Your Sleep
- 2014: Natalie Merchant
- 2015: Paradise Is There: The New Tigerlily Recordings
- 2017: Butterfly
- 2023: Keep Your Courage
- 2026: Cabinet of Wonder

== Filmography ==
=== Films ===
Year	Title	Role	Notes
1990	Time Capsule	Herself (vocals, piano, organ)	Video documentary
1996	One Fine Day	Performer "One Fine Day"	Soundtrack
1998	Ophelia	Performer	Short film
1999	Bringing Out the Dead	Performer/writer: "These Are Days"	Soundtrack
1999	Natalie Merchant: Live in Concert	Herself (vocals, piano)	Live concert video
2002	When in Rome	Performer/writer: "These Are Days"	Soundtrack
2003	Cheaper by the Dozen	Performer/writer: "These Are Days"	Soundtrack
2004	Purgatory House	Performer/writer: "My Skin"	Soundtrack
2005	Earthlings	Composer	Documentary
2006	Candida	Performer/writer: "Motherland"	Soundtrack
2025	Lilith Fair: Building a Mystery	Herself	Documentary

=== Television ===
Year	Title	Role	Notes
1985	The Tube	Herself (as 10,000 Maniacs)	(Channel 4) "My Mother the War" and "Can't Ignore the Train"
1988	Saturday Night Live	Herself (as 10,000 Maniacs)	(NBC) Aired February 27, 1988; "Peace Train" and "Like the Weather"
1989	The Arsenio Hall Show	Herself (as 10,000 Maniacs)	(CBS) "Eat for Two"
1990	MTV Unplugged	Herself (as 10,000 Maniacs)	(MTV)
1992	Saturday Night Live	Herself (as 10,000 Maniacs)	(NBC) "Candy Everybody Wants" and "These Are Days"
1993	MTV Unplugged	Herself (as 10,000 Maniacs)	(MTV) First artist to make second appearance
1993	Rock & Roll Inaugural Ball	Herself (as 10,000 Maniacs)	
1993	MTV Video Music Awards	Herself – presenter	(MTV) TV special
1995	Concert for Rock and Roll Hall of Fame	Herself – performer	"I Know How to Do It"
1995	Saturday Night Live	Herself – performer	(NBC) Host David Schwimmer
1996	Late Show with David Letterman	Herself – performer	(NBC) Host David Letterman "Wonder"
1997	Sessions at West 54th	Herself – performer	(PBS) "Planctus" with Philip Glass
1998	Saturday Night Live	Herself – performer	(NBC) Host Matthew Broderick
1998	Hard Rock Live	Herself – performer	(VH1)
1998	VH1 Storytellers	Herself – performer	(VH1) Later released as DVD
1998	Sessions at West 54th	Herself – performer	(NBC) Host David Byrne
1999	Man in the Sand	Herself	Video documentary
1999	Late Night with Conan O'Brien	Musical guest	(NBC) "Life Is Sweet"
1999	Lifetime's Intimate Portrait	Herself	(Lifetime) Biographical
2000	ABC 2000: The Millennium	Herself – performer	(ABC) "Kind and Generous"
2001	Come Together: A Night for John Lennon's Words & Music	Herself – performer	"Nowhere Man"
2001	Up Close and Personal	Herself – performer	(Oxygen)
2002	Austin City Limits	Herself – performer	(PBS)
2003	Go Further	Herself	Documentary
2010	Good Morning America	Herself – performer	(ABC News)
2015	The Today Show	Herself – performer	(NBC News)
2016	The Andrew Marr Show	Herself – performer	(BBC) "Where I Go"
2019	The Tonight Show Starring Jimmy Fallon	Herself – performer	(NBC) "These Are the Days"

Talk show	Year
One Hour with Jonathan Ross	12 November 1989
The Arsenio Hall Show	1989
Late Show with David Letterman	1995, 1995, 1996, 1998, 1999, 2001, 2001, 2004
The Rosie O'Donnell Show	1996, 1996, 1998, 1998, 1999, 1999, 2001, 2002
The Tonight Show with Jay Leno	1992, 1993, 2001, 2002, 2010
The Katie Show	2014
The Tonight Show Starring Jimmy Fallon	2019
