= Adapt =

Adapt may refer to:

- ADAPT, American disability rights organisation
- ADAPT – Able Disable All People Together, disability organisation working for Neuro-Muscular and Developmental Disabilities in India since 1972
- Adapt (Trace Bundy album), 2004 Trace Bundy album
- Adapt (Sakanaction album), 2022 Sakanaction album
- Adapt: Why Success Always Starts with Failure, a book by Tim Harford

== See also ==
- Adaptation (disambiguation)
