= BMW X3 (G45) =

Fourth generation of BMW X3

BMW X3 (G45/G48)
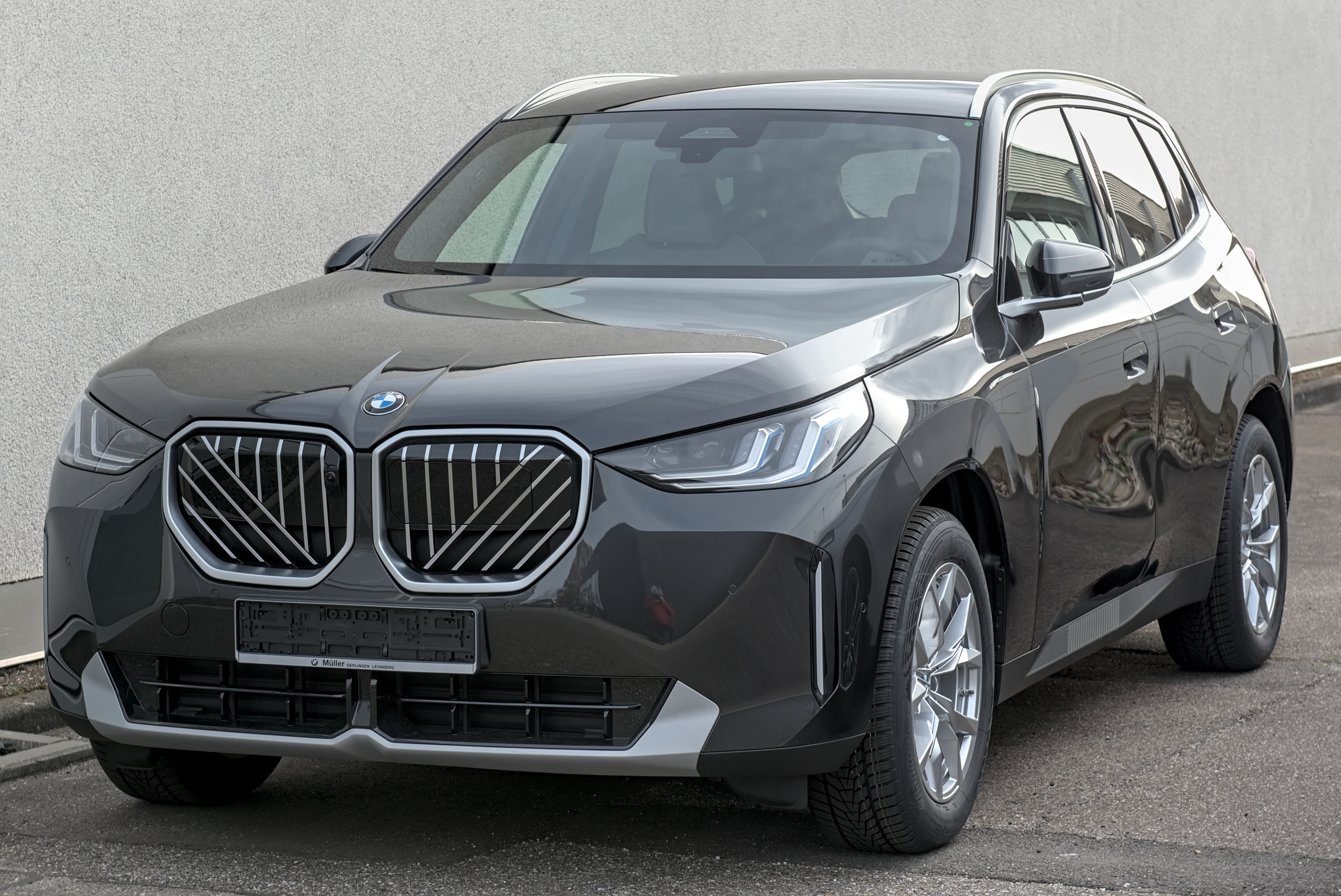
- BMW X3 20 (G45)

Overview
- Manufacturer: BMW
- Model code: G45; G48 (LWB)
- Production: August 2024 – present
- Model years: 2025–present
- Assembly: United States: Greer, South Carolina (Plant Spartanburg); South Africa: Rosslyn (BMW SA); China: Dadong (BBA, LWB); Indonesia: Jakarta (Gaya Motor); Malaysia: Kulim, Kedah (Inokom); Vietnam: Chu Lai, Quang Nam (THACO)
- Designer: Jacek Pepłowski, Martin Simmet, Serkan Budur (exterior); Misha Klimov, Erik Melldahl (interior)

Body and chassis
- Class: Compact luxury crossover SUV
- Body style: 5-door SUV
- Layout: Front-engine, rear-wheel-drive (sDrive); Front-engine, four-wheel-drive (xDrive)
- Platform: BMW CLAR platform

Powertrain
- Engine: Petrol: 2.0 L B48 I4 turbo mild hybrid; 3.0 L B58 I6 turbo mild hybrid; Petrol plug-in hybrid: 2.0 L B48 I4 turbo with electric motor; Diesel: 2.0 L B47 I4 turbo MHEV; 3.0 L B57D30b I6 turbo MHEV
- Electric motor: 135 kW (181 hp) synchronous electric motor (PHEV)
- Transmission: 8-speed ZF 8HP automatic
- Hybrid drivetrain: Mild hybrid; Plug-in hybrid
- Battery: 19.7 kWh lithium ion (PHEV)
- Electric range: 90 km (56 mi)

Dimensions
- Wheelbase: 2,865 mm (112.8 in); 2,975 mm (117.1 in) (LWB)
- Length: 4,755 mm (187.2 in); 4,865 mm (191.5 in) (LWB)
- Width: 1,920 mm (75.6 in)
- Height: 1,660 mm (65.4 in)

Chronology
- Predecessor: BMW X3 (G01)

The BMW X3 G45 is a compact luxury crossover SUV manufactured by the German automaker BMW, replacing the third-generation X3 G01, and the fourth-generation model in the BMW X3 series. Like its predecessor, the G45 X3 is based on the BMW Cluster Architecture (CLAR) platform utilising a range of mild hybrid and plug-in hybrid powertrains. However, it no longer has an electric version built on the same platform. Instead, the iX3 (NA5) is based on the Neue Klasse platform.

== Overview ==
The fourth-generation X3 G45 was unveiled on 19 June 2024, with sales commenced in late 2024 for the 2025 model year in the North American and European markets.

The X3 G45 is built at both BMW Group Plant Spartanburg (U.S) and Plant Rosslyn (South Africa) manufacturing plants, where the plug-in hybrid model of the X3 is manufactured at the latter plant for the first time. Plant Rosslyn is the sole production location for the plug-in hybrid and the 40d xDrive models for global markets, additionally the 20 petrol and 30d diesel models are built in the South Africa plant. The other X3 models, like the 30 petrol, are built in the Plant Spartanburg plant in the U.S.

=== Exterior ===
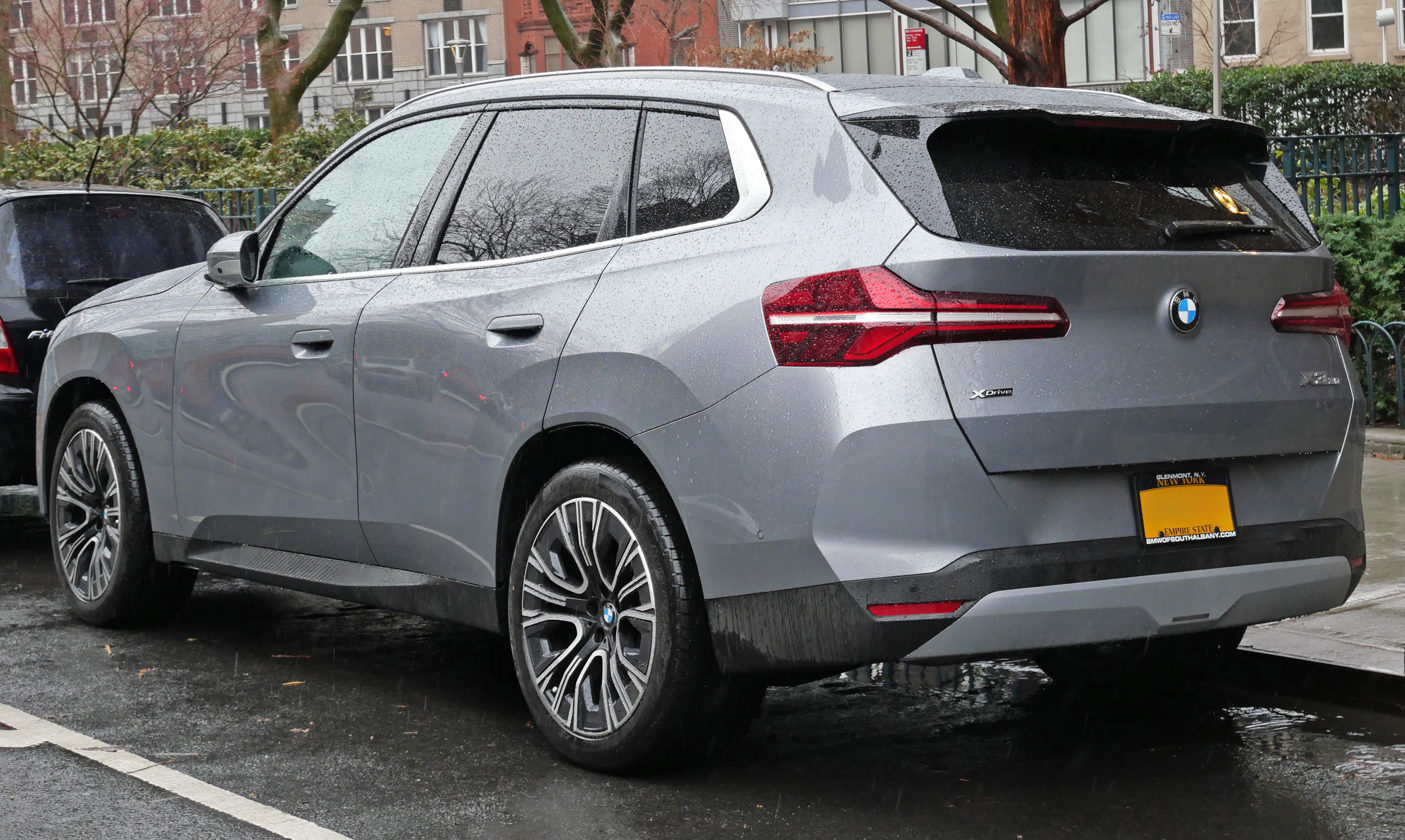
Rear view

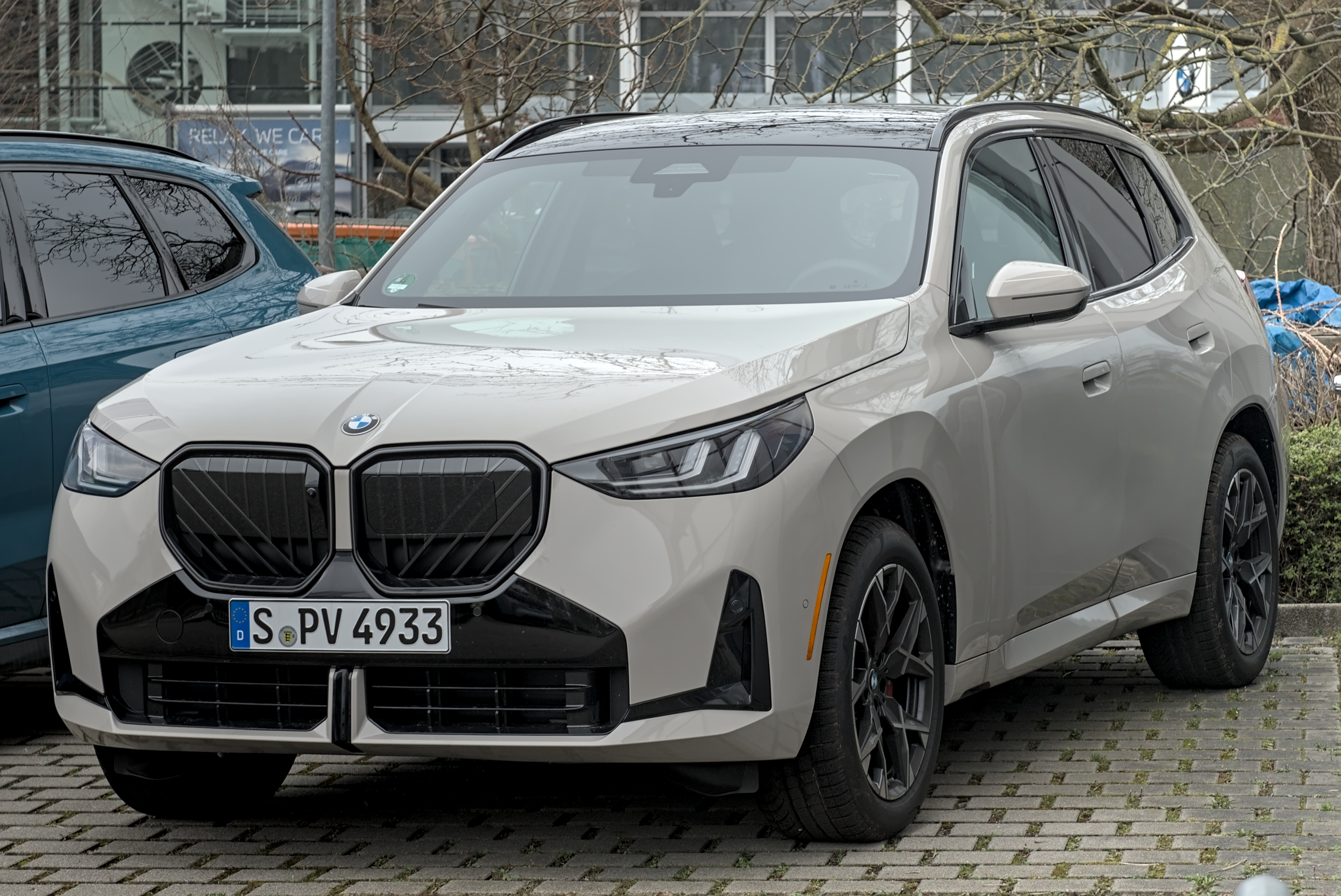
X3 xDrive 30 front view

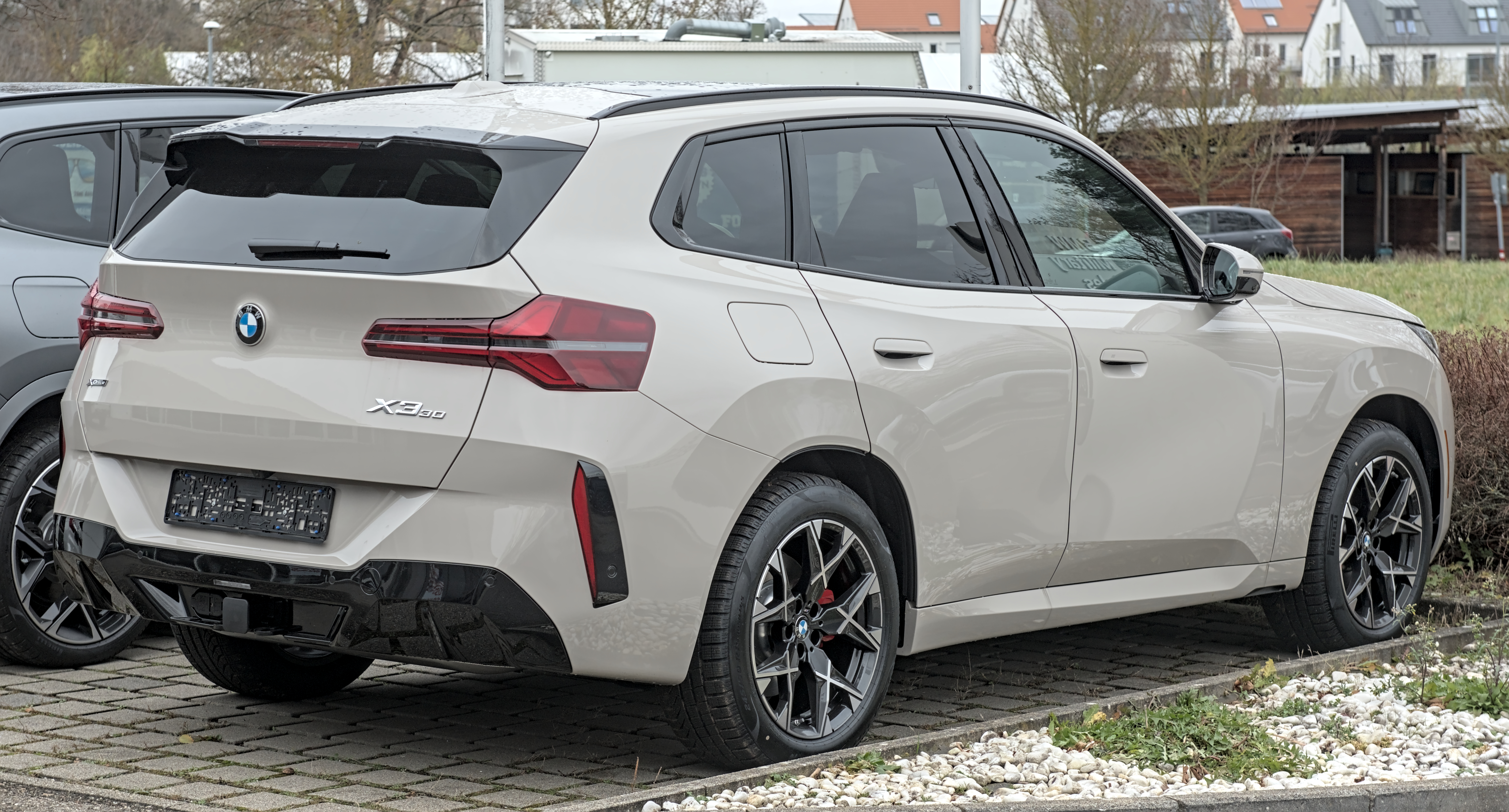
X3 xDrive 30 rear view

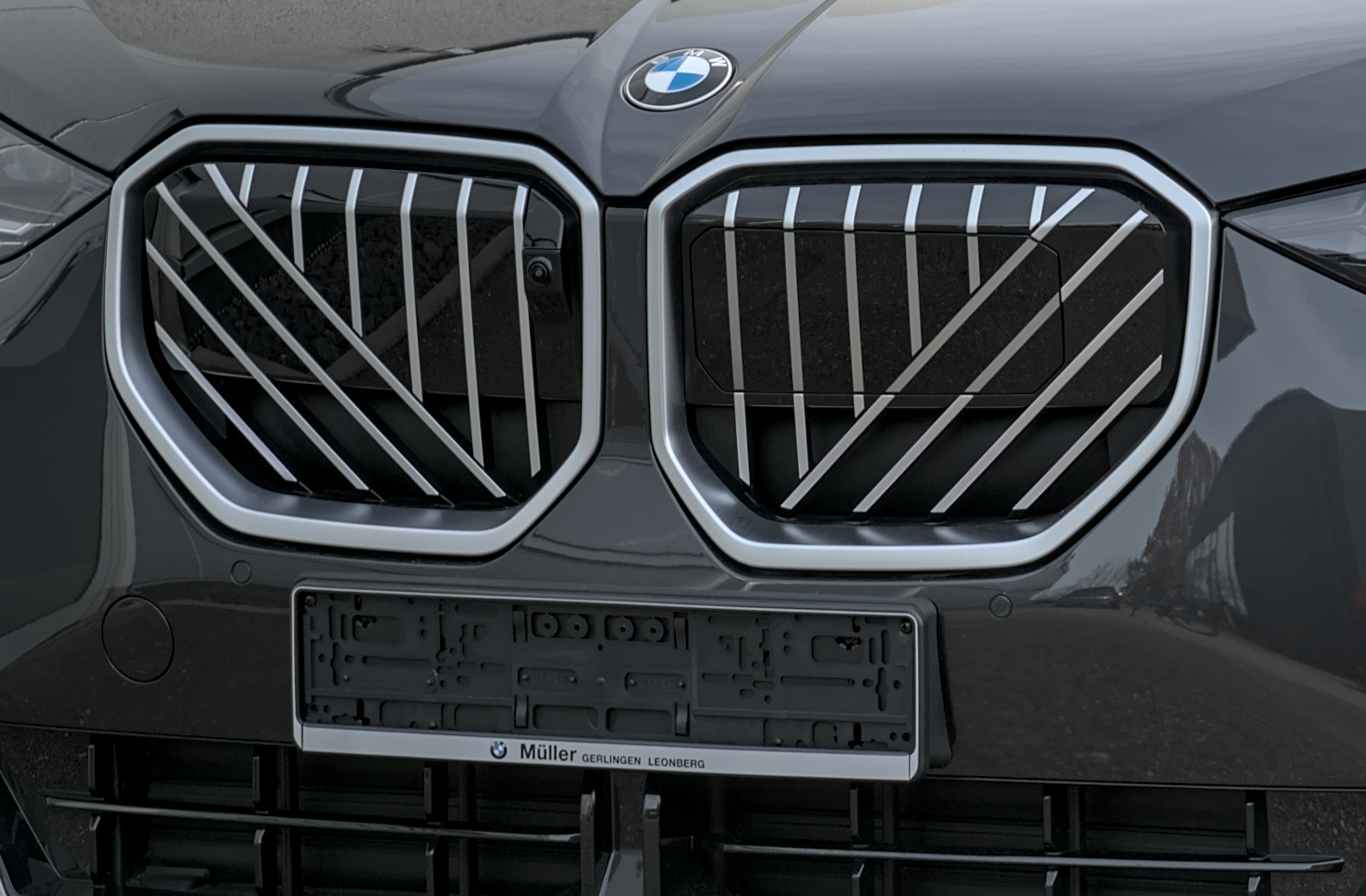
Kidney grille

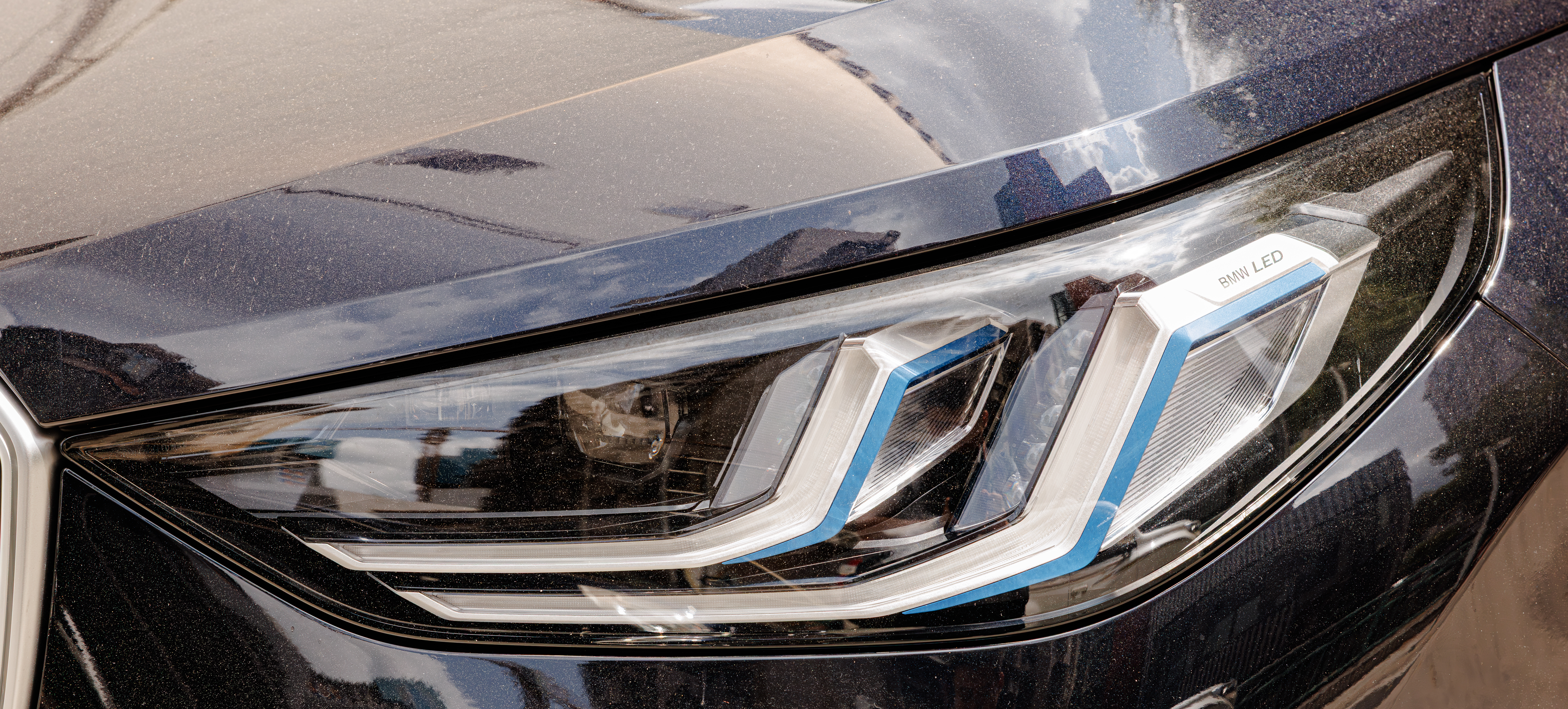
Head lamp

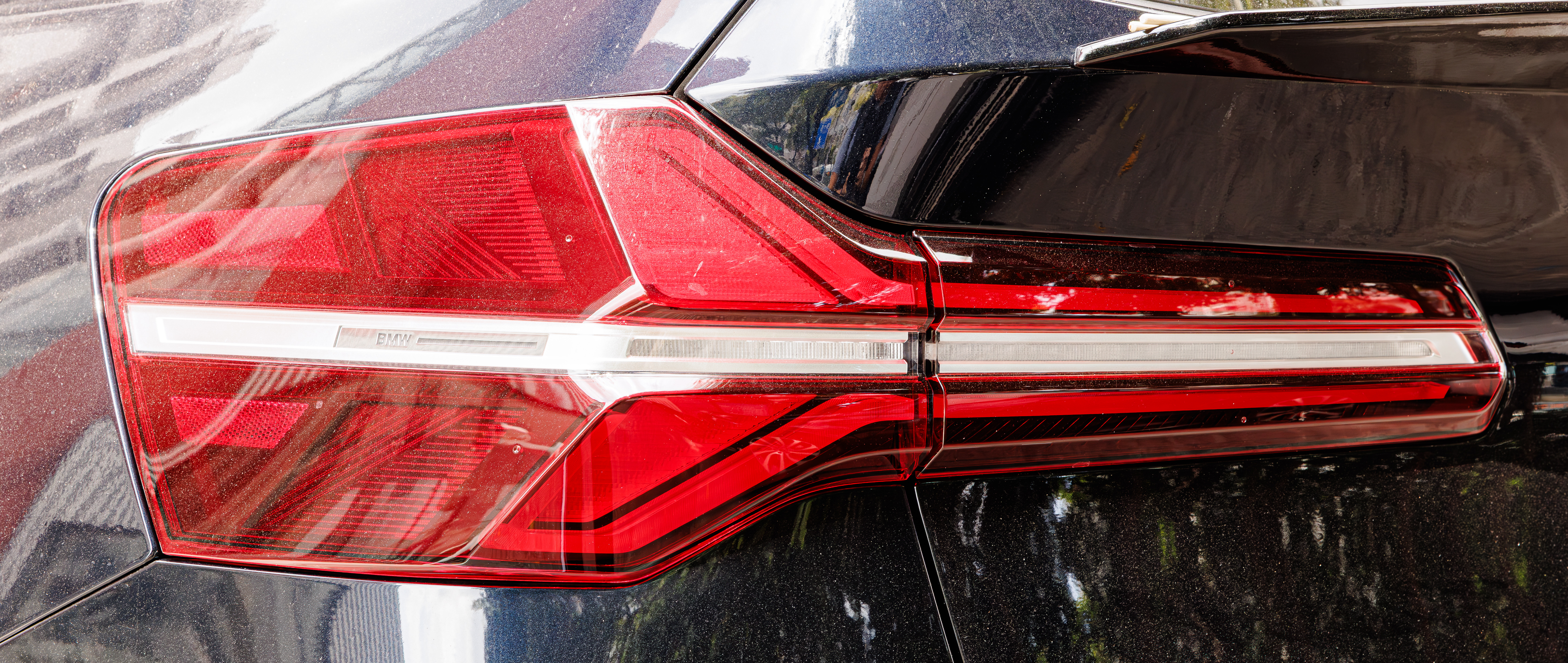
Tail lamp

The design team for the X3 G45 was led by Domagoj Dukec and the design of the production model was inspired by the BMW Vision Neue Klasse X concept that was previewed in March 2024.

The front fascia features a larger kidney grille which is available with the optional BMW Iconic Glow contour lighting and the inside of the kidney grille features vertically and diagonally arranged bars. The daytime running lights, side lights and turn signal indicators in the LED headlights are in a L-shaped. For lighting, Adaptive LED Headlights and M Shadowline lights are also available as options.

For the side, there are flush-type door handles and the brand’s signature Hofmeister kink, while the roofline and side skirt extends into the rear. For the first time, the fourth-generation X3 can also be specified with aerodynamic wheels in three different sizes (19, 20 and 21-inches). Compared to its predecessor, BMW claimed the roofline was lowered for a "more sporty silhouette."

The rear fascia carried over most of the design elements from the Neue Klasse X concept such as the indented roof spoiler with adjoining side air deflectors, the taillights features a satin horizontal bar and a T-shaped graphic with integral turn signal indicators, and the vertical accents on each side of the bumper.

=== Interior ===
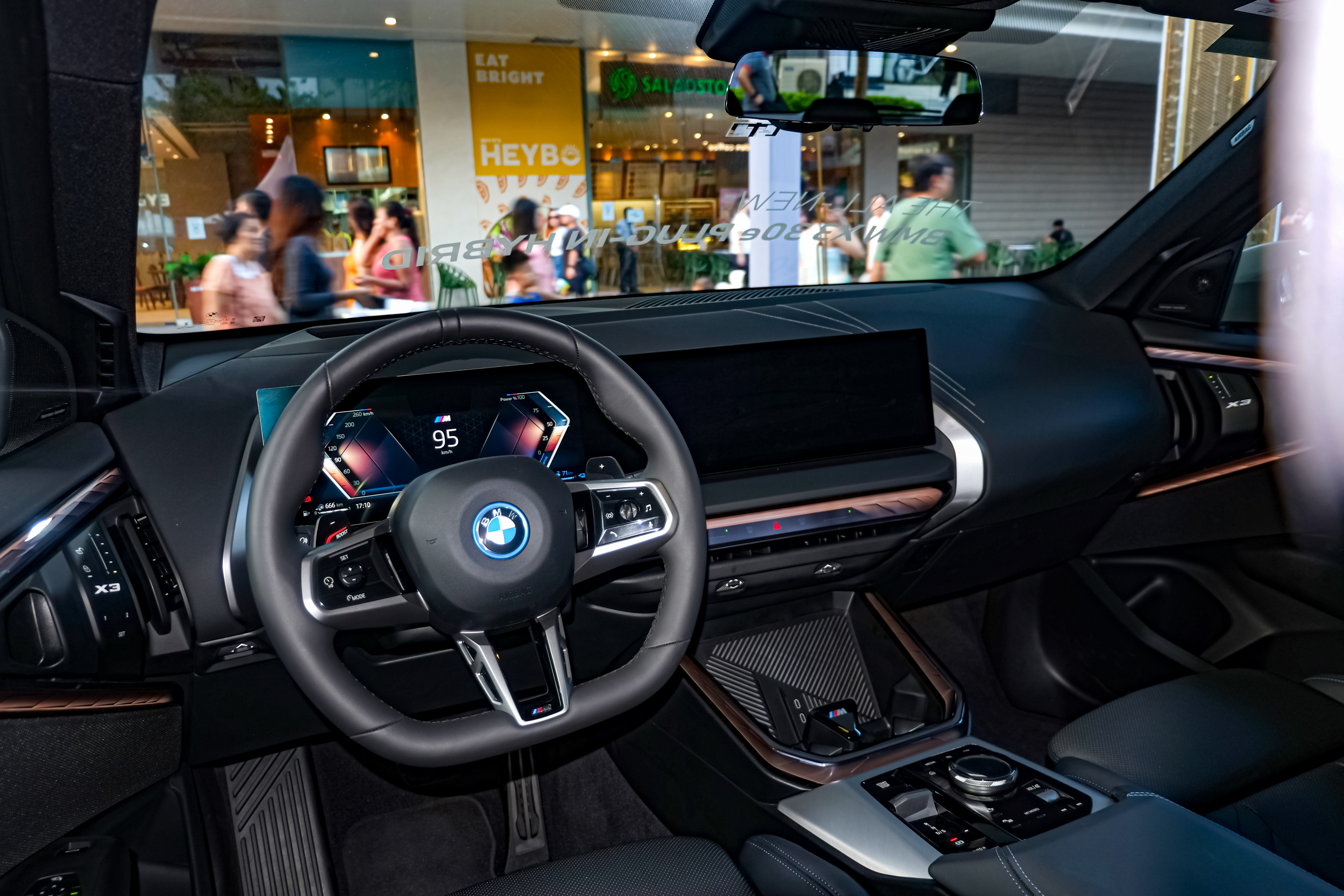
Interior

Inside, there is the full digital BMW Curved Display which consists of a 12.3-inch digital instrument cluster and a 14.9-inch iDrive 9 infotainment system, the Interaction Bar below the infotainment system, a flat-bottom designed steering wheel, the gearstick lever used for the automatic transmission, and lighting elements in a contrasting colour can be found in the centre console and on the door cards. For the first time in a BMW vehicle, there is the option of a woven fabric instrument panel made from recycled polyester.

The infotainment system is based on BMW Operating System 9, developed in-house by the BMW Group and is based on an Android Open Source Project (AOSP) software stack for the first time. The X3 G45 is the first BMW model to combine the iDrive 9 infotainment system and the rotary knob use to operate the infotainment system together. As standard, the X3 features BMW Live Cockpit Plus which uses a cloud-based BMW Maps navigation system, QuickSelect functionality and a 6-speaker audio system with a 100-watt amplifier. As an option, the X3 is available with BMW Live Cockpit Professional which includes an augmented view function and BMW Head-Up display. The BMW Digital Premium is a connected service which features audio streaming apps and the AirConsole gaming platform while the car is stationary.

The X3 G45 has a maximum boot space of 1,700 L (61.7 cu ft) when the 40:20:40 split folding rear seats are folded down. A powered tailgate comes standard, along with the standard Comfort Access feature which allows for hands-free opening and closing of the powered tailgate. A trailer coupling feature which extends and retracts electrically is an available option, and has a maximum permitted trailer load up to 2,200 kg (4,850 lb) depending on the model variant.

=== Equipment ===
M Sport and M Sport Pro packages are available options. The styling packages has features such as 19-inch M light-alloy wheels, black bars for the BMW kidney grille, M High-gloss Shadowline trim, M-specific side skirts, and a rear apron with integral diffuser element. The latter Pro package adds on a black surround and the Iconic Glow contour lighting for the BMW kidney grille, M Shadowline lights, M Sport brakes with red painted calipers, and extended M High-gloss Shadowline trim.

Standard features includes 5G mobile reception for selected markets, ambient lighting with the Welcome and Goodbye Animation, automatic dimming mechanism for the driver's side mirror and rear view mirror, BMW Intelligent Personal Assistant voice control system, Comfort Access, a full leather-free interior using Econeer upholstery made from recyclable materials, heated front seats, powered multi-way adjustments for the front seats, powered folding mechanism for the exterior door mirrors, smartphone integration via Apple CarPlay and Android Auto, three-zone automatic climate control, and wireless charging for compatible smartphones.

Optional features includes an adaptive suspension with electronically controlled dampers, BMW Head-Up Display, Harman Kardon surround sound system, heated function for the rear seats and steering wheel, M leather steering wheel, panoramic glass sunroof, powered lumbar support for the front seats, Travel & Comfort System, and Veganza and BMW Individual Merino seat upholsteries. Comfort and Premium packages are also available as options.

=== Safety ===
The X3 G45 includes standard front collision warning with brake intervention, which comprises systems such as Collision Warning, Crossroads Warning, Cruise Control with braking function and Speed Limit Info, and Lane Departure Warning with active lane return. The Driving Assistant package also comes as standard which includes Lane Change Warning with active lane return, Rear Collision Prevention, Rear Crossing Traffic Warning with braking function, and manually adjustable Speed Limit Assist. In addition, there is an exit warning function which flags up when cyclists or vehicles are approaching quickly and if any of the side doors are opened.

The optional Driving Assistant Plus also available as a BMW ConnectedDrive upgrade, with driver-assistance features usable at speeds up to 180 km/h (110 mph), an Assisted Driving View function with a 3D view of the vehicle in real time, and an automatic Speed Limit Assist. The optional Driving Assistant Professional, allows driver-assistance features usable at speeds up to 210 km/h (130 mph).

The Parking Assistant including Reversing Assistant comes standard which includes Active Park Distance Control with automatic brake inputs, a Reversing Assist Camera and the Reversing Assistant. The Parking Assistant Plus adds on a Surround View function with a 360-degree image of the vehicle and a Remote 3D View function. The Parking Assistant Professional features BMW Manoeuvre Assistant and also allows to control parking via the smartphone app.

==== ANCAP ====
ANCAP test results BMW X3 (2025, aligned with Euro NCAP)
| Test | Points | % |
|---|---|---|
| Overall: | 5 /5 stars | |
| Adult occupant: | 35.30 | 88% |
| Child occupant: | 42.52 | 86% |
| Pedestrian: | 48.82 | 77% |
| Safety assist: | 14.63 | 81% |

==== C-NCAP ====
C-NCAP (2024) test results 2025 BMW X3 xDrive30L 领先型 M Sport
| Category | | % |
|---|---|---|
| Overall: | 5 /5 stars | 85.0% |
| Occupant protection: | | 89.50% |
| Vulnerable road users: | | 78.24% |
| Active safety: | | 81.28% |

==== Euro NCAP ====
Euro NCAP test results BMW X3 20 xDrive M Sport (LHD) (2025)
| Test | Points | % |
|---|---|---|
| Overall: | 5 /5 stars | |
| Adult occupant: | 35.3 | 88% |
| Child occupant: | 41.5 | 84% |
| Pedestrian: | 48.8 | 77% |
| Safety assist: | 14.5 | 80% |

== Models ==
=== 30e ===
The 30e plug-in hybrid model uses a 2.0-litre turbocharged petrol engine, combined with a single electric motor, paired to an 8-speed Steptronic automatic transmission. The 30e model produces a combined power output 295 hp (299 PS; 220 kW) and 450 N⋅m (332 lb⋅ft) of torque. The electric motor produces 181 hp (184 PS; 135 kW) and 249 N⋅m (184 lb⋅ft) of torque. The letter "e" in the 30e model name denote the BMW eDrive technology used in the model’s plug-in hybrid drive.

The high-voltage battery provides 19.7 kWh of usable energy and uses the fifth-generation BMW eDrive technology. The 30e model has a claimed electric range up to 90 km (56 mi) based on the WLTP driving cycle, and the battery equipped with the Combined Charging Unit (CCU) allows the battery to be charged at 11 kW from empty in a duration of 2 hours and 15 minutes.

The 30e model comes as standard with an acoustic pedestrian protection system, BMW IconicSounds Electric with specific sound effects upon pressing the accelerator pedal, eDrive Zones function automatically switch into Electric mode when driving in designated low-emission zones or urban areas, and a pre-conditioning function for the vehicle.

The maximum boot capacity on the 30e model is reduced to 1,600 L (56.5 cu ft), because of the placement of the battery mounted on the rear axle.

=== M50 ===
Unlike its predecessor, BMW confirmed that the flagship M high-performance model will not be produced for the X3 G45, therefore the M Performance M50 model served as the highest performance internal combustion model of the X3 G45. BMW instead focused on developing the M model of the battery electric iX3.

The M50 features 20-inch M light alloy wheels, an M specific kidney grille with horizontal slats and comes standard with BMW Iconic Glow contour lighting, an adaptive M Sport suspension with variable sport steering, M specific quad exhaust system, M Sport braking system, and an M Sport differential on the rear axle. For Europe, the M50 is detuned to 375 hp (380 PS; 280 kW) due to strict European emission standards.

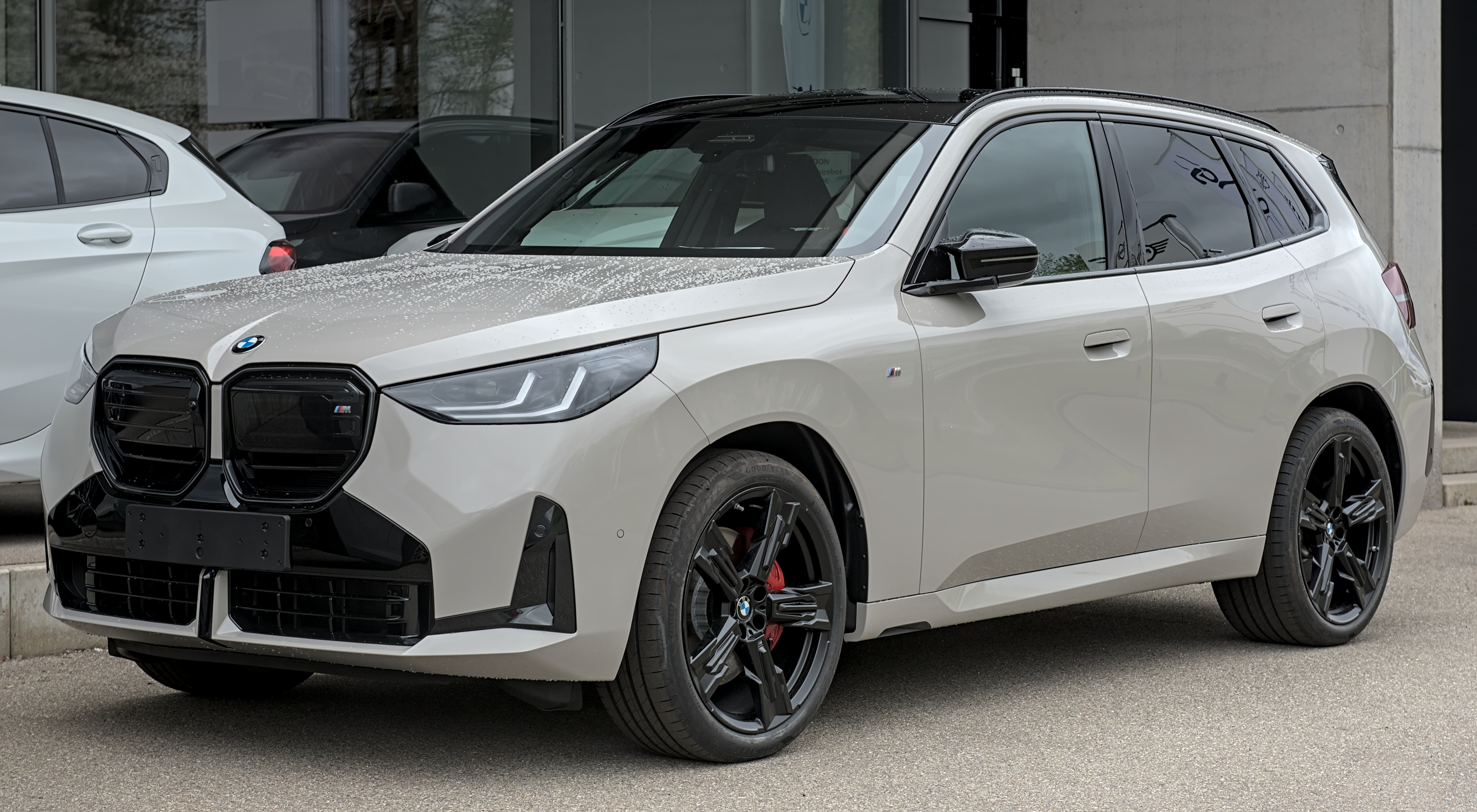
X3 M50 front view

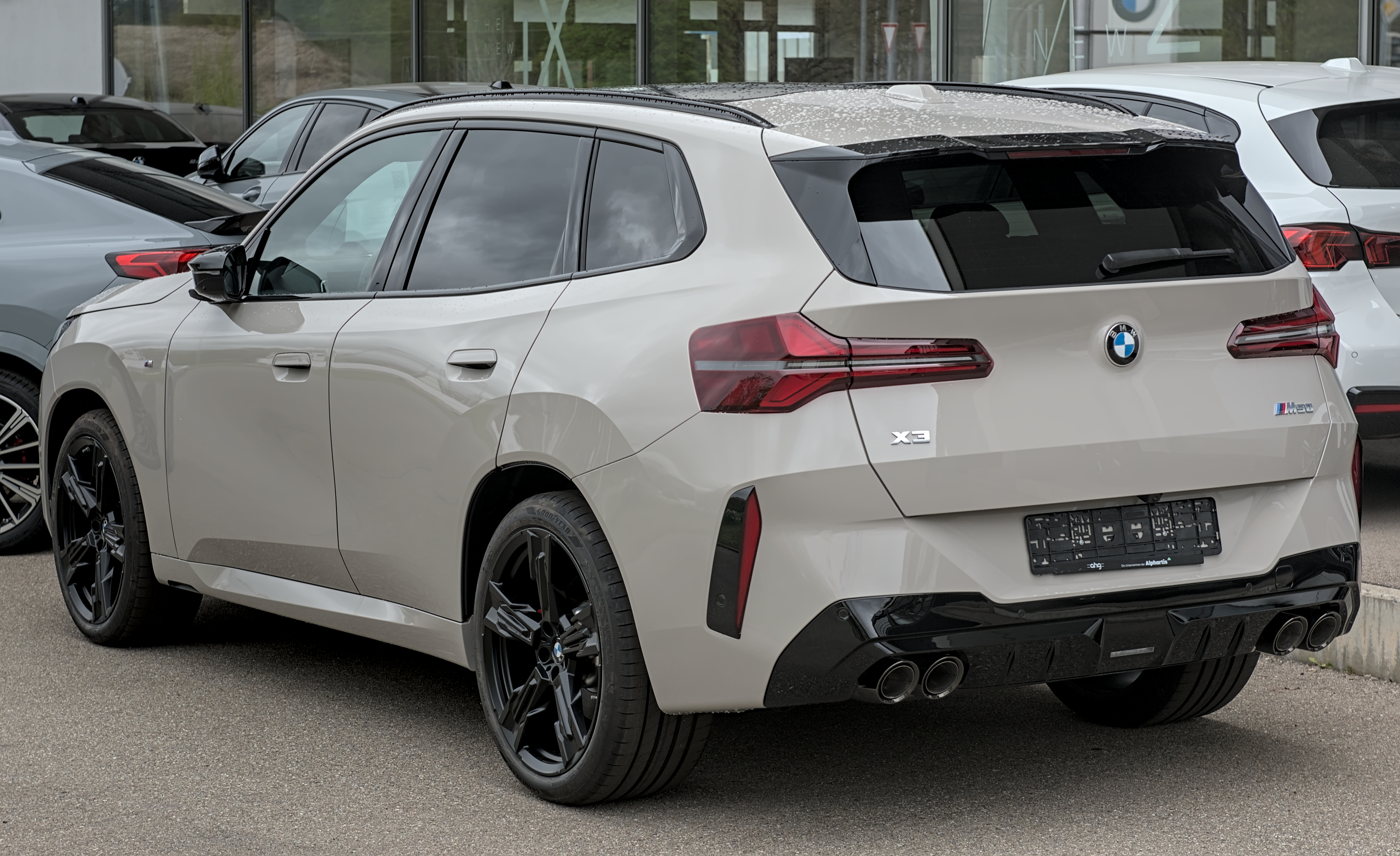
X3 M50 rear view

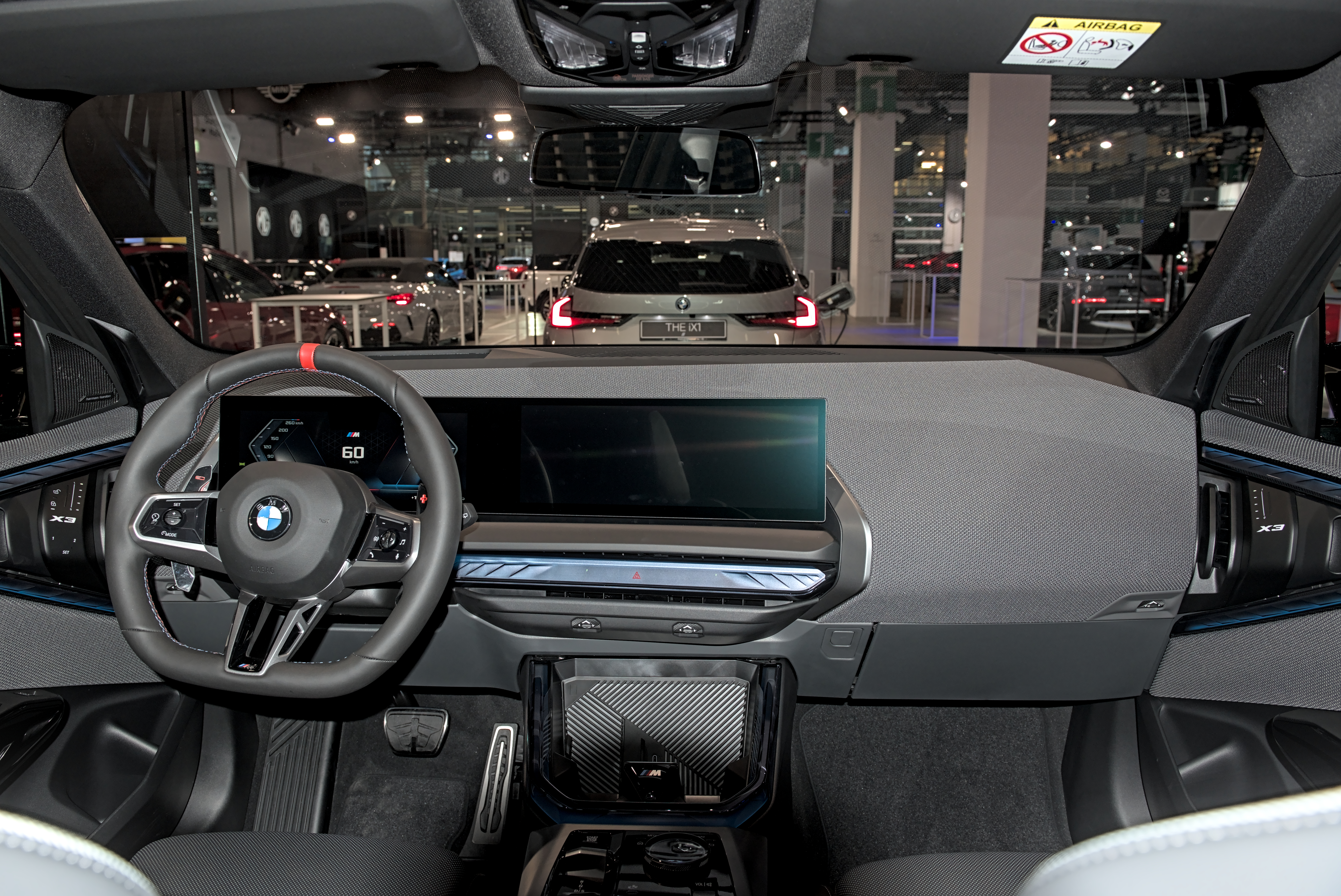
Interior

=== X3 L (G48) ===
For the first time in the model history, the X3 is available with a long wheelbase (LWB) version exclusive for the Chinese market, codenamed G48, was unveiled on 7 August 2024, and sales commenced in February 2025. The X3 G48 produced exclusively at the Plant Lydia in Shenyang, China, as part of its joint venture with Brilliance Automotive.

The wheelbase has been increased by 110 mm (4.3 in) to 2,975 mm (117.1 in) compared to the standard model, also its length is 4,865 mm (191.5 in), therefore the X3 long wheelbase (LWB) became the largest model in its segment. The X3 G48 features an illuminated kidney grille, longer rear doors, ambient lighting for the rear occupants, the BMW iDrive OS 9 with China-specific content, crystal finish on certain interior controls, the rear seats features extra cushioning, pillows and thigh support extensions, and a panoramic sunroof with illuminated pattern that mimics the kidney grille design. The X3 G48 is available with two powertrains: xDrive25L and xDrive30L, both powered by 2.0-litre inline-4 turbocharged petrol engines.

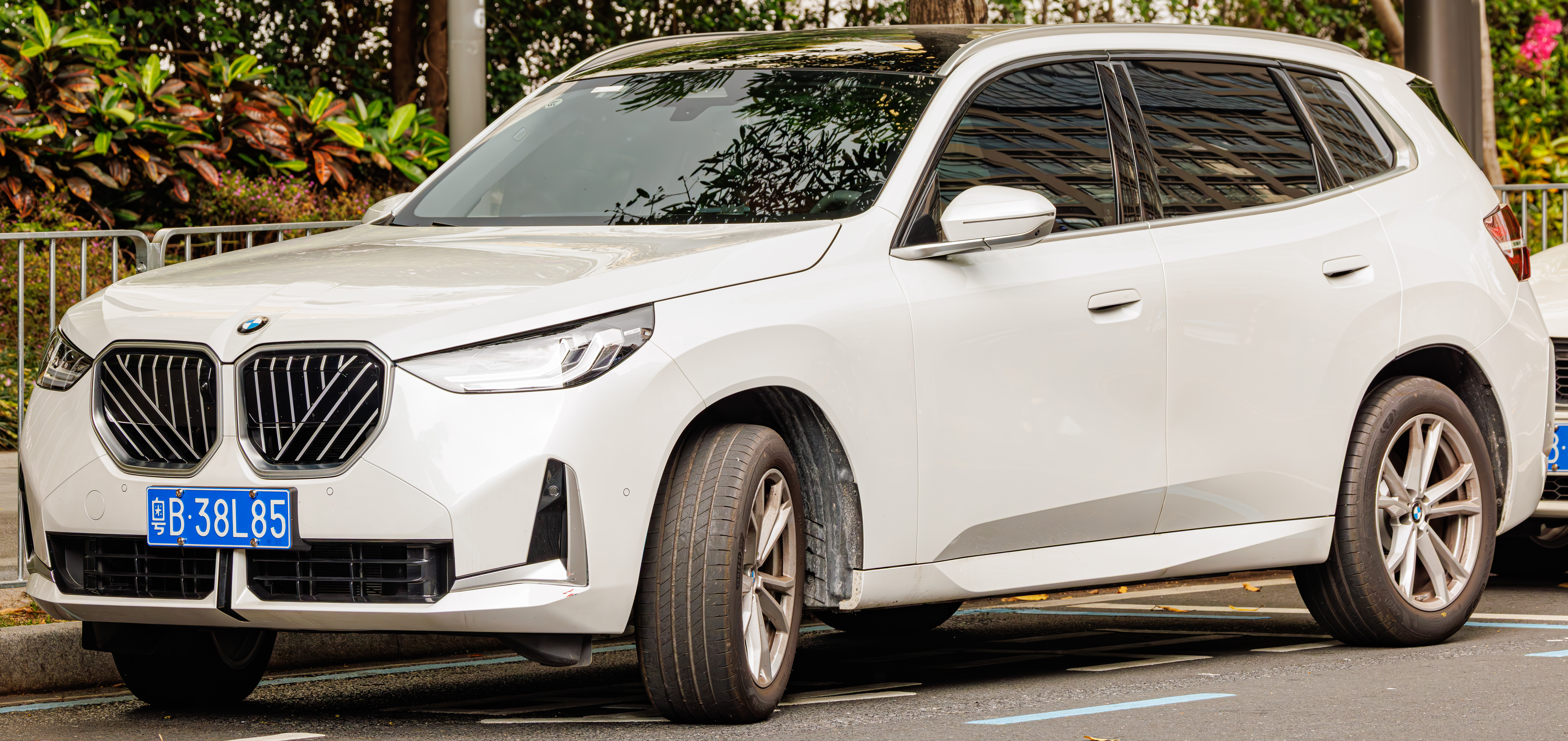
X3 xDrive25L Luxury Line

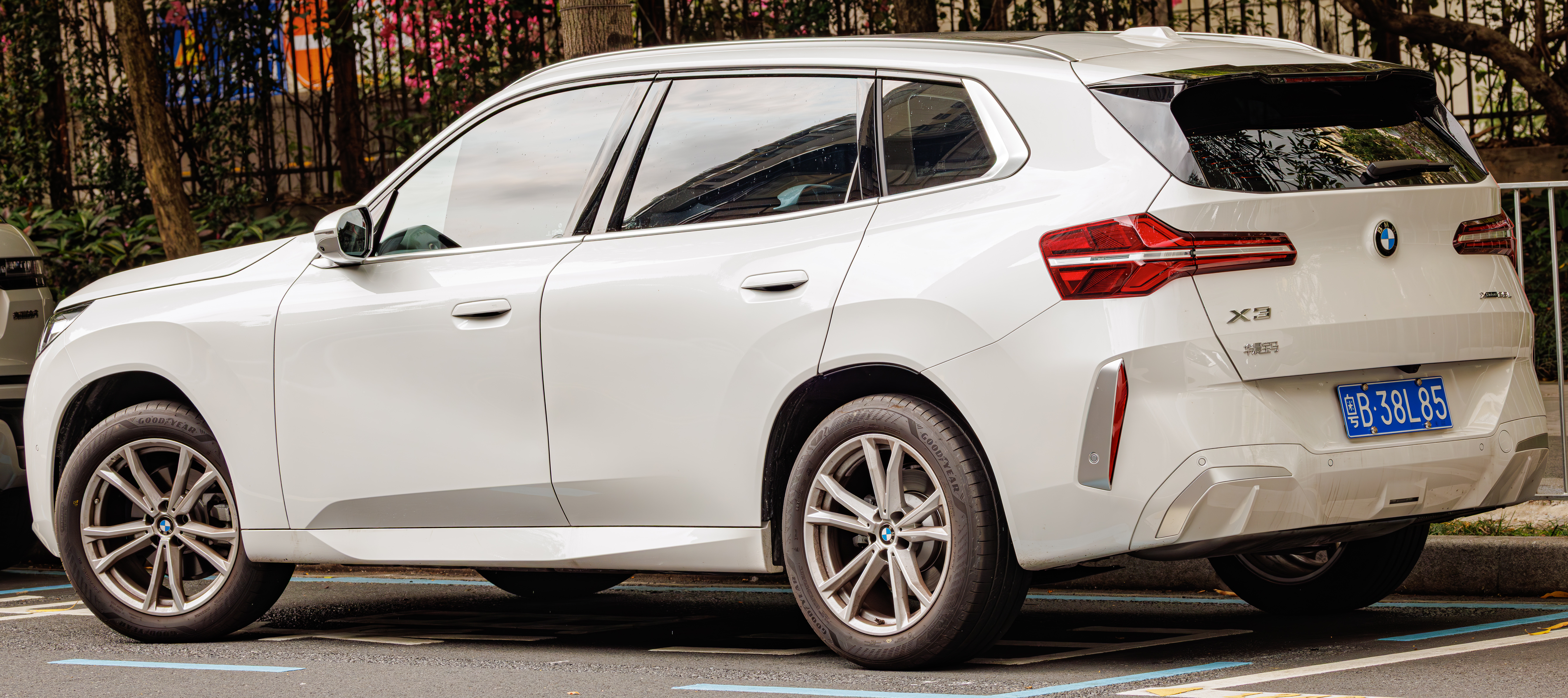
X3 xDrive25L Luxury Line rear view

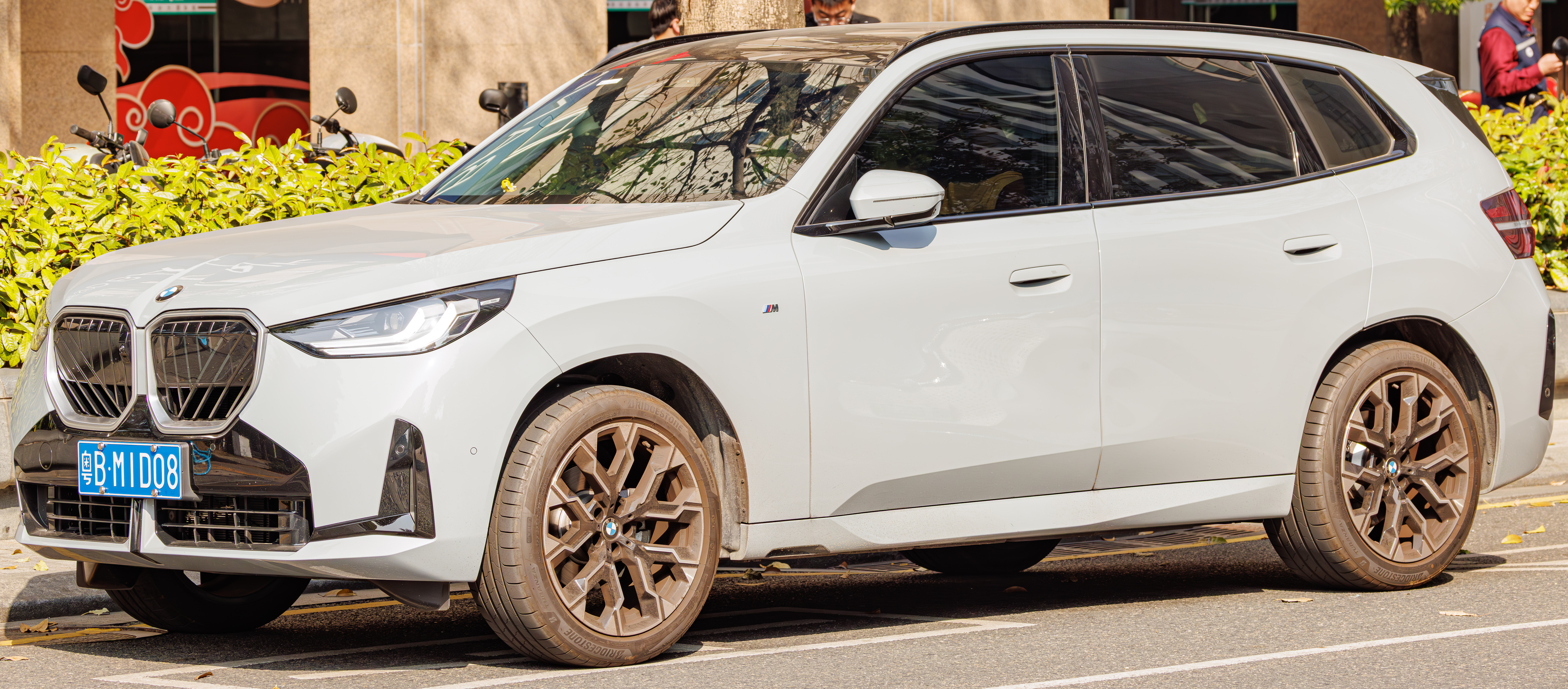
X3 xDrive30L M Sport

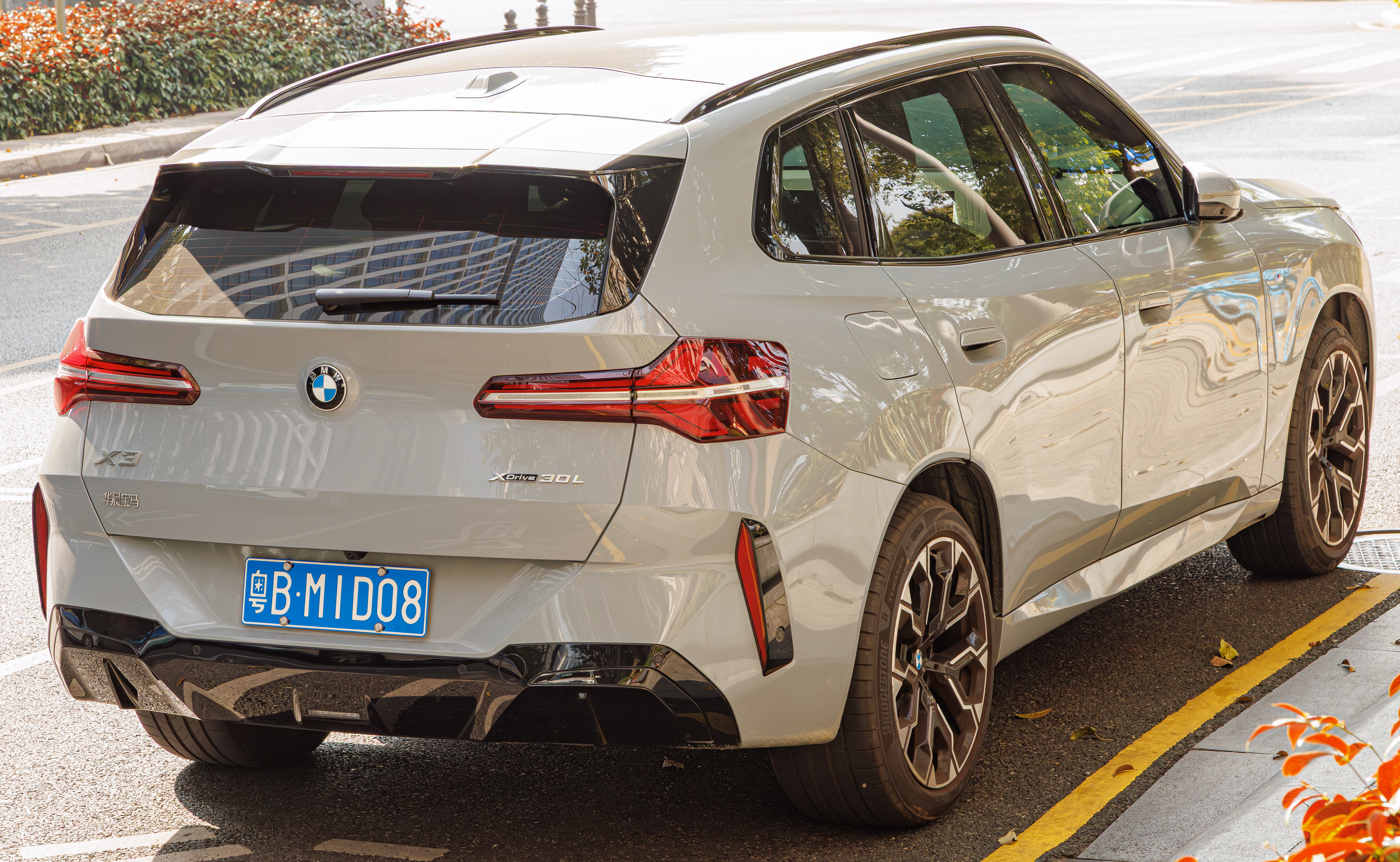
X3 xDrive30L M Sport rear view

== Powertrains ==
| Model | Fuel type | Engine code | Displacement | Power | Torque | Combined system output (hp; Nm) | Transmission | Electric motor | Battery | Top Speed | Acceleration 0–100km/h (0–62mph) | Layout |
|---|---|---|---|---|---|---|---|---|---|---|---|---|
| 20 xDrive | Petrol mild hybrid | B48 | 2.0 L (1,998 cc) I4 turbo | 187 hp (190 PS; 139 kW) @ 4,400-6,500 rpm Motor: 18 hp (18 PS; 13 kW) | 310 N⋅m (229 lb⋅ft) @ 1,500-4,000 rpm Motor: 200 N⋅m (148 lb⋅ft) | 205 hp (208 PS; 153 kW); 330 N⋅m (243 lb⋅ft) | 8-speed ZF 8HP automatic | 48 V power booster | 0.9 kWh lithium-ion | 215 km/h (134 mph) | 7.8 s | AWD |
| 30 xDrive | Petrol mild hybrid | B48 | 2.0 L (1,998 cc) I4 turbo | 251 hp (254 PS; 187 kW) @ 4,700-6,500 rpm Motor: 18 hp (18 PS; 13 kW) | 400 N⋅m (295 lb⋅ft) @ 1,600-4,500 rpm Motor: 200 N⋅m (148 lb⋅ft) | 251 hp (254 PS; 187 kW); 400 N⋅m (295 lb⋅ft) | 8-speed ZF 8HP automatic | 48 V power booster | 0.9 kWh lithium-ion | 210 km/h (130 mph) | 6.3 s | AWD |
| M50 xDrive* | Petrol mild hybrid | B58 | 3.0 L (2,998 cc) I6 turbo | 376 hp (381 PS; 280 kW) @ 5,200-6,250 rpm Motor: 18 hp (18 PS; 13 kW) | 540 N⋅m (398 lb⋅ft) @ 1,900-4,800 rpm Motor: 200 N⋅m (148 lb⋅ft) | 393 hp (398 PS; 293 kW); 580 N⋅m (428 lb⋅ft) | 8-speed ZF 8HP automatic | 48 V power booster | 0.9 kWh lithium-ion | 250 km/h (155 mph) | 4.6 s | AWD |
| 30e xDrive | Petrol plug-in hybrid | B48 | 2.0 L (1,998 cc) I4 turbo | 187 hp (190 PS; 139 kW) @ 4,400-6,500 rpm Motor: 181 hp (184 PS; 135 kW) | 310 N⋅m (229 lb⋅ft) @ 1,500-4,000 rpm Motor: 250 N⋅m (184 lb⋅ft) | 295 hp (299 PS; 220 kW); 450 N⋅m (332 lb⋅ft) | 8-speed ZF 8HP automatic | Synchronous electric motor | 19.7 kWh lithium-ion | 215 km/h (134 mph) | 6.2 s | AWD |
| 20d xDrive | Diesel mild hybrid | B47 | 2.0 L (1,995 cc) I4 turbo | 194 hp (197 PS; 145 kW) @ 4,000 rpm Motor: 11 hp (11 PS; 8 kW) | 400 N⋅m (295 lb⋅ft) @ 1,500-2,750 rpm Motor: 25 N⋅m (18 lb⋅ft) | 194 hp (197 PS; 145 kW); 400 N⋅m (295 lb⋅ft) | 8-speed ZF 8HP automatic | 48 V power booster | 0.9 kWh lithium-ion | 215 km/h (134 mph) | 7.7 s | AWD |
| 40d xDrive | Diesel mild hybrid | B57 | 3.0 L (2,993 cc) I6 turbo | 282 hp (286 PS; 210 kW) @ 4,000 rpm Motor: 18 hp (18 PS; 13 kW) | 650 N⋅m (479 lb⋅ft) @ 1,500-2,500 rpm Motor: 200 N⋅m (148 lb⋅ft) | 299 hp (303 PS; 223 kW); 670 N⋅m (494 lb⋅ft) | 8-speed ZF 8HP automatic | 48 V power booster | 0.9 kWh lithium-ion | 245 km/h (152 mph) | 5.4 s | AWD |

* = Not applicable for the European-specification.

== Awards ==
- 2025 South African Car of the Year
