= Narsha (EP) =

EP by Narsha
- Released: July 8, 2010
- Recorded: 2010
- Genre: K-pop; trip hop; electronic; dance-pop
- Length: 20:55
- Language: Korean
- Label: Nega Network
- Producer: Lee Min-soo

Singles from NARSHA
- 1. "I'm In Love" Released: July 2, 2010; 2. "Bbi Ri Bba Bba (삐리빠빠)" Released: July 8, 2010; 3. "Mamma Mia (맘마미아)" Released: August 20, 2010

Narsha (stylized as NARSHA) is the debut extended play by South Korean singer Narsha, a member from girl group Brown Eyed Girls. Lee Min-soo, her group's long-time producer served as the album's executive producer. Featuring a dark and edgy sound, it was released on July 8, 2010, and distributed by Nega Network. The EP features seven tracks in total, including one preview and one instrumental version of the album's title track.

Upon its release, the album became a success by debuting at number three on Gaon Weekly Albums Chart with an approximate sale of 5,000+. It also received positive reviews from music critics, praising its dark theme along with the electronic influence. Three singles were released from the album, with the first and pre-release single "I'm In Love", a remake of Ra.D's original song. The second and title track, titled "삐리빠빠 (Bbi Ri Bba Bba)", became another solo hit for Narsha as well as her signature solo song. "Mamma Mia" was released as the last digital single on August 20, 2010, one month after the album's release.

== Background and composition ==
In 2010, it was announced that all Brown Eyed Girls' members would start their own solo careers beside their group activities, starting first with Narsha. Its original title was "Narshism", but later changed to just plain "NARSHA". The album was produced executively by Lee Min-soo, while frequent lyricist Kim Eana participated in writing the majority of the album's lyrics. It also featured productions from producer DJ Jinu a.k.a. Hitchhiker, whom is responsible for her home group's most well-known hit "Abracadabra" and had previously remixed their single "How Come?". Musically, the album is a K-pop record with a "dark and edgy" electronic sound, while also including R&B and bossa nova elements.

== Singles ==
=== "I'm In Love" ===
Originally a Ra.D song, "I'm In Love" was selected as the album's first single, It was released on July 2, 2010, reaching number six on Gaon Singles Chart (Weekly) and number four on Gaon Download Chart (Weekly).

=== "Bbi Ri Bba Bba" ===
The song was announced as the album's title track upon its track list announcement. It peaked at number six on Gaon Singles Chart during the second week while reaching number three on the download chart. An accompanying music video was released online, receiving mixed to positive reacts due to its dark and gothic theme. Upon its release, the song became her most successful solo hit to date

=== "Mamma Mia" ===
Previously included as a 27-second preview on the album, the full version was released as the last digital single on August 20, 2010, featuring Sunny Hill. The song also peaked at number six and number four on Gaon Singles Chart and Gaon Download Chart, respectively. An accompanying music video was also released online, receiving an R-19 rating.

== Release and promotion ==
The album was originally intended to be released in May, 2010, but was pushed back to June, then July, 2010, due to schedule conflicts. Prior to the release of the album, two teasers for both "I'm In Love" and "Bbi Ri Bba Bba" were released online, along with photo teasers and behind-the-scene cuts from the latter song.

Narsha made her debut solo stage on Music Bank (KBS) on July 9, 2010, followed by performances on Music Core (MBC) and Inkigayo (SBS), performing the title track "Bbi Ri Bba Bba". She then went on to promote the album on many programs. The title track's promotion was wrapped up on July 30 and August 1 before starting with "Mamma Mia" from August 8, 2010, due to Brown Eyed Girls' showcase in Japan promoting their Japanese debut. She then performed "Bbi Ri Bba Bba" again for KBS's Gayo Daejun on December 31, 2010.

== Track listing ==
CD/Digital download
No.	Title	Lyrics	Music	Length
1.	"Fantastic"	Kim Eana	Hitchhiker (DJ Jinu)	3:22
2.	"Bbi Ri Bba Bba" (삐리빠빠)	Kim Eana	Kim Yang-woo	3:27
3.	"I'm In Love" (with Sungha Jung)	Ra.D	Sungha Jung, Shinji Ho	4:02
4.	"Queen B"	Lee Da-in	Kim Jee-eun	3:32
5.	"Radio Star"	Kim Eana	Lee Min-soo	3:53
6.	"Mamma Mia (Preview)"	Kim Eana	Lee Min-soo	0:27
7.	"Bbi Ri Bba Bba (Instrumental)"	Kim Eana	Kim Yang-woo	3:27
Total length:				22:10

Digital download only
No.	Title	Lyrics	Music	Length
1.	"Mamma Mia" (맘마미아, with Sunny Hill)	Kim Eana	Lee Min-soo	3:20
2.	"Bbi Ri Bba Bba" (삐리빠빠 (East4A Club Vocal Mix))	Kim Eana	King Yang-woo, east4a	3:38
Total length:				4:24

== Chart performance ==
=== Album charts ===
Country	Chart	Peak chart positions	Sales
South Korea	Gaon Weekly Albums Chart	3	KOR: 5,000+
South Korea	Gaon Monthly Albums Chart	11	KOR: 5,000+
South Korea	Gaon Year-End Albums Chart	—	KOR: 5,000+

== Awards and nominations ==
=== Annual music awards ===
Year	Award	Category	Recipient	Result
2010	12th Mnet Asian Music Awards	Best Solo Dance Performance	"Bbi Ri Bba Bba"	Nominated

== Release history ==
Country	Date	Format	Label
South Korea	July 8, 2010	CD+DVD, digital download	Nega Network
Worldwide	July 8, 2010	Digital download	Nega Network
