= Adaptation (disambiguation) =

Adaptation, in biology, is the process or trait by which organisms or population better match their environment

Adaptation may also refer to:

== Arts ==
- Adaptation (arts), a transfer of a work of art from one medium to another
  - Film adaptation, a story from another work, adapted into a film
  - Literary adaptation, a story from a literary source, adapted into another work
  - Novelization, the adaptation of another work into a novel
  - Theatrical adaptation, a story from another work, adapted into a play
- Adaptation (film), a 2002 film by Spike Jonze
- "Adaptation" (The Walking Dead), a television episode
- Adaptation, a 2012 novel by Malinda Lo
- "Adaptation", a song by the Weekend from his 2013 album Kiss Land

== Biology and medicine ==
- Adaptation (eye), the eye's adjustment to light
  - Chromatic adaptation, visual systems' adjustments to changes in illumination for preservation of colors
  - Prism adaptation, sensory-motor adjustments after the visual field has been artificially shifted
- Cellular adaptation, changes by cells/tissues in response to changed microenvironments
- High-altitude adaptation, organisms and their specializations for life in high altitudes
- Neural adaptation, the responsiveness of a sensory system to a constant stimulus
- The SAID principle, a sports training concept, standing for "Specific Adaptation to Imposed Demands"

== Communication technology ==
- ATM adaptation layer, information transfer protocols that support Asynchronous Transfer Mode
- Content adaptation, transforming content to adapt to device capabilities, particularly in mobile devices
- Link adaptation, Adaptive coding and modulation in wireless communication

== Control and information theory ==
- Adaptation (computer science) by which interactive systems adapt to individual users and environments
- Adapted process, a stochastic process with a matching filtration
- Adaptive system, a set of interacting entities that enable the whole to improve its response
- Complex adaptive system, rich interactions between elements that result in feedback and adaptation
- Domain adaptation, a field associated with machine learning and transfer learning

== Human sciences ==
- Behavioral adaptation, an adjustment to another type of behavior or environmental context
- Hedonic adaptation, the ability of preserving at a stable level of happiness despite better or worse changes in the personal material life
- Psychological adaptation, a mind and body interaction which results from competitive or cooperation types of evolution
- Preconditioning (adaptation), a general concept in which an entity is exposed to some type of stress or reinforcement stimulus, in order to become more resilient when and if that external factor would happen anytime in the future

== Other uses ==
- Climate change adaptation
- Ecosystem-based adaptation
