= Trace Bundy =

American acoustic guitarist

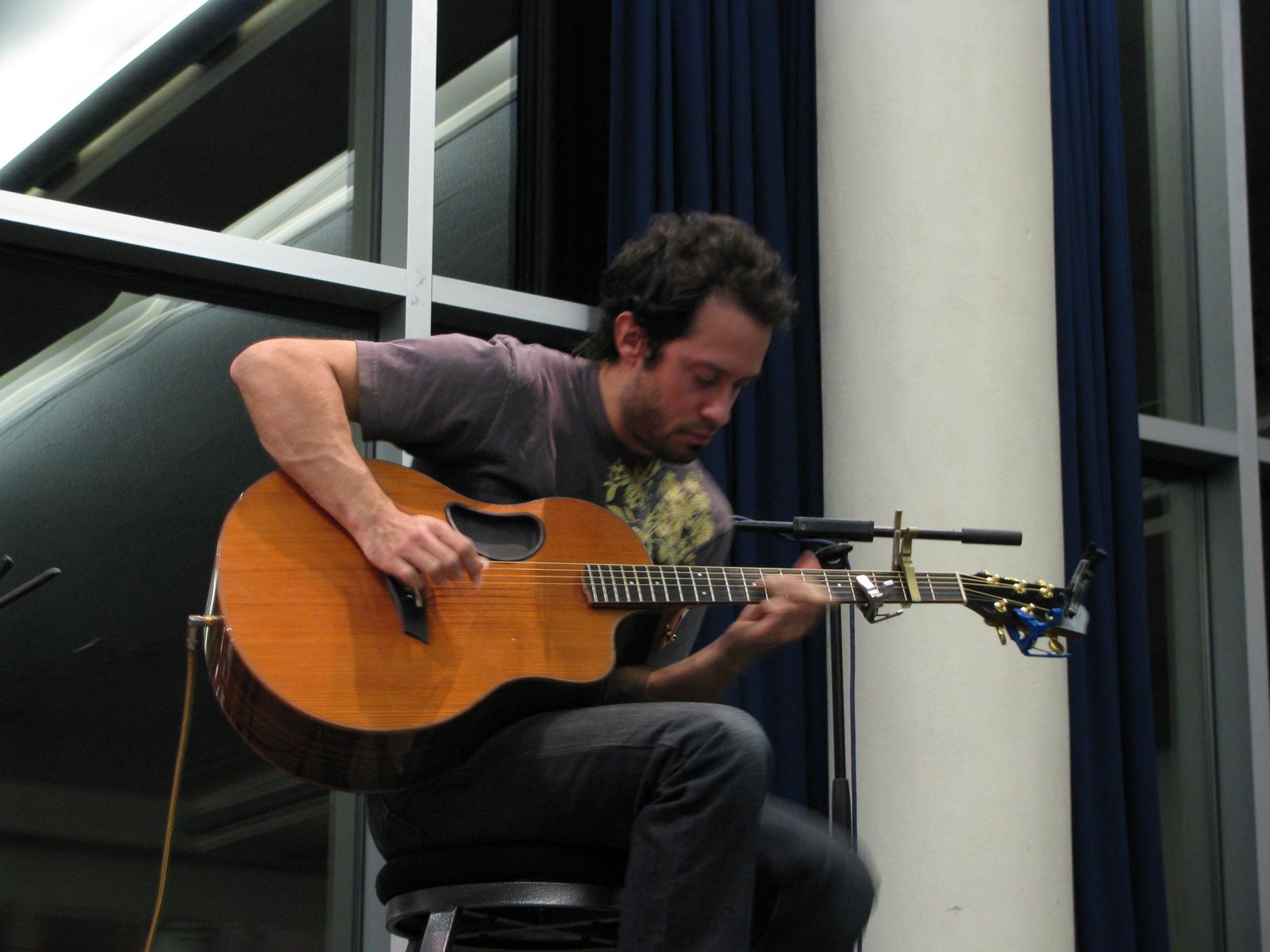
- Bundy performing with multiple capos

Background information
- Birth name: Trace Bundy
- Born: January 20, 1977 (age 48); Austin, Minnesota
- Genres: Acoustic; fingerstyle guitar; progressive-acoustic-folk
- Occupation(s): Guitarist, Songwriter
- Instruments: Guitar
- Years active: 1999–present
- Labels: United Interests
- Spouse: Rebecca (Becca)
- Website: www.tracebundy.com

Trace Bundy is an American acoustic guitar player who lives and performs in Boulder, Colorado. He is known to fans as "The Acoustic Ninja" for his legato and finger tapping skills. Bundy's guitar playing style is percussive and harmonic: he plays with both hands on the fretboard, intricate finger picking arpeggios and inventive use of multiple capos. He was showcased and eventually discovered on websites such as YouTube and Facebook.

== Early life and development of playing style ==
Bundy was born in Austin, Minnesota and later moved to the small town of Buena Vista, Colorado. As a boy Bundy and his brother bought a guitar together, and Bundy began learning songs from guitar magazines.

Bundy is right-handed. During his teenage years he began experimenting with his playing style. He gave up using a guitar pick, and instead grew his fingernails long to develop his fingerpicking style. He also introduced a harmonic slapping technique, the use of various effects pedals, and capos.

Bundy met Jonah Werner (now an acclaimed acoustic folk songwriter) in high school and started playing with him at a local coffee shop in Buena Vista. The duo played mostly Jackopierce and other various folk songs. Bundy then met Tim Thornton from Newcomers Home and started playing old Dylan and Cat Stevens tunes. They all attended the University of Colorado at Boulder and still continue to play together from time to time.

Bundy moved to Boulder, Colorado and attended the University of Colorado where he earned his undergraduate and master's degrees in civil engineering, and then taught at the university for a further two years. During this period his concert bookings increased steadily, and eventually he decided to become a full-time musician.

== Career ==
Bundy's first musical release was in 1999 with O Night Divine, a collection of traditional Christmas songs. His next recording, containing all original songs, was 2000's Solomon's Splendor.

In October 2004, he released a CD/DVD titled Adapt. The DVD is of a live concert filmed in Boulder in the summer of 2004.

Many clips from this DVD have circulated on YouTube and have received well over twenty-one million views. Some of the more popular clips are Bundy covering the Backstreet Boys song "I Want It That Way", and Pachelbel's Canon performed on an acoustic guitar using the fingertapping technique. Bundy acquired the nickname "Acoustic Ninja" after a review of one of his shows in a Colorado newspaper was titled "Attack of the Acoustic Ninja".

Following this album was A Few Songs for Christmas, an EP of more Christmas songs released in December 2007. In 2008, Bundy released Missile Bell, a two-part project consisting of a studio CD, a live CD, and a DVD filmed live at the Boulder Theater in November 2007. The album was inspired by a trip Bundy and his wife Becca made to Central America, accompanying a humanitarian group. At the end of 2008, Bundy was named "Most Promising New Talent of the Year" by Acoustic Guitar magazine, and came in third in the same magazine's "Best Fingerstyle Guitarist of the Year" category.

In 2005, Bundy discovered a finger-picking guitar prodigy when he saw a YouTube video of a nine-year-old Korean boy Sungha Jung playing Bundy's version of Pachelbel's Canon. Bundy twice toured South Korea and he would get in touch with Jung and have him open Bundy's shows. Then Bundy would call Jung up on the stage with him to play Cannon in unison. In 2009 Bundy flew Jung to the United States and the two did a U.S. West Coast tour. Since that time the two have played together often.

Bundy released Elephant King on May 1, 2012.

In 2014, Bundy won the ESPN SportsCenter Fan Jam contest while he performed the program's theme tune live on the show on March 4, 2014 at ESPN's studios in Bristol, Connecticut.”

In 2016, he was the subject of Acoustic Ninja, a short documentary film made by Florida State University student Robert Bevis. It was included in the official selection of six film festivals, and was a finalist at the Emerging Filmmaker Showcase at the Cannes Film Festival in 2017.

=== Reviews ===
Possessing a staggering acoustic technique, on both right and left sides, Bundy has made his reputation as a next generation solo guitarist of serious repute. Furious, marksman-like fretboard tapping, blizzards of bouncing harmonics, tricky in-song capo-sliding (or removal/addition), freehand guitar body tapping — Bundy combines a dizzying range of offbeat technical calisthenics and inverted melodic sense to create what can safely be characterized as performance art.

— Dave Kirby of the Boulder Weekly.

== Personal life ==
Trace Bundy married Rebecca on September 3, 2002. Together, they have two sons.

== Discography ==
Releases on the Honest Ninja Music label:

- O Night Divine (1999)
- Solomon's Splendor (2000)
- Adapt (2004)
- A Few Songs for Christmas EP (2007)
- Missile Bell (2008)
- Elephant King (2012)
