= Sungha Jung =

South Korean guitarist (born 1996)

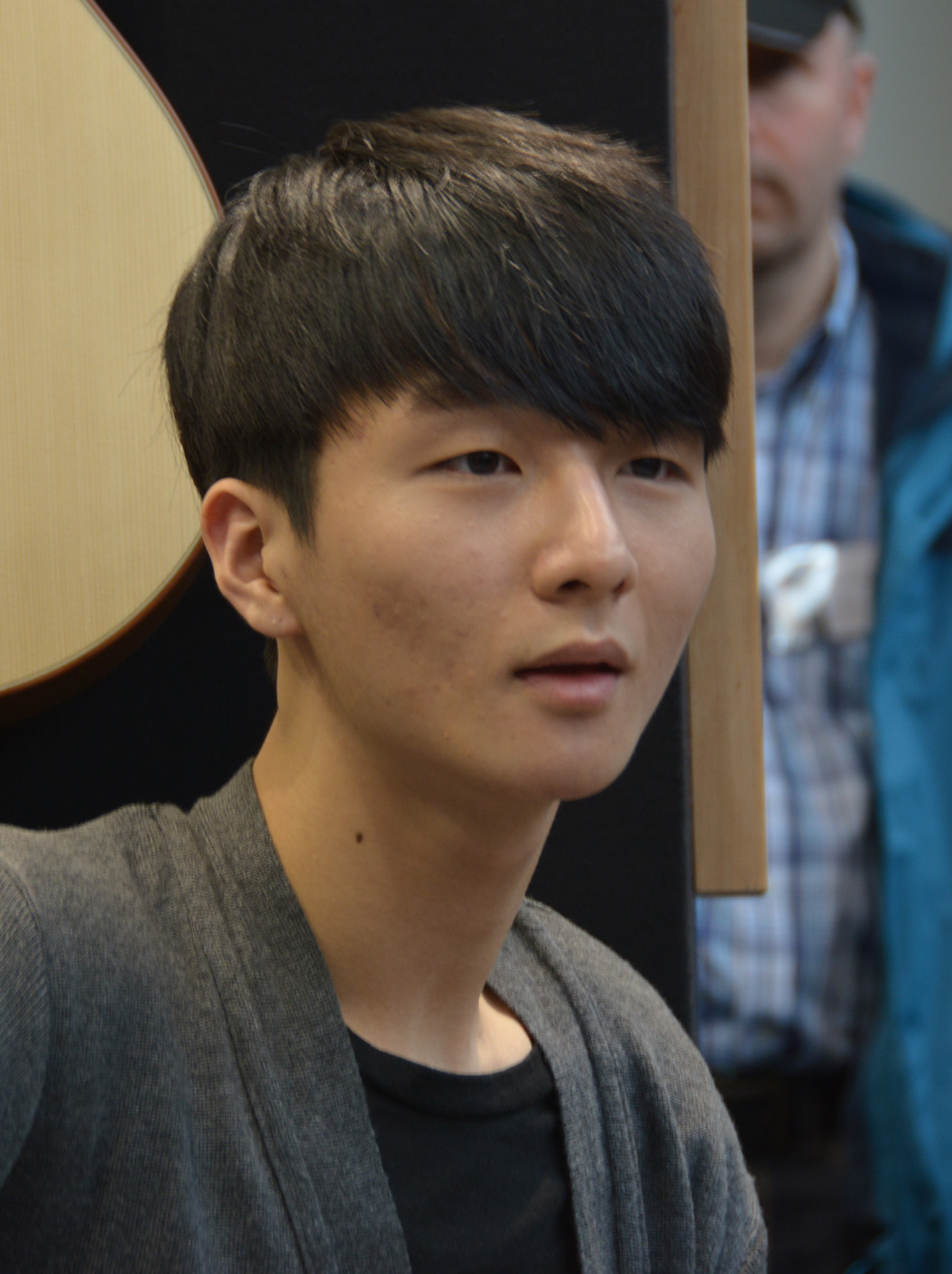
- Jung in April 2016

Background information
- Born: Jung Sung-ha; 2 September 1996 (age 30); Cheongju, North Chungcheong, South Korea
- Occupation: Musician
- Instruments: Guitar; ukulele; piano; vocals
- Years active: 2006–present
- Website: sunghajung.com

Korean name
- Hangul: 정성하
- Hanja: 鄭晟河
- RR: Jeong Seongha
- MR: Chŏng Sŏngha

Sungha Jung (Korean: 정성하; born 2 September 1996) is a South Korean musician who specializes in acoustic fingerstyle guitar. Jung creates acoustic covers and arrangements, typically by ear and/or by watching videos, and composes original songs, both of which he plays and uploads online. He is often described as a guitar prodigy, though he prefers to be known as a "guitarist" rather than a "prodigy." His YouTube channel currently has more than 7 million subscribers.

== Biography ==
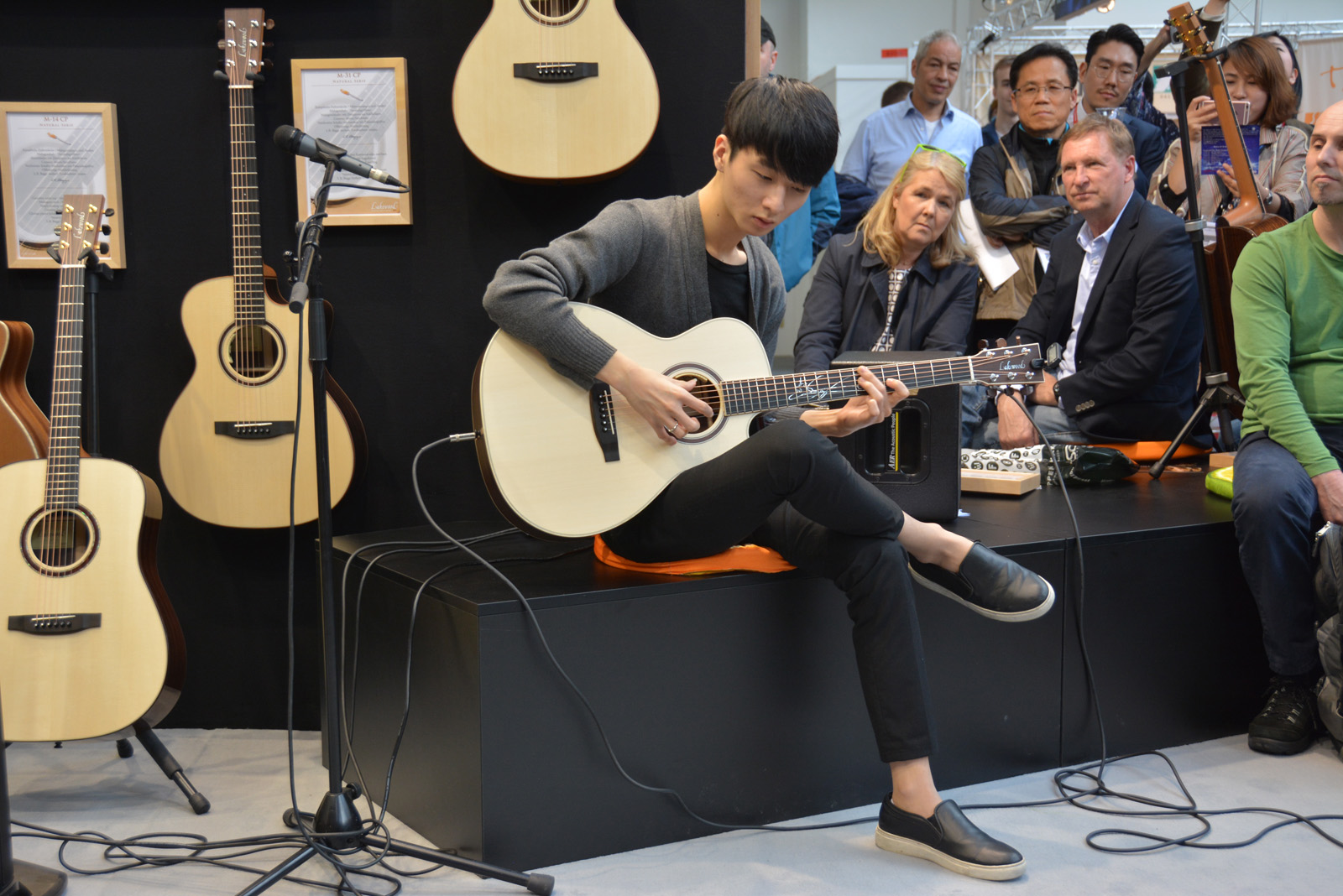
Sungha Jung at the Musikmesse Frankfurt 2016

Jung developed an interest in guitar after watching his father play. He found his father's guitar playing more interesting than piano, which he was already learning. Jung's father taught him the basics, and after learning the basics, he developed his skill greatly just by trying to play what he heard. When he struggled, he would study online videos. Jung came to play fingerstyle when his father discovered the technique on the internet. His first "idol" was guitarist Kotaro Oshio, from whom he developed an interest in fingerstyle guitar. At first, Jung's mother and grandmother disapproved of the "noise" that Jung and his father continuously created, but they came to understand it as his gift.

Trace Bundy found a video of 9-year-old Sungha Jung playing Bundy's version of (Pachelbel's) Canon. After Bundy saw his cover, Jung played with Bundy in tours throughout South Korea and the United States. Soon after his debut video on the internet, he garnered many supporters, from whom he asked for advice on his playing. His cover of "The Pirates of the Caribbean" theme song, which has over 66 million views on YouTube as of November 2025, made Jung an internet sensation. Jung has since played on stage with them multiple times. Jung has received guitar lessons from Hata Shuji, a well-known Japanese jazz guitarist. He has also been mentored by German guitarist Ulli Bögershausen, who Jung has referred to as his musical inspiration, and from whom he learned much about composing and arranging.

In a video, he recommended the "AllEars method" for those who like his style of guitar playing and want to learn it. In addition to steel-string and classical guitar, he has been recorded playing twelve-string guitar, electric guitar, ukulele, guitarlele, harp ukulele, and piano. He has also sung live, such as when he sang "Falling Slowly" at a concert in Bangkok. Apart from Korean, Jung speaks English, which he studied to be able to communicate during concerts abroad.

=== Guitars ===
Jung received his first guitar at age nine, a very coarse plywood guitar that cost less than $60. Upon discovering Jung's skill with the toy-like guitar, his father decided to buy him a better one – a Cort Earth900. Jung began seriously playing with this guitar. His third guitar was a custom-made small-combo sized "All Spruce" Selma model, upon which Thomas Leeb wrote "KEEP ON GROOVING! TO MY FRIEND, THOMAS LEEB" In 2009, with the help of Ulli Bögershausen, he established sponsorship from Lakewood Guitars and currently plays Lakewood Signature Model instruments. Jung mostly plays baritone guitars with a longer neck, thicker strings and deeper tuning than normal guitars.

=== Practice and recording ===
Jung's daily practice time as a child was one to two hours long when there was school, and up to three hours during school breaks. Jung usually takes seconds to figure out the notes and fingering to a piece, and typically takes a few hours to practice before covering a piece. However, to make his songs better and more accurate, he occasionally spent from a couple of days up to a month practicing.

=== Performances ===
In 2010, Jung was featured on Narsha's solo album NARSHA, for the song "I'm in Love". In 2011 he performed in the US with Trace Bundy, and also toured Scandinavia and Japan. In 2012 he collaborated with 2NE1, creating acoustic versions of the group's hit songs "Lonely" and "I Love You". Later in 2012, he participated in a live stage with BIGBANG's G-Dragon, where they performed "That XX". He performed "I'm Yours" with Jason Mraz, who described Jung as "amazing" and his "hero", in 2013. Jung played Ahn Hyeok in the 2011 Korean movie, The Suicide Forecast.

== Albums ==
Jung released his first album, Perfect Blue, on 17 June 2010, his second album, Irony, on 21 September 2011, and his third solo album Paint It Acoustic on 15 April 2013. These three were recorded at Ulli Bögershausen's studio in Germany, each featuring increasingly more original compositions. Jung also recorded an album consisting of guitar duets called The Duets, released on 17 December 2012.

Jung's fourth solo album, Monologue, almost exclusively composed of his own original pieces, was released on 28 April 2014. This album was recorded at Brickwall Sound in Seoul and produced by Jung himself. Jung's fifth solo album, Two of Me, was released on 1 May 2015 and consists entirely of original compositions. L'Atelier, his sixth solo album, was released on 13 May 2016 and has nine original pieces, as well as one original arrangement.

Jung released Mixtape on 12 May 2017, describing it as a 'mixtape' of various genres that have had a large influence on him over the last few years.

=== Discography ===
- Perfect Blue (2010)
- Irony (2011)
- The Duets (2012)
- Paint It Acoustic (2013)
- Monologue (2014)
- Two of Me (2015)
- L'Atelier (2016)
- Mixtape (2017)
- Andante (2018)
- Sungha Jung Cover Compilation 1 (2019)
- Sungha Jung Cover Compilation 2 (2019)
- Sungha Jung Cover Compilation 3 (2019)
- Sungha Jung Cover Compilation 4 (2019)
- Sungha Jung Cover Compilation 5 (2019)
- Sungha Jung Cover Compilation 6 (2021)
- Sungha Jung Cover Compilation 7 (2021)
- Sungha Jung Cover Compilation 8 (2021)
- Sungha Jung Cover Compilation 9 (2021)
- Poetry (2022)
