= Solomon's Splendor =

Studio album by Trace Bundy
- Released: January 2000
- Genre: Modern folk, instrumental rock
- Length: 38:16
- Label: Honest Ninja

Trace Bundy chronology
O Night Divine (1999)	Solomon's Splendor (2000)	Adapt (2004)

Solomon's Splendor is a 2000 album by Trace Bundy. It comprises original instrumental music on acoustic guitar. This album was re-released in February 2003.

== Track listing ==
All tracks are written by Trace Bundy.

Solomon's Splendor
No.	Title	Length
1.	"Blazing Son"	3:45
2.	"Moonstones and Chromosomes"	2:27
3.	"Acoustic Ninja"	3:44
4.	"Solomon's Splendor"	3:12
5.	"Spamtown USA"	3:48
6.	"Winter Wheat"	3:10
7.	"Ead's Alpine Experience"	3:12
8.	"The Simple Ways"	3:45
9.	"Majmin"	2:21
10.	"Alabaster"	3:18
11.	"Jugo de Naranja"	2:56
12.	"Lullaby on Three"	2:42
