= Elephant King =

Studio album by Trace Bundy
- Released: 2012
- Recorded: December 10, 2011
- Studio: Boulder Theater - Saint Ida's Recording Studio
- Genre: Modern folk, instrumental rock
- Length: 43:40
- Label: Honest Ninja Music

Trace Bundy chronology
| Missile Bell (2008) | Elephant King (2012) |

Elephant King is a 2012 album by Trace Bundy. This two-disc set includes a full-length studio CD and a full-feature live DVD.

== Critical reception ==
Dave Kirby of the Boulder Weekly said: "What becomes obvious is that, for a guy who has mastered the fiendish intricacies of multi-voiced fingerstyle guitar, the center of the universe is still melody."

Kelly Tasker of Grateful Web reviewed the album and had this to say: "This is Bundy's most diverse and complex effort to date, and he accomplishes it all with finesse and a playful spirit that shines through on every track."

== Track listing ==
All tracks are written by Trace Bundy Joseph Brenna & Rob Gordon.

Elephant King Disc 1
| No. | Title | Length |
|---|---|---|
| 1. | "Elephant King" | 4:35 |
| 2. | "Joy & Sorrow" | 5:02 |
| 3. | "Traverse" | 4:59 |
| 4. | "Tres Capos" | 4:43 |
| 5. | "Timepiece" | 3:49 |
| 6. | "Adventures in Sawyerland" | 1:55 |
| 7. | "Be Still" | 3:38 |
| 8. | "Overtime" | 4:39 |
| 9. | "Bongolo" | 4:52 |
| 10. | "Coronation" | 3:37 |
| 11. | "Anchor" | 1:51 |

Elephant King (DVD)
| No. | Title | Length |
|---|---|---|
| 1. | "Elephant King" | 0 |
| 2. | "Bongolo" | 0 |
| 3. | "Traverse" | 0 |
| 4. | "Tiny Lolf's Journey" | 0 |
| 5. | "Overtime" | 0 |
| 6. | "Joy and Sorrow" | 0 |
| 7. | "Hot Capo Stew" | 0 |
| 8. | "Duelling Ninjas" | 0 |
| 9. | "Becca and the Blue Capo" | 0 |

== Personnel ==
- Trace Bundy - guitars - tracks 1–11
- Aubrea Alford - violin - tracks 3 and 11
- Brian McRae - percussion - tracks 3, 5, 9
- Dave Wilton - synthesizer [Moog on an iPhone], and electric guitar, piano and glockenspiel - tracks 4, 6, 10, 11
- Latifah Phillips - cello - track 6
- Renee Swick - clarinet - track 6
