= O Night Divine (album) =

Studio album by Trace Bundy
- Released: December 1999
- Genre: Modern folk, instrumental rock
- Length: 32:40
- Label: Honest Ninja Music

Trace Bundy chronology
O Night Divine (1999)	Solomon's Splendor (2000)

O Night Divine is a 1999 album by Trace Bundy. It comprises raw acoustic instrumental arrangements of Christmas songs. The album was re-released in September 2003.

== Track listing ==
All tracks are written by Trace Bundy.

O Night Divine
No.	Title	Length
1.	"What Child Is This"	3:31
2.	"Silent Night"	2:39
3.	"A Mighty Fortress"	3:25
4.	"Away in a Manger"	4:19
5.	"O Holy Night"	4:25
6.	"Jesu, Joy of Man's Desiring"	3:25
7.	"O Little Town of Bethlehem"	3:46
8.	"We Three Kings"	2:49
9.	"Ode to Joy"	4:21
