= Adapt (Trace Bundy album) =

Studio album by Trace Bundy
- Released: October 2004
- Recorded: DVD Live
- Venue: Flatirons Theater
- Genres: Contemporary modern folk, instrumental rock
- Length: 56:00
- Label: Honest Ninja

Trace Bundy chronology
Solomon's Splendor (2000)	Adapt (2004)	Missile Bell (2008)

Adapt is a 2004 studio album by Trace Bundy. This two-disc set includes a full-length studio CD and a full-feature live DVD; recorded live at Flatirons Theater, June 30, 2004.

== Track listing ==
All tracks are written by Trace Bundy Joseph Brenna & Rob Gordon.

Adapt CD
No.	Title	Length
1.	"Bristlecone"	5:33
2.	"Dueling Ninjas"	4:24
3.	"Porch"	2:37
4.	"Adapt"	6:01
5.	"Stone's Serenade"	4:27
6.	"Patanga"	5:27
7.	"Acoustic Ninja"	4:48
8.	"Cloud Forest"	3:22
9.	"Canon"	4:06
10.	"Trespass"	6:56
11.	"Ditty"	2:35
12.	"Moon Rise"	5:38

Adapt DVD
No.	Title	Length
1.	"Dueling Ninjas"
2.	"Bristlecone"
3.	"Canon"
4.	"Urban Challenge"
5.	"Trespass"
6.	"Adapt"
7.	"Patanga"
8.	"Hot Capo Stew"
