= Preconditioning (adaptation) =

Preconditioning occurs when an animal is exposed to a stressor or stimulus in order to prepare it for a later encounter with a similar stressor or stimulus.

For example, in vaccinations, a human is exposed to an artificially weakened virus in order to stimulate the body's immune system to produce antibodies that fight the virus. Then, when the live virus is encountered, the body can vigorously defend against it, already having produced the relevant antibodies. See pre-exposure prophylaxis.
