= Mr. Superlove =

Studio album by Ass Ponys
- Released: 1990
- Genres: Country rock, indie rock
- Length: 55:37
- Labels: OKra, Anyway
- Producer: John Curley

Ass Ponys chronology
Mr. Superlove (1990)	Grim (1993)

Mr. Superlove is the debut studio album by Cincinnati, Ohio-based indie rock band Ass Ponys. It was originally released in 1990 on OKra Records, and was subsequently reissued by Anyway Records with several bonus tracks. John Curley produced and recorded the album at his home studio. Upon its initial release, the album became a commercial flop due to distribution problems. In 2006, select remastered songs from the album and its follow-up, Grim, along with various new outtakes, covers, and live versions, were released by Shake It Records on the album The Okra Years.

== Covers of title track ==
A cover of the album's title track appears on What Jail is Like EP, a 1993 EP by the Afghan Whigs. The Whigs' cover of the track also appears on a 7" single released soon after Mr. Superlove, which also featured a cover of the Whigs' song "You, My Flower" by the Ass Ponys, and on the 2014 reissue of the Whigs's 1993 album Gentlemen.

== Reception ==
Professional ratings
Review scores
Source	Rating
AllMusic	2/5 stars
Christgau's Consumer Guide	(2-star Honorable Mention)

Mr. Superlove was reviewed by Jason Cohen in the indie music magazine Option. Vickie Gilmer of Trouser Press wrote of the album: "The frontman's slightly nasal, oddly high-pitched vocal tricks most definitely aren't for everyone, but his hell-bent strains give the Ass Ponys an instantly likable quality." In 2001, the Dayton Daily News described the album as a "regional classic".

== Track listing ==
Side A

1. Hey Swifty – 5:34
2. Ford Madox Ford – 4:03
3. Eleven: Eleven – 4:55
4. (We All Love) Peanut Butter – 3:45
5. Laughing at the Ghosts – 5:33

Side B

1. Mr. Superlove – 4:56
2. Thank You for the Roses – 3:44
3. Ride Ramona – 3:58
4. Fingers Fall – 5:04
5. Bible House – 3:50

== Personnel ==
Ass Ponys

- Randy Cheek – bass, vocals
- Chuck Cleaver – vocals, guitar
- John Erhardt – guitar
- Dan Kleinger – drums

Other personnel

- John Curley – production, mixing, engineering
