= Attica! =

Studio album by Wussy
- Released: May 5, 2014
- Studios: Ultrasuede Studios (Cincinnati, Ohio)
- Genres: Indie rock, pop rock
- Labels: Damnably, Shake It

Wussy chronology
Strawberry (2011)	Attica! (2014)	Forever Sounds (2016)

Attica! is the fifth studio album by American indie rock band Wussy. It was released on May 5, 2014 on Damnably in the United Kingdom, making it their first studio album to be released there, and the following day on Shake It Records in the United States.

== Background and recording ==
The 11 songs on Attica! were recorded at Ultrasuede Studios in Cincinnati, which is owned by former Afghan Whigs bassist John Curley. The album also saw the return of a member of one of Wussy frontman Chuck Cleaver's former bands; Ass Ponys guitarist John Erhardt performed on Attica! as Wussy's fifth member.

== Influences ==
Attica!'s opening track, "Teenage Wasteland", describes singer Lisa Walker's memories of listening to the Who, especially the song "Baba O'Riley", and includes shoutouts to several of its members. The song also contains a guitar part that closely resembles that on "Baba O'Riley". The album's title track also references Dog Day Afternoon, portraying it as a tale of romantic desperation.

== Critical reception ==
Professional ratings
Review scores
Source	Rating
AllMusic	4/5 stars
Cuepoint (Expert Witness)	A+
Pitchfork	7.8/10
PopMatters	7/10
The Skinny	4/5 stars
Spin	8/10

Attica! received generally favorable reviews from critics, with Pitchfork's Joel Oliphint writing that "At Wussy’s best—and Attica! is pretty close to that—they’re capable of doing for us what Pete and Roger and Keith and John [referring to the members of the Who] did for them." Robert Christgau wrote in Cincinnati magazine, "In America—and Wussy are very American—only Arcade Fire and Vampire Weekend show as much will and ability to make every album both different and superb." He also said that "[Wussy's other lead singer, Lisa Walker's] ability to project empathy and dispassion simultaneously is an ongoing wonder." Another favorable review came from Charles Taylor, who wrote in the Los Angeles Review of Books that its music "...owes a debt to country-infused rock, to punk, to the sonic space and breadth Neil Young creates in his work with Crazy Horse, and, increasingly, to what might be called the erotics of noise — fuzztones, distortion, feedback."

=== Accolades ===
In June 2014, Attica! was placed at number 25 on Newsday's list of the "best albums of 2014 so far", as well as at number 48 on a similar list by Spin. Robert Christgau named it the best album of the year in his list for The Barnes & Noble Review.

== Track listing ==
1. Teenage Wasteland (Lisa Walker; Wussy)
2. Rainbows and Butterflies (Chuck Cleaver; Wussy)
3. Bug (Lisa Walker, Chuck Cleaver; Wussy)
4. North Sea Girls (Wussy)
5. Acetylene (Chuck Cleaver; Wussy)
6. To the Lightning (Chuck Cleaver, Lisa Walker; Wussy)
7. Halloween (Lisa Walker; Wussy)
8. Gene, I Dream (Chuck Cleaver; Wussy)
9. Attica! (Lisa Walker; Wussy)
10. Home (Chuck Cleaver; Wussy)
11. Beautiful (Chuck Cleaver; Wussy)
