= Grim (Ass Ponys album) =

Studio album by Ass Ponys
- Released: 1992 (OKra); 1993 (Safe House)
- Studio: Ultrasuede Studio, Cincinnati, OH
- Genre: Indie rock Country rock
- Length: 65:42
- Label: OKra; Safe House

Ass Ponys chronology
Mr. Superlove (1990)	Grim (1992)	Electric Rock Music (1994)

Grim is the second studio album by Cincinnati, Ohio-based indie rock band Ass Ponys. It was originally released in 1992 on OKra Records, and was re-released by Safe House Records in 1993.

== Critical reception ==
Professional ratings
Review scores
Source	Rating
AllMusic	3/5 stars
Chicago Tribune	3/4 stars
Christgau's Consumer Guide	(2-star Honorable Mention)
The Daily Vault	A
Spin	1/1 star

Grim received mixed reviews from critics. Greg Adams of AllMusic gave the album 3 out of 5 stars, writing that "Grim, when it hits its mark, is strong stuff." He added that on the album, "[Ass Ponys singer/songwriter Chuck] Cleaver takes twisted backwoods tales and freak-show tragedies and infuses them with just enough wistful reflection to turn Deliverance-style black humor into sometimes crushingly affecting narratives." In a 3-star (out of 4) review, Greg Kot wrote that the album's "...harmony vocals are plaintive and, on tunes such as "It's Not Happening," just about the prettiest thing you'll hear on a pop record this year."

In 2006, PopMatters' John Kenyon criticized the album for what he said was its "muddy production that made finding the hooks in some of the band’s songs an expedition of sorts". Trouser Press was also critical of the album's production, writing that "Maybe it's the occasionally muffled production that takes the fun down a peg, but Grim takes the "more serious" mission too seriously."

== Track listing ==
1. Big Rock Ending – 0:24
2. Azalea – 4:13
3. It's Not Happening – 4:32
4. No Dope No Cigarettes – 4:45
5. Ballpeen – 5:58
6. Not Since Superman Died – 2:39
7. I Love Bob – 2:57
8. Stupid – 4:38
9. Dirty Backseat Car Thing – 4:02
10. High Heaven – 4:19
11. Julia Pastrana – 3:31
12. Disappointed – 3:31
13. Her Father Was A Sailor – 5:33
14. The Big E – 4:07
15. Good With Guns – 5:11
16. California Bingo – 5:17

== Personnel ==
Ass Ponys

- Randy Cheek – bass, guitar, vocals
- Chuck Cleaver – guitar, vocals
- John Erhardt – bass, guitar, pedal steel, vocals
- Dave Morrison – drums, percussion

Other

- Niki Buehrig – backing vocals
- John Curley – engineer, mixing
- Jimmy Davidson – producer
- Dan Kleingers – drums, percussion, backing vocals
- Zy Orange Lyn – fiddle
- Gary Shell – engineer, mixing, producer
