= Earwig (band) =

American indie rock band

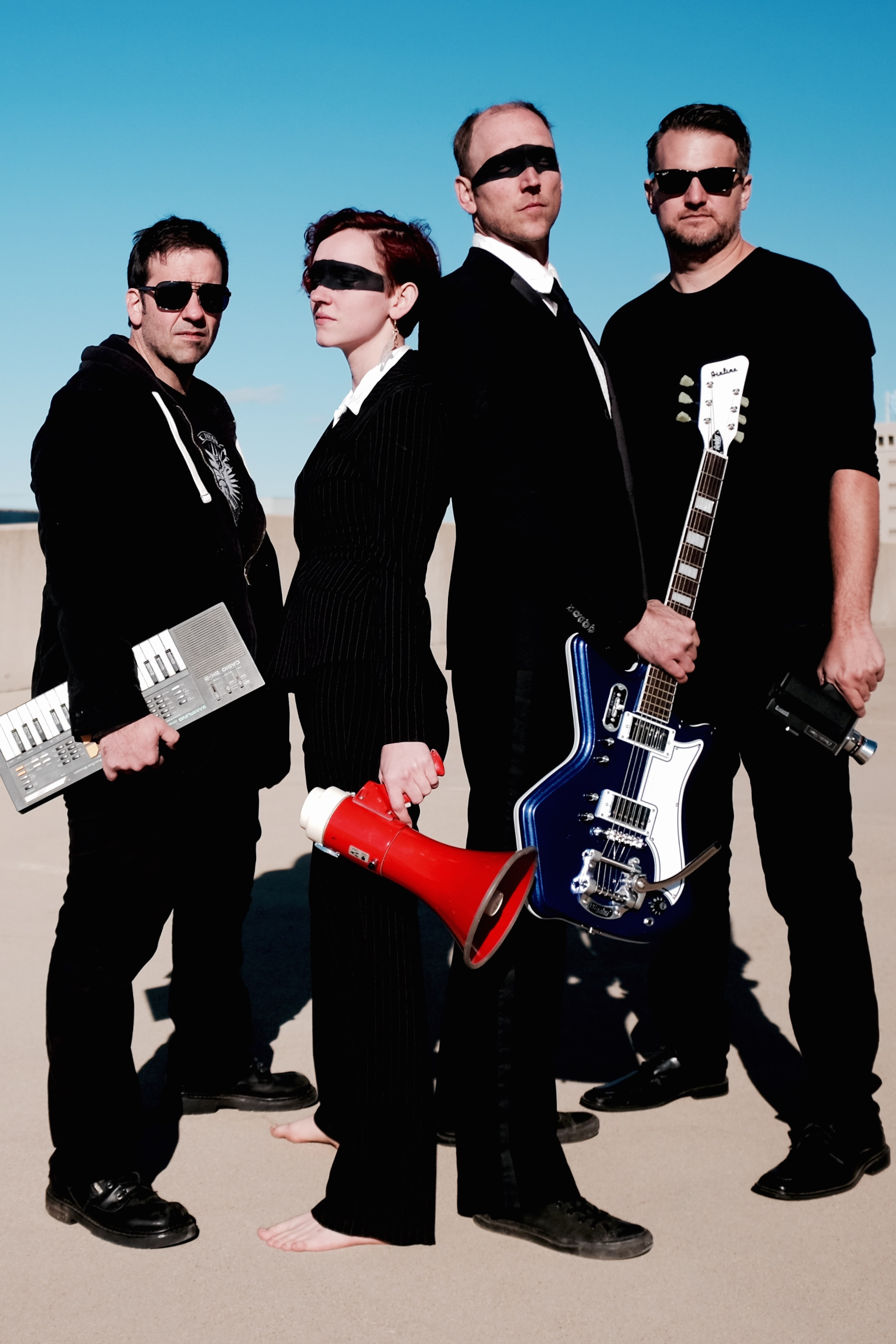
- Earwig 2015

Background information
- Origin: Columbus, Ohio, US
- Genres: Alternative rock, indie rock
- Years active: 1992–present
- Members: Lizard McGee: vocals/guitar Costa Hondroulis: bass James McGee-Moore: vocals Jeremy Skeen: drums
- Past members: Rich Cefalo, Jeff Perkins, Matt Wagner: bass George Hondroulis, Chuck Palmer, Brad Swinarski, Justin Crooks, Nicholas Nocera: drums Terry Lo: guitar/cello
- Website: Earwig's Official Website

Earwig is an indie rock band from Columbus, Ohio. They have released music on micro-indie LFM Records and Anyway Records. The band consists of vocalist and guitarist Lizard McGee, bassist and vocalist Costa Hondroulis, vocalist, keyboardist James McGee-Moore and drummers Jeremy Skeen and George Hondrouls. Their most recent album Pause For The Jets was released in October 2016.

== History ==
=== The beginning ===
In February 1992, the band recorded a 5-song EP on 1/2" 8 track in McGee's garage. The resulting album, entitled "Dead Slow Hoot", was the first release on LFM Records and saw a limited printing of 300 cassettes. The response was promising, and after sending the tape out to zine and record labels, McGee received calls back from labels such as 4AD, Warner Bros. and Capitol Records. At this time, Earwig consisted of Lizard McGee on guitars and vocals, Chuck Palmer on drums and bassist Jeff Perkins. The group was soon joined by Terry Lo on guitar and cello. The four-piece began playing shows as they worked on their debut CD, Mayfeeder. With the release of this CD, Terry Lo and Jeff Perkins left the band and Rich Cefalo joined on bass for the nationwide tour.

Earwig is featured with interview and photo in The Big Takeover Issue No. 61, 2007

=== Mayfeeder-Perfect Past Tense ===
In 1996 drummer Chuck Palmer left the band and was briefly replaced by Brad Swinarski, who played only two shows with Earwig before leaving the band. Swinarski participated in two recording sessions with the band resulting in three released songs: A cover of "Do They Know It's Christmas?" released on the LFM Chris-single cassette, "Anatomical Gift" and "Two Dragons". In 1996, Justin Crooks, formerly the drummer for LFM band Parsnip, joined Earwig on drums. This trio of Rich Cefalo on bass, Justin Crooks on drums, Lizard McGee on guitar and vocals recorded Perfect Past Tense with producers Steve Evans (who also produced the Major Label debut of Thomas Jefferson Slave Apartments on American Recordings) and Jared Kotler (producer of the multi-planinum selling band Marcy Playground on Capitol Records) in Long Island, NY. The band toured the Midwest and east coast, eventually releasing a very limited, hand-pressed, early edition of Perfect Past Tense in late 1999 at a show in Columbus. Cefalo moved to New York City. He went on to direct the music video for the song The Horror, the first single from RjD2’s debut album Deadringer. Rich now plays in the NYC band 'Estranged Estates' with Chuck Palmer, who also moved to New York in 2000, on drums.

=== Move to California ===
McGee moved to California in 2000 and released the widely available version of Perfect Past Tense on CD on LFM Records that same year. That same year he began running LFM Records, increasing their distribution and recognition. Playing live in the Bay Area as a duo with drummer Raj Kapololu, McGee also went on 2 solo tours of the West Coast, playing shows in Seattle, Phoenix, and Los Angeles. McGee and Kapololu also recorded several unreleased demos at Avalon studios in San Jose, CA. McGee returned to Ohio and in 2004 teamed up with bassist Matt Wagner. Previously, when bassist Rich Cefalo moved to New York City and was unavailable, Matt Wagner (of LFM Band Preston Furman) sat in with Earwig on the bass in Athens, Ohio at Follett's Bookstore. Wagner also played bass during 1999 with the "LFM All-Stars" which included Justin Crooks on the drums, Brad Swinarski on keyboards and Lizard McGee on guitar and vocals. Joshua Sheik joined McGee and Wagner for live shows in 2004 and 2005. Sheik left the band in 2005 and drummer Justin Crooks returned to the band. During this time, McGee wrote many off the songs that would become the album Center Of The Earth (released on LFM Records in 2006), featuring Justin Crooks on drums and Matt Wagner on bass. Earwig's only DVD released to date, Year of the Drag, was released in 2005 in between albums Perfect Past Tense and Center of the Earth. Directed, compiled, and edited by Allan Foster, the DVD features eight live performances, including the singles "Used Kids" and "Outro". The DVD also contains rare audio tracks, three never before seen videos, and a photo montage which portrays the development of the band.

=== Dream Writing ===
As songwriter Lizard McGee has stated, many of his songs come from dreams. The song "Used Kids" is a literal re-telling of a fever dream about Y2K and Ron House (founding member of The Great Plains and Thomas Jefferson Slave Apartments). The album Gibson Under Mountain (LFM Records 2010) again features Justin Crooks on drums and Matt Wagner on Bass. New drummer George Hondroulis is also credited on the album. All of the songs on Gibson Under Mountain come from dreams. McGee speculates that these series of connected dreams may have been a result of the heavy medicines he was taking at the time. McGee tells the story of the album title (Gibson Under Mountain): "The album title came in a dream… I'm sitting in the center of a huge movie theater… a white light glows through the movie screen, filling it with large block letters… name your album GIBSON UNDER MOUNTAIN." And from there, all the songs subsequently came from dreams and dream imagery." Other songs resulted from dream visitations from a giant cockroach that spoke in a clicking language and a bloody headless woman.

=== The Hondroulis Brothers and current line up ===
Justin Crooks left the band in 2008 and was replaced by drummer George Hondroulis. His brother, Constantine Hondroulis then joined the band on bass in 2012 with the exit of Wagner. McGee and the Hondroulis brothers began writing and recording songs for a new album in January 2013 with producer Eric French. Earwig's live performances that same year saw the addition of James McGee-Moore on backing vocals. In 2015, George Hondroulis officially left the band to drum and tour full-time with singer-songwriter Lydia Loveless. McGee-Moore joined the band as a full member along as the band completed mixing the new record Pause For The Jets with producer Tom Boyer at GBS Studios in Columbus, Ohio.

=== 2016–2017 ===
The band is currently without a full-time drummer. They have started rehearsals and writing for the next album as a three piece.

== Discography ==
Album	Year	Number of songs
Dead Slow Hoot (cassette)	1992	5
"Dinosaur Song/Wounded Knee" (live) 7" vinyl	1993	2
Mayfeeder	1994	11
Bored in Chicago	1995	9
Perfect Past Tense	2000	13
The Donkey (live)	2005	
Center of the Earth	2006	12
Gibson Under Mountain	2010	11
Pause For The Jets	2016	12

=== Mayfeeder ===
Mayfeeder

Studio album by Earwig
- Genre: Alternative/Rock

Earwig chronology
''Mayfeeder''	Bored in Chicago

Professional ratings
Review scores
Source	Rating
AllMusic	3/5 stars

Earwig's debut album, Mayfeeder, brought the band to the top of the Columbus underground scene, being the catalyst of the greatness to come. "Dinosaur Song", McGee said, was taken verbatim from a dream his girlfriend had. "She woke me up one night and she just turned to me and said, 'I had a dream that we were dinosaurs, with little arms and long tails and big big scales, and you were trying to hold my hand.' I thought it was so perfect that I went and wrote it down. The song's first two verses are essentially the same as what she said to me. A friend of mine made a kid's book from the lyrics."

Despite the bitterness and melancholy evoked by some of Earwig's songs, ("Wounded Knee" and "Mink" come to mind), songwriting isn't necessarily a form of therapy for McGee. "I don't sit down to write a song based on this specific experience, although sometimes I'll look back and say, oh yeah, this is about that time in my life. And a lot of people have mentioned that they see childhood things in my music but I don't look at writing songs like I'm trying to work out a fucked-up childhood or anything. It doesn't stem from problems even if unconsciously my songs are about certain times in my life. I think I'm a pretty well-adjusted person."

=== Bored in Chicago ===
Bored in Chicago

Studio album by Earwig
- Genre: Alternative/Rock

Earwig chronology
Mayfeeder	''Bored in Chicago''	Perfect Past Tense

Professional ratings
Review scores
Source	Rating
AllMusic	4.5/5 stars

Earwig's debut single, "Dinosaur Song/Wounded Knee", was released on LFM in 1993 with their first album, "Mayfeeder", in 1994. Followed by a national tour in the summer of 1994, when "Bored In Chicago" was recorded at a tour stop at the Elbow Room in Chicago. "Bored in Chicago" is taken from a cassette recording of the night's performance at the club. It was extensively bootlegged and eventually "officially" released as Earwig's first Live album in 1995.

In 1996 LFM Records was featured in an article for the Columbus Dispatch. Due to the media hype surrounding the search for the "Next Seattle", the magazine Entertainment Weekly came to Columbus and featured a full page photo of LFM Records/Earwig with an article on how Columbus was a contender for the next big break-out scene in America.

=== Perfect Past Tense ===
Perfect Past Tense

Studio album by Earwig
- Released: September 15, 2000
- Genre: Alternative rock
- Length: 46:26
- Label: LFM Records (Lizard Family Music)

Earwig chronology
Bored in Chicago	''Perfect Past Tense''	Center of the Earth

Professional ratings
Review scores
Source	Rating
AllMusic	4.5/5 stars

Five years after the release of their Mayfeeder album, Earwig resurfaced from the Columbus indie rock underground with 1999's "Perfect Past Tense". Previously available as part of the group's 1994 live effort, Bored In Chicago (recently re-released on CD by McGee's own Lizard Family Music imprint), "Cinema East" reappears as a studio recorded version on this album. "Perfect Past Tense" also includes several other tracks that were previously available only on "Bored in Chicago", including "Sleep With Me", "Dress", "Nineteen", "Anything", and "Stain".

The album is number 8 on Columbus Alive list of "The Top 100 Columbus Albums of the Past 30 Years".

=== Center of the Earth ===
Center of The Earth

Studio album by Earwig
- Released: October 11, 2006
- Genre: Alternative/Rock
- Length: 36:56
- Label: LFM Records (Lizard Family Music)

Earwig chronology
Perfect Past Tense	''Center of The Earth''

Earwig's fourth studio album, Center of the Earth contains one of the band's signature songs, the single "Used Kids", which ranked 15th on WWCD FM's "CD101 Top 101 of 2007".

Center of the Earth was released through the major retail store, Meijer and iTunes.

=== "Used Kids" ===
"The first show I ever played with my first band was at Used Kids. Ron House raved about how he loved the band and thought that we were great. It had an impact on me and I've always loved Used Kids," McGee says. "One night I had a dream. I was at a 7/11 and Ron was working behind the counter. It was a 7/11 but it was Used Kids too. Ron had a big baseball cap with a rebel flag patch on it and kept following me around with a copy of the Weekly World News with the picture of a mushroom cloud that has Jesus' face in it. Ron was spewing about how he wanted to save my soul and how the world was coming to an end. I got very concerned for Ron's well-being and eventually asked him if he needed a ride home from the store. His response was 'Hey man, don't worry, I got a ride. I'm going home with Jesus tonight!' I woke up in a strange daze, grabbed a guitar and wrote the song all the way through, pretty much on the first try, in about 10 minutes. It's a direct re-telling of the dream, blow for blow and a lot of the lyrics are taken verbatim from the dream."

=== Gibson Under Mountain ===
Earwig's fifth studio album was released in June 2010.

=== Pause for the Jets ===
In April, 2013, Earwig began self-recording a "science fiction rock opera" on a Mac laptop Pro Tools software engine. The follow-up to Gibson Under Mountain will be the band's sixth studio album and first to feature the Brothers Hondroulis as the rhythm section.

The single "Wasted On You", a duet with Columbus singer-songwriter Lydia Loveless featured on local radio. The album Pause For The Jets was released in October 2016.
