= Electric Rock Music =

Studio album by Ass Ponys
- Released: 1994
- Recorded: June 1993–June 1994
- Studio: Ultrasuede Studio, Cincinnati, OH
- Genre: Indie rock, country rock
- Length: 44:19
- Label: A&M
- Producer: Ass Ponys, John Curley

Ass Ponys chronology
Grim (1993)	Electric Rock Music (1994)	The Known Universe (1996)

Singles from Electric Rock Music
- 1. "Little Bastard" Released: 1994

Electric Rock Music is the third album, and major-label debut, by Cincinnati-based rock band Ass Ponys. It was released in 1994 on A&M Records. It was produced by John Curley of the Afghan Whigs, at whose Ultrasuede Studio the album was recorded. The band was planning to self-release the album after they recorded it, but then they landed an unexpected deal with A&M when Jeff Suhy, one of the label's representatives, called the band's frontman, Chuck Cleaver on the phone. Suhy told Cleaver that he had pitched a recording of the album to A&M executives, and that they had approved it for release.

== Critical reception ==
Professional ratings
Review scores
Source	Rating
AllMusic	4.5/5 stars
Christgau's Consumer Guide	A–
Entertainment Weekly	B+
Los Angeles Times	3/4 stars
Spin	1/1 star

Ted Simons of the Phoenix New Times described Electric Rock Music as "an engaging collection of episodes and observations put to song." The Chicago Tribune's Rick Reger described the album as "excellent", and as far better as a whole than its well-known single, "Little Bastard." In contrast, the Washington Post's Mark Jenkins wrote that "Most of the album's songs are crisp and shapely, though there's no other track that's so exuberantly tuneful [as "Little Bastard"]." Jason Cohen of Spin wrote that "with Electric Rock Music, the band has made the album of its life." Also in Spin, Jay Stowe called the album a "bright, shining light."

== Track listing ==
1. Grim – 4:31
2. Little Bastard – 2:42
3. Ape Hanger – 3:22
4. Place Out There – 2:58
5. Lake Brenda – 3:40
6. Wall Eyed Girl – 2:48
7. Peanut 93 – 2:40
8. Live Until I Die – 3:11
9. Banlon Shirt – 5:20
10. Gypped – 2:18
11. Blushing Bride – 2:11
12. Earth To Grandma – 2:52
13. Otter Slide – 3:46

== Personnel ==
- Ass Ponys – primary artist, producer
- Randy Cheek – bass, background vocals
- Chuck Cleaver – guitar, vocals
- John Curley – engineer, producer
- John Erhardt – guitar, pedal steel, slide guitar
- Steve Girton – engineer
- David Morrison – drums, organ
- Sunja Park – art direction
- Alan Yoshida – mastering
