= Jenny Mae =

American indie rock singer-songwriter

- Born: Jennifer Mae Leffel; 1968; South Vienna, Ohio
- Origin: Columbus, Ohio
- Died: August 25, 2017 (aged 48–49)
- Genres: Alternative rock Indie rock
- Instruments: Guitar keyboard
- Years active: 1990s–2017
- Label: Anyway

Jennifer Mae Leffel, better known as Jenny Mae (1968–2017), was an American indie rock singer-songwriter, guitarist, and keyboardist. She was active first as a member of the band Vibralux, and later as a solo artist.

== Biography ==
The second of five children, Leffel was born in South Vienna, Ohio in 1968. She became interested in music in elementary school, when she began playing the trumpet, which she proved very gifted at playing by ear. She went on to play trumpet in the marching band at Northeastern High School in Springfield, Ohio, where she was also on the cross country team and became a member of the National Honor Society. She went on to graduate from Ohio State University in 1986.

Leffel started the short-lived bands the Rahvers and Hot Rod before founding Vibralux. In contrast to her previous acts, Vibralux played pop music influenced by her favorite artists – the Beach Boys and the Beatles. Vibralux's style was described by Joel Oliphint of Columbus Alive as "gauzy and delicate". Leffel broke up Vibralux in 1993, and released a split single with Guided By Voices on Anyway Records the same year. In 1994, she married David Olds, whom she had met working at the Capital Club in downtown Columbus.

After briefly moving with her husband to New Orleans and then back to Columbus, Leffel began working on her solo debut album with her former high school boyfriend, Bela Koe-Krompecher. The result, There's a Bar Around the Corner... Assholes, was released on Anyway in 1995. As Leffel lacked a true backup band, the album instead featured contributions from Ted Hattemer and Craig Dunson (both of Thomas Jefferson Slave Apartments) and Jerry Wick (of Gaunt), among others.

After her debut album was released, Leffel performed live with better-known artists such as Cat Power and Neko Case. EMI expressed interest in releasing her second album, which she recorded with Jeff Graham at his Diamond Mine Studios. The resulting album, Don't Wait Up For Me, was released in 1998. She had plans to record a third album, but this had to be shelved when she decided to move to Miami, Florida with Olds. Though Leffel's original plan was to only live in Miami for part of the year, the move nevertheless disrupted her music career in Columbus, as well as her marriage to Olds, which later ended in divorce.

Leffel suffered from alcoholism for many years, in addition to using illicit drugs such as cocaine and ecstasy, which led to her experiencing hallucinations at times. Towards the end of her life, she often lived temporarily with friends, lacking a home of her own for about two years. She performed at ComFest in 2010, a performance later described by Oliphint as "disastrous". She married Johnny Penn Jr. in May 2014, after he was released from jail over domestic violence charges that he had abused her. She died on August 25, 2017, from "complications due to alcoholism", according to Anyway Records.

== Discography ==
=== Singles ===
- If We Wait / Red Chair (split 7" with Guided by Voices, Anyway, 1993)

=== Studio albums ===
- There's a Bar Around the Corner...Assholes (Anyway, 1995)
- Don't Wait Up for Me (Anyway, 1998)

=== EPs ===
- A New World Record (American Pop Project, 1999)
