= Bait and Switch (disambiguation) =

Bait-and-switch is a form of fraud or false advertising. It can also refer to:

== Arts and Media ==
=== Music ===
- Bait and Switch (album) by Thomas Jefferson Slave Apartments (1995)
- "Bait & Switch", a song from the KMFDM album Blitz
- "Bait & Switch", a song from the Saliva album Survival of the Sickest
- Bait and Switch", a track from the Firesign Theatre comedy album Eat or Be Eaten

=== Television ===
- "Bait & Switch", an episode of Fantastic Four: World's Greatest Heroes
- "Bait & Switch", an episode of The Good Guys (2010 TV series)
- "Bait & Switch", an episode of Swamp People
- "Bait and Switch", an episode of Las Vegas
- Bait & Switch, a novel based on the TV show The O.C.

=== Radio ===
- "Bait and Switch", a 2009 episode of This American Life

=== Books ===
- Bait and Switch (book) by Barbara Ehrenreich (2006)
