= John Curley =

John Curley may refer to:

- John Curley (professor), professor of sports journalism and newspaper editor
- John Curley (musician), his son, American musician
- John P. Curley, American college athletics administrator

== See also ==
- Jack Curley, sports promoter
