= Forever Sounds =

Studio album by Wussy
- Released: March 4, 2016
- Recorded: Ultrasuede Studios, Cincinnati, Ohio
- Genre: Indie rock
- Label: Damnably, Shake It Records
- Producer: Jerri Queen, John Hoffman

Wussy chronology
Attica! (2014)	Forever Sounds (2016)	What Heaven Is Like (2018)

Forever Sounds is Wussy's sixth studio album. It was released on March 4, 2016, on Shake It Records in the United States and Damnably in the UK and Europe. The album reached number 20 on the Top Heatseekers album chart.

== Critical reception ==
Professional ratings
Aggregate scores
Source	Rating
Metacritic	79/100
Review scores
Source	Rating
AllMusic	4/5 stars
Robert Christgau	A–
Cincinnati CityBeat	(favorable)
Drowned in Sound	8/10
Pitchfork Media	6.9/10
PopMatters	8/10 stars
Spin	8/10

Upon the album's release, SPIN named Forever Sounds its Album of the Week, awarding it an 8 of 10 rating. Reviewer Jason Gubbels wrote, "The distinct pleasures of Forever Sounds remain those of all five preceding Wussy albums — a crack songwriting duo detailing adult life’s ambiguities with vivid language amid a terrific rhythm section’s unapologetic alt-slop." Robert Christgau gave the album an A− and described it as "the big-guitar record I've been expecting from my favorite band since Strawberry."

== Track listing ==
1. Dropping Houses (Words: Lisa Walker, Chuck Cleaver)
2. She’s Killed Hundreds (Cleaver)
3. Donny’s Death Scene (Walker)
4. Gone (Cleaver)
5. Hello, I’m a Ghost (Cleaver)
6. Hand of God (Walker)
7. Sidewalk Sale (Cleaver)
8. Better Days (Cleaver, Walker)
9. Majestic-12 (Walker)
10. My Parade (Cleaver)

Music on all tracks credited to Wussy.
