= Lohio =

Studio album by Ass Ponys
- Released: June 12, 2001
- Genre: Indie rock
- Length: 46:50
- Label: Checkered Past Records
- Producer: Brad Jones

Ass Ponys chronology
Some Stupid with a Flare Gun (2000)	Lohio (2001)

Lohio is the sixth and final studio album by Ohio-based indie rock band Ass Ponys. It was released on June 12, 2001, on Checkered Past Records. It was produced by Brad Jones, who also produced their previous album, Some Stupid with a Flare Gun. Ass Ponys frontman Chuck Cleaver thought that the album was the Ass Ponys' best, which was one reason the band disbanded soon after it was released.

== Critical reception ==
Professional ratings
Review scores
Source	Rating
AllMusic	3/5 stars
Exclaim!	favorable
No Depression	favorable
PopMatters	favorable
The New Rolling Stone Album Guide	3.5/5 stars
Times Colonist	4/5
The Village Voice	(3-star Honorable Mention)

Lohio received mixed reviews when it was originally released. One favorable review was written by Kevin Oliver of PopMatters, who wrote that the album "provides ample proof of [Ass Ponys'] natural progression into a kind of alternative-universe country rock." In 2012, Ned Lannamann of the Portland Mercury called Lohio "a dark, weird, marvelous album" and "a record of heartland rock that, for once, accurately reflected the state of the American heartland—one troubled by blight, marginalized by big-box businesses, and pepped up on meth."

== Track listing ==
1. Last Night It Snowed – 2:13
2. Kung Fu Reference – 3:47
3. Donald Sutherland – 3:27
4. Black Dot – 3:21
5. Dried Up – 4:06
6. Only – 2:50
7. Fire In The Hole – 3:36
8. (Baby) I Love You (Baby) – 3:20
9. Calendar Days – 3:44
10. Baby In A Jar – 4:18
11. Dollar A Day – 3:00
12. Butterfly – 6:06
13. Nothing Starts Today – 3:05
14. Untitled (Hidden Bonus Track) – 0:38

== Personnel ==
- Bill Alletzhauser- Banjo, Guitar (12 String), Guitar (Acoustic), Guitar (Electric), Guitar (Nylon String), Vibraphone, Vocals (Background)
- Randy Cheek - Arp Odyssey, Bass (Upright), Guitar (Baritone), Guitar (Electric), Mini Moog, Shortwave Radio, Vocals (Background)
- Chuck Cleaver- Clapping, Guitar (Acoustic), Guitar (Electric), Jaw Harp, Vocals, Vocals (Background)
- Robin Eaton- Mixing
- Dave Morrison- Arp Odyssey, Drums, Harmonium, Mini Moog, Organ, Percussion, Piano, Sampling, Vocals (Background)
- Tom Sweet- Graphic Design
