= Some Stupid with a Flare Gun =

Studio album by Ass Ponys
- Released: April 11, 2000
- Genre: Country rock, indie rock
- Length: 50:06
- Label: Checkered Past Records
- Producer: Brad Jones

Ass Ponys chronology
The Known Universe (1996)	Some Stupid with a Flare Gun (2000)	Lohio (2001)

Some Stupid With a Flare Gun is the fifth studio album by Cincinnati-based indie rock band Ass Ponys. It was released on April 11, 2000, on the Chicago-based indie label Checkered Past Records, and was produced by Brad Jones. The album's title is taken from a line in the Deep Purple song "Smoke on the Water." The album won "CD of the Year" in 2001 at the Cammy Awards.

== Critical reception ==
Professional ratings
Review scores
Source	Rating
AllMusic	3/5 stars
In Music We Trust	A–
The New Rolling Stone Album Guide	4/5 stars
PopMatters	8/10
Spin	8/10
Village Voice	A–

Some Stupid with a Flare Gun received mainly positive reviews from critics, one of whom (Robert Christgau), after giving the album an A−, later ranked it #40 on his 2000 end-of-the-year Dean's List for the Pazz & Jop. Another favorable review was written by Fred Mills, who wrote that Chuck Cleaver, the band's lead singer and songwriter, "gives equal weight to life’s little joys and disappointments, employing nuance and economy to great effect." He also praised what he called the band's "unerring sense of melody," calling them "as accessible as they come". David Starkey of PopMatters gave the album an 8 out of 10 rating, calling it "solid" and noting that Cleaver mostly "focuses on the lives of the down-and-out" in his songs.

== Track listing ==
1. Pretty As You Please – 4:29
2. Astronaut – 4:23
3. Fighter Pilot – 3:12
4. Love Tractor – 3:36
5. Your Amazing Life – 2:56
6. Sidewinder – 4:39
7. Swallow You Down – 3:55
8. X-tra Nipple – 3:53
9. Magnus – 4:16
10. Casper's Coming Home – 3:35
11. Kitten – 5:06
12. Between The Trees – 6:06

== Personnel ==
- Chuck Cleaver – vocals
- Bill Alletzhauser – guitar
- Randy Cheek – bass
- David Morrison – drums
- Dale Davis – mastering
