= John David Long =

American politician (1901–1967)

John David Long (1901–1967) also known as John D. Long II, was an American politician, lawyer, and state senator. The John D. Long Lake in Union County, South Carolina is named for him. Long was a public supporter of white supremacy.

== Family background ==
The Long family was long prominent in Union County. The first was his great-grandfather, John D. Long (1811–1897), who was a Confederate soldier and the father of James Gideon Long, who also served in the Confederate Army and later organized the Ku Klux Klan in Union County and was a sheriff for 20 years. His son, James Gideon Long Jr., had ten children, one of whom was John David Long.

== Career ==
Long became a lawyer, a state senator (D), and one of the influential men in Union County, although also an egregious alcoholic given to two-week benders.

On March 2, 1944, the South Carolina state legislature resolute a "pledge to White supremacy" in the Congressional Record, under the sponsorship of Rep. Long.

When in the senate, Long was involved in a 1961–1962 controversy over display of the Confederate Flag, and racial segregation at the American Civil War Centennial observances in the state capital. When President Kennedy ordered the national Centennial Commission to move its ceremonies from segregated facilities to the integrated Charleston Navy Base, the South Carolina delegation held its own, segregated, events at a downtown hotel, where Long – who had sponsored a resolution to display Confederate flags over the daises of the South Carolina House and Senate – addressed the crowd with:

"Out of the dust and ashes of War with its attendant destruction and woe, came Reconstruction more insidious than war and equally evil in consequences, until the prostrate South staggered to her knees assisted by the original Ku Klux Klan and the Red Shirts who redeemed the South and restored her to her own."

Long's son, John David Long III, also became a state senator and sponsored the creation of John D. Long Lake in honor of his father. The John D. Long Lake was later the scene of the Susan Smith murders in 1994.
