= What Heaven Is Like =

Studio album by Wussy
- Released: May 18, 2018
- Genre: Indie rock
- Length: 42:50
- Labels: Damnably; Shake It!

Wussy chronology
Forever Sounds (2016)	What Heaven Is Like (2018)

What Heaven Is Like is the seventh studio album by Cincinnati, Ohio-based indie rock band Wussy. It was released on May 18, 2018, on Shake It! in the United States and on Damnably in the United Kingdom and European Union.

Professional ratings
Aggregate scores
Source	Rating
Metacritic	84/100
Review scores
Source	Rating
AllMusic	4/5 stars
PopMatters	8/10
Slant Magazine	4/5 stars
Spectrum Culture	3.5/5 stars
Vice (Expert Witness)	A−

== Track listing ==
No.	Title	Writer(s)	Original artist	Length
1.	"One Per Customer"	Chuck Cleaver		4:46
2.	"Cake"	Chuck Cleaver, Lisa Walker		3:32
3.	"Gloria"	Lisa Walker		4:37
4.	"Tall Weeds"	Chuck Cleaver, Lisa Walker		4:19
5.	"Firefly"	Lisa Walker		4:51
6.	"Aliens in Our Midst"	Donnie Jupiter	Twinkeyz	4:01
7.	"Skip"	Lisa Walker		3:52
8.	"Oblivion"	Kath Bloom	Kath Bloom	3:40
9.	"Nope"	Chuck Cleaver, Lisa Walker		4:53
10.	"Black Hole"	Lisa Walker		4:19
Total length:				42:50
