= Strawberry (album) =

Studio album by Wussy
- Released: November 2011
- Recorded: 2011
- Genre: Indie rock, folk rock
- Length: 41:59
- Label: Shake It Records
- Producer: Wussy

Wussy chronology
Wussy (2009)	Strawberry (2011)	Attica! (2014)

Professional ratings
Aggregate scores
Source	Rating
Metacritic	84/100
Review scores
Source	Rating
AllMusic	4.5/5 stars
Boston Phoenix	(4/4)
Robert Christgau	(A)
PopMatters	8/10 stars
Rolling Stone	4/5 stars

Strawberry, the fourth studio album by Wussy, was released in November 2011. The label, Shake It Records, released the album on CD format in limited cities in 2011 with a national release in February 2012 and a vinyl edition planned for Record Store Day 2012.

== Critical reception ==
The album received positive reviews. It was chosen as the 8th greatest album of 2011 by prominent critic Robert Christgau. The live edition of the band's first album, Funeral Dress, titled Funeral Dress II, was named the second best album of 2011 on that same list.

Dan Weiss of the Boston Phoenix gave the album four out of four stars, exclaiming, "They don't make bands like this anymore." Jon Dolan gave the album four out of five stars and said that it "[rocks] out in a frayed, mordant way that makes every stick-in-your-head chorus they share seem like a small triumph."

== Track listing ==
1. "Asteroids"
2. "Pulverized"
3. "Waiting Room"
4. "Chicken" - 4:49
5. "Grand Champion Steer"
6. "Magnolia"
7. "Fly Fly Fly"
8. "Mountain of Tires"
9. "Pizza King"
10. "Wrist Rocket"
11. "Little Miami"
