= The Known Universe (album) =

Studio album by Ass Ponys
- Released: April 1996
- Genre: Indie rock
- Length: 78:17
- Label: A&M
- Producer: John Curley

Ass Ponys chronology
Electric Rock Music (1994)	The Known Universe (1996)	Some Stupid with a Flare Gun (2000)

The Known Universe is the fourth studio album by Cincinnati-based indie rock band Ass Ponys, released in April 1996 on A&M Records. It was the band's second album for A&M (after 1994's Electric Rock Music), and was produced by the Afghan Whigs' John Curley.

== Critical reception ==
The Known Universe received favorable reviews from Spin, Rolling Stone, and Details upon its release. Trouser Press' Vickie Gilmer, however, was less favorable, writing of the album that "Sounding like slapdash country kin of the Barenaked Ladies, the Ass Ponys retread familiar soil, relying on exhausted film jokes ("God Tells Me To") and mild outrage ("Cancer Show"), all the while belaboring clichés like "I could rule the world if..." (a self-mocking line Tin Huey used to better effect fifteen years earlier) and real-life oddities like the oft-derided "Satin lives in hell" graffiti."

Professional ratings
Review scores
Source	Rating
AllMusic	4/5 stars
Chicago Tribune	3/4 stars
Christgau's Consumer Guide	(2-star Honorable Mention)
Entertainment Weekly	A–
Los Angeles Times	3/4 stars
Spin	7/10

== Track listing ==
All songs written by Bill Alletzhauser, Randy Cheek, Chuck Cleaver, and David Morrison, except where noted.

1. Shoe Money
2. Under Cedars And Stars (Alletzhauser, Cheek, Cleaver, Jack Ison, Morrison)
3. God Tells Me To
4. Blow Oskar
5. Cancer Show
6. Dead Fly The Birds
7. And She Drowned
8. Redway
9. French Muscleman
10. It's Summer Here
11. John Boat
12. Hagged
13. Some Kind Of Fun

== Personnel ==
- Ass Ponys – producer
- John Curley – engineer, producer
- Steve Girton – engineer
- Jack Ison – keyboards
