= Nope =

Nope usually means "no".

Nope may also refer to:

== Film and television ==
- Nope (film), 2022 American neo-Western science fiction horror film
- "Nope", a 2000 episode of Any Day Now

== Music ==
- "Nope", from the 2007 Soulja Boy Tell 'Em album Souljaboytellem.com
- "Nope", from the 2013 Young Dro album High Times
- "Nope", from the 2013 Snow The Product mixtape Good Nights & Bad Mornings 2: The Hangover
- "Nope", from the 2016 Wilco album Schmilco
- "Nope", from the 2017 Vijay Iyer album Far From Over
- "Nope", from the 2018 Wussy album What Heaven Is Like
- The Nope, a hip-hop group consisting of Moka Only and Psy

== Other ==
- Nope, a surname used by the ruling family of West Timor's Amanuban princedom
- NOPE, the code for the Nanterre-Université service of the Transilien Paris-Saint-Lazare
