= The Whiles =

American indie rock band

- Origin: Columbus, Ohio, United States
- Genres: Indie rock, garage rock
- Years active: 1994–present
- Label: Anyway
- Members: Joe Peppercorn Chris Bolognese; Paul Headley; Jake Remley
- Past members: Zack Prout
- Website: anyway-records.com/site/the-whiles

The Whiles is an American indie rock band, formed in Columbus, Ohio.

== History ==
The founding members are Joe Peppercorn, Matt Peppercorn, Chris Bolognese, Paul Headley, Jake Remley and Zack Prout. Prout left the band after the release of its 2004 debut album, Colors of the Year.

Columbus Alive has referred to The Whiles as a "mainstay band in Columbus" AllMusic gave Colors of the Year four out of five stars, comparing The Whiles to Nick Drake and Gram Parsons. Blogcritics also observed that the album was "Delicately honest, these songs could break in half if not handled with care. The album is filled with lush orchestrations and whispered lyrics, making it feel very personal to the listener."

Columbus Alive described the band's second album, Sleepers Wake (2007), saying "Melancholy grace was in its marrow. This was delicate but substantial music, the kind that makes you feel like your Honda Civic might float off into the atmosphere along with the song." Sentimentalist Magazine observed, "There are occasional quirky harmony and instrumental touches, but 'Sleepers Wake' emits politeness, dismisses cynics and is ultimately rather unique."

Insound, referring to the band's third album, Somber Honey (2012), noted, "The album recalls hints of Colin Blunstone's finest work, Eric Matthews and the pop sensibilities of Tommy Keene, early Cat Stevens and The Byrds."

The band has released three full-length LPs on the Anyway Records label. Prout left after the release of the debut album, Colors of the Year (2004). After the release of Sleepers Wake (2007), family responsibilities put the band on hold until 2012, when The Whiles released the album, Somber Honey. The Whiles are working on a new album.

The band has opened for national acts, including Andrew Bird, My Morning Jacket and The National.

The song "Song for Jerry" (from Colors of the Year) is featured on the soundtrack for the documentary film Murderball.

Peppercorn served as the open-mic host of The Tree Bar, a music venue in Columbus, from 2008 to 2010. He is a member of the band Watershed and is also known locally for performing the entire Beatles catalog in a single session.

== Discography ==
=== LPs ===
- Colors of the Year (2004)
- Sleepers Wake (2007)
- Somber Honey (2012)
- Mercury Ghost (2022)
- Hummingbird (2026)

== See also ==
- List of indie rock bands
