= The Tree Bar =

Music venue and bar in Columbus, Ohio, United States

- Tree Bar, The Treehouse
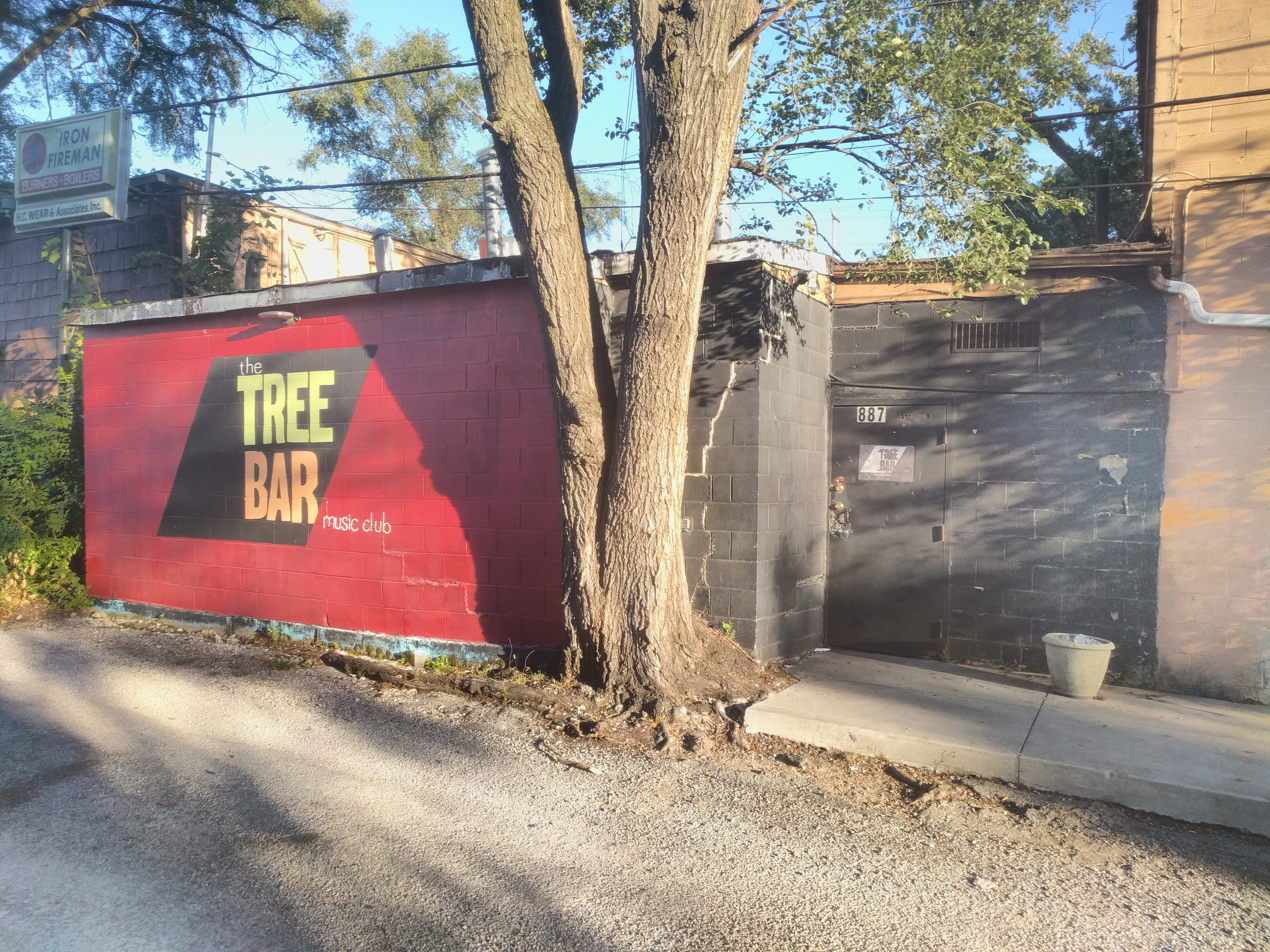
- Interactive map of The Tree Bar
- Former names: The Treehouse, Andyman's Treehouse
- Address: 887 Chambers Rd.
- Location: Columbus, Ohio 43212 USA
- Coordinates: 39.9920°N 83.0305°W
- Type: Nightclub

Construction
- Opened: 1999
- Renovated: 2011

Website
- treebarcolumbus.com

The Tree Bar is a music venue and bar in Columbus, Ohio founded in 1999. It has become known for its underground music scene, and is also known for the silver maple that grew out of the roof of its main performance area before the bar's renovation in 2011. It offers an eclectic mix of local and national acts with genres ranging from DIY, indie rock and heavy metal to pop music and electronic music. For a number of years, the bar has been named one of "The Best Bars in America" by Esquire Magazine.

A number of well-known acts have performed at the Tree Bar including The Rosebuds, Times New Viking, Phantogram, Doug Gillard of Guided by Voices, Tim Easton, Two Cow Garage, Watershed and Joseph Genaro of The Dead Milkmen. The venue also plays host to an open-mic, formerly run by Joe Peppercorn of The Whiles and then by Shane Sweeney of Two Cow Garage. Currently run by Zach Whitney of Brothers.

== History ==
The bar was purchased by Andyman Davis and Quinn Fallon of the X-rated Cowboys in 1999. In 2008, the bar was sold to Robert Palma, after Davis and Fallon took on other responsibilities. The bar name was shortened to "The Treehouse" and management of the bar was left to Robert's son, Phil Palma. A number of difficulties arose, and the bar was closed in August 2011. Columbus Alive referred to the event as the closing of one of Columbus' "unique, beloved institutions".

Shortly after its closing, the bar was purchased by Ryan Haye of Ghost Shirt and Roni Stiffler. The bar was renamed "The Tree Bar" and the silver maple that grew out of the main performance area was cut down, leaving a large stump as evidence of the bar's origins. The bar has since reopened and is being operated by much of its former staff.

In November 2016 the bar was purchased from Ryan Haye and Roni Stiffler. The new owners are updating and upgrading. The live bands remain an integral part of the bar maintaining its "roots" under Andyman Davis and Quinn Fallon.
