= Left for Dead (Wussy album) =

Studio album by Wussy
- Released: 6 November 2007
- Recorded: 2006–2007
- Genre: Indie rock, alternative rock
- Length: 40:43
- Label: Shake It Records
- Producer: Wussy

Wussy chronology
| Funeral Dress (2005) | Left for Dead (2007) | Wussy (2009) |

Professional ratings
Review scores
| Source | Rating |
|---|---|
| Boston Phoenix | 3.5/4 stars |
| Robert Christgau | A |
| No Depression | (favorable) |
| Spin | 4/5 stars |

Left for Dead is the second album by Wussy, released in 2007. It was recorded by all the band's members playing together, rather than in separate tracks, resulting in what NPR described as "a meaty collection of songs with the feel of a garage band always on the verge of spinning out of control." It was chosen as the 14th greatest album of the decade by prominent critic Robert Christgau.

== Track listing ==
1. "Trail of Sadness" (Cleaver, Wussy) – 2:42
2. "Rigor Mortis" (Walker, Wussy) – 4:02
3. "Mayflies" (Walker, Wussy) – 3:09
4. "Millie Christine" (Walker, Wussy) – 3:16
5. "Killer Trees" (Walker, Wussy) – 3:04
6. "Jonah" (Walker, Wussy) – 3:31
7. "What's-His-Name" (Cleaver, Walker, Wussy) – 3:59
8. "Tiny Spiders" (Walker, Wussy) – 5:08
9. "Sun Giant Says Hey" (Cleaver, Walker, Wussy) – 3:19
10. "God's Camaro" (Cleaver, Wussy) – 3:51
11. "Melody Ranch" (Walker, Wussy) – 3:09
12. "Vivian Girls" (Walker, Wussy) – 1:33

== Personnel ==
- Chuck Cleaver – Guitar, Vocals, Keyboards, Jaw Harp
- Lisa Walker – Guitar, Vocals, Keyboards, Vibraphone, Cover Design
- Mark Messerly – Bass Keyboards
- Dawn Burman – Drums
