= Known Universe =

Known Universe or known universe may refer to

- The entire universe
- The observable universe, the part of the universe that can be observed from Earth
- Known Universe (TV series), a program broadcast by National Geographic
- The Known Universe (album), a 1996 album by Ass Ponys
- a misnomer for Known Space, a fictional setting created by Larry Niven
