= Twinkeyz =

American punk rock band

- Origin: Sacramento, California, US
- Genres: Punk rock; Lo-fi music
- Years active: 1977–80
- Labels: Twirp; Grok; Plurex; Anopheles; S.S. Records
- Past members: Donnie Jupiter; Steve Bateman; Tom Darling; Dan Dollar (Honey); Keith McKee; Walter Smith; Wit Witkowski

The Twinkeyz were a punk rock band formed in 1977 in Sacramento, California. They are credited as Sacramento's first punk band, and as one of the first bands to create a "small but thriving new wave scene" in Sacramento.

== History ==
The band's leader and songwriter, Don Marquez, took the stage name Donnie Jupiter upon forming the Twinkeyz in 1977. The name "Twinkeyz" was chosen as a tribute to Twink, drummer for the British group Pink Fairies, rather than as a reference to Twinkies, a snack cake. Jupiter also cited groups such as the Ramones, Television and Blondie as early inspirations for the band.

The group began in Davis, California, as a recording project between guitarists Jupiter and Walter Smith, joined by Keith McKee, a professional touring drummer. David Houston, a Sacramento-based producer, also played synthesizer and recorded the band at his Moon Studios.

In 1977, the band self-released "Aliens in Our Midst", their first single, on a record label they called Twirp. Interest in the single prompted the formation of a live band, which included guitarist Tom Darling, drummer Marc Bonilla, and backup vocalist Wit Witkowski. After the first performance at a house show in San Francisco, Smith left the band. With Jupiter and Darling remaining as the stable core, the band continued with a revolving membership that included Steve Bateman on vocals and percussion, and Dan Dollar (credited as Honey) on guitar, bass, and vocals.

After renaming their label Grok Records, the group re-released "Aliens in Our Midst" in 1978 with a new B-side, "One Thousand Reasons". Their second single, "E.S.P.", was released on Grok in 1978, with the B-side "Cartoon Land".

Alpha Jerk, the first and only LP by the Twinkeyz, was released in 1979 on Plurex Records, a Dutch record label run by Minny Pops founder Wally van Middendorp. It was pressed in a limited edition of 1800 copies. A remixed and remastered version was released in May 2016 by S.S. Records.

Two Twinkeyz compilations have been released on Anopheles Records. The first, Aliens in Our Midst: Complete Recordings 1977–1980 was released as a CD in the United States in 1998, and in Japan in 2000. A second compilation, Cartoon Land, was released on clear vinyl in 2002.

Since disbanding the group in 1980, Marquez has worked primarily as a visual artist, creating paintings and comics.

== Reviews and critical reception ==
According to AllMusic's Richie Unterberger, the Twinkeyz were an early example of the D.I.Y. musical movement, with "obvious influences from '60s psychedelia, Stones-ish rock, and the Velvet Underground":

The band sometimes sounded like a much lighter variation of Lou Reed's ethos, in fact, with a generous sprinkling of science fiction-ish lyrics and nods to pop culture. Jupiter's fairly straight-ahead rock tunes were garnished by burbling psychedelic guitars and synths that seemed to be trying to emulate the Mellotron bursts on '60s albums like the Rolling Stones' Satanic Majesties Request.

=== Alpha Jerk and compilations ===
Alpha Jerk
Review scores
Source	Rating
AllMusic	3/5 stars
The Vinyl District	A−

In a review of the 1979 LP Alpha Jerk, Unterberger called the album a "pastiche of new wave and pre-Paisley Underground sounds, colored by goofy preoccupations with science fiction imagery on songs like 'Aliens in Our Midst' and 'E.S.P.'" Reviewing the 2016 reissue, the Sacramento-based music magazine Submerge wrote that the 1979 release "suffered greatly" from poor mastering, remedied by "ex-KDVS alumni and audiophile Karl Ikola [who] worked alongside Jupiter on this remixed and remastered version. The end result is a delicious, psyche-warping platter way ahead of its time."

In The Vinyl District, Joseph Neff wrote that "the enlightening and appealing Alpha Jerk stands as a worthwhile instance of pre-codified punk form". Neff noted that touchstone proto-punk influences such as the Velvet Underground were "interspersed with the atmosphere of a bunch of guys getting it all down on wax before the rulebook was chiseled into granite."

Aliens in Our Midst (compilation)
Review scores
Source	Rating
Spin	8/10
AllMusic	3/5 stars

Joe Gross called the band "underknown" in Spin's review of the 1998 compilation CD Aliens in Our Midst: Complete Recordings 1977–1980, and added:

The foursome seem thrilled with every scuzzy note they play, cutting their modernized garage-junk blare with treated vocals, acid-zone guitar, plus the occasional synthesizer blurt and Mellotron wash... This collection, featuring the meltdown of "Alpha Jerk" and the feedback pocket symphony of "Wild Love," leaves you thinking you don't need much else in the way of ear candy. The live songs almost overshadow the studio material, their anti-fidelity rumble reaching the kind of apex of high Guided by Voices would kill for. Aliens lets you know both what was and what might have been if the Twinkeyz hadn't vanished into the ether by the dawn of the '80s.

=== "Aliens in Our Midst" ===
The band's first single, "Aliens in Our Midst", has had a continuing critical impact for over 30 years:

- British music journalist Jon Savage described "Aliens in Our Midst", in the 1992 book England's Dreaming: Anarchy, Sex Pistols, Punk Rock, and Beyond, as "peerless garage/psych with a rare gay twist."
- Musician and critic Scott Miller, in his 2010 book Music: What Happened?, called the song a "top-tier DIY classic".
- Author William Burg, in Midtown Sacramento: Creative Soul of the City (2011), reprinted the lyrics of "Aliens in Our Midst" to illustrate Midtown's status as "the preferred environment of Sacramento's aliens, native and adopted."

"Aliens in Our Midst" was covered by Wussy on their 2018 album What Heaven Is Like. Yo La Tengo performed a live cover during a 2011 pledge drive for nonprofit radio station WFMU. A live cover by Game Theory, featuring Donnie Jupiter as a guest performer, appears as a bonus track on the 2014 Omnivore reissue of Game Theory's 1982 debut album Blaze of Glory.

== Recording personnel ==
On the band's 1977 single, "Aliens in Our Midst" b/w "Little Joey", the band's members were listed as Donnie Jupiter (vocals/guitar), Steve Bateman (vocals, percussion), Walter Smith (vocals, guitar, bass), and Wit Witkowski (bass). Keith McKee also performed on drums, and Dave Houston was credited as engineer.

The 1978 recording lineup, listed on the Grok re-release of "Aliens in Our Midst" backed with "One Thousand Reasons", consisted of Keith McKee (drums), Donnie Jupiter (lead vocals & rhythm guitar), and Tom Darling (lead guitar & bass). Dave Houston was credited as producer (with the Twinkeyz), and for synthesizer and special effects (with Jupiter). The same lineup was listed on the sleeve of the 1978 single "E.S.P." b/w "Cartoon Land".

In 1979, the Plurex Records release of Alpha Jerk listed the band as Donnie Jupiter (vocals, guitar, bass), Honey (vocals, bass, guitar), Keith McKee (drums, vocals), and Tom Darling (vocals, guitar, bass). The LP was produced by the Twinkeyz and recorded at Moon Studios; Dave Houston also played bass and synthesizer.
