= Great Planes =

Great Planes may refer to:

- Wings (1988 TV series), originally titled Great Planes
- Great Planes Express, a defunct airline of the United States

== See also ==
- Great Plains (disambiguation)
  - Great Plains, a broad expanse of flatland in North America
