= Wussy (album) =

Studio album by Wussy
- Released: May 2009
- Recorded: 2008–09
- Genre: Indie rock, folk rock, alternative rock
- Length: 42:14
- Label: Shake It Records
- Producer: Wussy

Wussy chronology
Left for Dead (2007)	Wussy (2009)	Strawberry (2012)

Professional ratings
Review scores
Source	Rating
Robert Christgau	A
NPR	(positive)
PopMatters	6/10 stars
Rolling Stone	4/5 stars
Spin	8/10
The Washington Post	(favorable)

Wussy, the third full-length album by the band of the same name, was released in May 2009. The label, Shake It Records, released the album in CD format only.

The album received mostly positive reviews, with NPR's Ken Tucker describing it as "a concept album propelled forward by the band's buzz saw guitar riffs and tight little rhythm section." On October 1, 2009, "Happiness Bleeds" was named the NPR song of the day.

== Track listing ==
1. "Little Paper Birds" – 3:43
2. "Gone Missing" – 3:30
3. "Happiness Bleeds" – 3:22
4. "Muscle Cars" – 4:49
5. "Scream and Scream Again" – 3:14
6. "All the Bugs are Growing" – 3:19
7. "Dreadful Sorry" – 3:34
8. "Magic Words" – 3:22
9. "This Will Not End Well" – 3:21
10. "Maglite" – 2:28
11. "Death by Misadventure" – 3:48
12. "Las Vegas" – 3:49
