= Anyway Records =

American independent record label

Anyway Records is an independent record label based in Columbus, Ohio, which specializes in a Columbus brand of indie rock. It was established in 1991 by Bela Koe-Krompecher, called an "indie stalwart" by Entertainment Weekly.

During the 1990s, the label was considered the most well-known and prolific label in Columbus. The Other Paper called Anyway Records "arguably the most influential indie label in Columbus throughout the last half of the ‘90s." The early 2000s saw a reduction in offerings. However, since 2007, the label has put out records by The Whiles, The Kyle Sowashes, Moviola, and The Lindsay. "Song for Jerry", off of The Whiles album Colors of the Year, appeared on the documentary Murderball. The Whiles album Sleepers Wake was referred to by Columbus Alive as a "masterpiece."

Past releases have included notable artists such as Guided by Voices, the Ass Ponys, the New Bomb Turks, and Jenny Mae.

== Current artists ==
Listed alphabetically

- Appalachian Death Ride
- Connections
- Ghost Shirt
- Kneeling In Piss
- The Kyle Sowashes
- The Lindsay
- Mary Lynn
- Moviola
- St. Lenox
- Thomas Jefferson Slave Apartments
- The Whiles
- Speaking Suns

== See also ==
- List of record labels: A–H
