= Cordelia's Dad =

American band

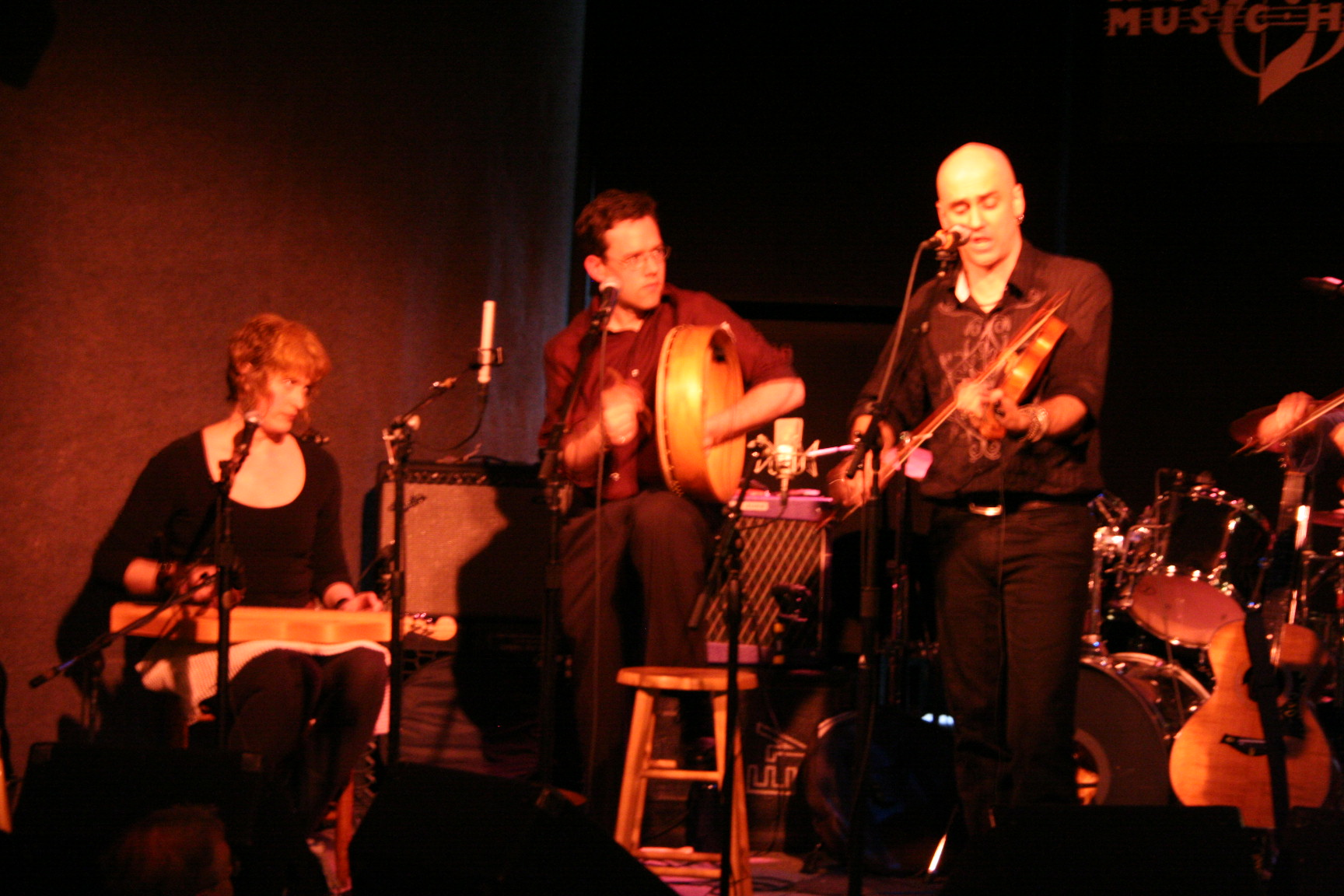
- Cordelia's Dad (left to right: Cavanaugh, Irvine, Eriksen) at the 20th Anniversary reunion show, April 29, 2007.

Background information
- Origin: Northampton, Massachusetts
- Genres: Folk, folk punk, alternative rock
- Years active: 1987–
- Labels: OKra, Return to Sender, Omnium, Scenescof, Appleseed, Kimchee, Normal, Dark Beloved Cloud
- Members: Tim Eriksen; Peter Irvine; Eliza Cavanaugh; Gerard Gualberto; Zoe Darrow
- Past members: Tom King (1987–93); Bradford West; Steve Maggs; Becky Miller (1993–95); Rani Arbo; Cath Oss (1993–2001); Laura Risk (1996–?)
- Website: cordeliasdad.com

Cordelia's Dad is a folk punk band from Northampton, Massachusetts, that combines folk and punk rock influences and was instrumental in the creation of the genre later to be dubbed "No Depression". The band formed in 1987 and was active until 1998, when the members relocated to different parts of the country. After releasing an album of older material in 2002 the band reunited in 2007 for their twentieth anniversary.

== Career ==
Cordelia's Dad was founded in 1987 by Amherst College students Tim Eriksen (bass, vocals), Peter Irvine (drums), Tom King (guitar). Although all three had previous experiences with traditional American music their initial sound was closer to that of alternative rock bands like Dinosaur Jr. and accordingly they recorded their first, eponymous album at Fort Apache Studios in Boston. The main distinguishing characteristic from their Fort Apache peers was that with few exceptions, their early recorded output consisted entirely of Anglo-American traditional folk tunes recorded as rock songs. Their second album How Can I Sleep, recorded by Dave Schramm continued the prominent use of traditional material, but increased the share of songs played as acoustic folk songs, starting a trend to call the sound of the band "schizophrenic". The transition to folk outfit was completed in 1993 with the recording of the limited release mini-album The Joy Fun Garden for German mail order label Return to Sender (a sublabel of Normal Records, which released all Cordelia's Dad albums in Germany). King left after the recording to be replaced by bassist Cath Oss. Eriksen switched to guitar and their third regular album, Comet (1995) continued the conversion toward an acoustic sound, with only a single song, the closer "Jersey City", being played with rock instruments.

In 1996, the band released the punk-infused live album Road Kill (1996) as a farewell to their rock side, which for the next years would continue only as a side project named "io". The members of the main, now fully acoustic band had previously taken up shape note singing, and the new interest made an appearance on the Steve Albini produced album Spine (1998), for which folk fiddler Laura Risk joined the band. Spine would become their most critically acclaimed album, but also the last for four years, as band members moved away from their Western Massachusetts home base. Irvine moved to Portland, Oregon to become a music lawyer, Oss moved to Newcastle Upon Tyne, later joining Spraydog, while Eriksen moved to Minneapolis and later participated in creating the soundtrack for the movie Cold Mountain.

The album What It Is, while released in 2002, contained music recorded during two sessions in 1997–98, and the band remained in hiatus until Eriksen and Irvine moved back to Massachusetts, and to celebrate their 20th anniversary, decided to reunite for local shows, playing both acoustic and electric sets.

== Discography ==
- 1990 Cordelia's Dad (OKra) Allmusic review
- 1992 How Can I Sleep? (OKra) Allmusic review
- 1993 The Joy Fun Garden (Return to Sender, limited release) Allmusic review
- 1995 Comet (Omnium) Allmusic review
- 1996 Road Kill (Scenescof, live album) Allmusic review
- 1998 Spine (Appleseed) Allmusic review
- 1998 "How Can I Keep from Singing?", song on Where Have All the Flowers Gone: The Songs of Pete Seeger (Appleseed) Allmusic review
- 2002 What It Is (Kimchee) Allmusic review | Various reviews
- 2003 "Jane"/"Promise"/"Closing Year" three-song EP (Dark Beloved Cloud)
- 2011 "Double Live" one disc acoustic, one disk electric
