= OKra Records =

OKra Records was a Columbus, Ohio-based independent record label established in the late 1980s. It was founded by Dan Dow, the former guitarist for the Gibson Bros. and the former owner of Used Kids Records, which he “co-founded” with Ron House (of Thomas Jefferson Slave Apartments and Great Plains) in 1986. According to Cordelia's Dad drummer Peter Irvine, OKra was run almost entirely by Dow himself. The label stopped putting out records in 1993.

== Artists ==
- Ass Ponys
- Cordelia's Dad
- The Fellow Travellers
- Hank McCoy & the Dead Ringers
- High Sheriff Ricky Barnes & The Hoot Owls
- The Schramms
- The Wolverton Brothers
