= Laura Risk =

California-born violinist

Laura Risk is a California-born violinist. She specializes in performing and teaching the diverse fiddle repertoire of Scotland and Quebec.

Risk performs both solo and in collaboration with such artists as Sandy Silva, Ken Kolodner, and Paddy League. She has been part of the band Cordelia's Dad. In addition to performing, Risk was a music instructor at Wellesley College. She holds a Bachelor of Arts in applied mathematics from the University of California at Berkeley.

In 2006 she joined with Kieran Jordan and Paddy League to form the band "Tritych". Their eponymous album was released in 2011.

== Discography ==
=== Solo recordings ===
- Two Thousand Miles (RISK0401) with Eric Beaudry (guitar and voice), Rachel Aucoin (piano), Michel Donato (bass), Eric Breton (percussion)
- The Merry Making (Dorian 90282) with Susie Petrov (piano), Dennis Cahill (guitar), Christopher Layer (flutes, whistle and bagpipes), Brian Melick (percussion)
- Celtic Dialogue (Dorian 90264) with Jacqueline Schwab (piano) (Top 10 CDs of 1999—The Boston Globe)

=== In collaboration with Ken Kolodner ===
- A Roof for the Rain (Dorian 90295) with Keith Murphy (guitar) and Joseph Sobol (guitar and cittern)
- Greenfire (Dorian 90265) with Robin Bullock (guitar, piano, cittern)
- Walking Stones (Dorian 90248) with Robin Bullock (guitar, piano, cittern) (Top 15 Bestsellers—BMG Record Club) (Allegro Corporation's #1 World Music Title)

=== With other bands ===
- Journey Begun, Laura Risk and Athena Tergis (Culburnie 105) with Steve Baughman (guitar), Peter Maund (percussion), Pat Klobas (bass); produced by Alasdair Fraser
- Spine, Cordelia's Dad (Appleseed 1023) with Tim Eriksen (vocals, guitar), Cath Oss (vocals, lap dulcimer and accordion) Peter Irvine (vocals and percussion); produced by Steve Albini
- Host of the Air: Contemporary Music for Scottish Country Dancing with Susie Petrov (accordion), James Gray (piano)

=== Recordings produced by Laura Risk ===
- Some Melodious Sonnet, Hanneke Cassel (Cassel Records 2004)
- My Joy, Hanneke Cassel (Cassel Records 2001)

=== Guest appearances ===
- Petit Fou, Matapat (Borealis 113)
- The Honey on the Mountain, Rob Laurens (Attic Light 339-002)
- My Joy, Hanneke Cassel (Cassel Records 2001)
- Different Game, Lissa Schneckenberger (Footprint Records)

=== Compilations ===
- The Road from Erin: Ireland's Musical Legacy, (Dorian 90021) various artists
- Commuter Classics: Drive Time A.M. (Dorian 90018) various artists
- Visions of Bach: Transcriptions and arrangements inspired by Bach (Dorian 90016), various artists
- Christmas Gift (Dorian 90321), various artists

=== Books ===
- Fiddler Magazine's Favorites: Tunes from and Interviews with 36 of the World's Greatest Fiddlers (book and CD set), various artists
