= John D. Long Lake =

Lake in South Carolina, United States

- Location within South Carolina
- Location: Union County, South Carolina
- Coordinates: 34°46′30″N 81°30′44.4″W
- Basin countries: United States
- Surface area: 80 acres (0.32 km^{2})
- Max. depth: 80 ft (24 m)
- Surface elevation: 440 ft (130 m)

John D. Long Lake is an 80-acre (32 ha) man-made lake in Union County, South Carolina. It is used for fishing, with largemouth bass, bluegill, shellcracker (redear sunfish), and catfish in the lake. There is a boat ramp and a fishing pier.

== Location and geography ==
The lake is located about 3 miles (4.8 km) west of Lockhart, the nearest town, and about 7 miles (11 km) northeast of Union, the nearest city. It lies about two miles north of the northern boundary of Sumter National Forest, and the shores are mostly wooded, with poplars, black gum trees, and loblolly pines prevailing; cedar trees were planted in the 2010s. Hughes Creek both feeds and drains the lake, running south into it and southwards out of it to the Broad River. The elevation is 440 feet (130 m), and the depth exceeds 80 feet (24 m).

South Carolina Highway 49 (which runs between Union and Lockhart) passes just south of the lake. South Carolina Highway 105 originates at an intersection with Highway 49 directly southeast of the lake and runs north, and South Carolina Highway 9 passes about 1.5 miles (2.4 km) north of the lake.

Access to the western end of the lake, where the fishing pier and boat ramp is located, is via Black Bottom Road which connects to Highway 9. Access to the eastern end is from John D. Long Lake Road which connects to Highway 49. This gives out on a small parkland near the dam, where the boat ramp was formerly located.

== History ==
My late father...always wanted a place to fish, and after I got some seniority in the Senate, I could get enough money for the lake, so I got it and named it in his honor.

— John David Long III, Washington Post

The lake was created in the 1970s on the initiative of South Carolina state senator John David Long III and named for his father, John David Long, also a South Carolina state senator. An earthen dam was built at a pasture on Hughes Creek to fill it.

Nine people have died at the lake's old boat ramp, which had been located near the dam at the eastern end. In 1994, Susan Smith drowned her two sons there, in a case which attracted national attention. Granite memorials were raised to the boys, and many visitors came. In 1996 seven people died when their car rolled down the boat ramp into the lake, after which the memorials were moved and the boat ramp dug up and grassed over.

On July 1, 2013, the lake was closed for two years for renovation and restoration by the South Carolina Department of Natural Resources. The balance between the bream (specifically bluegill and shellcracker) and largemouth bass populations had become upset and the lake had become overcrowded with bass. The state stunned and relocated the bass, drained the lake, cut and planted trees, and laid down 635.7 short tons (576,700 kg) of gravel to create spawning grounds for bluegill and shellcracker. The lake was refilled, and reopened for fishing on July 1, 2015; catfish were introduced later.
