= Great Plains (disambiguation) =

The Great Plains is a large, flat region of land in North America.

Great Plains may also refer to:

== Music ==
- Great Plains (Ohio band), a 1980s folk pop band
- Great Plains (Tennessee band), a progressive country pop band that formed in 1987
- "The Great Plains", a song by Scale the Summit from the 2009 album Carving Desert Canyons

== Other uses ==
- Great Plains Aircraft Supply Company, an American company
- Great Plains Airlines, a defunct airline
- Great Plains Software, an American software company sold to Microsoft
- Great Plains, a clothing brand of French Connection

== See also ==
- Great Hungarian Plain, a plain occupying the majority of the modern territory of Hungary
