= Hanneke Cassel =

American folk violinist

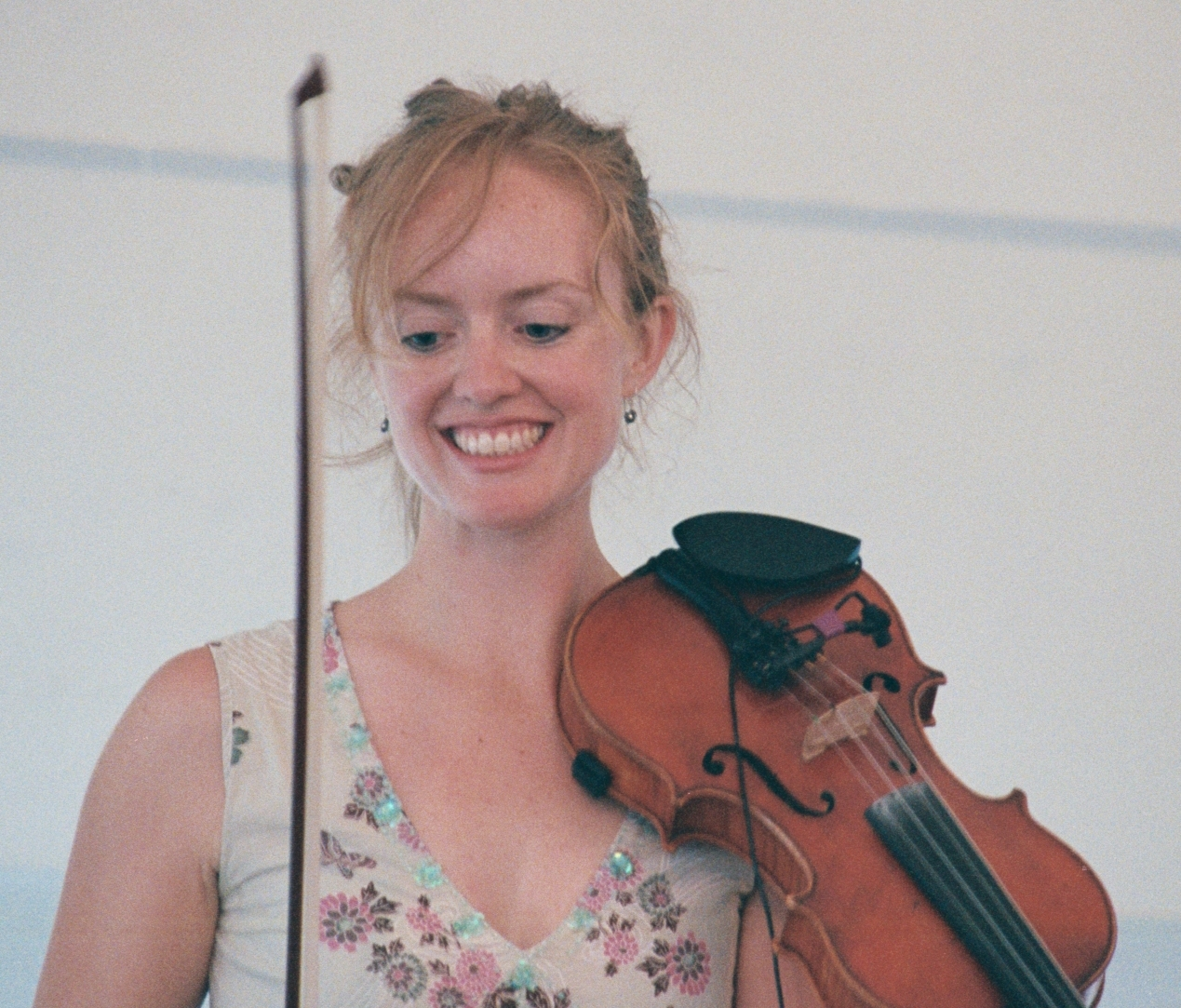
- Cassel in 2005

Background information
- Genres: Folk
- Occupation(s): Violinist, teacher
- Instrument: violin
- Website: http://www.hannekecassel.com

Hanneke Jewel Cassel (born April 14, 1978) is an American folk violinist. She was raised in Oregon and graduated with a Bachelor of Music in Violin Performance at Berklee College of Music in 2000. Hanneke is the 1997 United States National Scottish Fiddle Champion, and she has performed and taught across the United States, Scotland, Sweden, China, New Zealand, France, England, and Australia.

Her debut album, My Joy, received the following feedback from Alasdair Fraser:

"A great debut album by one of the most talented and fun-loving young fiddlers you could ever hope to meet! This is fiddle music played with great stylistic integrity and personal flair - definitely a joy to listen to! Go Hanneke, and gie it laldie!"

== Awards ==
- 1998 Berklee College of Music String Department Award
- 1997 U.S. National Scottish Fiddle Champion
- 1996 Oregon State Texas-style Grand Fiddle Champion
- 1996 Berklee College of Music U.S. Scholarship Tour Award
- 1992 and 1994 U.S. National Junior Scottish Fiddle Champion

== Discography ==
- Trip to Walden Pond (© 2017 Cassel Records) (release date April 14, 2017)
- Dot the Dragon's Eyes (© 2013 Cassel Records)
- For Reasons Unseen (© 2009 Cassel Records)
- Calm the Raging Sea (© 2007 Cassel Records)
- Silver (© 2006 Cassel Records), produced by Laura Risk
- Some Melodious Sonnet (© 2004 Cassel Records), produced by Laura Risk
- Many Happy Returns (© 2003 Cassel Records)
- My Joy ( © 2001 Cassel Records), produced by Laura Risk
- Darol Anger’s Diary of a Fiddler (© 1999 Compass Records)
- The Wee Hours: Future of Scottish Fiddling in America (© 1998 Gargoyle Records)

== See also ==
- Laura Risk
