= The Fellow Travellers =

American band

The Fellow Travellers were an American band formed in 1990 by Jeb Loy Nichols, Martin Harrison of On-U Sound Records, and Nichols' wife, vocalist Loraine Morley. The band released three albums during their history. The band's sound was influenced by many disparate genres, including country music, dub music, folk music, and reggae. They have been called "the world's only country/dub band".

== Discography ==
- No Easy Way (OKra, 1990)
- Just a Visitor (OKra, 1992)
- Things and Time (OKra, 1993)
