= Dana Adam Shapiro =

American film director

Dana Adam Shapiro is an American film director, best known for his directorial work on the 2006 Academy Award-nominated documentary Murderball.

== Career ==
Dana Adam Shapiro is a journalist, novelist, and filmmaker. He was nominated for the 2006 Academy Award for his first film, Murderball, a feature documentary about the US Paralympic rugby team. Murderball was the recipient of the Audience Award at the 2005 Sundance Film Festival, as well as the Gotham Independent Film Award for “Best Documentary”, and is widely considered one of the best-reviewed sports film of all time. Dana Shapiro's documentary, Daughters of the Sexual Revolution, won the Louis Black “Lone Star Award” at the 2018 SXSW Film Festival, and is currently in development as a scripted series with Charlize Theron's Denver & Delilah and Warner Bros.

His first narrative film, Monogamy, starring Chris Messina and Rashida Jones, won the Special Jury Prize for “Best Narrative” at the 2010 Tribeca Film Festival and was nominated for a 2011 Independent Spirit Award for "Best First Screenplay, and was released theatrically by Oscilloscope Laboratories.

For two seasons (2018-2019), Shapiro was a producer/writer on CBS's Strange Angel, a scripted series about Jack Parsons, the Thelemic occultist who practiced sex magick while revolutionizing the rocket industry during World War II.

Shapiro's 2007 animated short My Biodegradable Heart was an official selection at the 2008 Sundance Film Festival and many other fests around the world.

== Other work ==
Shapiro is a former senior editor at SPIN magazine, a founding editor and senior writer of Icon Magazine, and he is a contributor to The New York Times Magazine and other publications.

His debut novel, The Every Boy (published by Houghton Mifflin), is a New York Times Editors' Choice and a 2005 Book Sense Notable Book that he adapted into a Black List script.

His second book, "You Can Be Right (or You Can Be Married): Looking for Love in the Age of Divorce" was released on September 4, 2012, is non-fiction about divorce, was featured on The Today Show, and optioned by CBS.

He was the 2007 Artist-in-Residence at Bucknell University in Lewisburg, Pennsylvania.

== Personal life ==
Shapiro currently lives in Venice, California.
