= Funeral Dress (album) =

Album by Wussy

Studio album by Wussy
- Released: December 2005
- Recorded: 2005
- Genre: Indie rock, country rock, alternative rock
- Length: 35:47
- Label: Shake It Records
- Producer: Wussy

Wussy chronology
Funeral Dress (2005)	Left for Dead (2007)

Professional ratings
Review scores
Source	Rating
AllMusic	3/5 stars
Robert Christgau	(A)
No Depression	(favorable)

Funeral Dress, the debut album by Wussy, was released on December 6, 2005. The label, Shake It Records, released the album on CD format only.

The album received mostly positive reviews. It was chosen as the 4th greatest album of the decade by prominent critic Robert Christgau.

In 2015, SPIN ranked Funeral Dress #252 on their list of the 300 best albums of the last 30 years.

== Track listing ==
1. "Airborne" (Lisa Walker, Chuck Cleaver) – 3:17
2. "Funeral Dress" (Walker, Cleaver, Mark Messerly) – 3:59
3. "Soak It Up" (Walker) – 2:55
4. "Shunt" (Cleaver) – 3:18
5. "Conversation Lags" (Walker, Cleaver, Messerly) – 3:08
6. "Crooked" (Walker) – 3:13
7. "Humanbrained Horse" (Cleaver) – 3:46
8. "Motorcycle" (Walker) – 3:56
9. "Yellow Cotton Dress" (Cleaver) – 2:17
10. "Bought It Again" (Walker, Cleaver) – 3:44
11. "Don't Leave Just Now" (Walker, Cleaver) – 3:46

== Acoustic album ==
Wussy released an acoustic version of the album, titled Funeral Dress II, for Record Store Day on April 16, 2011, at Shake It Records in Northside, Cincinnati.

== Personnel ==
Wussy

- Lisa Walker - vocals, guitar, organ
- Chuck Cleaver - vocals, guitar
- Mark Messerly - vocals, bass, keyboards, guitar, mandolin, harmonica, accordion, bells
- Dawn Burman - drums, percussion
