= Tom House (musician) =

American singer-songwriter and poet (born 1949)

- Born: 1949 (age 76–77); Durham, North Carolina
- Origin: Nashville, Tennessee
- Genres: folk, singer-songwriter, country
- Years active: 1997–present
- Labels: Checkered Past, Mud, Catamount

Tom House (born 1949 in Durham, North Carolina) is an American singer-songwriter and poet whose music combines elements of country, singer-songwriter, and folk.

== Biography ==
House wrote hundreds of poems during the two decades before 1997. Of these, three had been included in The Bicentennial Edition of the Tennessee Anthology of Poetry. From 1982 to 1988, he edited and published the journal raw bone, which was known for publishing spare, brutal writing. House's first recording to be released was "The Hank Williams Memorial Myth", a spoken-word intro to the 1996 compilation album Nashville: The Other Side Of The Alley. In 1997, he released his debut album, The Neighborhood Is Changing, on Checkered Past Records. The album featured multiple members of Lambchop. As of 2012, he had released a total of 13 albums.

== Critical reception ==
Greil Marcus wrote in Esquire that House's 1998 album This White Man's Burden was "an extraordinary collection of warnings and threats, and it sounds as if it came right out of the ground." He later named the album his 6th favorite of 1998. Robert Christgau, however, was less favorable in his review of the album, awarding it a "neither" rating, indicating that it "may impress once or twice with consistent craft or an arresting track or two. Then it won't." Jim Caligiuri of the Austin Chronicle wrote that House's third album, 'Til You've Seen Mine, was "easily his most accomplished" and gave it 3 out of 4 stars. Erik Hage of No Depression wrote that on House's 2004 album That Dark Calling, "House is still very much his own man, but there's a levity to his approach here that suggests the singer is perhaps more concerned with healing than drumming up haints and spooks." Andy Whitman of Paste wrote that on the album, "House is a fine songwriter with a great eye for detail, but his dour sensibilities become oppressive after a while."

== Discography ==
- The Neighborhood Is Changing (Checkered Past, 1997)
- This White Man's Burden (Checkered Past, 1998)
- 'Til You've Seen Mine (Munich, 1999)
- Jesus Doesn't Live Here Anymore (Catamount, 2001)
- Long Time Home From Here (Catamount, 2003)
- That Dark Calling (Catamount, 2004)
- The Last Desperate Man (Catamount, 2008)
- Burning With the Message (self-released, 2008)
- Winding Down the Road (Mud, 2012)

=== Appearances ===
- Nashville: The Other Side Of The Alley (Bloodshot, 1996)
