= Ron House =

American singer and songwriter

Ron House is an American punk rock singer and songwriter from Columbus, Ohio. He was the frontman of the bands Great Plains and Thomas Jefferson Slave Apartments. He is known for his high-pitched, nasal singing voice.

== Biography ==
Originally from Wooster, Ohio, House moved to Columbus to attend Ohio State University. Early in his career, he was the frontman of Moses Carryout, Twisted Shouts, and Ron & the True Believers. His band Great Plains started in 1983 with the release of the EP Mark, Don & Mel. It went on to release albums on Homestead Records and Shadowline Records later in the decade. After Great Plains had broken up, House started Thomas Jefferson Slave Apartments, of which he served as the lead singer throughout the 1990s. During this time, he also became part owner of the Columbus-based record store Used Kids, where he worked at the counter for twenty years.

House's first solo studio album was Obsessed, which he released on his own label, Moses Carryout Records, in 2002. It featured a more folk-centered sound than the punk music he had made with his previous bands. He later started another band, the Counter Intuits, with Times New Viking's Jared Phillips. Their debut album, Sheets of Hits, was released in 2013 on House's own imprint, Pyramid Scheme. It was followed by 2016's Monosyllabilly and the 2018 single "Edge".
