= Susan Smith =

American murderer (born 1971)

- Smith in 2012
- Born: Susan Leigh Vaughan; September 26, 1971 (age 55); Union, South Carolina, U.S.
- Spouse: David Smith (m. 1991; div. 1995)
- Children: Michael Daniel (1991–1994); Alexander Tyler (1993–1994)
- Status: Incarcerated
- Conviction: Murder (2 counts)
- Penalty: Life imprisonment with the possibility of parole after 30 years; Parole denied (2024); Parole denied (2026)

Details
- Imprisoned at: Leath Correctional Institution

Susan Leigh Smith (née Vaughan; born September 26, 1971) is an American woman who was convicted of murdering her two sons, three-year-old Michael and one-year-old Alexander, in 1994, by strapping her children in their car seats, and rolling her car into John D. Long Lake in South Carolina.

The case gained international attention because of Smith's false claim that a Black man had kidnapped her sons during a carjacking. Her defense attorneys, David Bruck and Judy Clarke, called expert witnesses to testify that she had mental health issues that impaired her judgment when she committed the crimes.

Smith was sentenced to life in prison with the possibility of parole after 30 years. Smith was first eligible for parole on November 20, 2024, which was denied. She is incarcerated at the Leath Correctional Institution near Greenwood, South Carolina.

== Family background ==
Smith's father died by suicide when she was six years old, and Smith herself attempted suicide at age 13. Her mother then married Beverly C. Russell Jr. who later was revealed to have molested Smith when she was a teenager. Russell was a local businessman who later gained prominence in South Carolina's Republican Party and the Christian Coalition. In 1995, the Charlotte Observer reported that unnamed sources claimed that Smith had told a psychiatrist in 1989 that the sexual contact was a consensual "affair", and that in 1995, Russell had said that sexual relations between them continued until six months before the murders.

After graduating from high school in 1989, Smith made a second suicide attempt after a married man she was in a relationship with ended their affair. She married David Smith, and they had two sons.

== Crimes ==
On October 25, 1994, Smith reported to police that she had been the victim of a carjacking by a Black man while driving her 1990 maroon Mazda Protégé sedan with her sons – Michael, aged three, and Alexander, aged 14 months – still in the back seat. For nine days, she made dramatic pleas on national television for their safe return. However, following an intensive investigation and a nationwide search for them, she confessed on November 3, 1994, to letting her car roll into nearby John D. Long Lake, drowning them inside. Her motivation was reportedly to facilitate a relationship with a local wealthy man named Tom Findlay. Prior to the murders, he sent her a letter ending their relationship and expressing that he did not want children. She said there was no motive nor did she plan the murders, stating that she was not in a right state of mind.

Later revelations indicated that detectives doubted Smith's story from the start and believed that she murdered her sons. By the second day of the investigation, the police suspected that she knew their location and hoped that they were still alive. Investigators started to search the nearby lakes and ponds, including John D. Long Lake, where their bodies were eventually found. Initial water searches did not locate the car because the police believed it would be within 30 feet off the shore, and did not search further; it turned out to be 122 feet from the shore. After the boys had been missing for two days, Smith was subjected to a polygraph test. A significant breakthrough in the case was her description of the carjacking location. She had claimed that a traffic light had turned red, causing her to stop at an otherwise empty intersection. However, it was determined that the light would not have turned red for her unless another vehicle was present on the intersecting road. This conflicted with her statement that she did not see any other cars there when the carjacking took place.

=== Trial ===
In 1995, David Bruck and Judy Clarke served as co-counsel for Smith. In their opening statement, Clarke argued Smith was deeply troubled and experienced severe depression. Clarke told the jury: "This is not a case about evil. This is a case about despair and sadness." The defense's theory of the case was that Smith drove to the edge of the lake to kill herself and her two sons, but her body willed itself out of the car. However, the prosecution contended she murdered her sons in order to start a new life with a former lover. It took the jury two and a half hours to convict her of murdering them. During the penalty phase, Tommy Pope, the lead prosecutor, argued passionately in favor of sentencing Smith to death. The jury ultimately voted against imposing the death penalty. Smith was sentenced to two concurrent life terms in prison in 1995 for the murders of her two sons. Smith's defense psychiatrist diagnosed her with dependent personality disorder and major depression.

== Incarceration ==
Smith was originally incarcerated in the Administrative Segregation Unit in the Camille Griffin Graham Correctional Institution in Columbia, South Carolina.

In 2000, two correctional officers at the Camille Griffin Graham Correctional Institution were charged after having sexual intercourse with her. Consequently, she was moved to the Leath Correctional Institution in Greenwood.

Smith was denied parole at her first eligibility in November 2024 and again in November 2026.

== In popular culture ==
In the prison-drama Oz the only female prisoner, Shirley Bellinger, was based on Smith.

The season three premiere of Arrested Development ("The Cabin Show") features a flashback scene in which Lucille Bluth (Jessica Walter), having recently gone off her postpartum medication, is watching a news story about Smith, and says, "Good for her!"— much to the concern of her son Buster (Tony Hale). The end of the episode features Lucille walking away from her car, with Buster asleep in the back seat as it rolls into a nearby body of water.

Season 6, Episode 8 ("Angel") of Law and Order was based on her case, specifically that the mother in the episode claimed a Puerto Rican man stole the baby, much like how Smith claimed a Black man carjacked her. When Detective Lennie Briscoe (Jerry Orbach) brings up the possibility of the mother killing the missing baby, his partner, Detective Rey Curtis (Benjamin Bratt) says, "You're not gonna find her baby in a car at the bottom of some lake".

Blind Melon's song "Car Seat (God's Presents)," from their 1995 album Soup, was inspired by the Susan Smith murders, as was the Tom House song "I'm in Love with Susan Smith". The song "When This Is Over", on Hayden's 1995 album Everything I Long For, is written from the point of view of one of Smith's sons as the car sinks into the lake. The first song released by Red Star Belgrade, "Union, S.C.", is written from Smith's perspective. "Paper Gown", a song from folk singer Caroline Herring's 2014 album Lantana, takes the form of a murder ballad from Smith's point of view. The song "Desensitized" by Boston hardcore band Slapshot from 16 Valve Hate starts with a reference to Susan Smith and the case.

Smith appears briefly in archival footage in the 2002 film Bowling for Columbine in a scene about "dangerous Black guys".

In South Park's fifth season episode "Butters' Very Own Episode", Linda Stotch attempts to drown her son Butters in a similar manner after finding out that her husband, Chris, has been using anniversary gift shopping trips as a cover for visiting a gay bathhouse and a pornographic theater. Linda then claims that her son had been abducted by "some Puerto Rican guy", before Butters makes his own way back home.

== See also ==
- Racial hoax
- Filicide
- Dora Luz Buenrostro - committed filicide the same day
