= Red Star Belgrade (band) =

American alternative country band

- Origin: Chapel Hill, North Carolina
- Genres: Alternative country
- Years active: 1994–2000s
- Labels: Put it On a Cracker; Checkered Past Records; Blue Rose Records
- Members: Bill Curry; Graham Harris-Curry; Greg Paul

Red Star Belgrade was an American alternative country band, originally formed in Chapel Hill, North Carolina in 1994 by former music critic Bill Curry. The band's members were Curry, who was its singer and guitarist, his wife Graham Harris-Curry, who played drums, and Greg Paul, who played bass. In 1998, the band relocated from Chapel Hill to Chicago, Illinois. The band was named after the Yugoslavian football club of the same name.

Red Star Belgrade's first release was the controversial 1995 song "Union, S.C.", which was written from the perspective of murderer Susan Smith and featured steel guitar playing by Ed Crawford. In 1996, they released their first studio album, Where the Sun Doesn't Shine. This was followed by their second studio album, The Fractured Hymnal, which was released in 1999; it was their first album released on Checkered Past Records. In May 2000, the band released their third studio album, Telescope, also on Checkered Past Records.

== Discography ==
- Where the Sun Doesn't Shine (Put it On a Cracker, 1996)
- The Fractured Hymnal (Checkered Past, 1999)
- Telescope (Checkered Past, 2000)
- Secrets & Lies (Blue Rose, 2002)
