= Spanic Boys =

American rock band

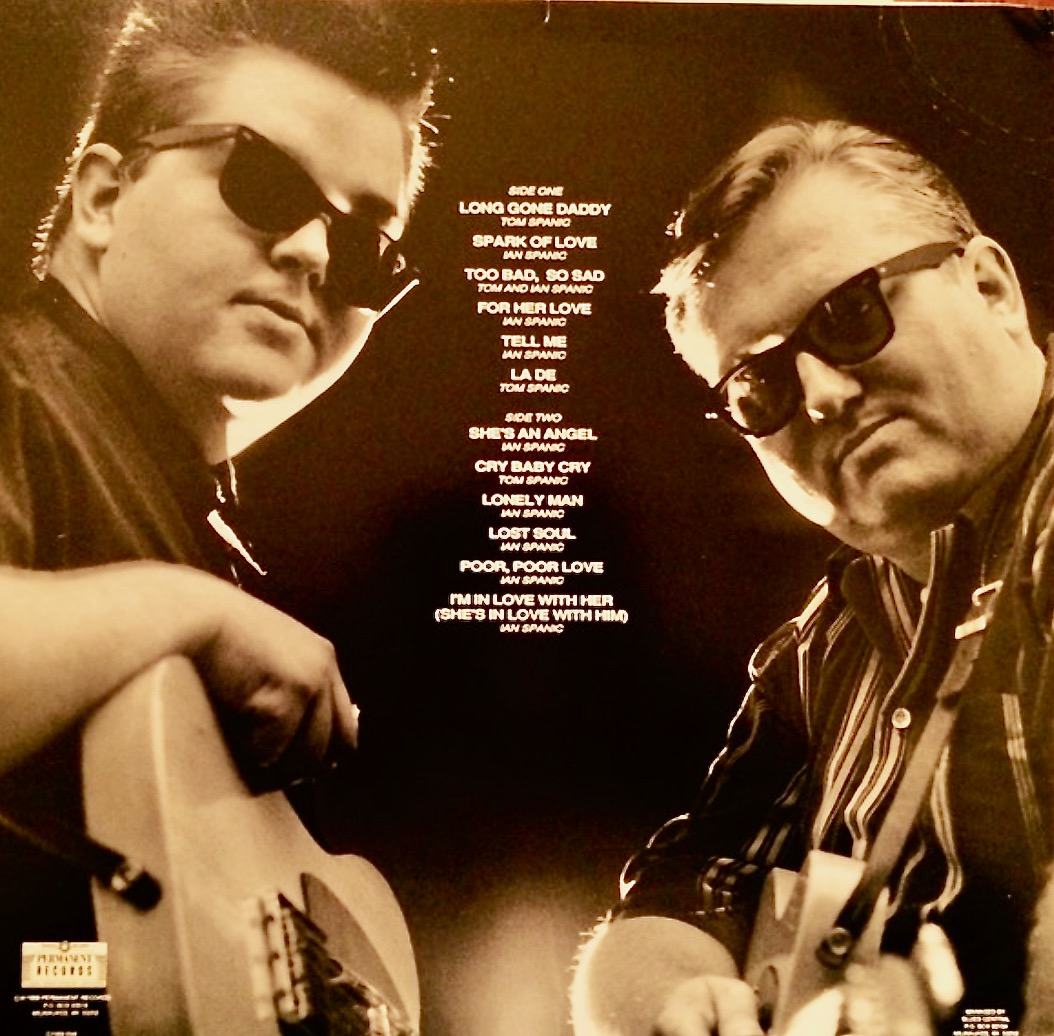

The Spanic Boys are a father-son Americana rock group from Milwaukee. Citing influences as varied as the Everly Brothers, Buddy Holly, the Byrds and the Beatles, the father-son duo of Tom and Ian Spanic first achieved notoriety in 1990 by being substituted at the last minute on Saturday Night Live to replace a boycotting Sinead O'Connor when she learned Andrew Dice Clay was the host. What followed were appearances on numerous other TV and radio programs, including Fresh Air with Terry Gross, Late Night with David Letterman and Late Night with Conan O'Brien as well as both US and European tours. They released 8 albums between 1988 and 2007. Tom Spanic died in 2016.

== History ==
=== 1986-1990 Formation and Early Release ===
Tom and Ian first started playing together in bars around Milwaukee while Ian was still in high school. In 1988 they released their debut self-titled record Spanic Boys on the now defunct Milwaukee-based Permanent Records. Writer Ed Ward from Rolling Stone Magazine had a copy of the record and invited them to South By Southwest (SXSW) in 1989 to do a show. MTV did a feature on the band and several offers followed, and they ended up signing with Rounder Records.

=== 1990-1994 Rounder Records and TV appearances ===
In 1990 Rounder launched the band's first record on that label, Spanic Boys, to much critical attention, recognized for their hard-driving, twin Telecaster sound and impeccable harmony vocals, or in the words of one critic, "country rock sweeter than Almost Home cookies." In May 1990, Sinead O'Connor left Saturday Night Live 2 days before airing due to her concerns about Andrew Dice Clay as the host. SNL bandleader G.E. Smith remembered hearing the band's first record and called Tom up out of the blue to ask them to appear. It was the highest-rated episode of Saturday Night Live at that time.

The band released Strange World on Rounder Records in 1991, receiving positive reviews for their vocal harmonies, twin guitar licks and songwriting, and launching a US tour. They appeared on Late Night with David Letterman on December 13, 1991, performing their song "Strange World," and surprising both Letterman and viewers alike by ripping the strings off their Fender Telecasters at the end of their performance.

In 1992 Rounder reissued the band's out-of-print first album on Permanent Records with the title Early Spanic Boys, which was noted for its "raw and raucous rockabilly," timeless sound and familial harmonies. In reviewing this release, David Wild from Rolling Stone said they were "one of the greatest rock 'n' roll bands in tthe land."

The band released Dream Your Life Away, in 1993, their last record on Rounder, and toured throughout the US to support it. Critics noted the influences of the Byrds and psychadelia on their fourth album, and a move more toward a cutting edge, with some of their best songrwriting to date and lucid production. While touring to support Dream Your Life Away, the band performed their song "Face the Facts" on Late Night with Conan O'Brien in June 1994.

=== Late 1990s - 2000s - Spanic Family Album and subsequent releases ===
The band took a slight detour into a more country sound in 1996, adding steel guitar and the vocals of Tom's cousin Butch Westphal to the mix and tweaking the band's name to the Spanic Family, releasing Spanic Family Album on East Side Digital. Critics appreciated the three-part harmonies, and classic, unpretentious songs. The band continued to tour nationally and in Europe.

In 1998 the band decided to self-release a limited edition signed CD, Walk Through Fire on Panic Button Records.

In 2001 the band released their seventh album, Torture, on Checkered Past Records. Recorded in their own studio, the band worked with Chicago's Brad Elvis and Melanie X on drums and bass, respectively, on this album. Critics noted "tortured yet tuneful songs," highlighted by the band's tight harmonies and aggressive hooks.

The band's eighth album, Sunshine, was self-released in 2007 on Cinaps Records, featuring Brad Elvis on drums and T-Bone Wolk on bass. Critics noted its foundation of roots rock and Americana, wicked guitar licks, and that the band sounds like some 'lost 60s era garage band," but not dated. One of the songs from the record, "Secret," was picked by USA Today's music critic Ken Barnes as one of the 10 intriguing tracks from the present, past and near future.

In 2016, Tom Spanic died peacefully in his home at the age of 69.

== Members ==
Tom Spanic - vocals, guitars

Ian Spanic - vocals, guitars

== Discography ==
=== Albums ===
- Spanic Boys, Permanent Records, 1988
- Spanic Boys, Rounder Records, 1990
- Strange World, Rounder Records, 1991
- Early Spanic Boys, Rounder Records (re-release), 1992
- Dream Your Life Away, Rounder Records, 1993
- Spanic Family Album, East Side Digital, 1996
- Walk Through Fire, Panic Button, 1998
- Torture, Checkered Past Records, 2001
- Sunshine, Cinaps, 2007

=== Singles & EPs ===
- Heartache After Heartache / Lookin' So Fine, Panic Button, 1986

=== Soundtracks ===
- Body Chemistry II: The Voice of a Stranger, 1991
- Where in thte World is Carmen Sandiego, TV series, 1991
- The Marshal, TV series, 1995
- Lewis & Clarke & George, 1997
