= Catamount Records =

Independent record label

Catamount Records is a Nashville, Tennessee-based record label founded in 1999 by Eric Babcock, the former co-founder of Bloodshot Records and Checkered Past Records.

== Notable artists ==
- Johnny Dowd
- Souled American
- Dave Schramm
