= List of 2009 This American Life episodes =

In 2009, there were 25 This American Life episodes.

- Episode 372 – "The Inauguration Show"
- Episode 373 – "The New Boss"
- Episode 374 – "Somewhere Out There"
- Episode 375 – "Bad Bank"
- Episode 376 – "Wrong Side of History"
- Episode 377 – "Scenes From a Recession"
- Episode 378 – "This I Used to Believe"
- Episode 379 – "Return to the Scene of the Crime"
- Episode 380 – "No Map"
- Episode 381 – "Turncoat"

Show description: Stories of people betraying, or perceived as betraying, their own people.
- Act 1: Code Red – Ira Glass and My Thuan Tran (The Los Angeles Times reporter)
  - How San Jose City Councilwoman Madison Nguyen was first celebrated, then red-baited and demonized by the Vietnamese-American community that elected her.
- Act 2 & 3: My Way or the FBI Way – Michael May (reporter)
  - How Brandon Darby, a radical activist against the United States government, became an FBI informant against his former community.
- Music interlude: Jamo Thomas – "I Spy (For the FBI)"
- Act 4: If the Shoe Fits – Matt Malloy
  - Reading of Etgar Keret's short story "Shoes," about a Jewish boy and his love for German-made Adidas shoes.
- Music interlude: Run DMC – "My Adidas"

- Episode 382 – "The Watchmen"

Show description: Stories produced by the Planet Money team, about how the financial regulation and rating agencies, intended to prevent financial disaster, oversaw and permitted the risky activities that led to the 2008 financial crisis.
- Prologue: Ira Glass and Michael Perrino, law professor at St. John's University School of Law, discuss Ferdinand Pecora, lead attorney in the 1930s Senate Banking Committee hearings, who captured public and congressional attention regarding the causes of the Wall Street crash of 1929.
- Act 1: Investigation Report #1 – Chana Joffe-Walt (Planet Money reporter)
  - While various regulatory agencies were responsible for overseeing components of AIG, there was no agency in charge of their most risky activities—or so it was said by some—despite primary Office of Thrift Supervision oversight, which was hampered by other issues.
- Act 2: Investigation Report #2 – Alex Blumberg (NPR correspondent, Planet Money reporter, TAL producer) and David Kestenbaum (Planet Money reporter)
  - The story of how credit rating agencies, Standard and Poors, Moody's and Fitch, gave AAA ratings to the risky financial instruments that led to the 2008 financial crisis.

- Episode 383 – "Origin Story"

Show description: Stories that explain or dispute the origins of institutions, creative work, the law, and people.
- Prologue: Ira Glass, business professor Pino Audia, and Fast Company columnist Dan Heath discuss why so many corporate creation myths involve garages.
- Act 1: Mad Man – Sarah Koenig (TAL producer)
  - The story of the conflict over credit between two advertising legends, Julian Koenig and his former advertising partner George Lois.
- Act 2: The Secret Life of Secrets – Ira Glass (TAL host)
  - How the 1953 U.S. Supreme Court case established the controversial State Secrets Privilege by accepting dubious government claims.
- Music interlude: Nedelle – "Friends and Ancestors"
- Act 3: Wait Wait... Don't Film Me – Ira Glass (TAL host) and Peter Sagal (host of Wait Wait... Don't Tell Me!)
  - How Sagal's original screenplay became a contrived movie sequel.
- Act 4: Bill Clinton’s 7-Year-Old Brother – Mary Wiltenburg (reporter)
  - A Tanzanian boy in America struggles to decide his identity.
- Music interlude: John Lennon – "Dear John"

- Episode 384 – "Fall Guy"
- Episode 385 – "Pro Se"
- Episode 386 – "Fine Print"
- Episode 387 – "Arms Trader 2009"
- Episode 388 – "Rest Stop"
- Episode 389 – "Frenemies"
- Episode 390 – "Return to the Giant Pool of Money"
- Episode 391 – "More Is Less"
- Episode 392 – "Someone Else's Money"
- Episode 393 – "Infidelity"
- Episode 394 – "Bait and Switch"
- Episode 395 – "Middle of the Night"
- Episode 396 – "#1 Party School"
