= Safe House Records =

Defunct New Hampshire-based record label

Safe House Records was an indie rock record label based in West Lebanon, New Hampshire. It was founded by Ken Katkin, who had previously worked at Homestead Records. Its president was James "Jim" Reynolds. They released a series of Led Zeppelin tribute albums entitled The Song Retains the Name, a reference to the Led Zeppelin song "The Song Remains the Same". The first of these albums was released in 1988, and the second in 1993.

== Notable artists ==
- Ass Ponys
- Half Japanese
- The Nails
- Southern Culture on the Skids
- The Vulgar Boatmen
