= Murderball (film) =

2005 documentary film by Henry Alex Rubin and Dana Adam Shapiro

- Theatrical release poster
- Directed by: Henry Alex Rubin; Dana Adam Shapiro
- Produced by: Jeffrey V. Mandel; Dana Adam Shapiro; Jeff Sackman (executive producer)
- Starring: Keith Cavill; Andy Cohn; Scott Hogsett; Christopher Igoe; Mark Zupan; Bob Lujano; Joe Soares; Brent Poppen
- Cinematography: Henry Alex Rubin
- Edited by: Conor O'Neill; Geoffrey Richman
- Music by: Jamie Saft
- Production companies: MTV Films; Paramount Pictures; Participant Productions; A&E IndieFilms
- Distributed by: THINKFilm
- Release dates: July 8, 2005 (Limited); July 22, 2005 (Worldwide)
- Running time: 88 minutes
- Country: United States
- Language: English
- Budget: $350,000
- Box office: $1.8 million

Murderball is a 2005 American documentary film about athletes who are physically disabled who play wheelchair rugby. It centers on the rivalry between the Canadian and American teams leading up to the 2004 Paralympic Games. It was directed by Henry Alex Rubin and Dana Adam Shapiro and produced by Jeffrey V. Mandel and Shapiro. It was nominated for Best Documentary Feature for the 78th Academy Awards. Murderball was the first and only MTV film released through THINKFilm as well as Participant Media.

== Production ==
Murderball was shot on a low budget. The main camera used was a Panasonic AG-DVX100; a Sony PD150 was used to shoot some of the early interviews. The crew rigged a Sennheiser shotgun microphone to use as a boom and relied heavily on lavalier wireless microphones as well. Available lighting was used almost exclusively. Additional light was provided using an inexpensive china ball. In one example of on-the-spot lighting, a flashlight was diffused using only a napkin.

== Reception ==
Murderball garnered almost universally positive reviews. On Rotten Tomatoes, it has an approval rating of 98% based on reviews from 141 critics, and an average rating of 8.37/10. This film also appears on the Rotten Tomatoes countdown of the top sports movies in 14th place as of 2023. Metacritic gives an aggregated score of 87 out of 100, based on 33 critics, indicating "universal acclaim". Murderball also received positive reviews from Hollywood.com and Roger Ebert, who said "This is one of those rare docs, like Hoop Dreams, where life provides a better ending than the filmmakers could have hoped for."

In December 2005, as part of the United Nations' International Day of Persons with Disabilities, the UN Department of Economic and Social Affairs screened the film at the Dag Hammarskjöld Auditorium in its New York City headquarters. The movie was particularly celebrated for examining sexuality after spinal cord injuries.

In April 2024, it was selected by Britain's The Observer newspaper as one of their "20 best sports movies".

== Awards ==
Award	Category	Recipient	Result
Sundance Film Festival Audience Award	Best Documentary Feature		Won
78th Academy Awards	Best Documentary Feature		Nominated
Full Frame Documentary Film Festival Audience Award	Best Feature		Won
Indianapolis International Film Festival Audience Award	Best Feature Film		Won
Indianapolis International Film Festival Audience Award	Best Non-Fiction Film		Won

== Musical score and soundtrack ==
Music from the Film Murderball

Soundtrack album by Various artists
- Released: June 28, 2005
- Genre: Film score
- Length: 48:39
- Labels: Commotion; CR011
- Producers: Dana Adam Shapiro, Tracy McKnight, Jeff Mandel, Walter Yetnikoff

Jamie Saft chronology
Astaroth: Book of Angels Volume 1 (2005)	Music from the Film Murderball (2005)	Trouble: The Jamie Saft Trio Plays Bob Dylan (2006)

The film score was composed and performed by Jamie Saft and the soundtrack album, which featured selections from Saft's score along with previously released tracks by Ministry, Ween, The Polyphonic Spree, Sam Prekop, The Moldy Peaches, The Whiles, Chessie and Scratch Massive used in the documentary, was released on the Commotion label in 2005. Additional music composed for the film was released on Saft's A Bag of Shells (Tzadik, 2010).

Professional ratings
Review scores
Source	Rating
Allmusic	3.5/5 stars

Allmusic's James Christopher Monger said "Hearing Ministry's Alaine Jourgensen screaming "thieves, thieves & liars, murderers" over the clash of metal on metal during a wheelchair rugby match dutifully amplifies the primal nature of competition, especially when all of the players involved have overcome near-death physical (and psychological) injuries. ... The film's producers have compiled a rousing soundtrack that reflects the sport's brutality while maintaining an undercurrent of regretful stoicism. Keyboard player/composer Jamie Saft provides Murderball's backbone, laying down an original score that boasts atmospherics which are both tender and visceral. Other highlights include the engaging "Something" from the Sea and Cake's Sam Prekop, a trippy instrumental from Ween and the Moldy Peaches "Anyone Else But You."".

Track listing

All compositions by Jamie Saft except where noted

1. Ministry: "Thieves" (Paul Barker, Al Jourgensen) – 4:59
2. Jamie Saft: "Murderball Remix" – 4:44
3. Ween: "The F**ked Jam" (Aaron Freeman, Michael Melchiondo) – 2:55
4. The Polyphonic Spree: "Light & Day" (Tim DeLaughter) – 3:24
5. Sam Prekop: "Something" (Sam Prekop) – 3:47
6. Jamie Saft: "Robert's Theme" – 2:27
7. The Moldy Peaches: "Anyone Else but You" (Kimya Dawson) – 2:57
8. The Whiles: "Song for Jerry" (The Whiles) – 1:31
9. Chessie: "Follow Me Home" (Chessie) – 6:51
10. Jamie Saft: "Penultimatum" – 3:21
11. Scratch Massive: "Keep on Workin'" (Sebastien Chenut, Maud Geffray) – 5:12
12. Jamie Saft: "Dungeonous Warfare" – 1:27
13. Ministry: "Waiting" (Jourgensen, Mike Scaccia, Max Brody) – 5:04
