= John Curley (professor) =

Member of the Pennsylvania State University faculty

- Born: December 31, 1938 (age 87); Easton, Pennsylvania, U.S.
- Education: Dickinson College; Columbia University
- Occupation: Professor
- Employer: Pennsylvania State University
- Known for: President, CEO, and chairman of Gannett
- Spouse
- Children
- Relatives: Tom Curley (brother), John Curley (son)
- Website: Penn State College of Communications

John Curley is a professor, distinguished professional in residence, and co-director of the Center for Sports Journalism at Pennsylvania State University. Under his leadership as head of Gannett, the news service won the Pulitzer Prize for Public Service and served as the first editor of USA Today. Curley also was a member of Gannett's board of directors from 1983 until his retirement.

== Early life and education ==
Curley was born December 31, 1938, in Easton, Pennsylvania. He attended Easton Area High School in Easton, where he graduated in 1956. He then attended Dickinson College in Carlisle, Pennsylvania, where he graduated Omicron Delta Kappa in 1960. Curley was a member of Phi Kappa Sigma fraternity at Dickinson. He earned a Master's Degree from Columbia University in 1963.

Curley's younger brother Tom Curley served as president and chief executive officer of the Associated Press until his 2012 retirement.

== Career ==
Curley served as an editor at the Rochester Times-Union in Rochester, New York, editor and later publisher of the Courier News in Bridgewater, New Jersey, and publisher of The News-Journal in Wilmington, Delaware.

In May 1996, he was selected as chairman of the Newspaper Association of America. In 1999, he was made an honorary alumnus of Penn State.

Curley retired from Gannett as chairman in January 2001 after more than 30 years with the company.

The John Curley Center for Sports Journalism at Penn State is named in his honor.

In 2005, he received the Lifetime Achievement Award from the Pennsylvania Newspaper Association for outstanding service and accomplishments spanning his career in journalism.
