= Bait and Switch (album) =

Studio album by Thomas Jefferson Slave Apartments
- Released: July 11, 1995
- Studio: Magnetic Planet Studio (Columbus)
- Genre: Indie rock, punk rock
- Length: 37:00
- Label: Onion; American
- Producer: Michael "Rep" Hummel

Thomas Jefferson Slave Apartments chronology
| Bait and Switch (1995) | Straight to Video (1997) |

Bait and Switch is the debut album by Columbus, Ohio-based rock band Thomas Jefferson Slave Apartments. It was released on July 11, 1995, through Onion Records, a sub-label of American Recordings. It was recorded at a cost of $800.

== Critical reception ==
Professional ratings
Review scores
| Source | Rating |
|---|---|
| AllMusic | 4/5 stars |
| Chicago Tribune | 3/4 stars |
| Christgau's Consumer Guide | A– |
| Entertainment Weekly | B+ |
| Spin | 7/10 |

In a contemporary review for the Chicago Tribune, Greg Kot gave Bait and Switch 3 out of 4 stars, writing, "Nothing new here, just a clangorous, nasty good time courtesy of some saw-toothed riffs and a supremely estranged wit." Deborah Sprague wrote in Trouser Press that the album's highlight was "...the revolutionary screed "RnR Hall of Fame," which tosses verbal firebombs at the very concept of the Cleveland rock hall, advocating that someone "blow it up...before Paul Westerberg gets in." Robert Christgau gave the album an A− grade and wrote that on it, the band's frontman Ron House demonstrates "that punk and youth need have nothing to do with each other anymore." Entertainment Weekly's Ethan Smith gave the album a B+ grade, calling it "short on polish, long on charm." In a 2009 retrospective review, Magnet called the album "razor-sharp-yet-unrefined" and "an incendiary near-masterpiece".

== Track listing ==
1. My Mysterious Death (Turn It Up) – 4:00
2. Is She Shy – 2:43
3. Down to High Street – 3:42
4. Quarrel with the World – 3:11
5. Cheater's Heaven – 3:47
6. Cyclotron – 2:05
7. Negative Guest List – 2:41
8. Fire in the Swimming Girl – 3:47
9. You Can't Kill Stupid – 2:53
10. RnR Hall of Fame – 1:06
11. Contract Dispute – 4:32
12. Wrongheaded – 2:32

== Personnel ==
Personnel per liner notes.

Thomas Jefferson Slave Apartments

- Ron House – lead vocals
- Bob Petric – guitar, backing vocals
- Craig Dunson – bass
- Ted Hattemer – brums

Additional personnel

- Keith Baker – composer
- John Morton – composer

Production

- Michael "Rep" Hummel – production, mixing
- Craig Dunson – Engineer, mixing
- Steve Evans – Engineer
