= Wussy =

American indie rock band

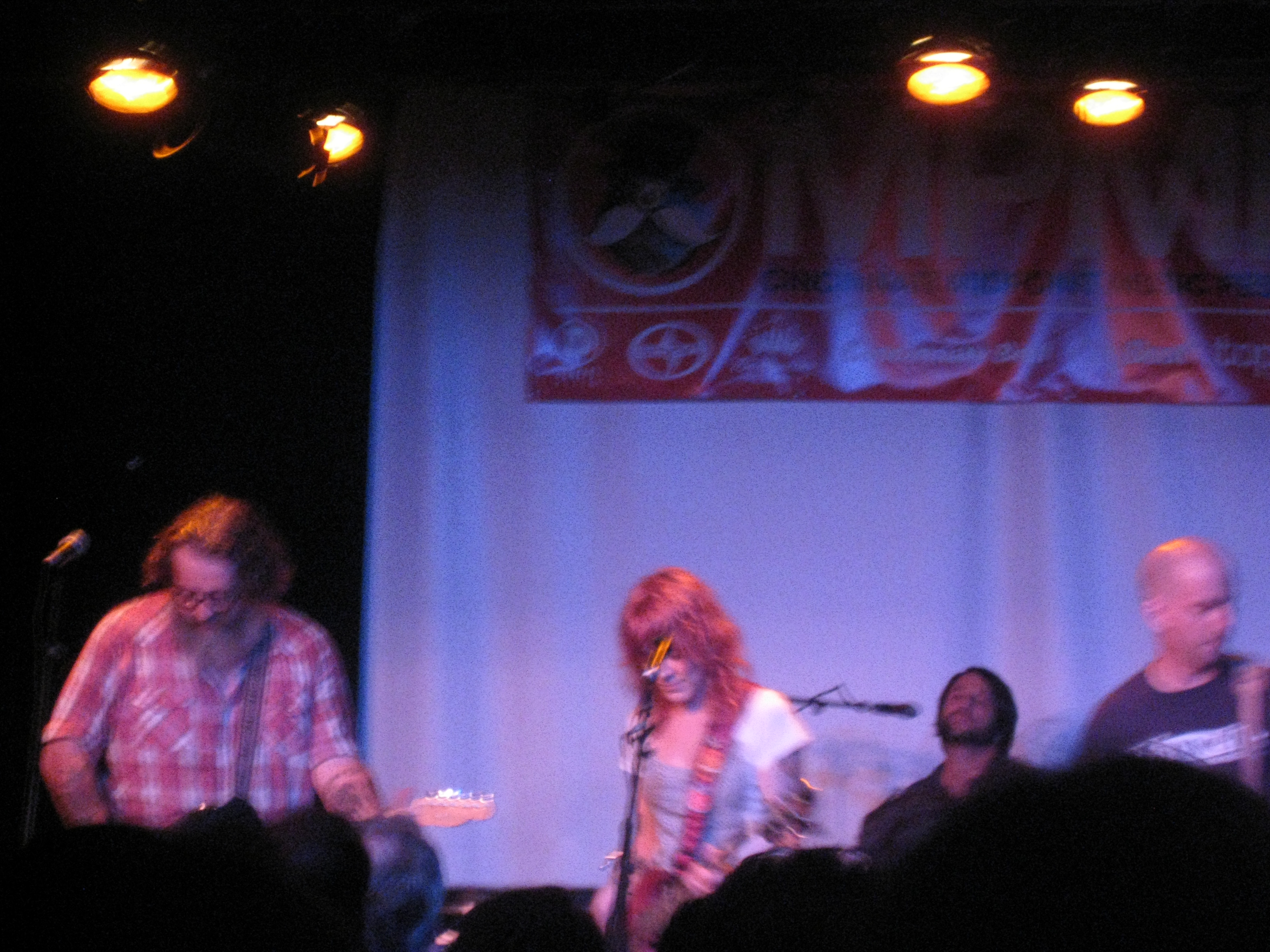
- Cleaver, Walker, Klug, Messerly (left to right)

Background information
- Origin: Cincinnati, Ohio, United States
- Genres: Indie rock; folk rock; alternative rock; country rock
- Years active: 2001–present
- Label: Shake It Records Damnably
- Members: Chuck Cleaver, guitars & vocals Lisa Walker, guitars & vocals Mark Messerly, bass Joe Klug, drums Travis Talbert, pedal steel
- Past members: Dawn Burman, drums John Erhardt, pedal steel
- Website: wussyworld.com

Wussy is an American four-piece indie rock band formed in Cincinnati, Ohio in 2001. The band consists of Chuck Cleaver (vocals/guitar), Lisa Walker (vocals/guitar), Joe Klug (drums) and Mark Messerly (bass). Former members include Dawn Burman (drums) and John Erhardt (pedal steel). Cleaver and Walker write most of the songs and either alternate lead vocals or sing them in harmony. Live performances feature the two vocalists having a "combative rapport". The band has released seven albums, one live album, two EPs, one mini LP and a number of singles. The group has received critical acclaim from Rolling Stone, Robert Christgau, Chicago, and SPIN.

== History ==
Wussy formed in Cincinnati, Ohio, in 2001 while Chuck Cleaver had just released the last album with his previous group, Ass Ponys. He met Lisa Walker and asked her to perform with him at a local awards show in Cincinnati in 2001. Following the performance the duo decided to form a band together. Walker, originally from Muncie, Indiana, attended Cedarville University and has worked in marketing. They were joined by Messerly on bass and Dawn Burman on drums in 2002. Burman had not yet mastered the instrument but joined as she "loved their sound and wanted to be part of it". Cleaver finalised his previous band with a compilation in 2005 leaving him to concentrate on Wussy. They made their recording debut in 2005 with the album Funeral Dress on Shake it Records, the label of a local record store of the same name. The record was produced by John Curley at his Ultrasuede Studios, where the band would continue to record future albums. While making the album all four band members suffered some personal hardship that inspired much of the 2007 record Left for Dead. Contrary to other releases it relied heavily on Walker's writing, and was described by Spin as doing "relationship songs right". It was followed by a self-titled album in 2009. The same year drummer Burman left and was replaced by Joe Klug. In late 2010, the band recorded an acoustic version of their debut as Funeral Dress II live at Ultrasuede that was released for Record Store Day 2011.

Wussy performing at MidPoint Music Festival in Cincinnati, Ohio, in 2013

The album Strawberry was released in November 2011 and was described as "driven by an unpretentious, rust-flecked honesty and a warped worldview". Former Ass Ponys member John Erhardt joined the band before recording started. The band embarked on a three-week headlining tour in support of the album. In 2012 they released the Europe-only seventeen track compilation Buckeye on Damnably Records, their first international release.

In 2014 they released the album Attica!, the title inspired by the film Dog Day Afternoon, while the single and The Who tribute "Teenage Wasteland", received some airplay. The album was released in the UK through Damnably Records.

In March 2016 the band released their seventh album, Forever Sounds, which reached number 20 on the Billboard Heatseeker album chart.

The band's eighth album, What Heaven is Like, was released in May 2018.

At the beginning of the band Cleaver and Walker were a couple but they separated in 2007. On the band's name, Wussy: Cleaver joked that "I think it looks good on a t-shirt."

Pedal steel guitarist John Erhardt died on May 4, 2020. For several years following Erhardt's death, Cleaver and Walker performed as Wussy duo. They played their first full band show with new member Travis Talbert on April 29th, 2024, opening for Guided By Voices at Madison Theater in Covington, Kentucky.

The band's ninth album, Cincinnati Ohio, was released in November 2024.

== Critical acclaim ==
The band is a favorite with some rock critics. In 2012 Robert Christgau wrote that "Wussy have been the best since they released the first of their five superb albums in 2005", and he has called them his "favorite band". Two albums later, Charles Taylor said the impact of Wussy's poetic lyrics and evocative sounds "brings you immediately back to the way we received rock and roll as solitary adolescents, as if the songs were radio transmissions from a resistance we hadn't dared to hope existed."

== Members ==
- Chuck Cleaver – Vocals, Guitar
- Lisa Walker – Vocals, Guitar
- Mark Messerly – Bass, Keys
- Joe Klug – Drums
- Travis Talbert – Pedal Steel

=== Former members ===
- John Erhardt – Pedal Steel, Guitar (died May 2020)
- Dawn Burman – Drums

== Discography ==
=== Albums ===
- 2005: Funeral Dress (Shake It)
- 2007: Left for Dead (Shake It)
- 2009: Wussy (Shake It)
- 2011: Strawberry (Shake It)
- 2014: Attica! (Shake It/Damnably)
- 2016: Forever Sounds (Shake It/Damnably)
- 2018: What Heaven is Like (Shake It/Damnably)
- 2024: Cincinnati Ohio (Album) (Shake it)

=== EPs ===
- 2008: Rigor Mortis EP (Shake It)
- 2013: Duo mini-LP (Shake It)
- 2015: Public Domain, Volume I (Shake It)
- 2018: Getting Better (Damnably)

=== Singles and splits ===
- 2009: "Fly Fly Fly" / "No Apology" – Wussy / The Fervor (Karate Body)
- 2012: Dangerous Highway Volume 3: "Got Down Last Saturday Night" / "Breakfast in Bed" - Heartless Bastards / Wussy (Shake It)
- 2016: "Dropping Houses" b/w "Folk Night at Fucky's" (Shake It / Damnably)
- 2016: "Ceremony" b/w "Days and Hours" (Damnably)

=== Compilations ===
- 2011: Funeral Dress II (Shake It, live acoustic)
- 2012: Buckeye (Damnably)
- 2013: Berneice Huff and Son, Bill Sings… Popular Favorites (digital only, self-released)
- 2020: Ghosts (digital only, self-released)
