= Checkered Past Records =

American record label

Checkered Past Records is an American indie music record label established in May 1997 in Chicago.

== History ==
The label was founded in May 1997 by Bloodshot Records co-founder Eric Babcock, Yvonne Jones, and Larry Lipson. Babcock met Jones through their shared love of the Texas-based band Killbilly, and ran Checkered Past out of Jones' and her husband's house in Irving Park. Babcock's stated motivation for starting the label stemmed in part from his desire to release "more traditional and rootsy-sounding" music by relatively little-known artists. It was also influenced by Bloodshot's refusal to release "The Neighborhood is Changing", the debut album by Tom House. He has also recalled that while he was working at Bloodshot, he was looking through dozens of albums by such artists, and was surprised that they hadn't been released locally yet. So he decided to start his own label to do so himself, starting with Tom House's album The Neighborhood Is Changing. In 1999, Babcock founded the Nashville-based Catamount Records, and, as of 2004, had since left Checkered Past to run it.

== Artists ==
Artists which have released albums on Checkered Past include, but are not limited to:

- Ass Ponys
- The Great Crusades
- Johnny Dowd
- Lonesome Bob
- Paul Burch
- Red Star Belgrade
- The Silos
- Souled American
- Spanic Boys
- Tom House
- Tommy Womack
