= Ass Ponys =

American indie rock band

- Origin: Cincinnati, Ohio, USA
- Genres: Alternative country, country rock
- Years active: 1988–2005, 2015
- Labels: A&M; Checkered Past Records; Okra; Safe House; Shake It
- Members: Chuck Cleaver; Randy Cheek; Dave Morrison
- Past members: Bill Alletzhauser; Dan Kleingers; John Erhardt

Ass Ponys was an indie rock band based in Cincinnati, Ohio. Their sound combines rock and country into an off-kilter blend of Americana music. They have gone on national tours with bands such as Pavement, Throwing Muses, and Possum Dixon. Among other periodicals, they have been featured in Rolling Stone, CMJ, and The Cincinnati Post.

== History ==
The Ass Ponys was formed in 1988 from members of Ohio band the Libertines and Midwestern band Gomez. The group was active for 17 years, releasing six studio albums from 1988 to 2005. The Ass Ponys went on hiatus in 2005, after releasing the compilation album The Okra Years – four years after their last original material was released in Lohio. More importantly, it appears that core band members are focused on new projects, so new Ass Ponys output seems unlikely any time soon. Vocalist Chuck Cleaver is focusing his attention on his current band, Wussy. Bill Alletzhauser currently fronts the band The Hiders. Randy Cheek plays with The Libertines US, The Fairmount Girls, and The Ready Stance. Chuck Cleaver and Randy Cheek performed together at TedxCincinnati in November 2013. In July 2015, the band announced they would play two shows at the Woodward Theater in Cincinnati on Friday, November 6, and Saturday, November 7, 2015. The reunion shows featured the bands Swim Team and Vacation as openers for the Ass Ponys.

== Members ==
- Chuck Cleaver – vocals, guitar (1988–2005)
- Randy Cheek – bass, backing vocals (1988–2005; died 2024)
- John Erhardt – guitar (1988–1994; 2003–2005; died 2020)
- Kevin Lung – guitar (1994)
- Bill Alletzhauser – guitar, slide, banjo, backing vocals (1995–2002)
- Dan Kleingers – drums (1988–1991)
- Dave Morrison – drums, keyboards, backing vocals (1991–2005)

== Discography ==
=== Studio albums ===
- 1990 – Mr. Superlove (Okra)
- 1993 – Grim (Okra/Safe House)
- 1994 – Electric Rock Music (A&M)
- 1996 – The Known Universe (A&M)
- 2000 – Some Stupid with a Flare Gun (Checkered Past)
- 2001 – Lohio (Checkered Past)

=== Extended plays ===
- 1994 – Little Bastard (A&M)
- 1996 – Under Cedars and Stars (A&M)

=== Compilations ===
- 2006 – The Okra Years (Shake It)

=== Singles ===
- Little Bastard, from Electric Rock Music (#26 on US Billboard Modern Rock)
