= Thomas Jefferson Slave Apartments =

Rock band from Columbus, Ohio

- Thomas Jefferson Slave Apartments in 1995

Background information
- Origin: Columbus, Ohio
- Genres: Lo-fi music
- Years active: 1989–2000
- Labels: Datapanik; Onion; American; Anyway; Rockathon
- Past members: Ron House; Bob Petric; Craig Dunson; Ted Hattemer

Thomas Jefferson Slave Apartments was a band from Columbus, Ohio active from 1989 to 2000.

== History ==
The band was formed in 1989 by Ron House, the former frontman of the band Great Plains. The band is named after Thomas Jefferson's slave quarters at Monticello. Soon after their formation, they released several 7"s in the Columbus area. They followed these up with their debut album, Bait and Switch, which they recorded at a cost of $800, and which was released in 1995 on American Recordings imprint Onion Records. This album was followed by their second album, Straight to Video, which was released in 1997 on Anyway Records following Onion's closure. Also in 1997, the band released a compilation album, You Lookin' for Treble, which contained singles the band had released from 1990 to 1992, as well as songs from an EP released during that time. Their third and last studio album, "No Old Guy Lo-Fi Cry", was released in 2000 on Rockathon Records, a label owned by Guided by Voices frontman Robert Pollard.

While the band ended its initial run in 2000, they would continue to perform live in their native Ohio sporadically throughout the 2000s and 2010s.

Guitarist Bob Petric died in April 2021.

== Critical reception ==
Bait and Switch received a favorable review from Entertainment Weekly's Ethan Smith, who wrote that the album was "short on polish, long on charm" and gave it a B+ rating. Greg Kot also reviewed the album favorably, writing that there is "Nothing new here, just a clangorous, nasty good time courtesy of some saw-toothed riffs and a supremely estranged wit." Robert Christgau gave Bait and Switch an A− rating, writing that the first five songs on the album "rush by in a perfect furious tunefest". Another review of this album appeared in Spin, in which Eric Weisbard wrote that "House was right to reground his art, putting the way music flows and falls before singer-songwriterly commentary." He also said that on the album, House begins the process of doing something with noise, but that he does not go far enough. In Billboard, David Sprague wrote that Bait and Switch "retain[s] the relaxed, lo-fi vibe" that was apparent on the band's early singles.

== Discography ==
=== Studio albums ===
- Bait and Switch (American Recordings, 1995)
- Straight to Video (Anyway, 1997)
- No Old Guy Lo-Fi Cry (Rockathon, 2000)

=== Compilation albums ===
- You Lookin' for Treble? (Year Zero/Vinyl Retentive, 1997)
