= Great Plains (Ohio band) =

- Origin: Columbus, Ohio
- Genres: Folk pop, new wave, garage rock
- Years active: 1981–1989
- Labels: Homestead Records, Old 3C Records
- Past members: Ron House (vocals/guitar/songwriting), Matt Wyatt (guitar), Mark Wyatt (keyboards), Paul Nini (bass) David Green (drums)

Great Plains was a band from Columbus, Ohio active during the 1980s. Its vocalist and songwriter, Ron House, went on to found the much more successful band Thomas Jefferson Slave Apartments.

== History ==
Great Plains was founded in 1981. Its first release was 1982's The Mark, Don & Mel EP, which contained eight tracks. In 1984, they released their full-length debut, Born in a Barn, on Homestead Records. They released another full-length, Naked At The Buy Sell & Trade, in 1986, followed by their third such album, Sum Things Up, in 1987. In 1989, the band released a compilation album, Colorized!, on the Demon Records offshoot Diabolo Records. In 2000, a compilation album of 50 of the band's songs from their entire career, entitled Length of Growth, 1981-1989, was released on the Old 3C label.

== Reception ==
Robert Christgau awarded two of Great Plains' studio albums B+ grades, and the other (Sum Things Up) an A−. Len Righi described Sum Things Up as "an oddball combination of punk, pop, psychedelia, folk and garage rock" and said that the band's records had improved consistently in quality over their history.

== Discography ==
=== Studio albums ===
- Born in a Barn (Homestead) 1984
- Naked at the Buy, Sell and Trade (Homestead) 1985
- Sum Things Up (Homestead) 1987

=== EPs ===
- The Mark, Don & Mel E.P. (New Age) 1983

=== Compilation albums ===
- Colorized! (Diabolo, 1989)
- Length of Growth 1981-89 (Old 3C) 2001
