= Columbus Alive =

Online newspaper in Columbus, Ohio

- Example cover of aLIVE
- Owner: Gannett
- Publisher: Ray Paprocki
- Language: English
- Headquarters: Columbus, Ohio
- Sister newspapers: The Columbus Dispatch
- Website: www.columbusalive.com

Columbus Alive (also presented as ALIVE), was a free online news site serving Columbus, Ohio. The site focused on local music, art, dining, film and culture. Formerly distributed in print form each week on Thursdays, the final print version of the alternative-weekly newspaper was published on July 3, 2019. The publication was acquired by The Columbus Dispatch in the first half of 2006 and the circulation at that time was approximately 55,000. In 2015, the Dispatch was acquired by New Media Investment Group, which later became Gannett. Circulation had fallen to 32,000 copies by 2019, which according to editor Andy Downing made the newspaper "no longer sustainable" in print form. On May 31, 2022, it was announced that the final edition would be published on June 3, 2022.

Before the paper was sold, the publisher was Sally Crane (of the Crane Plastics family). In the early 2000s, while still operated by Crane, the paper had significant gay and lesbian, environmental, and political reporting and commentary, including the columns of Harvey Wasserman and Bob Fitrakis.
