= John Curley (musician) =

American bass guitarist

- Born: March 15, 1965 (age 61); Trenton, New Jersey
- Origin: Cincinnati, Ohio
- Genre: Alternative rock
- Instrument: Bass guitar
- Years active: 1986–present
- Label: Elektra
- Member of: The Afghan Whigs

John Curley Jr. (born March 14, 1965, in Trenton, New Jersey) is an American musician best known as the bassist for, and co-founder of, the Afghan Whigs. When he co-founded the Afghan Whigs, Curley was working as a staff photographer for the Cincinnati Enquirer. He also produced or engineered the Ass Ponys' first four albums, all of which were recorded at his recording studio, Ultrasuede Studios. Ultrasuede Studios is located in the Cincinnati neighborhood of Camp Washington. As of 2016, Curley still works at Ultrasuede.

== Personal life ==
Curley and his wife, Michelle, have two children. His father, John Curley, is the former CEO of Gannett Company.
