= Shake It Records =

American record label and store

Shake It Records (often stylized Shake It! Records) is a record label and record store in the Northside neighborhood of Cincinnati, Ohio. It is co-owned by brothers Jim and Darren Blase. As of 2010, their record store had almost 20,000 CDs and 50,000 vinyl records for sale.

== History ==
Shake It Records was founded in 1979 by Jess Hirbe and Daryl "Doc" Kalmus, to release albums by Cincinnati-area bands like the Customs. In the early 1990s, Darren Blase called Hirbe, who had by then sold the record store, to ask if he could revive the label. Hirbe said yes, and in 1992, Blase acquired the label in return for a copy of the Jack Dupree album Blues from the Gutter. By 1999, the label had become the most active one dedicated to punk rock and roots rock in Cincinnati. In 1999, Blase re-opened the Shake It record store. Jim and Darren Blase opened up their current location on 4156 Hamilton Ave on September 11, 2001.

== Compilations ==
In 2009, Shake It released the Eddie Hinton tribute album Dangerous Highway: A Tribute To The Songs Of Eddie Hinton, which features covers of Hinton's songs by artists such as Dan Auerbach and Greg Dulli. The label has also released multiple compilations of soul songs by Cincinnati-area artists.

== Artists ==
Notable artists who have released one or more albums on Shake It include:

- Wussy, who had released all of their albums through the label as of 2016
- Glue, a collaborative hip hop project between Adeem, Maker, and djdq of the Animal Crackers
- The Cowslingers, a punkabilly band
