= Chuck Cleaver =

American singer-songwriter

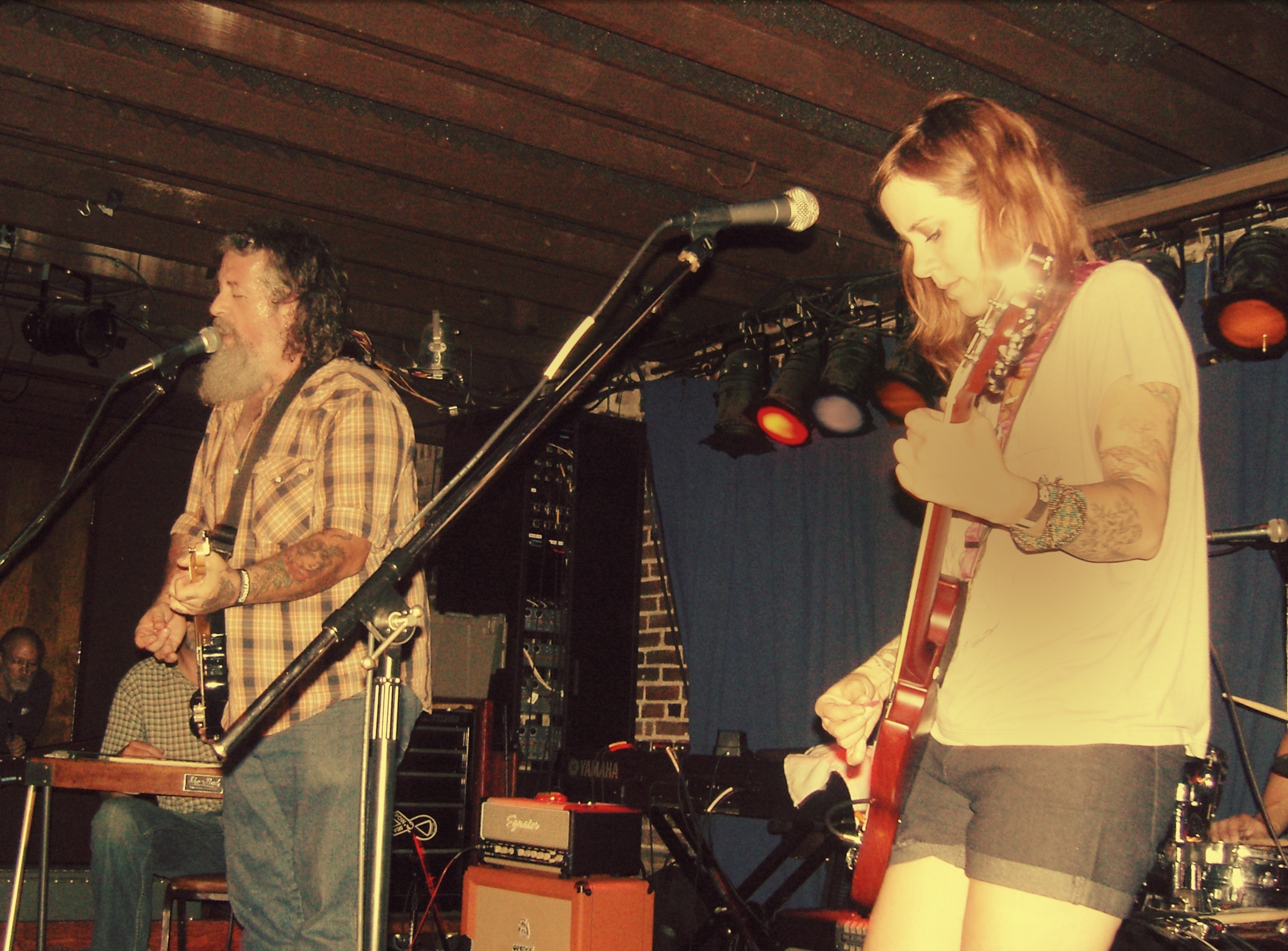
- Cleaver (left) and Lisa Walker performing as Wussy, March 18, 2006.

Background information
- Born: Charles James Cleaver; June 6, 1959 (age 66)
- Origin: Clarksville, Ohio, U.S.
- Genres: Indie rock
- Occupations: Guitarist, singer-songwriter
- Instruments: Guitar, vocals
- Years active: 1990–present

Charles James Cleaver is an American songwriter, singer and guitarist, best known as a member of the Cincinnati-based bands Ass Ponys (formed in 1988, went on hiatus in 2005) and Wussy (formed in 2001).

== Biography ==
Cleaver grew up in Clarksville, Ohio, the son of a factory worker who had very eclectic musical tastes ranging from Manu Dibango to Dave and Ansell Collins. He enrolled in the University of Cincinnati in the late 1970s. In addition to his musical career, Cleaver worked as a stonemason, though he stopped after his chiropractor advised against it. He and Wussy bandmate Lisa Walker both used to be record traders before their musical careers began.

== Musical career ==
Cleaver started Ass Ponys in 1988, and they released their first album two years later. During this time, he lived in Bethel. With regard to why Ass Ponys broke up, Cleaver says, "I just kind of felt that Ass Ponys had run its course," and "We were coming up with new material, but I just really wasn’t all that interested in it anymore." After he met Lisa Walker in 2001, around the time Ass Ponys released their last album of original material, Lohio, they decided to form a band, which Cleaver decided to call "Wussy" because "I just like the way it looks on a T-shirt. It's another one of my names ensured not to get anywhere." In an interview with the Portland Mercury, Cleaver said that he originally enlisted Walker to sing with him when he was asked to perform solo for a Cincinnati awards show. He has been called one of the best singer-songwriters in America by Freedy Johnston.

== Musical influences and style ==
Cleaver has stated that he prefers music that has "something a little messed up with it," and gives Sparklehorse and Tom Waits as examples of his favorite artists. Music critics have described Cleaver's vocal style as an "anxious" and "corkscrew falsetto," and "a strained, inebriated falsetto that could have easily originated from the mouth of a townie who's witnessed weird stuff for years." Additionally, Neil Strauss has described Cleaver's vocal style as "a cracking, tuneful drawl somewhere between that of Michael Stipe of R.E.M. and Wayne Coyne of the Flaming Lips."
