= Random Desire =

2020 studio album by Greg Dulli

Studio album by Greg Dulli
- Released: February 21, 2020
- Recorded: 2017–2019
- Studio: Fireside Sound (Silver Lake); Donner & Blitzen Studios (Silver Lake); Gold-Diggers Sound (Los Angeles); Mant (Los Angeles); Marigny Recording Studio (New Orleans)
- Genre: Alternative rock
- Length: 36:50
- Label: Royal Cream; BMG
- Producer: Greg Dulli; Christopher Thorn

Greg Dulli chronology
Live at Triple Door (2008)	Random Desire (2020)

Singles from Random Desire
- 1. "Pantomima" Released: December 4, 2019; 2. "It Falls Apart" Released: January 30, 2020; 3. "A Ghost" Released: February 18, 2020

Random Desire is the debut studio album by American singer Greg Dulli, lead singer of the bands the Afghan Whigs and the Twilight Singers. It was released on February 21, 2020, by Royal Cream and BMG Rights Management.

== Background ==
Dulli's band the Afghan Whigs had reformed in 2012 for a reunion tour, and released two albums, Do to the Beast (2014) and In Spades (2017). In the past, Dulli had released solo material away from the Afghan Whigs and his other musical acts, the Twilight Singers and the Gutter Twins. In 2005, Dulli released Amber Headlights, an album compiling solo sessions written in 2001, and a live album released in 2008 featuring content he had recorded at The Triple Door in Seattle for the A Drink for the Kids fundraising effort by The Vera Project. Since 2009, Dulli had released solo cover tracks, such as covers of the Eddie Hinton tracks "Hard Luck Guy" and "Cover Me" in 2009, and covers of Leonard Cohen, Sharon Van Etten and David Bowie.

== Writing and recording ==
After the release of the Afghan Whigs' eighth studio album In Spades and the death of Afghan Whigs' guitarist Dave Rosser in 2017, Dulli began to work on Random Desire. The album became a solo project when Dulli realized that many of his Afghan Whigs bandmates would be unavailable in the upcoming months: drummer Patrick Keeler would be on tour with his band The Raconteurs, and bassist John Curley had decided to go back to college. After a burst of inspiration in February 2019, the album was primarily written and recorded between then and July 2019, at sessions in Joshua Tree National Park, Dulli's home in Los Angeles and New Orleans.

The album, took influence from Prince and Todd Rundgren's methods of writing and performing almost every instrument on their records. Dulli wrote and arranged the album entirely by himself along with playing the bulk of the instruments, but brought in supporting musicians to add accents to the songs. These musicians included Queens of the Stone Age drummer Jon Theodore, singer Camille, and Afghan Whigs/Twilight Singers band members Rick Nelson, Jon Skibic, Mark McGuire and Mathias Schneeberger.

== Promotion ==
The album was announced on December 4, 2019, the same day that the leading single "Pantomima" was released to streaming services. The songs "It Falls Apart" and "A Ghost" were released in the month leading up to the album's release. The final promotional single for the album was "Lockless" which was released on December 1, 2020. It was accompanied by a video directed by Bailey Smith featuring footage of New Orleans during the first COVID-19 lockdown in March 2020. Dulli stated that "the song itself suggests a loneliness and I felt the marriage between the song and these images [of a deserted New Orleans] was too perfect not to explore".

=== Tour ===
Dulli originally planned an international tour held from March to May 2020 performing with Afghan Whigs members Jon Skibic and Rick Nelson; however, due to the effects of the COVID-19 pandemic this tour was postponed. On August 1, Dulli held two pay-per-view livestream events streamed from Gold-Diggers Sound in Hollywood: one solo performance, and one joined by his general practitioner and contrabass/pedal steel guitar player Steven Patt.

== Critical reception ==
Professional ratings
Aggregate scores
Source	Rating
AnyDecentMusic?	7.1/10
Metacritic	76/100
Review scores
Source	Rating
AllMusic	4/5 stars
American Songwriter	3.5/5 stars
Classic Rock	4/5 stars
Kerrang!	3/5 stars
Pitchfork	7.3/10 stars
PopMatters	8/10 stars
Rolling Stone	3.5/5 stars

At Metacritic, which assigns a normalized rating out of 100 to reviews from mainstream critics, Random Desire has an average score of 76 based on 11 reviews, indicating "generally favorable reviews". Album of the Year collected 13 reviews and calculated an average of 75 out of 100. Aggregator AnyDecentMusic? gave the album 7.1 out of 10, based on their assessment of the critical consensus.

== Track listing ==
All tracks are written by Greg Dulli.

No.	Title	Length
1.	"Pantomima"	3:25
2.	"Sempre"	3:33
3.	"Marry Me"	4:00
4.	"The Tide"	4:37
5.	"Scorpio"	3:19
6.	"It Falls Apart"	4:23
7.	"A Ghost"	2:42
8.	"Lockless"	3:50
9.	"Black Moon"	3:29
10.	"Slow Pan"	3:32
Total length:		36:50

== Personnel ==
Credits adapted from the liner notes of Random Desire.

- Bryan Brown – percussion (2), castanets (7), bells (7), vibraphone (7)
- Camille – vocals (5)
- Charles Copley – guitar (6)
- Greg Dulli – production, vocals (1–10), bass (1, 5, 9), guitar (1–4, 6–9), drums (1, 4–5, 7–8), mellotron (1, 5–9), piano (2, 4–6, 10), percussion (2), organ (3, 10), vibraphone (3)
- Scott Frock – trumpet (8)
- Avtar Khalsa – backing vocals (3)
- Mark McGuire – guitar (5)
- Rick Nelson – cello (4), contrabass (4, 7), violin (4, 7)
- Steven "Doc" Patt – contrabass (3, 10), pedal steel guitar (3, 7–8, 10)
- Jon Ramm – trombone (8)
- Matt Schluessler – bass (6)
- Mathias Schneeberger – synthesizer (1), guitar (4, 8), bass (4, 8–9), drums (9)
- Jon Skibic – guitar (1, 2–6, 9–10), bass (2)
- Jon Theodore – drums (2, 6)
- Christopher Thorn – production, mixing
- Brad Walker – saxophone (8)
- Meg Webb – harp (10)
- Howie Weinberg – mastering

== Release history ==
Release dates and formats for Random Desire
Region	Date	Format(s)	Label(s)	Ref.
Various	February 21, 2020	CD; digital download; streaming; vinyl	Royal Cream, BMG	
