= A Stitch in Time (EP) =

EP by The Twilight Singers
- Released: December 4, 2006
- Recorded: Helsinki, New Orleans, Los Angeles
- Genre: Indie rock
- Length: 22:57
- Label: One Little Indian
- Producer: Greg Dulli

The Twilight Singers chronology
Powder Burns (2006)	A Stitch in Time (2006)	Dynamite Steps (2011)

Professional ratings
Review scores
Source	Rating
Allmusic	3/5 stars

A Stitch in Time is the second EP released by The Twilight Singers. The five song EP was first released on iTunes on October 10, 2006. Hard copies were then released in the UK on December 4, 2006, and in the US on January 23, 2007. A Stitch in Time features guest appearances by Mark Lanegan and Joseph Arthur. "Live with Me" is a Massive Attack cover, while "Flashback" is a Fat Freddy's Drop cover.

== Track listing ==
1. "Live with Me" (featuring Mark Lanegan) – 4:00
2. "Sublime" (featuring Joseph Arthur) – 4:11
3. "Flashback" (featuring Mark Lanegan) – 4:09
4. "They Ride" – 5:17
5. "The Lure Would Prove Too Much" – 5:20

== Personnel ==
- Greg Dulli - vocals (all tracks), guitar (1, 3, 4, 5), Rhodes (2), percussion (2), piano (5)
- Peter Adams - mellotron/organ (5)
- Joseph Arthur - vocals/bass/programming/Dobro (2)
- Scott Ford - bass (1, 3, 4), vocals (4)
- Jeff Klein - strings (1), organ (3), vocals (3)
- Mark Lanegan - vocals (1, 3)
- Bobby MacIntyre - drums (1, 3, 5)
- Mike Napolitano - guitar (4)
- Dave Rosser - guitar (1, 3), vocals (3, 4)
- Mathias Schneeberger - guitar (1, 3), clavinet (3)
- Jon Skibic - guitar (2, 4, 5), lap steel (5), vocals (5)
- Shane Soloski - bass (5)
- Greg Wieczorek - drums (2, 4), vocals (4)

== Credits ==
- "Live with Me" written by Terry Callier, Robert Del Naja and Neil Davidge.
- "Sublime" written by Greg Dulli and Joseph Arthur.
- "Flashback" written by Faiumu/Maxwell/Kerr/Lindsay/Laing/Gordon/Tamaira.
- "They Ride" written by Greg Dulli and Rick McCollum.
- "The Lure Would Prove Too Much" written by Greg Dulli.
