= Dynamite Steps =

Studio album by The Twilight Singers
- Released: February 14, 2011
- Recorded: 2010 in Los Angeles, Joshua Tree and Arcadia, California; New Orleans and Bogalusa, Louisiana
- Genre: Indie rock
- Length: 43:40
- Label: Sub Pop
- Producers: "The Syndicate" (Greg Dulli, Mathias Schneeberger, Dave Rosser, Steve Nalepa, Eric Weaver, and Tommaso Colliva)

The Twilight Singers chronology
A Stitch in Time (EP) (2006)	Dynamite Steps (2011)

Singles from Dynamite Steps
- 1. "On the Corner" Released: February 14, 2011; 2. "Blackbird and the Fox" Released: July 25, 2011

Professional ratings
Review scores
Source	Rating
AllMusic	3.5/5 stars
CHARTattack	3.5/5 stars
Consequence of Sound	3.5/5 stars
InYourSpeakers	(68/100)
NME	(6/10)
Paste	(7.6/10)
Pitchfork Media	(7.9/10)
Spin	(8/10)

Dynamite Steps is the fifth full-length album by Greg Dulli's The Twilight Singers. It was released on February 14, 2011, worldwide, and a day later in the United States via Sub Pop on CD and double 12" white-colored vinyl. The front cover was designed by Rachel Owen.

The Sub Pop pre-order for Dynamite Steps includes a two-track CD-R featuring two unreleased Twilight Singers tracks, "Don't Call" and "Ballad of Pure Thought". The band marked the album's release with in-store performances at Amoeba Music on February 15, 2011, (Los Angeles) and February 17, 2011, (San Francisco).

The band performed the first single "On the Corner" on Jimmy Kimmel Live! and the Late Show with David Letterman.

== Track listing ==
1. "Last Night in Town" – 4:44
2. "Be Invited" – 3:15
3. "Waves" – 4:02
4. "Get Lucky" – 4:12
5. "On the Corner" – 4:26
6. "Gunshots" – 3:43
7. "She Was Stolen" – 3:15
8. "Blackbird and the Fox" – 2:53
9. "Never Seen No Devil" – 3:02
10. "The Beginning of the End" – 3:15
11. "Dynamite Steps" – 6:45

== Personnel ==
- Greg Dulli – vocals (all songs), guitar (1, 2, 3, 4, 6, 8, 9, 10), piano (1, 2, 5, 6, 7), synth bass (1, 3), mellotron (1), bass (2), drums (2, 10, 11), Rhodes (3, 5, 10, 11), electric guitar (7), Prophet (7)
- Joseph Arthur – vocals (6, 9), harmonica (9)
- Joshua Blanchard – dobro (9)
- Ani DiFranco – vocals (8)
- Amy Farris – violin/viola/cello (4)
- Scott Ford – bass (1, 3, 4, 5, 6, 7, 8, 9, 11), vocals (4)
- Petra Haden – violin (4, 9), vocals (9)
- David Henderson – drums (1)
- Chris Jordan – piano (4)
- Mark Lanegan – vocals (2)
- Leta Lucy – vocals (10, 11)
- Nick McCabe – guitar (2)
- Steve Nalepa – synth (1), strings (7)
- Mike Napolitano – timpani (7)
- Rick G. Nelson – violin (2, 8), cello (8)
- Dave Rosser – guitar (1, 3, 4, 5, 6, 8, 9, 10, 11), vocals (1, 3, 4, 6, 8), acoustic guitar (7)
- Carina Round – vocals (10)
- Mathias Schneeberger – guitar solo (1), guitar (5), bass (9)
- Jon Skibic – guitar (1, 10, 11), bass (10)
- Cully Symington – drums (3, 4, 7, 8)
- Gene Trautmann – drums (5)
- Greg Wieczorek – drums (6, 9, 11), vocals (6), percussion (9)
