= Ashley Dzerigian =

Ashley Reeve
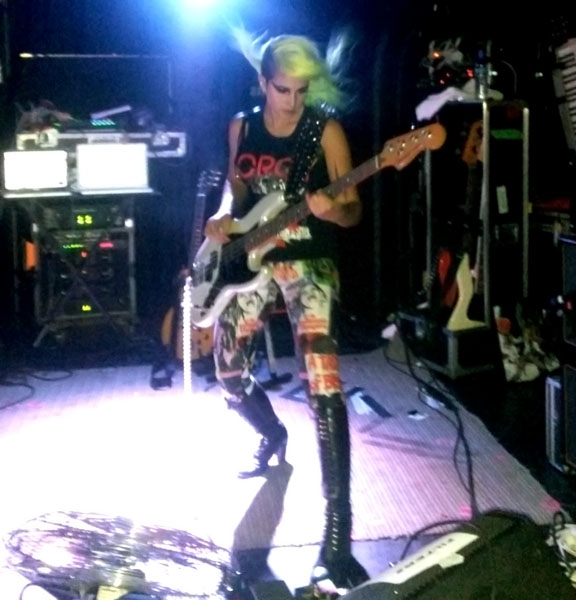
- Dzerigian in 2016

Background information
- Birth name: Ashley Brooke Beauchamp
- Born: January 22, 1983 (age 42); La Verne, California, United States
- Origin: Los Angeles, California, United States
- Genres: Indie rock, rock
- Instrument(s): Bass guitar, Oboe, Double bass
- Years active: 2000–present

Ashley Brooke Reeve (née Beauchamp; born 22 January 1983) also known as Ashley Dzerigian is an American bass player. She previously played for Adam Lambert, Maximum Hedrum, CeeLo Green, My Jerusalem and Beastie Boys' keyboardist Money Mark. She was a member of the band Filter and plays for Cher. She is a graduate of the California Institute of the Arts and lives in Las Vegas, Nevada. She plays Fender bass guitars.

Reeve previously played for indie-rock band Great Northern. Great Northern released two studio albums and one extended play. On December 29, 2011 Adam Lambert introduced her as his new bassist.

== Biography ==
=== Early life ===
Reeve was 11 years old when she started playing in the school band on oboe, after she was told that none of her peers used it. She quickly mastered the instrument and immediately drew the attention of the director, who suggested that she play the bass guitar as a second instrument. She immediately began taking private lessons, and by 13, she mastered the double bass. She played in all the musical groups in her school, including the orchestra, jazz ensemble and choir. Reeve attended the prestigious Los Angeles County High School for the Arts (LACHSA). Since music for her was something more than just a hobby, she continued playing on bass guitar and bass at the California Institute of the Arts, focusing on jazz, Latin and Afro-Cuban music, and working with mentors such as Alphonso Johnson (Wayne Shorter, Weather Report), Todd Johnson (six-string bass pioneer) and double-bass virtuoso, Darek Oles. Once she graduated from the institute in 2005, she immediately joined the world of indie rock, touring worldwide and recording music with several indie bands and artists.

== Early career (2005–2011) ==
Shortly after leaving Great Northern, Reeve toured with Jeff Klein in 2008, eventually prompting him to create the band My Jerusalem with other singers he toured with that year. My Jerusalem released Without Feathers and Gone For Good before Ashley left to join Adam Lambert's band in early 2012. She also joined UK singer/songwriter Ed Harcourt and Beastie Boys keyboardist Money Mark for their respective tours.

== 2011–2013 ==
In November 2011, a mutual friend of Reeve and Fender аrtist Tommy Joe Ratliff sent her to audition for American Idol alumnus Adam Lambert. She auditioned successfully and began making television appearances on shows such as The Ellen DeGeneres Show, The Tonight Show with Jay Leno, American Idol, Good Morning America, and Jimmy Kimmel Live, in addition to performances at venues across the world. In late 2012, Adam made a cameo in Pretty Little Liars with his touring band (including Ashley) on the Halloween special, "This is a Dark Ride." On January 22, 2013, she joined the band Maximum Hedrum as bassist for their mini South American summer tour.

== 2014–present ==
On January 22, 2014, it was announced in a fan email that Reeve would be replacing Noah Harmon of The Airborne Toxic Event for a series of shows in 2014, as Noah takes a paternity leave of absence. In mid February, Reeve stepped down due to unforeseen, last-minute circumstances and was replaced by Adrian Rodriquez. She later joined Cee-Lo Green for his 2014 tour. In 2015, Filter frontman Richard Patrick announced on the band's Facebook page that Dzerigian, along with Oumi Kapila and Chris Reeve, had joined Patrick and Bobby Miller for the band's new album Crazy Eyes and subsequent world tour. She left the band in 2019.

== Other work ==
Reeve provided the bass guitar sound for the character Marceline the Vampire Queen in the Cartoon Network show Adventure Time.

Ashley was also featured on Fender showcasing the Fender American Deluxe Dimension Bass V.

== Personal life ==
Ashley married the artist Ron Dzerigian at the age of 24. They are now divorced.

She married Australian rockstar drummer and former Filter bandmate Chris Reeve twice in the last week of March, 2018. The first wedding took place in America, where magician Siegfried Tieber performed for guests. The second was a traditional outback themed ceremony, officiated by Kevin Bloody Wilson, in Reeve’s home town of Perth, Western Australia.

== Discography ==
=== Studio albums ===
With My Jerusalem

- Gone For Good (2010)
- Preachers (2012)

With Great Northern

- Trading Twilight for Daylight (2007)
- Sleepy Eepee

With Ed Harcourt

- Lustre (2010)

With Filter (band)

- Crazy Eyes (2016)

== Filmography ==
Films credits
Year	Title	Role	Notes
2012	Pretty Little Liars	Herself	"Cameo" (Season 3, Episode 13)
