= My Jerusalem =

- Origin: Austin, Texas, United States
- Genres: Alternative Rock, Indie Rock, Post-punk, Dark Wave
- Years active: 2010–present
- Labels: Razor And Tie, The End Records, One Little Indian
- Members: Jeff Klein; Ross Dubois
- Past members: Dave Rosser (deceased); Ashley Dzerigian; Geena Spigarelli; Cully Symington; Grant Van Amburgh; Kyle Robarge; Jon Merz
- Website: www.thisismyjerusalem.com

My Jerusalem is an American Indie Rock band based in Austin, Texas. The band consists of Jeff Klein (vocals) and Ross Dubois (bass guitar). The band rose to critical acclaim after releasing their debut album Gone For Good.

== Career beginnings ==
In its initial stages, My Jerusalem was a revolving door collective. My Jerusalem's connecting thread was Jeff Klein, who had played with each of the band's current members on his solo tour and as a touring and recording member of The Twilight Singers and The Gutter Twins Jeff first met Dave Rosser, a touring member of the Twilight Singers, through producer Mike Napolitano. Drummer Cully Symington was in bands like Cursive and Bishop Allen and The Gutter Twins. Rick Nelson, who plays violin, viola, cello and keyboards in the band, is a longtime member of the Polyphonic Spree and St. Vincent. Matt Bricker, also a member of the Polyphonic Spree, has been playing with The Low Lows. Klein said that "I didn't actually start out thinking of forming a band. I'd played with all of them at different times, and I was like, 'How great would it be to play with all of these people at the same time?' And then when we did it made perfect sense for that to be what we do. We clicked immediately.".

== 2009-2011, Without Feathers and Gone For Good ==
With encouragement by the late David Rosser, Jeff Klein decided to form his own band. My Jerusalem's grand introduction was at SXSW 2009, in what band members considered their "opening night."

My Jerusalem's debut EP, Without Feathers, was released March 10, 2010, consists of five tracks: Sweet Chariot, Under Your Skin, Heroin(e), Turtledove, and Remember Everything, through 2:59 Records. In June 2009, both AOL/Spinner and Apple declared My Jerusalem as buzzworthy and promoted the song Sweet Chariot. In October 2009 My Jerusalem embarked on a US tour with Har Mar Superstar and also played the CMJ Music Festival

In late 2010, the band released their debut album Gone For Good and received mostly positive reception. The band quickly gained support from well respected outlets such as BBC 6Music which hosted a live session on Marc Rileys show and NPR featuring them on All Songs Considered. The album contains 12 tracks, including two from their EP (Sweet Chariot and Remember Everything). Love You When You Leave and Boom! Boom! Boom! Goes the Trolley, a non-album single, were also released in 2010.

My Jerusalem had many performances for Gone For Good, such as being on BBC Radio6, appearances at the Frequency Festival, and several other bands.

The singles The Daytrotter Sessions and Holidaze With You were released in 2011.

== 2012-2013 Preachers ==
Produced by Jim Eno of Spoon (band) and recorded in under three weeks in Public Hi-Fi studio with Jon Merz on guitar, keyboards, and horns, Michael St Clair on violin, keyboards, and horns, Cully Symington on Drums, and Ashley Dzerigian on bass,

On October 9, 2012, the band released their second studio album, Preachers. The album received generally favorable reviews, with many noting that the record sounded much darker than the band's previous work. Klein himself stated this darker sound felt more "comfortable" for him.[13] The album contained entirely new material with different influences more cohesiveness.

"It's a darker record," says Klein. "So much had changed since Gone For Good. We'd all kind of been through hell and back again in different ways, and this was the natural artistic result of all of that. But I think it's a beautiful, comforting darkness. It's real, but not selfish."

A remix of the track Death Valley (by Jason Sebastian Russo and Chuck Davis of the band Guiding Light) was featured on the soundtrack to the show Suits (U.S. TV series) for the episode

== 2013-2015, Touring ==
My Jerusalem performed at SXSW Festival in 2013.

During 2014, My Jerusalem went on tour with Peter Murphy, with over one hundred tour dates.

My Jerusalem also toured with the Lemonheads and The Psychedelic Furs in 2014.

In 2015, My Jerusalem opened for Courtney Love.

== 2016 - A Little Death ==
My Jerusalem's third studio album was released June 24, 2016, on cd and vinyl through Washington Square Music. The song Young Leather features background vocals by Elle King and was recently featured on the show Nashville.

Released shortly after the death of his mother, Jeff Klein stated "..... It means everything to me! I don't know. When we made it, I wanted to make something that I felt was meaningful to me, and something that I felt would really speak for where my head was at. I suppose I used it as a self-help thing, because I was in a really dark place and I felt if I went back to writing songs as medication, it would help. Which it did. It's a little autobiographical, which most of my work ends up being. I went to where my mom is from in New York and just holed up in the winter and wrote everything there as a way to feel I was in touch more with myself and where I came from. You tend to sometimes just be a zombie on a treadmill in this world, just going forward and doing whatever, and so I wanted to take a second and make sure I was okay. Or at least make myself feel a little bit better and get healthier as person. And I think writing these songs did that."

My Jerusalem also toured with several bands throughout the year including Elliot Summer, with The Psychedelic Furs, Against Me!, Hamilton Leithauser, and The Sounds.

== 2017–present ==
Former member Dave Rosser died on June 27, 2017, from colorectal cancer in New Orleans, Louisiana. He was 50.

In 2018, My Jerusalem released a cover of L.A. Freeway, originally by Guy Clark.

== Notable live appearances ==
- Austin City Limits Festival 2013
- ESPN X Games, 2014
- Colours of Ostrava Festival, CZ 2013
- KGSR Blues On The Green, 2013
- Suikerrock Festival, Tienen BE 2013
- Edward Sharp and the Magnetic Zeros, European support tour 2012
- X (American Band) US support tour 2012/2013
- Peter Murphy celebrates 25 years of Bauhaus, US support tour 2013
- Peter Murphy LION tour, US support 2014
- FM4 Frequency Festival, St Polten AU 2012
- Winterthur Musikfestwochen, Winterthur CH 2012
- Heartless Bastards, US support tour 2013
- Psychedelic Furs, US support tour 2013
- Psychedelic Furs and The Lemonheads, US support tour 2014
- Against Me!, US support tour May 2016
- Hamilton Leithauser, US support tour May 2015
- Spoon (band), Auditorium Shores support March 2015

== Discography ==
Without Feathers [EP]

Gone For Good

Preachers (2012)

A Little Death (2016)
