= Tramps Like Us (disambiguation) =

Tramps Like Us is a Japanese manga series.

Tramps Like Us may also refer to:

- Tramps Like Us (album), a 2004 album by Kacy Crowley
- Tramps Like Us, a memoir by screenwriter and author Kristen Buckley
- "Tramps Like Us" (The IT Crowd), a 2008 television episode
