= 54 Seconds =

American rock band

- Origin: Austin, Texas, U.S.
- Genres: Alternative rock, power pop, psychedelic rock
- Years active: 1998–2002
- Labels: Rock Ridge
- Members: Spencer Gibb; J.J. Johnson; Stewart Cochran; Glenn McGregor

54 Seconds were an American rock band from Austin, Texas. Consisting of Spencer Gibb on vocals and guitar, J.J. Johnson on drums and vocals, Stewart Cochran on piano, synthesizer, keyboard and vocals and Glenn McGregor on bass. The band was formed after Gibb released his debut album 4-Track Mind with some musicians later joined this group.

== Early years ==
Gibb is the eldest son of Robin Gibb of the Bee Gees. His mother is Molly Hullis, who worked as the personal assistant to Beatles' manager Brian Epstein until his death. The group's story originally begins with a dream, a dream that Gibb had in Miami, Florida, urging him to move to Texas: "If there's anything I can say about living in Miami and doing drugs, it's that I learned to play guitar". Gibb formed a band called Jez Spencer; the original line-up was Gibb, Johnson, Stewart Cochran, Johnny Goudie and Einar. Johnson suggested Cochran, who he had seen play with Abra Moore and David Garza. Gibb e-mailed Cochran, who at the time was touring Europe with Jimmy LaFave. When Cochran got back to Texas, he hooked up with Johnson and Gibb at the Austin Rehearsal Complex (ARC), and after hearing some demos, agreed to join the band. Later, Johnny Goudie left to form his own band, Goudie. After eight months, Einar also left to join Goudie. The remaining members played with a number of bassists including George Reiff. For the next few months, Jez Spencer played shows, until Reiff left the band.

== Popularity ==
The quartet are popular in the Austin, Texas area and play every week at the Speakeasy at 412 Congress Avenue.

They released their first full length studio album Postcards from California in 2007 by Rock Ridge Music.

== Discography ==
=== Studio albums ===
- Postcards from California (2007)

=== EPs ===
- E.P. (1998)
- Promo (1999)
- Promo 2 (2001)
- Coma (2003)
- Promography (2003)
- Memoirs of the Superficially Happy (2005)

=== Singles ===
- "World Stood Still"
- "Ben's Letter"

=== Live albums ===
- Live at Antones February 24 (2001)
- Live at Antones May 25 (2001)
- Live at Hole in the Wall March 4 (2001)
- Live at La Zona Rosa April 14 (2001)
- Live at Speakeasy April 18 (2001)
- Live at Speakeasy February 26 (2001)
- Live at Speakeasy March 12 (2001)
- Live at Speakeasy March 29 (2001)
