= Great Northern (indie band) =

American rock band

- Origin: Los Angeles, California
- Genres: Indie rock, indie pop
- Years active: 2005–present
- Members: Solon Bixler; Rachel Stolte
- Website: www.greatnorthern.art

Great Northern is a rock group originally from Los Angeles composed of lead vocalist/multi instrumentalist Rachel Stolte, and guitarist/vocalist/multi instrumentalist Solon Bixler (formerly of Thirty Seconds to Mars). In 2007, they were signed with the independent label Eenie Meenie Records, where they released their debut album, Trading Twilight For Daylight (2007), and their second album, Remind Me Where the Light Is (2009).

== History ==
=== Trading Twilight for Daylight (2007) ===
After recruiting drummer Davey Latter and bassist Ashley Dzerigia, Great Northern hung around Los Angeles while completing material for a debut album. Great Northern signed with the indie label Eenie Meenie Records in the summer of 2006 and began recording with producer Mathias Schneeberger. The band's debut album was completed after about 6 months of song writing, Trading Twilight For Daylight.

The album was recorded at the Donner & Blitzen studio in Arcadia, CA, together with producer/engineer Mathias Schneeberger, whose previous work experience includes Twilight Singers' Joseph Arthur. Having met Schneeberger through a mutual friend, they quickly grew fond of his contributions to the album. The album title was coined by Rachel Stolte, who said that twilight is her favorite time of day. Trading Twilight For Daylight was released in the U.S. on May 15, 2007.

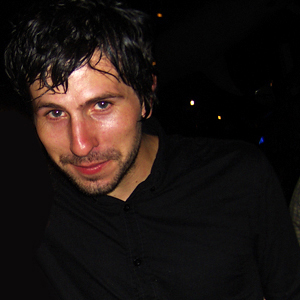
Great Northern (indie band)

=== Sleepy Eepee (2008) ===
The EP originally was written and recorded before "Trading Twilight For Daylight", but was re-released with new artwork by Ryan Coscia and released to stores March 18, 2008. Sleepy Eepee was originally recorded between 2003 and 004 at The Ship.

=== Remind Me Where The Light Is and acting (2009) ===
On April 28, 2009, the band released their second studio album entitled Remind Me Where the Light Is. Wishing to do things differently, Great Northern worked with new producers. "We took a lot more risks by entering uncomfortable territory that wasn't touched on the last record," Bixler says. "We dug deeper into the unpleasant, which helped us to find the beauty." Rachel Stolte and Solon Bixler also had supporting roles in the film Etienne!, released in 2010.

=== 2010–2022 ===
On September 8, 2010, the band posted via Twitter that for the past three months they have been in the studio recording their third album. As of February 2012, work on the album was still in progress.

Great Northern released three songs on Bandcamp. Holes was released in 2012, Skin of Our Teeth in 2013, and Human in 2014

On June 12, 2015, Tremors was released on Google Play and iTunes as an album, and on Bandcamp on July 7

=== Since 2023 ===
In January, Great Northern started releasing singles, with a full album set for late fall.

== Other media ==
A few songs ended up in advertisements as well as on both the big and small screens – "Low Is a Height" soundtracked a few NBA commercials, while "Home" was featured in a Nissan advert. The song "Home" was used in a 2008 Nissan Murano commercial, advertising a redesigned 2009 Murano. "Home" was also featured in the movie 21 starring Jim Sturgess.

Their song "Low is a Height" was used in the NBA's "There Can Only Be One" commercials; starring Paul Pierce & Mike Bibby and also Dwight Howard & Chris Paul. "Low is a Height" was also featured in a video montage sequence at the end of the 8th Episode of Bones in the third season.

They recorded their song "Into the Sun" in Simlish for the EP The Sims 2: Free Time.

The song "Driveway" was featured at the end of the 18th episode of Grey's Anatomy, in the fifth season and at the end of The Son, the fifth episode of Friday Night Lights' fourth season.

Their song "Houses" was used in the movie The Roommate and in The Magicians season 4 finale.

== Band members ==
=== Current members ===
- Rachel Stolte – vocals, multi instrumentalist (2005–present)
- Solon Bixler – guitar, vocals, multi instrumentalist (2005–present)

=== Former members ===
- Ashley Dzerigian – Bass (2005–2007)
- Davey Latter – drums (2005–2009)

== Discography ==
=== Albums ===
- Trading Twilight for Daylight (2007)
- Remind Me Where the Light Is (2009)
- Tremors (2015)

=== EPs ===
- Sleepy Eepee (2008)
