= Effects of Madness =

...Effects of Madness

Studio album by Goudie
- Released: March 5, 2002
- Genre: Rock
- Label: India
- Producer: Mark Addison

Goudie chronology
Peep Show (2000)	...Effects of Madness (2002)

Professional ratings
Review scores
Source	Rating
AllMusic	3/5 stars
Austin Chronicle	3.5/5 stars
Rolling Stone	(favorable)

...Effects of Madness is the second and final album by Goudie. It was recorded at the Slaughter House and at Johnny Goudie's house in Austin, Texas. The song Leave it Alone features vocals by Patty Griffin, and Jeff Klein played keyboard on the track Don't You Love Him When He's Cruel. The album's cover art, designed by Tracy Goudie, was a top 5 finalist in the 2001–2002 Austin Music Poll.

== Track listing ==
1. "Nobody's Perfect"
2. "The Ride"
3. "Leave it Alone"
4. "Down"
5. "Upside Down and Pink"
6. "Already Here"
7. "Collapse"
8. "Wasted"
9. "Don't You Love Him When He's Cruel"
10. "Cellophane"
11. "Hello, Good Morning"
