= She Loves You (The Twilight Singers album) =

Studio album by The Twilight Singers
- Released: August 24, 2004
- Recorded: Los Angeles, Pasadena and Catania
- Genre: Alternative rock, indie rock
- Length: 39:39
- Label: One Little Indian
- Producer: Greg Dulli and Dave Hillis

The Twilight Singers chronology
Blackberry Belle (2003)	She Loves You (2004)	Powder Burns (2006)

Singles from She Loves You
- 1. "Too Tough to Die" / "Hard Time Killing Floor" Released: November 15, 2004

Professional ratings
Review scores
Source	Rating
Allmusic	4/5 stars
Rolling Stone	3/5 stars
Pitchfork Media	(7.4/10)

She Loves You is the third full-length album by The Twilight Singers and their first covers album. It contains covers from various genres, including jazz, blues, soul, R&B, rock and trip hop. The artists covered include John Coltrane, Skip James, Marvin Gaye, Mary J. Blige, Fleetwood Mac and Björk.

She Loves You was released in 2004 by One Little Indian Records. The website Turntable Kitchen describes the Twilight Singers' takes on the source material as "lusty, smoky and simmering."

== Track listing ==
1. "Feeling of Gaze" (Hope Sandoval) - 2:21
2. "Too Tough to Die" (Martina Topley-Bird) - 4:02
3. "Hyperballad" (Björk) - 4:56
4. "Strange Fruit" (Billie Holiday) - 3:29
5. "What Makes You Think You're the One" (Lindsey Buckingham) - 3:46
6. "Real Love" (Mary J. Blige) - 4:25
7. "Hard Time Killing Floor" (Skip James) - 3:15
8. "A Love Supreme" (John Coltrane) - 2:03
9. "Please Stay (Once You Go Away)" (Marvin Gaye) - 4:03
10. "Black Is the Color of My True Love's Hair" (Traditional, arrangement Dulli) - 4:25
11. "Summertime" (George Gershwin) - 2:54
12. "Her Majesty" (Beatles) (bonus on LP release)

== Personnel ==
- Greg Dulli – vocals (all songs), guitar (1, 2, 3, 4, 5, 6, 7, 8, 9, 10), piano (1, 5, 6, 9, 10), bass (3), drums (3), dobro (7), keyboards (11), melodica (11)
- Manuel Agnelli - guitar (11)
- Joshua Blanchard - loops (6, 9)
- Scott Ford - bass (2, 4, 8, 9, 10)
- Dave Hillis - Producer/Engineer, guitar (3)
- Mark Lanegan - vocals (3, 4, 6, 7, 8)
- Bobby Macintyre - drums (2, 4, 5, 6, 8, 9), percussion (3), vocals (6, 9)
- Molly McGuire - vocals (10)
- John Nooney - piano (2, 4), keyboards (3), rhodes (8, 9)
- Mathias Schneeberger - Rhodes (10)
- Jon Skibic - guitars (2, 3, 4, 5, 6, 8, 9, 10), lapsteel (6), vocals (9), percussion (10)
- Helen Storer - vocals (3)
- Michael Sullivan - bass (5, 6)
- Jesse Tobias - dobro (7)
- Brian Young - drums/percussion (10)
