= Jason Karaban =

American singer-songwriter

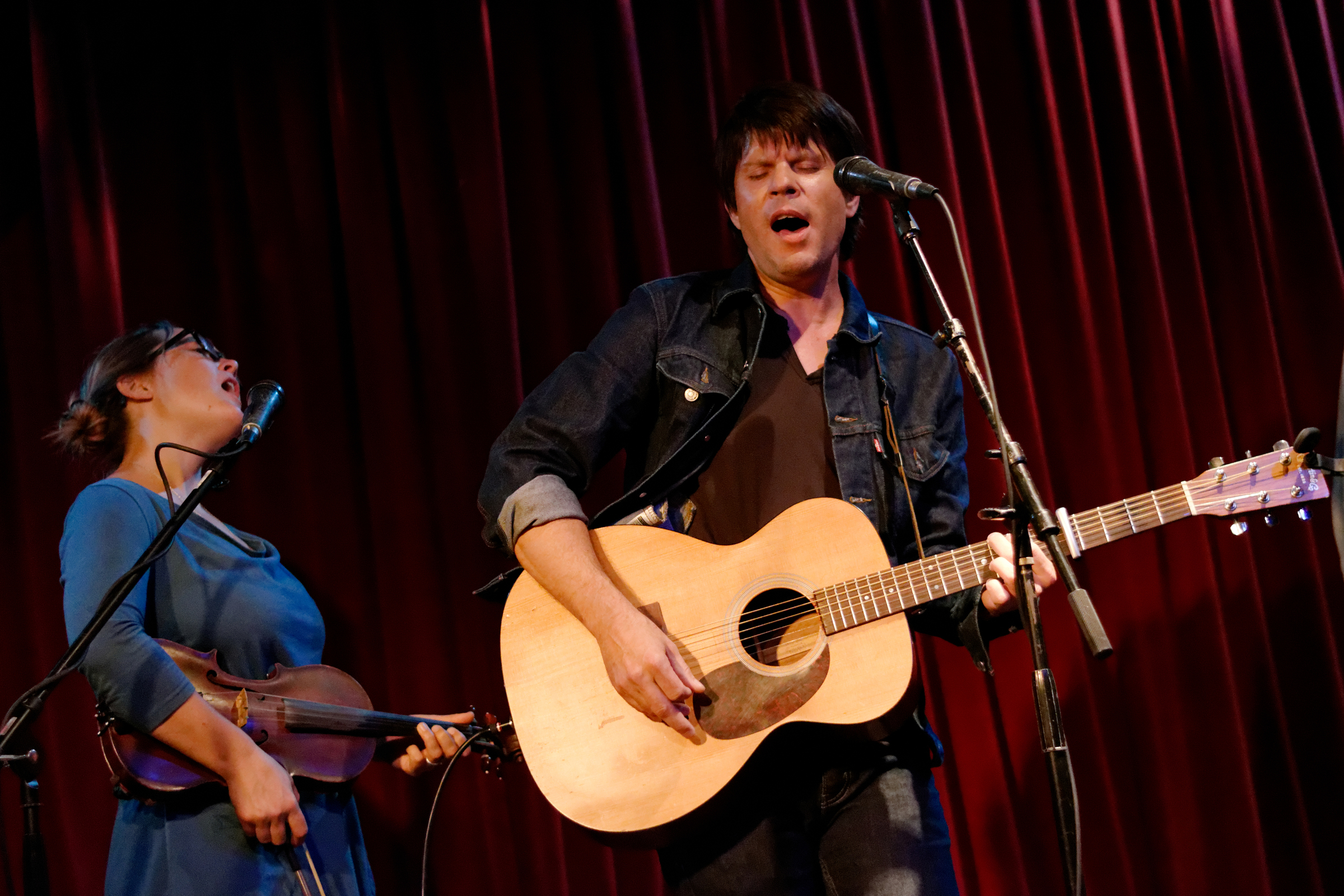

Background information
- Born: Jason Karaban; Norristown, Pennsylvania
- Origin: Philadelphia, Pennsylvania, now Los Angeles
- Genres: Alternative rock, Alternative country, Pop, Americana
- Occupations: Singer-songwriter, Musician
- Years active: 1997–present
- Labels: Maverick Records, Ascend Records
- Website: http://www.facebook.com/jasonkaraban

Jason Karaban is an American singer-songwriter and musician living in Los Angeles, California. Karaban first began his career fronting the Philadelphia-based indie rock band Dragstrip Courage in 1997, and Grand in 2000. He emerged as a solo artist with the release of Doomed to Make Choices, in 2006, co-produced with Mike Napolitano (Joseph Arthur, The Twilight Singers). Along with vocals, Karaban plays acoustic guitar, 12-string and electric guitar, bass guitar, keyboards, piano and drums. Karaban has released four critically acclaimed albums, and has had a number of songs featured in film and television shows Over the course of his career, Karaban has collaborated with many notable musicians including Ani DiFranco, Lucy Schwartz, Sara Watkins and Sean Watkins (Nickel Creek), Garrison Starr, Taylor Momsen, Dave Pirner (Soul Asylum), Glen Phillips (Toad the Wet Sprocket) and Benmont Tench (Tom Petty and The Heartbreakers).

== Critical response ==
Karaban at the Hotel Café in Los Angeles with Lucy Schwartz, and members of Elvis Costello's band The Imposters and Counting Crows

Tracks from the 2006 album Doomed to Make Choices were licensed extensively by film and television, including placement in the romantic comedy Novel Romance the thriller Lure, and used in television shows from FX Networks, the Oxygen Channel, VH-1, MTV, NBC and ABC. His album's have also received regular airplay from WXPN in Philadelphia, WFMU in Jersey City and KCRW in Los Angeles.

Karaban's Mayfly album was named as one of alt-country magazine No Depression's "Top 10 Albums of 2009". The album employs images of fallen soldiers in civil war battles to invoke subtle political messages relevant to current events.

Glide Magazine lists Karaban's recent single, Succeed 101, in its Stranger's Almanac: Best of 2009.

AOL's "Spinner" featured Jason Karaban's song "Succeed 101" as their MP3 Download of the Day.

Karaban was featured as The Deli Magazine's Los Angeles Artist Of The Month (Published on Thu, 2 Apr 2009).

In 2019 Karaban teamed up with singer-songwriter Glen Phillips (Toad the Wet Sprocket) to write the song "Look Me In The Eye" - inspired by, and featured in, the documentary FREE TRIP TO EGYPT

== Discography ==
=== Albums ===
- Doomed to Make Choices – released July 7, 2006 (Ascend Records). Includes: Crying Spell, Perfect Falling Out, Great Unknown, Cracked, Unsolved, Look What You’ve Done, Cicada, Time is Now, For Nothing, Gone, Don’t You Love When That Happens, Play Dumb, and Ambulance. Artists Ani DiFranco, Dave Pirner (Soul Asylum), C.C. Adcock, Jeff Klein, Ivan Neville (Keith Richards, Neville Brothers) David Immerglück (Counting Crows) and Pete Thomas (Elvis Costello) and Greg Leisz (Ray LaMontagne) all made contributions to the album.
- Leftovers – released August 15, 2006 (Ascend Records). Includes: Oughta Know, Maybe You’re Right, Eating My Heart Out, Thread, Harm's Reaches, First Love Song, Again, Drag the Night, Into, Backslide, Beat ‘til Now, Scattered, Fall Down, and Sleep. Artists Ivan Neville and Priscilla Ahn also made contributions to the album.
- Sobriety Kills – released January 6, 2009 (Ascend Records). Sobriety Kills includes contributions from David Immerglück of the Counting Crows, Toad the Wet Sprocket's Glen Phillips, Ani DiFranco, and Pete Thomas from Elvis Costello's band The Attractions The album includes: Sobriety Kills, Middle of the Storm, Don’t Start Without Me, Because I Love You, Oughta Know, Perfect Falling Out, Thread, Old As You Are Young, Not Afraid to Die, Make It Over, All in a Day's Dream, Tried Untrue, and Hurry Up.
- "Shift" releases September 2012.

=== EPs ===
- Mayfly – EP released April 7, 2009 (Ascend Records). EP includes: Sullivan Ballou, No Casualties, A Far Better Place. Mayfly is a Civil war concept album and includes contributions from Neil Larsen (Leonard Cohen) and Lucy Schwartz.

=== Singles ===
- Succeed 101 – released November 17, 2009 (New Model Music). Succeed 101 is a preview of Karaban's EP Just Enough, Just in Case, and includes contributions from Lucy Schwartz and Pete Thomas (Elvis Costello).
- "You're Already Home" – released February 8, 2011 (New Model Music).

=== Appears On ===
- Undiscovered – Various artists, released August 19, 2008 (Media Creature Music/12X12).
- "Nevermind My Blues" – Ben Arnold, released 2007 (Rope-a-Dope Records).
- Landmark Theatres and Filter Magazine's "Winter 2010 Sampler" – Artists on sampler – Jason Karaban, Tom Waits, Air, Florence and the Machine, AM, The Submarines, Noah And The Whale, The Elves Of Heaven (featuring Martin Clancy) and Active Child.

=== Music videos ===
- Sullivan Ballou, released April 7, 2009 (Ascend Records).

== See also ==
- WBCN Rock & Roll Rumble (for early appearance of Karaban's Philadelphia band Dragstrip Courage in the 2000 Rumble)
