= Powder Burns =

Studio album by The Twilight Singers
- Released: May 16, 2006
- Recorded: 2005–2006
- Genres: Indie rock, alternative rock
- Length: 48:48
- Language: English
- Label: One Little Indian
- Producers: Greg Dulli, Mike Napolitano

The Twilight Singers chronology
She Loves You (2004)	Powder Burns (2006)	A Stitch in Time (EP) (2006)

Singles from Powder Burns
- 1. "There's Been an Accident" Released: May 15, 2006; 2. "I'm Ready" Released: July 10, 2006

Professional ratings
Review scores
Source	Rating
Allmusic	4/5 stars
Pitchfork Media	(7.9/10)
The Skinny	5/5 stars
Transform Online	(positive)

Powder Burns is the fourth album by Greg Dulli's The Twilight Singers. It was released on May 15, 2006, via One Little Indian Records on CD and double 12" vinyl. Powder Burns was partly recorded with extra power generators in a deserted New Orleans studio just after the floods caused by Hurricane Katrina. The album was also recorded in Los Angeles, Brooklyn, Milan, and Catania.

During the album recording in 2005, Greg Dulli was aided by Manuel Agnelli, of the Italian rock band Afterhours, who co-wrote "My Time (Has Come)" and "The Conversation", the lyrics for which were inspired by the 1974 Francis Ford Coppola film of the same name. "My Time (Has Come)" was first released in 2005 as "White Widow" on Afterhours' Ballads for Little Hyenas, which in turn was co-produced by Dulli. Other collaborators on this album are Joseph Arthur, Jeff Klein and Ani DiFranco. The same recording sessions yielded the follow-up EP A Stitch in Time, released in December 2006.

It was released to extremely positive reviews, and actor/comedian Denis Leary called it "one of the best rock albums I've heard in 10 years," also putting the song "Bonnie Brae" in Rescue Me, his Emmy nominated TV series. Additionally, the song "There's Been an Accident" featured in the 2008 film adaptation of Chuck Palahniuk's novel, Choke.

The Twilight Singers made their live television debut on Jimmy Kimmel Live! on January 3, 2007, performing "Forty Dollars" on YouTube and "Sublime" on YouTube (which did not air), both featuring guest guitarist/vocalist Joseph Arthur.

== Track listing ==
All songs by Dulli except where noted.

=== CD ===
1. "Toward the Waves" – 0:49
2. "I'm Ready" – 3:04
3. "There's Been an Accident" – 5:17
4. "Bonnie Brae" – 4:46
5. "Forty Dollars" – 3:51
6. "Candy Cane Crawl" – 4:27
7. "Underneath the Waves" – 4:28 (Dulli, Skibic)
8. "My Time (Has Come)" – 4:23 (Dulli, Agnelli)
9. "Dead to Rights" – 4:25
10. "The Conversation" – 3:04 (Dulli, Agnelli)
11. "Powder Burns" – 5:52
12. "I Wish I Was" – 4:20 (Dulli, Ford)

=== Double 12" vinyl ===
Side 1 ("Once I count the numbers down"):

1. "Toward the Waves" – 0:49
2. "I'm Ready" – 3:04
3. "There's Been an Accident" – 5:17
4. "Bonnie Brae" – 4:46

Side 2 ("To the end or there around"):

1. "Forty Dollars" – 3:51
2. "Candy Cane Crawl" – 4:27
3. "Underneath the Waves" – 4:28

Side 3 ("Free, or thus, forever bound"):

1. "My Time (Has Come)" – 4:23
2. "Dead to Rights" – 4:25
3. "The Conversation" – 3:04

Side 4 ("For forever's coming down"):

1. "Powder Burns" – 5:52
2. "I Wish I Was" – 4:20

== Personnel ==
- Greg Dulli - vocals (2, 3, 4, 5, 6, 7, 8, 9, 10, 11, 12), guitar (2, 3, 4, 5, 7, 8, 9, 10, 11, 12), bass (2, 5, 8, 10), piano (2, 3, 5, 7, 8, 9), synthesizer (1, 2, 3), mellotron (1, 4, 10, 11), drums (3, 5, 9), wurlitzer (4, 6, 9), programming (8), rhodes (10, 11, 12)
- Peter Adams - organ/synth/mellotron (8)
- Joseph Arthur - vocals (3, 5, 10), dobro (10)
- Scott Bennett - vocals (6)
- Bobby Campo - trumpet (12)
- Dave Catching - guitar (9)
- Daphne Chen - violin (3, 10, 11)
- John Curley - bass (6)
- Ani DiFranco - vocals (4, 6, 11)
- Richard Dodd - cello (3, 10, 11)
- Scott Ford - bass (3, 4, 7, 9, 11, 12), subs (2), vocals (11)
- Sissy Gaines - guitar solo (10)
- Eric Gorfain - violin (3, 10, 11)
- Leah Katz - viola (3, 10, 11)
- Leta Lucy - vocals (9, 12)
- Bobby Macintyre - drums (3, 7), vocals (8), percussion (8)
- Mike Napolitano - guitorgan (6), guitar (8, 9), lead guitar (11)
- Roderick Paulin - saxophone (12)
- Chris Phillips - percussion (10)
- Andy Pizzo - trombone (12)
- Dave Rosser - vocals (11)
- Mathias Schneeberger - organ (1), guitar (1)
- Jon Skibic - guitar (2, 3, 7, 8, 9, 12), ambience (4), vocals (7)
- Michael Sullivan - bass (8)
- Greg Wieczorek - drums (2, 3, 4, 5, 6, 8, 9, 11, 12), vocals (11), percussion (12)

== Singles ==
- "There's Been an Accident" (May 15, 2006) (digital download and promo CD only)
- "I'm Ready" (July 10, 2006) (CD & 7" vinyl)
  - "I'm Ready" (radio edit) b/w: "I'm Ready" (Lo-Fidelity Allstars Remix)
