= Goudie (band) =

- (left-right) Bill Lefler, Johnny Goudie, Jimmy Messer, Einar Pederson

Background information
- Origin: Austin, Texas, United States
- Genres: Alternative rock Glam rock
- Years active: 1996–2002
- Labels: The Music Company (1998–2001); India Records (2001-2002)

Goudie was an American glam rock band from Austin, Texas, fronted by Johnny Goudie.

Goudie started in 1996 as a solo project of frontman Johnny Goudie. In 1997 Johnny's friend Einar Pedersen (who was also a member of Jez Spencer with Johnny Goudie) joined on bass and Bill Lefler replaced the original drummer Kyle Schneider, and Jimmy Messer was brought in as lead guitarist.

In the Spring of 1998, after only being together nine months, and still without a band name, the group played a showcase during the South by Southwest conference in Austin, Texas. Rather than playing a single showscase at a traditional venue, the band rented rehearsal space and played seven showcases throughout the day. The strategy proved successful, and they caught the attention of Dan McCarroll, who was working with Metallica drummer Lars Ulrich to scout for bands to sign to a new record label Ulrich was forming as a subsidiary of Elektra Records. After a second showcase in Los Angeles, California, Ulrich quickly signed the band, making Goudie the second band to be signed to the label (Canadian band DDT being the first). The band decided to simply call themselves Goudie and the label decided to call itself "The Music Company" or TMC.

In July 2000 Goudie released their debut album, Peep Show. The band toured the country with such acts as Blur, Supergrass and Unified Theory, building what would become a large and loyal fan base. The second single from the album, "Drag City", was featured on the compilation album ASCAP's EAR Volume 3.

In 2001 Bill Lefler left the band to pursue session work in Los Angeles. The band took a short break from touring, but in April 2001 Nina Singh (formerly of The Borrowers) replaced Lefler and the band continued to tour and write new songs.

In June 2001 while recording their second album, Goudie, along with every other artist who hadn't sold a million records, was released from their recording contract with Elektra in the wake of corporate reshuffling following Elektra Records' parent company Time Warner's merger with AOL. Shortly thereafter, The Music Company label was dissolved. The band played on, quickly signing with independent label India Records. In July, Jimmy Messer played his last show with Goudie, and Sean Mullens replaced him on lead guitar. Following the ...Effects of Madness tour, the group disbanded after six years.

== Members ==
- Johnny Goudie - vocals, Guitar, Piano
- Einar Pedersen - Bass
- Kyle Schneider - drums (1997–1998)
- Bill Lefler - Drums (1998–2001)
- Nina Singh - Drums (2001–2002)
- Jimmy Messer - Lead Guitar (1998–2001)
- Sean Mullens - Lead Guitar (2001–2002)
- Jonas Wilson - Lead Guitar (2002)
- Mark Addison - Keyboard

== Discography ==
- Peep Show (2000)
- ...Effects of Madness (2002)
