= Saturnalia (The Gutter Twins album) =

Studio album by the Gutter Twins
- Released: March 4, 2008
- Recorded: 2003–2008
- Genre: Alternative rock
- Length: 52:30
- Label: Sub Pop
- Producers: Mathias Schneeberger, Greg Dulli, Mark Lanegan

The Gutter Twins chronology
| Saturnalia (2008) | Adorata (2008) |

Singles from Saturnalia
- 1. "Idle Hands" Released: April 14, 2008; 2. "God's Children" / "Spanish Doors" Released: August 4, 2008

Professional ratings
Review scores
| Source | Rating |
|---|---|
| AllMusic | 4/5 stars |
| Crawdaddy! | (favorable) |
| NME | (7/10) |
| Pitchfork | (7.8/10) |
| The Skinny | 4/5 stars |
| Twisted Ear | 4/5 stars |
| Uncut | 4/5 stars |

Saturnalia is the only studio album by the Gutter Twins, a collaboration between Greg Dulli and Mark Lanegan. The album, which was started as far back as 2003, was released on March 4, 2008. Prior to the album's release, the duo began posting songs on their official MySpace page. Joseph Arthur sings backing vocals on "Idle Hands." The song was also the first single, released April 14, 2008.

== Music ==
=== Recording ===
On Christmas Day 2003, Dulli and Lanegan started recording songs which would become Saturnalia. Lanegan said "It started pretty innocently." In July 2007, Pitchfork announced that the band had signed to Seattle label Sub Pop; soon thereafter, the March 4, 2008 release date was set.

== Saturnalia Tour ==
The Gutter Twins announced a UK tour in May 2008, where they played 6 live concerts around Britain. The band played Oxford Academy (August 11), Nottingham Rescue Rooms (12), London Shepherd's Bush Empire (13), Brighton, Komedia (26), Sheffield, Leadmill (27) and Liverpool, Academy 2 (30).

== Track listing ==
| No. | Title | Writer(s) | Length |
|---|---|---|---|
| 1. | "The Stations" | Dulli, Lanegan | 4:34 |
| 2. | "God's Children" | Dulli | 4:57 |
| 3. | "All Misery/Flowers" | Dulli, Lanegan | 4:23 |
| 4. | "The Body" | Dulli | 3:03 |
| 5. | "Idle Hands" | Dulli, Lanegan | 4:38 |
| 6. | "Circle the Fringes" | Dulli, Lanegan | 5:24 |
| 7. | "Who Will Lead Us?" | Lanegan | 3:49 |
| 8. | "Seven Stories Underground" | Dulli, Lanegan | 3:22 |
| 9. | "I Was in Love with You" | Dulli | 4:25 |
| 10. | "Bête noire" | Lanegan | 3:52 |
| 11. | "Each to Each" | Dulli, Jeff Klein | 4:49 |
| 12. | "Front Street" | Dulli, Lanegan | 5:22 |

== Personnel ==
- Greg Dulli – vocals (all songs), guitar (1, 2, 4, 5, 6, 8, 9, 11, 12), bass (1, 11), organ (1), congas (1), piano (2, 3, 9), drums (3, 9, 10, 11), organ (3), mellotron (4, 5, 6, 11, 12), Rhodes (7, 9, 10, 12)
- Mark Lanegan – vocals (all songs except 9)

=== Guest appearances ===
- Joseph Arthur – vocals (5)
- Norm Block – drums (1, 11)
- David Catching – guitar (12)
- Scott Ford – bass (1, 2, 5, 9, 10), vocals (1, 2)
- Petra Haden – violin (9)
- Jeff Klein – guitar (2, 9, 11), organ (5), programming (11)
- Mario Lalli – bass (6), guitar (10)
- Eddie Nappi – bass (7, 12), drums (7)
- Rick G. Nelson – violin/viola/cello (5, 6)
- Quintron – organ (8)
- Andy Preen – drums/percussion (8)
- Dave Rosser – guitar (2, 5, 6, 9), vocals/bass/lap steel/organ (8), mandolin (11)
- Mathias Schneeberger – guitar (1, 3, 5, 6, 7, 10, 11), organ (1), harmonium (1, 2), bass (3, 4), drums (4), mellotron (11)
- Natasha Shneider – synthesizer/sequencer (11)
- Cully Symington – drums (5, 9)
- Martina Topley-Bird – vocals (4)
- Jen Turner – vocals (5)
- Troy Van Leeuwen – guitar (3, 4, 7)
- Simone Vitucci – cello (1, 9)
- Greg Wieczorek – drums (2, 6, 8), vocals (5), percussion (8)
- Brian Young – drums (12)

== Chart positions ==
| Year | Chart | Position |
|---|---|---|
| 2008 | US Billboard 200 | 117 |
| 2008 | US Top Heatseekers | 3 |
| 2008 | US Top Independent Albums | 16 |
| 2008 | UK Albums Chart | 54 |
| 2008 | Swedish Album Chart | 47 |
| 2008 | Dutch Album Chart | 72 |
| 2008 | Belgian Album Chart | 7 |
