= World Stood Still =

Single by 54 Seconds

from the album Promo 2
- Released: 2001
- Recorded: 2000–2001
- Producer(s): 54 Seconds

54 Seconds singles chronology
"World Stood Still" (2001)	"Ben's Letter" (2001)

"World Stood Still" is a 1997 song performed by Jez Spencer. Lead vocals by Spencer Gibb, Jez Spencer's version was released on 4-Track Mind. It was re-recorded by Gibb's new band 54 Seconds between 2000 and 2001, and released in 2001. It was the first single of the album Promo 2 and also included on that album. The album also included the radio edit of the song.

54 Seconds distributed this song at the 2001 SXSW Music Festival for record industry professionals, press members and fans in attendance.

The band performs this song at Antones on May 25, 2001 with Earl Harvin on drums, that performance was included on Live in Antones May 25. The song was included on compilation Promography.
