= Remind Me Where the Light Is =

Studio album by Great Northern
- Released: April 28, 2009
- Genre: Indie pop Indie rock
- Label: Eenie Meenie Records

Great Northern chronology
| Sleepy Eepee (2008) | Remind Me Where the Light Is (2009) |

Singles from Remind Me Where the Light Is
- 1. "Houses" Released: March 10, 2009

Professional ratings
Aggregate scores
| Source | Rating |
|---|---|
| Metacritic | 59/100 link |
Review scores
| Source | Rating |
| Allmusic | link |
| InYourSpeakers | Positive link |
| Spin | link |

Remind Me Where the Light Is is the second album from the U.S. band Great Northern, released on April 28, 2009, on Eenie Meenie Records.

== Information ==
Wishing to expand their sound, Bixler and Stolte began working with producer Michael Patterson (Beck, Black Rebel Motorcycle Club, Beck, Puff Daddy, She Wants Revenge, amongst others) and Nic Jodoin.

== Track listing ==
| No. | Title | Length |
|---|---|---|
| 1. | "Story" | 3:55 |
| 2. | "Houses" | 4:18 |
| 3. | "Fingers" | 3:52 |
| 4. | "Snakes" | 4:24 |
| 5. | "Stop" | 3:26 |
| 6. | "New Tricks" | 3:21 |
| 7. | "Mountain" | 3:24 |
| 8. | "Warning" | 4:48 |
| 9. | "Driveway" | 4:25 |
| 10. | "Numbers" | 4:52 |
| 11. | "33" | 2:55 |
| 12. | "For Weeks (Japanese bonus track)" |
