= Blackberry Belle =

Studio album by The Twilight Singers
- Released: October 14, 2003
- Recorded: Los Angeles, New Orleans and Memphis
- Genre: Alternative rock, indie rock
- Length: 44:39
- Label: One Little Indian
- Producer: Mike Napolitano, Mathias Schneeberger, Greg Dulli

The Twilight Singers chronology
Black Is the Color of My True Love's Hair (EP) (2003)	Blackberry Belle (2003)	She Loves You (2004)

Singles from Blackberry Belle
- 1. "Teenage Wristband" / "The Killer" Released: November 10, 2003; 2. "Feathers" / "Number Nine" Released: January 26, 2004; 3. "Papillon" Released: August 2, 2004 (promo only)

Professional ratings
Review scores
Source	Rating
AllMusic	4/5 stars
Music Emissions	5/5 stars
Pitchfork Media	(7.7/10)

Blackberry Belle is the second full-length album released by The Twilight Singers. It was released by One Little Indian Records on October 14, 2003, and features guest appearances by Mathias Schneeberger, Alvin Youngblood Hart, Stanton Moore, Petra Haden, Kamasi Washington and Mark Lanegan. The album is a tribute to director Ted Demme, a close friend of Greg Dulli's who died of a heart attack while playing a game of basketball in January 2002. Dulli had been working on another project entitled Amber Headlights (which would later see the light of day in 2005), but abandoned those sessions due to Demme's death. The recordings which followed, fueled in part by the memory of Demme, resulted in Blackberry Belle.

The album was released on vinyl over two years after the initial CD release. Pressed on white vinyl, the LP contained an extra track "Run, Rabbit Run". This is a demo version featuring Greg Dulli on piano. He was known to perform a version of this song on the last The Afghan Whigs tour.

The Twilight Singers performed the album in its entirety for the first and only time in San Francisco at the Great American Music Hall on September 17, 2011, with special guests Mark Lanegan, Petra Haden and Dave Catching joining the group on stage.

== Track listing ==
All songs written by Greg Dulli except as noted.

1. "Martin Eden" – 3:39
2. "Esta noche" – 4:33 (Dulli, Schneeberger)
3. "Teenage Wristband" – 3:34
4. "St. Gregory" – 3:28 (Dulli, Tobias)
5. "The Killer" – 4:28 (Dulli, Phillips)
6. "Decatur St." – 4:10
7. "Papillon" – 4:24
8. "Follow You Down" – 2:24
9. "Feathers" – 4:02
10. "Fat City (Slight Return)" – 3:25
11. "Number Nine" – 6:32
12. "Run, Rabbit Run" (vinyl release only)

== Personnel ==
- Greg Dulli – vocals (all songs), piano (1, 2, 3, 5, 6, 7, 8, 10), guitar (2, 3, 4, 5, 6, 7, 8, 9, 11), keyboards (4, 9), rhodes (5, 8), mellotron (5, 6, 7, 10), drums (10)
- Amay - vocals (9)
- Nikki Crawford - vocals (8)
- Richard Ford - pedal steel (11)
- Scott Ford - bass (1, 2, 7)
- Chris Gray - trumpet (2)
- Petra Haden - vocals (3, 11), violins (11)
- Matt Hergert - drums (5)
- Hoss - drums (3, 11)
- Apollonia Kotero - vocals (3, 10)
- Josh Lampkins - trombone (2)
- Mark Lanegan - vocals (11)
- Stanton Moore - drums (9)
- Steve Myers - vocals (3)
- Mike Napolitano - guitar (6), bass (9)
- Ashlie Philastre - the clap (9)
- Chris Phillips - synth loop (5), drums (5, 6)
- Susan Phillips - the clap (9)
- Mathias Schneeberger - guitar (1, 2, 5), rhodes (1, 2), mellotron (5), piano (7, 9), clavinet (7, 9, 10)
- Jon Skibic - guitars (2, 7, 10, 11), vocals (7), banjo (7)
- Rick Steff - clavinet (6), organ (11)
- Michael Sullivan - bass (3, 4, 5, 6, 8, 10, 11)
- Jesse Tobias - e-bow (3), guitar (4)
- Kamasi Washington - saxophone (2)
- Greg Wieczorek - drums (2, 4, 6, 10), percussion (4, 10), vocals (6)
- Brian Young - drums (1, 7)
- Alvin Youngblood Hart - lapsteel (5)
