= Centuries Before Love and War =

Studio album by Stars of Track and Field
- Released: August 22, 2006
- Genre: Indie rock
- Label: Wind-Up Records
- Producer: Tony Lash; Jeff Stuart Saltzman; Jeffrey Saltzman

Stars of Track and Field chronology
You Came Here for Sunset Last Year (2005)	Centuries Before Love and War (2006)	A Time for Lions (2009)

Professional ratings
Review scores
Source	Rating
Allmusic	4/5 stars
NeuFutur	(7.0/10)

Centuries Before Love and War is an album by Stars of Track and Field. It was released on August 22, 2006, to the iTunes Store and was physically released January 16, 2007. The album's release was delayed due to the band moving from SideCho to Wind-Up Records.

== Track listing ==
1. "Centuries" – 3:05
2. "Movies of Antarctica" – 4:25
3. "With You" – 3:56
4. "Lullaby for a G.I. / Don't Close Your Eyes" – 4:27
5. "Real Time" – 4:07
6. "Arithmatik" – 3:46
7. "U.S. Mile 5" – 3:01
8. "Say Hello" – 3:46
9. "Exit the Recital" – 3:50
10. "Fantastic" – 4:04
