= A Time for Lions =

Studio album by Stars of Track and Field
- Released: September 15, 2009
- Genre: Indie rock
- Length: 40:12
- Label: Wind-Up Records
- Producer: John King; Gregg Wattenberg

Stars of Track and Field chronology
Centuries Before Love and War (2006)	A Time for Lions (2009)

Professional ratings
Review scores
Source	Rating
AbsolutePunk	87% link
Allmusic	link

A Time For Lions is an album by Stars of Track and Field. It was released September 1, 2009 on iTunes and September 15, 2009, physically by Wind-Up Records.

== Track listing ==
All tracks by Kevin Calaba & Jason Bell

1. "Racing Lights" – 3:20
2. "End of All Time" – 3:36
3. "The Breaking of Waves" – 3:28
4. "Now You Lift Your Eyes to the Sun" – 4:26
5. "In Bright Fire" – 3:36
6. "Peeling Away" – 3:19
7. "Through the Static" – 3:20
8. "Safety in Numbers" – 3:32
9. "The Aviator" – 3:27
10. "The Stranger" – 4:50
11. "Sunrise Ends" – 3:29

== Personnel ==
- John Allcastro – engineer
- Jason Bell – producer, engineer
- Jason Bell – engineer
- Kevin Calaba – producer, engineer
- Daphne Chen – violin, viola
- Mathew Cooker – cello
- Victor Florencia – mixing
- Scott Hull – mastering
- Mike Kahn – A&R
- John King – producer
- Tawnee Lillo – French horn
- Darren Majewski – A&R
- Diana Meltzer – A&R
- Brian Montgomery – engineer
- Roger Neill – string arrangements, brass arrangement
- Ross Petersen – producer, engineer
- Todd Sickafoose – bass, double bass
- John Spiker – bass
- Gregg Wattenberg – producer, supervisor, A&R
- Josh Wilbur – engineer
