= Anchorless =

Studio album by Kacy Crowley
- Released: September 23, 1997
- Recorded: ???
- Genre: Alternative Rock
- Length: 53:14
- Label: Atlantic
- Producer: David McNair

Kacy Crowley chronology
Anchorless (1997)	Moodswing (2003)

Professional ratings
Review scores
Source	Rating
Allmusic	2.5/5 stars

Anchorless is Kacy Crowley's major label debut released on Atlantic in 1997. This album had been released as a limited edition indie release in 1996 and was re-released by Atlantic in 1998, subsequently with a different track listing.

== Track listing ==
1. "Hand To Mouthville"
2. "Rebellious"
3. "Bottlecap"
4. "Singers Are Ugly"
5. "Melancholy Bridge"
6. "Vertigo"
7. "Anything"
8. "Nickel To The Stone"
9. "Follow Me Outside"
10. "Scars"
11. "Love Is Close"
12. "Eclipse"

All tracks written by Kacy Crowley except:

- Melancholy Bridge (Kacy Crowley and Billy Harvey)
