= I Love Elke =

Studio album by Johnny Goudie
- Released: June 10, 2003
- Recorded: Summer/Fall 2002
- Genre: Rock
- Label: Strangelove/India
- Producer: Johnny Goudie

Johnny Goudie chronology
18 Unreleased Home Demos 1996-2001 (2002)	I Love Elke (2003)	Boy in a Box (2005)

Professional ratings
Review scores
Source	Rating
Houstonbands.net	(favorable)

I Love Elke is a solo album by Johnny Goudie. Elke refers to 1960s actress Elke Sommer and is a lyric from the song "Open Invitation". The album was originally to be titled "Someone's Trying to Kill Me and This Time, I'm Not Just Saying That to Get Attention". This is the first solo album written, performed, and produced by Johnny Goudie and his first solo release on a record label. The songs "Leave", and "Battle Scar" were later included on the Battle Scar Maxi Single which was released in 2008.

== Track listing ==
1. "Everyone Remembers (When You're Cool)"
2. "Open Invitation"
3. "Old Enough"
4. "Leave"
5. "Back of a Magazine"
6. "Sailor, Go Home"
7. "I am Falling"
8. "Keep it in Bottles"
9. "Battle Scar"
10. "You Are Never Far"

== Additional musicians ==
- Einar Pederson
- Jonas Wilson
- John Constant
