= Kacy Crowley =

American musician and singer-songwriter

- Origin: Northampton, Massachusetts, United States
- Occupation(s): Musician, songwriter
- Instrument(s): Vocals, guitar
- Years active: 1997–present
- Labels: Atlantic Records
- Website: www.kacycrowley.com

Kacy Crowley is an American musician and singer-songwriter. A New England native, she currently resides in Austin, Texas.

== Early life ==
Born in Northampton, Massachusetts, her mother was a piano teacher and her father was a construction worker. Her family soon relocated to Trumbull, Connecticut, where Kacy remained until graduating from high school. Her parents’ passion for music influenced her from an early age. She started playing the guitar soon after seeing John Denver in concert at age 5. She also began taking piano lessons around that time. After graduating high school, she attended the University of Massachusetts Amherst for one semester before dropping out. At 19 she moved out to Los Angeles to try to jumpstart her music career. She played in coffeehouses in and around the Los Angeles area. After two years in Los Angeles, she was struggling with a drug habit and moved back into her parents' house in Connecticut.

== Career ==
With her life back together, she started a band, Tragic Sam, and produced a few sessions with Billy Rush, the former guitarist for Southside Johnny & The Asbury Jukes.

She moved to New York City around 1992 and tried forming a few ensemble groups, without much success. She began waiting tables, while living with then-boyfriend Karl Anderson in a one-bedroom apartment. She devoted whatever free time she had to her music.

Realizing New York City was taking a toll on her, she and Anderson (the two now married) opted to move to Texas, hoping for a fresh start. Once in Austin, she played many open mic nights and would often busk on Sixth Street. She signed a deal with the Dallas-based indie label, Carpe Diem and began recording her debut album Anchorless. The album, which was produced by Dave McNair, was recorded with several local musicians.

After performing at South By Southwest, Kacy signed a deal with Atlantic Records, which brought her music to a wider audience. The label released Anchorless in 1997, including two new tracks on this release. The album received some critical praise from publications such as Billboard, Vanity Fair and USA Today, but many critics had a lukewarm response to the record. Despite the response from critics, her songs were featured in films such as Anywhere but Here and Three to Tango She went out on tour in support of the record, playing at Lilith Fair, the H.O.R.D.E. festival, and Neil Young's Bridge School Benefit as well as opening for artists Chantal Kreviazuk and Marc Cohn.

She went into the studio in 2001 and recorded her second album Boys in the Attic, which was shelved by Atlantic. Kacy soon parted ways with Atlantic and took some time off. She spent the next few years writing and found time to record her third album Moodswing. Released in 2003, the album quickly became a favorite in the Austin area. She released another album entitled Tramps Like Us in 2004.

She released her latest album, "Cave," in the May 2008. In 2010 Kacy joined the band Liars & Saints, which also includes the singer-songwriters Jeremy Nail and Johnny Goudie, and they released an EP in 2011.

== Albums ==
- Anchorless (indie release, limited edition 1996)
- Anchorless (Atlantic Records, 1997)
- Anchorless (remixed edition, 1998)
- Moodswing (indie release, 2003)
- Tramps Like Us (indie release, 2004)
- Cave (indie release, 2008)
- Liars & Saints (indie release, 2011)

== See also ==
- Music of Austin
