= Amber Headlights =

Studio album by Greg Dulli
- Released: September 6, 2005
- Recorded: 2001–2002
- Genre: Alternative rock
- Length: 31:10
- Label: Infernal Recordings
- Producer: Greg Dulli

Greg Dulli chronology
Amber Headlights (2005)	Live at Triple Door (2008)

Professional ratings
Aggregate scores
Source	Rating
Metacritic	55/100
Review scores
Source	Rating
Drowned in Sound	6/10
Pitchfork	4.7/10
PopMatters	5/10 stars

Amber Headlights is an album by Greg Dulli, released in 2005.

== Production ==
In 2001, Dulli started to work on the follow-up to The Twilight Singers' debut album Twilight as Played by The Twilight Singers. However, the death of his close friend Ted Demme in January 2002 led him to decide to start a new project in tribute to Demme that would eventually become Blackberry Belle. The song "Get the Wheel" became "Follow You Down" on Blackberry Belle. Three years later, Dulli decided to release the songs on his own label, Infernal Recordings.

== Critical reception ==
Amber Headlights was met with "mixed or average" reviews from critics. At Metacritic, which assigns a weighted average rating out of 100 to reviews from mainstream publications, this release received an average score of 55 based on 9 reviews.

Billboard wrote that the album "harks back to the denser guitar rock of the Afghan Whigs."

== Track listing ==
1. "So Tight" - 2:57
2. "Cigarettes" - 3:34
3. "Domani" - 3:54
4. "Early Today (And Later That Night)" - 3:34
5. "Golden Boy" - 3:44
6. "Black Swan" - 3:41
7. "Pussywillow" - 3:41
8. "Wicked" - 4:11
9. "Get the Wheel" - 1:54
