= Peep Show (Goudie album) =

Studio album by Goudie
- Released: July 11, 2000
- Genre: Rock
- Label: Elektra/The Music Company
- Producer: Mike McCarthy, Dan McACarroll

Goudie chronology
Peep Show (2000)	Effects of Madness (2002)

Professional ratings
Review scores
Source	Rating
Allmusic	3/5 stars
The Austin Chronicle	2/5 stars
U.S. Music Vault	8/10 stars
CMJ	(favorable)
Barnes & Noble	(favorable)
Houston Press	(favorable)
Texas Monthly	(favorable)
unearthed.com	(favorable)

Peep Show is the debut album by Goudie. It was recorded at Brooklyn Bridge Studio in Austin, Texas. The song "Julia" is the result of a collaboration between Johnny Goudie and Jane Wiedlin of The Go-Go's. The song "When Will You Be Mine" features vocals by Aimee Mann. The album was recorded twice. The initial sessions took place in Los Angeles with producer Fred Maher and featured Lars Ulrich playing drums on "When Will You Be Mine." The band was not satisfied with the result of the Los Angeles sessions, considering the album too glossy and not edgy enough. They returned to Austin, Texas with producer Mike McCarthy, where they recorded the version of the album that would be released.

== Track listing ==
1. "Baby Hello"
2. "Sugar Daddy"
3. "Tonight"
4. "Valentine"
5. "Julia"
6. "Buy Me"
7. "Shy"
8. "Made"
9. "Strange"
10. "Terminal"
11. "Drag City"
12. "When Will You Be Mine?"
