= Stars of Track and Field =

American indie rock band

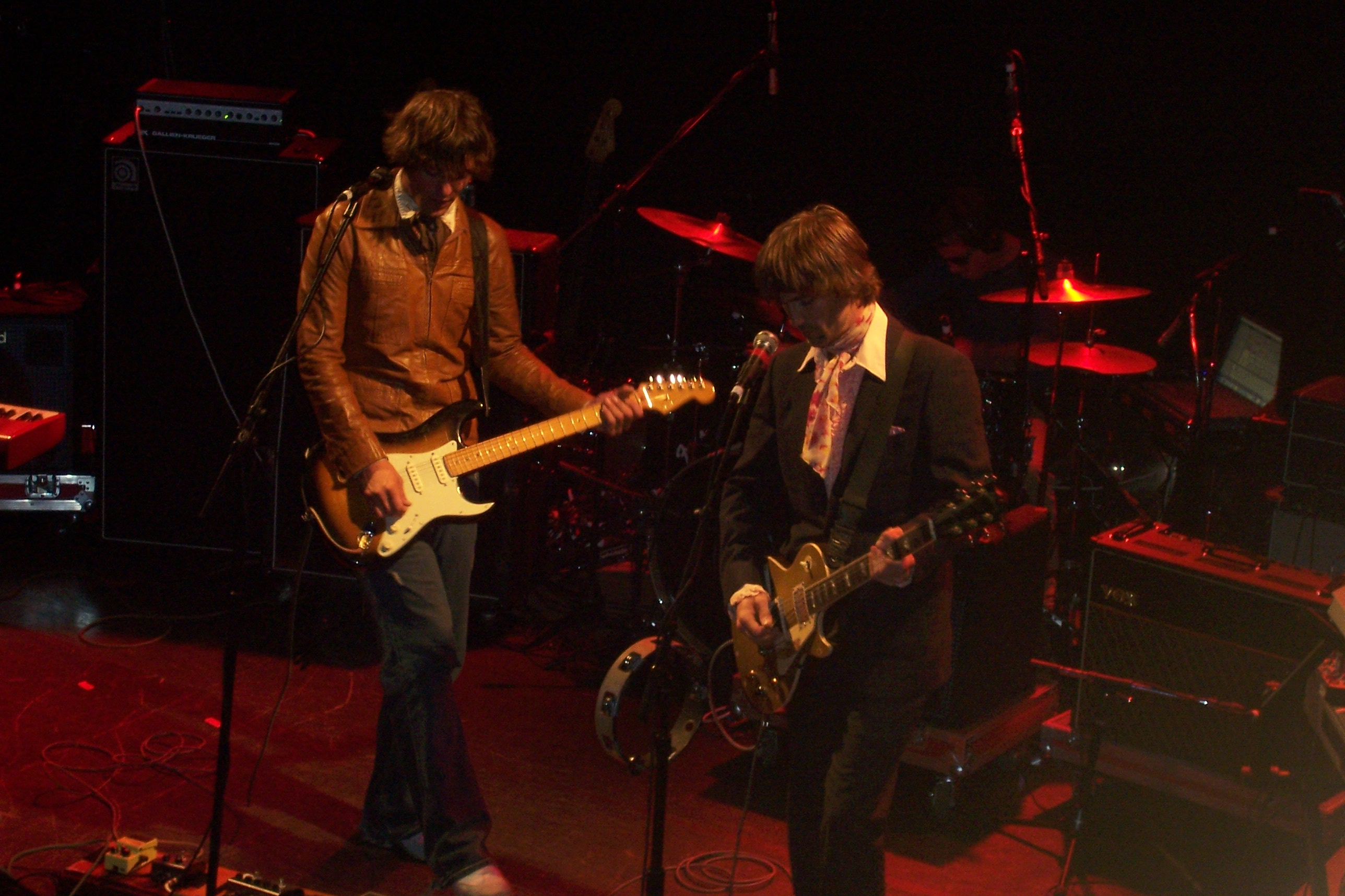
- @ Bowery

Background information
- Origin: Portland, Oregon, United States
- Genres: Indie rock
- Years active: 2003–2011
- Labels: No Logo, Mad, Wind-Up
- Members: Kevin Calaba; Jason Bell; Daniel Orvik
- Past members: Moxley Stratton

Stars of Track and Field was a three-piece indie rock band from Portland, Oregon that was active from 2003 to 2011. They were named after the song "The Stars of Track and Field" by Belle and Sebastian, from the 1996 album If You're Feeling Sinister.

The band released their third album, Centuries Before Love and War, to the iTunes Store in August 2006 and released a physical copy in January 2007. Several tracks from the album are available on the group's MySpace page.

The band was joined by former AC/DC drummer Chris Slade on the DirecTV game show Rock and a Hard Place, hosted by Meat Loaf in which they faced country group Lonestar.

In Fall 2009, they toured with Lights.

Their last album, A Time for Lions, was released in September 2009, with the first single being "Racing Lights". Their song "End Of All Time" was played in an episode of Grey's Anatomy that aired November 12, 2009. A number of their songs appeared on the TV series Greek.

== Band members ==
=== Current lineup ===
- Kevin Calaba – vocals, guitar
- Jason Bell – guitar, vocals
- Daniel Orvik – drums

=== Past members ===
- Moxley Stratton – bass guitar

=== Frequent guest members ===
- Jeff Klein – guitar, piano

== Discography ==
- Stars of Track and Field (2003) on No Logo Records
- You Came Here for Sunset Last Year (2005) on Mad Recordings
- Centuries Before Love and War (2006) on Wind-Up Records
- A Time for Lions (2009) on Wind-Up Records
