= Moodswing (Kacy Crowley album) =

Studio album by Kacy Crowley
- Released: March 30, 2003
- Recorded: ???
- Genre: Alternative Rock
- Label: Independent

Kacy Crowley chronology
Anchorless (1997)	Moodswing (2003)	Tramps Like Us (2004)

Professional ratings
Review scores
Source	Rating
Allmusic	4.5/5 stars

Moodswing is the 2003 album by Kacy Crowley. It was released independently and is popular in Crowley's hometown of Austin, Texas.

== Track listing ==
1. "Everything"
2. "Kind of Perfect"
3. "Unrecovered"
4. "Ashes"
5. "Suspended"
6. "Holding in the World"
7. "Blood"
8. "Church Organ"
9. "Traffic"
10. "Humble Beginnings"
