= Johnny Goudie =

American singer

- Born: October 14, 1968 (age 57)
- Origin: Austin, Texas
- Genres: Rock
- Occupations: Singer-songwriter, guitarist, pianist, producer, actor
- Instruments: vocals, guitar, piano
- Labels: Elektra/Asylum; The Music Company; Propeller Records; F+M; Strangelove; India; Surefire
- Member of: SKYROCKET!, Lady Band Johnson
- Formerly of: The Lossy Coils, Endochine, Goudie, Mr. Rocket Baby, The Little Champions

John Charles Goudie (born October 14, 1968, Coral Gables, Florida) is a Cuban-American singer, songwriter, multi-instrumental musician, record producer, actor, and podcaster based in Austin, Texas. Over his five-decade career, he has received acclaim for his unique vocals and a musical style rooted in classic rock. Goudie has been the recipient of four Austin Music Awards and has fronted several bands including Goudie, Mr. Rocket Baby, Lovetree, Panjandrum, Liars & Saints, and the Little Champions. He has also been a sideman in several other bands, notably Endochine, the Lossy Coils, and Skyrocket.

== Early life and music career ==
Raised in the Miami area, Goudie comes from a family of Cuban medical doctors. In 1982, Johnny saw Cheap Trick in concert, and this experience inspired him to become a musician. Later that year, Goudie started his first band, which he called ZEPHYR. At age 16, Johnny became the guitarist of the band Cry Wolf, the side project of Carole King's guitarist Mark Hallman.

On October 13, 1985, when Johnny was 16, his mother was beaten over the head in her apartment. She died 18 days later. The crime went unsolved for 23 years until a tip led police to arrest his mother's ex-boyfriend. On April 15, 2011, the man was convicted of the murder. Goudie channeled his grief into writing 150 songs in the months following his mother's death.

In 1988, while living outside Houston, Johnny started a funk–soul band called Panjadrum. After Panjadrum broke up in 1990, Goudie formed another band called Lovetree as well as pursued a side career as a solo artist. In 1992 Lovetree recorded an EP entitled Sorry About the Drum Machine. Lovetree's sound was influenced by rock, funk and Latin music.

By 1993, Goudie had left Lovetree and moved to Austin, Texas, where he fronted the rock band Mr. Rocket Baby, which included former members of Panjandrum and Lovetree. Heavily influenced by the power pop bands Jellyfish and the Zombies, Mr. Rocket Baby's philosophy was to play 70s-influenced music while dressing and acting like they were from the 1970s. Their first shows were opening for Davíd Garza and Bob Schneider before crowds of hundreds, and they became an instant hit in Austin, inked a management deal within a week, sold their cars and bought a touring van and hit the road. The band landed a weekly residency at Austin club The Steamboat. In 1993, Mr. Rocket Baby was voted best pop band in the Austin Chronicle's readers poll, and they came in third place in voting for best new band overall. Mr. Rocket Baby released one album, Make Believe, which was produced by Mark Hallman. Mr. Rocket Baby reunited for one concert in 2015.

On April 10, 1994, Johnny married Traci Campbell in Austin. The couple were married for 10 years. Their divorce was the subject of many songs on Goudie's 2005 album, Boy in a Box.

After the breakup of Mr. Rocketbaby, Johnny toured with bassist Einar Pedersen and drummer Kyle Schneider, and the trio self-released an album called Fantastic. In 1996-1997 Johnny played guitar for the band Sunshine and played drums on the album 4-Track Mind with the band Jez Spencer, an early incarnation of Spencer Gibb's band which would become 54 Seconds. He also co-wrote the song "Stuck in a Hole" on Darin Murphy's 1998 album Solitarium as well as co-wrote the song "Sun Earth Moon," which appeared on the Borrowers' second album Overcoming Gravity and was also featured in a commercial for the Cleveland Planetarium.

== Goudie 1997–2002 ==
In Spring 1998, Johnny's new band, simply named Goudie, played the South by Southwest festival in Austin. Goudie was the second band signed to the record label The Music Company, a subsidiary of Elektra Records, and a vanity label formed by Metallica drummer Lars Ulrich.

In July 2000, Goudie released its first album Peep Show. In June 2001 the band left Elektra and joined friends at independent Austin label India Records, which released the band's second album ...Effects of Madness in March 2002. However, later that year, the band split up.

== Post-Goudie career ==
Following the breakup of his band, Johnny returned to writing and recording songs in his home studio. He independently released an album of self-recorded demos entitled 18 Unreleased Home Demos 1996-2001 as well as a Christmas album Johnny Says Ho, which was released only to his fan club. These releases led to a series of other demo collections entitled Return of the Handlebar, I Think I'm a Genius, Electric Boogalo, Helloprah! and The Loyalist; the latter consisted entirely of covers.

He appeared on Eliza Gilkyson's 2002 album Lost and Found, Colin Gilmore's album The Day the World Stopped and Spun the Other Way, and Jeff Klein's 2003 album Everybody Loves a Winner. He continued to write his own material and in Summer 2003 he released a solo album entitled I Love Elke on Strangelove Records, a label dedicated to artists making records on their own terms. Johnny also co-wrote the song "Intertwined" which appeared on Canvas's 2004 album Four Days Awake.

He was voted best keyboard player in the 2004 Austin Chronicle music awards for his work with the band Endochine on their nationwide tour supporting their album Day Two.

Goudie also produced albums for scores of local bands and musicians. In 2004 Johnny produced Canvas's third album Painting the Roses. On the subsequent tour for Painting the Roses, Johnny played as opening act with Canvas as his backing band, and then played keyboard with Canvas during their headlining set. Goudie also played several acoustic shows with Canvas frontman Joseph King and was briefly a member of King's post-Canvas band which became Deadbeat Darling. In 2007, along with Stephen Doster, Goudie co-produced Stefanie Fix's album Crooked Smile.

Later in 2004 Johnny played on Pale's album Here in addition to completing his second solo album Boy in a Box, which was the debut release of F+M Records. The tracks "Back of a Magazine" and "Everyone Remembers (When You're Cool)" from Boy in a Box were included on the soundtrack of the 2006 short film Surf Gang. 2006 also saw the release of Johnny's acoustic album All You Can't Undo, which he supported with a nationwide acoustic tour with Taylor Davis. While on tour, Goudie and Davis met singer/songwriter Shwa Losben, and the three recorded an album titled Chop Chop. In 2007 Johnny joined long-time friend Ian Moore's band, the Lossy Coils, on a nationwide tour in support of their album To Be Loved. In 2003, Johnny joined the cover band K-Tel Hit Machine, which was later renamed "SKYROCKET!" The band features several of the best players from the Austin music scene and won two Austin Music Awards.

In addition to being a member of the Lossy Coils and SKYROCKET!, Johnny still plays live shows as a solo artist, and has assembled a band titled Johnny Goudie and the Little Champions, which includes Brad Byrum (bass) and Scott Thomas (drums) of Canvas and Ryan Holley (lead guitar) and Sweeney Tidball (keyboard). The band released its debut album El Payaso on February 3, 2009. Johnny's backing band has featured a revolving door of local musicians, including at times an all-female lineup featuring such stars as Dominique Davalos, Kathy Valentine and Savannah Welch. The band's name evolved from "Johnny Goudie and the Lady Champions" to "Johnny in the Ladies Room" to "Lady Band Johnson".

Johnny co-wrote the song "Broken" with Rachel Loy and Sara Hickman for the 2010 album Absence Of Blame. Johnny formed the band Liars & Saints along with fellow singer-songwriters Jeremy Nail and Kacy Crowley, and released an album in 2011.

Goudie played in Kathy Valentine's bands the Impossible and the Bluebonnets, and, in 2014, he recorded an EP with Valentine on which he co-wrote two of the songs.

In 2014, he played guitar, piano, organ slide and sang harmonies on Kimmie Rhodes' album Cowgirl Boudoir. The album also includes a cover version of the song "I Am Falling", which Goudie wrote (the original version appeared on his 2003 album I Love Elke). In late 2014, Goudie also provided backing vocals on Paco Estrada's album Bedtime Stories.

In January 2018, he entered the studio to record a solo EP with producer "Scrappy" Jud Newcomb. The EP, entitled "Leper Hands", was released September 13, 2018.

In 2021, he began releasing new singles each month. So far he has released the songs "Marigolds", "All New Flavor", and a new version of "Sun Earth Moon".

== Podcast ==
In 2011 Johnny started broadcasting a podcast entitled "How Did I Get Here?" in which he interviews fellow musicians and people in the entertainment industry. As of October 2020, he has recorded over 1,200 episodes. The podcast was the 2019 Austin Chronicle Critics Pick in the category of politics and media.

== Selected discography ==
Year	Group	Title	Label
1990	Panjadrum	Chuck	
1992	Lovetree	Sorry About the Drum Machine	
1994	Mr. Rocket Baby	Make Believe	Crystal Clear
1994	Mr. Rocket Baby	Homegroan Volume 1	KROX
1994	Mr. Rocket Baby	Local Licks Live '94	KLBJ
1994	Mr. Rocket Baby	Tales from the Edge Volume Nine & Ten	KDGE
1996	Johnny Goudie Trio	Fantastic	Propeller Records
2004	Johnny Goudie	I Think I'm a Genius	
2004	Johnny Goudie	The Loyalist	
2004	Johnny Goudie	Helloprah	
1997	Johnny Goudie Trio	Rotating Parts: A Propeller Collection	Propeller Records
1997	Jez Spencer	4-Track Mind	
1998	Johnny Goudie Trio	Do Me Baby! - Austin Does Prince	
2000	Goudie	Peep Show	TMC/Elektra
2000	Goudie	ASCAP's EAR Volume 3	ASCAP
2001	Johnny Goudie	Johnny Says Ho	
2002	Goudie	Effects of Madness	India
2002	Johnny Goudie	18 Unreleased Home Demos 1996-2001	
2003	Johnny Goudie	I Love Elke	Strangelove
2003	Canvas	Four Days Awake	Desert Tide
2003	Daniel Kang	I Wish I could See You	
2002	Eliza Gilkyson	Lost and Found	Red House Records
2003	Jeff Klein	Everybody Loves a Winner	
2004	God Drives a Galaxy	Pale Blue Dot	
2004	Colin Gilmore	The Day the World Stopped	
2004	Pale	Here	
2005	Johnny Goudie	Boy in a Box	F+M
2006	Saturday's Radar	Kill All the Dj's	National Records
2006	Johnny Goudie	All You Can't Undo	
2006	Johnny Goudie	Surf Gang Soundtrack	
2008	Shwa Losben	Chop Chop	
2008	Johnny Goudie and the Little Champions	Seachange Compilation	Seachange Records
2008	Johnny Goudie and the Little Champions	Battle Scar Maxi Single	Seachange Records
2009	Johnny Goudie and the Little Champions	El Payaso	Seachange Records
2011	Liars & Saints	Liars & Saints	
2012	Various Artists	Austin Christmas	Same Sky
2014	Kimmie Rhodes	Cowgirl Boudoir	Sunbird Records
2015	Kathy Valentine	Solo EP	
2015	Paco Estrada	Bedtime Stories	Reckless Love, LLC
2016	Jeremy Nail	My Mountain	
2018	Johnny Goudie	Leper Hands	

== Selected filmography ==
Year	Title	Role
1999	A Slipping-Down Life	Jesse
2007	A Very Bad Day	Officer Shumanski

== Television roles ==
Year	Title	Role	Notes
2002	Going to California	Band Member (with Jerry O'Connell)	Episode: "Searching For Eddie Van Halen"
