= Jeremy Nail =

American singer-songwriter

Jeremy Nail is an American singer-songwriter and guitarist. He was born in Albany, Texas and is based in Austin.

Nail played guitar and wrote songs in several bands including Dustin Welch, The Sideshow Tragedy and Liars and Saints (with Johnny Goudie and Kacy Crowley). His debut album Letter (2007) was described by the Austin Chronicle as “a diverse, gripping listen, one that's centered around his ability to capture waking moments with intensity. Nail's visions take shape with a self-confidence by a local singer-songwriter that hasn't been displayed on a first effort since Jeff Klein.”

Nail played guitar for Alejandro Escovedo in 2013. After playing one show together, at the Norman Music Festival in Norman, OK, Escovedo asked Nail to join him on his upcoming world tour. Shortly thereafter, Nail was diagnosed with sarcoma, a rare soft tissue cancer that had wrapped around his left leg over the course of four months. After radiation therapy and other treatment, culminating in the amputation of Nail's leg, Nail survived.

In 2015, Escovedo helped Nail to develop new songs, and produced his new record, My Mountain (2016), accompanied by Chris Masterson and Eleanor Whitmore aka The Mastersons, Bobby Daniel, Chris Searles, Dana Falconberry and Jazz Mills. Elmore Magazine premiered Nail's first official video for the title track, and wrote that "Nail’s sound is superbly profound, dancing along the lines of Ryan Bingham and a Stetson-clad Beck.". My Mountain received international raves and the Austin-American Statesman named Nail the Artist of the Month for May 2016. Music writer Peter Blackstock invited Jeremy Nail and his band to perform one of the tunes, "Survive", from his new record, My Mountain, which was videotaped in the studio at the Austin American-Statesman, as part of the Austin 360’s artist of the month series. Blackstock described "Survive" as "perhaps the most moving song on “My Mountain.” Its magic is in its subtlety." My Mountain was nominated by the 15th Annual Independent Music Awards in the Alt-Country album category.

Jeremy Nail went on to co-produce his next release 'Live Oak' with drummer Pat Manske in 2018. Kevin Curtin at the Austin Chronicle premiered the first official video "Abiquiu", which is the first track on Live Oak. Curtin wrote, "Pastoral and poetic, the new album – arriving August 17 – finds the native Texan from Albany ever reflective and resilient, breathing in life’s landscapes, literal and figurative, and exhaling a peaceful sense of place." Austin 360 exclusively premiered a first listen of 'Live Oak'. "One constant that extends from “My Mountain” to his new “Live Oak,” is the prominence of the natural world in the songs Nail writes. The mountains and oceans that loomed large on the last record give way to desert flowers and sturdy trees, which provide a graceful path in to the new record." Peter Blackstock

== Discography ==
- Letter (2007)
- EP Jeremy Nail & The Incidents (2009)
- My Mountain (2016)
- Live Oak (2018)
