= The Gutter Twins =

American alternative rock band

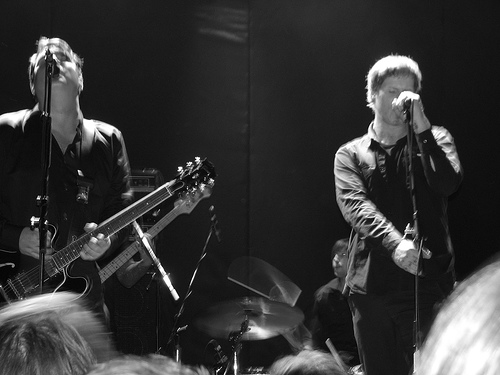
- The Gutter Twins at The Bowery Ballroom in 2008. From left: Greg Dulli, Mark Lanegan.

Background information
- Origin: Los Angeles, United States
- Genre: Alternative rock
- Years active: 2003–2011
- Label: Sub Pop
- Past members: Greg Dulli; Mark Lanegan (deceased); Dave Rosser (deceased); Scott Ford; Jeff Klein; Cully Symington
- Website: www.theguttertwins.com

The Gutter Twins was a musical collaboration between rock musicians Greg Dulli and Mark Lanegan. Dulli and Lanegan had regularly contributed to each other's projects since 2000, most notably in Dulli's Twilight Singers; of the duo's origins, Dulli said "I think Mark told a journalist we were doing it, and then the journalist called me, and I didn't know we were doing it." On Christmas Day 2003, Dulli and Lanegan began work on the collaboration. Their name is a punning homage to the Glimmer Twins, the pseudonym used by Mick Jagger and Keith Richards for work producing recordings by the Rolling Stones.

== History ==
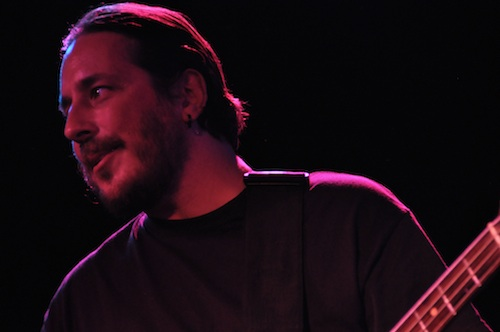
Bass player Scott Ford - live in concert

=== Saturnalia (2008–09) ===
In July 2007, the music website Pitchfork Media announced that the duo, "two of the alt-rock era's greatest frontmen," had signed to Seattle label Sub Pop. Soon thereafter, Sub Pop reported a March 4, 2008 release date for their debut album Saturnalia.

The Gutter Twins appeared with their backup band on the Late Show with David Letterman on March 20, 2008, and toured the album throughout the USA and Europe during the year. Critical response to the album was consistently positive; Blast magazine called it "an audial descent into the dark emotions that often lurk beneath the surface" and that "the haunting 'God’s Children' sounds like it was penned by U2’s long-lost cousin from Seattle" and Uncut said "with Lanegan at his stentorian best and Dulli in full confessional mode, Saturnalia is a feast, certainly – but one where the dishes are served delightfully raw."

In September 2008, the Gutter Twins released the EP Adorata through iTunes. It features two original songs and cover versions of songs by José González, Primal Scream, Scott Walker, Vetiver, and Eleven. A portion of Adorata’s proceeds will go to the Natasha Shneider Memorial Fund. Shneider was a friend of the band and the late lead singer of Eleven.

In January 2009, the Gutter Twins toured as a duet, backed by guitarist Dave Rosser (who also sings lead vocals on "Tennessee Waltz"). The set list includes songs for both their albums, acoustic versions of some tracks from their previous bands and a few covers. They usually segue "God's Children" into Bob Dylan's "All Along the Watchtower", jokingly acknowledging the obvious melodic similarities between their own song and Dylan's. "Stations" is also occasionally started with a short quote from the intro of "Stairway to Heaven", which Dulli states is his favorite song of all time.

In February 2022, it was announced that Lanegan had died, at the age of 57.

== Discography ==
=== Studio albums ===
Year	Title	Peak chart position					
Year	Title	US	BEL	IRE	NLD	SWE	UK
2008	Saturnalia: Released: March 4, 2008; Label: Sub Pop (SP #70761); Formats: CD, LP	117	7	60	72	47	54

=== Extended plays ===
Year	Title
2008	Adorata: Released: September 2, 2008; Label: Sub Pop (SP #45932); Formats: CD

=== Singles ===
Year	Title
2008	"Idle Hands"
2008	"God's Children"

=== Music videos ===
Year	Title
2008	"All misery/Flowers"
2008	"Idle Hands"
