= Adorata =

EP by the Gutter Twins
- Released: September 2, 2008
- Recorded: 2003–2008
- Genre: Alternative rock
- Length: 33:03
- Label: Sub Pop
- Producers: Greg Dulli, Mark Lanegan

The Gutter Twins chronology
| Saturnalia (2008) | Adorata (2008) |

Professional ratings
Review scores
| Source | Rating |
|---|---|
| Pitchfork | 5.3/10 |
| The Skinny | 4/5 stars |

Adorata is the only EP by the Gutter Twins, released initially as an iTunes exclusive on September 2, 2008. Within a couple of weeks, Adorata was released in DRM-free, 320 kbit/s MP3, a superior audio quality in comparison to iTunes, through the Sub Pop Records website. The EP was mostly recorded during sessions for their first album, Saturnalia. This is the band's last album before the band's dissolution in 2011.

== Track listing ==
| | Song | Length | Composer(s) | Info |
|---|---|---|---|---|
| 01. | "Belles" | 4:30 | Cabic | Originally released by Vetiver in 2004 on the Vetiver album |
| 02. | "Down the Line" | 4:10 | González | Originally released by José González in 2007 on the In Our Nature album |
| 03. | "Deep Hit of Morning Sun" | 4:43 | Gillespie, Young, Mounfield, Duffy, Innes, Mooney | Originally released by Primal Scream in 2002 on the Evil Heat album |
| 04. | "Flow Like a River" | 4:05 | Johannes, Shneider, Irons | Originally released by Eleven in 2003 on the Howling Book album |
| 05. | "St. James Infirmary" | 3:48 | Traditional | Also recorded by Isobel Campbell & Mark Lanegan in 2005 for the Ramblin' Man EP |
| 06. | "Duchess" | 2:40 | Walker | Originally released by Scott Walker in 1969 on the Scott 4 album |
| 07. | "Spanish Doors" | 4:10 | Lanegan, Dulli | Previously unreleased original the Gutter Twins song |
| 08. | "We Have Met Before" | 5:01 | Lanegan, Dulli | Previously unreleased original the Gutter Twins song |
