= Trading Twilight for Daylight =

Trading Twilight For Daylight

Studio album by Great Northern
- Released: May 15, 2007
- Genre: Indie pop, indie rock
- Length: 43:24
- Label: Eenie Meenie
- Producer: Mathias Schneeberger

Great Northern chronology
Trading Twilight For Daylight (2007)	Sleepy Eepee (2008)

Professional ratings
Review scores
Source	Rating
AbsolutePunk.net	71%
Allmusic	3.5/5 stars
IGN Music	7.2/10
Stylus magazine	C+

Trading Twilight for Daylight is the first full-length album from the American band Great Northern. It was recorded in Mathias Schneeberger's "Donner & Blitzen" studio in Arcadia, California.

== Track listing ==
No.	Title	Length
1.	"Our Bleeding Hearts"	3:46
2.	"Just a Dream"	5:44
3.	"Home"	3:49
4.	"Telling Lies"	3:37
5.	"Low Is a Height"	5:15
6.	"City of Sleep"	4:40
7.	"A Sun a Sound"	3:59
8.	"Into the Sun"	4:23
9.	"The Middle"	3:09
10.	"Babies"	5:02

Bonus Tracks
No.	Title	Length
11.	"Winter"	2:00
12.	"Loose Ends"	4:19
13.	"This Is a Problem"	4:41
14.	"Summertime"	4:57
15.	"Radio"	3:03
16.	"Shakey"	3:51
