= Kenneth E. Parris III =

American painter (born 1975)

Kenneth E. Parris III (born 1975 in Philadelphia, Pennsylvania) is a New York visual artist and creative director. He received his BFA in illustration and an AAS in graphic design at the Rochester Institute of Technology.

His paintings and installations have been critically acclaimed by a number of publications and media including the Walker Art Center online magazine, National Public Radio, Time Out New York and Trend Hunter.

Parris traveled on the final two-year world tour with The Merce Cunningham Dance Company where he created an original series of drawings and text titled "Drawing Dance" for The New York Times. This series was featured for 23 weeks on the ArtsBeat blog and culminated in an exhibition made possible in part through a Space Grant awarded from Chashama. Parris continued drawing the series from reference photographs and expanded it to include mixed media paintings which were shown in multiple art galleries and venues in New York City, Houston, Philadelphia, and at Jacob's Pillow during the Summer dance festival.

Through a collaboration with the American Emo band Mineral, Parris designed and art directed their 2019 retrospective book and album titled, One Day When We Are Young.

Parris collaborated with former Merce Cunningham dancer and Pam Tanowitz Dance Company artistic associate, rehearsal director, and dancer Melissa Toogood and sister Jodie Toogood on a multi-disciplinary performance piece titled SET A|PART described as “a joy to watch as it turned into Art in motion” by Kym Vaitiekus for Broadway World.

To commemorate Merce Cunningham’s Centennial, the 92nd Street Y (92Y) hosted a Harkness Dance Festival Conversation about Parris’s collaboration with the Merce Cunningham Dance Company featuring him and former company members: Kimberly Bartosik, Dylan Crossman, Douglas Dunn, and Melissa Toogood. Vail Valley Foundation brought a selection of his work to Vail, Colorado, as well as facilitated the reproduction of works on outdoor displays throughout the village during Vail International Dance Festival in 2019.

Parris has taught and lectured at the Miami Ad School in New York.

For The One Club, Parris was on a lecture panel about Living A Creative Life during the Here Are All The Black People conference in New York City (2014).

He was a recipient of a studio artist grant in Chashama’s Work Space Program from 2012 to 2021.

Parris primarily lives and works in Sydney, Australia.
