= Sleepy Eepee =

EP by Great Northern
- Released: March 18, 2008
- Genre: Alternative rock, indie rock
- Length: 17:51
- Label: Eenie Meenie

Great Northern chronology
Trading Twilight for Daylight (2007)	Sleepy Eepee (2008)	Remind Me Where The Light Is (2009)

Sleepy Eepee is an EP by American band Great Northern. The songs were originally released as a special b-side disc as part of the band's debut album, Trading Twilight for Daylight, and only sold at live shows, but due to high demand, they were re-released as an EP in 2008. The album was recorded in 2003–2004 and mixed in 2006. Former bassist Ashley Dzerigian and former drummer Davey Latter were still part of the recording.

== Track listing ==
No.	Title	Length
1.	"Loose Ends"	4:19
2.	"This Is a Problem"	4:41
3.	"Summertime"	4:57
4.	"Radio"	3:03
5.	"Shakey"	3:51
