= Tramps Like Us (album) =

Studio album by Kacy Crowley
- Released: March 8, 2004
- Genre: Alternative Rock
- Label: Independent

Kacy Crowley chronology
Moodswing (2003)	Tramps Like Us (2004)

Professional ratings
Review scores
Source	Rating
Allmusic	3.5/5 stars

Tramps Like Us is the 2004 album by Kacy Crowley. It was released independently. Like her previous album, Moodswing, it is popular in Crowley's hometown of Austin, Texas.

== Track listing ==
1. "Badass"
2. "Barely Hanging On"
3. "Nameless Town"
4. "Sinners Hallelujah"
5. "Holding in the World"
6. "Goddamn Angel"
7. "Downtime"
8. "Kimberly"
9. "Breakdown Lane"
10. "Paydirt"
11. "Boss"
