= Jeff Klein =

American singer-songwriter

- Born: Jeffrey Lawrence Klein
- Origin: Newburgh, New York, USA
- Genres: Indie rock
- Occupations: Singer, songwriter, musician
- Instruments: Vocals, guitar, piano
- Years active: 2000–present
- Labels: One Little Indian Records, Island Def Jam, Razor & Tie
- Website: www.thejeffklein.com

Jeffrey Lawrence Klein is an American singer-songwriter of the band My Jerusalem from Newburgh, New York, who plays keyboards and guitar. He has released three solo albums and another three albums with My Jerusalem. Jeff Klein has risen to acclaim after the release of his album 'Everybody Loves A Winner' which gave him the necessary critical acclaim in the beginning and provided him with an international reach towards some few parts of every continent.

== Biography ==
At the age of 18, Klein moved to Boston to attend the Berklee College of Music. In 1999, he moved to Austin, Texas and released his first album, You'll Never Get to Heaven If You Break My Heart. Signing to the influential Bjork record label One Little Indian, Klein released two more albums, Everybody Loves a Winner, featuring Patty Griffin, Matthew Ryan, Jon Dee Graham and Johnny Goudie, in 2002, and The Hustler, which features Ani Difranco and Dave Pirner of Soul Asylum as guests in 2005. The formation of his band My Jerusalem happened in (2009) where he would go on to release three albums between 2010 and 2016.

He has also worked with Ani DiFranco and The Twilight Singers, and as of 2008 was touring with The Gutter Twins as keyboardist. He has been described as "Tom Waits snagged on a barbedwire fence." and as having a "smoky voice (with a) bruised world-weariness".

Klein is also the main member of the collective My Jerusalem, along with fellow Gutter Twins musicians Cully Symington and Dave Rosser.

Along with a history of collaborating with Greg Dulli and Mark Lanegan, Klein has toured or guested as a member of bands such as The Honorary Title, Stars of Track and Field, Ed Harcourt, and Statistics

Jeffrey Klein has collaborated with visual artist Kenneth E. Parris III

Jeffrey Klein has had many songs featured in Film and TV, including an international breakthrough after having the song 'Death Valley' from his latest 2013 album 'Preachers' featured on the 4th episode of Suits in its Sixth Season. The soundtrack put Jeffrey Klein on the international map where he has grown a fanbase from Canada, USA, Spain and the UK. The show made a hit in Eastern Asia which in return has given Jeffrey Klein a decent following from countries such as Japan, South Korea and most notably from the East, India.

== Discography ==
=== Solo albums ===
- You'll Never Get to Heaven If You Break My Heart (India, 2000)
- Everybody Loves A Winner (One Little Indian, 2003)
- The Hustler (One Little Indian, 2005)
- Death of the Fox (Island Def Jam, 2010)

=== Singles ===
- "Another Breakdown" (One Little Indian, 2003)

=== My Jerusalem ===
- A Little Death (Concord Music Group, 2016)
- Preachers (The End Records, 2012)
- Gone For Good (One Little Indian, 2010)

=== Appears on ===
- Folk Uke - "Small One" (The Orchard (company), 2020)
- Ximena Sariñana – No Todo lo Puedes Dar (Warner, 2014)
- Ani DiFranco – Red Letter Year (Righteous Babe Records, 2008)
- Greg Dulli And Friends – Live at Triple Door (Infernal Recordings, 2008)
- Gutter Twins – Adorata (Sub Pop, 2008)
- Gutter Twins – Saturnalia (Sub Pop, 2008)
- Zookeeper – Becoming All Things (Belle City Pop, 2007)
- The Honorary Title – Scream And Light Up The Sky (Reprise, 2007)
- Twilight Singers – Stitch in Time (One Little Indian, 2006)
- Mundy – Raining Down Arrows (Camcor, 2004)
- The Honorary Title – Honorary Title (Doghouse, 2003)
- Eliza Gilkyson – Lost And Found (Red House, 2002)
- Jason Karaban – "Doomed to Make Choices" (Ascend Records, 2006)
