= Twilight as Played by The Twilight Singers =

Studio album by The Twilight Singers
- Released: September 12, 2000
- Genre: Rock
- Length: 46:53
- Label: Columbia
- Producer: Greg Dulli, Fila Brazillia

The Twilight Singers chronology
Twilight as Played by The Twilight Singers (2000)	Black Is the Color of My True Love's Hair (EP) (2003)

Professional ratings
Review scores
Source	Rating
AllMusic	3/5 stars
The Encyclopedia of Popular Music	3/5 stars
Entertainment Weekly	B−

Twilight as Played by The Twilight Singers is the first album by The Twilight Singers, released by Columbia Records in 2000.

== Critical reception ==
The Washington Post wrote that "the hushed, claustrophobic approach to soul music recalls the spooky divorce albums by Marvin Gaye (1978's Here, My Dear) and Smokey Robinson (1984's Essar), even if [Greg] Dulli's melodies aren't quite as grabbing."

== Track listing ==
All tracks composed by Greg Dulli; except where indicated

1. "The Twilite Kid" - 5:52
2. "That's Just How That Bird Sings" (Greg Dulli, Harold Chichester) - 3:52
3. "Clyde" (Greg Dulli, Harold Chichester, Shawn Smith) - 4:40
4. "King Only" - 3:07
5. "Love" - 3:21
6. "Annie Mae" (Greg Dulli, Steve Cobby, David McSherry) - 2:20
7. "Verti-Marte" - 5:09
8. "Last Temptation" (Greg Dulli, Steve Cobby, David McSherry) - 3:26
9. "Railroad Lullaby" - 3:13
10. "East 17th" - 1:01
11. "Into the Street" (Greg Dulli. Harold Chichester) - 4:55
12. "Twilight" - 5:57
