= Dave Rosser =

- Born: August 3, 1966; Gadsden, Alabama
- Origin: New Orleans, Louisiana
- Died: June 27, 2017 (aged 50) New Orleans, Louisiana
- Genres: Alternative rock
- Occupation: Guitarist

Dave Rosser was an American rock guitarist known for his work for the Afghan Whigs, who he joined in 2012. He played guitar on their albums Do to the Beast and In Spades. Previously, he was a member of the Gutter Twins and the Twilight Singers, projects started by Whigs frontman Greg Dulli.

== Musical career ==
In addition to performing with the Afghan Whigs, Gutter Twins, and Twilight Singers, Rosser contributed his guitar playing to albums by Ani DiFranco, Gal Holiday & the Honky Tonk Revue, My Jerusalem, Joseph Arthur, and Tim Heidecker, among others. He also had a band of his own known as Get Busy and co-founded the innovative New Orleans music experience known as Kirasu (www.kirasumusic.com).

When he wasn't touring around the globe, he played in bars and nightclubs on Bourbon Street in the heart of the French Quarter. He sat in with and subbed for his friends in several bands, including Category 5, RTL, The Remedy and No Quarter.

== Death ==
Rosser died in New Orleans, Louisiana on June 27, 2017, at the age of 50. He had been diagnosed with inoperable colon cancer the previous year, and the Afghan Whigs organized two shows (one in Los Angeles, the other in New Orleans) to raise money for his medical bills. Performers at the New Orleans show included the Whigs, Mark Lanegan, Ani DiFranco, and Morning 40 Federation.
