= Greg Dulli =

American musician

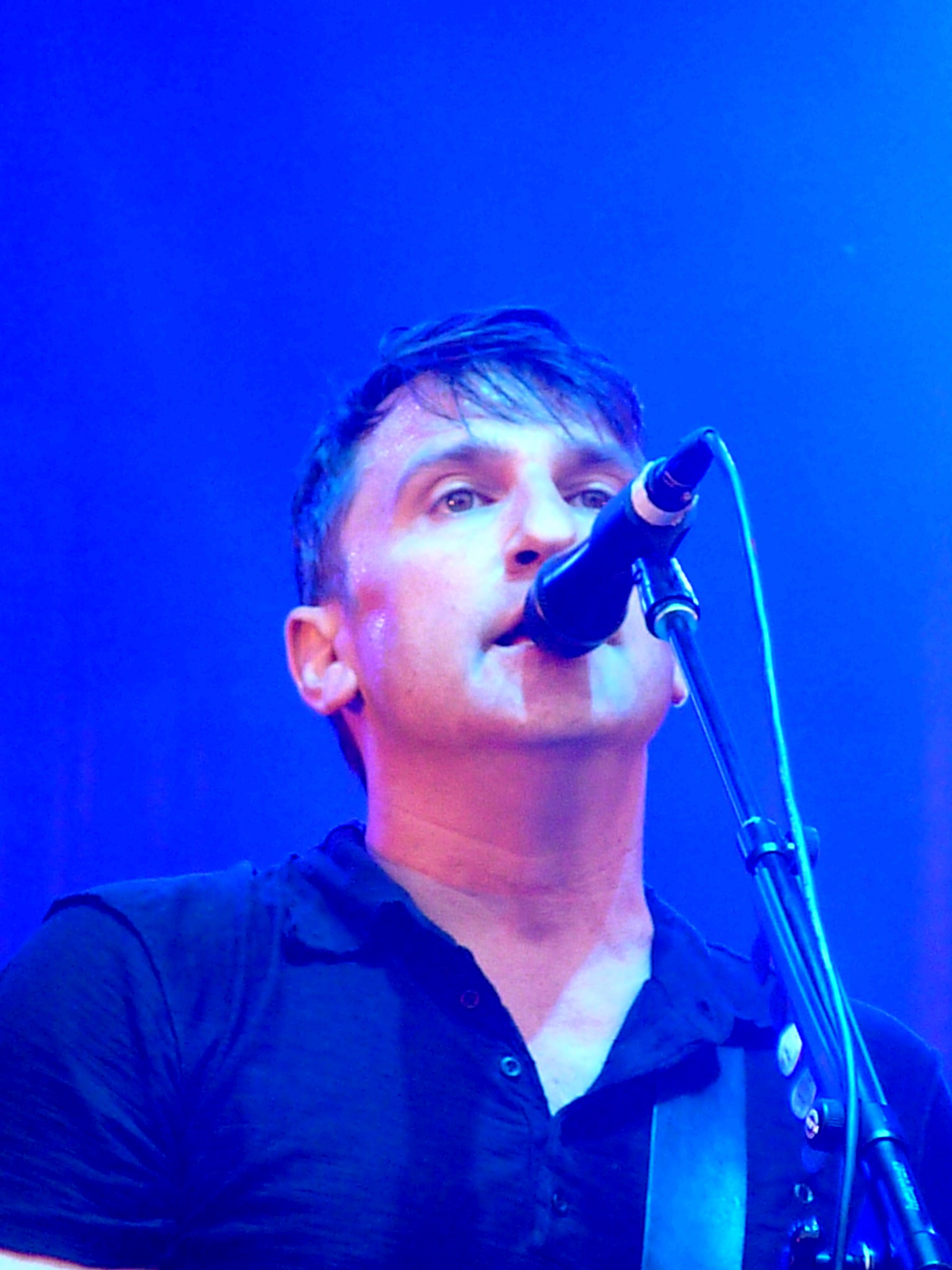
- Dulli performing at Primavera Sound in Barcelona in 2012.

Background information
- Born: May 11, 1965 (age 60)
- Origin: Hamilton, Ohio, US
- Genres: Rock, alternative rock, grunge, indie rock
- Years active: 1987–present
- Member of: The Afghan Whigs, The Twilight Singers
- Formerly of: The Gutter Twins

Greg Dulli (born May 11, 1965) is an American musician from Hamilton, Ohio. Debuting as a member of the rock band the Afghan Whigs in 1986, Dulli has been a member of the Twilight Singers, Gutter Twins, and in 2020 released his debut solo album, Random Desire. Dulli is known as the voice of John Lennon in the 1994 film Backbeat, and has produced music for musicians such as Afterhours, and is known as a regular collaborator of Mark Lanegan and Joseph Arthur.

== Early life ==
Dulli grew up in Hamilton, Ohio. In 1983, he studied film at the University of Cincinnati, but later dropped out after a year and a half, moving to Los Angeles and working at Tower Records on Sunset Boulevard while attempting to become an actor. Inspired to become a musician by the band the Dream Syndicate, Dulli moved back to Cincinnati and formed a band called the Black Republicans.

== Career ==
=== 1986–2001: The Afghan Whigs ===
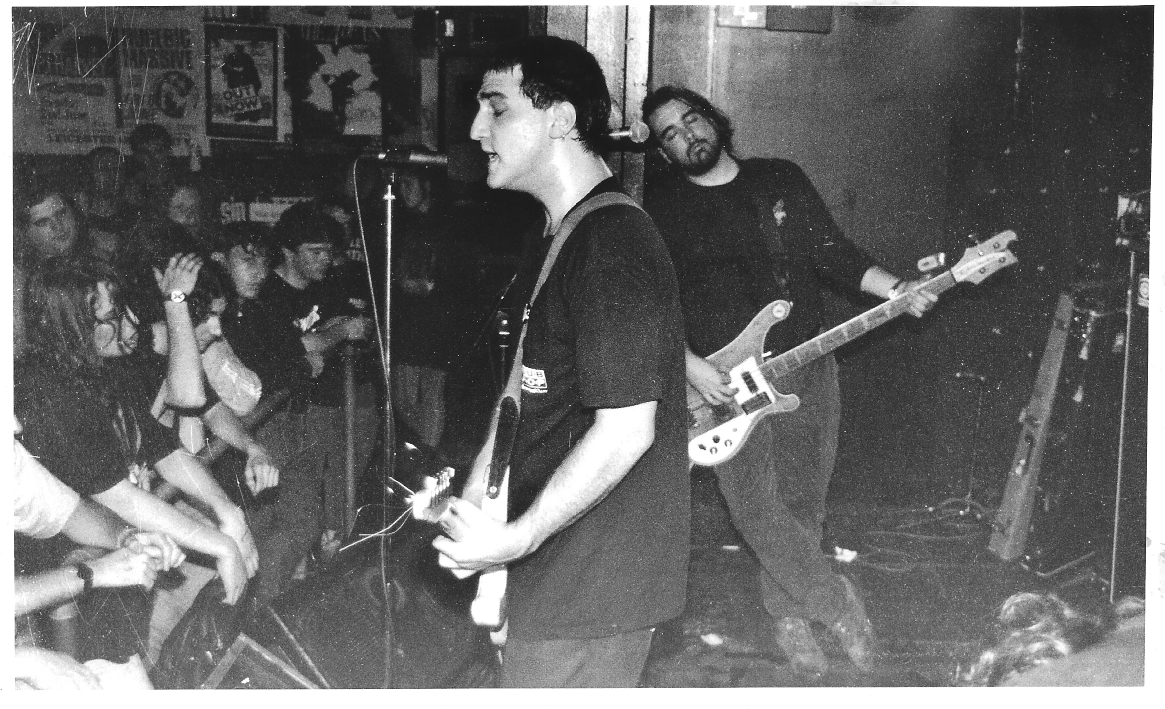
The Afghan Whigs performing in Leicester (1993).

Dulli formed the Afghan Whigs in late 1986 with bassist John Curley, who had also been a member of the Black Republicans, Rick McCollum, a guitarist who Dulli bonded with over their shared love of R&B, and later drummer Steve Earle. The band independently released their debut album Big Top Halloween in 1988, which had been recorded in Curley's home studio. The release caught the attention of Jonathan Poneman, the co-founder of Seattle-based indie label Sub Pop, who signed the band in 1989. The band released their first album with Sub Pop, Up in It, in 1990, and a follow-up in 1992, Congregation.

The band's success led to a contract with major label Elektra Records in 1992, where they released Gentlemen (1993) and Black Love (1996). In 1994, Dulli was featured in Backbeat, a film detailing the pre-fame years of the Beatles, where he portrayed John Lennon's singing voice. Dulli also appeared on Foo Fighters' debut album in 1995, as the only credited musician other than Dave Grohl. In 1997, Dulli moved to New Orleans, renting R.E.M. guitarist Peter Buck's house. Dulli also worked with directors Ted Demme and Joel Stillerman to produce a film script based on author Ann Imbrie's novel Spoken in Darkness (1993), which Elektra agreed to finance as a part of the band's 1992 contract, but the film was never made.

Disappointed with the management and lack of promotion through Elektra, the band signed with Columbia Records (who had to pay out Elektra for the contract), and in 1998 the group released 1965, which happened at the same time Dulli was receiving treatment for depression. While touring in support of 1965, Dulli was beaten by an employee of a Texas club until he had a fractured skull, sending him into a coma. However, he recovered and returned to touring in just two months.

The band did not perform together from September 1999 until announcing their split in February 2001, blaming the difficulties of working together with each member living in different US states. Dulli co-purchased Short Stop, a bar in Los Angeles, soon after the announcement.

=== 2000-2011: The Twilight Singers, The Gutter Twins ===
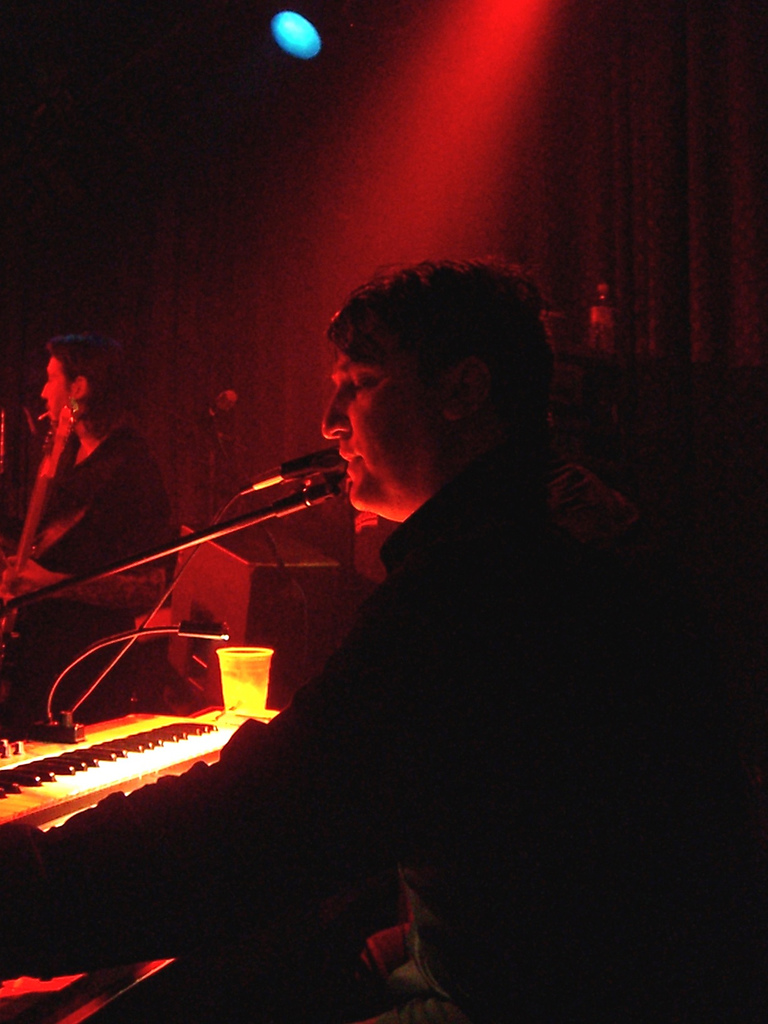
Greg Dulli (right) performing with The Twilight Singers in 2006.

Dulli's main musical project became the Twilight Singers. First formed in 1997 as a side project featuring New Orleans–based musicians, the group released their debut album Twilight as Played by The Twilight Singers in 2000. Dulli began working on a solo record, however due to the death of his close friend Ted Demme the sessions were shelved, and Dulli was inspired to write the band's second album Blackberry Belle (2003) instead. The solo material Dulli had written was eventually released as Amber Headlights in 2005. The Twilight Singers released the covers album She Loves You in 2004, followed by Powder Burns in 2006, and Dynamite Steps (2011).

Dulli and Mark Lanegan formed a group named the Gutter Twins, and signed to Sub Pop in 2008, releasing their debut album Saturnalia on the label, as well as an extended play Adorata in the same year. Dulli first met Lanegan in the early 1990s, and had been close friends and collaborators since the year 2000. Later that year, Dulli released a solo live album, featuring content he had recorded at The Triple Door in Seattle, for the A Drink for the Kids fundraising effort by The Vera Project. Dulli released a solo single in 2009, covering the Eddie Hinton tracks "Hard Luck Guy" and "Cover Me", as a part of Shake It Records' series vinyl single tributes to Hinton.

In October 2010, for the first time in his career Greg Dulli embarked on a solo tour, which saw him perform twenty-nine shows in five different countries.

=== 2011 onward: The Afghan Whigs revival, solo debut ===
In 2011 the Afghan Whigs announced that they were reuniting, the first time the band had been together since recording two songs in 2006 for the Afghan Whigs compilation album Unbreakable: A Retrospective 1990–2006. The band toured internationally for their 2012 reunion tour, reaching sixteen countries, and in the following year Dulli teamed up with Steve Kilbey of The Church for several live performances in Los Angeles.

In 2014, the band released their first album in 16 years, Do to the Beast, which debuted at number 32 on Billboard's Top 200 Albums and the #8 spot and #7 spot on the rock albums and alternative albums charts respectively. This was followed with a second revival album in 2017, titled In Spades.

After the release of In Spades and the death of Afghan Whigs' guitarist Dave Rosser, Dulli began to work on his first solo album. The album, Random Desire (2020), took influence from Prince and Todd Rundgren's methods of writing and performing almost every instrument on their records. Dulli's tour for the album was originally meant to be an international tour held from March to May, however this was postponed due to the effects of the COVID-19 pandemic.

== Personal life ==
Dulli co-owns several bars across the United States. Dulli co-owns three bars in Los Angeles: Short Stop on Sunset Boulevard (which he purchased in 2001), Club Tee Gee in Atwater Village and Footsies in Cypress Park. Additionally, Dulli co-owns three bars in his former residence New Orleans: the Royal Street Inn and R Bar in Faubourg Marigny, and Bud Rip's in Bywater.

== Discography ==
=== Studio albums ===
Title	Details
Random Desire	Released: February 21, 2020; Label: Royal Cream, BMG; Formats: CD, digital download, streaming, vinyl

=== Compilation albums ===
Title	Details
Amber Headlights	Released: September 6, 2005; Label: Infernal Recordings; Formats: CD, digital download

=== Live albums ===
Title	Details
Live at Triple Door	Released: October 28, 2008; Label: Infernal Recordings; Formats: CD, digital download
