= Spencer Gibb =

British musician

- Also known as: Jez Spencer
- Born: Spencer David Gibb; 21 September 1972 (age 54); London, England
- Genres: Alternative rock, power pop, contemporary R&B, soul
- Occupations: Musician, singer, songwriter
- Instruments: Vocals, guitar
- Years active: 1994–present
- Label: Rock Ridge

Spencer David Gibb (born 21 September 1972) is a British musician. He was a founding member of Austin, Texas-based band 54 Seconds. He is the first-born child of Robin Gibb of the Bee Gees and Molly Hullis.

== Early life ==
Spencer David Gibb was born on 21 September 1972 in London, the first child of Robin Gibb, a musician and member of the Bee Gees, and Molly Hullis, who worked as the personal assistant to the Beatles' manager Brian Epstein until his unexpected death in 1967. Gibb's godfather was Robert Stigwood, who managed the Bee Gees and Cream. On his father's side, he has English, Irish and Scottish descent. He was named Spencer by his father in honor of Robin's idol Winston Churchill, and his middle name David which was a tribute to his mother's late brother. At the time of his birth, the Bee Gees were recording Life in a Tin Can around September as his father had to leave the sessions on 21 September, and when his father returned to the sessions in a rented house in Los Angeles, Tom Kennedy recalls: "Robin was at home and when we came in, he was asleep on the floor. He'd been waiting up just to tell us about Spencer. He woke up and he was really excited". And when his father rushed into the family's home to meet Gibb he said, "Molly and I have been longing for a baby. I feel as though I'm living on cloud nine".

He started writing songs on piano and keyboards when he was about 11–12 as a day pupil at Scaitcliffe (now known as Bishopsgate) in Surrey. At 14, he left the prestigious St Paul's Public School in Barnes, London, to become a professional musician. He first started playing in bands in England and was working as a solo artist for a long time. Gibb moved to New York City where he dropped the keyboards in favour of the guitar. In the early 1990s, he moved to Florida and then moved to Austin, Texas. A dream urged him to move to Texas from Florida as he explained: "If there's anything I can say about living in Miami and doing drugs, it's that I learned to play guitar".

== Career ==
=== 1996–1997: Solo artist and 4-Track Mind ===
He recruited J.J. Johnson, Stewart Cochran, Johnny Goudie and Einar to play on his first album. Johnson suggested Cochran, who he had seen play with Abra Moore and David Garza. Gibb e-mailed Cochran, who at the time was touring Europe with Jimmy LaFave. When Cochran got back to Texas, he hooked up with Johnson and Gibb at the Austin Rehearsal Complex (ARC), and after hearing some demos, decided that he was in for the long haul. Around the same time, he released his debut album 4-Track Mind under the name 'Jez Spencer'. Later, Goudie left to form his band Goudie. After eight months, Einar also left as he also participated on the band Goudie. The remaining musicians played with a numerous of bassists including George Reiff. For the next few months, they played shows, until Reiff left. That is when they decided they wanted to really figure out their own unique sound and get serious and with that they found Glenn McGregor. It was their overseas manager at the time, Mark Chaplin, that suggested they pitch their music to his London partner John Wadlow. After sending Wadlow a few of their demos, Gibb phoned him. Wadlow and Gibb clashed from the word go. Wadlow was not impressed with the band being unnamed, and he only liked one of the songs, "In A Box," but he thought the chorus came in too late. Gibb's backing band consisted of J. J. Johnson, Johnny Goudie and Einar, but when Einar and Goudie left the band, the remaining members had performed with numerous bassists including George Reiff.

=== 1998–present: 54 Seconds ===
By 1998, the name was changed to 54 Seconds as they released numerous studio and live albums, they also released two singles. He also made his first film in 2005 on Hello God? as Pastor Jones, the film, along with Stewart Cochran (also a member of 54 Seconds). In 2007, 54 Seconds later covered "Run to Me" for Gibb's father and was included on A Song for My Father. Gibb also stars in Hostage (2008) as Charlie, McCartney's Genes (2008) as Zeke Scott. He also participated composing the soundtrack for Between Floors and also appearing on that film as a part of the crowd.

== Influences ==
Gibb stated that he was influenced by The Beatles, Led Zeppelin, Joni Mitchell, Stevie Wonder and Prince.

== Personal life ==
=== Dance floor encounters ===
After ferociously dancing in a Minneapolis club, Prince told Spencer he was a great dancer.

He unknowingly made out with Madonna on the dance floor of a New York City club.

=== Space exploration ===
Spencer's DNA has been launched into space.

== Discography ==
- 4-Track Mind (1997)
- Beautiful Mess (2010)
- Let's Start Over (2018)
- Beautiful Mess (EP) (2021)

     - with 54 Seconds

- Postcards from California (2007)

== Filmography ==
Gibb has acted in television and films. A sampling of his films and TV roles follows:

Year	Title	Role	Notes
2004	Hello God?	Pastor Jones	
2005	The King	Praise Band musician	
2008	Hostage	Charlie	Short film
2008	McCartney's Genes	Zeke Scott	
2009	Between Floors	audience member	
2010	The Notice	Margarete	Short film
2011	Proper Villains	The tailor	
2015	Anatomy of Evil	Willard	Movie
