= Scott Ford (musician) =

American musician

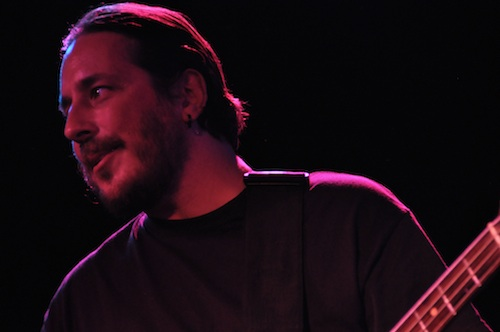
- Scott Ford - Live in Concert

Background information
- Origin: Southend-on-Sea / Los Angeles, California, United States
- Genres: Hard rock, rock
- Years active: 1979–present

Scott Ford is an American session bassist, vocalist, and arranger.

After extensive touring in Europe and America with his own bands Legal Tender, Fast Becoming Adam, and The Scott Ford Band, Scott moved to Los Angeles and began playing the studio and live circuit.

Scott is the founding bassist for Los Angeles-based cover band Camp Freddy and has played with The Twilight Singers since 2003, regularly contributing to the songwriting and arranging of the group's studio albums. Greg Dulli, The Twilight Singers founder and leader, credits Ford with "...helping turn his focus back to Twilight Singers. "There's probably not a bigger Twilight Singers fan in the whole world than Scott Ford," Dulli says. "I give Scott a lot of credit for me finishing 'Blackberry Belle,' 'Powder Burns' and the last three records I've done. Scott has been extremely valuable in the finishing of all those records. He's such a positive force for this band in particular, and Dave Rosser as well.

In 2009, it was announced that Ford had "an advanced bone loss medical condition resulting in severe blood infections". A benefit show was held on September 26 at The Roxy, with participation by Duff McKagan, Dave Navarro, Scott Shriner, Dave Kushner, Chris Chaney, Greg Dulli, Billy Morrison, Kenny Aronoff, Wayne Kramer, Donovan Leitch and Steve-O.
