= The Twilight Singers =

American indie rock band

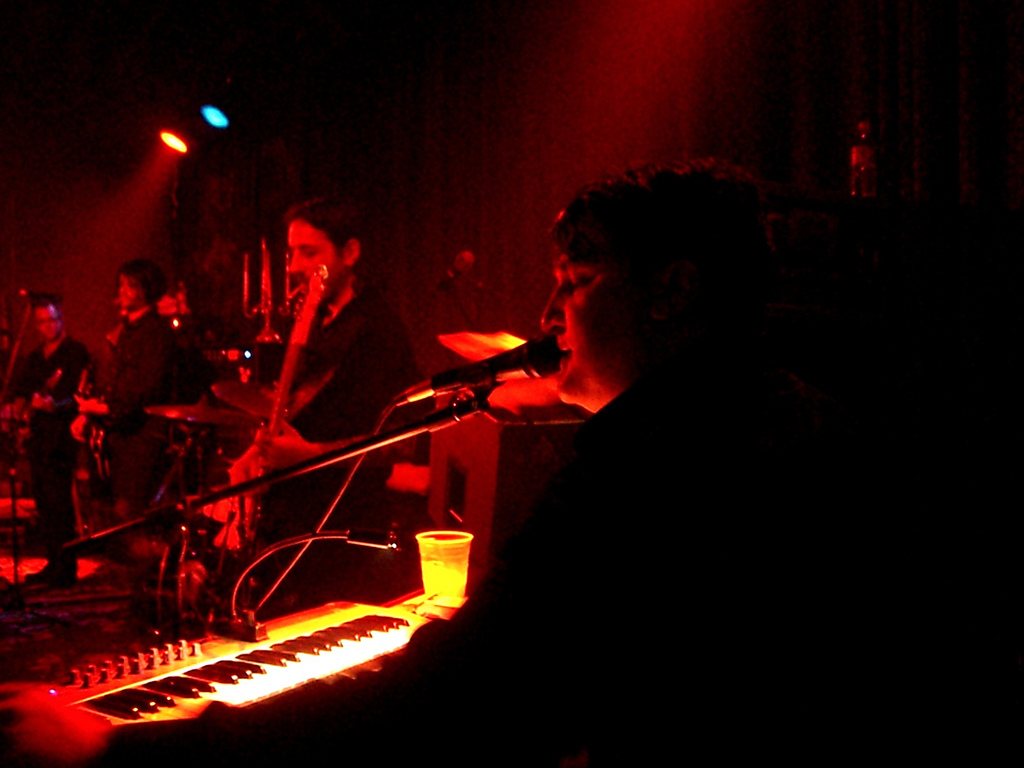
- The Twilight Singers performing in 2006

Background information
- Origin: New Orleans, Louisiana, U.S.
- Genres: Indie rock, alternative rock
- Years active: 1997–present
- Labels: Columbia, One Little Indian, Sub Pop
- Members: Greg Dulli; Scott Ford; Greg Wieczorek; Rick G. Nelson
- Past members: Dave Rosser; Cully Symington; Jon Skibic; Michael Sullivan; John Nooney; Mathias Schneeberger; Peter Adams; Manuel Agnelli; Shawn Smith; Harold "Happy" Chichester; Bobby MacIntyre; Brian Young; Jeff Klein; Michael Horrigan
- Website: thetwilightsingers.com

The Twilight Singers are an American indie rock band. It was formed in 1997 by Greg Dulli as a side project during a hiatus from his group The Afghan Whigs. After the Afghan Whigs disbanded, Dulli used The Twilight Singers as his own artistic vehicle and has now released five studio albums backed by worldwide tours.

== History ==
=== Demos era ===
While in-between Afghan Whigs albums and amidst a dispute with their record label, Elektra Records, Dulli recorded demos for the act with friends and collaborators Shawn Smith (Brad, Satchel, Pigeonhed) and Harold "Happy" Chichester (Royal Crescent Mob, Howlin' Maggie) at Kingsway Studio with producer engineer Ryan Hadlock in New Orleans. These demos set an exceptionally dark, tense mood, even for Greg Dulli. As a result of The Afghan Whigs' label troubles, it is debated whether or not Elektra may have leaked the demo tapes unto the internet, as they were widely circulated in the trader circuit.

The Afghan Whigs settled their dispute with Elektra and signed with Sony/Columbia in April 1998. Columbia optioned The Twilight Singers recordings, but preferred to release a new Afghan Whigs album instead. The Afghan Whigs' swan song 1965 was released in October 1998 to wide critical acclaim. The band toured for one year in support of the album but decided to disband in February 2001.

=== Twilight and Blackberry Belle ===
In 2000, Greg Dulli revived The Twilight Singers, reworking the original leaked demos with dance producers and remix auteurs Fila Brazillia. Columbia released the album as Twilight as Played by The Twilight Singers in September 2000. The band toured with members of Howlin' Maggie and former Afghan Whigs' drummer, Michael Horrigan, on bass.

Dulli took time off following the short tour for Twilight, investing in a bar in Los Angeles. In 2001, he began working on the follow-up for Twilight tentatively titled Amber Headlights. The death of Dulli's friend, director Ted Demme in January 2002, forced him to shelve the project, and he took a second leave from writing and recording. After reading the Jack London book Martin Eden, and experiencing an earthquake, Dulli set about writing the concept album that became Blackberry Belle.

With a large cast of performers, including former Prince protégé Apollonia and former Screaming Trees singer Mark Lanegan, Blackberry Belle became an examination of the dark side of love and loss, a familiar topic revisited from former Afghan Whigs albums like Black Love. Critics welcomed Dulli's return and were eager to give his second album, independently financed and released through One Little Indian Records in October 2003, high marks.

=== She Loves You and Powder Burns ===
A second touring version of The Twilight Singers including Jon Skibic (guitars), Scott Ford (bass), John Nooney (keys) and Bobby Macintyre (drums), made two legs through the United States and Europe in 2003 and 2004.

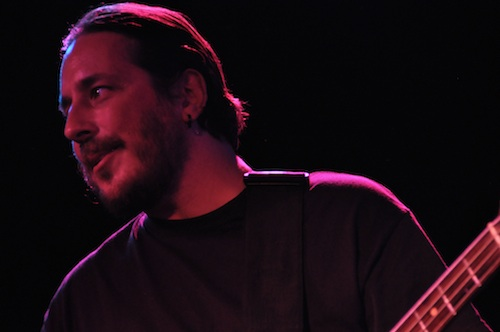
Scott Ford of Twilight Singers

In August 2004, the band released their third album, She Loves You, a collection of cover songs from artists as varied as Fleetwood Mac, Mary J. Blige, Björk, and George Gershwin.

In September 2005, Dulli finally released his formerly shelved Amber Headlights album as his first solo album. He continued working on his fourth Twilight Singers album which was partly recorded by generator power in New Orleans in the aftermath of Hurricane Katrina.

By 2005, The Twilight Singers' three albums had sold a combined total of 58,000 copies, according to Nielsen SoundScan.

The Twilight Singers released Powder Burns on May 16, 2006, supported by tours in the United States, Europe, Israel, Australia, and New Zealand. The third touring version of The Twilight Singers included Dave Rosser, (guitars), Scott Ford (bass), singer/songwriter Jeff Klein (keys) and Bobby Macintyre (drums). Mark Lanegan also toured with the group. On January 3, 2007, The Twilight Singers made their television debut on Jimmy Kimmel Live!, performing their songs "Forty Dollars" from Powder Burns and "Sublime" from A Stitch in Time. The band was joined by friend and musician Joseph Arthur on guitar and vocals.

In mid-2009, The Twilight Singers' cover of "When Doves Cry" was issued on Spin magazine's download album Purplish Rain.

=== Dynamite Steps ===
Greg Dulli completed work on the fifth Twilight Singers album, entitled Dynamite Steps, in late 2010. The album was released to warm critical acclaim on February 15, 2011, via Sub Pop Records. Prior to the new album's release in September 2010, the band issued the album track "Blackbird and the Fox", featuring guest vocals from Ani DiFranco, as a free download on their website. The band supported the album's release with live in-store performances at Amoeba Music in Los Angeles and San Francisco, then appeared again on Jimmy Kimmel Live! on February 23, 2011, performing the songs "On the Corner" and "Gunshots", both featuring guest guitarist and vocalist Joseph Arthur.

The Twilight Singers performed "On The Corner" on the Late Show with David Letterman on April 26, 2011.

=== Live In New York ===
The Twilight Singers released their first live album on November 15, 2011.

== Discography ==
=== Albums ===
| Date | Title | Label |
|---|---|---|
| September 12, 2000 | Twilight as Played by The Twilight Singers | Columbia |
| October 14, 2003 | Blackberry Belle | One Little Indian |
| August 24, 2004 | She Loves You | One Little Indian |
| May 16, 2006 | Powder Burns | One Little Indian |
| February 15, 2011 | Dynamite Steps | Sub Pop Records |
| November 15, 2011 | Live In New York | Infernal Recordings |
| October 10, 2023 | Black Out The Windows/Ladies and Gentlemen, The Twilight Singers | One Little Independent Records |

=== Singles and EPs ===
- Black Is the Color of My True Love's Hair (EP) (October 7, 2003; Birdman Recordings)
- "Teenage Wristband" single (November 10, 2003; One Little Indian)
- "Feathers"/"Number Nine" single (January 26, 2004; One Little Indian)
- "Too Tough to Die"/"Hard Time Killing Floor" single (November 15, 2004; One Little Indian)
- "There's Been an Accident" digital single (May 15, 2006; One Little Indian)
- "I'm Ready" single (July 10, 2006; One Little Indian)
- A Stitch in Time (EP) (December 4, 2006; One Little Indian)
- "On the Corner" (2011)

Music Videos

"On the Corner" (2011)

"Number Nine" (2023)
