= Music of Ohio =

== Notable institutions ==
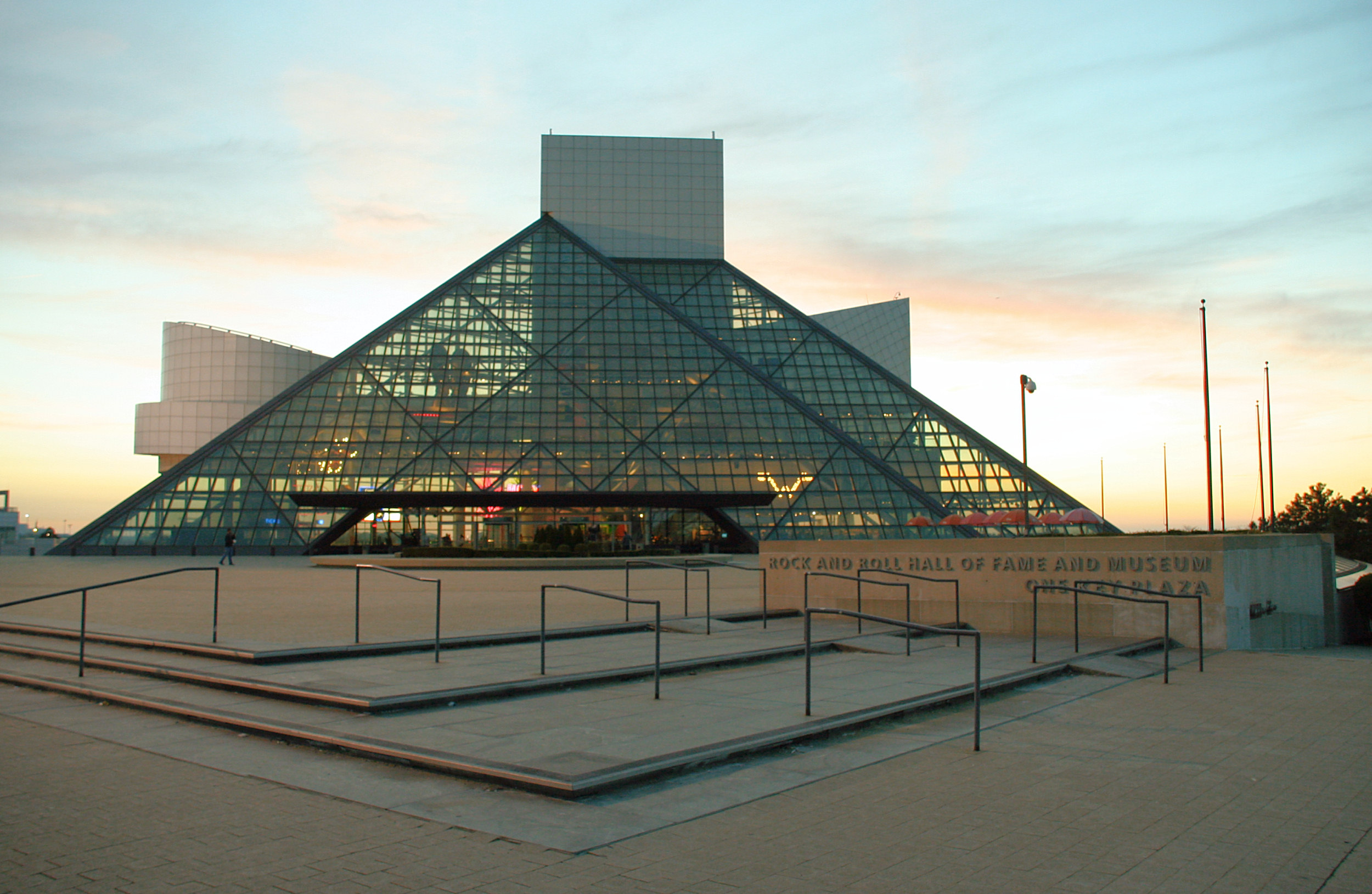
Rock and Roll Hall of Fame and Museum in Cleveland, Ohio

The Rock and Roll Hall of Fame is located in Cleveland, Ohio. Ohio musicians inducted into the Rock and Roll Hall of Fame include The Isley Brothers (from Cincinnati) in 1992, Bootsy Collins (from Cincinnati) in 1997, The Moonglows (from Cleveland) in 2000, The O'Jays (from Canton) in 2005, Chrissie Hynde (from Akron) of The Pretenders in 2005, and Bobby Womack (from Cleveland) in 2009. This state is also the home of four major symphony orchestras which are located in Cleveland, Akron, Cincinnati, and Dayton as well as a "pops" orchestra, the Cincinnati Pops. Columbus has hosted the annual three-day hard rock Rock on the Range festival each May since 2007 until 2018, and has hosted the Sonic Temple Music Festival from 2019 to the present.

== Notable musicians ==
Popular musicians from Ohio include Neil Giraldo, Trippie Redd, Mamie Smith, Dean Martin, Dave Grohl, Tyler Joseph and Josh Dun of Twenty One Pilots, Frankie Yankovic, Doris Day, The McGuire Sisters, The Isley Brothers, Bobby Womack, Howard Hewett, Shirley Murdock, Boz Scaggs, John Legend, Marilyn Manson, Dan Auerbach and Patrick Carney of The Black Keys, Griffin Layne, Joe Dolce, Benjamin Orr of The Cars, Chrissie Hynde of The Pretenders, William "Bootsy" Collins, Stefanie Eulinberg of Kid Rock's Twisted Brown Trucker Band and Devo.

Doris Day (from Cincinnati; d.2019) had a number one Billboard Hot 100 hit in 1945 with "Sentimental Journey". Dean Martin had a number one Billboard Hot 100 hit with "Everybody Loves Somebody" in 1964. The O'Jays had a number one Hot 100 hit with "Love Train" in 1972. The Ohio Players had two number one Hot 100 hits, including the funk song "Love Rollercoaster" in 1976. Wild Cherry had a number one Hot 100 hit with "Play That Funky Music" also in 1976. Bone Thugs-n-Harmony had a number one Hot 100 hit with "Tha Crossroads" in 1996. John Legend had a number one Hot 100 hit with "All of Me" in 2014. Bo Donaldson and The Heywoods had a number one Hot 100 hit with "Billy Don't Be A Hero" in 1974. In addition, Ohio musicians with a number one album on the Billboard 200 include the R&B group The Isley Brothers (from Cincinnati) with two number one albums, including The Heat is On in 1975, folk singer Tracy Chapman with her Tracy Chapman album in 1988, Nine Inch Nails with two number one albums including With Teeth in 2005, Marilyn Manson with two including Mechanical Animals in 1998, The Black Keys with Turn Blue in 2014, and Twenty One Pilots (from Columbus) with Blurryface in 2015 and Breach in 2025. Country group Rascal Flatts (from Columbus) has had four number one albums including Me and My Gang in 2006. 98 Degrees (from Cincinnati) had a number two album on the Billboard 200 with Revelation in 2000.

== Blues ==
Blues singer Mamie Smith is thought to have been born in Cincinnati. Singer and saxophonist Bull Moose Jackson was born in Cleveland. Robert Lockwood Jr., born in Arkansas, moved to Cleveland in 1960, where he lived the later half of his life. Pianist Barrelhouse Chuck was born in Columbus. Organist Mike Finnigan was born in Troy. Singer-songwriter and pianist Tommy Tucker was born in Springfield. Jump blues singer H-Bomb Ferguson was from Cincinnati. Guitarist Sonny Moorman was born in Cincinnati. Singer Bessie Brown was born in Marysville.

== Jazz ==
Art Tatum, widely acknowledged as one of the greatest and most influential jazz pianists of all time, was born in Toledo. Double bassist Gene Taylor, singer Teresa Brewer, and pianists Stanley Cowell and Larry Fuller were also born in "The Glass City".

Cleveland has an important place in jazz as a stop on the club circuit. Artists from Cleveland include Freddie Webster, a trumpeter cited by Miles Davis as an early influence, and Tadd Dameron, a prominent pianist, composer, and arranger of the bop era. Benny Bailey was a trumpeter who followed Dameron and in turn influenced Cleveland jazz musicians in his wake, including Albert Ayler, avant-garde jazz saxophonist, who was born in Cleveland Heights. Also from Cleveland are vocalist Jimmy Scott, pianist Bobby Few, saxophonist Ernie Krivda, saxophonist Joe Lovano, guitarist Bill DeArango, pianist Shelly Berg, bassists Ike Isaacs and Albert Stinson, pianist and composer Hale Smith, cellist Abdul Wadud, trombonist and bandleader John Fedchock, saxophonist Rich Perry, trumpeter Frances Klein, and trumpeter and flugelhornist Bill Hardman. The Jazz Temple was an important jazz venue in Cleveland from 1962-63.

Columbus-born jazz musicians include multi-instrumentalist Rahsaan Roland Kirk, bandleader and trombonist Bobby Byrne, trumpeter Harry Edison, organist and pianist Hank Marr, organist Don Patterson, pianist John Sheridan, saxophonist Steve Potts, and bassist and composer Foley.

Zanesville jazz artists include singer and pianist Una Mae Carlisle, ragtime composer Harry P. Guy, and trumpeter Andy Gibson.

Springfield has produced pianist, organist, and arranger Charles Thompson, drummer Johnny Lytle, clarinetist Cecil Scott, pianist Call Cobbs, Jr., trombonist Quentin Jackson, multi-instrumentalist Garvin Bushell, saxophonist Earle Warren, and singer Ada Lee.

Dayton was the birthplace of trombonist Booty Wood, guitarist John Scofield, trumpeter Snooky Young, drummer J.C. Heard, alto saxophonist and flautist Bud Shank, and Billy Strayhorn, a close collaborator of Duke Ellington.

Cincinnati-born jazz musicians include pianist, composer, arranger, and theorist George Russell, saxophonist and bandleader Frank Foster, pianist and composer Mike Longo, guitarist Kenny Poole, tenor saxophonist Don Braden, singer Amy London, alto saxophonist Sonny Cox, pianist and composer Fred Hersch, and saxophonist and arranger Jimmy Mundy.

Youngstown has produced guitarist James Emery, singer, dancer, and drummer Sonny Parker, and avant-garde singer Jay Clayton.

Pianist Dave Burrell and singer/bassist Virtue Hampton Whitted were born in Middletown. Trumpeters, and brothers, Russell Smith and Joe Smith were born in Ripley. Pianist Dorothy Sloop was born in Steubenville. Bandleader Ted Lewis was born in Circleville. Singer Jon Hendricks was born in Newark. Trombonist Vic Dickenson was born in Xenia. Cornet player Bill Davison was born in Defiance. Tenor saxophonist Joe Henderson was born in Lima. Trombonist, vocalist, and bandleader Pee Wee Hunt was born in Mount Healthy. Bandleader Sammy Kaye was born in Lakewood. Violinist Stuff Smith was born in Portsmouth. Bassist Michael Moore was born in Glen Este. Drummer Nick Ceroli was born in Niles. Flautist and saxophonist Norris Turney was born in Wilmington. The Mills Brothers vocal group were from Piqua. Pianist Terry Waldo was born in Ironton. Singer Nancy Wilson was born in Chillicothe. Saxophonist Mark Turner was born in Fairborn.

== Classical ==
Composers Hale Smith and H. Leslie Adams were born in Cleveland. Operatic soprano Kathleen Battle was born in Portsmouth. Cincinnati is home to the American Classical Music Hall of Fame and Museum.

== Modernism ==
Ruth Crawford Seeger, influential modernist composer, was born in East Liverpool, Ohio. As a composer, Seeger was active primarily during the 1920s and 1930s, then became an American folk music specialist from the late 1930s until her death in 1953.

== Folk ==
In 1937-38, John, Alan, and Elizabeth Lomax made field recordings in Ohio for the Archive of American Folk Song, Library of Congress, including songs of Captain Pearl R. Nye about life on the Ohio and Erie Canal and recordings at the Ohio Valley Folk Festival at Cincinnati Music Hall.

Ohio folksinger and scholar Anne Grimes recorded Ohio State Ballads for Folkways Records, released in 1957.

Jim Glover of Jim and Jean is from Cleveland. Glover attended Ohio State University, where in 1959 he met and mentored Phil Ochs, who grew up in Columbus.

Singer-songwriter Fred Neil was born in Cleveland.

== Bluegrass ==
Bluegrass singer and guitarist Larry Sparks was born and raised in Lebanon. Jerry Douglas, lap steel and resonator guitar player, was born in Warren. Singer and guitarist Harley Allen was born in Dayton. Banjo player John Hickman was born in Hilliard and grew up in Columbus. Banjo player Tom Hanway was born in Cleveland. Hotmud Family were from Dayton. The Rarely Herd are from Athens County.

== Country ==
- Bobby Bare is from Ironton.
- Lionel Cartwright is from Gallipolis.
- David Allan Coe is from Akron.
- Earl Thomas Conley is from West Portsmouth.
- Cowboy Copas is from Blue Creek.
- Griffin Layne was born in Kettering.
- Buddy Miller is from Fairborn.
- Mark Miller, the lead singer of Sawyer Brown, is from Dayton.
- Johnny Paycheck is from Greefield.
- Pure Prairie League from Waverly. ("Amie" 1975)
- Rascal Flatts was formed in Columbus. Lead singer Gary LeVox is an alumnus of Ohio State University.
- Marty Roe, the lead singer of Diamond Rio, is from Lebanon.
- Roy Rogers is from Portsmouth.
- Kim Taylor is from Cincinnati.
- Dwight Yoakam was raised in Columbus.

== Polka ==
Cleveland is home to the Polka Hall of Fame in Euclid.

Accordion player and polka musician Frankie Yankovic grew-up in Cleveland's Collinwood neighborhood, known for its large Slovenian population. Yankovic popularized Slovenian style polka in the United States, with many hit songs including his recordings of "In Heaven There is No Beer" and "Who Stole the Kishka."

== R&B, soul, and funk ==
Tiny Bradshaw, rhythm and blues bandleader, singer, composer, pianist and drummer, was born in Youngstown.

Blues, R&B singer Screamin' Jay Hawkins gained R&B hit "I Put a Spell On You" in 1956. Hawkins is from Cleveland, Ohio. R&B singer Lula Reed was born in Port Clinton. She recorded for Cincinnati label King Records and its subsidiary Federal Records, among others, in the 1950s–60s.

Doo-wop, an influential vocal harmony-based R&B form popular in the 1950s and early 1960s, was well-represented in Ohio. Groups from the state include The Students, The Valentinos, The Casinos, The Moonglows (from Cleveland), The Stereos, The Edsels, Mills Brothers, and The Constellations.

Ruby & the Romantics were an Akron-based R&B group in the 1960s. The Hesitations were an R&B group from Cleveland formed in 1965. Motown artist Sandra Tilley was born in Cleveland. Soul singer Ruby Winters was raised in Cincinnati.

During the 1970s, southwest Ohio, and Dayton in particular, was known for its stable of funk bands, including Bootsy's Rubber Band, The Ohio Players, Lakeside, Slave, Aurra, Sun, Dayton, Faze O, and Zapp featuring Roger Troutman.

Walter "Junie" Morrison, is a musician and producer born in Dayton. Morrison was a producer, writer, keyboardist and vocalist for the funk band the Ohio Players in the early 1970s, where he wrote and produced their first major hits, "Pain", "Pleasure", "Ecstasy" and "Funky Worm" (1971–1972). He left the band in 1974 to release three solo albums on Westbound Records (When We Do, Freeze, and Suzie Supergroupie). In 1977 Morrison joined George Clinton's P-Funk (Parliament-Funkadelic) where he became musical director. He brought a unique sound to P-Funk and played a key role during the time of their greatest popularity from 1978 through 1980. In particular, he made prominent contributions to the platinum-selling Funkadelic album One Nation Under a Groove, the single "(Not Just) Knee Deep" (a number one hit on the U.S. R&B charts in 1979) and the gold-selling Parliament albums Motor Booty Affair, and Gloryhallastoopid. Morrison also played on and produced some P-Funk material under the pseudonym J.S. Theracon, apparently to avoid contractual difficulties. Morrison is a member of the Rock and Roll Hall of Fame, inducted in 1997 with fifteen other members of Parliament-Funkadelic, including lead guitarist Michael "Kid Funkadelic" Hampton, from Cleveland, and Bootsy Collins, from Cincinnati.

Originally raised in Lincoln Heights, near Cincinnati, The Isley Brothers are an R&B, soul music and funk group. They have had a notably long-running success on the Billboard charts and are the only act to chart in the Top 40 in six separate decades. In 2006, their most recent release became their ninth album to reach the Top Ten of the Billboard 200. Over the years, the act has performed in a variety of genres, including doo-wop, R&B, rock 'n' roll, soul, funk, disco, urban adult contemporary and hip-hop soul. The group has gone through several lineups, ranging from a quartet to a trio to a sextet; they are currently a duo. The original group consisted of the three elder sons of O'Kelly Isley, Sr. and Sally Bell Isley: O'Kelly Jr., Rudolph and Ronald, who formed in 1954 and recorded with small labels singing doo-wop and rock and roll. After modest success with singles such as "Shout", "Twist and Shout" and the Motown single "This Old Heart of Mine (Is Weak for You)", and a brief tenure with Jimi Hendrix as a background guitar player, the group settled on a brand of gritty soul and funk defined by the Grammy-winning smash "It's Your Thing" in 1969.

The O'Jays are a Canton-based soul and R&B group, originally consisting of Walter Williams (born August 25, 1942), Bill Isles, Bobby Massey, William Powell (January 20, 1942 – May 26, 1977) and Eddie Levert (b. June 16, 1942). The O'Jays were inducted into the Vocal Group Hall of Fame in 2004, and the Rock and Roll Hall of Fame in 2005. The O'Jays (now a trio after the departure of Isles and Massey) had their first hit with "Lonely Drifter", in 1963. In spite of the record's success, the group was considering quitting the music business until Gamble & Huff, a team of producers and songwriters, took an interest in the group. With Gamble & Huff, the O'Jays emerged at the forefront of Philadelphia soul with "Back Stabbers" (1972), a pop hit, and topped the U.S. Hot 100 singles charts the following year with "Love Train".

Sly, Slick and Wicked is a R&B singing group from Cleveland, active since 1970. The trio has recorded for Paramount, People Records, Polydor, Shaker, Jupar, Motown, Sweet City, and Epic. They were inducted into The R&B Music Hall of Fame in 2013. Justin Timberlake sampled their hit song "Sho Nuff" in the multi-platinum song "Suit & Tie".

24-Carat Black were a soul, R&B, and funk band from Cincinnati in the early 1970s who recorded for Stax Records.

In 2004, The Numero Group released the compilation Eccentric Soul: The Capsoul Label, Numero's first release; followed in 2014 by Eccentric Soul: Capitol City Soul. Prix was another small Columbus soul label which also released Marion Black. Numero released a collection of found unreleased songs and demo recordings from the label Eccentric Soul: The Prix Label in 2007. An unreleased song by local group Penny and the Quarters, "You and Me", was featured prominently in the 2010 film Blue Valentine. Cleveland's Boddie Recording Company was remembered in a 2011 collection by Numero. The Way Out Label of Cleveland was collected by Numero on Eccentric Soul: The Way Out Label in 2014.

Aurra was a 1980s soul group from Dayton, which, at the time of its biggest success, was composed of Curt Jones and Starleana Young. Aurra started off in 1979 as an offshoot of the funk band Slave. Aurra was created by Steve "The Fearless Leader" Washington which featured Curt Jones, Starleana Young, Charles Carter, and Buddy Hankerson on the first LP.

The Dazz Band is a funk band that was most popular in the early 1980s. Emerging from Cleveland, the group's biggest hit songs include the Grammy Award-winning "Let It Whip" (1982), "Joystick" (1983), and "Let It All Blow" (1984). The name of the band is a portmanteau of the description "danceable jazz".

LeVert is a soul, funk, go-go group, formed in Cleveland in 1984, comprising Sean and Gerald Levert, the sons of O'Jays founder Eddie Levert, with Marc Gordon. LeVert gained R&B hit "(Pop pop pop) Goes My Mind" in 1986.

The Deele (pronounced The Deal) was a 1980s R&B band from Cincinnati, originally consisting of Indianapolis native Kenny "Babyface" Edmonds along with Antonio "L.A." Reid, Carlos "Satin" Greene, Darnell "Dee" Bristol, Stanley Burke, and Kevin "Kayo" Roberson. They have reunited in an incarnation featuring Bristol, Greene, Roberson, and Burke.

Singer Anita Baker was born in Toledo. She garnered attention for the jazz-soul hit "Sweet Love".

Men at Large from Cleveland formed in 1992.

== Rock and heavy metal ==
=== Rock/pop ===
- Rick Derringer from Fort Recovery - when he was seventeen years old, his band The McCoys recorded "Hang on Sloopy" in the summer of 1965, which became the number one song in America.
- Boz Scaggs from Canton
- James Gang from Cleveland
- Joe Walsh from Columbus
- Marc Cohn is from a Cleveland suburb and attended Oberlin College
- Rock and Roll Hall of Fame member Richie Furay is from Yellow Springs
- Michael Stanley, Cleveland
- Tom Scholz of the band Boston, was born in Toledo and raised in the suburb of Ottawa Hills.
- The Teardrops, girl group from Cincinnati
- Al Jardine of The Beach Boys, born in Lima
- Tommy James of The Shondells, born in Dayton
- Scott Walker of The Walker Brothers is from Hamilton
- Kim Deal of Pixies and The Breeders, from Dayton
- Joe Dolce, had a UK Number 1 hit with "Shaddap You Face" and is from Painesville
- Glass Harp are from Youngstown
- Tim "Ripper" Owens of Judas Priest from Akron
- Members of Warrant, Jani Lane (d.2011) (Kent/Brimfield) and Steven Sweet (Wadsworth) are from the Akron area.
- Dave Grohl of Nirvana, Foo Fighters, and Them Crooked Vultures is from Warren
- Scott Weiland (d. 2015) lead singer of Stone Temple Pilots and Velvet Revolver lived in a Cleveland suburb during his youth
- Haymarket Riot (band) is from Cincinnati
- Glen Buxton the guitarist for the original Alice Cooper Band was born in Akron
- Gilby Clarke and Steven Adler of Guns N' Roses were born in Cleveland
- Scott Shriner, the bassist of Weezer is from Toledo
- Red Wanting Blue from Columbus
- Granicus, Cleveland
- Patrick Sweany is from Massillon
- Foxy Shazam, "I Like It" 2012 from Cincinnati
- Josh Krajcik, runner-up on The X Factor in 2011, was born in Wooster
- Black Veil Brides, highest charting album was Wretched and Divine: The Story of the Wild Ones in 2013, from Cincinnati
- The Toll, from Columbus
- Mushroomhead is from Cleveland
- Pat McLoughlin of The Cyrkle, born in Columbus

=== Garage rock ===
Ohio was home to a wide variety of garage bands from the 1960s, including The Bare Facts, The Baskerville Hounds, The Choir, The Human Beinz, The Music Explosion, The Outsiders, and the Velvet Crest. The Choir later added singer Eric Carmen and became Raspberries, pioneers of power pop in the early 1970s.

More recently, the Greater Cincinnati area has produced The Greenhornes. Akron has produced The Black Keys. Columbus has produced New Bomb Turks, Gaunt, Thomas Jefferson Slave Apartments, and Scrawl. Maumee produced Soledad Brothers. Cincinnati produced Heartless Bastards.

=== Power pop ===
Ohio has produced a number of famous power pop bands. Raspberries ("Go All the Way") from Cleveland and Youngstown's Blue Ash ("Abracadabra Have You Seen Her?") are considered seminal artists in this genre. Circus from Cleveland was also a major exporter of the classic Ohio power pop sound. The Bears (aka Psychodots and The Raisins) are also considered a successful Cincinnati band. The Girls! are a power pop band from Columbus. Ohio Express did the bubblegum pop song "Yummy Yummy Yummy" in 1968. The Action, from Stow, Ohio, was active in the late 1970s and early 1980s.

=== Punk rock ===
A wide variety of punk rockers hail from Akron, Cleveland, and Cincinnati, primarily; these include electric eels, The Dead Boys, Rocket From The Tombs, Pere Ubu, Devo "Whip It" (from Akron; Mark Mothersbaugh went to Kent State), Mirrors, The Styrenes, The Waitresses "I Know What Boys Like" (from Akron), Lucky Pierre, Chi-Pig, Shaun Dente of Twenty-Nineteen, Chrissie Hynde (from Akron; she attended Kent State) of The Pretenders "I'll Stand By You", The Cramps, Robert Quine, Tin Huey, Rachel Sweet, Pagans, Zero Defex, Hammer Damage, The Bizarros, and Rubber City Rebels. Columbus has produced Screaming Urge, Scrawl, New Bomb Turks, and Gaunt. The Gits formed in Yellow Springs in 1986 before relocating to Seattle. The GC5 emerged from Mansfield in the mid 1990s.

Hardcore punk had considerable beginnings in Ohio, most notably with Maumee's Necros, Akron's 0DFx, and Dayton's Toxic Reasons.

=== Indie rock ===
The Black Keys formed in Akron. The Black Keys had four number one songs on the Alternative Songs chart in the early 2010s. Karen O and Brian Chase of Yeah Yeah Yeahs met at Oberlin College, as did the band Bitch Magnet. Cloud Nothings and My Dad Is Dead were formed in Cleveland. Indie folk rock singer Kramies is from Cleveland. Mark Kozelek, leader of Sun Kil Moon and Red House Painters, is from Massillon. Jason Molina of Songs: Ohia / Magnolia Electric Co. is from Lorain. Jessica Bailiff is from Toledo. Jessica Lea Mayfield is from Kent. Mark Eitzel of American Music Club founded his first bands, most prominently The Naked Skinnies, while living in Columbus. Columbus has also produced Times New Viking, Saintseneca, The Lost Revival and The Black Swans. Dayton in the early 1990s produced some notable indie bands including Guided by Voices, The Breeders ("Cannonball"), and Braniac. Cincinnati's indie rock scene produced Ass Ponys, Afghan Whigs, and Over the Rhine, all active in the 1980s/1990s as well as current indie rock bands Walk the Moon ("Shut Up and Dance" in 2015. Nicholas Petricca attended Kenyon College), Wussy, Pomegranates, Bad Veins, Heartless Bastards, and The National from Cincinnati (had a number three album on Billboard 200 in 2010. Matt Berninger attended the University of Cincinnati). Why? was formed in Cincinnati by the Wolf brothers, Jonathan 'Yoni' and Josiah Wolf, along with Doug McDiarmid.

=== Indie pop and pop punk ===
Hawthorne Heights is from Dayton, Hit The Lights is from Lima, Dead Poetic is from New Lebanon, Bad Veins is from Cincinnati, City Lights are from Columbus, and Citizen has its origins in Toledo.

=== Alternative rock ===
Blessid Union of Souls from Morrow charted with "Hey Leonardo (She Likes Me for Me)" in 1999. Mark Foster of Foster the People is from Nordonia, about 30 minutes outside of Cleveland. Filter is also based out of Cleveland. Hawthorne Heights from Dayton had a number three album on the Billboard 200 with If Only You Were Lonely in 2006. Save The Lost Boys are also from Dayton. Twenty One Pilots is from Columbus, and the band has had 12 number one songs on the Alternative Songs chart. Singer and musician Tyler Joseph also attended the Ohio State University and was a solo artist for some time. The band Starset is from Columbus, Ohio.

=== Christian rock ===
Relient K ("Be My Escape") is from Canton, Wolves at the Gate is from Cedarville, Sanctus Real formed in Toledo, Phil Keaggy is from Youngstown, and Hollyn is from Waverly.

=== Alternative metal ===
Nine Inch Nails (had four number one songs on the Alternative Songs chart in the mid 00s) and Filter ("Take a Picture") are from Cleveland, Maynard James Keenan (musician and lead singer for Tool and A Perfect Circle) is from Ravenna, and Marilyn Manson is from Canton.

=== Death metal ===
Necrophagia is from Wellsville, Skeletonwitch is from Athens, and Woe of Tyrants is from Chillicothe.

=== Metalcore ===
The Devil Wears Prada formed in Dayton. Wolves At The Gate is from Cedarville. Beartooth, My Ticket Home, and Like Moths to Flames are from Columbus. Inhale Exhale, Integrity, Chimaira, and Salt the Wound are from Cleveland. The Plot In You are from Hancock County. Black Veil Brides, Corpus Christi, Beneath the Sky, Come the Dawn, and Close To Home are from Cincinnati. Miss May I are from Troy. The Crimson Armada and Attack Attack! are from Westerville. From a Second Story Window are from Ohio/Pennsylvania. Rose Funeral and Brojob are from Cincinnati.

== Hip hop ==
Bow Wow (had two number three Billboard 200 albums like Wanted in 2005). and Fatty Koo are both from the Columbus area. Tash of the Tha Alkaholiks was raised in Columbus before moving to the west coast.

Youngstown is also a prime location for underground hip hop artists, such as rappers Copywrite, Illogic, Blueprint, Pryslezz (Alexander August), Streetz Ishu (RIP), The Audiologists (Da Bopman & Zitro), KeilYn, and producer RJD2. Blueprint and RJD2 formed the alternative hip hop group Soul Position under Rhymesayers Entertainment.

Bone Thugs n Harmony, a popular midwest hip hop act, hails from Cleveland. Also from Cleveland are Kid Cudi (had a number two album on Billboard 200 in 2013), Ray Cash, Machine Gun Kelly (MGK) (has had two number one albums), known for the song "Bad Things" with Camila Cabello), and King Chip (formerly "Chip The Ripper").

Additionally, Stalley is from Massillon, John Legend is from Springfield, and Hi-Tek and Clouddead are from Cincinnati.

== Electronic ==
Elisha Gray, born in Barnesville, invented one of the first electronic musical instruments, the musical telegraph, in 1876, a forerunner of the modern synthesizer. Electronic music pioneer Donald Erb was born in Youngstown. The ambient/drone trio Emeralds was formed in Cleveland. Electro artist Sudan Archives was born in Cincinnati.

== Experimental ==
- Scott Walker, Hamilton
- Elliott Sharp, born in Cleveland.
- The Golden Palominos, Cleveland
- The Numbers Band, Kent
- Mike Hovancsek, Kent

== Record labels and management companies ==
There have been a number of record labels based in Ohio. Most prominent was King Records, a label based out of Cincinnati that specialized in "Hillbilly Records" and "Race Records". Also prominent from Cincinnati were Jewel Records, Fraternity Records, and Blue Jordan Records. Classical music is served by Telarc Records of Cleveland. StandBy Records operates out of Cleveland. The independent label Off-Guard Records is based in Columbus. Rockathon Records is owned by Dayton local Robert Pollard. Currently, Old Flame Records operates out of Cincinnati.

== See also ==
- List of songs about Ohio

== Bibliography ==
- Blush, Steven (2001). American Hardcore: A Tribal History. Los Angeles, CA: Feral House. ISBN 0-922915-71-7.
