= Blue Meanies (Illinois band) =

American ska band (1989–2001, 2014)

The Blue Meanies
- Origin: Carbondale, Illinois, United States
- Genres: Ska-punk, hardcore punk, experimental rock
- Years active: 1989–2001, 2014
- Labels: Thick Records; Asian Man Records; MCA Records

Blue Meanies were an American ska-core band founded in Carbondale, Illinois, at Southern Illinois University, in 1989.

== History ==
=== Independent years ===
The Blue Meanies were formed in Carbondale, Illinois in 1989, where they emerged from the city's college party circuit in the early 1990s. The band made their recording debut in 1991 with the release of their first single, "Grandma Shampoo" c/w "Dickory Dock". Although their personnel was continuously changing, The Blue Meanies' sound would remain consistent throughout their first four albums, Peace Love Groove (1991), Pave The World (1992), Kiss Your Ass Goodbye (1995), Full Throttle (1997), and the live record Sonic Documentation Of Exhibition And Banter (1998).

The Blue Meanies took part in the 1998 Ska Against Racism tour.

=== MCA Records era ===
The band signed with MCA Records towards the end of the commercially successful third wave of ska, with a line-up consisting of John Paul Camp (III) (saxophone/ vocals), Sean Dolan (guitar), Jimmy Flame (trumpet/ vocals), Chaz Linde (keyboard/ vocal), Dave Lund (bass/ vocals), Billy Spunke (vocals/ megaphone), and Bob Trondson (drums). By this time, a total of twenty-two musicians had passed through the band since their formation, including Jay Vance, as a bass player, who went on to form the one-man metal band Captured! By Robots.

Their sixth full-length album, The Post Wave, released in late 2000 on MCA Records, was the most musically different from their other five albums. In 2001, the band regained the rights to The Post Wave and reissued it on Thick Records, their original record label.

The band ceased touring, though they never issued an official break-up statement.

=== Post-breakup ===
In the summer of 2004, it was confirmed that the Blue Meanies would temporarily revive the old tradition of the Winter Nationals. For years the Blue Meanies would have a show on December 23 in their hometown of Chicago. On December 22, 2004 the band played its first show in three years at Double Door with The Tossers and Cougars supporting. The next day the band played an all ages show at The Metro with Mu330, The Methadones, and New Black supporting. The Metro show was filmed with multiple cameras but no plans for a release of the footage have been announced.

The Blue Meanies reunited for Riot Fest 2006, an annual punk rock festival held in Chicago.

On May 13, 2014, the organizers of Riot Fest and Blue Meanies revealed that the band would reunite and perform at the Chicago version of the 2014 festival.

== Discography ==
Albums

- Peace Love Groove (1991) (live)
- Pave The World EP (1992)
- Kiss Your Ass Goodbye (Fuse Records, 1995—re-released by Asian Man Records, 1999)
- Full Throttle (Thick Records, 1997 / special edition re-released by Thick Records, 2005)
- Pigs EP (Thick Records, 1999)
- Sonic Documentation Of Exhibition And Banter Live! (Asian Man Records, 1999) (live)
- The Post Wave (MCA, 2000—re-released by Thick Records, 2001)

Vinyl

- Grandma Shampoo/Dickory Dock 7-inch (1992)
- Urine Trouble 7-inch (1994)
- Pave The World/F.O.R.D. 10-inch Picture Disc (1996)
- Blue Meanies/MU330 Split 7-inch (1998)
- Blue Meanies/Alkaline Trio split 7-inch picture disc (1999)

Compilations

- Take Warning: The Songs of Operation Ivy (Glue Factory, 1997)
- Magnetic Curses: A Chicago Punk Rock Compilation (Thick Records, 2000 re-released 2007)
- Skanarchy (Elevator Music, 2000)
- Living Tomorrow Today: A Benefit for Ty Cambra (Asian Man Records, 2001)
- Sex And Subversion: A Thick Records Document (Thick Records, 2003)
- Love and Rebellion (Thick Records, 2007)

Other

- Nude Ain't Crude cassette (1991)
