= Purgatory (The Tossers album) =

Studio album by The Tossers
- Released: March 25, 2003
- Genre: Celtic punk
- Length: 1:08:49
- Label: Thick Records

The Tossers chronology
Communication & Conviction: Last Seven Years (2001)	Purgatory (2003)	The Valley of the Shadow of Death (2005)

Professional ratings
Review scores
Source	Rating
Allmusic	link

Purgatory is Chicago Celtic punk band The Tossers fourth studio album. It was released in 2003 on Thick Records and was their last album with the label.

== Track listing ==
1. "With the North Wind/Here We Go Again" – 3:46
2. "The Ballad of the Thoughtful Rover" – 3:52
3. "Nantucket Girls Song" – 3:29
4. "Come Dancing" – 2:13
5. "Caoin (Lament)" – 3:34
6. "The Squall" – 4:25
7. "Chicago" – 6:51
8. "Monday Morning" – 3:37
9. "First League Out from Land" – 3:23
10. "Minutes on a Screen" – 5:38
11. "Purgatory" – 5:14
12. "Time to Go" – 4:08
13. "Memory" – 4:11
14. "Faraway" – 5:24
15. "Ni Thabharfaidh Siad Pingin Duit" – 0:57
16. "Going Away" – 8:07
- The song "Going Away" ends at 3:52. After 1 minute of silence, at 4:52 begins the hidden song "The Parting Glass".
