= Lauren Blauvelt =

Ohioan pro-choice political activist

- Born: 1987 or 1988 (age 38–39); Marietta, Ohio, U.S.
- Education: University of Cincinnati
- Known for: Abortion rights activism

Lauren Blauvelt (born 1987 or 1988 in Marietta, Ohio) is an American abortion rights activist and one of the main organizers working to get Ohio Issue 1, the Right to Make Reproductive Decisions Including Abortion Initiative on the ballot and then passed, enshrining the right to abortion in Ohio's constitution.

She is one of Time's 2024 100 Most influential People.

Columbus Monthly named her on its list of Inspiring Women, and Crain's Cleveland Business designated her a Person on the Move.

Blauvelt is the co-chair of Ohioans United for Reproductive Rights, the Executive Director of Planned Parenthood Advocates of Ohio, and the Chief Public Affairs officer for Planned Parenthood of Greater Ohio.

== Political activism ==
Time recognized Blauvelt for her "enormous commitment and energy to make a citizen ballot initiative like Issue 1 in Ohio, which enshrined the right to an abortion in the state constitution, a success".

Some of the work Blauvelt did for Issue 1 was speaking at rallies and nationally, such as on MSNBC. She helped amass 710,000 valid signatures to bring Issue 1 to the ballot, almost double the amount needed.

President Joe Biden and Vice President Kamala Harris supported Issue 1.

Blauvelt has been involved in other bills in Ohio, going on record opposing Senate Bill 157 Committee Activity in the Ohio Legislature.

== Education ==
Blauvelt is a graduate of the University of Cincinnati.
