= Long Dim Road =

Studio album by The Tossers
- Released: April 18, 2000
- Genre: Celtic punk
- Length: 44:28
- Label: Thick Records

The Tossers chronology
We'll Never Be Sober Again (1996)	Long Dim Road (2000)	Communication & Conviction: Last Seven Years (2001)

Professional ratings
Review scores
Source	Rating
AllMusic	4/5 stars
Daily Herald	3/4 stars

Long Dim Road is an album by the Chicago Celtic punk band The Tossers. It was released in 2000 on Thick Records, their first album with the label.

== Critical reception ==
AllMusic wrote: "Sweet, emotive ballads are half heartbreak, half hopeful resignation and showcase the strong songwriting that has a tendency to get buried in the more aggressive tracks." NPR wrote that "in 'The Pub', the words are alternately light and dark, commenting on barroom prophets and regulars, but the music is decidedly upbeat and energetic." The Chicago Reader thought that "on explosive rave-ups like 'The Crutch' or the pretty mug-clinking ditty 'The Last Night on Earth', the band's gleeful mix of tin whistle, violin, mandolin, piano, and rock instrumentation can turn the room of your choice into a raucous Irish pub."

== Track listing ==
1. "The Crutch" - 3:47
2. "Litigation" - 3:30
3. "A Night on Earth" - 3:49
4. "The Ballad of NATO" - 4:18
5. "Mad Riot" - 2:53
6. "Long Dim Road" - 1:24
7. "Altercations" - 2:56
8. "Wedding" - 3:35
9. "The Pub" - 4:32
10. "Doctrines Outdated" - 3:25
11. "Ciara" - 10:19
- The song "Ciara" end at 5:25. After 40 seconds of silence, at 6:05 begins the hidden song "Got Lucky".
