= Allardyce Nicoll =

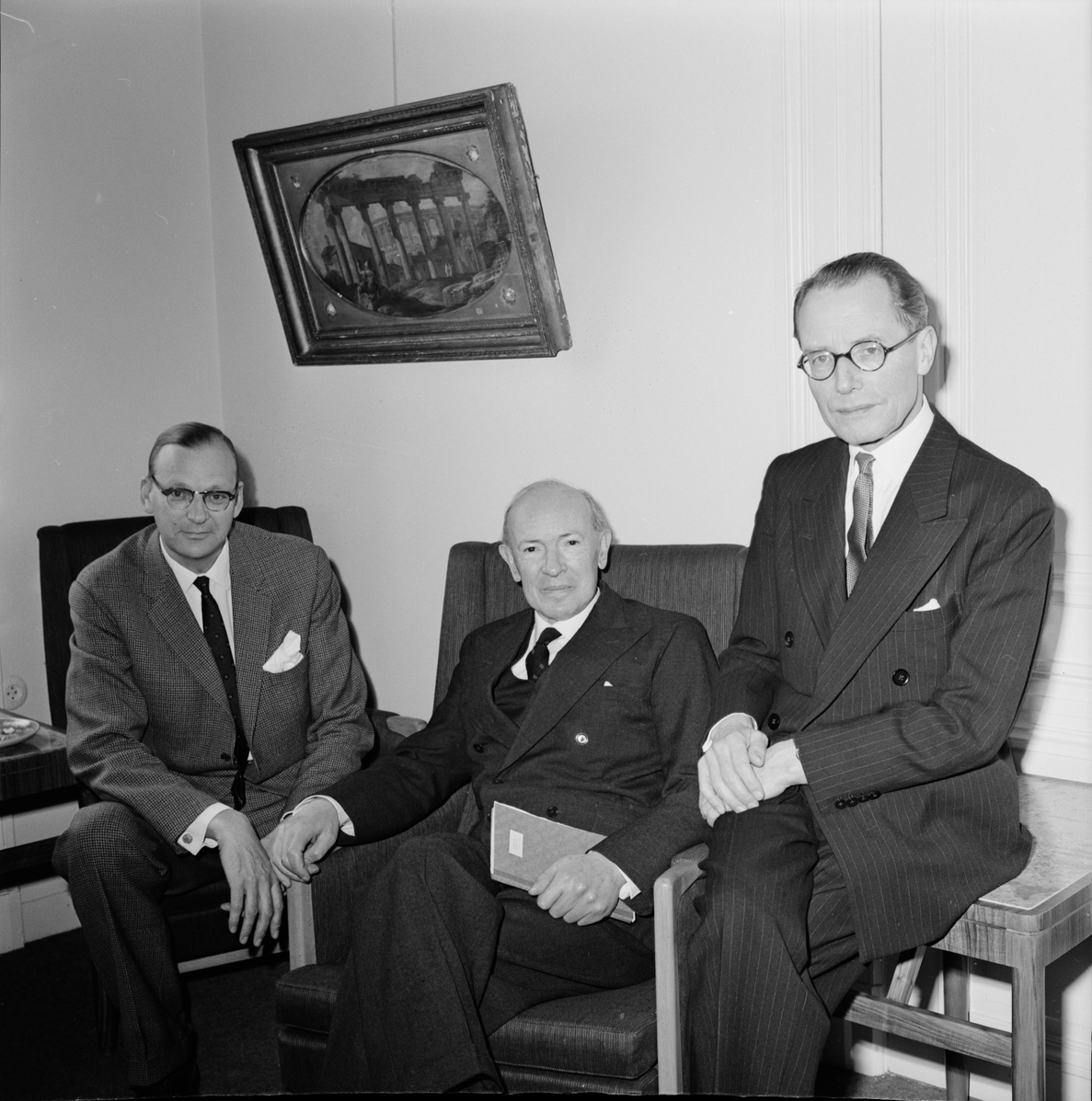
Allardyce Nicoll (middle) visiting Uppsala University in 1962. To his left, docent Lars Åhnebrink, to his right, professor A. Donner.

John Ramsay Allardyce Nicoll (28 June 1894 – 17 April 1976) was a Scottish literary scholar and teacher.

Allardyce Nicoll was born in Partick, Glasgow, and educated at Stirling High School and the University of Glasgow, where he was the G. A. Clark scholar in English. He became a lecturer at King's College London in 1920 and took the chair of English at East London College (later Queen Mary's College) in 1923. In 1933 he went to Yale University as professor of the history of drama and dramatic criticism and chair of the drama department. He established a strong graduate programme in theatre history. Around 1943–45 he performed war work at the British embassy in Washington. From 1945 to 1961 he headed the English Department at the University of Birmingham; from 1951 to 1961 he was also founding director of the Shakespeare Institute at Birmingham. He served as president of the Society for Theatre Research from 1958 to 1976.

== Research ==
His major work was his six-volume History of English Drama, 1660–1900, published as separate volumes starting in 1923, and reissued as a set in 1952–59. He also wrote many other books on English drama. He is credited with having made Restoration plays acceptable for scholarly study. When he began teaching in 1923, many colleges forbade Restoration drama on curricula because of its sometimes ribald topics and humorous examples of promiscuity. That changed in the course of the twentieth century.

Allardyce Nicoll's Film and Theatre (1936) offered a pioneering way of distinguishing live theatrical performance from films. Nicoll argues that live audiences always know they are being presented with an "illusion of reality; it is always imaginative illusion" (166). People watching films, on the other hand, tend to believe the camera is representing something real. Furthermore, he argues that the characters in stage plays often represent ‘types,’ but the people acting in films are widely believed to be ‘individuals.’ According to this theory, it follows that film actors can attain more sophisticated, deeper portrayals of human beings. Steve Dixon called Nicoll's early theories a "surprising anticipation of postmodern media theories as exemplified by Jean Baudrillard."

Beginning in 1948 and for many years in the 1950s, he edited the Cambridge University Press yearbook Shakespeare Survey. Nicoll had founded it upon his return to England after the war, with the Shakespeare Jahrbuch in mind as a general prototype, and the Survey soon developed into a respected international forum for Shakespeare criticism.

He later turned to Commedia dell'Arte, publishing what reviewer Jack Violi called a brilliant probe.

== Personal life ==
He was married twice and had no children.
