= Michael A. Weinstein =

American political philosopher

Michael A. Weinstein (August 24, 1942 – September 17, 2015) was an American political philosopher and political scientist, punk musician, and photography critic. He was a Guggenheim Fellow, Professor of Political Science at Purdue University, and the author or co-author of more than twenty books on a wide array of topics in philosophy. Weinstein also engaged in public political analysis, most notably in regard to the Somali civil war, but also the Unabomber and the Abu Ghraib torture and prisoner abuses.

== Philosophy ==
Weinstein's philosophical work addresses a variety of sub-fields and problems, including existentialism, American classical philosophy, vitalism, Mexican finalist ontology, virtue, and technology, among others. Arthur Kroker has referred to him as an American "Nietzsche for our times", and his work on American classical philosophy in The Wilderness and the City as a definitive commentary. While Weinstein's work is systematic, it is not systemic, offering instead a collection of methods and concepts with which one can evaluate their (and others') lived experience.

=== "Civil savage" ===
The "civil savage" is a concept found in Culture/Flesh, Weinstein's reflection on the human condition in "postcivilized modernity". According to Weinstein, modernity is a project aimed toward technological advancements, world mastery, and meaning creation that have continuously failed to overcome the fragility of our finite, mortal existence. Postmodernism has attempted to deconstruct modernity, but fails to truly find an effective substitute for the death of God and nihilism. The civil savage is a conceptual persona of the existentialist skeptic who adopts the life strategy of "erotic hedonism" and the motto of "everything is possible and nothing is necessary". In contrast to simple hedonism, erotic hedonism entails a conduct of the self-conscious direction of one's connections to others and the world (p. 54), and a cultivated disposition of "ironical devotion" and "active appreciation" toward the world (p. 68), without any illusions that such conduct will truly allow humanity to escape its finite existence.

=== Critical vitalism ===
Weinstein's primary philosophical project was a form of life philosophy which he referred to as "critical vitalism". While evolving over time, critical vitalism draws its initial inspiration from the classical vitalist philosophical tradition, including figures such as Henri Bergson. From classical vitalism, Weinstein adopts its "partisanship in favor of life", as well as (following Bergson's method of "intuition") its inquiry in the structure of lived experience of particular beings, "grasped from the inside" of that being's experience. Critical vitalism departs from classical vitalism in its avoidance of "metaphysical speculation" (such as the classical vitalist concept of élan vital), and the restriction of its inquiry to the evidence acquired from lived experience.

== Music ==
Weinstein was the lead singer and a songwriter for the Chicago-based punk band Vortis from 2000 to 2009. In his performative role as an "agitainer", he adopted the stage name of Fellow Traveler. Vortis released two albums with Weinstein as lead singer, Take the System Down and God Won't Bless America Again. Kurt Morris, one of the editors of the popular music website allmusic.com, described Weinstein's live stage performance as "... like a cross between Jello Biafra, Ice Cube, and Iggy Pop, at the live shows Weinstein can be found running around the stage, flipping people off, and yelling lines like, 'fuck, fuck, fuck, the human race.'

== Photography criticism ==
Weinstein began his work in photography criticism in 1990, publishing his first reviews in the Chicago-based Newcity magazine. His method of criticism was distinct in the inspiration it drew from the ideas of Italian philosopher Benedetto Croce, especially Croce's concept of "immanent criticism". Weinstein understood immanent criticism to require that

the critic should not come to a work or body of work with a set of standards or values that would then be applied to judge the work, but, instead, should seek to get inside the work and re-live it as the artist intended it to be experienced, if at all possible. Having followed that procedure to the best of his or her ability, the critic would then seek to express the experience of that work in words. The way I put it is that the work is a gift given to the viewer from the artist, and I want to honor that gift by experiencing it as much as possible as the artist wants me to appreciate it.

Viewing photography as a gift that allows access to the perspective and experiences of another person, Weinstein's method correspondingly advocates a form of criticism based in "appreciation" rather than negative judgment according to pre-existing metrics.

== Bibliography ==
=== Books ===
- Identity, Power and Change. Glenview: Scott, Foresman. 1970.
- Systematic Political Theory. Columbus: Charles E. Merrill. 1971.
- Philosophy, Theory and Method in Contemporary Political Thought. Glenview: Scott, Foresman. 1971.
- The Clash of Perspectives. Hinsdale: The Dryden Press. 1972. (with Deena Weinstein)
- The Political Experience. New York: St. Martin's Press. 1972.
- The Roles of Man. Hinsdale: The Dryden Press. 1972. (with Deena Weinstein)
- The Ideologies of Violence. Columbus: Charles E. Merrill. 1974. (with Kenneth Grundy)
- Living Sociology. New York: David Mckay. 1974. (with Deena Weinstein)
- Choosing Sociology. New York: David Mckay. 1976. (with Deena Weinstein)
- The Polarity of Mexican Thought: Instrumentalism and Finalism. Columbia: University of South Carolina Press. 1976.
- The Tragic Sense of Political Life. Columbia: University of South Carolina Press. 1977.
- Meaning and Appreciation: Time and Modern Political Life. West Lafayette: Purdue University Press. 1978.
- The Structure of Human Life: A Vitalist Ontology. New York: New York University Press. 1979.
- The Wilderness and the City: American Classical Philosophy as a Moral Quest. Amherst: University of Massachusetts Press. 1982.
- Unity and Variety in the Philosophy of Samuel Alexander. West Lafayette: Purdue University Press. 1984.
- Culture Critique: Fernand Dumont and New Quebec Sociology. Montreal: New World Perspectives. 1985.
- Finite Perfection: Reflections on Virtue. Amherst: University of Massachusetts Press. 1985.
- Postmodern(Ized) Simmel. London: Routledge. 1993. (with Deena Weinstein)
- Culture/Flesh: Explorations of Postcivilized Modernity. Lanham, MD: Rowman and Littlefield. 1995.
- Data Trash: The Theory of the Virtual Class. Montreal: New World Perspectives. 1994. (with Arthur Kroker)
- The Imaginative Prose of Oliver Wendell Holmes. Columbia: University of Missouri Press. 2006.
- Mind Unmasked: A Political Phenomenology of Consciousness. New York: Routledge. 2018. (with Timothy M. Yetman)
