= Sullen =

Sullen may refer to:

- Sullen (band), an American punk rock band
- Edward Sullen, a fictional character in the 2010 film Vampires Suck
- Squire Sullen and Kate Sullen, fictional characters in the 1707 play The Beaux' Stratagem

== See also ==
- Depression (mood)
- Sullens, a municipality of Vaud, Switzerland
