= The Lost Revival =

American indie rock band

The Lost Revival is an indie rock band from Columbus, Ohio. Formed in the Fall of 2005, membership changed several times before the band recorded its first album, Homemade Confetti, in the Summer of 2007. Band membership changed again before work began on the second album, which has yet to be released.

The band is noticeable for its atypically large and variable size, with as many as nine performers on stage at any one time, and as few as four. The band describes its sound as “bastardized Americana.” The term was coined by drummer John Thorne when the band had trouble describing their sound, a mix of folk-rock and electronic noise.

== History ==
=== Formation ===
The band began with members Kevin Collins, Daniel Kirschenbaum, and Benjamin Peyton. When Collins’ and Kirschenbaum's house was burglarized in 2005, they lost some of their original equipment, including Collins’ childhood guitar and several microphones. After recovering some funds from insurance, the band purchased a synthesizer and a drum machine. Collins and Kirschenbaum largely credit this burglary and their subsequent instrument purchases for the creation of the band as it is now. The band began performing in Columbus in early 2006, making their debut at Larry's Bar. After a hiatus during the second half of 2006, The Lost Revival came back in 2007 with a different membership. Austin Caulk, Marty Boone, Joe Dewitt, and Brad Wilson joined Collins and Kirschenbaum in the band. According to Collins, everyone in the band is a multi-instrumentalist, and band members frequently change instruments throughout a show.

=== Name ===
Originally called “Youngstown Tune-Up,” the band changed its name to “The Lost Revival” the day before its first record went to press. The band announced the change in a blog post on January 9, 2008, to its MySpace. Chris DeVille of Columbus Alive writes that the name change reflects singer/songwriter Collins’ “fixation on religious themes” in the music he writes. DeVille also writes that the band's name change may have been one of the most important in its history, and that the new name sounds “more dignified.”

=== Homemade Confetti ===
The Lost Revival announced that production of its first album, Homemade Confetti, was finished in a January 9, 2008 blog post to its MySpace. The band recorded the album in one weekend in the summer of 2007 with producer and sound engineer Jay Alton at Relay Recording in Columbus, Ohio. The album was recorded on the Columbus independent label, Champions of the Arts. The album was officially released in April 2008. Prior to the release of the album, The Lost Revival gained drummer and videographer John Thorne. The album's title came from an incident at a show on Collins’ birthday. Collins reportedly had torn up bits of a newspaper's obituaries in his pocket, and began to throw the newspaper, yelling “Homemade confetti!”

The announcement of its upcoming album earned The Lost Revival a show at Galapagos Art Space in New York City, the band's first show outside of Columbus, Ohio. After the band's CD release party for Homemade Confetti, the band continued to play around Columbus through mid-July 2008. During this time, Homemade Confetti was reviewed by Dave Schaefer of Life on the C-Bus, a local music site for Columbus, Ohio. Schaefer gave the album four out of five buses, and likens the album to “a mix of Johnny Cash, Bob Dylan and Mike Ness.” Schaefer also describes Collins’ vocals as “cigarette-tuned.” This earned The Lost Revival another show in New York City, at Arlene's Grocery. As The Lost Revival continued to play around Ohio, Homemade Confetti continued to get reviewed. L. Anne Carrington gave the album four out of five stars in September 2008. David Smith of Delusions of Adequacy reviewed the album in October 2008. Joel Oliphint of Columbus’ The Other Paper reviewed the album in November 2008. In December 2008, Oliphint named Homemade Confetti as one of the top ten Columbus albums of 2008 on his blog, “Don’t just do something, stand there.” In January 2009, Chris DeVille of Columbus Alive named Homemade Confetti one of the best Columbus debut albums of 2008.

=== Summerfest and the United Nations ===
As The Lost Revival gained notoriety, it was entered into a contest to play at local radio station CD101's Summerfest with other notable indie rock bands VHS or Beta, Dr. Dog, Darker My Love, Honey Honey, Ism, and Tickle Me Pink. The contest was decided by CD101 listeners’ votes by text message. The band won the opening spot at the show, held at the LC Pavilion in Columbus on August 23, 2008. The Lost Revival was offered to play at the United Nations Correspondents Association Awards Ceremony, and accepted the December 4, 2008 show for the band's third trip to play in New York City. The band finished out the year performing live for CD101's Andyman-a-thon.

=== To Hell With Them All ===
The Lost Revival recorded five songs for their second album in December 2008 at Sonic Lounge Studios with producer and engineer Jay Alton. The band had previously recorded demos of these five songs at Rokcity Studios with CD101 DJ Mike Folker.

In January, 2010 the Lost Revival resumed work on the second half of "To Hell With Them All" at Sonic Lounge Studios. They plan to release the second full-release in March, 2010.

== Personnel ==
The current line-up for The Lost Revival is Kevin Collins (lead vocals, keyboard, guitar), Daniel Kirschenbaum (guitars, keyboard, vocals), Brad Wilson (bass guitar, vocals), Joe Dewitt (synthesizers, keyboard), and Chris Cheeseman (drumset, percussion). Former members are Benjamin Peyton (keyboard), John Thorne (drums, percussion, keyboard), Austin Caulk (percussion, guitar, drumset), and Marty Boone (keyboard).

== Discography ==
Homemade Confetti (2008)

To Hell With Them All (2010)

The Greatest Scam Ever Pulled (2012)

== Press ==
"Homemade Confetti, which was reportedly recorded in one weekend, doesn’t sound the least bit like a rush job. It’s a big record, with lots of atmospheric layering in the background, providing a thick blanket in which to wrap Kevin Collins’s throaty vocals—which make him sound like a less lackadaisical, sea urchin-swallowing version of the Black Swans’ Jerry DeCicca."-Joel Oliphint, The Other Paper
"The songs are warm and folksy combined with cold and spooky and some bluesy rock symphony thrown in....Kevin Collins sings with a smoky-tuned affection, accompanied by the band’s confetti of guitars, keyboards, and percussion unfolding behind him."-L. Anne Carrington, Indie Music Stop
"Homemade Confetti’s Americana stomps and boozes its way through 10 tracks of pleading confessionals....It all points to Lost Revival’s attempts to break out of the cardboard, one-dimensional approaches taken by the glut of Wilco wannabes."-David Smith, Delusions of Adequacy
"Homemade Confetti is brimming with sounds, and the warm and folksy often coexist with the cold and spooky. Collins sings with gruff affectation, evoking a little Win Butler and a lot of Bob Dylan, as the band's bluster of guitars, keyboards and percussion swells behind him."-Chris DeVille, Columbus Alive
"The group’s trademark party environment even led to its debut album title."-Michael Punsalin, Toledo Free Press
