= Architects (American band) =

American rock band

- Origin: Kansas City, Missouri, U.S.
- Genres: Rock
- Years active: 2004–present
- Labels: Anodyne, Skeleton Crew
- Members: Brandon Phillips; Adam Phillips; Zach Phillips
- Past members: Mike Alexander; Keenan Nichols; Adrianne Verhoven
- Website: thearchitectsrock.com

Architects are an American rock band from Kansas City, Missouri. The band was formed by previous members of the punk and ska band The Gadjits, brothers Brandon, Adam, and Zach Phillips, and Mike Alexander.

== History ==
After releasing four albums from 1996 to 2002, The Gadjits signed with RCA Records and were in the process of recording their fifth album, Our Time To... (which has never been released) when RCA suddenly dropped them following a merger with Jive Records. Following the band being dropped, Brandon Philips said "we were tired of dragging around the baggage that comes with still being called The Gadjits after many years. So we just killed The Gadjits and became a new thing; that's it." In June 2004 the Gadjits ceased to exist as a band and a new band, Architects, was formed along with Mike Alexander, the guitarist for The Gadjits. "We basically had to start at zero. … All the touring we'd done as The Gadjits suddenly just didn't matter at all, and all the records we sold didn't matter; nothing we'd ever done before mattered. We were basically just a group of dudes with guitars, so we had to start completely fresh and rebuild everything" Brandon Phillips said. The band's debut album, Keys to the Building, was released on the Anodyne label in 2004. Revenge followed in 2006, described by Allmusic as " a solid rock offering with enough soul and punk urgency to keep things interesting from start to finish", and Vice in 2008. Keenan Nichols had replaced Alexander in October 2007. They subsequently signed to Frank Iero's Skeleton Crew label.

In 2013 they started releasing the Border Wars graphic novel/EP series, on which they worked with illustrator Mallory Dorn.

== Musical style and influences ==
The Tucson Weekly described the band's music as "a dynamic, explosive combination of traditional punk, maximum R&B, Midwestern alternative rock, blues-based metal and pop melodies". They were described as "dirty rock & roll tinged with Southern heart and gritty, passionate attitude" by AllMusic.

The band's lyrical themes include friendship and politics.

Their influences include AC/DC, Bruce Springsteen, and Meat Loaf.

== Band members ==
- Adam Phillips – drums (2004–present)
- Brandon Phillips – lead vocals/rhythm guitar (2004–present)
- Zach Phillips – bass guitar/backing vocals (2004–present)

Former members

- Mike Alexander – guitar (2004–2007)
- Keenan Nichols – lead guitar/backing vocals (2007–2014)
- Adrianne Verhoven – keyboards (2004, 2009–2010)

== Discography ==
=== Albums ===
- Keys to the Building (October 2004), Anodyne
- Revenge (March 2006), Anodyne
- Vice (May 2008), Anodyne
- The Hard Way (June 2009), Skeleton Crew
- Live in Los Angeles (October 2012), Skeleton Crew
- Border Wars Episodes I & II (2017), Gran Cala Vera/Wolffang Funk

=== EPs ===
- Border Wars Ep 1 (April 25, 2014)
- Border Wars Ep 2 (September 9, 2013)

• Border Wars Episode 3 (2022), Gran Calavera

=== Compilation appearances ===
- "Promises" included on First Blood (2007), OxBlood

== Awards ==
- Best Band of Kansas City, 2006
