= Jim DeRogatis =

American music critic and podcast host (born 1964)

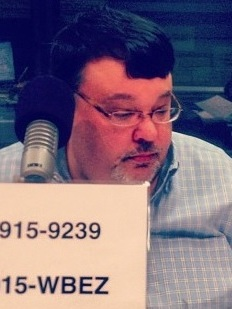
- DeRogatis at WBEZ in 2012.
- Born: James Peter DeRogatis; September 2, 1964 (age 62); Jersey City, New Jersey, U.S.
- Education: New York University
- Occupation: Music critic
- Spouse: Carmél Carrillo (m. 2003)
- Children: 1
- Writing career
- Years active: 1980s–present
- Subjects: Rock music (alternative, punk, indie, psychedelic)
- Website: jimdero.com

James Peter DeRogatis (born September 2, 1964, New Jersey, U.S.) is an American music critic and co-host of Sound Opinions. DeRogatis has written articles for magazines such as Rolling Stone, Spin, Guitar World, Matter and Modern Drummer, and for 15 years was the pop music critic for the Chicago Sun-Times.

He joined Columbia College Chicago's English Department as a lecturer in 2010 but is now a lecturer at Northwestern University's Medill School of Journalism, Media, Integrated Marketing Communications.

== Career ==
In 1982, while a senior at Hudson Catholic Regional High School in Jersey City, New Jersey, DeRogatis conducted one of the last interviews with rock critic Lester Bangs, two weeks before Bangs's death of a drug overdose. Over a decade later, this encounter would serve as the beginning and inspiration for DeRogatis's Lester Bangs biography Let It Blurt.

Attending on a scholarship, DeRogatis attended New York University majoring in journalism and minoring in sociology. As a junior, DeRogatis began writing for the Hoboken Reporter, first as a music columnist before adding city government to his reporting duties. In 1985, at the start of his senior year, DeRogatis began writing full time for the Jersey Journal, spending two nights a week on news stories and three days on wedding and church announcements.

After living in Minneapolis to manage a friend's band and do freelance music writing, DeRogatis first joined the Chicago Sun-Times in 1992; he left in 1995 to join Rolling Stone magazine, a job that lasted eight months, and was back at the Sun-Times in three years. While at Rolling Stone magazine, he was fired after writing a negative review of Hootie & the Blowfish's album Fairweather Johnson. The review irked Rolling Stone publisher Jann Wenner who had it pulled from publication. DeRogatis's employment with the magazine was terminated after he revealed this incident to the public.

DeRogatis hosts Sound Opinions with fellow music critic Greg Kot. The radio talk show is heard on Chicago Public Radio and nationally syndicated by American Public Media and is available as a podcast. The program is one of the longest running talk radio shows focusing exclusively on rock music with stints on both Chicago's WXRT and an early incarnation on Q101 featuring Bill Wyman from the Chicago Reader in place of Greg Kot. The move to Chicago Public Radio took place on December 3, 2005.

DeRogatis plays drums in the punk rock band Vortis; its most recent album (Spring 2019) is This Machine Kills Fascists on Cavetone Records. He previously played in the bands the Ex-Lion Tamers (Wire cover band), Airlines, Speed the Plough, and The Shotdowns. Vortis has released two albums and a third is due to be released soon.

=== Ryan Adams ===
DeRogatis became known also for a scathing review of a Ryan Adams show in Chicago, which prompted Adams to leave a "grumpy" message on DeRogatis's answering machine, in which he blasted DeRogatis for seeming to desire criticizing the artist, not the music. Adams later commented that DeRogatis should not have made the recording public, and that leaving the message in the first place was a mistake since it empowered the critic.

=== R. Kelly ===
DeRogatis and Abdon Pallasch reported for the Chicago Sun-Times in December 2000 that court records and interviews alleged that musician R. Kelly had used his position of fame and influence to meet and have sex with underage girls. DeRogatis and Pallasch reported in February 2002 that a videotape had surfaced allegedly featuring Kelly engaging in sex with a 14-year-old girl. As a Sun-Times music critic, DeRogatis had received the videotape and subsequently turned it over to police.

DeRogatis was named as a witness in Kelly's 2008 child pornography trial. The defense lawyers charged that DeRogatis should be charged with possession of child pornography for allegedly making a copy of the tape and showing it to another person after turning the original over to police.

After initially failing to appear for the trial, DeRogatis was ordered by Judge Vincent Gaughan on May 30, 2008, to report to the trial the following day. However, upon questioning by Judge Gaughan outside of the presence of the jury, DeRogatis refused to provide substantive answers, citing his First and Fifth Amendment rights as the basis for his refusal. Judge Gaughan disagreed that as a journalist DeRogatis had a First Amendment basis for refusing to testify, but excused DeRogatis from taking the stand in front of the jury based upon his Fifth Amendment right not to incriminate himself.

On July 17, 2017, DeRogatis reported for BuzzFeed News that Kelly had been accused by three sets of parents of holding their daughters in an "abusive cult". Kelly released a song discussing the allegations against him and criticizing DeRogatis in 2018 titled "I Admit".

The result of 19 years of reporting, his book, Soulless: The Case Against R. Kelly, was published by Abrams Press on June 4, 2019.

== Personal life ==
DeRogatis was born and raised in Jersey City, New Jersey, in a Catholic family. When he was five, in 1969, his father, an underwriter for the Prudential Insurance Company, died of a heart attack. After rejecting religion during his freshman year of high school, DeRogatis became an atheist. In 2003, DeRogatis married Carmél Carrillo. He has a daughter, Melody (born c. 1997), from a previous marriage.

== Bibliography ==
- Let It Blurt: The Life and Times of Lester Bangs, America's Greatest Rock Critic, Broadway Books, 2000
- Milk It!: Collected Musings on the Alternative Music Explosion of the '90s, Da Capo Press, 2003
- Turn on Your Mind: Four Decades of Great Psychedelic Rock, Hal Leonard Publishing Co., 2003
- Kill Your Idols: A New Generation of Rock Writers Reconsiders the Classics, Da Capo Press, 2004
- Staring at Sound: The True Story of Oklahoma's Fabulous The Flaming Lips, Broadway Books, 2006
- The Velvet Underground: An Illustrated History of a Walk on the Wild Side, Voyageur Press, 2009
- Soulless: The Case Against R. Kelly (Updated and expanded ed.). New York: Abrams Press. 2019. ISBN 9781683357629. OCLC 1083222280.
