= Vortis (band) =

American punk rock band

- Origin: Chicago
- Genres: Punk rock
- Years active: 2000–present
- Labels: Cavetone Records
- Members: Jim DeRogatis, Tony Tavano, Louie Calvano
- Past members: Mike Weinstein, Chris Martiniano, Randy Kertz
- Website: www.cavetonerecords.com/vortis.html

Vortis is an American indie punk band established in 2000, whose members initially included Michael A. Weinstein, the band's frontman and a professor of political science at Purdue University, as well as well-known music critic Jim DeRogatis (who remains the band's drummer). The band was named after the Vorticist movement of the early 20th-century, a group of artists and writers whose basic tenet was the "perpetuate violent structures of adolescent clarity" throughout life. (As DeRogatis puts it, "To live with the lust for life of a teenager, no matter what age you are—a great definition of rock 'n' roll half a century before it happened.") The group (completed by guitarist Tony Tavano, aka G Haad, and bassist Chris Martiano, aka Johnny Los, who replaced early member Randy Kertz) initially released two albums with Weinstein, pairing its music to his lyrics: Take the System Down, and God Won't Bless America, both on the independent Thick Records. Several other independent recordings followed with Weinstein before he left the group in 2009; he died at age 73 in 2015 but the group continues as a trio.

== Reception ==
Their sound has been described as eclectic, and they have been compared to the Dead Kennedys, Wire and the Butthole Surfers. In particular, some critics have drawn comparisons between Weinstein's demeanor in live performances to Jello Biafra's persona. John Petkovic of the Cleveland Plain Dealer described the sound of God Won't Bless America as "a mix of both - music and cheerleading, that is." The Columbus Dispatch said that "Musically, they fall into the netherlands where metal, 'Oi' punk, hard core and Mr. Bungle tread". Monica Kendrick of the Chicago Reader wrote of the 2005 album "Warzone" that it is "mean, tight, righteously pissed, and full of hooky, nasty sloganeering choruses—and if you're like me you might relish the frisson of hearing yourself chanting them. Of the current trio, the Webzine Razorcake wrote, "The brevity of the Ramones, with an occasional Big Black abrasiveness, and the aggressiveness of Dead Boys."

== History ==
Weinstein joined Vortis in 2000 when his wife introduced him to several musicians several decades his juniors from Chicago. Weinstein also went by the stage name "Fellow Traveler" when performing with Vortis, though the band and many fans affectionately referred to him as "the Professor." The group released its debut album, Take the System Down, on Thick Records in 2002, followed by God Won't Bless America the following year, also on Thick Records.

The group continued for some time as a quartet after Weinstein left the band, with Louie Calvano joining and alternating on guitar and bass with Martiniano. Several more indie recordings followed, then Martiniano left as well to pursue his scholarly studies of William Blake, and the band has been a trio ever since, with Tavano, DeRogatis, and Calvano gigging frequently in and around Chicago. Most of the songs are now written as a group, maintaining the political and sociological edge inspired by Weinstein, but with a short, sharp aesthetic that owes a debt to Wire and Chicago punk avatars such as Naked Raygun, as well as Hüsker Dü. The band's latest album was released by the vinyl-only Cavetone Records label. in Spring 2019. This Machine Kills Fascists is also streaming on Spotify, Bandcamp, and iTunes, and in addition to the title's nod to Woody Guthrie and a reinterpretation of a song he wrote about Fred Trump, lyrics reference and draw inspiration from George Orwell and Bill McKibben.

Vortis also released a split 7-inch in 2011 entitled "Things Won't Get Better", with the Cathy Santonies.

== Discography ==
- Take the System Down (Thick, 2002)
- God Won't Bless America (Thick, 2003)
- Warzone (self-released, 2005)
- Vortis (self-released, 2009)
- Things Won’t Get Better (split 7-inch with the Cathy Santonies, 2011)
- Modern Savage (self-released, 2013)
- Safety First (self-released, 2014)
- This Machine Kills Fascists (Cavetone Records, 2019)
- The Miasmic Years (Cavetone Records, 2022)
