= Agony (The Tossers album) =

Studio album by The Tossers
- Released: March 7, 2007
- Genre: Celtic punk
- Length: 48:28
- Label: Victory Records

The Tossers chronology
The Valley of the Shadow of Death (2005)	Agony (2007)	Gloatin' and Showboatin': Live on St. Patrick's Day (2008)

Professional ratings
Review scores
Source	Rating
Allmusic	3.5/5 stars

Agony is the sixth studio album by American Celtic punk band The Tossers. It was released on March 7, 2007 by Victory Records. It is their second release on the label.

== Track listing ==
1. "Never Enough" – 3:08
2. "Pub And Culture" – 2:58
3. "Shade" – 1:54
4. "Did It All For You" – 1:51
5. "The Sheep In The Boots" – 3:26
6. "Not Forgotten" – 3:31
7. "Siobhan" – 2:08
8. "Traps And Ultimatums" – 2:35
9. "Leopardstown Races" – 5:44
10. "Claddagh" – 1:55
11. "Where Ya Been Johnny?" – 2:30
12. "Not Alone" – 3:44
13. "Political Scum" – 2:55
14. "Romany" – 1:44
15. "Movin' On" – 3:41
16. "The Nut House" – 2:29
17. "Be" – 2:15
