= Horace Pinker =

American punk rock band

- Origin: Tempe, Arizona, United States Chicago, Illinois, United States (based in)
- Genres: Punk rock, punk pop, indie rock
- Years active: 1991–present
- Labels: People of Punk Rock; Jump Start; Arctic Rodeo; OffTime; Thick; JumpUp!
- Members: Greg Mytych; Bryan Jones; Scott Eastman
- Past members: Bill Ramsey; Don Meehleis; Chris Bauermeister; Matt Arluck; Miguel Barron; Karl Eifrig; Jeff Dean; Jonathan Richardson; Jesse Everhart; Gregg Dessen
- Website: Official site

Horace Pinker is an American punk rock band formed in 1991 in Tempe, Arizona and based in Chicago, Illinois. They combine a pop-punk sound with political lyrics.

Horace Pinker has toured internationally, playing in countries including Brazil, China, and Australia. They have performed at numerous festivals, including the Dynamo Open Air in the Netherlands, Belgium's Groezrock festival, the 2007 Vans Zona Punk Tour in Brazil, PouzzaFest in Montreal, and The Fest in Gainesville, Florida.

The band has appeared on numerous compilation albums, including a split EP with Face to Face and the notable Fat Wreck Chords compilation Fat Music for Fat People. Their music videos were featured on the DVD compilations Cinema Beer Nuts and Punk Broadcast System.

They have toured for the releases of Power Tools (Justice), Burn Tempe To The Ground (One foot), Pop Culture Failure (Jump Up!), Copper Regret (Cold front), Red-Eyed Regular (Off Time), Texas One Ten (Thick), Carnival Nostalgia: 2000-2006 (Enemy One) and 2011's Local State Inertia (Jump Start, Arctic Rodeo/Off Time).

In 2010, the band toured China, Singapore, Australia and New Zealand. The same year, they recorded the follow-up to their 2005 album Texas One Ten.

After a tour of Canada in August 2011, they released their new record Local State Inertia in October 2011 followed by a European tour in March 2012. The US release for Local State Inertia was in November 2012 on Jump Start Records.

Playing shows to promote their new album throughout 2012 and 2013, they shared the stage with bands including Iron Chic. By 2015, Horace Pinker had released the critically acclaimed EP Recover on Dead Broke Rekerds. They did a series of shows in the Midwest and a homecoming show in Tempe in support of the release.

In 2018, they played with Unwritten Law on their 25th anniversary tour and began to plan and record House of Cards. Delayed due to the pandemic and released as an EP in 2022, these recordings, done at Sonic Iguana with Mass Giorgini, set the stage for more touring, including a spot at Pouzza Fest in 2023, and for their latest album, Now and the Future.

In October 2025, Horace Pinker embarked on a tour of the Southeast, capped off by an appearance at Fest 23 in Gainesville.

== Members ==
=== Current ===
- Greg Mytych - bass, vocals
- Bryan Jones - drums (founding member)
- Scott Eastman - guitar, vocals (founding member)
- Don Meehleis - guitar, vocals

=== Former ===
- Bill Ramsey - drums (founding member)
- Miguel Barron - bass (Deminer, Armchair Martian)
- Matt Arluck - guitar (Deminer, Sweet Cobra)
- Chris Bauermeister - bass (Jawbreaker)
- Jesse Everhart - guitar
- Jonathan Richardson - guitar/bass (Early Day Miners)
- Gregg Dessen - bass (founding member)
- Karl Eifrig - bass (Lynyrd's Innards, Mexican Cheerleader)
- Jeff Dean - guitar (The Bomb, All Eyes West, Noise By Numbers)

== Discography ==
- Recipe for Money Split EP w/Face to Face (1993, Rhetoric Records)
- Powertools (1994, Earwax/Justice)
- Burn Tempe to the Ground (1996, Onefoot)
- Copper Regret EP (2000, Coldfront)
- Pop Culture Failure (2000, Jump Up!)
- Red-Eyed Regular EP (2003, OffTime Records)
- Texas One Ten (2005, Thick)
- Carnival Nostalgia: 2000-2006 (2007, Enemy One Records)
- Local State Inertia (2011, Arctic Rodeo Recordings)
- Local State Inertia (2012, Jump Start Records)
- Recover EP (2015, Dead Broke Rekerds)
- House of Cards EP (2022, OffTime Records)
- Now and the Future (2025, People of Punk Rock Records)
