= Cougars (band) =

American rock band

- Origin: Chicago, Illinois, U.S.
- Genres: Post-punk, post-hardcore, rock, noise rock
- Years active: 2000–present
- Labels: Go-Kart Records; Thick Records; Expert Works Records
- Members: Bryan Bienias; Matt Irie; John McClurg; Fred Popolo; Brian Wnukowski
- Past members: Sam Ambrosini; Mark Beening; Jeff Vidmont; Brett Meingasner
- Website: https://cougs.bandcamp.com/

Cougars is an American, Chicago-based rock band formed in 2000.

The band signed to the New York-based label Go-Kart Records in 2003 and embarked on several extensive US and European tours. Cougars' music is often compared to that of The Jesus Lizard and Rocket from the Crypt. The band avoids categorizing themselves in interviews; they've claimed to be simply "a rock band with horns" and "a rock band making rock music."

The band released its second studio album, Pillow Talk in 2006.

In 2007, the band parted ways with saxophonist Jeff Vidmont and trumpet player Mark Beening. In 2008, keyboardist Sam Ambrosini left the band.

Through most of the 2010s, the band continued to write and play sporadic shows in Chicago.

In 2022, the band parted ways with guitarist Brett Meingasner. To maintain its trademark brand of two-guitar whoopass, Bienias moved from bass to guitar and Cougars added the veteran Fred Popolo (former Haymarket Riot), on bass.

In early 2023, the reconstituted five-piece (without keyboards or horn section) began recording its third album with engineer Shane Hochstetler at Electrical Audio in Chicago, Illinois, and Howl Street Recording in Milwaukee, Wisconsin. Several rough mixes ended up in the hands of Justin Nardy, owner of Expert Work Records from Columbia, Missouri, who agreed to sign the band. On August 4, 2023, the band released its third LP, Cougs.

== Band members ==
Current:

- Bryan Bienias - Bass (2000–2022), Guitar (2022–Present)
- Matt Irie - Vocals
- John McClurg - Guitar
- Fred Popolo - Bass
- Brian Wnukowski - Drums

Former:

- Sam Ambrosini - Keyboards (2000–2008)
- Mark Beening - Trumpet (2000–2007)
- Brett Meingasner - Guitar (2000–2022)
- Jeff Vidmont - Saxophone (2000–2008)

== Discography ==
- Nice, Nice (2003), Go Kart Records
- Manhandler EP (2004), Thick Records
- Pillow Talk (2005 in Europe, 2006 in North America), Go Kart Records
- Cougs (2023), Expert Work Records
