= Sound Opinions =

- Genre: Music talk
- Running time: 54 minutes
- Country of origin: United States
- Home station: WCRX
- Syndicates: Public Radio Exchange
- TV adaptations: WTTW (PBS)
- Hosted by: Jim DeRogatis and Greg Kot
- Produced by: Alex Claiborne; Andrew Gill
- Original release: 1993 – present
- Website: www.soundopinions.org

Sound Opinions is an independent radio talk show and podcast based in Chicago. It focuses on the discussion of music genres, history, artists and albums. It airs weekly on over 150 public radio stations nationwide and is syndicated though the Public Radio Exchange. It is also available for download and streaming worldwide as a podcast.

The show is hosted by Jim DeRogatis and Greg Kot and features interviews with musicians and industry figures as well as dissections of classic albums and musical movements. Kot and DeRogatis also review recent record releases and share under-the-radar albums they call "Buried Treasures." Sound Opinions is an independent production, produced by Alex Claiborne and Andrew Gill.

Sound Opinions was adapted for television by WTTW in Chicago.

== History ==
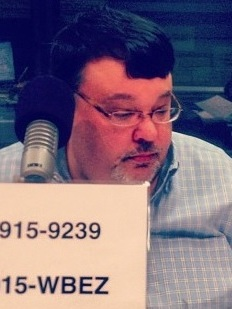
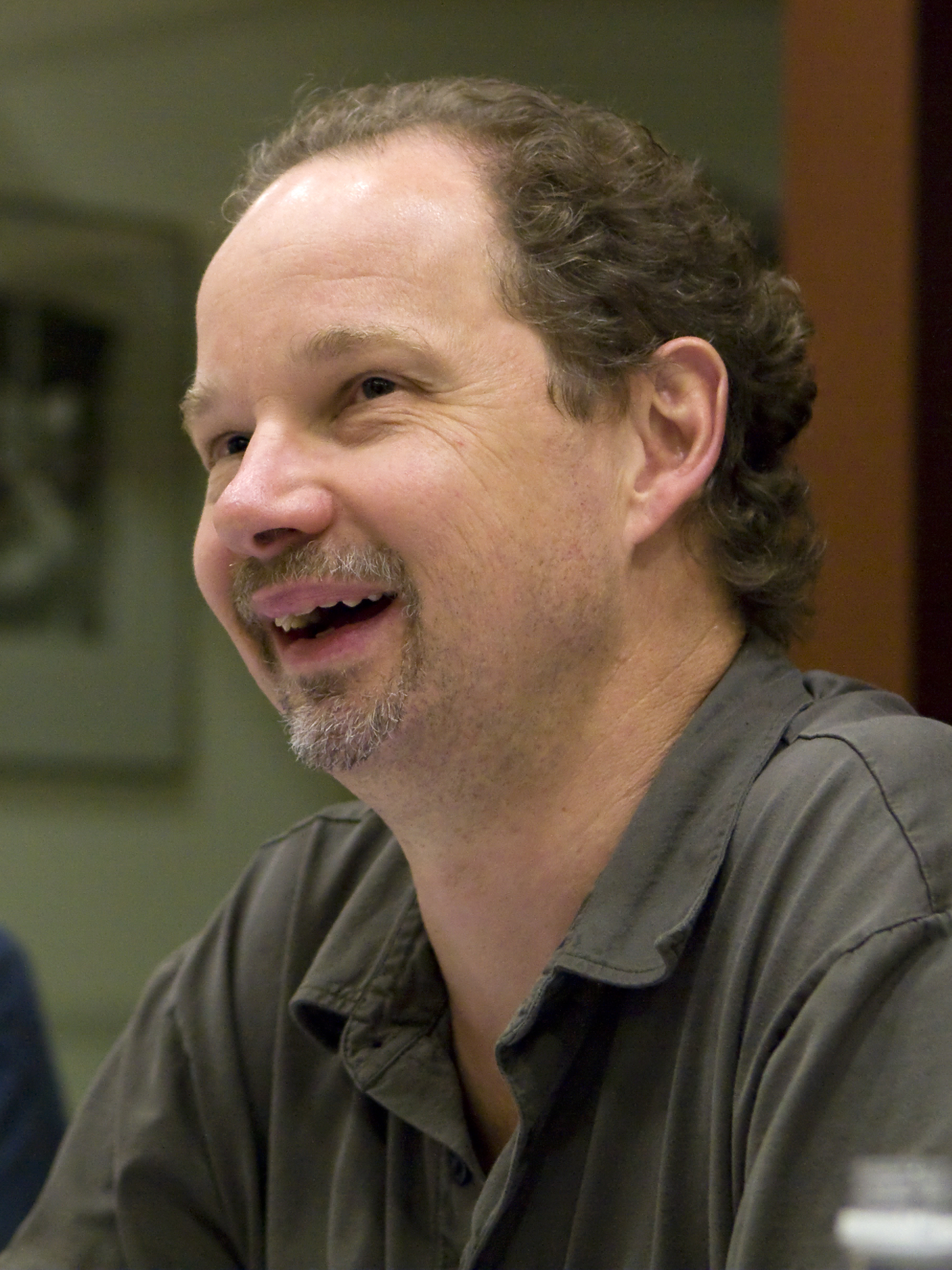
Jim DeRogatis and Greg Kot

Sound Opinions began life as a regular feature on Ed Schwartz's overnight program on WLUP-AM in 1993 featuring then Chicago Sun Times music critic Jim DeRogatis and Bill Wyman who was the rock critic for the Chicago Reader at that time. It was then given its own time-slot on Sunday afternoons following the Sunday Funnies, a comedy program hosted by Brian McCann. In 1994 it moved to Q101. The show ended in 1995 when DeRogatis joined Rolling Stone. It was reincarnated on WXRT with Kot replacing Wyman in 1998. In 2005 after 354 shows it moved to WBEZ. It was distributed nationally by American Public Media and was also available as a podcast.

On July 1, 2010, the program switched distributors from APM to the Public Radio Exchange, a web-based distribution outlet for public radio programs, the first ongoing series to leave one of the big three satellite-delivered public radio program distributors for PRX.

On June 15, 2020, WBEZ announced that it would end its production deal with Sound Opinions. As of September 1, 2020, Sound Opinions has existed as an independent production based at Columbia College Chicago. They fund the show through ads, sponsorships and donations.

== Message board ==
The Sound Opinions Message Board, also known as "the SOMB," attracted music aficionados. Its users, or "SOMBies," discussed music, the Chicago scene, pop culture, politics, and occasionally their personal lives. Annual "Best Of" lists were also regularly compiled.

While it is no longer in operation, there is a Sound Opinions discussion group on Facebook that serves a similar function.
