= The Gadjits =

American ska and rock and roll band

- Origin: Kansas City, Missouri, U.S.
- Genres: Ska punk, rocksteady, rock and roll
- Years active: 1995–2004
- Labels: Joco Ska, Hellcat Records, Thick Records, RCA Records, Anodyne Records
- Past members: Brandon Phillips; Zach Phillips; Adam Phillips; Heidi Blobaum; Hilary Allen; Ehren Starks; Mike Alexander; Adrianne Verhoven

The Gadjits were an American ska and rock and roll band from Kansas City, Missouri, United States.

== History ==
=== The Gadjits ===
Brandon, Zach, and Adam Phillips come from an artistic family, their father was a jazz musician and their mother an art teacher. The brothers learned to play guitar at a fine-arts camp.

Brandon was in various bands with his friends which made his younger brothers jealous so in 1991 they got a friend of theirs and they started their own band which Brandon ended up writing songs for and eventually joined. Their friend would quit shortly after and Brandon, who was 14, along with his brothers Zach and Adam, who was just 9 years old at the time, would continue on, performing in local bars. Brandon said "We were fucking horrendous, but I think people liked us because they thought it was adorable, precocious or whatever. We were just playing wretched L7 covers and AC/DC covers and stuff like that. It was like the laziest of the lazy garage rock because at that point the entire mission was just to get onstage and play rock ‘n’ roll."[2]

The brothers' musical tastes would eventually change and evolve giving birth to The Gadjits. In 1995, The Gadjits recorded their first demo cassette and formed their label JoCo Ska Records. In 1996 the band, which were joined by keyboard player Heidi Blobaum, released their debut album, Da Gravy on Yo' Grits through their own label. The album, along with other local band's albums, was recorded in their mom's basement. The album gained the band local success which led to opening slots for bands including The Skatalites, Rancid and Let's Go Bowling.

In 1997, Rancid's Tim Armstrong signed the band to his label Hellcat Records making them the youngest band on the label with the average age of the band members being just 17. In early 1998, the band released their second album, At Ease and would appear on the Vans Warped Tour later that summer. Following the release of the album, Heidi Blobaum decided to leave the band to attend college and was replaced by Hillary Allen. The band's third album and second with Hellcat, Wish We Never Met, was released in 1999. The band parted ways with Hellcat Records in 2001.

In 2001 they released the Yes I Are EP for VMS Records and that same year, guitarist Mike Alexander joined the band and they signed with Thick Records where they released the single "Someday Driver" and in 2002 their fourth and final album (to be released), Today Is My Day. In 2003, the band was signed and then subsequently dropped by RCA Records while in the process of recording their fifth album Our Time To…. Nothing from the album has ever been released and it is unknown how much was completed. Brandon Philips said "the week we started recording was the same week that RCA and Jive Records merged, and Clive Davis took over RCA. They fired everybody, including our artists and repertoire guy and the president, who were the two dudes who signed us, and so once the people that sign you are fired, you’re pretty much dead."

In 2016, the band's debut album, Da Gravy on Yo' Grits, was remastered and released on vinyl by Teenage Heart Records to celebrate the 20th anniversary of its release. The album included an exclusive 7" record that contained two unreleased songs.

=== The Architects ===
Following the band being dropped from RCA, Philips said "we were tired of dragging around the baggage that comes with still being called The Gadjits after many years. So we just killed The Gadjits and became a new thing; that’s it." In June 2004, The Gadjits ceased to exist and the Philips brothers along with Gadjits guitarist Mike Alexander formed a new band, The Architects. As of 2017, the band has released six albums and two EPs.

=== The Sex Police ===
In 2006 the Phillips brothers formed The Sex Police.

=== Brandon Phillips and The Condition ===
In 2015, Brandon along with his two brothers and local Kansas City musicians began writing and recording music for his new pop-soul group, Brandon Phillips and The Condition. "There are these two periods in music other than punk rock that are really special to me. One of them is the soul and girl-group pop of the 60's and the other is this beautiful moment in the 80’s when all these new wave artists like Elvis Costello and The Pretenders were being openly worshipful of 60's soul and girl-group sounds." Phillips said of the influence on his new band. The band performed their first shows a year later and their debut digital single, "Heartsick/Clean and Sober" was released in 2017. The band's only physical release is the "People Talk" / "Angel Say No" 7" single released on Too Much Rock in April 12, 2019. The B-side is a cover of the 1980 Tommy Tutone hit.

== Discography ==
=== Albums ===
- Da Gravy On Yo Grits (JoCo Ska, 1996)
- At Ease (Hellcat Records, 1998)
- Wish We Never Met (Hellcat Records, 1999)
- Today Is My Day (Thick Records, 2002)
- Our Time To... (RCA Records, 2003) (recording was underway when the band was dropped from the label. Nothing from the album has ever been released and it is unknown how much of the album was completed)

=== Singles, EPs and split releases ===
- The Gadjits EP (JoCo Ska, 1995) (Demo cassette)
- Wish We Never Met (Hellcat Records, 1999) (promotional cassette)
- Yes I Are EP (VMS Records, 2001)
- Someday Driver (Thick Records, 2001)
- Wish We Never Found This (Teenage Heart Records, 2016) (two unreleased songs on 7" vinyl released with the 20th Anniversary remastered vinyl edition of Da Gravy On Yo' Grits)

=== Compilation appearances ===
- 'Gangster Girl' and 'Sassy' on the 'Skank For Brains - Saturday Matinee' compilation (Beach Records, 1996)
- 'Beautiful Girl' on the 'Give 'Em The Boot' compilation (Hellcat Records, 1997)
- 'Don't You Forget About Me' on the 'In Their Eyes: 90's Teen Bands Vs. 80's Teen Movies' compilation (Rhino Records 1998)
- 'Bad Gadjit' on the 'Give 'Em The Boot Vol. II' compilation (Hellcat Records, 1999)
- 'One Stones Throw (From A Riot)' on the 'Give 'Em The Boot Vol. III' compilation (Hellcat Records, 2002)
