= The Valley of the Shadow of Death =

Studio album by The Tossers
- Released: October 4, 2005
- Genre: Celtic Punk
- Length: 50:03
- Label: Victory Records
- Producer: Andy Gerber

The Tossers chronology
| Purgatory (2003) | The Valley of the Shadow of Death (2005) | Agony (2007) |

Professional ratings
Review scores
| Source | Rating |
|---|---|
| Allmusic | link |

The Valley of the Shadow of Death is Chicago Celtic Punk band The Tossers' fifth studio album. It was released in 2005 on Victory Records and is their first album with the label.

The title is from the Bible, Psalm 23:4 "Even though I walk through the valley of the shadow of death, I will fear no evil, for you are with me; your rod and your staff, they comfort me."

The eighth track, "Drinking In the Day", begins with a reading of the poem "Clearing a Space", by the Irish poet Brendan Kennelly.

== Track listing ==
1. "Goodmornin' Da" – 1:42
2. "A Criminal of Me" – 3:44
3. "No Loot, No Booze, No Fun" – 2:58
4. "The Crock of Gold" – 6:01
5. "Late" – 3:31
6. "Out on the Road" – 2:38
7. "I've Pursued Nothing" – 4:05
8. "Drinking in the Day" – 6:53
9. "Phoenix Park" – 4:07
10. "Go Down Witch Down" – 3:14
11. "Preab San Ol" – 4:28
12. "The Valley of the Shadow of Death" – 6:38
