= Steve Dixon (actor) =

British actor and academic

Stephen Robert Dixon (born 1956 in Manchester, England) is a British actor and academic.

== Early life ==
He studied performing arts at the Victoria University of Manchester, graduating in the same class as Rik Mayall. He worked as an actor for many years, taking minor roles in films like Privates on Parade and on television shows including The Young Ones and The Krypton Factor. For three years in the early 1980s he began working as a stand-up comic at The Comedy Store in London. He also worked in theatre, most notably with directors such as Nicholas Hytner, Steven Berkoff and Richard Eyre as well as working with experimental theatre companies Incubus and Lumiere & Son. He has directed productions himself in Mexico, Latvia and the UK, and produced an opera for the theatre company Opera North. Dixon has also directed five independent films which include large-scale movies produced through community texts. He also won an Industrial Society directing award for corporate video. He has also been the Director of Training for Glasgow Film and Video Workshop. Dixon has directed television programmes for Anglia and Granada Television, where he also produced an arts series. In 1984 Dixon appeared on Coronation Street as a taxi driver escorting the long serving character Elsie Tanner out of Weatherfield after 24 years on the show and 45 years on the street.

He turned to lecturing during the 1990s, and has since become a noted academic in the field of performing arts. Originally working at the University of Salford, he has since moved to Brunel University in London, where he was head of the School of Arts, and later from 2008 one of the university's Pro-Vice-Chancellors. One of his main publications is the book on Digital Performance published by MIT Press.

== Academic background ==
=== University of Salford ===
Steve Dixon is a noted academic in the field of performing arts, in the 1990s he started lecturing at the University of Salford. Between 1991 and 2005 he was the Associate Head (Teaching and Learning) of the School of Media, Music and Performance at the University of Salford. In 1992 he co-founded the first honours degree combining media and performance. And then in 1994 he created the first UK module for Stand-up comedy, one of the former students of the course being Peter Kay.

Dixon also created the theatre company 'The Chameleons Group' in 1994, in which he was the director. They aimed to explore new ways to create multimedia performances and produced four performances whilst Steve Dixon was at the University of Salford. The four performances 'The Chameleon Group' produced were: ‘Chameleons: The Dark Perversity’ in 1994, ‘Chameleons 2: theatre in a movie screen’ in 1999, ‘Chameleons3: Net Congestion’ in 2000 and ‘Chameleons 4: The Doors of Serenity’ in 2002. All of their performances where part of Steve Dixon's practice-as-research.

Between the Years 1999 and 2000 Dixon began working on, and became the co-director of the Digital Performance Archive. Whilst at the University of Salford he published several articles which address a range of subjects including performance studies, gender, virtual theatre, pedagogy and cybertheory in leading journals such as The Drama Review (TDR), CTHEORY and Digital Creativity. Dixon also published two CD-ROMs which document and analyse the work of his multimedia theatre company, The Chameleons Group. One in 1996 called 'Chameleons: theatrical experiments in style, genre and multi-media’ and another in 1999 called ‘Chameleons 2: theatre in a movie screen’. In 2004 Steve Dixon's co-authored book with Barry Smith ‘Digital Performance: New Technologies in Theatre, Dance and Performance Art’ was published by the MIT press.

=== University of Brunel ===
In 2005 Steve Dixon left the University of Salford to become the Head of the School of Arts at the University of Brunel. Dixon led strategic and curriculum developments in the School of Arts at Brunel that led to the establishment of four research centres and the development of 11 new Masters Courses as well as the creation of new subject areas such as, Journalism and Videogames Design. His work as the Head of School of Arts also led to the recruitment of world-leading Professors, such as Fay Weldon and Stelarc. Dixon also managed to start the development of the new £3M Performance and Media centre at the University of Brunel.

Dixon later became the Pro-Vice-Chancellor for development at the University of Brunel. As the Pro-Vice-Chancellor, Steve's portfolio included knowledge transfer and enterprise development, corporate relationship management, sponsorship and fundraising, PR and profile raising, special projects and international collaborations.

Steve Dixon's other achievements whilst at the University of Brunel included producing his 800-page book Digital Performance, which has won two international awards. Publishing more works on subjects including theatre studies, film theory, digital arts, Artificial Intelligence, and pedagogy. Co-founding and becoming Associate Editor of the International Journal of Performance Arts and Digital Media, he is also currently on the editorial board for the academic journals CTheory, Studies in Theatre and Performance, and Body, Space & Technology. Steve has also been invited many times to present seminars at many different Universities' including Paris Sorbonne, Trinity, Beijing Film Academy, Kansas, Bayreuth, Manchester, Nottingham and Bristol. Dixon has also delivered keynote conference addresses in the US, Australia, Korea and the UK.

=== Lasalle College of the Arts ===
Since February 2012, Dixon has been the president of Lasalle College of the Arts in Singapore.

=== Advisory Positions ===
Dixon is a Research Panel member for the Arts and Humanities Research Council (Panel 7, Music and Performing Arts), and has served on two specially constituted AHRC advisory panels (ICT in Creative and Performing Arts, and the Strategic Evaluation Review of AHDS). Dixon is a recognised academic pioneer and advisor on the use of ICT in the arts and humanities. He is currently a standing committee member of Digital Resources in Humanities and Arts (DRHA) and an advisory board member of the Arts and Humanities Data Service (AHDS), and Artifact (JISC Resource Discovery Network hub).

Previously he worked as a subject reviewer for the Quality Assurance Agency (QAA) and was a member of the Benchmarking Reference Group for Dance, Drama and Performance Studies. Dixon has also formerly been a Chair of the Information Technology Group for the drama subject association SCUDD, a committee member for Performance Studies International, a panel advisor to the North West Arts Board, and an expert advisor on the JISC Arts and Humanities Research ICT Awareness and Training project.

== Published works ==
=== The Digital Performance Archive ===
In 1999 Steve Dixon became a co-director for the newly developed Digital Performance Archive funded by the Arts and Humanities Research Council (UK). The Digital Performance Archive was established as a tool to document and analyse interdisciplinary developments in performance which draw upon varied forms of digital media. During the years 1999 – 2000 the Digital Performance Archive recorded all activity found in this field and became an extensive online database of individual works. The unique and intensive research documented over the two years are viewed as a significant historical period for digital performance. The study covers both digital resources used in performance and digital resources on performance in the period studied, examples of these include theatrical performances that incorporate electronic media to performance arts databases. The Digital Performance Archive project holds high value in a wide range of academic disciplines.

=== Digital Performance: New Technologies in Theatre, Dance and Performance Art ===
It was after this major research project that Steve Dixon co-authored (with Barry Smith) the book Digital Performance and accompanying DVD Digital Performance: New Technologies in Theatre, Dance and Performance Art which was published by MIT Press in 2004. The 800 pages of Digital Performance outline the theory and history of digital performance. The book analyses topics such as ‘space’ and ‘interactivity’ and pays particular attention to the extensive research project of the Digital Performance Archive between the years of 1999–2000. Subsequently, the book contains additional research from the 1980s, 1990s and work from the early 2000s. Along with providing a history of digital performance, Dixon addresses and critiques views regarding digital performance. Digital Performance has won two international awards – The Association of American Publishers Award for Excellence in Music and the Performing Arts (Professional/Scholarly Publishing Awards) and the Lewis Mumford Award for Outstanding Scholarship in the Ecology of Technics (Media Ecology Association).

His contributions to the Digital Performance Archive and the creation of his book Digital Performance have provided a solid grounding for the ongoing discussion of digital performance.

=== Published Journals ===
Steve Dixon published extensively on a broad range of areas including theatre studies, digital arts, film theory, Artificial Intelligence and pedagogy in lead journals such as TDR and CTheory. Dixon is Associate Editor of the International Journal of Performance Arts and Digital Media, a journal in which he co-founded.

== The Chameleons Group ==
The Chameleons group was a multimedia performance research Company directed by Steve Dixon. The company was founded by Steve Dixon and Paul Murphy, and performer Wendy Reed in 1994. It was established from within the Media and Performance Research Unit (Now the Music, Media, and Performing Arts Research Centre) at the University of Salford. The group consisted of Wendy Reed, Fiona Watson, Paul Murphy, Steve Dixon and Sara Bailes.

The aim of The Chameleons Group was to create multimedia performances. The company devised and toured with live 'film-theatre' productions, where live actors work in front of large video screens, interacting with film characters and their own 'digital doubles', and appear to move from the stage to the screen space. The company has also toured with many original theatre performances that experimented with the integration of video and live performance. In 2000, the group presented their most ambitious interactive cyber-theatre event ever staged, the performance allowed online audiences to direct the actors and write dialogue for the performances in real time.

The Chameleons group produced four performances, these were:

- Chameleons: The Dark Perversity of Chameleons
- Chameleons 2: Theatre in a movie screen
- Chameleons 3: Net Congestion
- Chameleons 4: The Doors of Serenity

As well as four performances Steve Dixon went on to create a two award-winning CD-ROMs which documented and analysed the creation and rehearsal process of the performances of ‘The Dark Perversity of Chameleons’ and ‘Theatre in a Movie Screen’. More recently Chameleons Group performers have collaborated with artists Paul Sermon, Andrea Zapp and Mathais Fuchs, on the telematic performance Unheimlich. Unheimlich was a telematic performance installation (funded by the Art Council) that was exhibited at conferences including SIGGRAPH which enabled the audience in the US to participate in an improvisation with live performers in the UK. The performance used Freud's notion of the uncanny, Unheimlich (at once familiar, homelike, but also strange, alien and uncomfortable) as its starting point.

=== Chameleons: The Dark Perversity of Chameleons ===
The Dark Perversity of Chameleons was the first performance created by The Chameleon Group and directed by Steve Dixon. The idea was conceived and developed by the media and performance research unit at the University of Salford. In the summer of 1994 it was performed at the University of Salford and toured various venues. It was a technically ambitious project that involved the devising of a theatrical text and the shooting and editing of over six hours of original video material. The end video material was screened on five video monitors positioned in different places on the set. The devising process incorporated a composer (Steven Durrant) who wrote and recorded original music for the production.

The aim of the project was to attempt to explore the usefulness of Antonin Artaud's theories of performance in specific relation to postmodern theatrical and televisual forms. The production originally attempted to interweave and juxtapose Antonin Artaud's theories of performance with Eastern concepts of ritual and performance codification within and against modern popularist performative models. However, three weeks into the devising process it was evident amongst the performers that it was very difficult to practically realise Antonin Artaud's theories of the actor. So after three weeks of experimenting with Artaudian acting styles, Antonin Artaud's theories were largely abandoned. However, some aspects of Artaud's theories remained such as the use of stylised physical gestures, which were employed as a physical language system.

The performance was centred on ‘Five people sitting alone in different bedrooms watching television sets. The televisions transmit different sequences, depicting each character’s thoughts and memories, mixed with their inner visions – dreams, secrets and hallucinations...’

The performance contained five characters, these characters were: Rachel (Sara Bailes), Derek (Steve Dixon), Mike (Paul Murphy), Veronica (Wendy Reed) and Sophia (Fiona Watson). Each of the characters applied the physical language system to themselves. This meant that each character had four physical gestures which were repeated throughout the piece. As the piece progressed the characters also took on each other's gestures.

=== Chameleons 2 – Theatre In A Movie Screen ===
The second research project Steve Dixon and the Chameleons Group created in 1999 was entitled Chameleons 2 – Theatre In A Movie Screen and contained four core performers from the Group, Paul Murphy, Wendy Reed, Julia Eaton and Steve Dixon.

The narrative portrayed four characters in an imagined place and time somewhere between reality and a dream, who were striving to find a sense of self and their role within the external world. The primary research objective of the Chameleons Group was to bring a closer integration of the video and of live action.

Chameleons 2 evolved over an eight-week devising process in which practical approaches and methodologies such as hot seating were undertaken in the development of the characters and the devising of the show. Three months previously to this process each of the four performers documented their dreams which enabled the company to have an initial springboard for the creation of ideas.

The performance space contained a projection screen enclosing hidden doors and windows which live action could take place – the notion of a theatre within a movie screen. The openings in the screen had numerous purposes such as a door that was used an entrance however a window represented a cliff top.

=== Chameleons 3 – Net Congestion ===
In 2000 Steve Dixon co-directed and performed two individual cybertheatre performances alongside his performance research company, The Chameleons Group. The performances were entitled ‘Chameleons 3 – Net Congestion’, which contained the core performers of the Chameleons Group, Paul Murphy, Wendy Reed and Steve Dixon himself. Over ten days the performers collaborated with eight guest artists to create edited film footage to be played on screens behind the live performers.

The performances took place on three separate stages situated in a black-box studio theatre. The live actors performed on the stages in front of projection screens which played the pre-recorded edited footage; however, there were no live audiences present.

Instead the performances were filmed with a three-camera Outside Broadcast unit that relayed the performance over the internet. Audiences online were given the opportunity to log into the live event and contribute to become the performance. The online audiences were invited to type in images, characters and dialogue, providing material for the performers to improvise with. Throughout the piece this opened a gateway for the performers to not only show pre-rehearsed material but also improvise entirely using the online interactive audience as a stimulus.

The topic of live and mediatised performance was dominant in this research project undertaken by the Chameleons Group as live Cybertheatre questions this issue. The Chameleons Group aimed to explore the theories of liveness, forming distinctions between the live and mediatised and questioning them through performance.

Chameleons 3 – Net Congestion produced a unique interactive cybertheatre performance in which the nature of the relationship held between the performers and audience transformed as the spectators became participants in the online interactive performance.

=== Chameleons 4 – The Doors of Serenity ===
In 2002 The Chameleons Group created Chameleons 4 – The Doors of Serenity, directed by Steve Dixon. Dixon also devised and performed the performance alongside Chameleons Group members Anna Fenemore, Wendy Reed and Barry Woods.

Four characters, a devil male escort, a genital-less femme fatale, a paranoid cyborg and a vampire bimbo played dangerous games through doors. Similarly to Chameleons 2, the performance incorporates multiple imaging and split screen digital video techniques with live theatre performed in hidden doors and windows within the screen itself. The Chameleons Group used this digital performance to explore the relationship between the esoteric and the populist; the disturbing and the comedic and the virtual and the 'real'. The multimedia theatre used aided the fusion of vivid dream narratives, surrealist comedy and the Artaudian techniques of the theatre of cruelty.
