= The GC5 =

- Origin: Lakewood, Ohio, U.S.
- Genres: Punk rock
- Years active: 1996–2003
- Label: Thick Records

The GC5 (Grady Coffee Five) was a punk rock band from Lakewood (Cleveland), Ohio, United States, formed in 1996 and split in 2003.

The GC5 provided a political charge to their music comparable to that of The Clash and Stiff Little Fingers. Lyrics included themes of social and political discontent, leftist politics, and the struggle of the working class. In 2000, The GC5 released their debut album Kisses From Hanoi, and in 2001, the band released the EP Horseshoes and Handgrenades. In 2002, the band released the album Never Bet the Devil Your Head. While most definitely presenting the sound of the streetpunk genre, the album was noted for not relying on the street fighting, hard-drinking themes that overruns many of the genre's songs. In 2003, Thick Records re-released their two albums Kisses From Hanoi (which was out of print) and Horseshoes and Handgrenades (which was originally only available as an import) on one CD. It was the final release from the band. After splitting up Doug and Dave formed Motel Blonde together with Ryan Foltz, who just left the Dropkick Murphys. Motel Blonde did not last long and broke up in March 2004. McKean then joined Rosavelt on the bass guitar, and formed Doug McKean & The Stuntmen a year later. Dave is now playing with The Magpies.

== Band members ==
- Doug McKean - bass and vocals
- Dave McKean - drums
- Pete Kyrou - guitar and vocals
- Chris Yohn - guitar and vocals
- Paul Weaver - guitar (replaced Yohn, post-Kisses From Hanoi)

== Discography ==
- Johnny Switchblade Adventure Punk (1997 cassette) - Guttersnipe Records
- A More Aggressive Approach Towards Peacekeeping (1997 CD) - Guttersnipe Records
- "Buy American" (1998 7") - Transparent Records
- "Takin' It to the Streets" (1999 7") - Transparent Records
- "The Price of Security" (1999 7") - Transparent Records
- Kisses From Hanoi (2000 CD) - Outsider Records
- Horseshoes and Handgrenades (2001 CD-EP/7") - Leprock Records
- 67,104 Miles Later (2001 Split CD-EP w/ Hudson Falcons) - Cosa Nostra Records
- Singles Collection (1997–2000) (2001 CD) - Cosa Nostra Records
- Never Bet the Devil Your Head (2002 CD/LP) - Thick Records
- Kisses From Hanoi/Horseshoes and Handgrenades (2003 CD re-release) - Thick Records
