= CTheory =

- Discipline: Cultural
- Language: English
- Edited by: Arthur Kroker and Marilouise Kroker

Publication details
- Former names: Canadian Journal of Political and Social Theory
- History: 1976–2017
- Open access: Yes

Standard abbreviations
- ISO 4: CTheory

Indexing
- ISSN: 1190-9153 (print); 0380-9420 (web)

Links
- Journal homepage

CTheory was a peer-reviewed academic journal published from 1993 to 2017, known for being one of the first online-only academic journals and for publishing leading thinkers and "digirati" on questions of technology, theory, and the posthuman. It was the successor to the Canadian Journal of Political and Social Theory, which had been published from 1976 to 1991 in traditional print media. CTheory focused on technology, media theory, and culture, publishing articles, interviews, book reviews and "event-scenes."

It was edited by Arthur and Marilouise Kroker, along with notable figures of postmodern theory and early internet culture including Jean Baudrillard, Paul Virilio, Bruce Sterling, Shannon Bell, DJ Spooky, Eugene Thacker, RU Sirius, and Kathy Acker. Sterling periodically provided CTheory excerpts and recaps in Wired Magazine.

The journal was published by the University of Victoria (UVic), BC, Canada. It is now archived in the UVic library virtual space. A companion site, CTheory Multimedia, was published by Cornell University Library as an "international journal of web-based interactive art grouped around a common conceptual theme".
