= Columbus Monthly =

American monthly magazine

- Categories: City magazine
- Frequency: Monthly
- First issue: June 1975; 51 years ago
- Company: Gannett
- Country: United States
- Based in: Columbus, Ohio, U.S.
- Language: English
- Website: www.columbusmonthly.com
- ISSN: 2333-4150

Columbus Monthly is a magazine that has been an important and influential voice in Central Ohio. The magazine which was created in June 1975 has a well-earned reputation for tweaking the local establishment, challenging the monopoly daily on breaking news and providing a much-needed perspective and alternative voice on political and civic issues. It is also known for its heavily researched service pieces, such as Best of Columbus, and extensive restaurant coverage. It is a member of the City and Regional Magazine Association (CRMA).

Columbus Monthly also produces special sections and other publications covering a wide range of subjects: Homes, Restaurant Guide, Summer Entertainment Guide, Best Driving Vacations, Menu Guide, Home Building, Suburban Sections, Columbus Bride, CityGuide, Columbus Guests and Guide to Remodeling.

The magazine was owned by American Community Newspapers II, LLC., which also publishes The Other Paper, Columbus's news and entertainment weekly; Suburban News Publications, a group of 22 community newspapers; and Columbus C.E.O., a monthly business magazine. American Community Newspapers sold its Columbus properties to Dispatch Printing Company, owner of The Columbus Dispatch, in 2011. Dispatch Printing Company sold its Columbus print properties to GateHouse Media in June 2015. GateHouse acquired Gannett in 2019 and took the better-known Gannett name.
