= Screaming Urge =

US punk rock band

- Origin: Columbus, Ohio
- Genres: Punk rock
- Years active: 1978–1996
- Past members: Michael Ravage; Myke Rock; Dave Manic

Screaming Urge is an American, mid-west punk rock band founded in 1978 by guitarist Michael Ravage in Columbus, Ohio. The band toured the U.S. and Canada several times and released a 45 Homework b/w Runaway in 1979 and self-titled (or untitled) LPs in 1980 and 1981, commonly referred to as the Black & White and Blue albums, all on vinyl. Screaming Urge songs have been included in many D.I.Y. punk compilations through the years, including Killed By Death No. 6: Greatest Punk Shits and at least a couple Hyped 2 Death volumes. The Homework 45 and to a lesser extent, both LPs have become vinyl collector's items selling from as much as $50 to over $100 each, in their original releases. The 45 was reissued by Sing Sing Records (New York, United States) in January 2012 and both albums are scheduled for reissue in October 2012 by Rave Up Records (Rome, Italy), all with worldwide (physical) distribution. Screaming Urge also released a remastered CD, Gory Years, of all 25 songs found on the single and both albums in July 2011. Though the band does not consider itself "active" they continue to play reunion shows.

One of the first punk bands in central Ohio, Michael Ravage produced and invented the series of independent multiple-band music festivals called "Nowhere" (Nowhere '78, Nowhere '79, etc.) that continued into the late 90s. Screaming Urge made their debut at the Nowhere '78 show along with Battery, The Kinectics, and Vorpal Gallery. The Nowhere shows lasted from 1978 to 1996 showcasing an estimated 70 to 80 bands, even though the band did not actively exist much of that time.

== Personnel ==
- Michael Ravage — Guitar
- Myke Rock — Bass
- Dave Manic — Drums
