= The Other Paper =

Alternative weekly newspaper in Columbus, Ohio

- Type: Alternative weekly
- Founded: 1990
- Ceased publication: January 31, 2013
- Language: English
- Headquarters: Columbus, Ohio
- Website: theotherpaper.com

The Other Paper was an alternative weekly news publication that served the Greater Columbus, Ohio area from 1990 to 2013.

It was distributed on Thursdays and was known for local news and features such as concert and movie reviews, classified ads, and personals, all with a distinctly irreverent, humorous style. It had the second-largest newspaper distribution in Columbus behind The Columbus Dispatch.

The Other Paper, which since 1990 had been published by Columbus-based CM Media, was bought by Dallas-based American Community Newspapers in 2007, along with its sister publications Columbus Monthly, Columbus CEO and the 22 weekly newspapers printed by Suburban News Publications. American Community Newspapers sold its Columbus properties to Dispatch Printing Company in 2011.

On January 7, 2013, the Dispatch Co. announced it would shut down The Other Paper at the end of the month, citing duplication of Columbus Alive, the alternative weekly purchased by the Dispatch in 2006. The last edition of The Other Paper was published January 31, 2013.
