= Arthur Kroker =

Canadian academic (born 1945)

- Born: 1945 (age 80–81); Red Rock, Ontario, Canada
- Occupations: Author; editor; educator; researcher
- Spouse: Marilouise Kroker (m. 1971; died 2018)

Academic background
- Education: McMaster University (PhD)

Academic work
- Institutions: University of Victoria

Arthur Kroker (born 1945) is a Canadian author, editor, educator and researcher of political science, technology and culture.

== Life and career ==
He earned a PhD in political science from McMaster University in 1975. In addition to being a professor of political science at the University of Victoria, Kroker serves as director of the Pacific Centre for Technology and Culture (PACTAC), located at the university. Kroker was appointed to the Canada Research Chair in technology, culture and theory in 2003. He was the editor for the online academic journal CTheory, an international journal of theory, technology and culture.

Kroker has been an outspoken critic of the transformation of the early internet into a consumer-driven system ("virtual class"). Austrian magazine Monochrom interviewed him about his political motivations in 1996.

He was married to Marilouise Kroker from 1971 until her death in 2018.

== Bibliography ==
=== Books ===
- Technology and the Canadian Mind: Innis, McLuhan, Grant (1984)
- The Postmodern Scene: Excremental Culture and Hyper-Aesthetics (1987) (with David Cook)
- Panic Encyclopedia: The Definitive Guide to the Postmodern Scene (1989) (with David Cook and Marilouise Kroker)
- The Possessed Individual: Technology and the French Postmodern (1992)
- SPASM: Virtual Reality, Android Music, and Electric Flesh (1993)
- Data Trash: Theory of the Virtual Class (1994) (with Michael A. Weinstein)
- Hacking the Future (1996) (with Marilouise Kroker)
- The Will to Technology and the Culture of Nihilism: Heidegger, Nietzsche and Marx (2004)
- Body Drift: Butler, Hayles, Haraway (2012)
- Exits to the Posthuman Future (2014)
- Technologies of the New Real: Viral Contagion and Death of the Social (2021) (with Marilouise Kroker)
- The Quantum Revolution: Art, Technology, Culture (2023) (with David Cook)

=== As editor ===
- Body Invaders: Panic Sex in America (1987) (with Marilouise Kroker)
- The Hysterical Male: New Feminist Theory (1991) (with Marilouise Kroker)
- The Last Sex: Feminism and Outlaw Bodies (1993) (with Marilouise Kroker)
- Digital Delirium (1997) (with Marilouise Kroker)
- Life in the Wires: The CTheory Reader (2004) (with Marilouise Kroker)
- Critical Digital Studies: A Reader (2008) (with Marilouise Kroker)
