= The Tossers =

American band

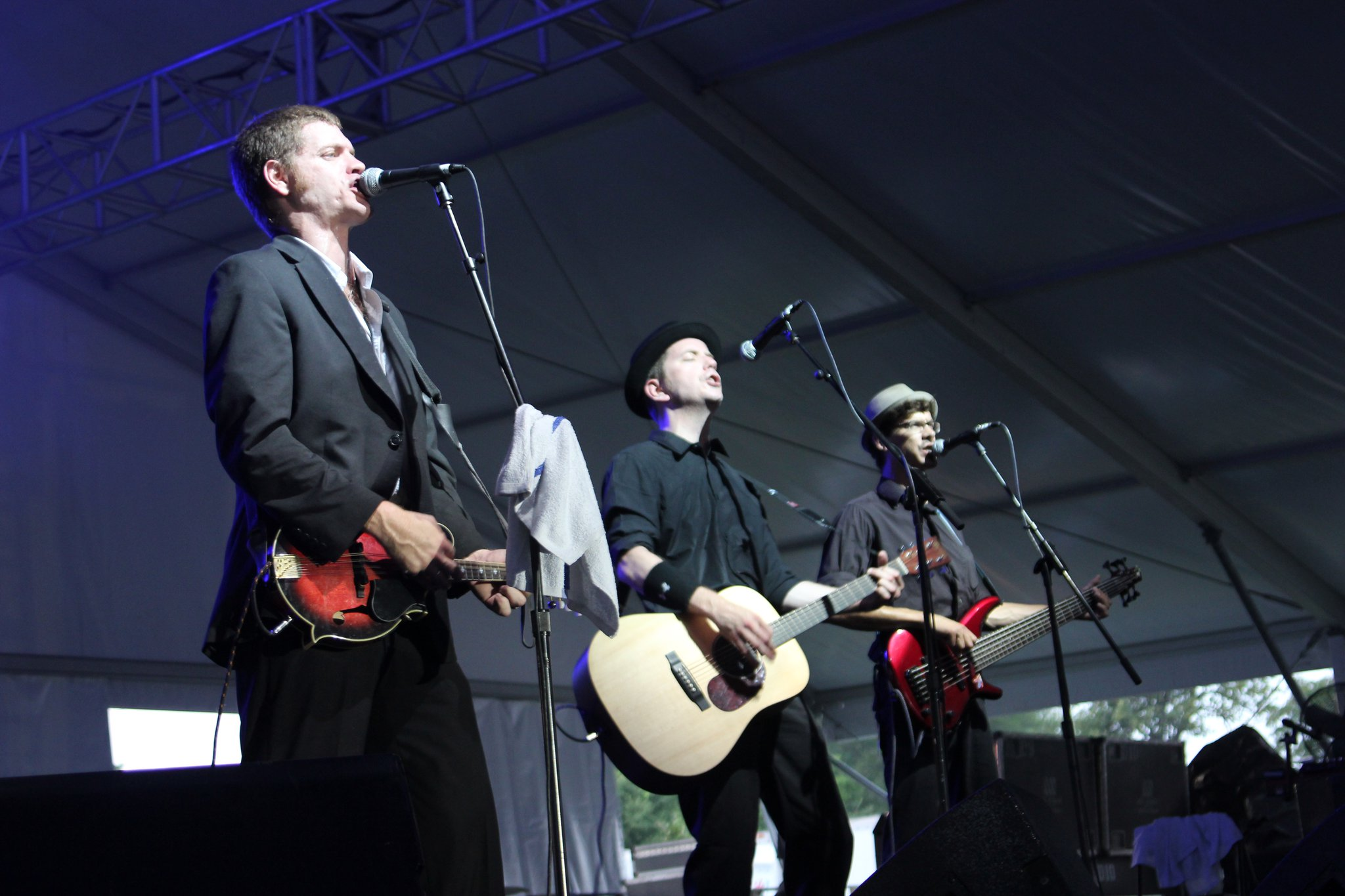
- The Tossers live

Background information
- Origin: Chicago, Illinois, U.S.
- Genres: Celtic punk, folk punk
- Years active: 1993–present
- Labels: Victory Records; Thick Records
- Members: T. Duggins; Peter Muschong; Emily Constantinou; Aaron Duggins; Mike Pawula; Fred Frey
- Past members: Bones; Clay Hansen; Jason Loveall; Brian Dwyer; Lynn Bower; Nate Van Allen; Dan Shaw; Rebecca Manthe

The Tossers are an American six-piece Celtic punk band from Chicago, Illinois, United States, formed in July 1993. They have toured with Murphy's Law, Streetlight Manifesto, Catch 22, Dropkick Murphys, The Reverend Horton Heat, Flogging Molly, Street Dogs, Clutch, Sick of it All and Mastodon. They opened for The Pogues in New York City on St. Patrick's Day in 2007. The Tossers were honored to play the Kennedy Center in May 2016.

The band pre-dates more well-known Celtic punk bands such as the Dropkick Murphys and Flogging Molly, which formed in 1996 and 1997, respectively. Their latest album, entitled Smash the Windows, was released on March 3, 2017.

== Band members ==
Current

- T. Duggins – vocals and mandolin
- Aaron Duggins – tin whistle
- Mike Pawula – guitar
- Fred Frey – drums
- Peter Muschong – bass
- Emily Ruth Constantinou – violin

Former

- Bones – drums
- Rebecca Manthe – fiddle
- Brian Dwyer – guitar
- Clay Hansen – banjo
- Lynn Bower – vocals
- Jason Loveall – fiddle
- Nate Van Allen – guitar
- Dan Shaw – bass
- Scott Lucas – bass (touring)

== Discography ==
=== Albums and singles ===
- The Pint of No Return (1994)
- We'll Never Be Sober Again (1996) Folk You Records
- The Tossers/The Arrivals (split single) (1998) Smilin Bob Records
- Long Dim Road (2000) Thick Records
- Citizen Fish/The Tossers (split single) (2001) Thick Records
- The First League Out from Land (EP) (2001) Thick Records
- Communication & Conviction: Last Seven Years (2001) Thick Records
- Purgatory (2003) Thick Records
- Live at The Metro 18 November 2004 (eMusic digital album) (2004) The Metro/eMusicLive
- The Valley of the Shadow of Death (2005) Victory Records
- Agony (2007) Victory Records
- Gloatin' and Showboatin': Live on St. Patrick's Day (CD/DVD) (2008) Victory Records
- On a Fine Spring Evening (2008) Victory Records
- The Emerald City (2013) Victory Records
- Smash the Windows (2017)
- The Tossers (30th Anniversary) (2023)

=== Compilations ===
- Eat Your Corn: The 2nd DeKalb Compilation (1995) with "Buckets of Beer" and "When You Get Here"
- Magnetic Curses: A Chicago Punk Rock Compilation (2000) with "The Crutch (Alternate Version)"
- Love & Rebellion: A Thick Records Sampler (2002) with "The Pub (Alternate Version)" and "Dancing Shoes"
- OIL: Chicago Punk Refined (2003) with "Teehan's"

=== T. Duggins solo discography ===
- Undone (2006)
- Mean It Man: A Thick Records Document (2005) with "Larkin" & "Irish Rover"
