= Griffin Layne =

American singer-songwriter

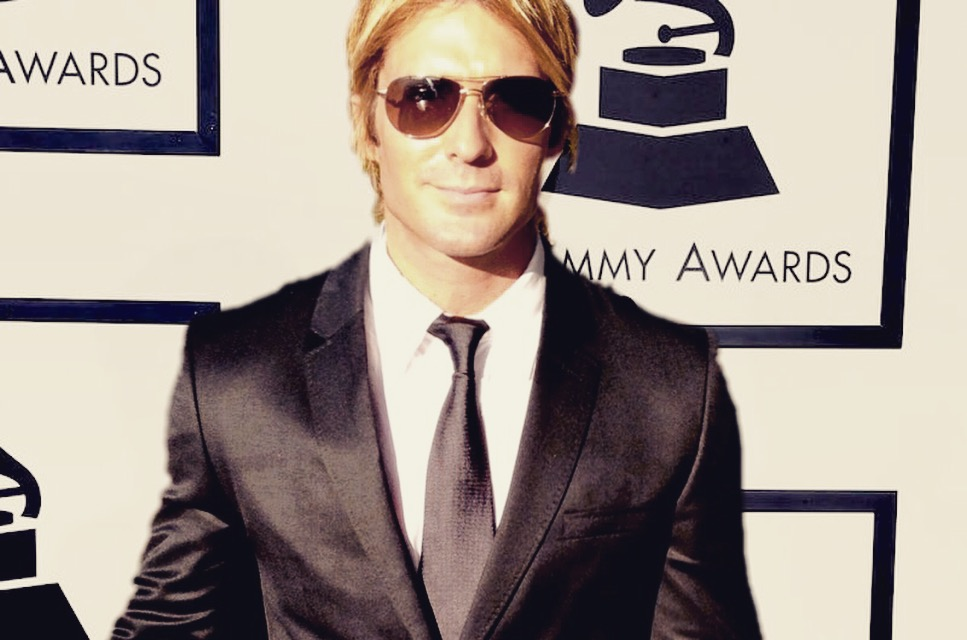
- Griffin Layne at the 55th Annual Grammy Awards- Staples Center (Los Angeles, CA)

Background information
- Birth name: Griffin Layne
- Born: Kettering, Ohio
- Origin: Nashville, Tennessee
- Genres: Country
- Occupation(s): Singer-songwriter, producer
- Instrument(s): Vocals, guitar
- Years active: 2007–present
- Labels: UMG; Equus Records
- Website: www.equusrecords.com

Griffin Layne is an American country music singer and songwriter.

Layne's debut single,"Nothin like a Southern Girl", has been added to the Most Popular Urban Cowboy Music Tracks Chart, by 93.5 FM. Layne co-wrote and produced his debut single, "Nothin like a Southern Girl", which was released on January 23, 2016 on Equus Records.

Griffin won four awards for his work, including Artist of the Year at the Los Angeles Music Awards in 2007, Producers Choice Award at the Los Angeles Music Awards in 2008, Best Country Artist and Best Country Song at the IMC Awards in 2015.

Griffin has cited some of his musical influencers, such as Dave Grohl.
