= Sullen (band) =

American band active from 1999 to 2004

- Origin: St. Louis, Missouri
- Genres: Rock
- Years active: 1999–2004
- Label: Thick Records
- Past members: Justin Slazinik, Shanna Kiel, Scott Freeman, Bryan Weitekemper, Matt Basler, Adam Gillespie, Tommy Schmitz

Sullen was a rock band from St. Louis, Missouri, formed by Justin Slazinik (guitar/vocals) and Shanna Kiel (guitar/vocals).

== History ==
Slazinik and Kiel met in high school and started playing live shows together in 1999.

In the summer of 1999, Sullen independently released the demo Five Songs for Billy Brown. On November 12, 1999, Sullen opened for the Chicago-based rock duo Local H at The Karma in downtown St. Louis. The two bands formed a working relationship, and shortly thereafter, Local H frontman Scott Lucas invited Kiel to contribute vocals to the song “5th Ave. Crazy” from their album Here Comes the Zoo.

Sullen then embarked on a national tour with Local H in the spring of 2000. (The lineup consisted of Kiel, Slazinik, with drummer Bryan Weitekemper and bassist Scott Freeman). Following the tour, Weitekemper left the band, and Freeman took over as Sullen's drummer.

Sullen recorded a second demo consisting of 10 songs. This caught the attention of Wes Kidd, frontman of Chicago's Triple Fast Action. Working with Silent Partner Management, Kidd became Sullen's manager.

In May 2003, Sullen released their debut album Paint the Moon on Thick Records. The album featured Tommy Schmitz on drums/bass and Adam Gillespie on bass.

Kiel announced Sullen's breakup several days prior to a show at St. Louis’ Creepy Crawl on February 27, 2004.

In 2006, Kiel posted on stlpunk.com that Sullen had gotten back together. However, the reunion did not last.

On April 1, 2017, Sullen (Slazinik, Kiel, and Freeman) played a reunion show at Delmar Hall.

Following Sullen's breakup, both Slazinik and Kiel continued writing and performing:

On November 7, 2006, Kiel released her full-length, solo debut, Orphan, on Thick Records. Kiel and a friend, Stephanie Sandman, performed as Sibylline for a period of time. In 2005, the pair moved to Los Angeles and later regrouped as Black Fur. Black Fur embarked on a short tour of California with The Hold Steady.

Slazinik fronted Short and Sweet with guitarist Zach LaRose, drummer Ryan Harding, and bassist Phil Blythe. Short and Sweet toured with Local H in 2005.

In 2008, Slazinik and Harding moved to Chicago and founded Left Brain Heart. Slazinik and Harding recorded what would be released as the band's first album, Sweetie Pie the Tornado (2005) prior to founding the band. Their second record, Hunter/Gatherer, was recorded in 2009 at Million Yen Studios (where Sullen recorded Paint the Moon). In summer 2010, Left Brain Heart joined Local H for a three-week west coast tour. Left Brain Heart disbanded in 2010.

In 2021, Justin Slazinik, with Zack LaRose (Short and Sweet) and former Sullen bandmates Adam Gillespie and Bryan Weitekemper, formed the band Slazinik. Their first album was recorded in spring 2022 at Encapsulated Studios, and will be released in April 2023.

== Critical reception ==
Johnny Loftus, writing for Allmusic, gave Paint the Moon 2.5 out of 5 stars, writing that "While Sullen has rage to spare and has mastered the quiet/loud, female/male dynamic, the band's influences bleed through the fabric on most tracks [on the album]." Writing for Exclaim!, Shawn Merrill called Sullen "the demon child of Sonic Youth" and described Paint the Moon as "Not a quintessential release, but an engaging one." A reviewer named Megan, writing for Punknews.org, gave the album 5 out of 5 stars. In her review, Megan said that Sullen "absolutely blows any competition out of the water" on the album and praised it for being "rough around the edges".

== Discography ==
- Paint the Moon (Thick Records, 2003)
