= Thick Records =

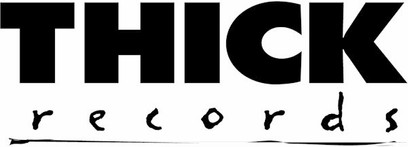
- Founded: 1994; 32 years ago
- Founder: Zak Einstein
- Status: Active
- Genre: Punk, ska-punk
- Country of origin: United States
- Location: Chicago, Los Angeles
- Official website: thickrecords.com

Thick Records is a Chicago-based independent record label which actively operated from 1994 to 2007. It now exists as a catalog only label for its previous releases.

== History ==
Thick was formed in 1994 by Detroit native Zak Einstein, who started the label when he re-located to Chicago after graduating from Michigan State University. Early releases include albums from Chicago ska-punkers The Blue Meanies, Alton, IL's Judge Nothing, Seattle's grunge rockers Truly featuring Robert Roth, Mark Pikerel, and Soundgarden's Hiro Yamamoto, and the Omaha-based Commander Venus, whose members included Conor Oberst, Tim Kasher, Matt Bowen and Todd Baechle. Blue Meanies singer Billy Spunke joined Einstein and signed multiple Chicago punk rock artists including The Tossers, The Arrivals, and The Methadones. The label also issued the Trenchmouth compilation 'More Motion' spanning the years 1987–1997 in 2003.

Thick released picture disc vinyl including 7" records from Alkaline Trio, At The Drive-in, ALL, and Citizen Fish. The label also released several compilations documenting Chicago rock and punk music. The compilations included 2000's Magnetic Curses: A Chicago Punk Rock Compilation, which included music from Gaza Strippers, Alkaline Trio, and Pegboy. In 2002, the label issued Love & Rebellion, a compilation of label acts including Trenchmouth, The Tossers, and Commander Venus. Oil: Chicago Punk Refined, a 2003 release from the label, included tracks from nineteen Chicago-area punk acts, including Rise Against, The Lawrence Arms, The Tossers, Plain White T's, Bob Nanna, and Local H. The tracks for the Oil compilation were recorded in an oil blending factory.

The label hosted a summer barbecue/independent music event for several years, The Annual Chicago Rock Yards & Flea Market.

In 2004 the label released a DVD collection of the "Out of Focus" fanzine, featuring acts including Green Day, Jawbreaker, Voodoo Glow Skulls, Down By Law, Sludgeworth, Born Against, Los Crudos and more.

In 2004 Einstein moved the label to Los Angeles. The last label releases came in 2007 with CDs from The Brokedowns and Seven Storey Mountain. Thick was distributed by the Symbiotic Label Group from 1994 to 1999, Southern Records 1999–2004, the Lumberjack Mordam Music Group 2005–2007, Nail Allegro Distribution and The Orchard 2007–present. As of 2021, Thick operates as a catalog-only label.

== Bands ==
- The Arrivals
- Bitchy
- Blue Meanies
- The Bomb
- The Brokedowns
- Calliope
- Commander Venus
- Cougars
- Tom Daily
- Fingers Cut Megamachine
- Five Deadly Venoms
- The Gadjits
- Gasoline Fight
- The GC5
- The Good Mornings
- Goldblade
- Geezer Lake
- Hanalei
- Haymarket Riot
- Horace Pinker
- Judge Nothing
- Lasalle
- Local H
- The Methadones
- Model/Actress
- New Black
- Orange
- Resident Genius/Howard Zinn
- Season to Risk
- Seven Storey Mountain
- Shanna Kiel & Black Fur
- Sullen
- T. Duggins
- The Tossers
- Trenchmouth
- Truly
- Vorits

== Other bands with Thick Records releases ==
- Alkaline Trio
- All
- At the Drive-In
- Back Of Dave
- Burning Airlines
- Citizen Fish
- Cows
- Dick Justice
- Edsel
- Liquor Bike
- Not Rebecca
- Servotron
- Speed Duster
- Starball
