= Haymarket Riot (band) =

Chicago-based post-punk/rock band

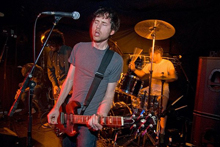
- Haymarket Riot performs live at Kapu in Linz, Austria on October 25, 2009

Background information
- Origin: Chicago, Illinois, U.S.
- Genres: Post-punk; punk rock; indie rock; post-hardcore
- Years active: 1999-present
- Labels: Divot Records; Thick Records; Stiff Slack Records
- Members: Kevin J. Frank; Fred Popolo; Brian Wnukowski
- Past members: Mike Bennett; Billy Smith; Chris Almodovar; Shane Hochstetler; Quinn Goodwillie; Michael Graff; Chris Daly
- Website: haymarketriotband.com

Haymarket Riot is a Chicago-based post-punk/rock band that was formed in 1999 by Mike Bennett, Kevin J. Frank, Fred Popolo and Billy Smith. The current line-up consists of Kevin J. Frank, Fred Popolo and Brian Wnukowski. Since 1999, Haymarket Riot has toured North America, Europe and Japan. Along the way, Haymarket Riot earned comparions to such popular underground bands as the Jesus Lizard, Fugazi, Jawbox, Samiam, and Cap'n Jazz.

== History ==
After releasing two EPs through Frank and Popolo's own Divot Records, the band were approached by Chicago independent record label Thick Records. Due to Thick Records' full-time staff and superior distribution, Haymarket Riot opted to sign with the label.

In 2001, the band released their debut full-length Bloodshot Eyes. Their follow up, 2004's Mog, was recorded with Steve Albini and John Congleton.

On April 7, 2009, Haymarket Riot released its third full-length album titled Endless Bummer on CD and as a digital download. The LP edition was later released on September 29, 2009, with alternate artwork and a download card which contains 2 bonus tracks. Early sessions for Endless Bummer were recorded with Albini at Electrical Audio in Chicago, IL March 8–9, 2008. Overdubs were done from April 7, 2008 - May 27, 2008, at Studio Greg Studios II in Chicago, IL by Greg Norman. Mixing was done November 22–23, 2008, and December 15, 2008, by Greg Norman at Electrical Audio. Mastering was done January 28 - February 8, 2009, by Carl Saff at Saff Mastering in Chicago, IL. The CD version was a limited pressing with hand silk screened covers.

Haymarket Riot features or has featured ex-members of Gauge, Traluma, Radio Flyer, Big'N, Sweep The Leg Johnny, Six Of One Half Summers, Just A Fire, Neutrino, Orwell, Hubcap, The Sky Corvair, Dempsey, and the Traitors. Brian Wnukowski also is the current drummer for Cougars. Kevin J. Frank is also the current drummer for Milwaukee's Chariots Race.

== Members ==
- Kevin J. Frank - vocals, guitar
- Fred Popolo - bass, vocals
- Brian Wnukowski - drums (2004–present)
- Mike Bennett - guitar (1999-2002)
- Billy Smith - drums (1999-2002)
- Chris Almodovar - guitar (2002)
- Shane Hochstetler - drums (2002-2004)
- Quinn Goodwillie - guitar (2002-2003)
- Michael Graff - guitar (2003)
- Chris Daly - guitar (2003-2011)

== Discography ==
=== Albums ===
- Bloodshot Eyes (Thick Records/Divot Records, 2001/Delboy Records, 2003)
- Mog (Thick Records/Divot Records, 2004)
- Endless Bummer (Divot Records, 2009)

=== EPs ===
- Self-Titled (Divot Records, 1999)
- Wax! (Divot Records, 2000)
- I Know What You Did (Stiff Slack Records 2006)

=== Singles ===
- Split with Her Fly Away Manner (Caulfield Records, 2001)
- Split with Hitch (What Else? Records, 2002)
- Split with Sweep The Leg Johnny (Makoto Records, 2002)
- If I Were A Transformer, My Name Would Be Bad Habit (2008)
- Recognize and Recall (2014)

=== Compilations ===
- This CD Contains The Self-Titled And Wax EPs (Divot Records, 2002)
