= The Afghan Whigs discography =

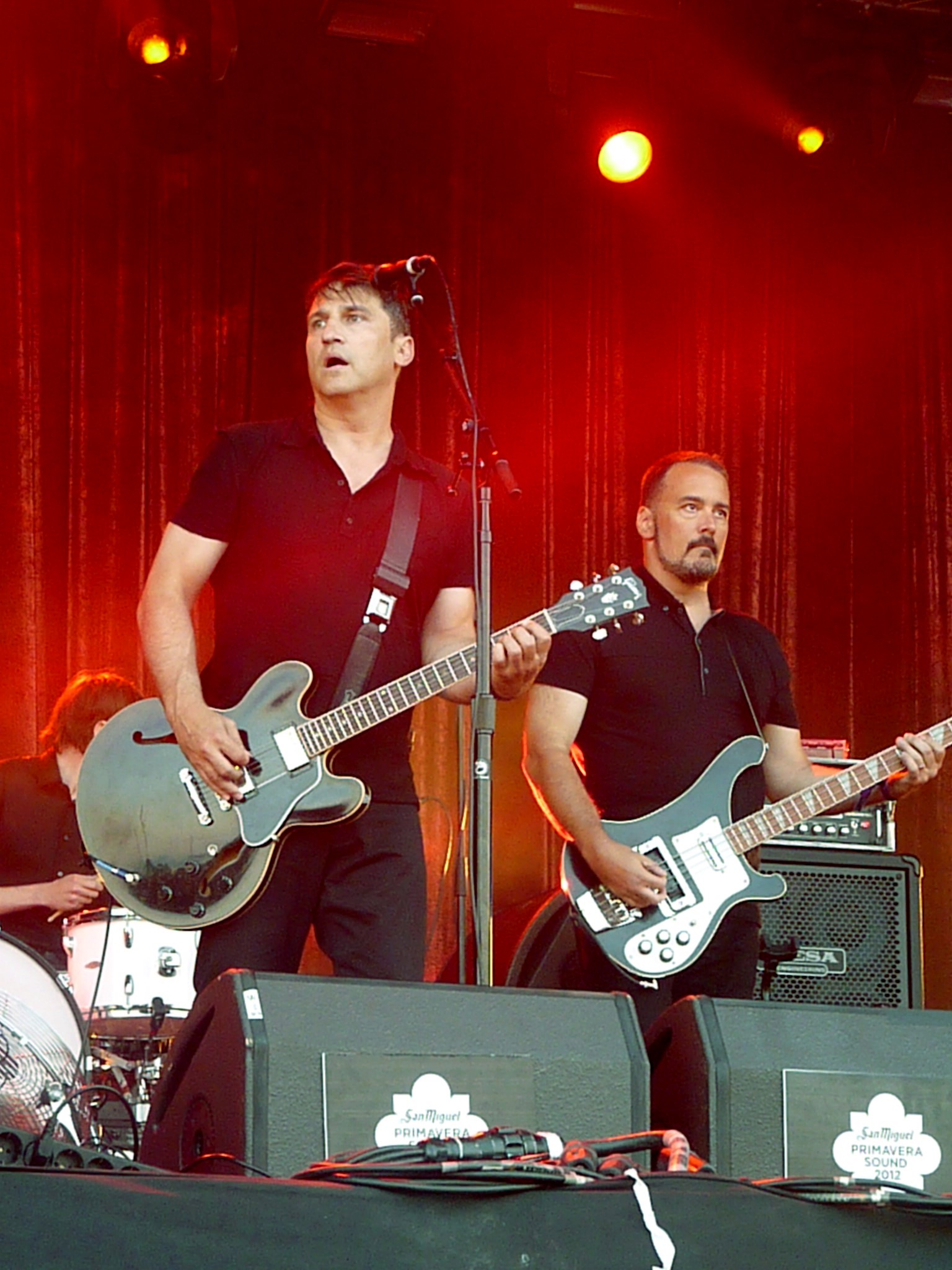
- The Afghan Whigs playing a live concert.
- Studio albums: 10
- Extended plays: 5
- Compilation albums: 2
- Singles: 14
- Music videos: 12

This is the discography for the Afghan Whigs.

== Albums ==
=== Studio albums ===
Year	Title	Peak chart position						
Year	Title	US	US Heat.	BEL (FL)	BEL (WA)	NZ	SWE	UK
1988	Big Top Halloween: Released: January 6, 1988; Label: Ultrasuede; Format: CD, CS, LP	—	—	—	—	—	—	—
1990	Up in It: Released: April, 1990; Label: Sub Pop; Format: CD, CS, LP	—	—	—	—	—	—	—
1992	Congregation: Released: January 31, 1992; Label: Sub Pop; Format: CD, CS, LP	—	—	—	—	—	—	—
1993	Gentlemen: Released: October 5, 1993; Label: Elektra; Format: CD, CS, LP	—	13	—	—	50	—	58
1996	Black Love: Released: March 12, 1996; Label: Elektra; Format: CD, CS, LP	79	—	23	37	35	38	41
1998	1965: Released: October 27, 1998; Label: Columbia; Format: CD, CS, LP	176	—	38	—	—	—	90
2014	Do to the Beast: Released: April 14, 2014; Label: Sub Pop; Format: CD, Double LP	32	—	5	41	—	—	40
2017	In Spades: Released: May 5, 2017; Label: Sub Pop; Formats: CD, LP	108	—	10	58	—	—	55
2022	How Do You Burn?: Released: September 9, 2022; Label: Royal Cream/BMG; Formats: CD, LP, digital download, streaming	—	—	8	107	—	—	—
2026	Soft Control: Released: August 21, 2026; Label: Royal Cream/BMG; Formats: CD, LP, digital download, streaming	—	—	30	21	—	—	—
"—" denotes releases that did not chart.

=== Compilation albums ===
Year	Title
1998	Historectomy: Released: September, 1998; Label: Columbia; Format: CD, LP
2007	Unbreakable: A Retrospective 1990–2006: Released: June 5, 2007; Label: Rhino; Format: CD, LP

== Extended plays ==
Year	Title
1992	Uptown Avondale: Released: June 11, 1992; Label: Sub Pop; Format: CD
1994	What Jail Is Like EP: Released: August 2, 1994; Label: Elektra; Format: CD
1994	The B-Sides/The Conversation: Released: 1994; Label: Elektra; Format: CD
1996	Bonnie & Clyde EP: Released: June 24, 1996; Label: Elektra; Format: CD
1998	Live at Howlin' Wolf: Released: 1998; Label: Columbia; Format: CD

== Singles ==
Year	Title	Peak chart positions		Album
Year	Title	US Mod.	UK	Album
"I Am the Sticks" / "White Trash Party"	1989	—	—	Non-album singles
"Sister Brother"	1990	—	—	Non-album singles
"Retarded"	1990	—	—	Up in It
"My World Is Empty Without You"	1990	—	—	Non-album singles
"Ornament" - Tonight (early version), Will You Still Love Me Tomorrow? (cover)	1991	—	—	Non-album singles
"Turn on the Water"	1992	—	—	Congregation
"Conjure Me"	1992	—	—	Congregation
"Mr. Superlove" (cover)	1993	—	—	Non-album single
"Gentlemen"	1993	—	—	Gentlemen
"Debonair"	1994	18	81	Gentlemen
"What Jail Is Like"	1994	—	—	Gentlemen
"Honky's Ladder"	1996	29	109	Black Love
"Going to Town"	1996	—	—	Black Love
"Somethin' Hot"	1998	—	—	1965
"66"	1999	—	—	1965
"See and Don't See" (cover)	2012	—	—	Non-album singles
"Lovecrimes" (cover)	2012	—	—	Non-album singles
"Algiers"	2014	—	—	Do to the Beast
"Matamoros"	2014	—	—	Do to the Beast
"Demon in Profile"	2017	—	—	In Spades
"Oriole"	2017	—	—	In Spades
"I'll Make You See God"	2022	—	—	How Do You Burn?
"The Getaway"	2022	—	—	How Do You Burn?
"—" denotes releases that did not chart.

== Compilation appearances ==
Year	Compilation	Tracks
1989	Where the Hell Are the Good Scissors?	"King of Millville"
1993	Five Alive Take 2 (Melody Maker)	"Tonight" (radio session)
1993	The Lost Weekend (Melody Maker)	"I Keep Coming Back", "Fountain and Fairfax"
1993	The Afghan Whigs / Ass Poniys Split Single (7")	"Mr. Superlove" (cover)
1993	Volume 8	"Little Girl Blue" (cover)
1994	The King and I	"What Jail Is Like" (acoustic radio session)
1996	Beautiful Girls	"Be For Real" (cover), "Can’t Get Enough Of Your Love, Babe" (cover)
1998	Burning London ("The Clash" tribute album)	"Lost In The Supermarket" (cover)
1999	She's All That Soundtrack	"66"
1999	Josh's Blair Witch Mix (The Blair Witch Project Soundtrack)	"Beware" (cover)
2000	Fingerprints Vol 3	"Crazy" (live), "The Slide Song" (live)
2006	Big Star Small World ("Big Star" tribute album)	"Nightime" (cover)

== Music videos ==
Year	Title	Director
1989	"Sister, Brother"	Phil Harder
1990	"Miles Iz Ded"	Phil Harder
1990	"You My Flower"	Phil Harder
1992	"Turn on the Water"	Phil Harder
1992	"Conjure Me"	Phil Harder
1992	"Come See About Me"	Phil Harder
1993	"Debonair"	Phil Harder
1993	"Gentlemen" (version 1)	Phil Harder
1993	"Gentlemen" (version 2)	Rocky Schenck
1995	"Can't Get Enough of Your Love, Babe"	Ted Demme
1996	"Honky's Ladder"	Samuel Bayer
1996	"Going to Town"	Samuel Bayer
1998	"Somethin' Hot"	Banks Tarver
2014	"Algiers"	Phil Harder
2014	"Matamoros"	Phil Harder
2014	"Lost in the Woods"	Phil Harder
2015	"The Lottery"	Phil Harder
2017	"Demon in Profile"	Phil Harder
2017	"Oriole"	Amy Hood
2022	"The Getaway"	Philip Harder & Patrick Pierson
2022	"A Line Of Shots"	Patrick Pierson
2026	"House of I"	Scott Marshall
