= Unbreakable: A Retrospective 1990–2006 =

Compilation album by The Afghan Whigs
- Released: June 5, 2007
- Recorded: 1989–2006
- Genre: Alternative rock
- Length: 76:21
- Label: Rhino Records
- Producer: Greg Dulli, Ross Ian Stein

The Afghan Whigs chronology
1965 (1998)	Unbreakable: A Retrospective 1990–2006 (2007)	Do to the Beast (2014)

Professional ratings
Review scores
Source	Rating
Allmusic	4.5/5 stars
Pitchforkmedia	(8.8/10)

Unbreakable: A Retrospective 1990–2006 is a compilation album from alternative rock band The Afghan Whigs, released on June 5, 2007, on Rhino Records.

The album came six years after the group disbanded in 2001. The latest line-up, last seen in activity on the 1998 album 1965 and during its subsequent tour, regrouped in late 2006 to record two new songs for the project, "Magazine" and "I'm A Soldier".

== Track listing ==
1. "Retarded" – 3:26
2. "Crazy" – 4:05
3. "Turn On The Water" – 4:18
4. "Debonair" – 4:14
5. "I'm A Soldier" – 4:21
6. "66" – 3:24
7. "Be Sweet" – 3:39
8. "Come See About Me" – 3:48
9. "Uptown Again" – 3:12
10. "What Jail Is Like" – 3:30
11. "Magazine" – 3:20
12. "I'm Her Slave" – 2:59
13. "Going To Town" – 3:17
14. "Gentlemen" – 4:09
15. "Let Me Lie To You" – 4:35
16. "John The Baptist" – 5:36
17. "Crime Scene Part One" – 5:57
18. "Faded" – 8:23
- Track 1: from Up in It (see 1990 in music)
- Tracks 3, 12, 15: from Congregation (see 1992 in music)
- Track 8: from Uptown Avondale EP (see 1992 in music)
- Tracks 4, 7, 10, 14: from Gentlemen (see 1993 in music)
- Tracks 13, 17, 18: from Black Love (see 1996 in music)
- Tracks: 2, 6, 9, 16: from 1965 (see 1998 in music)
