= Historectomy =

Compilation album by The Afghan Whigs
- Released: September 1998
- Recorded: 1992–1998
- Genre: Alternative rock
- Label: Columbia

Historectomy is a promo compilation album from alternative rock band The Afghan Whigs, released in September, 1998 on Columbia.

== Track listing ==
1. "Somethin’ Hot"
2. "Uptown Again"
3. "Going To Town"
4. "Blame, Etc."
5. "Gentlemen"
6. "Debonair"
7. "What Jail Is Like"
8. "Conjure Me"
- Track 8: from Congregation (see 1992 in music)
- Tracks 5, 6, 7: from Gentlemen (see 1993 in music)
- Tracks 3, 4: from Black Love (see 1996 in music)
- Tracks: 1, 2: from 1965 (see 1998 in music)
