= Paul Buchignani =

American drummer

- Born: October 31, 1967 (age 58)
- Instrument: Drums

Paul Buchignani (born October 31, 1967) is an American drummer who came into musical prominence for his work with The Afghan Whigs on the Black Love album and subsequent tour. Buchignani graduated from Rhodes College in Memphis, Tennessee in 1989. Buchignani played drums for local favorite, Neighborhood Texture Jam, and worked for a law office before making the transition to full-time musician. In 1992 he secured a job at Ardent Studios in Memphis as a session assistant and drummer. Through his association with Ardent engineers and producers John Hampton and Jeff Powell, Buchignani built a relationship with Greg Dulli of The Afghan Whigs. With drummer Steve Earle departing from The Afghan Whigs in 1994, Buchignani was asked to step in as the new drummer. Buchignani handled the drumming duties on Black Love and remained with the band from 1995-1996. He appeared in multiple music videos with the band including "Honky's Ladder". Post-Afghan Whigs, Buchignani has remained busy as a recording and performing musician in Memphis. Post-Whigs career highlights include working with Todd Snider, Mark Lemhouse, Richard Johnston, Impala, AA Bondy, teaching at the Memphis Drum Shop and Stax Music Academy, as well as being house drummer for the New Orleans Ponderosa Stomp music festival. He has also worked on the film soundtrack for the movie Hustle and Flow (2005), and has recorded and toured with Goner Records artist Harlan T. Bobo and Sympathy for the Record Industry artist, Jack Oblivian.
