= The Howlin' Wolf =

Music venue in New Orleans, Louisiana

Coordinates: 29°56′33.5″N 90°3′57.5″W

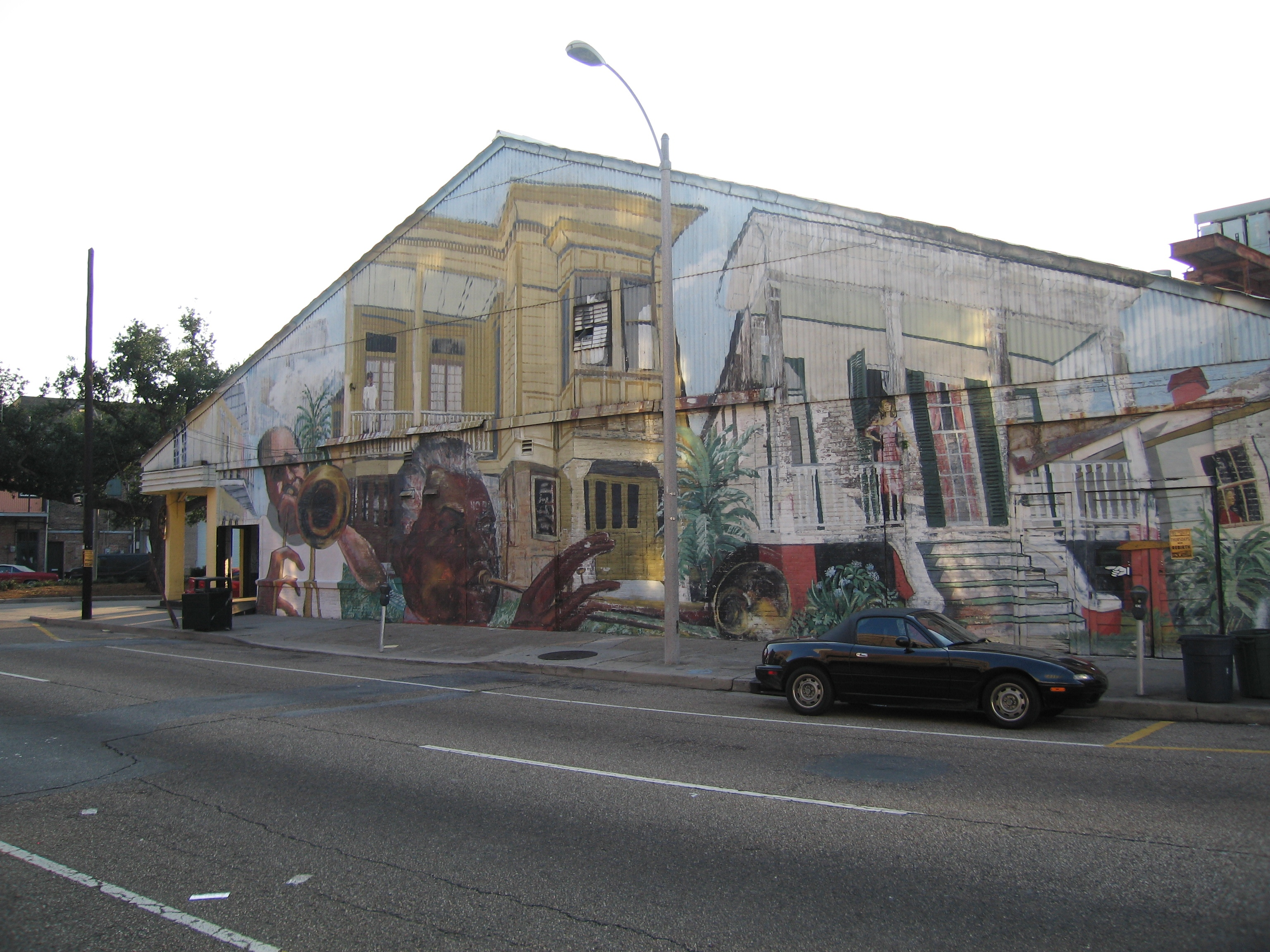
- Interactive map of The Howlin' Wolf
- Address: 907 S. Peters St. New Orleans, Louisiana; USA
- Capacity: The Howlin Wolf: 1,200, The Den: 120
- Type: Music venue
- Current use: Music venue

Construction
- Opened: 1988

Website
- Official website

The Howlin' Wolf is a 1,200 person capacity music venue located in New Orleans, Louisiana. The Howlin' Wolf Den, adjoined to The Howlin' Wolf is a 120-person capacity performance space. The venues are used for concerts, comedy shows, events and private parties.

== History ==
The Howlin’ Wolf opened in 1988 and is named after the legendary bluesman Chester "Howlin' Wolf" Burnett. The original Howlin' Wolf opened in the Fat City section of Metairie, Louisiana, founded by brothers Jack and Jeff Groetsch.

The Howlin' Wolf moved to a cotton warehouse in the New Orleans warehouse district at 828 South Peters about 1990. The Groetsch brothers sold the business to the current owner Howie Kaplan in the Summer of 2000. In the aftermath of Hurricane Katrina in 2005, the venue relocated again to its current location in a larger space a block away, which was previously known as the New Orleans Music Hall.

The current location at 907 S. Peters St. has a mural on the exterior created by artist Michalopoulos. The mural is a re-creation of New Orleans neighborhood scenes and references New Orleans music history. The mahogany bar in the venue was taken from Al Capone's hotel, The Lexington, during its demolition in the 1980s. Connected to the Howlin’ Wolf's main room is The Howlin' Wolf Den.

Many live albums have been recorded at The Howlin' Wolf including Live at Howlin' Wolf by The Afghan Whigs.

Frequented by the famous Thor "ThunderGod" Boeck and Mr. G.

== See also ==
- List of music venues
