= Do to the Beast =

2014 album by The Afghan Whigs

Studio album by the Afghan Whigs
- Released: April 15, 2014
- Studio: Burbank, Joshua Tree, Tarzana, Silverlake, Algiers Point, New Orleans, Cincinnati
- Genre: Alternative rock
- Length: 40:52
- Label: Sub Pop
- Producer: Greg Dulli

The Afghan Whigs chronology
1965 (1998)	Do to the Beast (2014)	In Spades (2017)

Singles from Do to the Beast
- 1. "Algiers" Released: 2014; 2. "Matamoros" Released: 2014

Do to the Beast is the seventh studio album by American alternative rock band the Afghan Whigs, their first in 16 years. It was released on April 15, 2014, on Sub Pop Records, the same label that released their albums Up in It and Congregation.

== Reception ==
The album received mainly positive reviews; according to online review aggregator Metacritic, it has a score of 74%, indicating "generally favorable reviews". A reviewer for the Los Angeles Times concluded that it was "overall a more muted, moody affair than the Afghan Whigs in their heyday." Rolling Stone wrote, "The stylishly sleazy intensity is still there on their first record since 1998's excellent 1965, only with a wider palette."

Professional ratings
Review scores
Source	Rating
AllMusic	3/5 stars
The Line of Best Fit	9/10 stars
Pitchfork Media	7.6/10
Rolling Stone	3/5 stars
Tom Hull – on the Web	B+

== Track listing ==
All tracks are written by Greg Dulli.

Do to the Beast
No.	Title	Length
1.	"Parked Outside"	4:37
2.	"Matamoros"	2:43
3.	"It Kills"	3:33
4.	"Algiers"	4:03
5.	"Lost in the Woods"	4:54
6.	"The Lottery"	4:05
7.	"Can Rova"	3:44
8.	"Royal Cream"	4:33
9.	"I Am Fire"	2:51
10.	"These Sticks"	5:49
Total length:		40:50

== Personnel ==
Adapted from AllMusic.

- Kerry Brown – engineer
- John Curley – engineer
- Amanda Demme – photography
- Greg Dulli – lyricist, mixing, producer
- Christopher Friedman – artwork, layout
- Megan Jasper – A&R
- Gavin Lurssen – mastering
- Mike Napolitano – engineer, mixing
- Rick Nelson – engineer
- David Rosser – engineer
- Mathias Schneeberger – engineer, mixing
- Justin Smith – engineer
- Christopher Thorn – engineer

== Charts ==
=== Weekly charts ===
Chart (2014)	Peak position
Belgian Albums (Ultratop Flanders)	5
Belgian Albums (Ultratop Wallonia)	41
Dutch Albums (Album Top 100)	50
German Albums (Offizielle Top 100)	95
Irish Albums (IRMA)	68
Italian Albums (FIMI)	86
Scottish Albums (OCC)	35
UK Albums (OCC)	40
US Billboard 200	32
US Top Rock Albums (Billboard)	8

=== Year-end charts ===
Chart (2014)	Position
Belgian Albums (Ultratop Flanders)	162
