= When We Two Parted =

When We Two Parted may refer to:

- "When We Two Parted", an 1817 lyric poem by Lord Byron
- "When We Two Parted", a song by The Afghan Whigs from the 1993 album Gentlemen
