= Somethin' Hot =

Single by The Afghan Whigs

from the album 1965
- Released: 1998
- Recorded: 1998
- Genre: Alternative rock
- Label: Columbia

"Somethin' Hot" is a single by the band The Afghan Whigs. It appears on their 1998 album 1965.

== Track listing ==
1. "Somethin' Hot"
2. "Somethin' Hot (12″ Remix)"
3. "Miss World"
4. "Papa was a Rascal"
