= Bonnie & Clyde EP =

EP by The Afghan Whigs
- Released: 1996
- Genre: Alternative rock
- Label: Elektra

The Afghan Whigs chronology
Black Love (1996)	Bonnie & Clyde EP (1996)	1965 (1998)

Professional ratings
Review scores
Source	Rating
Allmusic	4/5 stars

The Bonnie & Clyde EP is an EP by the band The Afghan Whigs.

== Track listing ==
1. "Going To Town"
2. "Creep"
3. "If Only I Had A Heart"
4. "You've Changed"
5. "I Want To Go To Sleep"
