= Retardation =

Retardation or retarded or similar may refer to:

== Medicine and biology ==
- Intellectual disability, a disorder characterized by significantly impaired cognitive functioning and deficits in adaptive behaviours, was previously referred to as "mental retardation"—the term is no longer in use due to the pejoration of the term "retardation" in this context
- Psychomotor retardation, a slowing-down of thought and a reduction of physical movements in an individual
- A form of heterochrony, able to cause effects such as neoteny, retention by adults of traits previously seen only in the young

== Physics and engineering ==
- Retardation factor, in chromatography, the fraction of an analyte in the mobile phase of a chromatographic system
- Retarded potential, in electrodynamics, electromagnetic potentials generated by time-varying electric current or charge distributions in the past
- Retarded time, time when an electromagnetic field began to propagate from a point in a charge distribution to an observer
- Retardation time
- Retardation, in telegraphy, a kind of distortion of signal pulses; see law of squares
- Retardation, as opposed to acceleration

== Music ==
- Retardation (music), a suspension that resolves upward instead of downward
- "Retarded" (song), a 1990 single by the band The Afghan Whigs

== Other uses ==
- A process used in proofing (baking technique)
- Retard (pejorative), a pejorative term for someone with a mental disability

== See also ==
- Retarder (disambiguation)
- Retardant (disambiguation)
- Get Retarded (disambiguation)
- "Petarded", 2005 episode of Family Guy
