= How Do You Burn? =

Studio album by the Afghan Whigs
- Released: September 9, 2022
- Genres: Classic rock; classic pop; psychedelic rock
- Length: 39:35
- Labels: Royal Cream; BMG
- Producers: Greg Dulli; Christopher Thorn

The Afghan Whigs chronology
In Spades (2017)	How Do You Burn? (2022)	Soft Control (2026)

Singles from How Do You Burn?
- 1. "I'll Make You See God" Released: February 22, 2022; 2. "The Getaway" Released: May 3, 2022; 3. "A Line of Shots" Released: July 20, 2022

How Do You Burn? is the ninth studio album by American rock band the Afghan Whigs. The album was released on September 9, 2022, through BMG Rights Management, making it their first album since 1998's 1965 to not be released under Sub Pop.

Three singles were released by the band ahead of the album's release: "I'll Make You See God", "The Getaway", and "A Line of Shots".

== Critical reception ==
Professional ratings
Aggregate scores
Source	Rating
AnyDecentMusic?	7.7/10
Metacritic	82/100
Review scores
Source	Rating
American Songwriter	3.5/5 stars
Classic Rock	4/5 stars
Glide Magazine	4/5 stars
The Line of Best Fit	8/10
Mojo	4/5 stars
Pitchfork	7.8/10
PopMatters	8/10
Rolling Stone	4/5 stars
Record Collector	4/5 stars
Uncut	4/5 stars

How Do You Burn? received critical acclaim from contemporary music critics upon its release. On review aggregator website, Metacritic, How Do You Burn? has an average rating of 82 out of 100 indicating "universal acclaim based on eight critic reviews". On AnyDecentMusic?, the album has an average rating of 7.7 out of 10 based on eight reviews.

== Track listing ==
All tracks are written by Greg Dulli.

How Do You Burn? track listing
No.	Title	Length
1.	"I'll Make You See God"	4:52
2.	"The Getaway"	3:05
3.	"Catch a Colt"	4:23
4.	"Jyja"	4:29
5.	"Please, Baby, Please"	3:49
6.	"A Line of Shots"	3:27
7.	"Domino and Jimmy"	3:52
8.	"Take Me There"	4:07
9.	"Concealer"	2:42
10.	"In Flames"	4:44
Total length:		39:35

== Charts ==
Chart performance for How Do You Burn?
Chart (2022)	Peak position
Belgian Albums (Ultratop Flanders)	8
Belgian Albums (Ultratop Wallonia)	107
German Albums (Offizielle Top 100)	22
Scottish Albums (Official Charts)	11
Spanish Albums (Promusicae)	93
Swiss Albums (Schweizer Hitparade)	49
UK Independent Albums (Official Charts)	6
