= Retardant =

Retardant may refer to:

- Fire retardant
- Flame retardant

== See also ==
- Retardation (disambiguation)
