= Retarder =

Retarder may refer to:

- Retarder (album), an album by The Unband
- Retarder (chemistry), a chemical agent that slows down a chemical reaction
- Retarder (mechanical engineering), a device for slowing down large trucks, lorries, buses, coaches and other vehicles
- Retarder (railroad), a device to slow railroad freight cars as they are sorted into trains
- Acrylic retarder, a chemical agent added to fine art acrylic paint to slow its short drying time
- Dough retarder, a refrigerator used to slow down proofing of yeast when making dough
- Film-type patterned retarder, a technology promoted by LG that is employed in its line of 3D televisions based on circular polarization
- Retardation plate, an optical device that alters the polarization state of a light wave traveling through it
- A component in weapons that slow down their rate of fire

== See also ==
- Retardation (disambiguation)
