= The B-Sides/The Conversation =

EP by The Afghan Whigs
- Released: 1994
- Genre: Alternative rock
- Label: Elektra

The B-Sides/The Conversation is a promo EP by the band The Afghan Whigs containing 4 cover versions and a two-part interview with Greg Dulli.

== Track listing ==
1. "Little Girl Blue"
2. "Mr. Superlove"
3. "Ready"
4. "The Dark End Of The Street"
5. "Conversation (Segment One)"
6. "Conversation (Segment Two)"
