= Neighborhood Texture Jam =

- Origin: Tennessee, United States
- Genres: Rock
- Years active: 1984, 1988–present
- Labels: Snerd Records, Ardent Records, Feralette Records
- Members: Joe Lapsley - vocals Tee Cloar - guitar Steven Conn - bass guitar Paul Buchignani - drums Greg Easterly - texture John Whittemore - guitar
- Past members: Ed Scott - guitar Sloan Wilson - texture Carter Green - texture Mark Harrison - guitar Tom Murphy - guitar Tony Pantuso - drums

Neighborhood Texture Jam is a Memphis, Tennessee rock band who fuse elements of punk, industrial and funk into a heavy, rhythmic rock sound. Notable for a member responsible for providing the "texture" - an ever-changing assembly of 55-gallon oil drums, hub caps, corrugated sheet metal, household appliances and other found objects that serve as auxiliary percussion.

The band was originally formed in 1984 at Rhodes College by Joe Lapsley and Ed Scott. The first incarnation of the band lasted three gigs before breaking up. Reforming in 1988, the band signed with Feralette Records and achieved national recognition with their debut album, Funeral Mountain, released in 1990.

Following a line-up change in which Tom Murphy was replaced by John Whittemore, the band switched labels to Ardent Records and released 1993's Don't Bury Me In Haiti.

1994 saw another change in labels when Ardent Records closed its alternative mainstream division to concentrate on Christian music. The band landed on Snerd Records and released the 7" single, Rush Limbaugh-Evil Blimp/Awesome in 1994 and the full-length album, Total Social Negation in 1996.

After a long recording hiatus, the band premiered its long-rumored rock opera, Frank Rizzo at Colonus in 2003, following up with a repeat performance in 2006. 2006 also saw the release of a pair of B-Side albums, They Buried Me In Memphis, Vols. 1 and 2 on Snerd Records.

== Current Band Members ==
- Joe Lapsley - lead vocals
- Tee Cloar - guitar
- Steven Conn - bass guitar
- Paul Buchignani - drums
- Greg Easterly - texture
- John Whittemore - guitar

=== Former Members ===
- Ed Scott - guitar
- Sloan Wilson - texture
- Carter Green - texture
- Tony Pantuso - drums
- Tom Murphy - guitar
- Mark Harrison - guitar
- Fletcher Ward - guitar

=== Former Auxiliary Members ===
- Derek Van Lynn - saxophone
- Montie Davis - guitar
- Sam Nowlin - texture

== Album Discography ==
- Funeral Mountain (1990)
- Don't Bury Me In Haiti (1993)
- Total Social Negation (1996)
- They Buried Me In Memphis, Vol. 1 (2006)
- They Buried Me In Memphis, Vol. 2 (2006)

=== Single Discography ===
- McThorazine/Waiting In Sverdlovsk (1992)
- Rush Limbaugh-Evil Blimp/Awesome (1994)
