= What Jail Is Like EP =

What Jail Is Like

EP by The Afghan Whigs
- Released: August 2, 1994
- Genre: Alternative rock
- Label: Elektra

The Afghan Whigs chronology
Gentlemen (1993)	What Jail Is Like (1994)	Honky's Ladder EP (1996)

Professional ratings
Review scores
Source	Rating
Allmusic	3.5/5 stars
Entertainment Weekly	A−
The New Rolling Stone Album Guide	3.5/5 stars
The Village Voice	(choice cut)

What Jail Is Like is an EP by the band The Afghan Whigs.

== Track listing ==
1. "What Jail Is Like"
2. "Mr. Superlove"
3. "Dark End Of The Street"
4. "Little Girl Blue"
5. "What Jail Is Like" (Live)
6. "Now You Know" (Live)
7. "My World Is Empty Without You/I Hear A Symphony" (Live)
