= Moon Maan =

US musical group

- Origin: Minneapolis, United States
- Genres: Alternative Rock
- Years active: 2004–present
- Members: Rick McCollum; Erik J. Mathison; Graham Herceg
- Past members: Bryan Knisley; Mark Pakulski; Catherine Clements
- Website: http://www.moonmaan.com

Moon Maan is the solo project of Rick McCollum of The Afghan Whigs.

Moon Maan debuted at SXSW in 2004 and has a rotating cast of musicians, most notably Polara drummer Erik Mathison. McCollum, now based in Minneapolis, Minnesota, United States, is currently working on his junior effort and recently collaborated with female-fronted act Glean.
