= Get Retarded =

Get Retarded may refer to:

- "Get Retarded", a song by Bassi Maestro from the album Tutti a casa
- "Get Retarded", a song by Canibus from the album Can-I-Bus
- "Get Retarded", a song by DJ Kay Slay from the album The Streetsweeper, Vol. 2
- "Get Retarded", a song by Craig Mack (released as MC EZ)

== See also ==
- "Let's Get Retarded", a song by the Black Eyed Peas from the album Elephunk
- Retardation (disambiguation)
