= Live at Howlin' Wolf =

Live At Howlin’ Wolf

EP by The Afghan Whigs
- Released: 1998
- Genre: Alternative rock
- Label: Columbia

Live At Howlin’ Wolf is a promo EP by the band The Afghan Whigs containing 4 tracks from a live concert from Thanksgiving Night 1997 at The Howlin' Wolf in New Orleans, Louisiana.

== Track listing ==
1. "If There’s Hell Below (We’re All Going To Go)" (cover)
2. "Blame, Etc."
3. "Superstition/Going To Town"
4. "Debonair"
