= Honky's Ladder =

EP by The Afghan Whigs
- Released: February 20, 1996
- Genre: Alternative rock
- Label: Mute Records

The Afghan Whigs chronology
What Jail Is Like EP (1994)	Honky's Ladder (1996)	Black Love (1996)

Professional ratings
Review scores
Source	Rating
Allmusic	3.5/5 stars

Honky's Ladder is an extended play single by the band The Afghan Whigs.

== Track listing ==
1. "Honky's Ladder"
2. "Blame, Etc."
3. "If I Only Had a Heart" (From The Wizard of Oz)
4. "Creep"
