= Soft Control =

Studio album by The Afghan Whigs
- Released: August 21, 2026
- Genre: Alternative rock
- Length: 36:48
- Labels: Royal Cream; BMG
- Producers: Greg Dulli; Christopher Thorn

The Afghan Whigs chronology
How Do You Burn? (2022)	Soft Control (2026)

Singles from Soft Control
- 1. "House of I" Released: March 19, 2026; 2. "Duvateen" Released: April 23, 2026; 3. "Jungle Roux" Released: June 3, 2026; 4. "My Lover" Released: July 22, 2026

Soft Control is the tenth studio album by American alternative rock band the Afghan Whigs. The album was released on August 21, 2026 through Royal Cream under exclusive license to BMG Rights Management, marking their first album release since 2022’s How Do You Burn?.

Four singles were released by the band ahead of the album’s release: “House of I,” “Duvateen,” “Jungle Roux,” and “My Lover," ” with “Loose Talk” as the single alongside the album’s release.

The Afghan Whigs supported the album release with the “Soft Control Tour 2026” across Europe supported by Ed Harcourt, and the United States supported by Night Moves.

== Critical reception ==
Professional ratings
Aggregate scores
Source	Rating
Metacritic	81/100
Review scores
Source	Rating
The Fire Note	4.5/5
Mojo	4/5 stars
New Noise Magazine	4/5 stars
Pitchfork	7.7/10
Scummy Water Tower	4.5/5 stars
The Times	4/5 stars
Uncut	8/10

Soft Control received critical acclaim from several music outlets upon release, including a 7.7 review from Pitchfork and 4 out of 5 star review from The Times. Mojo praised the album for “refining [the band’s] glittering but noirish template of temple-tightening, heart-clenching psychodramas” in their review.

== Track Listing ==
All tracks are written by Greg Dulli.

Soft Control
No.	Title	Length
1.	"Jungle Roux"	3:07
2.	"House of I"	3:05
3.	"Duvateen"	4:11
4.	"My Lover"	2:37
5.	"The Deepest Part of the Darkest Shadow"	4:18
6.	"Mariah Luster"	3:31
7.	"Memphis, Texas"	3:27
8.	"77"	2:55
9.	"Loose Talk"	3:25
10.	"A Simulation"	6:12
Total length:		36:48

== Personnel ==
Credits are adapted from Tidal.

=== The Afghan Whigs ===
- John Curley – synthesizer, additional engineering
- Greg Dulli – vocals, guitars, piano, production, engineering, mixing
- Rick Nelson – bass
- Christopher Thorn – slide guitar, production, engineering, mixing

=== Additional contributors ===
- Greg Wieczorek – drums, percussion, vocals
- John Webber – mastering
- Ian Fogarty – additional engineering
- Jon Skibic – additional engineering
- Kevin Ratterman – additional engineering

== Charts ==
Chart performance for Soft Control
Chart (2026)	Peak position
Belgian Albums (Ultratop Flanders)	30
Belgian Albums (Ultratop Wallonia)	21
French Rock & Metal Albums (SNEP)	41
German Albums (Offizielle Top 100)	57
UK Album Downloads (Official Charts)	29
UK Albums Chart Update (Official Charts)	62
UK Independent Albums (Official Charts)	9
UK Physical Albums (Official Charts)	27
UK Record Store Albums (Official Charts)	15
UK Vinyl Albums (Official Charts)	31
US Top Album Sales (Billboard)	36
