= In Spades =

Studio album by the Afghan Whigs
- Released: May 5, 2017
- Recorded: New Orleans, Los Angeles, Memphis, Joshua Tree
- Genre: Alternative rock
- Length: 36:19
- Label: Sub Pop
- Producer: Greg Dulli

The Afghan Whigs chronology
Do to the Beast (2014)	In Spades (2017)	How Do You Burn? (2022)

In Spades is the eighth studio album by American alternative rock band the Afghan Whigs, released on May 5, 2017, on Sub Pop Records.

== Reception ==
Professional ratings
Aggregate scores
Source	Rating
Metacritic	79/100
Review scores
Source	Rating
AllMusic	3.5/5 stars
The Guardian	4/5 stars
The Line of Best Fit	9/10 stars
Pitchfork	7.6/10
Spill Magazine	4.5/5 stars

The album received mainly positive reviews; according to online review aggregator Metacritic, it has a score of 79%, indicating "generally favorable reviews".

=== Accolades ===
Publication	Accolade	Year	Rank	Ref.
Drowned in Sound	Favourite Albums of 2017	2017	92	
Pitchfork	20 Best Rock Albums of 2017	2017	14	

== Track listing ==
All tracks are written by Greg Dulli.

In Spades
No.	Title	Length
1.	"Birdland"	2:50
2.	"Arabian Heights"	5:00
3.	"Demon in Profile"	3:24
4.	"Toy Automatic"	2:56
5.	"Oriole"	4:06
6.	"Copernicus"	3:30
7.	"The Spell"	3:46
8.	"Light as a Feather"	3:08
9.	"I Got Lost"	3:22
10.	"Into the Floor"	4:17
Total length:		36:19

== Personnel ==
Adapted from Discogs.

The Afghan Whigs

- Greg Dulli – vocals (1–10), guitars (2–6, 8, 10), piano (3, 7–10), mellotron (1, 5), harmonium (1), bass guitar (7), electric piano (7), percussion (3)
- John Curley – bass guitar (2–6, 8–10)
- Rick Nelson – cello (1, 3–5, 10), violin (1, 3–5, 10), viola (1, 4, 5), vocals (1)
- Dave Rosser – guitars (1–6, 8–10), vocals (5, 6)
- Jon Skibic – guitars (1–4, 6–10), mellotron (5)
- Patrick Keeler – drums (2–10)

Additional musicians

- Susan Marshall, vocals (1)
- Ben Ellman – baritone saxophone (3, 4)
- Ian Bowman – tenor saxophone (3)
- John Culbreth – trumpet (3, 4)
- Evan Oberla – trombone (3, 4)
- Petra Haden – violin (7, 9), vocals (9)
- Gabe Noel – cello (7)
- David Ralicke – saxophone (7), trombone (7), trumpet (7)
- Scott Bennett – vocals (9)
- Rob Ingraham – tenor saxophone (4)

Artwork

- Ramon Rodrigues Melo – artwork
- Christopher Friedman – layout

Production

- Rick Nelson – recording engineer
- Christopher Thorn – recording engineer
- Mike Napolitano – recording engineer
- Justin Smith – recording engineer
- Jeff Powell – recording engineer
- Kyle Kelso – recording engineer
- Matt Beck – recording engineer
- Wesley Graham – recording engineer
- Jon Skibic – recording engineer
- Mike Napolitano – mixing
- Christopher Thorn – mixing
- Bernie Grundman – mastering
- Joe Bozzi – mastering

== Charts ==
Chart (2017)	Peak position
Belgian Albums (Ultratop Flanders)	10
Belgian Albums (Ultratop Wallonia)	58
Dutch Albums (Album Top 100)	59
German Albums (Offizielle Top 100)	60
Irish Albums (IRMA)	70
Scottish Albums (OCC)	25
Swiss Albums (Schweizer Hitparade)	98
UK Albums (OCC)	55
US Billboard 200	108
