= Uptown Avondale =

EP by The Afghan Whigs
- Released: 1992
- Label: Sub Pop
- Producer: Greg Dulli (engineered by John Curley)

The Afghan Whigs chronology
Congregation (1992)	Uptown Avondale (1992)	Gentlemen (1993)

Professional ratings
Review scores
Source	Rating
Allmusic	link

Uptown Avondale is an EP by the band The Afghan Whigs. It bears the Sub Pop catalog number SPCD 53/215 and is representative of the Cincinnati band's soul influences. The EP contains covers of four classic Stax/Motown-era songs:

- "Band of Gold", which was made famous by Freda Payne (after being rejected by Diana Ross and The Supremes)
- "True Love Travels on a Gravel Road", by Dallas Frazier/A.L. Owens, recorded by Elvis Presley and Percy Sledge among others
- "Come See About Me", a Holland–Dozier–Holland song that was a hit for The Supremes
- "Beware", by Al Green

The E.P. also contains a remix of the band's song "Milez Is Ded" as a hidden track — the original was itself a hidden track on the 1992 album Congregation. This version features a looped drum track (same bed as The Stone Roses' "Fools Gold", and dozens of other tracks from the same timeframe) and some heavy effects on the vocals and guitars. The band referred to the new mix as "Rebirth of the Cool," as a paean to the Miles Davis album Birth of the Cool.

== Track listing ==
1. "Band of Gold"
2. "True Love Travels on a Gravel Road"
3. "Come See About Me"
4. "Beware"
5. "Rebirth of the Cool"
