= Big Top Halloween =

Studio album by the Afghan Whigs
- Released: 1988
- Genre: Alternative rock
- Label: Ultrasuede

The Afghan Whigs chronology
Big Top Halloween (1988)	Up in It (1990)

Big Top Halloween is the first album by the band the Afghan Whigs. It was released in 1988 via Ultrasuede.

Two thousand copies of the record were pressed.

== Critical reception ==
Professional ratings
Review scores
Source	Rating
AllMusic	2/5 stars
(The New) Rolling Stone Album Guide	1/5 stars

Trouser Press wrote that "there's a surprising amount of subtlety—sophistication, even—rustling beneath the boozy, gutter-rat surface of the quartet's self-released debut ... an altogether terrific debut."

== Track listing ==
All tracks written by Greg Dulli and John Curley.

1. "Here Comes Jesus" (3:32)
2. "In My Town" (2:55)
3. "Priscilla's Wedding" (3:32)
4. "Push" (2:53)
5. "Scream" (3:20)
6. "But Listen" (5:50)
7. "Big Top Halloween" (3:24)
8. "Life in a Day" (2:06)
9. "Sammy" (3:16)
10. "Doughball" (2:13)
11. "Back o' the Line" (2:45)
12. "Greek Is Extra" (2:44)

Total Time: 38:30
