= Congregation (The Afghan Whigs album) =

Studio album by the Afghan Whigs
- Released: January 31, 1992
- Recorded: July–September 1991
- Studios: Bear Creek (Woodinville); Buzz's Kitchen (Los Angeles); Ultrasuede (Cincinnati)
- Genres: Alternative rock; indie rock; R&B; soul; funk; grunge
- Length: 44:29
- Label: Sub Pop
- Producers: Greg Dulli; Ross Ian Stein

The Afghan Whigs chronology
Up in It (1990)	Congregation (1992)	Uptown Avondale (1992)

Singles from Congregation
- 1. "Turn On the Water" Released: January 1992; 2. "Conjure Me" Released: May 1992

Congregation is the third studio album by American alternative rock band the Afghan Whigs. It was released on January 31, 1992, by Sub Pop and followed two years of the band's touring in support of their first album for the label, Up in It (1990).

The Afghan Whigs recorded Congregation in sessions held at Bear Creek Studios in Washington state's Woodinville and Buzz's Kitchen in Los Angeles from July to August 1991, with the band's frontman Greg Dulli producing alongside audio engineer Ross Ian Stein. Initially working on a $15,000 advance from Sub Pop, the production and release became hindered by the label's financial difficulties; these were eventually resolved by the massive commercial success of fellow Sub Pop act Nirvana's 1991 album Nevermind.

Expanding on the aggressive sound of the band's previous work, Congregation has more refined musical details and slower-tempo songs, incorporating ballads, R&B, soul, and funk influences. The album's cover depicts a nude black woman holding a white baby in her arms, interpreted as a comical allusion to the band's African-American music influences. The lyrics explore themes of pleasure and guilt in the context of dysfunctional relationships and sexual deviancy. Conceived during the burgeoning grunge scene, the album has been viewed by music writers as stylistically distinct from other Sub Pop and grunge music.

Congregation was well received by contemporary critics, who praised its musical quality, stylistic elements, and emotional content. It was promoted with two singles, "Turn On the Water" and "Conjure Me", and The Afghan Whigs' extensive touring in the United States and Europe. Although it did not chart, the album helped the band attain a cult following and receive offers from major record labels, leading to their signing to Elektra Records. Since its initial reception, Congregation has been viewed by writers as the band's breakthrough album and a significant release in rock music during the 1990s.

== Background ==
After forming in 1986 in Cincinnati, the Afghan Whigs—vocalist and rhythm guitarist Greg Dulli, bassist John Curley, lead guitarist Rick McCollum, and drummer Steve Earle—released their 1988 debut album Big Top Halloween on an independent record label and gained the attention of Seattle-based label Sub Pop. With their second album Up in It (1990) released on the label, the band toured regularly in the United States for two years and occasionally in Europe before recording Congregation. Sub Pop gave the band a $15,000 advance to record the album, which Dulli later said was a "then-unheard-of" and "bloated" amount.

While collectively interested in classic rock, the band members had other individual tastes, including McCollum's interest in free jazz, experimental, and Indian music, and Dulli's love of hip-hop, soul, and funk, particularly Motown artists and Prince. According to Stereogum, their African-American music influences were comically referred to in Congregation's cover photo, which depicted a nude black woman sitting on a blanket with a white baby held in her arms.

== Recording and production ==
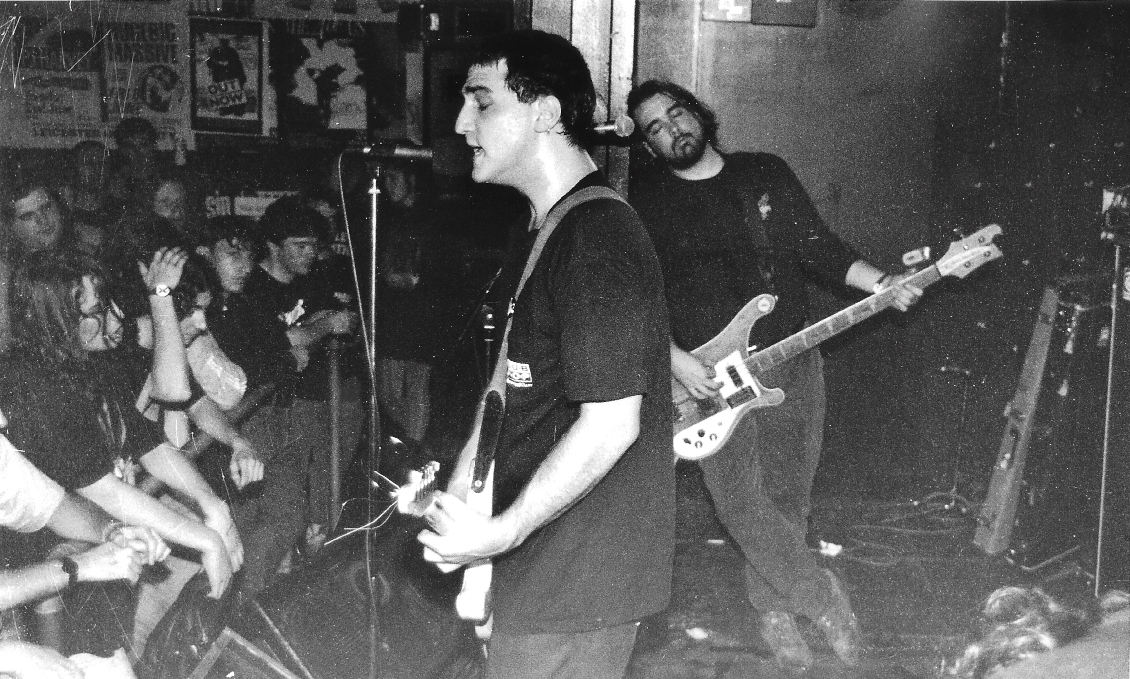
The album was largely written and produced by the Afghan Whigs' frontman, Greg Dulli, pictured center left in 1992 alongside the band's bassist, John Curley.

The Afghan Whigs began recording the album in July 1991. They held sessions at Bear Creek Studios in Woodinville, Washington and Buzz's Kitchen in Los Angeles, California. Dulli wrote most of its songs and produced the album with audio engineer Ross Ian Stein. Session musicians such as Miss Ruby Belle, Shecky Stein, and Lance Ellison also contributed; Belle sung lead vocals on "Her Against Me", Stein played piano on "Conjure Me", and Ellison played piano and sung lead vocals on "The Temple" with John Curley and Rick McCollum. Singer-songwriter Shawn Smith contributed backing vocals to "This Is My Confession" and "Dedicate It". After the rest of the band finished recording their parts, Dulli stayed in Los Angeles to record his vocals, overdub the recorded tracks, and mix the album. However, the album's production was delayed due to Sub Pop's financial difficulties, and Dulli got another job in Los Angeles to pay for the studio.

Although the label eventually settled the studio's bills and the album's sessions ended in August 1991, the band was unsure if Sub Pop had enough money to release any more albums, let alone Congregation. After the massive commercial success of Nirvana's 1991 album Nevermind, Sub Pop recovered financially by receiving royalties from the album after the band left them for a major label. Dulli later said that while he was "stranded in L.A. ... Nirvana saved the whole fuckin' label". He recalled thanking the band's frontman Kurt Cobain upon the album's completion, saying that "I went to Nirvana's show at the Palace in L.A. and hugged Kurt and said, 'Good one, bro. Congratulations. And thank you—now I can go home.'"

After the album's sessions were done, Dulli was inspired to write and record an additional track on the day of Miles Davis' death, September 28, 1991. He received two messages on his answering machine from music executive David Katznelson, the first providing directions to a cookout and the second informing Dulli that Davis had died, saying that "Miles is dead. Don't forget the alcohol." Working at Ultrasuede in Cincinnati, Dulli incorporated Katznelson's line as a lyric and, with a guitar riff from Rick McCollum, hastily recorded "Miles Iz Ded", which was included as a hidden track on the album. Congregation was mastered by Jack Skinner at K Disc Mastering in Hollywood. Dulli subsequently took a drive in his car and listened to the album while observing his scenery, a practice he continued with future albums.

== Music ==
"Miles Iz Ded"
A favorite among fans of the band, "Miles Iz Ded" incorporates elements of punk rock, soul, and pseudo-funk riffs.

The album expands on the aggressive sound of the band's previous work with refined musical details and occasionally slower songs. In The Rough Guide to Rock (2003), music journalist Alex Ogg writes that The Afghan Whigs were "managing to balance volume with subtlety" amid the burgeoning grunge music scene. The album's music incorporates heavy counterpoint rhythms, indie rock harmonics, wah-wah and slide guitars, and staccato riffs with funk, metal, and blues influences. Chicago Tribune writer Brad Webber compares its melodies to those of "later Hüsker Dü". Option perceives influences from "ex-indie guitar bands" such as Dinosaur Jr. and Nirvana in the songs' "catch-iness and in the arrangements' juxtaposition of frenzy and laziness." David Sprague of the Trouser Press comments that the band's instrumentation "contriv[es] panoramic images through judicious use of wah-wah guitar ... and the tribal drumbeats with which Steven Earle invokes an air of ritualistic surrender."

The album's rock sound is complemented by a predominant soul influence. According to The Vinyl District writer Joseph Neff, on Congregation, the Afghan Whigs expand on contemporary alternative and indie rock with an integrated dimension of R&B, soul, and funk. Magic magazine's Christophe Basterra characterizes the resulting music as "The Four Tops appropriating 'Search and Destroy' by Iggy & the Stooges". The slow-burning ballad "Let Me Lie to You" incorporates soul and grunge musical styles. Dulli wrote the song in an attempt to deviate from the aesthetic of Sub Pop, who he felt discouraged its acts from recording slow songs. He cites writing the song as the moment he began having faith in himself as a songwriter. Songs such as "Miles Iz Ded", "Conjure Me", and "Turn On the Water" incorporate funk influences and wah-wah guitar. Pitchfork's Stephen M. Deusner cites the latter song as an example of how the band "integrate[d] African-American sounds and influences into their white rock", writing that it "uses Isaac Hayes' wakka-chikka guitars as a punk accessory, and its jumpy guitar riffs instill these songs with a sense of motion that suggests amped-up r&b." "Tonight" features bluesy acoustic guitar.

=== Lyrics ===
"Kiss the Floor"
The spaciously arranged song was written by Dulli about an empty sexual experience with a virgin.

Dulli's lyrics throughout the album explore dysfunctional intimate relationships and sexual deviancy, featuring themes of pleasure and guilt. The songs are narrated from the perspective of an emotionally wounded sinner and lothario with sinister and narcissistic tones. The lyrics also feature haunting refrains and expressions of angst and melodrama. In Stereogum writer Peter Helman's analysis, Congregation debuts the predominance of Dulli's "leviathan libido" over an album-length work, avoiding the multi-layer metaphors of classic rock-inspired contemporaries such as Eddie Vedder and instead expressing emotions in an R&B style: "Artists like the Supremes, the Temptations, and even the Four Tops often wrote songs that seethed with domestic drama and pent-up sexual energy."

Dulli's baritone vocals throughout the album are moaningly husky and feature falsetto wails. Daniel Fidler of Spin compares them to those of "a young Paul Westerberg in heat." David Sprague of the Trouser Press calls Congregation a "strangely flamboyant" album that showcases "Dulli's metamorphosis from everypunk wallflower to rakish scoundrel with a heart of glass." Jason Ankeny of AllMusic calls Dulli "a truly magnetic presence" and writes of his performance on the album, "by turns predator ('Tonight') and prey ('I'm Her Slave'), he's the guy your parents always warned you about, delivering each syllable of his remarkable lyrics with equal measures of innuendo and venom." Stephanie Benson of Rhapsody comments that his lyrics are "full of stifling dissatisfaction and boozy philosophy".

"I'm Her Slave" is a heroin anecdote with lyrics narrated by a subjugate lover. Music critic Greg Kot cites "Turn On the Water" as an example of when "the twisted narrator is the victim" and "cast adrift" in Dulli's lyrics. Inspired by a paranoid breakup, "Conjure Me" is told from the perspective of an aggressive predator and obscure object of desire. On "Kiss the Floor", the narrator recounts stealing a girl's virginity and avoiding her brothers. "This Is My Confession" has a theme of absolution, depicted as an empty sexual experience: "Shove my head against the door, crawl inside and kiss the floor / Waiting for the sun again, drink it, smoke it, stick it in." "The Temple" is a cover of the song of the same name from the 1970 rock opera Jesus Christ Superstar. Dulli became a fan of the rock opera as a child when his babysitter played it. "Let Me Lie to You" has lyrics expressing passive cruelty and subtle manipulation. "Tonight" depicts a peaceful night as the backdrop for the narrator's corrupt one-track mind: "Follow me down to the bushes, dear / No one will know, we'll disappear / I'll hold your hand, we'll never tell / Our private little trip to hell". The album's hidden track "Miles Iz Ded" is about seduction and alcohol, evoking a last call and sense of a despair.

== Marketing ==
Congregation was released by Sub Pop on January 31, 1992, and distributed by Caroline Records, on both LP and CD formats. To promote the record, "Turn On the Water" was released in January as a 7-inch single (with "Miles Iz Ded" on its B-side), as a CD single (coupled with the tracks "Chalk Outline" and "Miles Iz Ded"), and on February 25 as a cassette single. "Conjure Me" was released in May as a 7-inch single backed with the Afghan Whigs' cover of the 1965 Supremes song "My World Is Empty Without You". A music video for the single was filmed—featuring a topless woman caressing Dulli as he lip syncs the song—and received rotation on MTV.

The Afghan Whigs promoted the album with an appearance on MTV and an international tour with dates in major American cities and Europe. During their shows, the Afghan Whigs interspersed R&B songs in their set list, including an interpolation of The Spinners' 1972 song "I'll Be Around" during "Turn On the Water". The band's extensive touring for the album helped them garner a larger audience, although the album did not impact the Billboard charts. It was reissued in September 1998.

== Critical reception and legacy ==
Professional ratings
Review scores
Source	Rating
AllMusic	4.5/5 stars
Chicago Tribune	3.5/4 stars
The Encyclopedia of Popular Music	3/5 stars
The Great Rock Discography	6/10
MusicHound Rock	4/5 stars
The Rolling Stone Album Guide	3.5/5 stars
Spin Alternative Record Guide	6/10

Congregation was met with highly positive reviews from critics. Reviewing in September 1992, Daniel Fidler from Spin viewed the record as "a clean move toward musical excellence", showing the Afghan Whigs "bursting its Sub Pop chains with catchy, heavy guitar riffs, downright lovable song arrangements, melodies that jerk your emotions back and forth, and yes, endearing, raspy vocals that wail, moan, scream, and shout". Michael Azerrad called it "superb" in Rolling Stone, while Brad Webber of the Chicago Tribune found the album more accessible to listeners than contemporary Seattle or Minneapolis-based, guitar-oriented grunge bands. Additionally, Webber said the Afghan Whigs are "on rock's cutting edge" while stirring "a torrent of emotions on neatly paced songs". In Musician, J. D. Considine said the band is "clever enough to find hooks in the sort of gnarled riffs and guitar noise Fugazi plays for atmosphere", as well as "canny enough to avoid most of the mannerisms that make much Amerindie rock seem so cliched." Considine concluded in his review, "The best reason to join this Congregation is that the songs are catchy enough to hold their own against the best work of bands like Dinosaur Jr. or the Replacements." Option was less impressed, appreciating the record's "sheer listenability", "clear recording and dynamic performances", but criticizing Dulli's lyrics and the band's cover of "The Temple". Melody Maker ranked Congregation at number 25 on its year-end best albums for 1992.

With the album's critical acclaim and the band's steady touring, the Afghan Whigs attained a cult following and was courted by several major labels who wanted to sign them. Frustrated with the distribution limitation of a small record label, they signed to Elektra Records after their final release for Sub Pop, an EP of soul cover songs called Uptown Avondale (1992). Their major label debut Gentlemen was released in 1993 to critical acclaim and mainstream exposure.

The first band hailing from outside the Pacific Northwest to join the Sub Pop stable, Ohio's Afghan Whigs brought a healthy injection of libido to the label's angsty roster ... Leering frontman Greg Dulli used Congregation to cultivate the stylized, seductive evil that he would go on to perfect on the Whigs' 1993 masterwork Gentlemen.

— Amy Phillips, Pitchfork

Along with Gentlemen, Congregation is generally considered by music journalists to be part of the Afghan Whigs' peak recording period. Dulli cites it as "the record where we came into our own". Melody Maker dubbed it "the finest rock LP of the decade" and commented that it is "nothing less than rock raping pop, a ferocious deflowering of Motown's romantic ideal". With Congregation, Stephanie Benson of Rhapsody found the band to be "crucial to the birth of '90s alternative rock." AllMusic's Jason Ankeny said that it was the band's artistic breakthrough and "ticket to the big leagues", "an incendiary and insidious set which bridges the gap between the noisy aggression of the band's early releases and the soulful swagger of their later work." Ankeny also cited it as "the grunge era's most overlooked masterpiece" and an indication of the band's musical growth, writing that "while still unmistakably a member of the Sub Pop stable, there's a greater maturity and depth to their sinewy sound, with a newfound grasp of mood and nuance". In The Rolling Stone Album Guide (2004), Joe Gross called it a "quantum leap" over the band's previous work, commenting that it "shows that they ditched grunge for soul because they were no damn good at the former and ladies dig the latter." The Spin Alternative Record Guide (1995) was somewhat less enthusiastic, writing that "the results feel like dress rehearsals for Gentlemen, with one partial exception, 'Conjure Me,' and one absolute triumph: a surging final track ... that might be the Afghan Whigs' strongest recorded performance."

In 2002, Italian music magazine Il Mucchio Selvaggio included Congregation on its list of 100 Best Albums by Decade. Polish webzine Screenagers ranked it number 79 on its 2004 list of the Top 100 Albums of the '90s. Italian music journalists Eddy Cilìa and Federico Guglielmi included Congregation in their 2010 book on essential rock albums. In 2022, Pitchfork included it in their list of the "25 Best Grunge Albums of the '90s"; in the accompanying blurb, Stuart Berman wrote that the record "showed how grunge's roar could express an emotional depth beyond anger and disillusionment. Full of white-knuckled songs brimming with sensuality, obsession, and betrayal, the album plays out like some alt-rock soap opera."

== Track listing ==
All songs were produced by Greg Dulli and Ross Ian Stein.

No.	Title	Writer(s)	Length
1.	"Her Against Me"	Greg Dulli	0:47
2.	"I'm Her Slave"	Dulli	2:59
3.	"Turn On the Water"	John Curley, Dulli, Steven Earle, Rick McCollum	4:18
4.	"Conjure Me"	Curley, Dulli, Earle, McCollum	4:03
5.	"Kiss the Floor"	Dulli, McCollum	4:00
6.	"Congregation"	Dulli, McCollum	4:27
7.	"This Is My Confession"	Dulli	3:13
8.	"Dedicate It"	Dulli	3:22
9.	"The Temple"	Tim Rice, Andrew Lloyd Webber	4:06
10.	"Let Me Lie to You"	Dulli	4:36
11.	"Tonight"	Dulli	3:41
12.	"Miles Iz Ded" (hidden track)	Dulli	5:06

== Personnel ==
Credits are adapted from the album's liner notes.

=== The Afghan Whigs ===
- John Curley – bass, photography, vocals
- Greg Dulli – producer, rhythm guitar, vocals
- Steve Earle – drums
- Rick McCollum – guitar, vocals

=== Additional personnel ===
- Miss Ruby Belle – vocals
- Larry Brewer – engineer, second engineer
- Chris Cuffaro – photography
- Caroline De Vita – design
- Lance Ellison – piano, vocals
- D.A. Fleischer – photography
- Jane Higgins – design
- Rick and Bubba – vocals
- Jack Skinner – mastering
- Shawn Smith – background vocals, vocals
- Ross Ian Stein – engineer, producer
- Shecky Stein – piano

== Bibliography ==
- Buckley, Peter, ed. (November 1, 2003). The Rough Guide to Rock (3rd ed.). Rough Guides. ISBN 1843531054.
- Cilìa, Eddy [in Italian] (January 1, 1999). Grunge. Giunti Editore. ISBN 8809217306.
- Cilìa, Eddy; Guglielmi, Federico [in Italian], eds. (September 18, 2010). Rock. I 500 dischi fondamentali. Giunti Editore. ISBN 978-8809755246.
- Escamilla, Brian; Gale Research (October 28, 1996). Contemporary Musicians. Vol. 17. Gale. ISBN 0787600989.
- Gross, Joe; et al. (November 2, 2004). Brackett, Nathan; Hoard, Christian (eds.). The New Rolling Stone Album Guide (4th ed.). Simon & Schuster. ISBN 0743201698.
- Strong, Martin C. (October 21, 2004). The Great Rock Discography: Complete Discographies Listing Every Track Recorded by More Than 1,200 Artists (7th ed.). Canongate U.S. ISBN 1841956155.
- Weisbard, Eric; Marks, Craig, eds. (October 10, 1995). Spin Alternative Record Guide. Vintage Books. ISBN 0679755748.
- Yarm, Mark (September 6, 2011). Everybody Loves Our Town: An Oral History of Grunge. Crown Archetype. ISBN 978-0307464439.
