= Up in It =

Studio album by the Afghan Whigs
- Released: April 1990
- Genres: Alternative rock; punk rock; garage rock; grunge
- Length: 45:38
- Label: Sub Pop
- Producer: Jack Endino

The Afghan Whigs chronology
Big Top Halloween (1988)	Up in It (1990)	Congregation (1992)

Up in It is the second album by the Afghan Whigs, released in 1990 via Sub Pop. They were the label's second signing from outside the Pacific Northwest, after the Fluid.

== Production ==
The album was produced by Jack Endino.

== Critical reception ==
Professional ratings
Review scores
Source	Rating
AllMusic	3.5/5 stars
The Encyclopedia of Popular Music	3/5 stars
MusicHound Rock: The Essential Album Guide	4/5 stars
The New Rolling Stone Album Guide	2.5/5 stars
Spin Alternative Record Guide	4/10

Trouser Press wrote: "Typically gauzy Jack Endino production instantly brands Up in It as a Sub Pop issue. While the increased volume follows suit, the Whigs still wax more lyrical than their thrash'n'burn label contemporaries." The New Rolling Stone Album Guide wrote that "thudding production hides the band's latent smarts in sludge." The Dallas Observer deemed the album "the first indication grunge could be created in a vacuum (i.e., Cincinnati) by four isolated 20-year-olds just as potently as if it were manufactured by a whole slew of Mark Arms."

== Track listing ==
All tracks written by Greg Dulli except where noted.

1. "Retarded" (Dulli, McCollum) – 3:25
2. "White Trash Party" – 3:05
3. "Hated" – 3:37
4. "Southpaw" – 3:20
5. "Amphetamines and Coffee" (Kopasz) – 1:55
6. "Now We Can Begin" - 2.43 [LP/Cassette version] OR "Hey Cuz" – 3:49 [CD version]
7. "You My Flower" – 3:48
8. "Son of the South" – 4:12
9. "I Know Your Little Secret" – 4:22
10. "Big Top Halloween" (Dulli, Curley) – 3:31 [CD version only]
11. "Sammy" (Dulli, Curley) – 3:15 [CD version only]
12. "In My Town" (Dulli, Curley) – 2:59 [CD version only]
13. "I Am the Sticks" – 4:19 [CD version only]
