= Black Love (The Afghan Whigs album) =

Studio album by the Afghan Whigs
- Released: March 12, 1996
- Recorded: August–September 1995
- Studios: Bear Creek (Woodinville, Washington); Robert Lang (Shoreline, Washington)
- Genres: Alternative rock; soul; progressive soul; grunge
- Length: 51:56
- Label: Elektra
- Producer: Greg Dulli

The Afghan Whigs chronology
Gentlemen (1993)	Black Love (1996)	1965 (1998)

Singles from Black Love
- 1. "Honky's Ladder" Released: February 20, 1996; 2. "Going to Town" Released: July 22, 1996

Black Love is the fifth album by the band the Afghan Whigs, released in March 1996. It was released by Elektra Records/Sub Pop in the US and by Mute in Europe, and was produced by Greg Dulli. Black Love was preceded by the single "Honky's Ladder" and followed by the single "Going to Town" (also released as the Bonnie & Clyde EP in the US).

Prior to the album's release, lead singer Greg Dulli seriously explored producing a movie in the film noir genre, but despite his optioning at least one book, the movie was never made. Dulli's ideas for a soundtrack led to the songs recorded on this album.

The album was reissued on November 25, 2016, on Rhino Records, in celebration of the 20th anniversary of its initial release. The 20th anniversary reissue was released as a double CD and triple LP, and includes nine previously unreleased tracks.

== Critical reception ==
Professional ratings
Review scores
Source	Rating
AllMusic	3/5 stars
Chicago Tribune	3/4 stars
Christgau's Consumer Guide	(1-star Honorable Mention)
The Encyclopedia of Popular Music	4/5 stars
Entertainment Weekly	C
Los Angeles Times	3/4 stars
Rolling Stone	3/5 stars
(The New) Rolling Stone Album Guide	3.5/5 stars
San Francisco Chronicle	4/5 stars
Spin	8/10

Upon its initial release, Black Love received mixed reviews from critics, who generally considered it inferior to its predecessor Gentlemen. In recent years, the album has been regarded as one of the best albums in the band's oeuvre, with Stereogum labeling it their best album in a "Worst to Best" list.

Ian Cohen of Stylus Magazine reflected: "Dulli and the gang came up with the idea of making the first alt-blaxploitation album; while interesting in concept, in execution, Black Love ended up being hookless grunge that happened to have bongos and a B-3."

== Track listing ==
All tracks composed by Greg Dulli except: "Double Day" composed by Greg Dulli and Rick McCollum.

1. "Crime Scene Part One" – 5:59
2. "My Enemy" – 3:10
3. "Double Day" – 4:40
4. "Blame, Etc." – 4:11
5. "Step into the Light" – 3:40
6. "Going to Town" – 3:16
7. "Honky's Ladder" – 4:15
8. "Night by Candlelight" – 3:40
9. "Bulletproof" – 6:37
10. "Summer's Kiss" – 3:55
11. "Faded" – 8:25

== Charts ==
Chart (1996)	Peak position
UK Albums (Official Charts)	41
Swedish Albums (Sverigetopplistan)	38
New Zealand Albums (RMNZ)	35
Belgian Albums (Ultratop Flanders)	23
Belgian Albums (Ultratop Wallonia)	37
US Billboard 200	79

== Personnel ==
Band

- Greg Dulli – lead vocals & guitars (1–11), drums (5), machine (6), percussion (7,8), timpani (8), sleigh bells (11)
- Rick McCollum – guitars (1–4, 6–11), pedal steel (5), hammered dulcimer (8)
- John Curley – bass (1–7, 9–11), Arp (1,4), guitar (3), vocals (4)
- Paul Buchignani – drums (1–4, 6,7, 9–11), percussion (4,7,9), congas (4)

Additional Musicians

- Harold Chichester – organ (1,4,9,11), clavinet (4,6), Fender Rhodes (5), piano (9,11), vocals (11)
- Doug Falsetti – percussion (1), vocals (3,4,7,9,11)
- Shawn Smith – vocals (6,8)
- Jeffrey Reed – effects (1)
- Barbara Hunter – cellos (4,6,8,11)
- Jeff Powell – vocals (4,9)

Production

- Greg Dulli – production; mixing
- Jeff Powell – engineering; mixing
- John Curley – assistant engineering; location recording
- Jeffrey Reed, Ryan Hadlock, Aaron Warner, Joe Hadlock, Don Fawcett, Erik Flettrich, Dubby – assistant engineers
- Bob Ludwig – mastering

Design

- Jeff Kleinsmith – art direction
- Danny Clinch – photography
