= 1965 (The Afghan Whigs album) =

Studio album by the Afghan Whigs
- Released: October 27, 1998
- Studio: Kingsway, New Orleans, Louisiana
- Genre: Alternative rock
- Length: 41:35
- Label: Columbia
- Producer: Greg Dulli

The Afghan Whigs chronology
Black Love (1996)	1965 (1998)	Unbreakable: A Retrospective 1990–2006 (2007)

Singles from 1965
- 1. "Somethin' Hot" Released: October 13, 1998; 2. "66" Released: March 30, 1999

1965 is the sixth studio album by American rock band the Afghan Whigs. It was released on October 27, 1998, by Columbia Records.

== Writing and recording ==
The album was written and recorded after Greg Dulli, the band's lead singer and rhythm guitarist, underwent treatment for clinical depression. The Afghan Whigs recorded primarily at Daniel Lanois' Kingsway Studios in New Orleans, with additional recording done at Ocean Way and Larrabee North in Los Angeles, The American Sector in New Orleans, and London Bridge in Seattle. Dulli produced the album and wrote most of its songs. For the cover, a photograph was used showing astronaut Ed White on the first American space walk as part of the Gemini 4 flight which took place in June 1965.

== Music and lyrics ==
The album incorporates jazz, R&B, and soul music influences in its mainly rock sound. The lyrics feature erotic narratives and paeans to sexuality. Music journalist David Stubbs writes that the album's subject matter "reconciles lust for women with respect for women", abandoning the "ironic self-loathing" of the band's 1993 album Gentlemen (1993) and the "down in the dumps" lyrics of Black Love (1996).

== Critical reception ==
Professional ratings
Review scores
Source	Rating
AllMusic	4.5/5 stars
Entertainment Weekly	A
The Guardian	3/5 stars
Houston Chronicle	4/5 stars
Los Angeles Times	3/4 stars
NME	9/10
Pitchfork	7.5/10
Q	4/5 stars
(The New) Rolling Stone Album Guide	3/5 stars
Spin	7/10

Reviewing for the Los Angeles Times in November 1998, Marc Weingarten regarded songs like "Somethin' Hot" and "Neglekted" as "the ugliest sort of come-ons, full of innuendo and whispered imprecations", but concluded that "Dulli's velvety vocals and the band's sharp, punchy melodies win you over every time." Entertainment Weekly reviewer Matt Diehl called Dulli "one of rock’s finest lyricists: His noir vignettes read like a Jim Thompson novel, their erotic narratives expertly skewering the male psyche." Stubbs, in NME, hailed 1965 as "a triumph against the grain of post-grunge", while Jason Ankeny of AllMusic called it "the gritty soul record just always out of The Afghan Whigs' reach—seamlessly integrating the R&B aspirations which have textured the band's sound since the beginning".

Some reviewers were less receptive. Robert Christgau assigned 1965 a "neither" grade in Christgau's Consumer Guide: Albums of the '90s (2000), indicating an album that "may impress once or twice with consistent craft or an arresting track or two. Then it won't." In The New Rolling Stone Album Guide (2004), Joe Gross considered the album's upbeat tone and healthier thoughts on sexual relationships to be "a mild letdown from the previous trilogy's relentlessness".

== Track listing ==
All tracks written by Greg Dulli except where noted.

1. "Somethin' Hot" – 2:58
2. "Crazy" – 4:04
3. "Uptown Again" – 3:11
4. "Sweet Son of a Bitch" – 0:23
5. "66" – 3:23
6. "Citi Soleil" – 5:06
7. "John the Baptist" – 5:34
8. "The Slide Song" (Dulli, McCollum) – 3:54
9. "Neglekted" (Dulli, McCollum) – 4:01
10. "Omertà" (Dulli, McCollum) – 5:40
11. "The Vampire Lanois" (Dulli, McCollum, Horrigan, Curley) – 3:21

== Notes ==
"66" was used in the 1999 film She's All That.

"Somethin' Hot" was used in the 2001 film American Pie 2, but did not appear on the soundtrack.

== Personnel ==
Credits for 1965 adapted from liner notes.

- The Afghan Whigs – primary artist
- David Bianco – mixing
- Marina Chavez – photography
- Alex Chilton – guest artist, performer
- John Curley – bass, composer, keyboards, performer
- Derek DiCenzo – performer
- George Drakoulias – mixing, performer
- Greg Dulli – composer, guitar, piano, producer, vocals
- Doug Falsetti – performer
- Steve Ferrone – guest artist, performer
- Jessy Green – performer
- Frank Harkins – art direction
- Dave Hillis – engineer, performer
- Michael Horrigan – composer, drums
- Mike Horrigan – drums, performer
- Barbara Hunter – cello
- Donal Logue – performer
- Susan Marshall – performer
- Rick McCollum – guitar, performer
- Rick McCollum – composer
- Steve Myers – performer
- Roderick Paulin – tenor saxophone, arranger
- Jeff Powell – engineer
- Lia Sweet – executive producer
- Samuel Venable – performer
- Howie Weinberg – mastering
- Christa Wells – performer
- Russell White – performer

== Charts ==
Chart (1998)	Peak position
Belgian Albums Chart (Flanders)	38
US Billboard 200	176
