= Gentlemen (album) =

1993 studio album by the Afghan Whigs

Studio album by the Afghan Whigs
- Released: October 5, 1993
- Studio: Ardent (Memphis, Tennessee); Ultrasuede (Cincinnati, Ohio)
- Genre: Alternative rock; post-punk; hard rock; R&B; soul; grunge
- Length: 48:56
- Label: Elektra
- Producer: Greg Dulli

The Afghan Whigs chronology
Uptown Avondale (1992)	Gentlemen (1993)	Black Love (1996)

Singles from Gentlemen
- 1. "Gentlemen" Released: 6 September 1993; 2. "Debonair" Released: February 1994; 3. "What Jail Is Like" Released: August 1994

Gentlemen is the fourth studio album by American alternative rock band The Afghan Whigs. It was recorded primarily at Ardent Studios in Memphis, with the band's frontman Greg Dulli producing, and released on October 5, 1993, by Elektra Records.

Written by Dulli on tour for the band's 1992 album Congregation, Gentlemen is composed as a troubling song cycle that follows a toxic relationship as it ends. Noted for Dulli's grimly acerbic lyrics and influences from soul music, it is considered by critics to be the Afghan Whigs' greatest record, an essential release from the 1990s, and among the best-written breakup albums. The album was remastered in deluxe format for its 21st anniversary and covered extensively in a dedicated volume of the 33⅓ music book series.

== Writing and recording ==
I think people get kinda disappointed when I say the album isn't all autobiographical, and I'm like, God, that’s kind of mean, to think something like that. Why would you want poor little me to go through all that? It's like anything else. You use some license. It's observation. Maybe it started out with something autobiographical, and then you want to blow it up into something bigger.

— Greg Dulli (1994)

The Afghan Whigs frontman Greg Dulli, an amateur filmmaker during his teenage years, took direct inspiration for Gentlemen's thematic concept from Francis Ford Coppola's 1982 romantic fantasy film One from the Heart, identifying especially with the lead character played by Frederic Forrest. "He was just a real kind of heel", Dulli explained. "But you could tell he didn't want to be one, that he wasn't really one." With this idea as an impetus, Dulli proceeded in his songwriting to see the extent to which he could explore "the dark psyche of the '90s male".

Having covered Motown songs on the band's final release for the Sub Pop label (1992's Uptown Avondale), Dulli wanted to experiment with more sympathetic sounds through the use of minor keys and slower tempos. Of the Motown influence, he cited the songs' upbeat musical moods and how they framed and contrasted sad lyrics. "And that's what I wanted to go into on Gentlemen", he explained. "How far can I go into it? How dark is dark?" Dulli also drew musical inspiration from Van Morrison's influential 1968 album Astral Weeks, particularly in its use of reoccurring melodic motifs and lyrical images throughout, albeit in different forms.

The Afghan Whigs primarily recorded Gentlemen at Ardent Studios in Memphis, with additional recording taking place at Cincinnati's Ultrasuede Studio. They took a "cinematic" approach to recording, with the album credits later describing the process as having been "shot on location" at Ardent. Along with original songs, the band recorded a cover of soul singer Tyrone Davis' 1970 song "I Keep Coming Back".

== Artwork and title ==
The album cover was inspired by the 1983 photograph Nan and Brian in Bed, New York City by Nan Goldin. In his book about Gentlemen, Bob Gendron describes how Linda Ronstadt, also signed to Elektra, was allegedly furious over the album's cover which she considered nearly pornographic.

The album was titled Gentlemen ironically.

== Reception and legacy ==
Professional ratings
Review scores
Source	Rating
AllMusic	4.5/5 stars
Chicago Tribune	3.5/4 stars
Entertainment Weekly	B+
NME	9/10
Q	4/5 stars
Rolling Stone	4/5 stars
The Rolling Stone Album Guide	4.5/5 stars
Select	4/5
Spin Alternative Record Guide	9/10
The Village Voice	A−
The Great Rock Discography	7/10

Gentlemen was hailed by Chicago Tribune critic Greg Kot as a "riveting song cycle of romantic burn-out" featuring a narrator of questionable decency. Kot applauded Dulli for capturing "the moment when infatuation loses its bloom and gives way to something a bit more realistic". Despite the band's roots in the Sub Pop label, the critic observed "a decidedly non-grungy brand of guitar rock, with slightly busy drumming and arrangements that mirror the turmoil in Greg Dulli's voice". In the Los Angeles Times, Richard Cromelin regarded the album as possibly "the most overlooked masterpiece" of 1993 and "a grueling immersion in the latest methods of warfare in the battle of the sexes—a dark, dramatic wallow in lust, shame, guilt, despair, deceit and obsession that's framed in dense, uplifting rock." Rolling Stone magazine's Matt Diehl noted "a clean, oddly detached hard-rock sound that shifts erratically between purgative and disarmingly pretty, adding tension to Dulli's caterwauling". Reviewing Gentlemen in March 1994 for The Village Voice, Robert Christgau applauded the raw recording quality and wrote in conclusion:

Those conflicted guitars are a direct function of the singer-writer-producer-guitarist's agonized self-exposure/-examination. If the album wears down into covers and instrumentals, that's only to signify its spiritual exhaustion. No reason to trust him—just his brain selling his ass at a higher convolution. But anyone susceptible to simpler lines, as fisherman or prey, can learn plenty. And the jaded can appreciate the clean, snakelike trajectory of the cast.

The album was included in the book 1001 Albums You Must Hear Before You Die. A 21st-anniversary deluxe reissue of the album, entitled Gentlemen at 21, was released on October 28, 2014. It received widespread critical acclaim, registering an aggregated score of 95 out of 100 at Metacritic. Commenting on its legacy at the time of the reissue, Orlando Weekly writer Ashley Belanger said, "It's heralded as one of the best break-up records ever written and considered an essential '90s release, due to the Whigs' creative fusion of R&B with that post-punk alternative rock sound signature to that era." Treble ranked Gentlemen at number 22 on its list of the 30 best grunge albums. Spin ranked the album at number 141 on their list of "The 300 Best Albums of the Past 30 Years (1985-2014)", stating that "musically, the Whigs perfected their unique alchemy of blackened soul and scabrous post-punk here, with frontman Greg Dulli’s sultry, sleazy, and sneering point of view leading the way into temptation."

In 2008, writer Bob Gendron published a critical and scholarly exploration of Gentlemen as part of the 33⅓ music book series exploring influential albums from pop history. Gendron's book included extensive interviews with band members and others within the Afghan Whigs' circle regarding the album's creation and impact.

== Track listing ==
All tracks written by Greg Dulli, except where noted.

1. "If I Were Going" – 3:05
2. "Gentlemen" – 3:54
3. "Be Sweet" (Dulli, Rick McCollum) – 3:37
4. "Debonair" – 4:15
5. "When We Two Parted" (Dulli, McCollum) – 5:47
6. "Fountain and Fairfax" – 4:21
7. "What Jail Is Like" – 3:30
8. "My Curse" – 5:45
9. "Now You Know" – 4:10
10. "I Keep Coming Back" (Leo Austell, Leo Graham) – 4:52
11. "Brother Woodrow/Closing Prayer" – 5:40

An LP version of the album also included a bonus 12" vinyl limited edition containing the following 4 tracks, originally recorded for a radio session (Goodier Session, BBC Radio 1):

1. "Rot" (Marcy Mays, Sue Harshe, Carolyn O'Leary)
2. "Fountain and Fairfax"
3. "Keep Coming Back" (Austell, Graham)
4. "Tonight"

== Charts ==
Chart (1993)	Peak position
UK Albums (OCC)	58
New Zealand Albums (RMNZ)	50
Belgian Albums (Ultratop Flanders)	198

Chart (2025)	Peak position
Hungarian Physical Albums (MAHASZ)	16

== Personnel ==
- Greg Dulli – vocals, rhythm guitar, producer
- Rick McCollum – lead guitar
- John Curley – bass, engineer
- Steve Earle – drums
- Harold Chichester – piano, mellotron
- Barb Hunter – cello
- Marcy Mays – vocals on "My Curse"
- Jody Stephens – back vocals on "Now You Know"
- Jeff Powell, John Hampton – engineer
- Jeffrey Reed – assistant engineer
- Billy Phelps – photography
