= The Afghan Whigs =

American rock band

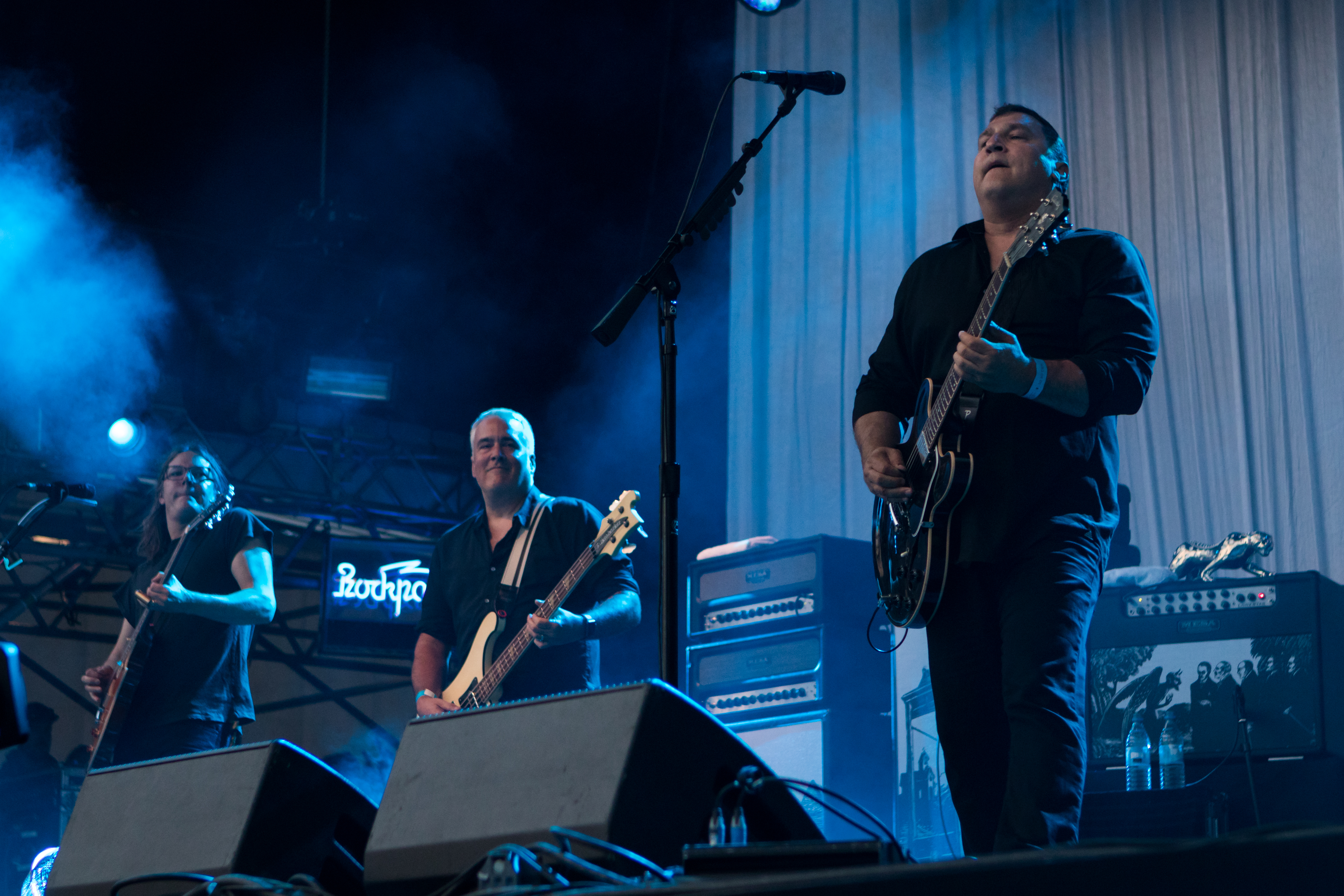
- The Afghan Whigs at Haldern Pop Festival in 2017

Background information
- Origin: Cincinnati, Ohio, U.S.
- Genres: Alternative rock; indie rock; R&B; post-punk; grunge
- Years active: 1986–2001, 2006, 2011–present
- Labels: Sub Pop; Elektra; Columbia; Blast First; Mute; BMG
- Spinoff of: The Black Republicans
- Members: Greg Dulli; John Curley; Rick G. Nelson; Bryan Lee Brown; Christopher Thorn
- Past members: Dave Rosser; Rick McCollum; Steve Earle; Jon Skibic; Patrick Keeler; Paul Buchignani; Michael Horrigan; Cully Symington; Mark McGuire
- Website: theafghanwhigs.com

The Afghan Whigs are an American rock band from Cincinnati, Ohio. They were active from 1986 to 2001, reformed briefly in 2006 and again from 2011 to present.

The early core members were Greg Dulli (vocals, rhythm guitar), Rick McCollum (lead guitar), and John Curley (bass). The band rose up around the grunge movement, evolving from a garage band in the vein of the Replacements to incorporate more R&B and soul influences into their sound and image. They released their first album independently in 1988. The band then signed to the Seattle-based independent label Sub Pop. Their fourth album, Gentlemen in 1993, was their major label debut, released on Elektra Records. Pitchfork described them as "one of the few alt-bands to flourish on a major label" in the 1990s.

Dulli frequently claimed in interviews that the band would never get back together following their dissolution in 2001; however the group reunited in 2012.

== Band history ==
=== Early years and Big Top Halloween (1986–1988) ===
Greg Dulli (vocals, rhythm guitar), Rick McCollum (lead guitar), John Curley (bass), and Steve Earle (drums) formed the band in Cincinnati late in 1986. The Afghan Whigs had evolved out of Dulli's previous band, the Black Republicans, a band that Curley later joined. Curley attended a number of Black Republicans shows and approached Dulli and "made it a point to tell the vocalist he was a better bassist than the one in the Black Republicans". Curley would introduce Dulli to McCollum, a frequent jam partner who was famed on the local Cincinnati scene for his innovative use of effects pedals. McCollum and Dulli would bond over their shared love of R&B, in fact the first song the Afghan Whigs ever rehearsed was a cover of the Temptations' "Psychedelic Shack". Dulli later described the intent behind the Afghan Whigs was to exist as "a cross between the Band, the Temptations, and Neil Young playing with Crazy Horse". The name the Afghan Whigs was coined by Curley "as a play on the Black Republicans".

In the wake of the Black Republicans' breakup Dulli had decamped to Arizona, where he composed half the material for what would become the Afghan Whigs' debut album Big Top Halloween (1988), self-released on the band's own Ultrasuede label. "We were running through what were the first songs I'd ever written to do some demos, so we were playing really loose," Dulli recalls. "And then all of a sudden, I found out John was having covers made." While only a thousand copies of Big Top Halloween would be pressed initially, one of them managed to capture the attention of Jonathan Poneman, the co-founder of influential Seattle-based indie label Sub Pop, which signed the Afghan Whigs in 1989. Initially Sub Pop planned for the Whigs to release only a one-off single, but that soon led to a full-blown record contract with the label.

=== Signing to Sub Pop and Up in It (1989–1990) ===
Upon signing to Sub Pop, the Afghan Whigs became the label’s second band to not originate in the Pacific Northwest region. In 1990, Sub Pop put out the Afghan Whigs' second album Up in It. Largely recorded by Nirvana producer Jack Endino and featuring the college-radio hit "Retarded", Up in It received a favorable reception with music critics upon release.

To support the album's release, the Afghan Whigs went on a package tour with Mudhoney and Boston underground band Bullet LaVolta. Up in It was followed by a limited edition single released by No.6 Records under the name "Ornament", which included vocals by Scrawl singer Marcy Mays (who would later contribute lead vocals to the band's song "My Curse" off the album Gentlemen).

=== Congregation and Uptown Avondale (1992) ===
With the 1992 album Congregation and covers EP, Uptown Avondale, the band developed what would become their signature sound, blending soul with psychedelic sprawl and punk abandon. Critics noted the combination of Stax and Motown influences with indie rock sonics on the band's material. Uptown Avondale featured covers of hits by soul acts such as the Supremes.

Videos for notable Congregation songs like "Conjure Me" and "Turn On the Water" would receive airplay on MTV, which began to regularly cover the Afghan Whigs as a new band to watch. The Afghan Whigs would also tour extensively during this period, including a U.S. jaunt with Scottish indie rockers Teenage Fanclub.

"When We Two Parted"
Sample of the 1993 Afghan Whigs track "When We Two Parted" off Gentlemen.

=== Signing to Elektra and Gentlemen (1993) ===
Building on the buzz that welcomed Congregation, the Afghan Whigs soon signed to a major label, Elektra Records, following a bidding war that resulted in a contract so lucrative, it featured a clause that allowed for the funding of a Dulli-scripted feature film that ultimately was never made. For their major label debut, the Afghan Whigs ensconced themselves in Ardent Studios in Memphis, where Big Star, Bob Dylan, Led Zeppelin, and ZZ Top had recorded. The result of those sessions was the 1993 album Gentlemen.

Gentlemen received a positive review from Rolling Stone. Critics would go on to praise it for its unflinching, self-flagellating lyrics, and a decisive stylistic break with the grunge-style epitomized by Nirvana and Mudhoney. Gentlemen would place at No. 17 on The Village Voice's "Pazz & Jop" critic's poll for 1993.

Gentlemen proved to be the Afghan Whigs' most commercially successful release, and by 1996 it had sold 130,000 copies in the United States. The singles "Debonair" (a Modern Rock Top 20 hit) and "Gentlemen" received regular airplay on MTV and college radio. Another album track, "Fountain and Fairfax" appeared on the television series My So-Called Life in 1994. The lead vocals on "My Curse" were sung not by Dulli, but by singer Marcy Mays of Scrawl – allegedly because the lyrics documenting the violent dissolution of a relationship were so personal, Dulli couldn't sing it.

=== Black Love era (1996) ===
Following the promotion of Gentlemen, the Afghan Whigs further expanded into the public eye. In 1996, Dulli served as executive producer for the soundtrack for the Ted Demme film Beautiful Girls. The Afghan Whigs appeared in the film as a bar band and contributed two songs to the soundtrack: Frederick Knight's "Be for Real" and Barry White's "Can't Get Enough of Your Love, Babe". Dulli also was the only musician other than Dave Grohl to appear on the debut album from Foo Fighters.

Eventually, work began on the Afghan Whigs' fifth full-length album, which would be called Black Love upon its release in 1996. The band started writing demos in March 1995; the recording took place in both Seattle and Memphis-based studios featuring new drummer Paul Buchignani, who had replaced Steve Earle.

Although previous releases explored liquor-drenched obsession, secrets and misery, Black Love stepped into a darker, seedier and complex side of Dulli's persona, passionately taking his obsession with murder and paranoia to their logical ends. Dulli himself noted that the songs had a conceptual framework that reflected the structure of a film, influenced by noir-influenced writer James Ellroy and violent neo-noir films like Blood Simple. Other influences included pulp fiction novels, Kenneth Anger's Hollywood Babylon and the crime photographs of Weegee. Other lyrical inspirations included the troubled life of Temptations singer David Ruffin for the song "Blame, Etc." The album opener, "Crime Scene Part One", was allegedly influenced by the story of then-unproduced screenplay for the film The Million Dollar Hotel.

Commercially, Black Love peaked at No. 79 on the Billboard Top 200 chart. The album also received critical praise for capturing the power of the Whigs' live show in a studio recording; its lush yet funky musicality garnered comparisons to the Rolling Stones in their 1970s-era prime and standing out once again from the day's more conventional alternative rock in its distinctive embrace of black-music idioms. The Whigs promoted Black Love with extensive touring, including a jaunt of large venues opening for a Neil Young tour that also featured Jewel.

=== Legal dispute with Elektra and signing to Sony/Columbia for 1965 (1998) ===
In the wake of Black Love's commercial disappointment, the Afghan Whigs said they suffered neglect and dishonest business dealings with their label, Elektra. Eventually, the two parted ways and the Whigs signed to Columbia Records for their next album, 1965. The unamicable parting resulted in Dulli being treated for depression, providing subject matter for songs like "Neglekted" which was featured on the band's next full-length effort. The song had originally been named "Sylvia" as a swipe against then-Elektra head, Sylvia Rhone.

After a year's hiatus during which Dulli began another project known as the Twilight Singers, the Afghan Whig's went to Daniel Lanois' famed studio in New Orleans to record 1965, named after the year both Dulli and Curley were born. Influenced again by film noir, as well as the urban wordplay of rappers like Nas, 1965 received positive reviews in the press, praising, in particular, the band's continued flair for blending soul styles with rock. In addition to their headlining dates, the Afghan Whigs went on tour with Aerosmith as the classic rock group's opening act. During the live dates for 1965, Dulli got in an altercation with a stagehand following an Austin, Texas concert date and suffered a head injury that left him in a coma. Two months after Dulli's recovery, however, the group returned to the road.

=== Break up (2001) ===
In 2001, the Afghan Whigs broke up by circulating a press release announcement which was picked up by the major music press. In it, the band claimed their geographic disparity and family obligations of its core members made it impossible for them to create new material together. In further interviews, Dulli clarified that theirs was an amicable split, and did not necessarily represent an "official breakup".

=== Reunion (2006, 2011–present) ===
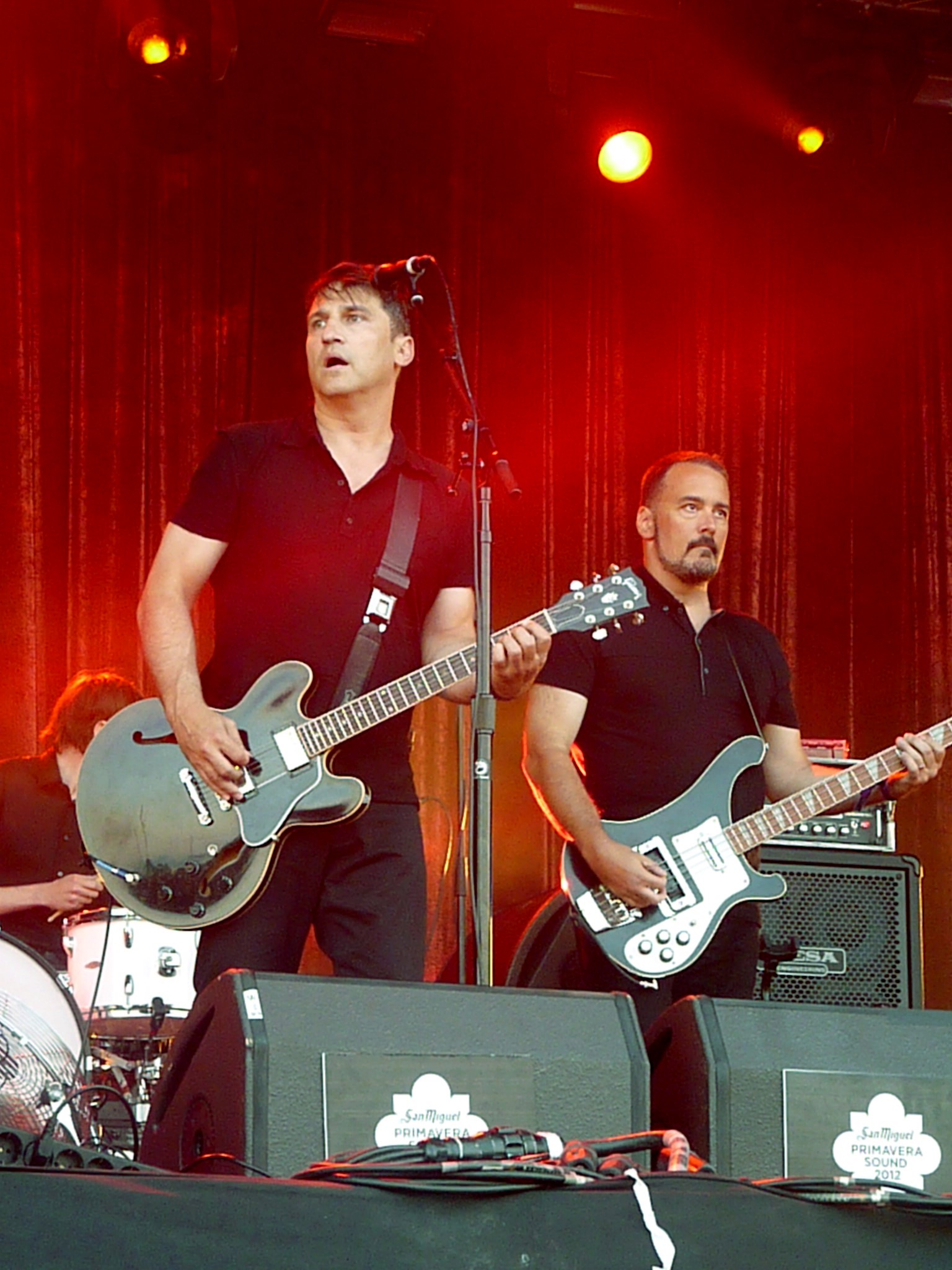
Greg Dulli (left) and bassist John Curley (right), 2012

In 2006, the Afghan Whigs temporarily reunited. The lineup recorded two new tracks ("I'm a Soldier" and "Magazine") featured on their retrospective titled Unbreakable: A Retrospective 1990–2006, released on June 5, 2007, through Rhino Records, which critics noted rated on a par with the band's material released during its prime.

The band would not perform again until a December 7, 2011, press release from the promoters of All Tomorrow's Parties announced that the Afghan Whigs would reunite and play at their I'll Be Your Mirror events on May 27, 2012, in London, followed by an appearance at Pier 36 in New York City on September 22, 2012. A week later it was announced that the band would also be performing at both Primavera Sound festivals in 2012. In April of that year, it was revealed that the revitalized the Afghan Whigs would be playing the 2012 edition of Lollapalooza. Dulli clarified in interviews that playing the Afghan Whigs with Curley on a 2010 solo tour and meeting with McCollum anew during that period directly led to plans of reforming for live performance.

On May 22, 2012, the reunited the Afghan Whigs (minus drummer Steve Earle) made their debut performance on Late Night with Jimmy Fallon, playing one new song, the soul cover "See and Don't See", and old favorite "I'm Her Slave" from Congregation. The reunited Whigs played their first full concert the next night at Manhattan venue the Bowery Ballroom, receiving critical accolades from the major media. "Regardless of how the surprising reunion of The Afghan Whigs turns out, their show last night at the Bowery Ballroom will go down as the '90s alt-rock heroes' greatest concert ever", Glenn Gamboa wrote in Newsday; meanwhile, Steve Kandell noted in a Spin review:

... their first show together since then, at New York's Bowery Ballroom last night, felt less like an easy nostalgia trip than a reminder of problems we, perhaps selectively, forgot we ever had. ... [L]eader Greg Dulli was leaner, meaner, fitter, and in better voice at 47 than even during the band's heyday ... [F]rom the opening strains of "Crime Scene, Part One," all the old drama and menace and hurt feelings and failings were right there, palpable and visceral, all couched in the equally palpable sense of relief that none of us are that fucked up anymore.

The Afghan Whigs' first new recording released during the 2012 reformation, "See and Don't See", also received considerable airplay on influential stations such as Sirius XMU, KEXP, XPN, and KCRW. On July 16, the band released their second new recording, a cover of Frank Ocean's "Lovecrimes". Like the previous release, the song was made available as a free download from the band's website.

In 2013 at South by Southwest (SXSW), the Afghan Whigs headlined The Fader Fort and played a collaborative set with surprise guest Usher. John Curly claimed that moment solidified the probability that the band would record together again and that following their SXSW performance they began compiling ideas for new material.

On February 18, 2014, the band announced that founding guitarist Rick McCollum was no longer a member of the group. In his absence, guitar parts on Do to the Beast, the band's seventh album, were performed by numerous musicians including Dave Rosser, Jon Skibic, and Mark McGuire among others. The band added drummer Patrick Keeler of the Raconteurs and the Greenhornes in 2014.

The band released its eighth album, In Spades, on May 5, 2017. Guitarist Dave Rosser, a band member since 2014 who played on both of their reunion albums, died on June 28, 2017, following a long battle with colon cancer.

In February 2022, the band released their first single in five years, "'I'll Make You See God", which was featured on the Gran Turismo 7 soundtrack. How Do You Burn? their ninth studio album, was released Sept. 9, 2022, through BMG Rights Management.

In June 2026, the band released "House of I" as the lead single for their album Soft Control. The album was released on August 21, 2026.

== Legacy ==
The influence of the Afghan Whigs has been acknowledged by a number of musicians, including Jimmy Eat World, the National, the Gaslight Anthem, the Horrible Crowes, the Hold Steady, My Chemical Romance, and Millencolin. Also, Italian indie rock band Afterhours, who extensively toured the US between 2006 and 2011, under the auspice of Greg Dulli cites the Afghan Whigs as their influence.

On June 23, 2009, an Afghan Whigs tribute album was released, featuring contributions from Mark Lanegan, Joseph Arthur, and 11 other artists influenced by the band.

== Lyrical themes ==
Since the band's formation, certain themes have been noted as developing Dulli's songwriting for the Afghan Whigs and beyond – in particular, his mixing of black humor with topics such as drug addiction, sexual deviancy, and suicidal thoughts, which often seem more personal and provocative due to their frequent embrace of the first person. Many notable the Afghan Whigs' songs are rooted in exploring power battles in romantic relationships. Gentlemen in particular has been cited for its frank and uncomfortable exploration of masculine tropes and expectations, including elements of sadomasochism and alienation. Black Love meanwhile, contains lyrics about revenge and honesty.

Dulli's songs with the Afghan Whigs also betray a fascination with and sympathy for the anti-hero, which he attributed to an influential conversation with his grandfather during childhood:

I remember as a kid watching a cowboys-and-Indians movie and I was rooting for the cowboys ... My grandfather asked me why, and I said, 'Because they're the good guys.' And my grandfather explained to me that the Indians were fighting for their land and that the cowboys were trying to steal it from them. Then he said something to me that I never forgot, which was, 'Good people aren't good all the time and bad people aren't bad all the time.' I've been exploring that gray area ever since the idea that saints can fall and sinners can transcend.

== Covers ==
The Afghan Whigs are known for their cover songs as well as their original material – in particular, freely reinterpreted songs from the soul music and R&B canon that they were exposed to in their youth. However, the Afghan Whigs have never restricted their choices in covers by genre; even from their earliest concerts they have been known to cover songs like the Rolling Stones' "Cocksucker Blues" and Neil Young's "Like A Hurricane", as well as tracks made famous by the Supremes, Prince, PJ Harvey, the Fugees, and TLC. Congregation includes a version of "The Temple" from the soundtrack of Jesus Christ Superstar, and they were also known to perform Pink Floyd's album The Wall in its entirety. The Whigs have covered a rare 1970 soul song by Marie "Queenie" Lyons, "See and Don't See", although the band continues to explore contemporary material as well, such as "Love Crimes" by current R&B iconoclast Frank Ocean, which was debuted on the band's 2012 reunion tour. The band also recorded a cover of the Lou Reed song "I Love You, Suzanne" for the album The Power of the Heart: A Tribute to Lou Reed. It was released by Light in the Attic Records on April 20, 2024. In 2025, the band released a limited edition 7" single of the songs "Fake Like" by Poliça and "Downtown" by Still Corners through Shake It Records.

== Other projects ==
- Dulli has recorded and performed with Mark Lanegan as the Gutter Twins
- Dulli continues to record and tour with his evolving collective the Twilight Singers and as a solo artist
- Dulli also has been executive producer on several works by Italian indie rock band Afterhours on top of acting as their sponsor for several US tours between 2006 and 2011.
- Curley is the bassist of Fists of Love
- McCollum is the guitarist, vocalist, and songwriter for Moon Maan
- Horrigan is the bassist for Brendan Benson
- Steve Earle is the drummer for the rock band Moonbow, featuring Dave McElfresh (also guitar and fiddle for Hank Williams III) and lead singer Matt Bischoff (also known for his role as a contestant on the television series Survivor)
- Earle is the songwriter, lead singer, and rhythm guitarist of Earle Grey. Additionally, he is the current drummer for the Santa Rosa, California, based band the Fizz Fuzz featuring Dandy Brown (Hermano, Orquesta del Desierto).
- Dulli does most of the lead vocals on the soundtrack to Backbeat, a 1994 film about the beginning days of the Beatles. Dave Grohl (Nirvana), Don Fleming (Gumball), Mike Mills (R.E.M.), Thurston Moore (Sonic Youth), and Dave Pirner (Soul Asylum) accompany Dulli as a "supergroup" playing the Beatles' early live staples (none of which are written by the Beatles).

== Members ==
Current members

- Greg Dulli – lead vocals, guitar, keyboards (1986–2001, 2006, 2011–present)
- John Curley – bass guitar (1986–2001, 2006, 2011–present)
- Rick G. Nelson – keyboards, strings, guitar, backing vocals (2011–present)
- Patrick Keeler – drums (2014–present)
- Christopher Thorn – guitar (2021–present)

Former members

- Rick McCollum – guitar (1986–2001, 2006, 2011–2012)
- Steve Earle – drums (1986–1995)
- Jon Skibic – guitar, backing vocals (2013–2021)
- Paul Buchignani – drums (1995–1996)
- Michael Horrigan – drums (1997–2001, 2006)
- Cully Symington – drums (2011–2014)
- Dave Rosser – guitar, backing vocals (2011–2017)
- Mark McGuire – guitar (2013–2014)

Touring musicians

- Doug Falsetti – percussion, backing vocals (1996–1998, 1999)
- Barbara Hunter – cello (1996)
- Harold "Happy" Chichester – keyboards, backing vocals (1996, 1999)
- Susan Marshall – backing vocals (1997–1999)
- Steve Myers – backing vocals (1997–1999)
- Josh Paxton – keyboards (1998, 1999)

== Discography ==
Studio albums

- Big Top Halloween (1988)
- Up in It (1990)
- Congregation (1992)
- Gentlemen (1993)
- Black Love (1996)
- 1965 (1998)
- Do to the Beast (2014)
- In Spades (2017)
- How Do You Burn? (2022)
- Soft Control (2026)
