= Ani DiFranco discography =

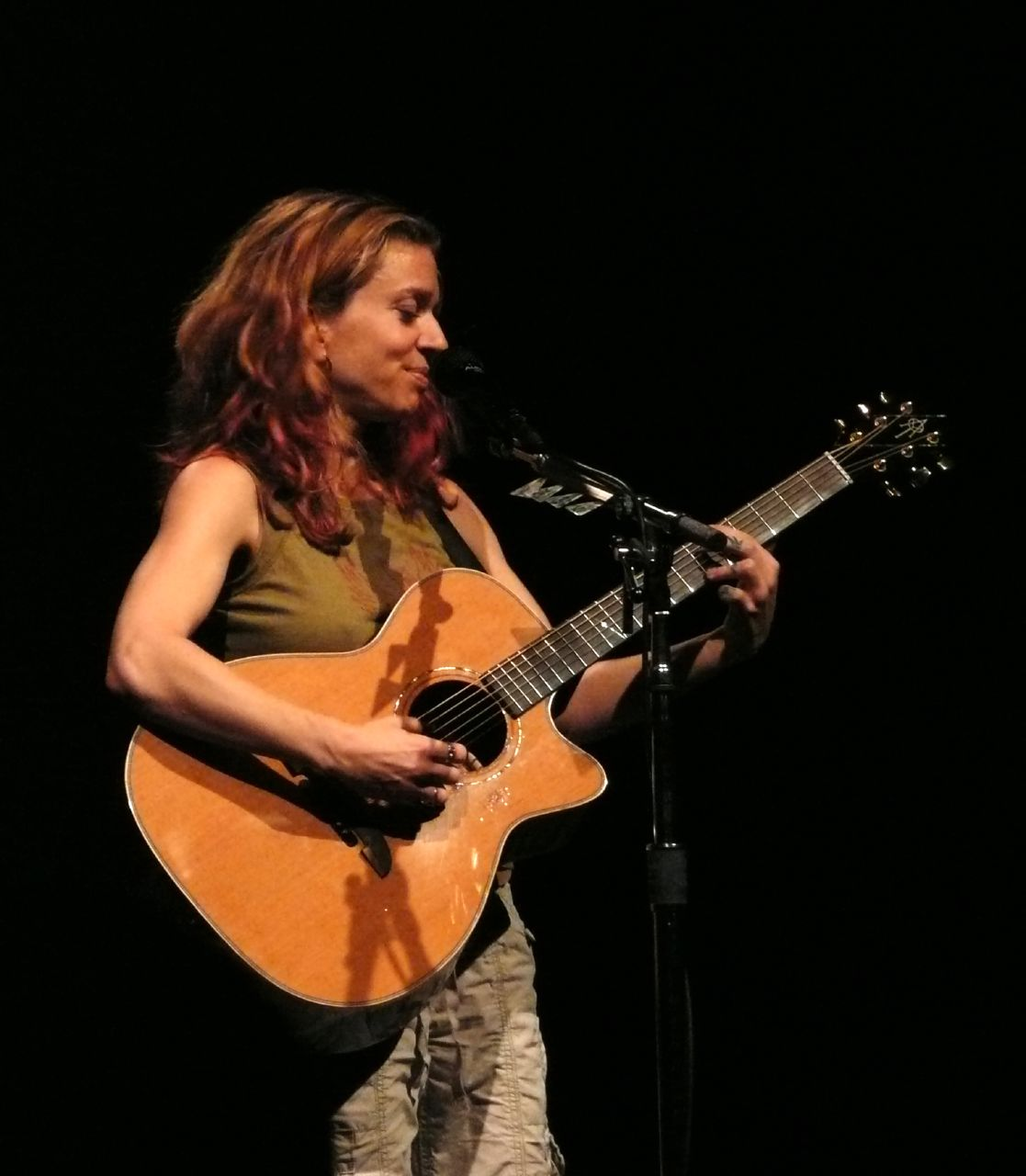
- Ani DiFranco performing at the Ancienne Belgique in 2007
- Studio albums: 23
- EPs: 3
- Live albums: 4
- Compilation albums: 3

The discography of American singer-songwriter Ani DiFranco consists of 23 studio albums (two of which are collaborations with Utah Phillips), four live albums (excluding dozens of bootlegs), three compilation albums, and three EPs.

== Albums ==
=== Studio albums ===
Year	Album	Peak chart positions					Sales
Year	Album	US	US Folk	US Indie	US Rock	AUS	Sales
1990	Ani DiFranco	—	—	—	—	—	
1991	Not So Soft	—	—	—	—	—	
1992	Imperfectly	—	—	—	—	—	
1993	Puddle Dive	—	—	—	—	—	
1994	Out of Range	—	—	—	—	—	
1995	Not a Pretty Girl	—	—	—	—	—	
1996	Dilate	87	—	—	—	—	
1998	Little Plastic Castle	22	—	—	—	57	
1999	Up Up Up Up Up Up	29	—	—	—	31	
1999	To the Teeth	76	—	12	—	—	
2001	Revelling/Reckoning	50	—	1	—	78	
2003	Evolve	30	—	1	—	61	US: 190,000
2004	Educated Guess	37	—	1	—	55	US: 121,000
2005	Knuckle Down	49	—	4	—	82	
2006	Reprieve	46	—	3	16	—	
2008	Red Letter Year	55	—	8	22	—	
2012	¿Which Side Are You On?	26	1	5	6	—	
2014	Allergic to Water	155	11	26	29	—	
2017	Binary	192	9	10	44	—	
2021	Revolutionary Love	— (Note: Revolutionary Love did not enter the US Billboard 200 but did peak at number 65 on the Top Album Sales chart.)	—	—	—	—	
2024	Unprecedented Sh!t	—	—	—	—	—	

=== with Utah Phillips ===
Year	Title
1996	The Past Didn't Go Anywhere
1999	Fellow Workers

=== Live albums ===
Year	Album	Peak chart positions		
Year	Album	US	US Indie	AUS
1994	An Acoustic Evening With	—	—	—
1994	Women in (E)motion (German release)	—	—	—
1997	Living in Clip	59	—	—
2002	So Much Shouting, So Much Laughter	32	1	78
2007	Live at Babeville (EP)	—	—	—

=== Compilations ===
Year	Album	Peak chart positions	
Year	Album	US	US Indie
1993	Like I Said: Songs 1990–91	—	—
2007	Canon	89	11
2019	No Walls Mixtape	—	—

== EPs ==
Year	Album	Peak chart positions
Year	Album	US Indie
1996	More Joy, Less Shame	—
1999	Little Plastic Remixes (limited distribution)	—
2000	Swing Set	20
2004	Trust	—
