= Reprieve (album) =

Studio album by Ani DiFranco
- Released: August 8, 2006
- Recorded: 2005–2006
- Genre: Indie rock; folk rock
- Label: Righteous Babe
- Producer: Ani DiFranco

Ani DiFranco chronology
Knuckle Down (2005)	Reprieve (2006)	Canon (2007)

Reprieve is the 15th studio album by singer-songwriter Ani DiFranco, released on August 8, 2006.

Righteous Babe Records' website notes that only DiFranco's bassist Todd Sickafoose, who had accompanied her on her recent tours, would be performing on the album. The album has a dark, mournful, mellow sound reminiscent of 1999's To the Teeth and 2004's Educated Guess and features experimental arrangements with synthesizers, electronics and tape manipulation.

As the recording of the album was briefly interrupted due to the devastation of Hurricane Katrina, the album has a heavily political and vaguely conceptual undercurrent that "paints a haunting portrait of New Orleans as the water retreats and the natives continue to rebuild their lives."

The album cover was inspired by a picture of a real tree in Nagasaki which was partially destroyed by the atomic bomb. While the city around it lay in ruin, this one tree stood, half of it destroyed, the other untouched. DiFranco also references the eucalyptus tree in the title track about the bombings of Hiroshima and Nagasaki.

While the official release date of Reprieve was August 8, the album was made available for purchase on the iTunes Music Store between June 24 and 27, 2006, possibly in error, as the album date on the site was listed as 2002.

== Critical reception ==
Professional ratings
Aggregate scores
Source	Rating
Metacritic	(74/100)
Review scores
Source	Rating
Allmusic	3.5/5 stars
Down Beat	3.5/5 stars
Entertainment Weekly	A
musicOMH	4/5 stars
NOW	3/5 stars
Paste	4/5 stars
PopMatters	(7/10)
Slant	3.5/5 stars
Spin	(6/10)
Uncut	3/5 stars

The album so far has a score of 74 out of 100 from Metacritic based on "generally favorable reviews". No Depression gave it a positive review and said of DiFranco: "Her acoustic guitar playing is mesmerizing, as usual, but her melodic fills on electric guitar and keyboards, along with her percussion work, brings some color to this group of songs." Billboard also gave the album a positive review and said it was "more languid than earlier efforts without sacrificing the urgency of [DiFranco's] patented guitar pluck-strum." E! Online gave it a B− and called it "an arresting mix of the singer's political and personal strife set to a jazzy backbeat."

The New York Times gave it an average review. It said of DiFranco: "Subtle sounds – acoustic instruments, electronic tones, environmental noises, distorted echoes – well up around her, and they open pockets of shadow around her usual pinpoint clarity. Now the atmosphere is as important as the words."

== Track listing ==
All tracks are written by Ani DiFranco.

No.	Title	Length
1.	"Hypnotized"	4:11
2.	"Subconscious"	3:32
3.	"In the Margins"	3:13
4.	"Nicotine"	4:06
5.	"Decree"	3:43
6.	"78% H_{2}O"	3:30
7.	"Millennium Theater"	3:14
8.	"Half-Assed"	3:30
9.	"Reprieve"	2:45
10.	"A Spade"	4:24
11.	"Unrequited"	4:06
12.	"Shroud"	4:48
13.	"Reprise"	1:34

== Personnel ==
- Ani DiFranco – acoustic guitar, keyboards/synths, programming, samples
- Todd Sickafoose – double bass, piano, Wurlitzer, pump organ, trumpet

Production

- Ani DiFranco – producer, engineer, artwork, design, mixing
- Mike Napolitano – engineer, mixing
- Todd Sickafoose – engineer
- Brent Lambert – mastering
- Brian Grunert – artwork, design
- Danny Clinch – photography

== Charts ==
Album

Year	Chart	Position
2006	The Billboard 200	46
2006	Top Independent Albums	3
