= Revelling/Reckoning =

Studio album by Ani DiFranco
- Released: April 10, 2001
- Genre: Indie rock; folk rock
- Length: 118:10
- Label: Righteous Babe
- Producer: Ani DiFranco

Ani DiFranco chronology
To the Teeth (1999)	Revelling/Reckoning (2001)	So Much Shouting, So Much Laughter (2002)

Professional ratings
Aggregate scores
Source	Rating
Metacritic	(78/100)
Review scores
Source	Rating
AllMusic	2/5 stars
The A.V. Club	(positive)
Entertainment Weekly	A−
Los Angeles Times	3.5/4 stars
MusicOMH	(positive)
Neumu.net	7/10 stars
Robert Christgau	B−
Rolling Stone	3.5/5 stars
Slant	2.5/5 stars
Spin	(9/10)
The Village Voice	(positive)
Wall of Sound	(70/100)

Revelling/Reckoning is the 11th studio album by singer-songwriter Ani DiFranco, released in 2001 on Righteous Babe Records. It is a double album of winding, narrative, acoustic-based songs.

The lead track of Reckoning, "Your Next Bold Move", was included on the 2002 political compilation GASCD.

== Track listing ==
All songs by Ani DiFranco.

Revelling

1. "Ain't That the Way" – 5:14
2. "O.K." – 2:51
3. "Garden of Simple" – 3:54
4. "Tamburitza Lingua" – 5:07
5. "Marrow" – 5:19
6. "Heartbreak Even" – 3:36
7. "Harvest" – 1:04
8. "Kazoointoit" – 3:51
9. "Whatall Is Nice" – 4:36
10. "What How When Where (Why Who)" – 5:58
11. "Fierce Flawless" – 5:04
12. "Rock Paper Scissors" – 6:00
13. "Beautiful Night" – 6:25

Reckoning

1. "Your Next Bold Move" – 5:47
2. "This Box Contains..." – 0:29
3. "Reckoning" – 6:02
4. "So What" – 5:03
5. "Prison Prism" – 1:34
6. "Imagine That" – 4:01
7. "Flood Waters" – 0:47
8. "Grey" – 5:22
9. "Subdivision" – 3:57
10. "Old Old Song" – 4:22
11. "Sick of Me" – 5:21
12. "Don't Nobody Know" – 1:17
13. "School Night" – 4:54
14. "That Was My Love" – 1:03
15. "Revelling" – 5:08
16. "In Here" – 4:16

== Personnel ==
- Ani DiFranco – record producer, mixer, acoustic guitar, drums, electric guitar, vocals, tambur, tongue drum, key bass, baritone guitar, bass, tenor guitar, piano, shaker, honky keys
- Shane Endsley – trumpet, shaker, voice
- Daren Hahn – drums, percussion, voice
- Jason Mercer – acoustic bass, electric bass, bowed bass, voice, kazoo
- Hans Teuber – clarinet, saxophone, bass clarinet, flute, voice
- Julie Wolf – rhodes, accordion, singing, clavinet, piano, organ, melodica, pianet,
- Scot Fisher – voice
- Maceo Parker – saxophone, singing
- Jon Hassell – trumpet
- Mark Hallman – singing
- Lloyd Maines – pedal steel
- Andrew 'Goat Boy' Gilchrist – recording, mixer

== Charts ==
Chart (2001)	Peak position
Australian Albums (ARIA)	78
US Billboard 200	50
US Top Independent Albums	1
US Top Internet Albums	2
