= Red Letter Year =

Studio album by Ani DiFranco
- Released: September 30, 2008
- Recorded: 2008
- Genres: Indie rock; folk rock
- Length: 46:58
- Label: Righteous Babe
- Producers: Ani DiFranco; Mike Napolitano

Ani DiFranco chronology
Canon (2007)	Red Letter Year (2008)	¿Which Side Are You On? (2012)

Professional ratings
Aggregate scores
Source	Rating
Metacritic	(79/100)
Review scores
Source	Rating
About.com	5/5 stars
Allmusic	4/5 stars
BBC Music	favorable
Billboard	favorable
The Boston Globe	mixed
The New York Times	favorable
Paste	(7.4/10)
The Phoenix	4/4 stars
PopMatters	(8/10)
Slant	3/5 stars

Red Letter Year is the 16th studio album by singer-songwriter Ani DiFranco, released on September 30, 2008.

Says DiFranco about the album: “When I listen to my new record, I hear a very relaxed me, which I think has been absent in a lot of my recorded canon. Now I feel like I’m in a really good place. My partner Mike Napolitano co-produced this record – my guitar and voice have never sounded better, and that’s because of him. I’ve got this great band and crew. And my baby, she teaches me how to just be in my skin, to do less and be more.”

== Track listing ==
All tracks are written by Ani DiFranco.

No.	Title	Length
1.	"Red Letter Year"	4:17
2.	"Alla This"	3:13
3.	"Present/Infant"	3:02
4.	"Smiling Underneath"	4:59
5.	"Way Tight"	3:50
6.	"Emancipated Minor"	4:30
7.	"Good Luck"	2:35
8.	"The Atom"	5:26
9.	"Round a Pole"	2:58
10.	"Landing Gear"	2:55
11.	"Star Matter"	2:48
12.	"Red Letter Year Reprise"	6:26
13.	"Good Luck (alternative version)" (iTunes bonus track)	2:31

== Personnel ==
- Ani DiFranco – vocals, acoustic and electric guitars, tenor guitar, 12 string guitar, guitar synth, ukuleles, optigan, Wurlitzer, synthesizers, percussion
- Todd Sickafoose – Fender bass, bowed basses, piano, Wurlitzer, pump organ, synthesizer
- Mike Dillon – marimba, vibraphone, percussion, tubular bells
- Allison Miller – drums, percussion
- String quartet on tracks 1, 2, 6, 7, 8 (arranged by Todd Sickafoose)
  - Jenny Scheinman – violin
  - Megan Gould – violin
  - Jessica Troy – viola
  - Marika Hughes – cello
- C. C. Adcock – electric guitar on tracks 3, 4
- Richard Comeaux – pedal steel guitar on tracks 3, 5, 10
- Animal Prufrock – piano on track 4, percussion on track 6
- Jeff Klein – vocals on track 6
- Rene Lopez – percussion on track 6
- Jon Hassell – trumpet on track 11
- The Rebirth Brass Band on tracks 1 and 12
  - Phil Frazier – tuba (band leader)
  - Derrick Shezbie – trumpet
  - Glen Andrews – trumpet
  - Stafford Agee – trombone
  - Corey Henry – trombone
  - Vincent Broussard – saxophone
  - Byron (Flee) Bernard – saxophone
  - Derrick Tabb – snare drum
  - Shorty Frazier – bass drum

=== Production ===
- Produced by Mike Napolitano and Ani DiFranco
- Recorded and mixed by Mike Napolitano at The Dugout, New Orleans, Louisiana and at Dockside, Maurice, Louisiana
- Additional engineers at Dockside – David Rashou, Corie Richie
- Rebirth Brass Band recorded by Jack Miele at Fudge, New Orleans, Louisiana
- Jon Hassell recorded by Jesse Voccia
- Rene Lopez recorded by Ken Rich
- Strings recorded by Tony Maimone at Studio G, Brooklyn, New York
- Additional recording by Ani DiFranco and Todd Sickafoose

== Charts ==
Album

Year	Chart	Position
2008	The Billboard 200	55
2008	Top Independent Albums	8
