= Evolve (Ani DiFranco album) =

Studio album by Ani DiFranco
- Released: March 11, 2003
- Genres: Indie rock; folk rock; jazz rock
- Length: 57:29
- Label: Righteous Babe
- Producer: Ani DiFranco

Ani DiFranco chronology
So Much Shouting, So Much Laughter (2002)	Evolve (2003)	Educated Guess (2004)

Professional ratings
Aggregate scores
Source	Rating
Metacritic	(63/100)
Review scores
Source	Rating
AllMusic	2.5/5 stars
The A.V. Club	(negative)
Billboard	(favorable)
Blender	4/5 stars
Chicago Tribune	(favorable)
Drowned in Sound	(8/10)
Entertainment Weekly	B+
PopMatters	(6/10)
Rolling Stone	3/5 stars
Slant	2.5/5 stars
Uncut	3/5 stars

Evolve is the twelfth studio album by singer-songwriter Ani DiFranco, released in 2003 (see 2003 in music). The album won DiFranco and Brian Grunert a Grammy Award for Best Recording Package in 2004. This album is more eclectic and stylistically venturous than DiFranco's previous works, experimenting with styles such as jazz and funk.

== Track listing ==
All songs by Ani DiFranco.

No.	Title	Length
1.	"Promised Land"	4:30
2.	"In the Way"	5:17
3.	"Icarus"	4:51
4.	"Slide"	3:50
5.	"O My My"	3:59
6.	"Evolve"	4:15
7.	"Shrug"	4:42
8.	"Phase"	3:42
9.	"Here for Now"	3:09
10.	"Second Intermission"	3:51
11.	"Serpentine"	10:26
12.	"Welcome To:"	4:57

Japanese bonus track
No.	Title	Length
12.	"Your Next Bold Move (live version from the movie "Render")"

== Personnel ==
- Ani DiFranco – guitar, piano, vocals
- Ravi Best – trumpet, vocals
- Shane Endsley – trumpet
- Daren Hahn – percussion, drums
- Todd Horton – trumpet, flugelhorn
- Jason Mercer – bass
- Hans Teuber – clarinet, flute, saxophone, vocals
- Julie Wolf – organ, piano, vocals, clavinet, melodica, Fender Rhodes

== Production ==
- record producer – Ani DiFranco
- Engineers – Andrew Gilchrist, Mark Hallman, Marty Lester
- Mixing – Ani DiFranco
- Mastering – Greg Calbi
- Design – Ani DiFranco
- Photography – Eric Frick
- Art direction – Brian Grunert

== Charts ==
Chart (2003)	Peak position
Australian Albums (ARIA Charts)	61
US Billboard 200	30
