= Women in (E)motion =

Women in (E)motion may refer to:

- Women in (E)motion (Ani DiFranco album), 1994
- Women in (E)motion (Odetta album), 2002
