= Rain Perry =

American folk-rock singer/songwriter (born 1966)

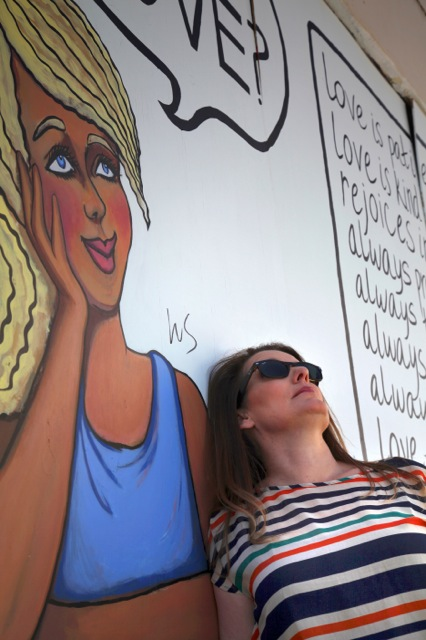

Background information
- Birth name: Rain Noel Perry
- Born: November 9, 1966 (age 58); Hollywood, California, U.S.
- Genres: Folk rock
- Occupation: Singer-songwriter
- Instrument: Vocals
- Labels: Precipitous Records

Rain Perry (born November 9, 1966) is an American folk rock singer-songwriter. She has released six albums on her own label, Precipitous Records. Her song "Beautiful Tree" was the theme song for the CW Network series Life Unexpected. "Yosemite," from her debut album Balance, won the Grand Prize (Folk Division) in the 2000 John Lennon Songwriting Contest and was recorded by Tom Russell and Nanci Griffith. She wrote and performed a theatrical memoir and audio drama Cinderblock Bookshelves: A Guide for Children of Fame-Obsessed Bohemian Nomads and is the director of the documentary The Shopkeeper, about the impact of the streaming economy on musicians, through the story of Austin music producer Mark Hallman.

In 2022 it was reported that she was developing a theatrical piece called This is Water, with a title inspired by the essay This Is Water by David Foster Wallace, about coming to terms with growing up white in America.

== Biography ==
Rain Noel Perry was born in Hollywood, California. She spent her early years in Los Angeles and Redondo Beach as a member of Bethel Tabernacle church. When her young mother died in 1974 Perry was raised by her father, writer/actor John Hazen Perry. They lived variously in Marin County, southwestern Colorado, and Los Angeles, before settling in Ojai, California, where she attended Nordhoff High School, graduating in 1984. She married attorney Bill Slaughter in 1988 and graduated with high honors from the University of California at Santa Barbara in 1995, with a degree in Interdisciplinary Studies. She and her husband live in Ojai with their two daughters.

When she was twenty-two, Perry was diagnosed with rheumatoid arthritis, which affects two million Americans, mostly women. She now works as an advocate for people with arthritis. In 2000, she produced "Agility: A Woman's Music Festival to Benefit the Arthritis Foundation," featuring Julie Christensen, Perla Batalla, Victoria Williams and Sara Hickman.

The play Cinderblock Bookshelves evolved from her 2008 album of the same name and is a memoir of her counterculture childhood, an ode to her imperfect, beloved family. The play's subtitle is "A Guide for Children of Fame-Obsessed Bohemian Nomads," and it had its world premiere in 2008 at Theater 150 in Ojai, California, under the direction of Kim Maxwell, with Sasha Heslip producing.

Rain's song "Beautiful Tree," from the album Cinderblock Bookshelves, was chosen as the theme for the CW Network television series Life Unexpected. Rain appeared as herself, alongside Sarah McLachlan and Ben Lee, in a music festival episode, a crossover with the series One Tree Hill.

== Music ==
Rain Perry has released six albums and several singles on her own label, Precipitous Records. She has been a guest performer albums by other musicians. Her last five albums were produced by Mark Hallman at the Congress House in Austin, Texas.

== Film ==
Perry's first film, a documentary about Mark Hallman of the Congress House studio called The Shopkeeper featuring Ani DiFranco, Eliza Gilkyson, Sara Hickman, Tom Russell, and Mark Andes, was released in 2016.

== Music videos ==
Perry has released several music videos, including "Keanuville," directed by Micah Van Hove, about a chance conversation with a fan she met at a Dogstar show in the 1990s.

== Awards ==
- 2000 Telluride Troubadour Competition (Telluride Bluegrass Festival) Finalist
- 2000 John Lennon Songwriting Contest – Grand Prize (Folk Division)
- 2005 ROCKRGRL Discoveries Award Grand Prize

== Discography ==
- Balance (2000)
- Wide Awake (CD Single) (2001)
- Cinderblock Bookshelves (2008)
- Internal Combustion (2011)
- Men (2013)
- Let's Be Brave (2019)
- A White Album (2022)
