= Up Up Up Up Up Up =

Studio album by Ani DiFranco
- Released: January 19, 1999
- Recorded: 1998
- Genre: Indie rock, folk rock
- Length: 61:50
- Label: Righteous Babe
- Producer: Ani DiFranco

Ani DiFranco chronology
Little Plastic Castle (1998)	Up Up Up Up Up Up (1999)	Fellow Workers (1999)

Professional ratings
Review scores
Source	Rating
AllMusic	2.5/5 stars
The A.V. Club	(favourable)
Chicago Tribune	(favourable)
Entertainment Weekly	B−
Los Angeles Times	3.5/4 stars
Melody Maker	2/5 stars
Q	4/5 stars
Robert Christgau	A−
Rolling Stone	2.5/5 stars
Slant	3.5/5 stars

Up Up Up Up Up Up is the ninth album by singer-songwriter Ani DiFranco, released in 1999 on Righteous Babe Records (see 1999 in music).

"Angry Anymore" was released to radio, but did not chart. Its promotional single featured a radio remix and an extended mix; the banjo intro to the track was sampled for a later DiFranco track, "The Arrivals Gate", released on To the Teeth.

"Jukebox" was nominated for a Grammy Award in the category of Female Rock Vocal Performance.

== Track listing ==
All songs written by Ani DiFranco.

1. "'Tis of Thee" – 4:42
2. "Virtue" – 5:07
3. "Come Away from It" – 8:22
4. "Jukebox" – 4:27
5. "Angel Food" – 5:45
6. "Angry Anymore" – 3:27
7. "Everest" – 5:15
8. "Up Up Up Up Up Up" – 3:21
9. "Know Now Then" – 4:38
10. "Trickle Down" – 3:51
11. "Hat Shaped Hat" – 12:55

== Personnel ==
- Ani DiFranco – acoustic guitar, piano, accordion, electric guitar, vocals, space phone
- Goat – drum machine
- Jason Mercer – banjo, bass, vocals, upright bass
- Andy Stochansky – drums, vocals, pocket cajun
- Julie Wolf – organ, piano, accordion, vocals, clavinet, Wurlitzer

Technical

- Ani DiFranco – record producer
- Andrew Gilchrist – engineer, mixing
- Ethan Allen – assistant engineer
- Scott Hull – mastering
- Scot Fisher – photography

== Charts ==
Chart (1999)	Peak position
Australian Albums (ARIA)	31
UK Albums (OCC)	135
UK Independent Albums (OCC)	14
US Billboard 200	29
