= Little Plastic Remixes =

EP by Ani DiFranco
- Released: 1999
- Genre: Folk rock, indie rock
- Label: Righteous Babe
- Producer: Ani DiFranco

Ani DiFranco EP chronology
More Joy, Less Shame (1996)	Little Plastic Remixes (1999)	Swing Set (2000)

Little Plastic Remixes (1999) is the second EP released by Ani DiFranco. It consists of three remixes (all by DiFranco herself) of songs from her 1998 album Little Plastic Castle and one live track from her 1993 album Puddle Dive. This EP is only available directly from the Righteous Babe Records website and was the only DiFranco record to be released on vinyl until her 2005 release Knuckle Down. It has also been released via iTunes as an iTunes Plus album which is encoded at a higher bit rate and is DRM-Free.

== Track listing ==
=== Side A ===
1. "Little Plastic Castle" (Hobby Lobby Remix)
2. "My IQ" (Live)

=== Side B ===
1. "Gravel" (Ahem Remix)
2. "Glass House" (Turkey Tamale Remix)
