= The Past Didn't Go Anywhere =

Studio album by Ani DiFranco and Utah Philips
- Released: October 15, 1996
- Recorded: March 1996
- Genre: Folk, spoken word
- Length: 57:18
- Label: Righteous Babe
- Producer: Ani DiFranco

Ani DiFranco and Utah Philips chronology
Dilate (1996)	The Past Didn't Go Anywhere (1996)	Living in Clip (1997)

Utah Phillips chronology
I've Got to Know (1991)	The Past Didn't Go Anywhere (1996)	Loafer's Glory (1997)

Professional ratings
Review scores
Source	Rating
AllMusic	3/5 stars
Robert Christgau	(1-star Honorable Mention)
Entertainment Weekly	B
The Rolling Stone Album Guide	4/5 stars

The Past Didn't Go Anywhere is an album by American folk singer Utah Phillips and American singer-songwriter Ani DiFranco, released October 15, 1996, on DiFranco's label, Righteous Babe Records.

On the album, Phillips is recorded telling stories at concerts with DiFranco setting the musical background. DiFranco provides background vocals on the first and last tracks as part of her remixing, but no songs as such.

The record was followed by Fellow Workers, a second collaboration between the two musicians, which focused on songs associated with the Industrial Workers of the World and contained singing as well as spoken-word pieces.

== Track listing ==
All tracks written by Utah Phillips and Ani DiFranco.

1. "Bridges" – 8:03
2. "Nevada City, California" – 6:41
3. "Korea" – 8:30
4. "Anarchy" – 6:27
5. "Candidacy" – 1:45
6. "Bum on the Rod" – 4:18
7. "Enormously Wealthy" – 0:43
8. "Mess With People" – 6:44
9. "Natural Resources" – 2:31
10. "Heroes" – 1:07
11. "Half a Ghost Town" – 4:22
12. "Holding On" – 6:13

== Personnel ==
- Ani DiFranco – guitar, bass, percussion, Hammond organ, vocals, thumb piano, production, engineering, sampling, artwork, design, mixing, Wurlitzer
- Utah Phillips – spoken word, vocals, guitar
- Darcie Deaville – fiddle
- Mark Hallman – engineer
- Marty Lester – engineer
- Chris Bellman – mastering
- Blair Woods – photography
