= Little Plastic Castle =

Studio album by Ani DiFranco
- Released: February 17, 1998
- Genres: Indie rock, folk rock
- Length: 61:18
- Label: Righteous Babe
- Producer: Ani DiFranco

Ani DiFranco chronology
Living in Clip (1997)	Little Plastic Castle (1998)	Up Up Up Up Up Up (1999)

Little Plastic Castle is the eighth studio album by singer-songwriter Ani DiFranco, released in 1998. It is her highest charting album on the Billboard charts, reaching number 22 on the Top 200 list.

The song "Glass House" earned DiFranco a Grammy Award nomination for Rock Female Vocalist.

Professional ratings
Review scores
Source	Rating
AllMusic	4/5 stars
The A.V. Club	(mixed)
Chicago Tribune	3/4 stars
Robert Christgau	A−
Los Angeles Times	3.5/4 stars
Rolling Stone	3.5/5 stars
Slant Magazine	3.5/5 stars
Spin	8/10
USA Today	3/4 stars

== Track listing ==
All songs by Ani DiFranco.

1. "Little Plastic Castle" – 4:32
2. "Fuel" – 4:01
3. "Gravel" – 3:32
4. "As Is" – 4:06
5. "Two Little Girls" – 4:57
6. "Deep Dish" – 3:38
7. "Loom" – 2:51
8. "Pixie" – 4:25
9. "Swan Dive" – 6:28
10. "Glass House" – 5:18
11. "Independence Day" – 3:44
12. "Pulse" – 14:15

== Personnel ==
- Ani DiFranco – acoustic guitar, guitar, percussion, concertina, drums, electric guitar, keyboards, vocals, bass pedals
- Jon Blondell – trombone
- Andrew Gilchrist – pump organ
- Jon Hassell – trumpet
- Sara Lee – bass guitar
- Jerry Marotta – drums
- Jason Mercer – electric bass, upright bass, vocals
- John Mills – baritone saxophone
- Gary Slechta – trumpet
- Andy Stochansky – drums, vocals, talking drum

=== Production ===
- Ani DiFranco – record producer, mixing, artwork
- Bob Doidge – engineer
- Mark Hallman – engineer
- Andrew Gilchrist – mixing, engineer
- Chris Bellman – mastering
- Marty Lester – digital editing
- Adam Sloan – artwork
- Asia Kepka – photography
- Albert Sanchez – photography

== Charts ==
Chart (1998)	Peak position
Australian Albums (ARIA)	57
Canada Top Albums/CDs (RPM)	44
UK Independent Albums (Official Charts)	17
US Billboard 200	22
