= Binary (Ani DiFranco album) =

Studio album by Ani DiFranco
- Released: June 9, 2017
- Recorded: 2015–2016
- Studios: The Dugout, Esplanade Studios, New Orleans, Louisiana
- Length: 49:39
- Label: Righteous Babe
- Producer: Ani DiFranco

Ani DiFranco chronology
Allergic to Water (2014)	Binary (2017)	No Walls Mixtape (2019)

Binary is the 19th studio album by singer-songwriter Ani DiFranco, released on June 9, 2017. On this album she was supported by Todd Sickafoose, the upright bass player who has toured with her since 2004. Drummer Terence Higgins, who has been touring with DiFranco since 2012, also accompanied her on most of the tracks on the album. Jenny Scheinman and Ivan Neville join the band for more than half of the record. Other musicians showing up on the album include Maceo Parker, Bon Iver's Justin Vernon, and Gail Ann Dorsey. The album was mixed by Tchad Blake (who has worked with The Black Keys, Pearl Jam, Sheryl Crow, and many others).

The first video and single, "Play God", was released on October 7, 2016. This was followed by the second video, "Deferred Gratification", which was released as a tribute to President Barack Obama on January 18, 2017. On May 9, 2017, Paste released the title track, "Binary", which was the third release. This was soon followed by a track featuring Justin Vernon called "Zizzing", which was the fourth release released by consequence.net on May 23, 2017.

== Critical reception ==
Professional ratings
Aggregate scores
Source	Rating
Metacritic	(77/100)
Review scores
Source	Rating
Allmusic	3.5/5 stars

The album has a score of 77 out of 100 from Metacritic based on "generally favorable reviews".

== Track listing ==
All tracks are written by Ani DiFranco.

No.	Title	Length
1.	"Binary"	4:22
2.	"Pacifist's Lament"	5:56
3.	"Zizzing"	5:56
4.	"Play God"	4:53
5.	"Alrighty"	3:15
6.	"Telepathic"	3:12
7.	"Even More"	4:08
8.	"Spider"	3:53
9.	"Sasquatch"	5:46
10.	"Terrifying Sight"	5:14
11.	"Deferred Gratification"	3:05

== Personnel ==
Adapted from the credits.

- Ani DiFranco – vocals; guitar; mellotron (2, 7, 11); orchestron (4, 7, 10); guitar synth (10)
- Todd Sickafoose – bass (1, 3, 5, 6, 8, 9, 10, 11); celeste (2); keyboards (2, 6, 8); shaker (2); vibraphone (3, 6); wurlitzer (5); bells (7); prepared piano (9)
- Terence Higgins – drums; congas (7); pandeiro (10)
- Ivan Neville – organ (1, 4, 10); Clavinet (1); bass (2, 4, 7); piano (2, 4, 7, 9); Rhodes (2); Wurlitzer (10)
- Jenny Scheinman – violin (3, 5, 6, 8, 10, 11); backing vocals (6)
- Maceo Parker – alto saxophone (1)
- Skerik – tenor and baritone saxophones (1); saxophones (4)
- Alonzo Bowens – clarinet (2, 7, 11)
- Bobby Campo – trumpet (2, 7, 11)
- Mark Mullins – trombone (2, 7, 11)
- Justin Vernon – backing vocals (3)
- Petah Napolitano – backing vocals (7)
- Gail Ann Dorsey – backing vocals (10)

Production

- Ani DiFranco – producer
- Tchad Blake – mixing
- Mike Napolitano – recording
- Brian Lucey – mastering
- Todd Sickafoose – horn arrangements for tracks 2, 7 and 11
- David Calderley – design at graphictherapy
- GMDThree – Ani photographs

== Charts ==
Chart (2017)	Peak position
US Billboard 200	192
US Top Rock Albums (Billboard)	44
