= Fellow Workers =

Studio album by Utah Phillips and Ani DiFranco
- Released: May 18, 1999
- Genre: Folk, indie rock
- Length: 51:28
- Label: Righteous Babe

Ani DiFranco chronology
Up Up Up Up Up Up (1999)	Fellow Workers (1999)	To the Teeth (1999)

Utah Phillips chronology
The Telling Takes Me Home (1997)	Fellow Workers (1999)	Moscow Hold (1999)

Professional ratings
Review scores
Source	Rating
AllMusic	3/5 stars
Entertainment Weekly	C+
Robert Christgau	(1-star Honorable Mention)
The Rolling Stone Album Guide	3.5/5 stars
Spin	(6/10)

Fellow Workers is an album by American folksinger Utah Phillips and American singer-songwriter Ani DiFranco. It was released May 18, 1999, on Difranco's own Righteous Babe Records. Fellow Workers is DiFranco's and Phillip's second collaboration, following The Past Didn't Go Anywhere. "Fellow workers!" is the phrase with which members of the Industrial Workers of the World traditionally begin their public addresses.

== Track listing ==
1. "Joe Hill" (instrumental) – 2:36
2. "Stupid's Song" – 2:43
3. "The Most Dangerous Woman" – 3:43
4. "Stupid's Pledge" – 0:14
5. "Direct Action" – 4:52
6. "Pie in the Sky" – 3:29
7. "Shoot or Stab Them" – 2:43
8. "Lawrence" – 3:29
9. "Bread and Roses" – 1:45
10. "Why Come?" – 6:05
11. "Unless You Are Free" – 0:22
12. "I Will Not Obey" – 2:00
13. "The Long Memory" – 5:33
14. "The Silence That Is Me" – 0:41
15. "Joe Hill" – 1:37
16. "The Saw-Playing Musician" – 4:43
17. "Dump the Bosses" – 1:14
18. "The Internationale" – 2:48

== Historical references ==
This album refers heavily to historical figures and events, often in the context of labor struggles:

- "Joe Hill" refers to Joe Hill
- "The Most Dangerous Woman" refers to Mary Harris "Mother" Jones and the West Virginia coal wars
- "Direct Action" refers to the Spokane free speech fight
- "Shoot or Stab Them" refers to Lucy Parsons and the Haymarket affair
- "Lawrence" and "Bread and Roses" refer to the 1912 Lawrence textile strike
- "Lawrence" also refers to "Smiling Joe" Ettor
- "Why Come" refers to the Everett massacre
