= Swing Set =

EP by Ani DiFranco
- Released: July 11, 2000
- Genre: Folk rock, indie rock
- Label: Righteous Babe

Ani DiFranco EP chronology
Little Plastic Remixes (1999)	Swing Set (2000)	Play God (2016)

Professional ratings
Review scores
Source	Rating
Allmusic	3/5 stars
Robert Christgau	(2-star Honorable Mention)
Rolling Stone	3/5 stars

Swing Set is an EP by Ani Difranco, released July 11, 2000 on Righteous Babe Records.

== Track listing ==
1. "Swing (Radio Set)" (Ani DiFranco) – 3:57
2. "Swing (Album Version)" (DiFranco) – 6:13
3. "To the Teeth (Shoot-Out Remix)" (DiFranco) – 6:12
4. "Do Re Me (live)" (Woody Guthrie) – 3:12
5. "When I'm Gone" (Phil Ochs) – 4:20
6. "Hurricane" (Bob Dylan, Jacques Levy) – 7:11

== Personnel ==
- Ani DiFranco – guitar, bass, keyboards, triangle, vocals, bells, sampling, megaphone, drum programming
- Daren Hahn – turntables
- Jason Mercer – bass
- Corey Parker – rapping
- Maceo Parker – saxophone
- Bo Ramsey – guitar
- David Rawlings – guitar
- Gillian Welch – backing vocals
- Julie Wolf – organ, Wurlitzer

== Production ==
- Goat Boy – engineer
- Mary Ann Southard – design
