= Allergic to Water =

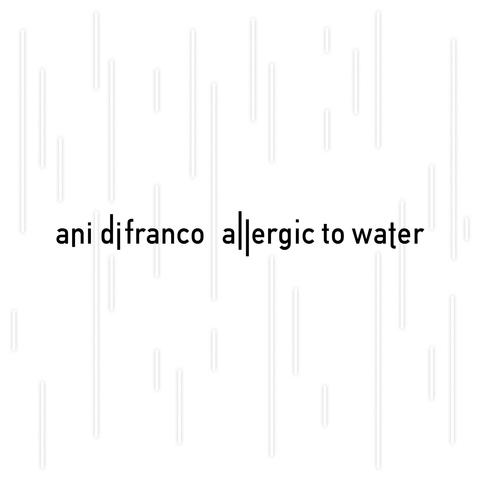

Studio album by Ani DiFranco
- Released: November 4, 2014
- Recorded: 2012–2014
- Studio: The Dugout; Esplanade Studios, New Orleans, Louisiana
- Genre: Indie rock; folk rock
- Length: 49:48
- Label: Righteous Babe
- Producer: Ani DiFranco

Ani DiFranco chronology
¿Which Side Are You On? (2012)	Allergic to Water (2014)	Binary (2017)

Allergic to Water is the 18th studio album by singer-songwriter Ani DiFranco, released on November 4, 2014.

== Critical reception ==
Professional ratings
Aggregate scores
Source	Rating
Metacritic	(71/100)
Review scores
Source	Rating
AllMusic	4/5 stars
PopMatters	4/10 stars
Spectrum Culture	3.5/5 stars
Exclaim!	6/10 stars
Wondering Sound	4/5 stars

The album has a score of 71 out of 100 from Metacritic based on "generally favorable reviews".

== Commercial performance ==
The album debuted at No. 155 on the Billboard 200.

== Track listing ==
All tracks are written by Ani DiFranco.

No.	Title	Length
1.	"Dithering"	5:04
2.	"See See See See"	3:43
3.	"Woe Be Gone"	4:01
4.	"Careless Words"	5:10
5.	"Allergic to Water"	3:43
6.	"Harder Than It Needs to Be"	4:57
7.	"Genie"	5:17
8.	"Happy All the Time"	3:54
9.	"Yeah Yr Right"	4:07
10.	"Tr'w"	2:45
11.	"Still My Heart"	3:49
12.	"Rainy Parade"	3:13

== Personnel ==
Adapted from the album credits.

- Ani DiFranco – guitar, tamburitza, wurli, harpsichord, xylophone, vocals
- Todd Sickafoose – bass, piano, Bilhorn organ, synthesizer, wurli, bells, orchestron
- Terence Higgins – drums, percussion
- Ivan Neville – wurli, clavinet, piano
- Jenny Scheinman – violins, backing vocals
- Mike Dillon – triangle
- Matt Perrine – sousaphone

Production

- Recorded by Mike Napolitano – recording
- Andy Taub – recording
- Todd Sickafoose – recording
- Ani DiFranco – producer, mixing, recording
- Brent Lambert– mastering
- Brian Grunert – art direction
- Charles Waldorf – portraits
