= Revolutionary Love (album) =

Studio album by Ani DiFranco
- Released: January 29, 2021
- Recorded: February 2020
- Studio: Overdub Lane, Durham, North Carolina, United States; Gung-Ho Studio, Eugene, Oregon, United States (strings)
- Genre: Indie folk; jazz
- Length: 56:34
- Language: English
- Label: Righteous Babe
- Producer: Ani DiFranco

Ani DiFranco chronology
Keene, NH 11-16-2019 (2020)	Revolutionary Love (2021)	Revolutionary Love: Live at Big Blue (2021)

Revolutionary Love is a 2021 studio album by American folk musician Ani DiFranco. The music continues DiFranco's commentary on politics and activism and has been met with positive reviews by critics.

== Recording and release ==
DiFranco was inspired to write the music on Revolutionary Love by the political turmoil in the United States at the time and a book written by her friend, activist Valarie Kaur. The music expresses love that DiFranco has for her homeland, in spite of differences she has with individuals politically. The recording was made in two days at the beginning of the COVID-19 pandemic and shortly after DiFranco had finished a tour. Prior to the album's release, DiFranco released "Do or Die", "Contagious", and the title track as singles.

== Reception ==
Editors at AllMusic Guide rated this album 4.5 out of five stars and labeling it one of the best albums of 2021, with critic Thom Jurek characterizing the music as "economical and smooth", with music that "challenges notions of personal and collective responsibility and elucidates the hope for inner and outer change, in illustrating exactly what it means to live and love in a ravaged, suffering world". A brief review in The New Yorker notes how DiFranco's resistance to the politics at the time are not filled with anger, but calmer emotions, calling this release an album that has "robust melodies, padded with streaks of soul and jazz that represent some of DiFranco’s fullest productions yet, prop up a challenging attempt at peace and healing". In No Depression, Jim Shahan emphasizes how DiFranco has always mixed the political and the personal in her recordings and praises her shift toward jazz-pop as "a warm, vivid accompaniment to the emotional and political heft of her words". Will Russell of Hot Press rated this album a seven out of 10, also noting the tone of the album as "more kiss on the cheek than battering ram" that has a "remarkable genre-hopping pedigree" on display in the music. Writing for musicOMH, John Murphy gave this album four out of five stars, opining that "shame not to hear her frantic finger-picking guitar in action", but "there’s still much to admire in the more modern version of DiFranco" and praising several tracks in particular but noting "there are times when it becomes rather too shapeless and meandering".

== Track listing ==
All songs written by Ani DiFranco.

1. "Revolutionary Love" – 7:10
2. "Bad Dream" – 4:54
3. "Chloroform" – 3:40
4. "Contagious" – 4:27
5. "Do or Die" – 5:20
6. "Station Identification" – 4:06
7. "Shrinking Violet" – 6:17
8. "Metropolis" – 5:33
9. "Simultaneously" – 4:18
10. "Confluence" – 4:53
11. "Crocus" – 5:56

== Personnel ==
- Ani DiFranco – vocals, guitar, production

Additional musicians

- Roosevelt Collier – pedal steel guitar on "Revolutionary Love", "Bad Dream", and "Shrinking Violet"
- Brad Cook – bass guitar on "Contagious" and "Confluence"
- Phil Cook – organ, Wurlitzer, piano
- Delgani String Quartet:
  - Eric Alterman – cello
  - Wyatt True – violin
  - Kimberlee Uwate – viola
  - Jannie Wei – violin
- Matt Douglas – saxophone, bass clarinet, flute
- Brevan Hampden – congas, bongos, triangle, shakers, percussion
- Terence Higgins – drums, percussion on "Station Identification", triangle, crazy stick on "Do or Die"
- Todd Sickafoose – bass guitar on "Revolutionary Love", "Bad Dream", "Station Identification", "Shrinking Violet", "Metropolis", and "Crocus"; keyboards and effects on "Station Identification", "Simultaneously", "Confluence", and "Crocus"; vibraphone on "Chloroform"; string arrangement
- Yan Westerlund – drums, shakers

Technical personnel

- Susan Alzner – photography
- Billy Barnett – recording of the Delgani String Quartet
- Tchad Blake – mixing
- Chris Boerner – recording
- Brent Lambert – mastering
- Carrie Smith – design

== Chart performance ==
Revolutionary Love peaked number 65 on Billboard's Top Album Sales chart.

== See also ==
- List of 2021 albums
