= Living in Clip =

Live album by Ani DiFranco
- Released: April 22, 1997
- Recorded: September 1995 – November 1996
- Genre: Indie rock, folk rock
- Length: 124:54
- Label: Righteous Babe
- Producer: Ani DiFranco

Ani DiFranco chronology
| The Past Didn't Go Anywhere (1996) | Living in Clip (1997) | Little Plastic Castle (1998) |

Professional ratings
Review scores
| Source | Rating |
|---|---|
| AllMusic | 4.5/5 stars |
| Chicago Tribune | 4/4 stars |
| Christgau's Consumer Guide | A− |
| Entertainment Weekly | A− |
| Los Angeles Times | 3/4 stars |
| Rolling Stone | 4/5 stars |
| The Rolling Stone Album Guide | 4.5/5 stars |
| Spin | 8/10 |

Living in Clip is a live album by singer-songwriter Ani DiFranco, released in 1997. The title is from a comment made by live sound engineer Larry Berger, indicating that the amplifiers weren't merely being overdriven into clipping occasionally (which is not uncommon in live sound situations); they were clipping so much that they were "living in clip". Rolling Stone named it one of "The Essential Recordings of the ‘90s".

== Track listing ==
All songs by Ani DiFranco, except where noted.

=== Disc one ===
1. "Whatever" – 1:46 (Albuquerque, NM)
2. "Wherever" – 0:06 (Santa Ana, NM)
3. "Gravel" – 4:11 (New London, CT)
4. "Willing to Fight" – 4:12 (Sacramento, CA)
5. "Shy" – 4:29 (Houston, TX)
6. "Joyful Girl" – 4:26 (Eugene, OR)
7. "Hide and Seek" – 4:34 (Hightstown, NJ)
8. "Napoleon" – 4:54 (Northampton, MA)
9. "I'm No Heroine" – 4:16 (Berkeley, CA)
10. "Amazing Grace" (John Newton) – 6:17 (Buffalo, NY)
11. "Anticipate" – 3:47 (Ithaca, NY)
12. "Tiptoe" – 0:37 (dunno)
13. "Sorry I Am" – 4:46 (New York, NY)
14. "The Slant/The Diner" – 8:22 (Atlanta, GA)
15. "32 Flavors" – 4:48 (Boulder, CO)
16. "Out of Range" – 4:27 (Portland, OR)

=== Disc two ===
1. "Untouchable Face" – 3:36 (Bloomington, Ill)
2. "Shameless" – 4:35 (Portland, OR)
3. "Distracted" – 1:08 (San Francisco, CA)
4. "Adam and Eve" – 5:36 (New York, NY)
5. "Fire Door" – 4:03 (Worcester, MA)
6. "Both Hands" – 4:52 (Buffalo, NY)
7. "Out of Habit" – 3:40 (Arcata, CA)
8. "Every State Line" – 3:55 (Atlanta, GA)
9. "Not So Soft" – 4:00 (New York, NY)
10. "Travel Tips" – 1:05 (Spokane, WA)
11. "Wrong With Me" – 1:57 (Ithaca, NY)
12. "In or Out" – 3:22 (New York, NY)
13. "We're All Gonna Blow" – 2:41 (Victoria, BC)
14. "Letter to a John" – 3:58 (San Francisco, CA)
15. "Overlap" – 11:28 (New York, NY)

== Personnel ==
- Ani DiFranco – acoustic guitar, bass, vocals
- Sara Lee – guitar, bass, vocals, bass pedals
- Doc Severinsen – conductor on "Amazing Grace" and "Both Hands"
- Buffalo Philharmonic Orchestra on "Amazing Grace" and "Both Hands"
- Andy Stochansky – harmonica, percussion, drums, vocals

=== Production ===
- Ani DiFranco – record producer, mixing, design, layout design, photography
- Andrew Gilchrist – mixing
- Chris Bellman – mastering
- James Mabry ("Amazing Grace" and "Both Hands") – arranger
- Adam Sloan – design, layout design
- Asia Kepka – photography
- Susan Alzner – photography
- Scot Fisher – photography
- Matt Hagen – photography
- Thomas Hoebbel – photography
- Liam King – photography
- Dan Koeck – photography
- Heidi Kunkel – photography
- Liz Marshall – photography
- Andy Stochansky – photography
- Asia Kepka – cover photo

== Charts ==
Album

| Year | Chart | Position |
|---|---|---|
| 1997 | The Billboard 200 | 59 |
