= So Much Shouting, So Much Laughter =

Live album by Ani DiFranco
- Released: September 10, 2002
- Recorded: September 2000 – April 2002
- Genre: Indie rock; folk rock
- Label: Righteous Babe
- Producer: Ani DiFranco

Ani DiFranco chronology
Revelling / Reckoning (2001)	So Much Shouting, So Much Laughter (2002)	Evolve (2003)

Professional ratings
Review scores
Source	Rating
Allmusic	3.5/5 stars
Robert Christgau	(1-star Honorable Mention)
The Rolling Stone Album Guide	4/5 stars

So Much Shouting, So Much Laughter is the second live album by singer-songwriter Ani DiFranco, released in 2002 (see 2002 in music).

The opening track of the second disc, "Comes a Time", is an excerpt from the famous speech by Mario Savio, given before Free Speech Movement demonstrators entered Sproul Hall to begin their sit-in on December 3, 1964. His climactic words about "the operation of the machine" have been quoted widely ever since, out of context, as the existential emblem of the FSM.

== Track listing ==
All tracks are written by Ani DiFranco.

Disc one: Stray Cats
No.	Title	Length
1.	"Swan Dive"	6:48
2.	"Letter to a John/Tamburitza Lingua"	7:50
3.	"Grey"	5:31
4.	"Cradle and All"	4:40
5.	"Whatall Is Nice"	5:39
6.	"What How When Where (Why Who)"	4:34
7.	"To the Teeth"	7:09
8.	"Revelling"	4:28
9.	"Napoleon"	6:34
10.	"Shrug"	4:36
11.	"Welcome To:"	4:47
Total length:		62:36

Disc two: Girls Singing Night
No.	Title	Length
1.	"Comes a Time"	0:22
2.	"Ain't That the Way"	4:54
3.	"Dilate"	5:55
4.	"Gratitude"	3:49
5.	"Rock Paper Scissors"	4:55
6.	"32 Flavors"	4:02
7.	"Loom/Pulse"	6:16
8.	"Not a Pretty Girl"	3:20
9.	"Self Evident"	9:10
10.	"Reckoning"	5:22
11.	"My IQ"	2:27
12.	"Jukebox"	5:56
13.	"You Had Time"	3:56
Total length:		60:24

== Personnel ==
- Ani DiFranco – guitar, vocals
- Ravi Best – trumpet
- Shane Endsley – trumpet
- Daren Hahn – drums
- Todd Horton – trumpet
- Jason Mercer – bass
- Hans Teuber – clarinet, flute, saxophone, vocals, background vocals
- Julie Wolf – keyboards, vocals

=== Production ===
- Ani DiFranco – record producer, mixing, art direction, design, illustrations
- Larry Berger – engineer supervisor, recording supervisor, photography
- Andrew Gilchrist – engineer supervisor, engineer, assistant engineer
- Greg Calbi – engineer supervisor, mastering
- Susan Alzner – photography
- Larry Berger – photography
- Scott Fisher – photography
- Eric Frick – photography
- Heidi Kunkel – photography
- Jason Mercer – photography
- Julie Wolf – photography

== Charts ==
Album

Chart (2002)	Position
Australian Albums (ARIA)	78
US Billboard 200	32
US Top Independent Albums	1
US Top Internet Albums	34
