= More Joy, Less Shame =

EP by Ani DiFranco
- Released: 1996
- Genre: Folk rock, indie rock
- Length: 29:44
- Label: Righteous Babe

Ani DiFranco EP chronology
More Joy, Less Shame (1996)	Little Plastic Remixes (1999)

Professional ratings
Review scores
Source	Rating
AllMusic	2/5 stars
NME	0/10
The Rolling Stone Album Guide	3/5 stars

More Joy, Less Shame is an EP by Ani DiFranco.

== Track listing ==
1. "Joyful Girl (Danger and Uncertainty Mix)" – 4:39
2. "Joyful Girl (Peace and Love Mix)" – 4:39
3. "Joyful Girl (Peace and Love Extended Mix)" – 6:26
4. "Joyful Girl (Live with the Buffalo Philharmonic)" – 6:03
5. "Shameless (Bathtub Mix)" – 4:52
6. "Both Hands (Live in Austin, Texas)" – 3:05

== Personnel ==
- Ani DiFranco – guitar, vocals, producer, director

== Production ==
- Rob Howard – director
- Doc Severinsen – conductor
