= Dilate (Ani DiFranco album) =

Studio album by Ani DiFranco
- Released: May 21, 1996
- Recorded: December 1995 – January 1996
- Genre: Indie rock; folk rock
- Length: 60:10
- Label: Righteous Babe
- Producer: Ani DiFranco

Ani DiFranco chronology
Not a Pretty Girl (1995)	Dilate (1996)	The Past Didn't Go Anywhere (1996)

Professional ratings
Review scores
Source	Rating
AllMusic	4/5 stars
Entertainment Weekly	B+
The Guardian	4/5 stars
Los Angeles Times	4/4 stars
NME	6/10
Rolling Stone	3/5 stars
The Rolling Stone Album Guide	4/5 stars
Slant Magazine	5/5 stars
Spin	7/10
The Village Voice	A−

Dilate is the seventh studio album by American singer-songwriter Ani DiFranco, released in 1996. Dilate is her highest-selling and most critically acclaimed record, with US sales of over 480,000 units according to SoundScan. In 2011, Slant Magazine placed the album at No. 67 on its list of "The 100 Best Albums of 1990s".

== Track listing ==
All tracks are written by Ani DiFranco except where otherwise indicated

No.	Title	Writer(s)	Length
1.	"Untouchable Face"		4:38
2.	"Outta Me, Onto You"		4:35
3.	"Superhero"		4:45
4.	"Dilate"		4:48
5.	"Amazing Grace"	John Newton	7:07
6.	"Napoleon"		6:24
7.	"Shameless"		4:51
8.	"Done Wrong"		6:31
9.	"Going Down"		4:50
10.	"Adam and Eve"		6:37
11.	"Joyful Girl"		5:04

== Personnel ==
- Ani DiFranco – synthesizer, acoustic guitar, bass, guitar, bongos, electric guitar, steel guitar, Hammond organ, vocals, thumb piano
- Michael Ramos – Hammond organ
- Andy Stochansky – drums
- David Travers-Smith – trumpet

=== Production ===
- Ani DiFranco – record producer, mixing, sampling, arranger, sequencing, artwork, design
- Robin Aubé – engineer
- Bob Doidge – engineer
- Andrew Gilchrist – engineer
- Mark Hallman – engineer
- Marty Lester – engineer
- Ed Stone – engineer
- Chris Bellman – mastering
- Adam Pause – artwork, design
- Mark Van-S – photography

== Charts ==
Chart performance for Dilate
Chart (1996)	Peak position
US Billboard 200	87
