= Skip Jones =

American singer-songwriter

- Born: Los Angeles, California, United States
- Origin: Wisconsin Northwoods and Upper Midwest United States
- Genres: Folk music
- Occupation: Singer-songwriter
- Instrument(s): Guitar, vocals
- Years active: 1978–present
- Labels: Makin' Jam, Etc.; Cabin in the Wood Recordings
- Website: skipjones.net

Skip Jones (born in Los Angeles, California and raised in Utica, New York) is an American folk musician, storyteller and educator from Wisconsin, who writes and performs songs about a wide array of topics. He often promotes clean water, social harmony, and the old family values of shared music and time tested wisdom in his music, actions, and words.

== Record labels ==
Jones founded the record labels Makin' Jam, Etc., and Cabin in the Wood Recordings. Through these labels Jones was the producer and engineer for various artists and albums, for example Utah Phillips' The Old Guy and Moscow Hold; and Larry Long's Troubadour.

== Discography ==
All references from the FolkLib Index except when noted.

- Water is Life – For All My Relations (2016)
- Hear the Whistle Blow (2011)
- Life Is Delicious (2007)
- Sacred Sites Songs, compilation (2007)
- You Are My Sunshine
- Bring Back the Joy!, compilation (2004)
- Grandpa's River (2002)
- The Journey: Chapter 2: Don't Feed The Harmonica Player (2000)
- The Journey (2000)
- The Tellin' Takes Me Home
- Skip Jones & The Children of Dubuque (1992)
- Simply Folk Sampler 2 (1990)
- Long Hard Time
- Corners of My Mind (1985)

== See also ==
- Walt Bresette
- Sparky and Rhonda Rucker
- Utah Phillips
- Guy Carawan
- Bill Staines
- Larry Long
