= Goodnight-Loving Trail (song) =

Song by Utah Phillips
- Published: 1976
- Composer: Bruce Phillips
- Lyricist: Utah Phillips

"Goodnight-Loving Trail" is a song by Utah Phillips about the cattle trail of the same name. One of the namesakes of the trail, Charles Goodnight is also credited with inventing the chuckwagon. Lyrics and liner notes are available from the author's website.

== Recordings ==
- Utah Phillips, Starlight on the Rails
- Ed Trickett, Tellin takes Me Home
- Finest Kind, Lost in a Song
- Tom Waits, Dime Store Novels Vol. 1
- Ian Tyson, Ian Tyson
- Rosalie Sorrels, Strangers In Another Country
- Chris LeDoux, Songbook of American West
- Swan Arcade, Round Again
- Charlie Daniels, Nighthawk (2016)
- Willi Carlisle, Peculiar, Missouri (2022)
- Rab Noakes, Rab Noakes (1972)

== Pop culture ==
The song is used as the opening of the h2g2 article on Roswell, New Mexico.
