= ¿Which Side Are You On? =

Studio album by Ani DiFranco
- Released: January 17, 2012
- Recorded: 2010–2011
- Genres: Indie rock; folk rock
- Length: 52:42
- Label: Righteous Babe
- Producers: Ani DiFranco; Mike Napolitano

Ani DiFranco chronology
| Red Letter Year (2008) | ¿Which Side Are You On? (2012) | Allergic To Water (2014) |

¿Which Side Are You On? is the 17th studio album by singer-songwriter Ani DiFranco, released on January 17, 2012.

The title track is a revised version of the 1931 Florence Reece song "Which Side Are You On?", which was popularized by Pete Seeger. Seeger also provides accompanying vocals and banjo on the track.

== Critical reception ==
Professional ratings
Aggregate scores
| Source | Rating |
|---|---|
| Metacritic | (69/100) |
Review scores
| Source | Rating |
| AllMusic | 3.5/5 stars |
| The A.V. Club | C |
| Consequence of Sound | 4/5 stars |
| Entertainment Weekly | C |
| Los Angeles Times | 2.5/4 stars |
| musicOMH | 4/5 stars |
| PopMatters | 6/10 stars |
| Robert Christgau | A− |
| Rolling Stone | 3.5/5 stars |
| Slant Magazine | 3/5 stars |

The album has a score of 69 out of 100 from Metacritic based on "generally favorable reviews". The Boston Globe gave it a favorable review and stated that most of it "strikes a natural balance between matters of the heart and causes close to DiFranco's heart." The Independent gave it four stars out of five and called it "Ani DiFranco's first album in three years [that] finds the self-proclaimed Righteous Babe in feisty, thoughtful form." Blurt gave the album seven stars out of ten and stated: "The melodies aren't so easily embraced; loping, ephemeral and often sounding blithely disconnected, they defy any attempt at grasping an easy hook or chorus. What's more, the loose grooves sometimes run counter to the tunes' sense of profundity."

Mojo gave it three stars out of five and said the album was "sweet and to the point." Now also gave it three stars out of five and stated that the album "works best when DiFranco points to contradictions within herself, and worst when her lyrics get preachy or black-and-white." The Daily Telegraph likewise gave it three stars and said that DiFranco's "worthier sentiments are balanced by maturing wit, self-awareness and the distinctive snap'n'slap of her funky guitar grooves." Entertainment Weekly, however, gave the album a C and said that DiFranco "gets stuck in too many clunky Big Idea statements about equality and social politics."

== Track listing ==
All tracks are written by Ani DiFranco (except track 3 by Florence Reece & Ani DiFranco).

| No. | Title | Length |
|---|---|---|
| 1. | "Life Boat" | 4:09 |
| 2. | "Unworry" | 4:17 |
| 3. | "¿Which Side Are You On?" | 6:27 |
| 4. | "Splinter" | 4:36 |
| 5. | "Promiscuity" | 3:20 |
| 6. | "Albacore" | 4:08 |
| 7. | "J" | 5:15 |
| 8. | "If Yr Not" | 2:51 |
| 9. | "Hearse" | 4:04 |
| 10. | "Mariachi" | 4:03 |
| 11. | "Amendment" | 6:27 |
| 12. | "Zoo" | 3:08 |

== Personnel ==
Adapted from the credits.

- Ani DiFranco – guitars, electric guitar, baritone guitar, tenor guitar, 12-string, percussion, synth bass, keyboards, synthesizer, harpsichord, drum, bells, voices, atmospherics
- Todd Sickafoose – bass, bowed bass, electric bass, wurlitzer piano, mellotron, piano, harpsichord, theremin, sk1, bells, pump organ
- Andy Borger – drums and percussion
- Mike Dillon – vibraphone, tympanis, tubular bells, percussion, triangle, atmospherics
- Allison Miller – drums, backing voice
- Adam Levy – distorted electric guitar, electric guitar
- CC Adcock – clean electric guitar
- Pete Seeger – banjo, backing voice
- Derrick Tabb – snare drum
- The Rivertown Kids – backing voices
- The Roots of Music Marching Crusaders – horns and drums
- Michael Juan Nunez – pedal steel guitar
- Dave Rosser – electric guitar
- Ivan Neville – keyboard bass, synthesizer, backing voice
- Cyril Neville – drums
- Anaïs Mitchell – backing voice
- Jeffrey Clemens – percussion
- Ashley Toman – harp
- Ben Ellman – tenor saxophone
- Mark Mullins – trombone
- Matt Perrine – tuba
- Mike Napolitano – drum loops
- Skerik – tenor saxophone (solo) and atmospherics

=== Production ===
- Produced by Ani DiFranco and Mike Napolitano
- Recorded by Mike Napolitano at Studio in the Country, Bogaloosa, LA
- Additional Engineering – Ben Mumphry
- Assistant Engineer – Jay Wesley at Brooklyn Bridge, Brooklyn, NY
- Additional Engineering – Andy Taub
- Assistant Engineer and Pro Tools Operator Extraordinaire – Ben Liscio
- Mixed by Mike Napolitano and Ani DiFranco
- Mastered by Brent Lambert at The Kitchen
- Art Direction – Ani DiFranco and Brian Grunert
- Design – Brian Grunert, Annie Stoll, and Maria Taczak
- Peacock Photograph – Michael Napolitano
- Ani Photographs – Patti Perret
- Funnel and Feather Photographs – Biff Henrich

== Charts ==
The album debuted at No. 82 on the Canadian Albums Chart and at No. 26 on the Billboard 200.
