= Canon (album) =

Compilation album by Ani DiFranco
- Released: September 11, 2007
- Recorded: 1989–2007
- Genres: Indie rock; folk rock
- Length: 140:52
- Label: Righteous Babe
- Producer: Ani DiFranco

Ani DiFranco chronology
Reprieve (2006)	Canon (2007)	Red Letter Year (2008)

Professional ratings
Review scores
Source	Rating
About.com	5/5 stars
Allmusic	4/5 stars
The Austin Chronicle	2.5/5 stars
Mojo	4/5 stars
musicOMH	5/5 stars
No Depression	(positive)
Paste	(favorable)
PopMatters	8/10 stars
Stylus Magazine	B

Canon is a retrospective album by Ani DiFranco which was released on September 11, 2007. It contains songs covering her career to date. DiFranco re-recorded five songs that had been previously released: "Both Hands", "Overlap", "Napoleon", "Shameless" and "Your Next Bold Move".

The album spans from DiFranco's first studio album, Ani DiFranco, released in 1990, to her then most recent, Reprieve, which was released in 2006. DiFranco personally selected the songs that appear on Canon.

== Track listing ==
All songs written by Ani DiFranco.

There is a misprint on the package. The numbers 10 and 11 are transposed in the track list on the back, though the titles are in the correct sequence.

Canon One

All tracks are written by Ani DiFranco.

No.	Title	Length
1.	"Fire Door" (from Like I Said (1993); originally on Ani DiFranco (1990))	2:58
2.	"God's Country" (from Puddle Dive (1993))	2:48
3.	"You Had Time" (from Out of Range (1994))	5:47
4.	"Buildings and Bridges" (from Out of Range (1994))	4:02
5.	"Coming Up" (from Not a Pretty Girl (1995); originally on Imperfectly (1992))	2:30
6.	"Cradle and All" (from Not a Pretty Girl (1995))	4:17
7.	"Shy" (from Not a Pretty Girl (1995))	4:46
8.	"32 Flavors" (from Not a Pretty Girl (1995))	6:07
9.	"Dilate" (from Dilate (1996))	4:46
10.	"Distracted" (from Living in Clip (1997))	1:08
11.	"Gravel" (from Living in Clip (1997); original studio recording on Little Plastic Castle (1998))	4:13
12.	"Untouchable Face" (from Living in Clip (1997); original studio recording on Dilate (1996))	3:37
13.	"Joyful Girl" (from Living in Clip (1997); original studio recording on Dilate (1996))	4:29
14.	"Little Plastic Castle" (from Little Plastic Castle (1998))	4:03
15.	"Fuel" (from Little Plastic Castle (1998))	4:00
16.	"As Is" (from Little Plastic Castle (1998))	4:06
17.	"Napoleon" (New version recorded in 2007; originally on Dilate (1996))	4:37
18.	"Shameless" (New version recorded in 2007; originally on Dilate (1996))	4:11

Canon Two

All tracks are written by Ani DiFranco.

No.	Title	Length
1.	"Hello Birmingham" (from To the Teeth (1999))	5:18
2.	"This Box Contains" (from Reckoning (2001))	0:28
3.	"Grey" (from Reckoning (2001))	5:10
4.	"Prison Prism" (from Reckoning (2001))	1:34
5.	"Marrow" (from Revelling (2001))	5:18
6.	"Here For Now" (from Evolve (2003))	3:06
7.	"Subdivision" (from Reckoning (2001))	3:45
8.	"Rain Check" (from Educated Guess (2004))	4:00
9.	"Swim" (from Educated Guess (2004))	3:05
10.	"Paradigm" (from Knuckle Down (2005))	4:33
11.	"Manhole" (from Knuckle Down (2005))	3:44
12.	"Studying Stones" (from Knuckle Down (2005))	3:50
13.	"Hypnotized" (from Reprieve (2006))	4:11
14.	"78% H_{2}O" (from Reprieve (2006))	3:30
15.	"Millennium Theater" (from Reprieve (2006))	3:16
16.	"Your Next Bold Move" (New version recorded in 2007; originally on Reckoning (2001))	4:58
17.	"Both Hands" (New version recorded in 2007; originally on Ani DiFranco (1990))	3:21
18.	"Overlap" (New version recorded in 2007; originally on Out of Range (1994))	5:20

== Personnel ==
- Ani DiFranco – acoustic, acoustic baritone, steel, electric, tenor, & bass guitars; piano; thumb piano; percussion; shakers, sounds; wurlitzer; vibes; vocals (throughout)

=== Canon One ===
- Andy Stochanksy – drums (4, 6, 7, 8, 9, 11, 12, 13, 14, 15); percussion (8, 13); vocals (11, 12)
- Sara Lee – bass (11, 12, 16); vocals (12)
- Jason Mercer – bass (14, 15)
- Todd Sickafoose – bass (17)
- Mike Dillon – vibraphone (17)
- Allison Miller – drums (17)
- Jerry Marotta – drums (16)
- Rory McLeod – harmonica (2)
- Alisdair Jones – bass (4)
- Michael Ramos – hammond organ (9)
- John Mills – baritone sax (14)
- Gary Slechta – trumpet (14)
- Jon Blondell – trombone (14)
- Joseph Arthur – background vocals (17)
- Greg Dulli – wurlitzer (17)

=== Canon Two ===
- Jason Mercer – bass (5, 6, 7); electric bass (1); bowed bass (3)
- Julie Wolf – piano (1, 3, 6, 7); organ (1, 6, 7); accordion (3, 5); rhodes (5, 6); melodica (6); clavinet (6); vocals (5, 6, 7)
- Daren Hahn – drums (1, 5, 6, 7); percussion (6); shakers (7)
- Hans Teuber – clarinets (5, 6, 7); saxophones, flute, & vocals (6)
- Shane Endsley – trumpet (5, 6); shakers (7)
- Ravi Best – trumpet & vocals (6)
- Mike Dillon – vibes (16, 18); percussion (16)
- Allison Miller – drums (17, 18); percussion (17)
- Todd Horton – trumpet & flugelhorn (6)
- Patrick Warren – chamberlin, piano, sampler (10, 11, 12)
- Jay Bellerose – drums and percussion (10, 11, 12)
- Andrew Bird – violin, glockenspiel, whistling (11, 12)
- Noe Venable – vocals (10, 11, 12)
- David Torkanowsky – keyboards & bass (16); percussion (16); wurlitzer (18)
- Tony Scherr – electric guitar (10)
- Niki Haris – vocals (10)

=== Production ===
- New versions recorded by Mike Napolitano at The Dugout in New Orleans, Louisiana
- Mixed by Mike Napolitano and Ani DiFranco
- Mastered by Bruce Barielle
- Original version compilation mastered by Bruce Barielle
- Produced by Ani DiFranco
- Art Direction by Ani DiFranco and Brian Grunert
- Design by Brian Grunert and Tim Staszak
- Album oil paintings by Thomas Kegler
- Color Cover Photo by Danny Clinch
- Black & White Cover Photo and Righteous Ani Photo by Scot Fisher
- Thanks Page Photo by Eric Frick
