= To the Teeth =

Studio album by Ani DiFranco
- Released: November 16, 1999
- Genre: Folk rock, indie rock
- Length: 71:44
- Label: Righteous Babe
- Producer: Ani DiFranco

Ani DiFranco chronology
Fellow Workers (1999)	To the Teeth (1999)	Revelling / Reckoning (2001)

Professional ratings
Review scores
Source	Rating
AllMusic	3/5 stars
Alternative Press	4/5 stars
The A.V. Club	(mixed)
Chicago Tribune	(average)
Los Angeles Times	2.5/4 stars
MusicOMH	(positive)
Q	3/5 stars
Robert Christgau	(1-star Honorable Mention)
Rolling Stone	3/5 stars
Slant	3/5 stars
Spin	(7/10)

To the Teeth is singer-songwriter Ani DiFranco's 10th studio album (excluding EPs, live albums and her collaborations with Utah Phillips), released in November 1999.

To the Teeth has a more political and self-questioning edge than many of her earlier works. It is also considerably more experimental, with "Freakshow", "Swing", "Carry You Around" and "The Arrivals Gate" branching out into genres such as blues, jazz and funk. She was also supported by Prince on the track "Providence".

It opens with the title track, an indictment of America's gun culture, and a response to the Columbine High School massacre. It also contains "Soft Shoulder", about two lovers missing their opportunity, and "Hello Birmingham", a sad, angry response to both the shooting murder of abortion doctor Barnett Slepian and the bombing of a Birmingham, Alabama, abortion clinic.

To the Teeth reached No. 76 on the Billboard Music Chart Top 200, and No. 9 on their Top Internet Albums chart.

== Track listing ==
All songs by Ani DiFranco.

1. "To the Teeth" – 7:42
2. "Soft Shoulder" – 6:04
3. "Wish I May" – 4:53
4. "Freakshow" – 5:42
5. "Going Once" – 5:33
6. "Hello Birmingham" – 5:23
7. "Back Back Back" – 4:46
8. "Swing" – 6:10
9. "Carry You Around" – 3:24
10. "Cloud Blood" – 4:51
11. "The Arrivals Gate" – 4:35
12. "Providence" – 7:18
13. "I Know This Bar" – 5:31

== Personnel ==
- Ani DiFranco – organ, acoustic guitar, banjo, bass, piano, drums, electric guitar, triangle, vocals, steel drums, bells, megaphone, tenor guitar, baritone guitar
- Daren Hahn – drums, turntables
- Kingsway Clap and Stomp Corps – clapping
- Irvin Mayfield – trumpet
- Jason Mercer – banjo, electric bass, upright bass
- Mark Mullins – trombone
- Corey Parker – rapping
- Maceo Parker – flute, saxophone
- Prince – vocals
- Kurt Swinghammer – guitar, electric guitar
- Brian Wolf – trombone, trumpet, tuba
- Julie Wolf – organ, piano, accordion, vocals, clavinet, melodica, Fender Rhodes, Wurlitzer

=== Production ===
- Ani DiFranco – producer, mixing
- Goat Boy – engineer, photography
- Ethan Allen – assistant engineer
- Greg Calbi – mastering
- Design – Cheryl Neary
- Patty Wallace – photography

== Charts ==
Chart (1999)	Peak position
UK Independent Albums (OCC)	33
US Billboard 200	76
