= Knuckle Down =

Studio album by Ani DiFranco
- Released: January 25, 2005
- Genres: Indie rock; folk rock
- Length: 57:07
- Label: Righteous Babe
- Producers: Ani DiFranco; Joe Henry

Ani DiFranco chronology
| Educated Guess (2004) | Knuckle Down (2005) | Reprieve (2006) |

Knuckle Down is the 14th studio album by singer-songwriter Ani DiFranco. It is the first album where DiFranco has collaborated with a producer; Joe Henry. The record is also her first studio album to feature a string section. It is considered among her most accessible records, and compared to the stark Educated Guess, it is more abundantly produced.

== Reception ==
Professional ratings
Aggregate scores
| Source | Rating |
|---|---|
| Metacritic | (73/100) |
Review scores
| Source | Rating |
| Allmusic | 3.5/5 stars |
| Blender | 3.5/5 stars |
| Entertainment Weekly | B |
| Filter | 84% |
| musicOMH | (positive) |
| Paste | 3/5 stars |
| PopMatters | (6/10) |
| Rolling Stone | 3/5 stars |
| Slant | 3.5/5 stars |
| Uncut | 3/5 stars |

The album so far has a score of 73 out of 100 from Metacritic based on "generally favorable reviews". Billboard gave the album a favorable review and stated: "The results are a selection of high quality that veers between brightly spirited ("Manhole," "Lag Time") and somber ("Callous")." The New York Times gave it a positive review and said that DiFranco "is still self-sufficient, but an extra pair of producer's ears gives her some new dimensions."

Other reviews are very average or mixed: Mojo gave the album three stars out of five and said it was "More honed and richly-textured than former offerings." Q, however, gave it two stars out of five and called it "Deliberately sparse and bare."

== Track listing ==
1. "Knuckle Down" – 4:34
2. "Studying Stones" – 3:53
3. "Manhole" – 3:45
4. "Sunday Morning" – 4:49
5. "Modulation" – 4:31
6. "Seeing Eye Dog" – 4:02
7. "Lag Time" – 5:13
8. "Parameters" – 5:58
9. "Callous" – 5:46
10. "Paradigm" – 4:33
11. "Minerva" – 4:55
12. "Recoil" – 5:08

== Personnel ==
- Ani DiFranco – guitar, vocals
- Patrick Warren – piano, sampling, Chamberlin
- Todd Sickafoose – string bass; Wurlitzer (track 3)
- Jay Bellerose – percussion, drums
- Andrew Bird – violin, Glockenspiel, whistling (2, 3, 7, 9, 12)
- Tony Scherr – electric guitar (4, 8, 10, 12)
- Noe Venable – vocals (2, 3, 10)
- Niki Haris – vocals (10)
- Julie Wolf – melodica (11)
- String section on tracks 2 and 7

== Production ==
- Ani DiFranco and Joe Henry – record producer
- S. "Husky" Hoskulds – engineer, mixing
- Jason Mott – assistant engineer
- Greg Calbi – mastering
- Ani DiFranco and Brian Grunert – design
- Danny Clinch – portrait photography
- Eric Frick – photography

== Charts ==
| Chart (2005) | Peak position |
|---|---|
| Australian Albums (ARIA Charts) | 82 |
| US Billboard 200 | 49 |
