= Educated Guess =

Studio album by Ani DiFranco
- Released: January 20, 2004
- Genre: Indie rock; folk rock
- Length: 48:22
- Label: Righteous Babe
- Producer: Ani DiFranco

Ani DiFranco chronology
Evolve (2003)	Educated Guess (2004)	Knuckle Down (2005)

Educated Guess is the 13th album by singer-songwriter Ani DiFranco, released January 20, 2004 (see 2004 in music). It was recorded alone at her homes in Buffalo, New York and New Orleans, Louisiana.

== Critical reception ==
Professional ratings
Aggregate scores
Source	Rating
Metacritic	(67/100)
Review scores
Source	Rating
AllMusic	3/5 stars
Blender	3.5/5 stars
E! Online	D
The Guardian	2/5 stars
Los Angeles Times	3/4 stars
MusicOMH	(positive)
PopMatters	(7/10)
Rolling Stone	2/5 stars
Slant	2/5 stars
Uncut	3/5 stars

The album so far has a score of 67 out of 100 from Metacritic based on "generally favorable reviews". Filter gave it a score of 74% and said that DiFranco "dives into a murkier, less-definable world that is part acoustic neo-soul, part spoken word and dreamier than you might imagine." The A.V. Club gave it a positive review and stated that it "benefits from DiFranco's emphasis on spare shimmer, though it also perpetuates her recent tendency to let her songs languidly drift along, for better and for worse." The New York Times also gave it a positive review and stated that "It's worth putting up with a few overbearing moments to hear someone so willing to take chances." Billboard likewise gave the album a positive review and said it was "Characterized by production rawness—for better (the immediacy of the performance) and worse (traces of off-key harmonies)."

Other reviews were average, mixed, or negative: Q gave it three stars out of five and said of DiFranco, "The jazzy stylings are a mixed blessing... [but] her fans will not be disappointed." Rolling Stone gave the album only two stars out of five and stated that the "awkward, improbable tendency goes unchecked, as does DiFranco's penchant for jarring arrangements." E! Online gave it a D and called the album "so staccato and nonlinear, a sort of free-jazz version of rock with just too much going on and little worth hearing."

The album reached No. 55 on the Australian ARIA albums chart in January 2004, and spent five weeks in the top 100.

== Track listing ==
All songs by Ani DiFranco.

1. "Platforms" – 0:17
2. "Swim" – 3:06
3. "Educated Guess" – 5:52
4. "Origami" – 2:23
5. "Bliss Like This" – 3:08
6. "The True Story of What Was" – 1:53
7. "Bodily" – 4:01
8. "You Each Time" – 4:18
9. "Animal" – 5:36
10. "Grand Canyon" – 3:31
11. "Company" – 4:06
12. "Rain Check" – 4:05
13. "Akimbo" – 1:29
14. "Bubble" – 4:30

== Personnel ==
- Ani DiFranco – acoustic guitar, electric guitar, vocals, percussion, electric bass, electric piano

== Charts ==
Chart (2004)	Peak position
Australian Albums (ARIA Charts)	55
