= Bitch and Animal =

American musical duo (1995–2004)

Bitch and Animal, a duo consisting of musicians Bitch and Animal Prufrock, was a queercore band that performed from 1995 to 2004. They became established while touring as an opening act for Ani DiFranco, and later launched their own highly successful tours.

Their first album, What's That Smell, was self-produced and featured some of their best-known songs, such as "Drag King Bar" and (on a hidden track) "Pussy Manifesto". Their next two albums were released under the record label Righteous Babe. Eternally Hard, released in 2001, was co-produced by Ani DiFranco and Wayne Schrengohst and featured "Best Cock on the Block" and "Traffic". Their last album, Sour Juice and Rhyme was produced in collaboration with June Millington of the ground-breaking 1970s all-women band Fanny. "Sour Juice and Rhyme" was nominated for the 15th GLAAD Media Awards along with Rufus Wainwright, Meshell Ndegeocello, Junior Senior, and Peaches, but lost to Rufus Wainwright.

Animal wrote a musical based on the Hothead Paisan comics by Diane DiMassa, which was performed at the Michigan Womyn's Music Festival, and is now performing solo as Animal Prufrock.

Bitch starred in John Cameron Mitchell's film "Shortbus". Bitch also collaborated with Ferron and produced her album "Boulder", which was released on Bitch's own label, Short Story Records. Bitch also has completed a documentary about Ferron, called "Thunder", which she made with Billie Jo Cavallaro.

== Discography ==
- What's That Smell (1999)
- Eternally Hard (2001)
- Sour Juice and Rhyme (2003)

Bitch solo recordings:

- Be-Sides, one take wonders and poems (2005)
- Make This Break This (2006)
- B+TEC (2008)
- Blasted! (2010)

Animal Prufrock solo recordings:

- congratulations; thank you + i'm sorry (2010)
