= Out of Range (album) =

Studio album by Ani DiFranco
- Released: July 26, 1994
- Genre: Indie rock Folk
- Length: 47:55
- Label: Righteous Babe
- Producer: Ani DiFranco; Ed Stone

Ani DiFranco chronology
Like I Said: Songs 1990-91 (1993)	Out of Range (1994)	Not a Pretty Girl (1995)

Professional ratings
Review scores
Source	Rating
AllMusic	4/5 stars
Robert Christgau	(3-star Honorable Mention)
The Rolling Stone Album Guide	3.5/5 stars
Slant	4/5 stars

Out of Range is the fifth studio album by American singer-songwriter Ani DiFranco, released in 1994.

== Track listing ==
All tracks are written by Ani DiFranco.

No.	Title	Length
1.	"Buildings and Bridges"	4:05
2.	"Out of Range (acoustic)"	3:46
3.	"Letter to a John"	3:48
4.	"Hell Yeah"	5:01
5.	"How Have You Been"	4:29
6.	"Overlap"	3:44
7.	"Face Up and Sing"	2:53
8.	"Falling Is Like This"	3:01
9.	"Out of Range (electric)"	3:25
10.	"You Had Time"	5:49
11.	"If He Tries Anything"	3:15
12.	"The Diner"	4:39
Total length:		47:55

== Personnel ==
- Ani DiFranco – acoustic guitar, percussion, piano, electric guitar, steel guitar, vocals
- Colleen Allen – saxophone
- Chris Brown – piano
- Stephen Donald – trombone
- Scot Fisher – accordion
- Alisdair Jones – bass
- Sarah McElcheran – trumpet
- Andy Stochansky – dumbek, drums, backing vocals

=== Production ===
- Ani DiFranco – producer, art director
- Ed Stone – producer, engineer
- Scot Fisher – photography
