= Not a Pretty Girl =

Studio album by Ani DiFranco
- Released: July 18, 1995
- Genres: Indie rock, folk rock
- Length: 59:11
- Label: Righteous Babe
- Producer: Ani DiFranco

Ani DiFranco chronology
| Out of Range (1994) | Not a Pretty Girl (1995) | Dilate (1996) |

Professional ratings
Review scores
| Source | Rating |
|---|---|
| AllMusic | 4.5/5 stars |
| Rolling Stone | 4/5 stars |
| The Rolling Stone Album Guide | 4/5 stars |
| Slant Magazine | 5/5 stars |
| The Village Voice | A− |

Not a Pretty Girl is the sixth studio album released by singer-songwriter Ani DiFranco on her own record label, Righteous Babe Records. It was released July 18, 1995. The album extended the folk singer's early formula of acoustic guitar and drums. On subsequent records, DiFranco would add electric guitar, horns, band members and guest musicians, but on Not a Pretty Girl she was accompanied by Andy Stochansky's percussion alone.

According to AllMusic "Light of Some Kind" is a "deeply felt portrait...in which the singer seems to be confessing to a man that she has been unfaithful to him with a woman". Released on Living in Clip, the track "Shy" earned DiFranco a 1997 Grammy Award nomination for Best Female Rock Vocal Performance.

"Shy" off the album is notable for being quoted by Matt Skiba of Alkaline Trio during live performances of the song "Ninety-Seven".

== Artwork ==
The CD case of Not a Pretty Girl is designed to be looked at "the wrong way 'round", with the spine on the right hand side rather than the left.

== Track listing ==
All tracks are written by Ani DiFranco.

| No. | Title | Length |
|---|---|---|
| 1. | "Worthy" | 4:31 |
| 2. | "Tiptoe" | 0:36 |
| 3. | "Cradle and All" | 4:18 |
| 4. | "Shy" | 4:43 |
| 5. | "Sorry I Am" | 4:45 |
| 6. | "Light of Some Kind" | 4:07 |
| 7. | "Not a Pretty Girl" | 3:55 |
| 8. | "The Million You Never Made" | 4:18 |
| 9. | "Hour Follows Hour" | 6:01 |
| 10. | "32 Flavors" | 6:07 |
| 11. | "Asking Too Much" | 2:55 |
| 12. | "This Bouquet" | 2:28 |
| 13. | "Crime for Crime" | 5:42 |
| 14. | "Coming Up" (In a pregap, you can hear DiFranco reciting the spoken word track "Tip-Toe", but misspeaking before restarting.) | 4:45 |
| Total length: | | 59:11 |

Bonus track
| No. | Title | Length |
|---|---|---|
| 15. | "32 Flavors" (live bonus track appears on some versions) | 4:47 |
| Total length: | | 63:58 |

== Personnel ==
- Ani DiFranco – guitar, bass, vocals
- Andy Stochansky – drums, percussion instrument/percussion

Production

- Ani DiFranco – record producer
- Ed Stone – engineer
