= An Acoustic Evening With =

An Acoustic Evening With...

Live album by Ani DiFranco
- Recorded: July 14, 1994
- Genre: Indie rock Folk rock
- Label: bootleg recording

Alternate cover
- Acoustic Adrenaline

An Acoustic Evening With (also known as Acoustic Adrenaline) is a live bootleg album by Ani DiFranco. It was recorded live in Renton, Washington, on July 14, 1994.

== Track listing ==
1. Both Hands – 3:26
2. Buildings and Bridges – 3:18
3. Pick Yer Nose – 3:38
4. Coming Up – 2:30
5. Willing to Fight – 4:08
6. God's Country – 2:48
7. Worthy – 4:10
8. 4 July – 5:10
9. Letter to a John – 3:48
10. Sorry I Am – 4:29
11. Cradle and All – 4:14
12. Asking Too Much – 3:25
13. My I.Q. – 1:22
14. What If No One's Watching – 3:11
15. In or Out – 3:04

== Personnel ==
- Ani DiFranco – guitar, vocals
