= Mark Hallman =

- Born: August 1, 1951 (age 74); Benton Harbor, Michigan, U.S.
- Genres: Rock, indie rock, alternative rock, Americana
- Occupations: Producer, engineer, songwriter, multi-instrumentalist
- Instruments: Keyboards, guitar, bass, drums, vocals
- Website: markhallmanmusic.com

Mark Hallman (born August 1, 1951) is an American producer, songwriter, engineer and multi-instrumentalist. He has worked with Carole King (appearing on six of her albums as a performer and producer), Ani DiFranco, and Eliza Gilkyson.

In the mid-'70s, Hallman was one of the two principal singer-songwriters for Boulder, Colorado-based rock band Navarro. Navarro put out two albums on Capitol Records, Listen in 1977 (produced by Hallman) and Straight From the Heart in 1978.

While recording at Caribou Ranch in 1977, Carole King needed a backup band. Dan Fogelberg suggested Navarro and brought her to see them perform at The Stage Stop, in Rollinsville. Hallman had been the guitarist in Fogelberg's band as well. Although Navarro had broken up by the time King called, she asked Hallman if the band would like to back her for an album on Lou Adler's Ode Record label. That album was never released but Navarro reformed for that gig and followed up with three albums recorded with her for Capitol Records.

Navarro, and Hallman in particular, found a quick ally in King. She signed the group to her label and tapped them as her session band for Simple Things, which reached No. 17 on the Billboard pop album charts. Before long, Hallman was producing King's albums and performing in her band full-time.

Hallman relocated to Austin, Texas with King in 1980. He later opened The Congress House, one of the longest continually-operating recording studios in Austin. In 1990 and 1991, Hallman won Best Producer at the Austin Music Awards, held during the South By Southwest Music Conference.

In 1995, Ani DiFranco chose Hallman's Congress House to record her album Dilate. The song "Glass House," co-engineered by Hallman off of DiFranco's 1999 CD Little Plastic Castle was nominated for a Grammy in 1998 for Best Female Rock Vocalist.

Mark Hallman toured and recorded with Iain Matthews during the nineties. He produced five albums of the British Songwriter Sean Taylor.

A feature-length film, The Shopkeeper: A Documentary about Mark Hallman & the Music Business, produced by Rain Perry, was released in 2016.

In 2024, Light Trick, an album of Mark Hallman songs was released on Tarrytown Records.

== Selected discography ==
Year	Album	Artist	Credit
2015	Restless Ones	Heartless Bastards	Engineer, Mixing
2011	Roses at the End of Time	Eliza Gilkyson	Mixing, Mastering, musician, Vocal Harmony
2008	Cinderblock Bookshelves	Rain Perry	Producer, engineer, Mixing, Vocals, Guitar, Guitar (Acoustic), Guitar (Electric), Lap Steel Guitar, Bouzouki, Mandolin, Penny Whistle, Accordion, Piano, Organ, Chamberlin, Keyboards, Synthesizer, Drums, Tambourine, Percussion, Vocals (Background), Bass, Mastering, composer
2007	Pure and Crooked/Skeleton Keys	Iain Matthews	Producer, engineer, Mixing, Audio Production, Main Personnel, Guitar (Acoustic), Acoustic 6-String Guitar, Guitar (Electric), E-Bow, Harmonica, Keyboards, Bass (Acoustic), Guitar (Bass), Drum Programming, Vocals (Background), Bass, composer
2003	Evolve	Ani DiFranco	Engineer
1998	Little Plastic Castle	Ani DiFranco	Engineer
1996	Dilate	Ani DiFranco	Engineer
1994	Time Gone By	Carole King	Producer
1977	Listen	Navarro	Vocals, Guitar, Harmonica, Piano, Piano (Electric), Organ (Hammond)
1977	Simple Things	Carole King	Vocals, Guitar, Keyboards
