= Women in (E)motion (Ani DiFranco album) =

Women In (E)motion

Live album by Ani DiFranco
- Released: December 23, 1994
- Recorded: March 7, 1994
- Genre: Indie rock Folk rock
- Label: Tradition & Moderne
- Producer: Petra Hanisch

Women In (E)motion is an Import CD release by Ani DiFranco from 1994. The set was recorded live at Schauburg in Bremen, Germany, on July 8, 1994, for the Women In (E)motion festival series on Radio Bremen and released by Tradition & Moderne Records. It has catalog #T&M105.

== Track listing ==
1. "Buildings and Bridges" – 3:19
2. "Letter to a John" – 3:49
3. "Face Up and Sing" – 2:43
4. "Out of Range" – 3:35
5. "Not So Soft" – 3:40
6. "Lullaby (Cradle and All)" – 4:15
7. "Asking Too Much" – 3:26
8. "Sorry I Am" – 4:30
9. "In or Out" – 3:04
10. "If He Tries Anything" – 3:09
11. "Blood in the Boardroom" – 3:25

== Personnel ==
- Ani DiFranco – vocals, guitars, darbuka
- Andy Stochansky – drums, djembe
