= Ani DiFranco =

American musician (born 1970)

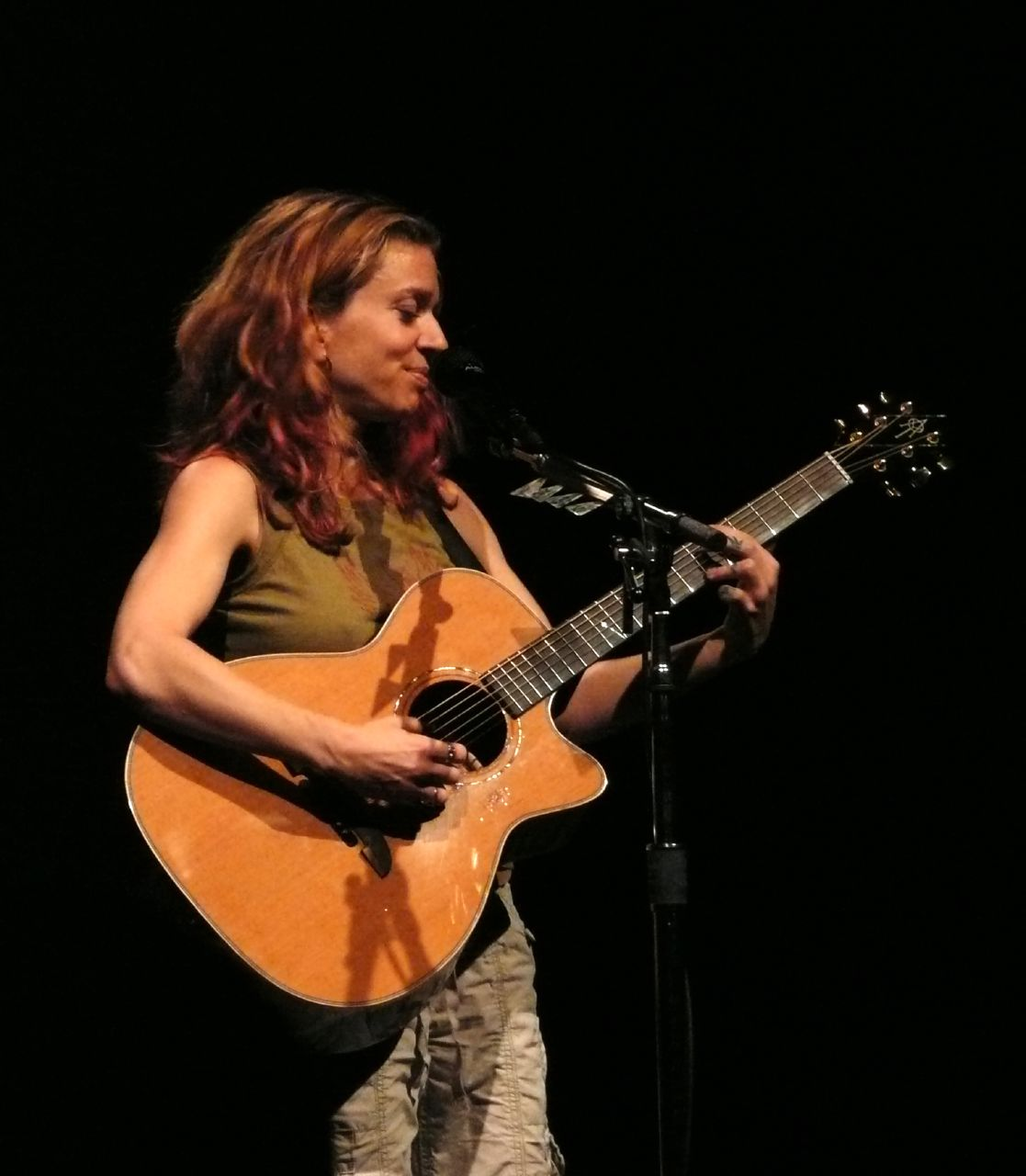
- DiFranco performing in 2007

Background information
- Born: Angela Maria DiFranco; September 23, 1970 (age 56); Buffalo, New York, US
- Genres: Folk rock; alternative rock; punk rock; indie folk
- Occupations: Musician; singer-songwriter; poet
- Instruments: Guitar; vocals
- Works: Ani DiFranco discography
- Years active: 1989–present
- Label: Righteous Babe
- Website: anidifranco.com

Angela Maria "Ani" DiFranco (/ˈɑːniː/; born September 23, 1970) is an American-Canadian singer-songwriter. She has released more than 20 albums. Her music has been classified as folk rock and alternative rock, although it has additional influences from punk, funk, hip-hop and jazz. She has released all her albums on her own record label, Righteous Babe.

DiFranco supports many social and political movements by performing benefit concerts, appearing on benefit albums and speaking at rallies. Through the Righteous Babe Foundation, she has backed grassroots cultural and political organizations supporting causes including abortion rights and LGBTQ visibility. She counts American folk singer and songwriter Pete Seeger among her mentors.

DiFranco released a memoir, No Walls and the Recurring Dream, on May 7, 2019, via Viking Books, which reached The New York Times Best Seller list.

On February 9, 2024, DiFranco made her Broadway debut in Hadestown as Persephone, reprising the role she played in the concept album of the same name.

== Early life and education ==
DiFranco was born in Buffalo, New York, on September 23, 1970, the daughter of Elizabeth (Ross) and Dante Americo DiFranco, who had met while attending the Massachusetts Institute of Technology. Her father was of Italian descent, and her mother was from Montreal. DiFranco started playing Beatles covers at local bars and busking with her guitar teacher, Michael Meldrum, at the age of nine. By 14 she was writing her own songs. She played them at bars and coffee houses throughout her teens.

DiFranco graduated from the Buffalo Academy for Visual and Performing Arts high school at 16 and began attending classes at Buffalo State College. She was living by herself, having moved out of her mother's apartment after she became an emancipated minor when she was 15.

== Career ==
DiFranco started her own record company, Righteous Babe Records, in 1989 at age 19. She released her self-titled debut album in the winter of 1990, shortly after relocating to New York City. There, she took poetry classes at The New School, where she met poet Sekou Sundiata, who was to become a friend and mentor. She toured steadily for the next 15 years, pausing only to record albums. Appearances at Canadian folk festivals and increasingly larger venues in the U.S. reflected her increasing popularity on the North American folk and roots scene. Throughout the early and mid-1990s DiFranco toured solo and also as a duo with Canadian drummer Andy Stochansky.

In September 1995, DiFranco participated in a concert at the Rock and Roll Hall of Fame in Cleveland Ohio, inaugurating the opening of the Woody Guthrie Archives in New York City. She later released a CD on Righteous Babe of the concert Til We Outnumber Em featuring artists such as DiFranco, Billy Bragg, Ramblin' Jack Elliott, Arlo Guthrie, Indigo Girls, Dave Pirner, Tim Robbins, and Bruce Springsteen, with 100 percent of proceeds going to the Woody Guthrie Foundation and Archives and the Rock and Roll Hall of Fame Museum educational department.

In 1996, bassist Sara Lee joined the touring group, whose live rapport is showcased on the 1997 album Living in Clip. DiFranco would later release Lee's solo album Make It Beautiful on Righteous Babe. In 1998, Stochansky left to pursue a solo career as a singer-songwriter. A new touring ensemble consisting of Jason Mercer on bass, Julie Wolf on keyboards, and Daren Hahn on drums, augmented at times by a horn section, accompanied DiFranco on tour between 1998 and 2002.

The 1990s were a period of heightened exposure for DiFranco, as she continued playing ever larger venues around the world and attracted international attention of the press, including cover stories in Spin, Ms., and Magnet, as well as appearances on MTV and VH1. Her playfully ironic cover of the Bacharach/David song "Wishin' and Hopin'" appeared under the opening titles of the film My Best Friend's Wedding.

She guest-starred on a 1998 episode of the Fox sitcom King of the Hill, as the voice of Peggy's feminist guitar teacher, Emily. Beginning in 1999, Righteous Babe Records began releasing albums by other artists including Sara Lee, Sekou Sundiata, Arto Lindsay, Bitch and Animal, That One Guy, Utah Phillips, Hamell on Trial, Andrew Bird, Kurt Swinghammer, Buddy Wakefield, Anaïs Mitchell and Nona Hendryx.

On September 11, 2001, DiFranco was in Manhattan and later penned the poem "Self Evident" about the experience. The poem was featured in the book It's a Free Country: Personal Freedom in America After September 11. The poem's title also became the name of DiFranco's first book of poetry, released exclusively in Italy by Minimum Fax. It was later also featured in Verses, a book of her poetry published in the U.S. by Seven Stories press. DiFranco has written and performed many spoken-word pieces throughout her career, and was showcased as a poet on the HBO series Def Poetry in 2005.

Since her 2005 release Knuckle Down (co-produced by Joe Henry) DiFranco's touring band and recordings have featured bass player Todd Sickafoose and in turns other musicians such as Allison Miller, Andy Borger, Herlin Riley, and Terence Higgins on drums and Mike Dillon on percussion and vibes. On September 11, 2007, she released the first retrospective of her career, a two-disc compilation entitled Canon, and simultaneously a retrospective collection of poetry, Verses. On September 30, 2008, she released Red Letter Year.

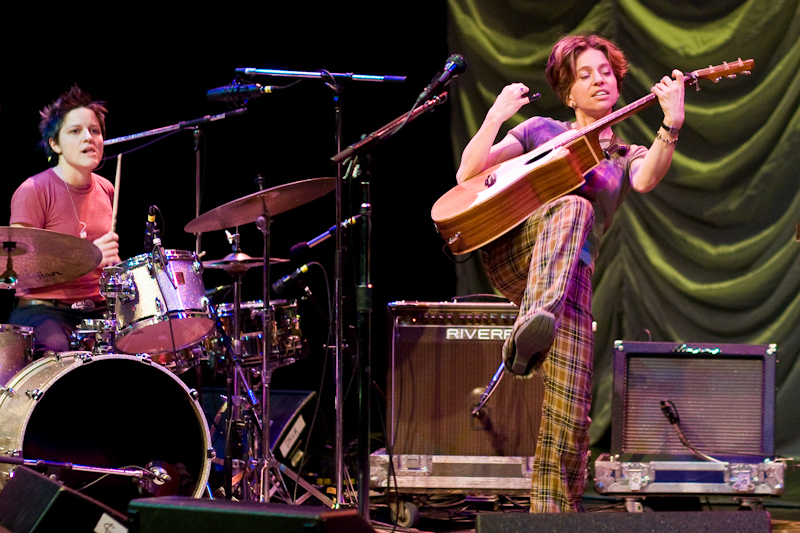
DiFranco performing in 2008

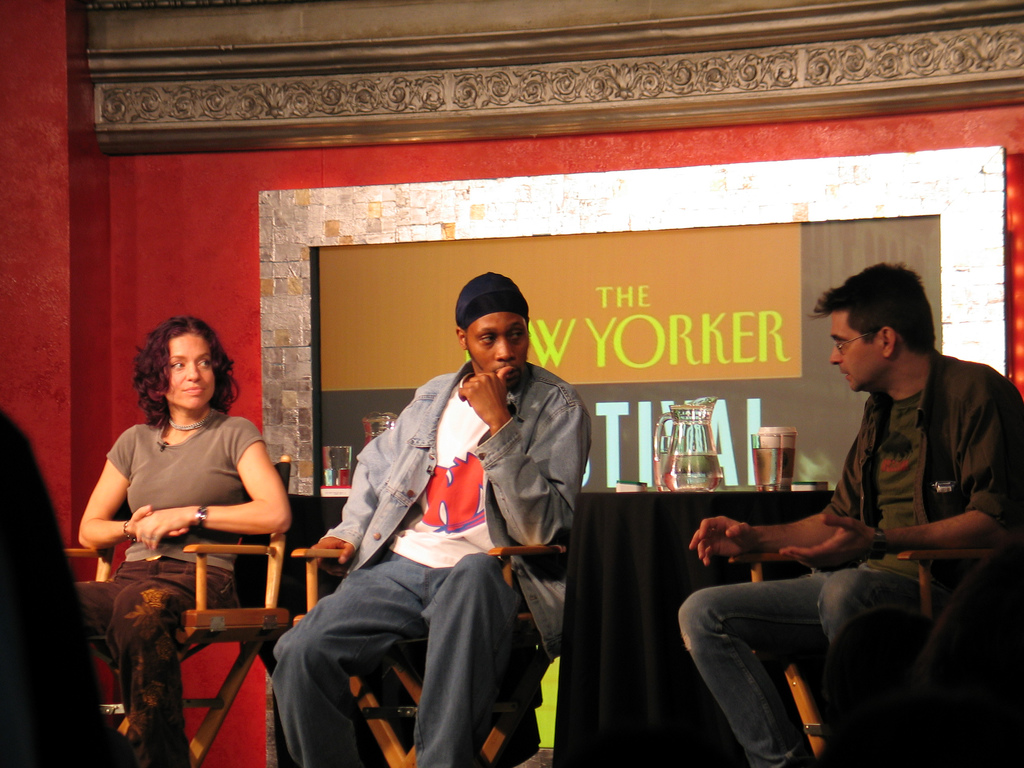
Ani DiFranco, RZA, and Steve Albini at The New Yorker Festival in September 2005.

In 2009, DiFranco appeared at Pete Seeger's 90th birthday celebration at Madison Square Garden, debuting her revamped version of the 1930s labor anthem "Which Side Are You On?" in a duet with Bruce Cockburn and also duetting with Kris Kristofferson on the folk classic "There's a Hole in the Bucket". DiFranco released an album on January 17, 2012, ¿Which Side Are You On?. It includes collaborations with Pete Seeger, Ivan Neville, Cyril Neville, Skerik, Adam Levy, Righteous Babe recording artist Anaïs Mitchell, C. C. Adcock, and a host of New Orleans–based horn players known for their work in such outfits as Galactic, Bonerama, and Rebirth Brass Band. In 2014, she released her eighteenth album, Allergic to Water. In 2017, she released her nineteenth, Binary.

On May 7, 2019, DiFranco released a memoir, No Walls and the Recurring Dream, via Viking Books. It is described as a "coming-of-age story". In 2021, she released the album Revolutionary Love, which was largely inspired by Valarie Kaur's book See No Stranger.

== Personal life ==
DiFranco came out as bisexual in her twenties, and has written songs about love and sex with women and men. She addressed the controversy about her sexuality in the song "In or Out" on the album Imperfectly (1992). However, in 2015 she told the blog GoPride.com that she was "not so queer anymore, but definitely a woman-centered woman and just a human rights-centered artist." In a 2019 interview with Jezebel, she stated that she preferred the term "queer" because "bisexual" "always sounded very medical, like something you do to a frog in 9th grade science or something", and further added that "the irony is I'm pretty fuckin' hetero, which is unfortunate for me because many of my deepest connections are with women. But, naw, I just like what's in boys' pants better." In 1998, she married her sound engineer Andrew Gilchrist in a Unitarian Universalist service in Canada. DiFranco and Gilchrist divorced in 2003.

In 1990, she wrote "Lost Woman Song", inspired by abortions she had at ages eighteen and twenty.

DiFranco's father died in the summer of 2004. In July 2005, DiFranco developed tendinitis and took a nine-month hiatus from touring. In January 2007, DiFranco gave birth to her first child, a daughter, at her Buffalo home. She married the child's father, Mike Napolitano, also her regular producer, in 2009. In an interview on September 13, 2012, DiFranco mentioned that she was pregnant with her second child. In April 2013, she gave birth to her second child, a son.

She has resided in the Bywater, New Orleans, neighborhood since 2008.

DiFranco signed the October 2023 Artists4Ceasefire open letter to Joe Biden calling for a ceasefire during the Israeli bombardment of Gaza.

She has described herself as an atheist. On the subject of religion, DiFranco has stated:

Well, I'm not a religious person myself. I'm an atheist. I think religion serves a lot of different purposes in people's lives, and I can recognize the value of that, you know, the value of ceremony, the value of community, or even just having a forum to get together and talk about ideas, about morals – that's a cool concept. But then, of course, institutional religions are so problematic.

DiFranco has spoken critically of cancel culture, saying it is "just gonna get us nowhere" and "The human family can't divorce each other". DiFranco herself has received criticism for planning a 2013 songwriting retreat at Nottoway, a former slave plantation. She cancelled the retreat three days after the news broke, writing on her website, "I needed a wake-up call and you gave it to me." In a 2019 interview, she said of her choices at the time, "I should have found the ultimate humility to put down my own hurt, and all of the misconceptions or mis-truths out there. You have to make yourself accountable. There's a greater pain that's bigger than me, and it's more important."

She wrote in her memoir that she "[sympathized] with both sides" regarding the controversial trans-exclusionary policies of the Michigan Womyn's Music Festival. In a 2019 interview, she elaborated on this statement, discussing her perception that cisgender women were being "asked again ... to move over and make room for somebody else," and later expressed that she understood the difficulty "for anybody outside of a very specific group to experience it the way that group does," saying that "maybe [women's spaces] should be a little more [inclusive]".

DiFranco is the subject of the 2024 documentary film 1-800-On-Her-Own.

== Critical reception ==
DiFranco has been a critical success for much of her career, with a career album average of 55 on Metacritic. Living in Clip, DiFranco's 1998 double live album, is the only one to achieve gold record status to date. DiFranco was praised by The Buffalo News in 2006 as "Buffalo's leading lady of rock music".

Starting in 2003, DiFranco was nominated four consecutive times for Best Recording Package at the Grammy Awards, winning in 2004 for Evolve.

== Music ==
=== Style ===
DiFranco's guitar playing is often characterized by a signature staccato style, rapid fingerpicking and many alternate tunings. She delivers many of her lines in a speaking style notable for its rhythmic variation. Her lyrics, which often include alliteration, metaphor, word play and a more or less gentle irony, have also received praise for their sophistication.

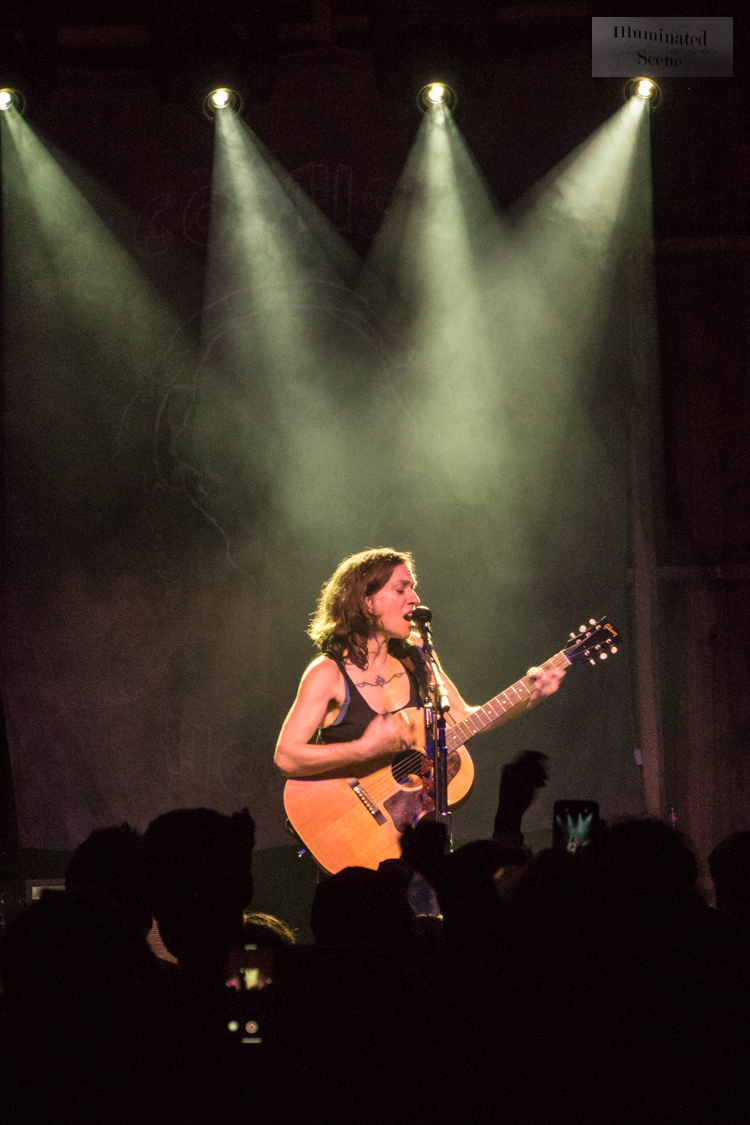
DiFranco in concert, 2019

Although DiFranco's music has been classified as both folk rock and alternative rock, she has reached across genres since her earliest albums incorporating first punk, then funk, hiphop, and jazz influences.

While primarily an acoustic guitarist she has used a variety of instruments and styles: brass instrumentation was prevalent in 1998's Little Plastic Castle; a simple walking bass in her 1997 cover of Hal David and Burt Bacharach's "Wishin' and Hopin'"; strings on the 1997 live album Living in Clip and 2004's Knuckle Down; and electronics and synthesizers in 1999's To the Teeth and 2006's Reprieve.

DiFranco has stated that "folk music is not an acoustic guitar – that's not where the heart of it is. I use the word 'folk' in reference to punk music and rap music. It's an attitude, it's an awareness of one's heritage, and it's a community. It's subcorporate music that gives voice to different communities and their struggle against authority."

=== Musical collaborations, cover versions, and samples ===
DiFranco has collaborated with a wide range of artists. In 1997, she appeared on Canadian songwriter Bruce Cockburn's Charity of Night album. In 1998, she produced fellow folksinger Dan Bern's album Fifty Eggs.

She developed a deep association with folksinger and social activist Utah Phillips throughout the mid-1990s, sharing her stage and her audience with the older musician until his death in 2008 and resulting in two collaborative albums: The Past Didn't Go Anywhere (1996) and Fellow Workers (1999, with liner notes by Howard Zinn). The Past is built around Phillips's storytelling, an important part of his art that had not previously been documented on recordings; on the album, DiFranco provides musical settings for his speaking voice. The followup, Fellow Workers, was recorded live in Daniel Lanois's Kingsway Studio in New Orleans and features Phillips fronting DiFranco's touring band for a collection of songs and stories.

Prince recorded two songs with DiFranco in 1999, "Providence" on her To the Teeth album, and "Eye Love U, But Eye Don't Trust U Anymore" on Prince's Rave Un2 the Joy Fantastic album. Funk and soul jazz musician Maceo Parker and rapper Corey Parker have both appeared on DiFranco's albums and featured appearances by her on theirs. Parker and DiFranco toured together in 1999.

She has appeared on several compilations of the songs of Pete Seeger and frequented his Hudson Clearwater Revival Festival. In 2001, she appeared on Brazilian artist Lenine's album Falange Canibal. In 2002, her rendition of Greg Brown's "The Poet Game" appeared on Going Driftless: An Artist's Tribute to Greg Brown. Also in 2002 she recorded a duet with Jackie Chan of the Irving Gordon song "Unforgettable" for a record of unlikely collaborations, When Pigs Fly: Songs You Never Thought You'd Hear.

In 2005, she appeared on Dar Williams' record My Better Self, duetting on William's cover of Pink Floyd's "Comfortably Numb". She performed with Cyndi Lauper on "Sisters of Avalon" a track from Lauper's 2005 The Body Acoustic album. In 2006, she produced Hamell on Trial's album Songs for Parents Who Enjoy Drugs. In 2008, she appeared on Todd Sickafoose's album Tiny Resisters. In 2010, she co-produced a track with Margaret Cho called "Captain Cameltoe" for the comedian's Cho Dependant album. In 2011, she appeared on Rob Wasserman's album Note of Hope, an exploration of the writings of Woody Guthrie with musical accompaniment, though the track in which she appeared, "Voice", was actually recorded 13 years earlier. Also in 2011 she duetted with Greg Dulli on the Twilight Singers record Dynamite Steps.

Other artists have covered and sampled DiFranco's work throughout the years. Her spoken word poem "Self Evident" was covered by Public Enemy founder Chuck D's group called Impossebulls. Alana Davis had some commercial success with DiFranco's song "32 Flavors". Samples from the track "Coming Up" were used by DJ Spooky in his album Live Without Dead Time, produced for AdBusters Magazine in 2003. In 2010, DiFranco played Persephone on Anaïs Mitchell's album Hadestown.

DiFranco was approached by Zoe Boekbinder to work on their Prison Music Project, an album of collaborations between incarcerated and formerly incarcerated writers and musicians on the outside. DiFranco co-produced the project with Boekbinder and co-wrote and performed "Nowhere but Barstow and Prison". The album Long Time Gone was released on Righteous Babe Records in 2020 after ten years in the making.

=== Lyrical content ===
Although much of DiFranco's material is autobiographical, it is often also strongly political. Many of her songs are concerned with contemporary social issues such as racism, sexism, sexual abuse, homophobia, reproductive rights, poverty, and war. In 2008, she donated a song to Aid Still Required's CD to assist with the restoration of the devastation done to Southeast Asia from the 2004 tsunami. The combination of personal and political is partially responsible for DiFranco's early popularity among politically active college students, particularly those of the left wing, some of whom set up fan pages on the web to document DiFranco's career as early as 1994. DiFranco's rapid rise in popularity in the mid-1990s was fueled mostly by personal contact and word of mouth rather than mainstream media.

=== Label independence ===
DiFranco cites her anti-corporate ethos for the main reason she decided to start her own label. This has allowed her a considerable degree of creative freedom over the years, including, for example, providing all instrumentals and vocals and recording the album herself at her home on an analog 8-track reel to reel, and handling much of the artwork and packaging design for her 2004 album Educated Guess. She has referenced this independence from major labels in song more than once, including "The Million You Never Made" (Not a Pretty Girl), which discusses the act of turning down a lucrative contract, "The Next Big Thing" (Not So Soft), which describes an imagined meeting with a label head-hunter who evaluates the singer based on her looks, and "Napoleon" (Dilate), which sympathizes sarcastically with an unnamed friend who did sign with a label.

The business grew organically starting in 1990 with the first cassette tape. Connections were made when women in colleges started duplicating and sharing tapes. Offers to play at colleges started coming in and her popularity grew largely by word of mouth and through women's groups or organizations. Zango and Goldenrod, two music distributors specializing in women's music, started carrying DiFranco's music. They sold music to independent music stores and women's book stores. In 1995, Righteous Babe Records signed with Koch International for DiFranco's release of Not a Pretty Girl. Her records could then be found in large and small record stores alike.

DiFranco has occasionally joined with Prince in discussing publicly the problems associated with major record companies. Righteous Babe Records employs a number of people in her hometown of Buffalo. In a 1997 open letter to Ms. magazine she expressed displeasure that what she considers a way to ensure her own artistic freedom was seen by others solely in terms of its financial success.

== Activism ==
From the earliest days of her career, DiFranco has lent her voice and her name to a broad range of social movements, performing benefit concerts, appearing on benefit albums, speaking at rallies, and offering info table space to organizations at her concerts and the virtual equivalent on her website, among other methods and actions. In 1999, she created her own not-for-profit organization; as the Buffalo News has reported, "Through the Righteous Babe Foundation, DiFranco has backed various grassroots cultural and political organizations, supporting causes ranging from abortion rights to gay visibility."

During the first Gulf War, DiFranco participated in the anti-war movement. In early 1993 she played Pete Seeger's Clearwater Folk Festival for the first time. In 1998, she was a featured performer in the Dead Man Walking benefit concert series raising money for Sister Helen Prejean's "Not in Our Name" anti-death penalty organization. DiFranco's commitment to opposing the death penalty is longstanding; she has also been a long time supporter of the Southern Center for Human Rights.

During the 2000 U.S. presidential election, she actively supported and voted for Green Party candidate Ralph Nader, though in an open letter she made clear that if she lived in a swing state, she would vote for Al Gore to prevent George W. Bush from being elected.

In 2004, DiFranco visited Burma in order to learn about the Burmese resistance movement and the country's fight for democracy. During her travels she met with then-detained resistance leader Aung San Suu Kyi. Her song "In The Way" was later featured on For the Lady, a benefit CD that donated all proceeds to the United States Campaign for Burma.

During the 2004 presidential primaries, she supported liberal, anti-war Democrat Dennis Kucinich, who appeared on stage with her during several of her concerts. After the primary season ended, and John Kerry was the clear Democratic candidate, DiFranco launched a "Vote Dammit!" tour of swing states encouraging audience members to vote. In 2005, she lobbied Congress against the proliferation of nuclear power in general and the placement of nuclear waste dumps on Indian land in particular. In 2008, she again backed Kucinich in his bid for the presidency.

In 2002, Righteous Babe Records established the "Aiding Buffalo's Children" program in conjunction with members of the local community to raise funds for Buffalo's public school system. To kick off the program, DiFranco donated "a day's pay"—the performance fee from her concert that year at Shea's Performing Arts Center— to ABC and challenged her fans to do the same. Aiding Buffalo's Children has since been folded into the Community Foundation of Greater Buffalo, contributing to a variety of charitable funds.

In 2005, when Hurricane Katrina devastated DiFranco's newly adopted home town of New Orleans, she collected donations from fans around the world through The Righteous Babe Store website for the Katrina Piano Fund, helping musicians replace instruments lost in the hurricane, raising over $47,500 for the cause.

In 2010, after the Deepwater Horizon oil spill, she performed at the "For Our Coast" benefit concert joining Marianne Faithfull, C. C. Adcock and others at the Acadiana Center for the Arts Theater in Lafayette, raising money for Gulf Aid Acadiana, and the Gulf Aid show with Lenny Kravitz, Mos Def, and others at Mardi Gras World River City in New Orleans, both shows raising money to help protect the wetlands, clean up the coast and to assist the fishermen and their families affected by the spill.

DiFranco sits on the board for The Roots of Music, founded by Rebirth Brass Band drummer Derrick Tabb. The organization provides free marching band instruction to children in the New Orleans area in addition to academic tutoring and mentoring. DiFranco joined about 500,000 people at the March for Women's Lives in DC in April 2004. As an honored guest she marched in the front row for the three-mile route, along with Margaret Cho, Janeane Garofalo, Whoopi Goldberg, Gloria Steinem and others. Later in the day, DiFranco played a few songs on the main stage in front of the Capitol, including "Your Next Bold Move".

Scot Fisher, formerly Righteous Babe label president and DiFranco's manager for many years, has been a longtime advocate of the preservation movement in Buffalo. In 1999, he and DiFranco purchased a decaying church on the verge of demolition in downtown Buffalo and began the lengthy process of restoring it. In 2006, the building opened its doors again, first briefly as "The Church" and then as "Babeville", housing two concert venues, the record label's business office, and Hallwalls Contemporary Arts Center.

DiFranco is a member of the Toronto-based charity Artists Against Racism for which she participated in a radio PSA.

On July 21, 2006, she received the Woman of Courage Award at the National Organization for Women (NOW) Conference and Young Feminist Summit in Albany, New York. DiFranco was one of the first musicians to receive the award, given each year to a woman who has set herself apart by her contributions to the feminist movement.

In 2009, DiFranco received the Woody Guthrie Award for being a voice of positive social change.

In October 2023, DiFranco signed an open letter to Joe Biden, president of the United States, of artists calling for a ceasefire of the Israeli bombardment of Gaza.

== Awards and nominations ==
Year	Nominated work	Award	Result
2017	Ani DiFranco	A2IM Lifetime Achievement Award	Won
2021	Ani DiFranco	John Lennon Real Love Award	Won
2024	Hadestown	Broadway.com Audience Award for Favorite Replacement (Female)	Nominated

== Discography ==
=== Studio albums ===
- Ani DiFranco (1990)
- Not So Soft (1991)
- Imperfectly (1992)
- Puddle Dive (1993)
- Out of Range (1994)
- Not a Pretty Girl (1995)
- Dilate (1996)
- Little Plastic Castle (1998)
- Up Up Up Up Up Up (1999)
- To the Teeth (1999)
- Revelling/Reckoning (2001)
- Evolve (2003)
- Educated Guess (2004)
- Knuckle Down (2005)
- Reprieve (2006)
- Red Letter Year (2008)
- ¿Which Side Are You On? (2012)
- Allergic to Water (2014)
- Binary (2017)
- Revolutionary Love (2021)
- Unprecedented Sh!t (2024)

==== with Utah Phillips ====
- The Past Didn't Go Anywhere (1996)
- Fellow Workers (1999)

=== Live albums ===
- 1994 – An Acoustic Evening With
- 1994 – Women in (E)motion (German Release)
- 1997 – Living in Clip
- 2002 – So Much Shouting, So Much Laughter
- 2004 – Atlanta – 10.9.03 (Official Bootleg series #1)
- 2004 – Sacramento – 10.25.03 (Official Bootleg series #1)
- 2004 – Portland – 4.7.04 (Official Bootleg series #1)
- 2005 – Boston – 11.16.03 (Official Bootleg series #1)
- 2005 – Chicago – 1.17.04 (Official Bootleg series #1)
- 2005 – Madison – 1.25.04 (Official Bootleg series #1)
- 2005 – Rome – 11.15.04 (Official Bootleg series #1)
- 2006 – Carnegie Hall – 4.6.02 (Official Bootleg series No. 1 – available in stores)
- 2007 – Boston – 11.10.06 (Official Bootleg series #1)
- 2008 – Hamburg – 10.18.07 (Official Bootleg series #1)
- 2009 – Saratoga, CA – 9.18.06 (Official Bootleg series #1)
- 2009 – Chicago – 9.22.07 (Official Bootleg series #1)
- 2010 – Live at Bull Moose Music (Limited edition)
- 2012 – Buffalo – April 22, 2012 (Official Bootleg series #2)
- 2013 – London – October 29, 2008 (Official Bootleg series #2)
- 2014 – Ridgefield, CT – November 18, 2009 (Official Bootleg series #2)
- 2014 – Harrisburg, PA – January 23, 2008 (Official Bootleg series #2)
- 2015 – New York, NY – March 30, 1995 (Official Bootleg series #2)
- 2016 – Glenside, PA – November 11, 2012 (Official Bootleg series #2)
- 2016 – Melbourne, FL – January 19, 2016 (Official Bootleg series #2)
- 2018 – Charlottesville, VA 5.12.18 (Official Bootleg series #3)
- 2019 – Woodstock, NY Jun 16, 2019 (Official Bootleg series #3)
- 2020 – Keene, NH Nov 16, 2019 (Official Bootleg series #3)
- 2021 – Revolutionary Love: Live at Big Blue

=== EPs ===
- 1996 – More Joy, Less Shame
- 1999 – Little Plastic Remixes (limited distribution)
- 2000 – Swing Set
- 2016 – Play God

=== Videos ===
- 2002 – Render: Spanning Time with Ani DiFranco
- 2004 – Trust
- 2008 – Live at Babeville

=== Compilations ===
- 1993 – Like I Said: Songs 1990–91
- 1995 – Live from Mountain Stage, Vol. 8 – "Buildings & Bridges (live)"
- 1996 – Women's Work – "Cradle and All (live)"
- 1996 – Women: Live from Mountain Stage – "Egos Like Hairdos (live)"
- 1997 – Divine Divas: A World of Women's Voices – "Amazing Grace"
- 1998 – Live at World Café Vol. 6 – "Buildings & Bridges (live)"
- 1998 – Modern Day Storytellers – "Buildings & Bridges"
- 1998 – Rare on Air Vol. 4 (KCRW) – "Gravel (live)"
- 1998 – Where Have All the Flowers Gone: Songs of Pete Seeger – "My Name is Lisa Kalvelage"
- 1998 – Women of Spirit – "Done Wrong"
- 1999 – Respect: A Century of Women in Music – "32 Flavors"
- 2000 – Badlands: A Tribute to Bruce Springsteen's Nebraska – "Used Cars"
- 2000 – Best of Hard Rock Café Live – "Little Plastic Castle (live)"
- 2000 – 'Til We Outnumber 'Em – Performed "Do Re Mi" solo and "Ramblin' Round" with Indigo Girls; producer
- 2001 – Live @ The World Café Vol. 10 – "32 Flavors"
- 2001 – Best of Sessions at West 54th – "32 Flavors"
- 2002 – Gascd – "Your Next Bold Move"
- 2002 – Going Driftless: An Artist Tribute to Greg Brown – "The Poet Game"
- 2002 – When Pigs Fly: Songs You Never Thought You'd Hear – "Unforgettable" w/ Jackie Chan
- 2003 – Peace Not War – "Self Evident"
- 2004 – Peace Not War Vol. 2 – "Animal"
- 2004 – For the Lady – "In the Way"
- 2005 – Bonnaroo Music Festival 2004 (CD & DVD) – "Evolve (live)"
- 2006 – Music Is Hope – "Napoleon (remix)"
- 2006 – Dead Man Walking: Music from and Inspired by the Motion Picture – "Crime for Crime", "Fuel", "Up Up Up Up Up Up"
- 2007 – Canon
- 2007 – Sowing the Seed: The 10th Anniversary Appleseed Recordings – "Waist Deep in the Big Muddy"
- 2007 – Cool as Folk: Cambridge Folk Festival – "Cradle and All (live)"
- 2009 – Singing Through the Hard Times: A Utah Phillips Celebration – "The International"
- 2011 – Note of Hope: A Celebration of Woody Guthrie – "Voice"
- 2011 – Every Mother Counts – "Present/Infant" (Remix)
- 2012 – Occupy This Album – "Which Side Are You On? (a capella)"
- 2019 – No Walls Mixtape
- 2020 – Prison Music Project: Long Time Gone – "Nowhere but Barstow and Prison"

=== As producer ===
- 1998 – Dan Bern – Fifty Eggs
- 2010 – Margaret Cho – Cho Dependent – co-producer on "Captain Cameltoe"
- 2017 – Peter Mulvey – Are You Listening?
- 2020 – Prison Music Project: Long Time Gone

=== Other contributions ===
- 1989 – Demo tape (unreleased)
- 2001 – John Gorka – The Company You Keep – backing vocals on "Oh Abraham"
- 2006 – Jason Karaban – Doomed to Make Choices
- 2006 – Twilight Singers – Powder Burns – Featured on "Bonnie Brae", "Candy Cane Crawl", and "Powder Burns"
- 2008 – Dr. John – The City That Care Forgot – Contributed backing vocals to the title track.
- 2009 – Jason Karaban – Sobriety Kills
- 2010 – Anaïs Mitchell – Hadestown
- 2010 – Preservation Hall Jazz Band – Preservation: An Album to Benefit Preservation Hall & The Preservation Hall Music Outreach Program – Featured on "Freight Train"
- 2011 – Twilight Singers – Dynamite Steps – Featured on "Blackbird and the Fox"
- 2016 – Ryan Harvey – Featured on "Old Man Trump"
- 2019 – Rising Appalachia – Leylines – Featured on "Speak Out"
- 2021 – Pieta Brown – Featured on "We Are Not Machines"

== Publications ==
=== Poetry ===
- 2004: Self-evident: poesie e disegni
- 2007: Verses

=== Other books ===
- DiFranco, Ani; Coyle Rosen, Lauren (March 3, 2026). The Spirit of Ani: Reflections on Spirituality, Feminism, Music, and Freedom. Brooklyn, New York: Akashic Books. ISBN 9781636142784. OCLC 1521159685.
