= Righteous Babe Records =

American independent record label

- The official logo for Righteous Babe Records.
- Founded: 1990
- Founder: Ani DiFranco; Scot Fisher
- Distributor: Symphonic Distribution
- Country of origin: U.S.
- Official website: www.righteousbabe.com

Righteous Babe Records is an American independent record label that was created by folk singer Ani DiFranco in 1990 to release her own songs in lieu of being beholden to a mainstream record company.

== History ==
Righteous Babe Records was originally called Righteous Records; however, DiFranco then discovered a gospel music label already had that name, and to differentiate her company, added the "Babe".

Located in DiFranco's hometown of Buffalo, New York, the business grew organically, starting in 1990 with her first cassette tape. DiFranco sold the tapes out of the back of her car and at shows on tour, then sold them on consignment in local stores. Teaming up with her longtime business partner Scot Fisher, they were able to self-distribute her albums directly to over 100 indie accounts. DiFranco cites her anti-corporate ethos for the DIY ethics at Righteous Babe and not wanting to buy into the major label system.

Having a large women's music following she was able to make connections at Zango and Goldenrod, two music distributors specializing in women's music who started selling her albums to women's book stores and other small music shops. After the independent success of her sixth album Out of Range, Righteous Babe Records signed a distribution deal with independent distributor Koch International (later eOne) for DiFranco's highly anticipated Not a Pretty Girl release in 1995. Her records could then be found in large and small record stores alike and the Righteous Babe staff quickly grew to fourteen people.

DiFranco and Fisher stress the importance of community to their business such as working with local printers whenever possible, hiring friends and like minded people.

Righteous Babe expanded in the late 1990s to release albums for non-mainstream artists and in 2001 Righteous Babe opened a European office called Righteous Babe LTD.

Alternative Press described the label's focus as "the freedom of being able to create for oneself" and the roster as "a lineup of artists who are uniquely themselves."

== Babeville ==
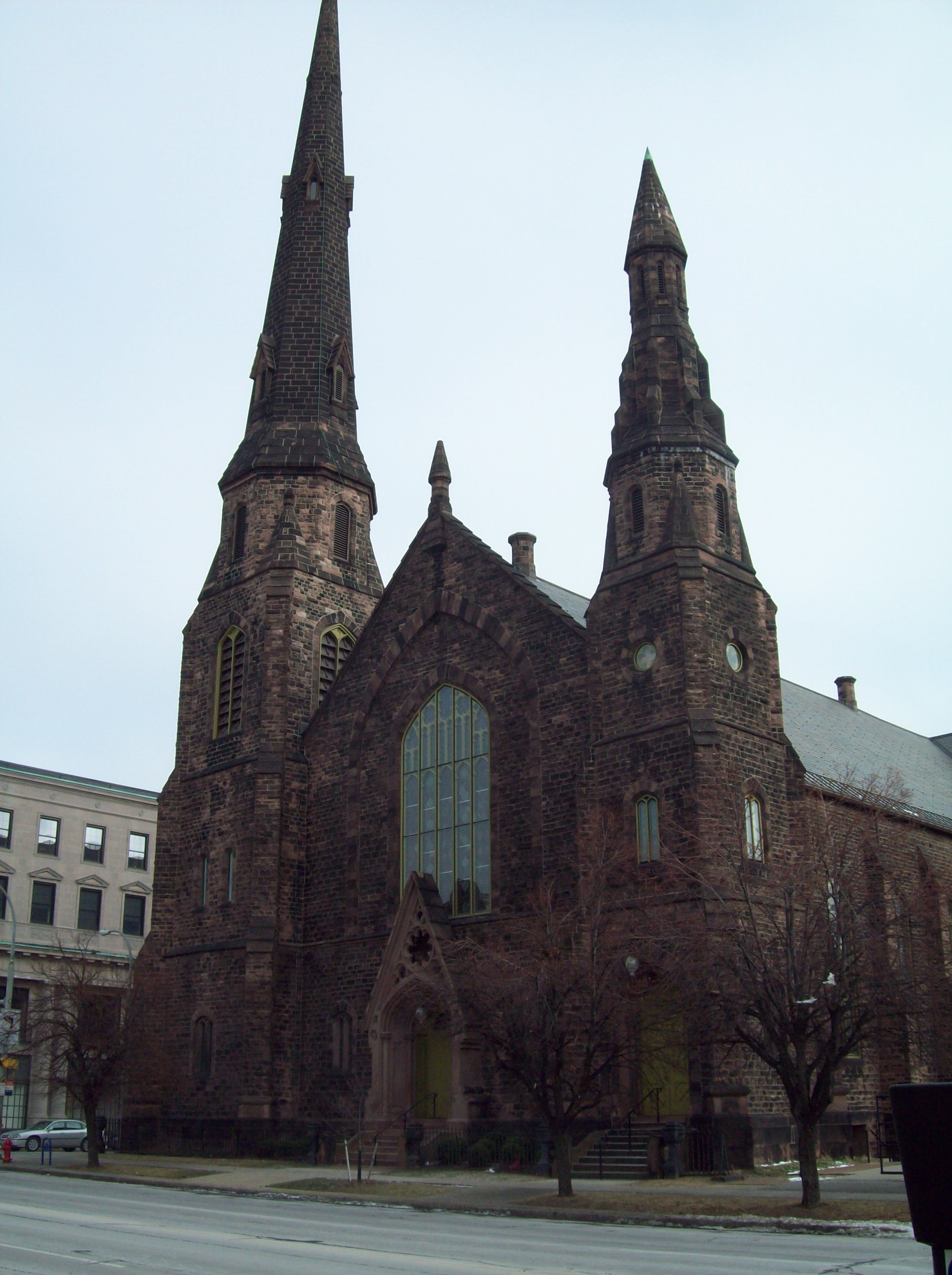
Home of Righteous Babe Records, December 2009

In 1995, an abandoned 19th century historical landmark, the Asbury Delaware United Methodist Church was scheduled to be demolished by the City of Buffalo. The church had been built in 1876 but became derelict with no upkeep. In 1999, Righteous Babe Records offered to buy the building from the city. Restoration efforts began in 2000, and by 2006 it had been converted into an entertainment venue. Originally referred to as "The Church", the name was affectionately changed to "Babeville." It has a 1,200-seat concert hall and is the home of the label.

== Artists ==
=== Extant ===
- Ani DiFranco
- Gracie and Rachel
- Holly Miranda
- Jess Nolan
- Jocelyn Mackenzie
- Joy Clark
- Kristen Ford
- Lilli Lewis
- Liv Slingerland
- Peter Mulvey
- Pieta Brown
- Prison Music Project
- Resistance Revival Chorus
- Robinson & Rohe
- Wryn
- Zoe Boekbinder
- Ruth Theodore
- Dar Williams
- Sweet Petunia

=== Alumni ===
- Andrew Bird
- Animal Prufrock
- Bitch and Animal
- Drums and Tuba
- Hamell on Trial
- Nona Hendryx
- Jennifer Knapp
- Sara Lee
- Arto Lindsay
- Anaïs Mitchell
- Utah Phillips
- Toshi Reagon
- Sekou Sundiata
- Kurt Swinghammer
- That 1 Guy
- Buddy Wakefield

== See also ==
- Righteous Babe Records artists
- Righteous Babe Records albums
- List of record labels
