= Campfire Songs (10,000 Maniacs album) =

Campfire Songs: The Popular, Obscure and Unknown Recordings of 10,000 Maniacs

Compilation album by 10,000 Maniacs
- Released: January 27, 2004
- Recorded: 1982–1993
- Genre: Pop rock; alternative rock; college rock; folk-pop
- Length: 114:23
- Label: Elektra
- Producer: 10,000 Maniacs, Bill Waldman, Joe Boyd, Peter Asher, Paul Fox, Gary Smith, Lenny Kaye

10,000 Maniacs chronology
The Earth Pressed Flat (1999)	Campfire Songs: The Popular, Obscure and Unknown Recordings of 10,000 Maniacs (2004)	Live Twenty-Five (2005)

Professional ratings
Review scores
Source	Rating
AllMusic	4/5 stars
Entertainment Weekly	B+
Q	link
The Rolling Stone Album Guide	4/5 stars

Campfire Songs: The Popular, Obscure and Unknown Recordings of 10,000 Maniacs is a compilation album by American alternative rock band 10,000 Maniacs, released in 2004. It includes their biggest hits, B-sides and unreleased recordings from the Natalie Merchant era. Despite the album's title, the collection does not include "A Campfire Song" from In My Tribe (1987).

== Track listing ==
Disc one – The Most Popular Recordings
No.	Title	Writer(s)	Original release	Length
1.	"Planned Obsolescence"	Natalie Merchant, Dennis Drew	Human Conflict Number Five	4:29
2.	"My Mother the War"	John Lombardo, Michael Walsh, Merchant	Secrets of the I Ching	3:32
3.	"Tension"	Merchant, Lombardo	Secrets of the I Ching	3:31
4.	"Scorpio Rising"	Robert Buck, Merchant, Lombardo	The Wishing Chair	3:14
5.	"Like the Weather"	Merchant	In My Tribe	3:58
6.	"Don't Talk"	Merchant, Drew	In My Tribe	5:06
7.	"What's the Matter Here"	Merchant, Buck	In My Tribe	4:52
8.	"Hey Jack Kerouac"	Merchant, Buck	In My Tribe	3:27
9.	"Verdi Cries"	Merchant	In My Tribe	4:24
10.	"Trouble Me"	Merchant, Drew	Blind Man's Zoo	3:15
11.	"Poison in the Well"	Merchant, Drew	Blind Man's Zoo	3:09
12.	"You Happy Puppet"	Merchant, Buck	Blind Man's Zoo	3:39
13.	"Eat for Two"	Merchant	Blind Man's Zoo	3:32
14.	"Stockton Gala Days"	Jerome Augustyniak, Steve Gustafson, Merchant, Buck, Drew	Our Time in Eden	4:22
15.	"Candy Everybody Wants"	Merchant, Drew	Our Time in Eden	3:08
16.	"These Are Days"	Merchant, Buck	Our Time in Eden	3:43
17.	"Because the Night" (Patti Smith Group cover)	Patti Smith, Bruce Springsteen	MTV Unplugged	3:44

Disc two – The Obscure & Unknown Recordings
No.	Title	Writer(s)	Original release	Length
1.	"Poppy Selling Man"	Merchant	Previously unreleased	3:34
2.	"Can't Ignore the Train" (Demo)	Merchant, Lombardo	Previously unreleased	2:53
3.	"Peace Train" (Cat Stevens cover)	Stevens	In My Tribe	3:28
4.	"Wildwood Flower" (Carter Family cover)	A. P. Carter	"Eat for Two" single	1:53
5.	"Hello in There" (John Prine cover)	Prine	"Eat for Two" single	4:27
6.	"To Sir with Love" (Lulu cover; featuring Michael Stipe)	Donald Black, Mark London	MTV's Rock n' Roll Inaugural Ball	4:17
7.	"Everyday Is Like Sunday" (Morrissey cover)	Morrissey, Stephen Street	"Candy Everybody Wants" single	3:15
8.	"These Days" (Jackson Browne cover)	Browne	Rubáiyát: Elektra's 40th Anniversary	3:28
9.	"I Hope That I Don't Fall in Love with You" (Tom Waits cover)	Waits	Step Right Up: The Songs of Tom Waits	3:39
10.	"Starman" (David Bowie cover)	Bowie	"These Are Days" single	4:14
11.	"Let the Mystery Be" (Iris DeMent cover; featuring David Byrne)	DeMent	MTV Unplugged	3:10
12.	"Noah's Dove" (Demo)	Merchant	Previously unreleased	4:12
13.	"Circle Dream" (Alternate Lyrics Demo)	Merchant, Augustyniak, Buck, Drew, Gustafson	Previously unreleased	3:25
14.	"Eden" (Alternate Lyrics Demo)	Merchant, Augustyniak, Buck, Drew, Gustafson	Previously unreleased	3:33

Notes

- "Tension" originally appeared on the EP Human Conflict Number Five. The version present on Campfire Songs is from Secrets of the I Ching. A third studio recording of the same song, re-titled "Tension Makes a Tangle", appears on The Wishing Chair.

== Personnel ==
10,000 Maniacs

- Natalie Merchant – vocals, piano
- Robert Buck – guitars, mandolin, steel, banjo, devices, synthesizer
- Dennis Drew – organ, piano, accordion
- Steven Gustafson – guitar, bass guitar
- John Lombardo – guitars, bass guitar, occasional vocals (CD 1, tracks 1–4 and CD 2, tracks 1–2)
- Jerome Augustyniak – drums, percussion (except CD 1, track 1)

Technical

- 10,000 Maniacs – producer, compilation
- Bill Waldman – producer
- Joe Boyd – producer
- Peter Asher – producer
- Paul Fox – producer
- Gary Smith – producer
- Lenny Kaye – producer
- Natalie Merchant – compilation, art direction
- Dan Hersch – remastering
- Bill Inglot – remastering
- Steve Woolard – discographical annotation
- Julee Stover – editorial supervision
- Mary Lynch – design assistance
