= Blind Man's Zoo =

Studio album by 10,000 Maniacs
- Released: May 4, 1989
- Recorded: November 1988–March 1989
- Studio: Dreamland, West Hurley, New York
- Length: 43:14
- Label: Elektra
- Producer: Peter Asher

10,000 Maniacs chronology
In My Tribe (1987)	Blind Man's Zoo (1989)	Hope Chest (1990)

Singles from Blind Man's Zoo
- 1. "Trouble Me"; 2. "Eat for Two"; 3. "You Happy Puppet"

Blind Man's Zoo is the fourth studio album by American alternative rock band 10,000 Maniacs. It was released on May 4, 1989, by Elektra Records. The album contains songs addressing social issues and current events, which occurred during and before the production of the album. The track "Trouble Me" was written as a dedication to the father of the band's lead singer Natalie Merchant.

"Eat for Two", "Trouble Me", and "You Happy Puppet" were released as singles. The first two of the three charted in the United States, and "Trouble Me" charted in the United Kingdom. Blind Man's Zoo received mixed reviews from music critics, some of whom praised the overall content while others criticized the music and lyrics. It reached number 13 on the US Billboard 200 chart and was certified platinum by the Recording Industry Association of America (RIAA) in the US. The album charted at number 18 on the UK Albums Chart and was certified silver by the British Phonographic Industry (BPI) in the UK.

== Background and development ==
At the time of Blind Man's Zoo being released, the members of 10,000 Maniacs were American singer-songwriter Natalie Merchant, keyboardist Dennis Drew, bassist Steve Gustafson, guitarist Rob Buck, and drummer Jerry Augustyniak. The band's first few releases—the Human Conflict Number Five EP (1982) and Secrets of the I Ching LP (1983), issued under their own record label Christian Burial Music—had lacked commercial success. These were followed by 10,000 Maniacs' second studio album, The Wishing Chair (1985), after they signed a contract with Elektra Records. The band's third album, In My Tribe, was released in July 1987 and became modestly successful, particularly due to its moderate hit single "Like the Weather", which was released six months thereafter.

Blind Man's Zoo's title was inspired by a fictional game from a children's book. The album's production occurred from November 1988 to March 1989. The recording location was Dreamland Recording Studios, a converted rural church in Woodstock, New York. The mixing occurred at Right Track Studios in Manhattan.

== Themes and lyrics ==
Numerous songs on Blind Man's Zoo were inspired by social issues and contemporaneous events, despite Merchant's limited knowledge of politics. Merchant said that most of the album stems from her recurring theme of betrayal. Music critic Anthony DeCurtis considered it "a starkly pessimistic statement" in contrast to the band's usual "greatest professional optimism".

The first track, "Eat for Two", is about a teenage girl who is five months pregnant. Merchant did not intend for the song to have an anti-abortion message, and it does not address abortion. Blind Man's Zoo's second track, "Please Forgive Us", concerns the United States interventions in Central America, especially the Iran–Contra affair. The third track, "The Big Parade", references visitors of the Vietnam Veterans Memorial in Washington, D.C., and the Vietnam War legacy. The fourth track, "Trouble Me", is a ballad featuring music composed by Dennis Drew and lyrics by Merchant in dedication to her father, who was hospitalized at the time of the writing. Gospel singer Jevetta Steele provided background vocals for the song. Merchant said, "The most uplifting song is 'Trouble Me', which seems like the antidote for all the rest of the album."

The seventh track, "Poison in the Well", concerns a neighborhood suffering from effects of hazardous waste and refers to the chemical waste site Love Canal, which caused multiple cases of cancer and infertility. The eighth track, "Dust Bowl", is about a plighted mother financially struggling to raise her children in an impoverished manufacturing town. The ninth track, "The Lion's Share", concerns, as music critic Stephen Holden wrote, "colonialism's bitter fruits". "Hateful Hate", the tenth track of Blind Man's Zoo, concerns the European colonization of Africa as well as racial tensions between the European descendants and native Africans. The final track, "Jubilee", is a "semi[-]operatic" song about religious fanaticism involving a racist who burns down a dance hall, in which he had witnessed "a black girl and a white boy kissing shamelessly".

== Release and promotion ==
Blind Man's Zoo was released on May 4, 1989 in the US and May 15 in the United Kingdom. "Eat for Two", "Trouble Me", and "You Happy Puppet" were released as singles from the album. Music videos for "Eat for Two", "Trouble Me", "You Happy Puppet", "Dust Bowl", and "Hateful Hate" were included on the VHS album 10,000 Maniacs: Time Capsule, Filmed 1982–1990. The band's live performances of "Eat for Two" and "Trouble Me" were released on its 1993 MTV Unplugged album release.

== Critical reception ==
Professional ratings
Review scores
Source	Rating
AllMusic	3.5/5 stars
CD Review	8/10 (performance); 8/10 (sound quality)
Chicago Tribune	3.5/4 stars
The New Rolling Stone Album Guide	3/5 stars
Rolling Stone	4/5 stars
The Village Voice	B−

Blind Man's Zoo was met with mixed reviews from music critics. The Chicago Tribune reviewer Greg Kot praised the album for "Merchant's powerful lyricism" on "the global theme of betrayal". Rolling Stone reviewer David Browne called the album 10,000 Maniacs's "best record", praising the band as "more focused" and "Buck's darting guitars [as] more powerful than ever". Spin journalist Timothy White in July 1989 called the album 10,000 Maniacs's "best release" to that date. Fellow Spin journalist Jonathan Van Meter considered the lyrics "concerned, self-righteous, [and] at times pretentious yet thoroughly engaging". CD Review's Larry Canale criticized Merchant's "unintelligible" vocals but praised her "novelettes and the band's sprightly, sometimes edgy melodies". The staff of People praised the music of the album, especially Buck's guitar performance, but found it "monotonous" and further called "Jubilee" "a major downer".

The Village Voice critic Robert Christgau acknowledged Merchant's "own prosaic prosody with off-kilter guitar accentuating its eccentric undertow", while he highlighted the album's second half of occasionally successful politics, "like when the lottery-playing mom of 'Dust Bowl' rubs her fevered youngest down with rubbing alcohol". However, he was resigned to report Merchant's inability to "listen to 'common sense firm arguments'", singling out "Hateful Hate" for how it "brushes by slavery on its way to elephanticide [sic] and ends up condemning 'curiosity'—again and again".

In retrospective reviews, AllMusic's Chris Woodstra considered the album inferior to its predecessor In My Tribe and wrote that despite "all of its earnestness and good-intentioned teachings, Blind Man's Zoo ultimately fails in its heavy-handed and generally uninteresting approach". J.D. Considine, reviewing in The New Rolling Stone Album Guide, wrote that the album "isn't quite as cheerful, but despite its issue-oriented focus, Merchant and her bandmates never turn their songs into a bully pulpit".

== Commercial performance ==
In the US, Blind Man's Zoo reached number 13 on the Billboard 200 chart for the week ending July 29, 1989. The album posited number 47 on the 1989 year-end chart of the Billboard 200. It was certified gold for shipping 500,000 units in the US on July 11, 1989, and later received a platinum certification for shipments of 1,000,000 units in the country on December 12, 1997, both of which were awarded by the Recording Industry Association of America (RIAA), making it 10,000 Maniacs's fourth album to achieve the latter certification. Blind Man's Zoo debuted and peaked at number 18 on the UK Albums Chart for the week ending May 27, 1989. It was certified silver by the British Phonographic Industry (BPI) for shipping 60,000 units in the UK on August 14, 1989. It became the band's highest-charting album in both the US and the UK.

On the US charts, "Trouble Me" reached number 20 at the Mainstream Rock chart for the week ending July 8, 1989, number 3 on the Modern Rock Tracks chart for the week ending June 10, number 44 on the Billboard Hot 100 for the week ending August 12, and number 7 on the Adult Contemporary chart for the week ending August 19, 1989. "Trouble Me" reached number 77 on the UK Singles Chart for the week ending June 17, 1989. "Eat for Two" reached number 12 on the Billboard Modern Rock Tracks chart for the week ending August 12, 1989, and number 93 on the UK Singles Chart for the week ending November 11.

== Track listing ==
Credits are adapted from the album's booklet. All lyrics by Natalie Merchant.

Side one
No.	Title	Music	Length
1.	"Eat for Two"	Natalie Merchant	3:26
2.	"Please Forgive Us"	Robert Buck	3:22
3.	"The Big Parade"	Jerome Augustyniak	4:00
4.	"Trouble Me"	Dennis Drew	3:08
5.	"You Happy Puppet"	Buck	3:35
6.	"Headstrong"	Merchant	4:13

Side two
No.	Title	Music	Length
7.	"Poison in the Well"	Drew	3:05
8.	"Dust Bowl"	Buck	4:11
9.	"The Lion's Share"	Drew, Merchant	3:00
10.	"Hateful Hate"	Merchant	4:28
11.	"Jubilee"	Merchant	6:07

== Personnel ==
Credits are adapted from the album's booklet.

10,000 Maniacs

- Natalie Merchant – vocals; piano and pipe organ on "Hateful Hate"
- Robert Buck – electric guitar, acoustic guitar
- Dennis Drew – organ, piano
- Steve Gustafson – bass guitar
- Jerome Augustyniak – drums

Additional musicians

- Jevetta Steele – backing vocals on "Trouble Me"
- Orchestra of St. Luke's – orchestra on "Jubilee":
  - Krista Bennion Feeney – first violin
  - Mitsuru Tsubota – second violin
  - Louise Schulman – viola
  - Myron Lutzke – cello
  - Dennis Godburn – bassoon
  - Robert Wolinsky – harpsichord
- Scott Kuney – classical guitar on "Jubilee"
- Frank Luther – double bass on "Jubilee"

Technical

- Peter Asher – producer
- Frank Filipetti – engineer, mixing
- Dave Cook – assistant engineer
- Dennice Brown – mixing assistant
- Jeff Abikzer – mixing assistant
- Darren Brown – "nimble technician"
- Larry Knight – "nimble technician"
- Jason Osborn – orchestral arrangement and direction on "Jubilee"
- Frank Olinsky (Manhattan Design) – packaging
- Natalie Merchant – packaging

== Charts ==
=== Weekly charts ===
Weekly charts for Blind Man's Zoo
Chart (1989)	Peak position
Spain (Promusicae)	47
UK Albums (OCC)	18
US Billboard 200	13

=== Year-end charts ===
Year-end charts for Blind Man's Zoo
Chart (1989)	Position
US Billboard 200	47

== Certifications ==
Certifications for Blind Man's Zoo
Region	Certification	Certified units/sales
United Kingdom (BPI)	Silver	60,000^{^}
United States (RIAA)	Platinum	1,000,000^{^}
^{^} Shipments figures based on certification alone.
