= The Mighty Wallop! =

American alternative rock band

- Origin: Jamestown, New York
- Genres: Alternative rock
- Past members: Dennis Drew; Steve Gustafson; Jeff Erickson; Ryan Seekings; Stan Barton

The Mighty Wallop! was a short-lived band from Jamestown, New York formed by Dennis Drew, Steve Gustafson, and Jeff Erickson of the band 10,000 Maniacs in 2001.

It was quickly a sextet, which included Ryan Seekings on drums, Stan Barton on fiddle, and another guitar player. Drew and Erickson recorded around 50 songs as demos, and the band played a handful of shows as a sextet through Summer, 2001, most notably the well-received performance at The Great Blue Heron Music Festival in 2001. Shortly after that performance, the band restructured itself into a trio (Drew, Gustafson, and Erickson), performing occasionally through 2002.

In 2013, 10,000 Maniacs released their first studio album since 1999. Music from the Motion Picture contains many songs written for and performed by The Mighty Wallop! including "I Don't Love You Too", "Gold", "When We Walked On Clouds", "It's a Beautiful Life", "Fine Line", "Tiny Arrows", and "Downhill." The song "Live For the Time of Your Life" was originally a Mighty Wallop! song, but was drastically rewritten for 10,000 Maniacs.
