= Playing Favorites (10,000 Maniacs album) =

Live album by 10,000 Maniacs
- Released: June 3, 2016
- Recorded: September 13, 2014
- Venues: Reg Lenna Center for the Arts, Jamestown, New York (additional recording and mixing at the Fun House, Silver Creek, New York)
- Genres: Alternative rock, folk rock
- Language: English
- Label: Omnivore Recordings

10,000 Maniacs chronology
Twice Told Tales (2015)	Playing Favorites (2016)	Live at the Belly Up (2017)

Professional ratings
Review scores
Source	Rating
AllMusic	3/5 stars

Playing Favorites is a live album by American alternative rock band 10,000 Maniacs released in 2016. The album was recorded on September 13, 2014, at the Reg Lenna Center for the Arts in Jamestown, New York. This is their first live album with current lead vocalist Mary Ramsey and also marks the return of founding member John Lombardo who contributes lead vocals on "My Mother the War".

== Track listing ==
1. "What's the Matter Here" (Rob Buck, Natalie Merchant) – 5:11
2. "Like the Weather" (Natalie Merchant) – 4:10
3. "Love Among the Ruins" (Jerome Augustyniak, Rob Buck, Dennis Drew, Steve Gustafson, John Lombardo, Mary Ramsey, Jules Shear) – 4:15
4. "Trouble Me" (Dennis Drew, Natalie Merchant) – 3:25
5. "More Than This" (Bryan Ferry) – 4:08
6. "Can't Ignore the Train" (John Lombardo, Natalie Merchant) – 3:29
7. "Stockton Gala Days" (Jerome Augustyniak, Rob Buck, Dennis Drew, Steve Gustafson, Natalie Merchant) – 7:38
8. "Because the Night" (Patti Smith, Bruce Springsteen) – 5:38
9. "Rainy Day" (Jerome Augustyniak, Rob Buck, Dennis Drew, Steve Gustafson, John Lombardo, Mary Ramsey) – 6:56
10. "Candy Everybody Wants" (Dennis Drew, Natalie Merchant) – 3:21
11. "My Sister Rose" (Jerome Augustyniak, Natalie Merchant) – 4:19
12. "Hey Jack Kerouac" (Rob Buck, Natalie Merchant) – 3:46
13. "These Are Days" (Rob Buck, Natalie Merchant) – 5:03
14. "My Mother the War" (John Lombardo, Natalie Merchant, Michael Walsh) – 4:42

== Personnel ==
10,000 Maniacs

- Jerome Augustyniak – drums, backing vocals
- Dennis Drew – keyboards, mixing
- Jeff Erickson – lead guitar
- Steve Gustafson – bass guitar, backing vocals, mixing
- John Lombardo – guitar, lead vocals on "My Mother the War"
- Mary Ramsey – lead vocals, viola

Additional musicians

- Melanie Luciano – backing vocals, acoustic guitar
- Bryan Eckenrode – cello
- Oliver Chezliak – trombone
- Eric Crittenden – alto saxophone
- Robert Browning – tenor saxophone

Additional album credits

- Produced and by Armand John Petri and 10,000 Maniacs
- Engineered and mixed by Armand John Petri
- Mastered by Vic Anesini at Battery Studios, New York
