= The Unplugged Collection, Volume One =

Compilation album by Various Artists
- Released: December 6, 1994
- Recorded: 1989–1993
- Genre: Rock music
- Length: 72:58
- Label: Warner Records
- Producer: Various Artists

Various Artists chronology
The Unplugged Collection, Volume One (1994)	The Very Best Of MTV Unplugged, Vol. 1 (2003)

The Unplugged Collection, Volume One is a compilation of performances taken from MTV Unplugged featuring sixteen artists – including R.E.M., k.d. lang, Stevie Ray Vaughan, and Soul Asylum.

The songs were culled from the artists' appearances on the show in the 1990s. Individual songs also appeared on the artists' own albums, such as Eric Clapton's Unplugged, Rod Stewart's Unplugged...and Seated, 10,000 Maniacs' MTV Unplugged, Paul McCartney's Unplugged (The Official Bootleg), and Annie Lennox's Cold. Colder. Coldest.

== Reception ==
On its release, the blues and rock compilation received mixed reviews, with some calling it slapdash, "short on innovation", with "mediocre, uninspired efforts". Some criticism focused on the song selection and the quality of the recordings. However, reaction to the album, and the performances may be a reflection of negative views held towards MTV itself more than the artists. In keeping with MTVs perceived preference of showcasing male artists, only three of the sixteen performers were female.

According to Spin's James Hunter, Annie Lennox, "sings 'Why,' the best thing she has ever done," Elton John and Paul Simon give "completely realized" performances and Rod Stewart "sings the shit" out of "Gasoline Alley" (the title track of his eponymous 1972 album, co-written with Ronnie Wood). Neil Young rescores "Like a Hurricane" using harmonica and pump organ. On McCartney's "We Can Work It Out", a performance mistake is left in the recording; Hunter characterizes McCartney as being "tickled by the wonderful informality of it all."

== Track listing ==
No.	Title	Writer(s)	Performer	Length
1.	"Pride and Joy"	Stevie Ray Vaughan	Stevie Ray Vaughan	3:49
2.	"Before You Accuse Me"	Ellas McDaniel	Eric Clapton	3:45
3.	"Are You Gonna Go My Way"	Lenny Kravitz; Craig Ross	Lenny Kravitz	6:25
4.	"Somebody to Shove"	Dave Pirner	Soul Asylum	3:43
5.	"Barefoot"	k.d. lang; Bob Telson	k.d. lang	3:54
6.	"Graceland"	Paul Simon	Paul Simon	5:11
7.	"Don't Let the Sun Go Down on Me"	Elton John; Bernie Taupin	Elton John	6:48
8.	"Like a Hurricane"	Neil Young	Neil Young	4:44
9.	"Gasoline Alley"	Rod Stewart; Ronnie Wood	Rod Stewart	3:39
10.	"Pink Houses"	John Mellencamp	John Mellencamp	5:21
11.	"We Can Work It Out"	John Lennon; Paul McCartney	Paul McCartney	2:57
12.	"Deep Dark Truthful Mirror"	Declan MacManus	Elvis Costello & The Rude 5	4:51
13.	"Come Rain or Come Shine"	Harold Arlen; Johnny Mercer	Don Henley	3:46
14.	"Why"	Annie Lennox	Annie Lennox	4:59
15.	"Don't Talk"	Natalie Merchant; Dennis Drew	10,000 Maniacs	5:26
16.	"Half A World Away"	Peter Buck; Mike Mills; Michael Stipe; Bill Berry	R.E.M.	3:40
Total length:				72:58

== Charts and certifications ==
=== Weekly charts ===
Chart (1994/95)	Peak position
US Billboard 200	97

=== Certifications ===
Region	Certification	Certified units/sales
United States (RIAA)	Gold	500,000^{^}
^{^} Shipments figures based on certification alone.
