= League of Blind Women =

American alternative rock band

- Origin: Dallas, Texas
- Genres: Alternative rock
- Years active: 1998–1999, 2001
- Labels: mp3.com
- Past members: Robert Buck; Jerry Augustyniak; Mike Scaccia; Kol Marshall; Chris Kelly; Casey Orr; Mitch Marine; Dave Dunn

League of Blind Women was a short-lived alternative rock supergroup that included Rob Buck (lead guitar) and Jerry Augustyniak (drums) from 10,000 Maniacs, Casey Orr (bass) from Gwar and Rigor Mortis, Mike Scaccia (guitar) from Ministry and Rigor Mortis, Kol Marshall (keyboards) from Critical Mass and See No Evil, and Chris Kelly (vocals). When Casey Orr left the band in March 1999 to return to Gwar, Mitch Marine from Tripping Daisy took his place on bass. Dave Dunn played drums with the band after Jerry Augustyniak left.

The band produced two known sets of demos, a five-song EP and an additional song later on. They recorded at least some of their material at Nomad Studio in Carrollton, Texas.

Buck left 10,000 Maniacs for several months in 1998-1999 to concentrate on League of Blind Women and was replaced in the Maniacs by Michael Lee Jackson of the band Animal Planet. Jackson returned to Animal Planet. Buck returned to 10,000 Maniacs in 1999 and it was apparent he was ill. Buck died on December 19, 2000, of liver failure.

In 2001, League of Blind Women released the five-song EP League of Blind Women. Credits say it featured Chris Kelly on vocals, Mike Scaccia on guitars, and Kol Marshall on keyboards, but these were slightly remixed versions of the demos that had been recorded featuring Rob Buck on guitar.

All songs were written by Chris Kelly, Rob Buck/Mike Scaccia.

== Unofficial Discography ==
- Demos (Dogs) 1998 electric demos
  - songs:
    1. "Tom Dooley" (3:17)
    2. "Carried Away" (5:24)
    3. "Things Left Unsaid" (4:59)
    4. "Wait Here Now" (5:43)
    5. "Another Like You" (6:12)
- Demos (Cats) 1998 acoustic demos
  - songs:
    1. "Angel of Conspiracy" (4:31)
    2. "Hopeless" (6:05)
    3. "Heavy Smoke" (5:15)
    4. "Between the Lines" (4:46)
- Other recorded after Buck left the band
  - song:
    1. "Memories Remain" (5:18)

== Discography ==
- League of Blind Women (released: 2001, ©1998 Milo Music, mp3.com, DAM_CD 741937714186-20478)
  - songs:
    1. "Another Like You" (6:17)
    2. "Hopeless" (6:38)
    3. "Things Left Unsaid" (5:02)
    4. "Carried Away" (5:32)
    5. "Angel of Conspiracy" (4:33)
