= Evening in Torpor =

Studio album by The Ashtrays
- Released: 1988
- Recorded: 1981, Fredonia State College: Fredonia, NY
- Genre: Experimental
- Length: 28:47
- Language: English, French
- Label: Community 3
- Producer: Albert Garzon

Evening in Torpor was a student-project that Natalie Merchant and Rob Buck from the band 10,000 Maniacs were involved with around the time that 10,000 Maniacs was beginning. All of the songs were written by Albert Garzon. Natalie contributed vocals to "Daffodils," "Mother's Family Ring," "Crumble Down," and "Bathroom Tile Dance," while Rob contributed guitar to "Rectangles," "Daffodils," "Mother's Family Ring," The Playground," Crumble Down," and "Bathroom Tile Dance." The other tracks on the album ("les Cendriers" and "Defense Rap Trip") included no future Maniacs. The song "les Cendriers," which translates from French as "ashtrays" is the only reference to the name of the makeshift band.

The record was released by Community 3, or simply Comm3, in 1988 and taken off the market under a paid agreement with 10,000 Maniacs.

== Track listing ==
1. "Rectangles"
2. "Daffodils"
3. "les Cendriers"
4. "Mother's Family Ring"
5. "The Playground"
6. "Crumble Down"
7. "Defense Rap Trip"
8. "Bathroom Tile Dance"

== Credits ==
- Natalie Merchant: vocals
- Rob Buck: guitar
- Kathy Good: vocals
- Albert Garzon: drums, synthesizers, piano, vocals, drums
- Bill Zules: organ and prepared piano
- Mary Floramo: poetry & recitation
- Tracey Rammacher: vocals
- Stacey Rammacher: vocals
- Teresa Genovese: English horn
- Ken Beckenstein: drums
- Dave Hudson: cello
- Harry Jacobson: bass
