= MTV Unplugged (10,000 Maniacs album) =

Live album by 10,000 Maniacs
- Released: October 26, 1993
- Recorded: April 21, 1993
- Venues: Sony Music, New York City
- Genres: Alternative rock, folk rock, soft rock
- Length: 60:03
- Language: English
- Label: Elektra
- Producer: Paul Fox

10,000 Maniacs chronology
Our Time in Eden (1992)	MTV Unplugged (1993)	Love Among the Ruins (1997)

Singles from MTV Unplugged
- 1. "Because the Night" Released: October 11, 1993

MTV Unplugged is a 1993 live album and video by American alternative rock band 10,000 Maniacs, recorded for the MTV Unplugged series. The album was certified triple platinum by the Recording Industry Association of America and spawned the hit single "Because the Night", a cover of the song written by Patti Smith and Bruce Springsteen. Between the recording and release of the album, vocalist Natalie Merchant left the band to pursue a solo career.

== Outtakes ==
Many songs were recorded during the performance that were not included on the album. These included four takes of "How You've Grown" and a brief take of "Puff the Magic Dragon". In addition, three songs were performed with David Byrne as a guest singer: two takes of "Let the Mystery Be" (one of which was released as a B-side to "Few and Far Between" and reissued on Campfire Songs: The Popular, Obscure and Unknown Recordings of 10,000 Maniacs), Dolly Parton's "Jolene" and "Dallas".

== Reissue from Rhino ==
The album was re-released by Rhino Entertainment on CD (digipak) and vinyl (double LP) in September 2024. This version includes remastered versions of the songs from the original album, and three bonus tracks featuring David Byrne: "Let the Mystery Be", "Jolene", and "Dallas".

== Reception ==
Professional ratings
Review scores
Source	Rating
AllMusic	2/5 stars
Entertainment Weekly	B−
Los Angeles Times	3.5/4 stars
Pitchfork	8.1/10
Q	4/5 stars
The Rolling Stone Album Guide	3.5/5 stars

"With Natalie Merchant since gone solo", wrote Rolling Stone critic Paul Evans, "the 10,000 Maniacs set is a fine souvenir ... they flourish their gift for intricate texture – and Merchant's voice is the essence of lilt."

The album debuted at its No. 13 peak and spent 45 weeks on the Billboard charts. In December 1997, it was certified 3× Platinum by the RIAA.

The single release "Because the Night" reached No. 11 on the Billboard Hot 100 chart, two positions higher than Patti Smith's original version in 1978. It remains the band's biggest hit.

== Track listing ==
Cassette/CD

1. "These Are Days" (Rob Buck, Natalie Merchant) – 4:22
2. "Eat for Two" (Merchant) – 4:12
3. "Candy Everybody Wants" (Dennis Drew, Merchant) – 3:19
4. "I'm Not the Man" (Merchant) – 3:46
5. "Don't Talk" (Drew, Merchant) – 5:22
6. "Hey Jack Kerouac" (Buck, Merchant) – 3:29
7. "What's the Matter Here?" (Buck, Merchant) – 4:50
8. "Gold Rush Brides" (Buck, Merchant) – 4:12
9. "Like the Weather" (Merchant) – 4:15
10. "Trouble Me" (Drew, Merchant) – 3:40
11. "Jezebel" (Merchant) – 4:20
12. "Because the Night" (Bruce Springsteen, Patti Smith) – 3:44
13. "Stockton Gala Days" (Jerome Augustyniak, Buck, Drew, Steve Gustafson, Merchant) – 5:25
14. "Noah's Dove" (Merchant) – 5:07

CD reissue and LP from Rhino

same as Cassette/CD, with the addition of the following bonus tracks:

1. "Let the Mystery Be" (Iris DeMent) (with David Byrne) – 3:08
2. "Jolene" (Dolly Parton) (with David Byrne) – 2:50
3. "Dallas" (Jimmie Dale Gilmore) (with David Byrne) – 4:10

LaserDisc/VHS

1. "Noah's Dove" (Merchant)
2. "These Are Days" (Buck, Merchant)
3. "Eat for Two" (Merchant)
4. "Candy Everybody Wants" (Drew, Merchant)
5. "I'm Not the Man" (Merchant)
6. "Don't Talk" (Drew, Merchant)
7. "Hey Jack Kerouac" (Buck, Merchant)
8. "What's the Matter Here?" (Buck, Merchant)
9. "Gold Rush Brides" (Buck, Merchant)
10. "Like the Weather" (Merchant)
11. "Trouble Me" (Drew, Merchant)
12. "Jezebel" (Merchant)
13. "Stockton Gala Days" (Augustyniak, Buck, Drew, Gustafson, Merchant)
14. "Because the Night" (Springsteen, Smith)
15. "Let the Mystery Be" (Iris DeMent) (with David Byrne)
16. "Jolene" (Dolly Parton) (with David Byrne)
17. "Dallas" (Jimmie Dale Gilmore) (with David Byrne) / End Credits
- During the introduction to "Hey Jack Kerouac", Merchant reads a passage from On the Road by Jack Kerouac. During the introduction to "Gold Rush Brides", she reads a passage from Women's Diaries of the Westward Journey by Lillian Schlissel.

== Personnel ==
10,000 Maniacs

- Natalie Merchant – lead vocals, piano
- Rob Buck – acoustic guitar
- Dennis Drew – piano, Hammond organ, pump organ
- Steven Gustafson – acoustic bass guitar
- Jerome Augustyniak – drums, percussion

Additional musicians

- Bill Dillon – acoustic guitar, mandolin, slide guitar
- Amanda Kramer – piano, pump organ
- Jerry Marotta – percussion
- Morgan Fichter – violin, background vocals
- Mary Ramsey – viola, background vocals
- Jane Scarpantoni – cello
- Richie Stearns – banjo
- Atsuko Sato – bassoon
- Kim Laskowski – bassoon
- David Byrne – guest vocals, guitar (video)

Technical

- Paul Fox – producer
- Ed Thacker – engineer, mixing
- Jay Vicari – engineer
- Mike Scott – engineer
- Chris Laidlaw – mixing assistant
- Stephen Marcussen – mastering (audio)
- Ebet Roberts – photography
- Frank Olinsky – package design (audio)
- Natalie Merchant – package design
- Barbara Lambert – package design (video)
- George Reisz – digital remastering (video)
- Francis Milano – digital remastering (video)

For MTV

- Alex Coletti – producer
- Milton Lage – director
- John Vesey – editor

== Charts ==
=== Weekly charts ===
Chart (1993–94)	Peak position
Canada Top Albums/CDs (RPM)	36
UK Albums (Official Charts)	40
US Billboard 200	13

Chart (2024)	Peak position
Croatian International Albums (HDU)	12
Hungarian Physical Albums (MAHASZ)	11

=== Year-end charts ===
Chart (1994)	Position
US Billboard 200	47
