= Reg Lenna Center for the Arts =

Performing arts center in Jamestown New York

The Reg Lenna Center for the Arts
- "The Reg"
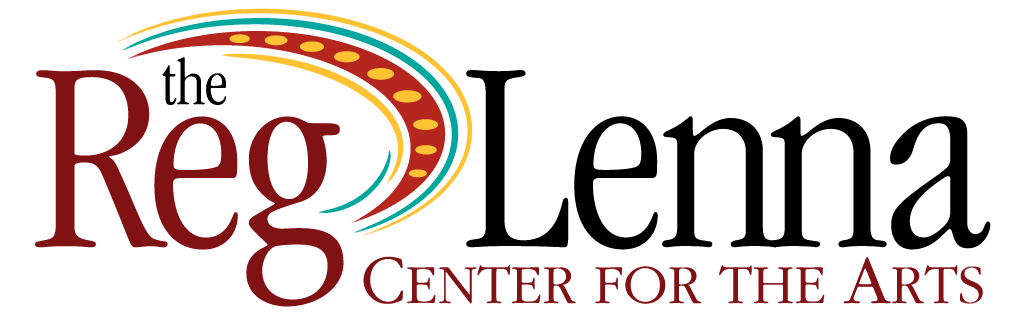

- Location in New York Location in United States
- Former names: The Palace Theater (1923-1987); The Reg Lenna Civic Center (1987-2013)
- Address: 116 East Third Street; Jamestown, New York 14701
- Coordinates: 42.096689°N 79.239267°W
- Capacity: 1,259
- Type: Theater
- Events: Music, film, concerts

Construction
- Built: 1923
- Opened: 12 October 1990
- Renovated: 1987

Website
- reglenna.com

The Reg Lenna Center for the Arts is a restored 1923 theater used as a community center for the performing arts in Jamestown, New York. The center is named after a notable local resident Reginald Lenna who donated $1 million to begin restoration work in 1987.

== History ==
In 2019, a $4.5 million renovation to the center expanded the complex to seven connected buildings. This work included the lobby, a new box office and concession stand, a relocated art gallery, a consolidated workspace for staff, and structural improvements. The Reg's low power radio station, WRFA, was expanded into a multimedia studio on the third floor.

== Notable events ==
- In February 1956, the second and final movie starring Lucille Ball and Desi Arnaz, Forever, Darling, premiered at the Palace theater, later known as The Reg.
- Lucie Arnaz appeared at the Reg Lenna Center for the Arts on August 3, 2012, to support the Lucille Ball Festival of New Comedy held annually in Jamestown, Lucille Ball's hometown.
- Playing Favorites, the first live album by 10,000 Maniacs, was recorded on September 13, 2014, at the Reg Lenna Center for the Arts.
