= WRFA-LP =

- Jamestown, New York; United States
- Broadcast area: Jamestown NY area
- Frequency: 107.9 MHz
- Branding: Radio For the Arts

Programming
- Format: Community radio; Public radio
- Affiliations: Pacifica Radio

Ownership
- Owner: Reg Lenna Center for the Arts

History
- First air date: September 13, 2004; 21 years ago
- Call sign meaning: Radio For the Arts

Technical information
- Licensing authority: FCC
- Facility ID: 132401
- Class: L1
- ERP: 100 watts
- HAAT: 10.6 meters
- Transmitter coordinates: 42°05′48″N 79°14′22″W

Links
- Public license information: LMS
- Webcast: Listen live
- Website: www.wrfalp.com

WRFA-LP (107.9 FM) is a public broadcasting community radio station licensed to Jamestown, New York. The station is currently owned by, and broadcasts from studios in, the Reg Lenna Center for the Arts, where it has been located since its launch in 2004.

From 2009 to 2023, WRFA-LP's operations were federally subsidized by the Corporation for Public Broadcasting, which provided a substantial portion of the station's revenue. Increases in the threshold to qualify for CPB funding rendered the station ineligible for future funding beyond October 1, 2023.

Dennis Drew, of 10,000 Maniacs, served as the station's general manager from its launch until he retired in 2021. From 2021 to 2023, the station was led by Jason Sample, who had spent the previous decade as WRFA's news director and worked at other Jamestown radio stations before that. Sample announced his resignation shortly after the loss of funding was announced in August 2023; another employee of the station, Julia Ciesla-Hanley, succeeded Sample on an interim basis. Anthony Merchant, the station's arts director and the nephew of 10,000 Maniacs frontwoman Natalie Merchant, was promoted to general manager in June 2025.

Until 2024, WRFA-LP had been the play-by-play broadcaster of the Jamestown Tarp Skunks baseball team.

The station's format could be considered similar to that of college radio. It is best known for its national, but unique, talk shows, its support of local musicians/arts, unique local volunteer hosted programs, wide variety of music, and interviews with musicians of all status. It also currently carries some syndicated music spotlight shows, such as the Pink Floyd program Floydian Slip, Acoustic Café, Le Show, StarTalk, the WoodSongs Old-Time Radio Hour, along with two Native Voice One nationally syndicated programs that had previously been on WGWE and are hosted by local native Brett Maybee: The Mainstream and Gae:no.

== See also ==
- List of community radio stations in the United States
