= Music from the Motion Picture (10,000 Maniacs album) =

Studio album by 10,000 Maniacs
- Released: February 26, 2013
- Recorded: July 2011 – May 2012
- Genre: Rock
- Length: 47:20
- Language: English
- Label: Ruby Wristwatch

10,000 Maniacs chronology
Triangles (EP) (2011)	Music from the Motion Picture (2013)	Twice Told Tales (2015)

Professional ratings
Review scores
Source	Rating
Allmusic	3/5 stars

Music from the Motion Picture is an album by 10,000 Maniacs. The album, their first full-length in 14 years, contains eleven original songs. This album is the first to feature guitarist Jeff Erickson since he took over for Robert Buck following his death in 2000, and the first Maniacs album to feature Mary Ramsey without her longtime music partner, John Lombardo. In addition to his guitar efforts, Erickson provides the first male lead vocals on a Maniacs song since John Lombardo's vocal on the Human Conflict Number Five album of 1982. As with 1999's The Earth Pressed Flat and the following 2015 album Twice Told Tales, the album did not chart in either the United States or the United Kingdom.

== Track listing ==
1. "I Don't Love You Too" (Dennis Drew) – 3:56
2. "When We Walked on Clouds" (Drew) – 5:25
3. "Gold" (Drew, Jeff Erickson) – 3:31
4. "Triangles" (Drew, Mary Ramsey) – 5:26
5. "Live for the Time of Your Life" (Drew, Ramsey) – 3:31
6. "Whippoorwill" (Ramsey) – 3:57
7. "It's a Beautiful Life" (Traditional; arranged by 10,000 Maniacs) – 4:32
8. "Fine Line" (Erickson) – 3:53
9. "Tiny Arrows" (Drew) – 6:22
10. "Downhill" (Drew) – 3:48
11. "Chautauqua Moon" (Ramsey) – 2:59

== Personnel ==
=== 10,000 Maniacs ===
- Jerome Augustyniak – percussion, drums, vocals
- Dennis Drew – organ, keyboards, vocals on track 10
- Jeff Erickson – guitar, vocals on tracks 3 & 8
- Steve Gustafson – bass guitar, vocals
- Mary Ramsey – violin, viola, vocals

=== Additional musicians ===
- John Merino – finger style guitar on track 2
- David Hone – additional programming and keyboards

=== Additional album credits ===
- Produced by 10,000 Maniacs
- Directed by Steven Gustafson
- Recorded & Mixed by David Hone
- Recorded at the Robert Lee Scharmann Theatre & FM Studios in Jamestown NY
- Additional Recording & Mixing at AllSound Media in Warren PA
- Mastered by Gavin Lurssen at Lurssen Mastering in Los Angeles, CA
- Producer Credits: Andreas Laemmermann, Adam Zeitz, Stephen Monroe, Julie Gochenour, Donald Semmens, Flavio Louzada Graciano, Harvey Kivel, Henry Houh, Murry Galloway, Charissa and James Campbell, Alan Cohen, Maggie Marlowe, Betty Cheung, Pedro Javier Serra Serrano, Myra Vignovic Blasius, James Lawrence
- 10,000 Maniacs Crew: Scott Barton, Colin Braeger
- Touring guitarist & vocalist: Melanie Luciano
- Managed Care: Gehrig Peterson
