= Steve Gustafson =

American bass guitarist (born 1957)

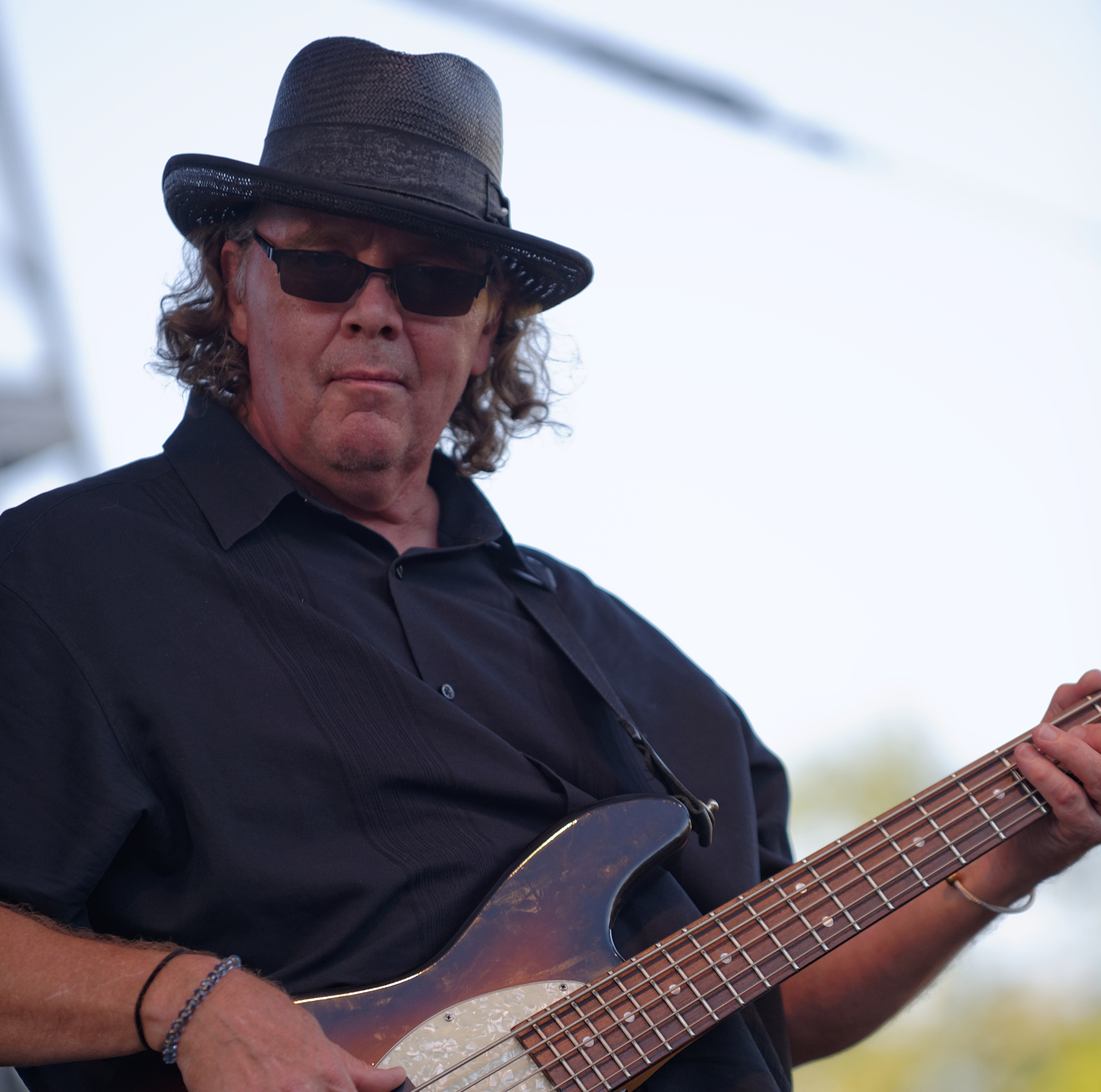
- Gustafson performing in 2015

Background information
- Born: April 10, 1957 (age 69); Seville, Spain
- Genres: Rock, alternative rock
- Occupation: Musician
- Instrument: Bass guitar
- Years active: 1981–present

Steven E. Gustafson (born April 10, 1957) is the bass guitarist for the American alternative rock band 10,000 Maniacs. He, Dennis Drew and John Lombardo are the only remaining founding members of the group. Drummer Jerome Augustyniak has been with the band since 1982. Singer Mary Ramsey has been working with the band since 1992 and has been the band's lead singer since 1994. Guitarist Jeff Erickson, former tech for Robert Buck, has been playing lead guitar with the band since 2001.

In 2011, with 10,000 Maniacs, Gustafson performed on a new EP and a 30-city 30th-anniversary tour. 10,000 Maniacs continue to tour.

== Discography ==
With 10,000 Maniacs

- Human Conflict Number Five (EP) (1982)
- Secrets of the I Ching (1983)
- The Wishing Chair (1985)
- In My Tribe (1987)
- Blind Man's Zoo (1989)
- Hope Chest: The Fredonia Recordings 1982-1983 (1990)
- Our Time in Eden (1992)
- MTV Unplugged (1993)
- Love Among the Ruins (1997)
- The Earth Pressed Flat (1999)
- Campfire Songs: The Popular, Obscure and Unknown Recordings (2004)
- Live Twenty-Five (2006)
- Extended Versions (2009)
- Triangles (EP) (2011)
- Music From The Motion Picture (2013)
- Twice Told Tales (2015)
- For Crying Out Loud (EP) (2016)
- Playing Favorites (2016)
- Live at the Belly Up (2017)
