= Trouble Me =

- 7-inch vinyl variant of the standard artwork

Single by 10,000 Maniacs

from the album Blind Man's Zoo
- Released: May 1989
- Recorded: November 1988 – March 1989
- Studio: Dreamland (Hurley, New York)
- Genre: Alternative rock
- Length: 3:08
- Label: Elektra
- Composer: Dennis Drew
- Lyricist: Natalie Merchant
- Producer: Peter Asher

10,000 Maniacs singles chronology
"What's the Matter Here" (1988)	"Trouble Me" (1989)	"Eat for Two" (1989)

"Trouble Me" is a song by the American alternative rock group 10,000 Maniacs and the first single from their 1989 album Blind Man's Zoo. The single was co-written by the band's then-lead singer, Natalie Merchant, as dedication to her father, Anthony Merchant. "Trouble Me" charted in both the United States and the United Kingdom, becoming a hit for the band. It peaked at number 44 on the Billboard Hot 100 chart. A live version with lead vocalist Mary Ramsey was also included on their 2016 album Playing Favorites.

== Background and production ==
"Trouble Me", composed by Dennis Drew with lyrics by Natalie Merchant, was the first released single from the album. The song was written for Merchant's father, Anthony, who was hospitalized at the time. Gospel singer Jevetta Steele provided the background vocals for the song. Merchant said in the late 1980s, "The most uplifting song is 'Trouble Me', which seems like the antidote for all the rest of [Blind Man's Zoo]."

== Music video ==
A music video for "Trouble Me" was produced, containing outdoor scenes. Merchant caught a common cold during the filming. It is included in the VHS release 10,000 Maniacs: Time Capsule, Filmed 1982–1990, later re-released on DVD as 10,000 Maniacs: Time Capsule, Filmed 1982–1993.

In the music video, while she performs the song in various scenes, Merchant takes an elderly woman on the bicycle to the place where the elderly woman's friends surprise her and then do activities. In the end, Merchant and the elderly woman ride on the bicycle to a shoreline.

== Reception ==
Music critic Anthony DeCurtis wrote, "Blind Man's Zoo, [which includes the song], is a starkly pessimistic statement." Chris Willman of Los Angeles Times reviewed the band's song performance at the 1989 Santa Barbara Bowl concert, calling it "honey in the soothing." Joseph Pryweller of Virginia's Daily Press reviewed the band's song performance at a 1989 Colonial Williamsburg concert, saying that the performance resembled songs from the band's previous album, In My Tribe, and "lacked special character."

== Charts ==
In the Billboard charts, "Trouble Me" reached number 20 on the Album Rock Tracks chart for the week ending July 8, 1989, number three on the Modern Rock Tracks chart for the week ending June 10, number 44 on the Hot 100 chart for the week ending August 12, and number seven on the Adult Contemporary chart for the week ending August 19, 1989. "Trouble Me" reached number 77 in the UK Singles Chart for the week ending June 17, 1989.

Chart (1989)	Peak position
Australian Singles Chart	102
UK Singles Chart	77
US Billboard Hot 100	44
US Billboard Adult Contemporary	7
US Billboard Album Rock Tracks	20
US Billboard Modern Rock Tracks	3

== In popular culture ==
The song is featured in the Dead of Summer episode, "Barney Rubble Eyes" (season 1, episode 2). Billboard reviewer Chuck Taylor said that the "[m]idtempo pacing" of James Blunt's song "1973" would resemble 10,000 Maniacs' song.
