= Hope Chest: The Fredonia Recordings 1982–1983 =

Compilation album by 10,000 Maniacs
- Released: October 1, 1990
- Recorded: 1982–1983
- Genre: Alternative rock
- Length: 46:13
- Label: Elektra
- Producer: 10,000 Maniacs; Bill Waldman; Albert Garzon

10,000 Maniacs chronology
Blind Man's Zoo (1989)	Hope Chest: The Fredonia Recordings 1982–1983 (1990)	Our Time in Eden (1992)

Professional ratings
Review scores
Source	Rating
AllMusic	2.5/5 stars
Entertainment Weekly	B
Rolling Stone	3/5 stars
The Rolling Stone Album Guide	3/5 stars

Hope Chest: The Fredonia Recordings 1982–1983, also known as just Hope Chest, is a compilation album of songs by American alternative rock band 10,000 Maniacs, released in 1990 by Elektra Records. It compiles tracks from their early releases Human Conflict Number Five (1982) and Secrets of the I Ching (1983). All tracks on the album are remixed from their original versions.

The original version of "Tension" from Human Conflict Number Five is not included on this compilation; only the re-recorded version of the song that was included on Secrets of the I Ching. Other than that, all of the songs from both releases are included on this disc—even "National Education Week", which had been dropped from later pressings of Secrets of the I Ching.

Two tracks on the album—"The Latin One" and "Anthem for Doomed Youth"—contain lyrics adapted from the works of British World War I poet Wilfred Owen, the latter being unique in the band's canon, as it features a lead vocal from guitarist John Lombardo.

== Track listing ==
All tracks are written by John Lombardo and Natalie Merchant, unless otherwise noted.

No.	Title	Writer(s)	Original release	Length
1.	"Planned Obsolescence"	Dennis Drew, Merchant	Human Conflict Number Five (1982)	4:26
2.	"The Latin One"	Lombardo, Wilfred Owen	Secrets of the I Ching (1983)	2:55
3.	"Katrina's Fair"	Robert Buck, Merchant	Secrets of the I Ching	2:56
4.	"Poor de Chirico"		Secrets of the I Ching	3:07
5.	"Grey Victory"	Lombardo, Buck, Merchant	Secrets of the I Ching	2:55
6.	"National Education Week"	Drew, Merchant	Secrets of the I Ching	2:55
7.	"Death of Manolete"		Secrets of the I Ching	3:44
8.	"Orange"		Human Conflict Number Five	2:20
9.	"Tension"		Secrets of the I Ching	3:28
10.	"Anthem for Doomed Youth"	Lombardo, Owen	Human Conflict Number Five	2:45
11.	"Daktari"		Secrets of the I Ching	4:08
12.	"Groove Dub"		Human Conflict Number Five	3:15
13.	"Pit Viper"	Steve Gustafson, Merchant	Secrets of the I Ching	3:50
14.	"My Mother the War"	Lombardo, Michael Walsh, Merchant	Secrets of the I Ching	3:29
Total length:				46:13

== Personnel ==
10,000 Maniacs

- Natalie Merchant – voice; background vocals on "Anthem for Doomed Youth"
- Robert Buck – lead guitar
- John Lombardo – rhythm guitar, bass guitar; lead vocals on "Anthem for Doomed Youth"
- Dennis Drew – organ
- Steven Gustafson – bass guitar
- Jerome Augustyniak – drums (tracks 2–7, 9, 11, 13–14)

Additional musicians

- Jim Foti – drums (tracks 1, 8, 10, 12)

Technical

- 10,000 Maniacs – co-producers (tracks 1–14)
- Bill Waldman – co-producer, engineer (tracks 1, 8, 10, 12)
- Mary Van Houten – engineer (tracks 1, 8, 10, 12)
- Gina Tampio – engineer (tracks 1, 8, 10, 12)
- Albert Garzon – co-producer, engineer (tracks 2–7, 9, 11, 13–14)
- Joe Barbaria – remixing
- Greg Calbi – mastering
- Ann States – Maniac photos
- Frank Olinsky (Manhattan Design) – packaging
- Natalie Merchant – packaging
- Grace Galloway – liner notes
