= The Wishing Chair (album) =

Studio album by 10,000 Maniacs
- Released: 23 September 1985
- Recorded: June 1984 – May 1985
- Studio: Livingston, London
- Genre: Alternative rock
- Length: 49:38
- Label: Elektra Records (US/Europe/Germany/Canada)
- Producer: Joe Boyd

10,000 Maniacs chronology
Secrets of the I Ching (1983)	The Wishing Chair (1985)	In My Tribe (1987)

Professional ratings
Review scores
Source	Rating
AllMusic	3/5 stars
Rolling Stone	(Not Rated)
The Rolling Stone Album Guide	3/5 stars

The Wishing Chair is the first major-label album by American alternative rock band 10,000 Maniacs, released in 1985 by Elektra Records. Recorded in London, the album did not achieve the commercial success some of their later releases would receive, but received mostly favorable reviews and brought the band more visibility than had their previous independent releases. A live concert video of "Scorpio Rising" was produced and received a moderate amount of airplay on MTV.

== Track listing ==
All lyrics by Natalie Merchant and music by John Lombardo, except where noted.

=== Original vinyl/cassette release ===
Side A

1. "Can't Ignore the Train" – 2:43
2. "Just as the Tide Was A Flowing" (Music: traditional; Lyrics: arranged by 10,000 Maniacs) – 2:25
3. "Scorpio Rising" (Music: Robert Buck, Lombardo; Lyrics: Merchant) – 3:06
4. "Lilydale" (Music: Buck; Lyrics: Merchant) – 3:11
5. "Maddox Table" (Music & lyrics: Merchant) – 3:19
6. "Everyone a Puzzle Lover" – 3:17

Side B

1. "Arbor Day" (Music & lyrics: Merchant) – 2:59
2. "Back o' the Moon" (Music: Dennis Drew; Lyrics: Merchant) – 3:32
3. "Tension Makes a Tangle" – 3:33
4. "Among the Americans" (Music: Buck, Drew; Lyrics: Merchant) – 3:07
5. "Grey Victory" (Music: Lombardo, Buck; Lyrics: Merchant) – 3:07
6. "Cotton Alley" – 3:23
7. "My Mother the War" (Music: Lombardo; Lyrics: Merchant, Michael Walsh) – 3:31

=== CD release ===
1. "Can't Ignore the Train" – 2:43
2. "Scorpio Rising" (Music: Buck, Lombardo; Lyrics: Merchant) – 3:06
3. "Just as the Tide Was A Flowing" (Music: traditional; Lyrics: arranged by 10,000 Maniacs) – 2:25
4. "Lilydale" (Music: Buck; Lyrics: Merchant) – 3:11
5. "Back o' the Moon" (Music: Drew; Lyrics: Merchant) – 3:32
6. "Maddox Table" (Music & lyrics: Merchant) – 3:19
7. "The Colonial Wing" – 4:02
8. "Grey Victory" (Music: Lombardo, Buck; Lyrics: Merchant) – 3:07
9. "Among the Americans" (Music: Buck, Drew; Lyrics: Merchant) – 3:07
10. "Everyone a Puzzle Lover" – 3:17
11. "Cotton Alley" – 3:23
12. "Daktari" – 4:23
13. "My Mother the War" (Music: Lombardo; Lyrics: Merchant, Walsh) – 3:31
14. "Tension Makes a Tangle" – 3:33
15. "Arbor Day" (Music & lyrics: Merchant) – 2:59

"The Colonial Wing" and "Daktari" were originally released on the 12-inch single of "Can't Ignore the Train", along with "Grey Victory".

"Grey Victory", "Daktari", "My Mother the War" and "Tension Makes a Tangle" are re-recorded versions of songs that had previously appeared on the band's 1983 release, Secrets of the I Ching. ("Tension Makes a Tangle" also appeared in yet another version on the band's very first record, the 1982 EP Human Conflict Number Five, titled simply "Tension", as it was on Secrets of the I Ching.)

== Personnel ==
10,000 Maniacs

- Natalie Merchant – voice
- Robert Buck – electric guitar/devices, acoustic guitar, mandolin, pedal steel
- John Lombardo – 6 and 12 string guitars, bass guitar
- Dennis Drew – organ, piano, accordion
- Steven Gustafson – bass guitar, electric guitar
- Jerry Augustyniak – drums

Technical

- Joe Boyd – producer
- Jerry Boys – engineer
- Tony Harris – engineer
- Barry Clempson – assistant engineer
- Jack Skinner – mastering
- 10,000 Maniacs – sleeve design
- T + CP – sleeve design
