= Our Time in Eden =

Studio album by 10,000 Maniacs
- Released: September 28, 1992
- Recorded: July 1991 – May 1992
- Studios: Bearsville (Woodstock, New York)
- Genres: Alternative rock, folk rock, jangle pop, college rock, soft rock
- Length: 47:55
- Label: Elektra
- Producer: Paul Fox

10,000 Maniacs chronology
Hope Chest (1990)	Our Time in Eden (1992)	MTV Unplugged (1993)

Singles from Our Time in Eden
- 1. "These Are Days" Released: August 31, 1992; 2. "Candy Everybody Wants" Released: March 29, 1993; 3. "Few and Far Between" Released: 1993

Our Time in Eden is the fifth studio album by American alternative rock band 10,000 Maniacs. It was released in 1992 on Elektra Records. The release is 10,000 Maniacs' last studio album with original lead singer Natalie Merchant. The album included her future replacement Mary Ramsey on violin and viola on such tracks as "Stockton Gala Days" and "How You've Grown". Singles released from the album were "These Are Days", "Candy Everybody Wants" and "Few and Far Between". The brass and woodwind section is covered by James Brown's band the J.B.'s. The album had the working title African Violet Society.

== Critical reception ==
Professional ratings
Review scores
Source	Rating
AllMusic	4.5/5 stars
Chicago Tribune	3/4 stars
Entertainment Weekly	C
Los Angeles Times	2.5/4 stars
NME	4/10
Q	4/5 stars
Rolling Stone	4/5 stars
Slant Magazine	4.5/5 stars
Spin Alternative Record Guide	8/10
Vox	7/10

In Rolling Stone, Anthony DeCurtis said that Natalie Merchant's lyrics reflect a "struggle between fervent hope and a kind of wide-eyed despair" and give Our Time in Eden "a provocative, unnerving power", and "the sonic allure of the Maniacs' music and Merchant's voice is a seduction into songs that are charged, complex and troubling." Steve Morse of The Boston Globe wrote that "these are some of [Merchant's] finest songs yet—intellectually challenging, lyrically brilliant and filled with intricate, dream-weaving melodies sparked by multi-instrumentalist Rob Buck (on guitars, sitar, banjo, pedal steel and mandocello)."

== Track listing ==
All songs written by Natalie Merchant, except as noted.

No.	Title	Writer(s)	Length
1.	"Noah's Dove"		4:29
2.	"These Are Days"	Robert Buck, Merchant	3:40
3.	"Eden"	Buck, Dennis Drew, Steven Gustafson, Jerome Augustyniak, Merchant	4:07
4.	"Few and Far Between"		3:13
5.	"Stockton Gala Days"	Buck, Drew, Gustafson, Augustyniak, Merchant	4:18
6.	"Gold Rush Brides"	Buck, Merchant	3:22
7.	"Jezebel"		4:00
8.	"How You've Grown"		3:39
9.	"Candy Everybody Wants"	Drew, Merchant	3:04
10.	"Tolerance"		4:13
11.	"Circle Dream"	Buck, Drew, Gustafson, Augustyniak, Merchant	3:25
12.	"If You Intend"		3:01
13.	"I'm Not the Man"		3:24

== Personnel ==
10,000 Maniacs

- Natalie Merchant – vocals, piano
- Robert Buck – electric and acoustic guitars, electric sitar, banjo, pedal and lap steel guitars, mandocello
- Dennis Drew – Hammond organ, piano, keyboards, accordion
- Steven Gustafson – bass guitar
- Jerome Augustyniak – drums, percussion

Additional musicians

- The J.B. horns – horns on "Few and Far Between" and "Candy Everybody Wants":
  - Maceo Parker – alto saxophone
  - Alfred "Pee Wee" Ellis – tenor saxophone
  - Fred Wesley – trombone
- Mary Ramsey – violin on "Stockton Gala Days", viola on "How You've Grown"
- Paulinho Da Costa – percussion on "These Are Days", "Candy Everybody Wants" and "Circle Dream"
- Charles Fleischer – harmonica on "Gold Rush Brides"
- Kim Laskowski – bassoon on "I'm Not the Man"
- Atsuko Sato – bassoon on "I'm Not the Man"

String quartet on "Jezebel"

- Larry Corbett – cello
- Bruce Dukov – violin
- Pamela Goldsmith – viola
- Ralph Morrison – violin

Technical

- Paul Fox – producer
- Ed Thacker – engineer, mixing
- Paul Buckmaster – string quartet arranger and conductor
- Michael Reiter – second engineer
- Scott Blockland – second engineer (mixing)
- Stephen Marcussen – mastering
- Rob Marinissen – photography
- Frank Olinsky – package design
- Natalie Merchant – package design

== Charts ==
=== Weekly charts ===
Chart (1992–1993)	Peak position
Canada Top Albums/CDs (RPM)	60
UK Albums (Official Charts)	33
US Billboard 200	28

=== Year-end charts ===
Chart (1993)	Position
US Billboard 200	57

== Certifications ==
Region	Certification	Certified units/sales
United States (RIAA)	2× Platinum	2,000,000^{^}
^{^} Shipments figures based on certification alone.
