= These Are Days =

1992 single by 10,000 Maniacs

Single by 10,000 Maniacs

from the album Our Time in Eden
- Released: August 31, 1992
- Studio: Bearsville (Bearsville, New York)
- Genre: Rock
- Length: 3:39
- Label: Elektra
- Songwriters: Robert Buck, Natalie Merchant
- Producer: Paul Fox

10,000 Maniacs singles chronology
"Poison in the Well" (1989)	"These Are Days" (1992)	"Candy Everybody Wants" (1993)

Music video
- "These Are Days" on YouTube

"These Are Days" is a song by alternative rock group 10,000 Maniacs, released as the lead single from their 1992 album, Our Time in Eden. The song reached No. 1 on the US Billboard Modern Rock Tracks chart in November 1992. They also performed the song for their 1993 album, MTV Unplugged, and it appears on their 2016 live album, Playing Favorites, with lead vocalist Mary Ramsey.

== Track listing ==
UK CD single
No.	Title	Writer(s)	Length
1.	"These Are Days"	Natalie Merchant, Robert Buck	3:39
2.	"Starman" (David Bowie cover)	Bowie	4:37
3.	"These Days" (Jackson Browne cover)	Browne	3:21

== Charts ==
=== Weekly charts ===
Chart (1992)	Peak position
Canada Top Singles (RPM)	35
Canada Adult Contemporary (RPM)	24
UK Singles (Official Charts)	58
US Billboard Hot 100	66
US Adult Contemporary (Billboard)	34
US Modern Rock Tracks (Billboard)	1

=== Year-end charts ===
Chart (1992)	Position
US Modern Rock Tracks (Billboard)	28

== Release history ==
Region	Date	Format(s)	Label(s)	Ref(s).
United Kingdom	August 31, 1992	7-inch vinyl; CD; cassette	Elektra	
Australia	February 14, 1993	CD; cassette	Elektra	

== See also ==
- List of Billboard Modern Rock Tracks number ones of the 1990s
