= Like the Weather =

Single by 10,000 Maniacs

from the album In My Tribe
- Released: January 1988
- Genre: Alternative rock
- Label: Elektra
- Songwriter(s): Natalie Merchant
- Producer(s): Peter Asher

10,000 Maniacs singles chronology
"'Peace Train'" (1987)	"Like the Weather" (1988)	"'What's the Matter Here'" (1988)

Music video
- "Like the Weather" by 10,000 Maniacs on YouTube

"Like the Weather" was the second single released from 10,000 Maniacs' 1987 album In My Tribe, following "Peace Train". A live version with lead vocalist Mary Ramsey was also included on their 2016 album Playing Favorites.

== Background and lyrics ==
"Like the Weather" was written by 10,000 Maniacs frontwoman and vocalist Natalie Merchant. Lyrically, the song, according to AllMusic's Liana Jones, "provides a rare instance where the band departs from addressing political and social issues to discuss the very primal human instinct to stay in bed due to the cruddy weather outside." Rolling Stone similarly described the song as "about, well, a really, really bad mood."

At a musical level, the song features an upbeat melody that contrasts with the dourness of the lyrics. Of this juxtaposition, 10,000 Maniacs bassist Steve Gustafson commented, "We liked to play toe-tapping music. Stuff you could dance to with a big beat. Her [Merchant's] view of the world was sometimes in stark contrast to that joy we got from playing. It made us unique. I think she is a fabulous lyricist."

== Release ==
"Like the Weather" was released as the third single from the band's 1987 album In My Tribe. The single became the band's breakthrough hit, reaching number 68 on the Billboard Hot 100 and number 37 on the Album Rock Tracks chart. It was the band's first single on both charts.

The single's release was accompanied by a music video directed by Adrian Edmondson. Rolling Stone described the video as "a shiny, happy video starring an adorably pouty Merchant."

== Reception ==
AllMusic's Jones spoke glowingly of the song, stating, "Next time when you rise for work in the morning and it's pouring outside, have a listen to 'Like the Weather.' The song won't make the sun come out, but it will put things in a lighter perspective and maybe even make stepping out the door a bit easier." The Post-Standard described the song as a "classic hit," while Rolling Stone praised the song's "buoyant" music.

Current 10,000 Maniacs vocalist Mary Ramsey, who replaced Merchant after she left the band in 1993, noted the song was one of the band's "must play" tracks in live performances, due to its popularity with fans.

== Charts ==
Chart (1988)	Peak position
US Billboard Hot 100	68
US Album Rock Tracks (Billboard)	37
