= Secrets of the I Ching =

Studio album by 10,000 Maniacs
- Released: 1983
- Recorded: March, July 1983
- Studios: Mr. Paradise Studios, State University of New York, Fredonia, New York
- Label: Mark Records
- Producers: Albert Garzon, 10,000 Maniacs

10,000 Maniacs chronology
Human Conflict Number Five (EP) (1982)	Secrets of the I Ching (1983)	The Wishing Chair (1985)

Singles from Secrets of the I Ching
- 1. "My Mother the War" Released: 1984

Professional ratings
Review scores
Source	Rating
AllMusic	2/5 stars
Robert Christgau	B−
The Encyclopedia of Popular Music	3/5 stars
Rolling Stone	3/5 stars
The Rolling Stone Album Guide	3/5 stars

Secrets of the I Ching is the first album by American alternative rock band 10,000 Maniacs (following their 1982 EP Human Conflict Number Five), released in 1983 by Mark Records. While the album also contained the band's own Christian Burial Music imprint, the label was fictitious.

Re-recorded versions of the songs "Tension" (as "Tension Makes a Tangle"), "Grey Victory", "Daktari" and "My Mother the War" later appeared on the band's 1985 album The Wishing Chair. The song "Tension" is a re-recording of a song that appeared on the band's Human Conflict Number Five.

All the tracks on the LP appear in remixed, remastered, and resequenced form on the 10,000 Maniacs compilation CD Hope Chest: The Fredonia Recordings 1982-1983 (1990).

== Background ==
Following the release of their debut EP Human Conflict Number Five, 10,000 Maniacs started several months of touring independent clubs and achieved a greater following after receiving airplay on college radio. The band returned to the studio in Spring 1983. Like Human Conflict Number Five, Secrets of the I Ching was recorded at State University of New York in Fredonia, and recording started the week of March 19, helmed by Albert Garzon, assisted by David Brick. Because the people in the band were not students of the university, they conducted sessions only in the evening. The album is the first of their recordings with drummer Jerome Augustyniak.

Like Human Conflict Number Five, the album bore the band's fictitious Christian Burial Music imprint, but was manufactured by Mark Records out of Clarence, New York. 2,000 copies were pressed, again funded by Dennis Drew's parents, but aided by Natalie Merchant, Dan Lombardo, Frank Scuettle, Dan Deutsch and Mark Grosso. Also like their previous EP, the album was reissued by Press Records in the U.S. and UK as well as by Normal Records in Germany.

In addition to garnering college radio airplay in the U.S., BBC Radio's DJ John Peel began playing "My Mother the War" in the UK, which led the band to tour there in 1984.

== Critical reception ==
Trouser Press wrote that the album "begins to bring some needed focus to the band’s warmly eccentric vision by concentrating on the folk-rock elements...the music ranges from screeching noise layered over a pop hook to almost psychedelic power calypso." MusicHound Rock: The Essential Album Guide called the album "sonically anemic." The Spin Alternative Record Guide wrote that "it's fun to hear [the band] try their chops on the hip genres of the day."

Robert Christgau of The Village Voice wrote "Not only does Natalie inflect the English language as if she grew up speaking some Polynesian tongue, but she writes lyrics to match, lyrics which from the crib sheet I'd adjudge the most sophomoric poetry-of-pretension to hit pop music since lysergic acid was in flower." In a 1994 interview with Q magazine, Merchant recalled this line from Christgau, saying "I'll inform you that I was only 17 years old, so it made a big impression on me – that I'd written the most pretentious lyrics since lysergic acid had been in flower. I was upset then but now I laugh about it because I've put Robert Christgau in perspective."

== Track listing ==
All lyrics by Natalie Merchant and music by John Lombardo, except where indicated.

Side one

1. "Grey Victory" (lyrics: Merchant; music: Lombardo, Rob Buck) – 3:07
2. "Pour de Chirico" – 3:09
3. "Death of Manolete" – 3:52
4. "Tension" – 3:30
5. "Daktari" (lyrics: Merchant, Lombardo; music: Lombardo) – 4:29

Side two

1. "Pit Viper" (lyrics: Merchant; music: Steven Gustafson) – 3:51
2. "Katrina's Fair" (lyrics: Merchant; music: Buck) – 2:57
3. "The Latin One" – 2:59
4. "National Education Week" (lyrics: Merchant; music: Dennis Drew) – 2:47
5. "My Mother the War" (lyrics: Merchant, Michael Walsh; music: Lombardo) – 3:32

The above track listing is for the original Mark Records pressing for Christian Burial Music, the band's own label. Subsequent editions of this album are missing "National Education Week".

== Personnel ==
10,000 Maniacs

- Robert Buck – principal guitars devices
- Natalie Merchant – voice
- Dennis Drew – organ, piano
- Steven Gustafson – bass guitar, guitar
- Jerome Augustyniak – percussion
- John Lombardo (as J.C. Lombardo) – guitar, bass guitar

Technical

- Albert Garzon – co-producer, engineer, mixing
- 10,000 Maniacs – co-producers
- David Brick – mixing
- Bob Grotke – mastering
- Natalie Merchant – package
- John Lombardo – package
- Gustav Doré – etching ("The Great Flood")

Subsequent releases omit Albert Garzon's name and credit David Brick with co-production and engineering.
