= Human Conflict Number Five =

EP by 10,000 Maniacs
- Released: 1982
- Recorded: February–March 1982
- Studio: State University of New York, Fredonia, New York
- Genre: Rock
- Length: 16:35
- Label: Mark Records
- Producer: 10,000 Maniacs, Bill Waldman

10,000 Maniacs chronology
Human Conflict Number Five (1982)	Secrets of the I Ching (1983)

Professional ratings
Review scores
Source	Rating
AllMusic	link
The Rolling Stone Album Guide	3/5 stars

Human Conflict Number Five is the debut EP by American alternative rock band 10,000 Maniacs, released in 1982 by Mark Records. While the EP also contained the band's own Christian Burial Music imprint, the label itself was fictitious.

Bar this version of "Tension", all the tracks on the EP appear in remixed, remastered and resequenced form on the 10,000 Maniacs compilation CD Hope Chest: The Fredonia Recordings 1982-1983 (1990).

== Background ==
10,000 Maniacs formed out of an artist cooperative in Jamestown that met in a rented warehouse called the Broadhead Mills, as well as at the Jamestown radio station WJWK. The band, who first performed under the name Still Life, performed their first gig as 10,000 Maniacs on Labor Day of 1981. The band's first composition was "Tension", which grew out of an English class assignment by singer Natalie Merchant.

The EP was recorded at State University of New York, Fredonia by Bill Waldman, and sessions commenced on Valentine's Day 1982, financed by keyboardist Dennis Drew's mother. The band's drummer during this period was Jim Foti, who played on the recordings.

While the band created their own fictitious record label, Christian Burial Music, a vanity label out of Clarence, New York called Mark Records actually manufactured the EP. 1,000 copies were pressed, funded by the parents of organist Dennis Drew. The EP was later reissued by Press Records in the US and UK, as well as Normal Records in Germany.

== Track listing ==
Side one

1. "Tension" (Natalie Merchant, John Lombardo) – 3:12
2. "Planned Obsolescence" (Dennis Drew, Merchant) – 5:15

Side two

1. "Orange" (Merchant, Lombardo) – 2:20
2. "Groove Dub" (Merchant, Lombardo) – 3:15
3. "Anthem for Doomed Youth" (Wilfred Owen, Lombardo) – 2:33

== Personnel ==
10,000 Maniacs

- Robert Buck (credited on US release as Norman Buck) – guitar, devices, synthesizer
- Dennis Drew – organ
- Steven Gustafson – guitar, bass guitar
- John Lombardo (credited on UK release as J.C. Lombardo) – guitar, bass guitar, odd vocals
- Natalie Merchant – voice
- Jim Foti – studio drums

Technical

- 10,000 Maniacs – co-producers
- Bill Waldman – co-producer
- Mary Van Houten – engineer
- Gina Tampio – engineer
- Bill Waldman – engineer
- Barry Placente – tape transfer
- J.C. Lombardo – cover design
- Natalie Merchant – cover design

The US and UK releases credit Robert Wachter and Jerry Augustyniak with drums, respectively, although neither played on these recordings.
