= Candy Everybody Wants =

Single by 10,000 Maniacs

from the album Our Time in Eden
- Released: 1993
- Studio: Bearsville (Bearsville, New York)
- Label: Elektra
- Songwriters: Dennis Drew, Natalie Merchant
- Producer: Paul Fox

10,000 Maniacs singles chronology
"These Are Days" (1992)	"Candy Everybody Wants" (1993)	"Few and Far Between" (1993)

Music video
- "Candy Everybody Wants" on YouTube

"Candy Everybody Wants" is the second single by American alternative rock group 10,000 Maniacs from their fifth album, Our Time in Eden (1992). The single was released in the U.K. 29 March 1993 by Elektra Records. It was written by Dennis Drew and Natalie Merchant, the band's keyboardist and lead singer respectively. Rolling Stone wrote that the song is about "the American appetite for televised sex and violence – and big business's willingness to satisfy that craving." The single also includes covers of Morrissey's "Everyday Is Like Sunday", "Sally Ann" (a traditional song first recorded by The Hill Billies), and R.E.M.'s "(Don't Go Back To) Rockville".

== Formats and track listings ==
- CD MAXI Single, US
1. "Candy Everybody Wants" (single remix) – 3:04
2. "Everyday Is Like Sunday" – 3:21
3. "Sally Ann" – 3:46
4. "(Don't Go Back To) Rockville" – 4:44
- Cassette Single, US
1. "Candy Everybody Wants" (single remix) – 3:04
2. "I Hope That I Don't Fall In Love With You" – 3:21

== Charts ==
Chart (1993)	Peak position
UK Singles (OCC)	47
UK Airplay (Music Week)	42
US Billboard Hot 100	67
US Alternative Airplay (Billboard)	5
