= What's the Matter Here =

1987 single by 10,000 Maniacs

"What's the Matter Here?"

Single by 10,000 Maniacs

from the album In My Tribe
- B-side: "Verdi Cries"
- Released: 1988
- Genre: Folk
- Songwriters: Natalie Merchant, Robert Buck
- Producer: Peter Asher

10,000 Maniacs singles chronology
"'Like the Weather'" (1988)	"What's the Matter Here?" (1988)	"'Trouble Me'" (1989)

Music video
- "What's the Matter Here" by 10,000 Maniacs on YouTube

"What's the Matter Here?" was the third single released from 10,000 Maniacs' 1987 album In My Tribe, following "Peace Train" and "Like the Weather." A live version with lead vocalist Mary Ramsey was also included on their 2016 album Playing Favorites.

The song continued the band's slow integration into the mainstream of American commercial radio; it was a number 9 hit on the Billboard Modern Rock Tracks chart in 1988 and reached the Billboard Hot 100 as well (the second single by the band to reach the latter chart, after "Like the Weather"). The song, as the rest of the album, was produced by Peter Asher (half of the duo Peter & Gordon, and producer of Linda Ronstadt and James Taylor). The song was written by Natalie Merchant and Robert Buck.

In the song, singer Natalie Merchant narrates the role of a woman who notices that her neighbors are abusing their young son, and struggles to balance her desire to speak up for the child with her feeling that she must not interfere in the family's affairs: "I'm tired of the excuses everybody uses/He's your kid, do as you see fit/But get this through that I don't approve of what you do to your own flesh and blood ... I want to say, "What's the matter here?"/But I don't dare say..."

== Track listings and formats ==
12" Vinyl - Elektra EKR 71T (UK)
No.	Title	Length
1.	"What's The Matter Here?" (LP Version)
2.	"Verdi Cries" (LP Version)
3.	"Like The Weather (Live)" (Live from the Einstein A-Go-Go, Jacksonville Beach, Florida, December 13, 1987)
4.	"Gun Shy (Live)" (Live from the Einstein A-Go-Go, Jacksonville Beach, Florida, December 13, 1987)
