= 10,000 Maniacs =

American alternative rock band

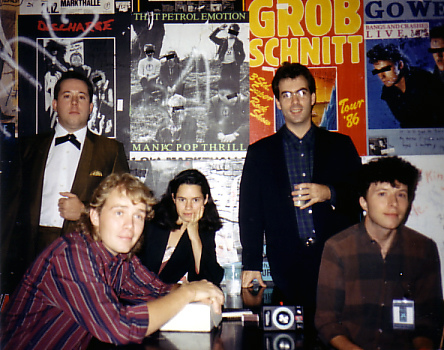
- 10,000 Maniacs c. 1987: Left to right: Rob Buck, Steve Gustafson, Natalie Merchant, Dennis Drew, and Jerry Augustyniak

Background information
- Origin: Jamestown, New York, U.S.
- Genres: Alternative rock, jangle pop, folk rock
- Years active: 1981–present
- Labels: Christian Burial, Elektra, Geffen, Bar/None, Cleopatra, Omnivore
- Members: Mary Ramsey; Dennis Drew; Steve Gustafson; Jerry Augustyniak; John Lombardo; Ben Medina
- Past members: Rob Buck; Jeff Erickson; Chet Cardinale; Terri Newhouse; Natalie Merchant; Tim Edborg; Jim Calavitta; Shawn Santos; Debbie Heverly; Duane Calhoun; Bob "O'Matic" Wachter; Jim Foti; Gerry Rattigan; Oskar Saville; Leigh Nash; Matt Slocum
- Website: maniacs.com

10,000 Maniacs is an American alternative rock band founded in 1981. They have released nine studio albums, six EPs, and five live albums. They achieved their most significant success between 1987 and 1993, when they released four albums that charted in the top 50 in the US: In My Tribe (1987), Blind Man's Zoo (1989), Our Time in Eden (1992), and the live album MTV Unplugged (1993). After the recording (but before the release) of MTV Unplugged, original lead singer and songwriter Natalie Merchant left the band to pursue a solo career, while the remaining members continued the band.

== History ==
=== Early years ===
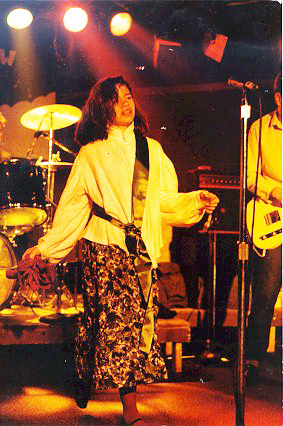
Natalie Merchant as lead singer in 1984

The band was formed as Still Life in 1981 in Jamestown, New York, by Dennis Drew (keyboards), Steven Gustafson (bass), Chet Cardinale (drums), Robert Buck (guitar), and Buck's ex-wife Terri Newhouse (vocals). Gustafson invited Natalie Merchant, who was 17 at the time, to do some vocals. John Lombardo, who was in a band named The Mills (along with brother guitarist/vocalists Mark Liuzzo and Paul Liuzzo and drummer Mike Young) and used to play occasionally with Still Life, was invited to join permanently on guitar and vocals. Newhouse and Cardinale left the band in July, and Merchant became the main singer. Various drummers came and left. The band changed its name to Burn Victims and then to 10,000 Maniacs, inspired by the 1964 low-budget horror movie Two Thousand Maniacs!.

They performed as 10,000 Maniacs for the first time on Labor Day, September 7, 1981, with a line-up of Merchant, Lombardo, Buck, Drew, Gustafson, and Tim Edborg on drums. Edborg left and Bob "Bob O Matic" Wachter was on drums for most of the 1981 gigs. Tired of playing cover songs—though their first notable American hit was a cover of the Cat Stevens hit "Peace Train"—the band started to write their own music, usually with Merchant handling the lyrics and Lombardo the music. In March 1982, with Jim Foti on drums, the band recorded an EP album titled Human Conflict Number Five, financed by Drew's mother. More gigs followed in 1982. During this time, they lived in Atlanta, Georgia, for a short period at the encouragement of friends who said that many gigs were available there. Discouraged by the lack of actual gigs, and by having to sell plasma and rake leaves to buy food, the band moved back to Jamestown in November 1982 to regroup.

John Lombardo

At the beginning of 1983, Jerry Augustyniak joined the band as their permanent drummer. The Maniacs met Augustyniak when they played in Buffalo, New York, where he was in a punk band named the Stains. Between March and July, the band recorded songs for a second record, Secrets of the I Ching, their debut album, which was pressed by Mark Records for the band's own label Christian Burial Music. The record was well received by critics and caught the attention of respected BBC Radio 1 DJ John Peel in London. One song, "My Mother the War", turned out to be a minor hit in the United Kingdom and entered the independent singles chart. The band toured extensively during 1983 and 1984, and played gigs in the UK.

Peter Leak, an Englishman living in New York City, became interested in the band, made contact and was made their manager. With the help of Leak and Elektra Records A & R (artists and repertoire) man Howard Thompson, 10,000 Maniacs signed to Elektra in November 1984. In the spring of 1985, they recorded their second album, The Wishing Chair, in London at Livingston Studios, with Joe Boyd as producer. Though the album was not a blockbuster hit, its status as the band's major label debut did win it some notice, and it received significant critical acclaim.

=== Breakthrough success ===
Frustrated with the lack of success and direction of the band, co-founder Lombardo left 10,000 Maniacs during a rehearsal on July 14, 1986. The remaining five members started recording a new album in Los Angeles with Peter Asher as the producer, who had worked extensively with artists such as James Taylor and Linda Ronstadt. In My Tribe, a more pop-rock oriented record, was released on July 7, 1987. The album stayed on the charts for 77 weeks, peaking at No. 37, and established a large U.S. audience for the group. It was also well received in the UK. The album originally contained the band's recording of "Peace Train", but the song was removed from some subsequent pressings (post-1989) after the song's writer Cat Stevens (now Yusuf Islam) made comments implying he agreed with a death fatwa against author Salman Rushdie.

10,000 Maniacs' next album, 1989's Blind Man's Zoo, hit No. 13 and went gold, further increasing the group's following. In May 1989, the British music magazine NME reported that 10,000 Maniacs had won the songwriter category prize at the New York Music Awards. In 1990, with the help of Lombardo, they remastered their first two records, Human Conflict Number Five and Secrets of the I Ching, and released them as a compilation titled Hope Chest: The Fredonia Recordings 1982–1983. Lombardo and Mary Ramsey, who had formed a folk-rock act named John & Mary, opened gigs for the Maniacs on the Hope Chest Tour in 1990.

The band played a handful of local concerts in 1991, but largely took a break from touring and Merchant spent most of the year working with homeless youth in Harlem. Merchant then revealed to the other members that she would be leaving 10,000 Maniacs for a solo career in two years' time, allowing for additional 10,000 Maniacs albums, while also acknowledging the financial implications of her departure. A new album, Our Time in Eden, was released on September 29, 1992. In 1993, the band performed at the MTV Inaugural Ball for President Clinton in January and on MTV Unplugged on April 21. Merchant made her departure from the band public in an interview on MTV on August 5, 1993, saying she "didn't want art by committee anymore." The MTV Unplugged album was released on October 26, 1993. "The last 10,000 Maniacs gig (July 28, 1993) was the first time I'd got drunk in nearly two years," Merchant later recalled. "I laughed a lot and threw lots of flowers out of the hotel window."

=== 1994–2001 ===
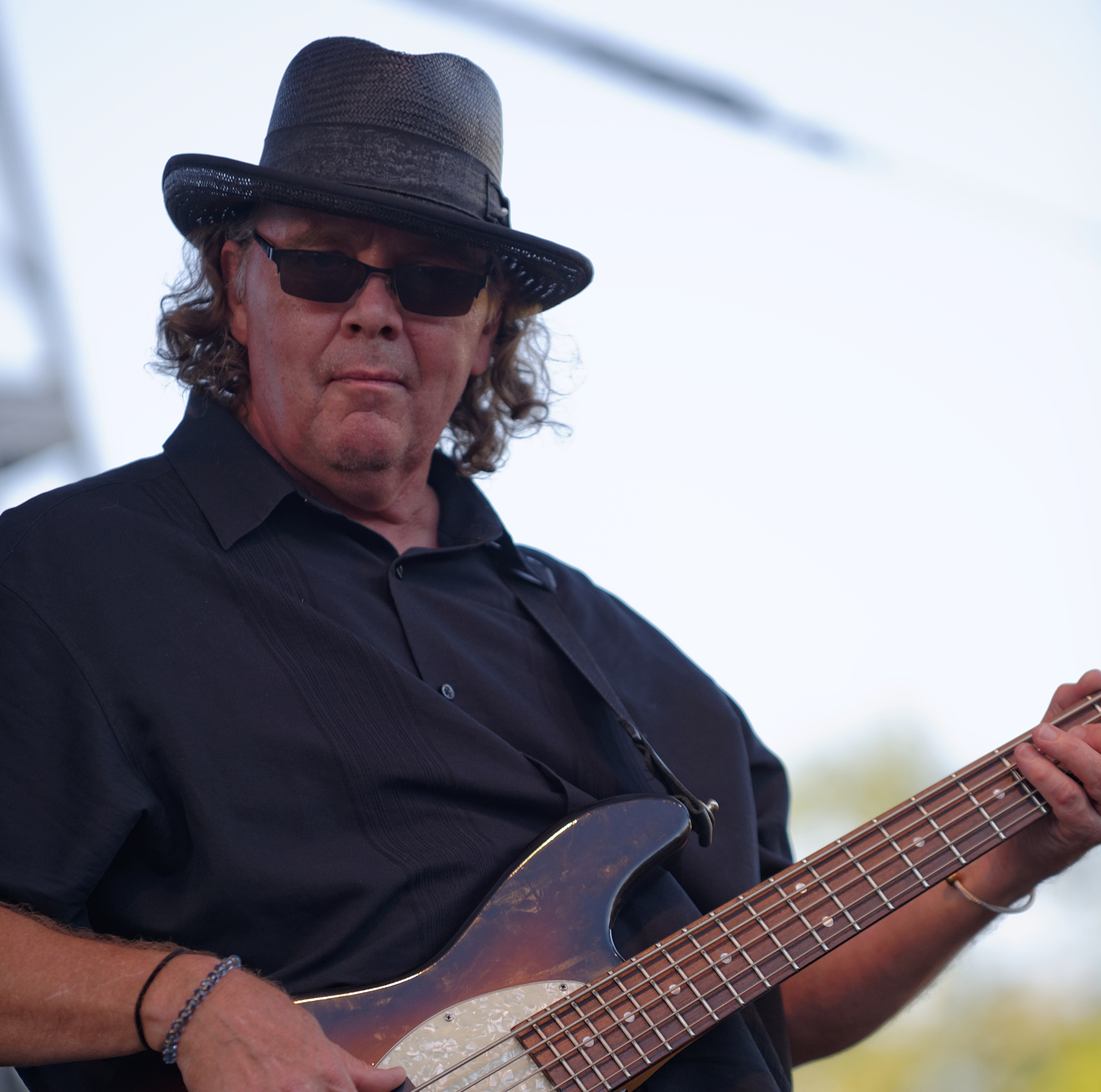
Steve Gustafson

After Merchant's departure, Elektra Records dropped the band while signing Merchant as a solo artist. The remaining members of 10,000 Maniacs (Augustyniak, Buck, Drew and Gustafson) asked John & Mary to join the band. The revamped band began performing new material almost immediately, initially calling themselves John & Mary, Rob, Steve, Dennis, & Jerry; then they were able to legally regain control of the 10,000 Maniacs name. 10,000 Maniacs released two albums with Ramsey on vocals. In 1997, they released Love Among the Ruins with the band on a new label, Geffen Records, from which their cover of the Roxy Music song "More Than This" became a moderate hit, and followed up in 1999 with The Earth Pressed Flat on Bar/None.

In December 1998, Buck took some time off from the band, moving to Texas to focus on a new project named League of Blind Women. 10,000 Maniacs recruited Buffalo-based Michael Lee Jackson of the band Animal Planet to step into the lead guitar role. Buck returned to the band in the summer of 1999. On November 3, 2000, 10,000 Maniacs played with the Buffalo Philharmonic Orchestra in Buffalo, New York. It was the last concert they performed with Buck. On December 19, 2000, Buck died of liver failure at the age of 42. He was buried in the Mission Covenant Church Cemetery in Sugar Grove, Pennsylvania.

Following Buck's death, 10,000 Maniacs took a break. Gustafson and Drew, with Jeff Erickson, started a band named The Mighty Wallop!. Augustyniak joined a band named Only Humen. On December 5, 2001, a 10,000 Maniacs line-up comprising Gustafson, Drew, Augustyniak, Lombardo and Ramsey played a benefit concert in Toronto, with Buck's former guitar technician, Erickson, on lead guitar.

=== 2002–2007 ===
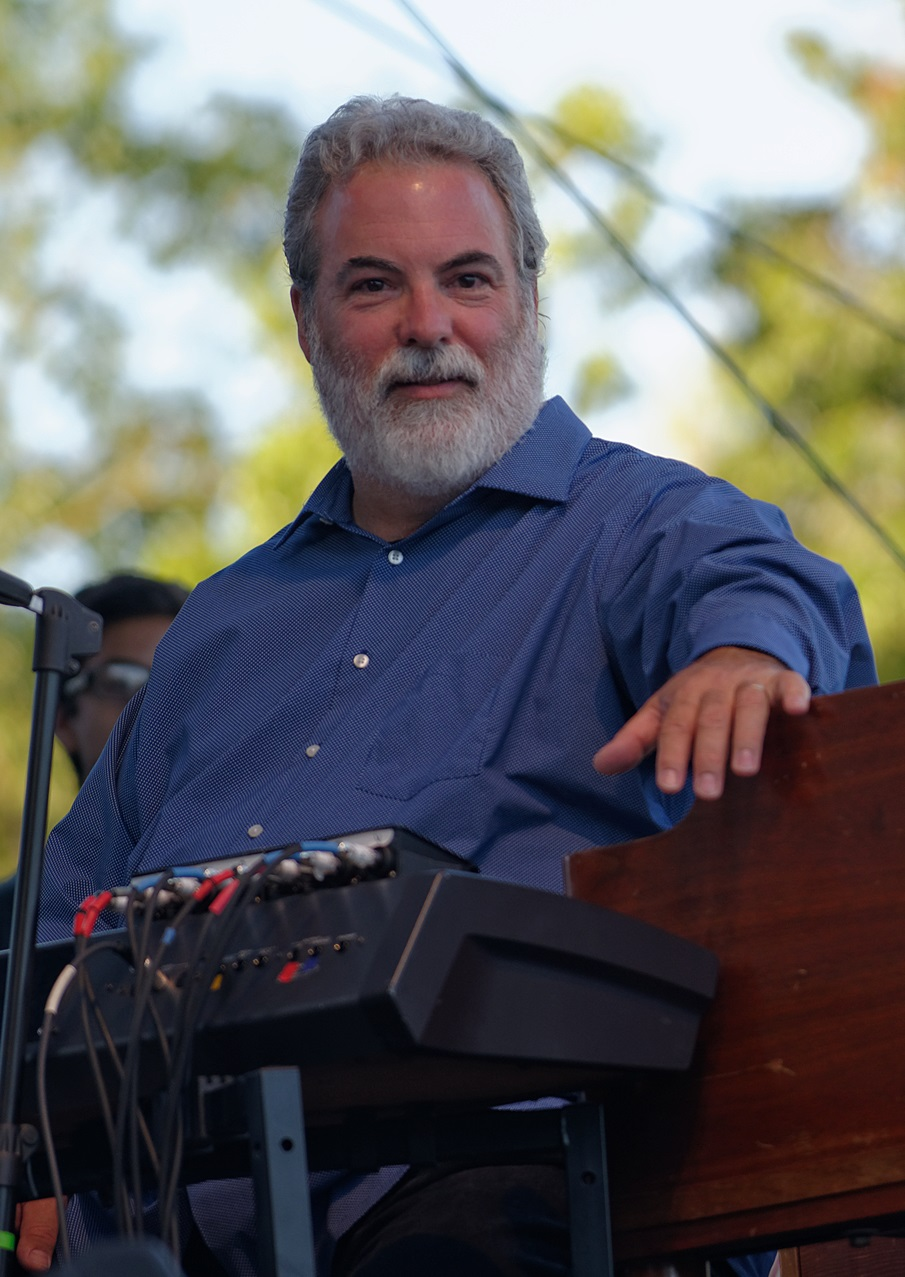
Dennis Drew

In 2002, Gustafson, Drew, and Augustyniak decided that they wished to continue 10,000 Maniacs with a new lead singer. Lombardo showed up at the first band practice, found out that the band had hired Erickson to play lead guitar and Oskar Saville of the Chicago-based band Rubygrass to sing, and quit the band. This lineup toured sporadically between 2002 and 2006, playing at various festivals.

On January 27, 2004, Elektra/Asylum/Rhino Records released Campfire Songs: The Popular, Obscure and Unknown Recordings, a two-CD set compilation, with 31 digitally remastered songs, four of them demos and one unreleased. The second disc contained B-sides and outtakes throughout the band's career up to that point, including many covers. Jackson Browne's "These Days" and Tom Waits' "I Hope That I Don't Fall in Love with You" were among those included.

In 2006, John & Mary formed a folk-rock band named the Valkyries. John & Mary & the Valkyries are composed of several longtime Buffalo music scene stalwarts. Ramsey rejoined the current edition of the band for several dates in 2006, playing viola and singing backing vocals. Saville left in 2007, and Ramsey regained the lead vocalist spot.

=== 2008–2022 ===
10,000 Maniacs in 2019 in Rochester, Minnesota

The band—consisting of Augustyniak, Drew, Erickson, Gustafson and Ramsey—remains active, playing shows throughout the United States. In June 2011, the band released the EP Triangles on its own label, Ruby Wristwatch Records. The band celebrated its 30th anniversary in October 2011 with two sold-out concerts at the Scharmann Theater on the campus of Jamestown Community College. The band spent most of 2012 recording a new album at their studio in Jamestown, New York. In February 2013, they released the album, titled Music from the Motion Picture.

Former drummer Robert Wachter died on March 26, 2013, at the age of 49 due to a long illness.

Twice Told Tales, an album of traditional British Isles covers, was released on April 28, 2015, on Cleopatra Records. Founding member John Lombardo was brought back into the fold as creative director and to play guitar on the album and following tour. 10,000 Maniacs released its live album Playing Favorites on June 3, 2016, their first live album with Mary Ramsey on lead vocals.

=== 40th anniversary ===
The band celebrated their 40th anniversary in 2022 with an extensive tour, billed as 10,000 Maniacs featuring Mary Ramsey, to avoid any confusion as to the status of Natalie Merchant in the band. Ramsey acknowledged the legacy of the band, and the band with Merchant, stating "There are still times when I get mistaken for her, and I feel like it's just part of the story. In the beginning it was different, because people obviously wanted to see her — that's an understandable situation. But time has healed things up a bit, the wounds and the expectations." In 2014, Merchant looked back to her time with the band, "I learned so much with 10,000 Maniacs and have great memories being with that band. I'll never forget 1987 when it became so crazy. It was exciting and insane in terms of the schedule. It was so intense I was hospitalized. I look back fondly on that period. But I don't think the world is craving Natalie Merchant and 10,000 Maniacs." In 2002, when Merchant was asked if she would ever get back together with the band for a tour, she stated that due to Buck's death they could never again play together as a band.

Keyboardist Dennis Drew reflected on the 40-year history of the band, "You don't grow up thinking you're going to do anything for 40 years. To get to this point, it's amazing. It doesn't feel like 40 years. It's been as natural as everything else. We have families, kids and grand-kids on the way. It's just been our life. You don't retire from this, I don't think. They'll have to take us off the stage on stretchers."

=== 2023–present ===
In July 2023, 10,000 Maniacs announced that Mary Ramsey and Jeff Erickson would be leaving the band to pursue other interests, and Leigh Nash would be joining the band as their new lead singer. 10,000 Maniacs also announced that Matt Slocum would be joining the band as their new guitarist. Both Nash and Slocum are founding members of the band Sixpence None the Richer.

In January 2024, 10,000 Maniacs announced on their Facebook page that Nash and Slocum had left to devote time to Sixpence None the Richer, and that Ramsey had returned as lead singer, with guitarist Joe Rozler also joining the group. In April 2024 it was announced that Illinois-based musician, Ben Medina, will be joining on lead guitar.

== Band members ==
Current

- Mary Ramsey – lead vocals, violin, viola (1993–2001, 2007–2023, 2024–present)
- Dennis Drew – keyboards, backing and rare occasional lead vocals (1981–present)
- Steve Gustafson – bass, guitar, backing and rare occasional lead vocals (1981–present)
- John Lombardo – guitar, bass, backing and lead vocals (1981–1986, 1994–2002, 2015–present, touring member other years)
- Jerry Augustyniak – drums, backing vocals (1983–present)
- Ben Medina - lead guitar (2024-present)

Former

- Rob Buck – guitar, synthesizers, mandolin, pedal steel, sitar, banjo, mandocello (1981–1998, 1999–2000; his death)
- Chet Cardinale – drums (1981)
- Teri Newhouse - vocals (1981)
- Natalie Merchant – lead vocals, piano (1981–1993)
- Tim Edborg – drums (1981)
- James Rocky Calavitta – saxophone (1981)
- Debbie Heverly – piano (1981)
- Duane Calhoun – lead guitar (1981)
- Bob "O'Matic" Wachter – drums (1982; died 2013)
- Jim Foti – drums (1982–1983)
- Jeff Erickson – guitar, backing and occasional lead vocals (2001–2023, guest appearance in 1998)
- Oskar Saville – lead vocals (2002–2007)
- Leigh Nash – lead vocals (2023)
- Matt Slocum – guitar (2023)

Touring Associate artists

- Ben Medina – lead guitar (2024-Present)
- Joe Rozler – guitar, keyboards, vocals (2024)
- Sally Schaefer – acoustic guitar, backing vocals, violin, mandolin (2023)
- Maggie Zindle – violin, viola, backing vocals (2018–2023, 2025)
- Morgan Fichter – violin, backing vocals (1992–1993)
- Amanda Kramer – piano, acoustic guitar, backing vocals (1992–1993)
- Michael Lee Jackson – lead guitar (1998–1999)
- Max Weinberg – drums (1992)
- Kevin Osborne – trombone (1992–1993)
- Tommy LaBella – alto saxophone (1992–1993, 2013–2019)
- Tony White – tenor saxophone, horn arranger (1992–1993, 2002–2003, 2013–2019)
- Scott Burrows – trombone (1993)
- Levi E. Swanson – lead trombone (2003–2008)
- Andrew Ferguson - alto saxophone (2004–2005)
- Maria Sebastian – acoustic guitar, backing vocals (2010–2011)
- Melanie Luciano – acoustic guitar, backing vocals (2012–2014, 2015, 2020)
- Savannah King – acoustic guitar, backing vocals (2014–2015)
- Amanda Barton – acoustic guitar, backing vocals, violin, tambourine (2015–2016)
- Inga Yanoski – viola, violin, backing vocals (2016–2018)
- Noelle Hone – backing vocals (2006, 2018)

Jeff Erickson of 10,000 Maniacs in 2019

== Discography ==
=== Albums ===
==== Studio albums ====
Year	Album details	Peak chart positions			Certifications (sales thresholds)
Year	Album details	US	AUS	UK	Certifications (sales thresholds)
1983	Secrets of the I Ching	—	—	—	
1985	The Wishing Chair	—	—	—	BPI: Silver
1987	In My Tribe	37	—	—	RIAA: 2× Platinum; BPI: Silver
1989	Blind Man's Zoo	13	84	18	RIAA: Platinum; BPI: Silver
1992	Our Time in Eden	28	171	33	RIAA: 2× Platinum
1997	Love Among the Ruins	104	200	—	
1999	The Earth Pressed Flat	—	—	—	
2013	Music from the Motion Picture	—	—	—	
2015	Twice Told Tales	—	—	—	

==== Extended plays ====
- Human Conflict Number Five (1982)
- You Happy Puppet (1989)
- Candy Everybody Wants (1993)
- Few & Far Between (1993)
- Triangles (2011)
- For Crying Out Loud (2016)

==== Live ====
Year	Album details	Peak chart positions			Certifications (sales thresholds)
Year	Album details	US	AUS	UK	Certifications (sales thresholds)
1993	MTV Unplugged	13	190	40	RIAA: 3× Platinum
2006	Live Twenty-Five	—	—	—	
2009	Extended Versions	—	—	—	
2016	Playing Favorites	—	—	—	
2017	Live at the Belly Up	—	—	—	

==== Compilations ====
Year	Album	Notes
1990	Hope Chest: The Fredonia Recordings 1982–1983	
1994	The Unplugged Collection, Volume One	
2004	Campfire Songs: The Popular, Obscure and Unknown Recordings	AUS No. 337, UK No. 192

=== Singles ===
Year	Single	Peak chart positions							Album
Year	Single	US	US Alt	US Main	US AC	AUS	CAN	UK	Album
1984	"My Mother the War"	—	—	—	—	—	—	—	Secrets of the I Ching
1985	"Can't Ignore the Train"	—	—	—	—	—	—	—	The Wishing Chair
1985	"Scorpio Rising"	—	—	—	—	—	—	—	The Wishing Chair
1985	"Just as the Tide was a Flowing"	—	—	—	—	—	—	—	The Wishing Chair
1987	"Don't Talk"	—	—	—	—	—	—	—	In My Tribe
1987	"Peace Train"	—	—	—	—	—	—	—	In My Tribe
1988	"Like the Weather"	68	—	37	—	—	—	—	In My Tribe
1988	"What's the Matter Here?"	80	9	—	—	—	—	—	In My Tribe
1989	"Trouble Me"	44	3	20	7	102	31	77	Blind Man's Zoo
1989	"Eat for Two"	—	12	—	—	—	—	93	Blind Man's Zoo
1989	"You Happy Puppet"	—	—	—	—	—	—	—	Blind Man's Zoo
1989	"Poison in the Well"	—	—	—	—	—	—	—	Blind Man's Zoo
1992	"These Are Days"	66	1	—	34	151	35	58	Our Time in Eden
1992	"Candy Everybody Wants"	67	5	—	—	174	71	47	Our Time in Eden
1992	"Eden"	—	—	—	—	—	—	—	Our Time in Eden
1993	"Few and Far Between"	95	—	—	—	—	—	—	Our Time in Eden
1993	"Everyday Is Like Sunday"	—	22	—	—	—	—	—	Candy Everybody Wants
1993	"Because the Night"	11	7	—	9	190	10	65	MTV Unplugged
1997	"More Than This"	25	—	—	—	94	11	87	Love Among the Ruins
1997	"Rainy Day"	—	—	—	—	—	—	—	Love Among the Ruins
1999	"Beyond the Blue"	—	—	—	—	—	—	—	The Earth Pressed Flat
"—" denotes releases that did not chart

=== Other releases ===
Year	Title	Notes
2000	"(I'm Always Touched by Your) Presence, Dear"	Digital download provided through Reciprocal for $1.50. Studio cover version of a Blondie song from around 1995.
2000	"Rainy Day" (live)	Digital download provided through Reciprocal for $1.50. Live acoustic performance from Fredonia Opera House in 1998.
2000	"Stockton Gala Days" (live)	Digital download provided through Reciprocal for $1.50. Live acoustic performance from Fredonia Opera House in 1998.
2000	"Rainy Day" (live)	Digital download provided through Reciprocal for $1.50. Live acoustic performance from Fredonia Opera House in 1998.
2013	"Sweetest Gift"	Digital download provided through PledgeMusic to those who supported the pledge for Music from the Motion Picture. The song was recorded for the album but was not included.
2013	Music from the Motion Picture Alternate Mixes	Digital download provided through PledgeMusic during the drive to support Music from the Motion Picture for $45. All songs from the original album provided with alternate mixes.
2013	Music from the Motion Picture Sing-A-Long Mixes	Digital download provided through PledgeMusic during the drive to support Music from the Motion Picture for $30. All songs from the original album except for "Chautauqua Moon" provided in a karaoke format with limited backing vocals.
2015	Twice Told Tales Alt/Early Mixes/Takes	Digital download provided through PledgeMusic during the drive to support Twice Told Tales exclusively available in the producer package. All songs from the original album except for "Lady Mary Ramsey", "The Song of Wandering Aengus", "Bonny May", "Greenwood Sidey", and "Lady Mary Ramsay II."

== Filmography ==
=== Television ===
Year	Title	Performer	Notes
1985	The Tube	10,000 Maniacs	Performed "Can't Ignore the Train" and "My Mother the War"
1985	Music Convoy	10,000 Maniacs	Mimed "Grey Victory"
1987	The Tonight Show Starring Johnny Carson	10,000 Maniacs	Performed "Peace Train" and "Don't Talk"
1987	Late Night with David Letterman	Natalie Merchant and Rob Buck	Performed "Don't Talk" with the house band; this version of the song has some alternate lyrics at the end
1988	Saturday Night Live	10,000 Maniacs	Aired February 27, 1988; performed "Peace Train" and "What's The Matter Here?"
1988	Wired	10,000 Maniacs	
1988	The White Room	10,000 Maniacs	Performed "Don't Talk" and "Like the Weather"
1989	MTV Unplugged	10,000 Maniacs	First appearance
1989	The Big Al Show	10,000 Maniacs	Performed "Headstrong"
1989	The Arsenio Hall Show	10,000 Maniacs	Performed "Eat For Two" and "Poison in the Well"
1989	Late Night with David Letterman	Natalie Merchant and Rob Buck	Performed "Trouble Me" with the house band
1989	The Tonight Show Starring Johnny Carson	10,000 Maniacs	Guest Host: Jay Leno; performed "Trouble Me" and "Eat For Two"
1989	One Hour With Jonathan Ross	Natalie Merchant	Performed "Verdi Cries"
1990	The Word	10,000 Maniacs	Performed "The Latin One"
1990	Earth Day Rally	10,000 Maniacs (minus Dennis Drew)	Performed "What's the Matter Here?", "Dust Bowl" and "A Campfire Song" (with Michael Stipe); Merchant later performed "Get Together" with The Indigo Girls, Woody Harrelson and Stipe
1992	Saturday Night Live	10,000 Maniacs	Aired October 31, 1992; performed "These Are Days" and "Candy Everybody Wants"
1992	Late Night with David Letterman	Natalie Merchant, Rob Buck and Dennis Drew	Aired November 19, 1992; performed "Few and Far Between" with the house band
1992	The Tonight Show with Jay Leno	10,000 Maniacs	Performed "These Are Days"
1992	Live with Regis and Kathie Lee	10,000 Maniacs	Performed "How You've Grown"
1992/1993	MTV Drops the Ball	10,000 Maniacs	Performed "These Are Days" and "Candy Everybody Wants"
1993	MTV Unplugged	10,000 Maniacs	First artist to make second appearance
1993	The Arsenio Hall Show	10,000 Maniacs	
1993	The Tonight Show with Jay Leno	10,000 Maniacs	Performed "Candy Everybody Wants" and "How You've Grown"
1993	Late Night with David Letterman	10,000 Maniacs	Performed "Stockton Gala Days"
1993	Rock and Roll Inaugural Ball	10,000 Maniacs	Performed "These Are Days", "Candy Everybody Wants" (with Michael Stipe) and "To Sir With Love" (with Stipe)
1993	The Today Show	10,000 Maniacs	
1993	Late Show with David Letterman	Natalie Merchant and Rob Buck	Performed "Because the Night"; introduced as Natalie Merchant as she had already left the band
1997	Showbiz Today	10,000 Maniacs	Performed "Rainy Day", "Even With My Eyes Closed", "Big Star" and "More Than This"
1997	Live with Regis and Kathie Lee	10,000 Maniacs	Performed "More Than This"
1997	Sabrina, the Teenage Witch (1996 TV series)	10,000 Maniacs	Performed "Rainy Day" on the episode "A River of Candy Corn Runs Through It"
1997	The RuPaul Show	10,000 Maniacs	Performed "Rainy Day"
2014	Indy Style TV	10,000 Maniacs	Performed "More Than This" and "These Are Days"
2015	WGN 9 News	10,000 Maniacs	Performed "Canadee-I-O", "Lady Mary Ramsey" and "More Than This"
2015	Talk of the Town	Mary Ramsey, Savannah King and Joey Molland	Performed "Sweet Tuesday Morning"
2015	Talk of the Town	10,000 Maniacs	May 7
2015	AM Buffalo	John Lombardo and Mary Ramsey	Performed "Canadee-I-O"
