= Jerry Augustyniak =

American drummer (b. 1958)

Jerome Augustyniak
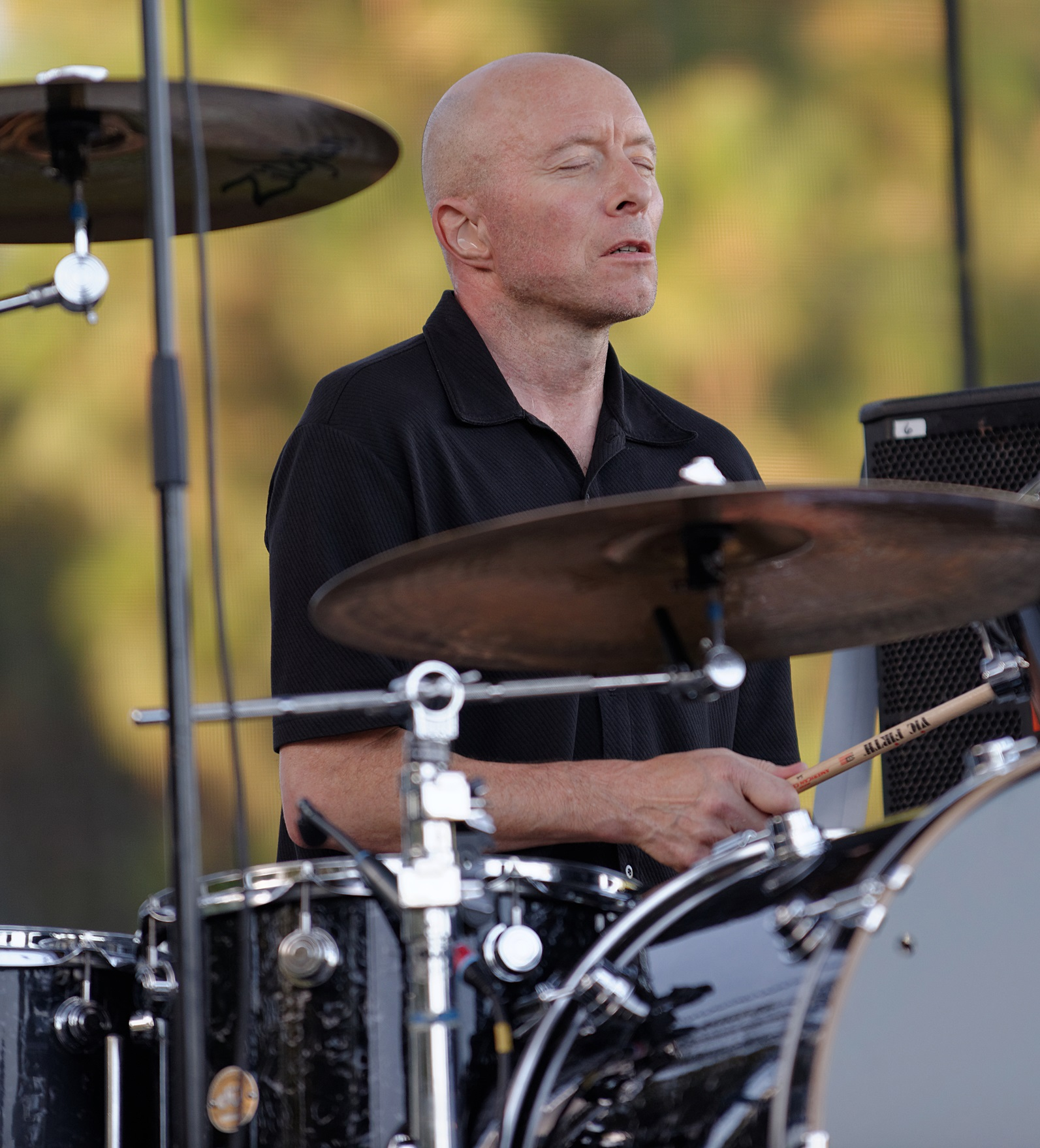
- Augustyniak performing in 2015

Background information
- Born: September 2, 1958 (age 67); Sloan, New York
- Genres: Rock, alternative rock
- Occupation: Musician
- Instrument: Drums
- Years active: 1983–present
- Member of: 10,000 Maniacs

Jerome Stanley Augustyniak (born September 2, 1958) is the drummer for the American alternative rock band 10,000 Maniacs. Augustyniak joined the band in March 1983, two years after the group formed. Augustyniak continues to perform with the band who tour extensively. As a member of 10,000 Maniacs, he is also a member of the Buffalo Music Hall of Fame.

== Discography ==
With 10,000 Maniacs

- Secrets of the I Ching (1983)
- The Wishing Chair (1985)
- In My Tribe (1987)
- Blind Man's Zoo (1989)
- Hope Chest: The Fredonia Recordings 1982-1983 (1990)
- Our Time in Eden (1992)
- MTV Unplugged (1993)
- Love Among the Ruins (1997)
- The Earth Pressed Flat (1999)
- Campfire Songs: The Popular, Obscure and Unknown Recordings (2004)
- Live Twenty-Five (2006)
- Extended Versions (2009)
- Triangles (EP) (2011)
- Music From The Motion Picture (2013)
- Twice Told Tales (2015)
- For Crying Out Loud (EP) (2016)
- Playing Favorites (2016)
- Live at the Belly Up (2017)

== Other credits ==
- Victory Gardens (1991) with John & Mary - drums
- The Weedkiller's Daughter (1993) with John & Mary - drums
- The Pinwheel Galaxy (2003) with John & Mary – drums, percussion
- Peace Bridge (2007) with John & Mary – drums
