= Dennis Drew =

American keyboardist (born 1957)

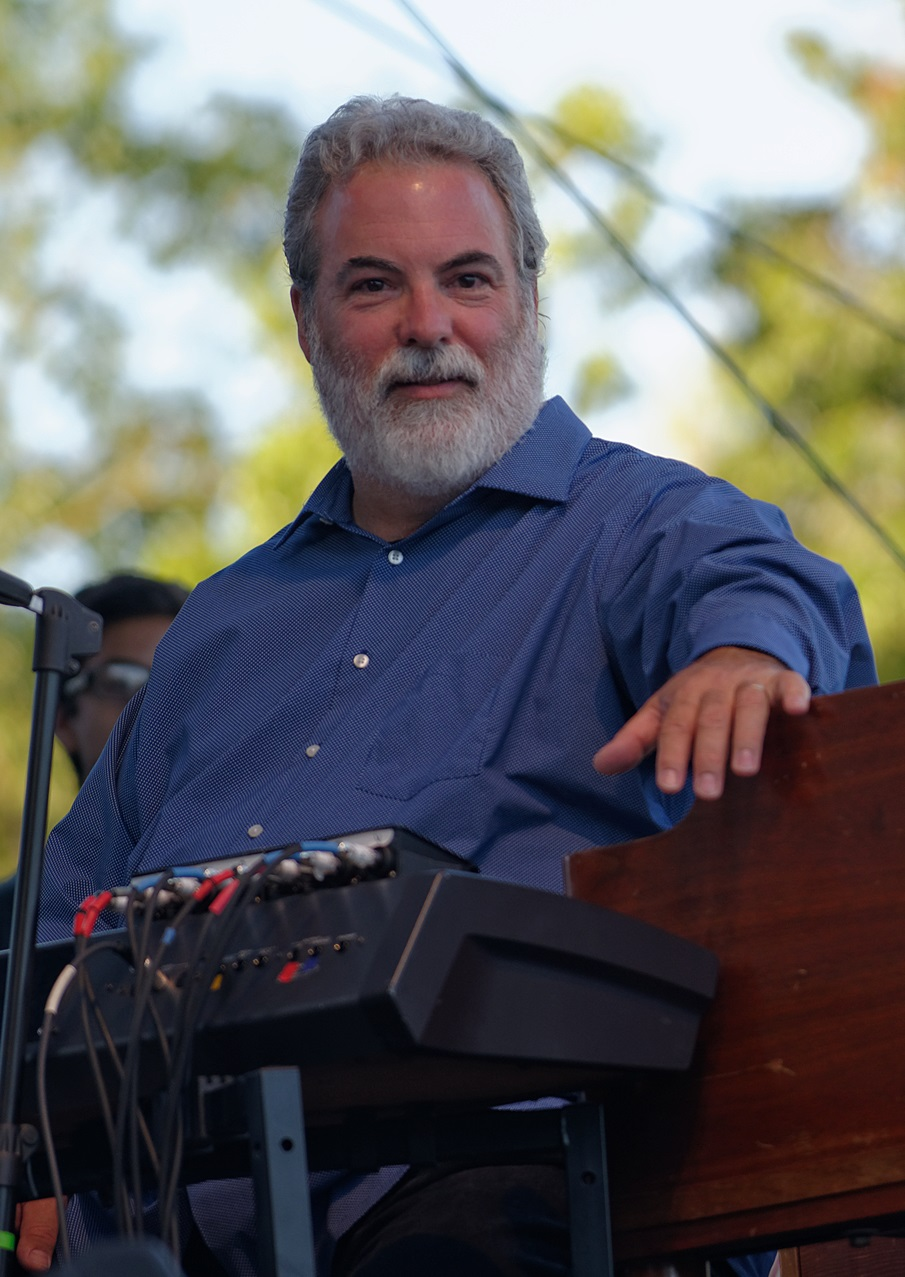
- Drew performing with 10,000 Maniacs at Pittsford Park in Lake Forest in 2015

Background information
- Born: Dennis Arnold Drew; August 8, 1957 (age 69); Jamestown, New York, U.S.
- Genres: Rock, alternative rock
- Occupation: Musician
- Instrument: keyboards
- Years active: 1981–present

Dennis Arnold Drew (born August 8, 1957) is the keyboardist for the American alternative rock band 10,000 Maniacs. He has been with the band since its inception in 1981 and is one of three founding members along with Steve Gustafson and John Lombardo in the current band lineup. Drew also spent 17 years (2004–2021) as the general manager of WRFA-LP, a community radio station in Jamestown, New York. He previously had a stint at WNAE-AM in nearby city Warren, Pennsylvania, before the band's beginning.

== Discography ==
With 10,000 Maniacs

- Human Conflict Number Five (EP) (1982)
- Secrets of the I Ching (1983)
- The Wishing Chair (1985)
- In My Tribe (1987)
- Blind Man's Zoo (1989)
- Hope Chest: The Fredonia Recordings 1982-1983 (1990)
- Our Time in Eden (1992)
- MTV Unplugged (1993)
- Love Among the Ruins (1997)
- The Earth Pressed Flat (1999)
- Campfire Songs: The Popular, Obscure and Unknown Recordings (2004)
- Live Twenty-Five (2006)
- Extended Versions (2009)
- Triangles (EP) (2011)
- Music From The Motion Picture (2013)
- Twice Told Tales (2015)
- For Crying Out Loud (EP) (2016)
- Playing Favorites (2016)
- Live at the Belly Up (2017)
