= In My Tribe =

1987 studio album by 10,000 Maniacs

- Standard CD artwork

Studio album by 10,000 Maniacs
- Released: July 27, 1987
- Recorded: March–April 1987
- Studio: The Complex, Los Angeles
- Genre: Alternative rock; jangle pop; folk rock; college rock
- Length: 46:51
- Label: Elektra
- Producer: Peter Asher

10,000 Maniacs chronology
The Wishing Chair (1985)	In My Tribe (1987)	Blind Man's Zoo (1989)

Singles from In My Tribe
- 1. "Don't Talk" Released: 1987; 2. "Peace Train" Released: 1987; 3. "Like the Weather" Released: January 1988; 4. "What's the Matter Here" Released: 1988

In My Tribe is the third studio album from the American alternative rock band 10,000 Maniacs. Released on July 27, 1987, by Elektra Records, it was their second major-label album and their first to achieve large-scale success. John Lombardo, Natalie Merchant's songwriting partner on previous albums, had left the band in 1986, and In My Tribe saw Merchant begin to collaborate with the other members of the band, most notably with Rob Buck.

== Artwork ==
The front cover of the CD edition, designed by Kosh, is a black-and-white photograph of children with bows and arrows in an archery class, a theme used by record and cassette editions with different covers.

== Reception ==
Professional ratings
Review scores
Source	Rating
AllMusic	4.5/5 stars
Los Angeles Times	3/4 stars
The Rolling Stone Album Guide	4/5 stars
Spin Alternative Record Guide	8/10
The Village Voice	B−

In a contemporary review, Rolling Stone's J. D. Considine wrote that "with In My Tribe, the group has finally come into maturity. It isn't simply that the songs are richer and more resonant this time around; the band itself seems to have grown." In 1989, Rolling Stone ranked the album number sixty-five on their list of the 100 greatest albums of the 1980s, summing it up as "a poetic, heartfelt message about social concerns such as alcoholism, child abuse and illiteracy." Robert Hilburn of the Los Angeles Times largely praised the album, in particular Peter Asher's production, which he felt made the band "more forceful and accessible" and brought Merchant's vocals to the foreground. While he also felt the band were recycling musical ideas from departed guitarist John Lombardo, he stated that "the advances in Merchant's singing and lyrics—both are more intimate and assured—help offset the problems of over-familiarity." Robert Christgau of The Village Voice was critical of Merchant's "nasal art-folk drawl", but added that "by deprivatizing her metaphors, she actually says something about illiteracy, today's army, and cruelty to children."

In a retrospective review, AllMusic reviewer Chris Woodstra wrote that "the album proves powerful not for the ideas [...] but rather for the graceful execution and pure listenability."

== "Peace Train" controversy ==
In 1989, the band's recording of Cat Stevens' "Peace Train" was removed from the U.S. CD and cassette versions of the album, after comments made by Stevens (by then a Muslim convert, known as Yusuf Islam) that were supportive of the fatwa on Salman Rushdie. The song remained on copies released outside the United States. It was later included on the band's 2-CD compilation Campfire Songs: The Popular, Obscure and Unknown Recordings, released on January 24, 2004 by Elektra/Asylum/Rhino Records.

== Track listing ==
All songs written by Natalie Merchant, except where noted.

Side one

1. "What's the Matter Here?" (Robert Buck, Merchant) – 4:51
2. "Hey Jack Kerouac" (Buck, Merchant) – 3:26
3. "Like the Weather" – 3:56
4. "Cherry Tree" (Buck, Merchant) – 3:13
5. "The Painted Desert" (Jerome Augustyniak, Merchant) – 3:39
6. "Don't Talk" (Dennis Drew, Merchant) – 5:04

Side two

1. "Peace Train" (Cat Stevens) – 3:26
  Omitted from later US CD and digital releases
2. "Gun Shy" – 4:11
3. "My Sister Rose" (Augustyniak, Merchant) – 3:12
4. "A Campfire Song" – 3:15
5. "City of Angels" (Buck, Merchant) – 4:17
6. "Verdi Cries" – 4:27

== Personnel ==
10,000 Maniacs

- Natalie Merchant – voice
- Robert Buck – guitars, mandolin, pedal steel guitar
- Dennis Drew – keyboards
- Steve Gustafson – bass guitar
- Jerome Augustyniak – drums, percussion

Additional musicians

- Michael Stipe – other voice on "A Campfire Song"
- Don Grolnick – piano on "Verdi Cries"
- Dennis Karmazyn – cello on "Verdi Cries"
- Novi Novog – viola on "Verdi Cries"
- Bob Magnusson – double bass on "Verdi Cries"
- David Campbell – viola & string arrangement on "Verdi Cries"

Technical

- Peter Asher – producer
- George Massenburg – engineer, mixing
- Frank Wolf – mixing
- Sharon Rice – additional engineering
- Shep Lonsdale – assistant engineer
- Duane Seykora – assistant engineer
- Mike Reese – mastering
- Doug Sax – mastering
- Edd Kolakowski – production assistant
- Kosh – design, art direction
- Todd Eberle – portraits of menfolk
- Kris Nielson – portrait of Natalie

== Charts ==
=== Weekly charts ===
Chart (1987–1988)	Peak position
US Billboard 200	37

=== Year-end charts ===
Chart (1988)	Position
US Billboard 200	48

=== Singles ===
Year	Single	Chart	Position
1988	"Like the Weather"	Billboard Mainstream Rock Tracks	37
1988	"Like the Weather"	Billboard Hot 100	68
1988	"What's the Matter Here?"	Billboard Hot 100	80
1988	"What's the Matter Here?"	Billboard Modern Rock Tracks	9

== Certifications ==
Certifications for In My Tribe
Region	Certification	Certified units/sales
United States (RIAA)	2× Platinum	2,000,000^{^}
^{^} Shipments figures based on certification alone.
