= Rob Buck =

American musician (1958–2000)

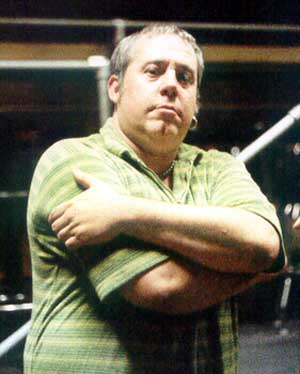
- Buck in 1997

Background information
- Born: Robert Norman Buck; August 1, 1958; Chandlers Valley, Pennsylvania, U.S.
- Died: December 19, 2000 (aged 42) Pittsburgh, Pennsylvania, U.S.
- Genres: Rock, alternative rock
- Occupations: Musician, songwriter
- Instrument: Guitar
- Years active: 1981–2000
- Formerly of: 10,000 Maniacs

Robert Norman Buck (August 1, 1958 – December 19, 2000) was an American guitarist and founding member of the alternative rock band 10,000 Maniacs. Buck co-wrote some of the most successful songs recorded by 10,000 Maniacs, including "What's the Matter Here", "Hey Jack Kerouac", and "These Are Days".

== Early life ==
Buck was born August 1, 1958, in Chandlers Valley, Pennsylvania. He and his family moved to nearby Jamestown, New York during his high school years. He graduated from Cassadaga Valley High School in 1976 and received an associate's degree in anthropology from Jamestown Community College.

== Career ==
Buck decided to pursue a career as a professional guitarist after seeing The Jimi Hendrix Story. Buck, Dennis Drew, Steven Gustafson, John Lombardo, and Natalie Merchant formed 10,000 Maniacs in 1981; Buck was the band's lead guitarist.

The band's folk-rock music became popular with college students. Its 1987 album, In My Tribe, sold more than a million copies. In 1989, Blind Man's Zoo reached number 13 on the U.S. charts and was certified gold. Buck was the co-writer of some of the band's best-known songs, including "These Are Days", "Hey Jack Kerouac", and "What's the Matter Here?" He performed with the band at the Inaugural Ball in 1993. That same year, the band was profiled in Rolling Stone.

Buck was listed in Guitar Player magazine as one of the 100 greatest guitarists of all time.

== Personal life and death ==
Buck was married to Terri Newhouse from 1979 to 1981.

Buck dealt with issues related to his liver for several years. In November 2000, he contracted an illness which he believed was influenza, according to 10,000 Maniacs manager Blair Woods. His condition continued to worsen until he eventually collapsed, at which point he was taken to the hospital. On November 30, Buck was airlifted from WCA Hospital in Jamestown, New York to the UPMC Presbyterian hospital in Pittsburgh, Pennsylvania. He died of liver disease on December 19, 2000 at age 42.

== Discography ==
With 10,000 Maniacs

- Human Conflict Number Five (1982)
- Secrets of the I Ching (1983)
- The Wishing Chair (1985)
- In My Tribe (1987)
- Blind Man's Zoo (1989)
- Hope Chest: The Fredonia Recordings 1982–1983 (1990)
- Our Time in Eden (1992)
- MTV Unplugged (1993)
- Love Among the Ruins (1997)
- The Earth Pressed Flat (1999)
- Campfire Songs: The Popular, Obscure and Unknown Recordings (2004)

Other credits

- Victory Gardens (1991) with John & Mary – lead guitar, mandolin
- The Weedkiller's Daughter (1993) with John & Mary – lead guitar
- The Pinwheel Galaxy (2003) with John & Mary – backwards guitar
- Kerouac: Kicks Joy Darkness (2000)
