= The Great Blue Heron Music Festival =

Annual music festival in Sherman, New York, US

- Genre: Americana, old-time, bluegrass, Cajun, zydeco, reggae, funk, jam band
- Dates: Early July (Independence Day weekend)
- Locations: Heron Farm & Event Center, Sherman, New York
- Years active: 1992–present
- Founders: Julie Rockcastle, David Tidquist
- Website: greatblueheron.com

The Great Blue Heron Music Festival, commonly called Blue Heron or the Heron, is an annual music festival held over the Independence Day weekend in early July at the Heron Farm & Event Center in Sherman, Chautauqua County, New York, United States. Founded in 1992, the camping-based festival is held on a working farm and presents alineup of roots, folk, bluegrass, reggae, and jam music by regional and national artists across several stages, drawing several thousand attendees.

The festival grew out of the same Western New York and Finger Lakes roots-music scene as the Finger Lakes GrassRoots Festival of Music and Dance, and expanded from a single-day event into a multi-stage festival of more than 30 acts. The band Donna the Buffalo has performed every year and is regarded as the festival's de facto house band; other acts to have appeared include Rusted Root, The Avett Brothers, Lake Street Dive, 10,000 Maniacs, The Wailers, Sam Bush, and Jim Lauderdale.

== History ==
The first Great Blue Heron Music Festival was held on July 4, 1992, founded by Julie Rockcastle and David Tidquist on Rockcastle's family farm near Sherman. Tidquist, a regional promoter who had been involved with the GrassRoots festival circuit associated with Donna the Buffalo, wanted to start an outdoor festival in the area, while Rockcastle's family owned the land. Donna the Buffalo performed at the first festival and has appeared every year since; the Pittsburgh band Rusted Root marked the release of its debut album, Cruel Sun, at the inaugural event. Conceived to present "a diverse assortment of original music" by regional and national artists, the festival was initially planned as a single day but soon expanded to a three-day format.

Through the 2000s and 2010s the festival became an established regional event drawing several thousand people each Fourth of July weekend; a 2013 review counted more than 30 bands and an estimated 5,000 or more attendees. Its bills ranged from the festival's roots-music core to national touring acts: The Avett Brothers played in 2007, the 23rd festival in 2014 featured Donna the Buffalo and The Horse Flies, the 26th in 2017 paired Donna the Buffalo with Jim Lauderdale, and the 28th in 2019 was headlined by The Wailers, Donna the Buffalo, and the Jamestown-founded 10,000 Maniacs. The 2020 and 2021 festivals were cancelled because of the COVID-19 pandemic, and the event resumed in 2022.

The festival marked its 30th anniversary in 2023, with Donna the Buffalo headlining a bill of 33 acts that included Peter Rowan and Keller Williams. The 2024 edition was headlined by Sam Bush and added a larger stage in the woods. Co-founder David Tidquist died in November 2024; the 2025 festival was dedicated to him and its main stage was renamed "David's Stage," with a lineup that included Andy Frasco, Beats Antique, and Dustbowl Revival. The 2026 festival, the 33rd, was scheduled for July 2–5 and expanded to a four-day format led by Ripe, The Dip, Donna the Buffalo, and Moontricks.

== Format and venue ==
The festival takes place on the Rockcastle family's farm and campground outside Sherman, where the owners raise grass-fed cattle and organic shiitake mushrooms; the land has operated as a campground since the 1960s. The Erie Reader described the all-ages, camping-based event as "a festival for the generations". The festival is independently financed by the Rockcastles and does not carry corporate sponsorship.

Music is presented on several stages. For much of the festival's history these were a main stage, an all-night dance tent, and the wooded Tiger Maple Stage; a larger stage deep in the woods, later named the Dragon Stage, was added in 2024, and the main stage was renamed David's Stage in 2025 in honor of co-founder Tidquist. Alongside the music, the festival offers instrument and dance workshops, food and craft vendors, children's and teens' activities, and swimming at a lifeguarded pond.

== Music and performers ==
The festival's programming is rooted in Americana, old-time, and bluegrass, and extends across Cajun, zydeco, reggae, funk, soul, and jam band styles, with an emphasis on artists who perform original material. Well-known acts to have played the festival include The Avett Brothers, who appeared in 2007, as well as Lake Street Dive, Rusted Root, 10,000 Maniacs, The Wailers, Sam Bush, Keller Williams, Peter Rowan, Rubblebucket, Andy Frasco, and Beats Antique.

According to the festival's roster of past performers, artists who have appeared at the Great Blue Heron Music Festival include 10,000 Maniacs, Alison Pipitone, Armor & Sturtevant, Baby Gramps, Bombadil, Donna the Buffalo, Hypnotic Clambake, Jim Donovan, John & Mary, Kate Jacobs, Lightnin' Wells, Los Straitjackets, Peacefield, Rusted Root, Say Zuzu, Slobberbone, Slo-Mo, Southern Culture on the Skids, Steve Riley and the Mamou Playboys, The Avett Brothers, The Big Wu, The Burns Sisters, The Campbell Brothers, The Horse Flies, The Mighty Wallop!, The Mollys, The Red Stick Ramblers, The Tarbox Ramblers, Tim O'Brien, Tony Vacca, Zekuhl, and Zydeco Experiment. More recent performers have included Lake Street Dive, The Wailers, Sam Bush, Keller Williams, Peter Rowan, Rubblebucket, Andy Frasco & The U.N., Beats Antique, Ripe, and The Dip.
