= 2023–24 in downloadable songs for the Rock Band series =

- Songs released: 125
- Packs released: 2
- Albums released: 0

The Rock Band series of music video games supports downloadable songs for the Xbox One and PlayStation 4 versions through the consoles' respective online services. Users can download songs on a track-by-track basis, with many of the tracks also offered as part of a "song pack" or complete album at a discounted rate. All songs that are available to Rock Band 3 are playable in Rock Band Blitz.

Rock Band 4 was unveiled in March 2015, and released on October 6, 2015. On January 25, 2024, the last downloadable songs were released for Rock Band 4, as Harmonix will focus on development for Fortnite Festival.

== List of songs released in 2023 and 2024 ==
The following table lists the available songs for the Rock Band series released in 2023 and 2024. All songs available in packs are also available as individual song downloads on the same date unless otherwise noted. The dates listed are the initial release of songs on PlayStation Network and Xbox Live.

Starting from October 6, 2015, all music added to the downloadable content catalog is exclusive to Rock Band 4. In addition, due to changes in the charting format and gameplay of Rock Band 4, the released songs no longer support keyboard or Pro guitar and bass (future downloadable content will continue to support vocal harmonies and Pro drum charts), and most songs no longer display "family friendly" or "supervision recommended" ratings. Downloadable content from previous Rock Band titles (excepting The Beatles: Rock Band) is forward-compatible in Rock Band 4 within the same system family (Xbox 360 downloads are usable in the Xbox One version and PlayStation 3 downloads are usable in the PlayStation 4 version) at no additional cost.

On January 17, 2024, Harmonix announced that it would end the regular weekly release of new Rock Band 4 DLC after January 25, 2024, in order to focus on Fortnite Festival.

Song title	Artist	Year	Genre	Single / Pack name	Release date
"Thank You, Pain." (Note: Song was previously released as part of the Rock Band Network.)	The Agonist	2009	Metal	Riffing In The New Year 2023	Jan 5, 2023
"Second Sight Blackout"	Children of Nova	2009	Prog	Riffing In The New Year 2023	Jan 5, 2023
"The Fall of Aphonia"	Children of Nova	2009	Prog	Riffing In The New Year 2023	Jan 5, 2023
"We Collide"	Children of Nova	2009	Prog	Riffing In The New Year 2023	Jan 5, 2023
"Day of Mourning"	Despised Icon	2009	Metal	Riffing In The New Year 2023	Jan 5, 2023
"Shizuku"	Esprit D'Air	2012	J-Rock	Riffing In The New Year 2023	Jan 5, 2023
"You Ain't No Family"	iwrestledabearonce	2009	Metal	Riffing In The New Year 2023	Jan 5, 2023
"Still Alive"	Jonathan Coulton ft. Sara Quin	2011	Rock	Riffing In The New Year 2023	Jan 5, 2023
"Half Crazy"	Jukebox the Ghost	2010	Pop-Rock	Riffing In The New Year 2023	Jan 5, 2023
"Crazy"	Nonpoint	2010	Rock	Riffing In The New Year 2023	Jan 5, 2023
"Loved You a Little"	The Maine, Taking Back Sunday, and Charlotte Sands	2022	Pop-Rock	Single	Jan 12, 2023
"No Apologies"	Papa Roach	2022	Nu-Metal	Single	Jan 12, 2023
"Going Home to a Party"	JW Francis	2023	Indie Rock	Single	Jan 19, 2023
"Reelin' In the Years"	Steely Dan	1972	Classic Rock	Single	Jan 19, 2023
"Given Up"	Linkin Park	2007	Nu-Metal	Single	Jan 26, 2023
"Circles"	Varials	2022	Metal	Single	Jan 26, 2023
"Dangerous"	Set It Off	2022	Pop-Rock	Single	Feb 2, 2023
"Smile"	Wolf Alice	2021	Indie Rock	Single	Feb 2, 2023
"Sacrifice"	The Devil Wears Prada	2022	Metal	Single	Feb 9, 2023
"Crosses"	Sleeping With Sirens ft. Spencer Chamberlain of Underoath	2022	Emo	Single	Feb 9, 2023
"Better Together"	Jack Johnson	2005	Rock	Single	Feb 16, 2023
"Super Freaky Girl"	Nicki Minaj	2022	Pop/Dance/Electronic	Single	Feb 16, 2023
"Goodbye, Good Luck"	BEGINNERS	2022	Indie Rock	Single	Feb 23, 2023
"Worst Day"	ILLENIUM & Max	2022	Pop/Dance/Electronic	Single	Feb 23, 2023
"Bad Idea"	GUNNAR	2023	Rock	Single	Mar 2, 2023
"A Little Bit Better"	Ni/Co	2023	Pop-Rock	Single	Mar 2, 2023
"Here & Now"	Letters to Cleo	1993	Alternative	Single	Mar 9, 2023
"I'll Be There for You (Theme from "Friends")"	The Rembrandts	1995	Pop-Rock	Single	Mar 9, 2023
"High Society"	My Kid Brother	2022	Alternative	Single	Mar 16, 2023
"Take on Me"	Reel Big Fish	1998	Reggae/Ska	Single	Mar 16, 2023
"Let Me Out"	The Blue Stones	2022	Rock	Single	Mar 23, 2023
"Love From the Other Side"	Fall Out Boy	2023	Pop-Rock	Single	Mar 23, 2023
"Misery Business" (Note: Song was previously included in Rock Band 3.)	Paramore	2007	Pop-Rock	Single	Mar 30, 2023
"This Is Why"	Paramore	2023	Pop-Rock	Single	Mar 30, 2023
"L.E.S."	The Revel	2023	Indie Rock	Single	Apr 6, 2023
"The Gang's All Here"	Skid Row	2022	Glam	Single	Apr 6, 2023
"More the Victim"	Linkin Park	2023	Nu-Metal	Single	Apr 13, 2023
"Down to the Devil"	Naked Gypsy Queens	2022	Southern Rock	Single	Apr 13, 2023
"Space Oddity"	David Bowie	1969	Glam	Single	Apr 20, 2023
"Until I Found You"	Stephen Sanchez	2021	Pop-Rock	Single	Apr 20, 2023
"Mountain Sound"	Of Monsters and Men	2011	Indie Rock	Single	Apr 27, 2023
"PANIC"	YONAKA	2023	Alternative	Single	Apr 27, 2023
"Dial Tone"	Catch Your Breath	2022	Metal	Single	May 4, 2023
"Peace That Starts the War"	Wolves At The Gate	2022	Metal	Single	May 4, 2023
"Mary on a Cross"	Ghost	2019	Metal	Single	May 11, 2023
"Ultraviolet"	Spell	2022	Metal	Single	May 11, 2023
"Song 2" (Note: Song was previously included in Lego Rock Band.)	Blur	1997	Alternative	Single	May 18, 2023
"Back to Better"	The Bouncing Souls	2023	Punk	Single	May 18, 2023
"lovespell"	covet	2023	Prog	Single	May 25, 2023
"Oh!"	The Linda Lindas	2022	Punk	Single	May 25, 2023
"Nobody"	Avenged Sevenfold	2023	Metal	Single	Jun 1, 2023
"Voices In My Head"	Falling In Reverse	2022	Rock	Single	Jun 1, 2023
"Goo Goo Muck"	The Cramps	1981	Rock	Single	Jun 8, 2023
"Rescued"	Foo Fighters	2023	Alternative	Single	Jun 8, 2023
"You Oughta Know" (Note: Song was previously included in Rock Band 2.)	Alanis Morissette	1995	Alternative	Single	Jun 15, 2023
"Cannonball"	AWOLNATION	2018	Alternative	Single	Jun 15, 2023
"Girls Make Me Wanna Die"	The Aces	2023	Pop-Rock	Single	Jun 22, 2023
"Settling"	Ripe	2023	Pop-Rock	Single	Jun 22, 2023
"Crossfire"	Stevie Ray Vaughan and Double Trouble	1989	Blues	Single	Jun 29, 2023
"I Can See for Miles"	The Who	1967	Classic Rock	Single	Jun 29, 2023
"All That She Wants"	Ace of Base	1993	Pop/Dance/Electronic	Single	Jul 6, 2023
"White Trash Millionaire"	Mom Jeans.	2022	Emo	Single	Jul 6, 2023
"Born in the Heat"	CIVIC	2023	Punk	Single	Jul 13, 2023
"Let Me Be Normal"	Militarie Gun	2022	Punk	Single	Jul 13, 2023
"Mind Rider"	Hail the Sun	2023	Prog	Single	Jul 20, 2023
"Through the Noise"	Nita Strauss ft. Lzzy Hale	2023	Metal	Single	Jul 20, 2023
"Aliens Exist"	Blink-182	1999	Punk	Single	Jul 27, 2023
"Big Rig"	Pigs Pigs Pigs Pigs Pigs Pigs Pigs	2023	Metal	Single	Jul 27, 2023
"Heartbreaker 2.0"	Dirty Honey	2023	Rock	Single	Aug 3, 2023
"Bad Things"	I Prevail	2022	Metal	Single	Aug 3, 2023
"Locked & Loaded"	The Brevet	2018	Rock	Single	Aug 10, 2023
"Homesick"	HUNNY	2022	Indie Rock	Single	Aug 10, 2023
"Believe"	The Bravery	2007	Alternative	Single	Aug 17, 2023
"Delete Myself"	Fake Names	2023	Punk	Single	Aug 17, 2023
"Makeshift Vehicles"	Body Thief	2022	Indie Rock	Single	Aug 24, 2023
"Medicine"	Tiny Moving Parts	2019	Emo	Single	Aug 24, 2023
"Burn"	Alexis Munroe	2023	Rock	Single	Aug 31, 2023
"Rain Down"	Solence	2023	Metal	Single	Aug 31, 2023
"The Fall"	flipturn	2022	Indie Rock	Single	Sep 7, 2023
"Heartbreak of the Century"	Neck Deep	2023	Punk	Single	Sep 7, 2023
"White Wedding (Part 1)"	Billy Idol	1982	Rock	Single	Sep 14, 2023
"Master Exploder"	Tenacious D	2006	Rock	Single	Sep 14, 2023
"IDWBS"	Friday Pilots Club	2022	Rock	Single	Sep 21, 2023
"The Summoning"	Sleep Token	2023	Prog	Single	Sep 21, 2023
"Masters of Morbidity"	200 Stab Wounds	2022	Metal	Single	Sep 28, 2023
"Roundabout"	Yes	1971	Prog	Single	Sep 28, 2023
"You're the Best"	Joe "Bean" Esposito	1984	Pop-Rock	Single	Oct 5, 2023
"Love U Madly"	Violet Saturn	2023	Pop-Rock	Single	Oct 5, 2023
"Pack of Smokes" (Note: Song is available at no cost.)	Blame It On Whitman	2023	Punk	8th Anniversary Free DLC Pack	Oct 6, 2023
"She's Got Sorcery"	I Fight Dragons	2021	Rock	8th Anniversary Free DLC Pack	Oct 6, 2023
"Black Earth, WI"	Ratboys	2023	Indie Rock	8th Anniversary Free DLC Pack	Oct 6, 2023
"Call Me Crazy"	ARXX ft. Pillow Queens	2023	Indie Rock	Single	Oct 12, 2023
"Season 5 (Break My Fall)"	TOWNS	2022	Pop-Rock	Single	Oct 12, 2023
"A Little Wild"	Anna Graceman & Ryan Corn	2023	Indie Rock	Single	Oct 19, 2023
"Love Is Not a Weapon"	Welshly Arms	2023	Indie Rock	Single	Oct 19, 2023
"All I Really Wanna Do"	Devon Gilfillian	2023	R&B/Soul/Funk	Single	Oct 26, 2023
"Miles and Miles"	The Heavy Heavy	2020	Indie Rock	Single	Oct 26, 2023
"Sickness"	Grey Daze	2020	Rock	Single	Nov 2, 2023
"Welcome Home"	Heaven's Basement	2013	Rock	Single	Nov 2, 2023
"Addison Rae"	Magnolia Park	2022	Punk	Single	Nov 9, 2023
"Check Yes Juliet"	We the Kings	2007	Emo	Single	Nov 9, 2023
"Riptide"	Beartooth	2022	Punk	Single	Nov 16, 2023
"Six Feet Under"	Charlotte Sands	2023	Pop-Rock	Single	Nov 16, 2023
"Rehab"	Amy Winehouse	2006	R&B/Soul/Funk	Single	Nov 23, 2023
"Brassic"	Grade 2	2023	Punk	Single	Nov 23, 2023
"It's Alright"	Cecilia Castleman	2022	Pop-Rock	Single	Nov 30, 2023
"Bath County"	Wednesday	2023	Indie Rock	Single	Nov 30, 2023
"Sometimes"	Dreamgirl	2021	Pop-Rock	Single	Dec 7, 2023
"Future Blind"	The Lighthouse and the Whaler	2018	Indie Rock	Single	Dec 7, 2023
"Poison Pill"	Silverstein	2022	Emo	Single	Dec 14, 2023
"Vasoline" (Note: Song was previously included in Rock Band.)	Stone Temple Pilots	1994	Alternative	Single	Dec 14, 2023
"Shapeshifter"	The Brevet	2020	Rock	Single	Dec 21, 2023
"Baker Street"	Gerry Rafferty	1978	Classic Rock	Single	Dec 21, 2023
"In a Big Country"	Big Country	1983	New Wave	Single	Dec 28, 2023
"Saturday Night's Alright for Fighting"	Elton John	1973	Classic Rock	Single	Dec 28, 2023
"Centerfold"	The J. Geils Band	1981	Rock	Single	Jan 4, 2024
"Low Rider"	WAR	1975	R&B/Soul/Funk	Single	Jan 4, 2024
"So What'cha Want"	Beastie Boys	1992	Hip-Hop/Rap	Single	Jan 11, 2024
"Breakout"	Foo Fighters	1999	Alternative	Single	Jan 11, 2024
"No One Knows"	Queens of the Stone Age	2002	Alternative	Single	Jan 11, 2024
"Goodbye Yellow Brick Road"	Elton John	1973	Classic Rock	Single	Jan 18, 2024
"Our Love Will Still Be There"	The Troggs	1966	Classic Rock	Single	Jan 18, 2024
"Wherever You Will Go"	The Calling	2001	Alternative	Single	Jan 25, 2024
"Thank You"	Dido	1999	Alternative	Single	Jan 25, 2024
"Send Me on My Way"	Rusted Root	1994	Rock	Single	Jan 25, 2024
