= Louis XIV (disambiguation) =

Louis XIV (1638–1715; r. 1643–1715) was King of France.

Louis XIV or Louis Quatorze may also refer to:

== Arts and entertainment ==
- "Louis Quatorze", a song by Bow Wow Wow from the EP The Last of the Mohicans
- Louis XIV (band), rock band from San Diego, California
  - Louis XIV (album), their debut studio album
- Louis XIV (board game)
- Louis XIV furniture, style of furniture
- Louis XIV style, architectural style

== Other uses ==
- French ship Louis-XIV (1854), a warship
- Louis Quatorze (horse)

== See also ==
- King Louis (disambiguation)
- Sun King (disambiguation)
