= Welcome to My Party =

Welcome to My Party may refer to:

- Welcome to My Party (album), a 2002 album by Rusted Root, or the title song
- Welcome to My Party (song), a 1989 song by Luv'
