= Rusted Root (album) =

Studio album by Rusted Root
- Released: November 10, 1998
- Genre: Rock
- Length: 51:46
- Label: Mercury/PolyGram
- Producer: Pat Moran; Susan Rogers

Rusted Root chronology
Remember (1996)	Rusted Root (1998)	Welcome to My Party (2002)

Professional ratings
Review scores
Source	Rating
Allmusic	link

Rusted Root is the fourth studio album by Rusted Root, released in 1998.

== Track listing ==
All songs written by Michael Glabicki except where noted.

1. "She Roll Me Up" – 4:26
2. "Rising Sun" – 2:57
3. "Magenta Radio" – 4:23
4. "My Love" (Jim DiSpirito, Glabicki) – 4:15
5. "Live a Long Time" – 3:39
6. "Kill You Dead" – 4:25
7. "Airplane" (Liz Berlin, Glabicki) – 3:16
8. "Agbadza" (DiSpirito, Glabicki) – 4:30
9. "Moon" (Berlin, Glabicki) – 4:19
10. "Away From" – 4:07
11. "Flower" – 4:48
12. "You Can't Always Get What You Want" (Mick Jagger, Keith Richards) – 6:41

== Personnel ==
- Liz Berlin – Vocals (background), Guitar (12 String), Vocal Arrangement, Organ Arrangement
- John Buynak – Guitar (Electric)
- Jack Casady – Bass
- David Coleman – Cello, Harmonium, String Arrangements
- Jim DiSpirito – Talking Drum
- Jim Donovan – Drums, Gong, Tom-Tom, Vocals (background), Trash Cans, Kashmiri Bell
- Michael Falzarano – Mandolin
- Michael Glabicki – Guitar (Acoustic), Guitar (Electric), Vocals, Vocals (background), Hi String Guitar (Acoustic)
- Jorma Kaukonen – Guitar
- Jeff Lawrence – Guitar
- Patrick Norman – Bass, Guitar (Electric), Marimba, Vocals (background), Cabasa
- Susan Rogers – Vocals (background), Producer
- Pete Sears – Organ, Piano, Accordion, Wurlitzer
- Andrew Sharp – Vocals (background), Production Coordination
- Harvey Sorgen – Washboard
- John "Flappy" Stovicek – Guitar

=== Production ===
- Peter Beckerman – Engineer
- Jack Hersca – Assistant Engineer
- George Marino – Mastering
- Pat Moran – Producer, Engineer
- Susan Rogers – Producer
- Mike Speranzo – Engineer
