= Stereo Rodeo =

Studio album by Rusted Root
- Released: 2009
- Genre: Rock
- Label: Touchy Pegg/Adrenaline/DKE
- Producer: Michael Glabicki

Rusted Root chronology
Greatest Hits (2005)	Stereo Rodeo (2009)	The Movement (2012)

Stereo Rodeo is a studio album by the American band Rusted Root, released 2009. The first single was "Bad Son", which criticizes George W. Bush. The band supported the album with a North American tour.

Some of the album's tracks originated as Michael Glabicki solo songs; Glabicki produced the album. The cover of "Suspicious Minds" incorporated Latin percussion to help reproduce the original's guitar licks.

== Critical reception ==
The Pittsburgh Tribune-Review deemed Stereo Rodeo "arguably the most diverse album in Rusted Root's 20-year career." Paraphrasing Hunter S. Thompson, The Charleston Gazette called the album "a record made by people who can't write or sing for people who don't know the difference." The Washington Post noted "the polyrhythmic joys of a band that celebrates the creative diversity of its members and the global vibes around them."

The editorial staff of AllMusic Guide gave the album 3.5 out of five stars, with reviewer Stephen Thomas Erlewine, noting that this release combines the pop music elements of Welcome to My Party with the band's more traditional worldbeat influences, characterizing this album as "a way to get the band back to their roots without drawing attention to any machinations that get them there."

== Track listing ==
All songs written by Michael Glabicki except where noted.

1. "Dance in the Middle" – 4:51
2. "Suspicious Minds" (Mark James) – 5:06
3. "Weary Bones" – 3:37
4. "Bad Son" – 3:19
5. "Give You the Grace" – 5:50
6. "Driving One" (Rusted Root) – 2:27
7. "Stereo Rodeo" – 3:57
8. "Driving Two" (Rusted Root) – 1:53
9. "Animals Love Touch" – 3:15
10. "Garbage Man" – 4:23
11. "Crucible Glow" – 4:04

== Personnel ==
- Michael Glabicki – lead vocals, guitar, percussion, drums (Bad Son)
- Liz Berlin – vocals, percussion
- Patrick Norman – vocals, bass, percussion, guitar (Dance in the Middle), horn arrangements (Crucible Glow)
- Jason Miller – drums, percussion, timpani
- Preach Freedom – percussion, vocals
- Colter Harper – electric guitar, percussion
- Dirk Miller – electric guitar, banjo, mandolin
