= Sun King (disambiguation) =

Sun King is a sobriquet of Louis XIV of France.

Sun King may also refer to:

- "Sun King" (song), by the Beatles
- Sun King (character), a fictional character in the Marvel Comics
- The Sun King (film), a 2005 Danish comedy

== See also ==
- Sun King Brewing, a brewery in Indianapolis, Indiana
- Sun King Warriors, a band from Pittsburgh, Pennsylvania
- King of the Sun (album), a 2012 album by The Saints
- Le Roi Soleil (musical) (English: The Sun King), 2005 French musical about Louis XIV
