= Airplane (EP) =

EP by Rusted Root
- Released: 1998
- Length: 30:20

Professional ratings
Review scores
Source	Rating
Allmusic	3/5 stars

Airplane is an EP released in 1998 by Rusted Root.

== Track listing ==
1. "Airplane"
2. "Agbadza"
3. "Martyr (Live)"
4. "Laugh As The Sun (Live)"
5. "Away From"
6. "Indigo: Music For Exploration And Evolution"
