= Remember (Rusted Root album) =

Studio album by Rusted Root
- Released: October 22, 1996
- Genre: Rock
- Length: 65:24
- Label: Mercury/PolyGram
- Producer: Jerry Harrison, Rusted Root

Rusted Root chronology
When I Woke (1994)	Remember (1996)	Rusted Root (1998)

Professional ratings
Review scores
Source	Rating
Allmusic	4.5/5 stars

Remember is the third studio album by Rusted Root, released in 1996. It has since been certified Gold in the United States. The song "Virtual Reality" was used in the 1996 film Twister.

== Track listing ==
All songs written by Michael Glabicki except where noted.

1. "Faith I Do Believe" – 4:31
2. "Heaven" – 4:00
3. "Sister Contine" – 5:13
4. "Virtual Reality" – 3:21
5. "Infinite Space" – 4:12
6. "Voodoo" – 6:12
7. "Dangle" (Liz Berlin, Glabicki) – 4:19
8. "Silver-N-Gold" (Berlin, Glabicki) – 4:26
9. "Baby Will Roam" – 4:24
10. "Bullets in the Fire" – 5:05
11. "Who Do You Tell It To" – 4:12
12. "River in a Cage" – 4:43
13. "Scattered" – 4:29
14. "Circle of Remembrance" – 6:17

== Personnel ==
- Liz Berlin – Guitar, Arranger, Tambourine, Vocals, Penny Whistle, Djembe, Sleigh Bells
- John Buynak – Flute, Mandolin, Guitar (Electric), Photography
- Daniel Chase – Stick
- Jim DiSpirito – Dumbek, Cymbals, Sax (Soprano), Stick, Tabla, Tambourine, Timbales, Bells, Shaker, Dhol, Riqq, Taos Drum, Log Drums
- Jim Donovan – Dumbek, Drums, Stick, Vocals, Agogo Bell, Granite Block, Tibetan Finger Cymbals
- Michael Glabicki – Guitar (Acoustic), Mandolin, Guitar (Electric), Vocals, Vocals (background), Guitar (12 String), Slide Guitar, Guitar (Classical)
- Jerry Harrison – Piano, Producer, Djembe
- Patrick Norman – Bass, Piano, Guitar (Electric), Vocals, Organ Arrangement
- Michael Railton – Organ, Organ Arrangement
- Mike Speranzo – Guitar, Arranger

=== Production ===
- Tim Bomba – Producer, Engineer
- Chris Collins – Assistant Engineer
- Karl Derfler – Engineer, Mixing
- Greg Forsberg – Assistant Engineer
- David Gleeson – Assistant Engineer
- Mauricio Iragorri – Assistant Engineer
- Ted Jensen – Mastering
- Claudius Kumar – Assistant Engineer
- Bob Levy – Assistant Engineer
- Josh Kiser – Assistant Engineer
- Tom Lord-Alge – Remixing, Mixing
- Sandra Monteparo – Design
- Rick Patrick – Art Direction
- Rusted Root – Producer
- Dana Tynan – Photography
