= When I Woke =

Studio album by Rusted Root
- Released: August 23, 1994
- Genre: Rock
- Length: 58:45
- Label: Mercury/PolyGram
- Producer: Bill Bottrell

Rusted Root chronology
Cruel Sun (1992)	When I Woke (1994)	Remember (1996)

Singles from When I Woke
- 1. "Send Me on My Way" Released: 1995; 2. "Ecstasy" Released: 1995

Professional ratings
Review scores
Source	Rating
AllMusic	3/5 stars

When I Woke is the second album and major-label debut of the American rock band Rusted Root. It has been certified platinum in the United States.

== Track listing ==
All songs written by Rusted Root with lyrics by Michael Glabicki except where noted.

No.	Title	Writer(s)	Length
1.	"Drum Trip"		3:45
2.	"Ecstasy"		5:02
3.	"Send Me on My Way"		4:22
4.	"Cruel Sun"	Liz Berlin, Michael Glabicki	8:00
5.	"Cat Turned Blue"	Glabicki, Patrick Norman, Berlin, Jenn Wertz	3:43
6.	"Beautiful People"		4:10
7.	"Martyr"		4:26
8.	"Rain"		3:43
9.	"Food & Creative Love"		4:13
10.	"Lost in a Crowd"		4:01
11.	"Laugh as the Sun"		5:59
12.	"Infinite Tamboura"		1:53
13.	"Back to the Earth"	Wertz, John Buynak, Glabicki	5:27

== Personnel ==
=== Rusted Root ===
- Mike Glabicki - lead vocal, acoustic guitar, electric guitar, 12-string guitar
- Liz Berlin - backing vocals, percussion, acoustic guitar
- Jim Donovan - drum set, percussion, backing vocals
- Patrick Norman - bass, electric guitar, backing vocals, percussion
- John Buynak - acoustic guitar, electric guitar, flute, penny whistle, harmonicas, banjo, marimba, backing vocals, percussion
- Jenn Wertz - backing vocals, percussion
- Daniel James "Jim" DiSpirito - congas, djembe, talking drum, myriad hand percussion

== Charts ==
=== Weekly charts ===
Chart (1994–95)	Peak position
US Billboard 200	51
US Heatseekers Albums (Billboard)	1

=== Year-end charts ===
Chart (1995)	Position
US Billboard 200	177
