= Sun King Warriors =

American band

Sun King Warriors is a band from Pittsburgh, Pennsylvania. It was formed in 2013 by drummer Jim Donovan, formerly of Rusted Root, who is the band's singer-songwriter-lead guitarist. Other musicians in the band include Joe Marini (drums), Kevin McDonald (guitar), Kent Tonkin (bass), Dan Murphy (guitar/harmonica/mandolin), and Bryan Fazio (percussion). Donovan's teenaged children Tupelo, Ella, and Oliver have provided backup on the band's recordings.

The band's music has been described as a mix of Americana, groove rock, and "two tons of drums". Its debut album was the independently-produced Sun King Warriors, released in early 2016 to good reviews.

The second album 'We See Through It' was released in April 2018 and gained radio play with 'You Are My Everything' 'You in My Arms' and 'We See Through It.'

Their third album 'Like a Light' was released in October of 2024. Music critic, Scott Mervis of the Pittsburgh Post-Gazette called it "one of the best classic-rock albums of the year." It features The Record Company cover, 'Off the Ground.

Sun King Warriors performs at music venues and festivals in Pennsylvania, Maryland, Ohio, New York, and West Virginia.
