= Armor & Sturtevant =

Armor and Sturtevant were an American husband and wife musical and recording artist duo that existed from 1991 to 2005. They lived and were based in Erie, Pennsylvania.

== Musical genre and instrumentation ==
Armor & Sturtevant interpreted folk music from East Africa, Appalachia, and the British Isles, and wrote songs inspired and influenced by various folk traditions, classical music, bluegrass, rock and roll, and jazz. Their collaborative work utilized many instruments including:

Kelly Armor: voice, flute, bass flute, fife, pennywhistle, chivoti, piano, accordion, concertina, bodhrán and various East African hand percussion instruments such as the kalimba and the kayamba.

Dave Sturtevant: voice, acoustic guitar, electric guitar, resophonic guitar, banjo, mandolin, and fiddle.

== History ==
Armor & Sturtevant toured across the United States and appeared in other countries, performing and offering workshops at opera houses, schools, churches, and multicultural events and festivals. They worked in collaboration with a ballet company, a women's chorus, a flute choir, an African drum and dance ensemble, Appalachian cloggers, a chamber orchestra and a children's choir. They were listed on the Pennsylvania Performing Arts on Tour Roster (and received two grants from them), and the Pennsylvania Council on the Arts Roster for Arts in Education, and they have been favorably reviewed in The Plain Dealer, Erie Daily Times, Dirty Linen Magazine, the Rockville Gazette and the Washington Post.

== Biographies ==
Kelly Armor studied composition at Yale University with David Hicks and Martin Bresnick, and flute performance with Thomas Nyfenger. For 2 1/2 years she lived with native families in Kenya and Tanzania, became fluent in Swahili, and collected Pagan, Islamic, and Christian traditional songs, learning to play indigenous flutes and hand percussion instruments. She received a B.A. in Intercultural Studies and Ethnomusicology from the Friends World Program of Long Island University in 1988. She has given workshops and lectures on East African music and culture for the Library of Congress, the National Flute Association, and at Chautauqua Institution. In 1999, she was hired as an oral historian by the Erie Maritime Museum where she collected stories about Erie's lakefront history. She currently serves as the Director of Education and Folk Art at the Erie Art Museum, where she has taught classes as part of the Earth Force Call to Action youth workshop program and has participated in more than 30 long-term residencies with pre-school, elementary, middle school, and adult students. She is active in the Unitarian Universalist Church, and has taught and performed there along with Tanzanian musician Fadhil Nkurlu, and appeared on their radio show Studio One with Karen Impola. Other collaborations with Nkurlu include classes at the University of Northern Iowa and Chautaugua Institute in New York State. She also has played with the Great American Gypsies.

Dave Sturtevant learned singing and fiddle from his father (born in the Appalachian foothills of north central Pennsylvania), performing traditional ballads, camp songs, and Lutheran hymns. He studied voice and trumpet in high school and college, and is self-taught on guitar. In 1986 he received a B.S. in Sound Recording Technology from the State University of New York at Fredonia. In 1993 he was a finalist in the Kerrville New Folk Songwriting Contest. His songs have been recorded and performed by other nationally touring folk musicians such as Joe Stead, Dan Duggan, John Kirk, Neal and Leandra, and Sue Trainor..

== Recording and broadcast ==
Armor and Sturtevant have produced recordings of their own music and performances of musicological interest from other parts of the world. Both of their CDs on the Tatema Music label have garnered air play on folk radio programs nationwide, including National Public Radio's Car Talk, WVBR's Bound for Glory series and internationally on the United States Information Agency's Voice of America. They have also appeared on the albums of Dan Berggren and the Great American Gypsies.

== Past performances ==
- Blissfest, Cross Village, Michigan
- Baltimore Folk Music Society, Maryland
- Caffè Lena, Saratoga, New York
- Grand River Folk Art Society, Grand Rapids, Michigan
- Central Pennsylvania Festival of the Arts
- Fredonia Opera House, Fredonia, New York
- Whitaker Center, Harrisburg, Pennsylvania
- Bickford Theater, Morris Museum, Morristown, New Jersey
- Two Harbors Folk Festival, Minnesota
- Common Ground, Westminster, Maryland
- Shenandoah Music Festival, Orkney Springs, Virginia
- Frostburg State University, Frostburg, Maryland
- Reading Musical Foundation, Reading, Pennsylvania
- Kent State University Folk Festival, Kent, Ohio
- Starwood Festival, Sherman, New York
- The Great Blue Heron Music Festival, Sherman, New York
- Down East Folklore Society, Beaufort, North Carolina
- Tidewater Friends of Folk Music, Norfolk, Virginia
- Morgan County Arts Council, Berkeley Springs, West Virginia
- Erie Summer Festival of the Arts, Pennsylvania
- Calliope Folk Music Society, Pittsburgh, Pennsylvania
- Fredericksburg Songwriters' Showcase 1998, Fredericksburg, VA
- GottaGetGon Folk Festival, Saratoga County, New York
- Westminster College, New Wilmington, Pennsylvania
- First Congregational Church, River Edge, New Jersey
- Bound for Glory on WVBR-FM, Ithaca NY

== Discography ==
- 1993 - Spring Day (Tatema Music) - CD and cassette
- 1996 - You Dance Like You Drive (Tatema Music) - CD and cassette
- 2003 - Crayola Doesn't Make a Color for Your Eyes - Erie Pennsylvania School District: Limited Edition Recording of the District Choir's Annual Concert (125 kids singing a Kristin Andreasson song and doing body percussion under Armor & Sturtevant's direction.)
- 2008 - next one by - Davy Sturtevant & Brenda Jean (Butch Bunny Records)

=== Performed as guest artists ===
- 1985 - Adirondack Green - Dan Berggren (remastered for CD in 2001) Sleeping Giant Records
- 1997 - Cloudsplitter - Dan Berggren (Sleeping Giant Records) Folk and Acoustic Music Exchange: review by Kerry Dexter of Peterborough Folk Music Society
- 2001 - Rooted in the Mountains - Dan Berggren, Dan Duggan and friends (Dave Sturtevant only) (Sleeping Giant Records) Daily Vault review by Duke Egbert
- 2004 - Before I Had A Red Tomato - Great American Gypsies (Caravan Recordings) Review by John R. Lindermuth in Rambles Magazine
- 2005 - Minerva - Dan Berggren (Sleeping Giant Records)

=== Musicological recordings ===
- 2001 - Vavaka: Contemporary Christian Composers of Madagascar (Erie Art Museum)
- 2004 - Roho: Songs of the Spirit from East Africa (Erie Art Museum)

== Film ==
- 2002 - Safe Harbor: A Story of the Underground Railroad - A Main Street Media Inc. Production in association with the Harry Burleigh Society, the Northwest Pennsylvania Freedom Institute and WQLN Public Broadcasting of Northwestern Pennsylvania
