= Cruel Sun =

Studio album by Rusted Root
- Released: 1992
- Studios: Audiomation, Pittsburgh
- Genres: Rock, bluegrass
- Length: 57:42
- Labels: Blue Duck; Ignition
- Producers: Rusted Root; Dave Brown

Rusted Root chronology
Cruel Sun (1992)	When I Woke (1994)

Professional ratings
Review scores
Source	Rating
AllMusic	3/5 stars
The Encyclopedia of Popular Music	3/5 stars
MusicHound Rock: The Essential Album Guide	4/5 stars

Cruel Sun is the debut album by the band Rusted Root, released in 1992.

The album sold over 100,000 copies, which led to the band's major label recording contract.

== Album cover ==
The album cover depicts a stylized image of the disc of Mictlantecuhtli, a Teotihuacan monolith, currently housed at the National Museum of Anthropology in Mexico City.

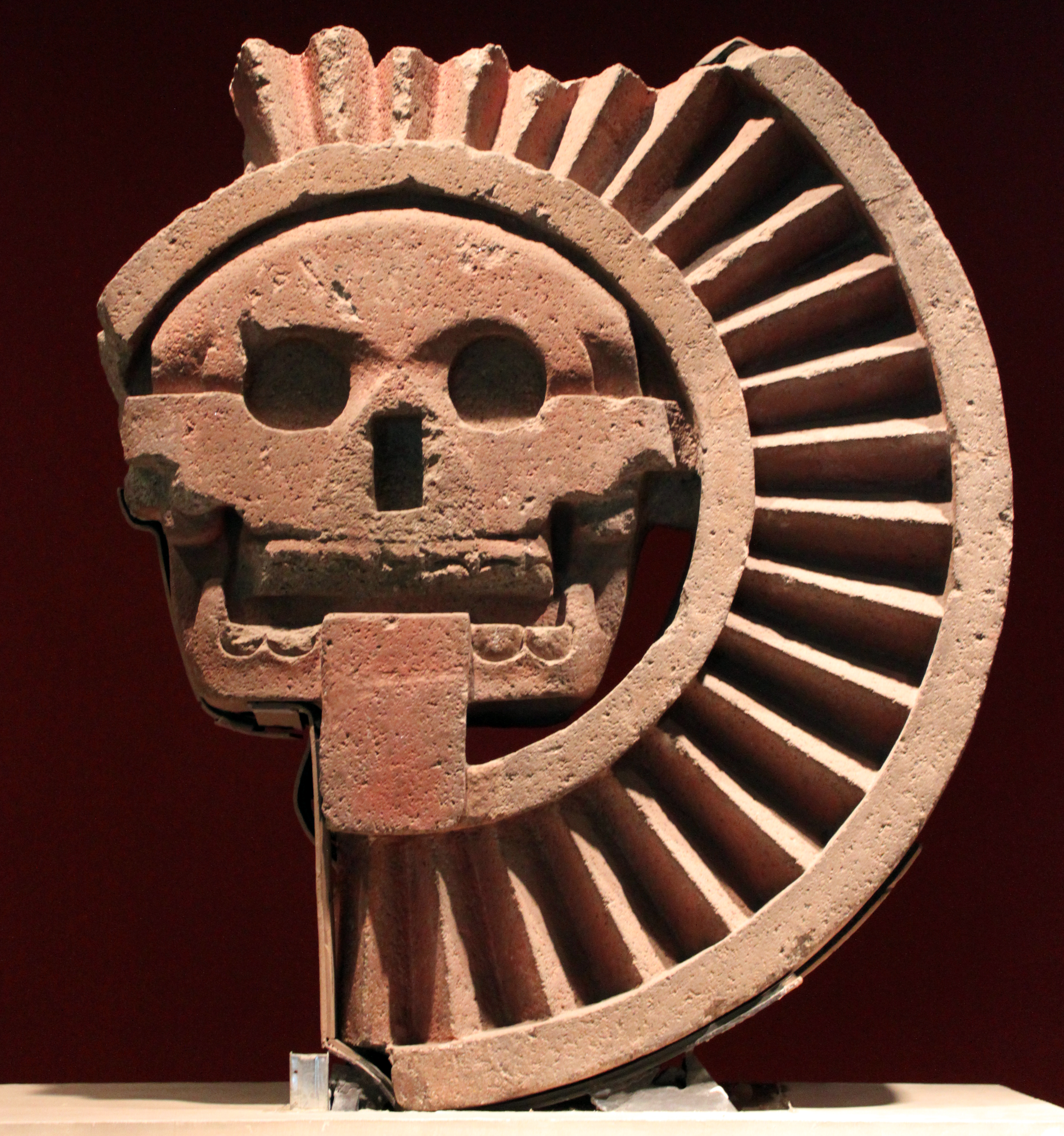
Disc of Mictlantecuhtli

== Critical reception ==
Trouser Press wrote that "despite the assistance of assorted sprites and faeries, Rusted Root’s rhythmic world music-influenced drivel is better suited for a Pringles commercial than a tribal gathering." MusicHound Rock: The Essential Album Guide called the album "an incredibly well-realized indie debut."

== Track listing ==
All songs written by Michael Glabicki except where noted.

1. "Primal Scream" (Bendin, Berlin, Glabicki) - 5:10
2. "Send Me on My Way" - 4:57
3. "Tree" (Berlin, Gablicki, Wertz) - 8:00
4. "Won't Be Long" - 3:13
5. "!@#*" - 0:40
6. "Cat Turned Blue" - 4:03
7. "Artificial Winter" - 3:37
8. "Where She Runs" - 9:21
9. "Martyr" - 5:19
10. "Back to the Earth" (Buynak, Wertz, Glabicki) - 5:48
11. "Scattered" - 4:34

== Personnel ==
- Liz Berlin – Percussion, Drums, Vocals, Hand Drums
- John Buynak – Percussion, Drums, Vocals, Wind Instruments, Hand Drums
- Jim Donovan – Percussion, Drums, Hand Drums
- Michael Glabicki – Guitar, Vocals, Mixing
- Patrick Norman – Percussion, Bass Guitar, Sitar, Vocals
- Jenn Wertz – Percussion, Vocals

=== Production ===
- Dave Brown – Producer, Mixing
- Lara Lampenfield – Photography, Sleeve Photo
- Mike Michalski – Producer
- Randy Rhodes – Engineer
- Mark McNeely – Assistant Engineer
- Rusted Root – Writer, Producer

Recorded at Audiomation Studios in Pittsburgh, PA
