= Donna the Buffalo =

American rock band

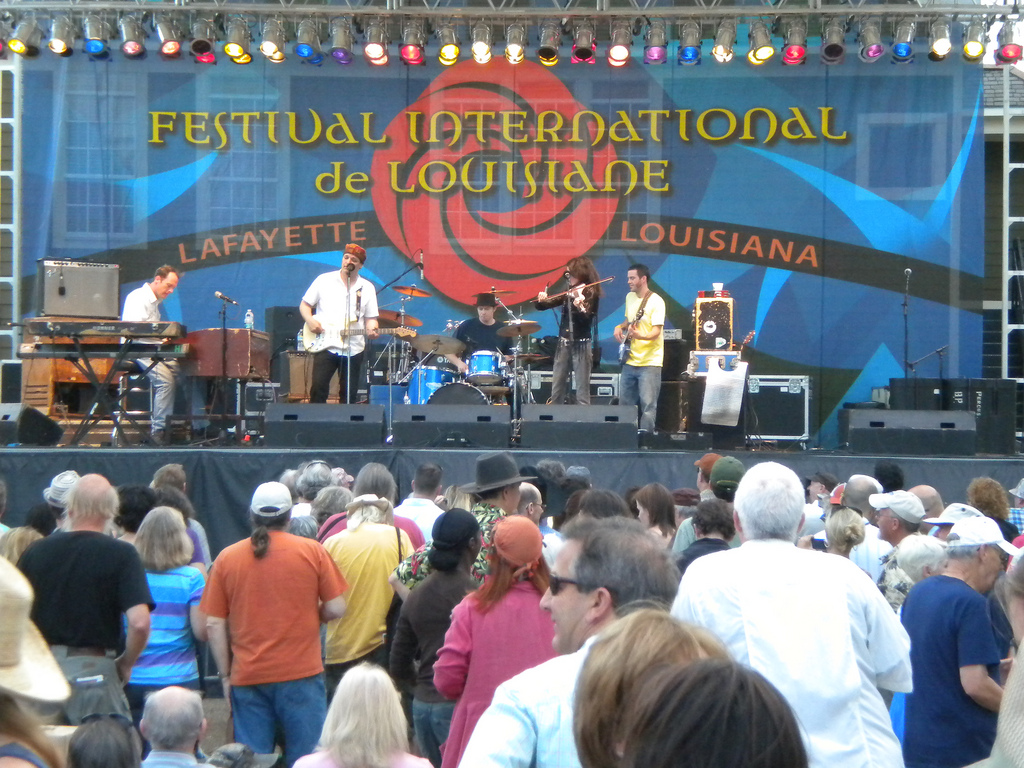
- At the Festival International 2010 in Lafayette, Louisiana

Background information
- Also known as: Dawn of the Buffalo
- Origin: New York, USA
- Genres: Zydeco; folk rock; country rock; reggae; roots music
- Years active: 1989–present
- Members: Tara Nevins; Jeb Puryear; Chris English; David McCracken; Ted Pecchio
- Past members: Joe Thrift; Richie Stearns; Jennie Stearns; Kathy Ziegler; Tom Gilbert; Shane Lamphier; Jimmy Triplett; Jim Miller; Jordon Puryear; Jed Greenberg; Bill Reynolds; Jay Sanders; Vic Stafford
- Website: donnatheBuffalo.com

Donna the Buffalo is a band from Trumansburg, New York. It plays both original songs and cover versions.

A musician friend suggested "Dawn of the Buffalo" as a name for the band, which was misheard as "Donna the Buffalo" and, over thirty years later, the band is still called "Donna the Buffalo". The followers of the group are called The Herd, a self-organized "tribe" of people who found each other at the group's live events.

Donna the Buffalo is one of the founding and host bands of the annual Finger Lakes GrassRoots Festival of Music and Dance, and of the Shakori Hills Grassroots Festival; and is among the headliners at The Great Blue Heron Music Festival in Sherman, New York. The band was featured in On The Bus, a documentary co-directed by Dave Sale.

The band has performed and recorded with a variety of musicians, including such prominent folk/roots performers as Jim Lauderdale, the father and son zydeco musicians Preston and Keith Frank, Bela Fleck of Bela Fleck and the Flecktones, the Malian musician Mamadou Diabate, Claire Lynch, David Hidalgo of Los Lobos, The Duhks and Amy Helm. In 2009, Tara Nevins toured with the former Grateful Dead drummer Bill Kreutzmann and his band, BK3.

== Members ==
- Tara Nevins - vocals, fiddle, acoustic guitar, accordion, washboard ("frottoir" in Louisiana French ), tambourine
- Jeb Puryear - vocals, electric guitar, occasional pedal steel
- Chris English - drums
- David McCracken - Hammond organ, Hohner Clavinet, piano
- Ted Pecchio - electric bass guitar

Tara Nevins

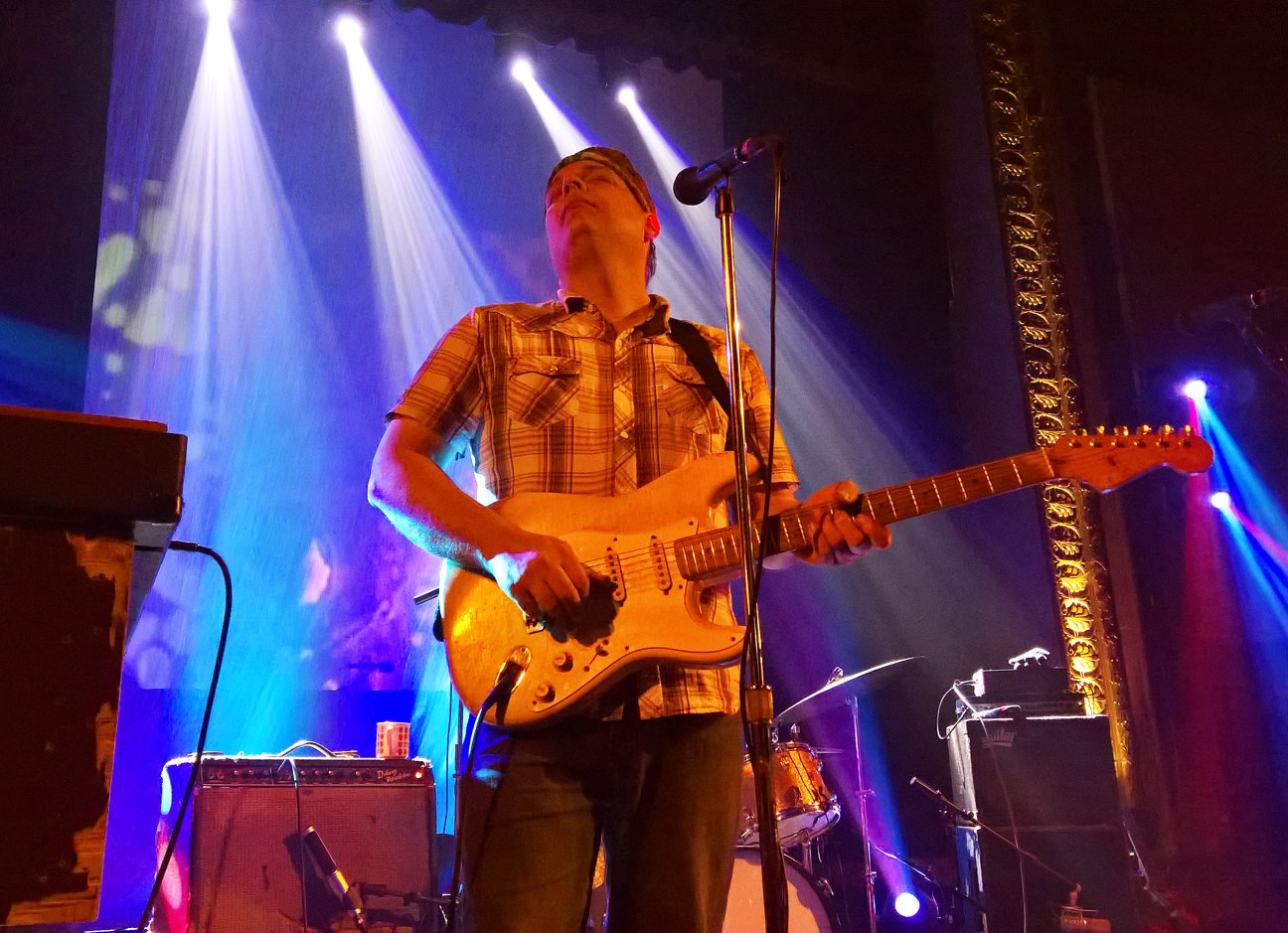
Jeb Puryear

Nevins and Puryear do most of the songwriting.

Past band members include:

- Keyboards: Joe Thrift, Richie Stearns, Kathy Ziegler and Sam Fribush
- Drums: Mark Raudabaugh, Vic Stafford, Tom Gilbert, Shane Lamphier and Jimmy Triplett
- Guitar and frequent vocalist: Jim Miller
- Bass guitar: Bill Reynolds, Kyle Spark, Jay Sanders, Jordon Puryear and Jed Greenberg.

== Discography ==
- The White Tape (1989)
- The Red Tape (1991)
- Donna the Buffalo (a.k.a. The Purple One) (1993)
- The Ones You Love (1996)
- Rockin' In the Weary Land (1998)
- Positive Friction (2000)
- Live From the American Ballroom (2001)
- Life's A Ride (2005)
- Silverlined (2008)
- Tonight, Tomorrow and Yesterday (2013)
- Dance in the Street (2018)
