= The Movement (Rusted Root album) =

Studio album by Rusted Root
- Released: October 30, 2012
- Studio: Red Cloud Studios, Pittsburgh, Pennsylvania, United States; Studio 4, Conshohocken, Philadelphia, Pennsylvania, United States; The Rusted Root tour bus
- Genre: Roots rock, worldbeat
- Length: 47:55
- Language: English
- Label: Shanachie
- Producer: Michael Glabicki

Rusted Root chronology
Stereo Rodeo (2009)	The Movement (2012)

The Movement is the seventh studio album by American roots rock and worldbeat group Rusted Root. The album combines political and spiritual themes in its lyrics, along with a mix of pop music and the band's prior jam band sound. It has received positive reviews from critics.

== Recording and release ==
The songs on this album reflected lead vocalist and songwriter Michael Glabicki's spiritual interests and a response to the Occupy movement. Glabicki initially composed tracks based around grooves and rhythms that he would scat along to until he composed lyrics and could finalize the track; The Movement is also his first time producing. The Movement was supported by a crowdfunding campaign that allowed some backers to come and perform on the album, singing backing vocals and hand clapping.

== Reception ==
The editorial staff of AllMusic Guide scored this album 3.5 out of five stars, with reviewer Thom Jurek noting that the band has found a balance between their pop music tendencies along with their roots and jam band-based grooves, noting that this album is filled with "tight, hook-oriented, accessible numbers adorned in adventurous global percussion and musical modes". In Relix, Frady Khalil also noted that the band "have become good at embracing their musical past, even while moving ahead" with tracks that "giv[e] the album an overall sense of rooted, but forward trajectory".

== Track listing ==
All songs written by Michael Glabicki, except where noted

1. "Monkey Pants" – 4:11
2. "Cover Me Up" – 4:26
3. "The Movement" – 4:14
4. "In Our Sun" (Liz Berlin and Jeff Berman) – 5:21
5. "Fossil Man" – 3:53
6. "Fortunate Freaks" – 4:32
7. "Sun and Magic" – 5:39
8. "Up and All Around" – 4:45
9. "Something's on My Mind" – 5:23
10. "Up And All Around" (Live) – 5:34

== Personnel ==
Rusted Root

- Liz Berlin – vocals, percussion, design, illustration
- Michael Glabicki – lead vocals, acoustic and electric guitar, percussion, engineering, mixing, production
- Colter Harper – baritone and electric guitar, percussion
- Preach Freedom – drums, membranophone, percussion, vocals
- Patrick Norman – bass guitar, vocals, percussion
- Dirk Miller – banjo

Additional personnel

- Jeff Berman – percussion
- Vincent Cifello – hand claps
- Quinn Glabicki – photography
- David Glasser – mastering engineering
- Paul Impellizeri – backing vocals
- Dan Meuner – percussion
- Phil Nicolo – mixing
- Skip Sanders – clavinet, organ, shakers
- Jen Staiman – hand claps
- Vicki Staiman – hand claps
- Lucy Stone – backing vocals
