= Shakori Hills Grassroots Festival =

American biannual music festival

Coordinates: 35.791°N 79.306°W

Shakori Hills GrassRoots Festival of Music and Dance
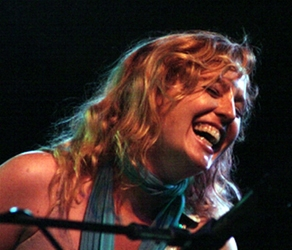
- Singer Tift Merritt performing at Shakori Hills in 2005.
- Genre: Jam band music, world music, bluegrass music, reggae music, americana music, etc.
- Dates: Spring Festival May 7-10, Fall Festival Oct. 1-4
- Location: 1439 Henderson Tanyard Road Pittsboro, North Carolina
- Years active: 2003–present
- Capacity: 9,000
- Website: Shakori Hills GrassRoots Festival of Music and Dnce

The Shakori Hills GrassRoots Festival of Music and Dance is a biannual music and dance festival in the United States, held on the first Thursday thru Sunday in May and October in Pittsboro, North Carolina. The festival takes place on a 75-acre (300,000 m^{2}) venue which is managed by Shakori Hills Community Arts Center Inc. (SHCAC), a nonprofit organization. The festival supports the music and art programs of the SHCAC. It is associated with and modeled after the larger Finger Lakes Grassroots Festival that takes place near Trumansburg, New York each summer. The spring festival started in April 2003 and the fall festival was launched in 2004.

== The Festival ==
The festival typically lasts four days, beginning on Thursday afternoon and going through Sunday night. The venue has two large outdoor stages, one large covered dance tent, the Front Porch Stage for music workshops, a Cabaret Tent, and The Outpost which is specifically programmed with teenagers in mind. 4-Day and single day passes are available. Primitive, vehicle, and RV camping is available for an additional fee.

In addition to the music, the festival has music and dance workshops, a sustainability fair, kids activities, and food and craft vending with local food trucks and artisans. The family-friendly festival is free for children 12 and under and offers a special youth rate for 13–15-year-olds.

Attendance is stronger on Saturday, Friday, and Sunday with Thursday being known as a "locals" night. For those wishing to set up and/or begin camping prior to the festival, Early Camping begins on the Saturday before the music starts. Campers Must purchase Camping for the festival before or upon arrival.

== Music ==
Each festival draws fifty or more bands who play on four stages over four days. Many genres of music are represented, including bluegrass, zydeco, country-western, psychedelic rock, folk rock, reggae, and world music. Past headliners include Del McCoury Band, Lukas Nelson & Promise of the Real, The Wood Brothers, Bela Fleck and the Flecktones, Galactic, Billy Strings, Nahko Bear, Robert Randolph, Yonder Mountain String Band, Donna the Buffalo, Nickel Creek, Keith Frank, Patty Loveless, Toubab Krewe, Steve Earle and the Dukes, and Rising Appalachia.

Band and instrument (mandolin, guitar, fiddle) contests are held with the best band winning a slot on a Sunday stage.

Music starts around 11:00 a.m. and goes late into the evening. Saturday evening is capped by a popular drum circle. People have to bring their own instruments and join in campfire music.

== See also ==
- List of jam band music festivals
