= Finger Lakes GrassRoots Festival of Music and Dance =

Annual festival in Trumansburg, New York

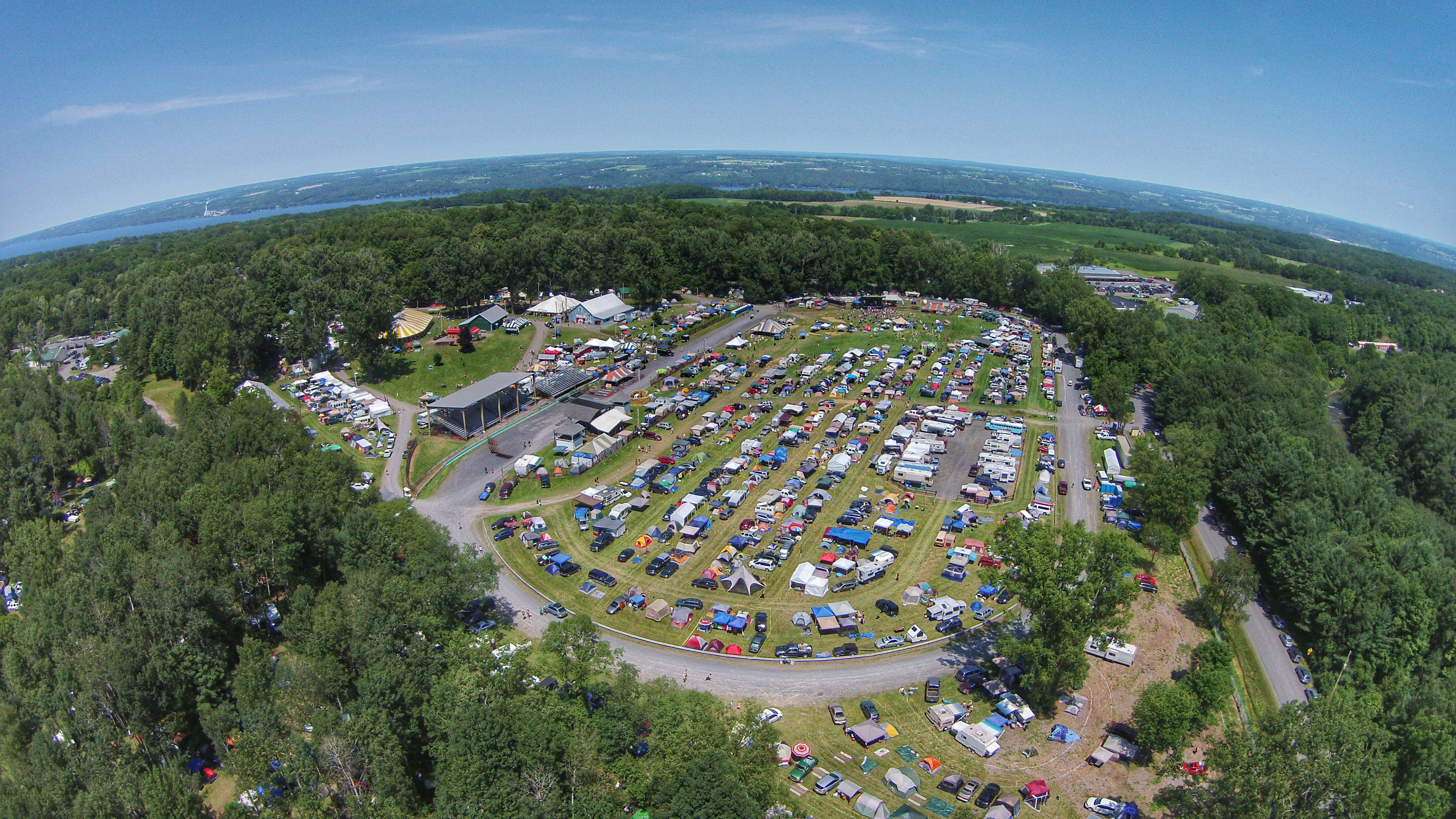
- Aerial photo from 2015.
- Genre: bluegrass, Cajun, zydeco, African, reggae, country, Americana, Native American, old-time music, Irish music, jam band, rock and roll, hip hop, Conjunto, rockabilly
- Locations: Trumansburg, New York, U.S.
- Years active: 1991-present
- Founders: Leslie Puryear, Jordan Puryear, and Jeb Puryear
- Attendance: 15,000
- Website: www.grassrootsfest.org

Started in 1991, the Finger Lakes GrassRoots Festival of Music and Dance is an annual festival held the second-to-last weekend of July in Trumansburg, New York, a small town ten miles north of Ithaca. It takes place on the site of the Trumansburg Fairgrounds.

The GrassRoots Festival, or simply GrassRoots, as it is known, draws nearly 20,000 visitors throughout the course of four days. GrassRoots presents over 70 musicians, bands and dance troupes on four simultaneously running stages continually throughout the long weekend. Genres represented among the musicians include bluegrass, Cajun, zydeco, African, reggae, country, Americana, Native American music, old-time music, Irish music, jam band, rock and roll, hip hop, Conjunto, rockabilly and more.

The festival was nominated as one of USA Today's top 10 outdoor music festivals. In 2003 the associated Shakori Hills Grassroots Festival began, modeled after the Finger Lakes festival.

== Details ==
GrassRoots was founded by popular Americana band Donna the Buffalo and celebrated its twentieth year in 2010. The festival was originally run by the Puryear family and friends, with volunteer assistance bolstering a small staff, henceforth the name of the festival itself.

In addition to the musical performances at GrassRoots, attendees may also visit the Art Barn, an art gallery featuring primarily local artists; a Healing Arts area, where free massages, Reiki, acupuncture, and other healing therapies are performed; a children's area; dance workshops and more. In 2005 a "musicalmentary" about the festival titled Grassroots Stages was distributed nationally on PBS. The film includes musical performances and interviews with festival organizers Jeb and Jordan Puryear.

The festival hosts performances on a series of venues/stages, indoors and outdoors, offering stadium-like open air viewing as well as seating opportunities for the stage known as Grandstand. There is a Dance Tent with musical offerings for Old Time, Bluegrass and Swing interspersed with instructional sessions for learning to dance to certain specific types of music.

Festival camping and parking on-site is first come/first serve and has a history of filling up quickly, meaning that late-comers often have a long walk to the venue from a roadside parking spot.

== See also ==
- List of jam band music festivals
- List of bluegrass music festivals
- Donna the Buffalo
