= Welcome to My Party (album) =

Studio album by Rusted Root
- Released: April 9, 2002
- Genre: Rock
- Length: 47:14
- Label: Island
- Producer: Bill Bottrell

Rusted Root chronology
| Rusted Root (1998) | Welcome to My Party (2002) | Rusted Root Live (2004) |

Singles from Welcome to My Party
- 1. "Welcome to My Party" Released: 2002; 2. "Blue Diamonds" Released: 2002

Welcome to My Party is Rusted Root's fifth studio album. It marked a departure from the tribal grooves of the group's previous work to a poppier sound. Both "Welcome to My Party" and "Blue Diamonds" were released as singles.

== Track listing ==
All songs written by Michael Glabicki except where noted.

1. "Union 7" (Glabicki, Jenn Wertz) – 4:39
2. "Welcome to My Party" – 3:49
3. "Women Got My Money" – 4:38
4. "Blue Diamonds" – 4:56
5. "Weave" (Wertz) – 3:59
6. "Artificial Winter" – 4:17
7. "Too Much" (Liz Berlin) – 4:24
8. "Sweet Mary" – 3:43
9. "Hands are Law" – 4:18
10. "Cry" (Patrick Norman, Glabicki) – 2:52
11. "People of My Village" (Jim Donovan, Glabicki) – 5:39

== Personnel ==
- Michael Glabicki – vocals, guitar
- Jenn Wertz – vocals
- Patrick Norman – bass, vocals
- Liz Berlin – vocals
- Jim Donovan – drums, percussion
- John Buynak – guitar
- John McDowell – keyboards
- Bill Bottrell – producer, Engineer, mixer
- Roxanne Webber – assistant engineer
- Calvin Turnbull – assistant engineer
