= Grey Daze =

American alternative rock band

- Grey Daze in late 1993 to early 1994. Left to right: Steve Mitchell, Jonathan Krause, Chester Bennington, and Sean Dowdell

Background information
- Origin: Phoenix, Arizona, U.S.
- Genres: Grunge; post-grunge; alternative rock; alternative metal
- Years active: 1993–2001; 2017; 2019–present
- Labels: Artemis; Loma Vista
- Members: Sean Dowdell; Cristin Davis; Cris Hodges; Kenny Bulka; Evan Nichols
- Past members: Mace Beyers; Jason Barnes; Bobby Benish; Chester Bennington; Jonathan Krause; Steve Mitchell; Dave Sardegna; Jodi Wendt
- Website: www.greydazemusic.com

Grey Daze is an American rock band from Phoenix, Arizona formed in 1993. They are best known for being one of the first bands of Linkin Park vocalist Chester Bennington. It was co-founded by Bennington and drummer Sean Dowdell, the band's only remaining original member.

== History ==
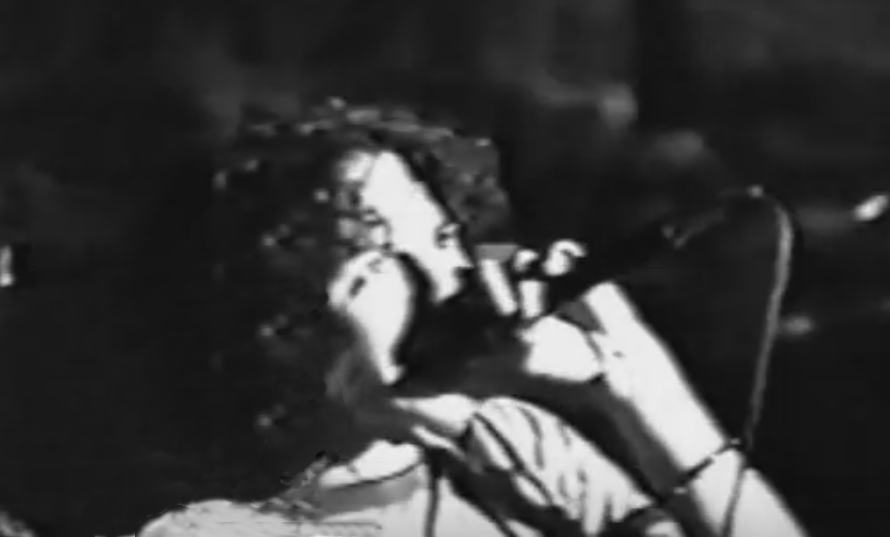
Bennington performing with Grey Daze in 1994

Grey Daze was formed in 1993 by drummer Sean Dowdell alongside Chester Bennington, both previously members of Sean Dowdell and His Friends? in addition to guitarist Steve Mitchell and bassist Jonathan Krause. Although they saw several lineup changes, the band remained together for five years, releasing two full-length albums: Wake Me in 1994 and ...No Sun Today in 1997. In 1998, Bennington and bassist Mace Beyers left the band due to internal conflicts. The band continued for three years longer, but no further recordings were released and the band ultimately disbanded. In 1999, Bennington joined the band Xero, which later became Linkin Park. The band's former guitarist, Bobby Benish, died on September 28, 2004 at the age of 36.

The band remained inactive until a proposed reunion by Bennington in 2017. Due to Bennington's death not long after, the reunion never took place. However, work soon began on what would become the album Amends. The album was eventually finalized and released in June 2020, using Bennington's original vocals on top of re-recorded instrumentation, consisting of original members bassist Mace Beyers and drummer Sean Dowdell, joined by Cristin Davis on guitar, in addition to a number of collaborations with Bennington's friends and family. The album was met with positive reception upon its release and peaked at number 75 on the Billboard 200.

In January 2021, a five-track EP titled Amends...Stripped was released, containing acoustic versions of songs from Amends.

In June 2022, the band released their second full-length album since their return, titled The Phoenix. The album uses Bennington's original vocals similar to Amends. The album contains ten tracks, including singles "Saturation (Strange Love)" and "Starting to Fly" and featured guest appearances from Bennington's daughters Lily and Lila, as well as Dave Navarro of Jane's Addiction and Richard Patrick of Filter. The album received generally positive to mixed ratings.

== Members ==
Current members

- Sean Dowdell – drums, backing vocals (1993–2001, 2017, 2019–present)
- Cristin Davis – guitar (2017–present)
- Cris Hodges – lead vocals (2023–present)
- Kenny Bulka – guitar (2024–present)
- Evan Nichols – bass (2024–present)

Past members

- Jason Barnes – guitar (1994–1995, 2017)
- Bobby Benish – guitar (1995–2001; died 2004)
- Chester Bennington – vocals (1993–1998, 2017; died 2017)
- Mace Beyers – bass (1995–1998, 2017, 2019–2024)
- Jonathan Krause – bass (1993–1995)
- Steve Mitchell – guitar (1993–1994)
- Dave Sardegna – bass (1998–2001)
- Jodi Wendt – vocals (1998–2001)

== Discography ==
Album	Album details	Peak chart positions						
Album	Album details	AUS	AUT	GER	SWI	UK	UK Rock	US
Wake Me	Released: October 1994; Formats: CD,	—	—	—	—	—	—	—
...No Sun Today	Released: May 23, 1997; Formats: CD,	—	—	—	—	—	—	—
Amends	Released: June 26, 2020; Formats: CD, LP, download, streaming	30	29	9	17	62	1	75
The Phoenix	Release: June 17, 2022; Format: CD, LP, download, streaming	—	—	27	87	—	—	—
"—" denotes a recording that did not chart or was not released in that territory.

=== EPs ===
- Amends...Stripped (2021)
- #ForYouChester (2022)
- More Than I Can Offer (2026)

==== Singles ====
Title	Year	Peak chart positions			Album
Title	Year	US Main.	US Rock	US Rock Air.	Album
"What's in the Eye?"	2020	—	—	—	Amends
"Sickness"	2020	2	35	11	Amends
"Sometimes"	2020	—	—	—	Amends
"Soul Song"	2020	—	40	—	Amends
"B12"	2020	29	—	—	Amends
"Anything, Anything"	2021	—	—	—	The Phoenix
"Saturation (Strange Love)"	2022	—	—	—	The Phoenix
"Starting to Fly"	2022	—	—	—	The Phoenix
"Drag"	2022	—	—	—	The Phoenix
"Fake Little Lies"	2025	—	—	—	TBA
"Still Screaming"	2025	—	—	—	TBA
"Shadows"	2025	—	—	—	TBA
"Monster You Adore"	2026	—	—	—	TBA
"More Than I Can Offer"	2026	—	—	—	TBA

==== Music videos ====
Year	Title	Director	Album
2020	"What's in the Eye"	Zev Deans	Amends
2020	"Sickness"	Nico Poalillo and Brandon Rottman	Amends
2020	"Soul Song"	Jaime Bennington	Amends
2020	"B12"	Marc Silverstein	Amends
2020	"In Time"	Daniel Silva and Danilo Silgepe	Amends
2020	"Shouting Out"	Daniel Silva and Danilo Silgepe	Amends
2022	"Saturation (Strange Love)"	Marc Silverstein	The Phoenix
2022	"Starting to Fly"	Heidi Gadd	The Phoenix
2022	"Drag"	Heidi Gadd	The Phoenix
2025	"Fake Little Lies"	Aramis Duran	TBA
2025	"Shadows"	Cristin Davis and Aramis Duran	TBA
2026	"Monster You Adore"	Cristin Davis and Aramis Duran	TBA
2026	"More Than I Can Offer"	Cristin Davis and Aramis Duran	TBA
