= Peacefield (band) =

American indie rock band

- Genre: Americana (music)
- Label: Frogville Records
- Members: Don Glatz, Jeffrey Glatz, Paul Manz, Marc Utter, R. Bruce Phillips, Brent Martin
- Past members: Brad Snyder, Mike Ofca, Paul Spencer, Shane Leasure, Jamie Hook, Mark Reiser, Rob Zelinsky, Chris Livingstone, A.J. Abbott, Jesse Cravens, Cory Bell
- Website: http://peacefieldtx.com/

Peacefield is an American band, originally from Pittsburgh and later based in San Antonio.

== History ==
The band began in suburban Pittsburgh, with Jeff and Don Glatz, singer-songwriter brothers and pals, raised in a big family with influences including cops, comic books, the love of music, and classic TV. After a four-song demo EP, Peacefield recorded their first full-length CD, Narragansett (Green Sun Records). Critics gave positive reviews to the indie endeavor, and a song from the album was selected for Guide Wire Radio, which featured unsigned artists and was broadcast nationwide.

Peacefield played shows with 10,000 Maniacs, early Goo Goo Dolls, and Vigilantes of Love, receiving airplay on radio stations in Pittsburgh, Washington DC, Cleveland and New York.

Peacefield's follow-up, Curses & Calamity (King Mouse Records), was produced by Mike Ofca and Greg Joseph of The Clarks. The song "Warmer Side Of The Street" was featured in the motion picture Kingpin, and their track "Little Mistress" was featured in the PBS documentary The Class of 2000.

In late 2006, Jeff and Don Glatz moved to the Hill Country, just outside San Antonio, Texas. With a new lineup of backing musicians, they began playing some live shows, and released the six-song EP Feeling Dull, which met with local success and positive reviews.

Peacefield chose producer Bill Palmer of Frogville Records for its next album, Stars Away. Pittsburgh City Paper reviewer Andy Mulkerin described the album as ""Well-written, lyrically driven tunes that largely avoid cliché; a worthy entry into the alt-country field." Robert Bartosh, of Roots Music Report, called it "unblemished" and "ingeniously performed" with "a new feel that is unconventional and captivating."

In 2016, Jeff Glatz took a break from the band to release a solo record, entitled Multiverse.

== Members ==
- Jeffrey Glatz: Vocals, Songwriter, Guitars, Percussion
- Don Glatz: Vocals, Songwriter, Guitars, Harmonica, Percussion
- Paul Manz: Electric guitar
- Marc Utter: Bass
- R. Bruce Phillips: Organs, Keys
- Brent Martin: Drums

== Discography ==
- Narragansett (Green Sun Records)
- Curses and Calamity (King Mouse Records)
- Feeling Dull (Smokin Coyote Records ) EP
- Stars Away (Frogville Records)
