= Amends (album) =

Studio album by Grey Daze
- Released: June 26, 2020
- Recorded: 1994–1997 (vocals); 2017–2019 (instruments)
- Studio: Salt Mine Studios; NRG Recording Studios
- Genre: Grunge; alternative rock
- Length: 37:16
- Label: Loma Vista
- Producer: Jay Baumgardner; Rene Mata

Grey Daze chronology
...No Sun Today (1997)	Amends (2020)	The Phoenix (2022)

Singles from Amends
- 1. "What's in the Eye" Released: January 16, 2020; 2. "Sickness" Released: February 6, 2020; 3. "Sometimes" Released: April 3, 2020; 4. "Soul Song" Released: May 15, 2020; 5. "B12" Released: June 12, 2020

Professional ratings
Aggregate scores
Source	Rating
Metacritic	79/100
Review scores
Source	Rating
AllMusic	4/5 stars

Amends is the third studio album by American rock band Grey Daze, consisting of Chester Bennington's vocals from the 1990s over newly recorded instrumentals. "What's in the Eye" was released as the first single from the project on January 17, 2020, and was co-produced by Chris Traynor, Kyle Hoffman, and Jay Baumgardner. The second single, "Sickness", featuring Page Hamilton and produced by Pete Nappi, came out on February 6. The release of the album was postponed from April 10 to June 26 due to the COVID-19 outbreak.

== Background ==
Tentatively titled New Sun Tomorrow, the project was started in February 2017. The album was announced in June by bassist Mace Bayers as a remaster of ...No Sun Today, and it would be produced by Sylvia Massy. The band had previously tried to release a remastered version of the album through Artemis Records in 2003; however, conflicts with lawyers within Linkin Park's label Warner prohibited the release.

The original versions of Grey Daze's debut album, Wake Me, and ...No Sun Today, were also available on iTunes up to 2005, before they were removed. Linkin Park's discography arrived to the digital store in 2006. News about the album came with the announcement of a Grey Daze reunion show at the Marquee Theatre in Tempe, Arizona. According to drummer Sean Dowdell, it was Bennington's idea to put the band together for a Club Tattoo 20th-anniversary party, and they had started getting offers to play at festivals all over the world.

Jason Barnes, who played guitar on Wake Me, was announced as part of the band's lineup for the show and was seen recording in the studio. They had just started to strip the masters down and re-track the guitars when the project was put on hold following Bennington's sudden death on July 20. Members of Grey Daze and Dead by Sunrise/Julien-K teamed up for a special acoustic performance on September 2 at the Saxe Theater in Las Vegas, in Bennington's honor. "The Down Syndrome" and two Dead by Sunrise songs were performed, with Ryan Shuck on vocals.

== Writing and recording ==
Grey Daze was given permission by Bennington's widow, Talinda, to continue working on the project provided that they didn't change Chester's voice. In late December 2017, Massy confirmed that the sessions would resume. According to her, the music would be modernized for the current market using master tapes recorded in the late 1990s. However, the band did not move forward with her, and Jason Barnes was absent from the project after 2017. The band reached out to former Warner executive Tom Whalley to release the album through his Loma Vista Recordings label.

Dowdell said, "We reverse engineered a lot of the music. We took all the music away, we kept the vocal track and the lyrics that was there – that was all Chester. We kept the integrity and the intention of all of the vocals, intact from its original inception. We actually rewrote all of the music to every single song from the ground up." They worked on Bennington's vocals for two months before tackling the music. Writing the instrumentals took about a year and half, and recording took almost another year and a half. Besides Bennington's original vocals from Wake Me and ...No Sun Today, previously unreleased alternate takes were also used on the songs.

The band worked at Salt Mine Studios and NRG Recording Studios with several musician friends of Bennington or artists that he loved, which included Ryan Shuck (Julien-K), Marcos Curiel (P.O.D.), Jaime Bennington (Chester's son), Chris Traynor (Bush), Brian "Head" Welch and James "Munky" Shaffer (Korn), Laura Pergolizzi (LP), Carston Dowdell and Brennen Brochard (Sean's sons), Carah Faye (Shiny Toy Guns), Jasen Rauch (Breaking Benjamin, Love and Death, ex-Red), and Pete Nappi (Ocean Park Standoff). They also had Esjay Jones and Lucas D'Angelo (Betraying the Martyrs) on the production team.

On June 9, 2019, Grey Daze confirmed they had wrapped up the project; by August, they had mixed the album. Draven Bennington was also asked to sing on the album but declined, because it was difficult for him to listen to his father's voice at the time.

== Track listing ==
All tracks are written by Grey Daze.

Original release
No.	Title	Length
1.	"Sickness"	2:52
2.	"Sometimes"	3:27
3.	"What's in the Eye"	3:26
4.	"The Syndrome"	3:50
5.	"In Time"	3:55
6.	"Just Like Heroin"	3:26
7.	"B12"	3:34
8.	"Soul Song"	4:06
9.	"Morei Sky"	3:53
10.	"She Shines"	3:35
11.	"Shouting Out"	3:20
Total length:		37:16

Japan bonus tracks
No.	Title	Length
12.	"What's in the Eye" (acoustic)	3:27
13.	"Sometimes" (acoustic)	3:21
Total length:		46:12

Japan deluxe edition bonus DVD
No.	Title	Length
1.	"Behind the scenes #1"	0:49
2.	"Behind the scenes #2"	1:28
3.	"Grey Daze Documentary"	8:09
4.	"Track by Track"	10:21
5.	"What's in the Eye" (music video)	3:25
6.	"Sickness" (music video)	2:48
Total length:		73:12

== Note ==
- Tracks 9, 10, 11 appeared on Wake Me
- Tracks 1, 4, 5, 6, 7, 8 appeared on ...No Sun Today
- Tracks 2 and 3 appeared on both Wake Me and ...No Sun Today

== Credits ==
Grey Daze

- Chester Bennington – vocals
- Mace Beyers – bass
- Cristin Davis – guitar
- Sean Dowdell – drums, backing vocals

Additional credits

- A&R – Rene Mata, Ryan Whalley, Tom Whalley
- Art direction – Mike Lythgoe
- Artwork – Cristin Davis, Mace Beyers, Sean Dowdell
- Additional vocals – Carah Faye (track 4), Jaime Bennington (track 8), Laura Pergolizzi (track 11), Esjay Jones (track 6)
- Additional drums – Brennen Brochard (track 7), Carston Dowdell (track 4)
- Additional guitar – Brian Welch (tracks 7, 10), Chris Traynor (tracks 2, 3, 6, 8), James Shaffer (track 7), Jasen Rauch (track 10), Marcos Curiel (track 3), Page Hamilton (track 1), Ryan Shuck (track 5)
- Piano – Jean-Yves D'Angelo (tracks 8, 9)
- Keyboards – Jamie Muhoberac (tracks 2, 6)
- Strings – Heidi Gadd (tracks 8, 9)
- Drum programming – Daniel Pampuri
- Coordinator – Diana Ciobotea
- Engineer – Adam Schoeller, Andrea Roberts, Andy Kipnes (track 7), Tenni Gharakhanian (track 7)
- Executive producer – Jay Baumgardner, Rene Mata
- Co-producer – Grey Daze
- Legal – Jeff Worob
- Photography – Jim Louvau, Kerry Rose, Mark Silverstein, Mike Walliser, Rene Mata, SAKIphotography, Sean Hartgrove, Tom Preston
- Additional producers – Alex Aldi (track 7), Cass Dillon (track 11), Chris Traynor (tracks 2, 3, 6), Esjay Jones (tracks 4, 6, 8, 9, 10), Kyle Hoffmann (tracks 2, 3), Lucas D'Angelo (tracks 4, 6, 8, 9, 10), Lucio Rubino (track 5), Pete Nappi (track 1)
- Mastering – Ted Jensen
- Mixing – Jay Baumgardner
- Recording – Kyle Hoffmann
- Technician – John Nicholson, Mark Daughney
- Lyrics – Chester Bennington, Sean Dowdell

== Charts ==
Chart performance for Amends
Chart (2020)	Peak position
Australian Albums (ARIA)	30
Austrian Albums (Ö3 Austria)	29
Belgian Albums (Ultratop Flanders)	163
Belgian Albums (Ultratop Wallonia)	51
French Albums (SNEP)	127
German Albums (Offizielle Top 100)	9
Italian Albums (FIMI)	94
Scottish Albums (OCC)	29
Swiss Albums (Schweizer Hitparade)	17
UK Albums (OCC)	62
UK Rock & Metal Albums (OCC)	1
US Billboard 200	75
US Top Alternative Albums (Billboard)	5
US Top Hard Rock Albums (Billboard)	2
US Top Rock Albums (Billboard)	9
