= Gunnar Gehl =

American singer-songwriter

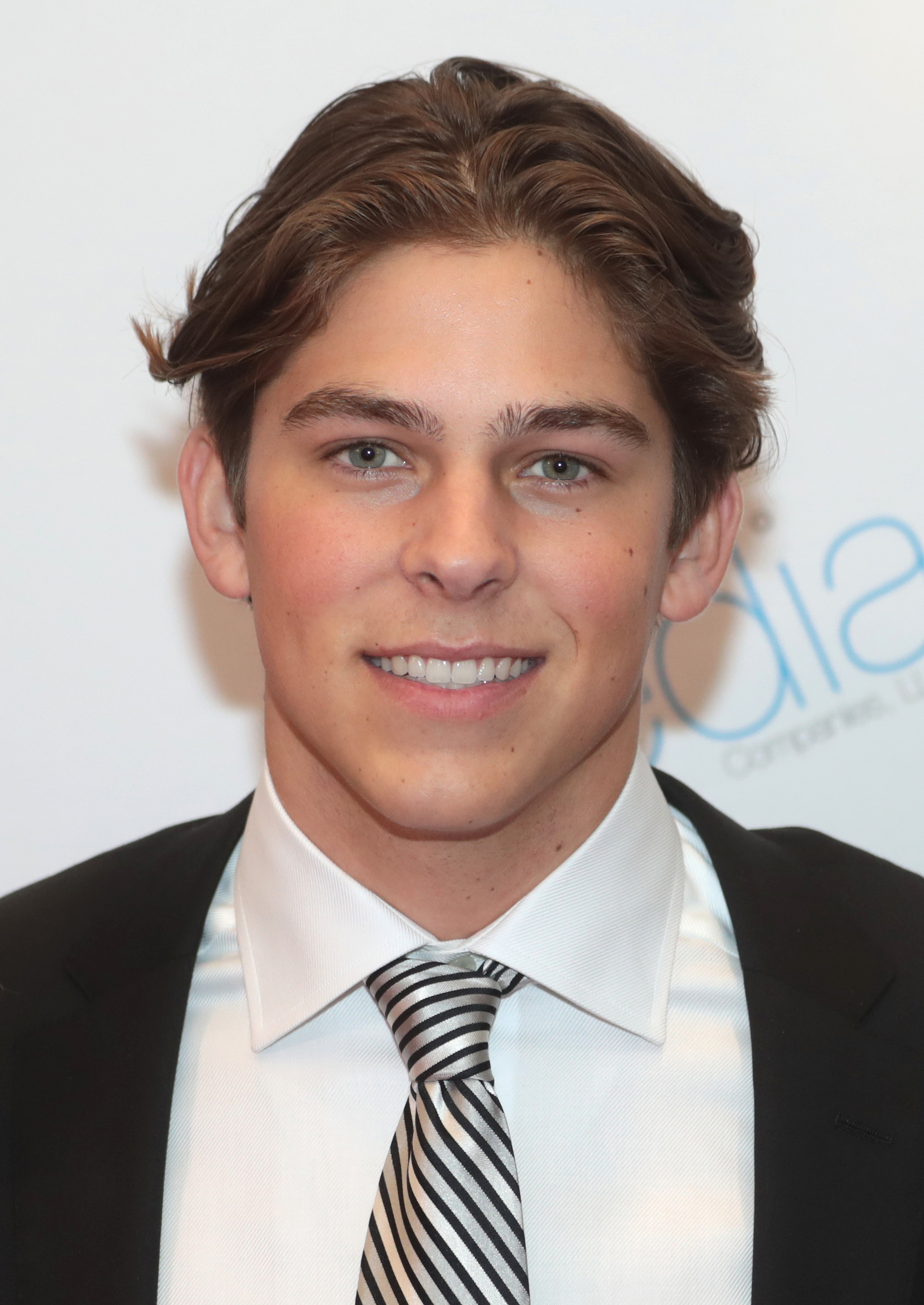

Background information
- Also known as: Gunnar
- Born: Gunnar Patrick Gehl; April 23, 2001 (age 25); Newport Beach, California, U.S.
- Genres: Pop
- Occupation: Singer-songwriter
- Instruments: Guitar, vocal
- Years active: 2017–present
- Website: gunnargehl.com

Gunnar Patrick Gehl, also known as Gunnar (stylized in all caps), is an American singer-songwriter. He released his debut single "Ocean Blue" in October 2018. Gehl was the opening act of PrettyMuch's North American Funktion Tour. His first EP, One Second of One Day, was released in October 2020, and his debut album, Best Mistake, was released in February 2023.

== Biography ==
He first started playing the guitar at the age of seven. At the same age, he started playing on his grandfather's piano.

== Career ==
=== Music ===
Gehl started his music career playing in local bands and as a solo artist. He later recorded at a local studio where he met other artists including PrettyMuch. He was the opening act for all 22 dates on PrettyMuch's North American Funktion Tour. Gehl's debut single "Ocean Blue" was released in October 2018 and gained 100,000 streams on Spotify within three weeks of its release. It was one of the first songs that Gehl wrote outside of Newport. He worked in Los Angeles with producer Julian Fefel. Before releasing "Ocean Blue", Gehl had posted covers and original songs including "Change" and "Time Stands Still" on SoundCloud and Instagram. A highly-anticipated EP was released in 2020, One Second of One Day. He has stated that modern technology has had a largely beneficial impact on the music industry, making it easier for listeners to find music. He frequently uses technology in music production, including to write down lyrics while writing songs. He sings covers of Shawn Mendes, Justin Bieber, Khalid, Billie Eilish, and Juice Wrld. He plans on releasing more covers by these artists and other artists such as Why Don't We.

=== Philanthropy ===
Gehl began working the WE Charity organization in 2014 where he has spoken at events and performed with a Kenyan Boys’ Choir. He was invited to the board of the organization in 2017. In February 2018, Gehl performed at WE Day Texas, along with Johnny Orlando and MKTO. He sang the song "Change". As part of the charity, Gehl travels to Africa and helps young students. He has traveled to Africa twice and also to India. He donates ten percent of the proceeds from his music career to the organization. He also performed his single "For Your Love" at WE Day UK in 2020 in front of 12,000 people.

== Artistry ==
Gehl describes his sound as alternative, urban, and pop. He stated in an interview with Asymmetric Magazine that he likes to use electric or acoustic guitar mixed with modern beats and melodies. L'Officiel describes Gehl's music as having an "accessible yet dense sound." He has been compared to Shawn Mendes, but Gehl cites John Mayer and Bruno Mars as his biggest inspirations. Emina Lukaranin of Billboard describes his music as catchy and "flirty pop" while Taylor Weatherby called Gehl an "urban singer-songwriter". Digital Journal calls Gehl a teen pop sensation. Gehl reported that he would like to collaborate with Dua Lipa. Fox 2 Detroit describes his voice as "soulful".

== Discography ==
=== Albums ===
- Best Mistake (2023)
- Sunfaded (2025)

=== EPs ===
- One Second of One Day (2020)

=== Singles ===
- "Ocean Blue" (2018)
- "Outta My Mind" (2018)
- "For Your Love" (2020)
- "Can't Say No" (2020)
- "Dance Alone" (2021)
- "Somewhere We Can Be Alone" (2021)
- "She's In My Head" (2021)
- "Cinnamon" (2022)
- "They Didn't Tell Me" (2022)
- "Fuck a Broken Heart" (2023)
- "Again & Again" (2023)
- "Dirty Blonde" (2024)
- "This Is Now" (2024)

== Tours ==
- Upside Down Tour (2025)

=== Opening act ===
- Funktion Tour (2018)
- WE Day (2019)
- Maroon 5 UK + Europe Tour (2023)
