= The Dip (band) =

American band

- Origin: Seattle, WA
- Genres: indie pop; rhythm and blues
- Years active: 2013–present
- Labels: Colemine Records; Dualtone Records
- Members: Tom Eddy; Jarred Katz; Mark Hunter; Brennan Carter; Levi Gillis; Evan Smith
- Website: www.thedipmusic.com

The Dip is a funk and rhythm and blues band that was formed in 2013 by music students at the University of Washington in Seattle. The band combines a typical pop instrumentation with a 3-part horn section. They have released three full-length albums as well as two instrumental EPs.

== History ==
Band members Jarred Katz, Mark Hunter and Tom Eddy shared a house near the University of Washington, where they would work together as members of the electropop band Beat Connection, occasionally joined by their friend Jacob Lundgren. A trio known as the Honeynut Horns (Brennan Carter, Evan Smith, and Levi Gillis) lived across the alley and would play jazz songs on their balcony. The two groups came together to form The Dip.

The band was initially created to play house parties at the University of Washington in order to provide the band members, all jazz music students, an opportunity to play more mainstream music. They recorded an EP in their room in 2013 and played their first gig at Barboza in Seattle at the end of that summer.

In 2015 the band released their self-titled first album, then followed that up with the instrumental album Won't Be Coming Back the following year. In 2019 they released their second full-length album The Dip Delivers, which was recorded in a studio they built for themselves, and in 2020 they released a second instrumental EP The Dip Plays It Cool. In 2021 the band signed with Dualtone Records and released a new single Paddle To The Stars, followed by the full-length album Sticking With It in March 2022.

The band has played several music festivals and also embarked on longer tours, including a 2019 tour of Europe with Durand Jones & The Indications as well as a tour of Japan. Although they had to cancel a 2020 tour due to the pandemic, they toured North America in 2022, including some dates supporting Lake Street Dive and a performance at the Bonnaroo Music Festival. Their touring continued in 2023, beginning in Kansas City on February 15 and culminating with a planned appearance at the Bumbershoot festival in Seattle.

== Current members ==
- Tom Eddy – lead vocals, guitar
- Jarred Katz – drums
- Mark Hunter – bass guitar
- Brennan Carter – trumpet
- Levi Gillis – tenor saxophone
- Evan Smith – baritone sax

== Former members ==
- Jacob Lundgren – lead guitar
- Sam Hylton – keyboards

== Discography ==
=== Albums ===
List of albums
Title	Album details	Peak chart positions
Title	Album details	US Sales
The Dip	Released: April 14, 2015; Label: Self-Released	-
The Dip Delivers	Released: February 7, 2019; Label: Self-Released	-
Sticking With It	Released: March 4, 2022; Label: Dualtone Records	31
Love Direction	Released: July 12, 2024; Label: Dualtone Records	-

=== Instrumental Albums ===
List of instrumental albums
Title	Album details
Won't Be Coming Back (EP)	Released: May 5, 2016; Label: Colemine Records
The Dip Plays It Cool (EP)	Released: October 16, 2020; Label: Self-Released
