= Send Me on my Way =

Single by Rusted Root

from the album Cruel Sun and When I Woke
- Released: 1994
- Recorded: 1992
- Genre: Worldbeat; alternative rock; acoustic rock; folk-pop; jangle pop
- Length: 4:33 (Cruel Sun version); 4:19 (When I Woke version)
- Label: Mercury; PolyGram
- Songwriters: Michael Glabicki; Liz Berlin; John Buynak; Jim Dispirito; Jim Donovan; Patrick Norman; Jennifer Wertz
- Producers: Dave Brown (Cruel Sun version); Bill Bottrell (When I Woke version)

Rusted Root singles chronology
"Send Me on my Way" (1994)	"Ecstasy" (1995)

Music video
- "Send Me on my Way" Video on YouTube

"Send Me on my Way" is a song by American worldbeat rock band Rusted Root. Originally released as a rough version on 1992's Cruel Sun, it was re-mixed in 1994 for their second album, When I Woke, and released as the lead single. Root's frontman, Michael Glabicki, wrote the lyrics, and its other members – Liz Berlin, John Buynak, Jim Dispirito, Jim Donovan, Patrick Norman, and Jennifer Wertz – contributed to the track. It peaked at number 72 on the Billboard Hot 100.

== Critical reception ==
Critical reception has been mixed. In January 2014, in a review for Cruel Sun, Kurt Keefner said that "the African vocal riff from 'Send Me on My Way' is bad Ladysmith Black Mambazo", whereas Chris Baker of Syracuse.com said "The song's pep and lightheartedness is undoubtedly responsible for its success. Unlike the fervor found in songs like 'Ecstasy' or 'Lost in a Crowd,' 'Send Me on My Way' is unbridled optimism – perfect for a children's movie."

== Music video ==
Directed by Sean Alquist, the music video was filmed in the badlands of South Dakota in late 1994.

== Charts ==
Chart performance for "Send Me on my Way"
Chart (1995)	Peak position
Radio and Records Pop	39
US Billboard Hot 100	72

== Certifications ==
Certifications for "Send Me on my Way"
Region	Certification	Certified units/sales
New Zealand (RMNZ)	3× Platinum	90,000^{‡}
United Kingdom (BPI) Sales since 2004	2× Platinum	1,200,000^{‡}
^{‡} Sales+streaming figures based on certification alone.

== In popular culture ==
Despite not being an immediate commercial success, it has since become an "iconic track of the 1990s", mainly due to its prominence in several movies and TV series, including Pie in the Sky, Matilda, Party of Five, Ice Age, Race the Sun, The Theory of Flight, Eddsworld, Standing Still, Maid, New Girl, Big Mouth and Rick and Morty.

Nature Valley and Enterprise Rent-A-Car have used the song in their ads.

NASA engineers chose "Send Me on my Way" as "wake up" music for the Mars Exploration Rover Opportunity, for Sol 21.

Because of its use in popular culture, frontman Glabicki has said that the song has "become a different thing for us. It's this thing that lives next to us. Everyone has a great memory or connection with the song. The song grew up and now has a life of its own; it's bigger; we get to sit back and watch it."
