= Ripe (American band) =

American funk and pop band

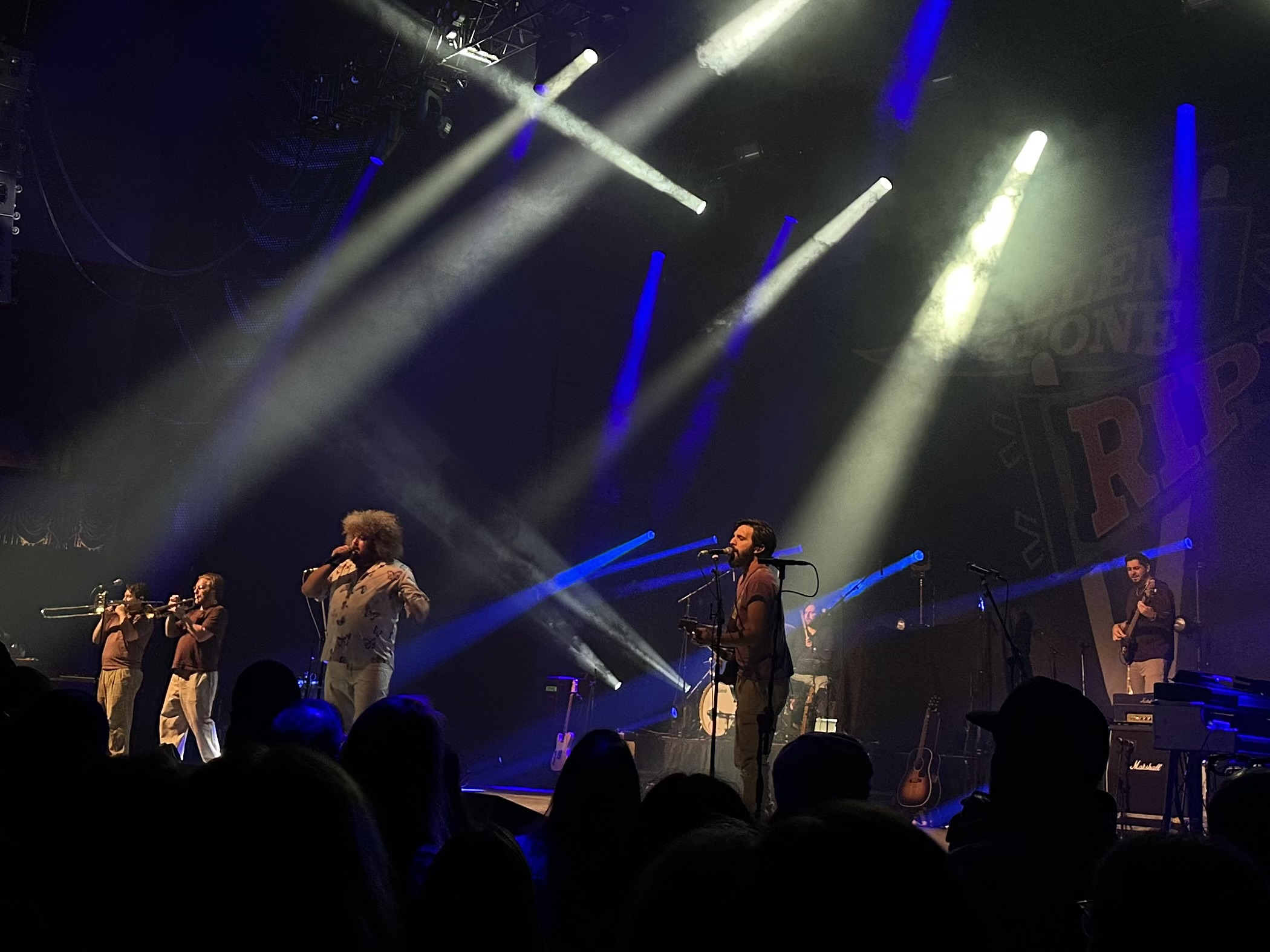
- In concert, 2025

Background information
- Origin: Boston, Massachusetts
- Genres: Alternative pop; funk; pop rock; alternative rock
- Years active: 2011–present
- Label: Glassnote
- Members: Robbie Wulfsohn; Jon Becker; Sampson Hellerman; Calvin Barthel; Christian Yogi Saint-Louis
- Past members: Tory Geismar; Josh Shpak; Nadav Shapira
- Website: ripetheband.com

Ripe is an American funk and alt pop band. Originally from Boston, the band is based in Los Angeles. Led by frontman Robbie Wulfsohn, the band also consists of guitarist Jon Becker, drummer Sampson Hellerman, bassist Christian Yogi Saint-Louis, and trombonist Calvin Barthel.

== History ==
=== Formation and early years (2011–2017) ===
The band formed in 2011 as a six-piece group while its members were attending the Berklee College of Music. Drummer Sampson Hellerman and lead guitarist Tory Geismar had moved together from New York to Boston, where Berklee is located. There they met Robbie Wulfsohn, who would become Ripe's lead vocalist, as well as guitarist Jon Becker, and Josh Shpak and Calvin Barthel. The latter two feature on the band's horns, on trumpet and trombone, respectively. For a short time, the band was called "Produce the Juice", but after coming up with other "organic-sounding names" they finally settled on Ripe.

Hellerman recounted that he and Geismar did not dorm, and instead roomed together in an apartment but "quickly realized [they] had no idea how to meet people." As a result, they hosted open door parties; Wulfsohn attended the first of these parties, and the three of them "sat down and did a little jam," writing a song that they uploaded to SoundCloud. Wulfsohn had left his hometown of Toronto to attend Berklee. He lived on the same floor as Becker, as well as Maxwell Stofman, who became the band's manager. Due to being fascinated with funk, the band sought out a horn player and hired Josh Shpak as their trumpeter. Shpak brought along trombonist Calvin Barthel with him.

In 2014, Ripe gained online attention as a result of a live-performance video recording of their song "Goon Squad" going viral on the "r/listentothis" subreddit. Later, in 2015, Nadav Shapira would join the band as its bassist.

Prior to releasing their debut studio album in 2018, Ripe's reputation was built primarily through live performances as their output prior to 2018 saw a total of ten songs released.

=== Joy in the Wild Unknown (2018) ===
In the midst of touring, Ripe released their debut studio album Joy in the Wild Unknown on April 6, 2018. On it, they collaborated with Cory Wong, who was behind the board. Joe Visciano was also brought on the album as a mixer, and Randy Merrill worked on its mastering.

In 2020, Ripe embarked on a tour.

=== Bright Blues (2022–2023) ===
In 2022, the band released the single "Settling". The band released their second album Bright Blues in 2023, their first through Glassnote Records. Noah Conrad and Ryan Linvill served as producers and co-writers on the album. During the year, the band also performed on their "Bright Blues" Tour.

In November 2023, Ripe released a live album, Live from MGM Music Hall at Fenway.

=== Play the Game (2025) ===
Their third album Play the Game was released on September 19, 2025. It was produced by Joe Chiccarelli. The album also features Lawrence (band) on the opening song "Letting Go" and Cory Wong on "Strangers".

== Musical style and influences ==
Ripe's music style has been self-described as alt-pop, with Wulfsohn stating "what we make is music you can dance to. We're drawn to the peak of a song — the emotional catharsis when everything comes out. It's all about reaching that moment. The revelation comes back to us when bodies shake with joy."

The band is also often associated with funk and dance music, and has been described as "neo-soul" by The Boston Globe. Jazz and R&B are also genres that the band is known for incorporating into their sound. Gwen Egan of Boston.com wrote that the band has an "infectious blend of pop, funk, and rock".

Earth, Wind & Fire has been noted as one of the band's influences. Becker stated that the band also models their sound after Miles Davis.

== Band members ==
Current members

- Robbie Wulfsohn – lead vocals (2011–present)
- Jon Becker – guitar (2011–present)
- Sampson Hellerman – drums (2011–present)
- Calvin Barthel – trombone (2011–present)

Former members

- Tory Geismar – guitar
- Josh Shpak – trumpets
- Nadav Shapira – bass guitar

== Discography ==
Stand Alone Singles:

- On My Mind (2017) [Cover of the original by Ellie Goulding ]
- Five in the Morning (2020)
- First Time Feeling (2020)
- Little Less Polite (2020)
- Backup (2020)

EPs:

- Produce the Juice (2013)
- Hey Hello (2015)
- Ripe on Audiotree Live (2016)

Studio albums:

- Joy in the Wild Unknown (2018)
- Bright Blues (2023)
- Play the Game (2025)

Live albums:

- Live From the MGM Music Hall at Fenway (2023)
- Brooklyn Paramount (2026)
