= Rusted Root =

American rock band

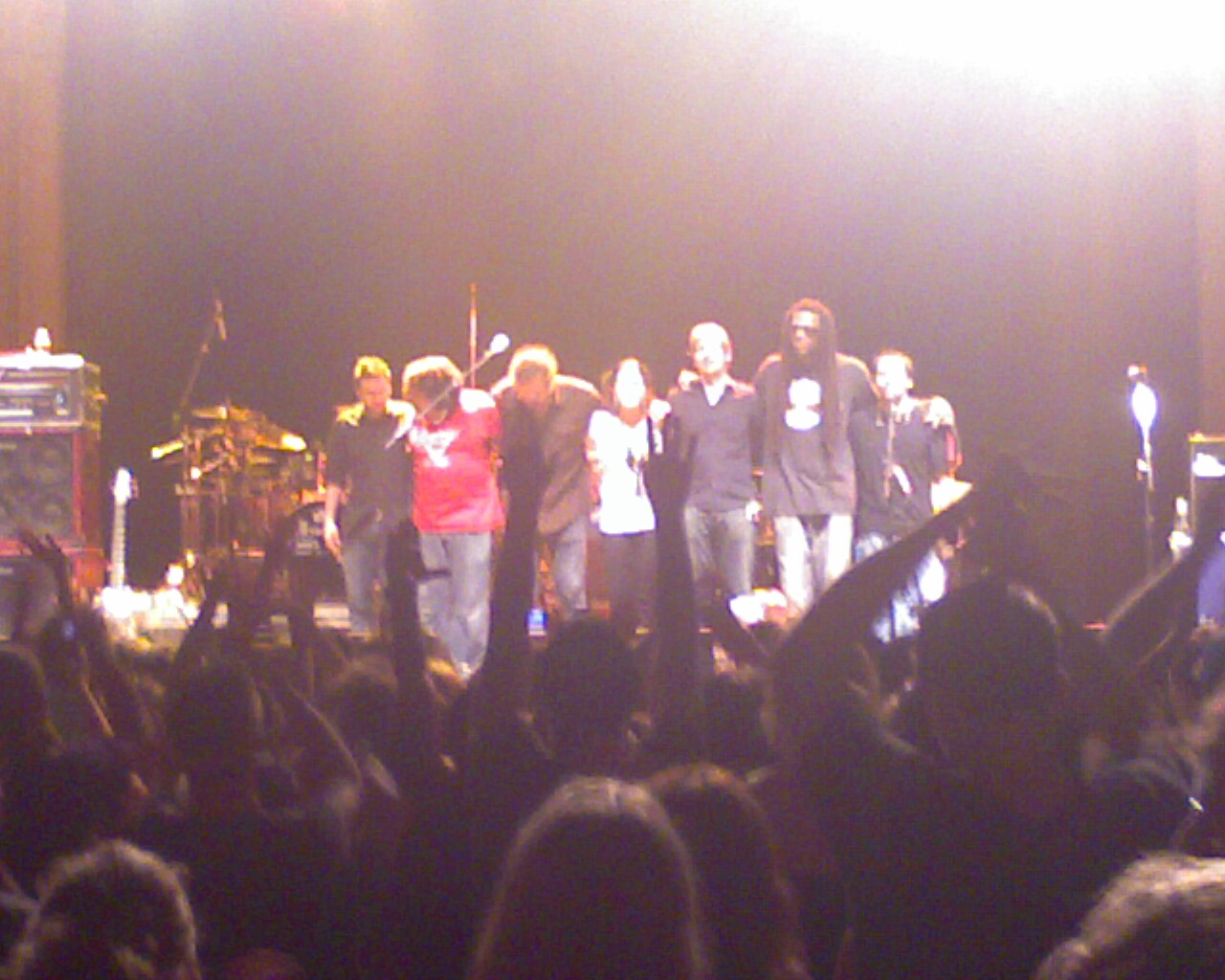
- Rusted Root in 2008

Background information
- Origin: Pittsburgh, Pennsylvania, U.S.
- Genres: Roots rock, worldbeat, alternative rock, jam band, folk
- Years active: 1990–2015 (indefinite hiatus)
- Labels: Mercury; Island; Touchy Pegg; Shanachie; Adrenaline Music
- Members: Michael Glabicki; Patrick Norman; Liz Berlin
- Past members: Jim DiSpirito; Jim Donovan; Jenn Wertz; John Buynak; Ethan Winograd; Preach Freedom; Colter Harper; Jason Miller; Cory Caruso; Dirk Miller
- Website: rustedroot.com

Rusted Root is an American worldbeat rock band formed in the year 1990 in Pittsburgh, Pennsylvania by Michael Glabicki (vocals, guitar); Patrick Norman (bass); Liz Berlin (percussion); Jim Donovan (drums); Jenn Wertz (vocals, percussion); John Buynak (guitar, mandolin, pennywhistle); and Jim DiSpirito (percussion). The band achieved fame in 1994 with its platinum-selling album When I Woke, which included the hit single "Send Me on My Way". The song has been featured prominently in many films and commercials. Rusted Root has sold more than three million albums. After releasing The Movement in 2012 and touring through 2015, the band went on an indefinite hiatus, with principal songwriter and vocalist Michael Glabicki forming the group Uprooted with former members of Rusted Root and continuing to tour with that group into the early 2020s. The band's music incorporates elements of rock with percussion and influences from various musical traditions. Its lineup has changed over the course of the band's history, with Glabicki remaining a central member of the group.

== Musical style and influences ==
The band's style is a fusion of acoustic, rock, world and other styles of music, with a strong percussion section that draws from African, Latin American, Indian and Native American influences. Michael Glabicki has acknowledged the popular success of Peter Gabriel's 1986 album So as an influence on his decision to incorporate worldbeat into his own music. The band's lyrical content varies but often talks about Christianity and Judaism. The group's 2012 album, The Movement, was fan funded.

== Members ==
=== Current members ===
- Michael Glabicki – lead vocals, guitar, harmonica, mandolin (1990–present)
- Patrick Norman – bass guitar, backing vocals, percussion
- Liz Berlin – vocals, percussion

=== Past members ===
- Jim Donovan – drums, percussion (1990–2005)
- Jenn Wertz – backing vocals, percussion (1990–2008)

== Discography ==
=== Studio albums ===
Year	Album	Peak chart positions		Certifications	Record label
Year	Album	Billboard 200	Heatseekers Albums	Certifications	Record label
1992	Cruel Sun	—	—		
1994	When I Woke	51	1	RIAA: Platinum	Mercury
1996	Remember	38	—	RIAA: Gold	Mercury
1998	Rusted Root	165	—		Mercury
2002	Welcome to My Party	129	—		Island
2009	Stereo Rodeo	—	—		Adrenaline Music
2012	The Movement	—	—		Shanachie
"—" denotes a recording that did not chart or was not released in that territory.

=== Live albums ===
- Rusted Root Live (2004)

=== Compilations ===
- The Best of Rusted Root: 20th Century Masters - The Millennium Collection (2005)

=== Extended plays ===
- Rusted Root (1990)
- Christ Monkey (1991)
- Live (1995)
- Evil Ways (1996)
- Airplane (1998)

=== Singles ===
Year	Song	US Hot 100	Certifications
1994	"Send Me on My Way"	72	BPI: Platinum
1995	"Ecstasy"	—	
1996	"Evil Ways"	—	
1996	"Faith I Do Believe"	—	
1996	"Who Do You Tell It To"	—	
1996	"Virtual Reality"	—	
1996	"Sister Contine"	—	
1998	"Magenta Radio"	—	
2002	"Welcome to My Party"	—	
"—" denotes releases that did not chart.
