= Jim Donovan (musician) =

American musician (born 1968)

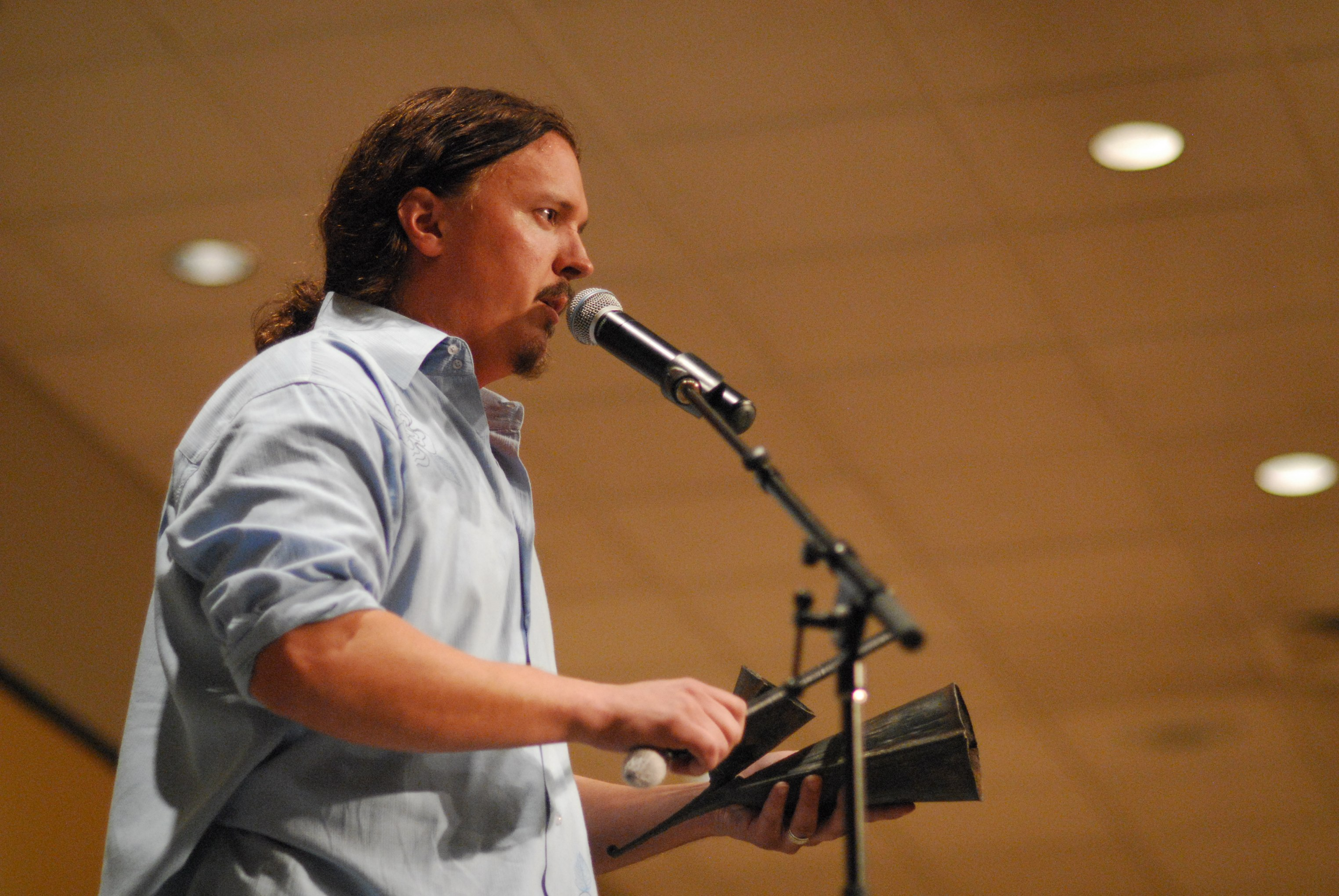
- Donovan lecturing in 2010

Background information
- Born: March 10, 1968 (age 58)
- Occupations: Drummer, percussionist
- Instrument: Drums

Jim Donovan (born March 10, 1968) is an American professional drummer and percussionist, best known as the former drummer and one of the founding members of the band Rusted Root. He is also the author of the book Drum Circle Leadership: Learn to Create and Lead Your Own Transformational Drum Circles.

== Education ==
Donovan studied and played African rhythms with various master drummers such as Congolese master drummer Elie Kihonia, Mamady Keita and Mbemba Bangoura. He also studied African music with noted scholar Kwabena Nketia from Ghana. He holds a B.A. in Music Performance from the University of Pittsburgh and a Masters of Educational Leadership from Saint Francis University where he is an instructor in the university's Fine Arts Program and the director of both the university's World Drumming Ensemble and Arts in the Mountains Festival.

Donovan's CD Revelation #9 was nominated for 2004 Electronica Album of the Year by Just Plain Folks Songwriters organization. He was named winner of the 2008 Best Drum Circle Facilitator award, and was a nominee for 2008 Best Percussion Performance in Drum! Magazine.

== Discography ==
- 1998 – Indigo: Music for Exploration Volume 1 (Triloka)
- 2000 – Pulse: Music for Exploration Volume 2
- 2000 – Rhythm and Drumming Vol.1 (Play along CD)
- 2001 – Rhythm & Drumming Vol. 2 (Play-along CD)
- 2004 – Revelation #9
- 2005 – Live on Earth (For A Limited Time Only) – Krishna Das (Triloka)
- 2006 – Drum the Ecstatic International Live
- 2006 – The Yoga of Drum and Chant
- 2006 – Rhythmic Foundation Volume 1 Instructional audio CD
- 2006 – Rhythmic Foundation Volume 2 Instructional audio CD

=== Instructional DVD ===
- 2007 – Jim Donovan's Rhythmic Foundation: Interactive African Drumming for Everyone Volume 1 DVD

=== With Rusted Root ===
- 1994 – When I Woke (Mercury/Universal)
- 1996 – Remember (Mercury/Universal)
- 1996 – Evil Ways (Mercury/Universal)
- 1998 – Rusted Root (Mercury/Universal)
- 2002 – Welcome to My Party (Island)
- 2003 – Cruel Sun (Touchy Pegg)
- 2004 – Rusted Root Live (Touchy Pegg)
- 2005 – 20th Century Masters – The Millennium Collection: The Best of Rusted Root (Mercury/Universal)

== See also ==
- Sun King Warriors
