= Thursday at the Square =

Weekly concert series in Buffalo, New York

Coordinates: 42.8857°N 78.8738°W

John Butler Trio performing at Thursday at the Square in August 2007

Thursday at the Square was a free weekly concert series held annually from May through August at Lafayette Square in Buffalo, New York.

== History ==
Thursday at the Square was first held in 1987. The concert series was produced by Buffalo Place and was originally held in Fountain Plaza. The event was later relocated to Lafayette Square. In 2016, Thursday at the Square was renamed to Thursday & Main and moved back to Fountain Plaza.

== Performers ==
=== 1991 ===
- 6/13 - The Mamas & the Papas featuring John Phillips, MacKenzie Phillips, Spanky McFarlane and Scott McKenzie
- 6/20 - Billy McEwen & the Soul Invaders
- 6/27 - Sattalites
- 7/04 - (no show)
- 7/11 - Rocket 88
- 7/18 - Lance Diamond
- 7/25 - The Hurricanes
- 8/01 - Jamie Moses Band
- 8/08 - The Pine Dogs
- 8/15 - The Ravens featuring Barbara St. Clair
- 8/22 - Emory Nash
- 8/29 - Gamalon
- 9/05 - The Road

=== 1992 ===
- 6/04 - The Guess Who
- 6/11 -
- 6/18 - Billy McEwen & the Soul Invaders
- 6/25 - John & Mary
- 7/02 - Hopping Penguins
- 7/09 - Them Jazzbeards
- 7/16 -
- 7/23 - J.C. Thompson Band
- 7/30 - The Fibs
- 8/06 -
- 8/13 - The French Ticklers
- 8/20 - Joyryde
- 8/27 - Sattalites

=== 1993 ===
- 6/03 - Sattalites
- 6/10 - Pulse with Butch Rolle, Unity Band with Cynthia Moore and Lisa Rushton
- 6/17 -
- 6/24 - Goo Goo Dolls, Lance Diamond
- 7/01 - Bel-Vistas, Skaface, (or The Lowest of the Low?)
- 7/08 -
- 7/15 - One Drop Reggae
- 7/22 -
- 7/29 - Heat Handlers
- 8/05 - Where's Broadway, Outer Circle Orchestra
- 8/12 - Moxy Früvous, John & Mary
- 8/19 - Blue Rodeo, Crash Roosters
- 8/26 - Pat Shea & the Stone Country Band, Rick Smith

=== 1994 ===
- 6/02 - Jamie Moses Band, Nik and the Nice Guys
- 6/09 - Big Happy Family, Johny Vegas
- 6/16 - Mr. Conrad & the Excellos, Billy McEwen & the Soul Invaders
- 6/23 - Pine Dogs, Skydiggers
- 6/30 - Tropical Explosion
- 7/07 - Crash Rooster, Tinsley Ellis
- 7/14 - McCarthyizm, The Waltons
- 7/21 - Dance or Die, Hypnotic Clambake
- 7/28 - The Need, Hall of Fame Band
- 8/04 -
- 8/11 - Wild Nik West, Stevie Ray Shannon
- 8/18 - Crumbs of Insanity, Pigfarm
- 8/25 -

=== 1995 ===
- 6/01 - Billy McEwen & the Soul Invaders
- 6/08 - 10,000 Maniacs with John Lombardo and Mary Ramsey, The Skeptics
- 6/15 - Otis Rama & the Shama Lama Nik Dongs, Outer Circle Orchestra
- 6/22 -
- 6/29 - Boss Street Band, Planet 9 with Kathy Moriarty
- 7/06 -
- 7/13 - Morganfields, Plaster Sandals
- 7/20 - Downchild Blues Band, Willie & the Reinhardts with Dave Constantino
- 7/27 - Coupe de Villes, Win, Lose or Draw Band
- 8/03 - Nullstadt, The Tails
- 8/10 -
- 8/17 - Marshall Badger Band, Willie May Blues Band
- 8/24 - Jim Yeomans Band, Dee Dee Tompkins
- 8/31 - Straight Forward, Bobby Militello Quartet

=== 1996 ===
- 5/30 - Chuck Negron of Three Dog Night
- 6/06 - Spirit of the West, Philosopher Kings
- 6/13 - Veltri & Morgano Rhythm & Soul Revue, De'Riff
- 6/20 - Jump Kings, Hit N'Run
- 6/27 - LeeRon Zydeco & the Hot Tamales, J.C. Thompson Band
- 7/03 - (Wednesday) Willie and The Reinhardts play when John Cafferty and the Beaver Brown Band cancel, C.P.R. Band with the Perpetrators
- 7/11 - Buckwheat Zydeco, Gamalon
- 7/18 - Lance Diamond, Surfivors
- 7/25 - Universal Honey, Roadside Attractions
- 8/01 - Taylor Made Jazz, The Shaft
- 8/08 - Bobby Militello Quartet, Phil Sims & the Buffalo Brass Band
- 8/15 - All Stars of Southern Rock featuring the Tolar Brothers, Scott Carpenter & the Real McCoys
- 8/22 - Ominous Sea Pods, McCarthyizm
- 8/29 - The Sattalites, Billy McEwen & the Soul Invaders

=== 1997 ===
- 5/29 - Boys of Summer, Big Wheelie & the Hubcaps
- 6/05 - Echo & the Bunnymen, Velour
- 6/12 - Electric Chick Magnets, C.O. Jones
- 6/19 - Plaster Sandals, McCarthyizm
- 6/26 - Chanka Chank Cajun Zydecko Band
- 7/03 - Barbara St. Clair & the Shadows
- 7/10 - Moxy Früvous
- 7/17 - Spirit of the West, Johnny Hart & the Jumpstarts
- 7/24 - The Be Bops, Gary Lewis & the Playboys
- 7/31 - Lance Diamond, Scott Carpenter & the Real McCoys
- 8/07 - Buffalo Swing, Michael Civisca
- 8/14 - Buckwheat Zydeco, Pine Dogs
- 8/21 - Only Humen, Billy McEwen & the Soul Invaders
- 8/28 - Coupe De Villes, Clarence "Gatemouth" Brown

=== 1998 ===
- 5/28 - Switch, Flipside & the Legends of Rock-n-Roll
- 6/04 - Moxy Früvous, Skydiggers
- 6/11 - Mary Black, McCarthyizm
- 6/18 - Squeeze, Saw Doctors
- 6/25 - Molly Hatchet, N.Y. Rockn' Rodeo Band
- 7/02 - Reggae Cowboys, Electric Bushmen
- 7/09 - The Grass Roots, Fat Brat
- 7/16 - Buckwheat Zydeco, Skin Tight Band
- 7/23 - Great Big Sea, Michael Oliver & Go Dog Go
- 7/30 - Billy McEwen & the Soul Invaders, Stone Bridge Band
- 8/06 - Lance Diamond, The Shadows with Barbara St. Clair
- 8/13 - Blue Rodeo, Scary Chicken
- 8/20 - Sass Jordan, Dolly Watchers
- 8/27 - Popa Chubby, Danny Lynn Wilson

=== 1999 ===
- 5/27 - 54-40, Riley, By Divine Right
- 6/03 - The Flutie Brothers Band, R&B Revue
- 6/10 - Ron Hawkins and the Rusty Nails, The 7th Sons, Leon & The Forklifts
- 6/17 - Shawn Mullins, John Whelan
- 6/24 - Great Big Sea, Go Dog Go, Guster
- 7/01 - Lance Diamond, Wendell Rivera & The Latin Jazz All-Stars
- 7/08 - Paul Revere and the Raiders, Tom Stahl
- 7/15 - Kelly Willis, Steam Donkeys
- 7/22 - Billy McEwen & The Soul Invaders, Junction West
- 7/29 - Reverend Horton Heat, 53 Days, Irving Klaws
- 8/05 - The Marshall Tucker Band, Tommy Z
- 8/12 - Fighting Gravity, Bread Gone Wry, bag.
- 8/19 - Spirit of the West, Alison Pipitone, Universal Honey
- 8/26 - Spyro Gyra, Straight Forward

=== 2000 ===
- 5/25 - Black 47, Jackdaw, Mudtown Rudy
- 6/01 - Tugboat Annie
- 6/08 - Moist, The Sheila Divine, OUI-73
- 6/15 - Robert Cray
- 6/22 - The Animals
- 6/29 - 54-40
- 7/06 - Blue Rodeo, Tara McLean, Alison Pipitone
- 7/13 - Kim Mitchell
- 7/20 - Burning Spear
- 7/27 - Sister Hazel The Pat McGee Band
- 8/03 - Leahy
- 8/10 - Billy McEwen, Stone Ridge, The Swillberries
- 8/13 - George Thorogood & The Destroyers - Buffalo Place Rocks the Harbor
- 8/17 - Medeski Martin & Wood
- 8/24 - Bruce Cockburn, Willie Nile
- 8/31 - Lance Diamond, C.O. Jones

=== 2001 ===
- 5/24 - The Mighty Mighty Bosstones, The Imports, Mexican Cession
- 5/31 - Andy Griggs, The Steam Donkeys
- 6/07 - Kim Mitchell, Urban Renewal Band, Willie and the Reinhardts
- 6/14 - Jeff Healey Band, The Tommy Z Blues Power Trio
- 6/17 - Slash's Snakepit - Buffalo Niagara Guitar Festival
- 6/21 - moe., DJ Logic
- 6/28 - English Beat, Femi Kuti
- 7/05 - Billy McEwen, Cruizin' Deuces, The Stone Bridge Band
- 7/12 - David Wilcox, Alison Pipitone, Tom Stahl
- 7/19 - Bo Diddley, Animal Planet
- 7/26 - The Sheila Divine, The Push Stars, Crash Test Dummies
- 8/02 - Eddie Money, Rufus Maneuvers, The Swillberries
- 8/09 - Pat Benatar, Seven Day Faith, Blue Bullet Skater
- 8/16 - Great Big Sea, Jennifer Marie, Jackdaw
- 8/23 - Lance Diamond, C.O. Jones
- 8/30 - Donna the Buffalo, The Waz, Soulive

=== 2002 ===
- 5/23 - Cowboy Junkies, Suzanne Vega
- 5/30 - Blood Sweat and Tears, with David Clayton-Thomas
- 6/06 - The Divine Comedy, Ben Kweller, Ben Folds
- 6/13 - The Tommy Z Band, Rik Emmett
- 6/20 - Mark Stanley Band, The Filter Kings, Marcia Ball
- 6/27 - Jackdaw, Spirit of the West
- 7/11 - Jazz Mandolin Project, Derek Trucks Band
- 7/18 - Original Skin, Bob Fera Band, The Smithereens
- 7/25 - Junction West, Average White Band
- 8/01 - One World Tribe, Maxi Priest
- 8/08 - Klear, Lake Trout, Cracker
- 8/15 - Don McLean, Tom Stahl & the Dangerfields, Leah Zicari
- 8/22 - Katie Miller, Redheaded Stepchild, They Might Be Giants When the final group (They Might Be Giants) was set to perform, the show was cancelled due to heavy rains.
- 8/24 - The Lowest of the Low, Universal Honey, McCarthyizm, Last Conservative - Buffalo Place Rocks the Harbor
- 8/25 - Peter Frampton, The Billy McEwen Band, Animal Planet, The Stone Bridge Band - Buffalo Place Rocks the Harbor
- 8/29 - CO Jones, Lance Diamond

=== 2003 ===
- 5/29 - Living Colour, Antigone Rising, LP
- 6/05 - The Mighty Mighty Bosstones, Voodoo Glow Skulls, Pietasters, Catch 22
- 6/12 - Kim Mitchell
- 6/19 - 54-40, Luther Wright and the Wrongs
- 6/26 - Default, Finger Eleven
- 7/03 - Gord Downie & the Country of Miracles, Hawksley Workman
- 7/10 - Government Mule play because Robert Randolph & the Family Band couldn't make it, Jeffrey Gaines
- 7/17 - They Might Be Giants
- 7/24 - Reel Big Fish, Gob, Zebrahead, The Matches
- 7/26 - The Tea Party - Buffalo Place Rocks the Harbor
- 7/27 - Foreigner, David Wilcox, Tom Stahl & the Dangerfields, Willy and the Reinhardts - Buffalo Place Rocks the Harbor

NOTE: Cancelled due to severe weather

- 7/31 - North Mississippi All Stars, David Wilcox

NOTE: David Wilcox performance was moved to 7/31 from originally scheduled date of 7/27. Flogging Molly was to have been the headliner, but their performance was moved to a nearby indoor venue (and a $5 fee charged) to accommodate the switch of the [David Wilcox]concert.

- 8/07 - G. Love & Special Sauce
- 8/14 - Aimee Mann, Martin Sexton
- 8/21 - Max Creek
- 8/28 - April Wine, Honeymoon Suite
- 9/04 - Sarah Slean, Universal Honey

=== 2004 ===
- 5/27 - Sam Roberts, The Clarks, Scott Celani
- 6/03 - Black 47, Blackie and the Rodeo Kings, Tom Stahl and the Dangerfields
- 6/10 - Fuel, Seven Day Faith, Magna-Fi
- 6/17 - Kim Mitchell, Anjulie, Agent Me
- 6/24 - Robert Randolph and the Family Band, The Tommy Z Band
- 7/01 - Blue Rodeo, Universal Honey, Old Sweethearts
- 7/08 - The Fabulous Thunderbirds, Willie & the Reinhardts
- 7/15 - Spirit of the West, Enter the Haggis, Andy Mac
- 7/22 - Leon Russell, Billy McEwen Band
- 7/29 - Arrested Development, Lazlo Hollyfeld
- 8/05 - Broken Social Scene, John Brown's Body (Sound Tribe Sector 9 was originally slated but cancelled and replaced with BSS)
- 8/12 - Vince Neil, Sanity, Last Days of Radio
- 8/19 - Gavin DeGraw, Toby Lightman, Marc Broussard
- 8/26 - Southside Johnny and the Asbury Jukes, Universal Grille
- 9/02 - Klear (featuring Robby Takac), Last Conservative, Juliet Dagger

=== 2005 ===
- 5/26 - Southside Johnny and the Asbury Jukes, Gamalon
- 6/02 - Theory of a Deadman, Submersed
- 6/09 - Karl Denson's Tiny Universe, The Dears, Marjorie Fair, Jon Nicholson
- 6/16 - Howie Day, Stephen Kellogg and the Sixers
- 6/23 - Eric Burdon & The Animals, Cock Robin, Dollywatchers
- 6/30 - Little Feat, Stone Bridge Band
- 7/07 - Sarah Harmer, Hothouse Flowers, Maria Sebastian
- 7/14 - Dr. John, Leeron Zydeco & The Hot Tamales
- 7/21 - G. Love and Special Sauce, State Radio
- 7/22 - moe. - Buffalo Place Rocks the Harbor
- 7/23 - Hootie & The Blowfish - Buffalo Place Rocks the Harbor
- 7/28 - The Lowest of the Low, The Marble Index
- 8/04 - Lou Gramm, Willie Nile
- 8/11 - Great Big Sea, Stand
- 8/18 - John Waite, McCarthyizm
- 8/25 - The Sam Roberts Band, Matt Mays & El Torpedo
- 9/01 - Spin Doctors

=== 2006 ===
- 5/25 - Big Bad Voodoo Daddy, BeArthur
- 6/01 - Smash Mouth, Army of Me, Agent Me
- 6/08 - Mike Doughty's Band, Stephen Kellogg and the Sixers
- 6/15 - Soulive, Bedouin Soundclash
- 6/22 - Blues Traveler, Carbon Leaf
- 6/29 - 54-40, The Trews
- 7/06 - India.Arie, Eric Crittenden, Lazlo Hollyfeld
- 7/13 - Jeff Martin, Burning Paris
- 7/20 - Shooter Jennings, The Brakes
- 7/27 - Robert Randolph and The Family Band, Drive-By Truckers (Aqualung and Lazlo Hollyfeld were replaced for unknown reasons)
- 7/29 - Buddy Guy, Kelley Hunt, Grace Potter and the Nocturnals - Buffalo Place Rocks the Harbor
- 7/30 - Gov't Mule, David Gogo - Buffalo Place Rocks the Harbor
- 8/03 - Violent Femmes, Stand, Mark Norris and the Backpeddlers
- 8/10 - Yonder Mountain String Band, Down To The Roots
- 8/17 - Donna the Buffalo, Tea Leaf Green
- 8/24 - Sloan, The Alison Pipitone Band, Johnny Nobody
- 8/31 - Eric Burdon and the Animals, Tom Stahl & the Dangerfields, The Ifs

=== 2007 ===
- 5/31 - Umphrey's McGee, Tea Leaf Green
- 6/07 - Son Volt, Just Jinjer, Dali's Ghost
- 6/14 - Augustana, Army of Me, As Tall As Lions
- 6/21 - Violent Femmes, Mobile, theRev
- 6/28 - Joan Osborne, Will Hoge
- 7/05 - Sam Roberts Band, Grace Potter and the Nocturnals
- 7/12 - An evening with moe.
- 7/19 - Nickel Creek, Glen Phillips
- 7/26 - Old 97's, Yonder Mountain String Band
- 8/02 - John Butler Trio, Melissa Ferrick
- 8/09 - Keller Williams, Jonah Smith
- 8/16 - Soul Asylum, The Alternate Routes
- 8/23 - North Mississippi Allstars, The Wood Brothers
- 8/30 - The Dirty Dozen Brass Band, Benevento-Russo Duo
- 9/06 - The Romantics, Stephen Kellogg and the Sixers
- 9/13 - Anders Osborne, Charlie Hunter Trio
- 9/20 - Dropkick Murphys, Jackdaw

=== 2008 ===
- 5/30 - Galactic, The New Deal
- 6/05 - The Disco Biscuits
- 6/12 - Yonder Mountain String Band
- 6/19 - David Sanborn Group, Gamalon
- 6/26 - Kevin S. McCarthy, Mike Doughty Duo
- 7/03 - Jakob Dylan and the Gold Mountain Rebels
- 7/10 - Jimmie Vaughan, JJ Grey & MOFRO
- 7/17 - Mickey Hart Band, Tea Leaf Green
- 7/24 - The Gin Blossoms, Common Kings, Dan Erickson
- 7/31 - Spirit of the West, Babik, Penny Whiskey
- 8/07 - Zappa plays Zappa, The Whigs
- 8/14 - Mike Gordon, Samantha Sollenwerth
- 8/15 - Great Big Sea - Buffalo Place Rocks the Harbor
- 8/16 - Robert Cray Band, Keb' Mo' - Buffalo Place Rocks the Harbor
- 8/21 - Saliva, Klear
- 8/28 - Candlebox, Agent Me
- 9/04 - Big Head Todd and the Monsters, Indigenous

=== 2009 ===
- 5/28 - Gomez, Steel Train, Alberta Cross
- 6/04 - The Disco Biscuits
- 6/11 - Robert Randolph & The Family Band, The Dana Fuchs Band
- 6/18 - Better Than Ezra, Tyrone Wells
- 6/25 - Los Lobos
- 7/02 - Zappa Plays Zappa
- 7/09 - Los Lonely Boys
- 7/16 - George Clinton & Parliament/Funkadelic
- 7/23 - Neko Case *cancelled
- 7/30 - The Avett Brothers, Cornmeal

=== 2010 ===
- 6/10 - Alejandro Escovedo, Tift Merritt
- 6/17 - Ingrid Michaelson, A.A. Bondy, Rob Falgiano
- 6/24 - Martin Sexton, Ryan Montbleau Band
- 7/01 - Ed Kowalczyk of Live
- 7/08 - Ozomatli, Rebelution
- 7/15 - Umphrey's McGee, Tea Leaf Green
- 7/22 - G. Love & Special Sauce
- 7/29 - Robert Randolph and the Family Band, The London Souls
- 8/05 - Los Lobos, JJ Grey & MOFRO
- 8/12 - The Fabulous Thunderbirds, Hit N Run and Will Holton

=== 2011 ===
- 6/02 - Edward Sharpe and the Magnetic Zeros, The Son of the Sun, The Etchings
- 6/09 - Morris Day and the Time, The Missing Star, Autopunch
- 6/16 - Blues Traveler with special guest, Willie Nile, The Pillagers
- 6/23 - Grace Potter and the Nocturnals with special guest, Fitz and the Tantrums, Southside

June 30 - August 4: Erie Canal Harbor Central Wharf

- 6/30 - The Lowest of the Low with special guest, Hey Rosetta!, Ron Hawkins and the Do Good Assassins
- 7/07 - Sloan, Johnny Nobody, The Found
- 7/14 - Court Yard Hounds, Alison Pipitone Band, Rob Falgiano Band
- 7/21 - Southside Johnny and the Asbury Jukes, Jamie Moses Band, The Tommy Z Band
- 7/28 - George Clinton & Parliament-Funkadelic, Taylor Made, The Rod Nickson Project
- 8/04 - Tokyo Police Club with special guest, The Sheila Divine, Potter's Field
