= John & Mary =

American folk rock duo

- John & Mary

Background information
- Origin: Buffalo, New York, United States
- Genres: Folk, folk rock
- Years active: 1989–present
- Label: Rykodisc
- Members: John Lombardo; Mary Ramsey

John & Mary is a United States–based folk rock duo featuring John Lombardo and Mary Ramsey, both members of alternative rock band 10,000 Maniacs.

== History ==
=== 1989–1993 ===
John & Mary was formed by John Lombardo and Mary Ramsey soon after they first met in Buffalo, New York in December 1989. Lombardo, one of the founding members of 10,000 Maniacs and responsible for much of their early sound, had left the band in 1986 due to "creative and political" differences. The pair signed with Rykodisc in 1990 and recorded their first album Victory Gardens which was released in 1991, and were the opening act for the Maniacs on the Time Capsule Tour in late 1990. They followed up with their second release, The Weedkiller's Daughter, also on Rykodisc, in 1993.

=== 1994–2000 ===
Both joined (or re-joined) the Maniacs as full-time members in 1994 after Natalie Merchant's departure. The duo released two albums with the Maniacs, 1997's Love Among the Ruins, which contained a cover of the Roxy Music song "More Than This" that reached number 25 on the U.S. Hot 100 chart, and 1999's The Earth Pressed Flat. Lombardo and Ramsey continued to perform occasionally as John & Mary between tours. After the death of the Maniacs' lead guitar player Rob Buck in December 2000, the Maniacs went on hiatus, following which, Ramsey was replaced with singer Oskar Saville from the Chicago-based band Rubygrass. Lombardo quit the group at the same time.

=== 2001–2006 ===
After leaving 10,000 Maniacs, John & Mary began work on a new album in 2001. The Pinwheel Galaxy was released in December 2002 and the duo began a ten date national tour to promote it. The two performed locally around Buffalo regularly from 2002 to 2006. Ramsey was rehired by 10,000 Maniacs as a viola player and backing vocalist for the 2006 shows with Oskar Saville and returned to the lead vocalist spot after the departure of Saville in 2007.

=== Since 2007 ===
In late 2006, John & Mary began working with a new backing band, the Valkyries, made up of some of the best local Buffalo musicians, and their latest album, Peace Bridge was released the following year. Lombardo and Ramsey both have continued to appear regularly with 10,000 Maniacs during 2008 to 2017 as well as doing regular shows as John & Mary with the Valkyries.

== Band members ==
- John Lombardo – Lombardo, an original member of 10,000 Maniacs, co-wrote most of the early Maniacs songs, but left the band in 1986. He returned in 1994 with Mary Ramsey, and picked up where he left off by writing and shaping the band's music for two albums, Love Among the Ruins (1997) and The Earth Pressed Flat (1999). He left the band again in 2002 and returned as a touring member in 2015.
- Mary Ramsey – Ramsey opened up 10,000 Maniacs shows with John Lombardo as John & Mary in 1990, and played viola and sang backing vocals with the Maniacs on a few songs in 1990 to 1991. She was a touring musician with the band in 1992 to 1993, playing viola and singing backing vocals. When Natalie Merchant left 10,000 Maniacs in 1993, Ramsey replaced her on lead vocals and added the viola as a main instrument of the band, starting with live shows in 1994 and continuing on until 2001. Oskar Saville replaced her as lead singer in 2002, but Ramsey again became a touring musician with the band in 2006, singing backing vocals and playing viola on select songs. She was lead singer for the band again for their final show of 2007 after Oskar Saville left the band and continues in that role.
- The Valkyries – the initial line up in 2006 and on their 2007 release Peace Bridge included Patrick Kane on lead guitar, Rob Lynch on drums, Joe Rozler on keyboards, Nelson Starr on keyboards, and Kent Weber on bass guitar.

== Discography ==
=== John & Mary ===
- Victory Gardens (1991)
- The Weedkiller's Daughter (1993)
- The Pinwheel Galaxy (2002)

=== John & Mary & the Valkyries ===
- Peace Bridge (2007)
