= Troubadours of Folk =

Compilation album by various artists
- Released: April 21, 1992
- Recorded: 1960s–1980s
- Genre: Folk; Singer-songwriter
- Length: Five disks
- Label: Rhino Records

Professional ratings
Review scores
Source	Rating
AllMusic	Vol 1
AllMusic	Vol 2
AllMusic	Vol 3
AllMusic	Vol 4
AllMusic	Vol 5

Troubadours of Folk is a five volume series of compact discs released by Rhino Records in 1992. The series documents several decades worth of "contemporary" folk music. The first three volumes focus on the American "folk revival" of the 1960s while the final two volumes focus on singer-songwriter music of the 1970s and 1980s. Because of "licensing restrictions" no songs by Bob Dylan could be included in the anthology. The series tends to focus on American folk music although not exclusively. Rhino later released a series of volumes titled Troubadours of British Folk.

== Troubadours of the Folk Era Vol. 1 ==
=== Track listing ===
1. "This Land Is Your Land" – Woody Guthrie – 2:32
2. "Silver Dagger" – Joan Baez – 2:32
3. "Tomorrow is a Long Time" – Ian & Sylvia – 3:20
4. "Violets of Dawn" – Eric Andersen – 3:50
5. "John Henry" – Odetta – 3:11
6. "Reno, Nevada" – Richard & Mimi Fariña – 3:10
7. "Four in the Morning" – Jesse Colin Young – 3:26
8. "Wasn't That a Mighty Storm" – Eric Von Schmidt – 4:42
9. "The Universal Soldier" – Buffy Sainte-Marie – 2:18
10. "Cocaine Blues" – Dave Van Ronk – 4:20
11. "Morning Dew" – Bonnie Dobson – 4:30
12. "San Francisco Bay Blues" – Ramblin' Jack Elliott – 1:59
13. "I'll Fly Away" – Carolyn Hester – 2:52
14. "Well, Well, Well" – Bob Gibson, Bob Camp and Dick Rosmini – 3:38
15. "Mean Old Frisco" – John Hammond – 3:20
16. "The First Time Ever I Saw Your Face" – Ewan MacColl and Peggy Seeger – 2:38
17. "Mr. Spaceman" – Holy Modal Rounders – 1:55
18. "Catch the Wind" – Donovan – 2:54

== Troubadours of the Folk Era Vol. 2 ==
=== Track listing ===
1. "Turn! Turn! Turn! (To Everything There Is a Season)" – Pete Seeger – 3:10
2. "Get Together" – Hamilton Camp – 3:59
3. "The Circle Game" – Tom Rush – 5:12
4. "Both Sides Now" – Joni Mitchell 4:30
5. "Other Side of This Life" – Fred Neil – 2:54
6. "High Flying Bird" – Judy Henske – 2:55
7. "Tear Down the Walls" – Martin & Neil – 2:34
8. "Who Knows Where the Time Goes?" – Judy Collins – 4:20
9. "Ramblin' Boy" – Tom Paxton – 3:59
10. "Winken, Blinken and Nod" – Simon Sisters – 2:06
11. "Reason to Believe" – Tim Hardin – 1:59
12. "There But for Fortune" – Phil Ochs – 2:35
13. "Changes" – Jim and Jean – 3:46
14. "Follow" – Richie Havens – 6:20
15. "Take a Giant Step" – Taj Mahal – 4:15
16. "500 Miles" – Hedy West – 2:53
17. "Don't You Leave Me Here" – Jim Kweskin & The Jug Band – 2:34
18. "Once I Was" – Tim Buckley – 3:22

== Troubadours of the Folk Era Vol. 3: The Groups ==
=== Track listing ===
1. "Goodnight Irene" – The Weavers – 3:48
2. "Tom Dooley" – Kingston Trio – 3:05
3. "Hard, Ain't It Hard" – Limeliters – 2:47
4. "The Bells" – Modern Folk Quartet – 3:54
5. "Walk Right In" – The Rooftop Singers – 2:36
6. "Gotta Travel On" – Au Go Go Singers – 2:31
7. "Skewball" – Greenbriar Boys – 2:34
8. "Roll in My Sweet Baby's Arms" – New Lost City Ramblers – 2:58
9. "Michael" – The Highwaymen 2:46
10. "Take Your Fingers Off It" – Even Dozen Jug Band – 2:26
11. "Greenfields" – The Brothers Four – 3:05
12. "Silver Threads and Golden Needles" – The Springfields – 2:15
13. "The Banana Boat Song (Day-O)" – Tarriers – 3:01
14. Green, Green – The New Christy Minstrels – 2:11
15. "River Come Down" – The Journeymen – 2:48
16. "Linin' Track" – "Spider" John Koerner and Dave "Snaker" Ray – 2:20
17. "Rider" – The Big Three – 2:35
18. "Mobile Line" – Jim Kweskin & The Jug Band – 3:27

== Troubadours Of Folk Vol. 4: Singer-Songwriters Of The '70s ==
The fourth volume covers what is described as the "heyday" of the singer-songwriter movement.

=== Track listing ===
In most cases the performer is also the songwriter.

1. "Country Road" – James Taylor – 3:24
2. "City of New Orleans" – Steve Goodman – 3:53
3. "Diamonds & Rust" – Joan Baez – 4:44
4. "Yankee Lady" – Jesse Winchester – 4:03
5. "Heart Like a Wheel" – Kate & Anna McGarrigle (written by Kate McGarrigle) – 3:12
6. "Mr. Bojangles" – Nitty Gritty Dirt Band (written by Jerry Jeff Walker) – 3:38
7. "Old Friend" – Loudon Wainwright III – 2:59
8. "Lady-O" – Judee Sill – 3:15
9. "Vincent" – Don McLean – 4:06
10. "From Me to You" – Janis Ian – 3:22
11. "Taxi" – Harry Chapin – 6:45
12. "Angel from Montgomery" – John Prine – 3:47
13. "Rock, Salt and Nails" – Rosalie Sorrels – 4:19
14. "Hobo's Lullaby" – Arlo Guthrie – 3:59
15. "Poetry Man" – Phoebe Snow – 4:38
16. "She's a Lady" – John Sebastian – 1:47
17. "The Lilac and the Apple" – Kate Wolf – 2:42
18. "Pancho and Lefty" – Townes Van Zandt – 3:42

== Troubadours Of Folk Vol. 5: Singer-Songwriters Of The '80s ==
The final volume of the collection documents another revival-of-sorts that took place in the 1980s by singer-songwriters influenced as much by 1970s punk rock as 1960s folk. As the liner notes by Barry Alfonso explain:

Of course, folk as a genre had never gone away, just slipped out of the limelight. The rediscovery of the acoustic tradition by punks and other upstarts was newsworthy to rock critics and other arbiters of hipness. But trendy or not, the folk music community had never ceased to exist, and some of its members were dubious about the recent converts asking for admission. These questions about commitment to traditions were part of the same folk sectarian debate that put Bob Dylan in the doghouse after he went electric back in '65.

To avoid arguments over the definition of "folk" the collections attempts to cover "as many segments of '80s folkdom as possible, including those that contested each other's legitimacy."

=== Track listing ===
Songs written by the performer unless otherwise indicated.

1. "What Kinda Guy?" – Steve Forbert
2. "Mary Hooley" – Phranc
3. "Daylight" (written by Tom Goodkind) – The Washington Squares
4. "Marlene on The Wall" – Suzanne Vega
5. "Walk in the Woods" – Peter Case
6. "On the Road to Fairfax County" (written by David Massengill) – The Roches
7. "Behind the Cathedral" – Willie Nile
8. "Help Save the Youth of America" – Billy Bragg
9. "The Healing Hymn" – The Shakers
10. "Pearly Blues" – Roger Manning
11. "Boogieman" – Victoria Williams
12. "Down in the Milltown" – John Gorka
13. "Stranded" – Shawn Colvin
14. "Bastard Son" – John Wesley Harding
15. "Love at the Five and Dime" – Nanci Griffith
16. "Shipwrecked at the Stable Door" – Bruce Cockburn
17. "Rags of Flowers" (written by John Lombardo/Mary Ramsey) – John & Mary
18. "Passionate Kisses" – Lucinda Williams
