= Like I Said: Songs 1990–91 =

Compilation album by Ani Difranco
- Released: October 1, 1993
- Recorded: 1990–1991
- Genre: Indie rock
- Length: 48:28
- Label: Righteous Babe
- Producer: Ani DiFranco, Ed Stone

Ani Difranco chronology
Puddle Dive (1993)	Like I Said: Songs 1990–91 (1993)	Out of Range (1994)

Professional ratings
Review scores
Source	Rating
Allmusic	3/5 stars
Robert Christgau	(2-star Honorable Mention)
The Rolling Stone Album Guide	3.5/5 stars
Slant	4/5 stars

Like I Said: Songs 1990–91 is a 1993 album by Ani DiFranco, offering reinterpretations of songs from her first two albums, the eponymous Ani DiFranco (1990) and Not So Soft (1991).

== Track listing ==
All songs by Ani DiFranco.

1. "Anticipate" – 2:42^{‡}
2. "Rockabye" – 4:01^{‡}
3. "Not So Soft" – 3:01^{‡}
4. "Roll With It" – 3:22^{‡}
5. "Work Your Way Out" – 3:40^{†}
6. "Fire Door" – 2:57^{†}
7. "Gratitude" – 2:44^{‡}
8. "The Whole Night" – 2:20^{‡}
9. "Both Hands" – 3:01^{†}
10. "She Says" – 3:39^{‡}
11. "Rush Hour" – 4:50^{†}
12. "Out of Habit" – 2:32^{†}
13. "Lost Woman Song" – 4:00^{†}
14. "Talk to Me Now" – 3:57^{†}
15. "The Slant" – 1:45^{†}

Notes
† Appears on Ani DiFranco
‡ Appears on Not So Soft
