= Twice Told Tales (album) =

Studio album by 10,000 Maniacs
- Released: April 4, 2015
- Recorded: Tarbox Studios, Cassadaga, NY and the Funhouse, Silver Creek, NY
- Genre: Folk
- Label: Cleopatra Records
- Producer: Armand John Petri

10,000 Maniacs chronology
| Music from the Motion Picture (2013) | Twice Told Tales (2015) | Playing Favorites (2016) |

Twice Told Tales is the ninth studio album by Jamestown, New York band 10,000 Maniacs. It is an album that consists of many traditional folk songs from the British Isles. For this album, they teamed up with producer Armand John Petri, who had worked with the band since 1991, as well as producing their 1999 album The Earth Pressed Flat. Coming back into the fold was founding member John Lombardo, who had supplied the band with a cassette full of songs he loved, as well as putting together the arrangements. The band funded the project through the online direct-to-fan music platform PledgeMusic. The funding drive ran from May 2014 to March 2015. Early promotion of the project included a concert held at the Reg Lenna Center For The Arts in Jamestown, which was also streamed online. The album was released through Cleopatra Records on April 10, 2015.

== Reception ==
Professional ratings
Aggregate scores
| Source | Rating |
|---|---|
| Metacritic | 57/100 |
Review scores
| Source | Rating |
| AllMusic | 3/5 stars |

According to the review aggregator Metacritic, Twice Told Tales received "mixed or average reviews" based on a weighted average score of 57 out of 100 from four critic scores.

== Track listing ==
All songs traditional except "The Song of Wandering Aengus": words by William Butler Yeats, set to music by Travis Edmonson.

1. "Lady Mary Ramsey I"
2. "The Song of Wandering Aengus"
3. "She Moved Through the Fair"
4. "Dark Eyed Sailor"
5. "Misty Moisty Morning"
6. "Bonny May"
7. "Canadee-I-O"
8. "Do You Love an Apple?"
9. "Greenwood Sidey"
10. "Carrickfergus"
11. "Death of Queen Jane"
12. "Wild Mountain Thyme"
13. "Marie's Wedding"
14. "Lady Mary Ramsay II"

== Personnel ==
10,000 Maniacs

- Jerome Augustyniak – drums, percussion
- Dennis Drew – keyboards
- Jeff Erickson – guitar & vocal
- Steve Gustafson – bass guitar
- Mary Ramsey – vocals, violin, viola

Additional musicians

- John Lombardo – guitar
- Susan Ramsey – violin
- Bryan Eckenrode – cello
- Armand John Petri – mellotron
- Joe Rozler – string trio arrangement on "Death of Queen Jane"
- Danny Hicks/Timothy Patrick Quill – handclaps on "Canadee-I-O"

Additional album credits

- Produced and engineered by Armand John Petri
- Mastering Engineer Bernd Gottinger
- Design by Don Keller
- Cover collage by John Lombardo
- Creative Direction: John Lombardo
- Executive Producers: Donald Semmens, Adam Zeitz, Julie Gochenour, Flavio Louzada, Henry Houh, Andreas Laemmermann, Catherine Fredericks, Damon Torres, Therese Fisher, Tom Galloway, Brian Matthias, Murry Galloway, Nicholas Randall, James Lawrence, Richard C. Castagana Jr., Martin Ziesch, Alexander Glintschert, Mike Bleecher, Jeff Crabill, Mick Mueller, Frits Demortier, Stephen Monroe, Rick Strezo, Gehrig Peterson, Harvey Kivel, Alan Cohen, James Serio, Alistair McLean, Laurie Gengo, Wesley Costas
