= Victory Gardens =

Studio album by John & Mary
- Released: 1991
- Recorded: June 18 – July 22, 1990
- Genre: Folk rock
- Length: 38:40
- Label: Rykodisc
- Producer: John Lombardo

John & Mary chronology
Victory Gardens (1991)	The Weedkiller's Daughter (1993)

Victory Gardens is the debut album by the American musical duo John & Mary, released in 1991 by Rykodisc. John Lombardo, former member of 10,000 Maniacs and responsible for much of their early music, brought elements of the early Maniacs sound; Mary Ramsey added a blend of folk and classical influences.

Victory Gardens was produced by Lombardo and recorded at Mitch Easter's Chapel Hill Drive-In Studio in Winston-Salem, NC. The album features 10,000 Maniacs members Robert Buck and Jerome Augustyniak as well as special guests Ronnie Lane (Small Faces), Joey Molland (Badfinger) and Augie Meyers (Sir Douglas Quintet, Texas Tornados).

The song "Red Wooden Beads" was included on Steal This Disc Vol. 3, part of a series of compact discs released by Rykodisc in 1991. "Rags of Flowers" was included on Troubadours of Folk Vol. 5: Singer-Songwriters of the '80s, part of a five volume series of compact discs released by Rhino Records in 1992.

== Critical reception ==
Professional ratings
Review scores
Source	Rating
AllMusic	4.5/5 stars

Trouser Press called the album "a seductive, low-key delight". The Vancouver Sun opined that "Ramsey's voice is a little thin to be carrying the weight that these songs demand."

== Track listing ==
All tracks composed by John Lombardo and Mary Ramsey except where indicated

1. "Red Wooden Beads" – 2:53
2. "The Azalea Festival" – 4:28
3. "Piles of Dead Leaves" – 4:14
4. "We Have Nothing" (John Lombardo) – 3:47
5. "Rags of Flowers" – 3:20
6. "I Became Alone" – 3:33
7. "The Open Window" – 3:45
8. "July 6th" (John Lombardo) – 4:39
9. "Pram" (John Lombardo) – 3:21
10. "Un Canadien Errant" (Public Domain, arranged by Mary Ramsey) – 4:40

== Personnel ==
John & Mary

- John Lombardo – 6 and 12 string guitar, bass, vocal, producer
- Mary Ramsey – vocal, viola, violin, piano, organ

Additional musicians

- Robert Buck – lead guitar, mandolin
- Jerome Augustyniak – drums, vocal (background - "We Have Nothing")
- Armand John Petri – percussion ("Un Canadien Errant"), engineer, mixing
- Ronnie Lane – vocal ("We Have Nothing")
- Joey Molland – vocal, guitar, guitar solo ("I Became Alone")
- Augie Meyers – accordion ("Un Canadien Errant")

Technical staff

- Stuart Sullivan – engineer
- Joe Barbaria – mixing
- Mitch Easter – engineer
- Toby Mountain – mastering
- Shannon Carr – mixing
- Dan Griffin – production

== Singles ==
In 1991 Rykodisc released a 7-inch vinyl promotional-only single

1. "Red Wooden Beads" – 2:53
2. "The Azalea Festival" (live version) – 3:10
