= Puddle Dive =

Studio album by Ani DiFranco
- Released: February 14, 1993
- Genre: Indie rock, folk
- Length: 35:26
- Label: Righteous Babe
- Producer: Dale Anderson; Ani DiFranco; Ed Stone

Ani DiFranco chronology
Imperfectly (1992)	Puddle Dive (1993)	Like I Said: Songs 1990-91 (1994)

Professional ratings
Review scores
Source	Rating
AllMusic	3/5 stars
Robert Christgau	(2-star Honorable Mention)
The Rolling Stone Album Guide	4/5 stars
Slant	3.5/5 stars

Puddle Dive is the fourth studio album by American singer-songwriter Ani DiFranco, released in 1993.

== Track listing ==
All tracks are written by Ani DiFranco.

No.	Title	Length
1.	"Names and Dates and Times"	2:39
2.	"Anyday"	3:00
3.	"July 4"	3:03
4.	"Willing to Fight"	3:49
5.	"Egos Like Hairdos"	2:44
6.	"Back Around"	3:09
7.	"Blood in the Boardroom"	3:55
8.	"Born a Lion"	1:48
9.	"My I.Q."	2:23
10.	"Used to You"	3:23
11.	"Pick Yer Nose"	2:44
12.	"God's Country"	2:48
Total length:		35:25

== Personnel ==
- Ani DiFranco – acoustic guitar, steel guitar, vocals
- Scot Fisher – accordion
- Scott Freilich – bass
- Rory McLeod – harmonica
- Alex Meyer – whistle, cuíca
- Ann Rabson – piano
- Mary Ramsey – violin
- Andy Stochansky – percussion, drums, marimba, triangle, steel drums, djembe, shaker, backing vocals

=== Production ===
- Ani DiFranco – record producer
- Dale Anderson – producer
- Ed Stone – engineer, producer
