= Magna-Fi =

American rock band

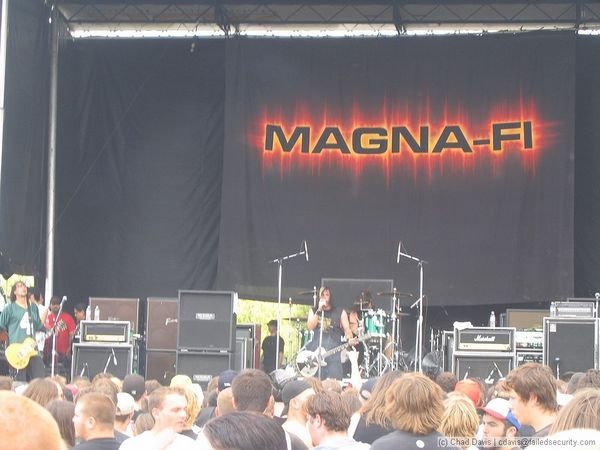
- Magna-Fi live on stage (August 14th 2004)

Background information
- Also known as: Outta The Blue, The Szuters
- Origin: Las Vegas, Nevada, U.S.
- Genres: Alternative metal; hard rock; post-grunge
- Years active: 2001–2010
- Labels: Aezra, Gold Circle Records, Victor
- Past members: Mike Szuter; Chris Brady; Rob Kley; Charlie Smaldino; C.J. Szuter

Magna-Fi, also known as The Szuters or Outta The Blue, was an alternative rock band from Las Vegas, Nevada. It consisted of guitarist and lead vocalist Mike Szuter alongside his brother C.J. Szuter on guitar, bassist Rob Kley, drummer Charlie Smaldino, and, in their later years, guitarist Christian Brady. They are perhaps best known for performing "All Hail Shadow" on the Shadow the Hedgehog (2005) video game soundtrack, as well as their single "Where Did We Go Wrong", which was used for the NASCAR 2005: Chase for the Cup.

== History ==
Mike and C.J. had found moderate success touring and releasing albums in Japan while under the name The Szuters. However, their music seldom left the country, and their original bassist and drummer left after their third album in early 2000. The brothers, originally hailing from Cleveland, relocated to Las Vegas in 1997. Here, they would find bassist Rob Kley & drummer Charlie Smaldino. While they would continue to perform as The Szuters in the Asia, the group had decided on their new title for western audiences by 2002, citing confusion of their genre and pronunciation of the name "Szuters". The band was signed to Gold Circle Records, and their first album was due to be released under this label. However, just one day after the single release of Where Did We Go Wrong, Gold Circle's record label dropped out, cancelling the album's release. After releasing the album independently through shows, the four-piece would get signed to Aezra Records, a label distributed by EMI, in 2003. Magna-Fi's debut album on the label, Burn Out The Stars, was produced by Paul Lani (Megadeth, Failure, Mötley Crüe).

In 2004, Magna-Fi appeared on the weekly concert series in Buffalo, New York, on Thursday at the Square along with Fuel and Seven Day Faith. The band at that time, for 2 months, was direct support for Fuel. In the same year, they appeared at the annual festival tour, Ozzfest. Afterwards, the band headlined their tour and became direct support for Sevendust for months after. They also made a return home for veterans show in North Carolina, after a sudden Sevendust cancellation.

At the end of a tour in 2006, they were in talks with Aezra about recording a new album, but these discussions ultimately ended with the quartet and the label parting ways, and the band decided to record their next release on their own. After an argument with Charlie Smaldino and the ultimatum posed by Mike, CJ Szuter left the band mere weeks before the release of the second album. This was followed by the entrance of guitarist and vocalist Chris Brady, another Las Vegas native and long-time friend of the band. The new album, VerseChorusKillMe, was recorded and mixed by the band itself, and released in December of the same year.

In 2010, drummer Charlie Smaldino, having not played with the other members for over a year, experiencing multiple rejections from record labels, and losing interest in the band, decided to hold a final show at Count's Vamp’d in Las Vegas. Following this performance, the group officially disbanded.

In 2020, Mike Szuter revived The Szuters moniker for a solo project and released the album Sugar, then released The Devil's In The Details the following year.

In 2025, the original lineup of The Szuters (not to be confused with the original line-up of Magna-Fi) held a reunion performance at a private event, playing many of their songs including songs from Burn Out The Stars. This performance is currently being mixed and will release as a live album at a later time.

== Band members ==
=== Final lineup ===
- Mike Szuter – guitar, vocals (2001–2010)
- Charlie Smaldino – drums (2001–2010)
- Rob Kley – bass, vocals (2001–2010)
- Chris Brady – guitar, vocals (2006–2010)

=== Past members ===
- C.J. Szuter – guitar (2001–2006)

== Discography ==
Magna-Fi released two albums, 4 singles, as well as individual tracks for video games.

=== Burn Out The Stars ===
Burn Out the Stars

Studio album by Magna-Fi
- Released: 2003 (Self-released) June 15th, 2004 (Aezra Records)
- Genres: Alternative metal, hard rock, post grunge
- Labels: Gold Circle; Self-released; Aezra

Singles from Burn Out The Stars
- 1. "Where Did We Go Wrong"; 2. "Down In It"

Burn Out The Stars is Magna-Fi's debut album, and the only one featuring guitarist C.J. Szuter.

==== Track listing ====
Gold Circle Records promotional release (2002) and independent release (2003)
No.	Title	Length
1.	"When I Leave You"	2:44
2.	"Where Did We Go Wrong"	3:02
3.	"Down In It"	4:11
4.	"Drown"	3:50
5.	"This Life"	4:15
6.	"TV Killed Me"	3:54
7.	"Beautiful"	4:06
8.	"Seconds, Minutes, Hours"	4:25
9.	"My Heaven"	4:25
10.	"Ex OK" (only appears on the independent and Gold Circle Records promotional releases)	3:25
11.	"Bradbury Heights"	4:13

Aezra Records release (2004)
No.	Title	Length
1.	"Where Did We Go Wrong"	3:02
2.	"When I Leave You"	2:44
3.	"Down In It"	4:11
4.	"Drown"	3:50
5.	"This Life"	4:15
6.	"TV Killed Me"	3:54
7.	"Beautiful"	4:06
8.	"Seconds, Minutes, Hours"	4:25
9.	"My Heaven"	4:25
10.	"Bradbury Heights"	4:13

=== VerseChorusKillMe ===
VerseChorusKillMe

Studio album by Magna-Fi
- Released: December 17, 2006
- Genres: Alternative metal, alternative rock, hard rock, post grunge
- Length: 39:10
- Label: Self-released

VerseChorusKillMe is the second and final album by Magna-Fi.

"Who I Am" was originally written and recorded for the Shadow the Hedgehog (2005) soundtrack, but was replaced with another song, All Hail Shadow. The band later re-recorded and re-used the song, albeit with altered leads due to C.J.'s departure.

Track listing
No.	Title	Length
1.	"Who I Am"	3:26
2.	"Kiss It Away"	3:07
3.	"Fall From Grace"	3:40
4.	"Breaking Up"	3:59
5.	"When I'm Awake"	2:56
6.	"Fan The Flames"	3:52
7.	"Miserable Failure" (titled "You Miserable Failure" on CD release)	3:16
8.	"Someday"	3:11
9.	"Dream Denied Destroyed"	5:08
10.	"Save Me"	4:17
11.	"Well Well"	2:18

== Other songs ==
=== Singles ===
- Where Did We Go Wrong (2002, Gold Circle Records, promo)
- Where Did We Go Wrong (2004, Aezra Records, promo)
- Down In It (2004, Aezra Records, promo)
- This Life (2005-03-07, Aezra Records, promo)

=== Unreleased songs ===
Magna-Fi recorded many songs that were never formally released, but have surfaced online in the years following their disbandment.

- All The Right Words
- American Airtime
- Burn Out The Stars
- The Curve
- Don't Mean Nothing To Me
- Ecstatic
- Going Out
- Hard To Find
- Hearts And Minds
- Heaven and Flies
- Inside The Silence
- Kick It Out
- Me The Enemy
- Misshapen
- Obvious
- Pay To Play
- P.F.I.
- Saved The Best For Last
- Squint
- Stop Me
- Wayne (The Handgun Song)

=== In Video Games ===
- 2005: "All Hail Shadow" – released on Lost & Found: Shadow the Hedgehog Vocal Trax; a credits theme song for Shadow the Hedgehog. Another song titled "Who I Am" was originally written for the game when SEGA Composer Jun Senoue contacted Mike Szuter about writing a song for the game. Senoue later said that he wanted to write a song together with Mike, thus resulting in "All Hail Shadow". The song later appeared on the 2007 album VerseChorusKillMe, but had new leads recorded to replace the original because C.J. Szuter left the band and was replaced by Chris Brady.
- 2004: NASCAR SimRacing and NASCAR 2005: Chase for the Cup included "Where Did We Go Wrong" as one of the selectable tracks. It is also in the 2005 release of the EA Sports NASCAR Racing arcade game.
- 2006: "All Hail Shadow" was covered by Crush 40 for the game Sonic the Hedgehog (also known as Sonic '06 or Sonic 2006). This version of the song has been remixed and reused in other games in the franchise, such as Sonic Forces or Shadow Generations.
