= Peace Bridge (album) =

Studio album by John & Mary
- Released: July 27, 2007
- Genre: Folk rock Modern rock
- Producer: John Lombardo

John & Mary chronology
The Pinwheel Galaxy (2003)	Peace Bridge (2007)

Peace Bridge (2007) is the fourth album from John & Mary, their first with the Valkyries.

== Track listing ==
All tracks composed by John Lombardo and Mary Ramsey except where indicated

1. "Poppy" – 3:45
2. "Easter" – 3:42
3. "Shudder Girl" – 4:05
4. "The Gift of Life" – 3:55
5. "Goodbye Stan" (Lombardo) – 2:32
6. "Triumph" – 3:31
7. "23 Days" – 4:15
8. "Johnny and Mary" (Robert Palmer) – 3:37
9. "Autumn in Rio" – 3:54
10. "This Time Alone" (Lombardo) – 4:49
11. "That's Where I Went Wrong" (Terry Jacks) – 2:39
12. "Billy and Shelley" – 3:49
13. "Time Hard" (G. Agard) – 2:35

== Personnel ==
John & Mary & the Valkyries

- John Lombardo – acoustic guitar, vocal, producer, mixing, graphic design
- Mary Ramsey – vocal, viola, violin, mixing
- Patrick J. Kane – electric lead and rhythm guitar, mixing
- Kent Weber – bass guitar (2–12)
- Rob Lynch – drums (2, 3, 5–9, 11, 12)
- Joe Rozler – keyboards (1–13), vocal (10, 13), string arrangement (12)
- Nelson Starr – keyboards (6, 9, 10), bass guitar (1, 13), vocal (13)
- Jerome Agustyniak – drums (1, 4)

Additional musicians

- Victor DeLorenzo – varied percussion (9)
- Davey Moore – pennywhistle (3)
- Charlie Quill – banjo (5)
- Jimmy Burgess – trombone (10, 13)
- Loraine O'Donnell – vocal (7, 11)
- Kenny Petersen – pedal steel guitar (7, 11)
- Andrew Case – drums (13)
- Gretchen Schulz – vocal (3)
- John Allen – flute (9)
- Greg Gizzi – drums (10)
- Armand John Petri – tambourine (9)
- David Schulz – organ (4)
- Jonathan Golove – cello (12)

Technical staff

- Dwane Hall – engineer, mixing
- Rob Price – production
