= The Weedkiller's Daughter =

Studio album by John & Mary
- Released: March 2, 1993
- Genre: Folk rock Modern rock
- Length: 42:08
- Label: Rykodisc
- Producer: John Lombardo and Armand John Petri

John & Mary chronology
Victory Gardens (1991)	The Weedkiller's Daughter (1993)	The Pinwheel Galaxy (2002)

Professional ratings
Review scores
Source	Rating
AllMusic	3/5 stars
Rolling Stone	link

The Weedkiller's Daughter (1993) is the second album from John & Mary.

The Weedkiller's Daughter was produced by John Lombardo and Armand John Petrie and, like their first album Victory Gardens, features 10,000 Maniacs members Rob Buck and Jerry Augustyniak. Other contributors include Alex Chilton (Box Tops, Big Star), Canadian singer-songwriter Mary Margaret O'Hara, Bob Wiseman (Blue Rodeo), and English folk-guitar legend Martin Simpson.

The tracks "Angels of Stone" and "Cemetery Ridge" were songs that John Lombardo wrote during the last year he was part of 10,000 Maniacs. Cemetery Ridge was formerly known as "Thompson's March."

== Track listing ==
All tracks composed by John Lombardo and Mary Ramsey except where indicated.

1. "Two Worlds Parted" – 3:04
2. "Angels of Stone" – 4:38
3. "Your Return" – 3:09
4. "Clare's Scarf" – 3:44
5. "Cemetery Ridge" – 3:09
6. "A Nightfall" – 3:44
7. "I Wanted You" (Hudson, Ford) – 2:30
8. "One Step Backward" – 3:49
9. "Fly Me to the North" (Marian Segal) – 4:24
10. "Clouds of Reason" – 4:24
11. "Maid of the Mist" (Mary Ramsey) – 1:50
12. "The Poor Murdered Woman" (Traditional) – 3:43

== Personnel ==
John & Mary

- John Lombardo – 12-string and bass guitar, vocal, producer
- Mary Ramsey – vocal, viola, violin, Hammond organ

Additional musicians

- Robert Buck – electric lead guitar
- Stan Barton – mandolin
- Andrew Case – drums
- Joanne Ramsey – background vocal
- Jerome Augustyniak – drums
- Scott Miller – electric guitar solo
- Bob Wiseman – accordion, piano, Hammond organ
- Mary Margaret O'Hara – background vocal
- Alex Chilton – electric lead guitar, vocal
- Martin Simpson – acoustic lead guitar
- Joe Rozler – Hammond organ, piano
- David Kane – piano, Hammond organ
- Bryan Eckenrode – (with Natalie Soil cello trio)
- Alfred B. Frenning – (with Natalie Soil cello trio, string arrangement)
- Robbie Hausmann – (with Natalie Soil cello trio)

Technical staff

- Armand John Petri – producer, engineer, mixing
- Toby Mountain – mastering
