= Nik and the Nice Guys =

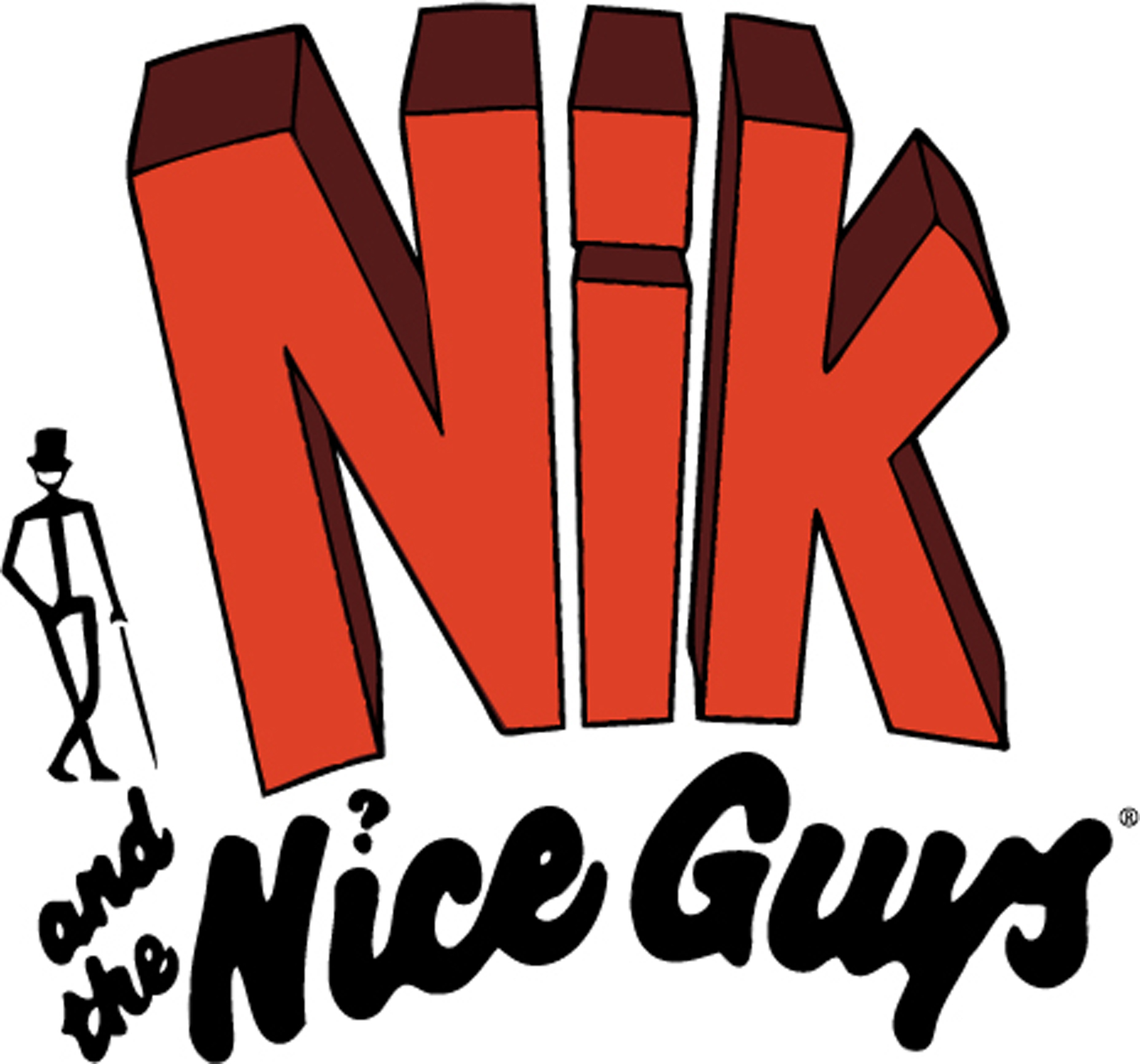
Nik and the Nice Guys band stickman trademark

Nik and the Nice Guys is a rock and roll party band formed in 1971 at St. Lawrence University. One of the founding members, Mike Keenan, went on to be a professional hockey coach. The group disbanded upon graduation but reformed in the 1980s in Rochester, NY while Keenan was coaching the Rochester Americans (AHL team.) (Keenan later went on to coach the Chicago Blackhawks and St. Louis Blues.) Other members of the band have included NHL coach Jacques Martin and former New York Giants and Jets punter Dave Jennings.

== History ==
The original Nik was a classmate of the original band members (and college hockey player) at St. Lawrence University. "Nik was a real ladies man and was known as Nickie Nice Guy." explained publicist Mike Perry. "The band just started calling itself after him."

== Notable appearances ==
- Starting with Super Bowl XX in New Orleans, Nik and the Nice Guys performed for the NFL and their corporate customers for nearly two decades.
- Nik and the Nice Guys were the house band for the Bob Uecker Sports Show and The Lighter Side of Sports from 1989-1990
- On Saturday, June 15, 1991, Nik and the Nice Guys provided entertainment for the Wayne Gretzky Celebrity Sports Classic Softball Tournament in Brantford, Ontario, Canada (proceeds went to Canadian Association for Blindness.) Gretzky was the host, and sports stars who participated included Buffalo Bills quarterback Jim Kelly, Toronto Argos rookie Rocket Ismail, NHL Hall of Famer Gordie Howe, St. Louis Blues right wing and 1991 NHL MVP Brett Hull, Detroit Lions kicker Eddie Murray, and world class figure skater Kurt Browning. Hollywood stars who participated included Peter Weller, Alan Thicke, John Candy, James Woods, Terri Garr, Connie Selleca, and Catherine Mary Stewart.
- Nik and the Nice Guys had 12 performances for Olympic corporate clients in Barcelona, 1992. In attendance were Prince Albert of Monaco, Connie Sellecca, George Foreman, and Sports Illustrated model Kathy Ireland who played air guitar on stage with the band.
- On Saturday, February 20, 1993, Nik and the Nice Guys performed after the Amerks Alumni Celebrity All-Star Hockey Challenge in Rochester, NY. Clarence Clemons joined the band on stage, playing sax on his hit song You're A Friend Of Mine and Bruce Springsteen's Sherry Darling. Celebrities in attendance and on stage included Jason Hervey, Kelsey Grammer, Lochlyn Munro, Jerry Houser, and Matthew Perry.
- The band performed at Buffalo, NY's "Thursday at the Square" in 1994
- On Saturday, December 4, 1999, Nik and the Nice Guys performed at the David E. Kelley Productions double-Emmy party in Hollywood, CA, celebrating the wins for Best Comedy (Ally McBeal) and Best Drama (The Practice.)
- Nik and the Nice Guys performed for the NHL All-Star Game weekend in Raleigh, NC in January 2011.
