= Tommy Z =

American singer

- Born: Tommy Zabielski; Hamburg, New York, United States
- Genres: Electric blues
- Occupations: Guitarist, singer, songwriter, record producer, audio engineer, guitar teacher, radio dj
- Instruments: Guitar, vocals, bass, percussion
- Years active: 1990s–present
- Label: Various
- Website: tommyzband.com

Tommy Z is an American electric blues guitarist, singer, songwriter, record producer, and audio engineer, who has released four studio albums and one live album to date. He has been described as a "blues treasure" by Jim Santella (WBFO), and as "one of WNY's best kept secrets" by Sarah French of Blues Matters! magazine. In 2007, he was inducted into the Buffalo Music Hall of Fame.

His 2016 album, Blizzard of Blues, debuted at number 8 in the Billboard Top Blues Albums Chart. It was followed by Plug in and Play in 2021, which debuted at number 5 on the US Billboard Top Blues Album Chart.

== Life and career ==
Born Tommy Zabielski in Hamburg, New York, United States, the son of a Vietnam-era veteran, he has been honored with a number of awards including the Top Blues Vocalist in Western New York (2003, 2004 and 2006), and Top Blues Guitarist (1993, 1994, 1995, 1997, 2004, 2005, and 2006). His group, known simply as the Tommy Z Band, has won the Top Blues/Crossover Blues Band category (1994, 2005 and 2006). Tommy Z also received the Muddy Waters Award for "Artist of the Year", granted by the Blues Society of WNY in 2004 and then again in 2024 in recognition of his efforts to promote blues music via his radio station WBLZ. In 2007, he was inducted into the Buffalo Music Hall of Fame. He once toured backing longtime Muddy Waters pianist Pinetop Perkins. Tommy Z has also traveled regularly to various war torn areas since 2003, to entertain American troops overseas in Iraq, Afghanistan, Saudi Arabia, Kuwait, United Arab Emirates, Bahrain, Qatar, Japan, South Korea, Djibouti, Italy, Spain, Portugal, Egypt, Turkey, Guam, Alaska and other distant locales on behalf of USO/AFE. He is based in Buffalo, New York.

In 2005, Tommy Z and his band released their debut album, Universal Love, on South Blossom Records. It was produced by Nick Blagona.

In 2006, Tommy Z played rhythm guitar on Ian Gillan's album, Gillan's Inn, on the remake of the Deep Purple B-side "When a Blind Man Cries," which also featured work by Jeff Healey and Jon Lord. In the same year, Tommy Z contributed to Michael Lee Jackson's album In a Heartbeat, which was recorded at the Metalworks Studios in Mississauga, Ontario, Canada. Tommy Z performed at Thursday at the Square in 1999, 2001, 2002, 2004 and 2011.

In April 2010, Tommy Z performed at the Washington Monument for FreedomWorks' Take Back America 2010 campaign to an estimated 50,000 people. In 2013, his second release, Sometimes, gained a higher profile, being played on both FM radio and the internet, and it made the initial voting for recordings submitted under the Best Blues Album category for a Grammy Award. The album included Tommy Z's cover version of Johnny "Guitar" Watson's track, "Gangster of Love". He and his band continue to tour appearing at music festivals both in the United States and elsewhere. He is a Canisius College graduate, an oftimes guitar teacher, and has composed music for film and TV including Ryan and Sean's Not So Excellent Adventure, Last Comic Standing (NBC), Animal Planet's Swamp Wars (main title), and America's Next Top Model. In 2015, Tommy Z was employed as the new blues radio DJ by WBFO. In 2022 he created his own 24/7 blues radio station called WBLZ Blizzard of Blues Radio.

Blizzard of Blues (2016) debuted at number 8 in the Billboard Top Blues Albums Chart, and was the only independent record label release on that week's list. Tommy Z wrote eight of the tracks on the album, which were partly inspired by both his experience of driving in blizzard conditions on Route 219 in New York, and the loss of a friend and business associate. The album was recorded in 2015 at Robby Takac's GCR Audio recording studio, with Tommy Z undertaking full production and some engineering duties.

The Tommy Z Band was chosen as the headliner for the 2019 and 2020 Buffalo Ball Drop, the second biggest New Year's Eve celebration of its kind in the country with crowds estimated at 40,000. Tommy Z travelled to Nashville, Tennessee, in January 2020 to work on Blizzard of Blues's follow up, called Plug in and Play, with the record producer Tom Hambridge. It was released on May 2, 2021.

== Discography ==
=== Albums ===
Year	Title	Record label
1999	Live at the Barn: The Tributes	Ohmega
2005	Universal Love	South Blossom Records
2013	Sometimes	South Blossom Records
2016	Blizzard of Blues	South Blossom Records
2021	Plug in and Play	South Blossom Records

== See also ==
- List of electric blues musicians
