= Jackdaw (band) =

- Origin: Buffalo, New York, United States
- Genres: Celtic punk Hardcore punk Oi! / Streetpunk
- Years active: 2000-2009
- Past members: David A. Moore; Tim (Tym) Byrne; George Tutuska; Tommy Jordan; Joe Davies; Mike Jordan; Geno McManus

Jackdaw was a Celtic rock band from Buffalo, New York from 2000 to 2009. One of the group's members, George Tutuska, was a former drummer for the Goo Goo Dolls.

The band formed in 2000, when Tim Byrne, returning from Europe and Tutuska looking to do something different approached singer/songwriter and Celtic performer Geno McManus about joining him up on his annual "Irish Week" of gigs. After a night of "hanging and drinking" with Tim and George the idea of the band was formed and they started the idea to create a "Brick Throwing" Celtic Rock band, that was "Factory Born" and based on their Irish heritage and industrial South Buffalo area roots. McManus then recruited Tommy Jordan to play bass (Jordan also came up with the band's name based on a passage from the Frank McCourt memoir Angela's Ashes), and thus the core band was formed. The songs "Maggie" and "Raise a Glass" were penned during these first rehearsals.

As the core members rehearsed, wrote and performed more, they decided they needed to search for additional players, in order to balance the "raw style" with the traditional "celtic sound." It was then that principal songwriter Byrne found and recruited multi-instrumentalist David Moore, while Tommy Jordan recruited long-time friend Joe Davies to play violin. In late 2000, McManus left the band.

Mike Jordan, who replaced McManus to provide vocals and guitar, left the band in November 2004. The band remained a five-piece group until their break-up in 2009 after Byrne left. In 2006, a compilation of their first three albums and EPs entitled Brilliant, Sad & Guilty was released. The two-disc album included interviews, live tracks, and studio outtakes.

Jackdaw lovingly refers to its most devout followers as the "Jacks" and "Jackies."

Jackdaw won Buffalo's Best Rock Band (and on one occasion beating fellow nominee the Goo Goo Dolls), presented by the free publication Artvoice, in 2002, 2003, 2004, 2005, 2006, and 2007. The band toured the eastern states extensively and Ireland, opened for Dropkick Murphys at Thursday at the Square. In July 2007, the band opened for Pete Best and his band at Club Infinity in Williamsville, NY.

== Former members ==
- Geno McManus: vocals and guitars
- Tim Byrne (founding member): guitar, mandolin, banjo, piano, vocals
- Joe Davies: fiddle
- Tommy Jordan: bass, backing vocals
- David A. Moore: accordion, highland bagpipes, uilleann pipes, whistles, concertina, buttonbox, hurdy-gurdy, vocals
- George Tutuska (founding member): drums
- Mike Jordan: vocals, lead guitar

== Discography ==
=== Albums ===
Armed And Legged (2000)

- 1) Broken Cans
- 2) Raise a Glass
- 3) Corner Bar
- 4) Maggie
- 5) Black and Tans
- 6) Drunken Piper/Cork Hill
- 7) Paddy
- 8) Out in the Ocean

Jackdaw (2001)

- 1) Introduction
- 2) Molly
- 3) Hit the Floor
- 4) Billy Brown
- 5) Pigtail Man
- 5) Black and Tans
- 6) Hogjaw
- 7) Something About Nothing
- 8) Sore Eyes
- 9) Pieces
- 10) Gutterfly
- 11) Nala
- 12) Sorry Again
- 13) Proofrock
- 14) Mist Covered Mountains/Chi Mi Na Morbheanna / Mise Éire / Labhair An Teanga Ghaeilge
- 15) Bagpipes at Midnight

Triple Crown (2004)

- 1) Denied
- 2) Irish in Me (The Morning Star)
- 3) Scrapbook
- 4) Sally Gooden
- 5) 3 Month Girl (The Triangular Trade)
- 6) Echuhskech
- 7) Falling for You
- 8) Sooner or Later
- 9) Brown Shoes
- 10) Cruel
- 11) The Book (Losing, My Friend)
- 12) The Cover Band

Brilliant, Sad & Guilty (2006)

Blackgrass (2007)

- 1) Don't Tell Me Now
- 2) Everything Seems So Damn Simple
- 3) Parade
- 4) Dance
- 5) Bye Bye Lust
- 6) Annelise
- 7) Shiny Black With Rain
- 8) Shout Out at Me
- 9) Bombshelle
- 10) Jamie
- 11) Galway Girl
- 12) Spaghetti Western
- 13) Supersize
- 14) All My Life

=== EPs ===
Whiskey (2002)

- 1) Where is Claire?
- 2) Devil With One Leg
- 3) So Far

Seven (2002)

- 1) Butcher Boy
- 2) Black Cat Luck
- 3) LV82

=== Singles ===
Cruel/The Book (2004)

- 1) Cruel
- 2) The Book (Losing, My Friend)[Acoustic]

=== Compilations ===
- Paddy Rock Radio Volume 1 - (Something About Nothing)
- Shite'n'Onions Volume 2 - (Hogjaw)
- Bring It Back To Life - (Pigtail Man)
