= Mary Ramsey (musician) =

American singer-songwriter (born 1963)

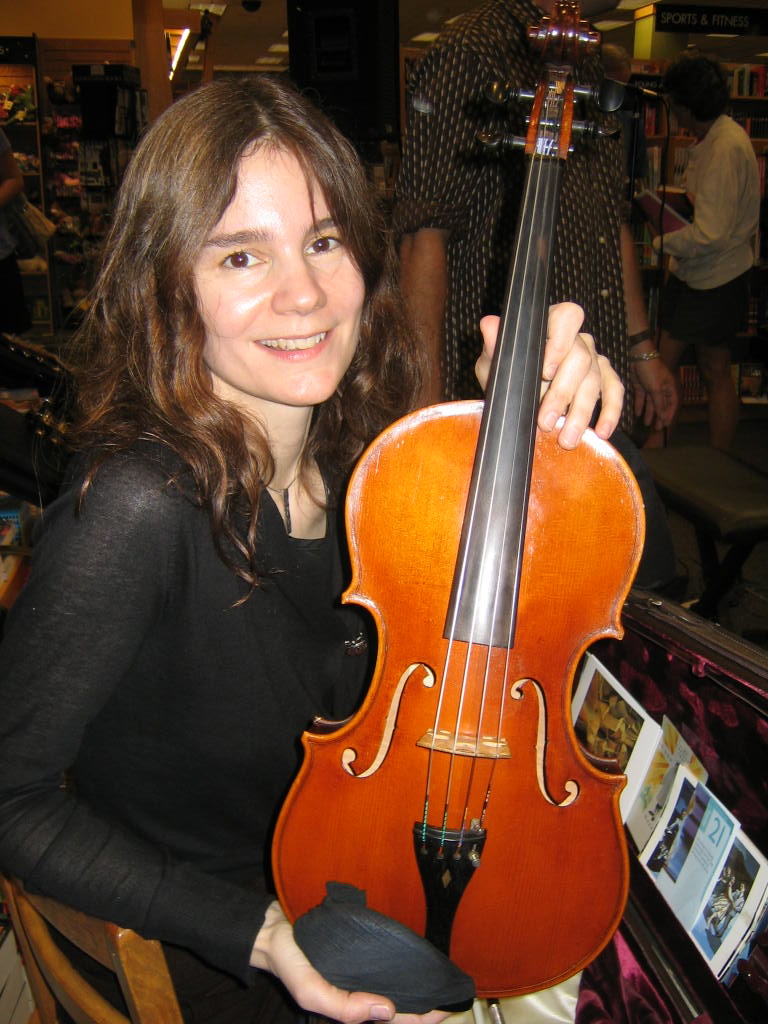
- Mary Ramsey with her viola in 2005.

Background information
- Born: Mary Jeanne Ramsey; December 24, 1963 (age 62); Washington, D.C., U.S.
- Origin: Buffalo, New York, U.S.
- Genres: Folk; folk rock; alternative rock
- Occupations: Musician; singer-songwriter
- Instruments: Vocals; violin; viola; cello
- Years active: 1989–present
- Labels: Rykodisc; Geffen; Bar/None
- Website: Official website

Mary Ramsey (born December 24, 1963) is an American singer. She is a member of folk rock duo John & Mary, and has been the lead singer and violist for the American alternative rock band 10,000 Maniacs since 1995. Ramsey has also worked with other well-known artists such as Jackson Browne, Goo Goo Dolls, Billy Bragg, Warren Zevon, Alex Chilton and Ani DiFranco.

== Biography ==
Ramsey is a classically trained violinist who has been playing the violin since age five. She studied music at the State University of New York at Fredonia and played viola with the Erie Philharmonic for four years. She was a founder of the Lexington String Trio.

With John Lombardo of 10,000 Maniacs, Ramsey formed the folk rock duo John & Mary in 1989. The pair made two recordings under the name John & Mary, Victory Gardens in 1991 and The Weedkiller's Daughter in 1993. Both albums were released on Rykodisc and are out of print. Mary Ramsey also played violin and viola for 10,000 Maniacs and sang backing vocals on the 1993 album MTV Unplugged.

Ramsey returned to the Maniacs as lead singer and songwriter in 1995 after Natalie Merchant's departure, along with Lombardo. The duo released two albums with the Maniacs, 1997's Love Among the Ruins, which contained a cover of the Roxy Music song "More Than This" that became a top 40 hit on the U.S. charts, and The Earth Pressed Flat in 1999. While with 10,000 Maniacs, Ramsey toured throughout the U.S. and in Brazil, Puerto Rico, Panama, England, Portugal, Germany, the Netherlands and Austria. The band also played USO shows in Kuwait and Bahrain. One of the highlights of her career was a performance at the inaugural ball for Bill Clinton's second term as president.

In 2002, after she and Lombardo both left the Maniacs following the death of guitarist Rob Buck, John & Mary released The Pinwheel Galaxy (2003). With their current band the Valkyries, they released Peace Bridge (2007).

Ramsey was rehired by 10,000 Maniacs as a viola player and backing vocalist for the 2006 shows with Oskar Saville and returned to the lead vocalist spot after the departure of Saville in 2007. She continued as lead vocalist for the next 16 years and performed on both the band's 30th anniversary tour (2011–13) and 40th anniversary tour (2021–22), as well as the studio albums Music from the Motion Picture (2013) and Twice Told Tales (2015), which featured Lombardo's return as well, and the live album Playing Favorites (2016). In June 2023, she announced she was leaving 10,000 Maniacs to pursue other projects. She returned to the band in January 2024.

== Other projects ==
Ramsey has performed with a group of friends under the name Mary Ramsey and the Healers. Other members include Sandra Williams Gordon on percussion, Craig Gordon on bass and acoustic guitars, Dr. Marc Rosen on electric guitar, and Ben Clarke on lead guitar and bass. In another project, she was joined by fellow Buffalonians Theresa Quinn, Susan Rozler, and Alison Pipitone in a group called Girls Gone Mild. Ramsey has also worked as a performer and music director for the Irish Classical Theater in Buffalo, New York. She teaches private lessons in piano, violin, viola and voice.

== Awards ==
- 1993 ArtVoice Music Award - viola playing

== Discography ==
=== With John & Mary ===
- Victory Gardens (1991)
- The Weedkiller's Daughter (1993)
- The Pinwheel Galaxy (2002)

=== With John & Mary & the Valkyries ===
- Peace Bridge (2007)

=== With 10,000 Maniacs ===
- Love Among the Ruins (1997)
- The Earth Pressed Flat (1999)
- Triangles (EP) (2011)
- Music from the Motion Picture (2013)
- Twice Told Tales (2015)
- For Crying Out Loud (EP) (2016)
- Playing Favorites (2016)
- Live at the Belly Up (2017)

== Other credits ==
- Don't Try This at Home (1991) – with Billy Bragg (violin, viola)
- Our Time in Eden (1992) – with 10,000 Maniacs (violin, viola)
- Imperfectly (1992) – with Ani Difranco (viola)
- Candy Everybody Wants (EP) (1992) - with 10,000 Maniacs (violin, viola)
- MTV Unplugged (1993) – with 10,000 Maniacs (viola, background vocals)
- Puddle Dive (1993) – with Ani Difranco (violin)
- Superstar Car Wash (1993) – with Goo Goo Dolls
- Between Us (1998) – with Jules Shear (vocals, viola, fiddle)
- Coming of Age (2002) – with Jude Johnstone (viola)
- Songs for the Uninvited (2002) – with Zoomer (electric violin, viola)
- Heads or Tales (2003) - with Jamie Notarthomas (violin)
- Campfire Songs: The Popular, Obscure and Unknown Recordings (2004) - with 10,000 Maniacs (background vocals, violin, viola)
- On a Good Day (2005) – with Jude Johnstone (viola)
- Take My Life (2005) - with Scott Underwood (viola)
- Live Twenty-Five (2006) – with 10,000 Maniacs (electric violin)
- Billy Bragg, Vol. 2 (2006) - with Billy Bragg (violin)
- Innocent Bystanders (2007) – with Innocent Bystanders (strings)
- Extended Versions (2009) – with 10,000 Maniacs (lead vocals, viola)
- Machines of Love and War (2009) - with The Dreaming (violin, viola)
- Me and Miss Grimes (2009) - with Alison Pipitone Band (violin)
- Quiet Girl (2011) – with Jude Johnstone (viola)
- Big Wide World (2013) - with Alison Pipitone Band (violin)
- Where The Lowly Go (2022) - with Ten Cent Howl (violin)
