= Imperfectly =

Studio album by Ani DiFranco
- Released: June 19, 1992
- Recorded: April 1992
- Genre: Indie rock, folk
- Length: 43:53
- Label: Righteous Babe
- Producer: Ani DiFranco, Ed Stone

Ani DiFranco chronology
Not So Soft (1991)	Imperfectly (1992)	Puddle Dive (1993)

Professional ratings
Review scores
Source	Rating
Allmusic	4/5 stars
Robert Christgau	A−
The Rolling Stone Album Guide	4/5 stars
Slant	4/5 stars

Imperfectly is the third studio album by singer-songwriter Ani DiFranco, released in 1992 (see 1992 in music).

== Track listing ==
All tracks are written by Ani DiFranco

No.	Title	Length
1.	"What If No One's Watching"	3:13
2.	"Fixing Her Hair"	4:45
3.	"In or Out"	3:06
4.	"Every State Line"	3:07
5.	"Circle of Light"	2:31
6.	"If It Isn't Her"	3:57
7.	"Good, Bad, Ugly"	3:01
8.	"I'm No Heroine"	3:20
9.	"Coming Up"	1:47
10.	"Make Them Apologize"	4:19
11.	"The Waiting Song"	4:13
12.	"Served Faithfully"	2:53
13.	"Imperfectly"	3:45
Total length:		43:57

== Personnel ==
- Ani DiFranco – guitar, vocals, production
- Andy Stochansky – drums, percussion
- Geoff Perry – bass
- George Puleo – electric guitar
- Greg Horn – trumpet
- Tim Allan — mandolin
- Mary Ramsey — viola

=== Production ===
- Ani DiFranco – record producer
- Ed Stone – producer, mastering, engineer
- Tony Romano – engineer
- Scot Fisher – photography
