= Emmie (singer) =

English singer-songwriter (born 1977)

- Born: Emma Sarah Morton-Smith; 7 August 1977 (age 49)
- Origin: Stockport, England
- Education: Stockport College
- Genres: Pop; dance
- Occupations: Singer; presenter
- Years active: 1998–present
- Labels: Manifesto; Indirect; Telstar; Decode; Concept Music; Sony Music

Emma Sarah Morton-Smith (born 7 August 1977) is an English singer-songwriter and presenter.

== Music career ==
After completing a GNVQ qualification in Fashion Design at Stockport College, Emmie became known for the UK No. 5 hit single "More Than This" in 1999, a cover version of Roxy Music's 1982 song. She became the singer of the track when she met record producer Mark Hadfield (of bands Loveland, Urban Cookie Collective, Rhythm Quest, Lucid & Lovefreekz) at a party in their hometown. Bryan Ferry gave his blessing.

Also in 1999, she was featured in the video for the single "Your Caress" by DJ Flavours.

While a student at Stockport College, she frequented the same nightclub that Sarah Harding from Girls Aloud used to promote. A second single, "I Thought It Was You" was planned to be released in 2000 but was cancelled. The single would finally be released digitally in 2014.

Another solo single, "I Won't Let You Down", with W.I.P., was released on 4 February 2002, a cover of the 1982 song by Ph.D. This reached No. 53 on the UK Singles Chart. Apart from that, only one other low-profile release appeared under the "Emmie" name, "You Only Hurt (The One You Love)" (1999).

Under the name Indien, with producer and husband Mark Hadfield, the single "Show Me Love" was released on 28 July 2003 and reached No. 69 on the UK Singles Chart. The single "Who's the Daddy?" followed on 29 September 2003, with her as part of the group Lovebug, and was featured in an advertisement for Asda's George clothing range in the same year. This reached No. 35 in the UK.

== Presenting career and other projects ==
Since 2004, Emmie has been focused on her presenting career. In late 2004, she won a competition for 'Traffic Idol' on the North West regional radio station, 105.4 Century FM, to become the new afternoon traffic and travel presenter on Century, and on the Manchester frequency of Capital Gold. However, as of 2008, she no longer works for GMG Radio as a co-presenter on Century FM. She was a presenter on Heart Yorkshire where she co-hosted the Dixie and Emma Drivetime Show. She was a celebrity reporter on Channel M, has a regular presenter slot on QVC, and does web presenting, on sites such as videotile.co.uk. She has also presented Noddy's Electric Ladyland for Granada.

She started her own fashion business called Bigwardrobe.com, which is now defunct.

== Discography ==
=== Singles ===
- "More Than This '99" (1999), Manifesto FES52 - UK #5
- "You Only Hurt (The One You Love)" (1999, unreleased), Indirect Records IND05
- "I Thought It Was You" (2000, not released until 2014), Telstar STAS3144
- "I Won't Let You Down" (W.I.P. featuring Emmie) (2002), Decode/Telstar STAS3210 - UK #53
- "Show Me Love" (as Indien) (2003), Concept Music CON40 - UK #69
- "Who's the Daddy?" (as Lovebug), Sony Music 674270 - UK #35
