= 53 Days =

- Origin: Buffalo, New York, United States
- Genres: Rock
- Years active: 1996-Present
- Labels: Accidental Man, Buffalo Trax
- Members: John Moore; Denny Pelczynski; Bruce Wojick; Davey O; Steve Ryder
- Website: http://53days.com

53 Days is an American Rock band based in Western New York.

== Early years ==
John Moore began 53 Days in Buffalo, New York in 1996. The original line-up of 53 Days consisted mainly of Moore (vocals, guitar and keyboards), Tom Robinson (bass), Steve Ryder (guitar) and Mike Sands (drums). The 53 Days original sound was essentially roots rock, alt-pop that was primarily melodic and lyrical music. In the early incarnation, 53 Days created two albums independently for Accidental Man Records through 2000 and one for the Buffalo Trax label in 2001. Their first LP, Why Would You Care, sold slowly but spawned airplay with the upbeat single "Whole Inside". Their second CD titled "Hot Water Music" sold better and received acclaim yet failed to garner much attention outside of the northeast. However, the band saw the song "A Little Longer" named the #1 song for 1997 on WBNY-FM, and had "Nothing Hurts You Now" used in the TV shows "ER" and "The Promised Land".

A third album followed on the Buffalo Trax label produced by Gary Mallaber (Bruce Springsteen, Van Morrison, Eddie Money, Steve Miller) called "Concert Special". Fans have dubbed it the 'Red' CD. The single "Get A Little Lost" garnered regular rotation in Canada on CKEY-FM 101.1, Fort Erie/ Niagara Falls.

The band went on hiatus from summer 2002 until January 2005.

53 Days provided the song "Shelter Me" for the soundtrack album to the movie Lonestar State Of Mind. The movie featured John Mellencamp in a role. The songs "These Days" and "When it Goes 'round" were used in the film "Last Big Attraction", the latter over the closing credits.

53 Days recorded a cover of a Prince song with "The Cross" on the debut CD "Why Would You Care"

== Current activities ==
Recently reunited in 2005 the band self released a brand new four song EP titled "Weight Of The World" and has played some regional shows in the Western New York area only. This time joining the lineup to replace departed members Tom Robinson and Mike Sands are Bruce Wojick and Denny Pelcynski also of the Goo Goo Dolls produced band Klear as well as regional country music singer Davey O. Currently the band are working on new material for their forthcoming fourth album.

== Members ==
=== Current ===
- John Moore (vocals & various instruments; always a member)
- Davey O (bass; February 2005-)
- Bruce Wojick (guitar; February 2005-)
- Denny Pelcynski (drums; February 2005-)

=== Former ===
- Steve Ryder (guitar; 1996–2001, 2016-)
- Tom Robinson (bass guitar; 1996–2001, 2016-)
- Mike Sands (drums; 1996–2001)
- Geno McManus (bass guitar; 2001)

=== Additional members on recordings ===
- Maria Sebastion (Vocals; Concert Special (RED) CD)
- Ben Wilson from Blues Traveler (Hammond B3; Hot Water Music CD)
- Gary Mallaber (Percussion; Concert Special (RED) CD)
- Catherine Carfagna (Vocals; Accordion)
- Joe Mergler (Vocals; Piano)
- Brian Walnicki (Viola, Mandolin; Hot Water Music, Concert Special CD)

== Discography ==
- Why Would You Care - (1996)
- Hot Water Music CD - (1998)
- Concert Special - (2001)
- Weight of the World - EP - (2007)
