= John Lombardo =

American musical artist (born 1952)

- John Lombardo playing guitar in 2019

Background information
- Born: September 30, 1952 (age 73); Jamestown, New York, United States
- Origin: Buffalo, New York, United States
- Genres: Folk rock, alternative rock
- Occupations: Musician, songwriter, producer
- Instruments: Guitar, bass, vocals
- Years active: 1981–present
- Labels: Christian Burial, Elektra, Rykodisc, Geffen, Bar/None

John Lombardo (born 30 September 1952) is one of the founding members of the American alternative rock band 10,000 Maniacs and one of the band's most influential members, writing much of its early material, also being its oldest member in age. He is also a member of folk rock duo John & Mary.

== Biography ==
Called by the Buffalo News "a dominant force" in the Maniacs, Lombardo was in the group from its inception in 1981 until he left in 1986 after the release of their first major-label album The Wishing Chair, disagreeing with the direction of the band and frustrated with the lack of success. "I think I just really ran out of gas," Lombardo explained to The Morning Call in 1997. "It was very much a nomadic, gypsy lifestyle, even though we were on a major label (Elektra). We weren't making very much money and it just got very frustrating for me. I needed a breather to find out what my own life was about."

Lombardo then formed the folk rock duo John & Mary with the classically trained Mary Ramsey, who played violin and viola for 10,000 Maniacs and sang backing vocals on the 1993 album MTV Unplugged. The pair made two recordings under the name John & Mary, Victory Gardens in 1991 and 1993's The Weedkiller's Daughter. Lombardo remained on cordial terms with his former band, with two Maniacs (Rob Buck and Jerry Augustyniak) appearing as guest performers on their albums, and John and Mary opened for the 10,000 Maniacs on tour. Lombardo would also work with the band in 1990 to remaster Hope Chest, a compilation of their first two albums, released in 1990.

Lombardo returned to the Maniacs in 1994 after Natalie Merchant's departure, with Ramsey joining as the lead singer. The duo released two albums with the Maniacs: 1997's Love Among the Ruins, which contained a cover of the Roxy Music song "More Than This" that did well in the U.S. charts; and 1999's The Earth Pressed Flat. In 2002, after leaving the Maniacs following the death of guitarist Rob Buck, John & Mary released The Pinwheel Galaxy and then Peace Bridge (2007) under the name John & Mary and the Valkyries.

Lombardo continues to perform regularly with John & Mary and has rejoined 10,000 Maniacs as a touring member, contributing to their 2015 album Twice Told Tales, performing on their 2016 live album Playing Favorites, and playing regular gigs with the band.

== Discography ==
=== With 10,000 Maniacs ===
- Human Conflict Number Five (EP) (1982)
- Secrets of the I Ching (1983)
- The Wishing Chair (1985)
- Hope Chest: The Fredonia Recordings 1982-1983 (1990)
- Love Among the Ruins (1997)
- The Earth Pressed Flat (1999)
- Campfire Songs: The Popular, Obscure and Unknown Recordings (2004)
- Twice Told Tales (2015)
- Playing Favorites (2016)
- Live at the Belly Up (2017)

=== With John & Mary ===
- Victory Gardens (1991)
- The Weedkiller's Daughter (1993)
- The Pinwheel Galaxy (2002)

=== With John & Mary & the Valkyries ===
- Peace Bridge (2007)
