= Lazlo Hollyfeld =

American art rock band

- Origin: Buffalo, New York, United States
- Genres: Instrumental, post-rock, art rock, indie-rock
- Years active: 2003–present
- Members: Chris Gangarossa; Scott Molloy; Matt Felski; Sonny Baker; Chris Groves; Dave Calos
- Past members: Jeff Mcleod; Bill Wachowiak; Tim Gerland; Kevin Raczka; Jeff Evans
- Website: www.lazlohollyfeld.com

Lazlo Hollyfeld is an American art rock band from Buffalo, New York.

== History ==
The band was formed in winter 2003 in Buffalo, New York. The bass guitarist, Chris Gangarossa, and the keyboard player, Scott Molloy, began focusing on creating instrumental sound based on rhythms and textures. They later added the guitarist, Jeff Mcleod, and the drummer, Matt Felski. The band's name is a reference to the character played by Jon Gries in the 1985 film Real Genius, starring Val Kilmer.

The band's first album, Our Universe is Feeding, was released in 2004. In late 2005, the group released The Pacer EP. Lazlo Hollyfeld played two extended United States concert tours, including appearances at South by Southwest and two nights at The Boom Boom Room in San Francisco with Mike Clark and Robert Walters. In 2006, they released their second album, Sailfish.

In November 2007, the band finished recording its third release, Elimination, and the fourth album, Desert, a concept album released on May 29, 2010.

The band is still active in 2025 performing live at small venues. In 2021 they released their live performances on streaming platforms under the name Lazlo Hollyfeld at Nietzsche's (Live) a short album containing ten songs that were recorded live.

== Discography ==
=== Albums and EPs ===
- Our Universe Is Feeding (2004)
- The Pacer EP (2005)
- Sailfish (2006)
- Elimination (2007)
- Desert (2010)
- Lazlo Hollyfeld at Nietzsche's (Live) (2021)
