= Klear =

American rock band

- Origin: Buffalo, New York, United States
- Genres: Rock
- Years active: 1998-Present
- Label: Good Charamel Records
- Members: Fred Shafer; Bruce Wojick; Leo MacDonald; Denny Pelczynski
- Website: Klear Fred Shafer Bruce Wojick

Klear (stylized as "klear") is an American rock band based in Western New York. The band's debut and second album was produced by Goo Goo Dolls bassist Robby Takac and released on Takac's independent Record label.

== Background ==
The band's members are Fred Shafer on vocals and guitar, Bruce Wojick on lead guitar, Leo MacDonald on bass guitar, and Denny Pelczynski on drums. Previous frontmen include Joe Cafarella (STEMM) and A.D. Lewis (both during Shafer's absence). While Lewis fronted the band, they also had Dan DeLano on keyboards. The band has released four albums, 7500 Miles, Makin' Noise, 10 Seconds to Burn and Eyes Wide Open.

klear songs have been used in films and trailers including "Beautiful End" in The Station Agent, "Comeback" in the FX series The Shield and "Mr. Cracker" on Ultimate Fighting Championship's UFC 37.5: As Real as it Gets.

The band has been asked to play at some of the most prestigious venues across the US including the Viper Room, House of Blues (Mandalay Bay/ Las Vegas), Whisky a Go Go, CBGB, and The Keyclub in Hollywood.

On July 20, 2008, it was announced that the original vocalist, Fred Shafer, would be performing with the band during the August 21 edition of Thursday at the Square in Buffalo. At the show, Shafer announced that he would be officially returning to the band while continuing to pursue his solo career, as Joe Cafarella would be leaving to focus on STEMM.

== Members ==
- Fred Shafer – vocals, guitar
- Bruce Wojick – lead guitar
- Leo MacDonald – bass guitar
- Denny Pelczynski – drums

=== Former members ===
- Danny Wiedenbeck – drums
- Joe Cafarella – vocals
- A.D. Lewis – vocals
- Dan DeLano – keyboard

== Discography ==
The band has released four albums, 7500 Miles, Makin' Noise, 10 Seconds to Burn and Eyes Wide Open.

=== 7500 Miles (2002) ===
7500 Miles is klear's first full-length album. It was released independently and sold at the band's live performances, at various local retailers in the Buffalo, New York, area, and online through the band's website and various online retailers.

=== Makin' Noise (2004) ===
Makin' Noise is klear's second full-length album, originally released on September 28, 2004 through Robby Takac's Good Charamel Records label.

=== 10 Seconds to Burn (2006) ===
10 Seconds to Burn is klear's third full-length album. It has Joe Cafarella of STEMM on vocals, as klear's frontman, Fred Shafer, took a break from the band. It was released on November 22, 2006, through Robby Takac's Good Charamel Records label, and was sold through klear's website, at the band's concerts, and through various Western New York retailers.
