= Babik =

Village in Vologda Oblast, Russia

Babik Бабик
- Village
- Location within Vologda Oblast Location within Russia
- Coordinates: 59°26′N 39°12′E
- Country: Russia
- Region: Vologda Oblast
- District: Vologodsky District
- Time zone: UTC+3:00

Babik (Russian: Бабик) is a rural locality (a village) in Kubenskoye Rural Settlement, Vologodsky District, Vologda Oblast, Russia. The population was 7 as of 2002.

== Geography ==
Babik is located 71 km northwest of Vologda (the district's administrative centre) by road. Yefimovo is the nearest rural locality.
