= The Earth Pressed Flat =

Studio album by 10,000 Maniacs
- Released: 20 April 1999
- Genre: Rock
- Length: 55:38
- Label: Bar/None Records
- Producer: Armand John Petri

10,000 Maniacs chronology
Love Among the Ruins (1997)	The Earth Pressed Flat (1999)	Campfire Songs: The Popular, Obscure and Unknown Recordings of 10,000 Maniacs (2004)

Professional ratings
Review scores
Source	Rating
Allmusic	link
Entertainment Weekly	C− link
The Phoenix	link
The Rolling Stone Album Guide	1.5/5 stars

The Earth Pressed Flat is the seventh album by 10,000 Maniacs, released in 1999. The album contains nine songs that had been written for, but not used in, the band's previous album, Love Among the Ruins: "The Earth Pressed Flat", "Once a City", "On & On (Mersey Song)", "Somebody's Heaven", "Cabaret", "Beyond the Blue", "Smallest Step", "Time Turns" and "Hidden in My Heart". "Beyond the Blue" and "Time Turns" had been released on the single "More Than This", but were re-recorded for this album.

All tracks are credited to 10,000 Maniacs as a band for royalty purposes, though the lyricists of the songs received additional credit. Dennis Drew wrote "Ellen", "Glow", "Smallest Step" and "Rainbows". John Lombardo wrote "The Earth Pressed Flat", "Once a City", "On & On (Mersey Song)", "Beyond the Blue" and "Time Turns". Lombardo and Drew shared writing credit on "Hidden in My Heart". Lombardo, Mary Ramsey and Rob Buck shared writing credit on "Somebody's Heaven".

== Track listing ==
1. "The Earth Pressed Flat" – 4:11
2. "Ellen" – 3:27
3. "Once a City" – 4:22
4. "Glow" – 2:31
5. "On & On (Mersey Song)" – 3:32
6. "Somebody's Heaven" – 4:41
7. "Cabaret" – 3:02
8. "Beyond the Blue" – 3:17
9. "Smallest Step" – 3:32
10. "In the Quiet Morning" – 2:53
11. "Time Turns" – 3:49
12. "Hidden in My Heart" – 4:18
13. "Who Knows Where the Time Goes" – 6:40
14. "Rainbows" – 5:16 (hidden track, US release)

== Personnel ==
10,000 Maniacs

- Mary Ramsey – violin, viola, vocals
- Robert Buck – guitar
- John Lombardo – acoustic and electric guitar, package concept
- Dennis Drew – synthesizer, piano, keyboards, Hammond organ, pump organ
- Steve Gustafson – bass guitar
- Jerome Augustyniak – percussion, drums, vocals

Technical staff

- John Caruso – engineer
- Armand John Petri – producer, engineer
- Blair Woods – coordination,
- John Lombardo – graphic design, album artwork
- Nick Balgona – mastering
