= Not So Soft =

Studio album by Ani DiFranco
- Released: November 1, 1991
- Genre: Indie rock, folk rock
- Length: 47:29
- Label: Righteous Babe
- Producer: Dale Anderson, Ani DiFranco

Ani DiFranco chronology
Ani DiFranco (1990)	Not So Soft (1991)	Imperfectly (1992)

Professional ratings
Review scores
Source	Rating
AllMusic	3/5 stars
The Rolling Stone Album Guide	3.5/5 stars
Slant	3/5 stars

Not So Soft is the second studio album by American singer-songwriter Ani DiFranco, released in 1991.

== Track listing ==
All tracks are written by Ani DiFranco

No.	Title	Length
1.	"Anticipate"	3:16
2.	"Rockabye"	4:28
3.	"She Says"	3:32
4.	"Make Me Stay"	3:06
5.	"On Every Corner"	4:15
6.	"Small World"	3:39
7.	"Not So Soft"	1:57
8.	"Roll With It"	3:44
9.	"Itch"	2:58
10.	"Gratitude"	3:09
11.	"The Whole Night"	2:42
12.	"The Next Big Thing"	3:36
13.	"Brief Bus Stop"	3:36
14.	"Looking for the Holes"	3:31
Total length:		47:29

== Personnel ==
- Ani DiFranco – vocals, acoustic guitar, congas, sound effects, production, arrangement, artwork, cover design

Technical

- Dale Anderson – record producer
- Tony Romano – editing, engineer
- Don Wilkinson – editing
- Suzi McGowan – artwork
- Scot Fisher – photography
- Karen Richardson – photography
- Suzi McGowan – typesetting
