= Ani DiFranco (album) =

Studio album by Ani DiFranco
- Released: November 1, 1990
- Recorded: September 1990
- Studio: Audio Magic, Buffalo, New York
- Genre: Indie rock; folk
- Length: 46:12
- Label: Righteous Babe
- Producer: Dale Anderson; Ani DiFranco

Ani DiFranco chronology
Ani DiFranco (1990)	Not So Soft (1991)

Professional ratings
Review scores
Source	Rating
AllMusic	4/5 stars
The Rolling Stone Album Guide	3.5/5 stars
Slant	3.5/5 stars

Ani DiFranco is the debut album of the singer-songwriter Ani DiFranco, released in 1990.

== Track listing ==
All songs by Ani DiFranco

Side A

1. "Both Hands" – 3:38
2. "Talk to Me Now" – 4:29
3. "The Slant" – 1:36
4. "Work Your Way Out" – 4:08
5. "Dog Coffee" – 2:56
6. "Lost Woman Song" – 4:50
7. "Pale Purple" – 4:02

Side B

8. "Rush Hour" – 5:03
9. "Fire Door" – 2:42
10. "The Story" – 3:30
11. "Every Angle" – 2:44
12. "Out of Habit" – 2:45
13. "Letting the Telephone Ring" – 4:30

== Personnel ==
- Ani DiFranco – acoustic guitar, vocals

=== Production ===
- Ani DiFranco – record producer
- Dale Anderson – producer
- John Caruso – engineer
- Ed Stone – mastering
- Scot Fisher – photography
- Dave Meinzer – artwork
