= Love Among the Ruins (album) =

Studio album by 10,000 Maniacs
- Released: June 17, 1997
- Genre: Rock
- Length: 49:19
- Label: Geffen
- Producers: Fred Maher; John Keane

10,000 Maniacs chronology
MTV Unplugged (1993)	Love Among the Ruins (1997)	The Earth Pressed Flat (1999)

Singles from Love Among the Ruins
- 1. "More Than This" Released: June 1997; 2. "Rainy Day" Released: November 4, 1997

Professional ratings
Review scores
Source	Rating
AllMusic	link
The A.V. Club	(average) link
Entertainment Weekly	B− link
The Rolling Stone Album Guide	2.5/5 stars

Love Among the Ruins is the sixth studio album by American alternative rock band 10,000 Maniacs and the first to feature new lead singer Mary Ramsey, following Natalie Merchant's departure in 1993.

== Background ==
The two singles from the album—a cover of Roxy Music's "More Than This" and the original "Rainy Day"—were not initially intended to be included on the album. John Lombardo had just written "Rainy Day", which was deemed more radio-friendly than the other songs, and the record company insisted that the band record a cover song for inclusion.

While Ramsey and Lombardo shared lyric writing duties, the band chose to credit the songs as group collaborations, so that all members would receive equal royalties. Ramsey wrote the music to "All That Never Happens". Guitarist John Lombardo wrote "Rainy Day", "Even with My Eyes Closed", "Big Star", "Shining Light" and "Across the Fields" and shared a writing credit with drummer Jerry Augustyniak on "Girl on a Train". Guitarist Rob Buck wrote "Love Among the Ruins" and keyboardist Dennis Drew wrote "A Room for Everything". A live version of "Rainy Day" was also included on their 2016 album Playing Favorites.

The album title is adapted from Robert Browning's poem of the same name.

== Track listing ==
All songs written by 10,000 Maniacs, except where noted.

No.	Title	Writer(s)	Length
1.	"Rainy Day"		4:46
2.	"Love Among the Ruins"	10,000 Maniacs, Jules Shear	4:01
3.	"Even with My Eyes Closed"		3:56
4.	"Girl on a Train"		4:11
5.	"Green Children"		4:14
6.	"A Room for Everything"		3:56
7.	"More Than This"	Bryan Ferry	4:06
8.	"Big Star"		3:07
9.	"You Won't Find Me There"	10,000 Maniacs, Jules Shear	4:09
10.	"All That Never Happens"		4:59
11.	"Shining Light"	10,000 Maniacs, Jules Shear	4:06
12.	"Across the Fields"		3:53

- On an earlier acetate version of the album, "Smallest Step", "Beyond the Blue" and "Time Turns" were also included. When all three were omitted, the following tracks were added: "More Than This", "Rainy Day" and "All That Never Happens". All three omitted songs were re-recorded, with "Beyond the Blue" and "Time Turns" made available on U.S. and European versions of the "More Than This" single and "Smallest Step" appearing on 1999's The Earth Pressed Flat.

== Release ==
Love Among the Ruins sold 200,000 copies, 30,000 of those within three months of release. Despite this, Geffen Records, according to Dennis Drew, "dropped us after the first three months."

== Personnel ==
10,000 Maniacs

- Mary Ramsey – lead vocals, viola
- Robert Buck – electric and acoustic guitars
- John Lombardo – acoustic and electric guitars
- Dennis Drew – Hammond organ, piano
- Steve Gustafson – bass
- Jerome Augustyniak – drums, backing vocals, percussion

Additional Musicians

- John Keane – guitar
- Jules Shear – backing vocals
- Fred Maher – percussion

Technical Staff

- Billy Field – assistant engineer
- Chris Lord-Alge – mixing
- John Keane – producer, engineer
- Fred Maher – producer
- Doug Sax – mastering
- John Lombardo – cover design
- Mike McLaughlin – photography
- Lloyd Puckett – engineer
- Paul Miletti – production manager

== Singles ==
More Than This (U.S.)

1. "More Than This"
2. "More Than This" (Tee's Radio Edit)
3. "Beyond the Blue"

More Than This (Australia)

1. "More Than This"
2. "More Than This" (Tee's Radio Edit)
3. "Time Turns"

Rainy Day (Radio Promo Only)

1. "Rainy Day (Radio Edit)"
2. "Rainy Day (Album Version)"
