= Alison Pipitone =

American singer-songwriter

Alison Pipitone is an American rock 'n' roll singer, songwriter, professor, and guitarist. She has released a total of nine albums, both as a solo artist and with the Alison Pipitone Band, the most recent being 2013's "Big Wide World" on Slice Records.

Her music is characterized as a rollicking hybrid of alt-rock and boogie blues with forays into classic country and American folk.

== Early life ==
Alison Pipitone was born and raised in Buffalo, New York until she was 10, when her mom moved to San Diego, California. Pipitone lived between Buffalo and California. Inspired by artists including The Clash, Etta James, the Pretenders, and Dolly Parton, Pipitone began playing guitar at the age of 18. With divorced parents living on opposite sides of the country, she split her teen years between Hamburg, New York, (just south of Buffalo) and San Diego, California.

== Career ==
Pipitone was inducted into the Buffalo Music Hall of Fame in 2017.

Pipitone's professional career began in Los Angeles in the late 1980s, playing rhythm guitar in the band The Monas with her sister Natalie Howes on vocals and keys; brother Damon, on drums and sister Gabrielle Hangen on bass. Gabrielle left the band a short time later and Aaron Britt took over as the bass player. When the grunge movement took hold in the early 1990s, Pipitone returned to Western New York and launched a career as a solo artist. In 1995, she released her debut recording, Life in the First Person.

In reviewing the album for the North County Times, writer Jim Trageser noted "Pipitone's music is what gives her lyrics their power. Hard-edged and contemporary, her music is along the lines of Sheryl Crow or Joan Osborne. Like Crow, Pipitone's rough, nasal vocals are half-sung, half-spoken. And she also plays some mean guitar."

Pipitone continued to hone her craft over the next decade with five more solo albums. In 1997, Pipitone wrote and performed the song Dynamite for the soundtrack to the motion picture All Over Me. In 2006, The Alison Pipitone Band made its debut with the album Tiger Babies. The band followed up with 2009's "Me and Miss Grimes" and 2013's "Big Wide World." In reviewing Big Wide World, Art Voice critic Geoff Kelly said the album shows that Pipitone "knows how to write a hook like nobody's business."

A fixture on the Buffalo music scene for nearly two decades, Pipitone has earned the Buffalo Music Award for Top Original Female Vocalist nine times and The Alison Pipitone Band earned the Top Original Rock Band Award in 2005 and 2009. Pipitone has earned a reputation as the "high priestess" of the Buffalo rock scene through her live performances and lengthy discography. In addition to touring the United States, Pipitone has appeared on the bill of various music festivals, including North by Northeast in Toronto, the Crossroads Music Conference in Cleveland and The Great Blue Heron Music Festival in Sherman, New York She has served as a support act for performers including Barenaked Ladies, Joan Jett and the Blackhearts and Lilith Fair.

Pipitone is a adjunct lecturer, tutor and professor at SUNY Fredonia and Hilbert College for music and writing.

== Discography ==
=== With The Alison Pipitone Band ===
- Big Wide World (2013)
- Me and Miss Grimes (2009)
- Tiger Babies (2006)

=== As a solo artist ===
- Retrodyne (2004)
- I'll Ask Her (2002)
- Shake It Around (2000)
- Like Being Born (1998)
- Down To Money (1997)
- Life in the First Person (1995)

== Music videos ==
- Roller Derby Queen (2010)
- When Down Tumbling Down (2012)
- Helpless (2014)
