= Oskar Saville =

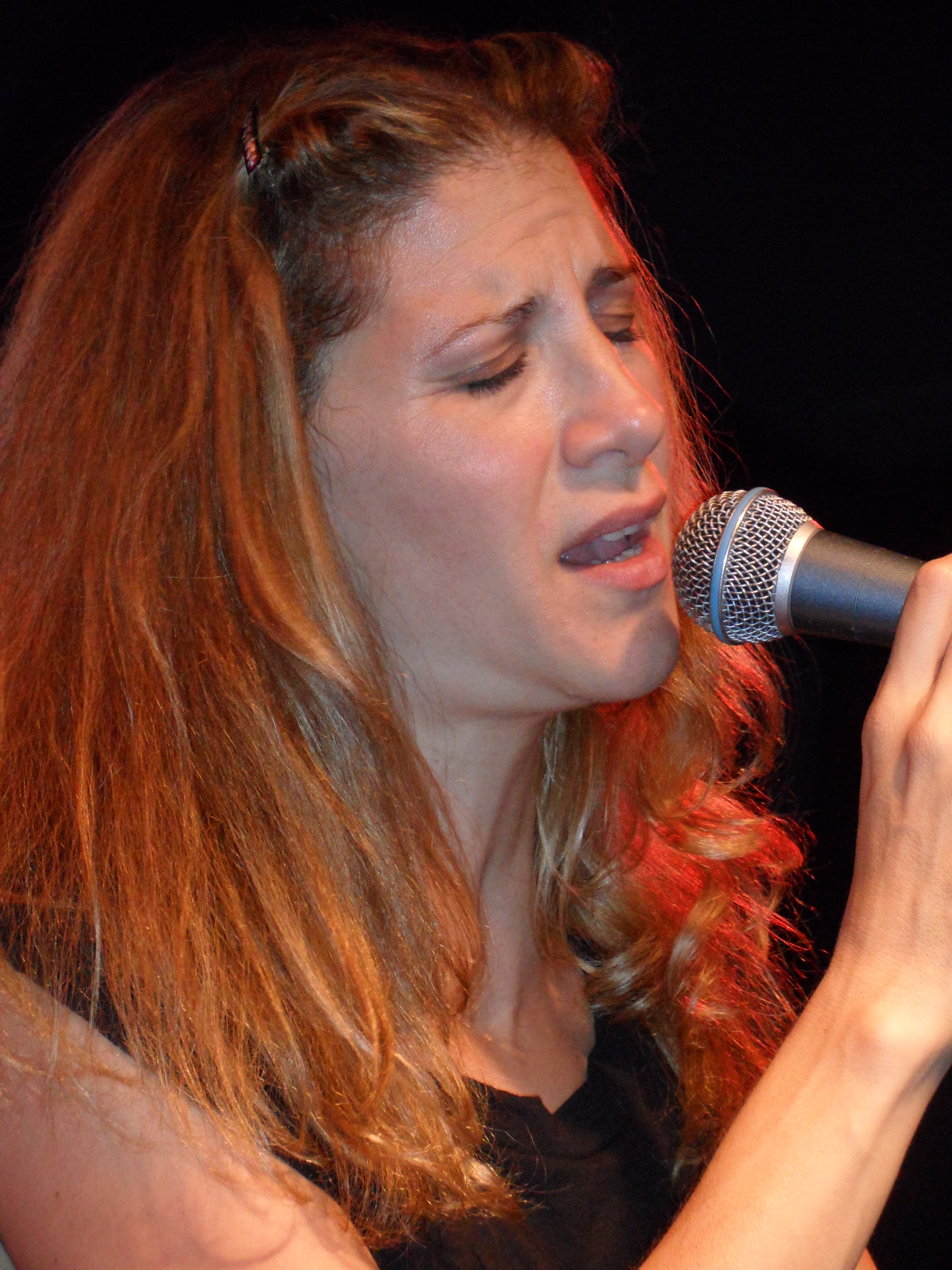
- With Rubygrass in 2011

Background information
- Origin: United States
- Genres: Alternative rock Folk rock
- Occupation: Musician
- Years active: 1996–present
- Formerly of: 10,000 Maniacs
- Website: Oskar Saville.com

Oskar Saville is a former lead singer of Chicago-based band Rubygrass and also a solo artist. She served as lead vocalist for 10,000 Maniacs from 2002 to 2007, and is now a "transformational energy coach" and psychic.

== Discography ==
Rubygrass

- Fireflies (1998)

Solo

- A Girl Named Oskar (2003)

10,000 Maniacs

- Live Twenty-Five (2006)
- Extended Versions (condensed version of Live Twenty-Five) (2009)
