= More than This (Roxy Music song) =

1982 single by Roxy Music

Single by Roxy Music

from the album Avalon
- B-side: "India"
- Released: March 1982
- Genre: Soft rock; pop; synth-pop; sophisti-pop; lounge-rock
- Length: 4:30 (album version); 4:10 (7-inch single version)
- Label: Polydor; Warner Bros.; E.G.; Atco
- Songwriter: Bryan Ferry
- Producers: Rhett Davies; Roxy Music

Roxy Music singles chronology
"Jealous Guy" (1981)	"More than This" (1982)	"Avalon" (1982)

"More than This" is a song by the English rock band Roxy Music. It was released in March 1982 as the first single from their eighth and final studio album, Avalon (1982). "More than This" was the group's last top-10 UK hit, peaking at No. 6 on the UK Singles Chart, and also charted in the United States, reaching No. 58 on the Billboard Rock Top Tracks chart.

"More than This" has become one of Roxy Music's most popular tracks. American alternative rock band 10,000 Maniacs released a cover version in 1997 that peaked at No. 25 in the US, and British singer Emmie released a cover that reached No. 5 in the UK in January 1999. The cover of the single's release is the painting Veronica Veronese, by Dante Gabriel Rossetti, which was completed in 1872 with Alexa Wilding as the model.

== Composition ==
The song was written by lead vocalist Bryan Ferry, who has stated in interviews that he began writing the songs for Avalon while on the western coast of Ireland, which he believes contributed to the dark melancholy of the album. "More than This" is somewhat unusual for a pop song in that Ferry's lead vocals end 1 minute and 45 seconds before the song does, leaving the remainder as a synthesizer-driven instrumental outro.

== Personnel ==
Musicians

- Bryan Ferry – lead vocals, keyboards
- Phil Manzanera – lead guitar
- Andy Mackay – saxophone
- Neil Hubbard – guitar
- Alan Spenner – bass guitar
- Jimmy Maelen – percussion
- Fonzi Thornton – backing vocals
- Andy Newmark – drums

== Charts ==
=== Weekly charts ===
Weekly chart performance for "More than This"
Chart (1982)	Peak position
Australia (Kent Music Report)	6
Belgium (Ultratop 50 Flanders)	14
Ireland (IRMA)	6
Luxembourg Radio	3
Netherlands (Dutch Top 40)	24
Netherlands (Single Top 100)	25
New Zealand (Recorded Music NZ)	12
Norway (VG-lista)	2
Spain (AFYVE)	25
Sweden (Sverigetopplistan)	17
Switzerland (Schweizer Hitparade)	6
UK Singles (OCC)	6
US Mainstream Rock (Billboard)	58
West Germany (GfK)	24

=== Year-end charts ===
Year-end chart performance for "More than This"
Chart (1982)	Position
Australia (Kent Music Report)	49

== Certifications ==
Certifications and sales for "More than This"
Region	Certification	Certified units/sales
United Kingdom (BPI)	Gold	400,000^{‡}
^{‡} Sales+streaming figures based on certification alone.

== Cover versions ==
In 1997, a cover performed by 10,000 Maniacs with Mary Ramsey on lead vocals was released as a single from their album Love Among the Ruins and became a US hit, reaching No. 25 on the Billboard Hot 100 in the week ending 29 August 1997. It also debuted at its peak position of No. 87 on the UK Singles Chart in the week ending 28 September 1997. The video for the cover was filmed at House on the Rock. A live version was also included on their 2016 album Playing Favorites.

English singer-songwriter Emmie recorded a cover of the song and released it as a single on 11 January 1999. Produced by Mark Hadfield and Adam Carter-Ryan, her version of the song peaked at No. 5 on the UK Singles Chart, No. 25 on the Irish Singles Chart, and No. 39 in the Flanders region of Belgium. It ended 1999 at No. 153 on the UK year-end chart.

Bill Murray's character Bob Harris performs a karaoke version of "More than This" in the 2003 Sofia Coppola film Lost in Translation. This version is available as a hidden track at the end of the film's soundtrack album. Coppola and Murray selected the song for inclusion during the filming of the movie. As Tom Nicholson wrote in Empire, "It's absolutely perfect. [Murray] makes for a weary, fragile kind of Bryan Ferry, the lounge lizard who's lost the ability to really connect. He takes a shot before his first line then barely opens his mouth to sing, either too exhausted or too numb to really let go."
