= Bootsy Collins discography =

This is the discography of American musician Bootsy Collins.

== Albums ==
Year	Band	Album title	Peak chart positions		Certification	Record label
Year	Band	Album title	US 200	US R&B	Certification	Record label
1976	Bootsy's Rubber Band	Stretchin' Out in Bootsy's Rubber Band	59	10		Warner Bros. Records
1977	Bootsy's Rubber Band	Ahh... The Name Is Bootsy, Baby!	16	1	US: Gold	Warner Bros. Records
1978	Bootsy's Rubber Band	Bootsy? Player of the Year	16	1	US: Gold	Warner Bros. Records
1979	Bootsy's Rubber Band	This Boot Is Made for Fonk-N	52	9		Warner Bros. Records
1980	Bootsy Collins	Ultra Wave	70	30		Warner Bros. Records
1980	The Sweat Band	Sweat Band	—	—		Uncle Jam/Columbia Records
1982	Bootsy Collins	The One Giveth, the Count Taketh Away	120	18		Warner Bros. Records
1988	Bootsy Collins	What's Bootsy Doin'?	—	58		Columbia Records
1990	Bootsy's Rubber Band	Jungle Bass	—	—		4th & Broadway
1992	Praxis	Transmutation	—	—		Axiom
1992	Hardware	Third Eye Open	—	—		Rykodisc/Polystar
1994	Bootsy's New Rubber Band	Blasters of the Universe	—	—		Rykodisc
1994	Zillatron	Lord of the Harvest	—	—		Rykodisc
1994	Praxis	Sacrifist	—	—		Subharmonic
1995	Bootsy's New Rubber Band	Keepin' Dah Funk Alive 4-1995	—	—		Rykodisc
1997	Bootsy Collins	Fresh Outta 'P' University	—	—		WEA/Black Culture
1998	Bootsy's Rubber Band	Live in Louisville 1978	—	—		Disky
2001	Bootsy's Rubber Band	Live in Oklahoma 1976	—	—		Funk to the Max
2002	Bootsy Collins	Play with Bootsy	—	—		WEA International
2006	Bootsy's New Rubber Band	Live in Concert 1998	—	—		ABC Entertainment/Charly Films
2006	Bootsy Collins	Christmas Is 4 Ever	—	—		Shout Factory
2008	Science Faxtion	Living on Another Frequency	—	—		Mascot Records
2009	Bootsy Collins	The Official Boot-Legged-Bootsy-CD	—	—		Bootzilla
2011	Bootsy Collins	Tha Funk Capital of the World	—	43		Mascot Records
2017	Bootsy Collins	World Wide Funk	—	—		Mascot Records
2020	Bootsy Collins	The Power of the One	—	—		Bootzilla Records
2025	Bootsy Collins	Album of the Year #1 Funkateer	—	—		Bootzilla Records
"—" denotes releases that did not chart or were not released.

== Singles ==
Year	Single	Peak chart positions					Album
Year	Single	US R&B	AUS	UK	GER	SWI	Album
1976	"Stretching Out (In a Rubber Band)"	18	—	—	—	—	Strechin’ Out In Bootsy’s Rubber Band (Bootsy's Rubber Band)
1976	"I'd Rather Be with You"	25	—	—	—	—	Strechin’ Out In Bootsy’s Rubber Band (Bootsy's Rubber Band)
1977	"Psychoticbumpschool"	69	—	—	—	—	Strechin’ Out In Bootsy’s Rubber Band (Bootsy's Rubber Band)
1977	"The Pinocchio Theory"	6	—	51 (Note: Chart position is from the official UK "Breakers List".)	—	—	Ahh... The Name Is Bootsy, Baby! (Bootsy's Rubber Band)
1977	"Can't Stay Away"	19	—	—	—	—	Ahh... The Name Is Bootsy, Baby! (Bootsy's Rubber Band)
1978	"Bootzilla"	1	—	43	—	—	Bootsy? Player of the Year (Bootsy's Rubber Band)
1978	"Hollywood Squares"	17	—	—	—	—	Bootsy? Player of the Year (Bootsy's Rubber Band)
1979	"Jam Fan (Hot)"	13	—	—	—	—	This Boot Is Made for Fonk-N (Bootsy's Rubber Band)
1979	"Bootsy Get Live"	38	—	—	—	—	This Boot Is Made for Fonk-N (Bootsy's Rubber Band)
1979	"Under the Influence of a Groove"	—	—	—	—	—	This Boot Is Made for Fonk-N (Bootsy's Rubber Band)
1980	"Freak to Freak"	25	—	—	—	—	Sweat Band (Sweat Band)
1980	"Body Shop"	—	—	—	—	—	Sweat Band (Sweat Band)
1980	"Mug Push"	25	—	—	—	—	Ultra Wave (Bootsy Collins)
1981	"F-Encounter"	51	—	—	—	—	Ultra Wave (Bootsy Collins)
1981	"Is That My Song?"	—	—	—	—	—	Ultra Wave (Bootsy Collins)
1982	"Take a Lickin' and Keep on Kickin'"	29	—	—	—	—	The One Giveth, the Count Taketh Away (Bootsy Collins)
1982	"Shine-O-Myte (Rag Popping)"	78	—	—	—	—	The One Giveth, the Count Taketh Away (Bootsy Collins)
1982	"Body Slam!"	12	—	—	—	—	single only (Bootsy's Rubber Band)
1988	"Party on Plastic (What's Bootsy Doin'?)"	27	—	—	—	—	What's Bootsy Doin'? (Bootsy Collins)
1988	"1st One 2 the Egg Wins"	—	—	—	—	—	What's Bootsy Doin'? (Bootsy Collins)
1990	"Jungle Bass"	—	—	—	—	—	Jungle Bass (Bootsy's Rubber Band)
1994	"Hollywood Squares" (US promo only)	—	—	—	—	—	Back In The Day: The Best Of Bootsy Collins (Bootsy Collins)
1997	"I'm Leavin U (Gotta Go, Gotta Go)" (feat. MC Lyte)	—	—	78	59	—	Fresh Outta 'P' University (Bootsy Collins)
1998	"Do the Freak"	—	93	—	—	—	Fresh Outta 'P' University (Bootsy Collins)
1999	"Party Lick-A-Ble's"	—	—	77	—	—	Fresh Outta 'P' University (Bootsy Collins)
2002	"Play with Bootsy" (feat. Kelli Ali)	—	—	—	57	73	Play with Bootsy (Bootsy Collins)
2003	"Dance to the Music"	—	—	—	—	—	Play with Bootsy (Bootsy Collins)
2004	"Dreamship Surprise" (feat. Bonita) (GER only)	—	—	—	—	—	(T)Raumschiff Surprise - Periode 1: Die Songs (Various Artists)
2011	"Don't Take My Funk" (promo only)	—	—	—	—	—	Tha Funk Capital of the World (Bootsy Collins)
2017	"Worth My While" (feat. Kali Uchis)	—	—	—	—	—	World Wide Funk (Bootsy Collins)
2022	"Hip Hop Lollipop" (feat. Fantaazma)	—	—	—	—	—	Hip Hop Lollipop (non-album single)
2022	"Boot-A-Claus/Here 4 A Reason" (feat.Baby Triggy, Garry G7 Jenkins, Dreion, Fantaazma, Dmaub)	—	—	—	—	—	Boot-A-Clause/Here 4 A Reason (non-album single)
2023	"Funk Not Fight" (feat. Baby Triggy, Fantaazma)	—	—	—	—	—	Funk Not Fight (non-album single)
2024	"The Influencers" (feat. Fantaazma, Snoop Dogg, Dave Stewart, Westcoast Stone, Wiz Khalifa)	—	—	—	—	—	Album of the Year #1 Funkateer (Bootsy Collins)
2024	"Pure Perfection" (feat. Fantaazma)	—	—	—	—	—	Album of the Year #1 Funkateer (Bootsy Collins)
"—" denotes releases that did not chart or were not released.

== Soundtracks ==
"I'd Rather Be with You", from the album Stretchin' Out in Bootsy's Rubber Band was featured in the movie Baby Boy.

Collins recorded music for the animated television series Loonatics Unleashed.

Collins co-wrote, with Lyle Workman and performed on several songs in the soundtrack to 2007‘s Superbad. He performed with a reunion of the original JBs rhythm section: Phelps Collins, Clyde Stubblefield and Jabo Starks, and supplemented by Bernie Worrell.

== Other contributions ==
- In 1971, his band House Guests (a precursor to Bootsy's Rubber Band) recorded two, two-part singles, "What So Never The Dance" and "My Mind Set Me Free".
- In 1977, he played on the album A Blow for Me, a Toot to You by Fred Wesley and the Horny Horns.
- In 1978, he played on Bernie Worrell's album All the Woo in the World.
- In 1978, he played on Parlet's album Pleasure Principle.
- In 1979, he played on Parlet's album Invasion of the Booty Snatchers.
- In 1979, he played on the album Say Blow by Blow Backwards by Fred Wesley and the Horny Horns.
- In 1980, he played on Parlet's album Play Me or Trade Me.
- In 1980, he played on Zapp's album Zapp.
- In 1981, he produced and played on Godmoma's album Godmoma Here
- In 1987, he produced Mico Wave's sole album Cookin' from the Inside, Out!, from which two tracks ("Instant Replay" and "Misunderstood") appeared on the compilation album 6 Degrees of P-Funk (The Best of George Clinton and His Funk Family) under the artist "George Clinton & the P-Funk All Stars".
- In 1988, Bootsy co-produced (alongside George Clinton) the album Lifestyles of the Roach and Famous by INCorporated Thang Band (a P-Funk spin-off).
- In 1988, Collins played bass on "Big Enough", the first song on Keith Richards' album Talk Is Cheap.
- In 1990, he played guitar, bass, and contributed guest vocals on Deee-Lite's album World Clique, most notably on "Groove Is in the Heart", which hit No. 4 on the Billboard Hot 100.
- In 1990, he appeared on a track on Maceo Parker's album Roots Revisited.
- In 1990, he played on Bernie Worrell's album Funk of Ages.
- In 1991, he contributed bass and backing vocals to the album The Third Power by Material.
- In 1992, he produced Buckethead's first album Bucketheadland.
- In 1993, he played bass and guitar on the Last Poets' album Holy Terror.
- In 1993, he played on Bernie Worrell's album Blacktronic Science.
- In 1994, he contributed to the Soup Dragons' last album, Hydrophonic.
- In 1994, he played on the album The Final Blow by Fred Wesley and the Horny Horns.
- In 1995, he and other P-Funk members recorded the album Funkcronomicon under the name Axiom Funk.
- In 1996, Collins collaborated on George Clinton's album T.A.P.O.A.F.O.M.
- In 1996, he mixed an alternate take of the song "Silver City Children" (known as the 'Hip-notic Boot-si-phonic Mix') from SHAG's album Silver City.
- In 1999, Collins co-wrote "DJ Droga" with Argentinian funk duo Illya Kuryaki and the Valderramas for their album Leche
- In 1999, he appeared on Buckethead's album Monsters and Robots.
- In 2001, Collins provided vocals to the song "Weapon of Choice" from Fatboy Slim's album Halfway Between the Gutter and the Stars.
- In 2001, Collins provided bass and vocals for the song "Tear Me Down", on Gov't Mule's The Deep End Volume 1.
- In 2002, he appeared on the album The Exodus by Gospel Gangstaz.
- In 2002, Collins provided vocals to the title track on Fatboy Slim's EP Illuminati. He read a poem at the end of FatBoy Slims's release in the Late Night Tales DJ mix series.
- In 2002, Collins worked with the Lo Fidelity Allstars on their album Don't Be Afraid of Love. He has recorded with Praxis and with Buckethead on several occasions.
- In 2004, Collins performed on the title track on TobyMac's album Welcome to Diverse City.
- In 2004, he appeared on Nicole C. Mullen's album, Everyday People.
- In 2004, he appeared on Snoop Dogg's Rhythm & Gangsta album.
- In 2004, Collins was featured on the album True Love by Toots and the Maytals.
- In 2004, he performed a cover of "Power of Soul" on the tribute album Power of Soul: A Tribute to Jimi Hendrix.
- In 2009, Collins collaborated with Reflection Eternal, a duo made up of Talib Kweli and Hi-Tek, on the track "Internet Connection".
- In 2013, Collins was featured on the album "Defenders of the Faith" by the band Gospel Gangstaz.
- In 2017, Collins appears on "Captain Hook", the last song on Vulfpeck's album Mr. Finish Line.
- In 2018, Collins sang and played bass on "After The Storm" by Kali Uchis.
- In 2018, Collins appeared with Buckethead on two songs on Japanese metal band Asterism's album Ignition.
- In 2020, Collins appeared on "We Play the Funk" by Five Alarm Funk.
- In 2021, Collins was featured on multiple songs by Silk Sonic, a duo made up of Bruno Mars and Anderson .Paak, on their album An Evening with Silk Sonic.
- In 2022, Collins appeared on the single "Rocketship" by Fantaazma.
- In 2023, Collins released the single "Honeysuckle Neckbone" with BLK ODYSSY
- In 2023, Collins was featured on the song 8 Billion by Sirens Of Lesbos on their album Peace.

== Promotional videos ==
- Party on Plastic (What's Bootsy Doin'?) (1988)
- Undercova' Funk (Give Up the Funk) (feat. Snoop Dogg) (2002)
- Play With Bootsy (2002)
- Hip Hop Lollipop (feat. Fantaazma) (2022)
- Boot-A-Claus/Here 4 A Reason (feat.Baby Triggy, Garry G7 Jenkins, Dreion, Fantaazma, Dmaub) (2022)
- Funk Not Fight (feat. Baby Triggy, Fantaazma) (2023)
- The Influencers (feat. Fantaazma, Snoop Dogg, Dave Stewart, Westcoast Stone, Wiz Khalifa) (2024)
- Pure Perfection (feat. Fantaazma) (2024)
