= Back in the Day: The Best of Bootsy =

Greatest hits album by Bootsy Collins
- Released: 1994
- Recorded: 1976–1982
- Genre: Funk
- Length: 76:38
- Label: Warner Bros.
- Producers: Bootsy Collins, George Clinton; compilation producer: Alan Leeds

Bootsy Collins chronology
Blasters of the Universe (1993)	Back in the Day: The Best of Bootsy (1994)	Keepin' Dah Funk Alive 4-1995 (1995)

Professional ratings
Review scores
Source	Rating
Allmusic	4.5/5 stars

Back in the Day: The Best of Bootsy is a 1994 greatest hits compilation by Parliament-Funkadelic bassist Bootsy Collins. The album was released on the Warner Bros. Archives label. The album compiles all of the hit singles produced and performed by Bootsy Collins during the years 1976 to 1982, with the exception of the singles released from the album The One Giveth, the Count Taketh Away. The compilation is notable in that it features the pre-Rubber Band track "What's So Never The Dance", credited to the House Guests, as well as the live version of "Psychoticbumpschool" performed by Bootsy's Rubber Band at The Summit in Houston, Texas on October 31, 1976. It also features the track "Scenery", the B-side to the "Mug Push" single, which was never featured on any of Bootsy Collins' albums.

== Tracks ==
1. Ahh... The Name Is Bootsy, Baby!
2. "Stretchin' Out (In a Rubber Band)"
3. "The Pinocchio Theory"
4. "Hollywood Squares"
5. "I'd Rather Be With You"
6. "Bootzilla"
7. "What's So Never The Dance"
8. "Can't Stay Away"
9. "Jam Fan (Hot)"
10. "Mug Push"
11. "Body Slam"
12. "Scenery"
13. "Vanish in Our Sleep"
14. "Psychoticbumpschool (Live)"

== International Friendship Exhibition ==
A copy of Back in the Day is featured in the International Friendship Exhibition, a museum in North Korea that houses gifts given to the Kim dynasty by foreign visitors.
