= Live in Oklahoma 1976 =

Live album by Bootsy Collins

Live album by Bootsy's Rubber Band
- Released: 2001
- Recorded: November 1976
- Genre: Funk
- Length: 48:09
- Label: Disky Communications
- Producer: Bootsy Collins

Bootsy's Rubber Band chronology
Live in Louisville 1978	Live in Oklahoma 1976 (2001)	Play With Bootsy (2002)

Professional ratings
Review scores
Source	Rating
AllMusic	4/5 stars

Live in Oklahoma 1976 is a live album by the American Funk band Bootsy's Rubber Band. The album was released in 2001 and represents a collaborative effort between the Funk To The Max label, based in the Netherlands, and Bootzilla Records in the U.S.. The performance was recorded while Bootsy's Rubber Band was the support act (along with Sly and the Family Stone) for headliners Parliament-Funkadelic.

== Tracks ==
1. Intro 0:50
2. Psychoticbumpschool 9:52
3. Another Point Of View 4:28
4. I'd Rather Be With You 10:06
5. The Funk Jam 7:38
6. Vanish In Our Sleep 4:43
7. Stretchin' Out In Bootsy's Rubber Band 10:30

== Personnel ==
- Bootsy Collins – Bass
- Phelps Collins – Lead and Rhythm Guitar
- Frankie Kash Waddy – Drums
- Joel Johnson – Keyboards
- Fred Wesley, Maceo Parker, Rick Gardner, Richard Griffith – Horns
- Gary Cooper, Robert Johnson – Front ground vocals
