= Live in Louisville 1978 =

Live album by Bootsy's Rubber Band
- Released: 1999
- Recorded: March 15, 1978
- Genre: Funk
- Length: 68:05
- Label: Disky Communications
- Producer: Bootsy Collins

Bootsy's Rubber Band chronology
Fresh Outta 'P' University (1997)	Live in Louisville 1978 (1999)	Play With Bootsy (2002)

Professional ratings
Review scores
Source	Rating
AllMusic	4/5 stars

Live in Louisville 1978 is a live album by Bootsy's Rubber Band. The album was originally released in the Netherlands in 1999 on the Disky Communications label. The CD features a live recording of Bootsy's Rubber Band performing at the Kentucky Exposition Center in Louisville, Kentucky on March 15, 1978, during the "Player Of The Year" tour. To date "Live in Louisville 1978" has never been released outside the Netherlands.

== Tracks ==
1. Intro-Maceo – 0:23
2. Bootsy? (What's The Name Of This Town) – 3:15
3. Rubber Duckie – 0:56
4. Psychoticbumpschool – 3:17
5. Pinocchio Theory – 6:29
6. Hollywood Squares – 5:42
7. Roto-rooter – 3:27
8. Very Yes – 5:31
9. Can't Stay Away – 6:10
10. Stretchin' Out (In A Rubber Band) – 11:26
11. I'd Rather Be With You – 10:20
12. Aah The Name Is Bootsy, Baby – 4:27
13. Bootzilla – 6:22

Total album length is 68:05.

== Personnel ==
- Bootsy Collins – Space Bass, Lead vocals
- Phelps Collins – Rhythm guitar
- Frankie Kash Waddy – Drums
- Joel Johnson – Keyboards
- Maceo Parker, Richard Griffith, and Rick Gardner – Horns
- Gary Cooper, Robert Johnson – Front ground vocals
