= Rajamangala Stadium =

Stadium in Bangkok, Thailand

Rajamangala National Stadium
- ราชมังคลากีฬาสถาน
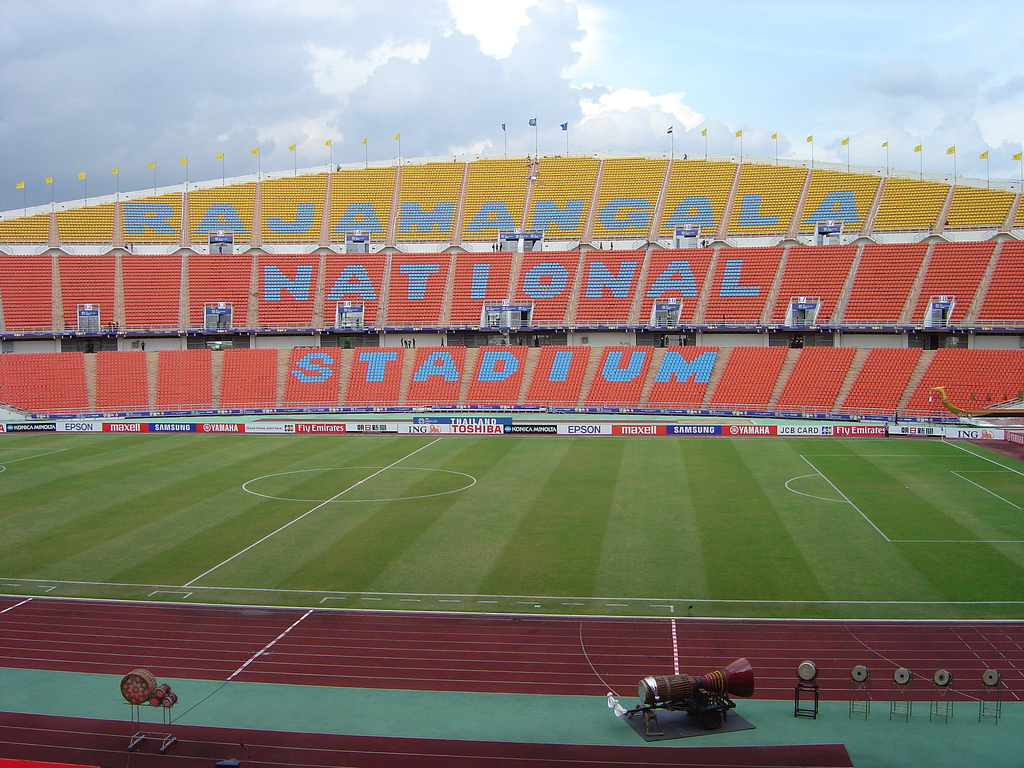
- Rajamangala National Stadium
- Interactive map of Rajamangala National Stadium
- Location: Hua Mak, Bang Kapi, Bangkok, Thailand
- Coordinates: 13°45′19″N 100°37′22″E
- Owner: Sports Authority of Thailand
- Operator: Sports Authority of Thailand
- Capacity: 51,560
- Surface: Grass
- Record attendance: 70,000 (Thailand vs Liverpool, 19 July 2001)
- Public transit: MRT SAT (from 2027)

Construction
- Built: 22 September 1988
- Opened: 6 December 1998
- Renovated: 2019, 2025
- Architects: Faculty of Architecture, Chulalongkorn University

Tenant
- Thailand national football team (1998–present)

The Rajamangala National Stadium (Thai: ราชมังคลากีฬาสถาน; RTGS: Ratchamangkhala Kila Sathan, pronounced [râːt.t͡ɕʰā.māŋ.kʰā.lāː kīː.lāː sā.tʰǎːn]) is the national stadium of Thailand national football team and the largest stadium and sports venue by capacity in the country. It is part of the Hua Mak Sports Complex, and is located in Hua Mak Subdistrict, Bang Kapi, Bangkok. Its official opening on 6 December 1998 coincided with the beginning of the 1998 Asian Games.

Rajamangala National Stadium serves as Thailand's primary venue for football matches, concerts, and major sporting events, including those of the Thailand national team and AFF Championship games. The National Stadium hosted the opening and closing ceremonies of the 2025 SEA Games. Previous concerts held at the Rajamangala National Stadium includes Blackpink, BTS, Coldplay and other prominent international artistes.

Hua Mak serves as the main hub for sports and recreation in Bangkok, primarily anchored by the expansive Hua Mak Sports Complex managed by the Sports Authority of Thailand. Rajamangala National Stadium is part of the wider Hua Mak Sporting Complex.

Ramkhamhaeng Night Market

Directly just outside Rajamangala National Stadium is the Ramkhamhaeng Night Market. Held everyday except for Wednesdays, the bustling market attracts locals all over Bangkok.

== Overview ==
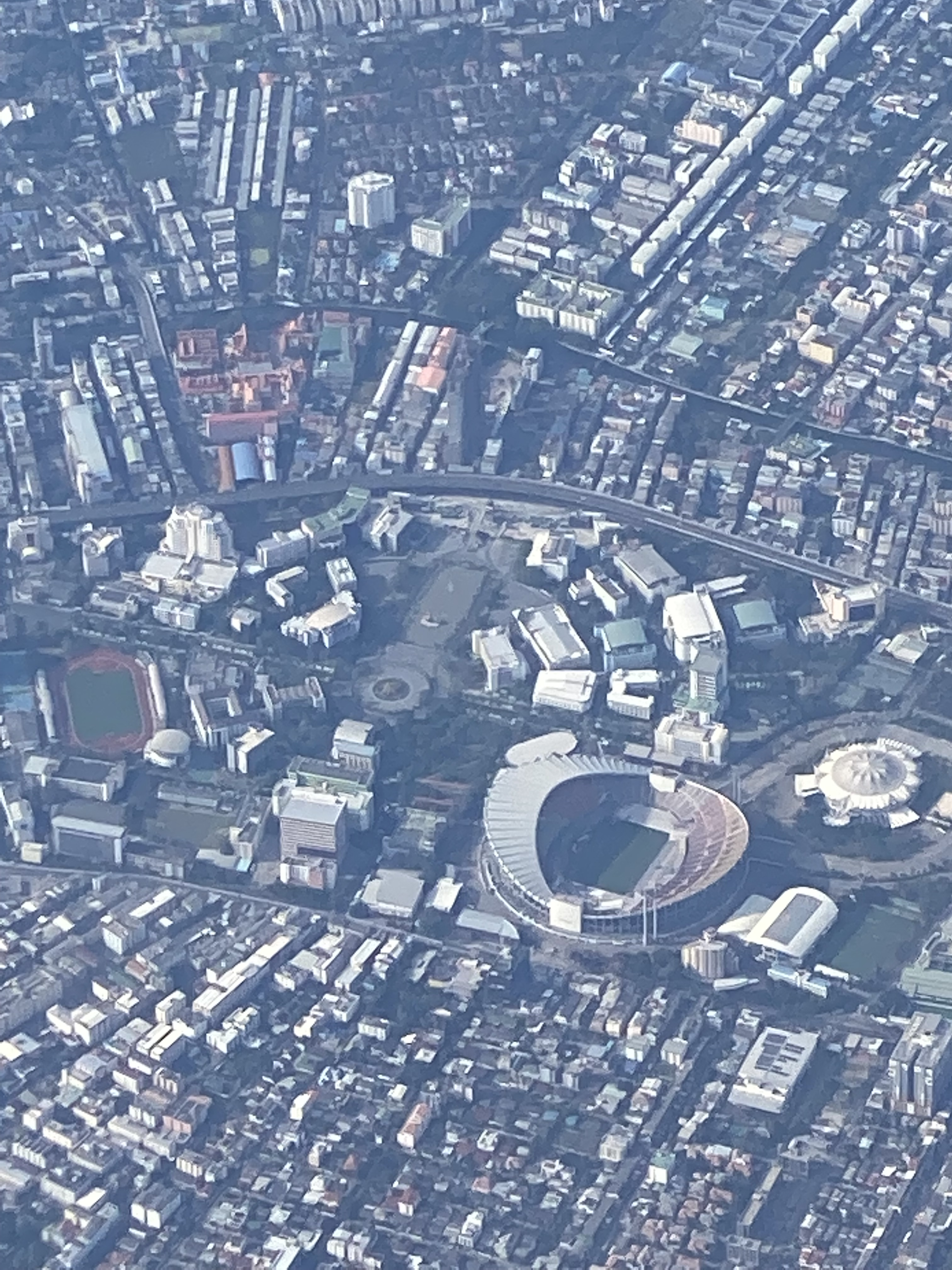
Aerial view of Hua Mak Sports Complex, included Rajamangala Stadium and Indoor Stadium Huamark (2022)

The stadium was first used for the 1998 Asian Games in 1998 and 1999 ASEAN University Games. Also was the main venue for the 2007 Summer Universiade when hosted the football finals and the opening and closing ceremonies and will be the main venue for the 2025 SEA Games when hosting men's football and the ceremonies. Since then, it has been used for many international matches and football tournaments. Most notably, for the 2007 AFC Asian Cup. Thai club sides have also used the stadium when playing in continental cup competitions. Krung Thai Bank FC (now BG Pathum United) used it for AFC Champions League matches, and PEA FC and Chonburi FC have recently used it in the AFC Cup. Aside from football, it has been used for athletics, pop concerts, and political rallies. In addition, Rajamangala Stadium was built to honor King Bhumibol Adulyadej on the occasion of His Majesty the King's 5th Cycle Birthday Anniversary, 5 December 1987, and the Rajamangala Celebrations (The Celebrations of the longest reigning Thai monarch) for King Bhumibol Adulyadej, 2nd July 1988.

The capacity of the stadium is 65,000. When the stadium first opened, its capacity was 80,000. But plastic seats were installed on the North, South, and East stands, where previously there had been bare concrete steps, in preprepation for the 2007 AFC Asian Cup.

On 16 September 2019, Sports Authority of Thailand has been closed for renovation to be used as one of the stadiums for 2020 AFC U-23 Championship, which Thailand hosted in January 2020 to select 3 teams to compete in the 2020 Summer Olympics in Tokyo, Japan.

On 12 July 2022, Rajamangala Stadium held the world-class football match for teams in the Premier League named "The MATCH Final Bangkok Century Cup 2022" between Manchester United vs. Liverpool, with improvements of the field and stadium to support the competition.

== Hua Mak Sporting Complex ==
The Hua Mak Sporting Complex contains 4 Stadiums, 3 Gyms, 1 Olympic Pool, 1 Skate Park, 1 Shooting Range, 6 Tennis Courts, Soccer Fields and 1 Climbing Range. In total, the Hua Mak Sporting Complex has specialized facilities for over 20 different sports.

The Hua Mak Sports Complex plays host to the Sports Authority of Thailand governing body and 28 of 37 sports associations of Thailand. The sports associations are under the National Olympic Committee of Thailand and under the Thai Royal Patronage. It is also the headquarters for Southeast Asia's largest biannual sporting games, the SEA Games which typically attracts millions of attendees and viewers all over Southeast Asia across 2 weeks.

== Recent Developments ==
In 2024, the Sports Authority of Thailand (SAT) announced a THB 5-billion (US$150 million) makeover budget for the Rajamangala National Stadium. Improvements include upgrading the security system, smart facilities and sound system within the arena.

The makeover was completed before the opening ceremony of the 2025 SEA Games and transformed Rajamangala National Stadium into a Smart Stadium with upgraded sound system to deliver sound to every seat. This is in line with the vision of transforming Rajamangala National Stadium into a world-class sports and concert venue.

The area has recently been going through a renaissance in its retail scene with 3 recent major mall renovation in its area such as The Mall Lifestore Bangkapi (2022 - 20 billion THB), Huamark Center (2023 - 300 million THB) and The Mall Ramkhamhaeng (2026 - 1.3 billion THB).

Rajamangala Stadium's surrounding amenities are well supported by 3 major shopping malls (named above) and 3 major night/community markets in its vicinity.

== Transportation ==
=== MRT Orange Line ===
Bangkok Metro Map (Orange Line)

Connectivity to Rajamangala National Stadium is set to further improve with the addition of the MRT Orange Line in late-2027. The line would interchange with MRT Blue Line at Thailand Cultural Center station and MRT Yellow Line at Yaek Lam Sali station, further boosting the area's connectivity to many other destinations within Bangkok. Rajamangala's Orange Line Station is known as the SAT Station.

Khlong Saen Saep Express Boat Route

=== Khlong Saen Saep Boat Service ===
Rajamangala National Stadium can be reached via the Khlong Saen Saep Boat Service. The closest pier station would be Ramkhamhaeng University (RU) Pier. Connects to key destinations such as The Mall Bangkapi, Ramkhamhaeng Airport Rail Link (ARL) Station, Khlong Tan ARL Station, Asoke ARL Station, Phetchaburi MRT Station, Chit Lom, Nana and Centralw0rld Shopping Mall.

=== Airport Rail Link (ARL) ===
Commuters are also able to drop off at Hua Mak ARL Station or Sukhumvit 71 Station of the Airport Rail Link. From either stations, Rajamangala National Stadium can be reached within 5-10 minutes via motorbike or car.

=== Public Buses ===
Rajamangala National Stadium is well serviced by numerous bus lines connecting the stadium to the city center or Suvarnabhumi Airport. Multiple public bus routes pass the stadium, including lines 22, 60, 71, 92, 93, 99, 109, 115, 207, 501, and 545.

== Performances ==
Upcoming Performances:

- LOSO 30 Years 'Waiting No Matter How Long' - 21 November 2026
- BTS World Tour 'Arirang' in Bangkok - 3, 5, 6 December 2026
- Bodyslam Fest "Rak Kreung Neung Od Thon Kreung Neung" Live in Rajamangala Stadium - 13, 14 February 2027
- Bruno Mars The Romantic Tour - 24, 25 February 2027

Past Performances:

- Carabao 15 Year Celebrate-Made in Thailand Concert – 25 December 1999
- B Day Concert – 10 December 2004
- Bangkok Music Festival – 7 May 2005
- Asanee-Wasan Rumrai Concert – 17 November 2007
- YAMAHA Presents SMTOWN Live’08 in Bangkok – 7 February 2009
- Show King M Bangkok – 6 April 2010
- Soda Chang Presents Bodyslam Live In Kraam By Air Asia – 27 November 2010
- Korean Music Wave in Bangkok presented by JL Starnet – 12 March 2011
- Bangkok Summer Festival By Coca-Cola – 7, 8 May 2011
- MBC Korean Music Wave in Bangkok 2012 – 7 April 2012
- Lady Gaga Born This Way Ball Tour – 25 May 2012
- M! Countdown Smile-Thailand – 11 October 2012
- Race of Champions - 14, 16 December 2012
- The Voice Thailand True Sound Real Sound – 2 March 2013
- One Direction On the Road Again Tour – 14 March 2015
- Coldplay A Head Full of Dreams Tour – 7 April 2017
- Bodyslam Fest Wichatuabao Live in Rajamangala Stadium Concert – 9, 10 February 2019
- BTS Love Yourself World Tour – 6, 7 April 2019
- Ed Sheeran ÷ Tour – 28 April 2019
- Justin Bieber Justice World Tour – 6 November 2022 (Cancelled)
- Maroon 5 World Tour 2022 – 10 December 2022
- 37th Golden Disc Awards – 7 January 2023
- Harry Styles Love On Tour – 11 March 2023
- BLACKPINK Born Pink World Tour – 27, 28 May 2023
- SEVENTEEN Follow Tour – 23, 24 December 2023
- Jay Chou Carnival World Tour – 9 December 2023
- Coldplay Music of the Spheres World Tour – 3, 4 February 2024
- Ed Sheeran +–=÷× Tour - 10 February 2024
- Bruno Mars Bruno Mars Live - 30, 31 March 2024
- BamBam Area 52 The 1st World Tour Encore – 4 May 2024
- NCT DREAM The Dream Show 3: Dream( )scape – 22, 23 June 2024
- Seventeen Right Here World Tour – 15, 16 February 2025
- S2O Songkran Music Festival - 12, 13, 14 April 2025
- GOT7 NESTFEST 2025 GOT7 Concert in Bangkok – 2, 3 May 2025
- Enhypen Walk The Line Tour – 21 June 2025
- NCT Dream The Dream Show 4: Dream the Future – 16, 17 August 2025
- Blackpink Deadline World Tour – 24, 25, 26 October 2025
- Neon Countdown 2025 - 31 December 2025
- The Weeknd After Hours Til Dawn Tour- 11, 12, 13 October 2026
- BigBang World Tour in Bangkok - 7 November 2026

== Gallery ==
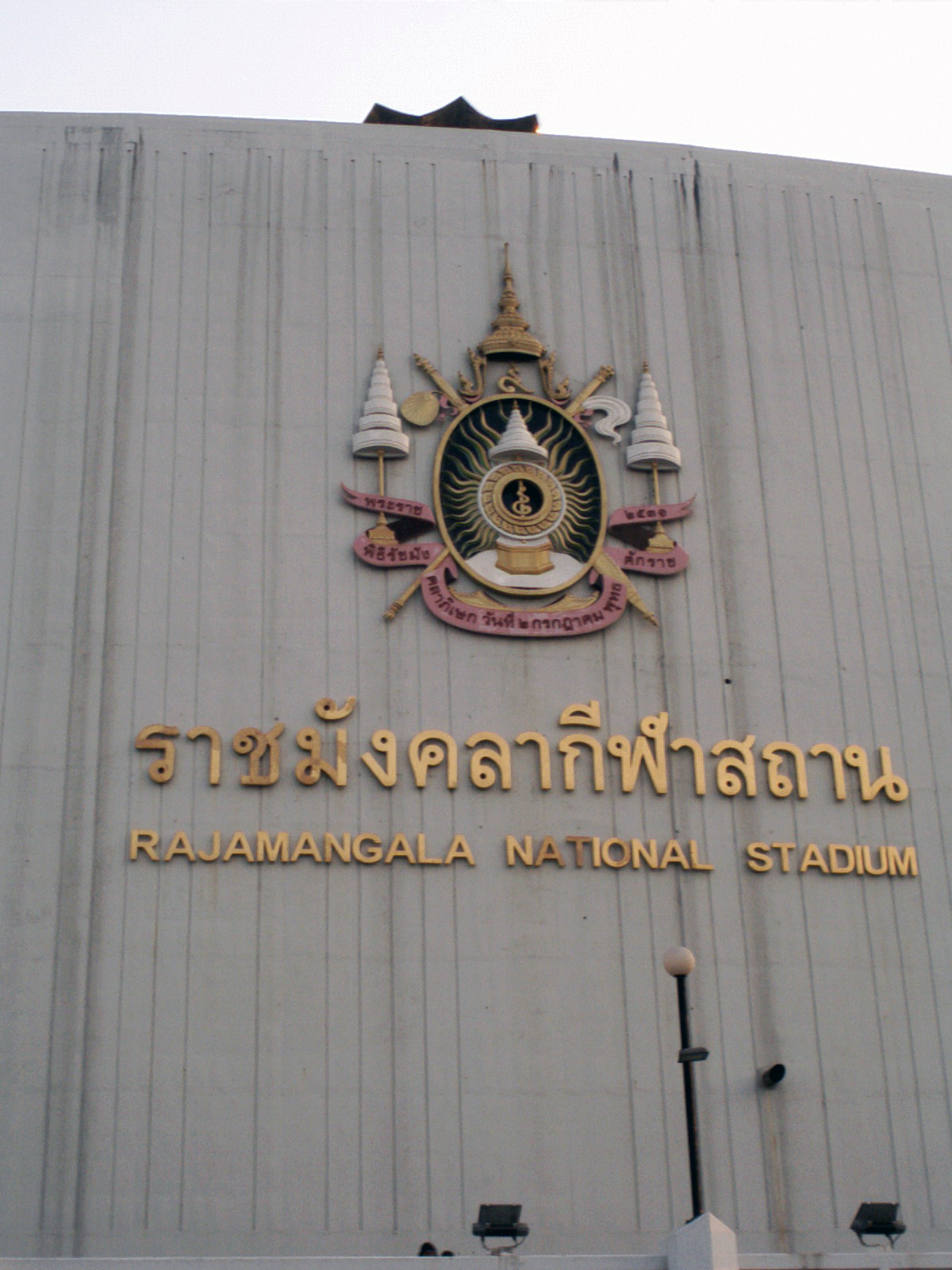

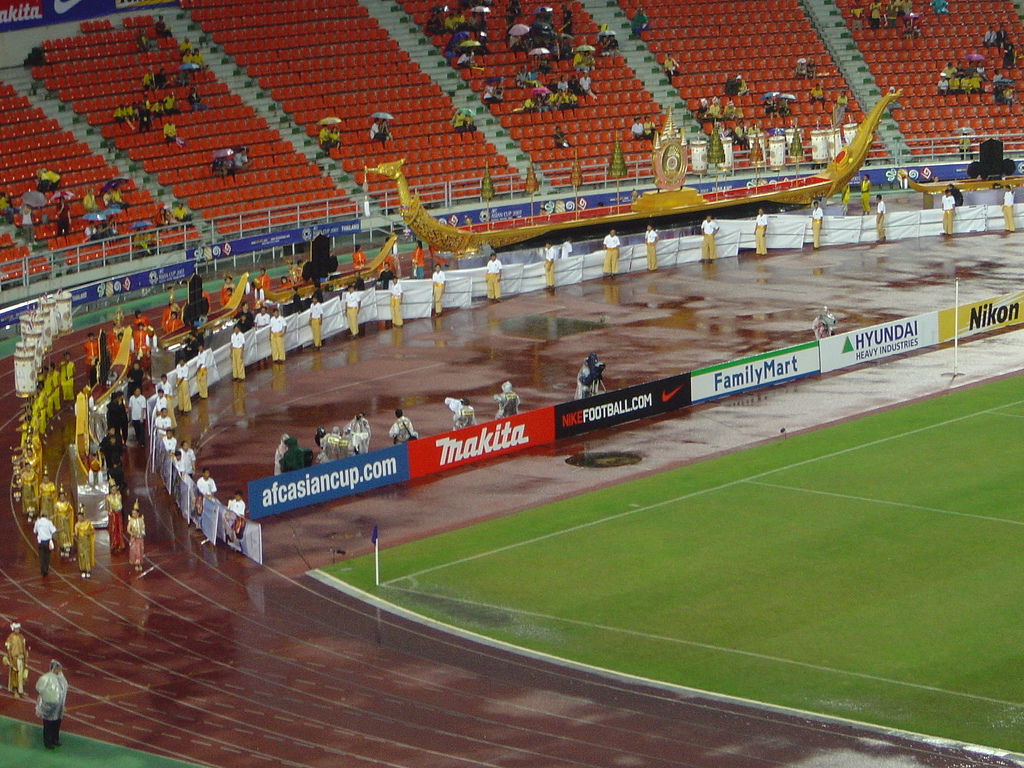

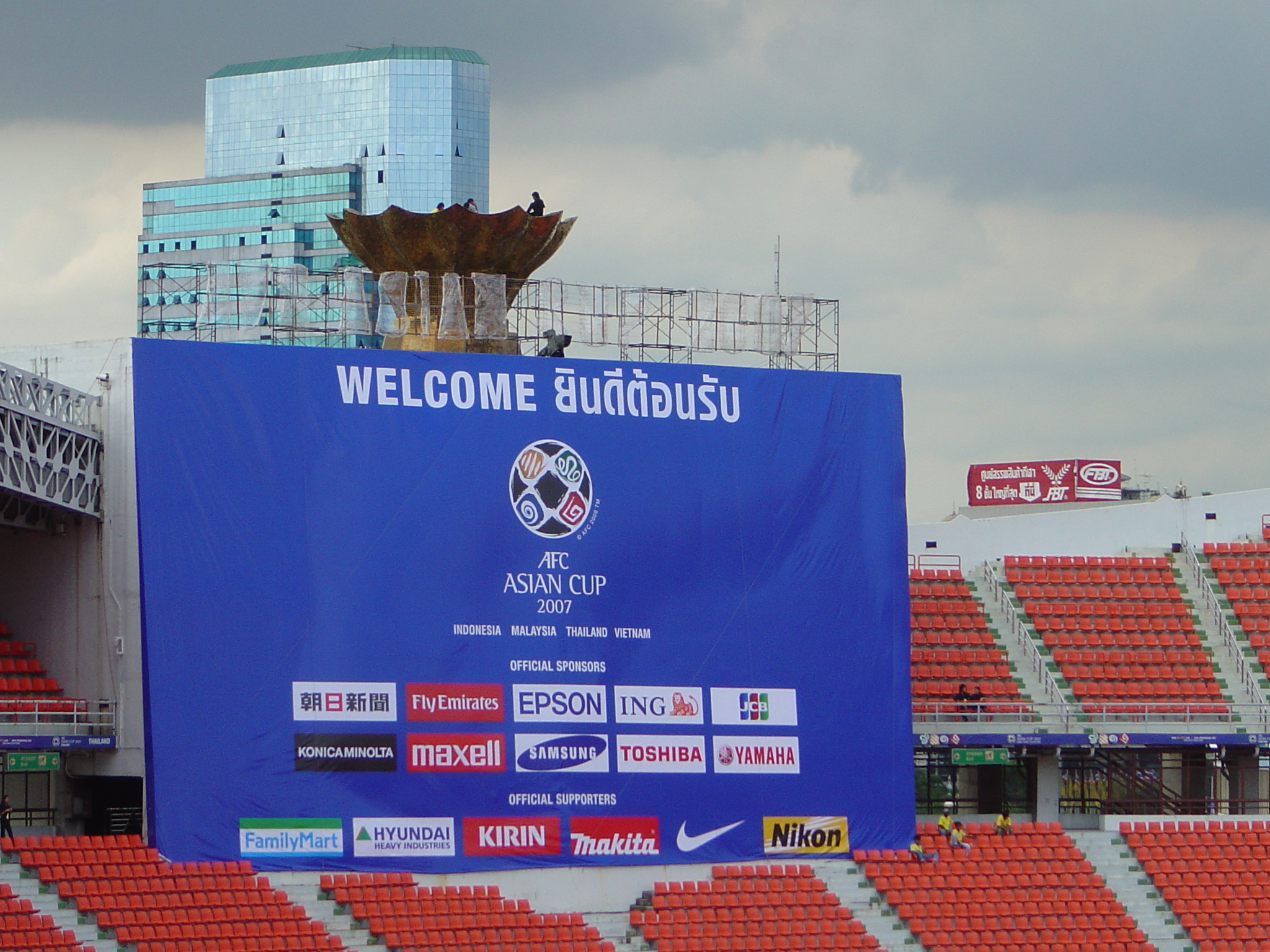

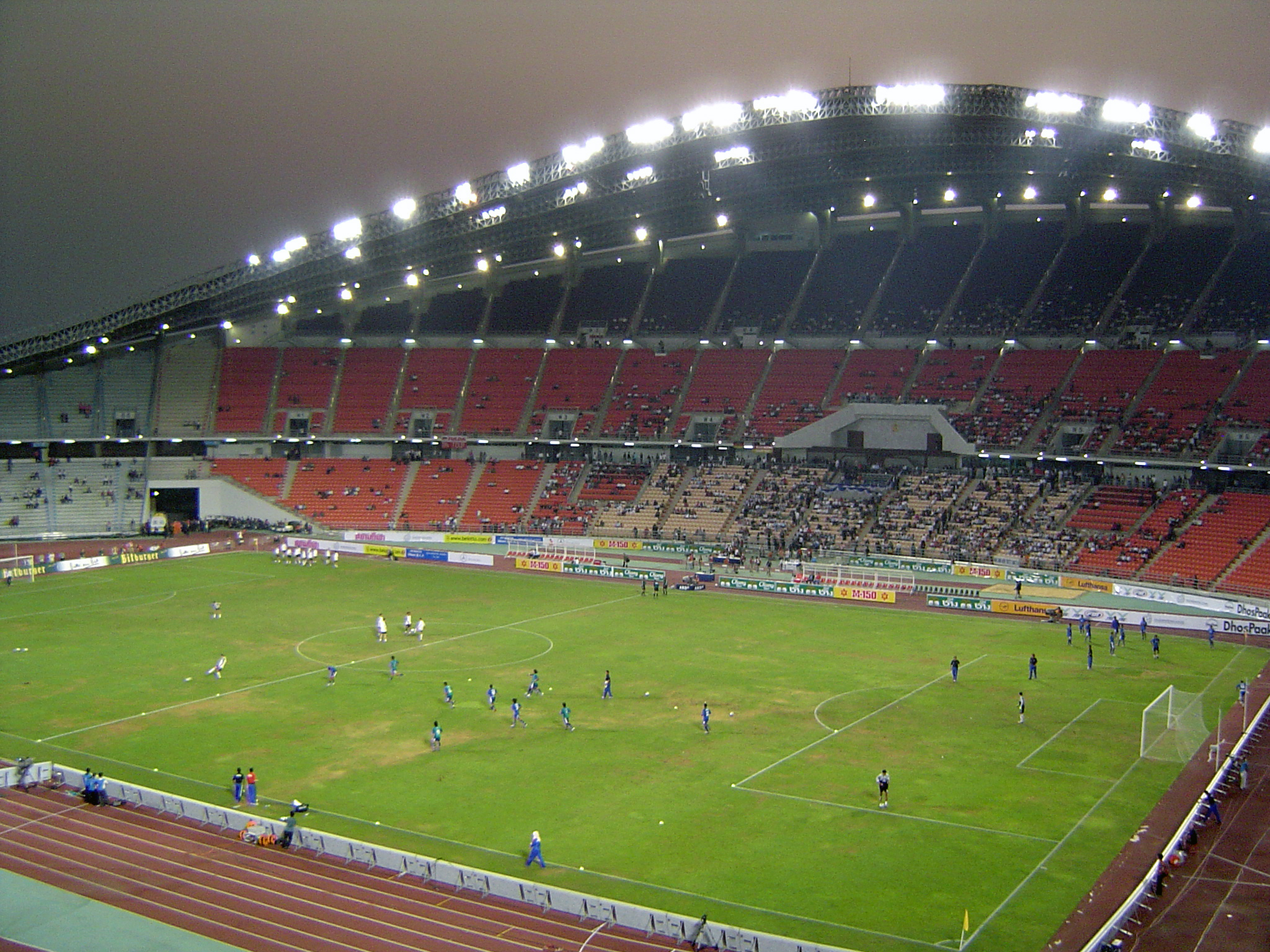

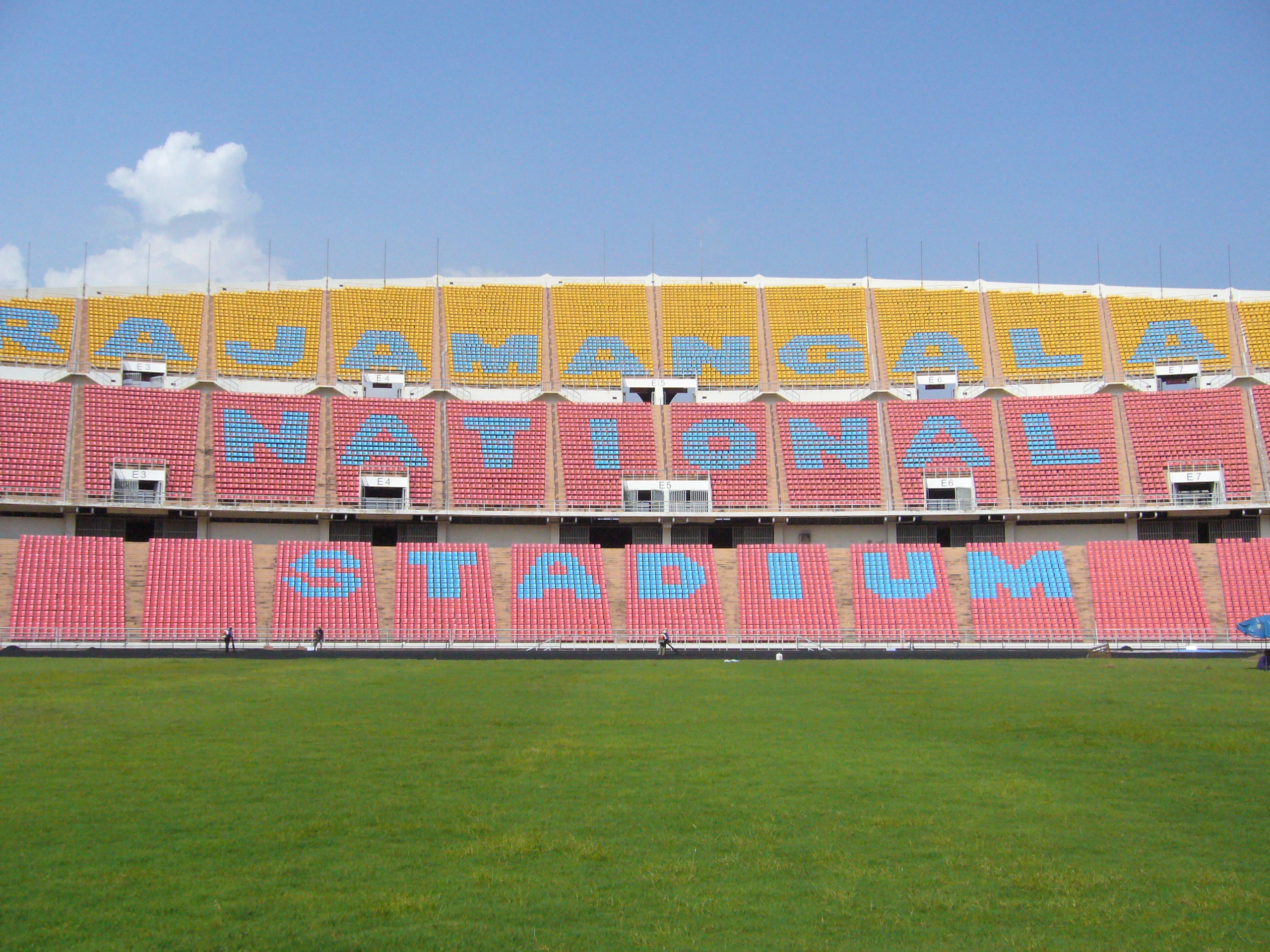

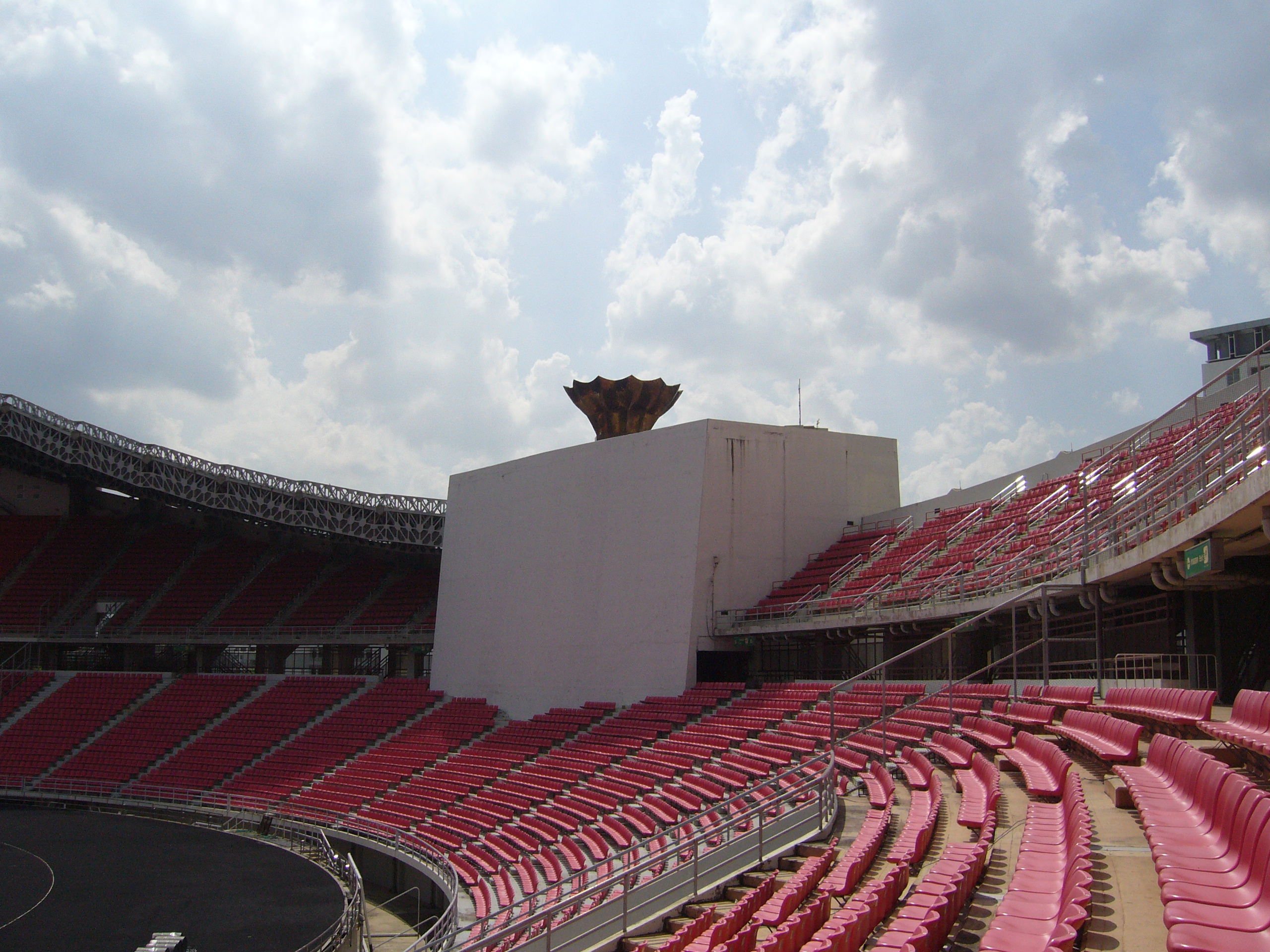

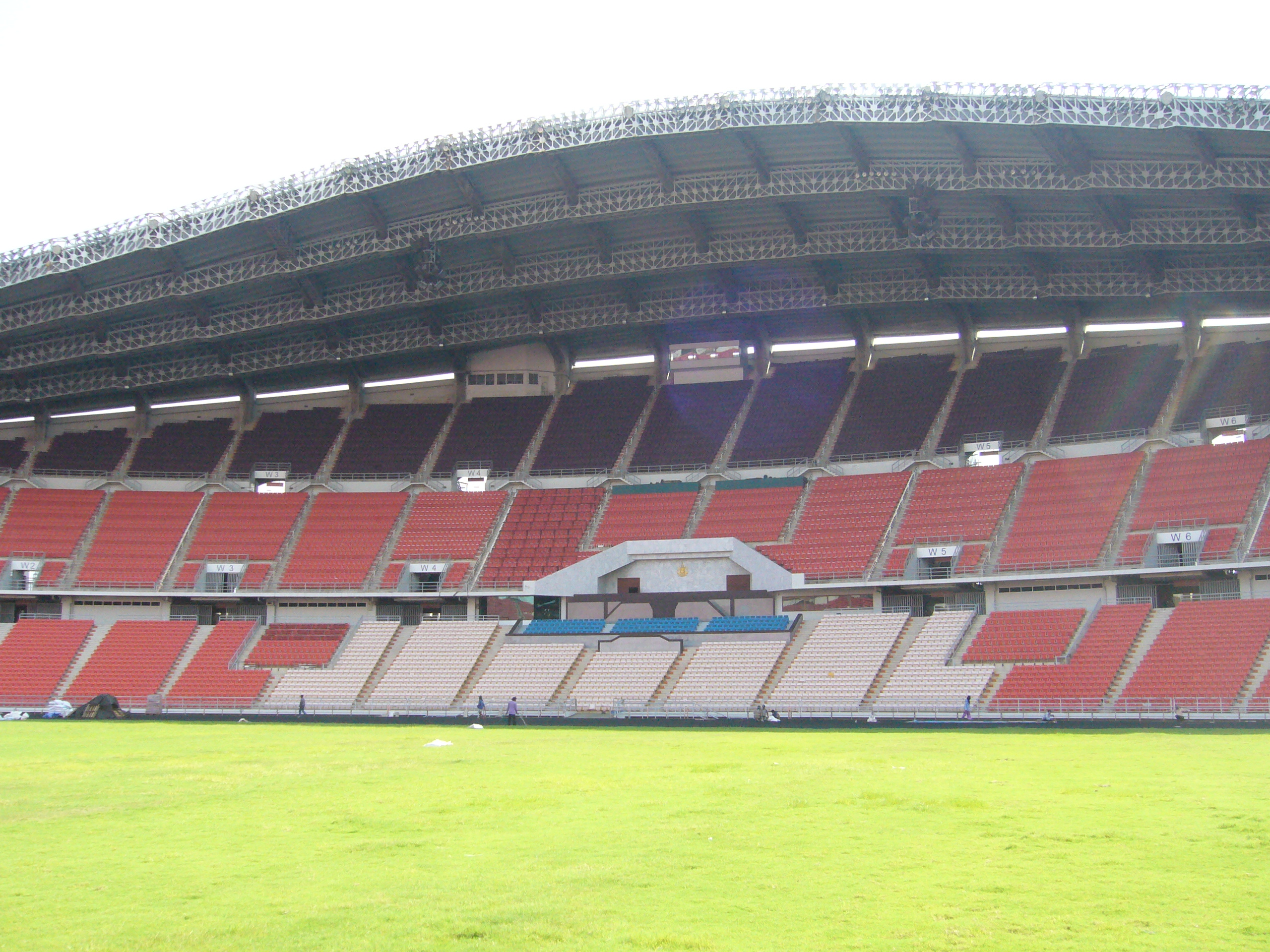

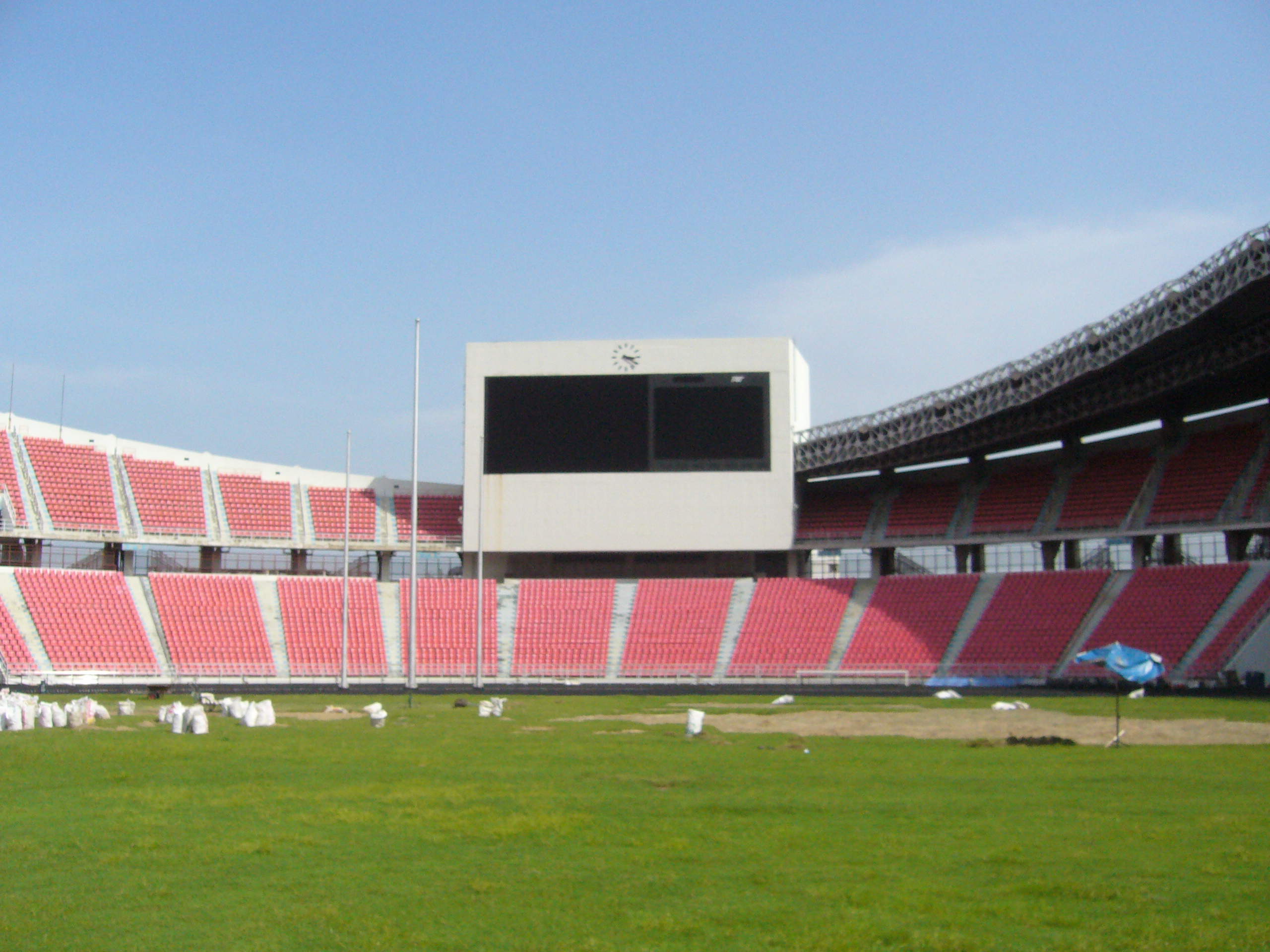

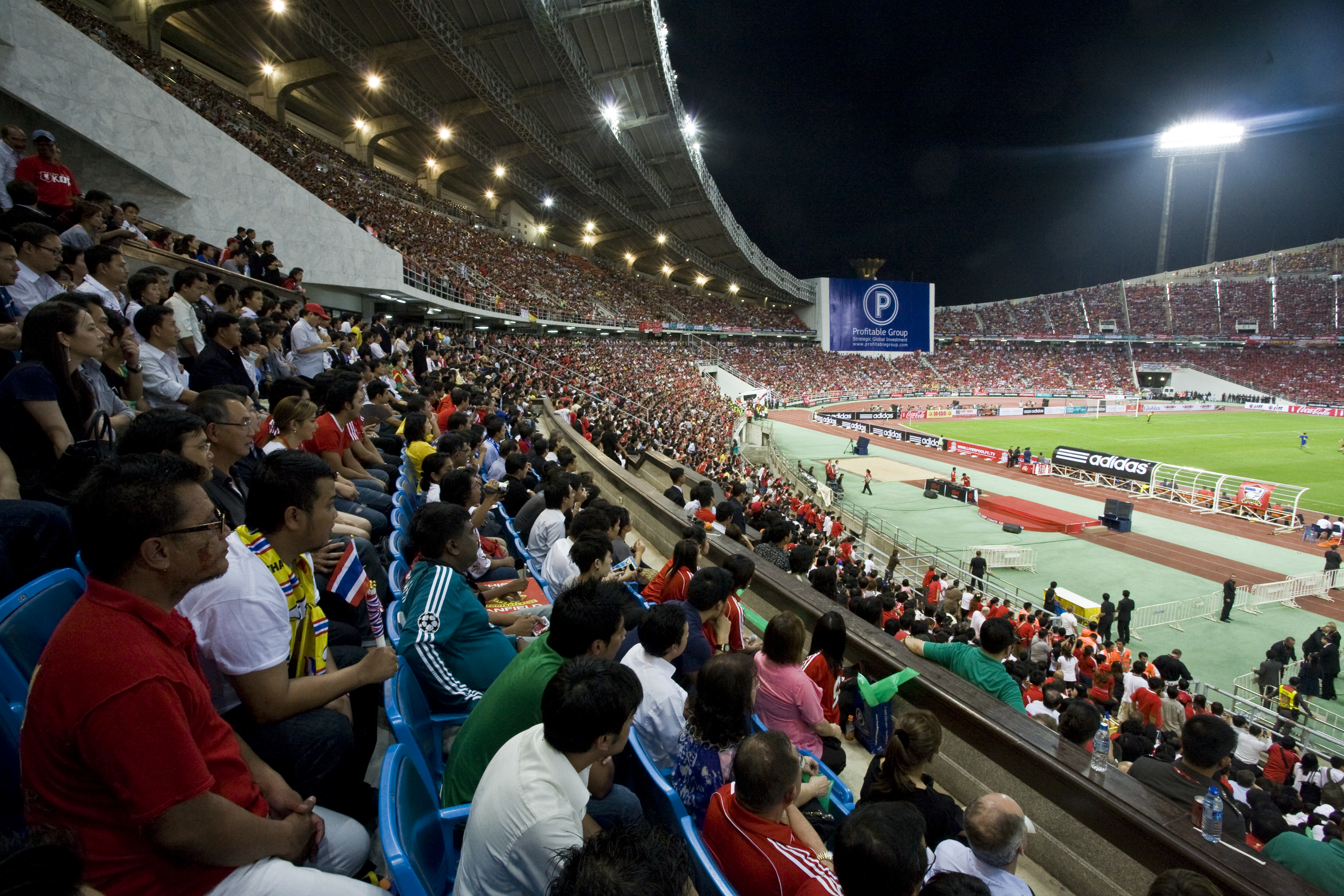

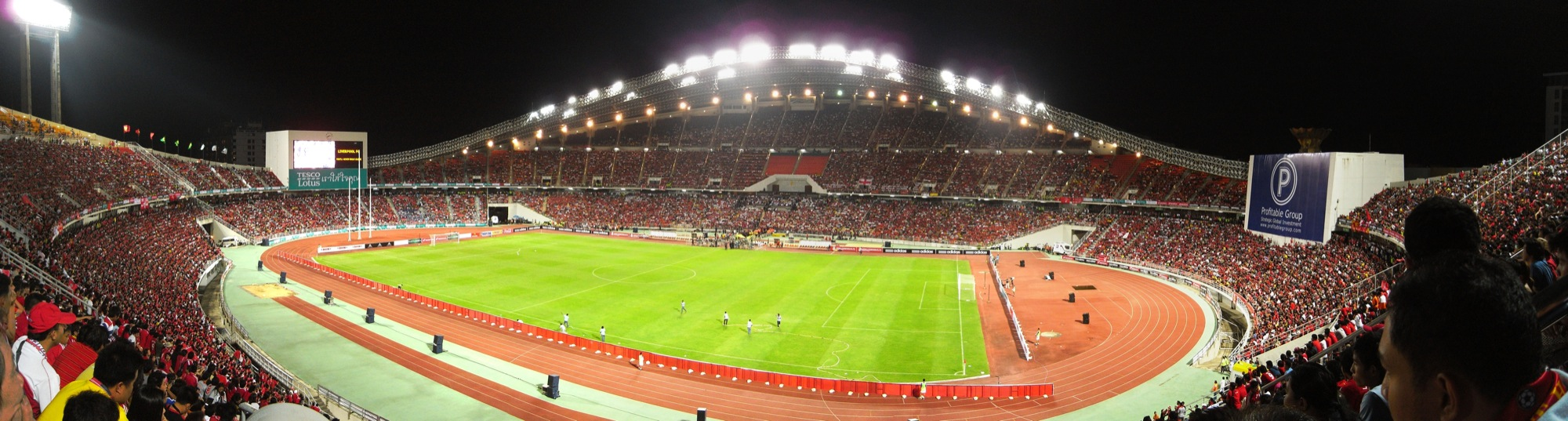

== Tournament results ==
The stadium has hosted several international FIFA matches. Here is a list of the most important international matches held at the Rajamangala Stadium.

=== 1998 Asian Games ===
Date	Time (UTC+07)	Team #1	Res.	Team #2	Round
7 December 1998	15:00	Japan	0–2	South Korea	Second round (Group 2)
7 December 1998	17:00	United Arab Emirates	0–5	Kuwait	Second round (Group 2)
8 December 1998	15:00	Qatar	1–0	Lebanon	Second round (Group 4)
8 December 1998	17:00	Thailand	1–1	Kazakhstan	Second round (Group 4)
9 December 1998	15:00	United Arab Emirates	1–2	South Korea	Second round (Group 2)
9 December 1998	17:00	Japan	2–1	Kuwait	Second round (Group 2)
10 December 1998	15:00	Qatar	0–2	Kazakhstan	Second round (Group 4)
10 December 1998	17:00	Thailand	1–0	Lebanon	Second round (Group 4)
11 December 1998	15:00	Japan	0–1	United Arab Emirates	Second round (Group 2)
11 December 1998	17:00	South Korea	1–0	Kuwait	Second round (Group 2)
12 December 1998	15:00	Kazakhstan	0–3	Lebanon	Second round (Group 4)
10 December 1998	17:00	Thailand	1–2	Qatar	Second round (Group 4)
14 December 1998	14:00	Thailand	2–1 (a.e.t.)	South Korea	Quarter-finals
14 December 1998	17:00	Qatar	0–0 (a.e.t.) (1–3 pen.)	Kuwait	Quarter-finals
16 December 1998	14:00	Iran	1–0	China	Semi-finals
16 December 1998	17:00	Thailand	0–3	Kuwait	Semi-finals
19 December 1998	17:00	Iran	2–0	Kuwait	Gold medal match

=== 2000 AFF Championship ===
Date	Time (UTC+07)	Team #1	Res.	Team #2	Round	Attendance
16 November 2000	16:00	Vietnam	2–3 (a.e.t)	Indonesia	Semi-finals	N/A
16 November 2000	19:00	Thailand	2–0	Malaysia	Semi-finals	N/A
18 November 2000	16:00	Vietnam	0–3	Malaysia	Third place play-off	N/A
18 November 2000	19:00	Thailand	4–1	Indonesia	Final	N/A

=== 2007 AFC Asian Cup ===
Date	Time (UTC+07)	Team #1	Res.	Team #2	Round	Attendance
7 July 2007	19:30	Thailand	1–1	Iraq	Group A	30,000
8 July 2007	17:15	Australia	1–1	Oman	Group A	5,000
12 July 2007	17:15	Thailand	2–0	Oman	Group A	19,000
13 July 2007	17:15	Iraq	3–1	Australia	Group A	6,000
16 July 2007	19:30	Thailand	0–4	Australia	Group A	46,000
21 July 2007	20:15	Iraq	2–0	Vietnam	Quarter-finals	9,790

=== 2008 AFF Championship ===
Date	Time (UTC+07)	Team #1	Res.	Team #2	Round	Attendance
20 December 2008	19:00	Thailand	2–1	Indonesia	Semifinals second leg	40,000
24 December 2008	19:00	Thailand	1–2	Vietnam	Finals first leg	50,000

=== 2012 AFF Championship ===
Date	Time (UTC+07)	Team #1	Res.	Team #2	Round	Attendance
24 November 2012	17:30	Vietnam	1–1	Myanmar	Group Stage	N/A
24 November 2012	20:20	Thailand	2–1	Philippines	Group Stage	N/A
27 November 2012	17:30	Vietnam	0–1	Philippines	Group Stage	N/A
27 November 2012	20:20	Myanmar	0–4	Thailand	Group Stage	N/A
30 November 2012	20:20	Thailand	3–1	Vietnam	Group Stage	N/A

=== 2014 AFF Championship ===
Date	Time (UTC+07)	Team #1	Res.	Team #2	Round	Attendance
10 December 2014	19:00	Thailand	3–0	Philippines	Semifinals second leg	N/A
17 December 2014	19:00	Thailand	2–0	Malaysia	Finals first leg	N/A

=== 2016 AFF Championship ===
Date	Time (UTC+07)	Team #1	Res.	Team #2	Round	Attendance
8 December 2016	19:00	Thailand	4–0	Myanmar	Semifinals second leg	43,638
17 December 2016	19:00	Thailand	2–0	Indonesia	Finals second leg	48,000

=== 2018 AFF Championship ===
Date	Time (UTC+07)	Team #1	Res.	Team #2	Round	Attendance
9 November 2018	19:00	Timor-Leste	0–7	Thailand	Group Stage	8,764
17 November 2018	18:30	Thailand	4–2	Indonesia	Group Stage	37,570
25 November 2018	19:00	Thailand	3–0	Singapore	Group Stage	29,673
5 December 2018	19:00	Thailand	2–2	Malaysia	Semifinals second leg	46,157

=== 2020 AFC U-23 Championship ===
Date	Time (UTC+07)	Team #1	Res.	Team #2	Round	Attendance
8 January 2020	20:15	Thailand	5–0	Bahrain	Group Stage	7,076
11 January 2020	20:15	Australia	2–1	Thailand	Group Stage	22,352
14 January 2020	20:15	Thailand	1–1	Iraq	Group Stage	15,342
15 January 2020	20:15	Qatar	1–1	Japan	Group Stage	1,362
16 January 2020	20:15	Vietnam	1–2	North Korea	Group Stage	1,932
18 January 2020	20:15	Australia	1–0 (a.e.t.)	Syria	Quarter-finals	214
19 January 2020	20:15	United Arab Emirates	1–5	Uzbekistan	Quarter-finals	244
22 January 2020	17:15	Saudi Arabia	1–0	Uzbekistan	Semi-Finals	329
25 January 2020	19:30	Australia	1–0	Uzbekistan	Third place play-off	590
26 January 2020	19:30	South Korea	1–0	Saudi Arabia	Final	2,879

=== 2023 AFC U-17 Asian Cup ===
Date	Time (UTC+07)	Team #1	Res.	Team #2	Round	Attendance
16 June 2023	21:00	Iran	6–1	Afghanistan	Group Stage	73
17 June 2023	17:00	Japan	1–1	Uzbekistan	Group Stage	421
19 June 2023	21:00	Qatar	0–0	Iran	Group Stage	83
20 June 2023	17:00	Vietnam	0–4	Japan	Group Stage	294
22 June 2023	17:00	Tajikistan	0–2	Australia	Group Stage	128
22 June 2023	21:00	Afghanistan	2–1	Qatar	Group Stage	78
23 June 2023	19:00	Japan	8–4	India	Group Stage	274

=== 2026 FIFA World Cup qualification – AFC second round ===
Date	Time (UTC+07)	Team #1	Res.	Team #2	Round	Attendance
16 November 2023	19:30	Thailand	1–2	China	Group Stage	35,009
26 March 2024	19:30	Thailand	0–3	South Korea	Group Stage	45,458
11 June 2024	19:30	Thailand	3–1	Singapore	Group Stage	39,404

=== 2024 ASEAN Championship ===
Date	Time (UTC+07)	Team #1	Res.	Team #2	Round	Attendance
14 December 2024	20:00	Thailand	1–0	Malaysia	Group Stage	25,619
20 December 2024	20:00	Thailand	3–2	Cambodia	Group Stage	15,621
30 December 2024	20:00	Thailand	3–1	Philippines	Semifinals second leg	31,876
5 January 2025	20:00	Thailand	2–3	Vietnam	Final second leg	46,982

=== 2025 SEA Games ===
Date	Time (UTC+07)	Team #1	Res.	Team #2	Round	Attendance
3 December 2025	16:00	Laos	1–2	Vietnam	Group Stage	N/A
3 December 2025	19:00	Timor-Leste	1–6	Thailand	Group Stage	7,741
6 December 2025	16:00	Malaysia	4–1	Laos	Group Stage	N/A
6 December 2025	19:00	Singapore	1–3	Timor-Leste	Group Stage	N/A
11 December 2025	16:00	Vietnam	2–0	Malaysia	Group Stage	N/A
11 December 2025	19:00	Thailand	3–0	Singapore	Group Stage	7,896
11 December 2025	16:00	Vietnam	2–0	Malaysia	Group Stage	N/A
11 December 2025	19:00	Thailand	3–0	Singapore	Group Stage	7,896
15 December 2025	15:30	Vietnam	2–0	Philippines	Semi-Finals	N/A
15 December 2025	20:00	Thailand	1–0	Malaysia	Semi-Finals	19,659
18 December 2025	15:30	Philippines	1–2	Malaysia	Bronze medal match	1,325
18 December 2025	19:30	Thailand	2–3 (a.e.t.)	Vietnam	Gold medal match	17,736

=== 2026 ASEAN Championship ===
Date	Time (UTC+07)	Team #1	Res.	Team #2	Round	Attendance
4 August 2026	20:00	Thailand	2–0	Malaysia	Group Stage	16,037
8 August 2026	20:00	Thailand	2–0	Myanmar	Group Stage	13,026
18 August 2026	20:00	Thailand	1–2 (4–3)	Singapore	Semifinals second leg	10,802
22 August 2026	20:00	Thailand	0–2	Vietnam	Final first leg	26,415

== See also ==
- Suphachalasai Stadium

Events and tenants
Preceded by Edion Stadium Hiroshima (Japan) Hiroshima	Asian Games; Opening and Closing Ceremonies; 1998	Succeeded by Busan Asiad Main Stadium (South Korea) Busan
Preceded by Yunlin County Stadium (Taiwan) Dounan	AFC Women's Asian Championship; Final Venue; 2003	Succeeded by Hindmarsh Stadium (Australia) Adelaide
Preceded by Azadi Stadium (Iran) Tehran	AFC Champions League; Final Venue; 2003	Succeeded by Prince Abdullah Al Faisal Stadium (Saudi Arabia) Jeddah
Preceded by Commonwealth Stadium (Canada) Edmonton	FIFA U-19 Women's World Championship; Final Venue; 2004	Succeeded by Lokomotiv Stadium (Russia) Moscow
Preceded by Bukit Jalil National Stadium (Malaysia) Kuala Lumpur	Premier League Asia Trophy; Venue; 2007	Succeeded by Hong Kong Stadium; Hong Kong
Preceded by İzmir Atatürk Stadium (Turkey) İzmir	Summer Universiade; Opening and Closing Ceremonies; 2007	Succeeded by Belgrade Arena (Serbia) Belgrade
Preceded by Esprit Arena (Germany) Düsseldorf	Race of Champions; Host stadium 2012	Succeeded by Bushy Park Circuit (Barbados) 2014
