= List of Billboard number-one R&B albums of 1978 =

These are the Billboard magazine R&B albums that reached number-one in 1978.

== Chart history ==
Issue date	Album	Artist
January 7	All 'N All	Earth, Wind and Fire
January 14	All 'N All	Earth, Wind and Fire
January 21	All 'N All	Earth, Wind and Fire
January 28	All 'N All	Earth, Wind and Fire
February 4	All 'N All	Earth, Wind and Fire
February 11	All 'N All	Earth, Wind and Fire
February 18	Saturday Night Fever	Soundtrack / Bee Gees
February 25	Saturday Night Fever	Soundtrack / Bee Gees
March 4	Saturday Night Fever	Soundtrack / Bee Gees
March 11	Saturday Night Fever	Soundtrack / Bee Gees
March 18	Saturday Night Fever	Soundtrack / Bee Gees
March 25	Bootsy? Player of the Year	Bootsy's Rubber Band
April 1	Bootsy? Player of the Year	Bootsy's Rubber Band
April 8	Bootsy? Player of the Year	Bootsy's Rubber Band
April 15	Street Player	Rufus featuring Chaka Khan
April 22	Bootsy? Player of the Year	Bootsy's Rubber Band
April 29	Weekend in L.A.	George Benson
May 6	Weekend in L.A.	George Benson
May 13	Showdown	The Isley Brothers
May 20	Showdown	The Isley Brothers
May 27	Showdown	The Isley Brothers
June 3	So Full Of Love	The O'Jays
June 10	So Full Of Love	The O'Jays
June 17	So Full Of Love	The O'Jays
June 24	Natural High	The Commodores
July 1	Natural High	The Commodores
July 8	Natural High	The Commodores
July 15	Natural High	The Commodores
July 22	Natural High	The Commodores
July 29	Natural High	The Commodores
August 5	Natural High	The Commodores
August 12	Life Is a Song Worth Singing	Teddy Pendergrass
August 19	Life Is a Song Worth Singing	Teddy Pendergrass
August 26	Natural High	The Commodores
September 2	Blam!	The Brothers Johnson
September 9	Blam!	The Brothers Johnson
September 16	Blam!	The Brothers Johnson
September 23	Blam!	The Brothers Johnson
September 30	Blam!	The Brothers Johnson
October 7	Blam!	The Brothers Johnson
October 14	Blam!	The Brothers Johnson
October 21	Is It Still Good to Ya	Ashford & Simpson
October 28	One Nation Under a Groove	Funkadelic
November 4	One Nation Under a Groove	Funkadelic
November 11	One Nation Under a Groove	Funkadelic
November 18	One Nation Under a Groove	Funkadelic
November 25	The Man	Barry White
December 2	The Man	Barry White
December 9	The Man	Barry White
December 16	C'est Chic	Chic
December 23	C'est Chic	Chic
December 30	C'est Chic	Chic

== See also ==
- 1978 in music
- R&B number-one hits of 1978 (USA)
