= Ultra Wave =

Studio album by Bootsy Collins
- Released: November 12, 1980
- Recorded: 1980
- Genre: Funk
- Length: 41:13
- Label: Warner Bros.
- Producer: Bootsy Collins, George Clinton

Bootsy Collins chronology
This Boot Is Made for Fonk-N (1979)	Ultra Wave (1980)	The One Giveth, the Count Taketh Away (1982)

Ultra Wave is the fifth album released by funk musician Bootsy Collins. It was released on November 12, 1980, by Warner Bros. Records. It is the first album credited solely to Bootsy Collins, as opposed to his previous releases, which were credited to Bootsy's Rubber Band. In 2007, "Ultra Wave" was licensed through Rhino Records and reissued through the Collectors Choice music service.

== Album background ==
Ultra Wave was produced by George Clinton and Bootsy Collins, except for three songs that were produced only by Collins ("Is That My Song?", "Fat Cat", and "Sound Crack"). It was recorded at the same time as the album Sweat Band by Sweat Band, a Bootsy Collins-led project that had issued one album for CBS/Uncle Jam Records. Like Collins' previous album, This Boot is Made for Fonk-N, Ultra Wave showcases a more experimental and progressive approach.

== Critical reception ==
Professional ratings
Review scores
Source	Rating
AllMusic	3.5/5 stars
Christgau's Record Guide: The '80s	B+

The Globe and Mail wrote that "the accessible stuff here is in 'Fat Cat', a spiteful dance tune and the quite lovely 'Sacred Flower', lyrically bland but lush and deep in the backgrounds."

== Track listing ==
1. "Mug Push" (Phelps Collins, Bootsy Collins, George Clinton)
2. "F-Encounter" (Bootsy Collins, Rick Evans, Ron Ford, George Clinton)
3. "Is That My Song?" (Bootsy Collins, David Spradley)
4. "It's a Musical" (Bootsy Collins, George Clinton, Carl Small)
5. "Fat Cat" (Phelps Collins, Bootsy Collins)
6. "Sacred Flower" (Bootsy Collins, George Clinton)
7. "Sound Crack" (Bootsy Collins)

== Personnel ==
- Bootsy Collins - vocals, guitar, bass, drums, percussion
- Phelps Collins, Rick Evans - guitar
- Joel Johnson, David Lee Chong, Mark Johnson - keyboards
- Jerry Jones - drums
- Carl Small - percussion
- Fred Wesley, Maceo Parker, Richard Griffith, Larry Hatcher - horns
- David McMurray - lyricon solo on "Sacred Flower"
- Godmoma, Brandy, Parlet, Brides of Funkenstein, Robert Johnson - vocals

== Singles ==
- "Mug Push/Scenery" (Warner Bros. WBS 49599)
- "F-Encounter/Instrumental w/Rap" (Warner Bros. WBS 49661)
- "Is That My Song?" (Warner Bros. WBS 49708)

The single version of "F-Encounter" features a solo rap by Collins that was not included on the album and has never been released on CD.

The B Side of "Mug Push" contained a non-LP track entitled "Scenery" that was released on the CD compilation Back in the Day: The Best of Bootsy.
