= Lifestyles of the Roach and Famous =

Studio album by INCorporated Thang Band
- Released: 1988
- Recorded: 1988
- Genre: Funk
- Length: 40:21
- Label: Warner Bros.
- Producer: Bootsy Collins, George Clinton

Professional ratings
Review scores
Source	Rating
AllMusic	3/5 stars

Lifestyles of the Roach and Famous is an album by the P-Funk spin off act, INCorporated Thang Band. The album was released in 1988 by Warner Bros. Records. The album was produced by George Clinton and Bootsy Collins, while Andre Williams and Lige Curry serve as "Mack Roach" producers. The album concept is a parody of the television series "Lifestyles of the Rich and Famous". The album cover was designed by longtime P-Funk album artist Pedro Bell. Originally, the Incorporated Thang Band went by the name of the Tackheads, a slight reference to Jimmy G and the Tackheads which was a P-Funk spin off act fronted by George Clinton's brother Jimmy.

== Track listing ==
1. "Body Jackin'" (George Clinton, Bootsy Collins, Joseph Fiddler) (released as a single-Warner Bros 7-2832 and as a 12" single Warner 0-20709)
2. "Storyteller" (Steve Washington, George Clinton)
3. "Still Tight (George Clinton, Tracey Lewis, Garry Shider, Justin Kace) (released as a single-Warner 7-22983 and 12" single-Warner 0-21216)
4. "Androgynous View" (Steve Washington, George Clinton, Andre Foxxe)
5. "Jack of All Trades" (Andre Foxxe, Lige Curry, George Clinton)
6. "I'd Do Anything For You" (Robert Johnson, Lashawn Clinton)
7. "What If The Girl Says Yes?" (George Clinton, Bootsy Collins, Joseph Fiddler)
8. "44-22-38" (George Clinton, Jimmy Giles, Bootsy Collins, Michael Lane)

== Personnel ==
- Lige Curry – lead vocals, bass
- Andre Foxxe – lead vocals, guitar, keyboards
- Patrick "Boogie" Drummond – vocals, keyboards
- Robert "Sly" Garrett – keyboards, vocals
- Chris Bruce – guitar
- Dean Ragland – drums
- Claudia White – vocals
- Angel Keener – vocals

Additional personnel

- Michael Lane, Steve Washington, Justin Kace, Tom Norton, Joseph Fiddler, Robert Johnson - keyboards, synthesizer
- Steve Washington, Bootsy Collins, DeWayne "Blackbyrd" McKnight, Garry Shider - guitar
- Bootsy Collins, Steve Washington - bass
- Justin Kace, Bootsy Collins, Andre Williams, Steve Washington, Michael Lane - synth and drum programming
- Garry Shider, George Clinton, Tracey Lewis, Robert Johnson, Sandra Feva, Pat Lewis, Lloyd Williams, Joe Harris, Sheila Washington, Jessica Cleaves - vocals

== Video ==
"Body Jackin'" video: https://www.youtube.com/watch?v=pFVsWEGBKC4
