= Uncle Jam Records =

- Parent company: Columbia Records
- Founded: 1980
- Founder: George Clinton, Archie Ivy
- Distributor: Columbia/CBS Records
- Genre: Funk
- Country of origin: US

Uncle Jam Records was a record label formed by Parliament-Funkadelic leader George Clinton and his personal manager Archie Ivy. The label was distributed nationally by CBS Records.

Uncle Jam Records debuted in 1980 with the release of Sweat Band, the self-titled debut of that band, and Wynne Jammin' by Philippé Wynne, the former lead singer for The Spinners. Other acts that were signed to the label included singer Jessica Cleaves, Trey Lewd (Clinton's son Tracey Lewis), Sterling Silver Starship, and Gary Fabulous and the Black Slack.

The funk album Zapp was originally intended to be the first release on the Uncle Jam label. Zapp was the band of Bootsy Collins protégé Roger Troutman and this was their debut album, produced by Bootsy Collins with essential contributions by George Clinton. However, the master recordings of the album were sold to Warner Bros. Records, who released the album. This action led to the dissolution of the professional relationship between Troutman and Clinton.

The Uncle Jam Records label was briefly resurrected in 1983 with the release of Urban Dancefloor Guerillas by the P-Funk All-Stars. At that time the label was overseen by the CBS Associated label.

== Bibliography ==
- Blues And Soul Magazine, April 1981.
- Documentary: Parliament-Funkadelic: One Nation Under A Groove
