= Live in Concert 1998 =

Live In Concert 1998

Video by Bootsy Collins
- Released: 2006
- Recorded: July 11, 1998
- Genre: Funk
- Length: DVD-107:00; CD-62:01
- Label: ABC Entertainment; Charly Films

Live In Concert 1998 is a 2-disc DVD/CD set by Bootsy Collins and the New Rubber Band. The DVD features Bootsy Collins performing at the North Sea Jazz Festival on July 11, 1998. The concert was originally shown on Dutch television shortly after the performance. The DVD/CD set was released by ABC Entertainment, in conjunction with Charly Films in 2006.

== Track listing ==
Disc one (DVD)

1. Intro
2. Ahh...The Name Is Bootsy, Baby
3. Bootsy? (What's The Name Of This Town?)
4. Psychoticbumpschool
5. Keep Dah Funk Alive 4-1995
6. Party Lick-A-Bles
7. Funk Express Card
8. I'm Leavin' U(Gotta Go)
9. Who-Ya Hey
10. Bernie Solo
11. Funkentelechy
12. One Nation Under A Groove
13. Flash Light
14. Roto-Rooter
15. Bootzilla
16. Roto-Rooter
17. Good-N-Nasty
18. Save What's Mine For Me
19. I'd Rather Be With You
20. A Sacred Place (R.I.P.)
21. Medley: Stretchin' Out/Touch Somebody
22. Night Of The Thumpasorus Peoples

Disc two (CD)

Edited audio version of the DVD

== Personnel ==
- Bootsy Collins-Space Bass
- Bernie Worrell, Greg Fitz-Keyboards
- Frankie Kash Waddy-Drums
- Garry Shider, Flip Cornett-Guitars
- Flip Cornett-Bass
- Rick Gardner-Trumpet
- Don Bynum-Saxophone
- Mudbone Cooper, Henry Benifield, April Woods, Jiffy-Vocals
