= Body slam (disambiguation) =

A body slam is a professional wrestling throw.

Body slam may also refer to:

- "Body Slam" (song), a 1982 song by Bootsy Collins
- Body Slam (film), a 1986 film
- Bodyslam (band), a Thai rock band
- Body Slam, a 1986 Sega arcade wrestling video game that was adapted into the Sega Master game Pro Wrestling
- Body Slam, an episode of the A-Team TV series, featuring Hulk Hogan
