= Christmas Is 4 Ever =

Studio album by Bootsy Collins
- Released: 2006
- Recorded: 2006
- Genre: Funk, hip hop
- Length: 68:35
- Label: Shout Factory; P-Vine
- Producer: Bootsy Collins

Bootsy Collins chronology
Play with Bootsy (2002)	Christmas Is 4 Ever (2006)	Tha Funk Capital of the World (2011)

Professional ratings
Review scores
Source	Rating
Allmusic	3.5/5 stars

Christmas Is 4 Ever is a 2006 Christmas-themed album by Parliament-Funkadelic bassist Bootsy Collins. The album was released in the United States by the Shout Factory label and by P-Vine Records in Japan. The album represents the first Christmas album made by any member of the P-Funk musical collective. The album features re-workings of Christmas standards such as "Silent Night", "Merry Christmas Baby", and "Sleigh Ride", as well as original compositions such as "Happy Holidaze".

Collins stated: "I’ve wanted to do a Christmas album forever, but I never really got the chance or the time to really think about doing it and putting the effort in it."

== Track listing ==
1. "N-Yo-City" 3:05
2. "Merry Christmas Baby" 4:30
3. "Jingle Belz (Jingle Bells)" 4:58
4. "Happy Holidaze" 6:29
5. "Chestnutz (The Christmas Song)" 5:05
6. "Winterfunkyland (Winter Wonderland)" 6:57
7. "Santa's Coming (Santa Claus Is Coming to Town)" 4:58
8. "Boot-Off (Rudolph the Red-Nosed Reindeer)" 5:23
9. "Silent Night" (Traditional) 5:34
10. "Sleigh Ride" 6:03
11. "Dis-Christmiss (This Christmas)" 3:27
12. "Be-With-You" 6:12
13. "Christmas Is 4 Ever" 5:50

== Personnel ==
- Don Bynum: Saxophone
- Bobby Byrd: Background Vocals
- Tobe Casual-T: Turntables
- Candis Cheatham: Vocals, Beats
- Keith Cheatham: Guitar, Keyboards, Background Vocals, Beats
- Keith Cheatham Jr., Miguel Cheatham: Beats & Raps
- Catfish Collins: Guitar
- Charlie Daniels: Fiddle, Background Vocals
- Matt Dawson: Vocals
- Snoop Dogg: Raps
- Tobe Donohue: Percussion
- Tyreka & Tyesha Grissom (Da Blessed Twins): Background Vocals
- Michael Hampton: Guitar
- Ian "Haiku" Herzog: Beatbox
- Jerome Johnson: Background Vocals
- Razor Johnson: Keyboards
- Ron Kat: Vocals
- Kendra & Kim: Background Vocals
- Johnny Mayfield: Background Vocals
- Blackbyrd McKnight: Guitar
- Morris Mingo: Keyboards & Drums
- The NastyNattihorns: Horns
- Melvin Parker: Drums
- Paul Patterson: Live Strings, Mandolins & Violins
- MC Danny Ray: Vocal Raps
- Razzberry: Vocals
- Garry Shider: Vocals, Guitar
- Sugarfoot: Background Vocals
- Randy Villars: Saxophone
- Frankie "Kash" Waddy: Drums
- Fred Wesley: Trombone
- Teddy Wilburn: Drums
- Danielle Withers: Vocals
- Belita Woods: Vocals
- Bernie Worrell: Clavinet, Piano
- Macy Gray: Vocals
- Bobby Womack: Vocals

And Christmas Messages from:

- Bishop Don Magic Juan
- Buckethead
- Moma Willis
- George Clinton
- Roger Troutman
