= This Boot Is Made for Fonk-N =

Studio album by Bootsy's Rubber Band
- Released: 1979
- Recorded: 1979
- Genre: Funk
- Length: 44:34
- Label: Warner Bros.
- Producers: Bootsy Collins, George Clinton

Bootsy's Rubber Band chronology
Bootsy? Player of the Year (1978)	This Boot Is Made for Fonk-N (1979)	Ultra Wave (1980)

This Boot Is Made for Fonk-N is the fourth album by the American funk band Bootsy's Rubber Band, released through Warner Bros. Records in 1979. Unlike previous albums by Bootsy's Rubber Band, the album did not generate any hit singles. The album was more experimental in nature than previous efforts. It would also mark the last time that the name "Bootsy's Rubber Band" would be used on a Bootsy Collins related project until the 1982 12" single release "Body Slam". This Boot Is Made for Fonk-N peaked at number 9 on the Billboard Top R&B/Hip-Hop Albums chart and number 52 on the Billboard 200 album chart.

The album's cover was drawn by P-Funk album artist Overton Loyd. The album included an 8-page comic book titled "The Almost Finished Comic" also drawn by Loyd.

The album was produced by George Clinton and Bootsy Collins under the aliases Dr. Funkenstein and Starr-Mon. The album was reissued first in 1990 by the Warner/Pioneer company in Japan and then by Warner Music-Europe. In 2007, the album was licensed through Rhino Records and reissued through the Collectors Choice music service.

== Critical reception ==
Professional ratings
Review scores
Source	Rating
AllMusic	3/5 stars
The Encyclopedia of Popular Music	2/5 stars
The Rolling Stone Album Guide	2.5/5 stars
Smash Hits	6/10
The Village Voice	C+

The Bay State Banner noted that "Bootsy's Rubber Band now depends as much on formula and absurdity for its own sake as it does on music."

The Rolling Stone Album Guide called the album "tuneless," writing that "the giggles and hi-jinks get laid on a bit thick."

== Track listing ==
1. "Under the Influence of a Groove" (Bootsy Collins, George Clinton, Bernie Worrell) - (8:37)
2. "Bootsy (Get Live)" (Bootsy Collins, George Clinton, Maceo Parker) - (6:18)
3. "Oh Boy Gorl" (Bootsy Collins, George Clinton, Gary Cooper, Ron Dunbar) - (7:49)
4. "Jam Fan (Hot)" (Bootsy Collins, George Clinton, Phelps Collins) - (9:05)
5. "Chug-a-Lug (The Bun Patrol)" (Bootsy Collins, George Clinton, Robert Johnson, Phelps Collins) - (6:29)
6. "Shejam (Almost Bootsy Show)" (Bootsy Collins, George Clinton, Ron Dunbar) - (5:05)
7. "Reprise (Get Live)" (Bootsy Collins, George Clinton, Maceo Parker) - (0:40)

== Personnel ==
- Bootsy Collins – bass, guitars, drums, percussion
- Phelps Collins, Garry Shider, Michael Hampton – guitars
- Joel "Razor Sharp" Johnson, Bernie Worrell – keyboards
- Gary Cooper – drums, percussion, vocals
- Frank Waddy – drums
- Carl Small, Larry Fratangelo – percussion
- Fred Wesley, Maceo Parker, Richard Griffith, Rick Gardner – horns
- Robert Johnson, Greg Thomas, Chris Williams – vocals
- Hal Hansford – engineer

== Singles ==
Three singles were released from the album:

- "Jam Fan (Hot)"/"Shejam (Almost Bootsy Show)" (Warner Bros. WBS 8818)
- "Bootsy (Get Live)"/"Pt. 2" (Warner Bros. WBS 49013)
- "Under the Influence of a Groove"/"Disco" (Warner Bros. WBS 49073)

The single "Bootsy (Get Live)"/"Pt. 2" features almost two minutes of music that was not included on the album version and has never been released on CD. The B-side of "Jam Fan (Hot)", "Shejam (Almost Bootsy Show)", featured an instrumental version of the song that also was not on the album and has not been issued on CD.
