= D-Maub =

American rapper

- Also known as: D-Maub, Donny Harper
- Born: Don Errick Montra Harper; March 13, 1978 (age 48); Cincinnati, Ohio
- Genres: Christian hip hop, urban contemporary gospel
- Occupations: Singer, songwriter
- Instrument: Vocals
- Years active: 2005–present
- Labels: Dedicated, One Route, DEAD Panda Muzik
- Website: onerouteentertainment.com

Don Errick Montra "Donny" Harper (born March 13, 1978), who goes by the stage name D-Maub (Dedicated to Making All Underestimaters Believers), is an American Christian hip hop musician. His first studio album, Timeline, came out in 2005, with One Route Entertainment. D-Maub's second studio album, The Release, came out in 2008, also with One Route. His third studio album, Urban Legend, came out in 2008, again with One Route. The subsequent two studio albums were released on Dedicated Records, with 2010's Inside Out, and his Billboard chart debut album, Death Before Dishonor, in 2011. His most recent album, The Missing Peace, was released with One Route, and it charted on a Billboard chart, in 2013. He is the current president of One Route Entertainment.

== Early life ==
D-Maub was born on March 13, 1978, as DonErrick Montra Harper, in Cincinnati, Ohio, where he still continues to reside. His father was Derrick Calvin Harper Sr., who died in 2017, and mother was Donna Lee Harper (née, Tucker). His mother died in 1997.

== Personal life ==
He is married to Ciara Darnice Harper (née Langford), they reside in Cincinnati, Ohio, with their children.

== Music career ==
His first studio album, Timeline, came out in 2005, with One Route Entertainment. D-Maub's second studio album, The Release, came out in 2008, also with One Route. His third studio album, Urban Legend, came out in 2008, again with One Route. The subsequent two studio album's were released on Dedicated Records, with 2010's Inside Out, and his Billboard chart debut album, Death Before Dishonor, in 2011. His most recent album, The Missing Peace, was released with One Route, and it charted on a Billboard chart, in 2013. He is the current president of One Route Entertainment.

== Discography ==
=== Studio albums ===
List of studio albums, with selected chart positions
Title	Album details	Peak chart positions
Title	Album details	US Gos
Timeline	Released: 2005; Label: One Route; CD, digital download	–
The Release	Released: 2008; Label: One Route; CD, digital download	–
Urban Legend	Released: 2008; Label: One Route; CD, digital download	–
Inside Out	Released: 2010; Label: Dedicated; CD, digital download	–
Death Before Dishonor	Released: 2011; Label: Dedicated; CD, digital download	46
The Missing Peace	Released: 2013; Label: One Route; CD, digital download	40
