= Sweat Band =

Studio album by Sweat Band
- Released: 1980
- Recorded: 1980
- Genre: Funk
- Length: 41:44
- Label: Uncle Jam/CBS
- Producer: Bootsy Collins

Professional ratings
Review scores
Source	Rating
AllMusic	3/5 stars
Robert Christgau	C+

Sweat Band is the 1980 debut album by the P-Funk spin off act the Sweat Band. The album was the first official release on the Uncle Jam Records label, formed by George Clinton and his business manager Archie Ivy, and distributed by CBS Records. The band was formed by P-Funk bassist Bootsy Collins after losing the rights to the name Rubber Band to a folk music group of the same name. The album features many of the same musicians and singers from Bootsy's Rubber Band. The album was released during the same week as Ultra Wave, Collins' fifth album for Warner Bros. Records.

The album was produced by Bootsy Collins, while George Clinton serves as executive producer. The album was reissued on CD by CBS/Sony Records in Japan on May 21, 1994, but quickly went out of print soon after.

== Track listing ==
1. "Hyper Space" (Joel Johnson, Bootsy Collins) - 4:39
2. "Freak To Freak" (Carl Small, Bootsy Collins, Garry Shider, Jeanette Washington) (released as single Uncle Jam ZS9 9901, then as a 12" single-Uncle Jam AS 874) - 6:49
3. "Love Munch" (Maceo Parker, Bootsy Collins) - 6:47
4. "We Do It All Day Long" (Bootsy Collins, Garry Shider, Carl Small) - 2:17
5. "Jamaica" (Maceo Parker, Robert Johnson, Bootsy Collins) - 5:30
6. "Body Shop" (Garry Shider, Bootsy Collins) (released as single Uncle Jam ZS6 70067, then as a 12" single-Uncle Jam AS 945) - 7:17
7. "We Do It All Day Long" (reprise) - 8:25

== Personnel ==
- Bass: Bootsy Collins
- Guitars: Bootsy Collins, Garry Shider, Michael Hampton
- Drums: Bootsy Collins, Jerry Jones
- Keyboards: Bernie Worrell, Joel Johnson
- Percussion: Carl Small, Bootsy Collins
- Horns: Maceo Parker, Fred Wesley, Richard Griffith, Larry Hatcher
- Vocals: Bootsy Collins, Ray Davis, Linda Shider, Garry Shider, Carl Small, Larry Hatcher, Robert Johnson, Lloyd Bridges, Philippé Wynne, Jeanette Washington, Shirley Hayden, Janice Evans, Dawn Silva, Jeanette McGruder, Sheila Horne, Michael Payne, Patty Walker, Ronnie Faust.

Art Direction/Photography: Diem Jones
