= Bootsy? Player of the Year =

Studio album by Bootsy's Rubber Band
- Released: January 20th, 1978
- Recorded: 1977
- Studios: United, Detroit, Michigan; Hollywood, Hollywood, California
- Genre: Funk
- Length: 44:51
- Label: Warner Bros.
- Producers: Bootsy Collins, George Clinton

Bootsy's Rubber Band chronology
Ahh... The Name Is Bootsy, Baby! (1977)	Bootsy? Player of the Year (1978)	This Boot Is Made for Fonk-N (1979)

Singles from Bootsy? Player of the Year
- 1. "Bootzilla" Released: 1978; 2. "Hollywood Squares" Released: 1978

Bootsy? Player of the Year is the third album by the American funk band Bootsy's Rubber Band. The album was released on Warner Bros. Records on January 20, 1978. At the height of the album's popularity, it competed head to head with Bootsy Collins' mentor George Clinton and his band Parliament, who had released the album Funkentelechy Vs. the Placebo Syndrome just two months earlier. The album was produced by Clinton and Collins and arranged by "The Player". The original vinyl version of the album contained a pair of cut out star shaped eyeglasses.

The album was reissued in 1990 by Warner/Pioneer of Japan, then through WEA International in the mid-1990s and then by Time/Warner in the U.S. in April 1998.

== Reception ==
Professional ratings
Review scores
Source	Rating
AllMusic	4.5/5 stars
The Rolling Stone Album Guide	3.5/5 stars
The Village Voice	B

Bootsy? Player of the Year featured two hit singles, "Bootzilla", which went to number one on the Billboard Hot Soul Singles charts, and "Hollywood Squares". The album peaked at number one on the Billboard Soul Album charts for four non-consecutive weeks. It sold more than 500,000 copies in its first six months of release.

== Track listing ==
Radio Active / A / Side 1

1. "Bootsy? (What's the Name of This Town)" (Bootsy Collins, George Clinton, Maceo Parker) - (6:59)
2. "May the Force Be with You" (Bootsy Collins, George Clinton, Gary Cooper) - (6:02)
3. "Very Yes" (Bootsy Collins, George Clinton, Gary Cooper) - (8:24)

Monster Rock / A+ / Side 2

1. "Bootzilla" (Bootsy Collins, George Clinton) - (5:38) (released as a single-Warners WB 8512)
2. "Hollywood Squares" (Bootsy Collins, George Clinton, Frank Waddy) - (6:15)(released as a single-Warner WBS 8575)
3. "Roto-Rooter" (Bootsy Collins, George Clinton, Phelps Collins) - (6:25)
4. "As In (I Love You)" (Bootsy Collins, George Clinton, Bernie Worrell) - (5:08)

== Personnel ==
- Phelps Collins, Bootsy Collins – guitar
- Frank Waddy, Bootsy Collins, Gary Cooper – drums
- Bootsy Collins – bass
- Joel Johnson – keyboards
- Fred Wesley, Maceo Parker, Richard Griffith, Rick Gardner – horns
- Gary Cooper, Robert Johnson – vocals

== Charts ==
Year	Album	Chart positions	
Year	Album	US	US R&B
1978	Bootsy? Player of the Year	16	1

=== Singles ===
Year	Single	Chart positions		
Year	Single	US	US R&B	US Dance
1978	"Bootzilla"	—	1	—
1978	"Hollywood Squares"	—	17	—

== See also ==
- List of number-one R&B albums of 1978 (U.S.)
