= The Pinocchio Theory =

- Picture of the single sleeve for The Pinocchio Theory printed in Spain

Single by Bootsy's Rubber Band

from the album Ahh... The Name Is Bootsy, Baby!
- B-side: "Rubber Duckie"
- Released: 1977
- Genre: Funk
- Length: 6:07 (album version) 4:02 (single edit)
- Label: Warner Bros. 8328 K 16964 (UK)
- Songwriters: George Clinton; Bootsy Collins
- Producers: George Clinton; Bootsy Collins

"The Pinocchio Theory" is a 1977 single by the American Funk band Bootsy's Rubber Band. It was released by Warner Bros. Records on February 9, 1977. The single first charted in Billboard magazine's Hot Soul Singles chart in March 1977 where it peaked at number six. The B-side of "The Pinocchio Theory" is "Rubber Duckie".

Bootsy Collins explained that the Pinocchio Theory is about reaping what you sow. The song's lyric, "Don't fake the funk or your nose'll grow" inspired the character of Sir Nose D'Voidoffunk in the P-Funk mythology. George Clinton wrote that they were unwittingly building the P-Funk mythology "brick-by-brick". He also claimed that Bootsy did not know the character of Pinocchio when they wrote the song and thought Disney had ripped P-Funk off when he finally saw the movie.

== Personnel ==
- Bootsy Collins - lead vocals, bass, guitars, and drums
- Bernie Worrell - keyboards
- Joel Johnson - keyboards
- Gary Cooper, Robert Johnson - vocals
- Fred Wesley, Maceo Parker, Richard Griffith, Rick Gardner - horns
