= Keepin' dah Funk Alive 4-1995 =

Keepin' Dah Funk Alive 4-1995

Live album by Bootsy's New Rubber Band
- Released: 1995
- Recorded: June 24 and 25, 1994
- Genre: Funk
- Length: 89:11 Disc one-52:48 Disc two-36:23
- Label: P-Vine Records; Rykodisc Records
- Producer: At'c Inoue (P-Vine Records)

Bootsy's New Rubber Band chronology
Lord of the Harvest (1993)	Keepin' Dah Funk Alive 4-1995 (1995)	Fresh Outta 'P' University (1997)

Professional ratings
Review scores
Source	Rating
AllMusic	4/5 stars

Keepin' Dah Funk Alive 4-1995 is a live double CD set by Bootsy's New Rubber Band. The album was first released by P-Vine Records on January 25, 1995, and by Rykodisc in the U.S. and the UK later that same year. The album was recorded at Club Jungle Bass in Tokyo, Japan on June 24 and 25, 1994, and represents the first live recording of Bootsy and his Rubber Band. The album includes a fold-out poster.

== Track listing ==
Disc One:

1. "Intro" (Bootsy Collins) 1:38
2. "Ahh...The Name Is Bootsy, Baby" 5:19
3. "Bootsy? (What's The Name Of This Town?)" 3:40
4. "Psychoticbumpschool" 2:42
5. "The Pinocchio Theory" 2:03
6. "Hollywood Squares" 4:11
7. "Bernie Solo" (Bernie Worrell) 3:07
8. "One Nation Under a Groove" 7:14 lyrics
9. "P. Funk (Wants To Get Funked Up)" 9:38
10. "Cosmic Slop" 3:59 lyrics
11. "Flash Light" 4:46
12. "Bootzilla" 1:16
13. "Roto-Rooter" 3:10

Disc Two:

1. "I'd Rather Be With You" 10:45
2. "A Sacred Place (R.I.P.)" 7:43
3. "Medley: Stretchin' Out/Touch Somebody" (Bootsy Collins) 11:20
4. "Night of the Thumpasorus Peoples" 2:22
5. "Keepin' Dah Funk Alive 4-1995" (Bootsy Collins) 4:10

== Personnel ==
- Producer: At'c Inoue (P-Vine Records)
- Vocals: Bootsy Collins, Mudbone Cooper, Henry Benifield, Michael Gatheright
- Drums: Frankie "Kash" Waddy
- Lead Guitar: Gary "Dirty Mugg" James
- Rhythm Guitar: Flip Cornett & Bootsy Collins
- Bass: Flip Cornett
- Space Bass: "Ill-Legal Alien" Bootsy Collins
- Space Keyboards: "Ill-Legal Alien" Bernie Worrell
- Finger Funkin' Keys: Joel "Razor Sharp" or Straight Razor Johnson
- Religiously Funky Keys: Greg "Daffy Ducking" Fitz
- 3 Day Rehearsal Horn Section: Vince & Reggie Calloway, Larry Hatcher, Don Bynum, Rick Gardner
