= Fresh Outta 'P' University =

Studio album by Bootsy Collins
- Released: 1997
- Recorded: 1997
- Genre: Funk, hip hop
- Length: 73:02
- Label: WEA/Black Culture; Private I
- Producer: Bootsy Collins

Bootsy Collins chronology
Keepin' Dah Funk Alive 4-1995 (1995)	Fresh Outta 'P' University (1997)	Play With Bootsy (2002)

Fresh Outta 'P' University is a 1997 studio album by former P-Funk bassist Bootsy Collins. The album was originally released by the WEA/Black Culture label in Europe and Japan and then by Private I records (distributed by Mercury Records) in the U.S.. The album features a number of guest musicians and performers, including MC Lyte, Rodney O, D Meka, Thomas D and Smudo and Fatboy Slim.

Professional ratings
Review scores
Source	Rating
AllMusic	3/5 stars
Uncut	2/5 stars

== Numerous versions ==
Since its initial release in 1997, "Fresh Outta 'P' University" has appeared in several different configurations. These configurations include:

The deluxe 2-CD European version (WEA/Black Culture 3984 20396-2) which is contained in a special CD case that opens up into six panels that spells out the name "Bootsy".

The 2-CD Japanese "New Edition" (WPCR-10370~1) which features the entire album on disc one, and remixes of "Party-Lick-A-Ble's" and "Do The Freak" on disc two.

== Track listing ==
U.S. VERSION

1. "Off da Hook"
2. "I'm Leavin' U"
3. "Funk Ain't Broke"
4. "Party Lick-A-Ble's"
5. "Ever Lost Your Lover"
6. "Pearl Drops"
7. "Do the Freak"
8. "Fragile (So Sensitive)"
9. "Shiggy Wiggy"
10. "Wind Me Up"
11. "Good-N-Nasty"
12. "Penetration"
13. "I'm Leavin' U (Gotta Go Gotta Go)" (House Mix)
14. "Fresh Outta 'P'"
15. "Jazz-N-Yo-Shiggy" 'Dance Mix'

EUROPEAN VERSION

1. "Off da Hook"
2. "I'm Leavin' U"
3. "Funk Ain't Broke"
4. "Party Lick-A-Ble's"
5. "Ever Lost Your Lover"
6. "Pearl Drops"
7. "Do the Freak"
8. "Fragile (So Sensitive)"
9. "Holly-Wood-If-She-Could"
10. "Wind Me Up"
11. "Good-N-Nasty"
12. "Penetration (In Funk We Trust)"
13. "Home-Of-Da Freaks"
14. "Fresh Outta 'P'"

== Personnel ==
- Guitars - Ron Jennings, Garry Shider, Wilbur Longmire, Fan Fan La Tulipe, Boogieman
- Keyboards - Bernie Worrell, Ralf Petter, Johnny Davis, Bootsy Collins, Anthony Cole, Joel Johnson, Greg Fitz, Joel Johnson, Mousse T
- Horns - Fred Wesley, Allan Barnes, Dwight Adams, Ed Jones, Chris de'Margary, Avi Leibovich, Duncan Mackay
- Drums - Tony Byrd, Bootsy Collins
- Vibraharp - Vincent Montana Jr.
- Vocals - Gary Cooper, Henry Benefield, Michael Gatheright, Inaya Davis, Kristen Gray, Melanie Eiland, Garry Shider, Linda Shider, Michael Anthony, April Woods, Kyle Jason, Bootsy Collins, William Hagan, Phil Brown and Gospel Group, Mike Marshall, Herbert, Cash, Nathalie, Eugen, Caspar, and Terry
- Rappers - Be-Wise, Rodney O, MC Lyte, Omeka Sykes, Dru Down, Da Lesson, Ono, Da Brixx, Eugen, Caspar, AJ, Gizmo, Teray

== Charts ==
Chart performance for Fresh Outta 'P' University
Chart (2025)	Peak position
Croatian International Albums (HDU)	2
Hungarian Physical Albums (MAHASZ)	35
