= Ahh... The Name Is Bootsy, Baby! =

Studio album by Bootsy's Rubber Band
- Released: January 15th, 1977
- Recorded: 1976
- Studios: United Sound Systems, Detroit; Hollywood Sound Recorders, Hollywood
- Genres: Funk, psychedelic soul
- Length: 38:59
- Label: Warner Bros.
- Producers: Bootsy Collins, George Clinton

Bootsy's Rubber Band chronology
Stretchin' Out in Bootsy's Rubber Band (1976)	Ahh... The Name Is Bootsy, Baby! (1977)	Bootsy? Player of the Year (1978)

Singles from Ahh... The Name Is Bootsy, Baby!
- 1. "The Pinocchio Theory" Released: 1977; 2. "Can't Stay Away" Released: 1977

Ahh... The Name Is Bootsy, Baby! is a funk album by Bootsy's Rubber Band, released on January 15, 1977. It reached number one on Billboard's Top R&B/Soul albums chart, the first P-Funk release to achieve this goal. The album was produced by George Clinton and William "Bootsy" Collins and arranged by Bootsy and Casper (names William Collins uses to refer to his various roles).

== Reception ==
Professional ratings
Review scores
Source	Rating
AllMusic	4.5/5 stars
The Baltimore Sun	(favourable)
Christgau's Record Guide	B+
Rolling Stone	favorable
The Village Voice	B

Similar to most of Bootsy's other work, it is divided between dance tracks and slow jams. The song "The Pinocchio Theory" inspired the George Clinton creation Sir Nose D'voidoffunk (see P-Funk mythology: the song says if you fake the funk, your nose will grow, and Sir Nose fakes the funk).

The title track was inspiration for Eazy-E's 1988 track We Want Eazy, with Bootsy making a cameo appearance in the song's musical video.

== Track listing ==
Side I / El Uno – A Friendly Boo

1. "Ahh... The Name Is Bootsy, Baby" (William Collins, George Clinton, Maceo Parker) – (6:52)
2. "The Pinocchio Theory" (William Collins, George Clinton) – (6:08) (released as a single-Warner Bros. 8328)
3. "Rubber Duckie" (William Collins, George Clinton, Garry Shider) – (3:18) (released as the b-side to "The Pinocchio Theory")
4. "Preview Side Too" (William Collins, George Clinton, Gary Cooper) – (0:56)

Side II / Un Dos – Geepieland Music

1. "What's a Telephone Bill?" (William Collins, George Clinton, Gary Cooper) – (5:58)
2. "Munchies for Your Love" (William Collins, George Clinton, Gary Cooper, Garry Shider) – (9:39)
3. "Can't Stay Away" (William Collins, George Clinton) – (5:28) (released as a single-Warner Bros. 8403)
4. "Reprise: We Want Bootsy" (William Collins, George Clinton, Maceo Parker) – (0:20)

== Personnel ==
- Bootsy Collins - guitars, bass, drums
- Phelps "Catfish" Collins, Garry Shider, Michael Hampton, Glenn Goins - guitar
- Frankie "Kash" Waddy, Jerome Brailey, Gary "Mudbone" Cooper - drums
- Joel "Razor-Sharp" Johnson, Bernie Worrell - keyboards
- Casper (William Earl Collins)- bass
- Fred Wesley, Maceo Parker, Rick Gardner, Richard "Kush" Griffith - Horny Horns
- Randy Brecker, Michael Brecker - horns
- Gary "Mudbone" Cooper, Robert "P-Nut" Johnson - "front ground" vocals
- Fred Wesley, Bootsy Collins - horn arrangements

== Charts ==
Year	Album	Chart positions	
Year	Album	US	US R&B
1977	Ahh... The Name Is Bootsy, Baby!	16	1

=== Singles ===
Year	Single	Chart positions		
Year	Single	US	US R&B	US Dance
1977	"The Pinocchio Theory"	—	6	—
1977	"Can't Stay Away"	—	19	—

== See also ==
- List of number-one R&B albums of 1977 (U.S.)
