= The One Giveth, the Count Taketh Away =

Studio album by William Bootsy Collins
- Released: April 28, 1982
- Recorded: 1982
- Genre: Funk
- Length: 41:11
- Label: Warner Bros.
- Producer: Bootsy Collins

William Bootsy Collins chronology
| Ultra Wave (1980) | The One Giveth, the Count Taketh Away (1982) | What's Bootsy Doin'? (1988) |

Professional ratings
Review scores
| Source | Rating |
|---|---|
| AllMusic | 3.5/5 stars |

The One Giveth, the Count Taketh Away is an album by William Bootsy Collins, released by Warner Bros. Records. It would be the last album that Bootsy Collins would record for the label. It would also be the first album produced solely by Bootsy Collins, with the exception of the track "Shine-O-Myte (Rag Popping)" which was produced (as well as written) by Bootsy Collins and George Clinton. The album was released on April 28, 1982.

The album features performances from numerous individuals in the P-Funk/Rubber Band collective including Fred Wesley, Maceo Parker, Phelps Collins, and Godmoma. The album was reissued first in 1990 by the Warner/Pioneer company in Japan and then by Warner Music-Europe. In 2007, the album was licensed through Rhino Records and reissued through the Collectors Choice music service.

== Track listing ==
1. "Shine-O-Myte (Rag Popping)" (Bootsy Collins, George Clinton)
2. "Landshark (Just When You Thought It Was Safe)" (Bootsy Collins, George Clinton)
3. "Countracula (This One's for You)" (Bootsy Collins)
4. "#1 Funkateer" (Bootsy Collins)
5. "Excon of Love" (Bootsy Collins)
6. "So Nice You Name Him Twice" (Bootsy Collins, Maceo Parker, Joel Johnson)
7. "What's W-R-O-N-G Radio?" (Bootsy Collins, Reginald Calloway)
8. "Music to Smile By" (Bootsy Collins)
9. "Play on Playboy" (Bootsy Collins, Phelps Collins)
10. "Take-A-Lickin' and Keep On Kickin" (Bootsy Collins)
11. "The Funky Funktioneer" (Bootsy Collins, Joel Johnson)

== Personnel ==
- Bootsy Collins - bass, guitar, drums, keyboards
- Phelps Collins, Kevin Oliver, Leroy "Sugarfoot" Bonner - guitar
- Joel Johnson - keyboards
- Fred Wesley, Maceo Parker, Richard Griffith - horns
- Godmoma, Robert Johnson, Garry Shider, Ron Ford, Jeanette McGruder, Mallia Franklin, H. Bissantz, Midnight Star - background vocals

== Singles ==
- "Shine-O-Myte" (Rag Popping) (Bootsy Collins, George Clinton) (released as the B-side of "Take-A-Lickin'", then released as an A-side single-Warner 7-29965)
- "Take-A-Lickin' and Keep on Kickin" (Bootsy Collins) (released as a single-Warner WBS 50044; also released as a 12" promo single-Warner PRO-A-1019)

The single version of "Take-A-Lickin' and Keep on Kickin'" is a vocal version that is not included on the album and has never been reissued on CD. The single version of "Shine-O-Myte (Rag Popping)" is an instrumental version which was also not included on the album or reissued on CD.
