= Play with Bootsy =

Studio album by Bootsy Collins
- Released: 2002
- Recorded: 2002
- Genre: Funk, hip hop
- Length: 52:31
- Label: East-West, Thump
- Producer: Bootsy Collins

Bootsy Collins chronology
Fresh Outta 'P' University (1997)	Play with Bootsy (2002)	Christmas Is 4 Ever (2006)

Play with Bootsy is an album by Parliament-Funkadelic bassist Bootsy Collins. The album was released in 2002 by East-West Records, which is distributed by the Warner Music Group in Germany and by Warner Music-Japan. It was later released in the U.S. by Thump Records. The album represents Bootsy's 12th studio album. The album features a number of prominent rappers/musicians including Snoop Dogg, Fat Joe, Daz, Bobby Womack, Chuck D, Kelli Ali and Lady Miss Kier from Deee Lite.

== Reception ==
Christopher Treacy wrote in Bay Windows that the album is "about as bona-fide old-school as it gets ... Collins imports an interesting conglomeration of big names to flesh out the project, (Fat Boy Slim, Rosie Gaines, Snoop Dogg) ... but listening carefully, one can discern the skeletal arrangements that gave birth to these new songs and, though the guest list ends up working well, it's evident Collins is quite capable all by his lonesome". Overall, he concluded that "Collins unveils just what you'd hope for -- thick, bass-heavy tracks that marry his unique brand of personalized funk with bits of virtually every urban-music trend to emerge in the last decade ... the results are often impressive, and sometimes downright irresistible".

Music Week opined that "this is one of the most approachable albums Bootsy has made ... to purists it might smack of commercialisation, but the set highlights his status as the finest funk man on the planet". They also singled out George Clinton, Snoop Dogg and Fatboy Slim, "as artists who joined the funk". In his review for The Age, Patrick Donovan wrote that this is "the best funk album of the year ... each track is ingrained with Bootsy's sleazy, grinding bass and psychobabble ... and the laconic vocals of Snoop Dogg slip in naturally between the cosmic throbs on songs such as 'Love Gangsta' ... but it's the second half of this all-star album that really takes the listener places ... the rich soul vocals of Walker and Womack, and guitar work of Prince are breathtaking".

Ben Greenman wrote in The New Yorker that "Collins collaborates with hip-hop stars like Snoop Dogg, Fat Joe, and Fatboy Slim ... and while the Young Turks all acquit themselves admirably--Snoop Dogg's drawl pulls nicely against Bootsy's cartoonishly sweet vocals on 'Love Gangsta'--the most affecting moments are courtesy of old-timers ... the soul legend Bobby Womack contributes vocals to 'Groove Eternal', which sounds uncannily like an early Prince single, and George Clinton himself shows up for a brief but wonderful demonstration of abiding chemistry on 'Funk Ship'." Finally, Greenman added, "Bootsy's album feels like a party".

== Track listing ==
1. "Inner-Planetary-Funksmanship"
2. "Play with Bootsy"
3. "Love Gangsta"
4. "Soul Sista"
5. "Don't Let 'Em"
6. "A Life for da Sweet Ting"
7. "Groove Eternal"
8. "Dance to the Music"
9. "Funky and You Know It"
10. "I'm Tired of Good, I'm Trying Bad" featuring Lady Miss Kier
11. "All Star Funk" featuring Lady Miss Kier and Can 7
12. "The Bomb" featuring Fatboy Slim
13. "Funk Ship"
14. "Play With Bootsy" - Alex Gopher Remix (featured on the Japanese pressing - AMCE 10007)
15. "Pressin' On" (featured on the Japanese pressing - AMCE 10007)

== Musical guests/personnel ==
- Chuck D
- Professor Griff
- Fat Joe
- Bobby Womack
- Garry Shider
- George Clinton
- Kelli Ali
- Snoop Dogg
- Daz Dillinger
- Rosie Gaines
- Bernie Worrell
- Lady Miss Kier
- Fat Boy Slim
- Kristen Grey
- Fred Wesley
- Belita Woods
- Kendra Foster
- Ray Davis
- Sly Dunbar
- Robbie Shakespeare
- Michael Hampton
- Ron Jennings
- Macy Gray
- Ailsa Achat

Explaining his selection of musical guests: "There aren't enough real characters around these days, I picked them for their coolness, their attitude and particularly their voices - even if you don't know who they are immediately, you recognise their voices".

— Bootsy Collins
