= Bootzilla =

- UK picture sleeve for the single "Bootzilla"

Single by Bootsy's Rubber Band

from the album Bootsy? Player of the Year
- B-side: "Vanish In Our Sleep"; "Hollywood Squares"
- Released: January 13, 1978
- Genre: Funk
- Length: 5:39 (album version) 4:21 (single edit)
- Label: Warner Bros. 8512 K 17196 (UK)
- Songwriters: George Clinton; Bootsy Collins
- Producers: George Clinton, Bootsy Collins

"Bootzilla" is a song recorded by Bootsy's Rubber Band, released on January 13, 1978. As the lead single from the album Bootsy? Player of the Year, it held the #1 spot on the R&B chart for one week in 1978, directly after fellow P-Funk outfit Parliament's #1 hit "Flash Light". ("Flash Light" was originally penned with Bootsy Collins in mind for the lead vocal; however, Collins turned it down.) "Bootzilla" failed to make the Hot 100.

The song's lyrics introduce Bootsy's wind-up toy alter ego, Bootzilla, "the world's only rhinestone rock-star doll." The track features Bootsy Collins on drums and bass guitar.
