= Bootsy Collins =

American bass guitarist, singer, and songwriter

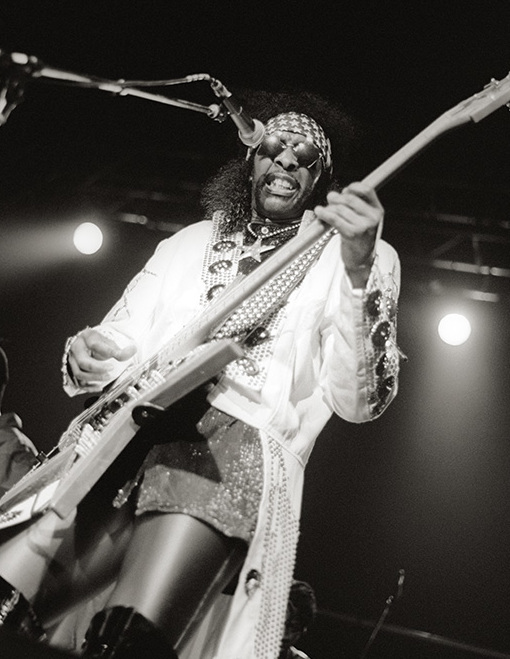
- Collins performing in 1998

Background information
- Born: William Earl Collins; October 26, 1951 (age 75); Cincinnati, Ohio, U.S.
- Genres: Funk; psychedelic soul; R&B; hip-hop
- Occupations: Musician; songwriter
- Instruments: Bass guitar; vocals; drums
- Years active: 1968–present
- Labels: Westbound; Ace; Warner Bros.; Casablanca; Shout; Columbia; P-Vine; Mascot; Roc Nation
- Formerly of: Parliament; Funkadelic; Bootsy's Rubber Band; The GrooveGrass Boyz; The J.B.'s
- Website: bootsycollins.com

William Earl "Bootsy" Collins (born October 26, 1951) is an American bass guitarist, singer, and songwriter. Rising to prominence with James Brown in the early 1970s before joining the Parliament-Funkadelic collective, Collins established himself as one of the leading names and innovators in funk music with his driving basslines and humorous vocals. He later formed his own P-Funk side project known as Bootsy's Rubber Band. He has been a frequent collaborator with musicians from a variety of genres, including dance music (Deee-Lite's "Groove Is in the Heart"), electronic big beat (Fatboy Slim's "Weapon of Choice" and "The Joker"), (Sammy Hagar's "Would You Do It For Free" & "24365"), and alternative metal (Praxis), among others. In 1997 he was inducted into the Rock and Roll Hall of Fame, along with 15 other members of Parliament-Funkadelic. In 2020, Rolling Stone ranked Collins number four in its list of the 50 greatest bassists of all time.

== Early life ==
Collins was born in Cincinnati, on October 26, 1951. He said that his mother nicknamed him Bootsy. "I asked her why," he explained to a journalist, "and she just said, 'Because you looked like a Bootsy.' I left it at that."

His brother Phelps "Catfish" Collins (1943–2010) was also a musician. He and Bootsy were once part of The Pacemakers.

Collins has maintained a strong connection with Cincinnati.

== Career ==
=== 1960s–1970s ===
In 1968 Collins formed The Pacemakers with his elder brother Phelps "Catfish" Collins, Frankie "Kash" Waddy, and Philippé Wynne. In March 1970, after most of the members of James Brown's band quit over a pay dispute, The Pacemakers were hired as Brown's backing band and became known as The J.B.'s. They are often referred to as "the original J.B.'s" to distinguish them from later line-ups that went by the same name. Although they worked for Brown for only 11 months, the original J.B.'s played on some of Brown's most intense funk recordings, including "Get Up (I Feel Like Being a) Sex Machine", "Super Bad", "Get Up, Get Into It, Get Involved", "Soul Power", "Talkin' Loud and Sayin' Nothing", and two instrumental singles, the much-sampled "The Grunt" and "These Are the J.B.'s". In regards to his tenure working for James Brown, Collins stated:

He treated me like a son. And being out of a fatherless home, I needed that father figure and he really played up to it. I mean, Good Lord. Every night after we played a show, he called us back to give us a lecture about how horrible we sounded. [Affects James Brown voice] "Nah, not on it, son. I didn't hear the one. You didn't give me the one." He would tell me this at every show. One night, we knew we wasn't sounding really good – we were off – and he calls us back there and said, "Uh huh, now that's what I'm talkin' about. Y'all was on it tonight. Y'all hit the one." My brother and I looked at each other like, "This mother has got to be crazy." We knew in our heart and soul that we wasn't all that on that show. So then I started figuring out his game, man. By telling me that I wasn't on it, he made me practice harder. So I just absorbed what he said and used it in a positive way.

In 1976 Collins, Catfish, Waddy, Joel Johnson (1953–2018), Gary "Mudbone" Cooper, Robert Johnson and The Horny Horns formed Bootsy's Rubber Band, a separate touring unit of George Clinton's Parliament-Funkadelic collective. The group recorded five albums together, the first three of which are often considered to be among the quintessential P-Funk recordings. The group's 1978 album Bootsy? Player of the Year reached the top of the Billboard R&B album chart and spawned the #1 R&B single "Bootzilla".

Like Clinton, Collins took on several alter egos, from Casper the Funky Ghost to Bootzilla, "the world's only rhinestone rockstar monster of a doll," all as parts of the evolving character of an alien rock star who grew gradually more bizarre as time went on (see P-Funk mythology). He also adopted his trademark "space bass" around this time.

=== 1980s–1990s ===
Collins released two albums in 1980: his first "solo" album Ultra Wave on Warner Bros., and Sweat Band, on George Clinton's Uncle Jam label, with a group billed as Bootsy's Sweat Band. He also was credited for co-producing the debut of P-Funk spinoff Zapp.

In 1984, he collaborated with Jerry Harrison of Talking Heads to produce "Five Minutes", a dance record sampled and edited from Ronald Reagan's infamous "We begin bombing in five minutes" speech. The record was credited to "Bonzo Goes to Washington" (also referenced in the 1985 Ramones song "Bonzo Goes to Bitburg", derived from Reagan's starring role as Professor Peter Boyd in the 1951 comedy film Bedtime for Bonzo).

After a nearly five-year hiatus, Collins had a comeback in 1988 (with some help from producer Bill Laswell). What's Bootsy Doin'? flaunted a new sound that foreshadowed the 1990s, such as the dance floor smash "Party on Plastic". Laswell introduced Collins to Herbie Hancock, resulting in Perfect Machine (1988). The techno-funk they recorded featured turntables for scratch appeal, and smoothly-stylized vocals by Leroy "Sugarfoot" Bonner of the chart-topping Ohio Players. These were the first of many collaborations between Laswell and Collins on many albums and projects, with the prolific producer using Bootsy mainly as a bassist but sometimes as a rhythm guitarist.

Also in 1988, Collins appeared as a guest artist to play bass on Keith Richards and The X-Pensive Winos album Talk is Cheap. That same year Collins also made a cameo appearance in rapper Eazy-E’s music video for We Want Eazy.

In 1989, Collins played bass on and produced several tracks of Malcolm McLaren's album Waltz Darling, credited to Malcolm McLaren and the Bootzilla Orchestra.

In 1990, Collins collaborated with Deee-Lite on their biggest hit "Groove Is in the Heart", and contributed additional vocals. Although he appeared in the music video playing the bass, the bassline in the song is actually a sample of a Herbie Hancock song called "Bring Down the Birds". Bootsy's Rubber Band became the de facto backing musicians for Deee-Lite during a world tour. The Rubber Band also recorded the EP Jungle Bass, their first recording in 11 years.

Collins joined guitarist Stevie Salas and drummer Buddy Miles to form the funk-metal fusion group Hardware in 1992. The trio released one album, Third Eye Open, before disbanding. In the same year, Collins played bass guitar on the first Praxis album (produced by Laswell): Transmutation, alongside fellow Parliament-Funkadelic member Bernie Worrell, Bryan Mantia and Buckethead.

Bootsy's New Rubber Band formed in 1994, releasing Blasters of the Universe and the live release "Keepin' dah Funk Alive 4-1995", recorded over two nights in Tokyo.

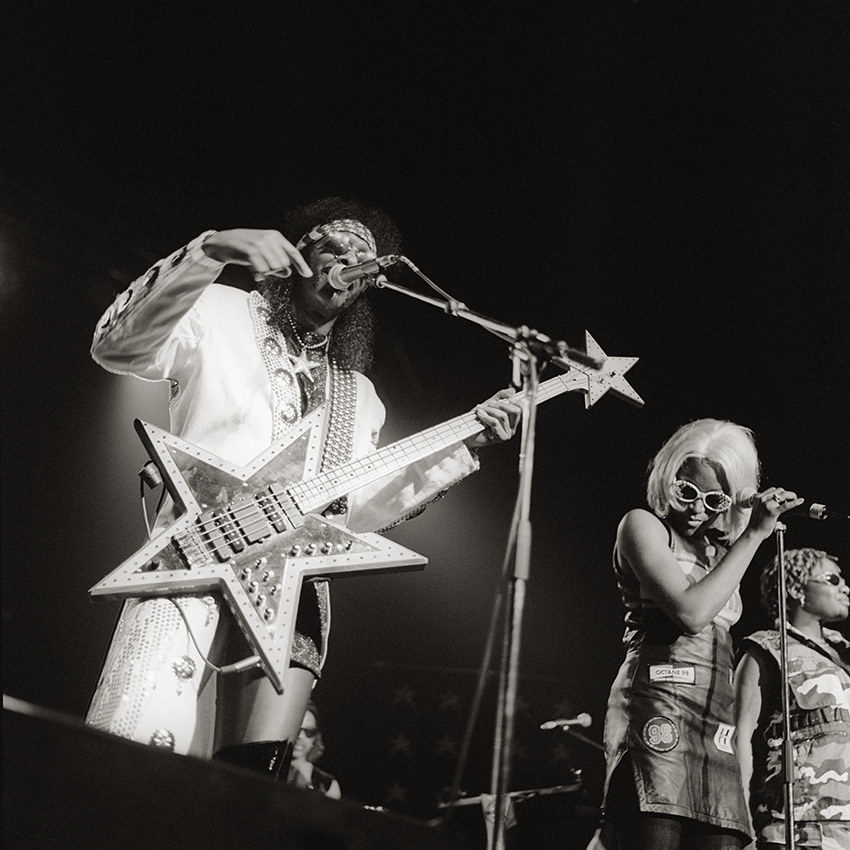
Collins performing in 1998

In 1995, Collins played in the remake of Jimi Hendrix's "If 6 Was 9", for Axiom Funk, a Funkadelic-like one-off supergroup produced by Bill Laswell and featuring (Funkadelic members) George Clinton, Bernie Worrell, Collins, Eddie Hazel, Gary Shider and Laswell. The group released only one album (Funkcronomicon), and the song also appeared in the soundtrack of the movie Stealing Beauty. He also featured on Jon B.'s song "Simple Melody" from his debut album, "Bonafide".

Collins collaborated with Del McCoury, Doc Watson and Mac Wiseman to form The GrooveGrass Boyz. They produced a fusion of bluegrass and funk.

=== 2000s–present ===
Collins provided lead vocals for the Fatboy Slim song "Weapon of Choice" from his 2000 album Halfway Between the Gutter and the Stars. Collins' vocals quote the book Dune ("Walk without rhythm and you won't attract the worm.") The song won multiple MTV Video Music Awards and a Grammy Award for Best Music Video.

In 2004 Collins contributed to Christian rap artist TobyMac's album Welcome to Diverse City, collaborating on the song "Diverse City", which was praised as one of the best on the album. The album won the 2005 Dove Award for Rap/Hip-Hop Album of the Year.

In October 2005, Collins co-wrote a song celebrating the resurgence of his hometown team, the Cincinnati Bengals of the National Football League, called "Fear Da Tiger" which features rapping written and performed by several Bengals players, including defensive end Duane Clemons, offensive tackle Stacy Andrews, and center Ben Wilkerson. An edited version of the song was made into a music video which features cameos by many other Bengals players. Collins appeared with Little Richard, Bernie Worrell, and other notable musicians as the band playing with Hank Williams, Jr. for the Monday Night Football opening during the 2006 season. Collins was the only all star to return with Williams for the 2007 season.

Collins also sings "Marshal Law", the theme song of the Cincinnati Marshals indoor football team. The song debuted in 2006, at half time of the April 29 Marshals home game against the West Palm Beach Phantoms.

In 2006, ABC Entertainment/Charly Films released a DVD and CD of Collins and the New Rubber Band's concert at the 1998 North Sea Jazz Festival. Soon after the release, Collins split from long-time friend and guitarist Odhran "The Bodhran" Rameriz, citing creative differences as the reason.

Later that same year, Collins released the holiday album Christmas Is 4 Ever. This represents the first Christmas-themed album made by a member of the P-Funk musical collective. The album features re-workings of Christmas standards as well as original compositions.

In April 2007, Collins announced plans to open Bootsy's, a restaurant/club, with Cincinnati area restaurateur Jeff Ruby. The venue operated from 2008 to 2010. It featured live musical acts, a museum dedicated to Collins's musical career and Spanish, Central and South American cuisine.

In June 2007, Collins, along with Catfish Collins, Clyde Stubblefield, John "Jabo" Starks, and Bernie Worrell, participated in the recording of the soundtrack for the movie Superbad. In December of that year they (without Worrell) went on to perform the first tribute concert remembering James Brown.

In July 2007, Collins told Billboard that he was working on a project named Science Faxtion and an album called Living on Another Frequency, in which he serves as bassist and co-producer along with his lead vocalist Greg Hampton. The band also features guitarist Buckethead and drummer Brain. The album was released in November 2008.

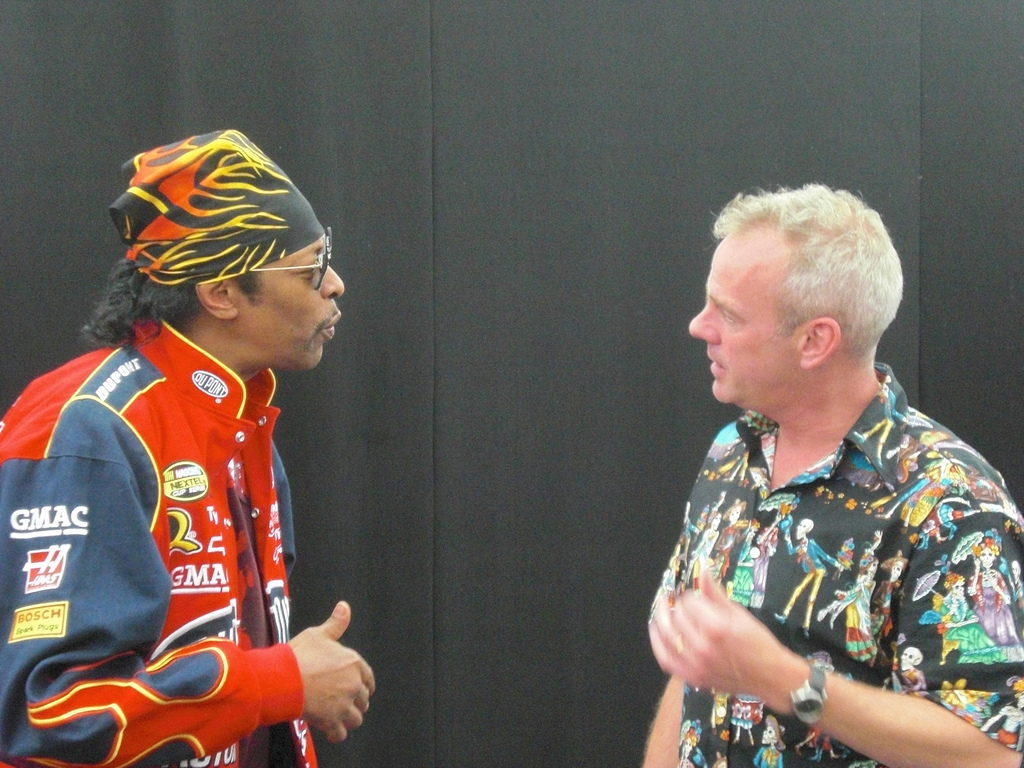
Collins and Fatboy Slim, 2008

Collins promoted Rock the Vote for its 2008 campaign together with Buckethead.

Collins portrayed a radio DJ in the 2013 video game, Grand Theft Auto V, in which several of his own songs were featured.

Collins has also collaborated extensively with Bill Laswell, Buckethead, and also frequently collaborated with fellow bassist Victor Wooten.

In 2018, Collins collaborated with singer Kali Uchis on the song "After the Storm".

On December 14, 2018, Collins played a show with Detroit-based funk artist GRiZ, and also collaborated on a new song with GRiZ.

In January 2019, Collins announced on Facebook that he would be retiring from live performances for health reasons:

Time has come for Me to tell all our Funkateers that I will Not be Playing Bass in Concerts anymore. I have decided to become a Coach for up & coming Musicians. I know u r Disappointed just think for a moment how I feel. Doc said to much pressure on my Inner-Ear & Right Hand. Yeah, I had to make up my Mind, so I did. 2019 Sheriff Ping Ping Ping will continue to Funk from the Studio but Not Live playing Bass on Stage. I know u got question & I don't have answers, maybe one day u to will understand. Just remember; That This Year will be the Funkiest Year of them All. Watch for it. Bootsy baby!!!

He wrote that he would be releasing a new album that year, and that he would continue to work in the studio and mentor young musicians.

On February 25, 2021, it was announced that Collins would be making an appearance as the "special guest host" of An Evening with Silk Sonic, the first studio album from Silk Sonic, a collaboration between Bruno Mars and Anderson .Paak. Collins was the one who came up with the band's name (much like he did with Babyface), and acts as the album's narrator, "threading" the songs together.

On July 7, 2022, Collins served as emcee for the opening ceremony of the 2022 World Games in Birmingham, Alabama.

Collins authored a memoir, titled Funked Around, Found Out, which is scheduled to release on March 23, 2027.

=== Basses ===
Collins has owned many basses, several of which are custom made. His original Space Bass and its first replacement were made in Warren, Michigan by Larry Pless of Gus Zoppi's music store. The first Space Bass had a mahogany body and maple neck, white finish, and mirror pick guard. This is the Space Bass on the cover of 1976 album Stretchin' Out in Bootsy's Rubber Band. Collins's original Space Bass guitar was stolen, but it was later recovered at a Cincinnati pawn shop and returned to him.

Another Collins signature instrument is a custom-built star-shaped bass guitar he also calls "the Space Bass", built for him by Manuel "Manny" Salvador of GuitarCraft in 1998. Collins later made an agreement with Traben to create a signature Collins model bass, "the Bootzilla". In 2010, Warwick released a customized Infinity Bass called "Bootsy Collins Black Star Signature Bass" or "Bootsy Collins Orange Star Signature Bass".

=== Funk University ===
In July 2010, Collins, in partnership with actor Cory Danziger, launched Funk University ("Funk U"), an online-only bass guitar school in which he also serves as curator and lead professor. Funk University offers an intense curriculum tailored for intermediate to advanced bass players as well as anyone interested in a deeper understanding of funk. The curriculum is based on bass theory, history of funk, and Collins's own musical history given by Collins himself, augmented by lessons and exercises in bass and rhythm from guest bassist professors such as Les Claypool, Meshell Ndegeocello, John B (Williams) and Victor Wooten. As of 2021, Funk University is defunct.

=== Funk Not Fight Movement ===
In May 2023, Bootsy and his wife, Pepperminte Patti Collins, kicked off the national Funk Not Fight Movement at the Cleveland Rock and Roll Hall of Fame with a key mission to calm violence with the power of music and dance. The movement quickly spread to communities throughout the nation with chapters, discussions, round table events and performances including Cleveland, Compton, Detroit, Fort Wayne, Columbus, Cincinnati, Austin, East Chicago, Toledo, New York City, and Atlanta.

== Legacy ==
Collins is mentioned in the song "Genius of Love" by Tom Tom Club, in the line "Clinton's musicians such as Bootsy Collins raise expectation to a new intention." "Got more bass than Bootsy Collins" is a line in the song "Rumble in the Jungle" by the Fugees. Bootsy's influence in popular culture is seen in that he has been referenced by a number of television series. In The Fresh Prince of Bel-Air episode "Sooooooul Train", Geoffrey sneaks into the Soul Train tapings posing as Collins, while in The Mighty Boosh episode "The Legend of Old Gregg" an alien creature named "The Funk" lands on Collins's house, giving him his ability to play the bass guitar "like some kinda delirious funky priest", as well as the ability to see around corners.

Red Hot Chili Peppers bassist Flea, who cited Collins as one of his primary influences, appeared in unmistakably Collins-style clothing in the video for RHCP's "Dani California".

In 2004 Collins was featured in the cover of "The Joker" on the Fatboy Slim album Palookaville. Collins served as curator and master of ceremonies at AmsterJam 2005 on Randall's Island, New York. On January 26, 2007, Collins gave the commencement address at the graduation ceremony at The Art Institute of Ohio – Cincinnati.

In a 2011 episode of Saturday Night Live hosted by Jesse Eisenberg, "The Essentials" segment showed the movie Bride of Blackenstein in which Dr. Blackenstein (Jay Pharoah), assisted by the hunchback Igor (Eisenberg), creates a bride (Nicki Minaj) for Blackenstein's Monster (Kenan Thompson). Pharoah's performance as Dr. Blackenstein is a vocal parody of Bootsy Collins (an oblique reference to the album The Clones of Dr. Funkenstein on which Collins performed).

=== Awards and achievements ===
In 1997 Collins was inducted into the Rock and Roll Hall of Fame, along with 15 other members of Parliament-Funkadelic.

Collins appeared on the Toots & the Maytals album True Love, which won the Grammy Award for Best Reggae Album in 2005.

In October 2010, Collins was awarded a Lifetime Achievement Award by Bass Player magazine at the Key Club in Los Angeles.

Collins was inducted into the National Rhythm & Blues Hall of Fame in 2016.

On July 22, 2023, Bootsy Collins was inducted into the Cincinnati Black Music Walk of Fame.

In October of 2024, Bootsy and his wife Patti Collins were presented with President's Lifetime Achievement Awards and Honorary Gold Medals for their philanthropic work spanning decades including, most recently, the Funk Not Fight Movement.

Collins is one of 800 artists included in photographer Michael Weintrob's Instrumenthead Art Truck Experience portrait series, featured at Aspen Collective gallery (Colorado) in August, 2025.

== Personal life ==
In March 2011, Collins and his wife visited Franklin L. Williams Middle School's Little Kids Rock program, donated a bass, gave the children a bass lesson, and rapped with them while they played the blues. He is now an honorary board member of the organization. Collins is an honorary member of Phi Beta Sigma fraternity.

In an April 2011 interview with The Guardian, Collins stated that, at one point in his life, he took LSD every day for over two years.

== Discography ==
- Stretchin' Out in Bootsy's Rubber Band (1976) (with Bootsy's Rubber Band)
- Ahh... The Name Is Bootsy, Baby! (1977) (with Bootsy's Rubber Band)
- Bootsy? Player of the Year (1978) (with Bootsy's Rubber Band)
- This Boot Is Made for Fonk-N (1979) (with Bootsy's Rubber Band)
- Ultra Wave (1980)
- Sweat Band (1980) (with Sweat Band)
- The One Giveth, the Count Taketh Away (1982)
- What's Bootsy Doin'? (1988)
- Blasters of the Universe (1993) (with Bootsy's New Rubber Band)
- Lord of the Harvest (1993) (as Zillatron)
- Fresh Outta 'P' University (1997)
- Play with Bootsy (2002)
- Christmas Is 4 Ever (2006)
- Tha Funk Capital of the World (2011)
- World Wide Funk (2017)
- The Power of the One (2020)
- Album of the Year No. 1 Funkateer (2025)

== Filmography ==
In 2005 Collins appeared with Madonna, Iggy Pop, Little Richard, and The Roots' Questlove, in an American TV commercial for the Motorola ROKR phone.

Collins is featured in the 2002 documentary Standing in the Shadows of Motown.

Collins voices the character Boötes Belinda in the Loonatics Unleashed episode "The Music Villain".

In 2009, Collins appeared in the Everybody Hates Chris episode "Everybody Hates Tasha".

Collins is the voice of Jimi Hendrix in the 2010 documentary, Jimi Hendrix: Voodoo Child, which is based on Hendrix's own words from letters, interviews and other printed materials.

Collins played an alien version of himself in the Williams Street spring break special Freaknik: The Musical on Adult Swim in March 2010.

On April 15, 2011, he appeared on Later... with Jools Holland, performing a memorable snippet of funk with Jools.

In the fall of 2011, Collins was featured in a television commercial for Old Navy in which he makes "boots made by Bootsy" to be sold at Old Navy.

He was also featured on an episode of Yo Gabba Gabba! on the Nick Jr. Channel.

In 2022, Collins guest starred as himself at the end of "Mid-Season Finale", an episode of The Patrick Star Show, a spin-off of Nickelodeon's SpongeBob SquarePants.

== Tour ==
In June 2011, Collins played the 10th Annual Bonnaroo Music and Arts Festival in Manchester, Tennessee.

Collins hosted Detroit Music Weekend's Funk Festival on August 26, 2023.

A tribute concert honoring Bootsy Collins was held on August 8, 2025, at the Music Hall Center for the Performing Arts in Detroit. The concert featured performances by Zapp Band, Kern Brantley and D-Town Funk, One Way and Lil Asmar.
