= Maceo Parker discography =

This is the discography for American jazz musician Maceo Parker.

== As bandleader ==
Credits for Maceo Parker as band leader
Year	Artist	Album	Label
1970	Maceo & All the King's Men	Doing Their Own Thing	House of the Fox / Charly Records
1972	Maceo & All the King's Men	Funky Music Machine	Excello
1974	Maceo	Us	People / P-Vine
1989	Maceo Parker	For All the King's Men	4th & Broadway
1990	Maceo Parker	Roots Revisited	Verve / Minor Music
1991	Maceo Parker	Mo' Roots	Verve / Minor Music
1992	Maceo Parker	Life on Planet Groove	Verve / Minor Music
1993	Maceo Parker	Southern Exposure	Jive / Novus / Minor Music
1994	Maceo Parker	Maceo (Soundtrack)	Minor Music
1998	Maceo Parker	Funk Overload	What Are Records? / ESC
2000	Maceo Parker	Dial: M-A-C-E-O	What Are Records? / ESC
2003	Maceo Parker	Made by Maceo	What Are Records? / ESC
2005	Maceo Parker	School's In!	BHM Productions
2007	Maceo Parker	Roots & Grooves	Intuition / Heads Up
2012	Maceo Parker	Soul Classics	Listen2 Entertainment / Razor & Tie
2018	Maceo Parker	Life On Planet Groove - Revisited	Verve / Minor Music
2018	Maceo Parker	It's All About Love	Leopard
2020	Maceo Parker	Soul Food: Cooking With Maceo	Mascot Label Group / The Funk Garage

== As sideman ==
Credits for Maceo Parker as a sideman
Year	Artist	Album	Label
1964	James Brown	Out of Sight	PolyGram
1969	James Brown	Say It Loud, I'm Black and I'm Proud	Polydor / Umgd
1970	James Brown	Sex Machine	Polydor / Umgd
1972	James Brown	Get on the Good Foot	PolyGram
1972	Johnny Hammond	The Prophet	Kudu
1973	James Brown	The Payback	Polydor / Umgd
1974	James Brown	Hell	Polydor / Umgd
1975	James Brown	Reality	PolyGram
1976	Bootsy Collins	Stretchin' Out in Bootsy's Rubber Band	Warner Bros.
1976	Parliament	The Clones of Dr. Funkenstein	Island / Mercury
1975	Parliament	Mothership Connection	Island / Mercury
1977	Bootsy Collins	Ahh... The Name Is Bootsy, Baby!	Warner Bros.
1977	Parliament	Live: P-Funk Earth Tour	Island / Mercury
1977	Parliament	Funkentelechy Vs. the Placebo Syndrome	Island / Mercury
1977	Fred Wesley	A Blow for Me, A Toot for You	Atlantic
1978	Parliament	Motor Booty Affair	Island / Mercury
1978	Bernie Worrell	All the Woo in the World	Arista
1979	Bootsy Collins	This Boot Is Made for Fonk-N	Warner Bros.
1979	Parliament	Gloryhallastoopid	MCA
1980	Bootsy Collins	Ultra Wave	Warner Bros.
1980	Parliament	Trombipulation	PolyGram
1983	P-Funk All Stars	Urban Dancefloor Guerillas	Sony
1983	George Clinton	You Shouldn't-Nuf Bit Fish	Capitol
1985	George Clinton	Some of My Best Jokes Are Friends	Capitol
1985	Red Hot Chili Peppers	Freaky Styley	EMI
1986	James Brown	Gravity	Volcano
1986	James Brown	James In the Jungle Groove	Polydor / Umgd
1986	Ryuichi Sakamoto	Futurista	
1987	Mico Wave	Cookin' from the Inside Out!!!	Columbia
1987	Yvonne Jackson	I'm Trouble	Ichiban
1988	James Brown	James Brown's Funky People, Pt. 2	Polydor / Umgd
1988	Bootsy Collins	What's Bootsy Doin'?	Sony
1988	Keith Richards	Talk Is Cheap	EMI
1989	Criminal Element Orchestra	Locked Up	Atlantic
1990	Various Artists	Gramavision 10th Anniversary Sampler	Gramavision
1990	Deee-Lite	World Clique	Elektra / Wea
1990	Living Colour	Time's Up	Sony
1990	P-Funk All Stars	Live at the Beverly Theatre in Hollywood	Westbound
1990	Fred Wesley	New Friends	PolyGram
1990	Rev. Billy C. Wirtz	Backslider's Tractor Pull	HighTone
1991	James Brown	Messing with the Blues	PolyGram
1991	Material	The Third Power	Axiom
1991	Bernie Worrell	Funk of Ages	Rhino
1991	Kenny Neal	Walking on Fire	Alligator
1991	Various Artists	House Party 2	MCA
1992	Bachir Attar	The Next Dream	CMP
1992	10,000 Maniacs	Our Time in Eden	Elektra / Wea
1992	Deee-Lite	Infinity Within	Elektra / Wea
1993	Various Artists	The Best Jazz Is Played with Verve	PolyGram
1993	George Clinton	"P" Is the Funk	AEM
1993	Candy Dulfer	Sax-A-Go-Go	Sony
1993	Color Me Badd	Time and Chance	Warner Bros.
1993	Bernie Worrell	Blacktronic Science	Gramavision
1993	Bryan Ferry	Taxi	Warner Bros.
1993	Various Artists	Manifestation: Axiom Collection II	PolyGram
1993	James Brown	Soul Pride: The Instrumentals (1960–1969)	PolyGram
1993	De La Soul	Buhloone Mindstate	Rhino
1993	Hans Theessink	Call Me	Deluge
1993	Dave Koz	Lucky Man	Capitol
1993	George Clinton	Plush Funk	Aem
1993	Bernie Worrell	Blacktronic Science	Gramavision
1994	Bootsy Collins	Blasters of the Universe	Rykodisc
1994	Pedro Abrunhosa	Viagens	PolyGram
1994	Bryan Ferry	Mamouna	Virgin
1994	Nils Landgren Funk Unit	Live in Stockholm	Red Horn
1992	The JB Horns	I Like It Like That	Soulciety
1995	Parliament	The Best of Parliament: Give Up the Funk	PolyGram
1995	Fred Wesley	Say Blow by Blow Backwards	Aem
1995	Larry Goldings	Whatever It Takes	Warner Bros.
1995	Brooklyn Funk Essentials	Cool And Steady And Easy	Groovetown Records
1995	Various Artists	Back to Basics, Vol. 2	Instinct
1996	James Brown	Foundations Of Funk: A Brand New Bag	Polydor / Umgd
1996	Various Artists	Little Magic in a Noisy World	Act
1996	Various Artists	A Celebration of Blues: The New Breed	Celeb. of Blues
1997	Various Artists	Booming on Pluto: Electro for Droids	Ambient
1997	Kenny Neal	Deluxe Edition	Alligator
1997	Phil Upchurch	Whatever Happened to the Blues	Go Jazz
1999	Ani DiFranco	To The Teeth	Righteous Babe Records
1999	Prince	Rave Un2 The Joy Fantastic	NPG
2001	Dave Matthews Band	Live in Chicago 12.19.98	RCA
2001	Ani DiFranco	Revelling/Reckoning	Righteous Babe Records
2002	Prince and The New Power Generation	One Nite Alone... Live!	NPG
2002	Prince and The New Power Generation	One Nite Alone... the aftershow: it ain't over!	NPG
2003	Prince and The New Power Generation	C-Note	NPG
2004	Prince	Musicology	NPG / Columbia
2006	Prince	3121	NPG / Universal
2007	Prince	Planet Earth	NPG / Columbia
2007	Various Artists	Goin' Home: A Tribute to Fats Domino	Vanguard
2008	Prince	Indigo Nights	NPG
2009	Prince	Lotusflower	NPG

== Filmography ==
Film credits for Maceo Parker
Year	Artist	Album	Label
2000	Prince	Rave Un2 the Year 2000	NPG Music Club
2002	Maceo Parker	Roots Revisited	Arthaus Musik
2003	Prince	Live at the Aladdin Las Vegas	NPG Music Club
2004	Maceo Parker	My First Name Is Maceo	Minor Music
