= Rodney Jones (guitarist) =

American jazz guitarist and bandleader (born 1956)

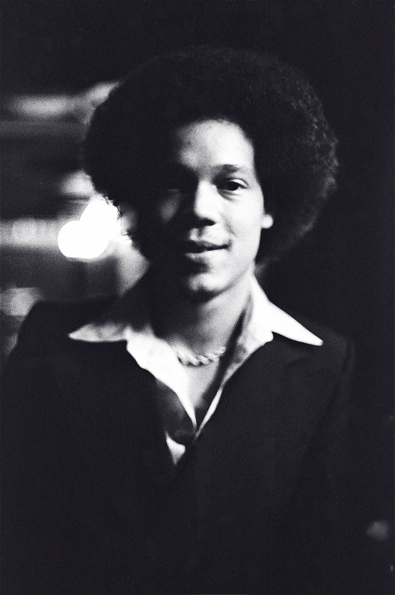
- Jones in 1977

Background information
- Born: August 30, 1956 (age 69); New Haven, Connecticut, U.S.
- Genres: Jazz
- Occupations: Musician, teacher
- Instrument: Guitar
- Years active: 1970s–present
- Labels: Strata-East, Timeless, Musicmasters, Blue Note, Savant

Rodney Jones (born August 30, 1956) is an American jazz guitarist who worked with Jaki Byard, Chico Hamilton, Dizzy Gillespie, and Lena Horne and as a bandleader. He is cited as a jazz guitarist who uses modern quartal harmony. Jones is a faculty member at Juilliard.

== Discography ==
Credits adapted from AllMusic and Bandcamp.

=== As leader ===
Year released	Title	Label	Personnel/Notes
1977	The Liberation Of Contemporary Jazz Guitar	Strata-East	With Bruce Johnson (guitar)
1978	Articulation	Muse	With Bemshi Jones (voice), Bernadine Davis (flute), Wallace Roney (trumpet), Arthur Blythe and Bob Mintzer, Kenny Kirkland (piano), Benjamin Brown (bass), Kenwood Denard (drums)
1980	When You Feel Love	Timeless	With Fred Lipsius (reeds), Kenny Kirkland (piano), Marcus Miller (bass), Buddy Williams (drums)
1981	Friends	Rodney Jones	With Fred Lipsius (keyboards, woodwinds), Jeff Pope (drums)
1983	My Funny Valentine	Timeless	With Tommy Flanagan, Major Holley (bass), Jesse Hameen (drums)
1992	The Unspoken Heart	Minor Music	With Mark Sherman (piano, keyboards, percussion), Mark Egan (bass), Peter Grant (drums)
1996	The "X" Field	Transparent Music	With Greg Osby (sax), Kevin Hays (piano), Kenny Davis (bass), Eric Harland (drums)
1996	Right Now	Minor Music	With George Coleman (sax), Will Boulware (organ, piano), Benjamin Brown (bass), Eric Harland (drums)
1999	The Undiscovered Few	Blue Note	With Earl Gardner and Tim Hagans (trumpet), Greg Osby and Morris Goldberg(alto sax), Donald Harrison and Tim Ries (tenor sax), Charles Gordon (trombone), Shedrick Mitchell (piano), Lonnie Plaxico (bass), Eric Harland (drums)
2001	Soul Manifesto	Blue Note	With Arthur Blythe and Maceo Parker (alto sax), Dr. Lonnie Smith (organ), Lonnie Plaxico (bass, Idris Muhammad (drums)
2003	Soul Manifesto Live!	Savant Records	With Teodross Avery (tenor sax), Will Boulware (electric piano, organ), Lonnie Plaxico (bass), Kenwood Dennard (drums)
2005	Dreams And Stories	Savant Records	With Kenny Kirkland (piano), Marc Johnson (bass), Jeff "Tain" Watts (drums)
2009	A Thousand Small Things	18th & Vine	With Donald Harrison (alto sax), Michael Kanan (piano), Lonnie Plaxico (bass) and Carl Allen (drums)

=== As sideman ===
With Ruth Brown

- Blues On Broadway (Fantasy, 1989)
- Fine and Mellow (Fantasy, 1992)
- The Songs of My Life (Victor, 1993)
- R+B=Ruth Brown (Bullseye Blues, 1997)

With Lena Horne

- We'll Be Together Again (Blue Note, 1994)
- An Evening with (Blue Note, 1995)
- Being Myself (Blue Note, 1998)

With Jimmy McGriff

- You Ought to Think About Me (Headfirst, 1990)
- Right Turn On Blue (Telarc, 1994)
- McGriff's Blues (K-Tel, 1994)
- Straight Up (Milestone, 1998)
- McGriff's House Party (Milestone, 2000)
- McGriff Avenue (Milestone, 2002)

With Maceo Parker

- Roots Revisited (Minor Music; Verve, 1990)
- Mo' Roots (Minor Music; Verve, 1991)
- Life on Planet Groove (Minor Music; Verve, 1992)
- Southern Exposure (Minor Music; RCA Novus, 1993)
- Roots Revisited: The Bremen Concert (Minor Music, 2015)

With Lucky Peterson

- Organ Soul Sessions: Brother Where Are You? (Universal/EmArcy, 2009)
- Organ Soul Sessions: Mercy (Universal/EmArcy, 2009)
- Organ Soul Sessions: The Music Is the Magic (Universal/EmArcy, 2009)
- Organ Soul Sessions (Universal/EmArcy, 2009) 3-CD set

With others

- Brian Culbertson, 20 Anniversary Tour (Oakland, 2015)
- Carl Allen & Rodney Whitaker, Get Ready (Mack Avenue, 2007)
- Carl Allen & Rodney Whitaker, Work to Do (Mack Avenue, 2009)
- Ernestine Anderson, Love Makes the Changes (HighNote, 2003)
- Victor Bailey, Bottom's Up (Atlantic, 1989)
- Hamiet Bluiett, Makin' Whoopee (Mapleshade, 1997)
- Ray Brown, Blues for Jazzo (Prevue, 1998)
- Ray Brown, Moonlight in Vermont (Prevue, 1998)
- Kenny Burrell, Generation (Blue Note, 1987)
- Kenny Burrell, Pieces of Blue and the Blues (Blue Note, 1988)
- Ann Hampton Callaway, Signature (N-Coded Music, 2002)
- James Carter, Present Tense (EmArcy, 2008)
- Regina Carter, Rhythms of the Heart (Verve, 1999)
- Keyshia Cole, 11:11 Reset (Epic, 2017)
- Larry Coryell, Sketches of Coryell (Shanachie, 1996)
- Noah Creshevsky, The Twilight of the Gods (Tzadik, 2010)
- Noah Creshevsky, The Four Seasons (Tzadik, 2013)
- Charles Earland, Coming to You Live (Columbia, 1980)
- Eliane Elias, Everything I Love (Blue Note, 1999)
- Pee Wee Ellis, Sepia Tonality (Minor Music, 1994)
- Dizzy Gillespie, Dizzy's Party (Pablo, 1976)
- Chico Hamilton, Chico Hamilton and the Players (Blue Note, 1976)
- Donald Harrison, Free to Be (Impulse!, 1999)
- Vincent Herring, American Experience (MusicMasters, 1990)
- Jennifer Holliday, The Song Is You (Shanachie, 2013)
- Dave Koz, At the Movies (Capitol, 2007)
- Carmen Lundy, Night and Day (CBS/Sony, 1987)
- Gloria Lynne, This One's On Me (HighNote, 1998)
- Christian McBride, Bringin' It (Mack Avenue, 2017)
- Christian McBride, Without Further Ado, Vol 1 (Mack Avenue, 2025)
- Houston Person, The Opening Round (Savant, 1997)
- Houston Person, I'm Just a Lucky So and So (HighNote, 2019)
- Irene Reid, Movin' Out (Savant, 2003)
- Irene Reid, Thanks to You (Savant, 2004)
- Hilton Ruiz, El Camino (Novus, 1988)
- Hilton Ruiz, Strut (Novus, 1989)
- Lonnie Smith, Too Damn Hot (Palmetto, 2004)
- Billy Strayhorn, Lush Life (Blue Note, 2007)
- Akira Tana, Secret Agent Men (Sons of Sound, 2002)
- Frankie Valli, Romancing the '60s (Universal Motown, 2007)
- Fred Wesley, Comme Ci Comme Ca (Minor Music, 1991)
- Reuben Wilson, Azure Te (18th & Vine, 2009)
