= Blacktronic Science =

Studio album by Bernie Worrell
- Released: 1993
- Genre: Funk
- Length: 55:57
- Label: Gramavision
- Producer: Bernie Worrell, Bill Laswell

Bernie Worrell chronology
Funk of Ages (1990)	Blacktronic Science (1993)	Pieces of Woo: The Other Side (1993)

Blacktronic Science is the third solo album by the former Parliament-Funkadelic keyboardist Bernie Worrell. The album was released by Gramavision Records in 1993.

== Production ==
The album was produced by Worrell and Bill Laswell. It is a P-Funk reunion of sorts, as it contains guest appearances by George Clinton, bassist Bootsy Collins, trombonist Fred Wesley, singer Gary "Mudbone" Cooper, and saxophonist Maceo Parker. Tony Williams played drums on some of the tracks. Sly Dunbar provided the drum loop for "Dissinfordollars".

== Critical reception ==
Professional ratings
Review scores
Source	Rating
AllMusic	3/5 stars
Chicago Tribune	3/4 stars
The Indianapolis Star	3/4 stars
The Philadelphia Inquirer	3/4 stars
USA Today	4/4 stars

USA Today deemed the album an "ambitious, wildly eclectic project." The Austin American-Statesman noted that it finds Worrell "extending the Mothership Connection into the hip-hop age, while a couple of string-laden chamber cuts reflect his classical training."

The Philadelphia Inquirer determined that "Worrell seems to be expanding the definition of funk by juxtaposing it with other traditions ... 'Revelation in Black Light' features [Worrell] playing some lyrical harpsichord with an overlay of strings that has an almost baroque feel to it." The Oregonian wrote that Worrell "uses hip hop and '60s jazz organ stylings as two elements in his alchemical new masterpiece."

== Track listing ==
1. "Revelation in Black Light" (Worrell) 2:24
2. "Flex" (Worrell, James Sumbi, Bill Laswell, Mike Small, George Clinton) 6:03
3. "Time Was (Events in the Elsewhere)" (Worrell, George Clinton, Bill Laswell, Bootsy Collins) 7:20
4. "Blood Secrets" (Worrell) 6:47
5. "Dissinfordollars" (Worrell, George Clinton, Bootsy Collins) 6:30
6. "The Vision" (Worrell, James Sumbi, Mike Small, Bill Laswell) 8:03
7. "Won't Go Away" (Worrell, Mike Small, Bill Laswell) 5:56
8. "X-Factor" (Worrell, Maceo Parker) 11:51
9. "Disappearance" (Worrell) 0:51

== Personnel ==
"Revelation in Black Light"

- Harpsichord: Bernie Worrell
- Material Strings: Arranged by Bernie Worrell

"Flex"

- Organ, Mini Moog: Bernie Worrell
- Guitar: Bootsy Collins
- Saxophone: Maceo Parker
- Trombone: Fred Wesley
- Loops: Bill Laswell
- Beats: Bill Laswell, Darryl Mack
- Vocals: James Sumbi aka J-Sumbi (All & All and Freestyle Fellowship), Mike G, George Clinton, Bootsy Collins, Gary Cooper

"Time Was"

- Organ, Synthesizer, Mini Moog, Melodica: Bernie Worrell
- Cowbells: Aïyb Dieng
- Samples: Bill Laswell
- Vocals: Bernie Worrell, George Clinton, Bootsy Collins, Gary Cooper, Debra Barsha

"Blood Secrets"

- Organ: Bernie Worrell
- Alto Saxophone: Maceo Parker
- Drums: Tony Williams

"Dissinfordollars"

- Synthesizer, Clavinet, Mini Moog: Bernie Worrell
- Guitar: Bootsy Collins
- Alto Saxophone: Maceo Parker
- Trombone: Fred Wesley
- Drum Loop: Sly Dunbar
- Chatan: Aĩyb Dieng
- Sound Effects: Bill Laswell
- Vocals: George Clinton, Bootsy Collins, Gary Cooper

"The Vision"

- Clavinet, Synthesizer, Electric Piano: Bernie Worrell
- Acoustic Bass: Bootsy Collins
- Alto Saxophone: Maceo Parker
- Trombone: Fred Wesley
- Drum Loop: Sly Dunbar
- Talking Drums, Chaton, Cowbells: Aiyb Dieng
- Vocals: James Sumbi, Mike G

"Won't Go Away"

- Synthesizer, Clavinet, Mini Moog: Bernie Worrell
- Material Strings: Arranged by Bernie Worrell
- Guitar: Bootsy Collins
- Loops: Bill Laswell
- Vocals: Mike G, George Clinton, Gary Cooper

"X-Factor"

- Organ: Bernie Worrell
- Flute, Alto Saxophone: Maceo Parker
- Drums: Tony Williams

"Disappearance"

- Material Strings-arranged by Bernie Worrell

Conducted by Karl Berger
