= New Friends =

New Friends is a 1990 jazz album by trombonist Fred Wesley. It was released on the German label Minor Music and on the US label Antilles.

== Personnel ==
- Fred Wesley - trombone, vocals (track 2)
- Maceo Parker - alto saxophone, percussion
- Anthony Cox - bass
- Bill Stewart - drums
- Geri Allen - keyboards
- Tim Green - tenor saxophone, soprano saxophone, percussion
- Robin Eubanks - trombone (tracks 5 and 8)
- Steve Turre - trombone (tracks 5 and 8)
- Stanton Davis - trumpet, flugelhorn
- Carmen Lundy - vocals (tracks 4 and 9)

== Track listing ==
1. "Rockin' in Rhythm" (Harry Carney, Duke Ellington, Irving Mills)
2. "Honey Love" (Clyde McPhatter, Jerry Wexler)
3. "Bright Mississippi" (Thelonious Monk)
4. "The Love We Had" (Terry Callier, Larry Wade)
5. "For The Elders" (Fred Wesley)
6. "Plenty, Plenty Soul" (Milt Jackson, Quincy Jones)
7. "Blue Monk" (Thelonious Monk)
8. "Peace Fugue" (Fred Wesley)
9. "Eyes So Beautiful As Yours" (Elmo Hope)
10. "Birks' Works" (Dizzy Gillespie)
11. "D-Cup And Up" (Fred Wesley)
