= Dial: M-A-C-E-O =

Studio album by Maceo Parker
- Released: 2000
- Genre: Jazz, funk
- Length: 54:37
- Label: ESC (Euro); What are Records? (USA)
- Producer: Maceo Parker, Daniel Wise, Prince

Maceo Parker chronology
Funk Overload (1998)	Dial: M-A-C-E-O (2000)	Made by Maceo (2003)

Dial: M-A-C-E-O is an album by saxophonist Maceo Parker, released in 2000. Many guest musicians appear on the album, including Prince, Paul McCartney, and Ani DiFranco.

The album peaked at No. 44 on the Billboard Jazz Albums chart.

== Critical reception ==
Professional ratings
Review scores
Source	Rating
AllMusic	3.5/5 stars
The Encyclopedia of Popular Music	3/5 stars

Mother Jones wrote that the album "spotlights Maceo’s understated vocals and intricate saxophone licks ... Dial Maceo has the feel of a party." The Guardian wrote: "The modern special guest album is an even more sinister update of the old-fashioned supergroup ... Dial: M.A.C.E.O is by no means the worst of its kind, but it's proof that even the most free-spirited are no longer safe." The Globe and Mail thought that "Parker's sax is candy-floss sweet, and as stylish as a good suit, but it needs more structural support than it gets from his writing."

== Track listing ==
All tracks composed and arranged by Maceo Parker; except where indicated

1. "Dial M-A-C-E-O" (00:23)
2. "Rabbits in the Pea Patch" (5:10)
3. "My Baby Loves You" (3:23)
4. "I've Got Work to Do" (O'Kelly Isley, Ronald Isley, Rudolph Isley) - (4:02)
5. "The Greatest Romance Ever Sold" (Prince) - (5:38)
6. "Black Widow" (Corey Parker) (4:56)
7. "Coin Toss" (2:55)
8. "Simply Tooley" (4:28)
9. "Latin Like" (4:40)
10. "The Closer I Get to You" (James Mtume, Reggie Lucas) - (5:30)
11. "My Love" (Linda McCartney, Paul McCartney) - (4:05)
12. "Homeboy" (9:24)
13. "Baby Knows" (Prince)

== Personnel ==
- Maceo Parker - Flute (tracks: 4 to 6, 8, 11), Saxophone [Alto] (tracks: 2, 3, 5, 7 to 12), Vocals (tracks: 2, 3, 4, 7 to 9, 11)
- Rodney "Skeet" Curtis - Bass (tracks: 2 to 4, 6 to 12a)
- Jamal Thomas - Drums (tracks: 2, 3, 7 to 10, 12), Kevin Hupp (tracks: 4, 6, 11)
- Bruno Speight - Guitar (tracks: 2 to 4, 6 to 12a)
- Will Boulware - Organ (tracks: 2 to 4, 6 to 12a)
- Kevin Hupp - Percussion (tracks: 3, 4, 6, 9, 10, 12)
- Vincent Henry - Saxophone [Tenor] (tracks: 3, 7, 9, 10)
- Greg Boyer - Trombone (tracks: 3, 4, 7 to 10, 12a)
- Ron Tooley - Trumpet (tracks: 3, 4, 7 to 10, 12a)
- Sweet Charles Sherrell - Vocals (tracks: 2, 4)
- Audrey Martells - Vocals (tracks: 2, 4, 6, 10)
- Corey Parker - Vocals (tracks: 2, 4, 6)
- Diann Sorrell - Vocals (tracks: 2, 4, 6, 10)
- Producer, Recorded By, Mixed By – Daniel Wise (tracks: 1 to 4, 6 to 12a)
- Mastered By – Greg Calbi
