= Southern Exposure (album) =

Studio album by Maceo Parker
- Released: 1993
- Genre: Jazz, funk
- Label: Novus
- Producer: Stephan Meyner, Maceo Parker

Maceo Parker chronology
Life on Planet Groove (1992)	Southern Exposure (1993)	Maceo (1994)

Southern Exposure is an album by the American musician Maceo Parker. It was released in 1993. Although marketed as a jazz album, Parker considered it to be "98%" funk.

The album peaked at No. 33 on Billboard's Jazz Albums chart.

== Production ==
The album was produced by Stephan Meyner and Parker. The Rebirth Brass Band played on the album, as did Leo Nocentelli and George Porter Jr. of the Meters. Parker's ex-bandmates Fred Wesley and Pee Wee Ellis played trombone and tenor saxophone, respectively. The album was recorded in New Orleans.

== Critical reception ==
Professional ratings
Review scores
Source	Rating
AllMusic	4.5/5 stars
Calgary Herald	B
The Encyclopedia of Popular Music	3/5 stars
The Indianapolis Star	3.5/4 stars
MusicHound R&B: The Essential Album Guide	4/5 stars

The Boston Globe praised the "stripped-bare style of vintage New Orleans funk." The Philadelphia Inquirer wrote that "Parker works simple blues phrases into a spitfiring fury."

The Calgary Herald stated that the "music is rooted in the chattering percussion and jerky rhythms of New Orleans, with heavy emphasis on the blues." The Indianapolis Star noted that, "on Joe Zawinul's 'Mercy, Mercy, Mercy', a favorite cover of black college bands, Parker and the Rebirth Brass Band add their own Dixieland swagger, the tempo maintained nicely by Philip Frazier's rumbling tuba."

AllMusic wrote that "Parker's alto sounds close to Hank Crawford at times but with a phrasing of his own."

== Track listing ==
No.	Title	Length
1.	"Blues for Shorty Bill"
2.	"Keep On Marching"
3.	"Mercy, Mercy, Mercy"
4.	"Every Saturday Night"
5.	"The Way You Look Tonight"
6.	"Splashin'"
7.	"Walking Home Together"
8.	"Sister Sanctified"
9.	"Fun in the Sun"

== Personnel ==
- Guitar: Rodney Jones, Leo Nocentelli
- Bass: George Porter Jr.
- Organ: Will Boulware
- Drums: Herman "Roscoe" Ernest III, Keith Frazier, Ajay Mallory, Bill Stewart
- Percussion: Michael Ward
- Saxophone: Pee Wee Ellis, Roderick Paulin
- Horns: Stafford Agee, Philip Frazier, Kermit Ruffins, Derrick Shezbie, Reginald Steward, Fred Wesley
