= Funk of Ages =

Studio album by Bernie Worrell
- Released: 1990
- Recorded: 1990
- Studio: Mission Control, Westford, Massachusetts; Greenpoint, Brooklyn
- Genre: Funk
- Label: Gramavision
- Producer: Bernie Worrell, Joe Blaney, Bill Laswell

Bernie Worrell chronology
All the Woo in the World (1978)	Funk of Ages (1990)	Blacktronic Science (1993)

Funk of Ages is a solo album by former Parliament-Funkadelic keyboardist Bernie Worrell. The album was released in 1990 by Gramavision Records. It includes contributions by numerous guest musicians, including Sly and Robbie, David Byrne, Herbie Hancock, Keith Richards, Vernon Reid, and Phoebe Snow. P-Funk bandmates Bootsy Collins, Maceo Parker, Gary Cooper, Doug Duffey, and Michael Hampton also contributed.

"Outer Spaceways" was written by Sun Ra. "Volunteered Slavery" was written by Rahsaan Roland Kirk.

== Critical reception ==
Professional ratings
Review scores
Source	Rating
AllMusic	4.5/5 stars
Chicago Tribune	3/4 stars
Orlando Sentinel	4/5 stars

Patricia Smith, of The Boston Globe, listed Funk of Ages as the best album of 1990. The Chicago Tribune wrote that "Worrell's surprisingly supple voice shines on a couple of melodic reggae numbers, 'Real Life Dreams' and 'Sing'." The Toronto Star determined that "the musicianship is adventurous enough to make for a funky, wide-ranging diversion."

== Track listing ==
1. "Sing" (Worrell, Michael Hampton, David Byrne) 4:34
2. "B.W. Jam" (Worrell, Gary Cooper, Joe Polanco) 3:30
3. "Funk-A-Hall-Licks" (Worrell, Bootsy Collins, Cooper, Doug Duffey) 5:20
4. "Ain't She Sweet" (Jack Yellen, Milton Ager) 5:02
5. "Y-Spy" (Worrell, Steve Jordan, Charley Drayton) 4:27
6. "Real Life Dreams" (Worrell, David Nyce) 4:43
7. "Beware of Dog" (Worrell, Dougie Bowne) 2:37
8. "Straight Ahead" (Worrell, Sheila Washington, John Denicola, Patty Maloney, Gil Small) 3:59
9. "Don't Piss Me Off" (Worrell, Jerry Harrison, Charlie Midnight) 4:26
10. "Volunteered Slavery/Bern's Blues/Outer Spaceways" (Rahsaan Roland Kirk/Worrell/Sun Ra) 4:45
11. "At Mos' Spheres" (Worrell) 3:55
12. "Real Life Dreams On" (Worrell, David Nyce) 1:39

== Personnel ==
- Sing
- Synthesizer, Organ, Synth Bass, Lead Vocals: Bernie Worrell
- Drums: Steve Ferrone
- Guitar: Michael Hampton, Jimmy Ripp
- Electric Sitar: Jimmy Ripp
- Percussion: Larry Fratangelo
- Background Vocals: David Byrne, Gary Cooper, Sheila Washington
- B.W. Jam
- Clavinet, Synthesizer, Synth Bass, Percussion: Bernie Worrell
- Drum Programming, Synth Horns, Samples, Sequencing: Joe Polanco, Gary Cooper
- Horns: Uptown Horns
- Background Vocals: Bernie Worrell, Gary Cooper, Sheila Washington, Steve Washington, Jenny Douglas-Foote
- Funk-A-Hall-Licks
- Clavinet, Synthesizer, Organ, Lead Vocals: Bernie Worrell
- Bass: Bootsy Collins
- Drums: Steve Jordan
- Keyboard: Herbie Hancock
- Guitar: Keith Richards, Jimmy Ripp, Bootsy Collins
- Saxophone: Maceo Parker
- Background Vocals: Gary Cooper, Sheila Washington, Jody Bell, Doug Duffey
- Ain't She Sweet
- Arrangement: Bernie Worrell, Bootsy Collins
- Piano, Synth Bass: Bernie Worrell
- Bass, Drum Programming: Bootsy Collins
- Synthesizer: Bernie Worrell, Herbie Hancock
- Percussion: Larry Fratangelo
- Banjo: Jimmy Ripp
- Vocals: Bernie Worrell, Bootsy Collins, Gary Cooper
- Y-Spy
- Clavinet, Synthesizer, Organ, Lead Vocals: Bernie Worrell
- Drums: Steve Jordan
- Bass, Snare, Lap Steel Guitar: Charley Drayton
- Guitar: Keith Richards, Steve Jordan
- Percussion: Steve Jordan, Charley Drayton
- Vocals: Steve Jordan, Gary Cooper, Loren Qualls
- Real Life Dreams
- Organ, Clavinet, Synthesizer, Lead Vocals: Bernie Worrell
- Drums: Sly Dunbar
- Bass: Robbie Shakespeare
- Guitar: Jimmy Ripp, Steve Jordan
- Percussion: Larry Fratangelo, Gary Cooper
- Background Vocals: Sheila Washington, Jody Bell
- Beware of Dog
- Clavinet, Organ, Synthesizer: Bernie Worrell
- Guitar: Vernon Reid
- Drums: Doug Bowne
- Bass: Jimmy Hawkes
- Saxophone: Maceo Parker
- Straight Ahead
- Clavinet, Synthesizer, Synth Bass, Lead Vocals: Bernie Worrell
- Drums: Steve Ferrone
- Guitar: Jimmy Ripp
- Bass: Warren McRae
- Background Vocals: Gary Cooper, Sheila Washington, Patty Maloney,

John Denicola, Michael Camacho, Doug Duffey

- Don't Piss Me Off
- Synthesizer, Synth Bass, Samples: Bernie Worrell
- Lead Vocals: Phoebe Snow, Gary Cooper
- Organ: Jerry Harrison
- Drums: Dennis Chambers
- Volunteered Slavery
- Producer: Bill Laswell
- Organ, Electric Piano: Bernie Worrell
- Vocals: Bernie Worrell, Gary Cooper
- Chatan, Conga, Tambourine, Bells: Aïyb Dieng
- At Mos' Spheres
- Producer: Bill Laswell
- Organ: Bernie Worrell
- Real Life Dreams On
- Organ, Clavinet, Synthesizer: Bernie Worrell
- Drums: Sly Dunbar
- Bass: Robbie Shakespeare
- Guitar: Jimmy Ripp, Steve Jordan
- Percussion: Larry Fratangelo, Gary Cooper
