= Pieces of Woo: The Other Side =

Studio album by Bernie Worrell
- Released: 1993
- Recorded: 1993
- Genres: Classical, experimental
- Length: 50:30
- Label: CMP
- Producers: Bernie Worrell, Bill Laswell

Bernie Worrell chronology
Blacktronic Science (1993)	Pieces of Woo: The Other Side (1993)	Free Agent: A Spaced Odyssey (1997)

Pieces of Woo: The Other Side is an album by the former Parliament-Funkadelic keyboardist Bernie Worrell. It was released by CMP Records in 1993. None of the tracks contain drums or percussion. Pieces of Woo features Fred Wesley, Buckethead, and Umar Bin Hassan.

== Critical reception ==
The New Straits Times praised "the funk-flavoured 'The Mask' and the noise exercise 'Gladiator Skull'," deeming them "full of forceful organ ripples that create an awe-inspiring wall of sound."

AllMusic called the album "a jaw-dropping, delightful adventure of unexplored and unexpected sonic realms."

== Track listing ==
1. "Witness for the Defense" (Fred Wesley, Worrell) 5:17
2. "Set the Tone/Victory" (Amina Claudine Myers, Umar Bin Hassan, Worrell) 9:48
3. "The Mask" (Buckethead, Worrell) 7:43
4. "Gladiator Skull" (Bill Laswell, Worrell) 4:13
5. "Moon over Brixton" (Alfred Ellis, Wesley) 6:02
6. "Judie's Passion Purple" (Bill Laswell, Worrell) 14:43
7. "Fields of Play" (Oz Fritz, Bill Laswell, Worrell) 2:45

== Personnel ==
Witness for the Defense

- Organ, Synthesizer: Bernie Worrell
- Trombone: Fred Wesley
- French Horn: Vincent Chancey
- Bass Clarinet: Marty Ehrlich
- Bassoon: Janet Grice
- Clarinet: Patience Higgins
- Woodwind Arranger: Bernie Worrell

Set the Tone/Victory

- Mini Moog, Clavinet: Bernie Worrell
- Organ: Bernie Worrell, Amina Claudine Myers
- Vocal Narration: Umar Bin Hassan

The Mask

- Organ: Bernie Worrell
- Guitar, Effects: Buckethead

Gladiator Skull

- Organ, Synthesizer: Bernie Worrell
- Beats, Loops, Samples: Bill Laswell

Moon over Brixton

- Organ: Bernie Worrell
- Trombone: Fred Wesley
- French Horn: Vincent Chancey
- Bass Clarinet: Marty Ehrlich
- Bassoon: Janet Grice
- Clarinet: Patience Higgins
- Noise: Bill Laswell
- Woodwind Arranger: Bernie Worrell

Judie's Passion Purple

- Electric Piano, Organ: Bernie Worrell
- Organ: Amina Claudine Myers
- Noise: Bill Laswell

Fields of Play

- Synthesizer: Bernie Worrell
- Samples, Effects: Bill Laswell
- Sounds: Oz Fritz
