= Kellis Parker =

American legal scholar and musician

- Born: January 13, 1942; Kinston, North Carolina
- Died: October 10, 2000 (aged 58); New York, New York
- Title: Isidor and Seville Sulzbacher Professor of Law
- Relatives: Maceo Parker, Melvin Parker (brothers)

Academic background
- Education: University of North Carolina (BA, 1964); Howard Law School (JD, 1968)

Academic work
- Discipline: Law
- Institutions: UC Davis School of Law, Columbia Law School

Kellis Earl Parker (January 13, 1942 – October 10, 2000) was an American legal scholar and teacher, including as the first African-American professor at Columbia Law School, civil rights activist, and jazz trombonist.

== Early life and education, 1942-1969 ==
=== Early years (1942-1960) ===
Kellis Parker was born in Kinston, North Carolina. His parents, Maceo Parker Sr. and Novella Parker, ran the East End Dry Cleaners, the only African-American-owned dry cleaners in the county. When Kellis' father first attempted to open the dry cleaning establishment, local white businessmen did not welcome the competition, and he was beaten by police, arrested on a false charges of selling moonshine, convicted in a 15-minute trial, and imprisoned for two years, events that Kellis would cite decades later as a law professor.

Kellis and his siblings learned music from their parents (both parents sang in church, and their father also played piano and drums), and Kellis formed a jazz trio with two younger brothers—Kellis on trombone, Maceo Jr. on trumpet, and Melvin on drums—starting when one of the three was in fifth grade. The trio was called the Blue Note Juniors, named for a band in which their uncle played called Bobby Butler and the Mighty Blue Notes; the Blue Note Juniors would play during intermissions of that band's shows.

When he was in high school, as the leader of his (segregated) school's band, Parker successfully convinced the Kinston Chamber of Commerce to stop putting African-American marching bands at the back of parades.

=== College education (1960-1964) ===
Parker attended the University of North Carolina from 1960 to 1964, where he was one of the first African-American students (the first three African-American undergraduates had enrolled five years earlier, in 1955) and one of only four or five African-American students in his class. He was active in the student chapter of the NAACP, and led campus and local civil rights activism. For example, Parker organized demonstrations that helped desegregate UNC facilities, and he coordinated the boycott of a movie theater in Durham that refused to integrate.

In August 1963, apparently as a college prank on the Durham County Citizens Council, a white supremacist organization, someone enrolled Parker as a member. This event was noted with amusement in regional news stories, which pointed out that the group's membership application had no place to indicate race. One story described Parker as a student "known as a leader in civil rights demonstrations in his hometown. He also is a member of the executive council of Citizens United for Racial Equality and Dignity (CURED), an integrationist group of students."

In addition to being a civil rights activist, Parker was also a leader among students. He was selected as Secretary of the YMCA for the 1963–64 school year. In 1962, Parker was one of five U.S. delegates who traveled to Lavardia, Greece, with his hometown raising funds for his travel, as the first African-American undergraduate delegate to the United Nations International Students Conference. In April 1963, Parker became the first African-American elected to a campus-wide office at UNC when he was elected as one of four delegates to the National Student Association, coming "a close second" out of eight candidates to Inman Allen, the son of Atlanta mayor Ivan Allen Jr. Parker was chairman of the Collegiate Council of the UN at Carolina, and, according to the student paper, "a leading figure in the UN Model Assembly." On April 30, 1963, the UNC student newspaper, The Daily Tar Heel, published an editorial by Parker entitled "The Negro at Carolina: How Integrated Are We?"—its first article by an African-American student. He was a member of two university honorary societies that recognize exemplary students, the Order of the Grail and the Order of the Old Well.

Parker worked his way through college as a musician, playing with acts including Martha and the Vandellas and James Brown.

=== Law school and clerkship (1965-1969) ===
Parker attended Howard Law School from 1965 to 1968. He graduated first in his class, was editor-in-chief of the Howard Law Journal, and was editor of the student newspaper, The Barrister.

After graduating from law school, Parker spent a year as a law clerk for Judge Spottswood William Robinson III on the United States Court of Appeals for the District of Columbia Circuit, who became a mentor and encouraged Parker to teach.

== Academic career, 1969-2000 ==
=== U.C. Davis (1969-1971) ===
Parker taught at UC Davis Law School from 1969 to 1971. He ran the school's Martin Luther King Program, as well as a summer prelaw program to encourage underrepresented students to attend law school.

=== Columbia (1972-2000) ===
In 1972, Parker joined the Columbia Law School faculty, becoming the school's first African-American professor. (Two months earlier, Ruth Bader Ginsburg had become the school's first tenured female professor.) In 1975, he earned tenure, becoming a full professor. In 1994, Columbia appointed Parker to an endowed chair, as the Isidor and Seville Sulzbacher Professor of Law.

=== Teaching and mentoring ===
Courses that Parker taught at Columbia include one on music contract law called "Jazz Roots Revisited: The Law the Slaves Made." David Leebron, then dean of Columbia Law School, said in 2000, "Professor Parker's classes in contract law and seminars on the music industry, remedies, and the roots of African-American law educated and edified many generations of students."

Parker regularly played his trombone in law school classes to illustrate a point. Ruth Phillips, a law professor who had been both a public defender and a concert pianist, wrote that Parker established a jazz-based model for lawyering and advocacy: "Parker proposed jazz as critical method. Jazz as collaboration, disagreement, and dissonance, mediated by the soloist, with soloism understood as a personal, passionate autobiography. He saw in jazz an inclusive enterprise, which informed his political work in a profound and personal way. "

Parker mentored a generation of Columbia Law students, particularly students of color. One, New York First Deputy Mayor Sheena Wright, said about Parker, "He took care of us. He watched over us. He made a way for us." As a Columbia Law student, Brad Meltzer chose Parker as his advisor for an independent study project to write a novel. After Parker read the manuscript, his only comment to Meltzer was "Keep going, baby." The novel, The Tenth Justice, later earned Meltzer a six-figure advance and became a best-seller. And Parker provided more expansive praise for the novel to a The New York Times interviewer, comparing Meltzer to F. Scott Fitzgerald. Meltzer later said, "It just takes one person saying yes. I'll forever be thankful to Kellis Parker."

During student protests at Columbia in 1996, Parker earned widespread praise for his leadership in defusing the situation by talking with protesting students, acting as an advisor to them, and helping them both achieve their goals and avoid legal trouble. For example, Professor Robert O'Meally, who founded and led Columbia's Center for Jazz Studies, wrote that "the quiet resolution of that issue . . . was substantially due to his quiet professionalism, his calm under pressure, his humor, his energy for negotiation, his eloquence, his concern for the curriculum and his more profound concern for those brave youngsters who finally did win the day for all of us." According to fellow professor Eben Moglen, Parker's actions "helped save this university from a conflagration."

=== Scholarship ===
In 1975, Parker published Modern Judicial Remedies: Cases and Materials, described as "the first casebook to introduce civil rights remedies into the law school curriculum." Articles he wrote include "Standing and Public Law Remedies," "Ideas, Affirmative Action, and the Ideal University," and "Law and the Black Experience: A Minority Report."

Parker has been credited with inventing the concept of "antiremedy," described as "a remedy gone wrong," a remedy that creates or exacerbates another problem.

Columbia Law professor Kendall Thomas wrote that "Kellis Parker's work as an intellectual was informed by a vision of how the law looks from the standpoint of those who are on bottom of the social order."

His scholarship "used jazz as a framework for interpreting the law." O'Meally, the jazz scholar, explained that Parker "conceived of the music, not only jazz but its antecedents in ragtime, blues, spirituals, as providing uniquely sharp, broad lenses through which to examine American history. For him, the music itself comprised a set of invisible laws of the American community, notably the black U.S. community; rules and values, stances and attitudes (some of which cannot be put into words but only into sound and cadence) that have sustained our group and which told an otherwise untold story of struggle and sacrifice and violence and perseverance." Along these lines, Parker posited that African-Americans use improvisation in order to follow a higher law, saying, "The law that sent my daddy to jail was not the law we respected."

== Civil rights work ==
In 1977, Parker took a year-long leave of absence from Columbia to become director of the NAACP Legal Defense and Educational Fund, a position he retained after his return to Columbia. He also advised the Center for Constitutional Rights on litigation strategy.

== Personal life ==
Two of Parker's brothers are renowned musicians: Maceo Parker, who played saxophone with James Brown, George Clinton's Parliament/Funkadelic, Prince, and as a solo artist; and Melvin Parker, who played drums with James Brown.

Parker said in 1981 that he played the trombone every day. Parker organized jazz groups at both law schools where he taught. At Columbia, Parker played with a jazz ensemble called Together that performed at law school events and played at least three dates at the Cotton Club, on 125th Street in Harlem, in May and June 1981, with Parker's brother Maceo joining for some performances. Parker later played with a band called Parker that included his son Kellis Jr. and his daughter-in-law Darliene. He performed with the Don Shaw Group at the Naples Jazz Festival in 1999.

Parker said in 1981 that the musicians he most enjoyed working with were his brothers: "I'm a different musician when they're around. With others it was fine, but with my brothers it's a different high, like the difference between Off and On Broadway." One source states that Kellis Parker was a cousin of the great jazz saxophonist Charlie Parker, although another source states (about Kellis's brother Maceo) that they are unrelated.

Parker had five children: Kimberly, Shilla, Emily, Kellis Jr., and Kai. Kellis Parker Jr., now known as Kellindo, is the lead guitarist and a songwriter for Janelle Monáe, and has also worked with Prince, Stevie Wonder, No Doubt, Bruno Mars, and Earth, Wind & Fire, and as a solo artist.

Parker died on October 10, 2000, at St. Luke's-Roosevelt Hospital Center in New York City, of acute respiratory distress syndrome, which struck him in late September 2000.
