= The Apples (Israeli band) =

The Apples התפוחים
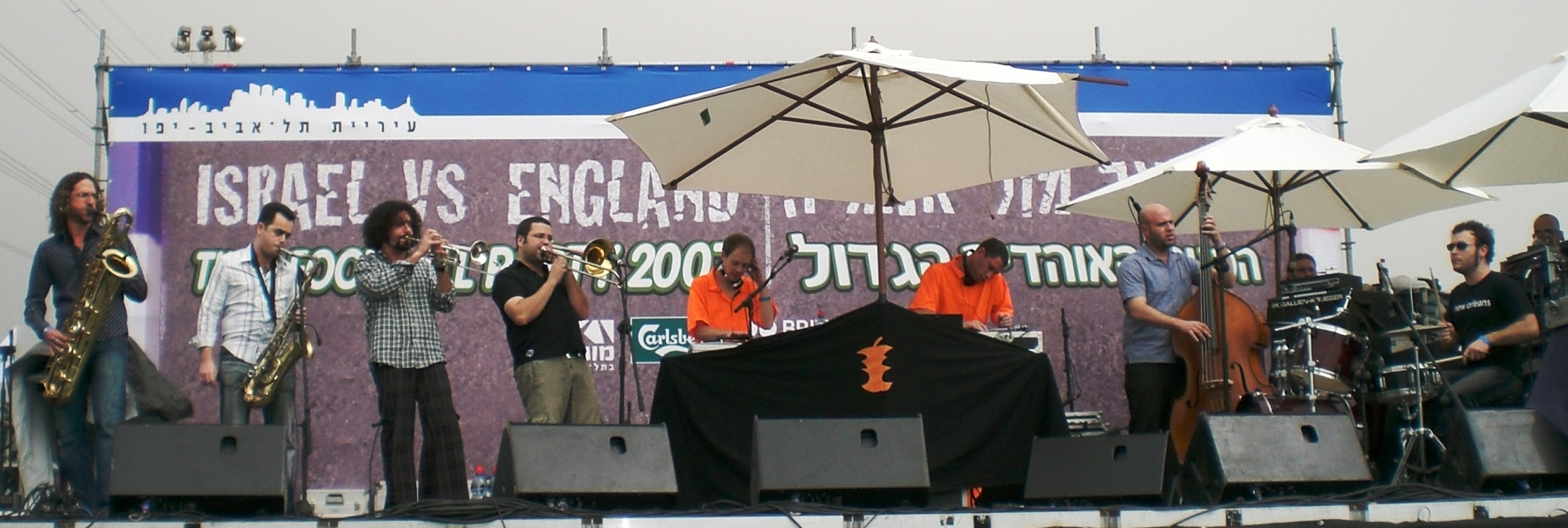
- Perform live in Tel Aviv, March 23, 2007 (from left to right): Yuval Tabachnik, Oleg Nayman, Arthur Krasnobaev, Yaron Ouzana, Ofer "Schoolmaster" Tal, Erez Todres, Shai Ran, Yoni Halevy.

Background information
- Origin: Tel Aviv, Israel
- Genres: Funk, Jazz, Turntablism
- Years active: 2002–present
- Labels: Freestyle Records, Audio Montage Entertainment
- Members: Ofer "Schoolmaster" Tal Uri "Mixmonster" Wertheim; Yonadav Halevy; Yaron Ouzana; Arthur Krasnobaev; Oleg Nayman; Yakir Sasson; Erez Todres Elad Muskatel
- Past members: Shai Ran, Alon Carmeli, Yuval Tabachnik
- Website: theapples.net

The Apples (Hebrew: התפוחים) is an Israeli band, consisting of a drummer, upright bassist, 4 brass, 2 DJs and a sound console operator. They play funk, jazz and groove.

The Apples started out in 2002, when a friend assembled the members of RadioTrip (Ofer Tal, known as SchoolMaster, and Uri Wertheim, known as MixMonster), drummer Yoni Halevy and bassist Shai Ran. The idea was to create a funky base combined with samples, scratching, and a dominant brass division. Their first impressions were actually spontaneous improvisations, which formed the basis of The Apple's first album, "Mitz" (Hebrew for "juice"), published on 2003, which was recorded in one recording session.

Their second album, "Attention!" was released in October 2005. The album launch was accompanied by a tour culminating in New Year's Eve at the "Comfort" club in Tel Aviv in front of an audience of about 700 people. The UK edition of "Attention!" was released in 2006. The record contains a bonus track: "Strip Ahskrac 'first Hebrew'". In May 2008, The Apples released their third album "Buzzin' About", and in 2010, they released their fourth album, "Kings". The band collaborated with Fred Wesley, the Trombonist musical director of James Brown, and Shlomo Bar, lead singer Natural Selection.

== Band members ==
- Yonadav Halevy – drums
- Elad Muskatel – double bass
- Arthur Krasnobaev – trumpet
- Yaron Ouzana – trombone
- Oleg Nayman – tenor and soprano saxophone
- Yakir Sasson – baritone saxophone
- Marky Funk - turntables
- Erez Todres – turntables
- Uri "MixMonster" Wertheim – sound and effects

=== Past members ===
- Shai Ran – double bass
- Alon Carmeli – double bass
- Ofer "SchoolMaster" Tal – turntables
- Yuval Tabachnik – baritone saxophone

== Discography ==
=== Studio albums ===
- Mitz (2003)
- Attention! (2005)
- Buzzin' About (2008)
- Kings (2010)
- Fly On It (2012)
- Dragonz (2016)

=== Appearances ===
- Mediterranean Grooves and Raw Sounds (2011)
  - Thang (previously unreleased)
