= Mop Mop =

Italian musician

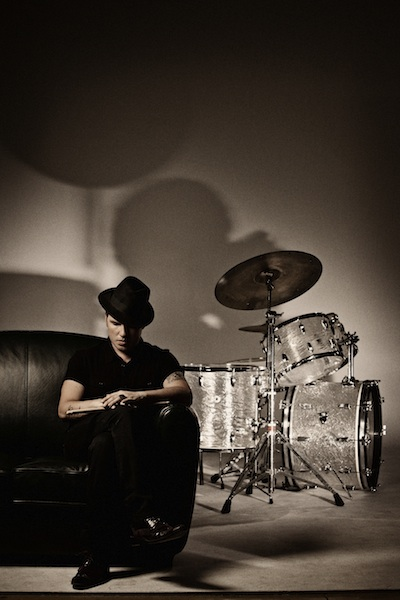

Background information
- Born: March 14, 1977 (age 48)
- Origin: Cesena, Italy
- Genres: Jazz, funk, world music, nu-jazz
- Occupation(s): Bandleader, composer
- Instrument: Drums
- Years active: 2005–present
- Labels: Agogo, INFRACom!
- Website: Official website

Andrea Benini (born March 14, 1977), better known by his stage name Mop Mop, is an Italian musician and producer. He performs with his band, the Mop Mop Combo, as well as a DJ worldwide. Mop Mop achieved international recognition when he was included in the soundtrack of Woody Allen's To Rome With Love in 2012.

Mop Mop's single "Run Around", featuring Funk legend Fred Wesley on trombone and Anthony Joseph on vocals, has been charted as best dancefloor jazz track of 2013 according to Red Bull Music Academy Germany.

== Mop Mop Combo personnel ==
- Andrea Benini - Drums
- Anthony Joseph - Vocals
- Alex Trebo - Piano, Keyboards
- Pasquale Mirra - Vibraphone
- Salvatore Lauriola - Bass
- Telonio - Bass
- Danilo Mineo - Percussion

== Discography ==
=== Studio albums ===
- The 11th Pill (2005, Tam Tam Studio)
- Kiss of Kali (2009, INFRACom!)
- Ritual of the Savage (2010, INFRACom!)
- Isle of Magic (2013, Agogo)
- Lunar Love (2016, Agogo)

=== EPs and singles ===
- Perfect Day EP, 12" EP (2006)
- Locomotive, Single (2008)
- Kiss of Kali, 12" EP (2008)
- Ritual of the Savage Remix, EP (2010)
- Ash, Single (2010)
- Ritual of the Savage Remix Vol2, EP (2011)
- Remixed : A Tropical Reconstruction, 12" EP (2013)
