= Free Agent: A Spaced Odyssey =

Studio album by Bernie Worrell
- Released: 1997
- Recorded: 1997
- Genres: Funk, experimental
- Length: 42:12
- Label: Polystar Records
- Producers: Bernie Worrell; Bill Laswell (additional production)

Bernie Worrell chronology
Pieces of Woo: The Other Side (1993)	Free Agent: A Spaced Odyssey (1997)	Improvisczario (2007)

Free Agent: A Spaced Odyssey is the fifth solo album by former Parliament-Funkadelic keyboardist Bernie Worrell. The album was released by Polystar Records in Japan in 1997. The album features guest musicians Buckethead, Umar Bin Hassan and Bill Laswell. Free Agent has never been distributed by any major or independent record label outside Japan.

== Track listing ==
1. "Hope Is Here" (Bernie Worrell)
2. "AfroFuturism (Phased One)" (Bernie Worrell, Bill Laswell)
3. "In Pursuit" (Bernie Worrell, Dominic Kanza)
4. "WOO Awakens, The Wizard Cometh" (Bernie Worrell)
5. "Re-Enter Black Light (Entersection)" (Bernie Worrell, Jean Pierre Sluys)
6. "Warriors Off to WOO" (Bernie Worrell)

== Personnel ==
- Hamid Drake - Drums, Tabla, Percussion
- Aïyb Dieng - Chatan, Congas, Percussion, Bells
- Dominic Kanza - Guitar
- Buckethead - Guitar
- Bill Laswell - Bass, Bells
- Jean Pierre Sluys - Bass, Guitar, Beats, Sound EFX
