= Susanne Alt =

German jazz saxophone player and composer (born 1978)

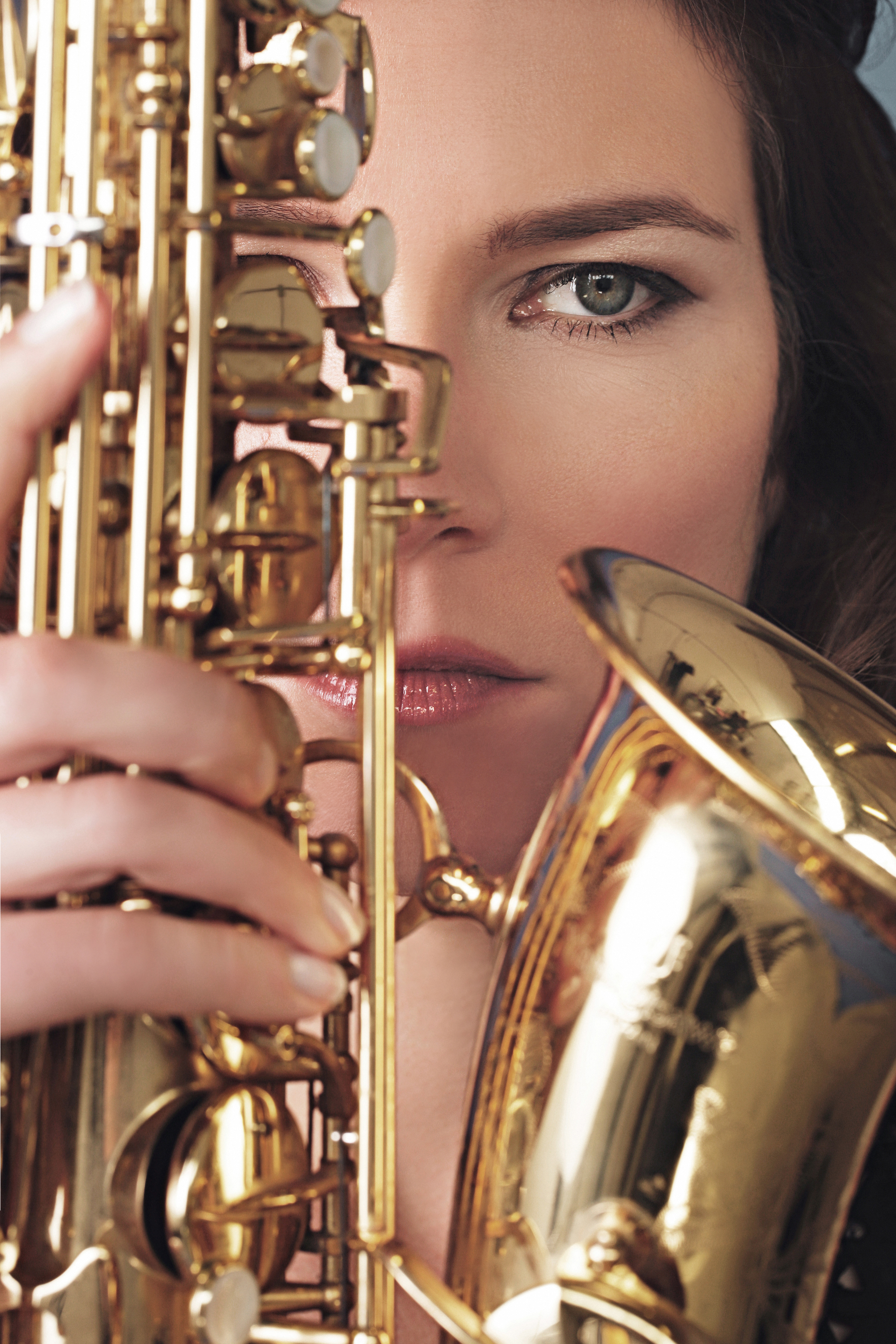
- Susanne Alt in 2015 (photo Michel Zoeter)

Background information
- Born: 15 April 1978 (age 48); Würzburg, West Germany
- Genres: Jazz, funk
- Occupation: Musician
- Instruments: Saxophone, flute
- Years active: 1991–present
- Label: Venus Tunes
- Website: susannealt.com

Susanne Alt (born 1978) is a German jazz saxophone player and composer based in Amsterdam, Netherlands.

== Biography ==
Susanne Alt was born in Würzburg, Germany, in 1978, to Hans-Joachim and Maria Alt. Hans-Joachim is a composer, poet and piano teacher, and Maria is a guitar teacher. After studying classical piano and guitar with her parents, Susanne began playing the saxophone in 1991, and successfully participated in several saxophone competitions. Between 1993 and 1995, while still in high-school, she started taking lessons in classical saxophone at the Meistersingerkonservatorium Nuremberg, and was a full-time student there during the 1995–96 academic year. During this year Susanne began practicing in jazz music, and later that year, after winning the "Siemens-Jazz-Förderpreis" she moved to the Netherlands to continue here studies at the Hilversums Conservatorium. (The school was later merged into the Conservatorium van Amsterdam).

Postgraduate studies brought her back to Germany, where she enrolled in the Berlin University of the Arts in 2000. She formed her own ensemble, the "Susanne Alt Quartet" in 2003, and in the following year released her debut album, Nocturne at Bimhuis, Amsterdam.

After 5 jazz albums Alt released the funk album Saxify in 2016, preceded by the 7-inch single Saxify. The album features 36 musicians, amongst them: Fred Wesley, Michael "Clip" Payne, Michael Hampton, Rodney "Skeet" Curtis, Roger Smith (Tower Of Power). The album received great reviews from various (inter)national sources and is considered her most ambitious work to date.

Alt has collaborated with a number of notable musicians and ensembles. Since 1998, she played with Rosa King, of Soulcatchers, Tribute 2 Bob Marley; BuJazzO, was a member of the Amsterdam Jazz Orchestra, played with Jamal Thomas Band, Fred Wesley and the New J.B.'s. She has also toured worldwide with house DJ's and producers such as Hardsoul Productions, Piglife, Roog, Ronald Molendijk, Marc van Dale and Erick E. For several years now she has also performed with jazz DJ's like Graham B, DJ Maestro, and Wicked Jazz Sounds.

== Discography ==
- Nocturne (Venus Tunes, 2004)
- Delight (Venus Tunes, 2007)
- On Track (Venus Tunes, 2009)
- Live at Bimhuis (Venus Tunes, 2011)
- How to Kiss (Venus Tunes, 2012)
- Saxify (Venus Tunes, 2016)
- Royalty for Real (Venus Tunes, 2024)
- Dark Horse (Venus Tunes, 2026)
