= Stretchin' Out in Bootsy's Rubber Band =

Studio album by Bootsy's Rubber Band
- Released: January 30th, 1976
- Recorded: 1975–1976
- Studios: United Sound Systems, Detroit, Michigan
- Genres: Funk, soul
- Length: 39:43
- Label: Warner Bros.
- Producers: Bootsy Collins, George Clinton

Bootsy's Rubber Band chronology
Stretchin' Out in Bootsy's Rubber Band (1976)	Ahh... The Name Is Bootsy, Baby! (1977)

Singles from Stretchin' Out in Bootsy's Rubber Band
- 1. "Stretchin' Out (In a Rubber Band)" Released: 1976; 2. "I'd Rather Be with You" Released: 1976; 3. "Psychoticbumpschool" Released: 1977

Stretchin' Out in Bootsy's Rubber Band is the first album by American funk and soul band Bootsy's Rubber Band, an offshoot act of Parliament-Funkadelic led by bassist and vocalist William "Bootsy" Collins. It was released on January 30, 1976, on Warner Bros. Records.

== Recording and release ==
Professional ratings
Review scores
Source	Rating
AllMusic	4.5/5 stars
Christgau's Record Guide	B+
The Rolling Stone Record Guide	3/5 stars

The album was recorded around the same time as Parliament's Mothership Connection and Funkadelic's Let's Take It to the Stage at United Sound Systems in Detroit, Michigan. The album was produced by Collins and George Clinton. Collins co-wrote all of the album's seven songs (two with Clinton, one with vocalist Leslyn Bailey and four with Clinton and other band members) and did the arrangements (horn arrangements in collaboration with Fred Wesley).

Stretchin' Out in Bootsy's Rubber Band has been reissued and remastered several times. In 2007, the album was licensed through Rhino Records and reissued through the Collectors Choice Music service.

== Samples ==
"I'd Rather Be with You" has been sampled several times on notable tracks.

- by Childish Gambino on his song "Redbone" from his album "Awaken, My Love!" in 2016.
- by Beyoncé on her song "Be with You" from her 2003 debut album Dangerously in Love.
- by Adina Howard on her hit song "Freak Like Me" from her debut album Do You Wanna Ride? in 1995.
- by Eazy-E on his song "I'd Rather Fuck You" from the final N.W.A. album Niggaz4Life in 1991.
- by Tupac on his song "Ratha Be Ya Nigga" from the last album to be released during his lifetime, All Eyez on Me in 1996.
- by Too Short on the 1996 song Gettin’ It from the album of the same name.

== Track listing ==
No.	Title	Writer(s)	Length
1.	"Stretchin' Out (In a Rubber Band)"	William Collins, George Clinton	6:52
2.	"Psychoticbumpschool"	William Collins, George Clinton, Bernard Worrell, Phelps Collins	5:20
3.	"Another Point of View"	William Collins, George Clinton, Phelps Collins	7:02
4.	"I'd Rather Be with You"	William Collins, George Clinton, Gary Cooper	5:03
5.	"Love Vibes"	William Collins, Leslyn Bailey	4:51
6.	"Physical Love"	William Collins, George Clinton, Gary Cooper, Garry Shider	4:49
7.	"Vanish in Our Sleep"	William Collins, George Clinton	5:46
Total length:			39:51

== Personnel ==
Certain personnel are credited under nicknames on the album sleeve. The full names are given below.

Musicians

- William Collins – bass, guitar, drums, vocals; cowbell on track 1
- Phelps Collins – guitar
- Garry Shider – guitar
- Michael Hampton – guitar
- Gary Cooper – drums, vocals; tambourine on track 1
- Cordell Mosson – drums
- Frank Waddy – drums
- Fred Wesley – trombone
- Maceo Parker – saxophone
- Michael Brecker – saxophone
- Rick Gardner – trumpet
- Randy Brecker – trumpet
- Bernie Worrell – keyboards; melodica on track 4
- Sonny Talbert – keyboards
- Frederick Allen – keyboards
- Leslyn Bailey – vocals
- Robert Johnson – vocals

Production

- William Collins – production, arrangements, horn arrangements
- George Clinton – production
- Fred Wesley – horn arrangements
- Jim Vitti – recording, engineering
- Jim Callon – mixing
- Allen Zentz – mastering
- George Whiteman – photography (cover and liner photos)
- Ed Thrasher – artwork (direction)
- John Van Hamersveld – artwork (design)

== Charts ==
Year	Album	Chart positions	
Year	Album	US	US R&B
1976	Stretchin' Out in Bootsy's Rubber Band	59	10

=== Singles ===
Year	Single	Chart positions		
Year	Single	US	US R&B	US Dance
1976	"I'd Rather Be With You"	—	25	—
1976	"Stretchin' Out (In A Rubber Band)"	—	18	—
1977	"Psychoticbumpschool"	—	69	—
