= Fred Wesley =

American jazz trombonist (born 1943)

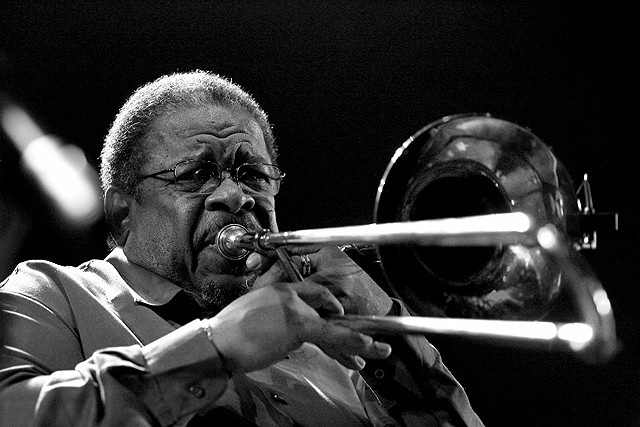
- Wesley in 2007

Background information
- Born: July 4, 1943 (age 83); Columbus, Georgia, U.S.
- Genres: Funk, P-Funk, soul, R&B, soul jazz
- Occupation: Musician
- Instrument: Trombone
- Years active: 1960s–present
- Formerly of: The J.B.'s, Parliament-Funkadelic, Soulive
- Website: www.funkyfredwesley.com

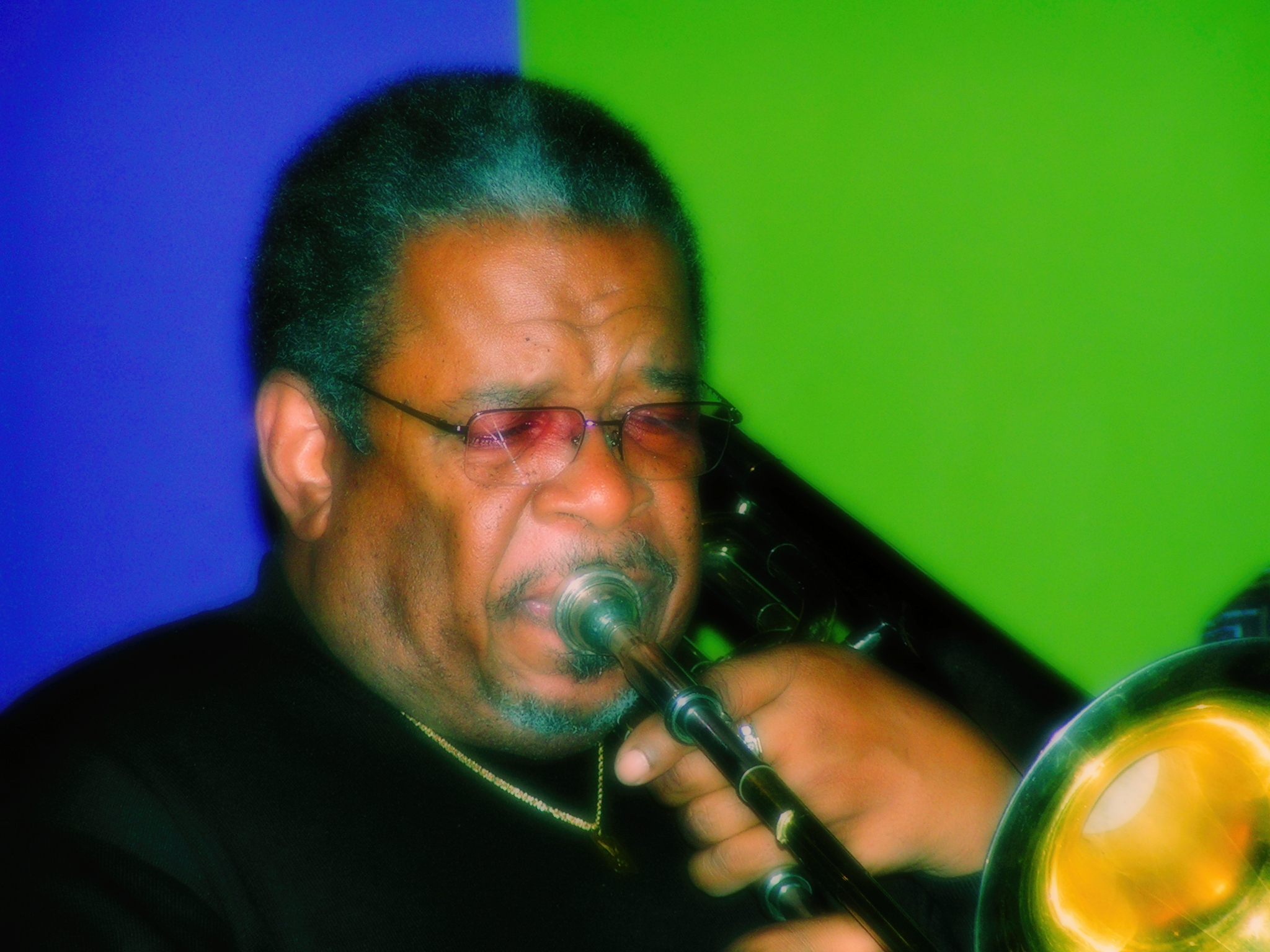
Fred Wesley at Funk n Waffles Bar in Syracuse, NY, March 30, 2007.

Fred Wesley (born July 4, 1943) is an American trombonist who worked with James Brown in the 1960s and 1970s, and Parliament-Funkadelic in the second half of the 1970s.

== Biography ==
Wesley was born the son of a high school teacher and big band leader in Columbus, Georgia, and was raised in Mobile, Alabama. As a child, he took piano and later trumpet lessons. He played baritone horn and trombone in school, and when he was around 12, his father brought a trombone home, whereupon he switched (eventually permanently) to trombone.

During the 1960s and 1970s, he was a pivotal member of James Brown's bands, playing on many hit recordings including "Say it Loud – I'm Black, and I'm Proud," "Mother Popcorn" and co-writing tunes such as "Hot Pants." His slippery riffs and precise solos, complementing those of saxophonist Maceo Parker, gave Brown's R&B, soul, and funk tunes their instrumental punch. In the 1970s, he also was band leader and musical director of Brown's band the J.B.'s, and did much of the group's composing and arranging. His name was credited on 'Fred Wesley & the J.B.'s' recording of "Doing It to Death," which sold over one million copies, and was awarded a gold disc by the R.I.A.A. in July 1973. He left Brown's band in 1975 and spent several years playing with George Clinton's various Parliament-Funkadelic projects, even recording a couple of albums as the leader of a spin-off group, The Horny Horns.

Wesley became a force in jazz in 1978 when he joined the Count Basie Orchestra. He released his first jazz album as a leader, To Someone, in 1988. It was followed by New Friends in 1990, Comme Ci Comme Ca in 1991, the live album Swing and Be Funky, and Amalgamation in 1994.

In the early 1990s, Wesley toured with his colleagues from the James Brown band, Pee Wee Ellis and Maceo Parker, as the JB Horns. With the departure of Ellis, the band became the Maceo Parker Band. Wesley was featured as a trombonist with Parker until 1996 when he formed his own band, The Fred Wesley Group, now known as Fred Wesley and the New JBs.

Wesley recorded an album with San Diego soul-jazz luminaries The Greyboy Allstars in 1994 called West Coast Boogaloo, and toured with the band in 1995, 1996 and again in 2012.

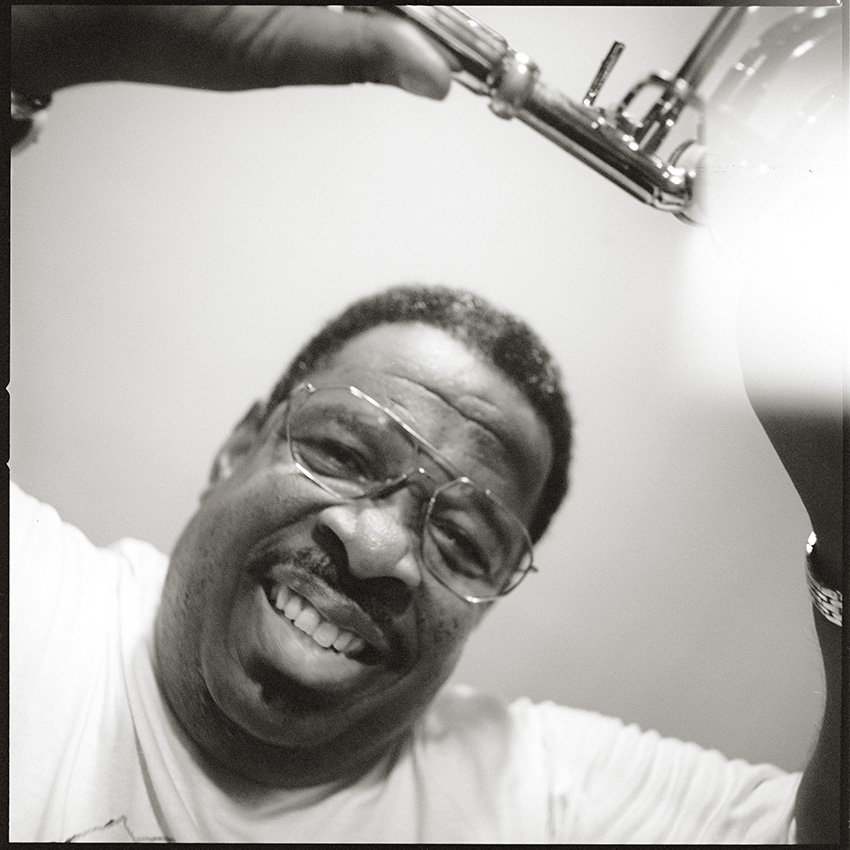
Backstage in Cologne/Germany 1998

Wesley's career includes playing with and arranging for a wide variety of other artists including Ray Charles, Lionel Hampton, Randy Crawford, Vanessa Williams, The SOS Band, Cameo, Van Morrison, Socalled and rappers De La Soul, to name a few. Many other artists have sampled his work. In 2002 Wesley wrote Hit Me, Fred: Recollections of a Sideman, an autobiography about his life as a sideman. Also in 2002 he recorded an album entitled Wuda Cuda Shuda.

Wesley was an adjunct professor in the Jazz Studies department of the School of Music at the University of North Carolina at Greensboro from 2004 to 2006, and now works with students as a visiting artist at numerous other schools, including Berklee College of Music and Columbia College of Chicago. In addition to performing with his own band, he tours as part of a collaboration called Abraham Inc. along with Klezmer artist David Krakauer and Klezmer/hip-hop artist Socalled.

In 2007, Wesley accepted an invitation to contribute to Goin' Home: A Tribute to Fats Domino (Vanguard). He participated with Lenny Kravitz, the Rebirth Brass Band, Troy "Trombone Shorty" Andrews, Pee Wee Ellis and Maceo Parker to contribute their version of Domino's "Whole Lotta Lovin'."

In 2010, Wesley contributed to Kings (Freestyle Records), the fourth album by Israeli funk and groove ensemble the Apples. Specific sessions on the album were dedicated to working with Wesley, one of the group's heroes.

== Discography ==
=== As leader ===
- Damn Right I Am Somebody (1974)
- Breakin' Bread (1975)
- A Blow for Me, a Toot to You (Atlantic, 1977)
- Say Blow by Blow Backwards (Atlantic, 1979)
- House Party (RSO, 1980)
- Blow Your Head (Urban, 1989)
- To Someone (Hi Note, 1990)
- New Friends (Minor Music, 1990)
- Comme Ci Comme Ca (Antilles, 1991)
- Swing & Be Funky (Minor Music, 1993)
- Amalgamation (Minor Music, 1994)
- The Final Blow (Sequel, 1994)
- Full Circle (Victor, 1998)
- Wuda Cuda Shuda (Hip Bop Essence, 2003)
- It Don't Mean a Thing If It Ain't Got That Swing (Sons of Sound, 2006)
- Funk for Your Ass (Columbia, 2008)
- With a Little Help from My Friends (BHM, 2010)
- Studio Live Session (LoEnd, 2018)

=== As sideman ===
With George Benson

- Good King Bad (CTI, 1976)
- Pacific Fire (CTI, 1983)
- Space (CTI, 1978)

With James Brown

- Say It Loud I'm Black and I'm Proud (Polydor, 1969)
- Sex Machine (Polydor, 1970)
- Funky Drummer (King, 1970)
- It's a New Day – Let a Man Come In (King, 1970)
- Hot Pants (Polydor, 1971)
- Love Power Peace (Polydor, 1971)
- Soul Power (Polydor, 1985)
- CD of JB (Polydor, 1985)
- In the Jungle Groove (Polydor, 1986)
- CD of JB II (Polydor, 1987)
- Motherlode (Polydor, 1988)
- Slaughter's Big Rip-Off (P-Vine, 1990)
- Star Time (Polydor, 1991)
- The Payback (Polydor, 1993)
- Get On the Good Foot (Polydor, 1993)
- Revolution of the Mind (Polydor, 1993)
- Hell (Polydor, 1995)
- Reality (Polydor, 1996)
- Funk Power 1970: A Brand New Thang (Polydor, 1996)
- Make It Funky (Polydor, 1996)
- Say It Live and Loud: Live in Dallas 08.26.68 (Polydor, 1998)
- Get On Up The James Brown Story (Polydor, 2014)
- Get Down with James Brown: Live at the Apollo Volume IV (Polydor, 2016)
- Live at Home with His Bad Self (Republic/UMe 2019)
- Live at Home with His Bad Self: The After Show (Republic/UMe 2019)

With George Clinton

- Computer Games (Capitol, 1982)
- You Shouldn't-Nuf Bit Fish (Capitol, 1983)
- R&B Skeletons in the Closet (Capitol, 1986)
- Hey Man...Smell My Finger (Paisley Park, 1993)

With Bootsy Collins

- Stretchin' Out in Bootsy's Rubber Band (Warner Bros., 1976)
- Ahh...the Name Is Bootsy, Baby! (Warner Bros., 1977)
- Bootsy? Player of the Year (Warner Bros., 1978)
- This Boot Is Made for Fonk-N (Warner Bros., 1979)
- Ultra Wave (Warner Bros., 1980)
- F-Encounter (Warner Bros., 1980)
- The One Giveth, the Count Taketh Away (Warner Bros., 1982)
- What's Bootsy Doin'? (Columbia, 1988)
- Jungle Bass (4th & Broadway, 1990)
- Blasters of the Universe (Rykodisc, 1993)
- Fresh Outta 'P' University (Black Culture/(WEA, 1997)
- Live in Louisville 1978 (Disky, 1999)
- Christmas Is 4 Ever (Shout! Factory, 2006)
- Tha Funk Capital of the World (Mascot, 2011)

With Hank Crawford

- Hank Crawford's Back (Kudu, 1976)
- I Hear a Symphony (Kudu, 1975)
- Cajun Sunrise (Kudu, 1978)

With Deee-Lite

- World Clique (Elektra, 1990)
- Infinity Within (Elektra, 1992)
- Sampladelic Relics & Dancefloor Oddities (Elektra, 1996)

With Pee Wee Ellis

- A New Shift (Minor Music, 1996)
- What You Like (Minor Music, 1997)
- Live and Funky (Skip, 2001)
- The Spirit of Christmas (Minor Music, 2013)

With J.B. Horns

- Doing It to Death (1973)
- Pee Wee, Fred & Maceo (Gramavision, 1990)
- Funky Good Time/Live (Tokuma, 1992)
- I Like It Like That (Soulciety, 1993)
- Bring the Funk On Down (ZYX Music, 1999)

With Maceo Parker

- Roots Revisited (Minor Music, 1990)
- For All the King's Men (4th & Broadway, 1990)
- Mo' Roots (Verve, 1990)
- Life on Planet Groove (Minor Music, 1992)
- Horn Riffs for DJ's (Tuff City, 1992)
- Horn Riffs for DJ's Volume 2 (Tuff City, 1993)
- Southern Exposure (Minor Music, 1993)
- Maceo (Minor Music, 1994)
- Funkoverload (ESC, 1998)
- My First Name Is Maceo (Minor Music, 2003)
- Live in Funky Good Time (Sounds of Ordinary Madness, 2008)
- Roots Revisited The Bremen Concert (Minor Music, 2015)
- Life On Planet Groove Revisited (Minor Music, 2018)

With Parlet

- Pleasure Principle (Casablanca, 1978)
- Play Me or Trade Me (Casablanca, 1980)

With Parliament

- Mothership Connection (Casablanca, 1975)
- The Clones of Dr. Funkenstein (Casablanca, 1976)
- Funkentelechy vs. the Placebo Syndrome (Casablanca, 1977)
- Live (Casablanca, 1977)
- Motor Booty Affair (Casablanca, 1978)
- Trombipulation (Casablanca, 1980)
- Tear the Roof Off 1974–1980 (Casablanca, 1993)
- Mothership Connection Newberg Session (P-Vine, 1995)
- Dope Dogs (Fonomusic, 1995)

With Socalled

- Ghettoblaster (Bleu Electric, 2006)
- Peoplewatching (Dare to Care, 2015)

With The S.O.S. Band

- S.O.S. (Tabu, 1980)
- The S.O.S. Band Too (Tabu, 1981)

With Soulive

- Doin' Something (Blue Note, 2001)
- Steady Groovin' (Blue Note, 2005)

With Bernie Worrell

- All the Woo in the World (Arista, 1978)
- Blacktronic Science (Gramavision, 1993)
- Pieces of Woo: The Other Side (CMP, 1993)

With others

- 10,000 Maniacs, Our Time in Eden (Elektra, 1992)
- Gerald Albright, Pushing the Envelope (Heads Up, 2010)
- The Apples, Kings (Freestyle, 2010)
- Susanne Alt, On Track (Venus, 2009)
- Allan Barnes, The Caretaker (Riza, 1986)
- Scott Bomar, Dolemite Is My Name (Netflix/Masterworks/Milan, 2020)
- Bonerama, Live from New York (Mule Train Music, 2004)
- Randy Brecker, 34th N Lex (ESC, 2002)
- The Brides of Funkenstein, Live at the Howard Theatre 1978 (Sequel, 1994)
- Tom Browne, S' Up (Cheetah 2010)
- Vernon Burch, Steppin' Out (Chocolate City 1980)
- Bobby Byrd, Finally Getting Paid (Rhythm Attack, 1988)
- David Byrne, Music for the Knee Plays (ECM, 1985)
- Terry Callier, Turn You to Love (Elektra, 1979)
- Cameo, Machismo (Atlanta Artists, 1988)
- Jean Carn, Trust Me (Motown, 1982)
- Natalie Cole, Dangerous (ATCO, 1985)
- Color Me Badd, Time and Chance (Giant, 1993)
- Carla Cook, Dem Bones (Maxjazz, 2001)
- Randy Crawford, Naked and True (WEA, 1995)
- Brian Culbertson, Brnging Back the Funk (GRP, 2008)
- David Helbock´s Austrian Syndicate (ACT, 2023)
- Dazz Band, On the One (Motown, 1982)
- De La Soul, Buhloone Mindstate (Tommy Boy, 1993)
- Karl Denson, The Bridge (Relaxed, 2002)
- Digital Underground, This Is an E.P. Release (Attic, 1991)
- Dr. John, Creole Moon (Blue Note, 2001)
- Candy Dulfer, What Does It Take (N-Coded, 1999)
- Funkadelic, First Ya Gotta Shake the Gate (C Kunspyruhzy, 2014)
- Gap Band, Gap Band V Jammin' (Total Experience, 1983)
- Earth, Wind & Fire, Faces (ARC/Columbia, 1980)
- Flakes, Flakes I 1980 (Magic Disc, 1980)
- General Caine, Girls (Tabu, 1982)
- Godmoma, Here (Elektra, 1981)
- Larry Goldings, Whatever It Takes (Warner Bros., 1995)
- Gov't Mule, The Deepest End (Evangeline/ATO, 2003)
- Greyboy Allstars, West Coast Boogaloo (Greyboy, 1994)
- Groove Collective, People People Music Music (Savoy, 2005)
- The HeadShakers, Architect Of Funk (SDRM, 2019)
- Michael Henderson, Bedtimes Stories (EMI, 1986)
- Martha High, It's High Time (Diaspora Connections, 2009)
- Hocus Pocus, Place 54 Onandon (Motown, 2007)
- Javon Jackson, Easy Does It (Palmetto, 2003)
- Milt Jackson & Count Basie, Milt Jackson + Count Basie + the Big Band Vol. 1 (Pablo, 1978)
- Milt Jackson & Count Basie, Milt Jackson + Count Basie + the Big Band Vol. 2 (Pablo, 1978)
- Jazzkantine, Heiss & Fettig (RCA, 1995)
- Jonathan Jeremiah, A Solitary Man (Island, 2011)
- Jestofunk, The Remixes (Irma, 1997)
- Jestofunk, Universal Mother (Dance Pool, 1998)
- Nils Landgren, 5000 Miles (ACT, 1999)
- Frankie Lee, Face It! (Demon, 1985)
- Webster Lewis, Let Me Be the One (Epic, 1981)
- Material, The Third Power (Axiom, 1991)
- Marcus Miller, M2 (Telarc, 2001)
- Mop Mop, Isle of Magic (Agogo, 2013)
- Jamie J. Morgan, Walk On the Wild Side (Tabu, 1990)
- Idris Muhammad, House of the Rising Sun (Kudu, 1976)
- Kenny Neal, Walking on Fire (Alligator, 1991)
- New Birth, Platinum City (Ariola, 1979)
- P-Funk All Stars, (Urban Dancefloor Guerillas (CBS, 1983)
- Esther Phillips, For All We Know (Kudu, 1976)
- St. Clair Pinckney, Private Stock (Ichiban 1989)
- Rad, Getting Down Is Free (7 Bridges/P-Vine, 2009)
- Red Hot Chili Peppers, Freaky Styley (EMI, 1985)
- Terry Reid, Seed of Memory (ABC, 1976)
- Oumou Sangare, Seya (World Circuit, 2009)
- Poncho Sanchez, Out of Sight (Concord, Jazz/Elemental Music 2015)
- James Taylor Quartet, Wait a Minute (Polydor, 1988)
- Hans Theessink, Call Me (Blue Groove, 1992)
- The Temptations, Surface Thrills (Motown, 1983)
- Robert Trowers, Point of View (Concord, 1995)
- Phil Upchurch, Whatever Happened to the Blues (Go Jazz, 1992)
- Marva Whitney, Live and Lowdown at the Apollo (King, 1969)
- Larry Williams, That Larry Williams (Fantasy, 1978)
- Lenny Williams, Changing (Rocshire, 1984)
- Vanessa Williams, The Right Stuff (Polydor, 1988)
- Bobby Womack, The Poet II (Beverly Glen Music, 1984)
- Stevie Woods, The Woman in My Life (Ariola, 1982)
- Nanette Workman, Nanette Workman (Pacha 1977)
- Michael Wycoff, Love Conquers All (Big Break, 2008)
- Young Disciples, Road to Freedom (Talkin' Loud, 1991)

== Bibliography ==
- Fred Wesley (2002). Hit Me, Fred: Recollections of a Sideman. Durham: Duke University Press. ISBN 0822329093.
