= Roots Revisited =

Studio album by Maceo Parker
- Released: 1990
- Recorded: 1990
- Studio: A & R Recording, NYC and Ligosa Sound Studios, Cincinnati, Ohio
- Genre: Soul jazz
- Length: 50:34
- Label: Minor Music; MM 1015
- Producer: Stephan Meyner, Maceo Parker

Maceo Parker chronology
For All the King's Men (1989)	Roots Revisited (1990)	Mo' Roots (1991)

Roots Revisited is an album by saxophonist Maceo Parker which was originally released on the Minor Music label in 1990.

== Reception ==
Professional ratings
Review scores
Source	Rating
Allmusic	4/5 stars

The Allmusic review by Scott Yanow stated "Roots Revisited is a throwback to the 1960s soul-jazz style and Maceo Parker gives one the impression that, if called upon, he could hold his own on a bebop date".

== Track listing ==
All compositions by Maceo Parker except where noted

1. "Them That Got" (Ray Charles) – 3:57
2. "Children's World" – 10:49
3. "Better Get Hit In Yo' Soul" (Charles Mingus) – 5:41
4. "People Get Ready" (Curtis Mayfield) – 5:55
5. "Up and Down East Street (for Ulysée Hardy)" – 8:11
6. "Over the Rainbow" (Harold Arlen, Yip Harburg) – 4:14
7. "Jumpin' the Blues" (Jay McShann, Charlie Parker, Walter Brown) – 6:17
8. "In Time" (Sylvester Stewart) – 5:30
9. "Them That Got" [Alternative version] (Charles) – 3:57 Additional track on CD release
10. "Funky Christmas" (Johnny Marks) – 10:09 Additional track on CD release

== Personnel ==
- Maceo Parker – alto saxophone, piano, organ
- Fred Wesley – trombone
- Alfred "Pee Wee" Ellis – tenor saxophone
- Don Pullen – organ (tracks 1–7, 9 & 10)
- Rodney Jones – guitar
- Bill Stewart – drums
- Vince Henry – alto saxophone (track 1)
- Bootsy Collins – bass guitar, guitar
