= The Greatest Romance Ever Sold =

1999 single by Prince

Single by Prince

from the album Rave Un2 the Joy Fantastic
- B-side: "The Greatest Romance Ever Sold" (Adam & Eve Remix)
- Released: October 5, 1999
- Recorded: June 1996 – September 1999
- Studio: Paisley Park, Chanhassen, Minnesota, US
- Genre: Hip hop; soul
- Length: 4:30 (7" edit/single version); 5:32 (album version)
- Label: NPG; Arista
- Songwriter: Prince
- Producer: Prince

Prince singles chronology
"1999" (1998)	"The Greatest Romance Ever Sold" (1999)	"U Make My Sun Shine" (2001)

Music video
- "The Greatest Romance Ever Sold" on YouTube

"The Greatest Romance Ever Sold" is a song recorded by American musician Prince, under his unpronounceable stage name called the "Love Symbol". It was released as the only single from his twenty-third studio album Rave Un2 the Joy Fantastic (1999). It was issued on October 5, 1999, in several different formats, including a 12-inch single, CD single, and a maxi single. Prince solely wrote and produced it, while Mike Scott provided guitar strings for the track. Several music critics found the single reminiscent to the works on his previous studio album, Diamonds and Pearls (1991).

The track is a smooth hip hop and soul ballad, featuring Prince's multi-layered vocals in the chorus. A B-side remix of the single entitled "Adam and Eve", featured a guest rap from Eve, while the Neptunes remix featured a guest rap from Q-Tip. The former version was included on Prince's first remix album, Rave In2 the Joy Fantastic (2001). The single became a minor hit, peaking at number 63 on the Billboard Hot 100. An accompanying music video was created shortly after Rave Un2 the Joy Fantastic became available for purchase.

== Composition and release ==
Musically, "The Greatest Romance Ever Sold" is a smooth hip hop and soul ballad, unlike his previous pop music efforts. It was solely written and produced by Prince himself. The singer uses multi-layered vocals, a deep falsetto, and a downtempo melody throughout its chorus. The album version of the single has a duration of five minutes and twenty-nine seconds, while the radio edit lasts for four minutes and thirty seconds.

Several different physical releases of the single occurred shortly after its release on October 5, 1999, as it was marketed as Prince's "comeback" song. A 12" included eight different versions of the song, including the radio edit, the album version, the "Adam & Eve" remix, plus five additional remixes. The US CD single included the radio edit and Jason Nevins Remix of the track, plus a ten-second "Call Out Research Hook". Also, the Spanish CD single only contained the radio edit of the song.

== Reception ==
=== Critical reception ===
The track was generally well received by music critics. Nathan Rabin of The A.V. Club said "[it] is more Diamonds and Pearls good than Sign O' the Times great." Chuck Taylor, a columnist for Billboard, called the single "entirely satisfying" and appreciated it for being unlike other songs on the radio. Entertainment Weekly's Chris Willman enjoyed the recording's seductiveness and its overall production. Alexis Petridis from The Guardian wrote in his retrospective review, "By the end of the 90s, Prince obviously wanted commercial success again. The album Rave Un2 the Joy Fantastic came packed with guest appearances; the smooth hip-hop-soul balladry of The Greatest Romance Ever Sold was a good indication of its musical style. It wasn't a bad song, but the sense Prince was following trends rather than going his own way was hard to avoid." Toure from Rolling Stone was mixed in his review, stating that it "sound[ed] like [a] refugee from Diamonds and Pearls, the least-great of Prince's great records".

=== Commercial reception ===
After its release, "The Greatest Romance Ever Sold" was moderately successful. The single peaked at number sixty-three on the Billboard Hot 100, becoming Prince's highest-peaking song on the chart since "I Hate U" (1995). The song also fared well on the Hot R&B/Hip-Hop Songs component chart, where it peaked at number twenty-three and lasting a total of twenty weeks on the chart. Elsewhere, the track peaked in the lower regions of several charts. In the United Kingdom, it peaked at position sixty-five, during February 2000. It also charted in Germany and the Netherlands, peaking at numbers seventy-nine and seventy-one, respectively.

== Promotion ==
An accompanying music video for the song was produced and created in late 1999. The visual features the singer performing in a dark room with several other female dancers; for the final segment of the video, Prince stands in front of a bullseye backdrop and a waterfall. In terms of live performances, the singer sang "The Greatest Romance Ever Sold" for his direct to video VHS film Rave Un2 the Year 2000. The aforementioned rendition was recorded live on December 18, 1999, from Paisley Park Studios and aired on PPV on the 31st.

== Track listings and formats ==
US CD single

1. "The Greatest Romance Ever Sold" (Jason Nevins Remix Edit) – 3:36
2. "The Greatest Romance Ever Sold" (Original Radio Edit) – 4:19
3. "The Greatest Romance Ever Sold" (Call Out Research Hook) – 0:10

US vinyl single

- A1 "The Greatest Romance Ever Sold" (Album Version) – 5:30
- A2 "The Greatest Romance Ever Sold" (Radio Edit) – 4:30
- B1 "The Greatest Romance Ever Sold" (Adam & Eve Remix, featuring Eve) – 4:28
- B2 "The Greatest Romance Ever Sold" (Radio Edit, featuring Eve) – 4:32

Spanish CD single

1. "The Greatest Romance Ever Sold" – 4:26

European CD single

1. "The Greatest Romance Ever Sold" (Radio Edit) – 4:30
2. "The Greatest Romance Ever Sold" (The Adam & Eve Remix, featuring Eve) – 4:28

US and European 12" single

- A1 "The Greatest Romance Ever Sold" (Radio Edit) – 4:32
- A2 "The Greatest Romance Ever Sold" (Jason Nevins Romance Beats) – 6:03
- B1 "The Greatest Romance Ever Sold" (Neptunes Extended Edit, featuring Q-Tip) – 5:08
- B2 "The Greatest Romance Ever Sold" (Jason Nevins Remix Edit) – 3:36
- C1 "The Greatest Romance Ever Sold" (Adam & Eve Mix, featuring Eve) – 4:30
- C2 "The Greatest Romance Ever Sold" (Album Version) – 5:29
- D1 "The Greatest Romance Ever Sold" (Jason Nevins Extended Mix) – 6:41
- D2 "The Greatest Romance Ever Sold" (Neptunes Remix Edit, featuring Q-Tip) – 3:42

== Credits and personnel ==
Credits adapted from Rave Un2 the Joy Fantastic liner notes

- Prince – vocals, instruments, lyrics, production
- Eve – guest vocals
- Q-Tip – guest vocals
- Mike Scott – guitar

== Charts ==
Chart performance for "The Greatest Romance Ever Sold"
Chart (1999–2000)	Peak position
Germany (GfK)	79
Netherlands (Dutch Top 40 Tipparade)	21
Netherlands (Single Top 100)	71
Scottish Singles Sales (Official Charts)	75
UK Singles (Official Charts)	65
US Billboard Hot 100	63
US Dance Singles Sales (Billboard)	6
US Hot R&B/Hip-Hop Songs (Billboard)	23

== Samples ==
"The Greatest Romance Ever Sold" (Adam & Eve Mix, featuring Eve) contains a sample from "Flava In Ya Ear"(1994) by Craig Mack
