= All the Woo in the World =

All The Woo In The World

Studio album by Bernie Worrell
- Released: 1979
- Recorded: 1978
- Genre: Funk
- Length: 42:12
- Label: Arista
- Producers: Bernie Worrell, George Clinton

Bernie Worrell chronology
All The Woo In The World (1979)	Funk of Ages (1990)

All The Woo In The World is the debut funk album by Parliament-Funkadelic keyboardist Bernie Worrell, released in 1979 by Arista Records. The album was produced by Bernie Worrell and P-Funk leader George Clinton and features various P-Funk alumni including Garry Shider, Bootsy Collins, Junie Morrison, Billy Bass Nelson, and Eddie Hazel.

The album was reissued in Japan on the P-Vine record label in Japan in 1991 and is sought after by collectors. In October 2011, All the Woo in the World was reissued in the U.S. by the Arista/Get On Down label.

In 1979, the album charted at number 59 on the US R&B charts, while "Insurance Men For The Funk" charted at number 92, on the US R&B singles charts.

== Track listing ==
1. "Woo Together" (George Clinton, J.S. Theracon, Garry Shider, Rodney Curtis) (released as single Arista AS 0422)
2. "I'll Be With You" (Bernie Worrell, J.S. Theracon, Tyrone Lampkin)
3. "Hold On" (Bernie Worrell, George Clinton)
4. "Much Thrust" (Bernie Worrell, George Clinton, Jim Vitti)
5. "Happy To Have (Happiness On Our Side)"
6. "Insurance Man For The Funk" (Bernie Worrell, George Clinton, Bootsy Collins) (released as single Arista AS 0407)
7. "Reprise: Much Thrust"

== Personnel ==
- Bernie Worrell - lead vocals, all keyboards
- Garry Shider, Walter Morrison, George Clinton, Bootsy Collins - additional lead vocals
- Walter Morrison - additional keyboards on "Hold On"
- Garry Shider, Walter Morrison, Eddie Hazel, Glenn Goins, Phelps Collins, Bootsy Collins, Michael Hampton - guitar
- Rodney Curtis, Billy Bass Nelson - bass
- Tyrone Lampkin, Jim Wright, Gary Cooper - drums
- Fred Wesley, Maceo Parker, Richard Griffith, Rick Gardner - horns
- Eli Fontaine - saxophone solo on "Hold On"
- Brides of Funkenstein, Parlet, George Clinton, Bootsy Collins and the voices of the nation - background vocals

Diem Jones - photography and art direction
