= Pee Wee Ellis =

American saxophonist (1941–2021)

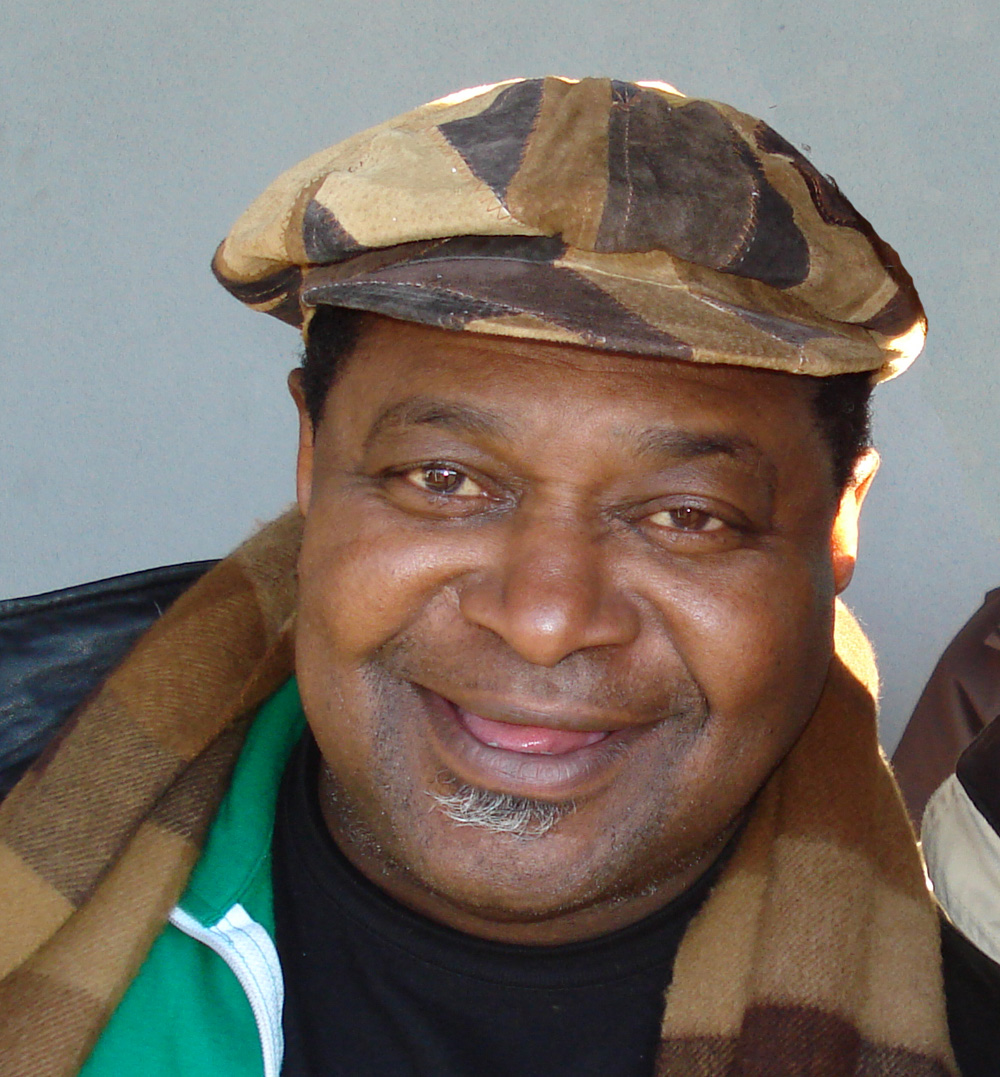
- Ellis in Milan, 2007

Background information
- Also known as: Pee Wee Ellis
- Born: Alfred James Rogers; April 21, 1941; Bradenton, Florida, U.S.
- Died: September 23, 2021 (aged 80) Somerset, England
- Genres: Funk, soul, jazz
- Occupations: Saxophonist, composer, arranger
- Instruments: Tenor, soprano, alto and baritone saxophones, keyboards, flute
- Years active: 1954–2021
- Labels: Skip Records, Minor Music, Gramavision
- Formerly of: The J.B.'s, Ginger Baker's Jazz Confusion, The Dapps

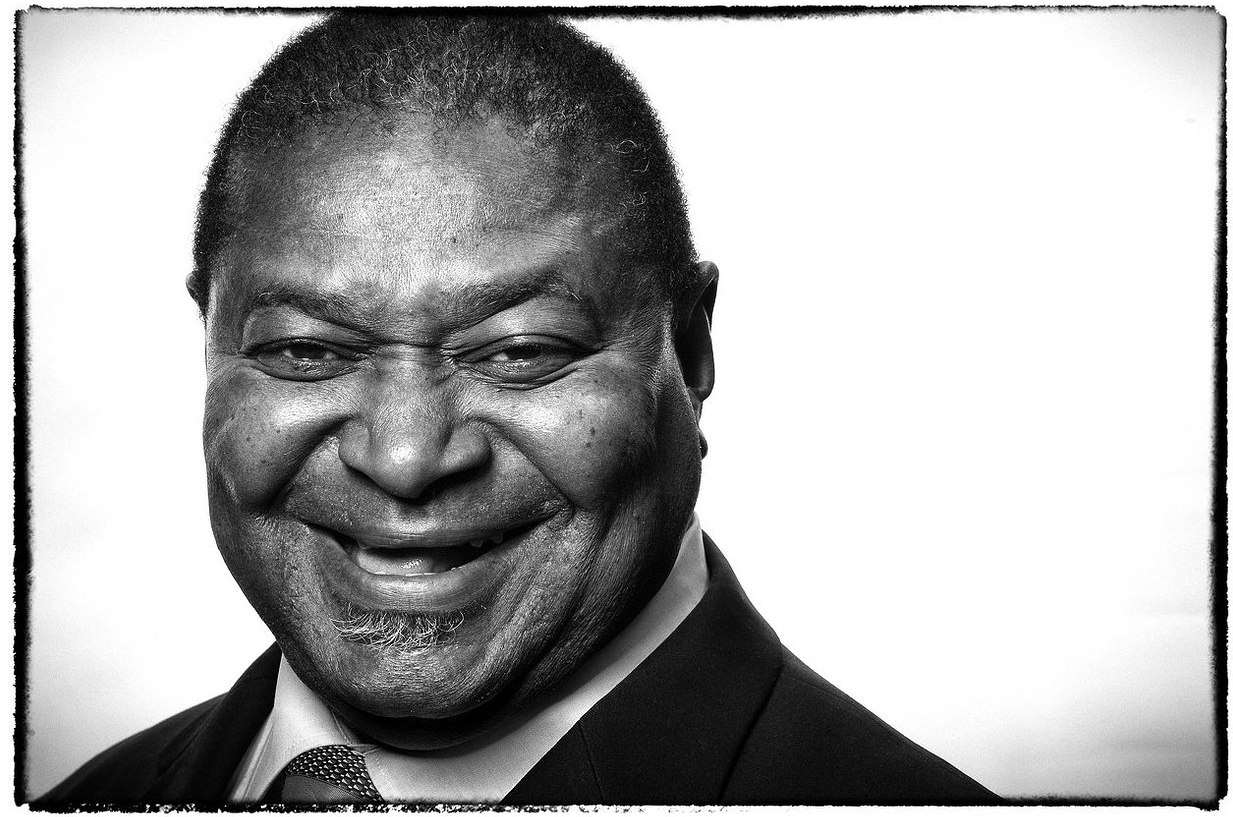
Pee Wee Ellis in 2012

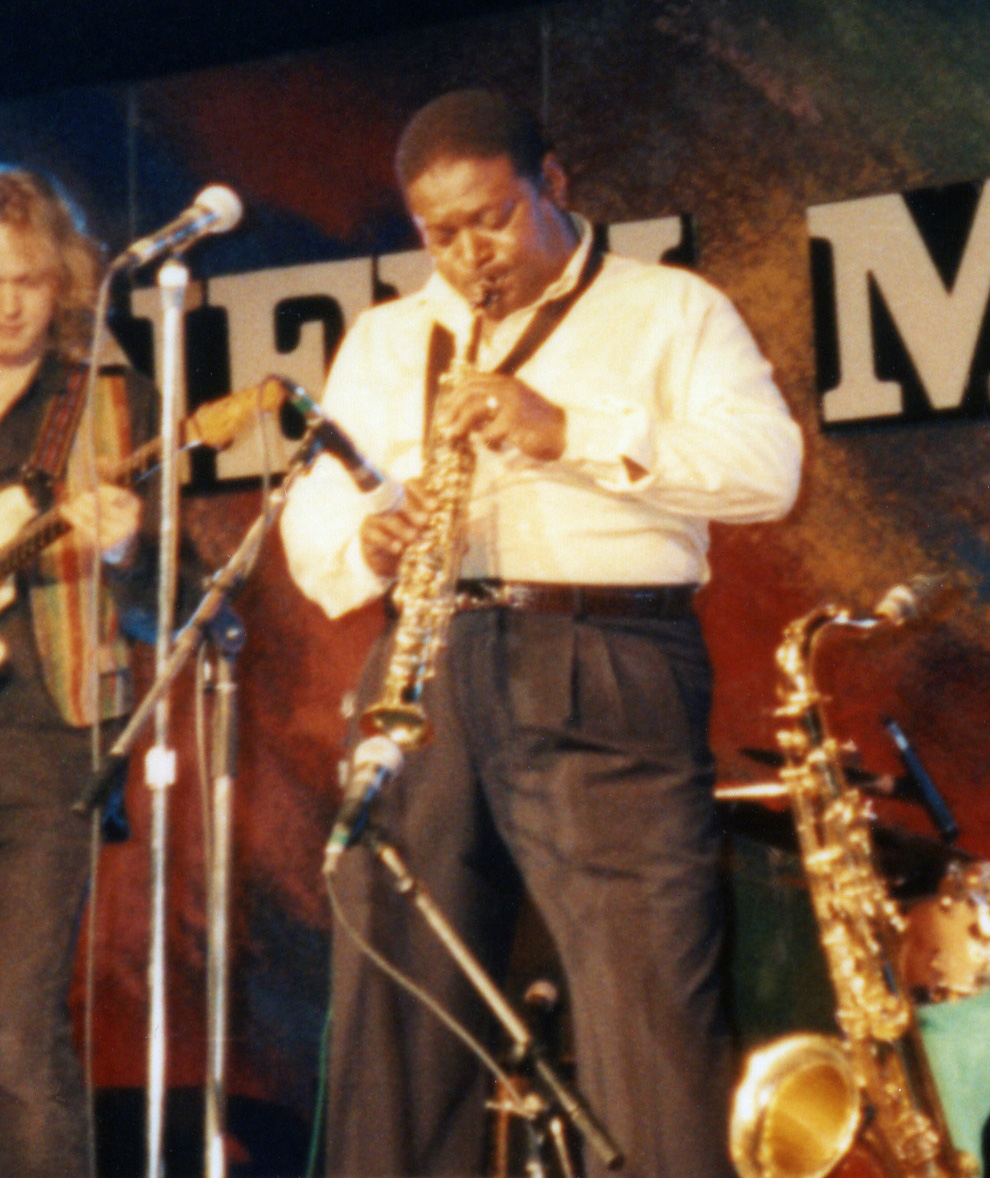
Ellis, with his band Assembly, at the New Morning jazz club, Paris, 1996

Alfred James Rogers (April 21, 1941 – September 23, 2021), known as Pee Wee Ellis due to his diminutive stature, was an American saxophonist, composer, and arranger. With a background in jazz, he was a member of James Brown's band in the 1960s, appearing on many of Brown's recordings and co-writing hits like "Cold Sweat" and "Say It Loud – I'm Black and I'm Proud". He also worked with Van Morrison. Ellis resided in England for the last 30 years of his life.

== Early life ==
Ellis was born on April 21, 1941, in Bradenton, Florida, to his mother Elizabeth and his father Garfield Devoe Rogers, Jr. His father left when he was a young boy, and in 1949, his mother married Ezell Ellis, an organizer of musicians for local dance bands. The family settled in Lubbock, Texas, "a highly segregated town", according to Ellis who gained his nickname "Pee Wee" from musicians staying at the family home. In 1955, a white woman insisted on dancing with his stepfather, but this display of interracial mixing enraged a man watching who stabbed him. Ezell Ellis, an African American, died because a hospital refused to treat him based on the color of his skin. The remaining members of the family moved to Rochester, New York.

Ellis gave his first public performance in 1954 at Dunbar Junior High School. While attending Madison High School he played professionally with jazz musicians including Ron Carter and Chuck Mangione. In 1957, while visiting a saxophone repair shop on Broadway, he met Sonny Rollins and asked him for saxophone lessons. Sonny agreed to teach him weekly, requiring Ellis to fly to New York City from Rochester in order to do so. The round fare for the flight was 55 dollars, and he was earning 90 dollars a week from playing in a local club called the Pythodd Room, so decided it was worth the investment. He went on to attend Manhattan School of Music, where he honed his skills in Jazz. In 1960 he moved back to Florida working as a bandleader, musical director and writer.

== Association with James Brown ==
At the invitation of a friend, trumpeter Waymon Reed, Ellis joined the James Brown Revue in 1965. He worked with Brown until 1969, co-writing 26 songs with him. He joined as an alto saxophonist, later switching to tenor and became Brown's music director within two years. Ellis said in 2015 that his "jazz influence" merged with Brown's R&B background to create funk. The songs they wrote together included the hits "Cold Sweat" (1967) and "Say It Loud - I'm Black and I'm Proud" (1968); Ellis arranged both. "Say It Loud" was intended as a response to the assassination of Martin Luther King. It became a new anthem for African Americans. This song gained a new lease of life after the George Floyd murder and Black Lives Matter protests in 2020, with a 15,740 percent jump in the streaming of the song in one week.

Ellis told Martin Chilton, writing for the London Independent in 2020, about the response to the song: "In two weeks, it was like it had swept across the country. We were doing three shows a day at The Apollo and people queued around the block every day for every show. " Credited as a pioneer of funk, Ellis told an interviewer from Jazzwise magazine in the same year" "it was a music that heralded a new attitude; a new and distinctive black culture, of street culture finding confidence and popularity outside and alongside the establishment."

== Later career ==
In 1969, he returned to New York City. He worked as an arranger and musical director for CTI Records' Kudu label, collaborating with artists like George Benson, Hank Crawford and Esther Phillips. In the late 1970s, he moved to San Francisco and formed a band with former Miles Davis sideman David Liebman, with whom he recorded "The Chicken", that was to become a favourite of Jaco Pastorius.

The trumpeter Mark Isham asked Ellis to perform on a track for Van Morrison. He wrote a funky arrangement of "You Make Me Feel So Free" for Morrison leading to his involvement in creating all of the tracks on Into the Music (1979). An association between the two musicians endured. He toured with Morrison many times and recorded another dozen albums with him over the next 20 years. Until 1986, he worked with Morrison's band as an arranger and musical director and then again from 1995 through 1999. He also gave occasional performances in 1988, 1989, 1991, 1992, 1993, 1994, 2000, 2002, 2005 and 2006 as guest appearances.

In the late 1980s, Ellis regrouped with some musicians he worked with during his time with James Brown to form the JB Horns. With Fred Wesley and Maceo Parker he recorded albums that defined a version of jazz-funk. The group also toured in Europe. In 1992 he resumed his solo recording career. Ellis also appeared alongside Bobby Byrd in the J.B. All Stars.

In 1995, showing the diversity of his musical interests and talents, Ellis played tenor sax and arranged the horns for the album Worotan, by Mali's Oumou Sangare, the so-called "Songbird of Wassoulou" and worked with many other artists on the World Circuit label including Ali Farka Toure, Cheikh Lo, Anga Diaz and renowned Cuban bassist Cachao.

His own group The Pee Wee Ellis Assembly continued to work consistently from 1992, and Ellis and guested with multi various artists, arranging and recording both his own albums and as a respected session player and teaching.

Between 2009 and 2011, Ellis toured an African tribute to James Brown, "Still Black Still Proud", to much acclaim in the U.S. and Europe. Special guests in the project included Vusi Mahlasela, Maceo Parker, Cheikh Lo, Mahotella Queens and Ghanaian rapper Ty.

From 2012, Ellis toured with the Ginger Baker Jazz Confusion, a quartet comprising Ellis, drummer Ginger Baker, bassist Alec Dankworth and percussionist Abass Dodoo.

In July 2014, Pee Wee Ellis was honored with a doctorate by Bath Spa University, and he continued to support local music as patron (and a principal performer) of the Bristol International Blues and Jazz Festival. He died on September 23, 2021, at the age of 80.

== In popular culture ==
Ellis was played by rapper Black Thought (credited as Tariq Trotter) in the 2014 biographical film Get on Up about James Brown.

== Discography ==
=== Solo recordings ===
- 1977 Home in the Country (Savoy)
- 1992 Blues Mission (Gramavision)
- 1993 Twelve and More Blues (Minor Music)
- 1994 Sepia Tonality (Minor Music)
- 1995 Yellin Blue
- 1996 A New Shift (Minor Music)
- 1997 What You Like (Minor Music)
- 2000 Ridin Mighty High (Skip Records)
- 2001 Live and Funky (Skip Records)
- 2005 Different Rooms (Skip Records)
- 2011 Tenoration (Art of Groove, MIG-Music)
- 2013 The Spirit of Christmas (Minor Music GmbH)
- 2015 The Cologne Concerts (Minor Music GmbH)
- 2018 In My Ellingtonian Mood (Minor Music GmbH)
- 2024 The Storyteller (Rhythm ‚n‘ Flow Records)

=== With James Brown ===
- 1969 The Popcorn(King)
- Star Time - a four-CD retrospective of James Brown's career

=== With Van Morrison ===
- 1979 Into the Music (Polydor)
- 1980 Common One (Polydor)
- 1982 Beautiful Vision (Polydor)
- 1983 Inarticulate Speech of the Heart (Polydor)
- 1984 Live at the Grand Opera House Belfast (Polydor)
- 1985 A Sense of Wonder (Polydor)
- 1995 Days Like This (Polydor)
- 1996 How Long Has This Been Going On (Mercury) - Top Jazz Album - #1
- 1996 Tell Me Something: The Songs of Mose Allison (Verve) - Top Jazz Album - #1
- 1997 The Healing Game (Mercury)
- 1998 The Philosopher's Stone (Polydor)
- 1999 Back on Top (Polydor)
- 2006 Live at Montreux 1980/1974 DVD (Exile) - (Pee Wee Ellis is featured prominently in the 1980 performance with solos, especially standing out as the "twin brother" to Morrison's vocals on "Troubadours" and "Summertime in England".)

=== With The JB Horns ===
- 1990 Finally Getting Paid (Minor Music)
- 1991 Pee Wee, Fred and Maceo (Gramavision)
- 1993 Funky Good Time - Live (Gramavision)
- 1994 I Like It Like That

=== With Maceo Parker ===
- 1990 Roots Revisited (Minor Music)
- 1991 Mo' Roots (Minor Music)
- 1992 Life on Planet Groove (Minor Music)
- 1993 Southern Exposure (Minor Music)
- 1994 Maceo (Minor Music)

=== Other contributions ===
With Ginger Baker

- Why? (Motema Music, 2014)

With Brass Fever

- Time Is Running Out (Impulse!, 1976)

With George Benson

- Body Talk (CTI Records|CTI, 1973)

With Hank Crawford

- It's a Funky Thing to Do (Cotillion, 1971)

With Dave Liebman

- Light'n Up, Please! (Horizon, 1977)

With Jack McDuff

- The Fourth Dimension (Cadet, 1974)
- Magnetic Feel (Cadet, 1975)

With the Rebirth Brass Band, Troy "Trombone Shorty" Andrews, Fred Wesley, Maceo Parker and Lenny Kravitz

- "Whole Lotta Lovin'" on Goin' Home: A Tribute to Fats Domino (Vanguard, 2007)

With Shirley Scott

- Mystical Lady (Cadet, 1971)

With Sonny Stitt

- Dumpy Mama (Flying Dutchman, 1975)

With Leon Thomas

- Blues and the Soulful Truth (Flying Dutchman, 1972)
- Full Circle (Flying Dutchman, 1973)

With Ali Farka Touré

- Savane (World Circuit, 2006)

== See also ==
- List of jazz arrangers
- List of saxophonists
