= Rave Un2 the Year 2000 =

- Cover of the original VHS release
- Directed by: Geoff Wonfor
- Written by: Prince
- Produced by: NPG Music Club
- Starring: Prince; Larry Graham; The Time; Rosie Gaines; George Clinton; Maceo Parker; Lenny Kravitz
- Music by: Prince
- Distributed by: NPG Video
- Release date: June 5, 2000
- Running time: 113 minutes
- Language: English

Rave Un2 the Year 2000 is a 1999 Prince concert film.

Filmed in December 1999 at Paisley Park Studios, and premiering as a pay-per-view special via In Demand on December 31, 1999, the film was produced as a companion to his recently released album Rave Un2 the Joy Fantastic. The concert featured performances of songs from the album, other Prince hits (including a ceremonial "retirement" of "1999"), as well as covers of other songs. Special guests included former band associates Rosie Gaines and Morris Day, funk legends Maceo Parker and members of The Family Stone such as bass player Larry Graham, as well as funk-rock performer Lenny Kravitz. The concert would be Prince’s final release while going by the unpronounceable symbol, widely known as the “Love Symbol”, that he would use as his stage name from 1993 to 2000. In June 2019, in honor of what would have been Prince's 61st birthday, the concert was broadcast by PBS.

== Track listing ==
1. "Let's Go Crazy"
2. "She's Always in My Hair"
3. "U Got the Look"
4. "Kiss"
5. "Jungle Love" (Morris Day and the Time)
6. "The Bird" (Morris Day and the Time)
7. "American Woman" (Lenny Kravitz)
8. "Fly Away" (Lenny Kravitz)
9. "Gett Off"
10. Medley (Rosie Gaines, Mike Scott, Maceo Parker)
11. "It's Alright"
12. "Everyday People" (Cynthia Robinson, Jerry Martini)
13. "Higher"
14. "Purple Rain"
15. "The Christ" (retitled version of "The Cross")
16. Blues Medley (Maceo Parker, Johnny Blackshire)
17. "Nothing Compares 2 U"
18. "Take Me with U"/"Raspberry Beret" (with Mr. Happy instrumental coda)
19. "The Greatest Romance Ever Sold"
20. "Baby Knows"
21. "1999" sample intro
22. "Baby I'm a Star"
23. "1999"
