= Mo' Roots (Maceo Parker album) =

Mo'Roots

Studio album by Maceo Parker
- Released: 1991
- Recorded: March 1991
- Studio: Sound on Sound, New York
- Genre: Soul, jazz
- Length: 1:03:46
- Label: Verve
- Producer: Stephan Meyner, Maceo Parker

Maceo Parker chronology
Roots Revisited (1990)	Mo'Roots (1991)	Life on Planet Groove (1992)

Mo'Roots is an album by the American saxophonist Maceo Parker, released in 1991. It peaked at No. 4 on Billboard's Traditional Jazz Albums chart.

== Production ==
Mo' Roots was produced by Stephan Meyner and Parker. Fred Wesley and Pee Wee Ellis played on the album. "Sister Sadie" is a cover of the Horace Silver song.

== Critical reception ==
Professional ratings
Review scores
Source	Rating
AllMusic	4.5/5 stars
Calgary Herald	A
Chicago Tribune	3.5/4 stars
Windsor Star	B+

The Chicago Tribune determined that "there's enough variety to keep things interesting, but enough clarity of musical direction to make it all hang together and, more important, make Parker feel at home with the material." The Washington Post wrote: "From Dixieland to hard bop to R&B, from Lionel Hampton to Ray Charles to Marvin Gaye to Otis Redding to Maceo himself, it's all here, underscored by an unfussy and decidedly funky rhythm section and enlivened by a now legendary horn triumvirate."

== Track listing ==
No.	Title	Writer(s)	Length
1.	"Hallelujah, I Love Her So"	Ray Charles	3:58
2.	"Chicken"	Alfred Ellis	8:19
3.	"Let's Get It On"	Marvin Gaye, Ed Townsend	7:46
4.	"Hamp's Boogie Woogie"	Lionel Hampton, Milt Buckner	6:16
5.	"Fa Fa Fa (The Sad Song)"	Otis Redding, Steve Cropper	4:50
6.	"Jack's Back"	Fred Wesley	5:42
7.	"Sister Sadie"	Horace Silver	5:27
8.	"Daddy's Home"		6:02
9.	"Down by the Riverside"		6:36
10.	"Southwick"	Maceo Parker
Total length:			63:46

== Personnel ==
- Maceo Parker – alto saxophone
- Bill Stewart – drums
- Rodney Jones – guitar
- Larry Goldings – Hammond organ
- Pee Wee Ellis – tenor saxophone
- Fred Wesley – trombone
- Jimmy Madison – drums on "Fa Fa Fa (The Sad Song)"
- Kym Mazelle, Maceo Parker – vocals on "Fa Fa Fa (The Sad Song)"
- Steve Williamson – alto saxophone on "Jack's Back"

Technical

- Achim Kröpsch – cover photography
