= Life on Planet Groove =

Live album by Maceo Parker
- Released: 1992
- Recorded: March 5–7, 1992
- Venues: Stadtgarten, Cologne
- Genres: Jazz; funk; soul
- Length: 74:10
- Labels: Minor Music; Verve
- Producers: Maceo Parker; Stephan Meyner

Maceo Parker chronology
Mo' Roots (1991)	Life on Planet Groove (1992)	Southern Exposure (1993)

Life on Planet Groove is a live album by Maceo Parker, released in 1992. It was recorded in concert at the club Stadtgarten in Cologne, Germany.

The album peaked at No. 3 on the Billboard Jazz Albums chart.

== Critical reception ==
Professional ratings
Review scores
Source	Rating
AllMusic	4/5 stars
Calgary Herald	B
The Encyclopedia of Popular Music	3/5 stars
Entertainment Weekly	B
The Philadelphia Inquirer	3/4 stars

Entertainment Weekly wrote that the "live session’s gracefully fermented, pre-hip-hop mode of funk-making hits home." The Calgary Herald thought that "with Maceo, Life On Planet Groove is a carefree existence where spirits are imbued with physical jive, bodies do the 'mashed potato' and ears revel in generous amounts of harmonious horns, slathered with Motown vocals and topped with psychedelic bass."

== Track listing ==
All tracks composed by Maceo Parker; except where indicated

1. "Shake Everything You've Got" (16:39)
2. "Pass the Peas" (James Brown, John Starks, Charles Bobbit) (11:26)
3. "I Got You (I Feel Good)" (James Brown) (3:45)
4. "Got to Get U" (7:08)
5. "Addictive Love" (The Winans, Keith Thomas) (8:58)
6. "Children's World" (6:21)
7. "Georgia on My Mind" (Hoagy Carmichael, Stuart Gorrell) (7:23)
8. "Soul Power 92" (James Brown, Maceo Parker, Bootsy Collins) (14:12)

== Personnel ==
- Maceo Parker – alto saxophone, vocals
- Candy Dulfer – alto saxophone
- Larry Goldings – Hammond organ
- Vincent Henry – bass, alto saxophone
- Rodney Jones – guitar
- Pee Wee Ellis – flute, tenor saxophone, vocals
- Kym Mazelle – vocals
- Kenwood Dennard – drums
- Fred Wesley – trombone, vocals
