= Funk Overload =

Album by Maceo Parker

Studio album by Maceo Parker
- Released: August 1998
- Recorded: February 1998
- Studios: Dan's House of Love, New York City
- Genres: Funk; R&B; soul; jazz
- Labels: What Are Records?, Cream
- Producers: Daniel Wise, Maceo Parker

Maceo Parker chronology
Maceo (1994)	Funk Overload (1998)	Dial: M-A-C-E-O (2000)

Funk Overload is an album by Maceo Parker, released in 1998 via What Are Records? and Cream Records.

The album peaked at No. 43 on the Billboard Jazz Albums chart.

== Critical reception ==
Professional ratings
Review scores
Source	Rating
AllMusic	4/5 stars
The Encyclopedia of Popular Music	2/5 stars

AllMusic wrote that "though Maceo's original lyrical attempts may be a bit immature, his years of experience and hard work shine through with every brassy attack and smooth soul note." The Washington Post thought that Parker's son, Corey, "emerges as an entertaining rapper." Billboard called the album "a hot, entertaining, straight-up R&B record that contains soulful originals and covers."

== Track listing ==
All tracks composed by Maceo Parker except where indicated

1. "Uptown Up" (Maceo Parker, Corey Parker)
2. "Sing a Simple Song" (Sylvester Stewart)
3. "Maceo's Groove" (Maceo Parker, Corey Parker)
4. "Elephant's Foot"
5. "Let's Get It On" (Marvin Gaye, Ed Townsend)
6. "Tell Me Something Good" (Stevie Wonder)
7. "Youth of the World"
8. "We're on the Move"
9. "Inner City Blues" (Marvin Gaye, James Nyx Jr.)
10. "Do You Love Me" (Maceo Parker, Michael Rucska)
11. "Going in Circles" (Jerry Peters, Anita Poree)

== Personnel ==
- Maceo Parker – alto saxophone, percussion, vocals
- Ron Tooley – trumpet
- Fred Wesley – trombone
- Vincent Henry – tenor saxophone
- Will Boulware – Hammond B3 organ
- Bruno Speight, Steve Conte (track 6) – guitar
- Jerry Preston – bass
- Jamal Thomas – drums
- Diann Sorrell, Kara Dio Guardi, "Sweet" Charles Sherrell, Jerry Preston – backing vocals
- Corey Parker – rap (tracks 1,3,5)
