= Made by Maceo =

Studio album by Maceo Parker
- Released: February 25, 2003
- Recorded: October – November 2002
- Genre: R&B
- Label: What Are?/Esc/Sony International
- Producer: Maceo Parker, Joachim Becker

Made by Maceo is a 2003 album by Maceo Parker.

== Track listing ==
All tracks composed by Maceo Parker; except where indicated

1. "Come By and See"
2. "Off the Hook"
3. "Hats Off to Harry"
4. "Quick Step
5. "Those Girls" (Music: Parker, Lyrics: Corey Parker)
6. "Moonlight in Vermont" (John Blackburn, Karl Suessdorf)
7. "Lady Luck" (Lloyd Price, Harold Logan)
8. "Don't Say Goodnight"
9. "Once You get Started"
10. "Those Girls" (instrumental)
11. "Lady Luck Reprise" (Lloyd Price, Harold Logan)

== Personnel ==
- Maceo Parker - vocals, percussion, alto saxophone
- Candy Dulfer - alto saxophone
- Vincent Henry - tenor saxophone
- Will Boulware - keyboards
- Greg Boyer - trombone
- Rodney Curtis - bass
- Bruno Speight - guitar
- Jamal Thomas - drums
- Ron Tooley - trumpet
- Corey Parker - vocals
- Cynthia Johnson, Giorge Pettus, Carrie Harrington - background vocals
