= Maceo Parker =

American saxophonist and composer (born 1943)

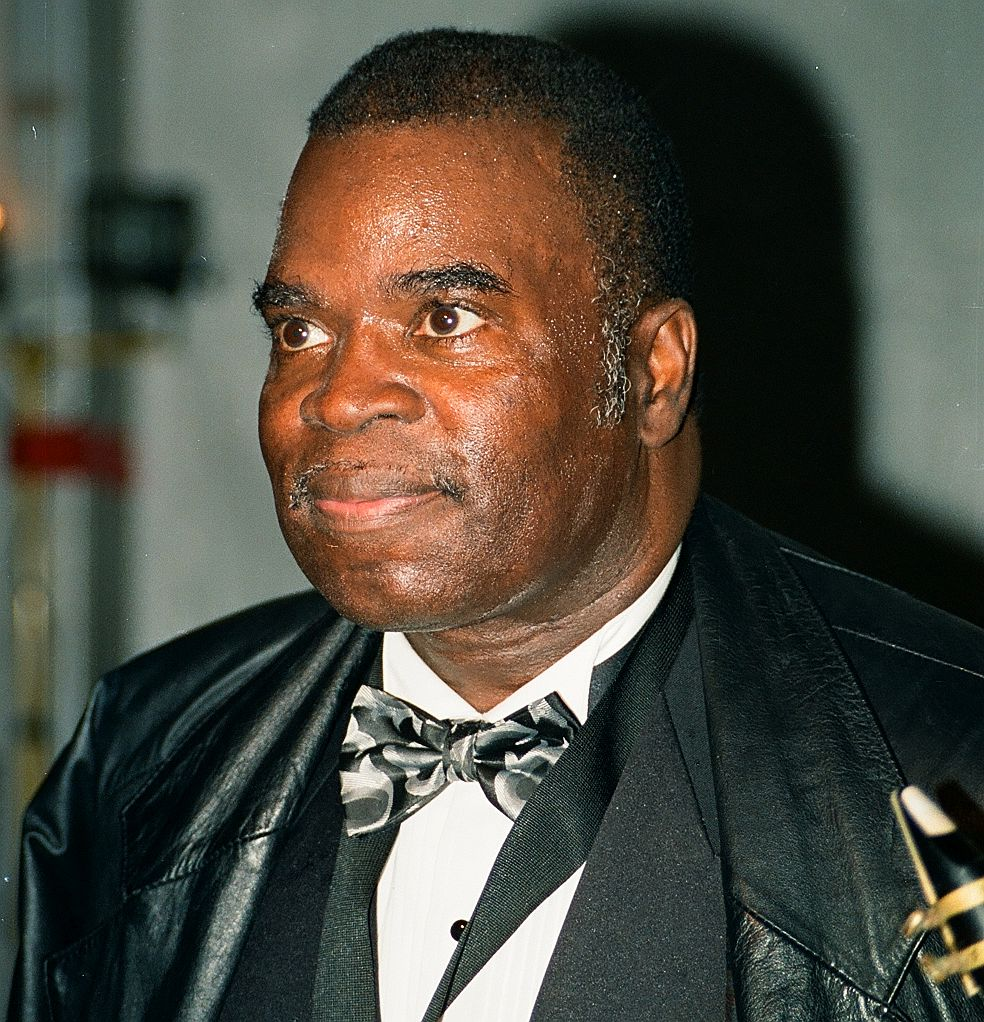
- Parker in 1997

Background information
- Born: February 14, 1943 (age 83); Kinston, North Carolina, United States
- Occupations: Musician, band leader
- Instruments: Saxophone, flute, piano, vocals
- Years active: c.1962–2020
- Labels: Verve, What Are Records?, Heads Up Minor Music
- Website: www.maceo.com

Maceo Parker (/ˈmeɪsioʊ/; born February 14, 1943) is an American funk and soul jazz saxophonist, best known for his work with James Brown in the 1960s, Parliament-Funkadelic in the 1970s and Prince in the 2000s. Parker was a prominent soloist on many of Brown's hit recordings, and a key part of his band, playing alto, tenor and baritone saxophones. Since the early 1990s, he has toured under his own name.

== Biography ==
Parker was born in Kinston, North Carolina, United States. Parker's father played piano and drums in addition to singing in church with Parker's mother; his brother Melvin played drums and his brother Kellis played the trombone. Parker and his brother Melvin joined James Brown in 1963; in his autobiography, Brown claims that he originally wanted Melvin as his drummer, but agreed to additionally take Maceo under his wing as part of the deal. In March 1970, Parker, his brother Melvin, and a few of Brown's band members left to establish the band Maceo & All the King's Men, which toured for two years.

In January 1973, Parker rejoined James Brown's group. He also charted a single "Parrty – Part I" (No. 71 pop singles) with Maceo & the Macks that year. In 1975, Parker and some of Brown's band members, including Fred Wesley, left to join George Clinton's band Parliament-Funkadelic. Parker once again re-joined James Brown from 1984 to 1988.

In the 1990s, Parker began a solo career. His first album of this period Roots Revisited spent 10 weeks at the top of the Billboard Contemporary Jazz Charts. To date he has released 11 solo albums since 1990. Parker's 1992 live album, Life on Planet Groove, is considered to be his seminal live album, marking his first collaboration with Dutch saxophonist Candy Dulfer.

In 1993, Parker made guest appearances on hip hop group De La Soul's album Buhloone Mindstate. In the late 1990s, Parker began contributing semi-regularly to recordings by Prince and accompanying his band, The New Power Generation, on tour. He also played on the Jane's Addiction track "My Cat's Name Is Maceo" for their 1997 compilation album Kettle Whistle. In 1998, Parker performed as a guest on "What Would You Say" on a Dave Matthews Band concert, which also became one of their live albums, Live in Chicago 12.19.98.

In 2004, Parker toured as a part of Prince's band for the "Musicology Live 2004ever" tour and again in 2007 he performed as part of Prince's band for Prince's 21 nights at the O2 arena. Parker also played as part of Prince's band for his 21-night stay at LA's Forum in 2011.

In 2008, Maceo Parker closed the Edmonton International Jazz Festival at Urban Lounge.

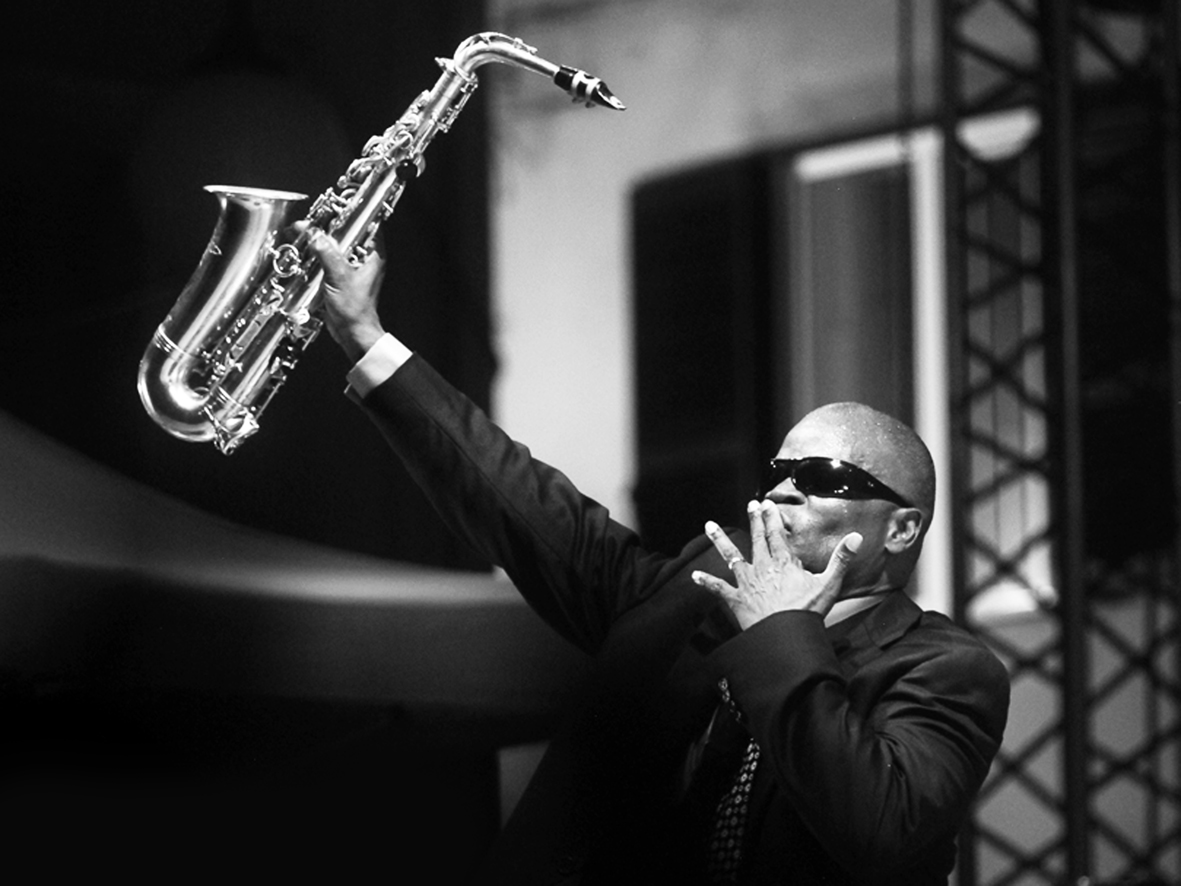
Maceo Parker at the Liri Blues Festival, Italy, in 2009

Parker's album Roots & Grooves with the WDR Big Band is a tribute to Ray Charles, whom Parker cites as one of his most important influences. The album won a Jammie for best Jazz Album in 2009. Parker followed this up with another collaboration with WDR Big Band in 2012 with the album Soul Classics.

In October 2011, Parker was honored with induction into the North Carolina Music Hall of Fame.

In July 2012, Parker was the recipient of a Lifetime Achievement Award from Victoires Du Jazz in Paris. He continues touring, headlining many jazz festivals in Europe and doing as many as 290 concerts a year.

In May 2016, Parker received The North Carolina Heritage Award from his home state.

Parker toured with the Ray Charles Orchestra and the Raelettes performing a tribute to Ray Charles at major festivals worldwide, including Monterey Jazz Festival in 2016 and Playboy Jazz Festival in 2019.

== Book and media ==
In February 2013, Maceo Parker published his autobiography, 98% Funky Stuff: My Life in Music with the publisher Chicago Review Press.

Parker was portrayed by Craig Robinson in the 2014 James Brown biopic Get on Up.

== Equipment ==
Maceo plays a gold-plated Selmer Mark VI alto saxophone and the mouthpiece he uses is a No. 3 Brilhart Ebolin. Maceo's reed of choice is the Vandoren Java, 3.5 gauge.

== Tributes ==
Maceo, the restaurant in the 1st arrondissement of Paris opened in 1997 by Mark Williamson, is named for Parker.

== Discography ==
=== As bandleader ===
Credits for Maceo Parker as band leader
| Year | Credited as | Album | Label |
|---|---|---|---|
| 1970 | Maceo & All the King's Men | Doing Their Own Thing | House of the Fox / Charly Records |
| 1972 | Maceo & All the King's Men | Funky Music Machine | Excello |
| 1974 | Maceo | Us | People / P-Vine |
| 1989 | Maceo Parker | For All the King's Men | 4th & Broadway |
| 1990 | Maceo Parker | Roots Revisited | Verve / Minor Music |
| 1991 | Maceo Parker | Mo' Roots | Verve / Minor Music |
| 1992 | Maceo Parker | Life on Planet Groove | Verve / Minor Music |
| 1993 | Maceo Parker | Southern Exposure | Jive / Novus / Minor Music |
| 1994 | Maceo Parker | Maceo (Soundtrack) | Minor Music |
| 1998 | Maceo Parker | Funk Overload | What Are Records? / ESC |
| 2000 | Maceo Parker | Dial: M-A-C-E-O | What Are Records? / ESC |
| 2003 | Maceo Parker | Made by Maceo | What Are Records? / ESC |
| 2005 | Maceo Parker | School's In! | BHM Productions |
| 2007 | Maceo Parker | Roots & Grooves | Intuition / Heads Up |
| 2012 | Maceo Parker | Soul Classics | Listen2 Entertainment / Razor & Tie |
| 2018 | Maceo Parker | Life On Planet Groove - Revisited | Verve / Minor Music |
| 2018 | Maceo Parker | It's All About Love | Leopard |
| 2020 | Maceo Parker | Soul Food: Cooking With Maceo | Mascot Label Group / The Funk Garage |

=== As sideman ===
Credits for Maceo Parker as a sideman
| Year | Artist | Album | Label |
|---|---|---|---|
| 1964 | James Brown | Out of Sight | PolyGram |
| 1969 | James Brown | Say It Loud, I'm Black and I'm Proud | Polydor / Umgd |
| 1970 | James Brown | Sex Machine | Polydor / Umgd |
| 1972 | James Brown | Get on the Good Foot | PolyGram |
| 1972 | Johnny Hammond | The Prophet | Kudu |
| 1973 | James Brown | The Payback | Polydor / Umgd |
| 1974 | James Brown | Hell | Polydor / Umgd |
| 1975 | James Brown | Reality | PolyGram |
| 1976 | Bootsy Collins | Stretchin' Out in Bootsy's Rubber Band | Warner Bros. |
| 1976 | Parliament | The Clones of Dr. Funkenstein | Island / Mercury |
| 1975 | Parliament | Mothership Connection | Island / Mercury |
| 1977 | Bootsy Collins | Ahh... The Name Is Bootsy, Baby! | Warner Bros. |
| 1977 | Parliament | Live: P-Funk Earth Tour | Island / Mercury |
| 1977 | Parliament | Funkentelechy Vs. the Placebo Syndrome | Island / Mercury |
| 1977 | Fred Wesley | A Blow for Me, A Toot for You | Atlantic |
| 1978 | Parliament | Motor Booty Affair | Island / Mercury |
| 1978 | Bernie Worrell | All the Woo in the World | Arista |
| 1979 | Bootsy Collins | This Boot Is Made for Fonk-N | Warner Bros. |
| 1979 | Parliament | Gloryhallastoopid | MCA |
| 1980 | Bootsy Collins | Ultra Wave | Warner Bros. |
| 1980 | Parliament | Trombipulation | PolyGram |
| 1983 | P-Funk All Stars | Urban Dancefloor Guerillas | Sony |
| 1983 | George Clinton | You Shouldn't-Nuf Bit Fish | Capitol |
| 1985 | George Clinton | Some of My Best Jokes Are Friends | Capitol |
| 1985 | Red Hot Chili Peppers | Freaky Styley | EMI |
| 1986 | James Brown | Gravity | Volcano |
| 1986 | James Brown | James In the Jungle Groove | Polydor / Umgd |
| 1986 | Ryuichi Sakamoto | Futurista | |
| 1987 | Mico Wave | Cookin' from the Inside Out!!! | Columbia |
| 1987 | Yvonne Jackson | I'm Trouble | Ichiban |
| 1988 | James Brown | James Brown's Funky People, Pt. 2 | Polydor / Umgd |
| 1988 | Bootsy Collins | What's Bootsy Doin'? | Sony |
| 1988 | Keith Richards | Talk Is Cheap | EMI |
| 1989 | Criminal Element Orchestra | Locked Up | Atlantic |
| 1990 | Various Artists | Gramavision 10th Anniversary Sampler | Gramavision |
| 1990 | Deee-Lite | World Clique | Elektra / Wea |
| 1990 | Living Colour | Time's Up | Sony |
| 1990 | P-Funk All Stars | Live at the Beverly Theatre in Hollywood | Westbound |
| 1990 | Fred Wesley | New Friends | PolyGram |
| 1990 | Rev. Billy C. Wirtz | Backslider's Tractor Pull | HighTone |
| 1991 | James Brown | Messing with the Blues | PolyGram |
| 1991 | Material | The Third Power | Axiom |
| 1991 | Bernie Worrell | Funk of Ages | Rhino |
| 1991 | Kenny Neal | Walking on Fire | Alligator |
| 1991 | Various Artists | House Party 2 | MCA |
| 1992 | Bachir Attar | The Next Dream | CMP |
| 1992 | 10,000 Maniacs | Our Time in Eden | Elektra / Wea |
| 1992 | Deee-Lite | Infinity Within | Elektra / Wea |
| 1993 | Various Artists | The Best Jazz Is Played with Verve | PolyGram |
| 1993 | George Clinton | "P" Is the Funk | AEM |
| 1993 | Candy Dulfer | Sax-A-Go-Go | Sony |
| 1993 | Color Me Badd | Time and Chance | Warner Bros. |
| 1993 | Bernie Worrell | Blacktronic Science | Gramavision |
| 1993 | Bryan Ferry | Taxi | Warner Bros. |
| 1993 | Various Artists | Manifestation: Axiom Collection II | PolyGram |
| 1993 | James Brown | Soul Pride: The Instrumentals (1960–1969) | PolyGram |
| 1993 | De La Soul | Buhloone Mindstate | Rhino |
| 1993 | Hans Theessink | Call Me | Deluge |
| 1993 | Dave Koz | Lucky Man | Capitol |
| 1993 | George Clinton | Plush Funk | Aem |
| 1993 | Bernie Worrell | Blacktronic Science | Gramavision |
| 1994 | Bootsy Collins | Blasters of the Universe | Rykodisc |
| 1994 | Pedro Abrunhosa | Viagens | PolyGram |
| 1994 | Bryan Ferry | Mamouna | Virgin |
| 1994 | Nils Landgren Funk Unit | Live in Stockholm | Red Horn |
| 1992 | The JB Horns | I Like It Like That | Soulciety |
| 1995 | Parliament | The Best of Parliament: Give Up the Funk | PolyGram |
| 1995 | Fred Wesley | Say Blow by Blow Backwards | Aem |
| 1995 | Larry Goldings | Whatever It Takes | Warner Bros. |
| 1995 | Brooklyn Funk Essentials | Cool And Steady And Easy | Groovetown Records |
| 1995 | Various Artists | Back to Basics, Vol. 2 | Instinct |
| 1996 | James Brown | Foundations Of Funk: A Brand New Bag | Polydor / Umgd |
| 1996 | Various Artists | Little Magic in a Noisy World | Act |
| 1996 | Various Artists | A Celebration of Blues: The New Breed | Celeb. of Blues |
| 1997 | Various Artists | Booming on Pluto: Electro for Droids | Ambient |
| 1997 | Kenny Neal | Deluxe Edition | Alligator |
| 1997 | Phil Upchurch | Whatever Happened to the Blues | Go Jazz |
| 1999 | Ani DiFranco | To The Teeth | Righteous Babe Records |
| 1999 | Prince | Rave Un2 The Joy Fantastic | NPG |
| 2001 | Dave Matthews Band | Live in Chicago 12.19.98 | RCA |
| 2001 | Ani DiFranco | Revelling/Reckoning | Righteous Babe Records |
| 2002 | Prince and The New Power Generation | One Nite Alone... Live! | NPG |
| 2002 | Prince and The New Power Generation | One Nite Alone... the aftershow: it ain't over! | NPG |
| 2003 | Prince and The New Power Generation | C-Note | NPG |
| 2004 | Prince | Musicology | NPG / Columbia |
| 2006 | Prince | 3121 | NPG / Universal |
| 2007 | Prince | Planet Earth | NPG / Columbia |
| 2007 | Various Artists | Goin' Home: A Tribute to Fats Domino | Vanguard |
| 2008 | Prince | Indigo Nights | NPG |
| 2009 | Prince | Lotusflower | NPG |

== Filmography ==
Film credits for Maceo Parker
| Year | Artist | Album | Label |
|---|---|---|---|
| 2000 | Prince | Rave Un2 the Year 2000 | NPG Music Club |
| 2002 | Maceo Parker | Roots Revisited | Arthaus Musik |
| 2003 | Prince | Live at the Aladdin Las Vegas | NPG Music Club |
| 2004 | Maceo Parker | My First Name Is Maceo | Minor Music |
