= Jaco Pastorius discography =

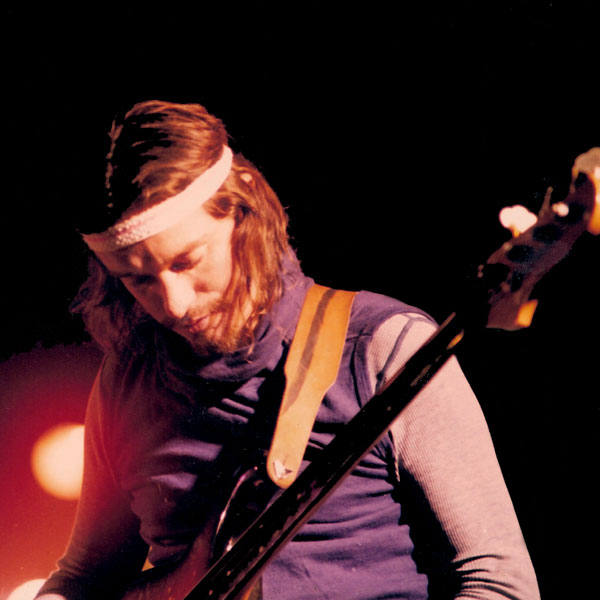
Jaco Pastorius performing live in Bologna, Italy in 1986

This is the discography of Jaco Pastorius (1951–1987), excluding bootlegs and compilations.

== Discography ==
=== As leader/co-leader ===
- 1974: Jaco with Pat Metheny, Bruce Ditmas, Paul Bley (Improvising Artists, 1976) – live
- 1975: Jaco Pastorius (Epic, 1976)
- 1980–81: Word of Mouth (Warner Bros., 1981)
- 1982: Invitation (Warner Bros., 1983) – live
- 1986: Stuttgart Aria with Biréli Lagrène (Jazzpoint/Le Chant du Monde, 1986)

Posthumous releases

- Honestly - Solo Live (Jazzpoint, 1991) – recorded in 1986
- Holiday for Pans (Sound Hills, 1993) – recorded in 1980–82
- The Birthday Concert (Warner Bros., 1995) – recorded in 1981
- Golden Roads (Sound Hills, 1997) – recorded in 1986
- A Good Stitch for Golden Roads (Sound Hills, 1997) – recorded in 1986
- Punk Jazz: The Jaco Pastorius Anthology (Warner Bros./Rhino, 2003) [2CD] – recorded in 1968–86
- The Early Years Recordings (Holiday Park, 2006) – recorded in 1969–74
- Trio of Doom with John McLaughlin and Tony Williams (Columbia, 2007) – recorded in 1979
- Legendary Demo & Live Tracks (Victor, 2008) – recorded in 1970, 1974, 1976, and 1982
- Word of Mouth Band featuring Kazumi Watanabe, Word of Mouth Band 1983 Japan Tour (Rhino, 2012) [2CD] – recorded in 1983
- Modern American Music...Period! The Criteria Sessions (Omnivore Recordings, 2014) – recorded in 1974
- Truth, Liberty & Soul (Resonance, 2017) – live recorded in 1982
- Jaco Pastorius Bass Workshop: Jazz Concert In Martinique (Altus Jazz, 2017) – live recorded in 1984
- Tokyo 83 (2019) - Recorded at Koseinenkin Kaikan, Tokyo, Japan on May 22, 1983

=== As group ===
Weather Report

- 1975–76: Black Market (Columbia, 1976)
- 1976–77: Heavy Weather (Columbia, 1977)
- 1978: Mr. Gone (Columbia, 1978)
- 1979: 8:30 (Columbia, 1979)
- 1980: Night Passage (Columbia, 1980)
- 1981: Weather Report (Columbia, 1982)

Posthumous compilations

- Live and Unreleased (Columbia, 2002) [2CD]
- Forecast: Tomorrow (Columbia, 2006) [3CD & DVD-Video]
- The Legendary Live Tapes: 1978-1981 (Columbia, 2015) [4CD]

Trio of Doom
With Tony Williams and John McLaughlin

- Trio of Doom (Columbia Legacy, 2007) – recorded in 1979. posthumous release.

=== As sideman/guest ===
With Randy Bernsen

- Music for Planets, People & Washing Machines (Amc, 1984) – 2 tracks
- Mo' Wasabi (Zebra, 1986) – 3 tracks
- Paradise Citizens (Zebra, 1988) – 1 track

With Herbie Hancock

- Sunlight (Columbia, 1978) – 1 track
- Mr. Hands (Columbia, 1980) – 1 track

With Brian Melvin

- 1984–85: Brian Melvin’s Nightfood, Night Food (Timeless, 1985)
- 1985: Brian Melvin’s Nightfood, Jazz in Toulouse (Atlus, 2016) [2CD]
- 1985: Brian Melvin Trio, Standards Zone (Global Pacific, 1990)
- 1984–86 Brian Melvin’s Nightfood, Nightfood (Global Pacific, 1988) – different from 1985 album with similar title
- 1986: Brian Melvin Trio, Jazz Street (Timeless, 1988)

With Joni Mitchell

- 1976: Hejira (Asylum, 1976)
- 1977: Don Juan's Reckless Daughter (Asylum, 1977)
- 1978–79: Mingus (Asylum, 1979)
- 1979: Shadows and Light (Asylum, 1980) – live

With others

- Manolo Badrena, Manolo (A&M, 1979)
- Little Beaver, Party Down (Cat, 1974) – recorded in 1974
- Jimmy Cliff, Cliff Hanger (CBS, 1985) – 1 track
- Cockrell & Santos, New Beginnings (A&M, 1978)
- Michel Colombier, Michel Colombier (Chrysalis, 1979)
- Deadline, Down by Law (Celluloid, 1985)
- Ian Hunter, All American Alien Boy (Columbia, 1976)
- Albert Mangelsdorff, Trilogue - Live! (MPS, 1977) – recorded in 1976
- Al Di Meola, Land of the Midnight Sun (Columbia, 1976) – recorded in 1975
- Pat Metheny, Bright Size Life (ECM, 1976) – recorded in 1975
- Bob Mintzer, Source (Agharta, 1982)
- Airto Moreira, I'm Fine, How Are You? (Warner Bros., 1977)
- Michel Polnareff, Coucou Me Revoilou (Atlantic, 1978)
- Flora Purim, Everyday, Everynight (Warner Bros., 1978)
- Tom Scott, Intimate Strangers (Columbia, 1978)
- Mike Stern, Upside Downside (Atlantic, 1986) – 1 track
- Tommy Strand, Tommy Strand and The Upper Hand, Featuring Jaco Pastorius (Holiday Park, 2009) – recorded in 1971
- Ira Sullivan, Ira Sullivan (Horizon, 1976) – recorded in 1975–76
- Various artists, Havana Jam 2 (Columbia, 1979) [2LP] – 3 tracks
- Various artists, Conrad Sivert Presents Jazz at the Opera House (CBS/Sony, 1983) [2LP] – recorded in 1982

=== Soundtracks ===
- Various artists, including Jaco Pastorius, Jaco (Original Soundtrack) (Columbia, 2015) – posthumous compilation for the 2014 documentary film Jaco on Pastorius' life and musical career
