= Holiday for Pans =

Studio album by Jaco Pastorius
- Released: 1993
- Recorded: 1980–1982
- Studios: Power Station, New York City; KCC, New York City; Jingle, New York City
- Genres: Jazz fusion, steel drum
- Length: 56:23
- Labels: Warner Bros. Records (rejected); Sound Hills (Japan)
- Producers: Jaco Pastorius; Peter Yianilos

Holiday for Pans is a posthumous studio album by jazz fusion bassist Jaco Pastorius. Recorded between 1980 and 1982 at several New York City studios, the album was intended to be Pastorius' third solo album (following 1981's Word of Mouth).

Pastorius' record label Warner Bros. refused to release the album on the basis that it was "extremely esoteric": Pastorius was well-known as a bass guitar prodigy, yet Holiday for Pans was largely a showcase for steel drum performances by longtime collaborator Othello Molineaux. The album also features contributions from Pastorius' Weather Report bandmates Wayne Shorter and Don Alias, harmonica virtuoso Toots Thielemans, as well as orchestration from the Los Angeles Philharmonic Orchestra.

Pastorius spent the last several years of his life searching for a label to release Holiday for Pans, to no avail. At the time of the bassist's death in 1987, the tapes were left in the possession of engineer Kenny Jackel. Against the wishes of the Pastorius family, Jackel sold the recordings to Japanese record label Sound Hills, which released the album in 1993. To date, the album remains unreleased in the United States, although the website of the Pastorius estate now appears to recognize the album. The Penguin Guide to Jazz has labeled the recording "by far the most imaginative project Pastorius ever undertook."

== Recording ==
The sessions for Holiday for Pans took place between 1980 and 1982 in at least three New York City recording studios: The Power Station, KCC Studio, and Jingle Studio. The sessions were produced by Pastorius and Peter Yianilos. The album serves to highlight the steel drum playing of Othello Molineaux, who had become associated with Pastorius shortly after the musician relocated to New York in the mid-1970s. Molineaux performed on many of Pastorius' albums, including his self-titled album, Word of Mouth, Twins and Invitation. Molineaux is now credited as one of the first steel drum artists to break ground in the American jazz scene.

There are disputing accounts regarding the status of Holiday for Pans, with some sources claiming that the record is no more than crude demo tapes, or that it was possibly intended as an Othello Molineaux solo album (with Pastorius' name to be attached as a producer and collaborator). However, Bill Milkowski's 1995 biography of Pastorius clearly asserts that the musician intended Holiday for Pans to be his third solo album, and tried in vain for most of the 1980s to secure a release for the record.

In addition to the steel drum work of Molineaux, the recording features Wayne Shorter on "Elegant People" (also written by Shorter). "Mysterious Mountain" was written by Alan Hovhaness, and features orchestration from the Los Angeles Philharmonic. Other covers include The Beatles' "She's Leaving Home" and John Coltrane's "Giant Steps". The title track is a play on the David Rose song "Holiday for Strings". Holiday for Pans also includes three Pastorius originals: "Good Morning Anya", "City of Angels", and "Birth of Island".

== Rejection by Warner Bros. ==
Holiday for Pans was intended as a follow-up to Pastorius' 1981 Warner Bros. release Word of Mouth. However, Word of Mouth garnered lukewarm sales, cooling his relationship with the company. In addition, Pastorius' behavior became increasingly erratic as the 1980s moved forward, due to a combination of the musician's undiagnosed bipolar disorder and a growing substance abuse problem. His actions began to concern those who worked for Warner Bros., concert promoters, as well as the musicians with whom he performed.

Ricky Schultz, one of the record executives responsible for signing Jaco to Warner Bros., stated that the label was "expecting something more in the commercial fusion genre, like Return to Forever or something along the lines of Weather Report's Mr. Gone. But Holiday for Pans was extremely esoteric — it was basically a vehicle for Othello Molineaux that Jaco had produced. It wasn't very well received by the powers at the label." To recoup their losses on the project, Warner Bros. instead released Invitation in 1983, a live album composed primarily of cover songs.

== Search for new label ==
During a May 1983 interview for Guitar World, a scattered Pastorius mentioned his excitement over the project: "I have a record you will not believe: Holiday for Pans, which I adapted from David Rose's "Holiday for Strings" and arranged for Othello Molineaux, the steel drum player who's with me on Word of Mouth." In the same interview, he made the dubious claim that he had funded the recordings himself, stating, "...I have about twenty-four master tapes that I paid for myself."

Following the rejection by Warner Bros., the Holiday for Pans project laid dormant for approximately four years. For some period of time, the master tapes were stranded in a friend's van, which had been impounded in a New Jersey tow-yard. In 1986, during a 17-week stay at Bellevue Hospital, Pastorius began obsessing over the tapes, believing that they were the key to his comeback. After securing a day-pass release from Bellevue, Pastorius mixed down Holiday for Pans at "a small jingle studio on the Upper East Side," with Kenny Jackel engineering. Pastorius left the master tapes in Jackel's possession, instructing him: "Don't give them up to anybody except me." The tapes remained in a closet at Jackel's studio for several years.

During the final months of his life, Pastorius attempted to shop Holiday for Pans around to various labels. He instructed writer and friend Bill Milkowski to dub cassettes of the rough mixes created at Jackel's studio for submission to different record companies. Ultimately, Pastorius was unsuccessful in finding another label to release Holiday for Pans. While he still guested on various releases during the mid-1980s, Pastorius' behavior and deteriorated professional relationships prevented him from securing another record contract before his death in 1987.

== Japanese release ==
In 1993, Billboard reported that the head of Japanese label Sound Hills Records (owned by distribution company Super Stop) paid cash for the Holiday for Pans master tapes; Sound Hills released the album in Japan on April 26, 1993. The label would go on to press Holiday for Pans several more times over the years: as The Full Complete Sessions 3-CD set in 1999 (featuring several outtakes), and again as The Comprehensive Brand New Edition in 2001 (featuring one outtake).

The Billboard article notes that the family was joined by Molineaux and Yianilos in pursuing legal action to recover the master tapes, and had requested the FBI's assistance in banning import or sale of the Sounds Hill pressing of Holiday for Pans within the United States.

However, on his website, Othello Molineaux collaborator Rich Lamanna noted that engineer Terry James had spoken to him about the Holiday for Pans recordings: "Mr. Jackel tried very hard to bring the tapes back to the family and was rejected every time as the project owed money to about four different studios who were not going to release the tapes without being paid. No musicians were ever added to replace Jaco... What happened after the tapes went to Japan was just a case of lousy mixing."

== Reception ==
In their 1994 review, The Penguin Guide to Jazz gave the record four stars, labeling it "an oddity, but a rather marvelous one. The imaginative use of steel drums is a throw-back to the bassist's Florida upbringing." They ended by saying that although Holiday for Pans is "idiosyncratic in the extreme, it's by far the most imaginative project Pastorius ever undertook." In 1999, The Virgin Encyclopedia of Jazz also gave Holiday for Pans a four-star review. Writing for The Rough Guide to Jazz in 2004, Ian Carr selected Holiday for Pans as one of three touchstone recordings by Pastorius that readers should seek out. Carr describes the album as "Pastorius in collaboration with Michael Gibbs and an ensemble which includes the great Toots Thielemans, in a joyfully creative orchestral deployment of West Indian steel drums."

Not all reviews were as warm. In their 1994 review, Gramophone called the title track "a rather ghastly reworking of 'Holiday for Strings.'"

== Legacy ==
In 2003, "Good Morning Anya", was included on the Warner Bros./Rhino Records compilation Punk Jazz: The Jaco Pastorius anthology, a collection that brought "together rarities, live tracks, and material recorded for several different labels"; the release marked the first time any music from Holiday for Pans was released in an official capacity.

The 1993 pressing of Holiday for Pans is now recognized on Jaco Pastorius' official website.

== Track listing ==
No.	Title	Writer(s)	Length
1.	"Mysterious Mountain"	Alan Hovhaness	1:32
2.	"Elegant People"	Shorter	6:44
3.	"Good Morning Anya"	Pastorius	5:31
4.	"She's Leaving Home"	Lennon, McCartney	3:34
5.	"Holiday For Pans (based on "Holiday for Strings")"	Rose	3:13
6.	"Giant Steps"	J. Coltrane	3:12
7.	"City of Angels"	Pastorius	8:53
8.	"Birth of Island"	Pastorius	23:44
Total length:			56:23

== Personnel ==
Credits as listed in the 1993 Sound Hills CD release and The Penguin Guide to Jazz:

- Jaco Pastorius – Bass, steel drums (bass pan), percussion, keyboards, vocals
- Othello Molineaux – Steel drums

Additional musicians

- Don Alias – Percussion
- Trompa Choier – Choir
- Kenwood Dennard – Drums
- Bobby Economou – Drums, percussion
- Mike Gerber – Piano
- Michael Gibbs – Orchestration
- Peter Graves – Trombone
- Ted Lewand – Guitar
- Wayne Shorter – Saxophone
- Craig Thayler – Violin
- Toots Thielemans – Harmonica
- Leroy Williams – Steel drums
