= Popcorn (disambiguation) =

Popcorn, or pop corn, is a variety of corn kernel, which forcefully expands and puffs up when heated.

Popcorn, or pop corn, may also refer to:

== Geography ==
- Popcorn, Indiana, United States

== People ==
- Faith Popcorn (born 1943), futurist
- Marvin Sutton (1946–2009), American Appalachian moonshiner known as "Popcorn"
- Richard "Popcorn" Wylie (1939–2008), American R&B musician, songwriter and record producer

== Arts, entertainment, and media ==
=== Films ===
- Popcorn (1991 film), a horror film
- Pop Corn (2003 film), a Tamil drama film
- Popcorn (2007 film), a teen comedy
- Popcorn (2023 film), an Indian Telugu-language film
- Popcorn, a 1969 music documentary directed by Peter Clifton

=== Literature ===
- Popcorn (novel), a 1996 novel by Ben Elton
  - Popcorn (play), a 1998 adaptation of Elton's novel

=== Music ===
- Popcorn (Romanian music style), a dance music subgenre established in Romania in the late 2000s
- Popcorn (Belgian music style), a music subculture and style originally established in Belgium, and based on dancing to R&B and pop records

==== Albums and box sets ====
- Popcorn (Arashi album), 2012
- Popcorn (Luiz Henrique and Walter Wanderley album), 1967
- Popcorn, an album by Tammie Brown
- Popcorn, an album by Moonstar88
- Popcorn, a box set by The Cocktails
- The Popcorn (album), an album by James Brown
- Popcorn (EP), an EP by Federica Carta

==== Songs ====
- "Popcorn" (instrumental), a 1969 composition by Gershon Kingsley, covered by Hot Butter in 1972 and several other artists
- "Popcorn", a song by American musician Kovas from The Arrogance of Youth 2008
- "The Popcorn", a 1969 instrumental by James Brown
- "Popcorn", a song recorded by Mrs. Mills

=== Other arts, entertainment, and media ===
- "Popcorn", a 1983 episode of the American TV sitcom Silver Spoons
- Popcorn (Italian TV series) Italian pop music show 1980–1985
- Popcorn (American TV series), an American children's variety show
- PopCorn (video game), a 1989 breakout clone (sub-class of the "bat-and-ball" videogame genre)
- "Popcorn", a poem by Raffi from his 1979 album The Corner Grocery Store

== Computing and technology ==
- POPCORN (767-2676), a phoneword used in parts of the United States to reach the speaking clock or local time & temperature information
- Popcorn Time, a multi-platform open-source Bittorrent-based streaming media player
- popcorn.js, an open source JavaScript and HTML5 media framework

== Enterprises ==
- Popcorn.net, a movie download service
- PopCorn, an MTR-owned shopping centre in Hong Kong, connected to Tseung Kwan O station

== Popcorn-like formations and substances ==
- Cave popcorn, a common cave formation
- Foam peanut or packing peanut, sometimes referred to as popcorn
- Popcorn ceiling, a decorative ceiling treatment
- Popcorn lung, an informal name for bronchiolitis obliterans (BO), a lung disease
- Popcorn noise, a burst noise of electronic components

== Other uses ==
- Popcorn function, a mathematical function
- Popcorning, a sporadic jumping behavior of guinea pigs
- Popcorn flowers, genus Plagiobothrys

== See also ==
- Pop Carn (2003 film), a Tamil film
- Pop Kaun?, a 2023 Hindi TV series
- PopCorners, an American snack brand
