= The Popcorn =

Single by James Brown

from the album The Popcorn
- B-side: "The Chicken"
- Released: May 1969
- Recorded: August 26, 1968
- Venue: Dallas Memorial Auditorium
- Genre: Soul, funk
- Length: 2:55
- Label: King; 6240; SK-13028
- Songwriter: James Brown
- Producer: James Brown

James Brown singles chronology
"I Don't Want Nobody to Give Me Nothing (Open Up the Door, I'll Get It Myself)" (1969)	"The Popcorn" (1969)	"Mother Popcorn (You Got to Have a Mother for Me)" (1969)

Audio video
- "The Popcorn" on YouTube

"The Popcorn" is a 1969 instrumental written and recorded by James Brown. It was the first of several records Brown made inspired by the popular dance of the same name. Released as a single on King Records, it charted #11 R&B and #30 Pop. It also appeared as the title track of an album released the same year. The full 4 minute and 32 second recording of the song was released in 1996 as part of the Foundations of Funk – A Brand New Bag: 1964–1969 compilation album.

Like most other songs on The Popcorn album, The Popcorn was recorded after a concert in Dallas at the empty Dallas Memorial Auditorium on August 26, 1968. The live performance that preceded this recording was released on the album Say It Live and Loud: Live in Dallas 08.26.68 in 1998 and featured a previously unheard performance of the song during the show.

== Background ==
The Popcorn was the road arrangement of an earlier single entitled "Bringing Up the Guitar" by Alfred Ellis and The Dapps, featuring many of the same band members.

== Personnel ==
- Waymon Reed — trumpet
- Richard "Kush" Griffin — trumpet
- Fred Wesley — trombone
- Maceo Parker — tenor saxophone
- St. Clair Pinckney — baritone saxophone
- Alfred "Pee Wee" Ellis — organ
- Jimmy Nolen — guitar
- Alfonzo Kellum — bass
- Clyde Stubblefield — drums

== Chart performance ==
Chart (1969)	Peak position
US Billboard Hot 100	30
US Best Selling Rhythm & Blues Singles (Billboard)	11

== "The Chicken" ==
- The single's B-side, "The Chicken", written by Brown's saxophonist and bandleader Alfred Ellis, was prominently covered by jazz bassist Jaco Pastorius on his live albums Invitation and The Birthday Concert.
