= The Popcorn (album) =

Studio album by James Brown
- Released: August 1969
- Recorded: April 29, 1968 ("In The Middle"); August 26, 1968 (remainder of titles)
- Studio: King Studios (Cincinnati, Ohio) ("In The Middle"); Dallas Memorial Auditorium (remainder of titles)
- Genre: Funk, soul, R&B
- Length: 33:14
- Label: King
- Producer: James Brown

James Brown chronology
| Gettin' Down to It (1969) | The Popcorn (1969) | It's a Mother (1969) |

Singles from The Popcorn
- 1. "Soul Pride" Released: March 1969; 2. "The Popcorn" Released: May 1969

Professional ratings
Review scores
| Source | Rating |
|---|---|
| AllMusic | 3/5 stars |
| The Rolling Stone Album Guide | 3/5 stars |

The Popcorn is the 25th studio album by American musician James Brown. The album was released in August 1969, by King Records.

Almost the entirety of The Popcorn was recorded in a single night at the empty Dallas Memorial Auditorium after a concert show in Dallas, Texas on August 26, 1968, the exception to this is "In The Middle" which was recorded earlier for the A Soulful Christmas album. The concert that preceded the other tracks' recording was later released as the live album Say It Live and Loud: Live in Dallas 08.26.68. in 1998.

== Chart performance ==
The album debuted on Billboard magazine's Top LP's chart in the issue dated August 23, 1969, peaking at No. 40 during a thirteen-week run on the chart.

== Track listing ==
| No. | Title | Writer(s) | Length |
|---|---|---|---|
| 1. | "The Popcorn" | James Brown | 3:01 |
| 2. | "Why Am I Treated So Bad" | Roebuck Staples | 6:04 |
| 3. | "In the Middle, Pt. 1 & 2" | Alfred Ellis, Bud Hobgood | 6:50 |
| 4. | "Soul Pride, Pts. 1 & 2" | James Brown, Alfred Ellis | 4:28 |
| 5. | "A New Shift" | Alfred Ellis | 3:37 |
| 6. | "Sudsy" | James Brown, Alfred Ellis | 4:41 |
| 7. | "The Chicken" | Alfred Ellis | 4:04 |
| 8. | "The Chase" | James Brown, Bud Hobgood | 0:29 |

== Personnel ==
- Waymon Reed – trumpet
- Richard "Kush" Griffith – trumpet
- Fred Wesley – trombone
- Levi Rasbury – valve trombone
- Alfred "Pee Wee" Ellis – alto saxophone, organ ("The Popcorn")
- Maceo Parker – tenor saxophone, piano ("In The Middle")
- St. Clair Pinckney – baritone saxophone, tenor saxophone ("In The Middle")
- Jimmy Nolen – guitar
- Alfonzo Kellum – bass
- Tim Drummond – bass ("In The Middle")
- Clyde Stubblefield – drums

== Charts ==
| Chart (1969) | Peak position |
|---|---|
| US Billboard Top LPs | 40 |
