= Say It Loud – I'm Black and I'm Proud (album) =

Studio album by James Brown
- Released: March 1969
- Recorded: August 17, 1967 – October 18, 1968
- Studio: King Studios (Cincinnati, Ohio); Mastersound Studios (Atlanta, Georgia); Fine Studios (New York City, New York); Bell Sound Studios (New York City, New York); Vox Studios (Los Angeles, California)
- Genre: Funk
- Length: 36:54
- Label: King; 1047
- Producer: James Brown

James Brown chronology
A Soulful Christmas (1968)	Say It Loud – I'm Black and I'm Proud (1969)	Gettin' Down to It (1969)

Singles from Say It Loud – I'm Black and I'm Proud
- 1. "I Guess I'll Have to Cry, Cry, Cry" Released: July 1968; 2. "Say It Loud – I'm Black and I'm Proud" Released: September 1969; 3. "Goodbye My Love" Released: October 1968

Professional ratings
Review scores
Source	Rating
AllMusic	3.5/5 stars
The Rolling Stone Album Guide	4/5 stars

Say It Loud – I'm Black and I'm Proud is the 23rd studio album by American musician James Brown. The album was released in March 1969, by King Records.

== Chart performance ==
The album debuted on Billboard magazine's Top LP's chart in the issue dated April 12, 1969, peaking at No. 53 during a twenty-two week run on the chart.

== Track listing ==
No.	Title	Writer(s)	Length
1.	"Say It Loud – I'm Black and I'm Proud"	James Brown, Alfred Ellis	4:48
2.	"I Guess I'll Have to Cry, Cry, Cry"	James Brown	3:36
3.	"Goodbye My Love, Pts. 1 & 2"	James Brown	5:34
4.	"Shades of Brown"	Bud Hobgood	2:48
5.	"Licking Stick, Pt. 1"	James Brown	2:55
6.	"I Love You"	James Brown, Clyde Stubblefield, Alfonzo Kellum	3:36
7.	"Then You Can Tell Me Goodbye"	John D. Loudermilk	3:55
8.	"Let Them Talk"	Sonny Thompson	4:04
9.	"Maybe I'll Understand"	James Brown, Bud Hobgood	3:20
10.	"I'll Lose My Mind"	James Brown, Bud Hobgood, Bobby Byrd	2:47

== Personnel ==
- James Brown – vocals, organ
- Bobby Byrd – co-vocals ("Licking Stick")

The James Brown Orchestra

- Waymon Reed, Richard "Kush" Griffin, Dud Bascomb, Johnny Grimes, Joe Dupars – trumpet
- Fred Wesley, Richard Harris – trombone
- Levi Rasbury – valve trombone
- Pee Wee Ellis – alto saxophone
- Maceo Parker, St. Clair Pinckney – tenor saxophone
- St. Clair Pinckney, Haywood Henry – baritone saxophone
- Pee Wee Ellis – organ
- Ernie Hayes – piano
- Selwart Clarke, Winston Collymore, Charles Libove, Harry Katzman, Sam Ram, Harry Malnikoff, Matt Raimondi, Marion Cuabo, Sid Edwards, Nick Hardone – strings
- Jimmy Nolen, Wallace Richardson, Carl Lynch – guitar
- Al Lucas, Alfonzo Kellum, Bernard Odum or Sweet Charles Sherrell – bass
- Rafael Rivera – timbales
- Julian Cabeza – congas
- Edward Williams – percussion
- Clyde Stubblefield, Bernard Purdie, Jabo Starks – drums

The Dapps ("Shades of Brown", "Then You Can Tell me Goodbye", "Maybe I'll Understand", "I'll Lose My Mind")

- probably Ron Geisman – trumpet
- Les Asch – tenor saxophone
- David Parkinson – baritone saxophone
- Tim Hedding – organ, piano
- “Fat Eddie” Setser, Troy Seals – guitar
- Ken Tibbetts, Tim Drummond – bass
- Beau Dollar – drums

== Charts ==
Chart (1969)	Peak position
US Billboard Top LPs	53
