= The Chicken (music) =

1969 song by Pee Wee Ellis

"The Chicken" or simply "Chicken" is an instrumental funk tune composed by Pee Wee Ellis that was the B-side to James Brown's 1969 single "The Popcorn". The tune gained greater exposure with versions by jazz bassist Jaco Pastorius, who prefaced it with an original introductory piece he composed titled "Soul Intro"; this pairing has since been adopted by many other artists performing the track.

Notable versions by Ellis or Pastorius include:

- Pee Wee Ellis versions, recorded and renamed as "Chicken Soup" by Dave Liebman in 1977
- a studio version by Jaco Pastorius, John Scofield and Kenwood Dennard on Modern Electric Bass educational VHD (1985) and DVD (2002)
- Pastorius on the 1983 album Invitation recorded live in Japan with a big band that included Bob Mintzer (sax), Randy Brecker (tpt), Othello Molineaux (steel pans), Peter Erskine (drums), Don Alias (perc)
- Pastorius on the album The Birthday Concert recorded live on his 30th birthday in 1981 but only released posthumously in 1995

Since then it has become a jazz funk standard, with renditions by musicians including:

- Maceo Parker in the album Mo' Roots released in 1991, with Pee Wee Ellis (tenor sax), Steve Williamson (alto sax), Fred Wesley (trombone), Larry Goldings (keyboards), Rodney Jones (guitar), James Madison, Bill Stewart (drums), Kym Mazelle (vocals)
- Abraham Laboriel and Shepherd University professors
- Tommy Igoe & The Buddy Rich Big Band
- Breakestra
- Mats/Morgan Band at a faster tempo, with Jonas Knutsson playing saxophone
- Bobby Sanabria Big Band on the double Grammy nominated album Multiverse (2012)
- Matteo Mancuso with Valeriy Stepanov on keyboards the album Route 96 (2026)
