= America Is My Home =

"America Is My Home - Pt. 1"

Single by James Brown
- B-side: "America Is My Home - Pt. 2"
- Released: 1968
- Recorded: 1967
- Genre: Soul
- Length: 3:15 (Pt. 1); 3:20 (Pt. 2)
- Label: King; 6112
- Songwriter(s): James Brown; Hayward E. Moore
- Producer(s): James Brown

James Brown charting singles chronology
"Licking Stick – Licking Stick (Part 1)" (1968)	"America Is My Home - Pt. 1" (1968)	"I Guess I'll Have to Cry, Cry, Cry" (1968)

Audio video
- "America Is My Home" on YouTube

"America Is My Home" is a 1968 single by James Brown. It was intended as a patriotic song written by Brown and Hayward E. Moore, recorded in 1967 in response to increasing criticism of the Vietnam War by black leaders such as Martin Luther King Jr. and Stokely Carmichael. Brown speaks rather than sings the words of the song over an instrumental backing. The lyrics affirm that "America is still the best country, without a doubt" and claim "black and white, they may fight, but if the enemy come we'll get together and run 'em out of sight." Brown delayed the song's release until the summer of 1968 when he thought the timing was right. It charted #13 R&B and #52 Pop. He followed it later that year with "Say It Loud - I'm Black and I'm Proud".
