= Melton Mustafa =

American trumpeter, composer, and educator (1947–2017)

Melton "Shakir" Mustafa Sr. (November 23, 1947 – December 28, 2017) was an American jazz trumpeter, flugelhorn player, composer, arranger, and music educator. Mustafa was also a native of Miami, Florida. He performed with some of the most influential figures in jazz, like the Count Basie Orchestra, Duke Ellington Orchestra, and Frank Sinatra, while also being a bandleader himself and a educator in South Florida.

== Biography ==
=== Early life and education ===
Mustafa was born and raised in Miami, Florida. Mustafa, was also the younger brother of saxophonist Jesse Jones Jr., who led an RnB/calypso band that young Mustafa played in, giving him his early musical experience. He learned the trumpet in middle school and pursued formal music education at the Berklee College of Music and Mississippi Valley State College, but eventually ended up earning a bachelor of Science in Music Education from the Florida A&M University.

=== Performing and recording ===
After college, In the late 1960s he worked in backing bands of soul musicians such as Sam & Dave, Betty Wright, Latimore, The Marvelettes, and Joe Simon. He eventually became active in the jazz scene of Miami and joined Ira Sullivan's band.

In the early 1980s, Mustafa played in Florida in Jaco Pastorius' Word of Mouth Band (Invitation, 1981), following up by performing with Bobby Watson and Randy Bernsen in New York City and from 1986 onward with the Count Basie Orchestra under the direction of Frank Foster (who was involved with recordings by Diane Schuur and Caterina Valente). He also worked with the Duke Ellington Orchestra, Woody Herman and His Orchestra, George Cables, John Hicks, Mingus Dynasty, and Gunther Schuller.

In 1995, Mustafa recorded the big band album Boiling Point (Contemporary) under his own name, followed by St. Louis Blues (1997). He also recorded with Eric Allison (Mean Streets Beat, 1996) and his brother Jesse Jones Jr. (Soul Serenade, 1996). His last album, The Travelling Man, was recorded in 2012. In the field of jazz, between 1980 and 2012, he was involved in 32 recording sessions.

=== Educator and legacy ===
In later years, Mustafa was mainly active in Florida as a music teacher; He founded the program for jazz studies at Florida Memorial University in Miami Gardens. There is also an annual Melton Mustafa Jazz Festival that started in the 1990s, and still going on in 2025 by his family and Melton Mustafa Jr.. The festival also served as a fundraiser for college and high school jazz students. There, jazz greats such as Jon Faddis, Benny Golson, Grover Washington Jr., Wallace Roney, Patrice Rushen, Billy Cobham, Herbie Mann, Billy Taylor, Clark Terry and Randy Brecker performed. Mustafa died in 2017 in Miami from prostate cancer.

The Melton Mustafa Jazz Festival that was founded in 1996 was made with the goal of bringing top tier jazz musicians in the world to South Florida. The festival also made as a fundraiser for college and high school jazz students, Which Mustafa supported through his non profit MSM Arts Inc. according to the Sun sentinel. Beyond the festival, Mustafa also ended up contributing to his community where he was chairing the Jazz Historic Heritage Committee, which ended up being an instrumental part in creating a jazz and community center at Brownsville's historic Hampton House in 2006.
