= Invitation (Jaco Pastorius album) =

Live album by Jaco Pastorius
- Released: December 1983
- Recorded: September 1–4, 1982
- Venues: Tokyo, Osaka, and Yokohama
- Genre: Jazz
- Length: 43:05
- Label: Warner Bros.
- Producer: Jaco Pastorius

Jaco Pastorius chronology
Word of Mouth (1981)	Invitation (1983)

Professional ratings
Review scores
Source	Rating
Allmusic	4.5/5 stars
The Rolling Stone Jazz Record Guide	4/5 stars
The Penguin Guide to Jazz Recordings	3/4 stars

Invitation is a live album by Jaco Pastorius, released in December 1983. It was recorded at various venues during a tour of Japan in September 1982, featuring his "Word of Mouth" big band. While his debut album showcased his eclectic and impressive skills on the electric bass, both Invitation and his previous album, Word of Mouth focused more on his ability to arrange for a larger band.

This album features mostly numbers written by other artists. The exceptions are new arrangements of "Continuum", from his debut album, and "Liberty City", from Word of Mouth, as well as "Reza", an original number bookending his version of John Coltrane's "Giant Steps".

The band's all-star cast included Randy Brecker, Bob Mintzer, Toots Thielemans, Peter Erskine, Othello Molineaux, and Don Alias.

Invitation is the reduced version of the albums Twins I & Twins II, released in 1982 only in Japan.

Several tracks were heavily edited (Invitation, Liberty City, Sophisticated Lady & Reza/Giant Steps/Reza) and 4 tracks were ommited (Three Views Of A Secret, Okonkolé Y Trompa, Elegant People & Twins).

== Track listing ==
No.	Title	Writer(s)	Length
1.	"Invitation"	Kaper	6:57
2.	"Amerika"	Traditional	1:09
3.	"Soul Intro/The Chicken"	Jaco Pastorius/Ellis	6:49
4.	"Continuum"	Pastorius	4:28
5.	"Liberty City"	Pastorius	4:35
6.	"Sophisticated Lady"	Ellington, Mills, Parish	5:17
7.	"Reza/Giant Steps/Reza (Reprise)"	Pastorius/Coltrane	10:23
8.	"Fannie Mae"	Brown, Clarence Lewis, Morgan Robinson	2:38
9.	"Eleven"	Davis, Evans	0:49
Total length:			43:05

== Personnel ==
- Jaco Pastorius – electric bass, vocals (on "Fannie Mae")
- Randy Brecker – trumpet
- Bob Mintzer – tenor and soprano saxophone
- Jean "Toots" Thielemans – harmonica (listed as a "special guest")
- Peter Erskine – drums
- Othello Molineaux – steel drum
- Don Alias – percussion

=== Additional ===
- Elmer Brown, Forrest Buchtel, Ron Tooley – trumpet
- Jon Faddis – trumpet (solo on "Reza")
- Wayne Andre – trombone
- Dave Bargeron – trombone, tuba
- Peter Graves – bass trombone, co-conductor
- Bill Reichenbach – bass trombone
- Mario Cruz – tenor and soprano saxophone, clarinet, alto flute
- Randy Emerick – baritone saxophone, clarinet
- Alex Foster – tenor, alto, and soprano saxophone, clarinet, piccolo
- Paul McCandless – tenor saxophone, oboe, English horn
- Peter Gordon, Brad Warnaar – French horn

== See also ==
- Jaco Pastorius discography
