= Soul Pride =

"Soul Pride (Part 1)"

Single by James Brown

from the album The Popcorn
- B-side: "Soul Pride (Part 2)"
- Released: March 1969
- Recorded: August 26, 1968
- Venue: Dallas Memorial Auditorium
- Genre: Funk
- Length: 2:10 (Part 1); 2:10 (Part 2)
- Label: King; 6222; K-12733
- Songwriters: James Brown; Pee Wee Ellis
- Producer: James Brown

James Brown charting singles chronology
"Give It Up or Turnit a Loose" (1969)	"Soul Pride (Part 1)" (1969)	"I Don't Want Nobody to Give Me Nothing (Open Up the Door, I'll Get It Myself) (Part 1)" (1969)

Audio video
- "Soul Pride (Parts 1 And 2)" on YouTube

"Soul Pride" is an instrumental written by James Brown and Pee Wee Ellis and recorded by James Brown with his band. Released as a two-part single in March 1969, it charted #33 R&B and #117 Pop. A stereo version of the track later appeared on The Popcorn album in August 1969.

The song was first recorded during a session at Vox Studios on August 7, 1968 but this would go unreleased and what would become the single was recorded after a concert in Dallas at the empty Dallas Memorial Auditorium on the 26th. The live performance that preceded this recording was released on the album Say It Live and Loud: Live in Dallas 08.26.68 in 1998 and featured a previously unheard performance of the song during the show.

== Personnel ==
- Waymon Reed — trumpet
- Richard "Kush" Griffin — trumpet
- Fred Wesley — trombone
- Alfred "Pee Wee" Ellis — alto saxophone
- Maceo Parker — tenor saxophone
- St. Clair Pinckney — baritone saxophone
- Jimmy Nolen — guitar
- Alfonzo Kellum — bass
- Clyde Stubblefield — drums
