= Word of Mouth (Jaco Pastorius album) =

Studio album by Jaco Pastorius
- Released: July 1981
- Recorded: 1980–1981
- Genres: Jazz, jazz fusion
- Length: 43:53
- Label: Warner Bros.
- Producer: Jaco Pastorius

Jaco Pastorius chronology
Jaco Pastorius (1976)	Word of Mouth (1981)	Invitation (1983)

Word of Mouth is the second and final solo studio album by American bassist Jaco Pastorius, released in 1981, while he was still a member of the jazz fusion group Weather Report, and also the name of a big band that Pastorius assembled and with which he toured in 1982.

== Critical reception ==
Professional ratings
Review scores
Source	Rating
AllMusic	4/5 stars
The Penguin Guide to Jazz Recordings	3.5/4 stars
The Rolling Stone Jazz Record Guide	2/5 stars

Reviewing the album in The Penguin Guide to Jazz Recordings, Cook and Morton favorably assessed the album, writing: "A brilliant example of Jaco’s gift for sound ... A lovely record, full of surprises", while in contrast Swenson saw the album as a troubled follow-up to the previous Jaco Pastorius album.

== Background ==
While his debut album showcased his eclectic and impressive skills on electric bass, Word of Mouth focused more on his ability to compose and arrange for a larger band. The album still shows off Pastorius's skill, most notably in the solo opening to "Chromatic Fantasy" by J.S. Bach and the title track. "Crisis" also features a fast, bass pattern looping, which runs under the frantic soloing. Most of the rest of the album's bass is subdued and blends into the band's arrangement. The song "John and Mary" is dedicated to his children from his first marriage to Tracy; he had two other children, twin sons Julius and Felix with his second wife, Ingrid.

The band included Herbie Hancock, Wayne Shorter, Peter Erskine, Jack DeJohnette, Michael Brecker, Don Alias, and Toots Thielemans, who is featured on harmonica on many of the songs.

=== Crediting controversy ===
The first 50,000 copies of the album lacked credits for all participating musicians. As the result of a lawsuit against Warner Bros., CBS forbade the names of a few of the (less well-known) musicians to be mentioned on the sleeve. Pastorius defiantly replied that "if they can't be listed, then nobody will be listed". On later copies of the album, the names were listed.

== Track listing ==
All tracks written by Jaco Pastorius except where noted.

No.	Title	Writer(s)	Length
1.	"Crisis"		5:17
2.	"Three Views of a Secret"		6:05
3.	"Liberty City"		11:57
4.	"Chromatic Fantasy"	Bach	3:01
5.	"Blackbird"	Lennon–McCartney	2:48
6.	"Word of Mouth"		3:53
7.	"John and Mary"		10:52
Total length:			43:53

*For the original LP, Cassette and CD release, "Crisis" was 5:21. However, for reasons that are unclear, the current MP3 downloads cut the first three seconds of the improvisation. The 1981 Warner Brothers promo disc has the 5:17 listing for "Crisis."
**"Word of Mouth" is listed as being 4:21 in the liner notes, as it begins with the feedback at the end of "Blackbird" and ends with the whispering and giggling at the start of "John and Mary".

== Personnel ==
- Jaco Pastorius – electric bass (1–7), double bass, organ, piano (2), synthesizer (1–3), autoharp, koto, percussion, vocals (7)
- Herbie Hancock – keyboards, synthesizers, piano (3)
- Wayne Shorter – soprano sax (7)
- Michael Brecker, Tom Scott, Mario Cruz – saxophone
- Hubert Laws – soprano & alto flute (4, 5)
- Chuck Findley – trumpet
- John Clark – French horn
- Howard Johnson – tuba
- Toots Thielemans – harmonica (2–6)
- Don Alias – percussion (1, 4–6)
- Robert Thomas Jr. – percussion (3, 7)
- Peter Erskine – drums (1, 3–7)
- Jack DeJohnette – drums (2)
- Othello Molineaux and Leroy Williams – steel pans (3, 7)
- John F. Pastorius IV – vocal (7)
- Mary Pastorius IV – vocal (7)

== See also ==
- Jaco Pastorius discography
