= Matteo Mancuso =

Italian guitarist (born 1996)

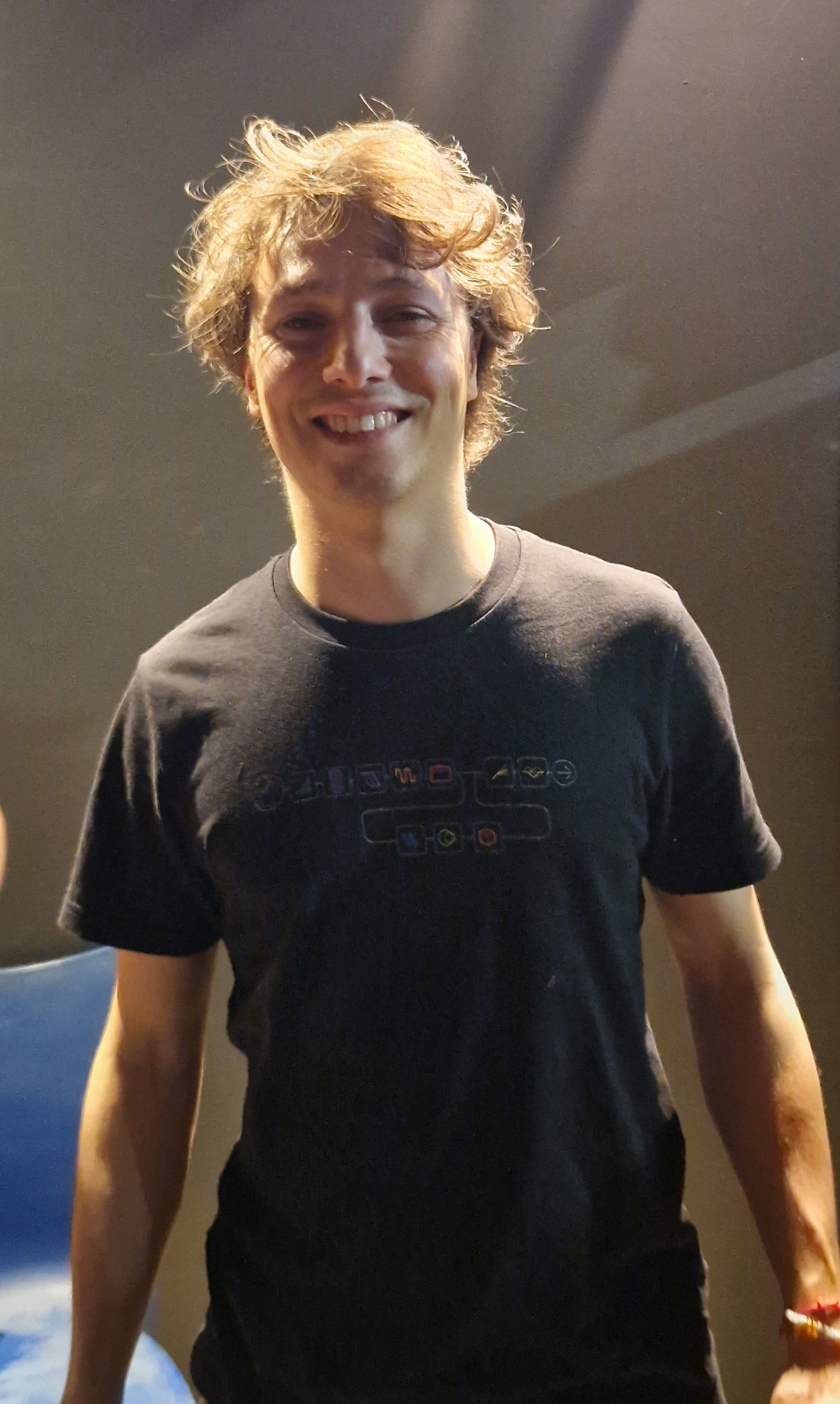
- Matteo Mancuso (2023)

Background information
- Born: 22 November 1996 (age 29); Palermo, Sicily, Italy
- Genres: Jazz rock; progressive rock; rock
- Occupation: Guitarist
- Years active: 2006–present
- Label: Mascot Label Group
- Website: matteomancuso.net

Matteo Mancuso (born 22 November 1996) is an Italian guitarist and composer from Palermo, Sicily. Mancuso is known for adapting a quasi-flamenco/classical right-hand technique to the electric guitar and improvised solos without the use of a pick. Steve Vai, Al Di Meola, Joe Bonamassa, Jason Becker, and others have publicly praised him, with Vai calling him "the future" of electric guitar.

In 2023, he released his first studio album, The Journey.

== Education ==
Mancuso was born in 1996 in Palermo. He started playing the guitar at the age of 10 with his father, Vincenzo, an experienced professional guitarist and music producer who performed with many well-known Italian artists. Mancuso began performing live on stage at the age of 11.

In 2017, following his performance at the Umbria Jazz Festival, he was awarded a scholarship to the Berklee College of Music in Boston.

After obtaining a diploma from the music high school, where he studied classical guitar and transverse flute, in June 2022, he graduated with honours in jazz guitar from the Palermo Conservatory of Music.

== Career ==
In 2009, at the age of 12, Mancuso performed at the Castelbuono Jazz Festival in Sicily and in 2017 at the Umbria Jazz Festival in Perugia.

Mancuso performed at the NAMM Show in Anaheim, California in 2019 and 2024. In 2019 he participated in the Asia International Guitar Festival in Bangkok, the Hard Rock Guitar Battle in Pattaya and the NAMM Musikmesse Russia, and held a series of guitar clinics in Moscow, St. Petersburg and Perm.

In 2022, he was invited by Al Di Meola in the thirty-first edition of Eddie Lang Jazz Festival, to duet with him on stage. He was also chosen by Italian progressive rock band PFM to perform live in Lugano Estival Jazz, replacing their guitarist, who was busy on that day. PFM then released a 16-track double album called The Event – Live in Lugano, which is the first live record to feature Matteo Mancuso on guitar.

In 2024 Mancuso was a featured artist at Steve Vai's "Vai Academy 7.0" guitar camp in Orlando, Florida. He conducted clinics, performed in concert and jammed with Steve Vai and his band, joined by keyboardist Jordan Rudess.

=== SNIPS ===
In 2017, Mancuso founded a trio called "SNIPS", which includes Salvatore Lima on drums and Riccardo Oliva on bass. SNIPS is a jazz fusion band, and their music is based on rearrangements of popular fusion standards and original compositions. Their version of The Chicken hit 2.2 million views on YouTube. In the following year the trio has played at the Musika-Expo in Rome and at Musikmesse in Frankfurt.

=== Matteo Mancuso Trio ===
The trio was formed in 2020 with Stefano India on Bass and Giuseppe Bruno on Drums. When Mancuso uploaded their performance of 'Havona' by Jaco Pastorius to YouTube, the trio received recognition for their "killer lineup"

In 2022, Matteo Mancuso Trio performed at the Bremen International Festival; the Auditorium Parco della Musica in Rome; Uppsala Jazz Festival in Sweden; Spoleto Jazz Festival in Italy.

=== The Journey ===
Mancuso's debut album, The Journey, was released on 21 July 2023 through The Players Club, a division of Mascot Label Group. The instrumental album ranges from jazz and fusion to hard rock and progressive rock, and features both electric and acoustic guitar. Reviews praised Mancuso's phrasing and the album's stylistic variety. Graeme Stroud of Velvet Thunder compared aspects of his playing to Carlos Santana, John McLaughlin, Steve Vai and Al Di Meola, while describing Mancuso's own musical voice as distinctive. Guitar World ranked The Journey fourth on its list of the best guitar albums of 2023 and "Silkroad" seventh on its list of the year's best guitar solos.

=== North America 2024 ===
Matteo toured from 25 January to 4 February in the following US cities: Agoura Hills (Los Angeles), San Pedro, Bakersfield, Orangevale (Sacramento) and Chicago.

=== Route 96 ===
In 2026, Mancuso released his second solo album, Route 96, with bassist Riccardo Oliva and drummer Gianluca Pellerito. The album features guest appearances by Steve Vai on "Solar Wind", gypsy jazz guitarist Antoine Boyer on "Isla Feliz", and keyboardist Valeriy Stepanov on the bonus track "The Chicken". Musically, Route 96 combines jazz fusion and rock with Latin, classical and gypsy jazz influences.

== Style ==
Mancuso switches to using a free stroke with his index finger and middle finger to pick the strings like a classical guitar player, a finger-style right hand technique reminiscent of flamenco. He is considered a virtuoso of the instrument by renowned guitarists such as Al Di Meola, Steve Vai, Joe Bonamassa, Tosin Abasi and Trevor Rabin.

== Discography ==
Studio

- The Journey (2023)
- Route 96 (2026)

As a member of Drift Lab

- Moonlight (2023)

Guest appearance

- PFM – THE EVENT - Live In Lugano] (2022)
