= Portrait of Tracy =

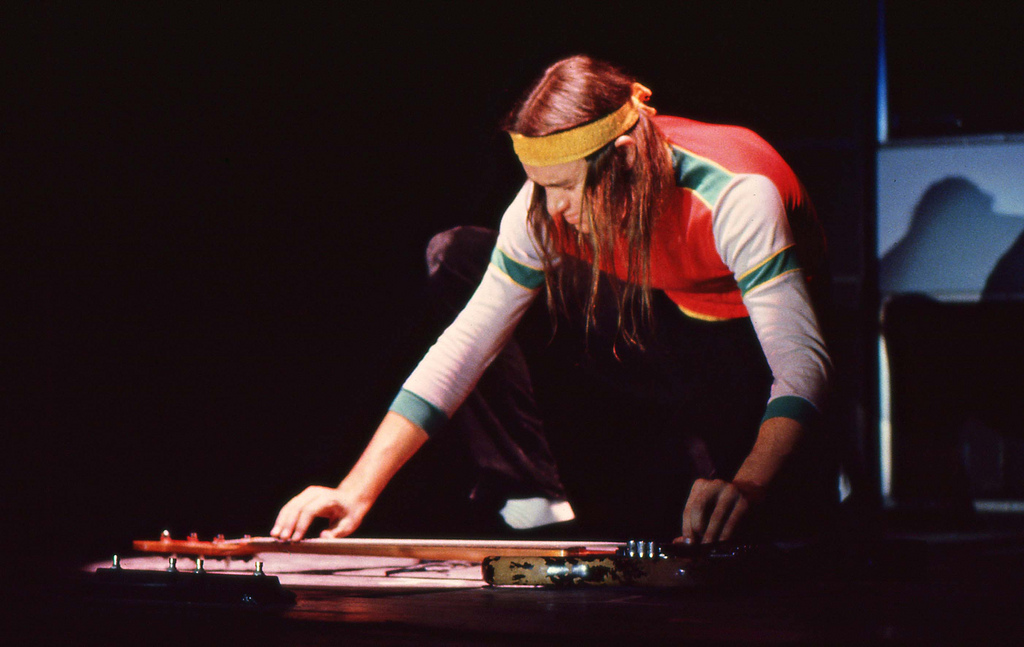
- Pastorius playing Portrait of Tracy demonstrates his harmonics, placing his electric bass on the floor (Amsterdam, 1980)

Instrumental by Jaco Pastorius

from the album Jaco Pastorius
- Released: August 1976
- Recorded: Camp Colomby Studios and Columbia Recording Studios C&B, New York City, New York
- Genre: Jazz fusion
- Length: 2:23
- Label: Epic/Legacy (Sony Music)
- Songwriter: Jaco Pastorius
- Producer: Bobby Colomby

Audio sample
- file; help

"Portrait of Tracy" is a composition for bass guitar by American jazz bassist Jaco Pastorius. It is featured on his debut studio album, Jaco Pastorius (1976). It was named after his first wife Tracy Sexton.
