= Goodbye My Love (James Brown song) =

Single by James Brown

from the album Say It Loud – I'm Black and I'm Proud
- B-side: "Shades of Brown"
- Released: 1968
- Genre: Soul
- Length: 5:36
- Label: King Records
- Songwriter(s): James Brown

James Brown singles chronology
"Say It Loud – I'm Black and I'm Proud" (1968)	"Goodbye My Love" (1968)	"Tit for Tat (Ain't No Taking Back)" (1968)

Audio video
- "Goodbye My Love" on YouTube

"Goodbye My Love" is a song written and performed by James Brown. Released as a single in 1968, it charted #9 R&B and #31 Pop.
