= Licking Stick – Licking Stick =

"Licking Stick – Licking Stick (Part 1)"

Single by James Brown

from the album Say It Loud – I'm Black and I'm Proud
- B-side: "Licking Stick – Licking Stick (Part 2)"
- Released: May 1968
- Recorded: April 16, 1968, King Studios, Cincinnati, OH
- Genre: Funk
- Length: 2:50 (Part 1); 2:15 (Part 2)
- Label: King; 6166
- Songwriter(s): James Brown; Bobby Byrd; Alfred Ellis
- Producer(s): James Brown

James Brown charting singles chronology
"I Got the Feelin'" (1968)	"Licking Stick – Licking Stick (Part 1)" (1968)	"America Is My Home" (1968)

Audio video
- "Licking Stick - Licking Stick" on YouTube

"Licking Stick – Licking Stick" is a song written by James Brown, Bobby Byrd, and Alfred "Pee Wee" Ellis and recorded by Brown as a two-part single in 1968. Byrd provides backing vocals on the song. It was the first stereo single release by King Records. The song was included on the album Say It Loud – I'm Black and I'm Proud.

The title of the song refers to a stick used to administer corporal punishment (a "licking").

== Chart positions ==
Chart (1968)	Peak position
U.S. Billboard Hot 100	14
U.S. Billboard R&B	2

== Personnel ==
- James Brown– lead vocal
- Bobby Byrd – organ
- Alfred "Pee Wee" Ellis – alto saxophone
- Maceo Parker – tenor saxophone
- St. Clair Pinckney – baritone saxophone
- Jimmy Nolen – electric guitar
- Tim Drummond – bass
- Jabo Starks – drums

== Live version ==
Brown performs live versions of "Licking Stick – Licking Stick" on his 1970 album Sex Machine, as well as on the 1998 release Say It Live and Loud: Live in Dallas 08.26.68.
