= Say It Loud – I'm Black and I'm Proud =

1968 single by James Brown

"Say It Loud – I'm Black and I'm Proud (Part 1)"
- The Say It Loud – I'm Black and I'm Proud album

Single by James Brown

from the album A Soulful Christmas and Say It Loud – I'm Black and I'm Proud
- B-side: "Say It Loud – I'm Black and I'm Proud (Part 2)"
- Released: August 1968
- Recorded: August 7, 1968
- Studio: Vox, Los Angeles
- Length: 2:45 (Part 1); 2:30 (Part 2)
- Label: King
- Songwriters: James Brown; Alfred Ellis
- Producer: James Brown

James Brown charting singles chronology
"I Guess I'll Have to Cry, Cry, Cry" (1968)	"Say It Loud – I'm Black and I'm Proud (Part 1)" (1968)	"Goodbye My Love" (1968)

Audio video
- "Say It Loud - I'm Black And I'm Proud (Pts.1 & 2)" on YouTube

"Say It Loud – I'm Black and I'm Proud" is a funk song performed by James Brown, and written with his bandleader Alfred "Pee Wee" Ellis in 1968. It was released as a two-part single, which held the number-one spot on the R&B singles chart for six weeks, and peaked at number ten on the Billboard Hot 100. Both parts of the single were included on James Brown's 1968 album A Soulful Christmas and on his 1969 album sharing the title of the song. The song became an unofficial anthem of the Black Power movement.

"Say It Loud – I'm Black and I'm Proud" was Brown's first recording to feature trombonist Fred Wesley.

== Lyrics ==
In the song, Brown addresses racism against Black Americans, and the need for Black empowerment. He proclaims that "we demands a chance to do things for ourself" and that "we're tired of beating our head against the wall and workin' for someone else." The song's call and response chorus is performed by a group of young children, who respond to Brown's command of "Say it loud" with "I'm black and I'm proud!" The song was recorded in a Los Angeles area suburb with about 30 young people from the Watts and Compton neighborhoods.

The lyrics "We've been 'buked and we've been scorned/ We've been treated bad, talked about as sure as you're born" in the first verse of the song paraphrase the spiritual I've Been 'Buked. Several other Brown singles from the same era as "Say It Loud – I'm Black and I'm Proud", notably "I Don't Want Nobody to Give Me Nothing (Open Up the Door, I'll Get It Myself)", explored similar themes of Black empowerment and self-reliance. The song's opening exhortation, "With your bad self", is an example of linguistic reappropriation, and added a new entry to Brown's long list of nicknames: "His Bad Self".

== Recognitions ==
The Rock and Roll Hall of Fame included "Say It Loud – I'm Black and I'm Proud" in its 500 Songs That Shaped Rock and Roll. In 2004, it was ranked number 305 on Rolling Stone magazine's list of the 500 greatest songs of all time. In 2025, the publication ranked the song at number 5 on its list of "The 100 Best Protest Songs of All Time." It inspired the title of a VH1 television special and box set Say It Loud! A Celebration of Black Music in America.

"'Say It Loud – I'm Black and I'm Proud' was a record that really convinced me to say I was black instead of a negro," remarked Public Enemy's Chuck D. "Back then black folks were called negroes, but James said you can say it loud: that being black is a great thing instead of something you have to apologize for."

However, in direct response to the song's message, Willie Cobbs wryly observed that Brown was a millionaire by that point, as Cobbs retort was "Sing It Low - I'm Black and I'm Poor".

== Personnel ==
- James Brown – lead vocal
- Unknown children's chorus
- Ryan Hayman-Ball Prep Academy

with the James Brown Orchestra:

- Waymon Reed – trumpet
- Richard "Kush" Griffith – trumpet
- Fred Wesley – trombone
- Alfred "Pee Wee" Ellis – alto saxophone
- Maceo Parker – tenor saxophone
- St. Clair Pinckney – baritone saxophone
- Jimmy Nolen – electric guitar
- Charles Sherrell – bass
- Clyde Stubblefield – drums

== Other versions and uses ==
Numerous hip hop musicians and groups have sampled "Say It Loud – I'm Black and I'm Proud", including Eric B. and Rakim, Big Daddy Kane, Full Force, LL Cool J and 2 Live Crew in the states and Akil Ammar for the Mexican underground scene.

A few performers have recorded cover versions of the song, including jazz saxophonist Lou Donaldson (on his 1969 album Say It Loud!), reggae singer Bob Marley (in a medley with "Black Progress") and the punk rock band Black Randy and the Metrosquad.

A slightly modified version of the bassline of "Say It Loud – I'm Black and I'm Proud" appears in long sections of the track "Yesternow" on the Miles Davis album A Tribute to Jack Johnson.

Jazz pianist Jaki Byard recites the title phrase at the onset of "Parisian Thoroughfare", the opening track of his album The Jaki Byard Experience. However, the recitation is only audible when the track is played at a high volume.

The song is referenced in the 20th episode of the second season of The Fresh Prince of Bel-Air, titled "Those Were The Days." Inspired by Black Power protests, Will, the African-American male lead, attempts to hold a protest to get a popular teacher reinstated (ironically, Will and his cousin Carlton are the only black people in the room). This inspires "Cornflake," a white fellow student, who stands up and shouts passionately "Fight the power, Will! Sing it loud, I'm black and I'm proud," to which Will replies "See, my man Cornflake's got the spirit. He's a little confused, but he's got the spirit."

The song is also referenced in the Temptations song "Message from a Black Man".

"Let's Take It to the Stage," the title track of the 1975 album by Funkadelic, gives a nod to this song with the lyric "Say it loud, I'm funky and I'm proud." Funkadelic had previously referenced the lyric in “Music for my Mother” on their debut album as well.

R&B/Rock artist Meshell Ndegeocello covers the song during her live performances.
