= The Birthday Concert =

Live album by Jaco Pastorius
- Released: September 26, 1995
- Recorded: December 1, 1981
- Venues: Mr. Pip's, Fort Lauderdale, Florida
- Genre: Jazz fusion
- Length: 69:24
- Label: Warner Bros.
- Producer: Peter Erskine

Jaco Pastorius chronology
Jazz Street (1989)	The Birthday Concert (1995)	Another Side of Jaco Pastorius (2002)

Professional ratings
Review scores
Source	Rating
Allmusic	4/5 stars
The Penguin Guide to Jazz Recordings	3/4 stars

The Birthday Concert is a live album by Jaco Pastorius released posthumously in 1995. It was recorded in Florida in 1981 to celebrate Pastorius' 30th birthday. Guests included his friends, such as Michael Brecker and the Peter Graves Orchestra.

== Track listing ==
All tracks composed by Jaco Pastorius except where noted

No.	Title	Writer(s)	Length
1.	"Soul Intro/The Chicken"	Pastorius/Ellis	08:01
2.	"Continuum"		02:34
3.	"Invitation"	Kaper	17:42
4.	"Three Views of a Secret"		05:56
5.	"Liberty City"		08:12
6.	"Punk Jazz"		04:35
7.	"Happy Birthday"	M. Hill, P. Hill	01:48
8.	"Reza"		10:36
9.	"Domingo"		05:39
10.	"Band Intros"		02:38
11.	"Amerika"	Traditional	01:43
Total length:			69:24

== Personnel ==
- Jaco Pastorius – bass
- Brett Murphy – trumpet
- Brian O'Flaherty – trumpet
- Kenneth Faulk – trumpet
- Melton Mustafa – trumpet
- Mike Katz – trombone
- Russ Freeland – trombone
- Peter Graves – bass trombone
- Dave Bargeron – trombone, tuba
- Jerry Peel – French horn
- Peter Gordon – French horn
- Bob Mintzer – bass clarinet, soprano saxophone, tenor saxophone
- Michael Brecker – tenor saxophone
- Randy Emerick – baritone saxophone
- Dan Bonsanti – saxophone, woodwind
- Gary Lindsay – saxophone, woodwind
- Peter Erskine – drums, liner notes
- Othello Molineaux – steel drums
- Don Alias – congas
- Bobby Thomas Jr. - congas
- Oscar Salas – percussion

== See also ==
- Jaco Pastorius discography
