= Gettin' Down to It =

Studio album by James Brown
- Released: May 1969
- Recorded: December 18, 1968 – March 1969
- Studio: King Studios (Cincinnati, Ohio)
- Genre: Soul jazz
- Length: 48:35
- Label: King; 1051
- Producer: James Brown

James Brown chronology
Say It Loud – I'm Black and I'm Proud (1969)	Gettin' Down to It (1969)	The Popcorn (1969)

Professional ratings
Review scores
Source	Rating
AllMusic	3.5/5 stars
The Rolling Stone Album Guide	2/5 stars

Gettin' Down to It is the 24th studio album by American musician James Brown. The album was released in May 1969, by King Records.

== Overview ==
A pet project of Brown's, the album consists of standards sung in the jazz ballad style of Frank Sinatra, whom Brown greatly admired. In addition, two of Brown's own compositions, "Cold Sweat" and an instrumental version of "There Was a Time", are included, reinterpreted in the same style.

== Chart performance ==
The album debuted on Billboard magazine's Top LP's chart in the issue dated May 31, 1969, peaking at No. 99 during a fourteen-week run on the chart.

== Reception ==
Robert Christgau has called it "a ballad album that could scare the shades off Ray Charles".

Al Campbell on AllMusic wrote "Although laid-back could be applied to the album's overall tone, these 12 tracks are by no means 'mellow'."

== Track listing ==
Side one
No.	Title	Writer(s)	Length
1.	"Sunny" (Marva Whitney, vocals)	Bobby Hebb	3:17
2.	"That's Life"	Kelly Gordon, Dean Kay	4:29
3.	"Strangers in the Night"	Bert Kaempfert, Charles Singleton, Eddie Snyder	3:26
4.	"Willow Weep for Me"	Ann Ronell	4:39
5.	"Cold Sweat"	James Brown, Alfred Ellis	5:02
6.	"There Was a Time" (Kenny Poole and Lee Garrett, guitar)	James Brown, Bud Hobgood	2:58

Side two
No.	Title	Writer(s)	Length
1.	"Chicago"	Fred Fisher	2:51
2.	"(I Love You) For Sentimental Reasons"	William Best, Deek Watson	7:40
3.	"Time After Time"	Sammy Cahn, Jule Styne	4:48
4.	"All the Way"	Sammy Cahn	3:40
5.	"It Had to Be You"	Isham Jones, Gus Kahn	2:42
6.	"Uncle" (Kenny Poole, guitar)	Frank Vincent	2:35

== Personnel ==
- James Brown – vocals and producer
- Dee Felice Trio:
  - Frank Vincent – piano
  - Lee Tucker – bass
  - Dee Felice – drums
- Lee Garrett – guitar

== Charts ==
Chart (1969)	Peak position
US Billboard Top LPs	99
