= Tit for Tat (Ain't No Taking Back) =

Single by James Brown

from the album A Soulful Christmas
- B-side: "Believers Shall Enjoy (Non Believers Shall Suffer)"
- Released: 1968
- Genre: Soul, Christmas music
- Length: 3:05
- Label: King; 6204
- Songwriter(s): James Brown; Nat Jones
- Producer(s): James Brown

James Brown charting singles chronology
"Goodbye My Love" (1968)	"Tit for Tat (Ain't No Taking Back)" (1968)	"Give It Up or Turnit a Loose" (1969)

Audio video
- "Tit For Tat (Ain't No Taking Back)" on YouTube

"Tit for Tat (Ain't No Taking Back)" is a Christmas song recorded by James Brown. Released as a single in 1968, it charted #86 Pop.
