= A Soulful Christmas =

Studio album by James Brown
- Released: November 1968
- Recorded: August 7, 1968 ("Say It Loud – I'm Black and I'm Proud"); October 7–10, 1968 (remainder of titles)
- Studio: Vox Studios (Los Angeles, California) ("Say It Loud – I'm Black and I'm Proud"); King Studios (Cincinnati, Ohio) (remainder of titles)
- Genre: Funk, Christmas
- Length: 34:29
- Label: King; 1040
- Producer: James Brown

James Brown chronology
| Thinking About Little Willie John and a Few Nice Things (1968) | A Soulful Christmas (1968) | Say It Loud – I'm Black and I'm Proud (1969) |

Singles from Say It Loud – I'm Black and I'm Proud
- 1. "Say It Loud – I'm Black and I'm Proud" Released: September 1968; 2. "Tit for Tat (Ain't No Taking Back)" Released: December 1968; 3. "Let’s Unite the Whole World at Christmas" Released: December 1968

Professional ratings
Review scores
| Source | Rating |
|---|---|
| AllMusic | 3/5 stars |
| The Rolling Stone Album Guide | 2/5 stars |

A Soulful Christmas is the 22nd studio album and second Christmas album by American musician James Brown. The album was released in November of 1968, by King Records. It was the fifth album that Brown had released that year.

== Track listing ==
| No. | Title | Writer(s) | Length |
|---|---|---|---|
| 1. | "Santa Claus Go Straight to the Ghetto" | Alfred Ellis, Charles Bobbit, Hank Ballard | 3:02 |
| 2. | "Santa Claus, Santa Claus" | Charles Bobbit, Nat Jones | 4:04 |
| 3. | "Believers Shall Enjoy (Non Believers Shall Suffer)" | Bud Hobgood, Nat Jones | 2:16 |
| 4. | "Soulful Christmas" | Alfred Ellis, Charles Bobbit, Hank Ballard | 3:08 |
| 5. | "Tit for Tat (Ain't No Taking Back)" | Charles Bobbit, Nat Jones | 3:06 |
| 6. | "Christmas is Coming" | Bud Hobgood, Nat Jones | 2:39 |
| 7. | "Say It Loud – I'm Black and I'm Proud, Pts. 1 & 2" | James Brown | 4:48 |
| 8. | "In the Middle, Pt. 1" | Bud Hobgood, Nat Jones | 2:44 |
| 9. | "Let's Unite the Whole World at Christmas" | Charles Bobbit, Nat Jones | 2:45 |
| 10. | "You Know It" | Alfred Ellis, Bud Hobgood | 2:22 |
| 11. | "Santa Claus Gave Me a Brand New Start" | Bud Hobgood, Nat Jones | 3:49 |

== Personnel ==
- James Brown – lead vocals
- Waymon Reed – trumpet
- Richard "Kush" Griffith – trumpet
- Fred Wesley – trombone
- Levi Rasbury – valve trombone
- Alfred "Pee Wee" Ellis – alto saxophone, organ
- Maceo Parker – tenor saxophone, piano
- St. Clair Pinckney – baritone saxophone, tenor saxophone
- Richard Jones – violin
- Marilyn Jones – violin
- Sylvia Medford – violin
- Jimmy Nolen – guitar
- Alfonzo Kellum – guitar, bass
- "Sweet" Charles Sherrell – bass
- Gene Redd – vibes
- Clyde Stubblefield – drums
- Nate Jones – drums
