= I Guess I'll Have to Cry, Cry, Cry =

Single by James Brown

from the album Say It Loud – I'm Black and I'm Proud
- B-side: "Just Plain Funk"
- Released: 1968
- Genre: Soul
- Length: 3:50
- Label: King; 6141
- Songwriter(s): James Brown
- Producer(s): James Brown

James Brown charting singles chronology
"America Is My Home - Pt. 1" (1968)	"I Guess I'll Have to Cry, Cry, Cry" (1968)	"Say It Loud - I'm Black and I'm Proud (Part 1)" (1968)

Audio video
- "I Guess I'll Have To Cry Cry Cry" on YouTube

"I Guess I'll Have to Cry, Cry, Cry" is a song written and performed by James Brown. Released as a single in 1968, it charted #15 R&B and #55 Pop.

This song is noted as the last single by Brown to give label credit to his vocal group, the Famous Flames. Although they technically stopped singing on Brown's singles in 1964, the Flames, Bobby Byrd, Bobby Bennett, and Lloyd Stallworth, were still together, touring as a live performance group with Brown, and Byrd continued to sing on record with him. In 1968, however, the Flames all left Brown, citing monetary differences, and although Byrd returned 18 months later, the other members never returned. All of Brown's King Records singles from this point on, starting with Say It Loud – I'm Black and I'm Proud, gave him sole label credit.

The Wailers recorded a reggae version of the song under the title "My Cup" on their 1970 album Soul Rebels.
