= I Don't Want Nobody to Give Me Nothing =

"I Don't Want Nobody to Give Me Nothing (Open Up the Door, I'll Get It Myself) (Part 1)"

Single by James Brown
- B-side: "I Don't Want Nobody to Give Me Nothing (Open Up the Door, I'll Get It Myself) (Part 2)"
- Released: March 1969
- Recorded: February 23, 1969, Lafevere Studios, Atlanta, GA
- Genre: Funk
- Length: 3:05 (Part 1); 2:50 (Part 2)
- Label: King; 6224
- Songwriter(s): James Brown
- Producer(s): James Brown

James Brown charting singles chronology
"Soul Pride (Part 1)" (1969)	"I Don't Want Nobody to Give Me Nothing (Open Up the Door, I'll Get It Myself) (Part 1)" (1969)	"The Popcorn" (1969)

Audio video
- "I Don't Want Nobody To Give Me Nothing (Open Up The Door I'll Get It Myself) (Pt. 1)" on YouTube

"I Don't Want Nobody to Give Me Nothing (Open Up the Door, I'll Get It Myself)" is a funk song written and recorded by James Brown. It was released as a two-part single, which charted #3 R&B and #20 Pop. The single version of the song did not receive an album release until the compilation Foundations of Funk – A Brand New Bag, but a live recording was included on Brown's 1970 album Sex Machine.

The track was sampled by Ice-T in his song "Power" and also sampled by Ed O.G. and Da Bulldogs in their song "I Got To Have It".
