= Randy Bernsen =

American jazz guitarist (born 1954)

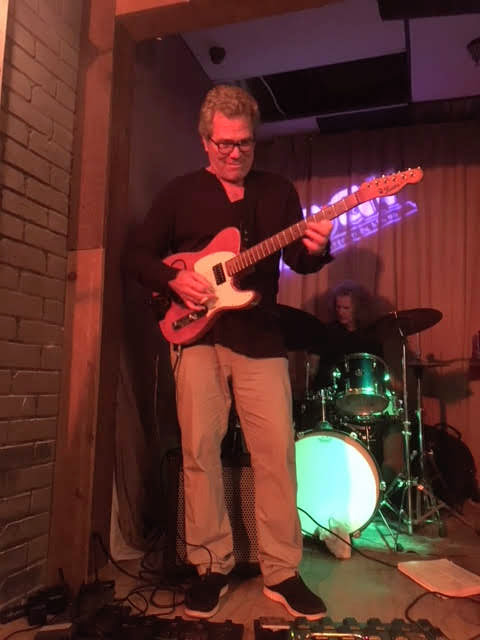
- Randy Bernsen playing the guitar

Background information
- Born: July 15, 1954 (age 72); Needham, Massachusetts, U.S.
- Genre: Jazz fusion
- Occupation: Musician
- Instrument: Guitar
- Years active: 1980s–present
- Website: randybernsen.com

Randy Bernsen (born July 15, 1954) is an American jazz guitarist.

== Career ==
Bernsen was born in Needham, Massachusetts and grew up in Florida. He attended high school in Plantation and was active in the clubs of South Florida, starting at age 17. He studied at the University of Miami. During the mid-1970s, he was a part of the Peter Graves Orchestra, which played in Bachelors III with Jaco Pastorius. In 1977, he was a part of Blood, Sweat & Tears. Bernsen's debut album, Music for People, Planets & Washing Machines (1986), featured numerous greats of fusion jazz, including Urszula Dudziak, Bob James, Herbie Hancock, Jaco Pastorius and Peter Erskine. After good reviews, Bernsen managed to sign up for the follow-up album, Mo' Wasabi, with Wayne Shorter, Michael Brecker, Marcus Miller, Steve Gadd, and Toots Thielemans.

Bernsen has toured since the 1990s with his own groups from Fort Lauderdale. Occasionally he was on concert tours in Europe, Southeast Asia and Mexico. In 1992, he was involved in Joe Zawinul's album Lost Tribes. In 2003 he recorded and edited a tribute to Jaco Pastorius, Word of Mouth Revisited, with the Peter Graves Orchestra, followed in 2006 by The World is Out. Tom Lord recorded 42 recordings with Bernsen between 1979 and 2006. He can also be heard on albums by Silvano Monasterios, Dan Bonsanti, Mike Levine, Mark Colby and Jürgen Attig.

Bernsen has also been a professional private pilot since 1998, qualified on Learjets, Jetstar, PC-12 and Hondajet.

== Discography ==
=== Albums ===
- Music for Planets, People & Washing Machines (Amc, 1984)
- Mo' Wasabi (Zebra, 1986)
- Paradise Citizens (Zebra, 1988)
- Calling Me Back Home (101 South, 1993)
- Live @ Tavern 213 with John Yarling, Pete Sebastian (1997)
- Live in San Miguel (2001)
- Be Still and Know (2004)
- Angels we have heard on High (2005)
- AppTeaser with David Nizri, Uzi Nizri (self-released, 2012)
- Grace Notes (self-released, 2015)
- Heart, Mind and Soul (self-released, 2023)
- Joy To The World (self-released, 2024)
- Gifts of the Spirit (self-released, 2024)

=== Single download ===
- "Folksy" (2010)
- "Come Together" (2011)
- "Revelation 5:1" (2019)
- "Billy Gate Blues" (2019)
- "Abba Father" (2020)
- "Alone Together (Again)" (2021)
