= Jaco Pastorius (album) =

Studio album by Jaco Pastorius
- Released: Late April 1976
- Recorded: October 1975
- Studio: Camp Colomby Studios, Columbia Recording Studios C&B, New York City
- Genre: Jazz fusion, post-bop, funk
- Length: 42:09 / 55:13 (remastered edition with bonus tracks)
- Label: Epic/Legacy (Sony)
- Producer: Bobby Colomby

Jaco Pastorius chronology
Jaco (1974)	Jaco Pastorius (1976)	Word of Mouth (1981)

Professional ratings
Review scores
Source	Rating
AllMusic	5/5 stars
Sputnikmusic	3/5 stars
The Rolling Stone Jazz Record Guide	3/5 stars
The Penguin Guide to Jazz Recordings	3.5/4 stars

Jaco Pastorius is the debut solo album by Jaco Pastorius, released in 1976 by Epic Records. The album was produced by Bobby Colomby, drummer and original member of Blood, Sweat & Tears.

== Track listing ==
All tracks composed by Jaco Pastorius except where indicated.

No.	Title	Writer(s)	Length
1.	"Donna Lee"	Miles Davis	2:27
2.	"Come On, Come Over (featuring Sam & Dave)"	Pastorius, Bob Herzog	3:54
3.	"Continuum"		4:33
4.	"Kuru / Speak Like a Child"	Pastorius, Herbie Hancock	7:43
5.	"Portrait of Tracy"		2:22
6.	"Opus Pocus"		5:30
7.	"Okonkolé Y Trompa"	Pastorius, Don Alias	4:25
8.	"(Used to Be a) Cha-Cha"		8:57
9.	"Forgotten Love"		2:14
Total length:			42:09

Bonus tracks on 2000 reissue:

No.	Title	Length
10.	"(Used to Be a) Cha-Cha (alternate take)"	8:49
11.	"6/4 Jam"	7:45
Total length:		55:13

== Personnel ==
1. "Donna Lee" (Charlie Parker or Miles Davis) – 2:27

- Jaco Pastorius – electric bass
- Don Alias – congas

2. "Come On, Come Over" (featuring Sam & Dave) (Jaco Pastorius, Bob Herzog) – 3:54

- Jaco Pastorius – electric bass
- Don Alias – congas
- Herbie Hancock – Hohner clavinet, Fender Rhodes electric piano
- Narada Michael Walden – drums
- Sam Moore – vocals
- Dave Prater – vocals
- Randy Brecker – trumpet
- Ron Tooley – trumpet
- Peter Graves – bass trombone
- David Sanborn – alto sax
- Michael Brecker – tenor sax
- Howard Johnson – baritone sax

3. "Continuum" (Jaco Pastorius) – 4:33

- Jaco Pastorius – electric bass
- Herbie Hancock – Fender Rhodes electric piano
- Alex Darqui – Fender Rhodes electric piano
- Lenny White – drums
- Don Alias – congas

4. "Kuru/Speak Like a Child" (Jaco Pastorius, Herbie Hancock) – 7:43

- Jaco Pastorius – electric bass
- Herbie Hancock – piano
- Don Alias – congas, bongos
- Bobby Economou – drums
- David Nadien – violin
- Harry Lookofsky – violin
- Paul Gershman – violin
- Joe Malin – violin
- Harry Cykman – violin
- Harold Kohon – violin
- Stewart Clarke – viola
- Manny Vardi – viola
- Julian Barber – viola
- Charles McCracken – cello
- Kermit Moore – cello
- Beverly Lauridsen – cello
- Michael Gibbs – string arrangement

5. "Portrait of Tracy" (Jaco Pastorius) – 2:22

- Jaco Pastorius – electric bass

6. "Opus Pocus" (Jaco Pastorius) – 5:30

- Jaco Pastorius – electric bass
- Wayne Shorter – soprano sax
- Herbie Hancock – Fender Rhodes electric piano
- Othello Molineaux – steel drums
- Leroy Williams – steel drums
- Lenny White – drums
- Don Alias – percussion

7. "Okonkolé y Trompa" (Jaco Pastorius, Don Alias) – 4:25

- Jaco Pastorius – electric bass
- Peter Gordon – French horn
- Don Alias – okonkolo, iya, congas, afuche

8. "(Used to Be a) Cha Cha" (Jaco Pastorius) – 8:57

- Jaco Pastorius – electric bass
- Hubert Laws – piccolo, flute
- Herbie Hancock – piano
- Lenny White – drums
- Don Alias – congas

9. "Forgotten Love" (Jaco Pastorius) – 2:14

- Jaco Pastorius – electric bass
- Herbie Hancock – piano
- David Nadien – violin
- Harry Lookofsky – violin
- Paul Gershman – violin
- Joe Malin – violin
- Harry Cykman – violin
- Harold Kohon – violin
- Matthew Raimondi – violin
- Max Pollinkoff – violin
- Arnold Black – violin
- Stewart Clarke – viola
- Manny Vardi – viola
- Julian Barber – viola
- Al Brown – viola
- Charles McCracken – cello
- Kermit Moore – cello
- Beverly Lauridsen – cello
- Alan Shulman – cello
- Richard Davis – bass
- Homer Mensch – bass
- Michael Gibbs – string arrangement, conductor

Bonus tracks on the 2007 reissue

10. "(Used to Be a) Cha-Cha" (alternate take, previously unreleased) (Jaco Pastorius) – 8:49

- same as for track 8

11. "6/4 Jam" (previously unreleased) – 7:45

- Jaco Pastorius – electric bass
- Herbie Hancock – Fender Rhodes electric piano
- Lenny White – drums
- Don Alias – congas

== See also ==
- Jaco Pastorius discography
