= Othello Molineaux =

- Born: 1939; Longdenville, Trinidad and Tobago
- Genres: Jazz
- Occupation: Musician
- Instrument: Steelpan
- Years active: 1970s–present

Othello Molineaux (born 1939) is a jazz steelpan player who spent much of his early career with Jaco Pastorius. He was among the earliest musicians to adapt the steelpan to jazz. He has worked with Monty Alexander, Chicago, and David Johansen.

== Career ==
Othello Molineaux was born into a family of musicians, with his mother a piano teacher and his father a violinist. He began studying piano at a young age and took up the steelpan at the age of eleven. He left Trinidad in 1969, first beginning a career as a pianist while also continuing to play the steelpan. Molineaux formed a group that blended steelpan and conventional instruments, eventually taking the group to Miami in 1971 where he met bassist Jaco Pastorius. Molineaux performed on Pastorius's 1976 debut album - a breakthrough that brought him into the spotlight in the jazz fusion scene. He soon gained international recognition, performing, recording and touring with major figures in jazz including Dizzy Gillespie, Herbie Hancock, Monty Alexander, Weather Report, Joe Zawinul, Ahmad Jamal, and many others.

Molineaux is widely recognized in jazz as having elevated the steelpan to the status of a being serious lead instrument, rather than simply being relegated to a lesser side role in the rhythm section. He was among the first steelpan players to perform bebop repertoire fluently, taking solos and often delivering long, intricate improvisations. Among his best known collaborations are his work with Jaco Pastorius, with whom he recorded extensively; Molineaux appears on nearly all of Pastorius's albums. Molineaux's playing became such an important part of Pastorius's arrangements that Pastorius built his 1982 album Holiday for Pans largely as a showcase for the steelpan, with Molineaux featured throughout. He was also a regular member of Pastorius's touring band and was featured in the Word of Mouth tour.

Molineaux began his solo career in 1993 with the album It's About Time, released on the Big World Music label. He also collaborated with Habana Abierta on the album Boomerang (2006).

== Discography ==
=== As leader ===
- Happy Talk (Lob, 1980)
- It's About Time (Big World Music, 1993)

=== As sideman ===
With Monty Alexander

- Ivory & Steel (Concord Picante, 1980)
- Jamboree (Concord Picante, 1988)
- Caribbean Circle (Chesky, 1992)

With Randy Bernsen

- Music for Planets, People & Washing Machines (Zebra, 1985)
- Mo' Wasabi (Zebra, 1986)
- Paradise Citizens (Zebra, 1988)
- Calling Me Back Home (101 South, 1993)

With Jaco Pastorius

- Jaco Pastorius (Epic, 1976)
- Word of Mouth (Warner Bros., 1981)
- Twins I Aurex Jazz Festival '82 (Warner Bros., 1982)
- Twins II Aurex Jazz Festival '82 (Warner Bros., 1982)
- Invitation (Warner Bros., 1983)
- Holiday for Pans (Sound Hills, 1993)
- The Birthday Concert (Warner Bros., 1995)
- Twins I & II: Live in Japan 1982 (Warner Bros., 1999)
- Holiday for Pans: Full Complete Sessions (Sound Hills, 1999)
- Word of Mouth Band 1983 Japan Tour (Rhino, 2012)
- Modern American Music...Period! The Criteria Sessions (Omnivore, 2014)
- Then & Now (Rhino/Warner, 2016)
- Truth, Liberty & Soul (Resonance, 2017)

With others

- Carles Benavent, Fenix (Nuevos Medios, 1997)
- Debbie Cameron, Be with Me (BMG/Ricochet/RCA Victor, 1996)
- Chicago, Chicago X (Columbia, 1976)
- Eliane Elias, A Long Story (Manhattan, 1991)
- Ahmad Jamal, Nature: The Essence Part III (Birdology/Atlantic, 1998)
- David Johansen, Here Comes the Night (Blue Sky, 1981)
- Jorge Pardo, Huellas (Cabra Road, 2012)
- Roberto Perera, Passions, Illusions & Fantasies (101 South, 1993)
- Michal Urbaniak, Ecstasy (Marlin, 1978)
