= Jaco Pastorius =

American jazz bassist (1951–1987)

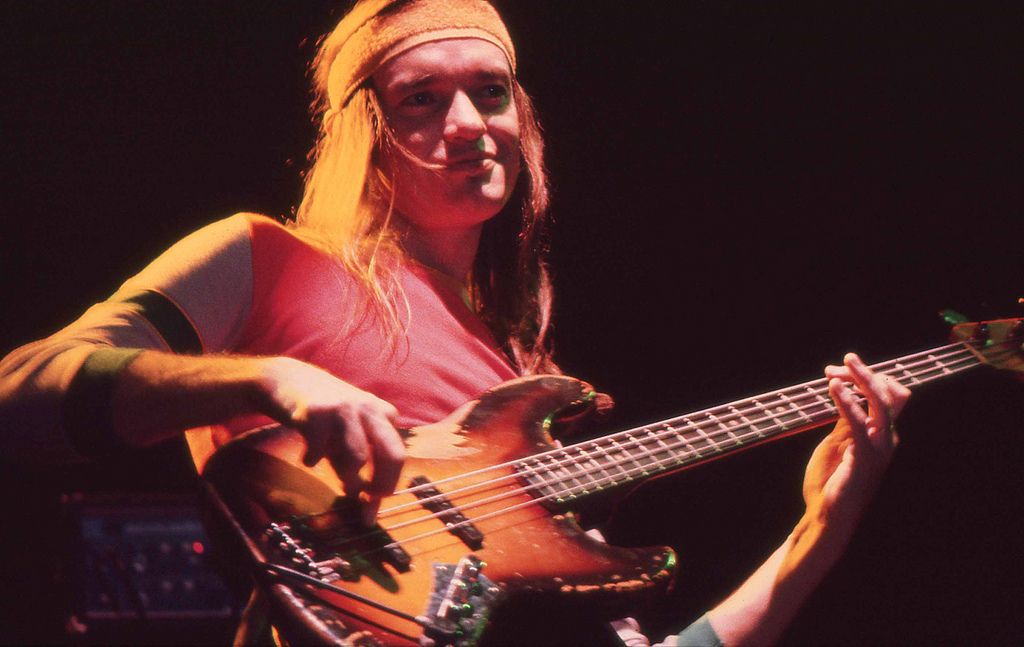
- Pastorius performing in 1980

Background information
- Born: John Francis Anthony Pastorius III; December 1, 1951; Norristown, Pennsylvania, U.S.
- Died: September 21, 1987 (aged 35) Fort Lauderdale, Florida, U.S.
- Genres: Jazz; fusion; funk; post-bop
- Occupations: Musician; composer; arranger; producer
- Instruments: Bass guitar; double bass; keyboards; drums; vocals
- Years active: 1966–1987
- Labels: Epic; Warner Bros.; Columbia; ECM; CBS; Elektra
- Formerly of: Weather Report
- Website: jacopastorius.com

John Francis Anthony Pastorius III, also known as Jaco Pastorius (/ˈdʒɑːkoʊ pæˈstɔːriəs/ JAH-koh pass-TOR-ee-əss; December 1, 1951 – September 21, 1987), was an American jazz bassist, composer, and producer. Widely regarded as one of the greatest and most influential bassists of all time, Pastorius recorded albums as a solo artist, band leader, and as a member of the jazz fusion group Weather Report from 1976 to 1981. He also collaborated with numerous artists, including Herbie Hancock, Pat Metheny and Joni Mitchell.

His bass style was influenced by funk and employed the use of fretless bass, lyrical solos, bass chords and innovative use of harmonics. As of 2017, he was the only one of seven bassists inducted into the DownBeat Jazz Hall of Fame to have been known for their work on the electric bass, and he has been lauded as among the best bassists of all time.

Pastorius suffered from drug addiction and mental health issues and, despite his widespread acclaim, over the latter part of his life he had problems holding down jobs due to his unreliability. In frequent financial difficulties, he was often homeless in the mid-1980s. He died in 1987 as a result of injuries sustained in a beating outside a South Florida after-hours nightclub.

Since his death in 1987, his work has continued to be widely influential. He was elected to the DownBeat Hall of Fame in 1988, and was the subject of the 2014 documentary film Jaco.

== Early life and education ==
Pastorius was born December 1, 1951, in Norristown, Pennsylvania, the oldest of three boys born to Stephanie Catherine (née Haapala; 1925–2001), who was of Finnish descent, and musician John Francis Pastorius Jr. (1922–2004), a singer and jazz drummer of Italian and German descent, who spent much of his time on the road. His family moved to Oakland Park near Fort Lauderdale when he was eight. Early American abolitionist Francis Daniel Pastorius is his ancestor.

The origin of Pastorius' nickname, "Jaco", is disputed. There is an interview with Jaco's father, Jack Pastorius, that took place in 2001 hosted by Bob Miles. Jack says that he was given the nickname during his service in the Navy. He later began calling Pastorius by this nickname in his early childhood. In the documentary Jaco, Pastorius' brother said that their mother came up with the nickname. It is also believed that the nickname was partially influenced by his love for sports as well as the umpire Jocko Conlan. In 1974, he began spelling it "Jaco" after it was misspelled by his neighbor, pianist Alex Darqui. His brother called him "Mowgli" after the wild boy in The Jungle Book because he was energetic and spent much of his time shirtless on the beach, climbing trees, running through the woods, and swimming in the ocean. He attended St. Clement's Catholic School in Wilton Manors, Florida, and was an altar boy at St. Clement's Church. His confirmation name was Anthony. He was intensely competitive and excelled at baseball, basketball, and football. He played drums until he injured his wrist playing football when he was thirteen. The damage was severe enough to warrant corrective surgery and inhibited his ability to play the drums.

By age 17, Pastorius began appreciating jazz and had saved enough money to buy an upright bass. Its deep, mellow tone appealed to him, though it strained his finances. He had difficulty maintaining the instrument, which he attributed to the humidity in Florida. When he woke one day to find it had cracked, he traded it for a 1962 Fender Jazz Bass.

During his teens, he played bass guitar for Wayne Cochran and the C.C. Riders.

In the early 1970s, Pastorius taught bass at the University of Miami, where he befriended jazz guitarist Pat Metheny, who was on the school's faculty. With Paul Bley and Bruce Ditmas, Pastorius and Metheny recorded an untitled album, Jaco in 1974. Pastorius then played on Metheny's debut album, Bright Size Life (ECM, 1976). He recorded his debut solo album, Jaco Pastorius (Epic, 1976), with Michael Brecker, Randy Brecker, Lenny White, Herbie Hancock, Hubert Laws, Sam & Dave, David Sanborn, and Wayne Shorter.

== Career ==
=== Weather Report ===
Before recording his debut album, Pastorius attended a concert in Miami by the jazz fusion band Weather Report. After the concert, he approached keyboardist Joe Zawinul, who led the band. As was his habit, he introduced himself by saying, "I'm John Francis Pastorius III. I'm the greatest bass player in the world." While Zawinul didn't bite that night, upon later listening to an early mix of Pastorius' 1976 self-titled solo album, he realized that Pastorius had considerable skill.

After bassist Alphonso Johnson left Weather Report, Zawinul asked Pastorius to join the band. Pastorius made his band debut on the album Black Market (Columbia, 1976), in which he shared the bass chair with Johnson. Pastorius was fully established as sole band bass player for the recording of Heavy Weather (Columbia, 1977), which contained the Grammy-nominated hit "Birdland".

During his time with Weather Report, Pastorius began abusing alcohol and illegal drugs, which exacerbated existing mental problems and led to erratic behavior. He left Weather Report in 1982 because of clashes with tour commitments for his other projects, plus a growing dissatisfaction with Zawinul's synthesized and orchestrated approach to the band's music.

=== Word of Mouth ===
Warner Bros. signed Pastorius to a favorable contract in the late 1970s based on his groundbreaking skill and his star quality, which they hoped would lead to large sales. He used this contract to set up his Word of Mouth big band, which consisted of Chuck Findley on trumpet; Howard Johnson on tuba; Wayne Shorter, Michael Brecker, and Tom Scott on reeds; Toots Thielemans on harmonica; Kenwood Dennard, Peter Erskine and Jack DeJohnette on drums; and Don Alias on percussion. This was the group that recorded his second solo album, Word of Mouth (Warner Bros., 1981).

In 1982, Pastorius toured with Word of Mouth as a 21-piece big band. While in Japan, to the alarm of his band members, he shaved his head, painted his face black, and threw his bass guitar into Hiroshima Bay. He was diagnosed with bipolar disorder in late 1982 after the tour. Pastorius had shown signs of bipolar disorder years before his diagnosis, but these signs were dismissed as eccentricities, character flaws, and by Pastorius himself as a normal part of his freewheeling personality.

Despite attention in the press, Word of Mouth sold poorly. Pastorius and Word of Mouth had finished recording Holiday for Pans by 1982, but while this was intended to be his next solo album, Warner Bros. was unimpressed by the demo tapes and refused to release it. In its place, the label released Invitation (1983), a live recording from the Word of Mouth tour of Japan. As alcohol and drug problems dominated his life, he had trouble finding work and wound up becoming homeless. In 1985, while filming an instructional video (Modern Electric Bass), Pastorius told the interviewer, Jerry Jemmott, that although he had been praised often for his ability, he wished that someone would give him a job. However, the same year, he gave a much praised concert in Brussels, Belgium with Toots Thielemans.

=== Stage presence and bass techniques ===
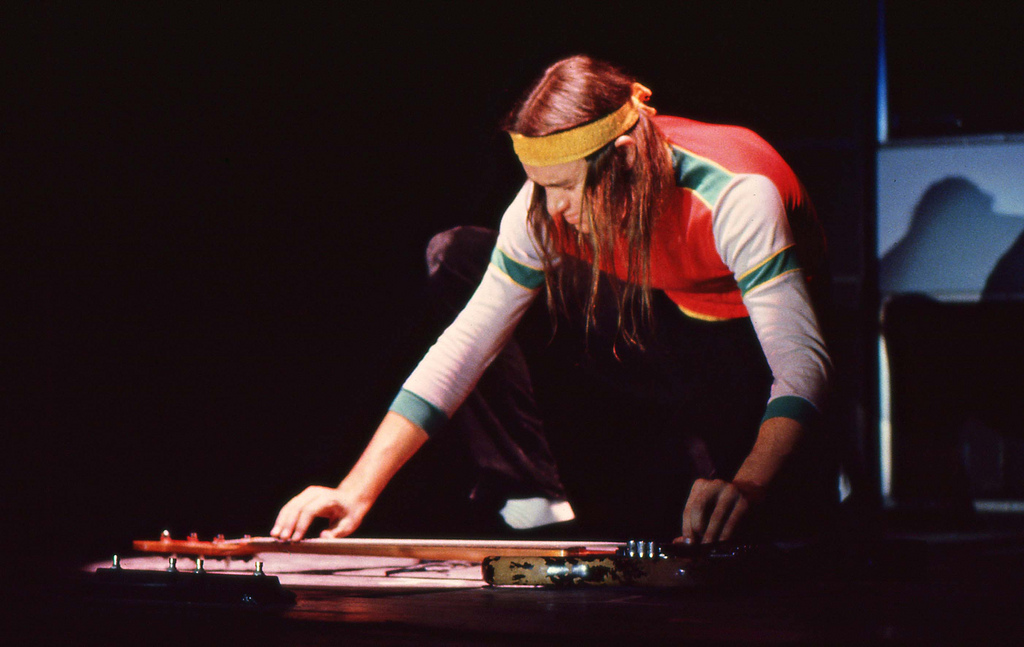
- Pastorius playing "Portrait of Tracy"
- Jaco Pastorius, "Portrait of Tracy" from Jaco Pastorius (1976) Sample from "Portrait of Tracy" with extensive use of harmonics.

Until about 1970, most jazz bassists played the upright bass, also known as the double bass. At the time, with few exceptions (such as the bass players in the trios Bill Evans led), bassists typically remained in the background with the drummer, forming the rhythm section, while the saxophonist, trumpeter, or vocalist handled the melody and led the band. Pastorius had other ideas for the bass player. He played an electric bass from which he had removed the frets. He played fast and loud, sang, and did flips. He spread powder on the stage so he could dance like James Brown. He joked around and talked to the crowd. A self-described Florida beach bum, he often went barefoot and shirtless. He was tall, lean, and strong, and for someone who played sports the nickname "Jocko" fit. His thumbs were "double jointed" and his fingers were long and thin.

After being taught about artificial harmonics, he added them to his technique and repertoire. Natural harmonics, also known as open string harmonics, are played by lightly touching the string with the fretting/fingering hand while plucking the string, resulting in a note that rings, somewhat like a bell. Artificial harmonics, also called false harmonics, involve fretting with the left hand as usual while using a finger or thumb of the right hand at another fret, simultaneously playing and stopping the note.) An often-cited example is the melody to "Birdland".

He used virtuosic bass lines which combined Afro-Cuban rhythms, inspired by the likes of Cachao Lopez, with R&B to create 16th-note funk lines syncopated with ghost notes. He played these with a "movable anchor" thumb technique on the right hand, anchoring on the bridge pickup while playing on the E and A strings and muting the E string with his thumb while playing on higher strings. Examples include "Come On, Come Over" from the album Jaco Pastorius and "The Chicken" from The Birthday Concert.

Another characteristic of Jaco's playing was his use of the octave technique which is very often used with slap bass. Jaco's use of the technique with fingerstyle was revolutionary at the time, since previously it had only really been used on guitars. This technique is demonstrated on the tracks "Portrait of Tracy" from Jaco Pastorius and on "Birdland" from Heavy Weather. Another aspect of his playing was the heavy use of chromatic runs; these were played with immense speed and precision and became very characteristic of his style. These can be heard on "Opus Pocus" from Jaco Pastorius, and "Port of Entry" from Night Passage.

== Influences ==
Pastorius's influences were diverse. He was influenced by electric bassists, such as James Jamerson, Chuck Rainey, Jerry Jemmot, Paul McCartney, Tommy Cogsbill, Duck Dunn, Rocco Prestia, and Harvey Brooks; and upright bassists, such as Ron Carter, Paul Chambers, Charles Mingus, Gary Peacock, and Dave Holland. First learning on upright bass, these artists laid the framework of Jaco's playing, providing him a grounded traditional jazz style. Despite being very different from Jaco's style, these artists provided him fundamental swing feel and understanding of harmonic movement. Influences also came from jazz and rock soloists, such as John Coltrane, Cannonball Adderley, Miles Davis, Jimi Hendrix, and Charlie Parker. Jimi Hendrix was especially important in Jaco's development as a bassist. Hendrix had a wild stage presence and is known to have pushed the boundaries of what an electric guitar can sound like. Jaco adopted both of these traits himself, known for his unique stage presence, many also give him credit for revolutionizing role of the bass guitar in a band. Jazz and classical composers, such as Duke Ellington, Igor Stravinsky, and J. S. Bach, and singers and bands, such as the Beatles, Frank Sinatra, Santana, Otis Redding, and Ray Charles.

The Urantia Book inspired Pastorius's track "Havona", which appears on the Weather Report album Heavy Weather. The track is known for its ethereal vibes, as well as Jaco's fast sixteenth note bass lines and solo. In the book, Havona is described as an eternal, perfect universe located at the center of all existence.

== Equipment ==
=== Bass of Doom ===
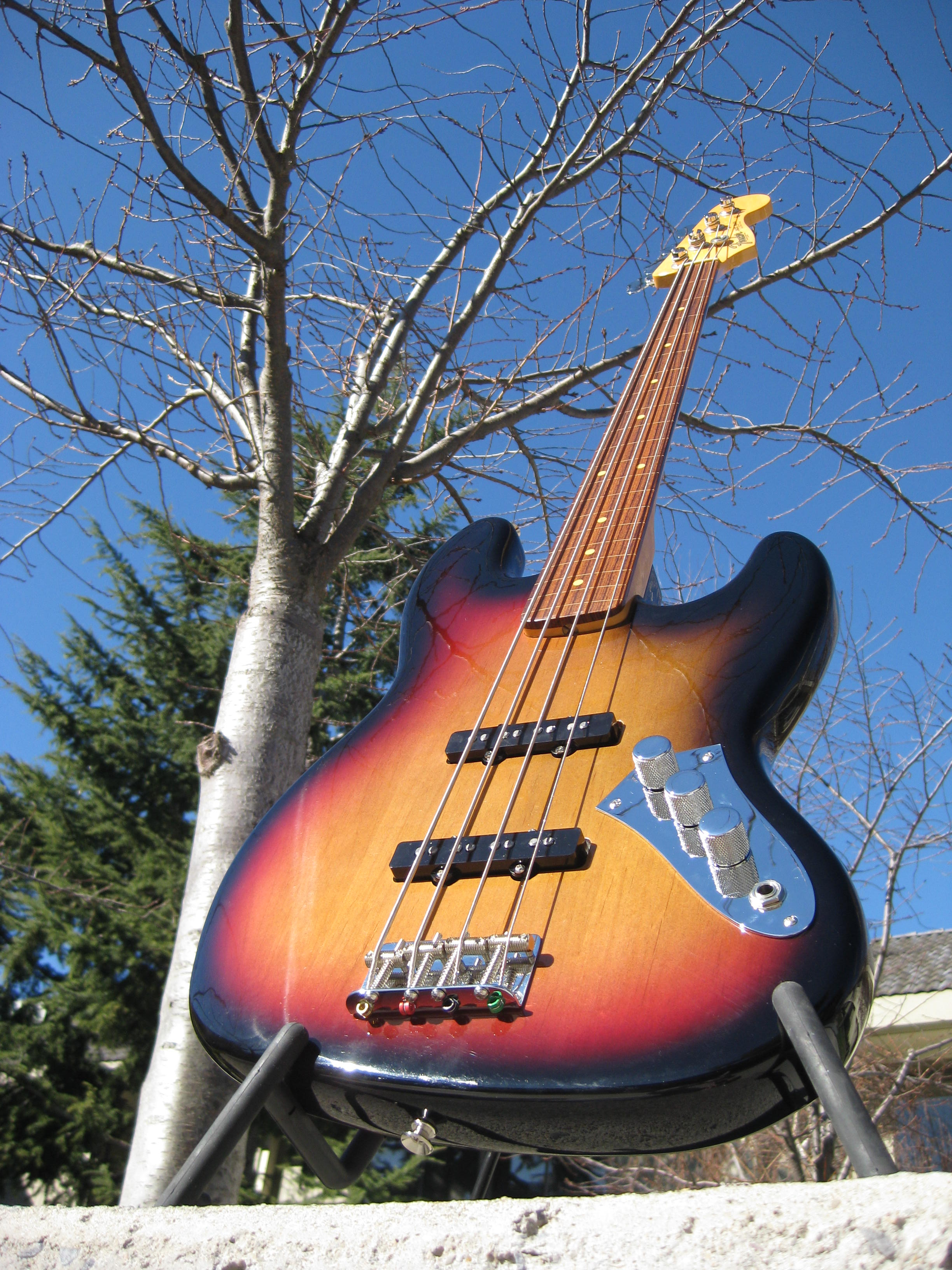
A replica of Pastorius' "Bass of Doom"

Pastorius played a number of Fender Jazz Basses over the years, but the most famous was a 1962 Jazz Bass that he called the Bass of Doom. When he was 21, Pastorius acquired the bass, which was modified by removing the frets giving him a unique sound and vast possibilities. It is unclear when the frets were removed, as his recollections varied over the years. One story is that he used a common butter knife to remove the frets, and sealed the fretboard with epoxy resin.

As stated and shown in his instructional video Jaco Pastorius: Modern Electric Bass, Pastorius would frequently replace the neck on his Bass of Doom with a fretted Fender Precision Bass neck for two reasons: 1) Because the strings, RotoSound Swing Bass 66 stainless steel strings, would wear down the fingerboard on his fretless neck, and 2) the larger width of the Precision neck helped him to stretch his fingers. He would use the Precision neck for practising and put the fretless neck back on for actual performances.

In 1986, the bass was repaired by luthiers Kevin Kaufman and Jim Hamilton, after it had been broken into many pieces. After the repair Pastorius recorded a session with Mike Stern, then the bass was stolen from a park bench in Manhattan in 1986. It was found in a guitar shop in 2006, but the shop owner refused to give it up. The Pastorius family enlisted lawyers to help but nearly went bankrupt in 2010. Robert Trujillo, bassist for Metallica, considers Pastorius to be one of his heroes, and he felt that the family deserved to have the bass. Trujillo helped pay to have it returned to them. He has used the instrument to record and perform and is its legal custodian.

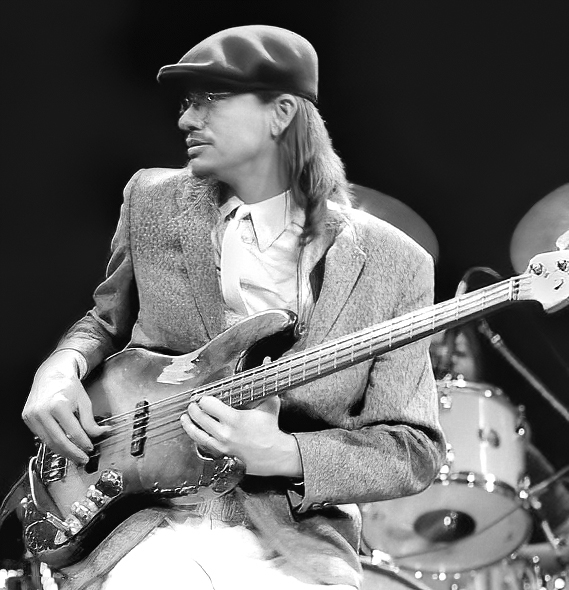
Jaco Pastorius, Jazz at the Opera House, San Francisco CA 2/22/82

Fender began offering a fretless version of its standard Jazz Bass in the mid-1980s, and in 1999 began offering the "Fender Jaco Pastorius Jazz Bass" in its Artist series, and Custom Shop series. These instruments were modelled on the Bass of Doom, with the Custom Shop version featuring a fretboard sealed with epoxy resin. In the 2000s Fender's budget brand Squier offered the "Squier Vintage Modified Fretless Jazz Bass" which was also reminiscent of Jaco's instrument.

Since the 1980s, other companies have offered fretless basses similar to, or modelled on, the Bass of Doom, such as Tokai and Edwards.

=== Amplification and effects ===
Pastorius used the "Variamp" EQ (equalization) controls on his two Acoustic 360 amplifiers (made by the Acoustic Control Corporation) to boost the midrange frequencies, thus accentuating the natural growling tone of his fretless passive Fender Jazz Bass and roundwound string combination. He also controlled his tone color with a rackmount MXR digital delay unit that fed a second Acoustic amp rig.

During the final three years of his life he used Hartke cabinets because of the character of aluminum speaker cones (as opposed to paper speaker cones). These provided a bright, clear sound. He typically used the delay in a chorus-like mode, providing a shimmering stereo doubling effect. He often used the fuzz control built into the Acoustic 360. For the bass solo "Slang/Third Stone From the Sun" on Weather Report's live album 8:30 (1979), Pastorius used the MXR digital delay to layer and loop a chordal figure and then soloed over it; the same technique, with a looped bass riff, can be heard during his solo on the Joni Mitchell concert video Shadows and Light.

== Guest appearances ==
Pastorius appeared as a guest on many albums by other artists, including Ian Hunter of Mott the Hoople, and recorded a solo on the title track of his album All American Alien Boy in 1976. He can be heard on Airto Moreira's album I'm Fine, How Are You? (1977). His signature sound is prominent on Flora Purim's Everyday Everynight (1978), on which he played the bass melody for a Michel Colombier composition entitled "The Hope", and performed bass and vocals on one of his own compositions, entitled "Las Olas". Other recordings included work on four Joni Mitchell albums between 1976 and 1980 (Hejira; Don Juan's Reckless Daughter; Mingus; and Shadows and Light) and Al Di Meola's Land of the Midnight Sun, released in 1976. Near the end of his career, he worked often with guitarist Mike Stern, guitarist Biréli Lagrène, and drummer Brian Melvin.

== Awards and honors ==
Pastorius received two Grammy Award nominations in 1977 for his self-titled debut album: one for Best Jazz Performance by a Group and one for Best Jazz Performance by a Soloist ("Donna Lee"). In 1978, he received a Grammy nomination for Best Jazz Performance by a Soloist for his work on Weather Report's album Heavy Weather.

Bass Player magazine gave him second place on a list of the one hundred greatest bass players of all time, behind James Jamerson. After his death in 1987, he was voted, by readers of DownBeat magazine, to its Hall of Fame, joining bassists Jimmy Blanton, Ray Brown, Ron Carter, Charles Mingus, Charlie Haden, and Milt Hinton.

Marcus Miller said "Jaco's composing was as unique as his playing."

Many musicians have composed songs in his honour, such as Pat Metheny's "Jaco" on the album Pat Metheny Group (1978), "Mr. Pastorius" by Marcus Miller on Miles Davis's album Amandla, and Rod Argent's "Pastorius Mentioned" on his 1978 album Moving Home. Others who have dedicated compositions to him include Randy Brecker, Eliane Elias, Chuck Loeb, John McLaughlin, Bob Moses, Ana Popović, Dave Samuels, and the Yellowjackets.

On December 2, 2007, the day after his birthday, a concert called "20th Anniversary Tribute to Jaco Pastorius" was held at Broward Center for the Performing Arts in Fort Lauderdale, Florida, with performances by the Jaco Pastorius Big Band and appearances by Randy Brecker, Dave Bargeron, Peter Erskine, Jimmy Haslip, Bob Mintzer, Gerald Veasley, Pastorius's sons John and Julius Pastorius, Pastorius's daughter Mary Pastorius, Ira Sullivan, Bobby Thomas Jr., and Dana Paul. Almost twenty years after his death, Fender released the Jaco Pastorius Jazz Bass, a fretless instrument in its Artist Series.

He has been called "arguably the most important and ground-breaking electric bassist in history" and "perhaps the most influential electric bassist today".

William C. Banfield, director of Africana Studies, Music and Society at Berklee College, described Pastorius as one of the few original American virtuosos who defined a musical movement, in addition to Jimi Hendrix, Louis Armstrong, Thelonious Monk, Charlie Christian, Bud Powell, Charlie Parker, Dizzy Gillespie, John Coltrane, Sarah Vaughan, Bill Evans, Charles Mingus, and Wes Montgomery.

A public park is named for, and dedicated to, Jaco in the city he grew up in, Oakland Park, Florida.

== Death ==
On September 11, 1987, Pastorius sneaked onto the stage at a Santana concert at the Sunrise Musical Theater in Sunrise, Florida. Weather Report had been an associated act of Santana in the mid-1970s. After being ejected from the premises, he made his way to the Midnight Bottle Club in Wilton Manors. After reportedly kicking in a glass door, having been refused entrance to the club, he became involved in a violent confrontation with Luc Havan, a club employee who was a martial arts expert. Pastorius was hospitalized for multiple facial fractures and injuries to his right eye and left arm, and fell into a coma. There were encouraging signs that he would come out of the coma and recover, but they soon faded. A brain hemorrhage a few days later led to brain death. He was taken off life support and died on September 21, 1987, at the age of 35, at Broward General Medical Center in Fort Lauderdale. His funeral was held at St. Clement's Catholic Church, Wilton Manors, Florida. Pastorius was buried at Queen of Heaven Cemetery in North Lauderdale, Broward County, Florida.

Havan faced a charge of second-degree murder. He pleaded guilty to manslaughter and was sentenced to twenty-two months in prison and five years' probation. After serving four months in prison, he was paroled for good behavior.

== Legacy ==
The legacy of Jaco Pastorius is one of the most impactful in the world of electric bass in jazz and in general for every genre, and as time passed, his work began to be more appreciated by musicians. Known for his solo career with the self-titled album Jaco Pastorius, the track "Donna Lee" is remembered as showcasing his prowess, feel and speed on the electric bass, a level of skill which had not been seen before. He mentions in an interview that the hardest part of playing Donna Lee "is just to get the strings I’m not playing to shut up." In his contributions to Weather Report, he is remembered for his precise and fast bass lines, played with flash and gusto. The fact that he entered the music scene at the age of only 16 has inspired future musicians. Jaco's legacy shows his skill and trailblazing in the world of jazz and electric bass performance.

Many rock and metal bassists have expressed their admiration for Pastorius, or have cited him as an influence or inspiration to their playing. These bass players include Jeff Ament (Pearl Jam), Michael Anthony (Van Halen, Chickenfoot and Sammy Hagar and the Circle), Frank Bello (Anthrax), Rex Brown (Pantera and Down), Chris Chaney (AC/DC, Jane's Addiction and Slash), Tim Commerford (Rage Against the Machine and Audioslave), Steve Di Giorgio (Testament, Sadus and Death), David Ellefson (Megadeth), Flea (Red Hot Chili Peppers), Tony Franklin (The Firm and Blue Murder), John Myung (Dream Theater), Paulo Jr. (Sepultura), Billy Sheehan (The Winery Dogs, David Lee Roth, Mr. Big and Sons of Apollo), Jeroen Paul Thesseling (Pestilence and Obscura), Robert Trujillo (Metallica), Joey Vera (Armored Saint, Fates Warning and Mercyful Fate), and Alex Webster (Cannibal Corpse).

=== Family ===
Jaco Pastorius met Tracy Lee Sexton in the late 1960s, and the couple wed in August 1970. They welcomed a daughter, Mary Pastorius, in December of that year, and a son, John Francis Pastorius IV, in 1973. The composition "Portrait of Tracy", which appears on the 1976 album Jaco Pastorius, is named after Tracy Lee. The marriage ended in the late 1970s, with their divorce becoming final in early 1979.

In July 1979 Pastorius married girlfriend Ingrid Horn-Müller at Tikal Temple III in Tikal, Guatemala. Twin sons, Julius and Felix Pastorius, were born in 1982. The marriage ended in 1985.

Mary Pastorius is a singer, songwriter and musician. She released an album From Then Until Almost Now in 2007, featuring her brother John Pastorius on drums and cousin David Pastorius as bassist and co-writer. Felix Pastorius is a bassist and bandleader, credited on the album A Rise in the Road by Yellowjackets, on several albums as a member of the Jeff Coffin Mu'tet, and as a member of A$AP Rocky's band.

== Discography ==
As leader/co-leader

- Jaco (with Pat Metheny, Bruce Ditmas, Paul Bley) (1976)
- Jaco Pastorius (1976)
- Word of Mouth (1981)
- Invitation (1983)
- Stuttgart Aria (with Biréli Lagrène) (1986)
