= Runaway (Deee-Lite song) =

Single by Deee-Lite

from the album Infinity Within
- B-side: "Rubber Lover"
- Released: May 28, 1992
- Recorded: 1991
- Genre: House; garage
- Length: 3:54
- Label: Elektra
- Songwriter: Deee-Lite
- Producer: Deee-Lite

Deee-Lite singles chronology
| "Power of Love" (1991) | "Runaway" (1992) | "Bring Me Your Love" (1994) |

Music video
- "Runaway on YouTube

"Runaway" is a song recorded, written and produced by New York City-based group Deee-Lite, released on May 28, 1992 by Elektra Records as the lead single from their second studio album, Infinity Within (1992). It is the group's fourth single to top the US Billboard Dance Club Songs chart. In Europe, the song was a top-10 hit in Greece and a top-20 hit in Finland, as well as peaking at number nine on the UK Dance Singles Chart and number 12 on the European Dance Radio Chart. The accompanying music video for "Runaway" was directed by American filmmaker and artist Gus Van Sant.

== Critical reception ==
Heather Phares from AllMusic named the song one of her "Track Picks" from the Infinity Within album. Larry Flick from Billboard magazine noted that Lady Miss Kier "has evolved into a far more confident diva, while cohorts Super DJ Dmitry and Jungle DJ Towa Towa keep an ear to current sounds while maintaining a reverence for retro funk and disco." Dave Sholin from the Gavin Report felt it "stays in the uptempo groove with that House intensity that's sure to make it a club as well as radio favorite." Melody Maker concluded that "Deee-Lite, along with C&C Music Factory, are still the most up-to-date mainstream American dance act". A reviewer from Music & Media said, "During their absence another weird trio—Army of Lovers—took over the reins. But now the dance loonies are back, although not as odd ball as before and more mainstream."

Alan Jones from Music Week stated, "Still looking outlandish, Deee-Lite slide closer to the dance mainstream with 'Runaway', a hustling garage groover that sounds like it was mixed by either Steve Hurley or Joey Negro, though neither was actually involved." Davydd Chong from the Record Mirror Dance Update described the song as "a reviving breath of fresh air", complimenting its "soothing keyboard riffs" and "candy-encased vocals". Siân Pattenden from Smash Hits gave it a full score of five out of five and named it Best New Single, commenting, "They're back! With a stomping curlicue in the lustrous toupee of pop! Housey backbeat combined with chomping bass and swishy pingy sounds amongst Lady Miss Kier's vocals de gusto". Joe Brown from The Washington Post felt that the "deceptively slight melodic hooks" of "Runaway" "prove infuriatingly tenacious."

== Track listing and formats ==
- German CD maxi-single
1. "Runaway" (Sampladelic Radio Edit) – 3:52
2. "Runaway" (Greyhound Extended Mix) – 5:40
3. "Rubber Lover" (Skin Tight Mix) – 4:29
4. "Runaway" (Masters at Work Dub) – 6:37

== Charts ==
| Chart (1992) | Peak position |
|---|---|
| Australia (ARIA) | 112 |
| Canada Top Singles (RPM) | 70 |
| Europe (European Dance Radio) | 12 |
| Finland (Suomen virallinen lista) | 15 |
| Greece (IFPI) | 10 |
| Switzerland (Schweizer Hitparade) | 25 |
| UK Singles (OCC) | 45 |
| UK Dance (Music Week) | 9 |
| UK Club Chart (Music Week) | 9 |
| US Dance Club Songs (Billboard) | 1 |
