= Call Me (Deee-Lite song) =

Single by Deee-Lite

from the album Dewdrops in the Garden
- Released: 1994
- Genre: Dance; house
- Length: 3:52 (album version)
- Label: Elektra
- Songwriter: Deee-Lite
- Producer: Deee-Lite

Deee-Lite singles chronology
"Bring Me Your Love" (1994)	"Call Me" (1994)

"Call Me" is a song recorded and produced by the American-based group Deee-Lite. It was released by Elektra Records as the fourth single of the group's third studio album, Dewdrops in the Garden (1994), and their sixth and final single to reach the number one position on the US Billboard dance chart, during the week ending February 4, 1995.

== Critical reception ==
Larry Flick from Billboard magazine described it as "a hardcore club offering that places more emphasis on the act's talent for hearty beats than its quirky persona." He added, "Lady Kier's vamps are always a pleasure, but DJs are more likely to dig the double-pack of mixes that dabble in a wide variety of trendy vibes, ranging from pop/house to trance and tribal. Deserves immediate attention." Richard Smith from Melody Maker complimented the song as "quite good".

== Formats and track listings ==
- US CD maxi single
1. Call Me (Sampladelic Mix) 3:52
2. Call Me (Ralphi's Extended LP Mix) 5:06
3. Call Me (Ralphi's Intense Dub Mix) 4:50
4. Call Me (H-Man * 69 Mix) 6:30
5. Call Me (Method One Jungle Remix) 5:50
6. Apple Juice Kissing (Album Version) 3:14)

== Charts ==
Chart (1995)	Peak position
US Dance Club Play (Billboard)	1
US Maxi-Singles Sales (Billboard)	19

== See also ==
- List of Billboard number-one dance singles of 1995
