= World Clique =

Studio album by Deee-Lite
- Released: August 7, 1990
- Recorded: January 1987–May 1990
- Studios: D&D (New York City); Calliope (New York City)
- Genres: House; psychedelia
- Length: 48:19
- Label: Elektra
- Producer: Deee-Lite

Deee-Lite chronology
World Clique (1990)	Infinity Within (1992)

Singles from World Clique
- 1. "Groove Is in the Heart" Released: August 1990; 2. "Power of Love" Released: 1990; 3. "E.S.P." Released: 1991

World Clique is the debut album by American dance music band Deee-Lite, which was released in 1990. The album's first single, "Groove Is in the Heart", was a top-five success on both the US Billboard Hot 100 and UK Singles Chart as well as a No. 1 hit on the US Hot Dance Club Play chart. Three subsequent singles also hit the top ten on the US dance chart, including "Power of Love/Build That Bridge", which also hit No. 1, and "Good Beat".

Guest artists on the album include Bootsy Collins, Q-Tip, Fred Wesley and Maceo Parker. When World Clique was released on compact disc, two bonus tracks were added to the album: "Deee-Lite Theme" and "Build the Bridge".

"E.S.P." contains a sample of actor Bela Lugosi from the 1934 film The Black Cat.

== Critical reception ==
Professional ratings
Review scores
Source	Rating
AllMusic	4.5/5 stars
Chicago Sun-Times	3.5/4 stars
Entertainment Weekly	A−
Los Angeles Times	2.5/5 stars
NME	9/10
Record Mirror	4/5
Rolling Stone	2/5 stars
The Rolling Stone Album Guide	4/5 stars
Select	5/5
Slant Magazine	5/5 stars

In Spin, Steven Daly hailed World Clique as "the debut album of the year" and "an eloquent tableau of '90s possibilities", finding that Deee-Lite "keep the affair on a human scale" and distinguish themselves from other "digital Robin Hoods" by writing their own hooks and refraining from excessive sampling. "While their command of technology is determinedly progressive," wrote Don McLeese of the Chicago Sun-Times, "they use sampling for more than the usual recycling and bring a playfulness beyond the bloodless perfection that has come to characterize computer music." Entertainment Weekly critic Greg Sandow said that Deee-Lite "make dance music that's unpredictable and steadily delirious" and imbue World Clique with "an ironic edge" and their own lyrical and musical "quirks". Record Mirror's Richie Blackmore complimented the group's "refreshing ability to master different dance styles", while Richard Norris commented in Select that the album "sounds like the most fun you've ever had, a fittingly wordly mix of chunky funk, house and soul topped with some of the finest wiggly noises you'll have heard for a while." Helen Mead of NME lauded World Clique as "one of the most varied and inspirational club crossover records ever."

Dennis Hunt of the Los Angeles Times was less impressed, writing that World Clique is "littered with distracting touches and tries too hard to be innovative". Rolling Stone reviewer Arion Berger felt that it features "formulaic well-chosen beats and not-quite-powerful vocals" and comes across as "a selective history of pop culture played as house music and compressed into easily swallowable three-minute bites." The Village Voice's Robert Christgau identified "Good Beat" as the album's sole "choice cut".

Two years after the album's release, Billboard called World Clique an "innovative, media-saturated debut". In a retrospective review for AllMusic, Ned Raggett wrote that frontwoman Lady Miss Kier "has not merely the pipes but the personality to carry something on her own", while producers DJ Dmitry and Towa Tei "come up with a seamless, adept flow throughout, merrily raiding whatever they so choose in the past for their own purposes."

In 2003, Slant Magazine included World Clique in its list, Vital Pop: 50 Essential Pop Albums. Charles Pitter for Zouch notes that album track and single "Groove Is in the Heart" is a "dance classic".

== Commercial performance ==
The album's initial success occurred in the UK, where it peaked at No. 14 on the UK Albums Chart in September 1990. Simultaneously, the album entered the Billboard 200 at No. 180 for the week of September 15 in the US. Fueled by the success of "Groove Is in the Heart", World Clique continued to climb the chart for several weeks, peaking at No. 20 for the week of November 24.

The success of subsequent singles "Power of Love", "Good Beat", and "E.S.P." helped the album to sustain steady sales throughout the following months, with the album achieving RIAA Gold certification in December 1990 and remaining on the Billboard 200 for a total of 41 weeks before falling off the chart in June 1991, following its final chart position at No. 199. World Clique is Deee-Lite's most successful album, outlasting Infinity Within (1992) and Dewdrops in the Garden (1994) on the Billboard 200 chart and outperforming its successors in terms of highest peak position and mainstream exposure and sales.

== Track listing ==
All tracks are written by Deee-Lite, except where noted.

No.	Title	Writer(s)	Length
1.	"Deee-Lite Theme"	Deee-Lite, Herbie Hancock	2:10
2.	"Good Beat"		4:40
3.	"Power of Love"		4:40
4.	"Try Me On... I'm Very You"		5:14
5.	"Smile On"		3:55
6.	"What Is Love?"		3:38
7.	"World Clique"		3:20
8.	"E.S.P."		3:43
9.	"Groove Is in the Heart"	Deee-Lite, Hancock, Jonathan Davis	3:51
10.	"Who Was That?"		4:35
11.	"Deep Ending"		3:47
12.	"Build the Bridge"		4:32

Notes

- "Deee-Lite Theme" and "Build the Bridge" are not present in the LP edition of the album.

== Personnel ==
=== Deee-Lite ===
- Super DJ Dimitry
- Jungle DJ Towa Tei
- The Lady Miss Kier Kirby

=== Additional personnel ===
- Bootsy Collins – additional bass on ("Who Was That?"), additional guitar on ("Smile On"), guitar on ("Try Me"), background vocals on ("Groove Is in the Heart")
- Q-Tip (from A Tribe Called Quest) – rap on ("Groove Is in the Heart")
- Sahirah – background vocals on ("World Clique")
- Sheila Slappy – background vocals on ("World Clique")
- Fred Wesley – trombone on ("Smile On", "Groove Is in the Heart", "Try Me On")
- Maceo Parker – saxophone on ("Smile On", "Groove Is in the Heart", "Try Me On")
- Bill "Chicken on Fire" Coleman – vocals on ("Build the Bridge")

=== Technical ===
- Deee-Lite – producer, arranger, mixing
- Mike "Tweekin" Rogers – additional background vocal production and arrangement, engineer, mixing
- Eddie Sancho – assistant engineer
- Derek Lategan – assistant engineer
- Bob Power – additional engineering
- Herb Powers – mastering
- Bill Coleman – executive producer
- Nick Egan – art direction, design
- Daisy – art direction
- Tom Bouman – design
- Michael Halsband – photography
- Michael Economy – comics
- Tabboo!! – hand lettering

== Charts ==
=== Weekly charts ===
Weekly chart performance for World Clique
Chart (1990–91)	Peak position
Australian Albums (ARIA)	33
Canada Top Albums/CDs (RPM)	15
New Zealand Albums (RMNZ)	30
UK Albums (Official Charts)	14
US Billboard 200	20
US Top R&B/Hip Hop Albums (Billboard)	34

=== Year-end charts ===
1991 year-end chart performance for World Clique
Chart (1991)	Position
Canada Top Albums/CDs (RPM)	96
US Billboard 200	77

== Certifications ==
Certifications for World Clique
Region	Certification	Certified units/sales
Canada (Music Canada)	Platinum	100,000^{^}
United Kingdom (BPI)	Gold	100,000^{^}
United States (RIAA)	Gold	500,000^{^}
^{^} Shipments figures based on certification alone.
