= Infinity Within =

Studio album by Deee-Lite
- Released: June 23, 1992
- Recorded: July–December 1991
- Studios: The Looking Glass Studios (New York City)
- Genre: House
- Length: 60:41
- Label: Elektra
- Producer: Deee-Lite

Deee-Lite chronology
World Clique (1990)	Infinity Within (1992)	Dewdrops in the Garden (1994)

Singles from Infinity Within
- 1. "Runaway" Released: May 28, 1992; 2. "Thank You Everyday" Released: September 17, 1992; 3. "Pussycat Meow" Released: November 16, 1992

Infinity Within is the second studio album by American house and club/dance group Deee-Lite. Released in 1992 on Elektra, the second album, through its lyrical content, instrumentation, and overall tone, showcases the band's political activism as a more literal part of the music than on their debut album, World Clique (1990).

"Runaway", the lead single from the album, is Deee-Lite's fourth single to top the Billboard dance chart, helping to establish their success in the musical genre beyond World Clique.

== Album description ==
With its predecessor subtly focusing on global peace, joy, and unity, Infinity Within is overtly political, as evidenced by the phrase "Let's face it, it's a pro-choice album" appearing on the album cover and more importantly, with outspoken tracks encouraging the protection of the environment ("I Had a Dream I Was Falling through a Hole in the Ozone Layer"), sexual liberation through safe sex ("Rubber Lover"), the failure of the judicial system ("Fuddy Duddy Judge") and the importance of voting ("Vote, Baby, Vote"). The song "Vote, Baby, Vote" was made into a public service announcement which advocated the band's mission for voter registration and their support of the Motor Voter Bill to ease voter registration.

While some music critics may not have recognized it, the move to more heightened social awareness on the second album was not a departure from World Clique, but a natural progression for the band members. Inspired by the I Ching, Infinity Within is meant to be more self-reflective and to counteract the global view of World Clique, which lead singer Lady Kier felt was often misunderstood. She explained the idea behind the album and its title by saying:

The reason why we titled this new album Infinity Within—to balance out [World Clique's] idea of looking outward and thinking about unity—is if you look outward, you should look inward to see what you're doing as an individual. Because people seem to be so passive—I'd like to see people turn their TV sets off and start protesting.

To further show their support of the environment, Deee-Lite pledged a portion of the album's profits to Greenpeace. Additionally, Infinity Within was one of the first Warner Music titles that was issued in an eco-friendly package called the Eco-pak. It was designed in 1991 by Ivy Hill Packaging, at the time a subsidiary of Time Warner, as a more environmentally friendly alternative to the longbox which was often discarded after purchase, and to facilitate proper display of CDs in music retail stores. The eco-pack was displayed in stores unfolded, to display titles in the same manner as longboxes. Upon purchasing a title and removing the plastic shrink wrap, the packaging was folded into the shape of a traditional CD jewel case, similar to a Digipak. By 1993, the use of the longbox was phased out as music retailers began replacing LP-sized sales racks with those to house jewelcase or digipak formats with the locking plastic frames (keepers); thus rendering the Eco-pak, in its original form, obsolete. As a result, Infinity Within is among the few titles ever released with the original Eco-pak design.

== Singles ==
Infinity Within yielded three commercial singles the year of its release. The first single, "Runaway", was released onto CD, cassette, and 12" vinyl in May 1992, three weeks prior to the album's debut. "Runaway" went on to top the Billboard Dance chart, making it Deee-Lite's fourth song to reach #1 on that chart. The commercial release of "Runaway", which was paired with the song "Rubber Lover", went on to top the Billboard Hot Dance Music/Maxi-Single Sales chart as well. The single was accompanied by a music video directed by Gus Van Sant, which received modest airplay from MTV. "Runaway" is the only single from Infinity Within for which a music video was produced.

"Thank You Everyday", the second single from the album, was released onto CD and 12" vinyl in September 1992. The single failed to chart. The third and final single from the album, "Pussycat Meow", was released solely onto 12" vinyl in November 1992. The single climbed to #6 on the Billboard Dance charts and #26 on the Billboard Dance Sales charts. A promotional CD single of "I Had a Dream I was Falling Through a Hole in the Ozone Layer" was released, but no commercial single was.

Aside from the success of "Runaway" on the dance chart, overall the three singles did not have as much impact as those released from World Clique. As such, none of the singles from Infinity Within managed to chart on the Billboard Hot 100.

== Reception ==
Professional ratings
Review scores
Source	Rating
AllMusic	2.5/5 stars
Calgary Herald	B+
Entertainment Weekly	B
Christgau's Consumer Guide	(3-star Honorable Mention)
Rolling Stone	2.5/5 stars
Spin	(favorable)
The Washington Post	(favorable)

The album generally received mixed reviews. Despite a lukewarm response, Robert Christgau gave the album a very positive 3-star honorable mention.

Joe Brown from The Washington Post wrote, "Out to prove they're not just cartoon characters or paper dolls, the retro-Hollywood styled Lady Miss Kier Kirby, Super DJ Dmitry Brill and Jungle DJ Towa "Towa" Tei try for some substance with their style this time out, interlacing the strained zaniness with messages ("Let's face it! It's a pro-choice album!" says the cover). Their concerns are similar to those of the B-52's: safer sex, environmental destruction, voter registration and extraterrestrial contacts. As for the music, recycling is the order of the day - while there's nothing as instantly infectious as "Groove is in the Heart", the band's blend of house Lite, R&B and eclectic sampling is more consistent, and the deceptively slight melodic hooks of "Runaway" and "Heart Be Still" prove infuriatingly tenacious. Kier has developed into a more confident, relaxed singer, and the DJs (plus cameos by bassist Bootsy Collins, hot rap outfit Arrested Development and several ex-JBs) provide perfect music for runway walking or Stairmaster stepping."

== Track listing ==
No.	Title	Writer(s)	Length
1.	"I.F.O. (Identified Flying Object)" (featuring Arrested Development)	Super DJ Dmitry; Lady Miss Kier; Towa Tei; Arrested Development	2:55
2.	"Runaway"	Brill; Kier; Tei	3:54
3.	"Heart Be Still"	Brill; Kier; Tei	4:11
4.	"I Won't Give Up"	Brill; Kier; Tei	4:25
5.	"Vote, Baby, Vote"	Brill; Kier; Tei	0:33
6.	"Two Clouds above Nine" (featuring Jamal-ski)	Brill; Kier; Tei; Jamal-ski	5:09
7.	"Electric Shock"	Brill; Kier; Tei	4:49
8.	"I Had a Dream I Was Falling through a Hole in the Ozone Layer"	Brill; Kier; Tei	5:39
9.	"Fuddy Duddy Judge" (featuring Michael Franti)	Brill; Kier; Tei; Michael Franti; Danny Madden	4:37
10.	"Pussycat Meow"	Brill; Kier; Tei	3:50
11.	"Thank You Everyday"	Brill; Kier; Tei	6:22
12.	"Rubber Lover"	Brill; Kier; Tei	3:59
13.	"Come on in, the Dreams Are Fine" (featuring Arrested Development)	Brill; Kier; Tei; Arrested Development	5:10
14.	"Love Is Everything" (bonus track)	Brill; Kier; Tei	5:27
Total length:			61:00

== Personnel ==
Credits adapted from AllMusic.

=== Deee-Lite ===
- Lady Kier Kirby – vocals
- Super DJ Dmitry Brill – guitar, keyboards, bass, drum programming, loop scooping, piano
- Towa Tei – keyboards, bass, drum programming, loop scooping

=== Additional personnel ===
- Bernie Worrell – clavinet (on track 3), clavinet and piano (8), synthesizer (9), melodica (14)
- Satoshi Tomiie – keyboards (11, 13)
- Bootsy Collins – guitar (3, 4, 6, 8, 9, 11, 12, 14), bass (3, 10, 12, 14), backing vocals (12, 14)
- Catfish Collins – guitar (14)
- Robin Lobe – percussion (3, 13)
- Misha Masud – tabla (14)
- Maceo Parker – saxophone (3, 4, 6, 8, 9), flute (13)
- Fred Wesley – trombone (3, 4, 6, 8, 9)
- Gary Mudbone Cooper, Danny Madden, Sahirah Moore, Sheila Slappy, Zhana Saunders – backing vocals
- Arrested Development – rap (1), African chant (13)
- Jamal-Ski (6)
- Michael Franti - rap (9)

=== Production ===
- Deee-Lite – arranger, mixing, producer
- Fernando Aponte – assistant engineer
- Shannon Carr – assistant engineer
- Dennis Mitchell – digital editing
- Dante de Sole – assistant engineer
- Rob Kempner – assistant engineer
- Lady Miss Kier – design
- Michael F. Mills – art direction, package design
- John Parthum – assistant engineer
- Nick Phillips – artwork
- Mark Plati – engineer
- Herb Powers – mastering
- Mike Rogers – mixing
- Dana Vlcek – assistant engineer

== Charts ==
Chart (1992)	Peak position
Australian Albums (ARIA)	117
UK Albums Chart	37
US Billboard 200	67
