= John Fluevog =

Canadian fashion designer

- Born: May 15, 1948; Vancouver, British Columbia, Canada
- Occupations: Shoe designer, businessperson
- Known for: John Fluevog Shoes

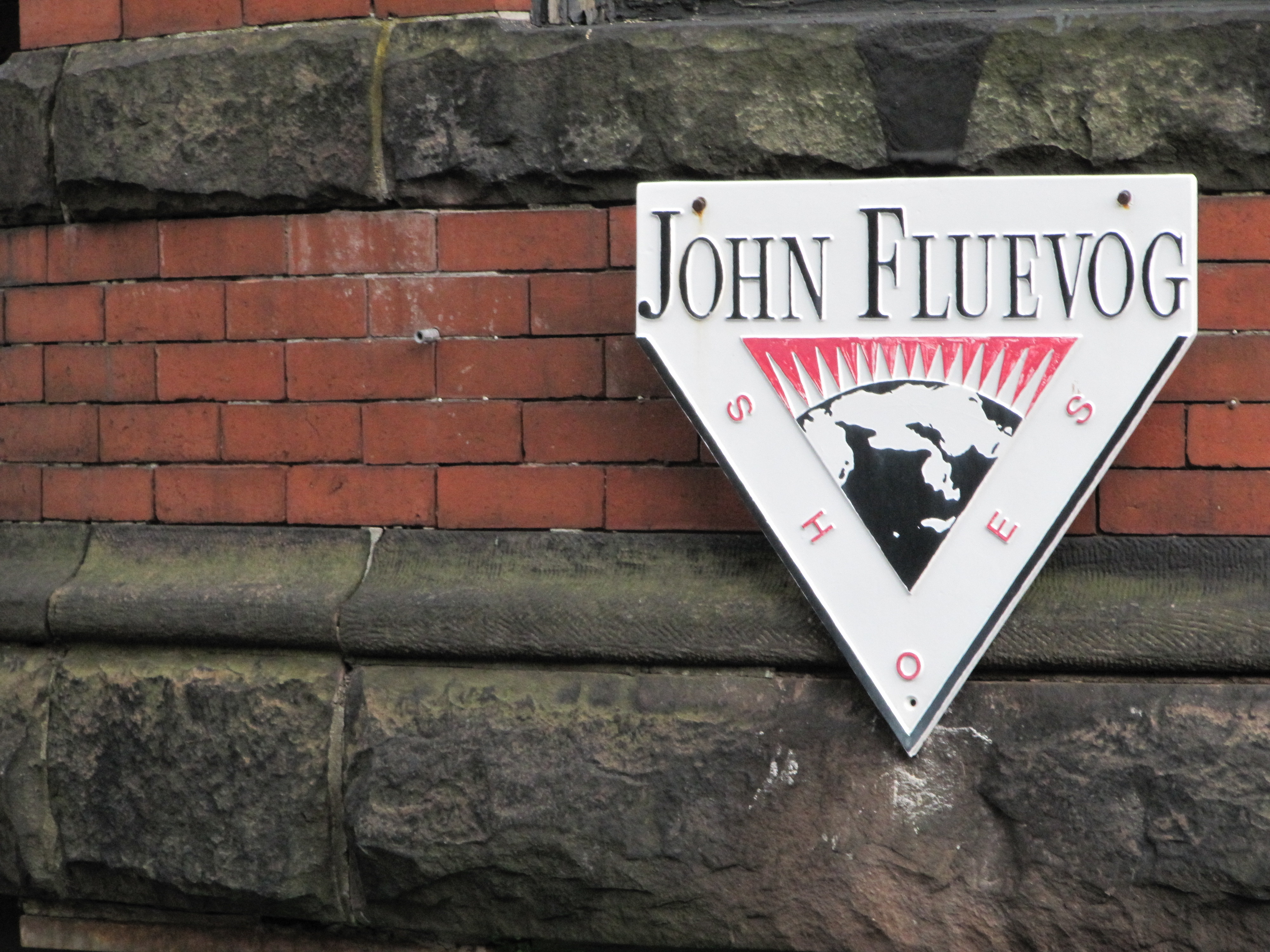
Store sign on Newbury Street in Boston

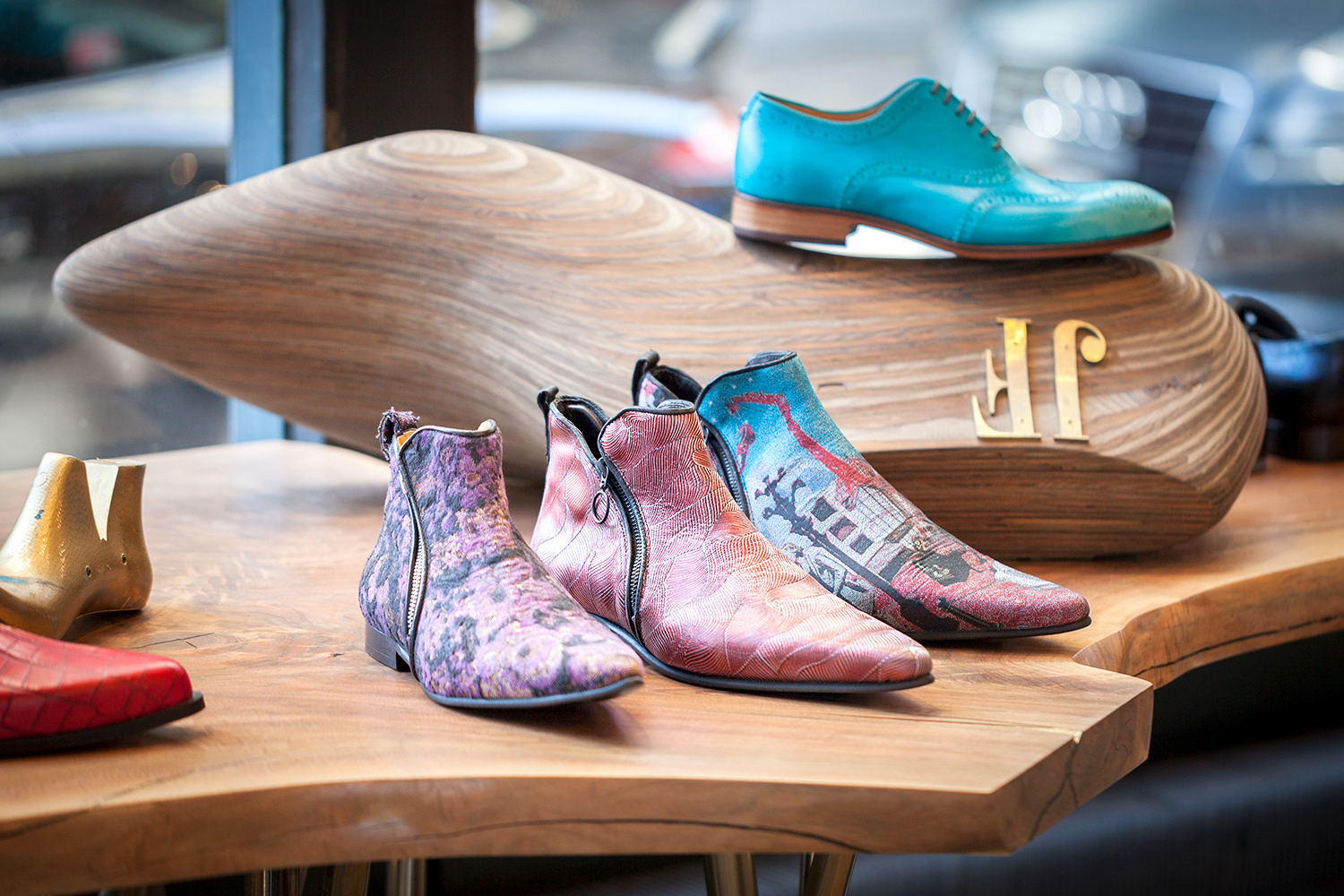
John Fluevog store in Dumbo, Brooklyn

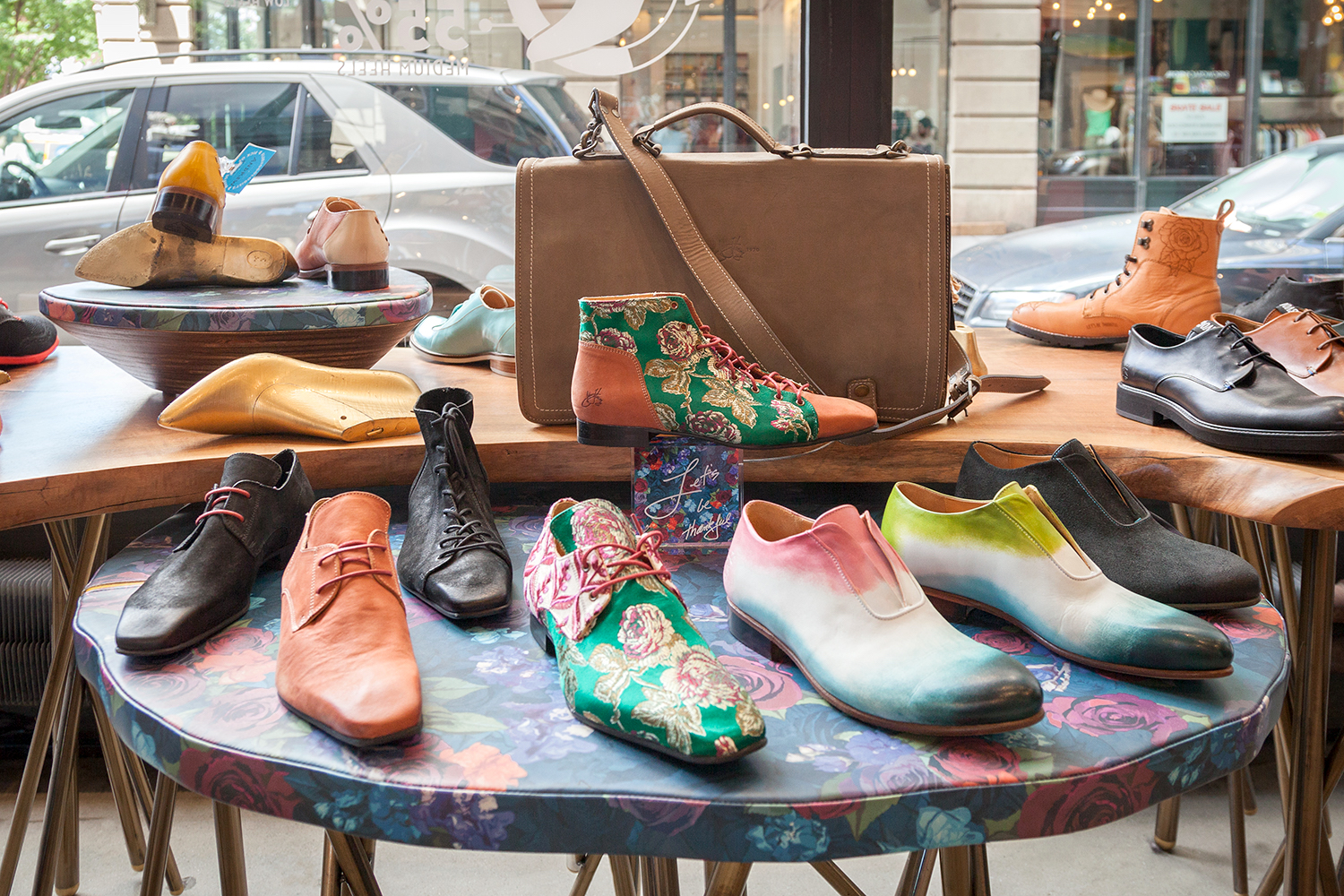
Store display

John Fluevog (born May 15, 1948) is a Canadian shoe designer and businessperson. In 1970, he and co-worker Peter Fox began their own shoe store in Vancouver. The shoes are described as "progressive, Art Deco inspired". The shoes are designed in Vancouver, and manufactured in Portugal, Brazil, Peru, China and Vietnam, according to the company's website. The shoes often include messages engraved into the soles, the most famous being from The 7th Heaven Family, whose Angel Soles read: Resists alkali, water, acid, fatigue and Satan.

== History ==
Born and raised in Vancouver, British Columbia, Canada, Fluevog spent much of his youth at his father's drive-in ice cream parlour. During this time, he developed a passion for cars, which in turn has provided inspiration for many of his shoe designs.

He began his career working for Sheppard's Shoes in Vancouver. In 1970, he joined forces with Peter Fox to start their own shoe store in Vancouver's Gastown. The partnership, known as "Fox and Fluevog", lasted over ten years before the two split in 1981. In 1985, Fluevog opened his own store in Seattle.

During the 1980s, Fluevog store was the first to import Dr. Martens shoes into North America. By the 1990s, Fluevog had opened five privately owned and operated stores in Seattle, Vancouver, Boston, Toronto, and New York. His shoes began to appear in magazines such as Vogue, in fashion shows for Anna Sui and Betsey Johnson, and worn by celebrities such as Madonna and Lady Miss Kier.

By the end of the 1990s, Fluevog had stores in San Francisco and Chicago also. These were followed in the 2000s by stores in Los Angeles, Montreal, and a new flagship store in Gastown. As of April 2015 there were 19 Fluevog stores in North America.

== "Green philosophy" ==
As part of Fluevog's "green philosophy", when Fluevog opened his new Gastown store, he moved his design office into the store location so that customers could watch the design team in action from the first floor showroom. By creating desks out of scaffolding, tables out of fallen old growth oak trees and pipes salvaged from the Alaskan Pipeline, and using recycled carpets and other various cast-off items, John designed an eco-friendly workspace.

Fluevog "Angel" soles are resoleable and made from hevea tree latex, a natural latex harvested in Vietnam. Some styles have been made using vegetable tanned leathers. Fluevog has also released remakes of successful styles using hemp instead of leather, making the shoes vegan.

Vietnamese, Cambodian and Burmese records of human rights have been the subject of criticism by the United Nations, Amnesty International and others; latex and rubber growers in these countries subject workers to extremely low wages, in violation of minimum wage laws, and even illegally occupy thousands of hectares of forest while removing indigenous people.

== Design collaborations ==
In 2002, Fluevog created an online site where anyone can submit shoe designs. If a submission is selected, the shoe is named after its creator. As of April 2015, there were fifteen open source submissions manufactured. Other Fluevog collaboration designs have included a snowboarding boot with Ride Snowboards, a bicycling shoe with Race Face Bikes, a shoe with the Danielson Family, and a Riding boot designed with Courtney Taylor-Taylor of The Dandy Warhols.

In 2007 after a spontaneous performance in the Vancouver storefront, Perry Farrell of Jane's Addiction, gravitated toward the store's women's heels. Inspired by the performance, Fluevog designed a 2.5" men's high heeled boot named "Perry", which was manufactured in blue faux-crocodile, black snake, and mirror silver leathers for Fluevog's Fall '08 line.

== Clients ==
Fluevog has gained fans all over the world who have become known as "Fluevogers". Some notable fans include Whoopi Goldberg, who wore a pair of Fluevog's Mini "lover boots" on her first day as co-host on The View, Lady Gaga, Woody Harrelson, Scarlett Johansson, Robin Williams, Neil Patrick Harris, Paula Abdul, and actor Masi Oka who was seen wearing Fluevogs on many episodes of NBC's Heroes.

The White Stripes own custom red and white Fluevogs.

Amanda Palmer has said that she admires his designs, and wears his shoes to advertise his merchandise.
