= Power of Love (Deee-Lite song) =

Single by Deee-Lite

from the album World Clique
- Released: 1990
- Genre: Pop; house; dance
- Length: 4:40
- Label: Elektra
- Songwriters: Dmitry Brill; Dong-hwa Chung; Kierin Kirby
- Producer: Deee-Lite

Deee-Lite singles chronology
| "Groove Is in the Heart" (1990) | "Power of Love" (1990) | "Runaway" (1992) |

Music video
- "Power of Love" on YouTube

"Power of Love" is a song recorded, written and produced by New York City–based house and dance music group Deee-Lite. It was released in 1990 by Elektra Records as the second single from their debut album, World Clique (1990). Overseas, it peaked at number 19 in New Zealand, number 21 in Ireland and number 25 in the United Kingdom. In the United States, the single went to number 54 on the Hot R&B/Hip-Hop Songs chart and number 47 on the Billboard Hot 100. On the Dance Club Songs chart, "Power of Love" was the group's second number-one hit, where it remained at the top for two weeks. The vocals (Kier's "Ye Yay" chorus) from the single would be used in another single that also reached number-one on the Dance Club Songs chart in 1991, "Deep in My Heart" by Club House.

== Critical reception ==
In a retrospective review, Matthew Hocter from Albumism described the song as "piano heavy". Upon the release, Larry Flick from Billboard magazine wrote that the trio followed their debut single "Groove Is in the Heart" "with an equally engaging confection that weaves optimistic lyrics into a percolating pop/house fabric. Should keep the momentum rolling along." Hannsjörg Riemann from German Bravo gave the song three out of three, remarking its "bombast sound" and the "blazing jungle rhythm drone. [...] Mainly suitable for dance fanatics." Melody Maker said, "Not nearly as immediately intoxicating as its predecessor [...], nevertheless it's still propelled by Lady Miss Kier's gigantic and seemingly unassailable optimism. And it still has a melody as insidious as any radio jingle. Deee-Lite are so emphatically of their time one wonders what on Earth this will sound like a year from now."

A reviewer from Music & Media constated that the second single of the "'De La Soul of house music' is a little gem of joy and optimism made of beats and melodies." Selina Webb from Music Week viewed it as "a disappointingly straight follow-up". She wrote further, "A solid dance track, but there are more distinctive and refreshing offerings on the album. Unlikely to make up for so narrowly missing the top spot last time out." Gene Sandbloom from The Network Forty felt the song "is night and day from" the group's first single. A reviewer from NME commented, "As dance sides go, this is pulsating and positive stuff...psychedelic even. 'Power of Love' is boosted with a beaty and meaty mix that bounces the furnitures around the room and comes complete with a "message og hope" for you to meditate on." Steven Daly from Spin described it as a "lusty house romp", "which set the tempo for the majority of World Clique's duration."

== Charts ==
=== Weekly charts ===
| Chart (1990) | Peak position |
|---|---|
| Finland (Suomen virallinen lista) | 7 |
| Ireland (IRMA) | 21 |
| New Zealand (RIANZ) | 19 |
| UK Singles (OCC) | 25 |
| UK Airplay (Music Week) | 16 |
| US Billboard Hot 100 | 47 |
| US Dance Club Songs (Billboard) | 1 |
| US Hot R&B/Hip-Hop Songs (Billboard) | 54 |
| US Cash Box Top 100 | 47 |

=== Year-end charts ===
| Chart (1990) | Position |
|---|---|
| UK Club Chart (Record Mirror) | 61 |

== See also ==
- List of number-one dance singles of 1991 (U.S.)
