= Bring Me Your Love (song) =

Promotional single by Deee-Lite

from the album Dewdrops in the Garden
- Released: May 1994
- Genre: Dance; house
- Length: 3:38 (album version)
- Label: Elektra
- Songwriter(s): Deee-Lite
- Producer(s): Deee-Lite

Deee-Lite singles chronology
"Call Me" (1994)	"Bring Me Your Love" (1994)	"Party Happening People" (1994)

"Bring Me Your Love" is a song written, recorded and produced by American-based group Deee-Lite, which was released in May 1994 by Elektra Records as the second single of their third and final studio album, Dewdrops in the Garden (1994). The single was issued as a 12-inch white vinyl and sampled "The Children's Song" by Eddie Harris.

This would be the act's fifth single to top the number one position on the US Billboard dance chart. during the week ending August 13, 1994. The B side included a remix of "Party Happening People," which peaked at number 30 in 1994.

== Critical reception ==
Larry Flick from Billboard magazine wrote, "Brace yourself for a spankin' new Deee-Lite vibe, as the quirky and cool trio reinvents itself with a flower-power rave attitude. The changes, however, are primarily cosmetic, since a familiar lyrical message of love and unity remains in place–as does a reverence for retro-funk and soul. Lady Kier has grown into quite the seductress, injecting a naughty sass into the song." Richard Smith from Melody Maker felt the "disco laser explosion" in "Bring Me Your Love" "is just plain orgasmic." A reviewer from Music & Media commented, "The one-time masters of weirdelica produce a lite version of their speciality. Do not be put off by the less unconventional first impression." Brad Beatnik from Music Week's RM Dance Update complimented it as "a fine comeback and an original and interesting package for DJs." Ted Kessler from NME noted its "fine, squelchy, lysergic funk".

== Formats and track listings ==
- US 12" maxi single

A1. "Bring Me Your Love" (Sampladelic Prod. Isness Not Business Mix)
A2. "Bring Me Your Love" (DJ Digit Remix)
A3. "Bring Me Your Love" (DJ EFX Remix)
B1. "Party Happenin' People" (Sampladelic Prod. Mushroom Mix)
B2. "Bring Me Your Love" (Johnny Vicious Cosmic Isness Remix 1)
B3. "Bring Me Your Love" (Johnny Vicious Cosmic Isness Remix 2)

== Charts ==
Chart (1994)	Peak position
UK Club Chart (Music Week)	4
US Hot Dance Club Play (Billboard)	1

== See also ==
- List of number-one dance singles of 1994 (U.S.)
