= Dewdrops in the Garden =

Studio album by Deee-Lite
- Released: July 12, 1994
- Genres: House; techno; funk; hip hop
- Length: 67:58
- Label: Elektra
- Producer: Deee-Lite

Deee-Lite chronology
Infinity Within (1992)	Dewdrops in the Garden (1994)	Dewdrops in the Remix (1995)

Singles from Dewdrops in the Garden
- 1. "Call Me" Released: February 25, 1994; 2. "Bring Me Your Love" Released: May 1994; 3. "Party Happening People" Released: July 12, 1994; 4. "Picnic in the Summertime" Released: August 2, 1994

Professional ratings
Initial reviews (in 1994)
Review scores
Source	Rating
The Baltimore Sun	(favourable)
Billboard	(favourable)
Cash Box	(favourable)
Christgau's Consumer Guide	(neither)
Entertainment Weekly	B−
The Guardian	(favourable)
Knoxville News Sentinel	2.5/5 stars
Music & Media	(favourable)
People Magazine	(favourable)
Q	2/5 stars
Select	2/5 medals

Professional ratings
Retrospective reviews (after 1994)
Review scores
Source	Rating
AllMusic	4/5 stars
Pitchfork	8.5/10
Slant Magazine	4/5 stars

Dewdrops in the Garden is the third and final studio album by American dance music band Deee-Lite, released in August 1994 via Elektra Records. The album saw the group move away from the overtly political lyrical content of the previous album, shifting into themes of dance and intimacy with a heavier lean into psychedelic music.

== Background ==
At the time of the release of Dewdrops in the Garden, Lady Kier had compared it to Infinity Within, saying:

During the Gulf War and Bush years we felt it was important to use the platform we had in the media responsibly. Our new album is more about personal politics rather than global. We're going back to our original concept. People have enough problems, they don't need to hear it in music. Just making uplifting music is a political statement in itself. We want to strengthen their spirit on the dance floor so they can diffuse the dissatisfaction from daily global destruction.

The album drew inspiration from Lady Kier's travels to the Hopi ruins in the Painted Desert and pyramids in Yucatán and Dmitry's travels to the Grand Canyon and Joshua Tree. The inspiration was clear in Lady Kier's description of the track "Music Selector is the Soul Reflector":

It is about the love of the collective dancefloor consciousness. The DJ is like the guru, the booth is the altar, the dancefloor is the sacred ground we worship on.

Most of the work on Dewdrops in the Garden was done by Super DJ Dmitry and Lady Miss Kier joined by Kansan producer Ani Schempf (DJ Ani, also known as DJ On-E and DJ Ani Quinn). Towa Tei had left the band to do some work on Japanese pop star Nokko's album and his own debut solo album Future Listening!, and he was said to be back for the band's fourth album, which was never made. Even through his absence, Tei contributed various production to the tracks "Call Me", "Party Happening People", "DMT (Dance Music Trance)", and the "Funky Chunky Bonus Beats" portion of "What is This Music?".

Shortly after the album's release, a companion album titled Dewdrops in the Remix containing four remixes of "Picnic in the Summertime," four mixes of "Bring Me Your Love," and six mixes of "Call Me" was released in Japan. "Bring Me Your Love" and "Call Me" became their last two number-one hits on the Hot Dance Music/Club Play chart.

== Critical reception ==
Billboard magazine named the album "a solid collection that forgoes the political rhetoric of [Infinity Within] in favor of lighter, sing-along fare. Lady Kier continues to mature as a singer, molding her giddy, girlish delivery into seductive, world-wise purr. She oozes confidence over a slew of rhythms that swerves from familiar house and hip-hop territory into more trendy trance, rave, and break-beat areas. Radio and club programmers seeking a sequel to 'Groove Is in the Heart' will be disappointed, though open minds should find jams like funk-rooted 'Picnic in the Summertime', 'Apple Juice Kissing', and 'Say Ahhh ...' equally pleasing."

== Track listing ==
All tracks written by Deee-Lite.

No.	Title	Length
1.	"Say Ahhh…"	4:10
2.	"Mind Melt"	0:33
3.	"Bittersweet Loving"	3:42
4.	"River of Freedom"	4:06
5.	"Somebody"	3:30
6.	"When You Told Me You Loved Me"	3:00
7.	"Stay in Bed, Forget the Rest"	3:10
8.	"Call Me"	3:50
9.	"Music Selector is the Soul Reflector"	4:30
10.	"Sampladelic"	0:47
11.	"Bring Me Your Love"	3:40
12.	"Picnic in the Summertime"	3:32
13.	"Apple Juice Kissing"	3:13
14.	"Party Happening People"	4:00
15.	"DMT (Dance Music Trance)"	4:27
16.	"What is This Music?": 1. "What is This Music?"; 2. "Untitled Spoken Word Sample"; 3. "Party Happening People (Funky Chunky Bonus Beats)"; 4. "Bring Me Your Love (Johnny Vicious Cosmic Isness Remix 1)"	17:50

- The song "What is This Music?" ends at minute 0:29. After exactly four minutes of silence begins an untitled spoken word sample as a brief hidden track, beginning at 4:29 and ending at 4:39. After approximately two minutes of silence begins another hidden track—an instrumental song known as "Party Happening People (Funky Chunky Bonus Beats)", previously only released on an obscure 12" vinyl test pressing of "Party Happening People"—beginning at 6:41 and ending at 10:03. After a further two minutes of silence, the final hidden track begins, "Bring Me Your Love (Johnny Vicious Cosmic Isness Remix 1)" from the 12" vinyl release of "Bring Me Your Love", beginning at 12:03 and ending at 17:50, closing off both the track and the album.

== Chart performance ==
Chart (1994)	Peak position
Australian Albums (ARIA)	140
US Billboard 200	127

== Personnel ==
=== Deee-Lite ===
- Kierin Kirby – vocals
- Dmitry Brill – keyboards, bass, drum programming, guitar, piano
- Towa Tei – drum programming (8, 14, 16), bass (8, 15), keyboards (8)
- Ani Schempf – keyboards, drum programming, scratching (1, 6, 11, 12, 16)

=== Additional Personnel ===
- Chillblast – beatbox (1, 5, 15)
- Joe Ruddick – keyboards (2, 7, 12)
- Kenny "Dope" Gonzales – keyboards (3)
- "Little" Louie Vega – keyboards (3)
- Angelica Galvez – additional vocals (1, 5)
- Zhana Saunders – backing vocals (3)
- Johnny Vicious – remix (16)

=== Production ===
- Deee-Lite – arranger, mixing, producer
- Armand Van Helden – digital editing
- Fernando Aponte – mixing, assistant engineer
- Robert Rives – mixing, assistant engineer
- Brian Miller – assistant engineer
- Jimmie Lee – assistant engineer
- Steve Barkan – assistant engineer
- Carlos Soul Slinger – assistant engineer
- Rob Vaughan Merrick – assistant engineer
- Heather "Aquasonic" Sommerfield – art direction
- Kier Kirby – art direction, design
- Alli Truch – artwork
- Rex Ray – design
- Joshua Jordan – photography
- James Minchin III – additional photography
- Tom Pitts – additional photography
- Nancy Jeffries – executive producer
- Rick Essig – mastering
- Reese Williams – additional production
