= Deee-Lite =

American dance music group

- Origin: New York City, U.S.
- Genres: Dance; house; techno; hip-hop; ambient; funk
- Years active: 1986–1996
- Label: Elektra
- Past members: Lady Miss Kier; Towa Tei; DJ Dmitry; DJ Ani

Deee-Lite was an American house and dance music group formed in New York City. The group's single "Groove Is in the Heart", which was released in 1990 from their debut studio album, World Clique (1990), was a top-ten hit in multiple countries. In December 2016, Billboard ranked them as the 55th-most successful dance artists of all time.

== History ==
=== 1986–1989: Background and early history ===
The band began in 1986 as a duo, in New York City, with Lady Miss Kier (legal name Kierin Magenta Kirby, primarily on vocals) and Supa DJ Dmitry (born in USSR as "Dmitry Brill") as DJ. The two then became a trio when Korean-Japanese DJ Towa Tei joined the group in 1988.

Beginning in 1986, Kier and Dmitry performed their songs monthly at various downtown New York nightclubs; in 1987, Kier bought an Akai S900 sampler, which influenced their sound tremendously. She also bought a Casio FZ-series sampler, which was used almost exclusively on their debut album. Sampling played an important role in their music leading them to name their production company "Sampladelic". From the band's inception, Kier designed their promotional posters and club fliers, and was also the graphic designer for all three of their albums and 12" singles. The group played at hip-hop and house clubs, at both gay clubs and straight establishments, and at the New York drag festival Wigstock. They also opened for Native Tongue Movement's De La Soul and Jungle Brothers. As described by Rolling Stone, "they were drawing vivid, multiracial, pan-sexual crowds...". Part of the band's appeal was their inclusivity, as noted by Mademoiselle magazine: "as a group, they're a festival of individuality; as a band, they're a party anyone can attend." These live shows garnered a steady following, and attracted future third member Towa Tei as a fan.

In 1988, Towa sent Kier and Dmitry a bedroom demo tape he had made, and they realised he, like them, also enjoyed a fusion of funk and techno. Towa and Dmitry began jointly-programming the band's computer. Although Towa did not play any instruments, he was a record collector and added various sounds and samples. Kier and Dmitry invited him to join the group that year, and together the three produced their first album. Kier wrote all the lyrics and melodies, and also asked bass guitarist Bootsy Collins to join-in on recording sessions. Dmitry played guitar, keyboard, and bass, while Towa gathered samples for fill-ins and grooves. Collins introduced the trio to The Horny Horns, Fred Wesley, Maceo Parker, Mudbone Cooper, and Bernie Worrell, and also helped assemble their touring ensemble. Together, Deee-Lite would produce their first and second albums under their own production company, Sampladelic.

=== 1990–1997: Album releases and fame ===
In 1990, the group released their first album, World Clique, preceded by the debut single "Groove Is in the Heart", which became a hit in many countries, including No. 1 in Australia and topping the Billboard US Dance Club Songs chart. The song features vocals from Q-Tip (of A Tribe Called Quest) as well as a bass guitar loop sampled from Herbie Hancock's "Bring Down The Birds" (1967), with additional vocals by collaborator and funk musician Bootsy Collins. In 1992, they released their politically-charged second album, Infinity Within. The album failed to chart as high as their debut, but they still managed two Top 10 dance hits in the US with "Runaway" and "Pussycat Meow".

Towa ultimately did not join the group on their world tours, for which they had assembled a nine-piece band, as he had desired to start working on the second Deee-Lite album (Infinity Within) from the comfort of his own home, where his records and samples were kept. As expressed to MTV News: "...a reason I left Deee-Lite was that I hated the touring—playing the same songs over and over again every night," Towa said. "I'm not that type of person. I don't like being in front of the people." After extensively touring, Kier and Dmitry were not given funding for Infinity Within, as originally promised by their Warner contract. Upon the release of the album, Kier and Dmitry wondered if Deee-Lite's overall sound was "losing touch" with the dancefloor crowds, and thus they began creating the dancefloor album Dewdrops in the Garden (1994). At the time, creative differences were intensifying with Towa and Kier and Dmitry. Speaking again to MTV News, Towa explained: "When I made a big decision to take a break, I started to listen to different types of music again—bossa nova, soundtracks. I started getting materials that went beyond the Deee-Lite concept. For me it fit, but for them it didn't really fit." Prior to the release of Dewdrops in the Garden, Towa abruptly left the band (appearing only on the track "Call Me"), and was replaced by DJ Ani. Kier was determined to keep the band together, and offered Towa the chance to remix a song of his choice so he'd have a presence on the third Deee-Lite album. Even with a lineup change and minimal record label support, Deee-Lite managed to tour for another year after the release of the album, selling even more records than their sophomore release. In 1994, Kier and Dmitry's increasingly turbulent relationship came to an end, as did the group.

In total, the group scored six No. 1 hits on the U.S. Billboard Hot Dance Club Play chart over the five years they were together.

=== Post breakup ===
In the years since the band's dissolution, financial problems due to bad management impacted both Kier and Dmitry; however, both still work as writers, producers and DJs. Kier is often regarded as a style "icon" by publications, such as Vogue. Dmitry was named the "DJ of the year" in Ibiza, and has remixed for artists including Arthur Russell, Jungle Brothers, Sinéad O'Connor, Ziggy Marley, Nina Hagen, Ultra Naté, and others.

Towa Tei has recorded several albums as a solo artist, and was featured in the Japanese supergroup METAFIVE. In a 2011 interview, Tei denied the possibility of Deee-Lite reuniting, even fleetingly, citing the creative and personal differences that prompted him to depart in the first place.

== Members ==
- Supa DJ Dmitry aka DJ Dmitry (Dmitry Brill, born June 4, 1964, Kyiv, Ukrainian SSR, USSR), composer, producer, keyboards, guitar
- Lady Miss Kier (Kierin M. Kirby, born August 15, 1963, Youngstown, Ohio, United States), vocalist, producer, arranger, lyricist, choreographer, art director, manager
- Towa Tei (born September 7, 1964, originally from Yokohama, Japan), composer, producer, keyboards, turntables, programming
- DJ Ani (Ani Q. Schempf, born December 14, 1973, Kansas City, Kansas, United States), mixing, bass

== Discography ==
=== Studio albums ===
List of studio albums, with selected chart positions, sales figures and certifications
Title	Album details	Peak chart positions					Certifications
Title	Album details	US	AUS	CAN	NZ	UK	Certifications
World Clique	Released: August 7, 1990; Label: Elektra; Format: CD, LP, cassette	20	33	15	30	14	RIAA: Gold; BPI: Gold; MC: Platinum
Infinity Within	Released: June 23, 1992; Label: Elektra; Format: CD, LP, cassette	67	117	—	—	37	
Dewdrops in the Garden	Released: July 12, 1994; Label: Elektra; Format: CD, LP, cassette	127	140	—	—	78	

=== Compilation albums ===
List of compilation albums
Title	Album details
Dewdrops in the Remix	Released: 1995 (Japan); Label: Elektra; Format: CD
Sampladelic Relics & Dancefloor Oddities	Released: 1996; Label: Elektra; Format: 2×CD
The Very Best of Deee-Lite	Released: 2001; Label: Rhino, Elektra; Format: CD
The Elektra Years	Released: 2020; Label: Warner Music; Format: Digital
Groove Is in the Heart	Released: April 2020; Label: Warner Music; Format: Digital

=== Singles ===
Year	Single	Peak chart positions										Certifications	Album
Year	Single	US	US Dance	AUS	CAN	GER	IRE	NED	NZ	SWI	UK	Certifications	Album
1990	"Groove Is in the Heart" / "What Is Love?"	4	1	1	15	17	8	10	2	13	2	ARIA: Platinum; BPI: Platinum	World Clique
1990	"Power of Love"	47	1	47	82	43	21	47	19	—	25		World Clique
1991	"E.S.P."	—	7	—	—	—	—	—	—	—	—		World Clique
1991	"How Do You Say...Love"	—	—	—	—	—	24	—	—	—	52		World Clique
1991	"Good Beat"	—	1	105	—	—	—	—	45	—	53		World Clique
1992	"Runaway"	—	1	112	70	—	—	—	—	25	45		Infinity Within
1992	"Thank You Everyday"	—	—	—	—	—	—	—	—	—	92		Infinity Within
1992	"Pussycat Meow"	—	6	—	—	—	—	—	—	—	—		Infinity Within
1994	"Party Happening People"	—	30	—	—	—	—	—	—	—	—		Dewdrops in the Garden
1994	"Picnic in the Summertime"	—	—	—	—	—	—	—	—	—	43		Dewdrops in the Garden
1994	"Bring Me Your Love"	—	1	—	—	—	—	—	—	—	—		Dewdrops in the Garden
1994	"Call Me"	—	1	—	—	—	—	—	—	—	—		Dewdrops in the Garden
"—" denotes releases that did not chart

== See also ==
- List of Billboard number-one dance club songs
- List of artists who reached number one on the U.S. Dance Club Songs chart
