= Groove Is in the Heart =

1990 single by Deee-Lite

Single by Deee-Lite

from the album World Clique
- B-side: "What Is Love?"
- Released: July 30, 1990
- Recorded: 1990
- Genre: Disco; funk; house; hip-hop; dance-pop
- Length: 3:54
- Label: Elektra
- Songwriters: Dmitry Brill; Towa Tei; Kierin Kirby; Herbie Hancock; Jonathan Davis
- Producer: Deee-Lite

Deee-Lite singles chronology
"Groove Is in the Heart" (1990)	"Power of Love" (1990)

Music video
- "Groove Is in the Heart" on YouTube

"Groove Is in the Heart" is a song by American dance band Deee-Lite, released in July 1990 by Elektra Records as their debut single, as well as the lead single from their first album, World Clique (1990). Written and produced by the band, it was a hit in many countries, reaching number one in Australia and on both the Canadian RPM and US Billboard dance charts. Today it is widely recognized as a classic of its genre. It was accompanied with a psychedelic 60s-themed music video directed by Hiroyuki Nakano.

== Composition ==
Though the album version was not recorded until 1990, the song was originally written in the late 1980s; it was performed live as early as 1989. The backing track was built around many samples, primarily the main riff from Herbie Hancock's track "Bring Down the Birds" from the Blowup soundtrack and Vernon Burch's "Get Up", which provided the drum track and also formed the basis for the breakdown featuring a slide whistle. Parliament-Funkadelic bassist Bootsy Collins provided guest vocals, and the rap is provided by Q-Tip of A Tribe Called Quest. The repeated motif "I, I-I-I-I-I" is performed with the first word of a sample of Eva Gabor saying "I get allergic smelling hay" from the theme song of Green Acres.

== Critical reception ==
Upon the release, J.D. Considine from The Baltimore Sun found that "Groove Is in the Heart" "bounces happily from rap to funk to house without losing either momentum or its sense of humor." Bill Coleman from Billboard magazine wrote, "Sometimes you can believe the hype. Hot New York City underground dance trio more than lives up to prerelease push with this sizzling groove'n'sample funk jam, kicked into gear by the sultry and charismatic vocal presence of future diva Lady Miss Kier." He also added, "'Groove' is, well, very groovy. A house-paced track with a hip-hop sensibility." Bevan Hannan from The Canberra Times described the song as "good fun". David Giles from Music Week named it a "fine single". He added, "Pure Seventies funk with a Nineties groove." Helen Mead from NME stated that it is "playfully funky". A reviewer from People Magazine noted it as "hopping". Ross Grady from The Rice Thresher said it is "one of the creamiest slabs of vinyl ever to come from the house music scene." Caroline Sullivan from Smash Hits wrote that the "ripping floor filler" has "got the samples and twiddly electronoises so necessary for dancefloor success nowadays, but there's also a hummable melody and sense of humour about it all." NME and The Village Voice's Pazz & Jop annual critics' poll named "Groove Is in the Heart" the best single released in the year 1990.

== Chart performance ==
An immediate smash in nightclubs, the song went to number one on the US Dance Club Play chart and also reached number four on the Billboard Hot 100. It peaked at number one in Australia for a week in November 1990 and was also a number-one hit in Luxembourg, while it reached number two in New Zealand.

In the UK, the record was equally popular and was released as a double A-side with "What Is Love" with the subtitle "Peanut Butter mix", in which the song was heavily edited and completely omitted the contributions by Bootsy Collins and Q-Tip. The single eventually reached number two during September 1990. Its placing second was due to a rule instituted in the UK Singles Chart in the 1980s, which settled any "ties" over chart positions due to equal sales: the single with sales that had increased most from the previous week would reside above the other, controversially giving "The Joker" by the Steve Miller Band the top place. Following complaints from Deee-Lite's record company, WEA, the rule, of which this song had been the only victim, was scrapped and joint positions were once again allowed. However, it turned out that the 2,595 panel sales that both records achieved for this week of September 15, 1990, had been rounded up, with chart compilers Gallup later releasing the data that showed that the Steve Miller Band hit was indeed a fraction ahead, Deee-Lite having been narrowly defeated by 44,118 to 44,110 copies. "The Joker" spent a second week at the number-one spot and thereafter convincingly outsold "Groove Is in the Heart".

In mainland Europe, the single entered the top 10 in Finland, Greece, Ireland, Italy, the Netherlands, and Spain, as well as on the Eurochart Hot 100 Singles, on which it peaked at number five in September 1990. Additionally, it was a top-20 hit in Belgium, Germany, and Switzerland while entering the top 30 in Austria. "Groove Is in the Heart" earned a gold record in the US, after 500,000 singles were sold. In Australia and the UK, it earned a platinum record, when 70,000 and 600,000 units, respectively, were sold.

== Music video ==
The accompanying music video for "Groove Is in the Heart" was directed by Japanese film director Hiroyuki Nakano and shows lead singer Lady Miss Kier dancing (as well as other band members) against a 1960s psychedelic themed background. It was nominated for a number of categories at the 1991 MTV Video Music Awards without winning any.

== Retrospective response ==
AllMusic editor Ned Raggett wrote in his review of World Clique, "Its reputation may rest on only one hit single – but what a hit. 'Groove Is in the Heart' defined the summer of 1990 on radio and MTV with its delicious combination of funk, modern dance sheen, and Lady Miss Kier's smart, sharp diva ways. Add in guest vocals and bass from Bootsy Collins (a pity his hilarious video cameo wasn't represented here), brass from the original Horny Horns duo of Fred Wesley and Maceo Parker, and a smooth mid-song rap from A Tribe Called Quest's Q-Tip, and the results sounded good then and now." In 2017, Stopera and Galindo from BuzzFeed declared it as a "perfect little slice of the early '90s New York club scene." NME called it a "pretty faultless collage of G-Funk, Daisy Age hip-hop, salsa and dippy disco." In 2006, Slant Magazine ranked the song third in its 100 Greatest Dance Songs list, writing: "No song delivered the group's world-conscious Word as colorfully and open-heartedly as 'Groove Is in the Heart,' which flew up the Billboard charts while goosing stuffed shirts."

== Impact and legacy ==
In 2003, Q Magazine ranked "Groove Is in the Heart" number 323 in their list of the "1001 Best Songs Ever". Same year, English music journalist Paul Morley included it in his list of "Greatest Pop Single of All Time". VH1 ranked it number 67 in their list of "100 Greatest Songs of the 90s" in 2007. Pitchfork named it the 59th best track of the 1990s. They wrote: "With their sass-tastic frontwoman and kitsched-to-death fashion sense, Deee-Lite probably seemed like a good bet at a time when pop's future was still up for grabs. If you were a kid in the 'burbs, they almost resembled a Daisy Age hip-hop group (the day-glo/flower-power look, the Q-Tip guest rap) as much as a house act (a strange urban subculture we had little access to in junior high)."

In 2011, The Guardian featured the song on their "A history of modern music: Dance". In April 2017 the single was re-released on pink vinyl, as part of Record Store Day with remixes of "What Is Love?" on the B-Side. BuzzFeed ranked the song number three in their "The 101 Greatest Dance Songs of the '90s" list in 2017. In 2018, Time Out ranked it number 23 in their list of "The 100 best party songs", adding, "In this tale of New York's anything-is-possible East Village of the late '80s, a trio of candy-coloured club kids – Super DJ Dmitri, Lady Miss Kier and Towa Tei – decide to form a band. The threesome (with a little help from ringers Q-Tip, Maceo Parker and Bootsy Collins) come up with 'Groove Is in the Heart', a sweetly innocent percolator of a tune that, against all odds, becomes the worldwide club smash of 1990. True story!"

In 2021, Rolling Stone ranked "Groove Is in the Heart" number 233 in its updated list of The 500 Greatest Songs of All Time, calling it "a collage across different generations of funkateers." In 2022, The Guardian ranked it number 18 in their list of "The 70 Greatest No 2 Singles – Ranked!". Alexis Petridis wrote, "If they'd had another song remotely as good as 'Groove Is in the Heart''s stew of samples, effortless pop melodies and interjections from Bootsy Collins and Q-Tip, Deee-Lite would have been huge. They didn't, but this joyous pop-disco classic will be played at parties for eternity." In 2023, Billboard ranked it number 68 in their "500 Best Pop Songs of All Time", while in March 2025, the magazine ranked it number two in their list of "The 100 Best Dance Songs of All Time".

=== Accolades ===
Accolades for "Groove Is in the Heart"
Year	Publisher	Country	Accolade	Rank
1990	Melody Maker	United Kingdom	"Singles Of The Year"	1
2003	Q	United Kingdom	"1001 Best Songs Ever"	323
2004	Q	United Kingdom	"The 1010 Songs You Must Own"	*
2005	Bruce Pollock	United States	"The 7,500 Most Important Songs of 1944–2000"	*
2007	VH1	United States	"100 Greatest Songs of the 90s"	67
2010	Robert Dimery	United States	"1,001 Songs You Must Hear Before You Die"	*
2010	Pitchfork	United States	"The Top 200 Tracks of the 1990s"	59
2011	MTV Dance	United Kingdom	"The 100 Biggest 90s Dance Anthems of All Time"	9
2011	The Guardian	United Kingdom	"A History of Modern Music: Dance"	*
2012	NME	United Kingdom	"100 Best Songs of the 1990s"	79
2012	Porcys	Poland	"100 Singli 1990–1999"	93
2013	Complex	United States	"15 Songs That Gave Dance Music a Good Name"	*
2014	Musikexpress	Germany	"Die 700 Besten Songs Aller Zeiten"	518
2017	BuzzFeed	United States	"The 101 Greatest Dance Songs of the '90s"	3
2017	ThoughtCo	United States	"The Best 100 Songs from the 1990s"	89
2018	Max	Australia	"1000 Greatest Songs of All Time"	152
2018	Time Out	United Kingdom	"The 100 Best Party Songs"	23
2019	Billboard	United States	"Billboard's Top Songs of the '90s"	220
2019	Max	Australia	"1000 Greatest Songs of All Time"	998
2020	Mixmag	United Kingdom	"The Best Basslines in Dance Music"	*
2020	Slant Magazine	United States	"The 100 Best Dance Songs of All Time"	3
2021	Rolling Stone	United States	Rolling Stone's 500 Greatest Songs of All Time	233
2022	Classic Pop	United Kingdom	"90s Dance – The Essential Playlist"	1
2022	Pitchfork	United States	"The 250 Best Songs of the 1990s"	47
2022	Rolling Stone	United States	"200 Greatest Dance Songs of All Time"	37
2022	The Guardian	United Kingdom	"The 70 Greatest No 2 Singles – Ranked!"	18
2022	Time Out	United Kingdom	"The 100 Best Party Songs Ever Made"	12
2023	Billboard	United States	"Best Pop Songs of All Time"	68
2025	Billboard	United States	"The 100 Best Dance Songs of All Time"	2

(*) indicates the list is unordered.

== Track listings ==
- CD maxi – Europe
1. "Groove Is in the Heart" (meeting of the minds mix) – 5:14
2. "Groove Is in the Heart" (peanut butter mix) – 3:31
3. "What Is Love?" (holographic goatee mix) – 4:10
4. "What Is Love?" (rainbow beard mix) – 4:04
- CD maxi – US
1. "Groove Is in the Heart" (LP version) – 3:55
2. "Groove Is in the Heart" (peanut butter radio mix) – 3:32
3. "Groove Is in the Heart" (meeting of the minds mix) – 5:14
4. "Groove Is in the Heart" (Jelly Jam beats) – 2:12
5. "What Is Love?" (holographic goatee mix) – 4:13
6. "What Is Love?" (frenchapella) – 0:57
7. "What Is Love?" (rainbow beard mix) – 4:03
- 2017 Record Store Day Re-Release

A1. "Groove Is in the Heart" (Meeting of the Minds mix)
A2. "Groove Is in the Heart" (Peanut Butter mix)
A3. "Groove Is in the Heart" (Jelly Jam Beats)
B1. "What Is Love?" (Holographic Goatee mix)
B2. "What Is Love?" (Frenchapella)
B3. "What Is Love?" (Rainbow Beard mix)

- 7-inch single
1. "Groove Is in the Heart" (peanut butter mix) – 3:29
2. "What Is Love?" (holographic goatee mix) – 4:10
- 12-inch maxi
1. "Groove Is in the Heart" (meeting of the minds mix) – 5:10
2. "Groove Is in the Heart" (peanut butter mix) – 3:29
3. "What Is Love?" (holographic goatee mix) – 4:10
4. "What Is Love?" (rainbow beard mix) – 4:02
- Digital single
1. "Groove Is in the Heart" – 3:54
2. "Groove Is in the Heart" (Bootsified to the Nth Degree) – 5:04
3. "Groove Is in the Heart" (Meeting the Minds Mix) – 5:10
4. "Groove Is in the Heart" (Peanut Butter Mix) – 3:29
5. "Groove Is in the Heart" (Jelly Jam Beats) – 2:12
6. "Groove Is in the Heart" (Instrumental) – 3:45
7. "Groove Is in the Heart" (Acapella) – 3:38
8. "Groove Is in the Heart" (Extended Version) – 4:59

== Personnel ==
Personnel are adapted from the liner notes for World Clique.

- Lady Miss Kier – lead and background vocals
- Q-Tip – rap
- Bootsy Collins – background vocals
- Maceo Parker – saxophone
- Fred Wesley – trombone

== Charts ==
=== Weekly charts ===
1990–1991 weekly chart performance for "Groove Is in the Heart"
Chart (1990–1991)	Peak position
Australia (ARIA)	1
Austria (Ö3 Austria Top 40)	25
Belgium (Ultratop 50 Flanders)	19
Canada Top Singles (RPM)	15
Canada Dance/Urban (RPM)	1
Europe (Eurochart Hot 100)	5
Finland (Suomen virallinen lista)	9
France (SNEP)	31
Germany (GfK)	17
Greece (IFPI)	3
Ireland (IRMA)	8
Israel (Israeli Singles Chart)	3
Italy (Musica e dischi)	7
Luxembourg (Radio Luxembourg)	1
Netherlands (Dutch Top 40)	10
Netherlands (Single Top 100)	10
New Zealand (Recorded Music NZ)	2
Spain (AFYVE)	8
Switzerland (Schweizer Hitparade)	13
UK Singles (Official Charts)	2
UK Singles (MRIB)	1
UK Dance (Music Week)	2
UK Club Chart (Record Mirror)	1
US Billboard Hot 100	4
US 12-inch Singles Sales (Billboard) with "What Is Love?"'	1
US Dance Club Play (Billboard) with "What Is Love?"'	1
US Hot R&B Singles (Billboard)	28
US Cash Box Top 100	3

2012 weekly chart performance for "Groove Is in the Heart"
Chart (2012)	Peak position
France (SNEP)	151

=== Year-end charts ===
1990 year-end chart performance for "Groove Is in the Heart"
Chart (1990)	Rank
Australia (ARIA)	38
Canada Dance/Urban (RPM)	2
Europe (Eurochart Hot 100)	72
Israel (Israeli Singles Chart)	36
Italy (Musica e dischi)	94
Netherlands (Dutch Top 40)	86
Netherlands (Single Top 100)	90
New Zealand (RIANZ)	27
Sweden (Topplistan)	88
UK Singles (OCC)	26
UK Club Chart (Record Mirror)	2
US 12-inch Singles Sales (Billboard)	10
US Dance Club Play (Billboard)	1

1991 year-end chart performance for "Groove Is in the Heart"
Chart (1991)	Rank
Italy (Musica e dischi)	59
US Billboard Hot 100	91

== Certifications and sales ==
Certifications for "Groove Is in the Heart"
Region	Certification	Certified units/sales
Australia (ARIA)	Platinum	70,000^{^}
United Kingdom (BPI)	Platinum	600,000^{‡}
United States (RIAA)	Gold	500,000^{^}
^{^} Shipments figures based on certification alone.^{‡} Sales+streaming figures based on certification alone.

== Release history ==
Release dates and formats for "Groove Is in the Heart"
Region	Date	Format(s)	Label(s)	Ref.
United Kingdom	July 30, 1990	7-inch vinyl; 12-inch vinyl; CD; cassette	Elektra	
United States	August 1990	—N/a	Elektra	
Australia	September 17, 1990	12-inch vinyl; CD	Elektra	
Japan	September 25, 1990	Mini-CD	Elektra	
Australia	October 1, 1990	7-inch vinyl; cassette	Elektra	

== Cover versions ==
American retail chain Target Corporation used the song, as performed by Charli XCX with Questlove and Black Thought from the Roots, in a series of 2015 television advertisements.

== See also ==
- List of number-one singles in Australia during the 1990s
- List of RPM number-one dance singles of 1990
- List of Billboard number-one dance singles of 1990
