= Lady Miss Kier =

American musician (born 1963)

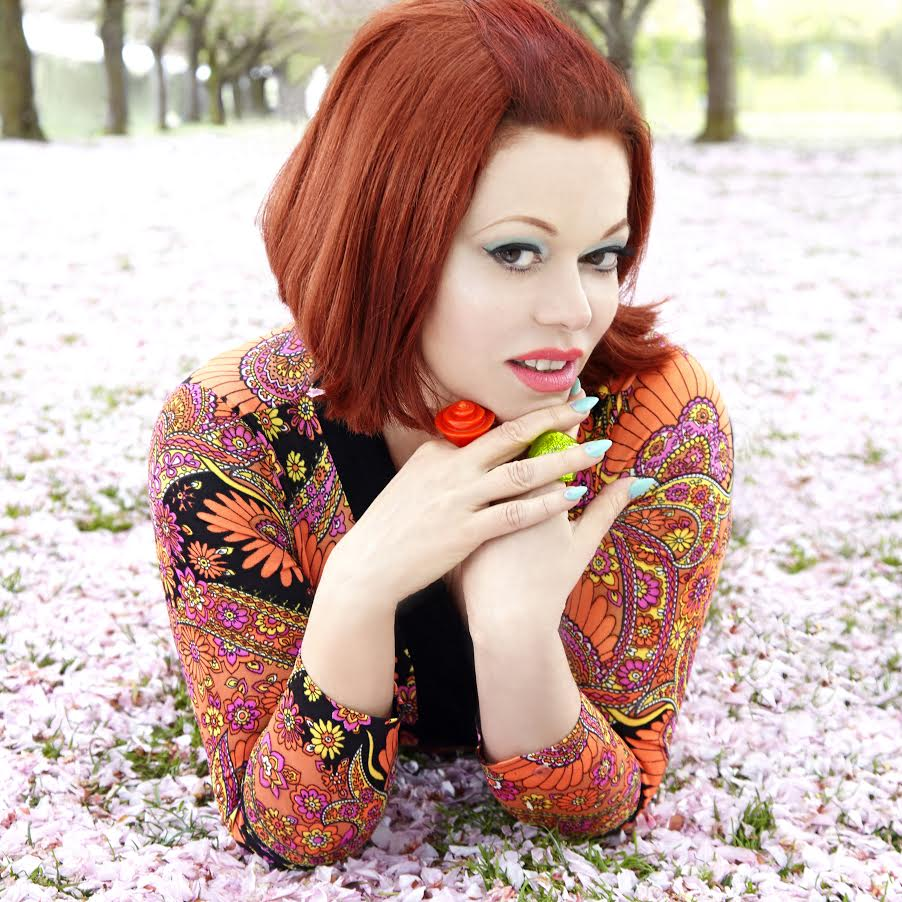
- Lady Miss Kier in 2005

Background information
- Also known as: Lady Kier, Kier Kirby
- Born: Kierin Michele Kirby; August 15, 1963 (age 63); Youngstown, Ohio, U.S.
- Origin: New York City, U.S.
- Genres: Electronica; dance-pop; house; hip hop
- Occupations: Singer, songwriter, DJ, producer
- Instrument: Vocals
- Years active: 1986–present
- Labels: Elektra; Pluto Moon
- Formerly of: Deee-Lite
- Website: ladykier.com

Kierin Magenta Kirby (born August 15, 1963), known professionally as Lady Miss Kier, is an American singer, songwriter and DJ. Lady Miss Kier was the vocalist for the band Deee-Lite. She is a social, environmental, and human rights activist.

== Early life ==
Kirby was born in Youngstown, Ohio. As a child, she lived in Pittsburgh, Virginia Beach, and Washington, D.C. At the age of 17, she moved to New York City to study fashion design at the Fashion Institute of Technology but she was disillusioned by the teachers and dropped out immediately. When she dropped out, she started to design and make her own eccentric disco-inspired clothes that she then sold to people she met at nightclubs.

== Music career ==
=== Deee-Lite ===
In 1982, Kirby met Ukrainian-born Dmitry Brill ("Super DJ Dmitry") and designed, made, and sold him silver platform boots and a glitter blue spacesuit, for his band, Shazork. In 1986, she began experimenting with singing and writing music with Brill to form the band Deee-Lite.

Shortly after their first show in 1986, Brill was introduced to Towa Tei, a Japanese DJ of Korean descent. Several years later, Kirby and Brill invited him to join their band. Combining Kirby's vocal and writing talents with Brill's sampling skills and Tei's techno mixing, the three formed the band Deee-Lite. She continued to make a living as a waitress and go-go dancer until the band signed a seven-album deal with Elektra Records.

Deee-Lite's sound was a mix of house music, techno and electronic dance music. Deee-Lite shot to stardom in 1990 with the release of their first album World Clique and the hit "Groove Is in the Heart.” At the 1991 MTV Video Music Awards, Deee-Lite was nominated for several awards, including Video of the Year and Best New Artist. Within the group, Kirby took on the larger-than-life alter-ego "Lady Miss Kier.” Kirby's initial look relied on revamped and exaggerated retro style 1960s fashion. Her signature look was a zip-up catsuit, platform shoes and flipped hair-do.

In 1992, the band released their second album, Infinity Within, a politically charged work. Their third album Dewdrops in the Garden was released in 1994. Neither of the two follow-up albums matched the commercial success of the debut album.

Deee-lite disbanded in 1995 after Brill and Kirby's relationship fractured. In 1996, a remix album was released. A greatest hits album was released in 2001.

=== International DJ and songwriting solo career ===
In 1995, after quitting the band, Lady Miss Kier moved to London where she began touring as a disc jockey and learning the technical end of production, recording, and engineering. In the late 1990s, she collaborated on the albums of Bootsy Collins, I Kamanchi and A Guy Called Gerald. In 2002, she contributed an exclusive solo track called "I'm Not Staying at Home" to the compilation Straight Up & Dirty. Since going solo, she has featured and co-written with artists such as Full Cycle, George Clinton, Walter "Junie" Morrison, A Guy Called Gerald, Apollo Heights, and several P-Funk luminaries. Outside of the studio, she showcased her live performances with new material for various music, film, and art festivals, as well as headlining several gay pride events worldwide. In 2012, she began performing a Deee-Lite tribute for various occasions, including the 2013 Paris Fashion Week for Kenzo as well as a tribute to New York City disc jockey Mark Kamins at Santos Party House.

She performed as a disc jockey at clubs and music festivals including Coachella Festival (2007), Berlin's Berghain (2010) and Sydney Mardi Gras (2012), as well as radio programs such as East Village Radio and SiriusXM.

=== Live performances ===
In 2005, motivated by the invasion of Iraq, she began internationally performing live new unreleased music, including the DFA release covering George Clinton's anti-war song "Bullet Proof". She has headlined numerous festivals and gay pride events as well as opened for James Brown's last tour at the Good Vibrations festival in Australia.

== Fashion recognition ==
Kirby has received the following recognition in the fashion industry:

- In 1990, she was on the cover of Vogue Italia.
- In 1991, when designer Emilio Pucci was given a lifetime achievement award from the Council of Fashion Designers of America, she was asked to star in the tribute video.
- She collaborated frequently with designer Thierry Mugler throughout the 1990s.
- In 2010, Elle named her one of Music's 25 Most Influential Style Icons along with Grace Jones, Beyoncé, Debbie Harry, and MIA.
- In 2010, Glamour named Kier as one of the Top Influential Music Style Icons with Rihanna, Lady Gaga, and Gwen Stefani.
- In 2012, Vogue quoted her experience with John Fluevog and the rise of "The Munster" platform shoe, which was made famous as a symbol of the 1990s house/club underground DJ scene. Fluevog Shoes credits her as the reason the shoe became popular. Vice noted that "Indeed, Lady Miss Kier's taste for the massive John Fluevog platform shoes she famously wore on their first album cover helped propel the early 90s into a 70s fashion revival."
- In 2012, Rookie declared her a style icon.
- Shoe designer Jerome Rousseau named a shoe "Kier Iridescent Sandals" after her.
- In 2013, Ladygunn magazine featured a full spread on Kier in its Legends issue.
- In 2015, she was an inspiration for designer Jeremy Scott's Fall 2016 line, which debuted at New York Fashion Week.
- In 2015, Essie Weingarten's nail polish brand released a pink polish inspired by her, called "Groove Is in the Heart."
- In 2015, Givenchy's Milan Fashion Week show drew inspiration from her, borrowing a lyric from her World Clique album song "Power of Love," using the line "I believe in the power of love" as part of the branding of the debut of its Fall 2016 line.
- In 2016, an article in Vogue referred to Kier as a "Club Kid Icon," detailing how world class designers know her as a "legend and a lady," and highlighting how designers such as Thierry Mugler have borrowed from her look.
- In 2022, an advertisement for Christian Dior's "Dior Addict" included a cover of the Deee-lite song "What Is Love?" It was published to YouTube and titled "Dior Addict - The New Icon of Shine."

== Movies and books ==
In 2018, the Netflix series Big Mouth used her song "Groove Is in the Heart" for an abortion sequence. In 1995, Lady Kier was featured in Wigstock: The Movie, which included live footage of her performing and a song on the soundtrack. In 2001, she was included in Summer Love: The Rave-umentary. In 2005, Lady Miss Kier was the featured artist on the podcast Ron-Kat-Delic Show. Her words also were shared through a number of published books, including Verbal Abuse – No 3 by Chi Chi Valenti, Creative Time: The Book: 33 Years of Public Art in New York by Anne Pasternak, Creative License: The Law and Culture of Digital Sampling by Kembrew McLeod and Peter DiCola, and All Music Guide to Electronica: The Definitive Guide to Electronic Music by Vladimir Bogdanov.

== Panels and appearances ==
Lady Miss Kier has spoken at Princeton University's "Youth Music and Youth Culture", Cooper Union's multimedia presentation "Hiccup" in 1993, Apple's 1995 "Future Arts Panel" with Peter Gabriel and Electronic Frontier Foundation founder, John Perry Barlow, George Washington University's Law School Summit Future of Music Coalition in 2007 and New York University's "NYU Panel Nelson Sullivan: Vlogging in the 80s" in 2013. In 2013 she was featured in an exhibit entitled "NYC 1993", which was presented through New York City's New Museum. Beyond the installation, her voice recording was played via pay phones throughout the New York area. In 2013, Lady Miss Kier was the featured voiceover artist in The Jazz Foundation of America's animated promo for the event "A Great Night in Harlem".

== Space Channel 5 and lawsuit ==
In April 2003, Kirby sued video game company Sega, claiming the character of "Ulala" in its Dreamcast game Space Channel 5 was an unauthorized use of her likeness. Kirby became aware of the game in July 2000, when a Sega affiliate contacted Kirby to determine if she was interested in promoting the game in England utilizing the Deee-Lite song "Groove Is in the Heart". Kirby rejected the offer.

During the lawsuit, Kirby alleged that the final video game product used her resemblance in the game, including the name Ulala for a character – allegedly referencing Kirby's signature performance phrase "Ooh la la". Sega showed how the game and character had been created and released in Japan between 1997 and 1999, before Kirby was contacted. The developers claimed they had never heard of either Kirby, Deee-lite, or their music.

The case lasted until 2006, when the judge ruled in favor of Sega and Kirby lost her appeal. The judge ruled that regardless of exactly when the "Ulala" character was created, the character did not have a close enough resemblance to Kirby to establish misappropriation of likeness. Kirby was obliged to pay Sega's legal fees of $608,000 (reduced from $763,000 on request).

"Groove Is in the Heart" was later licensed for use in Sega's 2008 Wii port of Samba de Amigo, used in a section of the game where the Ulala character appears.

== Political views and activism ==
Lady Kier is a social, environmental, and human rights activist. She is also a vocal advocate for LGBTQ rights and is a straight ally. As such, she has been invited to be a host, performer, master of ceremonies, and disc jockey at pride parades.

She supports reproductive rights and is a women's rights advocate. She was featured in a TV informercial promoting pro-choice rights with “The Most Exciting Women in Music" political action group alongside Corina, Juliet Cuming, Kim Gordon (Sonic Youth), MC Lyte, Kate Pierson (The B-52's), Crystal Waters, and Tina Weymouth (Talking Heads, Tom Tom Club) in 1991. In 1991, Lady Miss Kier was an award presenter at the Reebok Human Rights Awards.

She supports the environmentalist movement. The 1992 Deee-Lite album Infinity Within was the first CD released using eco-pak packaging, cutting the amount of plastic used by half. On that album, she called attention to the issue of ozone depletion with her song "I Had a Dream I Was Falling Through a Hole in the Ozone Layer.” Vogue Magazine has highlighted her "interest in supporting environmental causes.”

She supports the anti-war movement and in 2010, she released a version of the P-Funk track "Bullet Proof" with Ray Mang; she had performed it before in 2005, during her world tour. She also supports the get out the vote movement. Her music video for the song "Vote Baby Vote,” which she wrote "to get people interested in voting so they could vote George Bush out,” was featured for MTV's "Rock the Vote" campaign in 1992 and was highlighted by Rolling Stone as one of the top "ten major moments in rock the vote history.”

During the 2016 United States presidential election, she supported Bernie Sanders. She hosted an art exhibit at Hole Gallery in New York City and a fundraiser called "Bernin' Up NYC" to rally Sanders supporters.
