= Xoa =

xoa

Studio album by Anaïs Mitchell
- Released: September 30, 2014
- Genre: Country
- Label: Wilderland Records

Anaïs Mitchell chronology
Child Ballads (2013)	xoa (2014)	Anaïs Mitchell (2022)

Professional ratings
Review scores
Source	Rating
Folk Radio UK	Favorable
Financial Times	4/5

xoa is the seventh studio album by American singer-songwriter Anaïs Mitchell, released in 2014 on Wilderland Records, on 30 September in the US and October the 6th in the UK.

== Background ==
The album, recorded with Gary Paczosa in Nashville, features new songs and re-recorded tracks from Mitchell's back catalogue. The record saw a limited release, and was meant as a thank you to fans, Anaïs saying "if the title were longer, it would be 'dear audience, thank you for everything'". "Any Way the Wind Blows" was later featured in the musical adaptation of her fourth studio album Hadestown.

== Track listing ==
1. "Any Way the Wind Blows" – 2:30
2. "Out of Pawn" (from The Brightness) – 4:13
3. "Your Fonder Heart" (from The Brightness) – 3:21
4. "Why We Build the Wall" (from Hadestown) – 3:35
5. "Now You Know" – 3:09
6. "If It's True" (from Hadestown) – 3:18
7. "Namesake" (from The Brightness) – 2:41
8. "Young Man in America" (from Young Man in America) – 4:02
9. "Two Kids" (from Hymns for the Exiled) – 3:46
10. "The Pursewarden Affair" – 2:31
11. "His Kiss, the Riot" (from Hadestown) – 2:32
12. "Come September" (from Country (EP)) – 2:50
13. "You Are Forgiven" (from Young Man in America) – 3:23
14. "Our Lady of the Underground" (from Hadestown) – 3:18
15. "Cosmic American" (from Hymns for the Exiled) – 3:41
