= Hadestown cast recordings =

Albums of the musical

The musical Hadestown, written by American singer-songwriter Anaïs Mitchell and based on her 2010 studio album of the same name, has had two official cast recordings. In addition, various songs from Hadestown were re-recorded by Mitchell for her 2014 studio album Xoa, including the musical's opening number "Anyway the Wind Blows" which had not appeared on the original concept album. The song "Why We Build the Wall" has been covered by a variety of artists, including English singer-songwriter Billy Bragg for his 2017 EP Bridges Not Walls, Ben Fisher, Ben Dunham, Lilli Lewis, and Robert Neustadt.

== Live Original Cast Recording ==
Hadestown: The Myth. The Musical. (Live Original Cast Recording)

Cast recording by Hadestown Original Cast
- Released: October 6, 2017
- Recorded: June 28–29, 2016
- Studio: New York Theatre Workshop
- Genres: Showtunes, Folk, jazz
- Labels: Ghostlight Records, Parlophone Records

Hadestown: The Myth. The Musical. (Live Original Cast Recording) is the cast album of the 2016 Off-Broadway production at New York Theatre Workshop, released October 6, 2017 through Ghostlight Records and Parlophone Records on digital and CD. Recorded during the performances on June 28 and 29, 2016, the live album debuted at number 3 on the Billboard Cast Albums chart.

The promotional four-track EP Why We Build The Wall (Selections from Hadestown. The Myth. The Musical. Live Original Cast Recording) was released for digital retailers on October 13, 2016, containing live recordings of "Way Down Hadestown", "All I've Ever Known", "Wait For Me", and "Why We Build the Wall".

=== Track listing ===
All tracks are written by Anaïs Mitchell.

No.	Title	Performer(s)	Length
1.	"Road to Hell (Live)"	Chris Sullivan, Hadestown Original Cast	2:48
2.	"Livin' It Up On Top (Live)"	Amber Gray, Chris Sullivan, Damon Daunno, Hadestown Original Cast	3:52
3.	"All I've Ever Known (Live)"	Nabiyah Be, Damon Daunno	2:43
4.	"Way Down Hadestown (Live)"	Chris Sullivan, Amber Gray, Patrick Page, Damon Daunno, Nabiyah Be, Lulu Fall, Jessie Shelton, Hadestown Original Cast	4:55
5.	"Epic II (Live)"	Damon Daunno, Hadestown Original Cast	2:46
6.	"Chant (Live)"	Amber Gray, Patrick Page, Nabiyah Be, Damon Daunno, Lulu Fall, Jessie Shelton, Shaina Taub, Hadestown Original Cast	5:27
7.	"Hey Little Songbird (Live)"	Patrick Page, Nabiyah Be	3:47
8.	"When the Chips are Down (Live)"	Lulu Fall, Jessie Shelton, Shaina Taub	2:34
9.	"Gone I'm Gone (Live)"	Nabiyah Be, Lulu Fall, Jessie Shelton, Shaina Taub	1:33
10.	"Wait For Me (Live)"	Damon Daunno, Chris Sullivan, Hadestown Original Cast	2:48
11.	"Why We Build the Wall (Live)"	Patrick Page, Nabiyah Be, Chris Sullivan, Hadestown Original Cast	5:04
12.	"Our Lady of the Underground (Live)"	Amber Gray, Hadestown Original Cast	5:29
13.	"Way Down Hadestown II (Live)"	Chris Sullivan, Nabiyah Be, Lulu Fall, Jessie Shelton, Shaina Taub	4:18
14.	"Chant II (Live)"	Amber Gray, Patrick Page, Chris Sullivan, Nabiyah Be, Damon Daunno, Hadestown Original Cast	5:05
15.	"Epic III (Live)"	Damon Daunno, Patrick Page, Hadestown Original Cast	5:17
16.	"Word to the Wise (Live)"	Lulu Fall, Jessie Shelton, Shaina Taub	0:54
17.	"His Kiss the Riot (Live)"	Patrick Page	3:49
18.	"Promises (Live)"	Nabiyah Be, Damon Daunno, Hadestown Original Cast	3:29
19.	"Wait For Me II (Live)"	Chris Sullivan, Amber Gray, Patrick Page, Nabiyah Be, Hadestown Original Cast	2:10
20.	"Doubt Comes In (Live)"	Lulu Fall, Jessie Shelton, Shaina Taub, Damon Daunno, Nabiyah Be	3:33
21.	"Road to Hell II (Live)"	Chris Sullivan, Amber Gray, Hadestown Original Cast	3:12

== Original Broadway Cast Recording ==
Hadestown (Original Broadway Cast Recording)

Cast recording by Hadestown Original Broadway Cast
- Released: July 26, 2019
- Genres: Showtunes, Folk, Jazz, Americana
- Length: 2:02:38
- Label: Sing It Again
- Producers: Mara Isaacs; David Lai; Anaïs Mitchell; Todd Sickafoose

Hadestown (Original Broadway Cast Recording) is the official recording of the Broadway production of Hadestown. It was originally announced to be released on June 7, 2019, on all major digital and streaming platforms, but on May 31 it was revealed that due to delays in production only a selection of music would be released on that date, with the rest of the cast album released in "character drops" over the course of the next few weeks, with the full album available on July 26. A compact disc and vinyl release followed on November 1 and November 29, 2019, respectively. Unlike the original live recording, the Broadway cast recording contains the complete score. The 40-track recording won Best Musical Theater Album at the 62nd Annual Grammy Awards.

=== Promotion ===
The first drop on June 7, 2019, contained the songs "Livin' It Up on Top," "When the Chips are Down Intro," "When the Chips are Down," "Gone, I'm Gone," "Wait For Me Intro," "Wait For Me," "Why We Build the Wall," "Why We Build the Wall Outro," "Our Lady of the Underground," "Flowers," and "Road to Hell (Reprise)." The second drop, themed around Hades and Persephone, was released on June 28 and featured "Way Down Hadestown," "Hey, Little Songbird," "Papers Intro," "Papers Instrumental," "How Long?," "Chant (Reprise)," and "We Raise Our Cups." The third drop on July 12 was themed around Hermes, The Fates, and the Workers' Chorus and featured "Road to Hell," "Chant," "A Gathering Storm," "Way Down Hadestown (Reprise)," "Nothing Changes," "Word to the Wise," "Wait for Me (Reprise) Intro," and "Wait For Me (Reprise)." The final character drop on July 26 was themed around Orpheus and Eurydice and contained the remaining songs from the cast album.

=== Track listing ===
All tracks are written by Anaïs Mitchell.

No.	Title	Performer(s)	Length
1.	"Road to Hell"	André De Shields and Hadestown Original Broadway Company	5:17
2.	"Any Way the Wind Blows"	Eva Noblezada, Jewelle Blackman, Yvette Gonzalez-Nacer and Kay Trinidad	3:45
3.	"Come Home with Me"	Reeve Carney, Eva Noblezada, André De Shields, Afra Hines, Timothy Hughes, Kimberly Marable, John Krause and Ahmad Simmons	1:47
4.	"Wedding Song"	Reeve Carney, Eva Noblezada, Afra Hines, Timothy Hughes, John Krause, Ahmad Simmons and Kimberly Marable	3:33
5.	"Epic I"	Reeve Carney and André De Shields	3:12
6.	"Livin' It Up on Top"	Amber Gray, André De Shields, Reeve Carney and Hadestown Original Broadway Company	5:29
7.	"All I've Ever Known (Intro) ("In spite of herself...")"	André De Shields	0:40
8.	"All I've Ever Known"	Eva Noblezada and Reeve Carney	4:03
9.	"Way Down Hadestown"	Hadestown Original Broadway Company	5:00
10.	"A Gathering Storm"	André De Shields, Reeve Carney, Eva Noblezada, Jewelle Blackman, Yvette Gonzalez-Nacer and Kay Trinidad	1:34
11.	"Epic II"	Reeve Carney	2:26
12.	"Chant"	Hadestown Original Broadway Company	6:31
13.	"Hey, Little Songbird"	Patrick Page and Eva Noblezada	3:36
14.	"When the Chips Are Down (Intro) ("Songbird vs. rattlesnake...")"	André De Shields	0:20
15.	"When the Chips Are Down"	Jewelle Blackman, Yvette Gonzalez-Nacer, Kay Trinidad and Eva Noblezada	2:14
16.	"Gone, I'm Gone"	Eva Noblezada, Jewelle Blackman, Yvette Gonzalez-Nacer and Kay Trinidad	1:42
17.	"Wait for Me (Intro) ("Hey, the big artiste...")"	André De Shields and Reeve Carney	1:31
18.	"Wait for Me"	André De Shields, Reeve Carney, Jewelle Blackman, Yvette Gonzalez-Nacer, Kay Trinidad, Timothy Hughes, Malcolm Armwood, Jessie Shelton, Kimberly Marable, Khaila Wilcoxon, Ahmad Simmons, Afra Hines, T. Oliver Reid and John Krause	3:34
19.	"Why We Build the Wall"	Patrick Page and Hadestown Original Broadway Company	4:02
20.	"Why We Build the Wall (Outro) ("Behind closed doors...")"	André De Shields	0:57
21.	"Our Lady of the Underground"	Amber Gray	5:24
22.	"Way Down Hadestown (Reprise)"	André De Shields, Jewelle Blackman, Yvette Gonzalez-Nacer, Kay Trinidad, Eva Noblezada, Timothy Hughes, Malcolm Armwood, Jessie Shelton, Kimberly Marable, Khaila Wilcoxon, Ahmad Simmons, Afra Hines, T. Oliver Reid and John Krause	3:50
23.	"Flowers"	Eva Noblezada	3:32
24.	"Come Home with Me (Reprise)"	Reeve Carney and Eva Noblezada	1:01
25.	"Papers (Intro) ("You're not from around here, son...")"	Patrick Page, Amber Gray, André De Shields, Eva Noblezada and Reeve Carney	1:53
26.	"Papers (Instrumental)"	Hadestown Original Broadway Band	1:14
27.	"Nothing Changes"	Jewelle Blackman, Yvette Gonzalez-Nacer and Kay Trinidad	1:14
28.	"If It's True"	Reeve Carney, André De Shields, Afra Hines, Timothy Hughes, John Krause, Kimberly Marable and Ahmad Simmons	4:13
29.	"How Long?"	Amber Gray and Patrick Page	3:41
30.	"Chant (Reprise)"	Hadestown Original Broadway Company	4:01
31.	"Epic III"	Reeve Carney and Hadestown Original Broadway Company	5:51
32.	"Epic III (Instrumental) ("They danced...")"	Hadestown Original Broadway Band	1:39
33.	"Promises"	Eva Noblezada and Reeve Carney	2:43
34.	"Word to the Wise"	Jewelle Blackman, Yvette Gonzalez-Nacer and Kay Trinidad	1:20
35.	"His Kiss, the Riot"	Patrick Page	3:05
36.	"Wait for Me (Reprise) (Intro) ("If you wanna walk out of hell...")"	André De Shields, Reeve Carney, Eva Noblezada, Afra Hines, Timothy Hughes, Kimberly Marable, John Krause and Ahmad Simmons	1:36
37.	"Wait for Me (Reprise)"	André De Shields and Hadestown Original Broadway Company	3:12
38.	"Doubt Comes In"	Reeve Carney, Eva Noblezada, Jewelle Blackman, Yvette Gonzalez-Nacer, Kay Trinidad, Afra Hines, John Krause, Kimberly Marable, Timothy Hughes and Ahmad Simmons	4:51
39.	"Road to Hell (Reprise)"	André De Shields and Hadestown Original Broadway Company	5:00
40.	"We Raise Our Cups"	Amber Gray, Eva Noblezada and Hadestown Original Broadway Company	2:05

=== Charts ===
Chart (2019)	Peak position
US Billboard 200 (Billboard)	49
US Independent Albums (Billboard)	4
US Cast Albums (Billboard)	1

Chart (2024)	Peak position
UK Compilation Albums (Official Charts)	40
UK Soundtrack Albums (Official Charts)	1

=== Year-end charts ===
Chart (2019)	Position
US Cast Albums	6
Chart (2020)	Position
US Cast Albums	4

== If the Fates Allow: A Hadestown Holiday Album ==
If the Fates Allow: A Hadestown Holiday Album

Cast recording by Various Artists
- Released: November 20, 2020
- Genres: Christmas; blues; folk; ragtime; jazz
- Length: 56:40
- Labels: Broadway Records; Sing It Again
- Producers: David Lai; Todd Sickafoose; Liam Robinson; Yvette Gonzalez-Nacer

If the Fates Allow: A Hadestown Holiday Album is a Christmas album by the Original Broadway Cast of Hadestown that was released on November 20, 2020, through Broadway Records. Principal vocals were provided by Yvette Gonzalez-Nacer, Kay Trinidad, and Jewelle Blackman, with additional appearances from the rest of the cast. The album features "beloved holiday classics as well as songs composed by Gonzalez-Nacer, Hadestown's Tony-winning songwriter Anaïs Mitchell, and Hadestown music director Liam Robinson".

=== Track listing ===
All songs performed by Jewelle Blackman, Yvette Gonzalez-Nacer, and Kay Trinidad.

No.	Title	Writer(s)	Length
1.	"Thank God It's Christmas" (featuring Hadestown Original Broadway Company)	Brian May; Roger Taylor	4:22
2.	"Sleigh Ride"	Leroy Anderson	3:52
3.	"Come Healing" (featuring Patrick Page)	Leonard Cohen; Patrick Leonard	3:43
4.	"Song of the Magi"	Anaïs Mitchell	4:02
5.	"Lo, How a Rose E'er Blooming"	Traditional	4:41
6.	"Purple Snowflakes"	Marvin Gaye	3:31
7.	"Blue Christmas" (featuring André De Shields)	Billy Hayes; Jay W. Johnson	3:49
8.	"Winter Song" (featuring Reeve Carney & Eva Noblezada)	Sara Bareilles	4:08
9.	"Gift for an Angel"	Seth L. Johnson; Gonzalez-Nacer	3:49
10.	"Someday at Christmas"	Ron Miller; Bryan Wells	3:35
11.	"The Longest Winter" (featuring Amber Gray)	Jean Rohe; Liam Robinson	4:31
12.	"8 Days (Of Hanukkah)"	The Dap-Kings; Wayne Gordon	3:19
13.	"'Twas the Night"	Clement Clarke Moore; Lynne Shankel	4:54
14.	"Have Yourself a Merry Little Christmas"	Hugh Martin; Ralph Blane	4:24

== West End cast recording ==
Hadestown: Live from London

Cast recording by Hadestown Original West End Cast
- Released: December 6, 2024
- Recorded: August 25, 2024 (most tracks)
- Venue: Lyric Theatre, London
- Genres: Showtunes, Folk, Jazz
- Length: 1:09:21 (CD and digital)
- Labels: Rhino; Sing It Again
- Producers: Todd Sickafoose; David Lye

Hadestown: Live from London is the cast album of the 2024 West End production at the Lyric Theatre, London. It was released digitally, on CD, and on vinyl record on December 6, 2024. The majority of tracks were recorded at the final performance of Grace Hodgett Young and Dónal Finn on August 25, 2024.

=== Track listing ===
Track listing from the digital releases of the album. The CD release divides tracks differently. Several tracks are exclusive to the CD and digital releases of the album, and do not appear on the vinyl release.

All tracks are written by Anaïs Mitchell.

No.	Title	Performer(s)	Length
1.	"Road to Hell"	Melanie La Barrie, Original West End Company of Hadestown	6:15
2.	"Come Home With Me" (CD and digital exclusive)	Melanie La Barrie, Dónal Finn, Grace Hodgett Young, Original West End Company of Hadestown	2:45
3.	"Wedding Song"	Dónal Finn, Grace Hodgett Young, Original West End Company of Hadestown	3:45
4.	"Livin' It Up on Top"	Gloria Onitiri, Melanie La Barrie, Dónal Finn, Original West End Company of Hadestown	5:45
5.	"All I've Ever Known ("In Spite of Herself"…) [Intro]" (CD and digital exclusive)	Melanie La Barrie	0:41
6.	"All I've Ever Known" (CD and digital exclusive)	Grace Hodgett Young, Dónal Finn	4:15
7.	"Way Down Hadestown"	Melanie La Barrie, Gloria Onitiri, Original West End Company of Hadestown	5:10
8.	"Chant" (CD and digital exclusive)	Original West End Company of Hadestown	6:34
9.	"When the Chips Are Down ("Songbird vs. Rattlesnake"…) [Intro]"	Melanie La Barrie	0:18
10.	"When the Chips Are Down"	Bella Brown, Madeline Charlemagne, Allie Daniel, Grace Hodgett Young	2:14
11.	"Wait for Me ("Hey, The Big Artiste"…) [Intro]"	Melanie La Barrie, Dónal Finn	1:32
12.	"Wait for Me"	Melanie La Barrie, Dónal Finn, Bella Brown, Madeline Charlemagne, Allie Daniel, Original West End Company of Hadestown	3:52
13.	"Why We Build the Wall" (CD and digital exclusive)	Zachary James, Original West End Company of Hadestown	3:55
14.	"Why We Build the Wall ("Behind Closed Doors"…) [Outro]" (CD and digital exclusive)	Melanie La Barrie	1:05
15.	"If It's True"	Dónal Finn, Melanie La Barrie, Original West End Company of Hadestown	4:24
16.	"Epic III"	Dónal Finn, Original West End Company of Hadestown	5:58
17.	"Epic III ("They Danced"…)"	Melanie La Barrie, Dónal Finn	1:31
18.	"Promises" (CD and digital exclusive)	Dónal Finn, Grace Hodgett Young	2:49
19.	"Wait for Me (Reprise)"	Melanie La Barrie, Original West End Company of Hadestown	3:21
20.	"Road to Hell (Reprise)"	Melanie La Barrie, Original West End Company of Hadestown	3:12

=== Charts ===
Chart performance for Hadestown: Live from London
Chart (2026)	Peak position
US Cast Albums (Billboard)	9
