= Hadestown: The Musical =

- Theatrical release poster
- Directed by: Brett Sullivan
- Written by: Anaïs Mitchell
- Based on: Orpheus and Eurydice and Hades and Persephone
- Produced by: Mara Isaacs; Dale Franzen; Hunter Arnold; Tom Kirdahy
- Starring: Reeve Carney; André De Shields; Amber Gray; Eva Noblezada; Patrick Page
- Distributed by: Crosswalk and LD Entertainment (United States and United Kingdom); Universal Pictures (United Kingdom; through Trafalgar Releasing)
- Release dates: 8 June 2026 (Tribeca); 24 July 2026 (United States); 13 October 2026 (United Kingdom)
- Running time: 142 minutes
- Countries: United Kingdom; United States
- Language: English
- Box office: $23.6 million

Hadestown: The Musical is a 2026 musical film presenting a live stage recording of the musical of the same name. The film was directed by Brett Sullivan and features five principal cast members of the original Broadway production. Recorded at the Lyric Theatre, London, the remainder of the cast are performers in the West End production. Bleecker Street division Crosswalk launched a limited release for North American cinemas beginning July 24, 2026.

== Synopsis ==
=== Act I ===
The Greek god Hermes welcomes the audience to the show, introducing the story, characters, ensemble, and band ("Road to Hell"). Eurydice and the Fates describe Eurydice’s cynical worldview as well as the harsh weather and famine ("Any Way the Wind Blows"). Orpheus, Hermes' ward, introduces himself to Eurydice and abruptly asks her to marry him ("Come Home with Me"). Eurydice is doubtful, as they both live in poverty. Orpheus tells her that he is writing a song to make spring come again, and they will no longer have to endure hardship ("Wedding Song").

Prompted by Hermes, Orpheus tells the story of Hades and Persephone ("Epic I"). Persephone arrives in the world above and celebrates summertime ("Livin' it Up on Top"), while Eurydice begins to fall in love with Orpheus ("All I've Ever Known"). Hades comes early to collect Persephone, who voices her misery at having to return to Hadestown, Hades' underground factory. Despite hearing about the never-ending labor endured by the factory workers, Eurydice is intrigued by the Fates' rich praise of Hadestown, and its promise of protection ("Way Down Hadestown"). The cold weather returns, and Eurydice searches for food and firewood, urging Orpheus to finish his song ("A Gathering Storm"). Orpheus continues working on his song ("Epic II") as Eurydice becomes more desperate as times grow harder.

After Persephone and Hades argue ("Chant"), Hades leaves Hadestown to find someone who will appreciate its safety and security. He comes across a desperate Eurydice, who has become caught in a snowstorm, and invites her to come to Hadestown ("Hey, Little Songbird"), and the Fates urge Eurydice to join him ("When the Chips Are Down"). With the cold surging and an empty stomach, Eurydice sees no other choice except to follow Hades. She bids goodbye to the preoccupied Orpheus and heads to Hadestown; the Fates chastise the audience for judging her for choosing self-interest over love ("Gone, I'm Gone"). Orpheus realizes Eurydice is missing and resolves to rescue her from Hadestown. Using Hermes' instructions, he travels to Hadestown the long way without the use of the train ("Wait for Me"). As Hades revels in his power and dominion over the denizens of his realm ("Why We Build the Wall"), Eurydice arrives in Hadestown and signs a contract to become a worker in Hadestown.

=== Act II ===
Persephone sings to the patrons of a speakeasy that she runs behind Hades's back ("Our Lady of the Underground"). Eurydice begins to recognize the consequences of her choice to go to Hadestown: she will become a forgotten laborer and can never leave unless Hades lets her go ("Way Down Hadestown" (reprise)). Regretting her decision, she begins to forget her life and the world above ("Flowers").

Orpheus arrives in Hadestown and promises Eurydice that he will take her home ("Come Home with Me" (reprise)). Hades tells him that Eurydice willingly signed the contract and orders the workers to attack Orpheus ("Papers"). The Fates tell him to give up hope ("Nothing Changes"). Orpheus vows to find a way to free Eurydice, rallying the workers and catching Persephone's attention in the process ("If It's True").

Persephone is inspired by Orpheus's determination and pleads with Hades to let Eurydice go ("How Long?"). While the workers begin to question the freedom they were promised, Hades challenges Orpheus to sing his completed song, threatening to kill him afterwards ("Chant" (reprise)). Orpheus sings his song, reminding Hades of his love for Persephone ("Epic III"). Hades and Persephone reconcile with a dance ("Epic III ('They Danced...')"), after which Orpheus and Eurydice promise to stay together no matter the difficulty ("Promises"). Orpheus asks Hades if they may leave, and Hades tells him that he has not reached a decision. The Fates taunt Hades for his dilemma: If he kills Orpheus and keeps Eurydice captive, they become martyrs, but if he lets them go, he loses control over his workers as they have begun to agitate for their freedom ("Word to the Wise"). Hades lets Orpheus and Eurydice go on one condition: Orpheus must lead them out single file. If he turns around to confirm that Eurydice is following him, she will return to Hadestown and remain there forever ("His Kiss, the Riot").

Hermes explains the condition to Orpheus and Eurydice, and they begin the long, frightening walk out, as the workers look to them for hope. Persephone and Hades decide to give their own relationship another chance ("Wait for Me" (reprise)). Just as Orpheus reaches the end, he is overcome by doubt and turns around, condemning Eurydice to return to Hadestown ("Doubt Comes In"). Hermes reflects on the somber tale and why it must be told, as the story resets to the beginning, and the company begins to tell it again ("Road to Hell" (reprise)). After the curtain call, the performer playing Persephone leads the cast in honoring Orpheus for his optimism and bravery ("We Raise Our Cups").

== Cast ==
- Reeve Carney as Orpheus
- André De Shields as Hermes
- Amber Gray as Persephone
- Eva Noblezada as Eurydice
- Patrick Page as Hades
- Bella Brown as Clotho, one of the Fates
- Madeline Charlemagne as Lachesis, one of the Fates
- Allie Daniel as Atropos, one of the Fates
- Lauren Azania as a worker
- Tiago Dhondt Bamberger as a worker
- Ryesha Higgs as a worker
- Waylon Jacobs as a worker
- Christopher Short as a worker

== Production ==
Footage was captured during three live performances on February 28 and March 1, 2025. However, only two of these performances featured Patrick Page (Hades) as he had torn his Achilles tendon in the months prior to shooting. Given that the actors can be filmed from the stage itself, the proshot allows for details that cannot be seen as a member of the audience, such as a shot from the stage lift as people enter and exit Hadestown.

In the behind-the-scenes footage shown before the opening number, Page is shown putting on a medical boot that's been modified to match his character's dark and imposing aesthetic. Comparisons between the dog head cane and Cerberus have been made by fans and critics alike. Due to Page's injury, the dance performed between him and Amber Gray (Persephone) was modified.

== Release ==
Following its premiere at the Tribeca Film Festival on June 8, 2026, Bleecker Street's label Crosswalk and LD Entertainment acquired distribution rights in all English-speaking territories to the film, and released it in the United States on July 24, 2026; it was initially set for a five-day limited run before being extended due to popular demand. In August 2026, Bleecker Street sold distribution rights in the U.K., Ireland, Australia, New Zealand and South Africa to Universal Pictures; the latter plans to theatrically release the film in October through Trafalgar Releasing. It was released in the United Kingdom on October 13.

== Reception ==
On Rotten Tomatoes, 97% of 37 critic reviews are positive; the average rating is 9 out of 10. The website’s consensus reads: "Swathing classic themes in the sweltering rhythms of jazz while capturing all the action with crisp clarity, Hadestown: The Musical recreates the Broadway experience with transporting aplomb." According to Metacritic, the film received "universal acclaim" based on a weighted average score of 82 out of 100 from eight critic scores.

== See also ==
- Hadestown, 2010 concept album
- Hadestown cast recordings
