= Mipso =

US musical group

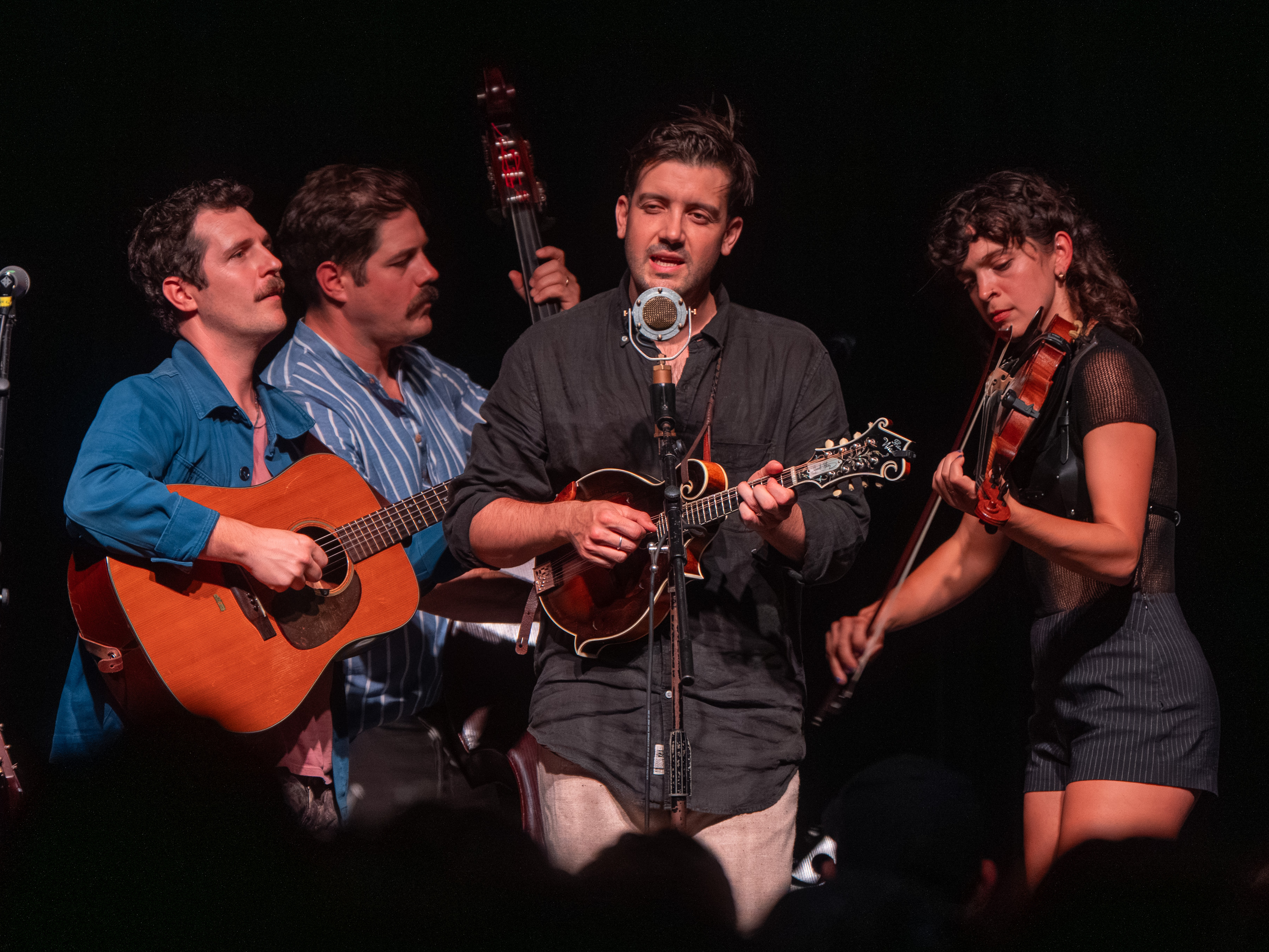
- Mipso in 2025

Background information
- Origin: Chapel Hill, North Carolina, US
- Genres: Bluegrass, Indie folk, Alternative country
- Instruments: vocals, guitar, mandolin, double bass, fiddle, banjo, keyboard
- Years active: 2013–2025
- Labels: Robust Records (2013–2017); Antifragile (2018); Rounder Records (2019–present)
- Members: Wood Robinson; Libby Rodenbough; Jacob Sharp; Joseph Terrell
- Website: mipsomusic.com

Mipso is a North Carolina quartet formed in Chapel Hill and known for combining a traditional string band format with close harmony and a variety of modern influences. The band is made up of Wood Robinson (Bass, Vocals), Jacob Sharp (Mandolin, Vocals), Joseph Terrell (Guitar, Vocals) and Libby Rodenbough (Fiddle, Vocals).

== Career ==
=== UNC Years and "Mipso Trio" ===
While students at UNC-Chapel Hill, guitarist Joseph Terrell and mandolin player Jacob Sharp began performing at Chapel Hill open mic nights as an acoustic duo. With the idea of forming a band to play folk and bluegrass, they approached bassist Wood Robinson, with whom Terrell had previously performed in a campus party band, Funkosaurus Rex. Billed as "Mipso Trio," the group began performing in 2011 at campus events and occasionally around North Carolina.

After partnering with local Chapel Hill record label Robust Records, the group recorded the album Long, Long Gone in 2012 and began performing regularly with friend and fiddle player, Libby Rodenbough. Mipso Trio quickly became a campus staple known for its many sold-out performances at the historic Cat's Cradle in Carrboro; for bridging the divide between the UNC music community and the broader music scene of North Carolina's Triangle; and for performing with members of the Red Clay Ramblers and former Chancellor of UNC-Chapel Hill, Holden Thorp, on numerous occasions.

Terrell, Sharp, and Rodenbough were recipients of the Morehead-Cain Scholarship given to exceptional students at UNC-Chapel Hill.

=== 2013 – 2018 ===
Upon graduation from UNC in 2013, Terrell, Sharp, and Robinson traveled on a two-week tour of Japan including performances at the 43rd annual Takarazuka Bluegrass Festival and a concert at Tokyo's historic country music venue, Rocky Top. A documentary of their trip to Japan, "Mipso In Japan," directed by filmmaker Jon Kasbe, premiered at film festivals across the country in 2014, including the NYC Picture Start Film Festival, Riverrun International Film Festival, and Indie Grits.

2013 also saw them release Dark Holler Pop with the newly truncated name "Mipso." Produced by Andrew Marlin and featuring members of Chatham County Line, Town Mountain, and Mandolin Orange, Dark Holler Pop was an exploration of bluegrass instrumentation and arrangements, with most songs featuring banjo and fiddle. The album was a surprise success, appearing on Billboard's Bluegrass chart and raising the band's profile considerably.

In 2014 the group continued to develop its sound, adding frequent collaborator Libby Rodenbough as a full-time member and touring around the US. In April 2014 guitarist Joseph Terrell won the General category of Merlefest's Chris Austin Songwriting Contest.

With the 2015 release, Old Time Reverie, again produced by Andrew Marlin, Mipso expanded into richer, occasionally darker, textures, adding the clawhammer banjo and electric organ. The album debuted at No. 1 on Billboard's Bluegrass chart.

Mipso performed on the KFC float in the 2015 Macy's Thanksgiving Day Parade.

The band began to expand their musicality with their third studio album, Coming Down the Mountain, released on April 7, 2017. This album saw the band add drums and slide guitar to their repertoire. The album spent five weeks on the Billboard Bluegrass chart, peaking at the third highest position.

In July of that year, the band was in a serious car accident in North Carolina. Their touring van was rear-ended by a truck, and then hit a series of other vehicles on the road. Terrell's air bag didn't deploy and he suffered a deep cut on his forehead and a broken nose. Much of their equipment was destroyed.

On April 6, 2018, Mipso released their fourth studio album Edges Run. Produced by Todd Sickafoose (Ani DiFranco, Andrew Bird, Anaïs Mitchell), it premiered two days before release date at PopMatters. The album saw Mipso return to the top of the bluegrass charts. The single "People Change" has been streamed over 100 million times on Spotify to date.

=== 2019 – 2025 ===
Mipso released 12 new tracks on their most recent eponymous album on October 16, 2020, their first on Rounder Records. The video for their track "Hourglass" premiered on PopMatters on October 7, 2020.

Band members have also released solo projects. Robinson released a solo album, Wood Robinson's New Formal, in 2016. Rodenbough also released a solo album on May 29, 2020, on Sleepy Cat Records called Spectacle of Love.

In an Instagram post in May 2025, Mipso announced that they would take an "indfefinite hiatus" after two final shows at the Cat's Cradle on October 8th and 9th, 2025.

== Meaning of Name ==
Over the years the group has claimed various origins of the word "Mipso." In 2013 guitarist Joseph Terrell stated that the members "just came up with it." In 2013 bassist Wood Robinson claimed that the name referred to a now defunct Japanese appliance manufacturer, crediting Jacob Sharp's thesis research into post-war Japan with unearthing a reference to the company. Sharp confirmed this version of the story in an interview with Bluegrass Today. In a September 2015 interview with Raleigh's News & Observer, however, Terrell revealed a new origin story, claiming to want to dispel previous rumors. "There's a phrase in Japan," he explains, "it means something familiar, but there's something a little bit off. And it roughly translates, or at least we were told, to 'a little pee in the miso.' And so we put a little P in the miso: Mipso." This story has subsequently been published and re-confirmed in various publications.

== Discography ==
=== Full albums ===
Album title	Release Date	Peak chart positions		
Album title	Release Date	US Bluegrass	US Folk	Heatseekers
Dark Holler Pop	October 26, 2013	8	–	–
Old Time Reverie	October 2, 2015	1	20	22
Coming Down the Mountain	April 7, 2017	3	–	–
Edges Run	April 6, 2018	1	–	–
Mipso	October 16, 2020	–	–	–
Book of Fools	August 25, 2023	–	–	–

=== EPs ===
Title	Release
Faces	Release date: 2015; Label: Robust Records
Edges Re-Run	Release date: 2019; Label: Antifragile

=== Singles ===
Title	Release
Coming Down the Mountain	2017
Hurt So Good	2017
People Change	2018
Edges Run	2018
Take Your Records Home (D.C. Sessions)	2018
Hourglass	2020
Let a Little Light In	2020
Hey, Coyote	2020
Your Body	2020

=== Videos ===
Title	Release
Hurt So Good	March 2017
People Change (D.C. Sessions)	Sept 2018
Your Body	July 2020
Hey, Coyote	Aug 2020
Let a Little Light In	Sept 2020
Hourglass	Oct 2020
Just Want To Be Loved	Oct 2020
