= Michael Chorney =

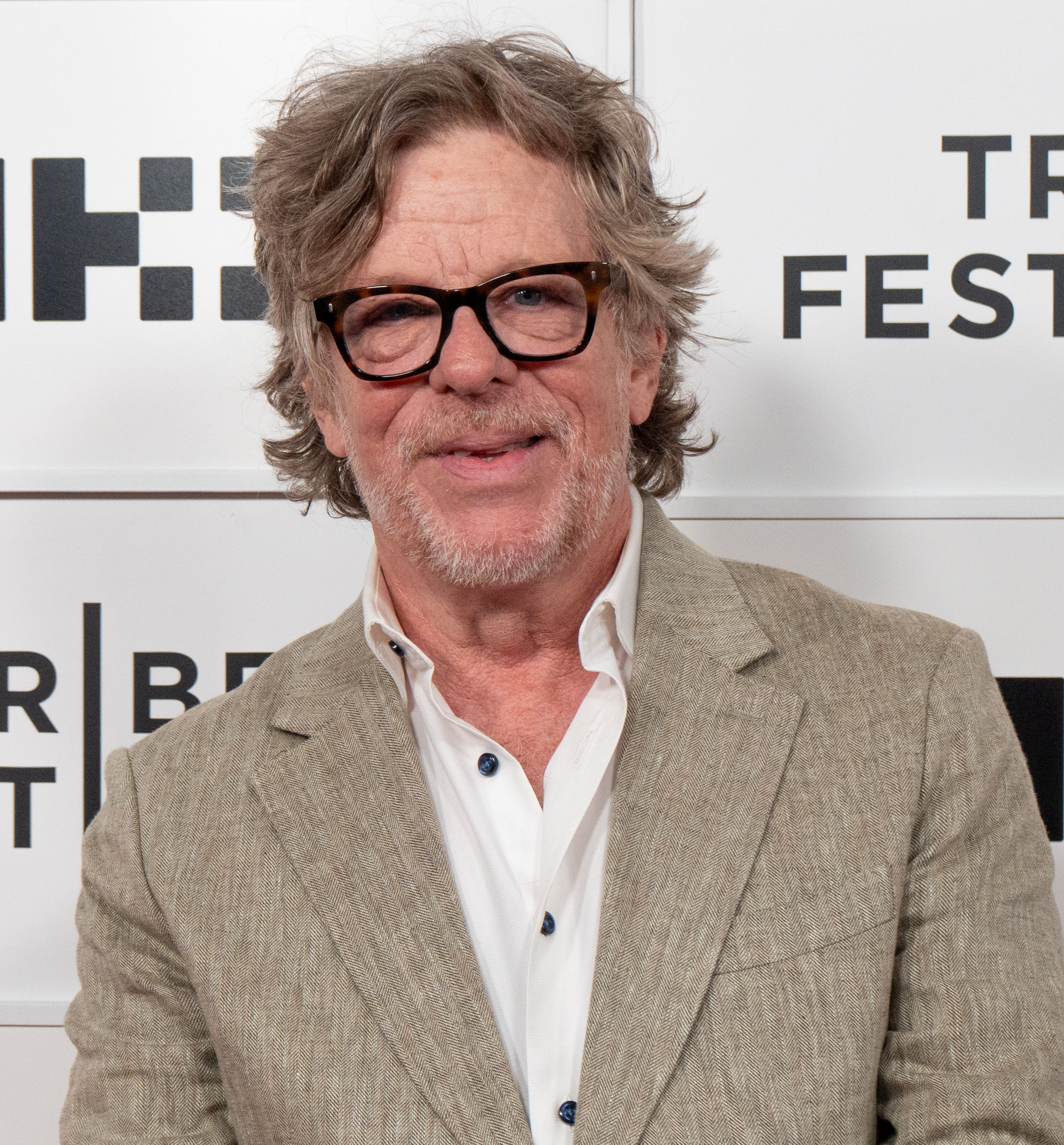
- Chorney in 2026

Background information
- Genres: Jazz, acoustic, alternative
- Occupations: Musician, record producer
- Instruments: Guitar, saxophone
- Years active: 1980–present
- Website: michaelchorney.com

Michael Chorney is an American saxophone and guitar player, composer, arranger, and music producer. His bands include Feast or Famine, So-Called Jazz Quintet, So-Called Jazz Sextet, ViperHouse, Magic City, Orchid, 7 Deadly Sins, the Michael Chorney Sextet, and Hollar General (previously Dollar General).

Chorney produced Anaïs Mitchell's albums Hymns for the Exiled and The Brightness. Mitchell's 2010 folk opera, Hadestown, was the result of a collaboration between Mitchell and Chorney. Chorney's orchestral arrangements featured bassist Todd Sickafoose, Jim Black, Josh Roseman, Tanya Kalmanovich, Marika Hughes, and his own guitar playing. Guests singers included Justin Vernon, Ani DiFranco, Greg Brown, and the Haden Triplets. The Guardian, in their five star review of the Hadestown album, declared Chorney the star of the show for scoring "Mitchell's songs to wondrous effect: the New Orleans jazz of Way Down Hadestown, the grumbling lament of Why We Build the Wall, the sweet and tumbling melody of Wedding Song." Chorney received a Tony Award for Best Orchestrations for his work on Hadestown with Todd Sickafoose after it opened on Broadway in 2019.

Chorney developed a prepared-guitar style that involves manipulating the strings to alter the tone and timbre of the instrument. He is considered to be one of Vermont's most prolific and innovative musicians. His composition “Shabaz" is featured in the documentary Randy Parsons: American Luthier.

== Discography ==
- Vermont Avenue (1993)
- Viperhouse (1995) (with viperHouse)
- Shed (1997) (with viperHouse)
- Ottawa (1997) (with viperHouse)
- Lap Hen (1999) (with viperHouse)
- Tribute to Mingus (1999) (with viperHouse)
- Orchid (2002)
- "Songs and Music of Paul Bowles"
- Hymns for the Exiled (2004)
- Mother Tongue (2006)
- Glossolalia (2007)
- The Brightness (2007)
- Songs in Secret Ink (2008)
- Seth Eames and Michael Chorney – It Disappears (2009)
- Oom Pah of the Ghost Parade (2010)
- Wonder (2010)
- Hadestown (2010)
- Young Man in America (2012)
- Dispensation of the Ordinary (July 2012)
- Adrian Roye & the Exiles "Reclaimed" (July 2013)
- Shameless Light (December 2015)
