= Child Ballads (album) =

Studio album by Anaïs Mitchell and Jefferson Hamer
- Released: February 11, 2013
- Recorded: 2012
- Genres: Folk; Celtic folk
- Length: 39:46
- Label: Wilderland
- Producer: Gary Paczosa

Anaïs Mitchell chronology
| Young Man in America (2012) | Child Ballads (2013) | xoa (2014) |

Jefferson Hamer chronology
| The Murphy Beds (2012) | Child Ballads (2013) | Alameda (2018) |

Child Ballads is a collaborative studio album by American singer-songwriter Anaïs Mitchell and musician Jefferson Hamer, released on February 11, 2013, by Wilderland Records. It serves as Mitchell's sixth studio album and Hamer's second. The album is composed of old folk ballads from the collection of the same name by Francis James Child re-arranged by the duo. They recorded the album with producer Gary Paczosa in early 2012. Child Ballads received generally positive reviews from music critics.

== Background ==
A few years before her previous album, Young Man in America, Mitchell started becoming more interested in traditional music. She ended up purchasing a series of books: the 'Francis J. Child Collection of Ballads', also known as the "Child Ballads", and was inspired by the "beautiful" language and the "pure-heartedness of storytelling" of the songs. The "Child Ballads" was collected by Harvard professor Francis James Child, who gathered more than 300 folk songs from England and Scotland during the late 19th century. They later became a canon in modern folk music, whose artists frequently recorded the songs, which dealt with narratives of witchery, honor, curses, and transformations.

== Recording ==
In 2011, Mitchell mentioned that as well as writing the Young Man record, she was also in the midst of working on a collection of the ballads with friend and frequent collaborator Jefferson Hamer. The duo picked seven of the 305 ballads compiled by Child and recorded the album in early 2012 with Nashville producer Gary Paczosa (known for his work with Alison Krauss and Dolly Parton). Never once putting on headphones while recording, Mitchell describes the album as an "intimate one, featuring a lot of close harmonies and two-acoustic-guitar arrangements".

== Release ==
The album was released by Wilderland Records on February 11, 2013, in the United Kingdom and continental Europe, and on March 19 in the United States and Canada.

The artwork was created by Peter Nevins, who also did the cover art for Mitchell's 2010 album Hadestown. The cover depicts two lovers, embracing one another, with an optical illusion of either head looking over either of the two's shoulders. For the whole album art, Nevins printed one image for each of the seven songs.

== Critical reception ==
Professional ratings
Aggregate scores
| Source | Rating |
|---|---|
| AnyDecentMusic? | 7.3/10 |
Review scores
| Source | Rating |
| AllMusic | 3.5/5 stars |
| The Guardian | 2/5 stars |
| The Independent | 4/5 stars |
| MSN Music (Expert Witness) | B+ |
| The Observer | 4/5 stars |
| Pitchfork | 7/10 |
| PopMatters | 8/10 |
| Uncut | 8/10 |

Child Ballads received generally positive reviews from music critics. At Metacritic, which assigns a normalized rating out of 100 to reviews from mainstream critics, the album received an average score of 79, based on 12 reviews. Nick Coleman of The Independent called it "absolutely beautiful" and wrote that the ballads have rarely sounded this "fresh", because of exceptional playing, vibrant singing, and adorned arrangements. In his review for the newspaper, Andy Gill called it "a deeply satisfying album, steeped in mystery and enchantment." Neil Spencer of The Observer said that the album is a successful addition to the canon of Child-derived modern folk because of how its "transatlantic" sound contemporizes outdated language. Pitchfork's Rachael Maddux believed that Mitchell and Hamer successfully reclaim the flatly written ballads by imbuing an unusual compassion and adding dimension to their characters.

In his review for MSN Music, Robert Christgau wrote that the acoustic guitars are livened up by other instrumentation, while Mitchell and Hamer's vocals avoid both purism and modernizing flair, although the presentation of the songs is not interesting enough to sustain focus on their plots. In a less enthusiastic review, Jude Rogers of The Guardian felt that the album is more concerned with musical aesthetics than enduring material, as the originally raw ballads lose their immediacy to attractive and overproduced harmonies, singing, and guitar playing.

== Track listing ==
All songs are traditional compositions arranged by Anaïs Mitchell and Jefferson Hamer.

1. "Willie of Winsbury" (Child 100) – 5:52
2. "Willie's Lady" (Child 6) – 6:19
3. "Sir Patrick Spens" (Child 58) – 6:43
4. "Riddles Wisely Expounded" (Child 1) – 4:42
5. "Clyde Water" (Child 216) – 5:51
6. "Geordie" (Child 209) – 3:33
7. "Tam Lin" (Child 39) – 6:46

== Personnel ==
Credits are adapted from Allmusic.

- Brandon Bell – engineer
- Eric Boulanger – mastering
- Brittany Haas – fiddle
- Jefferson Hamer – arranger, guitar, vocals
- Viktor Krauss – bass
- Tim Lauer – accordion, pump organ
- Anaïs Mitchell – arranger, guitar, vocals
- Peter Nevins – design, illustrations
- Gary Paczosa – engineer, mixing, producer
- Liz Riches – management
- Jay Sansone – photography
