= Bridges Not Walls =

2017 EP by Billy Bragg

EP by Billy Bragg
- Released: 3 November 2017
- Recorded: May; August 2017
- Studio: Street-Level Studios III, London
- Genre: Country folk, Americana, alternative rock, music hall
- Length: 22:47
- Label: Cooking Vinyl
- Producer: Grant Showbiz; Tom Pritchard (mix engineer)

Billy Bragg chronology
Shine a Light (2013)	Bridges Not Walls (2017)	The Million Things That Never Happened (2021)

Professional ratings
Aggregate scores
Source	Rating
Metacritic	71/100
Review scores
Source	Rating
AllMusic	3.5/5 stars
The Guardian	4/5 stars
Clash	7/10 stars
Record Collector	4/5 stars

Bridges Not Walls is an extended play by singer-songwriter Billy Bragg, compiling six songs released as downloads as a physical CD in 2017. It was released as a Mini-LP on 3 November 2017, and includes the new song "Full English Brexit". It was described in Record Collector as "a solid gold illustration of an always inspiring singer-songwriter finding inspiration in the actions of others".

== Track listing ==
All tracks composed by Billy Bragg, with the exception of track 3 which was written by Anaïs Mitchell and appeared on her album Hadestown.

No.	Title	Length
1.	"The Sleep of Reason"	4:32
2.	"King Tide and the Sunny Day Flood"	2:58
3.	"Why We Build the Wall"	3:29
4.	"Saffiyah Smiles"	3:32
5.	"Not Everything That Counts Can be Counted"	4:13
6.	"Full English Brexit"	4:03
Total length:		22:47

== Personnel ==
- Billy Bragg – vocals, electric guitar, acoustic guitar, bass
- CJ Hillman – electric guitar, pedal steel, mandolin, backing vocals
- Simon Edwards – double bass, backing vocals
- Jacob Stoney – piano, organ, Mellotron, keyboards, backing vocals
- Fred Claridge – drums, backing vocals, cajon
- Judith Goodman – Mellotron
- May Fitzpatrick – backing vocals
- Dave Ross – drums
