= Damon Daunno =

American actor (born 1984)

- Born: November 28, 1984 (age 41); Newark, New Jersey, U.S.
- Education: New York University (BFA)
- Occupations: Actor; composer; musician; singer
- Years active: 2006–present
- Spouse: Kirsty Woodward (2018-2025)

Damon Daunno (born November 28, 1984) is a Tony and Grammy-nominated American actor, singer, musician, and composer. He is best known for his work on Broadway and for the role of Curly McLain in the 2019 revival of musical Oklahoma! for which he received a Tony nomination for Best Actor in a Musical as well as a Grammy nomination for Best Musical Theater Album.

== Early life and education ==
Daunno was born in Newark, New Jersey and raised in Glen Ridge, New Jersey. He attended Glen Ridge High School for one year before transferring to the Loomis Chaffee School in Windsor, Connecticut.

He graduated from Loomis Chaffee School and then studied at New York University Tisch School of the Arts, earning a BFA in drama in 2006.

== Career ==
On October 18, 2010, Daunno released his debut 3-song EP of original music called "Adulterated Trappings". He lists Jeff Buckley and Radiohead to be among his musical influences.

In March 2011, Daunno performed a tribute concert for Jeff Buckley at New York's Knitting Factory. Around this time was when he also had a performance residency at Niagara NYC.

Daunno originated the role of Orpheus in Hadestown in the off-Broadway production which ran from May 6 to July 31, 2016, at New York Theatre Workshop. He appears on the Off Broadway Original Cast Recording.

Daunno starred in the 2019 Broadway revival of Oklahoma! as Curly, for which he received a nomination for the 2019 Tony Award for Best Actor in a Musical.

In August 2020, Daunno was featured on the soundtrack Broadway Sings Blood Rock: The Musical with Andy Mientus, Jennifer DiNoia, and Robert Torti.

== Personal life ==
Daunno previously dated actress Betty Gilpin while both were attending Loomis Chaffee School.

Daunno met British actress Kirsty Woodward in 2014 while performing at the Kneehigh Theatre Company. The two married in 2018 in Brooklyn, New York. In 2025, they divorced.

== Theatre credits ==
| Year | Title | Role | Venue |
|---|---|---|---|
| 2010 | The Last Goodbye | Romeo | Williamstown Theatre Festival |
| 2010–2011 | Brief Encounter | Ensemble, Bill | Studio 54, Broadway |
| 2012 | Pippin | Pippin | American Repertory Theater |
| 2013 | Fly By Night | Harold McClam | Dallas Theater Center |
| 2015 | Oklahoma! | Curly McLain | Bard SummerScape |
| 2015 | These Paper Bullets! | Claude | Gil Cates Theater |
| 2016 | Hadestown | Orpheus | New York Theatre Workshop, Off-Broadway |
| 2017 | Beardo | Beardo | St. John's Lutheran Church |
| 2017 | The Tin Drum | Jan | Shoreditch Town Hall |
| 2018 | The Lucky Ones | Kai | Connelly Theater |
| 2019–2020 | Oklahoma! | Curly McLain | St. Ann's Warehouse |
| 2019–2020 | Oklahoma! | Curly McLain | Circle in the Square Theatre, Broadway |
| 2023 | Almost Famous | Jeff Bebe | Eugene O'Neill Theater Center |
| 2024 | The Lonely Few | Dylan | Newman Mills Theater, Off-Broadway |
| 2025 | The Counterfeit Opera | Macheath | The Amph at Little Island |

== Filmography ==
| Year | Title | Role | Notes |
|---|---|---|---|
| 2013 | The Following | Steve | Episode: "Love Hurts" |
| 2020 | Blue Bloods | Mancuso | Episode: "Where the Truth Lies" |
| 2021 | The Hating Game | Danny | |
| 2022 | The Marvelous Mrs. Maisel | J.J. | Episode: "Everything is Bellmore" |
| 2022, 2026 | Interview with the Vampire | Bruce | Episode: "A Vile Hunger for Your Hammering Heart", Episode: "Toronto" |

== Awards and nominations ==
| Year | Award | Category | Work | Result | Ref. |
|---|---|---|---|---|---|
| 2018 | Drama Desk Award | Outstanding Featured Actor in a Musical | The Lucky Ones | Nominated | |
| 2018 | Lucille Lortel Award | Outstanding Lead Actor in a Musical | The Lucky Ones | Won | |
| 2019 | Tony Award | Best Actor in a Musical | Oklahoma! | Nominated | |
| 2019 | Drama Desk Award | Outstanding Actor in a Musical | Oklahoma! | Nominated | |
| 2019 | Outer Critics Circle Award | Outstanding Actor in a Musical | Oklahoma! | Nominated | |
| 2020 | Grammy Award | Best Musical Theater Album | Oklahoma! | Nominated | |
