= Anaïs Mitchell (album) =

Studio album by Anaïs Mitchell
- Released: January 28, 2022
- Studio: Dreamland (Hurley, New York)
- Genres: Folk; indie folk; chamber folk
- Length: 32:03
- Label: BMG
- Producer: Josh Kaufman

Anaïs Mitchell chronology
Xoa (2014)	Anaïs Mitchell (2022)

Singles from Anaïs Mitchell
- 1. "Bright Star" Released: October 27, 2021; 2. "Brooklyn Bridge" Released: December 2, 2021; 3. "On Your Way (Felix Song)" Released: January 12, 2022

Professional ratings
Aggregate scores
Source	Rating
Metacritic	83/100
Review scores
Source	Rating
The Guardian	4/5 stars
Evening Standard	4/5 stars
The Line of Best Fit	8/10
Mojo	4/5 stars
No Ripcord	7/10
Paste	7.9/10
Pitchfork	7.2/10
The Sydney Morning Herald	4/5 stars
The Telegraph	5/5 stars
Uncut	8/10

Anaïs Mitchell is the eighth studio album by American singer-songwriter Anaïs Mitchell, released on January 28, 2022, through BMG Rights Management, her first release on the label. The album features musical contributions from Michael Lewis, JT Bates, Thomas Bartlett, Aaron Dessner and Nico Muhly.

== Promotion ==
"Bright Star" was released as the album's first single on October 28, 2021. It is an indie folk song "about looking back on years of restless pursuit and making peace with the source of that longing: the Muse, the Great Unknown, the One That Got Away – those things that motivate us that we never can touch." It impacted adult alternative radio on January 10, 2022.

Album opener "Brooklyn Bridge" was released as the second single from the album on December 2, 2021. Of the song, Mitchell said "Having left New York, I was able to write a love letter to it in a way I never could when I was living there. It was like, fuck it. This is how I feel. There is nothing more beautiful than riding over one of the New York bridges at night next to someone who inspires you."

"On Your Way (Felix Song)" was released as the third single on January 12, 2022. Dedicated to the late Felix McTeigue, Mitchell said of him "We briefly had the same manager in our early 'hustling days' of trying to get a songwriter career going. I can picture us playing at the old Living Room on the lower east side, and me being one of five people in Felix's audience, and vice versa. Felix was really fearless and present, he always had a guitar on his back, he was always writing something, he loved the act of just rushing headlong into writing, recording, not overthinking it. It's a lesson I'll return to for the rest of my life."

Mitchell toured the album across the United States and Europe in 2022, with her band Bonny Light Horseman joining her for some American dates.

== Track listing ==
All tracks are written by Anaïs Mitchell.

Anaïs Mitchell track listing
No.	Title	Length
1.	"Brooklyn Bridge"	4:18
2.	"Bright Star"	3:10
3.	"Revenant"	3:30
4.	"On Your Way (Felix Song)"	2:53
5.	"Real World"	1:49
6.	"Backroads"	3:26
7.	"Little Big Girl"	3:18
8.	"Now You Know"	3:14
9.	"The Words"	3:11
10.	"Watershed"	3:14
Total length:		32:03

Deluxe version bonus tracks
No.	Title	Length
11.	"Morning Glory"	2:22
12.	"Any Way You Come"	3:26
Total length:		37:51

== Personnel ==
Musicians

- Anaïs Mitchell – vocals (all tracks), acoustic guitar (2–4, 7–9)
- Michael Lewis – bass (1, 2, 4–8, 10), saxophone (1, 2, 4, 6, 10), tenor saxophone (3), clarinet (6), synthesizer (10)
- JT Bates – drums, percussion (1–8, 10)
- Josh Kaufman – electric guitar (1–8), synthesizer (1, 10), bass (3), piano (3, 9), mandolin (4, 6) organ (6, 10), harmonica (8), 12-string guitar (10), synth bass (10)
- Aaron Dessner – electric guitar (1, 2, 4, 10)
- Nico Muhly – ensemble, string arrangement (1); arrangement (6, 9, 10)
- Thomas Bartlett – piano (1, 2, 4–8, 10), synthesizer (1–4, 9, 10), Wurlitzer (2, 3, 8, 9), Rhodes piano (4), Mellotron (6), organ (7)
- Nadia Sirota – viola (1, 9, 10)
- Nathan Schram – violin (1, 9, 10)
- Alex Sopp – flute (6)

Technical

- Josh Kaufman – production
- Greg Calbi – mastering
- Steve Fallone – mastering
- D. James Goodwin – mixing
- Bella Blasko – engineering

== Charts ==
Chart performance for Anaïs Mitchell
Chart (2022)	Peak position
Scottish Albums (Official Charts)	37
UK Album Downloads (Official Charts)	30
UK Independent Albums (Official Charts)	10
