= Lana Gordon =

American singer

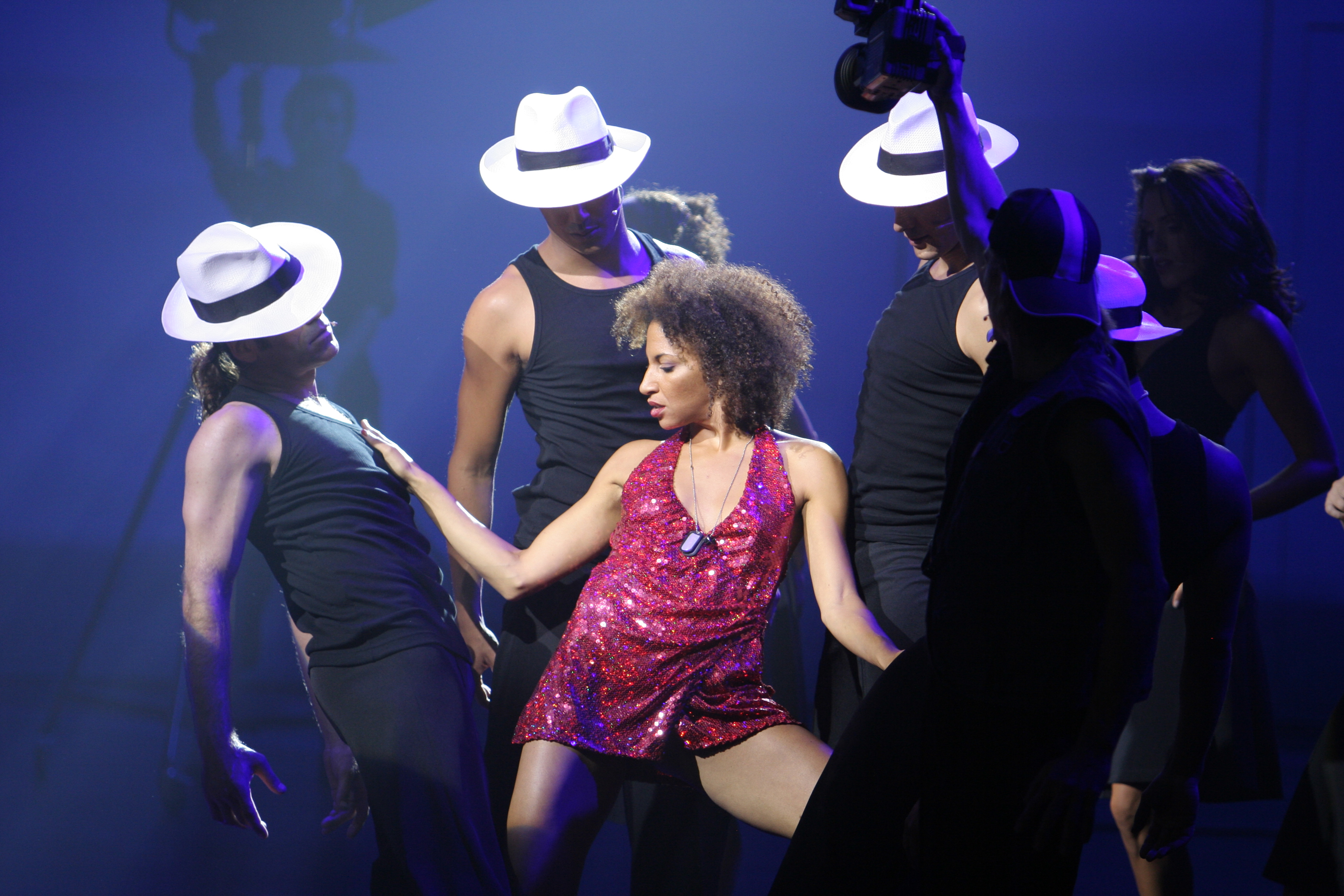
- Gordon in 2006

Lana Jean Gordon is an American singer, actress and model, best known for her appearances in Broadway and theatre productions.

== Early life and education ==
Gordon was born in New London, Connecticut. In 1989, she studied dance at New York City's Alvin Ailey School on a scholarship. She subsequently took part in a repertory ensemble directed by Sylvia Walters for over 3 years, before joining Donald Bird's ensemble The/Group. In the summer of 1994, she worked for 3 months in Yokkaichi, Japan as a soloist at a prestigious restaurant and lounge where she performed popular standards and show tunes to the region's upper-class clientele. Later in the same year, Gordon played the role of Dionne in the European tour of the musical Hair.

In 1997, Gordon debuted on Broadway as an ensemble cast member in The Lion King, a role she played for two and a half years, one of her roles was a cheetah. Following this, she joined the cast of Broadway musical Jesus Christ Superstar. After Jesus Christ Superstar, she was asked to return to The Lion King to play the role of Shenzi. In 2003 she took on the role of Anita in West Side Story, and toured Europe numerous of times over her five years in the role. In 2020-2021 Gordon voiced the role of the Oracle in the sci-fi musical audio series, The World to Come. She recently launched a solo singing career in Europe.

Gordon has also worked as a model in America, both in print and TV advertising.

== Musicals ==
=== Broadway ===
- 2022 and 2024: Hadestown (Persephone)
- 2021: Hadestown (Persephone (at some performances))
- 2017, 2018, 2019 and 2022-2023: Chicago (Velma Kelly)
- 1997–2001: The Lion King (Shenzi/Ensemble and understudy Nala) - Original Broadway cast
- 2000: Jesus Christ Superstar (Ensemble)

=== Theatre ===
- 1993: The Minstrel Show
- 1995: Hair (European Tour)
- 1995: Tommy
- 1996: Beggars Holiday
- 1997: Odysseus
- 1990: Stepping Out
- 2003–2005: West Side Story (European & Asian Tour)
- 2005: Chicago
- 2007: Carmen Cubana
- 2007–2008: West Side Story (European Tour)
- 2009: Tarzan
- 2014: Chicago (Stuttgart Production)
- 2019: Chicago

=== Productions ===
- 1997: The Lion King: Original Broadway Cast Recording (Album)
- 2006: Carmen Cubana (Album)
- 2006: "Garden of Love" (Single)
- 2007: "Hold On (That Piano Track)" (Single)
- 2007: "Can We Live" (Single)
- 2008: "Angels" (Single)
- 2008: "Miracle Within" (Single)
- 2008: "Because Time" (Single)
- 2008: "Missing" (Single)
- 2009: "Yes!" (Single, Western Union campaign song)
- 2009: "Child in Time" (Single, Alternative Hair Song)
