= Todd Sickafoose =

American jazz and rock musician, composer, and producer

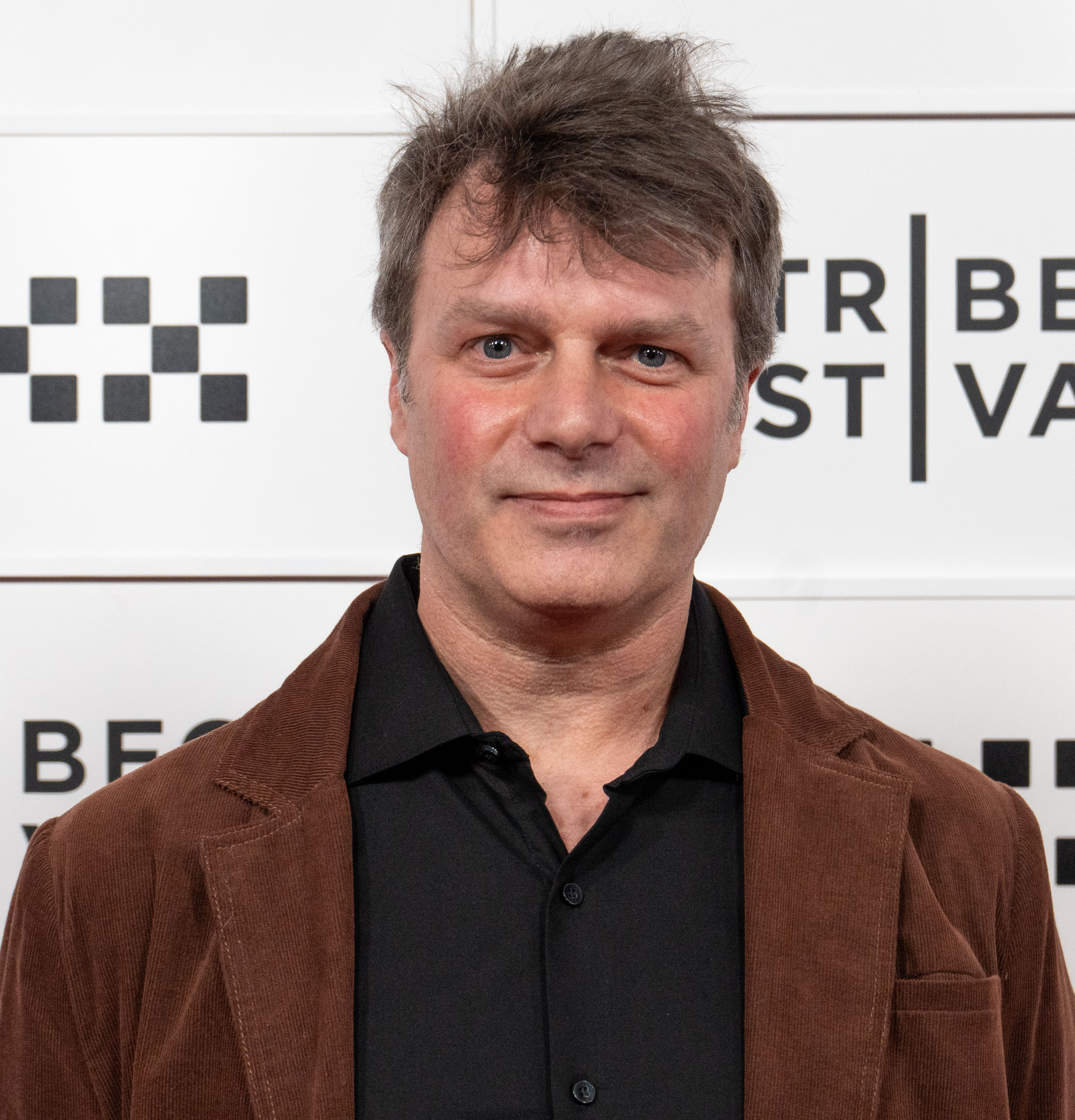
- Sickafoose in 2026

Background information
- Born: 1974 (age 51–52); San Francisco, California, U.S.
- Genres: Jazz, avant-garde jazz, folk, rock
- Occupations: Musician, Composer, Producer
- Instruments: Bass, Keyboards
- Years active: 1990s–present
- Labels: Cryptogramophone, Righteous Babe Records
- Website: www.toddsickafoose.com

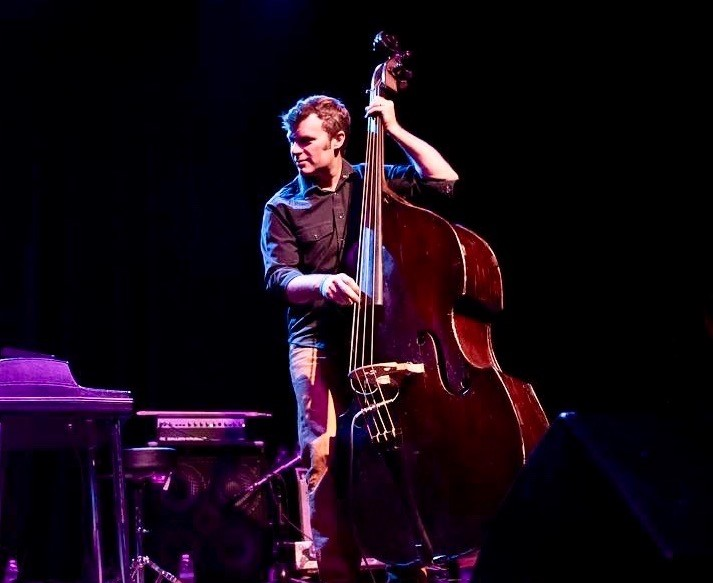
Todd Sickafoose at The Fillmore in San Francisco

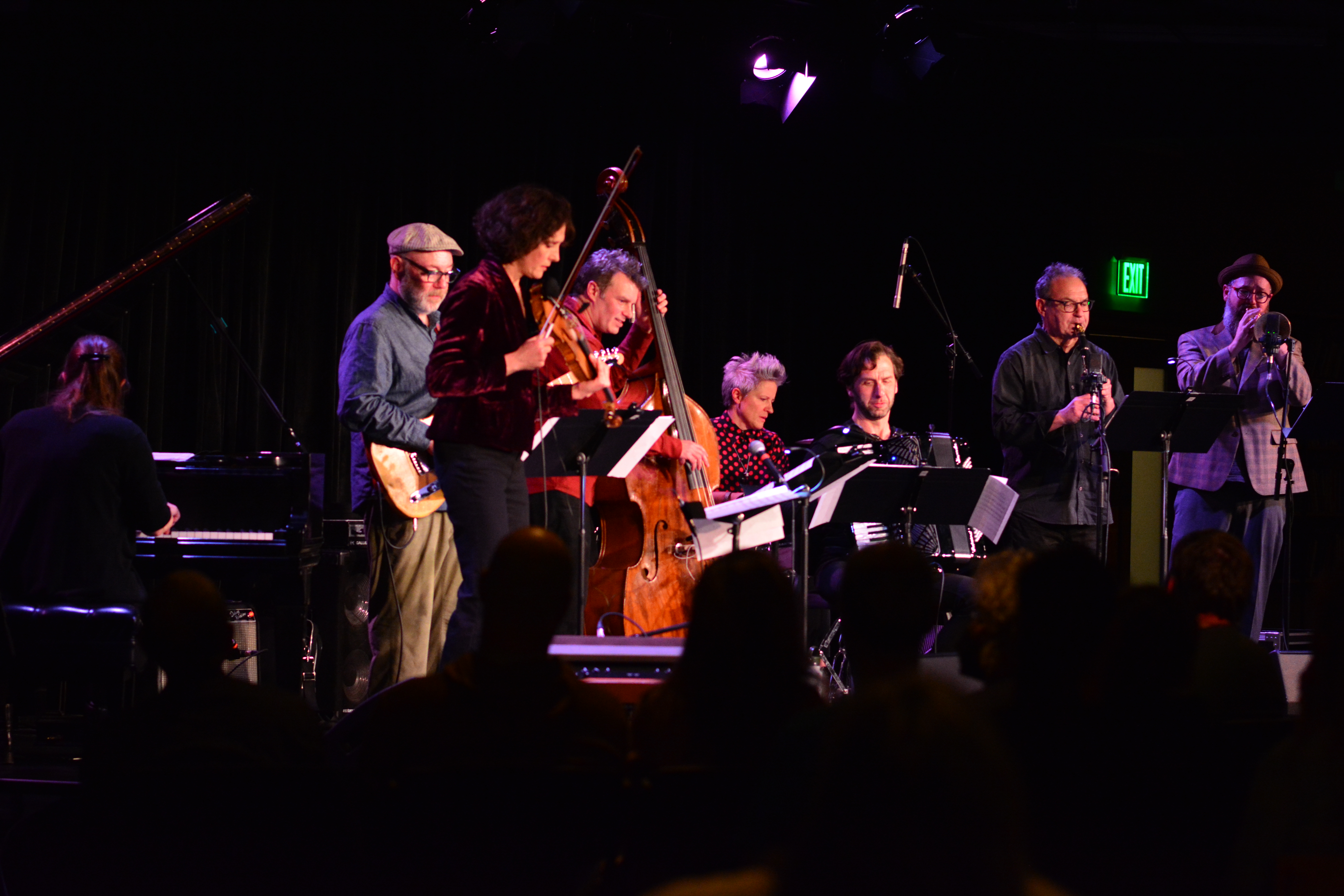
Todd Sickafoose's Bear Proof, downstairs at Town Hall, Seattle, Washington, at the 2023 Earshot Jazz Festival. Left to right: Carmen Staaf (piano, seen from the back), Adam Levy (guitar), Jenny Scheinman (violin), Todd Sickafoose (bass), Allison Miller (drums), Rob Reich (accordion), Ben Goldberg (clarinet), Kirk Knuffke (cornet).

Todd Sickafoose is an American jazz and rock musician, composer, and producer/engineer from San Francisco, California.

He is best known for playing acoustic bass and keyboards with Ani DiFranco but has also led his own group, Todd Sickafoose's Tiny Resistors.

Sickafoose has been a member of the bands of Jenny Scheinman, Scott Amendola, Adam Levy, Allison Miller, and Noe Venable. He has performed and recorded with Don Byron, Trey Anastasio, Nels Cline, Ron Miles, Myra Melford, Skerik, Stanton Moore, Bobby Previte, Will Bernard, Steven Bernstein, Jessica Lurie, Erin McKeown, Sean Hayes, Carla Bozulich, Etienne de Rocher, Shane Endsley, Tony Furtado, Darol Anger, Andrew Bird, Art Hirahara, and John Zorn.

Sickafoose has produced three albums for Anaïs Mitchell – Hadestown (2010), Young Man in America (2012), and Hadestown Live Original Cast Recording (2017). He arranged and orchestrated Hadestown, along with Michael Chorney, for productions at New York Theatre Workshop, Citadel Theatre in Edmonton, Alberta, the National Theatre in London, and the Walter Kerr Theatre on Broadway. He has also produced albums for Rupa & the April Fishes, Nels Andrews, and Mipso. Sickafoose, along with Michael Chorney, received Tony Awards for Best Orchestrations after Hadestown opened on Broadway in 2019. Sickafoose also won a Grammy award as a co-producer of the Hadestown cast recording, which won Best Musical Theater Album in 2020. Sickafoose has also composed original music for the fourth season of the Peabody award winning podcast Threshold Podcast

At the age of 13 Sickafoose began playing double bass after seeing Edgar Meyer perform. He later studied with Charlie Haden and then with Mel Powell at California Institute of the Arts. He moved to Brooklyn, New York's vibrant music scene, joining many musical friends that were residing there. Sickafoose began playing with Ani DiFranco in 2004 after opening for her on tour.

Critic Steve Greenlee of JazzTimes states Sickafoose's 2008 release Tiny Resistors is one of that "year’s most compelling listens." The CD also received positive reviews from NY Times and USA Today.

== Discography ==
- Dogs Outside (Evander, 2000)
- Blood Orange (Secret Hatch, 2006)
- Tiny Resistors (Cryptogramophone, 2008)
- Bear Proof (Secret Hatch, 2023)
