= The Song They Sang... When Rome Fell =

Studio album by Anaïs Mitchell
- Released: 2002
- Genres: Folk, Indie folk

Anaïs Mitchell chronology
The Song They Sang... When Rome Fell (2002)	Hymns for the Exiled (2004)

The Song They Sang... When Rome Fell is the 2002 debut release by Vermont-based American singer-songwriter Anaïs Mitchell. The album was made during the singer's 6-month stay in Austin, Texas, and was recorded in a single afternoon. It consists of Mitchell playing her acoustic guitar and singing with sparse production. The record is currently out of print and is not referenced among the rest of Mitchell's albums on her site's discography section.

== Track listing ==
1. The Calling
2. Parking Lot Nudie Bar
3. Make It Up
4. Hymn For The Exiled
5. Work Makes Free
6. Deliberately
7. The Routine
8. Orleanna
9. The Song They Sang When Rome Fell
10. Hold This
11. Go Fuck Yourself
