= Threshold Podcast =

Environmental podcast

Threshold is a podcast and radio show that tackles one pressing environmental story each season. The podcast explores the intersections of environment, history, culture, science, politics and social justice, focusing on the human relationships with the natural world.

As of July 2026, Threshold has released five full seasons, plus an interview-based podcast series called Threshold Conversations and a special series called The Corridor. Executive producer and host of Threshold, Amy Martin, had a 2016 Scripps Fellowship in Environmental Journalism at the University of Colorado, Boulder.

== Format ==
Threshold is a serial, season-based show. Each season, Threshold tackles one pressing environmental issue, exploring it from several angles and perspectives.

Threshold Seasons one two and three together with currently released episodes of Threshold Conversations features original music created by Travis Yost. Music for season four and five has been composed by Todd Sickafoose.

Episodes vary in length from 30 to 60 minutes. Versions of the episodes formatted to the public radio time slots are available for license by radio stations on the Public Radio Exchange, PRX.

== Seasons ==
=== Season 1 ===
Season one "Oh, Give Me a Home" explores the history of the American bison, the United States' national mammal. Hundreds of years ago, over 50 million bison roamed the lands of the United States freely. By 1901, only 23 wild bison were left inside Yellowstone National Park. Reporting from across Montana and interviewing ranchers, tribal members, scientists, and many others, the season asks: Can we ever live with wild, free-roaming bison again?

=== Season 2 ===
Season two "Cold Comfort" focuses on how the Arctic is changing due to climate change, and why that matters. The focus is on the four million people live in the Arctic, and they've been dealing with the effects of climate change for decades.

=== Season 3 ===
Season three "The Refuge" focuses on oil drilling in the Alaska's Arctic National Wildlife Refuge. In 2017, Congress opened part of the refuge for oil and gas development. But a number of communities, including indigenous communities, such as Iñupiat and the Gwich'in, in the region, oppose the drilling.

=== Season 4 ===
Season four "Time to 1.5" focuses on the climate goal of 1.5 °C over pre-industrial levels. Will we be able to prevent warming beyond 1.5 °C is the question. .

Season 5

Season five "Hark" focuses on the sounds of the natural world. The season will take the listeners from subarctic lakes in northern Sweden to reefs in Australia. The season encourage listeners to pay attention to the nonhuman sounds and communications that takes place around us. The first episode of the season was released on November 19th 2024.

=== Threshold Conversations ===
Threshold Conversations is a spinoff show featuring interviews with environmental thought leaders on important issues impacting cultures, communities, and ecosystems in the United States and beyond. This series aims to create space for thoughtful, civil dialogue about the urgent environmental issues we're living with today.

=== The Corridor ===
The Corridor is a special 7-episode series exploring how Louisiana's historical roots with sugar plantations and slave labor gave rise to its fossil fuel and petrochemical industries, and how residents are now confronting and dealing with the environmental justice impacts of these industries. This series is hosted by Jaha Naila Avery, and its first episode released on June 2, 2026.

== Awards and reception ==
Threshold has received several prestigious awards, including a Peabody Award and a national Edward R. Murrow Award, as well as awards from the Society of Professional Journalists, the Montana Broadcasters Association, a citation from the Overseas Press Club, and more. Threshold has also been included in best-of lists by Outside Online, High Country News, Bello Collective, and The Philadelphia Inquirer.

The Peabody Jurors wrote of Threshold Season 3: "The Refuge is an outstanding example of environmental journalism."

Holly Kirkpatrick of Rise Collaborative wrote that Threshold Season 2 helps listeners gain a more in-depth understanding of the Arctic. "In most of the 1–4 minute news and radio reports about the Arctic or climate change, we don't always hear enough from the four million people actually living there. Threshold aims to change that by exploring the complexities of the Arctic through the stories of its residents," Kirkpatrick writes.

Dan DeLuca of The Philly Inquirer wrote that Threshold Season 1: "an immersive exploration of the nation's history with the [bison]...It digs deep into issues about conservation and politics and the relationship of the U.S. government to native populations both animal and human, while never losing a sense of wonder about the majestic beasts."

== Syndication ==
Threshold has been broadcast on public radio stations across the country, including WHYY Philadelphia, KUT Austin, KJZZ Phoenix, and more.

== Funding ==
Threshold is produced by Auricle Productions, an independent, non-profit journalism organization. Threshold's work is supported by the Pulitzer Center, International Women's Media Foundation's Howard G. Buffett Fund for Women Journalists, Montana Public Radio, Park Foundation, High Stakes Foundation, and Threshold's listeners.
