= Country (EP) =

Country E.P.

EP by Anaïs Mitchell and Rachel Ries
- Released: September 2, 2008
- Recorded: 2008
- Genre: Country Folk
- Length: 18:22
- Label: Righteous Babe
- Producer: Jason Ward

Anaïs Mitchell chronology
The Brightness (2007)	Country E.P. (2008)	Hadestown (2010)

Rachel Ries chronology
Without a Bird (2007)	Country E.P. (2008)	Ghost of a Gardener (2014)

Country E.P. is a collaborative effort by Vermont-based folk artist Anaïs Mitchell and Chicago-based Rachel Ries. It is both artists' first extended play. The five-track E.P. was released on September 2, 2008 on CD with three of these tracks released on 7” vinyl. The 7” vinyl was only available from Righteous Babe Records' online store.

== Track listing ==
1. "O My Star!" – 3:03
2. "Mgd" – 3:19
3. "Come September" – 3:07
4. "Grace the Day" – 4:37
5. "When You Fall" – 4:19

== Personnel ==
- Anaïs Mitchell & Rachel Ries - guitar and vocals
- Billy Beard - drums
- Kimon Kirk - bass
- Dan Abu-Absi - mandolin
- Drew Lindsay - accordion
- Jesse Graber - violin
- John Hasbrouck - dobro on "Grace the Day"
- Mike Grigoni - dobro and pedal steel on "O My Star!" and "Come September"
