= The Brightness =

Studio album by Anaïs Mitchell
- Released: February 13, 2007
- Genre: Folk; indie folk
- Length: 39:34
- Label: Righteous Babe Records
- Producer: Michael Chorney

Anaïs Mitchell chronology
Hymns for the Exiled (2004)	The Brightness (2007)	Country E.P. (2008)

Professional ratings
Review scores
Source	Rating
AllMusic	3.5/5 stars
Folkwax	(7/10)
PopMatters	(6/10)

The Brightness is the third studio album by American folksinger Anaïs Mitchell, released February 13, 2007, on Righteous Babe Records. It was recorded at The Bristmill in Bristol, Vermont and produced by Michael Chorney. In December 2012, the song 'Of a Friday Night' was played as the Weather on episode 12 of Welcome to Night Vale, "The Candidate", but was mislabeled as 'The Brightness'. "Hades and Persephone" was included in Mitchell's musical Hadestown, based on her studio album of the same name and retitled "How Long?"

== Track listing ==
All tracks written by Anaïs Mitchell.

1. "Your Fonder Heart" – 3:31
2. "Of a Friday Night" – 4:11
3. "Namesake" – 3:00
4. "Shenandoah" – 4:03
5. "Changer" – 2:51
6. "Song of the Magi" – 3:00
7. "Santa Fe Dream" – 3:59
8. "Hobo's Lullaby" – 3:09
9. "Old-Fashioned Hat" – 3:59
10. "Hades & Persephone" – 3:22
11. "Out of Pawn" – 4:29
