= Hadestown =

Musical by Anaïs Mitchell

- Broadway promotional poster.
- Music: Anaïs Mitchell
- Lyrics: Anaïs Mitchell
- Book: Anaïs Mitchell
- Basis: Orpheus and Eurydice and Hades and Persephone
- Productions: 2016 off-Broadway; 2018 London; 2019 Broadway; 2021 North American tour 2024 West End
- Awards: Tony Award for Best Musical; Tony Award for Best Original Score

Hadestown is a musical with music, lyrics, and book by Anaïs Mitchell. It blends versions of two ancient Greek myths, Orpheus and Eurydice and Hades and Persephone, to explore enduring and contemporary themes such as poverty and love.

The original sung-through version of the musical was performed in Barre and Vergennes, Vermont, in 2006, followed by a tour in Vermont and Massachusetts in 2007. Mitchell, unsure about the future of the musical, turned it into a concept album, released in 2010.

In 2012, Mitchell met Rachel Chavkin, and the two reworked the stage version, with additional songs and dialogue. The new version of the musical, directed by Chavkin, premiered off-Broadway at New York Theatre Workshop (NYTW) on May 6, 2016, and ran through July 31. Following productions in Edmonton, Alberta, Canada, and London, England, the show premiered on Broadway in 2019. The Broadway production received critical acclaim, and at the 73rd Tony Awards it received 14 nominations (the most that year) and won eight, including Best Musical and Best Original Score. A filmed version was released in 2026, starring five of the original principal Broadway cast members.

== Synopsis ==
=== Act I ===
The Greek god Hermes welcomes the audience to the show, introducing the story, characters, ensemble, and band ("Road to Hell"). Eurydice and the Fates describe Eurydice’s cynical worldview as well as the harsh weather and famine ("Any Way the Wind Blows"). Orpheus, Hermes' ward, introduces himself to Eurydice and abruptly asks her to marry him ("Come Home with Me"). Eurydice is doubtful, as they both live in poverty. Orpheus tells her that he is writing a song to make spring come again, and they will no longer have to endure hardship ("Wedding Song").

Prompted by Hermes, Orpheus tells the story of Hades and Persephone ("Epic I"). Persephone arrives in the world above and celebrates summertime ("Livin' it Up on Top"), while Eurydice begins to fall in love with Orpheus ("All I've Ever Known"). Hades comes early to collect Persephone, who voices her misery at having to return to Hadestown, Hades' underground factory. Despite hearing about the never-ending labor endured by the factory workers, Eurydice is intrigued by the Fates' rich praise of Hadestown, and its promise of protection ("Way Down Hadestown"). The cold weather returns, and Eurydice searches for food and firewood, urging Orpheus to finish his song ("A Gathering Storm"). Orpheus continues working on his song ("Epic II") as Eurydice becomes more desperate as times grow harder.

After Persephone and Hades argue ("Chant"), Hades leaves Hadestown to find someone who will appreciate its safety and security. He comes across a desperate Eurydice, who has become caught in a snowstorm, and invites her to come to Hadestown ("Hey, Little Songbird"), and the Fates urge Eurydice to join him ("When the Chips Are Down"). With the cold surging and an empty stomach, Eurydice sees no other choice except to follow Hades. She bids goodbye to the preoccupied Orpheus and heads to Hadestown; the Fates chastise the audience for judging her for choosing self-interest over love ("Gone, I'm Gone"). Orpheus realizes Eurydice is missing and resolves to rescue her from Hadestown. Using Hermes' instructions, he travels to Hadestown the long way without the use of the train ("Wait for Me"). As Hades revels in his power and dominion over the denizens of his realm ("Why We Build the Wall"), Eurydice arrives in Hadestown and signs a contract to become a worker in Hadestown.

=== Act II ===
Persephone sings to the patrons of a speakeasy that she runs behind Hades's back ("Our Lady of the Underground"). Eurydice begins to recognize the consequences of her choice to go to Hadestown: she will become a forgotten laborer and can never leave unless Hades lets her go ("Way Down Hadestown" (reprise)). Regretting her decision, she begins to forget her life and the world above ("Flowers").

Orpheus arrives in Hadestown and promises Eurydice that he will take her home ("Come Home with Me" (reprise)). Hades tells him that Eurydice willingly signed the contract and orders the workers to attack Orpheus ("Papers"). The Fates tell him to give up hope ("Nothing Changes"). Orpheus vows to find a way to free Eurydice, rallying the workers and catching Persephone's attention in the process ("If It's True").

Persephone is inspired by Orpheus's determination and pleads with Hades to let Eurydice go ("How Long?"). While the workers begin to question the freedom they were promised, Hades challenges Orpheus to sing his completed song, threatening to kill him afterwards ("Chant" (reprise)). Orpheus sings his song, reminding Hades of his love for Persephone ("Epic III"). Hades and Persephone reconcile with a dance ("Epic III ('They Danced...')"), after which Orpheus and Eurydice promise to stay together no matter the difficulty ("Promises"). Orpheus asks Hades if they may leave, and Hades tells him that he has not reached a decision. The Fates taunt Hades for his dilemma: If he kills Orpheus and keeps Eurydice captive, they become martyrs, but if he lets them go, he loses control over his workers as they have begun to agitate for their freedom ("Word to the Wise"). Hades lets Orpheus and Eurydice go on one condition: Orpheus must lead them out single file. If he turns around to confirm that Eurydice is following him, she will return to Hadestown and remain there forever ("His Kiss, the Riot").

Hermes explains the condition to Orpheus and Eurydice, and they begin the long, frightening walk out, as the workers look to them for hope. Persephone and Hades decide to give their own relationship another chance ("Wait for Me" (reprise)). Just as Orpheus reaches the end, he is overcome by doubt and turns around, condemning Eurydice to return to Hadestown ("Doubt Comes In"). Hermes reflects on the somber tale and why it must be told, as the story resets to the beginning, and the company begins to tell it again ("Road to Hell" (reprise)). After the curtain call, the performer playing Persephone leads the cast in honoring Orpheus for his optimism and bravery ("We Raise Our Cups").

== Musical numbers ==
There are 33 songs performed over the two acts:

Act I

- "Road to Hell" – Hermes, Company
- "Any Way the Wind Blows" – Eurydice, The Fates
- "Come Home With Me" – Orpheus, Eurydice, Hermes, Workers
- "Wedding Song" – Orpheus, Eurydice, Workers
- "Epic I" – Orpheus, Hermes
- "Livin' it Up on Top" – Persephone, Hermes, Orpheus, Company
- "All I've Ever Known" – Eurydice, Orpheus
- "Way Down Hadestown" – Company
- "A Gathering Storm" – Hermes, Orpheus, Eurydice, The Fates
- "Epic II" – Orpheus
- "Chant" – Company
- "Hey, Little Songbird" – Hades, Eurydice
- "When the Chips Are Down" – The Fates, Eurydice
- "Gone, I'm Gone" – Eurydice, The Fates
- "Wait for Me" – Hermes, Orpheus, The Fates, Workers
- "Why We Build the Wall" – Hades, Company

Act II

- "Our Lady of the Underground" – Persephone
- "Way Down Hadestown" (reprise) – Hermes, The Fates, Eurydice, Workers
- "Flowers" – Eurydice
- "Come Home With Me" (reprise) – Orpheus, Eurydice
- "Papers" – Hades, Company
- "Nothing Changes" – The Fates
- "If It's True" – Orpheus, Hermes, Workers
- "How Long?" – Persephone, Hades
- "Chant" (reprise) – Company
- "Epic III" – Orpheus, Company
- "Promises" – Eurydice, Orpheus
- "Word to the Wise" – The Fates
- "His Kiss, the Riot" – Hades
- "Wait for Me" (reprise) – Hermes, Company
- "Doubt Comes In" – Orpheus, Eurydice, The Fates, Workers
- "Road to Hell" (reprise) – Hermes, Company
- "We Raise our Cups" – Persephone, Eurydice, Company

== Productions ==
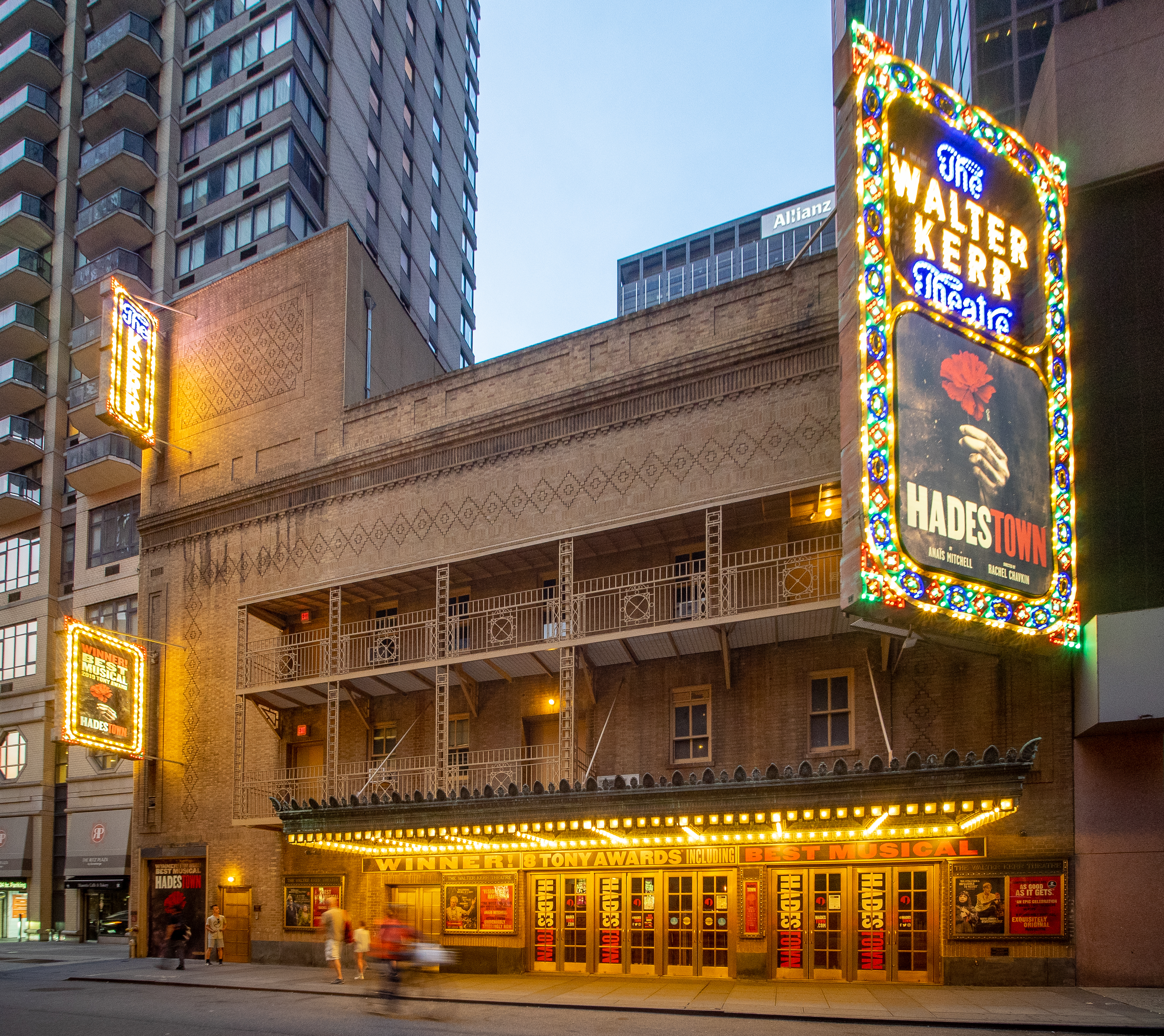
Branding as seen on the Walter Kerr Theatre

=== Early versions (2006–2012) ===
An early version of Hadestown was performed in the cities of Barre and Vergennes, Vermont, in 2006, before going on a seven-day, ten-city tour in Mitchell's home state of Vermont and Massachusetts in 2007. The creative team included director/designer Ben T. Matchstick and orchestrator/arranger Michael Chorney, with a cast drawn from artists in Vermont, including Mitchell as Eurydice and Matchstick as Hermes. Unsure of the future of the stage version, Mitchell released a concept album in 2010.

In November 2012, a reading at Barnard College was directed by Matchstick and starred Damon Daunno as Orpheus, Allison Case as Eurydice, André De Shields as Hermes, Harriett D Foy as Persephone, and Paul Kandel as Hades. The Fates included Krystal Joy Brown, with a men's chorus that included Javier Muñoz. On August 16, 2014, as part of New York Theatre Workshop's (NYTW) Dartmouth College residency, the work-in-progress was staged at the Hopkins Center for the Arts' Bentley Theater, following a two-week developmental workshop. Directed by Rachel Chavkin, the cast included Daunno as Orpheus, Amber Gray as Persephone, Shaina Taub as Eurydice, and Taylor Mac as Hermes.

In October 2015, NYTW gave another performance with Daunno as Orpheus, Nabiyah Be as Eurydice, Taub as a Fate, and Gray as Persephone. Two more workshops were held prior to rehearsals beginning in April 2016 at the NYTW. The last of these introduced orchestrations by Michael Chorney, and Chris Sullivan joined the cast as Hermes.

=== Off-Broadway (2016) ===
After watching a production of Natasha, Pierre & the Great Comet of 1812 directed by Chavkin in 2012, Mitchell discussed with her gaps in the concept album's storyline and began to expand the stage version of the musical. Mitchell wrote an additional 15 songs and added dialogue to clarify the plot and deepen characterization. Todd Sickafoose contributed additional/co-arrangements and orchestrations to Chorney's. Hadestown premiered at New York Theatre Workshop (NYTW), running from May 3, 2016, through July 31. The production starred Daunno as Orpheus, Be as Eurydice, Gray as Persephone, Patrick Page as Hades, Sullivan as Hermes, and Lulu Fall, Jessie Shelton, and Taub as the Fates. On October 14, 2016, an EP was released featuring four songs from the musical, recorded live on June 28 and 29, 2016. A full live album was released on October 6, 2017. The production was featured in the documentary series Working in the Theatre produced by the American Theatre Wing.

The show received a developmental workshop presented by NYTW on March 24, 2017, with Reeve Carney as Orpheus, Gizel Jiménez as Eurydice, Page as Hades, Gray as Persephone, De Shields as Hermes, as well as Yvette González-Nacer and Crystal Lucas-Perry.

=== Canada (2017) ===
Hadestown was presented as a pre-Broadway tryout as part of the 2017/2018 season at Citadel Theatre in Edmonton, Alberta, Canada. Chavkin again directed, with performances from November 11 to December 3, 2017, with Gray and Page reprising their roles from NYTW. The production was presented in collaboration with Mara Isaacs and Dale Franzen, who produced the off-Broadway run. The production also starred Carney as Orpheus, T.V. Carpio as Eurydice, and Kingsley Leggs as Hermes.

=== London (2018) ===
Hadestown was next performed in the Olivier Theatre of the National Theatre in London, running from November 2018 to January 2019. Designers included Rachel Hauck (sets), Michael Krass (costumes), Bradley King (lighting), and Nevin Steinberg and Jessica Paz (sound). David Neumann choreographed. Page, Gray, and Carney reprised their previous roles, joined by Eva Noblezada, De Shields, Carly Mercedes Dyer, Rosie Fletcher, and Gloria Onitiri.

=== Broadway (2019–present) ===
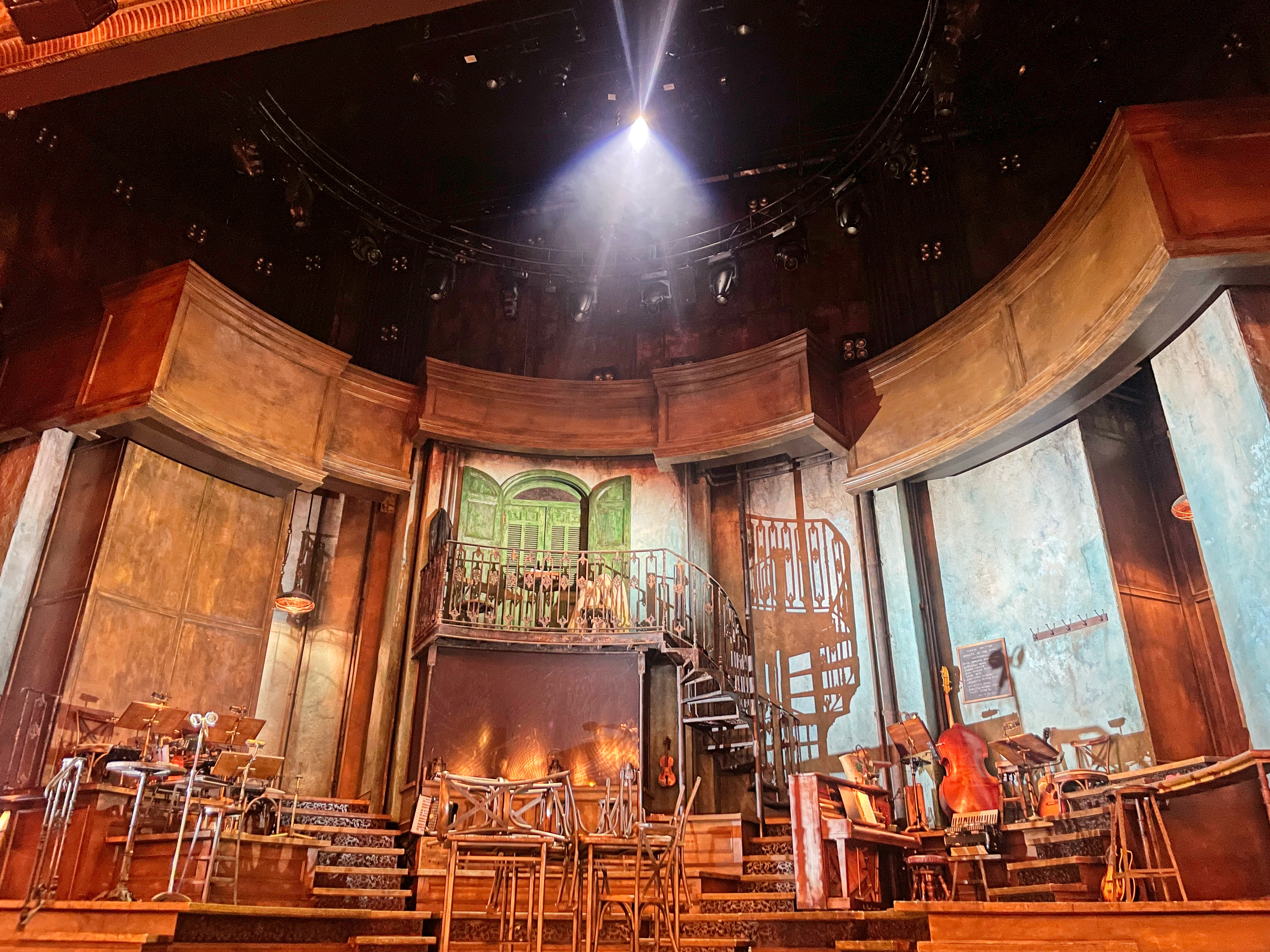
Set of the Broadway production

Hadestown opened on Broadway at the Walter Kerr Theatre, with previews beginning on March 22, 2019, and an official opening on April 17, 2019. Page, Gray, De Shields, Carney, and Noblezada reprised their roles, joined by Jewelle Blackman, González-Nacer and Kay Trinidad. The Broadway production was produced by Mara Isaacs, Dale Franzen, Hunter Arnold and Tom Kirdahy. Designs were again by Hauck (sets), Krass (costumes), King (lighting), Steinberg and Paz (sound), and Neumann again choreographed. During the COVID-19 pandemic, performances were indefinitely suspended on March 12, 2020, then resumed on September 2, 2021. Hadestown is the longest-running show at the Walter Kerr Theatre.

=== South Korea (2021–2022) ===
A South Korean production of Hadestown ran from August 2021 to February 2022, at the LG Arts Center in Seoul. This Korean-language production starred Zo Hyung-gyun, Kang-hyun Park, and Xiumin rotating as Orpheus, and Kim Hwan-hee and Kim Soo-ha rotating as Eurydice. The production won Best Musical at the Korea Musical Awards. The musical returned to South Korea from July 12, 2024 and was expected to play until October 6 at the Charlotte Theater in Seoul. Hyung-gyun and Park reprised the role of Orpheus, with Kim Min-seok. Hwan-hee and Soo-ha reprised their roles as Eurydice.

=== North American national tour (2021–2024) ===
A national tour was planned for 2020. Due to the COVID-19 pandemic, the tour was postponed to 2021. It launched at the John F. Kennedy Center for the Performing Arts in Washington, D.C., where it ran for three weeks starting October 15, 2021. Prior to the launch, the production had a tryout at the Peace Center in Greenville, South Carolina, from October 5 to 10, 2021. The tour starred Nicholas Barasch as Orpheus, Morgan Siobhan Green as Eurydice, Kevyn Morrow as Hades, Kimberly Marable as Persephone, Levi Kreis as Hermes, and Belén Moyano, Bex Odorisio, and Shea Renne as the Fates. The tour closed on May 26, 2024 in Toronto, Ontario, Canada, after more than 980 performances in 85 cities across the U.S. and Canada.

=== North American national tour (2024–present) ===
A non-Equity national tour began on October 3, 2024 at the Palace Theater in Waterbury, Connecticut. It is directed by Keenan Tyler Oliphant and choreographed by T. Oliver Reid. The cast originally starred Nickolaus Colón as Hades, Megan Colton as Eurydice, Jaylon C. Crump as Hermes, Namisa Mdlalose Bizana as Persephone and Bryan Munar as Orpheus. Performances are scheduled to end at Buell Theatre in Denver, Colorado, in June 2027.

=== West End (2024–present) ===
Hadestown began previews on February 10, 2024, in the West End with an official opening on February 21, at the Lyric Theatre, London. The cast includes Dónal Finn as Orpheus, Grace Hodgett Young as Eurydice, Zachary James as Hades, Melanie La Barrie as Hermes, and Gloria Onitiri as Persephone. The production is scheduled to run to at least June 2027. A live cast recording was released on December 6, 2024.

Five of the original London and Broadway cast members, Carney, Noblezada, Page, Gray and De Shields, were set to reprise their roles in the West End production for five weeks in February and March 2025. Tickets sold out for this cast's return in "a matter of hours". After Page was injured during rehearsals, however, Phillip Boykin stepped into the role, joining the other four. Page returned only for the filming of the production with this cast on February 28 and March 1, 2025. Cast replacements in March 2026 include Rachel Adedeji as Persephone, Bethany Antonia as Eurydice and Clive Rowe as Hermes.

The filmed version was released theatrically in North America on July 24, 2026.

=== Australia (2025) ===
A production opened in Sydney, Australia, at the Theatre Royal, on February 10, 2025, co-produced by Opera Australia. The cast included Christine Anu as Hermes, Noah Mullins as Orpheus, Abigail Adriano as Eurydice, Adrian Tamburini as Hades and Elenoa Rokobaro as Persephone. The production closed in Sydney on April 26, opened at Her Majesty's Theatre, Melbourne, on May 8 and closed on July 13.

=== Netherlands (2025) ===
A staging opened in Amsterdam, Netherlands, at the Royal Theater Carré on June 20, 2025. The cast includes Claudia de Breij and Maarten Heijmans as Hermes, Jeangu Macrooy as Orpheus, Sara Afiba as Eurydice, Edwin Jonker as Hades, and Joy Wielkens as Persephone. The production closed on September 6, 2025.

=== Upcoming productions ===
A UK and Ireland tour is expected to begin at Curve, Leicester, from 19 February 2027. A Polish-language adaptation is planned for the Teatr Syrena in Warsaw, Poland, in late 2027. A Danish-language production is planned for the Østre Gasværk Teater in Copenhagen, Denmark, from September 17, 2027, with Søren Torpegaard Lund as Orpheus.

== Casts ==
Original casts of original production and major-market revivals of Hadestown:

Character	Concept Album	Off-Broadway	Broadway	North American Tour	West End
Character	2010	2016	2019	2021	2024
Orpheus	Justin Vernon	Damon Daunno	Reeve Carney	Nicholas Barasch	Dónal Finn
Eurydice	Anaïs Mitchell	Nabiyah Be	Eva Noblezada	Morgan Siobhan Green	Grace Hodgett Young
Hades	Greg Brown	Patrick Page	Patrick Page	Kevyn Morrow	Zachary James
Persephone	Ani DiFranco	Amber Gray	Amber Gray	Kimberly Marable	Gloria Onitiri
Hermes	Ben Knox Miller	Chris Sullivan	André De Shields	Levi Kreis	Melanie La Barrie
The Fates	The Haden Triplets	Lulu Fall; Jessie Shelton; Shaina Taub	Jewelle Blackman; Kay Trinidad; Yvette González-Nacer	Belén Moyano; Bex Odorisio; Shea Renne	Bella Brown; Madeline Charlemagne; Allie Daniel

=== Notable replacements ===
Broadway (2019–)

- Orpheus: Jordan Fisher, Carlos Valdes, Ali Louis Bourzgui, Jack Wolfe, Joshua Colley
- Eurydice: Solea Pfeiffer, Lola Tung, Isa Briones, Maia Reficco, Hailey Kilgore, Myra Molloy, Morgan Dudley, Jasmin Savoy Brown
- Hades: Tom Hewitt, Phillip Boykin, Paulo Szot, Gary Dourdan, Ben Davis
- Persephone: Lana Gordon, Betty Who, Ani DiFranco, Yola, Allison Russell, Merle Dandridge, Rebecca Naomi Jones, Gaby Moreno, Amber Iman
- Hermes: Lillias White, Jon Jon Briones, Stephanie Mills, Daniel Breaker, Kurt Elling, J. Harrison Ghee, Norbert Leo Butz

North American Tour (2021–2024)

- Persephone: Maria-Christina Oliveras, Lana Gordon
- Hermes: Nathan Lee Graham

West End (2024–)

- Orpheus: Reeve Carney, Nathan Sykes
- Eurydice: Eva Noblezada, Bethany Antonia
- Hades: Trevor Dion Nicholas, Phillip Boykin, Patrick Page, Chris Jarman, Shaun Dooley
- Persephone: Rachel Tucker, Amber Gray, Victoria Hamilton-Barritt, Nicola Roberts, Rachel Adedeji, Danielle de Niese
- Hermes: André De Shields, Daniel Breaker, Clive Rowe

== Recordings ==
Mitchell's 2007 album The Brightness contains the song "Hades & Persephone", which was renamed "How Long?" for the musical. Mitchell released a concept album, based on the musical, on March 9, 2010, through Righteous Babe Records. A live cast recording of the off-Broadway production was released on October 6, 2017, through Parlophone Records. A four-track EP entitled Why We Build the Wall (Selections from Hadestown. The Myth. The Musical. Live Original Cast Recording) was released for digital retailers on October 13, 2016, to promote the album.

A Broadway cast recording was released digitally on July 26, 2019, through Sing It Again Records. The two-CD recording was available at a later date. The album won the Grammy Award for Best Musical Theater Album. A holiday album recorded by Blackman, Gonzalez-Nacer and Trinidad titled If the Fates Allow was released on November 20, 2020, and features guest contributions from the other original cast members.

A live recording of selections from the West End production was released on December 6, 2024 on streaming, CD and vinyl.

== Themes ==
Writer Anaïs Mitchell said she was inspired by Les Misérables to write a musical that was about the power of both romance and politics: "It's a love story, but politics really is romantic." Todd Osborne comments on the self-conscious significance of the medium of song within the work: "It is a musical both about how art can save us and how, especially in an apocalyptic world, hope might be the only thing we have left." Hadestown blends versions of Greek myths with contemporary social and political themes such as "the tension between art and domesticity" and "a parable of climate change".

US cultural commentator Bridget Read highlights the economic themes: "Orpheus and Eurydice's tragedy becomes, in the hands of Mitchell, an argument for collective bargaining ... I don't think it's untoward of me to hear the class politics in a musical in which the characters sing the word poverty more times than I've ever heard it before in the vicinity of Times Square."

The original production's director, Chavkin, said that climate change had always been central to the show: "As we thought more and more about shaping the world that Eurydice and Orpheus are living in – a world caused, in Greek mythological terms, by the decay of the ancient marriage between Hades and Persephone, a world that is out of balance, where it is either freezing or blazing hot, where food becomes scarcer and the idea of stability becomes harder to imagine, and a character, Eurydice, who has spent her life running – all of those things kind of crystallized while we were making the show." The show did a joint promotion with Natural Resources Defense Council to raise awareness and bring a greater sense of urgency to the push for action on the issue of climate change.

== Reception ==
The New York Times described the Off-Broadway production as "inventive" and "gorgeously sung", praising its simplicity and intimacy. The Hollywood Reporter described the added dialogue as "wince-inducing" but favored its high energy and immersive staging. Several reviews drew parallels between the song "Why We Build the Wall" and Donald Trump's 2016 presidential campaign, though the song predates the campaign by about a decade.

The original Broadway production received uniformly strong reviews, with praise for its direction and the performances (particularly that of André De Shields). The New York Times called it "gorgeous" and "hypnotic", especially noting its improvement from the New York Theatre Workshop version. David Rooney of The Hollywood Reporter calls it "utterly fabulous", in particular praising the performances of Gray and Page. Japanese producer Madoka Imura (井村まどか) and theatre journalist Yusei Kageyama (影山雄成) praised the musical for its novelty and creativity, contrasting this to a Broadway trend to "avoid risks" by adapting films and recasting classics.

The first West End production received a similar reception, with reviewers praising Chavkin's direction, the score, the staging and the performances. The Guardian described the production as retaining "a tremendous soul and offbeat spirit", calling it "big, beautiful and emotionally blasting" and "one of the best West End musicals around". Time Out praised the staging, musical arrangements and emotional intensity. WhatsOnStage called it "the most exhilarating ride", highlighting the score, direction and performances. The Times review said the production was "a magical musical that touches the heart". Writing in the Daily Express, Stefan Kyriazis rated the production five stars, describing it as "achingly beautiful and boldly original".

== Awards and nominations ==
=== Off-Broadway production ===
Year	Award	Category	Nominee	Result
2016	American Academy of Arts and Letters	Richard Rodgers Award for Musical Theater		Won
2017	Drama Desk Awards	Outstanding Musical		Nominated
2017	Drama Desk Awards	Outstanding Lighting Design for a Musical	Bradley King	Nominated
2017	Drama League Awards	Outstanding Production of a Broadway or Off-Broadway Musical		Nominated
2017	Lucille Lortel Awards	Outstanding Musical		Nominated
2017	Lucille Lortel Awards	Outstanding Choreographer	David Neumann	Nominated
2017	Lucille Lortel Awards	Outstanding Lead Actor in a Musical	Patrick Page	Nominated
2017	Lucille Lortel Awards	Outstanding Lead Actress in a Musical	Amber Gray	Nominated
2017	Lucille Lortel Awards	Outstanding Featured Actor in a Musical	Chris Sullivan	Nominated
2017	Lucille Lortel Awards	Outstanding Scenic Design	Rachel Hauck	Nominated
2017	Lucille Lortel Awards	Outstanding Sound Design	Robert Kaplowitz	Nominated
2017	Outer Critics Circle Awards	Outstanding New Off-Broadway Musical		Nominated
2017	Off-Broadway Alliance Awards	Best New Musical		Nominated

=== Edmonton production ===
Year	Award	Category	Nominee	Result
2018	Elizabeth Sterling Haynes Award	Timothy Ryan Award for Outstanding Production of a Musical		Nominated
2018	Elizabeth Sterling Haynes Award	Outstanding Director	Rachel Chavkin	Nominated
2018	Elizabeth Sterling Haynes Award	Outstanding Performance by an Actress in a Supporting Role	Amber Gray	Won
2018	Elizabeth Sterling Haynes Award	Outstanding Set Design	Rachel Hauck	Nominated
2018	Elizabeth Sterling Haynes Award	Outstanding Costume Design	Michael Krass	Nominated
2018	Elizabeth Sterling Haynes Award	Outstanding Lighting Design	Bradley King	Won
2018	Elizabeth Sterling Haynes Award	Outstanding Musical Director	Liam Robinson	Nominated
2018	Elizabeth Sterling Haynes Award	Outstanding Choreography or Fight Direction	David Neumann	Nominated

=== Broadway production ===
Year	Award	Category	Nominee	Result
2019	Tony Awards	Best Musical		Won
2019	Tony Awards	Best Book of a Musical	Anaïs Mitchell	Nominated
2019	Tony Awards	Best Original Score	Anaïs Mitchell	Won
2019	Tony Awards	Best Performance by an Actress in a Leading Role in a Musical	Eva Noblezada	Nominated
2019	Tony Awards	Best Performance by an Actor in a Featured Role in a Musical	André De Shields	Won
2019	Tony Awards	Best Performance by an Actor in a Featured Role in a Musical	Patrick Page	Nominated
2019	Tony Awards	Best Performance by an Actress in a Featured Role in a Musical	Amber Gray	Nominated
2019	Tony Awards	Best Scenic Design in a Musical	Rachel Hauck	Won
2019	Tony Awards	Best Costume Design in a Musical	Michael Krass	Nominated
2019	Tony Awards	Best Lighting Design in a Musical	Bradley King	Won
2019	Tony Awards	Best Sound Design of a Musical	Nevin Steinberg and Jessica Paz	Won
2019	Tony Awards	Best Direction of a Musical	Rachel Chavkin	Won
2019	Tony Awards	Best Choreography	David Neumann	Nominated
2019	Tony Awards	Best Orchestrations	Michael Chorney and Todd Sickafoose	Won
2019	Drama Desk Awards	Outstanding Featured Actor in a Musical	André De Shields	Won
2019	Drama Desk Awards	Outstanding Director of a Musical	Rachel Chavkin	Won
2019	Drama Desk Awards	Outstanding Choreography	David Neumann	Nominated
2019	Drama Desk Awards	Outstanding Scenic Design for a Musical	Rachel Hauck	Nominated
2019	Drama Desk Awards	Outstanding Costume Design for a Musical	Michael Krass	Nominated
2019	Drama Desk Awards	Outstanding Lighting Design for a Musical	Bradley King	Won
2019	Drama Desk Awards	Outstanding Sound Design in a Musical	Nevin Steinberg and Jessica Paz	Won
2019	Drama League Awards	Outstanding Production of a Broadway or Off-Broadway Musical		Won
2019	Drama League Awards	Distinguished Performance Award	Amber Gray	Nominated
2019	Drama League Awards	Distinguished Performance Award	André De Shields	Nominated
2019	Outer Critics Circle Awards	Outstanding New Broadway Musical		Won
2019	Outer Critics Circle Awards	Outstanding Book of a Musical (Broadway or Off-Broadway)	Anaïs Mitchell	Nominated
2019	Outer Critics Circle Awards	Outstanding New Score (Broadway or Off-Broadway)	Anaïs Mitchell	Won
2019	Outer Critics Circle Awards	Outstanding Actor in a Musical	Reeve Carney	Nominated
2019	Outer Critics Circle Awards	Outstanding Featured Actor in a Musical	André De Shields	Won
2019	Outer Critics Circle Awards	Outstanding Featured Actress in a Musical	Amber Gray	Won
2019	Outer Critics Circle Awards	Outstanding Director of a Musical	Rachel Chavkin	Won
2019	Outer Critics Circle Awards	Outstanding Choreographer	David Neumann	Nominated
2019	Outer Critics Circle Awards	Outstanding Scenic Design (Play or Musical)	Rachel Hauck	Nominated
2019	Outer Critics Circle Awards	Outstanding Lighting Design (Play or Musical)	Bradley King	Won
2019	Outer Critics Circle Awards	Outstanding Sound Design (Play or Musical)	Nevin Steinberg and Jessica Paz	Nominated
2019	Outer Critics Circle Awards	Outstanding Orchestrations	Michael Chorney and Todd Sickafoose	Nominated
2019	Chita Rivera Awards			
2019	Chita Rivera Awards	Outstanding Choreography in a Broadway Show	David Neumann	Won
2019	Chita Rivera Awards	Outstanding Female Dancer in a Broadway Show	Amber Gray	Nominated
2019	Chita Rivera Awards	Outstanding Ensemble in a Broadway Show		Nominated

=== West End production ===
Year	Award	Category	Nominee	Result
2024	Laurence Olivier Awards	Best Musical Revival		Nominated
2025	WhatsOnStage Awards	Best Musical Revival		Nominated
2025	WhatsOnStage Awards	Best Supporting Performer in a Musical	Melanie La Barrie	Won
2025	WhatsOnStage Awards	Best Musical Direction/Supervision	Talek Merchant and Liam Robinson	Won
