= Young Man in America =

Studio album by Anaïs Mitchell
- Released: February 13, 2012 (UK); February 28, 2012 (US)
- Genre: Folk; folk-pop
- Length: 45:27
- Label: Wilderland; Thirty Tigers
- Producer: Todd Sickafoose

Anaïs Mitchell chronology
Hadestown (2010)	Young Man in America (2012)	Child Ballads (2013)

Young Man in America is the fifth studio album by American singer-songwriter Anaïs Mitchell, released on Wilderland Records in the UK on February 13, 2012, and in the US on February 28, 2012. It is a folk and folk-pop album with elements of bluegrass and New Orleans jazz.

== Themes ==
Although the album does not tell a specific story like her previous album Hadestown, Mitchell has stated that the album was "influenced by the recession", and that many of the lyrics allude to the loss of certainty and the old ways in modern-day America: "There's a feeling that the American is something of an orphan, that we can't trust we're going to be taken care of". Many of the tracks tell stories related to children and parenting, and Mitchell told Uncut magazine that she was conscious of having reached the age of 30 without yet becoming a parent.

The track "Shepherd" was based on a short story written by her father Don, who was a novelist before he became a university professor. The album's front cover features a photograph of him at the age of 30, the same age as his daughter Anaïs when she made the album.

== Reception ==
Professional ratings
Aggregate scores
Source	Rating
Metacritic	86/100
Review scores
Source	Rating
American Songwriter	4/5 stars
Clash	8/10
Drowned in Sound	8/10
The Guardian	4/5 stars
The Independent	5/5 stars
musicOMH	5/5 stars
Pitchfork	7.8/10
PopMatters	8/10
Q	4/5 stars
Uncut	8/10

The album gained wide critical acclaim upon its release. In the UK Uncut magazine called it a "remarkable, genre-defying album" and the BBC's online music review described it as "a modern folk record that snaps and sparkles with energy, daring to take on some formidable themes in the process... a marvel of a record from start to finish". musicOMH was convinced that "with Young Man In America, Anaïs Mitchell has created her second consecutive masterpiece" and feeling that while "there's a deep sense of sadness permeating through the album", the result was that "none of this is depressing or maudlin though... there's a warm, comfortable feeling to each of the 11 songs". Q said the album was "equally magical and rewarding" [as Hadestown], and "marks her out as a true American original". Pitchfork believed that Young Man in America was "more intimate and accessible than its predecessor" and that "Mitchell's songs are never whimsical, sentimental, or light... the results are consistently immersive and rich". PopMatters view was that "Young Man in America is born from sorrow, suffering, shattered dreams and incendiary youth 'waiting on oblivion', yet it's one of the most life-affirming musical journeys you'll have all year". British newspaper The Guardian noted the themes touched on by the album, saying "She transforms her surveys of her country's belligerence and social irresponsibility into powerful rituals smeared with blood and dirt. Certain themes recur: the mother as shelterer, the father as shepherd, both vulnerable, both imposing fearful legacies." Drowned in Sound was impressed that the album followed up the highly acclaimed Hadestown with great success, saying "Narrowing her scope without lowering her ambition, Mitchell delivers a more traditional collection of singer-songwriter tracks, and does so without any marked drop in quality from its incredible predecessor": by the end it has "become perfectly clear that Mitchell has created a deeply affecting album which preserves everything that was so marvelous about her beloved folk-opera, and ultimately performs a very handsome job of keeping out of its vast shadow".

== Track listing ==
All songs written and composed by Anaïs Mitchell, except where noted.

1. "Wilderland" – 3:08
2. "Young Man in America" – 5:31
3. "Coming Down" – 3:06
4. "Dyin' Day" – 3:07
5. "Venus" – 2:21
6. "He Did" – 4:05
7. "Annmarie" (Anaïs Mitchell, Todd Sickafoose) – 4:11
8. "Tailor" – 3:46
9. "Shepherd" (Anaïs Mitchell, Don Mitchell) – 5:33
10. "You Are Forgiven" – 4:14
11. "Ships" – 6:25
