= Hymns for the Exiled =

Studio album by Anaïs Mitchell
- Released: September 21, 2004
- Genre: Folk, Indie folk
- Length: 38:39
- Label: Waterbug
- Producer: Michael Chorney

Anaïs Mitchell chronology
The Song They Sang... When Rome Fell (2002)	Hymns for the Exiled (2004)	The Brightness (2007)

Professional ratings
Review scores
Source	Rating
The Guardian	3/5 stars

Hymns for the Exiled is the second studio album by American folksinger Anaïs Mitchell, released in 2004 on Waterbug Records. It was recorded at The Gristmill in Bristol, Vermont, and produced by Michael Chorney.

== Track listing ==
All tracks are written by Anaïs Mitchell except for "Two Kids", by Mitchell and Noor al-Din Ba'aj.

Hymns for the Exiled
No.	Title	Length
1.	"Before the Eyes of Storytelling Girls"	3:07
2.	"1984"	2:55
3.	"Cosmic American"	3:41
4.	"The Belly and the Beast"	4:48
5.	"Orion"	4:10
6.	"Mockingbird"	3:11
7.	"I Wear Your Dress"	3:04
8.	"Quecreek Flood"	4:18
9.	"A Hymn for the Exiled"	3:04
10.	"Two Kids"	3:50
11.	"One Good Thing"	2:20
