= Hadestown (album) =

Studio album by Anaïs Mitchell
- Released: March 9, 2010
- Genres: Folk; Americana; indie folk
- Length: 57:17
- Label: Righteous Babe
- Producer: Todd Sickafoose

Anaïs Mitchell chronology
Country E.P. (2007)	Hadestown (2010)	Young Man in America (2012)

Hadestown is the fourth studio album by American folk singer-songwriter Anaïs Mitchell, and was released by Righteous Babe Records on March 9, 2010. Recorded as a concept album, Hadestown became the basis for the stage musical of the same name, following a variation on the ancient Greek myth of Orpheus and Eurydice, where Orpheus must embark on a quest to rescue his wife Eurydice from the underworld. It has been advertised as a "folk opera". Several of the songs feature singers other than Mitchell, including Justin Vernon, Ani DiFranco, Greg Brown, Ben Knox Miller, and The Haden Triplets (Tanya, Petra and Rachel Haden).

The album was nominated for a Grammy Award for Best Recording Package in the 53rd Annual Grammy Awards.

== Production ==
Between 2006 and 2007, Mitchell staged performances of Hadestown, a musical based on the Greek myth of Orpheus and Eurydice. Unsure what lay ahead for the stage musical, she decided to turn it into a concept album. Raising a few thousand dollars by emailing her fan base and asking them to pitch in for shirts and other merchandise, Mitchell worked on the album for over a year.

The album features orchestral arrangements by Michael Chorney, who had worked with Mitchell's recordings since her album Hymns for the Exiled in 2004.

Within the narrative of the album, the part of Orpheus is played by Vernon; Persephone by DiFranco; Hades by Greg Brown; The Fates by Tanya, Petra and Rachel Haden; Hermes by Ben Knox Miller; and Eurydice by Mitchell.

While most of the recording was produced by Todd Sickafoose at Brooklyn Recording Studio in New York City, the lead vocals were often produced elsewhere in the United States.

The album encompasses a variety of American roots music forms, including folk, indie folk, country, blues, ragtime, gospel, rock, swing, and avant-garde.

== Plot ==
As the album begins, "Wedding Song" describes the courtship of Orpheus (Justin Vernon) and Eurydice (Anaïs Mitchell). Living in a time of economic depression, she asks him how he can possibly afford to marry her and give her a good life, to which he replies that his musicianship will bring them everything they desire. Although she loves Orpheus, Eurydice seems wary and unsure whether he can provide for them. Orpheus then sings of how Hades built his empire in the underworld, using exploitation and trickery to force the residents to do his bidding ("Epic Part I"). In the next song, "Way down Hadestown", Hadestown and the road to it is described from different perspectives by Hermes (Ben Knox Miller), Persephone (Ani DiFranco), Eurydice, Orpheus and The Fates (The Haden Triplets). The different characters depict the place either in a positive light, or in a negative one, or both: it is said to be the only available source of money and employment and ruled by a rich and mighty "king" (Hermes, Eurydice and The Fates), but also a place of drudgery, exploitation, slavery and soullessness (Orpheus and Hermes). Persephone, for her part, sings that as winter is coming, her husband is coming to take her home to Hadestown. Eurydice begins to question her quality of life and entertains the tempting thought of life in Hadestown. In "Hey, Little Songbird" Hades himself (Greg Brown) tempts Eurydice, stressing the hopelessness of her current financial circumstances, and offers her to join him in the underworld, where she will be materially provided for and sheltered.

Eurydice apologises for leaving Orpheus, saying that she allowed her material need for basic necessities to overrule her heart; the Fates chastise the listeners for judging her from their life of comfort ("Gone, I'm Gone"). They proceed to argue that nobody is sure to make a morally right choice when things get really tough ("When the Chips Are Down"). Orpheus is determined to rescue his love from Hadestown; Hermes warns him that it will be a difficult task to accomplish but gives him advice about how to survive the journey and shows him to the train ("Wait for Me"). Meanwhile, Hades reinforces his power over the underworld by manipulating its residents into believing that, although they must work tirelessly to do Hades' bidding, the outside world of poverty and unemployment is much worse. Therefore, Hades is able to seem as if he is a benevolent ruler who is, in fact, protecting his people rather than enslaving them ("Why We Build the Wall").

Orpheus travels through Hadestown and comes across a speakeasy run by Persephone. Instead of alcohol, Persephone offers the joys of life on the surface (such as rain, wind, stars and sunlight) to her customers ("Our Lady of the Underground"). In "Flowers", Eurydice, who is employed by Hades and appears to have become his mistress, realises what a terrible mistake she made being tempted by his wealth and power. She regrets leaving Orpheus and expresses her wish to being reunited with him. The Fates try to persuade Orpheus to abandon his quest to rescue Eurydice, telling him there is no chance he will succeed and trying will only bring him pain ("Nothing Changes"). Their words trouble him and he begins to wonder if he will ever see his true love again ("If It's True").

Persephone tries to convince Hades to be kind to Orpheus and let him rescue Eurydice ("How Long?"), while Hades says that yielding to Orpheus would be a dangerous precedent that eventually causes his entire regime to crumble. When Orpheus finally reaches Hades, he implores him to let Eurydice go, singing a song in praise of love. He appeals to Hades' sympathy by reminding him that Hades, too, once fell in love with Persephone in the same way as Orpheus loves Eurydice. Orpheus' song is so powerful that Hades feels forced to grant his wish. However, fearing that his entire underworld kingdom will revolt against him if he shows weakness by letting Orpheus have his way, he devises a plan that will thwart the couple's intentions: they are permitted to leave Hadestown together so long as Eurydice follows Orpheus and he does not turn around ("His Kiss, the Riot").

As they journey back to the surface together, doubt begins to plague Orpheus. He is seized by fear because he is unable to see Eurydice and does not know if she is truly following him. As they walk Eurydice tries to reassure him that she loves him, but he doesn't seem to hear or react to her words and eventually turns ("Doubt Comes In"). In the album's closing track, "I Raise My Cup to Him", Persephone and Eurydice both raise a sad toast to Orpheus, who was forced to return to the surface alone, while nevertheless celebrating his courage to challenge the powers that be in tough times.

== Reception ==
Professional ratings
Aggregate scores
Source	Rating
AnyDecentMusic?	8.8/10
Review scores
Source	Rating
About.com	4.5/5 stars
Allmusic	4/5 stars
BBC	(positive)
Drowned in Sound	10/10 stars
The Guardian	5/5 stars
NME	9/10 stars
The Observer	(very positive)
Stereo Subversion	A
The Times	5/5 stars
Uncut	5/5 stars

Upon release, Hadestown was universally acclaimed by critics. Drowned in Sound awarded the album a 10/10, stating that "Mitchell traverses such a sweeping range of emotions, genres and styles over the course of Hadestown, it’s frankly remarkable that the whole thing works at all. That it works so brilliantly well, that in under an hour it creates a world you’ll want to return to time and time again, that it is a glittering model of the form – of collaboration itself – is nothing short of awe-inspiring." The Guardian and NME were similarly effusive in their praise, awarding the album 5/5 and 9/10 respectively. Stereo Subversion's Jonathan Sanders gave the album a perfect score and called it "a lasting example of where folk music can go when the right musicians take hold of history." The album also topped review aggregator website AnyDecentMusic?'s all time chart with an 8.9, the highest rating for any album until Frank Ocean's Channel Orange.

"Why We Build the Wall" was later covered by English country folk musician Billy Bragg on his 2018 album Bridges Not Walls.

In 2017 it was ranked number 63 in Paste's "The 100 Best Indie Folk Albums".

== Stage musical ==
Mitchell continued working on an expanded theatrical version of Hadestown, and in May 2016 the show debuted at New York Theatre Workshop, having been developed with and directed by Rachel Chavkin. In November 2017, the show received its Canadian premiere at Citadel Theatre in Edmonton, Alberta, and in April 2018 it was announced that Hadestown would open later the same year at London's Royal National Theatre before transferring to the Walter Kerr Theatre on Broadway, where it went on to win the Tony Award for Best Musical and Tony Award for Best Original Score in 2019, among six other Tony Awards.

On November 21, 2023, it was announced that Ani DiFranco, who sang Persephone on the album, would reprise the role on Broadway in 2024, replacing singer Betty Who.

== Track listing ==
All tracks are written by Anaïs Mitchell, except "Papers (Hades Finds Out)" composed by Michael Chorney, and "Lover's Desire", a traditional Afghani song.

Hadestown track listing
No.	Title	Featured vocalist(s)	Length
1.	"Wedding Song"	Justin Vernon	3:18
2.	"Epic (Part I)"	Vernon	2:22
3.	"Way Down Hadestown"	Vernon; Ani DiFranco; Ben Knox Miller	3:33
4.	"Songbird Intro"		0:24
5.	"Hey, Little Songbird"	Greg Brown	3:09
6.	"Gone, I'm Gone"	The Haden Triplets	1:09
7.	"When the Chips are Down"	The Haden Triplets	2:14
8.	"Wait for Me"	Miller; Vernon	3:06
9.	"Why We Build the Wall"	Brown	4:18
10.	"Our Lady of the Underground"	DiFranco	4:40
11.	"Flowers (Eurydice's Song)"		3:33
12.	"Nothing Changes"	The Haden Triplets	0:52
13.	"If It's True"	Vernon	3:03
14.	"Papers (Hades Finds Out)"		1:24
15.	"How Long?"	DiFranco; Brown	3:36
16.	"Epic (Part II)"	Vernon	2:55
17.	"Lover's Desire"		2:05
18.	"His Kiss, the Riot"	Brown	4:03
19.	"Doubt Comes In"	Vernon	5:32
20.	"I Raise My Cup to Him"	DiFranco	2:10
Total length:			57:17

== Personnel ==
- Anaïs Mitchell – vocals (Eurydice), acoustic guitar, art direction
- Justin Vernon – vocals (Orpheus), engineer
- Ben Knox Miller – vocals (Hermes)
- Ani DiFranco – vocals (Persephone), mixing
- Greg Brown – vocals (Hades)
- The Haden Triplets – vocals (The Fates)
- Michael Chorney – acoustic guitar, prepared guitar, orchestration, arrangement
- Ben T. Matchstick – harmonica, voice
- Jim Black – drums, percussion
- Todd Sickafoose – bass, piano, pump organ, arrangement, mixing, producer
- Tanya Kalmanovitch – viola
- Marika Hughes – cello
- Josh Roseman – trombone
- Nate Wooley – trumpet
- Rob Burger – accordion, piano
- Miguel Frasconi – glass orchestra
- Rich Hinman – pedal steel guitar
- Brandon Seabrook – 4-string banjo, electric guitar, noise tapes
- Jonathan Goldberger – electric guitar
- Mike Dillon – vibraphone
- Andy Taub – engineer
- Ben Liscio – assistant engineer
- Mike Napolitano – engineer, mixing
- John Svec – engineer
- Rich Breen – engineer
- Bennett Shapiro – engineer
- Alan Douches – mastering
- Peter Nevins – illustrations, art direction
- Brian Grunert – art direction, design

== Charts ==
Chart (2010)	Peak position
US Heatseekers Albums (Billboard)	33
US Americana/Folk Albums (Billboard)	9
