= Anaïs Mitchell =

American singer-songwriter

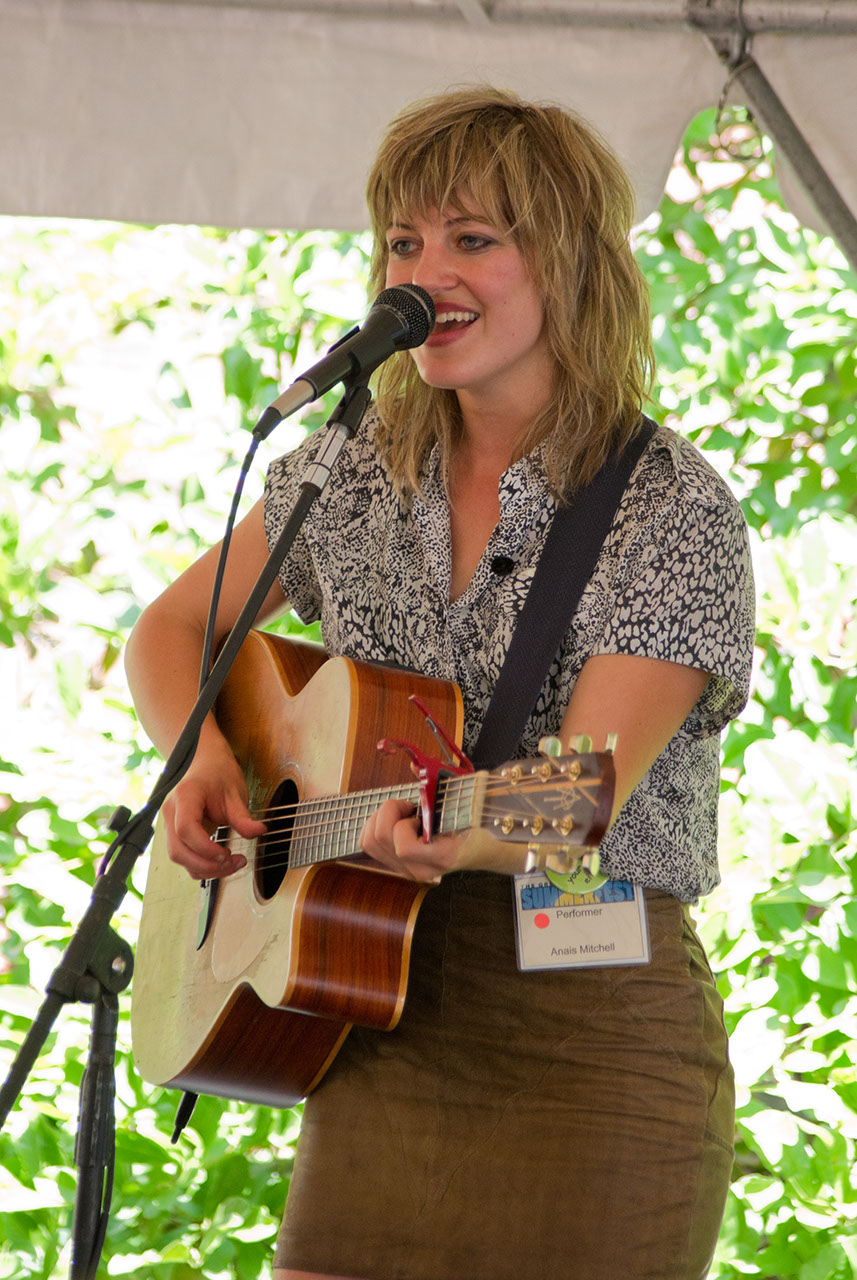
- Mitchell in 2010

Background information
- Born: March 26, 1981 (age 45)
- Origin: Montpelier, Vermont, U.S.
- Genres: Indie folk, Americana, country folk, pop music
- Occupations: Singer-songwriter; musician; playwright
- Instruments: Vocals; guitar; piano
- Years active: 2002–present
- Labels: Waterbug; Righteous Babe; Wilderland; Thirty Tigers; BMG
- Spouse: Noah Hahn (m. 2006)
- Website: www.anaismitchell.com

Anaïs Mitchell (/əˈneɪ.ɪs/; born March 26, 1981) is an American singer-songwriter, musician, and playwright. She has released eight studio albums throughout her career, including Hadestown (2010), Young Man in America (2012), Child Ballads (2013), and Anaïs Mitchell (2022).

With theatre director Rachel Chavkin, Mitchell developed Hadestown into a stage musical. It premiered off-Broadway in 2016, and made its Broadway debut three years later to critical acclaim. Hadestown won eight awards at the 73rd Annual Tony Awards, including Best Musical. For her work, Mitchell won the Tony Award for Best Original Score and was nominated for Best Book of a Musical. She additionally won the Grammy Award for Best Musical Theater Album. In 2020, Mitchell published her first book, Working on a Song: The Lyrics of Hadestown, and was named by Time magazine as one of the 100 most influential people in the world.

Mitchell is a member of the band Bonny Light Horseman, whose self-titled debut was released in 2020. The band's second album, Golden Rolling Holy, was released in 2022, followed by Keep Me on Your Mind/See You Free in 2024.

== Early life ==
Mitchell's father, a novelist and college professor, named her after author Anaïs Nin. She grew up on Treleven farm in Addison County, Vermont and graduated from Mount Abraham Union High School. She was raised Quaker. Her mother was Deputy Secretary of Vermont's Agency of Human Services. After traveling to the Middle East, Europe and Latin America as a child, she attended Middlebury College, where she majored in political science and graduated in 2004.

== Career ==
She began writing her first songs at the age of 17, around 1998. Just five years later Mitchell won the New Folk award in 2003, when she was 22, at the Kerrville Folk Festival. Her album Hymns for the Exiled was released on Chicago's Waterbug Records label in 2004. This recording attracted the attention of singer-songwriter Ani DiFranco, who signed her to the Righteous Babe Records label.

In 2006, Mitchell debuted a draft of her "folk opera" Hadestown, which she wrote in collaboration with arranger Michael Chorney and director Ben T. Matchstick. A revised version of Hadestown was staged in 2007. Her third album, The Brightness, was released that same year on Righteous Babe Records.

Her album Hadestown, produced by Todd Sickafoose, was released in spring 2010 to favorable reviews. Described as "the story of Orpheus and Eurydice set in post-apocalyptic Depression-era America, the album includes guest appearances by Ani DiFranco, Greg Brown, Justin Vernon of Bon Iver, Ben Knox Miller of The Low Anthem, and The Haden Triplets (Petra, Rachel, and Tanya Haden).

Mitchell continued quietly working on a stage version of Hadestown while also writing and recording new material. In early 2012, she released Young Man in America on Wilderland Records. Mitchell opened the North American leg of Bon Iver's autumn 2012 tour, which included two sold-out shows at Radio City Music Hall. The album was largely praised by critics as "genre-defying" and her "second consecutive masterpiece."

In late 2012, Mitchell completed recording seven songs from the collection of Child Ballads, compiled by Francis James Child, with fellow musician Jefferson Hamer. The album, produced by Gary Paczosa, was released in February 2013, winning a BBC Radio 2 Folk Award for Best Traditional Song. This was followed in 2014 by xoa, for which Mitchell re-recorded a number of her older songs using only guitar and vocals. This stripped back album included some songs from Hadestown which were recorded for the first time in Mitchell's own voice, as well as three brand new songs.

In summer 2016, the newly expanded theatrical version of Hadestown opened at New York Theatre Workshop with Vogue magazine predicting that "Hadestown will be your next musical theatre obsession". The following year, it received its Canadian premiere at The Citadel Theatre, Edmonton, and in April 2018, London's National Theatre announced that it would present a three-month run during the winter ahead of the show's Broadway transfer. Hadestown opened on Broadway at the Walter Kerr Theatre on April 17, 2019.

In 2019, Mitchell was appearing as part of a three-piece "supergroup" called Bonny Light Horseman, consisting of herself, Eric D. Johnson of Fruit Bats and guitarist Josh Kaufman. The group's self-titled debut album was released on January 24, 2020.

In June 2021, American supergroup Big Red Machine announced their second studio album, How Long Do You Think It's Gonna Last?, which features Mitchell's guest vocals in three of its tracks: "Latter Days", "Phoenix", and "New Auburn".

== Personal life ==
While at Middlebury College, Mitchell met Noah Hahn, whom she married in 2006. They have two daughters, Ramona and Rosetta.

== Reception ==
Mitchell has received favorable reviews on her musical style, sound and performance. An article in Acoustic Guitar magazine calls Mitchell "fearlessly emotive" and compares her to Bob Dylan, Leonard Cohen, and Gillian Welch. The UK's Independent newspaper called her "the most engaging, and in some ways, most original artist currently working in the field of new American folk music" The New York Times noted that "Ms Mitchell's songs address contemporary angst with uncanny vision" and called her "a formidable songwriting talent".

== Discography ==
=== Studio albums ===
List of albums, with selected information
Title	Album details	Peak chart positions					
Title	Album details	US Folk	US Heat	SCO	UK Amer.	UK DL	UK Indie
The Song They Sang... When Rome Fell	Released: 2002; Label: Self-released; Formats: CD	—	—	—	—	–	–
Hymns for the Exiled	Released: September 21, 2004; Label: Waterbug; Formats: CD, digital download	—	—	—	—	–	–
The Brightness	Released: February 13, 2007; Label: Righteous Babe; Formats: CD, digital download	—	—	—	—	–	–
Hadestown	Released: March 9, 2010; Label: Righteous Babe; Formats: CD, digital download, LP	9	33	—	—	–	–
Young Man in America	Released: February 13, 2012; Label: Wilderland, Thirty Tigers; Formats: CD, digital download, LP	13	27	—	–	–	22
Child Ballads (with Jefferson Hamer)	Released: February 11, 2013; Label: Wilderland, Thirty Tigers; Formats: CD, digital download, LP	20	38	—	—	–	19
Xoa	Released: September 30, 2014; Label: Wilderland, Thirty Tigers; Formats: CD, digital download	—	—	—	—	–	–
Anaïs Mitchell	Released: January 28, 2022; Label: BMG Rights Management; Formats: CD, digital download, LP	—	—	37	3	30	10

=== EPs ===
List of albums, with selected information
Title	Album details
Country E.P. (with Rachel Ries)	Released: September 2, 2008; Label: Righteous Babe; Formats: Vinyl, CD, digital download

=== Cast albums ===
List of albums, with selected information
Title	Album details	Peak chart positions				
Title	Album details	US	US Indie	US Cast	UK DL	UK Indie
Why We Build The Wall (EP – Selections from Hadestown. The Myth. The Musical. Live Original Cast Recording)	Released: October 13, 2016; Label: Parlophone; Formats: digital download	—	—	—	—	—
Hadestown: The Myth. The Musical. (Live Original Cast Recording)	Released: October 6, 2017; Label: Parlophone, Warner Classics; Formats: CD, digital download	—	—	3	—	—
Hadestown (Original Broadway Cast Recording)	Released: July 26, 2019; Label: Sing It Again; Formats: CD, LP, digital download	49	4	1	21	25

=== Singles ===
==== As lead artist ====
Title	Year	Album
"I Heard the Bells on Christmas Day"	2016	Acoustic Christmas (An Amazon Music Original)
"Woyaya" (with Kate Stables)	2018	Love Me Not (Amazon Original)
"By Degrees" (with Mark Erelli, Rosanne Cash, Sheryl Crow, Lori McKenna, Josh Ritter)	2018	non-album single
"I Heard the Bells on Christmas Day" (with Thomas Bartlett)	2019	non-album single
"Minnesota" (with Mick Flannery)	2020	Mickmas EP, Vol. 3
"Grace Cathedral Hill"	2021	Stars Rock Kill (Rock Stars)
"Bright Star"	2021	Anaïs Mitchell
"Brooklyn Bridge"	2021	Anaïs Mitchell
"On Your Way (Felix Song)"	2022	Anaïs Mitchell

==== As featured artist ====
List of albums, with selected information
Title	Year	Peak chart positions	Album
Title	Year	US AAA	Album
"Phoenix" (Big Red Machine featuring Anaïs Mitchell and Fleet Foxes)	2021	33	How Long Do You Think It's Gonna Last?

=== Other appearances ===
Title	Year	Other artist(s)	Album
"Mockingbird"	2008	—N/a	Songs For Laura Volume One
"Quarter to Ten"	2008	Gregory Douglass	Turning Back Beautiful
"L'Internazionale"	2009	—N/a	Thrufters & Through-Stones: The Music of Vermont's First 400 Years
"All My Trials"	2009	—N/a	Beautiful Star – The Songs of Odetta
"Alight"	2013	Round Mountain	The Goat
"Even Then"	2013	The Bengsons	Hundred Days
"Wedding Song (Live)"	2013	—N/a	Live at Caffe Lena: Music From America's Legendary Coffeehouse
"Anchors"	2013	Kris Gruen	New Comics From the Wooden World
"Clyde Waters"	2013	Jefferson Hamer	The Mark Radcliffe Folk Sessions 2013

=== Audiobooks ===
- Working on a Song: The Lyrics of Hadestown (October 6, 2020; Penguin Audio)

== Awards and nominations ==
Year	Award	Category	Work	Result	Ref.
2003	Kerrville Folk Festival	New Folk Award		Won	
2010	Grammy Award	Best Recording Package	Hadestown	Nominated	
2014	BBC Radio 2 Folk Award	Best Traditional Track	"Willie of Winsbury" (shared with Jefferson Hamer)	Won	
2019	Tony Award	Best Original Score	Hadestown	Won	
2019	Tony Award	Best Book of a Musical	Hadestown	Nominated	
2019	Outer Critics Circle Award	Outstanding New Score (Broadway or Off-Broadway)	Hadestown	Won	
2019	Outer Critics Circle Award	Outstanding Book of a Musical (Broadway or Off-Broadway)	Hadestown	Nominated	
2019	Americana Music Honors & Awards	Song of the Year	"By Degrees" (with Mark Erelli, Rosanne Cash, Sheryl Crow, Lori McKenna and Josh Ritter)	Nominated	
2020	Grammy Award	Best Musical Theater Album	Hadestown	Won	
2021	Grammy Award	Best Folk Album	Bonny Light Horseman	Nominated	
2021	Grammy Award	Best American Roots Performance	"Deep in Love"	Nominated	
2021	Libera Awards	Libera Award for Best Americana Record	Bonny Light Horseman	Won	
2021	Libera Awards	Best Breakthrough Artist	Bonny Light Horseman	Nominated	
2023	Grammy Award	Best American Roots Song	"Bright Star"	Nominated	
