= Matt Caplan =

American actor

- Matt Caplan after the final performance of American Idiot in Berkeley.
- Born: Matthew Caplan; New York City, New York, U.S.
- Occupations: Actor; musician
- Spouses: Karen Olivo (m. 2006; div. 2012) Rebecca Mozo (m. 2016)

Matt Caplan is an American actor and musician in the theatre.

== Career ==
Matt Caplan has released two studio albums and a single.

Caplan has appeared on Broadway in Rent as Mark Cohen, in the revival of South Pacific and in High Fidelity. He has also been featured in the films Across the Universe and Painting Abby Long, and on the television show New Amsterdam.

Caplan originated the role of Tunny in the stage adaptation of Green Day's American Idiot, which premiered at the Berkeley Repertory Theatre in Berkeley, California in September 2009. The show ended its run in Berkeley on November 15, 2009, and the role of Tunny was taken over by Stark Sands when the show moved to Broadway.

Caplan appeared in the original cast of the new Broadway musical Spider-Man: Turn Off the Dark, in many roles, among them, school bully Flash Thompson. He was also the understudy for Peter Parker/Spider-Man. After many delays and changes to the show, it officially opened June 14, 2011. Caplan exited the show January 29, 2012 and was replaced by Matthew Wilkas. After returning to cover Peter Parker/Spider-Man multiple times throughout 2012, he returned to the production officially on November 13, 2012, replacing Matthew James Thomas as the alternate for the role. He performed twice a week in place of lead actor Reeve Carney, until December 2 when Jake Epstein stepped into the part on December 4.

Aside from his roles on Broadway, Caplan has also done voice-over in English dubs of anime at NYAV Post.

== Personal life ==
Matt Caplan was born in New York and raised in Virginia Beach, Virginia. In high school, he studied theater at the Governor's School for the Arts, a magnet school in Virginia. As an adult, he returned to New York City to pursue an acting career. Caplan was previously married to actor Karen Olivo. He has been married to actress Rebecca Mozo since October 2016 and they currently reside in Los Angeles.

== Acting career ==
=== Theatre ===
Year	Production	Role	Notes
2002	Rent	Mark Cohen	Performances: Broadway (2002-August 6, 2006)
2006	High Fidelity	Guy with Mohawk; Barry; Rob	Performances: Broadway (Dec 07, 2006 - Dec 17, 2006)
2008	South Pacific	Bob McCaffery; Professor	Performances: Broadway (Apr 03, 2008 - Aug 22, 2010)
2009	American Idiot	Tunny	Original Berkeley Cast
2011	Spider-Man: Turn Off the Dark	Flash Thompson/Ensemble; Peter Parker/Spider-Man	Performances: Broadway (June 4, 2011 – January 29, 2012, November 13, 2012 – December 2, 2012)

=== Television ===
- New Amsterdam - Terry Walters (2008)
- NCIS - Marine Private Paul 'McCartney' Patterson (2012)
- Taken Away - Johnny (2014)
- Law & Order - Winston Barrett (2026)

=== Film ===
- Across the Universe - Dorm Buddy (2007)
- The Machine Girl - Takeshi (English dub) (2008)

=== Anime/Animation ===
- Ah! My Goddess - Keiichi Morisato
- Gokusen - Takeshi Noda
- Huntik: Secrets & Seekers - Lok Lambert (Season 2)
- Kurokami: The Animation - Raiga
- Midori Days - Seiji Sawamura
- Piano: The Melody of a Young Girl's Heart - Takizawa
- Samurai Deeper Kyo - Maki
- Shaman King - Faust VIII
- Shura no Toki: Age of Chaos - Baiken Shishito, Iori Miyamoto, Souji Okita

== Musical career ==
=== Studio albums ===
- Matt Caplan (2001)
- Overtones (2004)

=== Singles ===
- Odd Evensong (2009)
