= Spider-Man: Turn Off the Dark =

Musical by Bono and the Edge

- Promotional poster
- Music: Bono; The Edge
- Lyrics: Bono; The Edge
- Book: Julie Taymor; Glen Berger; Roberto Aguirre-Sacasa
- Basis: Spider-Man by: Stan Lee; Steve Ditko
- Premiere: June 14, 2011: Foxwoods Theatre, New York City
- Productions: 2011 Broadway

Spider-Man: Turn Off the Dark is a musical with music and lyrics by Bono and the Edge of Irish rock band U2 and a book by Julie Taymor, Glen Berger, and Roberto Aguirre-Sacasa. Based on the Marvel Comics character Spider-Man, the story incorporates elements of the 2002 film Spider-Man, the 2004 film Spider-Man 2 and the Greek myth of Arachne. It tells Spider-Man's origin story, his romance with Mary Jane Watson, and his battles with the Green Goblin. It includes highly technical stunts, such as aerial combat scenes and actors swinging from "webs".

The Broadway production was notorious for its many troubles. Several actors were injured performing stunts and the opening night was repeatedly delayed, causing some critics to review the "unfinished" production in protest. Following negative reviews, Spider-Man: Turn Off the Dark suspended performances for a month to retool the show. Aguirre-Sacasa, a longtime Spider-Man comics writer, was brought in to revise the story and book. The director, Julie Taymor, whose vision had driven the concept of the musical, was replaced by the creative consultant Philip William McKinley. By the time Spider-Man: Turn Off the Dark officially opened on June 14, 2011, it had set the record for the longest preview period in Broadway history, with 182 performances.

Critical reception of the opening was better than for the previews, but mixed, with praise for the visual effects but little enthusiasm for the book and score. Spider-Man: Turn Off the Dark is the most expensive Broadway production in history, with a budget of $75 million. Julie Taymor contested reports of the budget on the BBC Radio 4 program 'This Cultural Life' claiming that the production cost was overstated and instead comparable to the Shrek musical. In the week ending January 1, 2012, it held the box office record for Broadway sales in one week, taking in $2.941 million over nine performances, until it was beaten by Wicked at the end of the year, with $2.947 million. The production closed on January 4, 2014, at a massive financial loss.

== Description ==
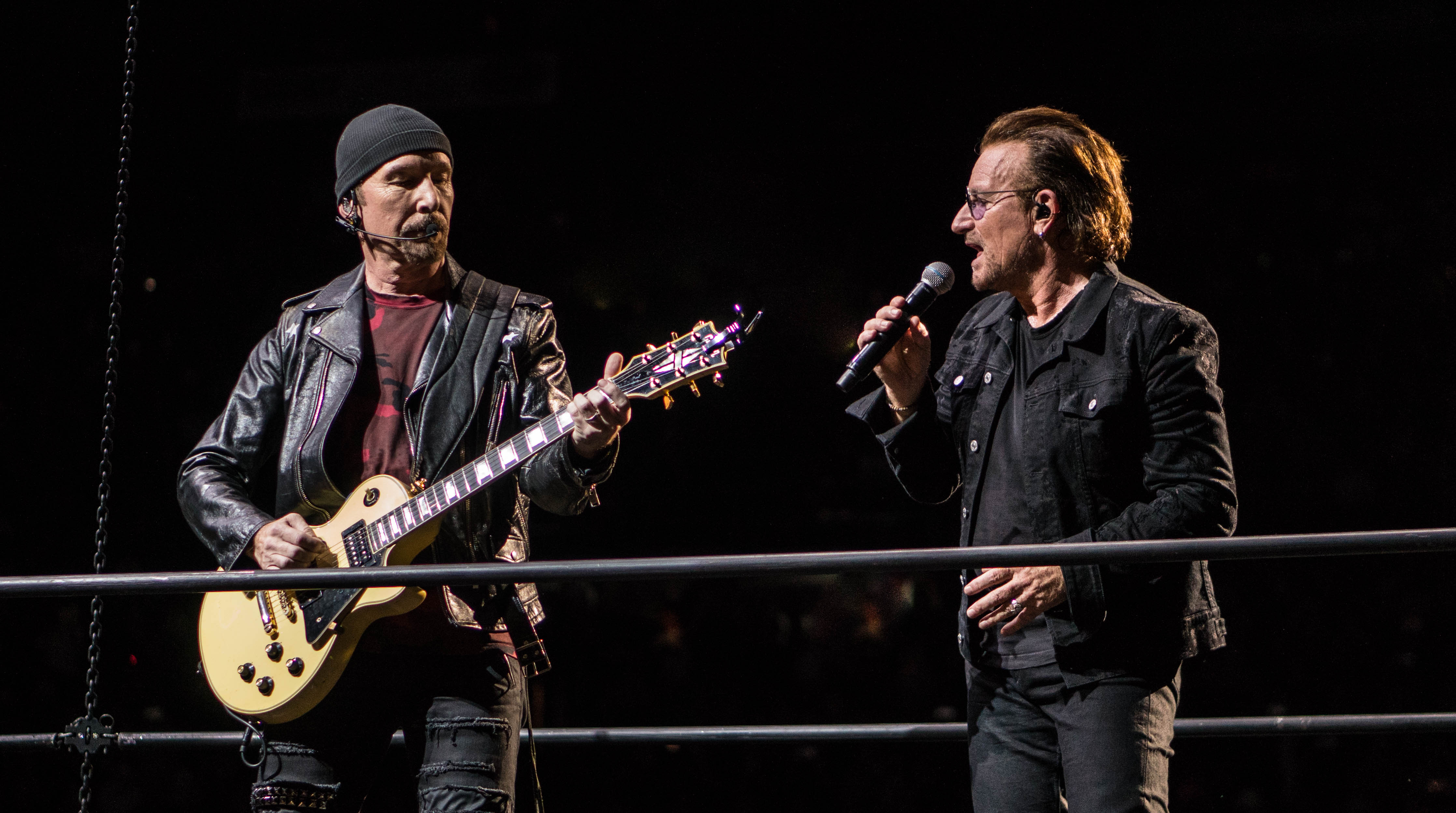
The Edge and Bono

Although often described as a rock musical, the production "treads new ground" that some commentators have asserted "have effectively distanced it from its peers—and caused some confusion when it comes time to describe the show." The Edge said he was unsure how to describe the production, saying it had elements of rock and roll, circus, opera and musical theater. Bono, admitting that his description is a little "pretentious", referred to it as "pop-up, pop-art opera", and said that the director, Julie Taymor, called it a "rock-and-roll circus drama". He said it dealt with "the same stuff" as Rilke, Blake, Wings of Desire, Roy Lichtenstein and the Ramones. 60 Minutes called it a "comic book rock opera circus," but in this segment, Bono noted that even using "rock" to describe the music is too narrow a description because "We've moved out of the rock and roll idiom in places into some very new territory for us ... [including] big show tunes and dance songs."

The production was described early on as "the most technically complex show ever on Broadway, with 27 aerial sequences of characters flying" and engaging in aerial combat. The production also includes a "multitude of moving set pieces that put the audience in the middle of the action," and enough projections onto giant screens that Bono has said that it is like a three-dimensional graphic novel. The original story treated the origins of Spider-Man similarly to the story in the 2002 film, but wove in an involved story about a villain based on the mythological Arachne. A "geek chorus" of four teenagers narrated the story. In the rewritten version, the plot hews closer to the comic book and film and trims and transforms the role of Arachne into a "kindred spirit in Spider-Man's dreams".

=== Broadway production ===
Spider-Man: Turn Off the Dark had no out-of-town tryouts because of the technical requirements of the production, which were designed for the Foxwoods Theatre on Broadway. The musical began previews at that theatre on November 28, 2010. After many delays, the official opening gala night took place on June 14, 2011.

The creative team originally included the director Taymor and the choreographer Daniel Ezralow, with scenic design by George Tsypin, costume design by Eiko Ishioka and lighting design by Donald Holder. An "expanded creative team", announced on March 9, 2011, includes Philip William McKinley, joining the production as "consultant" (when Taymor left the production). It also includes the addition of Chase Brock for additional choreography and Roberto Aguirre-Sacasa for additional writing. Taymor retained her original credits in Spider-Man.

The opening night cast featured Reeve Carney as Peter Parker/Spider-Man, Jennifer Damiano as Mary Jane Watson, Patrick Page as Norman Osborn/Green Goblin, T.V. Carpio as Arachne, Michael Mulheren as J. Jonah Jameson, Ken Marks as Uncle Ben, Isabel Keating as Aunt May, Jeb Brown as Mary Jane's Father, Matt Caplan as school bully Flash Thompson, and Laura Beth Wells as Osborn's wife Emily. Due to the physical demands of the role, Carney performed in six of the eight performances each week. The original alternate was British actor Matthew James Thomas, who left the show in November 2012 to star in Pippin.

On November 19, 2013, producers announced that the show would close on January 4, 2014, citing falling ticket sales and no longer being able to get injury insurance for the production as reasons for closure. Having run on Broadway for over three years, the production failed to make back its $75 million cost, the largest in Broadway history, with investors reportedly losing $60 million.

=== Canceled Las Vegas, national tour, and future productions ===
When announcing the show's closure on Broadway, it was announced the show would transfer to Las Vegas. The show's producer Michael Cohl said of the transfer, "We'll work on improving everything, It could be anything. It's a blank piece of paper."

In 2012, the musical's producers confirmed that they were scouting theatres in Europe, after the New York Post reported that they were considering productions in arenas in London and Hamburg.

On July 25, 2014, Cohl announced that the musical would set out on an arena tour in place of the previous announced production in Las Vegas and would launch in late 2015 or winter of 2016, but no such tour has since happened. Despite the show planned for the Vegas tour, Michael Cohl was quoted as saying: "Regarding the future of the "Spider-Man" musical property, Las Vegas was never a done deal; it's simply a market that we were exploring — among other possibilities — and still are."

== Plot ==
=== Act I ===
At Midtown High School in Queens, New York, local teenager Peter Parker gives a book report about Arachne, Goddess of the Weavers ("The Myth of Arachne"). As Peter gives his report, Arachne descends to the stage and tells the audience her story ("Behold and Wonder"). After class ends, Peter's enemy Flash Thompson and his friends gleefully torment the straight A student ("Bullying by Numbers"). Peter has a crush on his childhood friend Mary Jane Watson, but they both have unhappy lives ("No More"). Peter has lived with Uncle Ben and Aunt May ever since his parents Richard and Mary Parker died in a plane crash when he was a child, while Mary Jane endures abuse from her alcoholic father.

A few days later, Peter and his classmates go on a field trip to the genetics laboratory of scientist Norman Osborn and his wife Emily, who explain what they hope to accomplish with their genetic research ("D.I.Y. World"). While Peter takes pictures of the lab for the school newspaper, the Osborns lock down the lab as a dangerous genetically altered spider has escaped. While the students and scientists panic, the spider lowers itself onto Peter's shoulder and bites him ("Venom").

Peter soon becomes aware that, as a result of the spider's bite, he has spider-like powers along with a muscular physique, 20/20 vision and the ability to emit web strings from his wrists. He uses his powers at school to defeat Flash and his friends in a fistfight ("Bouncing Off the Walls"). After seeing Flash give Mary Jane a ride, Peter decides to buy a car to impress her. He enters a wrestling tournament and wins the grand prize of $1,000. Peter returns home only to learn that Uncle Ben has been shot by a thief. Arachne, who has been watching over Peter, encourages him to use his gift to defend the innocent from evil ("Rise Above"). Peter vows to avenge Uncle Ben's death by using his powers to save the world and notes that "with great power comes great responsibility".

Peter makes a costume and takes on the persona of "Spider-Man" ("NY Debut"). The Daily Bugle begins to publish articles about Spider-Man while Peter is hired by editor-in-chief J. Jonah Jameson as a freelance photojournalist. Meanwhile, Norman Osborn begins thinking that Spider-Man stole his research as the military organization Viper Worldwide presses him to accelerate his project ("Pull the Trigger"). Norman contemplates the dilemma with Emily while Peter shares his first romantic moment with Mary Jane ("Picture This"). Norman decides to experiment on himself, causing an electrical surge that results in Emily's accidental death. Norman goes insane and mutates into the "Green Goblin".

=== Act II ===
The Green Goblin comes up with a plan to genetically alter other humans as he did himself ("A Freak Like Me Needs Company"). Through his experiments on his former employees, he creates six villains: Carnage, Electro, Kraven the Hunter, Lizard, Swarm, and Swiss Miss. That night, Mary Jane tells Peter that her love for him has grown and he admits that the feeling is mutual ("If the World Should End"). The Goblin and his new alliance of criminals go on a rampage through New York ("Sinistereo"). Spider-Man quickly defeats the Sinister Six as the citizens of New York cheer him on ("Spider-Man!"), unaware that the Goblin has managed to escape. The Goblin arrives at the headquarters of the Daily Bugle and tells Jameson to print his plans of dominating the world through genetic mutation. The Goblin also tells Jameson that he gave Spider-Man life, making Jameson believe Spider-Man is in league with the Goblin. That night, Arachne comes to Peter in a vision and explains that she is his guardian, along with the reminder that being a hero is his inescapable destiny ("Turn Off the Dark").

Peter wants to spend more time with Mary Jane after missing the opening night of her play and considers taking time off from fighting crime. Upset over Peter's constant excuses, Mary Jane suggests they take a break from their relationship ("I Just Can't Walk Away (Say It Now)"). Peter gives his costume to J. Jonah Jameson, telling him that Spider-Man has quit. He takes Mary Jane to a night club and impulsively proposes to her. While there, the Green Goblin intercepts the city's TV signals and sends a message to Spider-Man threatening his loved ones. Peter takes Mary Jane to his apartment and breaks off their relationship for good so that his enemies won't target her. After telling Mary Jane that he will always love her, Peter takes a walk and realizes that he needs to be a hero not only for Mary Jane but for the world ("The Boy Falls From the Sky"). Spider-Man recovers his costume from the Daily Bugle and goes after the Green Goblin.

The Green Goblin sits at a piano at the top of the Chrysler Building and boasts to the audience of his plan to destroy New York City ("I'll Take Manhattan"). Spider-Man arrives and engages the Goblin in combat, but before he can finish him, the Goblin reveals that he has Mary Jane, who now dangles from the Chrysler Building. As they battle, Spider-Man webs the Green Goblin to his piano. The Green Goblin, not realizing this, thrusts the piano over the side of the Chrysler Building, taking him down to his death. After Spider-Man saves Mary Jane, she tells him not to leave and reveals that she has guessed who he is. Peter removes his mask and they embrace. The two contemplate their new life together before sirens begin wailing and Spider-Man swings away ("Finale: A New Dawn").

== Musical numbers ==
Act I:

- "Overture" – Orchestra
- "The Myth of Arachne" – Peter
- "Behold and Wonder" – Arachne, Weavers
- "Bullying by Numbers" – Peter, Bullies, High School Students
- "No More" – Peter, Mary Jane
- "D.I.Y. World" – Norman, Emily, Peter, High School Students, Lab Assistants
- "Venom" – Bullies
- "Bouncing Off the Walls" – Peter, High School Students
- "Rise Above" – Peter, Arachne, Citizens of New York
- "NY Debut" – Orchestra
- "Pull the Trigger" – Norman, Emily, Viper Executives, Soldiers
- "Picture This" – Peter, Mary Jane, Norman, Emily

Act II:

- "A Freak Like Me Needs Company" – Green Goblin, Sinister Six, Ensemble
- "If the World Should End" – Mary Jane, Peter
- "Sinistereo" – Reporters, Green Goblin, Sinister Six
- "Spider-Man!" – Citizens of New York, Spider-Man/Peter Parker, Jamerson, Aunt May, Mary Jane, Flash Thompson, Sinister Six.
- "Turn Off the Dark" – Arachne, Peter
- "I Just Can't Walk Away (Say It Now)" – Mary Jane, Peter
- "If the World Should End (Reprise) " -Mary Jane
- "The Boy Falls From the Sky" – Peter
- "I'll Take Manhattan" – Green Goblin
- "Finale: A New Dawn" (aka “Rise Above” (Reprise)) – Citizens of New York

== Casts and characters ==
Character(s)	Broadway
Character(s)	2011
Peter Parker/Spider-Man	Reeve Carney
Mary Jane Watson	Jennifer Damiano
Arachne	T. V. Carpio
Norman Osborn/Green Goblin	Patrick Page
J. Jonah Jameson	Michael Mulheren
Uncle Ben / Buttons / Others	Ken Marks
Aunt May / Mrs. Gribrock / Maxie	Isabel Keating
Flash Thompson / Bud / Others Peter Parker/Spider-Man u/s	Matt Caplan
Peter Parker/Spider-Man Alternate	Matthew James Thomas
Emily Osborn / Marbles / Others	Laura Beth Wells
MJ's Father / Stokes / Others Norman Osborn/Green Goblin u/s	Jeb Brown
Boyle / Robertson / Others	Dwayne Clark
Kong / Travis / Others	Luther Creek

=== Broadway cast replacements ===
- Mary Jane Watson: Rebecca Faulkenberry
- Arachne: Katrina Lenk
- Norman Osborn/Green Goblin: Robert Cuccioli
- Flash: Matthew Wilkas
- Alternate for Peter Parker/Spider-Man: Jake Epstein
- Peter Parker/Spider-Man understudies: Matthew Wilkas
- Arachne understudies: America Olivo
- Child Needing Saved: Jacob Belçher

== History ==
=== Early development ===
According to the New York Post, Bono began composing Spider-Man after Andrew Lloyd Webber joked, "I'd like to thank rock musicians for leaving me alone for 25 years – I've had the theater all to myself"; Bono and Taymor "decided to give Andrew a little competition".

In August 2002, Marvel announced that Tony Adams would produce a stage musical based on the Spider-Man comics. Adams approached Bono and the Edge to be involved with the project; in turn, they enlisted Taymor to direct. In October 2005, Adams suffered a stroke while the creative team was assembled to sign contracts; he died two days later. Patrick Healy in The New York Times described their situation:

Others might have abandoned the project, but the Spider-Man team decided to go on, with Mr. Adams's partner, David Garfinkle, as lead producer. An able entertainment lawyer, Mr. Garfinkle had little producing experience, and he ceded artistic decisions to Ms. Taymor, a perfectionist whose aesthetic included never repeating herself. Mr. Garfinkle did not take the tack that Disney had while working with Ms. Taymor on their hit musical, The Lion King: her genius flourishes best under supervision.

=== Delays and budget overruns ===
Readings of the musical were held beginning in 2007, but the production was delayed several times. By early 2009, the Broadway production ran $25 million into debt, the New York Post reported, and work on it was suspended. The budget for the project was reported in March 2009 to be a record-setting $52 million. On August 31, 2009, The Walt Disney Company announced plans to buy Marvel Comics. Despite the previous Broadway success of their Disney Theatrical Productions subsidiary, Disney made no move to assume control of Spider-Man, or help the production financially. In late 2009, Bono asked Michael Cohl to step in as producer, and by May 2010 Cohl had raised the money to proceed with the project, much of it from Jeremiah J. Harris, former Chairman of Live Nation, who is also listed as a producer. Meanwhile, the musical was eventually scheduled to open at the Foxwoods Theatre on February 18, 2010, but the production was delayed again until fundraising could be completed.

By November 2010, the production was estimated to cost $65 million. Previews began on November 28, 2010. The show's unusually high running costs were reported to be about $1 million per week. A new opening night of December 21, 2010 was scheduled, but this was delayed until January 2011, reportedly due to "a tremendous amount of creative commotion behind the scenes" as more time for rehearsals was needed. In December 2010, the official opening was again pushed back, to February 2011, "to provide more time for the creators to stage a new final number, make further rewrites to the dialogue and consider adding and cutting scenes and perhaps inserting new music. ... Ms. Taymor and the producers have concluded that Act II has storytelling problems that need to be fixed." A "final postponement" was made once again, pushing the opening to March 15, 2011, in order to "allow Taymor to fine-tune the production and instate a new ending".

The New York Times reported that the show's opening would be delayed for the sixth time, until summer 2011. This latest delay included a shutdown of previews. The shutdown lasted from April 19 to May 11, 2011, in order for the new creative team to implement changes; preview performances resumed May 12. In March, Cohl and Harris said they shut down previews because they felt "the story needed some work, the songs needed some work, and the sound needed some work", and that they "were going to concentrate on those three areas over the next three and a half weeks." They also announced that injured Spider-Man stunt performer Christopher Tierney would be rejoining the show. By April 2011 the capitalization was reported to have grown to $70 million, and as of the opening, it was reported as $75 million, compared to the typical $5 to $15 million for a Broadway musical. It included $9.7 million for sets and costumes, $4.4 million to rent the Foxwoods Theatre for two years before performances began, and $2.2 million for flying equipment. The weekly production budget was $1.3 million.

=== Cast and creative team replacements ===
My GOD, that was a lucky escape. Jesus Christ! Talk about dodging a bullet there!

— Alan Cumming, on his decision to leave the musical

Evan Rachel Wood and Alan Cumming were cast as Mary Jane Watson and the Green Goblin, respectively, in June 2009, but Wood left in March 2010 and Cumming the following month when the show was delayed. The new original cast was announced on August 16, 2010. During early previews Mat Devine, Gideon Glick, Jonathan Schwartz and T.V. Carpio (and later Alice Lee) played a group of characters known as the "Geek Chorus". After revisions, the characters were cut from the show.

In February 2011, playwright Roberto Aguirre-Sacasa was asked by the producers "to help rewrite the script". He had written several stories for Spider-Man comic books and had revised the book for a production of It's a Bird...It's a Plane...It's Superman. On February 21, 2011, Paul Bogaev (a 2004 nominee for a Tony Award for Best Orchestrations) was hired "as a consultant to help improve the performance, vocal and orchestration arrangements, and sound quality of the songs and numbers."

In early March 2011, Playbill and The New York Times reported that the producers had considered whether to "work with an expanded creative team" or have Taymor leave the production. Soon thereafter, Taymor left the production. Philip William McKinley joined the show as "consultant", and Chase Brock joined as an additional choreographer.

=== Cast injuries and additional replacements ===
[Joan Rivers] was there backstage to develop more material for her stand-up act, which lately has begun with a moment of silence for 'those Americans risking their lives daily – in 'Spider-Man' the musical'.

— The New York Times

Six people were injured while working on Spider-Man. After two stunt doubles were injured during various flying sequences in rehearsals, safety inspectors from the New York State Department of Labor reviewed these scenes in the show and, in February 2011, cited the show for two workplace safety violations. The United States Occupational Safety and Health Administration fined the show $12,600 in March 2011 for three serious safety violations. The Actors' Equity Association also looked into the incidents. One of the injuries occurred when Spider-Man stunt double Kevin Aubin broke both wrists. Another actor "had broken [his] feet on the same move a month earlier."

Natalie Mendoza, who was originally cast as Arachne, suffered a concussion during the first preview performance on November 28, 2010, when she was struck in the head by equipment in the wings. She did not report the accident to producers until November 30. She appeared in the second performance against her doctor's advice; the role involves several flying sequences, including one in which she is spun upside-down. Mendoza later felt ill, and America Olivo, her understudy, played the role during her nearly two-week absence. Mendoza returned to the show for the December 15 evening performance. Following the preview of December 20, 2010, when Spider-Man stunt performer Christopher Tierney was injured and hospitalized, Mendoza suspended her performance, Olivo again filling in for her. On December 30, she announced her permanent withdrawal from the show. She was replaced by T. V. Carpio, with Olivo remaining as understudy. When Carpio was injured in March 2011 and withdrew from the show for two weeks, Olivo performed the role again.

In that December 20 preview, Tierney fell 21 feet (6.4 m) off a piece of scenery when his harness was not connected to the safety cord, leaving him to freefall through the stage and into the orchestra pit. Tierney was hospitalized at Bellevue Hospital Center; he was released for rehabilitation on December 28. The December 20 performance was ended prematurely. After rehearsals for stricter safety procedures involving the harnesses, the show resumed with the evening performance on December 23. Tierney was released from New York University's Rusk Institute of Rehabilitation Medicine on January 5, 2011. He returned to the show for rehearsals on April 25, 2011, and performed in the show on opening night. Carpio was injured during a March 16 performance, reportedly hurting her neck, and left the show for two weeks.

On August 15, 2013, actor Daniel Curry (who was playing a villain, and was also a Spider-Man stunt double) was hurt by apparently being pinned under a piece of equipment and suffered leg trauma.

=== Promotion ===
==== Performances ====
On September 10, 2010, Carney and his band performed "Boy Falls from the Sky" on Good Morning America. Carney, Bono, and the Edge all performed on the May 25, 2011, final episode of American Idol Season 10 at the Nokia Theatre in Los Angeles, singing "Rise Above". Carney and Damiano performed "If The World Should End" on the 65th Tony Awards telecast in June 2011.

The show has twice appeared on Late Show with David Letterman. On March 2, 2011, the cast performed "Rise Above", as featured in Julie Taymor's version. On July 18, 2011, the cast, led by Patrick Page, performed "A Freak Like Me Needs Company".

A short performance of this show was featured in the 2011 Macy's Thanksgiving Day Parade, with Spider-Man battling villains, while the ensemble performed a medley of "Bouncing Off the Walls", "A Freak Like Me Needs Company", and "Spider-Man!".

==== Television ====
Syfy was Turn Off the Dark's lead media partner, offering tickets to the show as prizes and airing commercials for the production. CBS' 60 Minutes aired a feature on the production on November 28, 2010, the production's first preview performance, in which Lesley Stahl chronicled the creation of the musical.

== Reception ==
=== Press coverage and critical response ===
The show's first performance, on November 28, 2010. By January 18, 2011, a reviewer reported that there were no delays during the preview he saw. He praised the stunts and ballads "that evoke the yearning grandeur of U2 – though their more upbeat material tended to be nondescript" but felt that the "plot of the second act twisted into tangled knots." Radio and TV talk show host Glenn Beck championed the production after attending the preview showings several times.

Most of the major theater critics published their reviews of the first version on February 7, 2011; nearly all of them were strongly negative in tone. Although reviews during the preview period are unusual, the critics decided that the ever-expanding preview period was so long, and ticket prices were so high, that they should not wait for the official opening. An analysis in The New York Review of Books by classics scholar Daniel Mendelsohn followed up the complaints of other critics that Taymor's attempt to graft the classical myth of Arachne onto the comic book story turned the show into "a grotesque hybrid" and overloaded the plot with two unrelated main villains in Arachne and Green Goblin. Mendelsohn saw "a crucial difference between the ancient and modern models of human-to-animal metamorphosis. For today's audiences, such transformations are liberating — literally "empowering" – whereas for the ancients, they were, more often than not, humiliations, punishments for inappropriate or overweening behavior. ... At the heart of the Spider-Man disaster is the essential incompatibility of those two visions of physical transformation – the ancient and the modern, the redemptive and the punitive, visions that Taymor tried, heroically but futilely, to reconcile."

In a scathing review of the first version, The New York Times critic Ben Brantley had said that Spider-Man may "rank among the worst" Broadway musicals. In his review of the revised version, Brantley wrote, "So is this ascent from jaw-dropping badness to mere mediocrity a step upward? Well, until last weekend ... I would have recommended Spider-Man only to carrion-feasting theater vultures. Now, if I knew a less-than-precocious child of 10 or so, and had several hundred dollars to throw away, I would consider taking him or her to the new and improved Spider-Man."

In the show's first incarnation, the average rating from critics was "F+", while the revision garnered an average score of "C+". In a roundup of the reviews, Linda Buchwald commented, "critics actually miss some of Julie Taymor's ambition, crazy as they may have thought it at the time. Critics agree that the show is improved in that it makes much more sense, however, now they mostly find it a bore. Bono and the Edge's score is almost universally panned while Patrick Page's Green Goblin and stunning visuals remain for most critics the best reasons to see the show."

Theatre review aggregator Curtain Critic gave the production a score of 50 out of 100 based on the opinions of 20 critics.

=== Box office ===
Despite poor reviews and bad publicity, Spider-Man was at times successful at the box office. Ticket sales the day after the first preview on November 28, 2010, were more than one million dollars. During the first full week of 2011, Spider-Man had the highest box-office gross on Broadway, with a total of $1,588,514.

The New York Times' Patrick Healy stated in February 2011 that Spider-Man had become "a national object of pop culture fascination—more so, perhaps, than any show in Broadway history" due to media coverage and late-night comedians' monologues on the musical's many delays, injuries, and creative issues. He speculated that the musical would not have staying power through repeat viewings like other hit musicals, after "tourists and parents with children" watched it for "bragging rights at dinner parties or on the playground". The New York Post columnist Michael Riedel opined that month that the musical would be short-lived: "Depending on how much more money its backers are willing to lose, my hunch is that 'Spider-Man' will stagger through the spring, pick up with the tourist traffic in the summer and then collapse in the fall. It should be gone by September [2011]."

Spider-Man survived beyond September 2011, with ticket sales improving during the summer. About half of its audience came from beyond the New York metropolitan area, including many foreign tourists. In November, its producers stated that the show earned about $100,000 to $300,000 in net income each week, which means that Spider-Man would have had to continue playing for at least five years to recoup the $75 million cost. Producers discussed adding new scenes and perhaps a new song each year to persuade fans to attend it again as "a whole new [comic book] issue".

The first week of January 2012, the Broadway League reported that the show had taken in $2,941,790 in ticket sales the week before, the highest single-week gross of any show in the history of Broadway. The record was previously held by Wicked, which took $2.2 million in a week the previous year. Sales declined to $621,960, however, by the last week of September 2013. The show eventually closed at a "monumental financial loss" with John Kenrick noting that "Spider-Man Turn Off the Dark sold tickets, but rarely covered its ponderous weekly running cost."

=== In popular culture ===
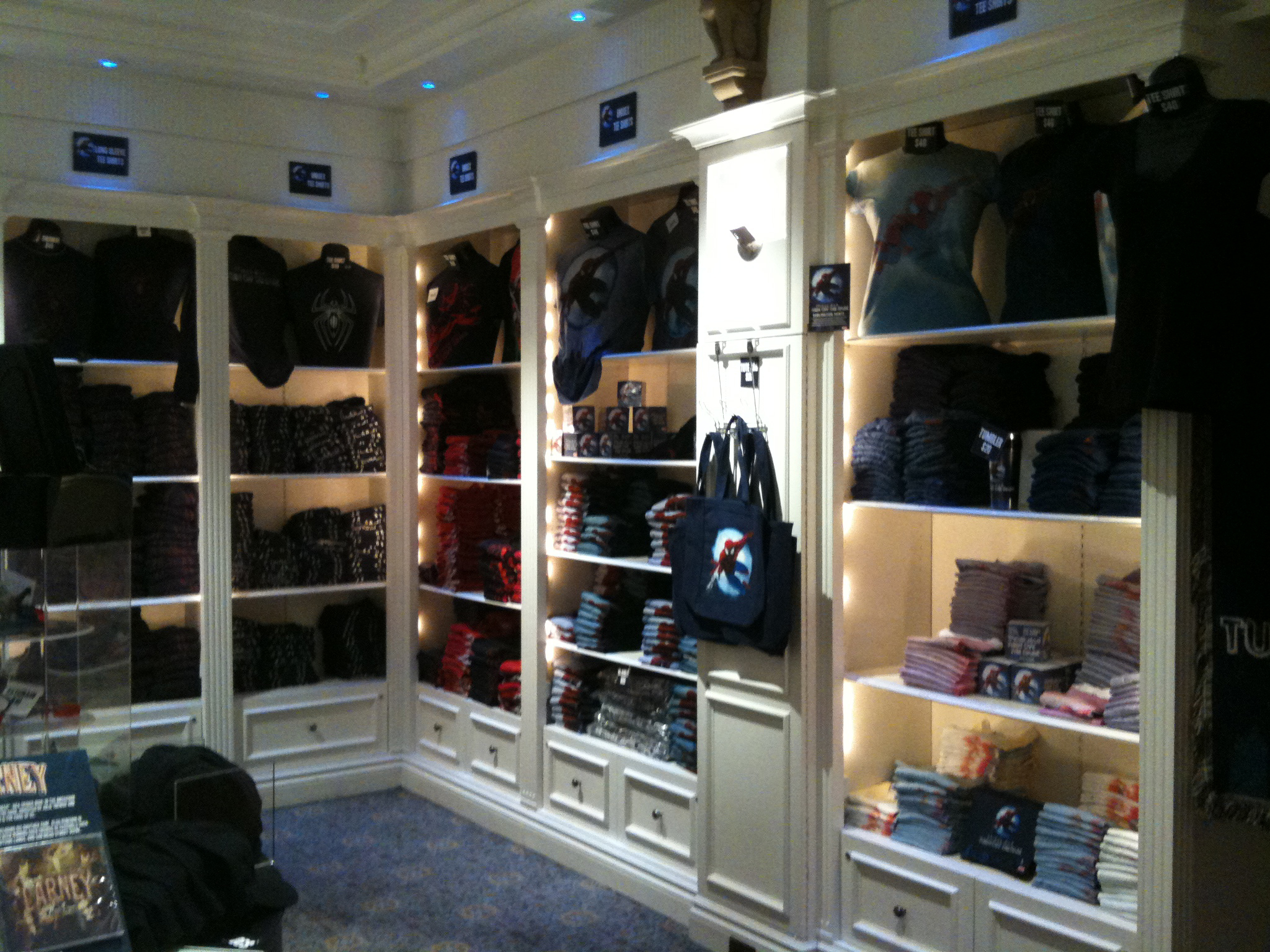
Merchandise from the show.

Spider-Man's troubled production history, particularly the frequent cast injuries, made the musical a common subject of parody and ridicule in other media.

- After the first preview performance, Conan O'Brien featured his own "preview" of the show, demonstrating how the show could have been more inexpensively produced, in ways that included using Silly String for web-slinging stunts.
- On the December 4, 2010 episode of Saturday Night Live, a Weekend Update segment featured Andy Samberg as "the fourth understudy" supposedly going on in place of the injured Spider-Man. Despite failing to do acrobatic flips on the spot, Samberg's character appears quite gung ho about playing in the role, telling anchor Seth Meyers, "It's a musical, Seth. It happens! You know how many people die every year doing Jersey Boys?"
- The February 12, 2011 episode of SNL featured a commercial parody for a fictional law firm called "Gublin and Green" that specializes in lawsuits related to Turn Off the Dark. Fred Armisen portrayed lawyer Frank Gublin in the ad.
- The cover of the January 17, 2011 New Yorker featured a cartoon, by Barry Blitt, showing multiple actors dressed as Spider-Man wearing casts or a head brace or in rehab.
- Sesame Street produced a YouTube skit in which Grover, playing "Spider-Monster," repeatedly slams into the show's sole audience member — his frequent customer in other sketches, Mr. Johnson.
- The Cartoon Network series MAD features a skit titled "Smallville: Turn Off the Clark", a mashup of the musical and the TV series Smallville. Along with the musical being directly mentioned, a recurring joke that occurs throughout the skit is Clark Kent repeatedly getting injured, a reference to the numerous injuries the actors faced during the musical's production.
- The South Park episode "Broadway Bro Down" features Randy Marsh putting on a Spider-Man costume and declaring, "It's time to put an end to Broadway once and for all!" He then proceeds to sabotage a performance of Wicked, swinging from a rope in the auditorium, knocking out performers and damaging the theater.
- In Ultimate Marvel vs. Capcom 3, Deadpool says that he will "rough [Spider-Man] up like a Broadway musical!" If victorious, he tells Spider-Man, "Maybe it would have helped if you turned off the dark!"
- In Unbreakable Kimmy Schmidt, the character of Titus Andromedon (portrayed by Broadway veteran Tituss Burgess) auditions for a fictitious sequel, entitled Spider-Man 2: Too Many Spider-Men!

Turn off the Dark, like many other Broadway shows, was parodied during the Tony Awards ceremony:

- During the 2010 Tonys, host Sean Hayes ran on stage dressed as Spider-Man, struggling comically to sing through the mask.
- At the 2011 Tonys, host Neil Patrick Harris rattled off as many jokes about the musical as he could in 30 seconds, squeezing in a couple more after the timer ended (e.g. "I sent Bono a congratulatory cable, but it snapped!").
- At the same 2011 Tonys, Bono and The Edge appeared on-stage to note that the show would formally (and finally) have its premiere the following week, though they joked about it being ineligible for consideration for that night's awards.

The musical, and in general the unusual ideal of a superhero-themed musical, has been the subject of indirect parodies:

- The May 23, 2011 episode of the animated sketch comedy Mad involved Julie Taymor approaching Clark Kent to cast him in Smallville: Turn Off the Clark.
- The February 3, 2013 episode of Robot Chicken contains a sketch titled "Avengers: Musictacular Tapstravaganza", featuring musical numbers sung by Thor, Black Widow, Hawkeye, Loki, and Iron Man, a dance number by Captain America, and a large animatronic Hulk.

When running for Congress in 2021, George Santos contended that he worked as a producer on the musical. Show producer Michael Cohl brushed off the claim, noting to Bloomberg that Santos had never worked on the show nor did his name appear on its playbills.

Swiss Miss, an original character created by Taymor and Berger for the show's Sinister Six, makes a brief visual cameo in Spider-Man: Across the Spider-Verse as a prisoner in Spider-Society' headquarters. Producer Phil Lord confirmed her inclusion via Twitter.

In December 2023, a screenplay about the troubled production of the musical, Boy Falls From Sky by Hunter Toro, was included on The Black List, an annual survey of the "most-liked" motion picture screenplays not yet produced.

== Recordings ==
A Broadway concept album, produced by Steve Lillywhite, was released on June 14, 2011. On May 25, 2011, a single version of "Rise Above", titled Rise Above 1: Reeve Carney Featuring Bono and the Edge, was released digitally. The music video was released on July 28, 2011 and for the Billboard chart week of August 13, 2011 the single debuted on the Adult Top 40 chart at position 40, and peaked at position 34. On the Billboard Hot 100, the single peaked at position 74.

Jon Dolan for Rolling Stone gave the album a three stars rating out of five commenting: "Amid the all many disasters that beset the Broadway version of Spider-Man, Bono and the Edge's songs emerge pretty much unscathed by critics. Now that the show has been revised and restaged, this centerpiece anthem of struggle over adversity may become a metaphor for its slog towards redemption. "Rise Above" is a trademark soaring U2 ballad, with the elegant grandeur cranked up to Andrew Lloyd Webber levels. But show tunes need big voices too, and, singing next to Bono on this version from the forthcoming cast recording album, leading man Reeve Carney sounds like a nervous understudy." Stephen Thomas Erlewine of Allmusic gave the album one star, stating that all the problems that plagued the production "obscured one key problem with the musical: the songs written by Bono and the Edge are dreadful." Erlewine summed up his review calling the songs a "murky, turgid mess, too concerned with atmosphere and narrative to reel in a listener and ironically not offering ambience or story enough to suggest that the musical would entertain."

The concept album features alternate orchestrations and arrangements not featured in the Broadway productions and omits a number of songs including "The Myth of Arachne", "Behold and Wonder", "Bullying by Numbers", "Venom", "Spider-Man!", "I'll Take Manhattan" and the finale "A New Dawn".

=== Cast album ===
Spider-Man: Turn Off the Dark

Soundtrack album cast recording by Various
- Released: June 14, 2011
- Length: 51:35
- Label: Interscope

No.	Title	Length
1.	"NY Debut (Instrumental)"	3:10
2.	"The Boy Falls from the Sky"	4:27
3.	"Rise Above 1"	3:53
4.	"Picture This"	3:38
5.	"I Just Can't Walk Away (Say It Now)"	3:26
6.	"Bouncing Off the Walls"	2:59
7.	"Pull the Trigger"	4:01
8.	"No More"	3:45
9.	"D.I.Y. World"	2:56
10.	"If the World Should End"	3:46
11.	"Sinistereo"	3:17
12.	"A Freak Like Me (Needs Company)"	3:41
13.	"Rise Above 2"	4:22
14.	"Turn Off the Dark"	4:06

== Awards and nominations ==
=== Original Broadway production ===
Year	Award ceremony	Category	Nominee	Result
2012	Tony Award	Best Costume Design	Eiko Ishioka	Nominated
2012	Tony Award	Best Scenic Design	George Tsypin	Nominated
2012	Drama Desk Award	Outstanding Featured Actor in a Musical	Patrick Page	Nominated
2012	Outer Critics Circle Award	Outstanding New Broadway Show		Nominated
2012	Outer Critics Circle Award	Outstanding Featured Actor in a Musical	Patrick Page	Nominated
2012	Outer Critics Circle Award	Outstanding Costume Design	Eiko Ishioka	Won
2012	Outer Critics Circle Award	Outstanding Set Design	George Tsypin	Won
2012	Outer Critics Circle Award	Outstanding Lighting Design	Donald Holder	Nominated

== See also ==
- Spider-Man Live!
- Rogers: The Musical
- Marvel Universe Live!
