= Iosef Yusupov =

American set designer

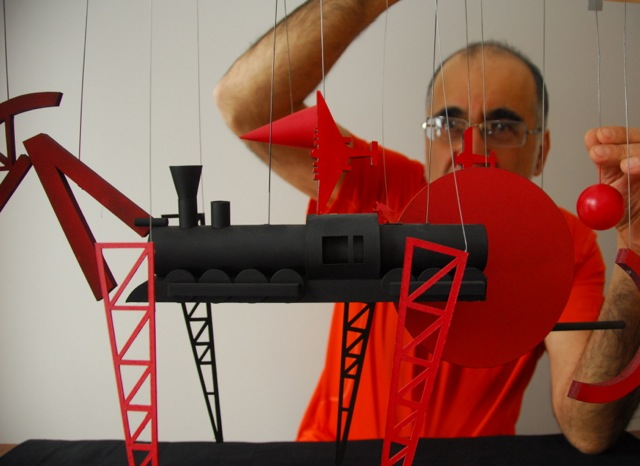
Iosef Yusupov working on the 20th Century avante-guard model for the 2014 Olympic Opening Ceremony

Iosef Yusupov is an American set designer who was one of the scenic designers for the George Tsypin creative team of the 2014 Winter Olympics opening ceremony in Sochi, Russia. Currently living in the United States, he has designed many shows (plays, operas and TV) in New York City and has worked motion pictures as a scenic artist. His sets that he builds create an illusion of 3-dimensions, with 2-dimensional material.

== Biography ==
Yusupov was the eldest son of five, born in Samarkand, Uzbekistan to Ifraim Cohen-Yusupov, a descendant of Rabbi Yosef ben Moshe Mammon (Maimon) Maravi. After Yusupov graduated from the Saint Petersburg Institute of Theater, Music, and Cinematography, he went on to design sets in Russia and Eastern Europe. He received the State Prize of the USSR for the Arts for help in the production of Oedipus Rex at the Tadzhik Lakhuti Academic Drama Theater. When he moved to the United States, he met George Tsypin and has worked for him intermittently as an assistant since the early 1990s. Yusupov has also worked with directors Yefim Maizel, Rosemary Andress and Andrew Paul.

== Theatrical Productions ==
- Rat in the Skull by Ron Hutchinson - Set Designer. October 1991. 29 Repertopy Theater Co, NY
- Hansel and Gretel by Brothers Grimm - Set Designer. November 1991. Queens Theater in the Park, NY
- Shpinnen un Shpinnen by Beverly Taylor - Set Designer. June 1995. Theater for the New City, NYC
- The Singer of His Majesty by Ilyas Mallaeva - Set Designer. February 2003. Queens Theater in the Park, NY
- Julius Caesar by William Shakespeare - Set Designer. April 2007. Pittsburgh Irish and Classical Theatre at Stephen Foster Memorial, Oakland, PA
- Point Park's The Snow Queen by Hans Christian Andersen - Set Designer. Dec 2008. Pittsburgh Playhouse, Oakland, PA
