= The Edge =

Irish and Welsh rock musician, U2 guitarist (born 1961)

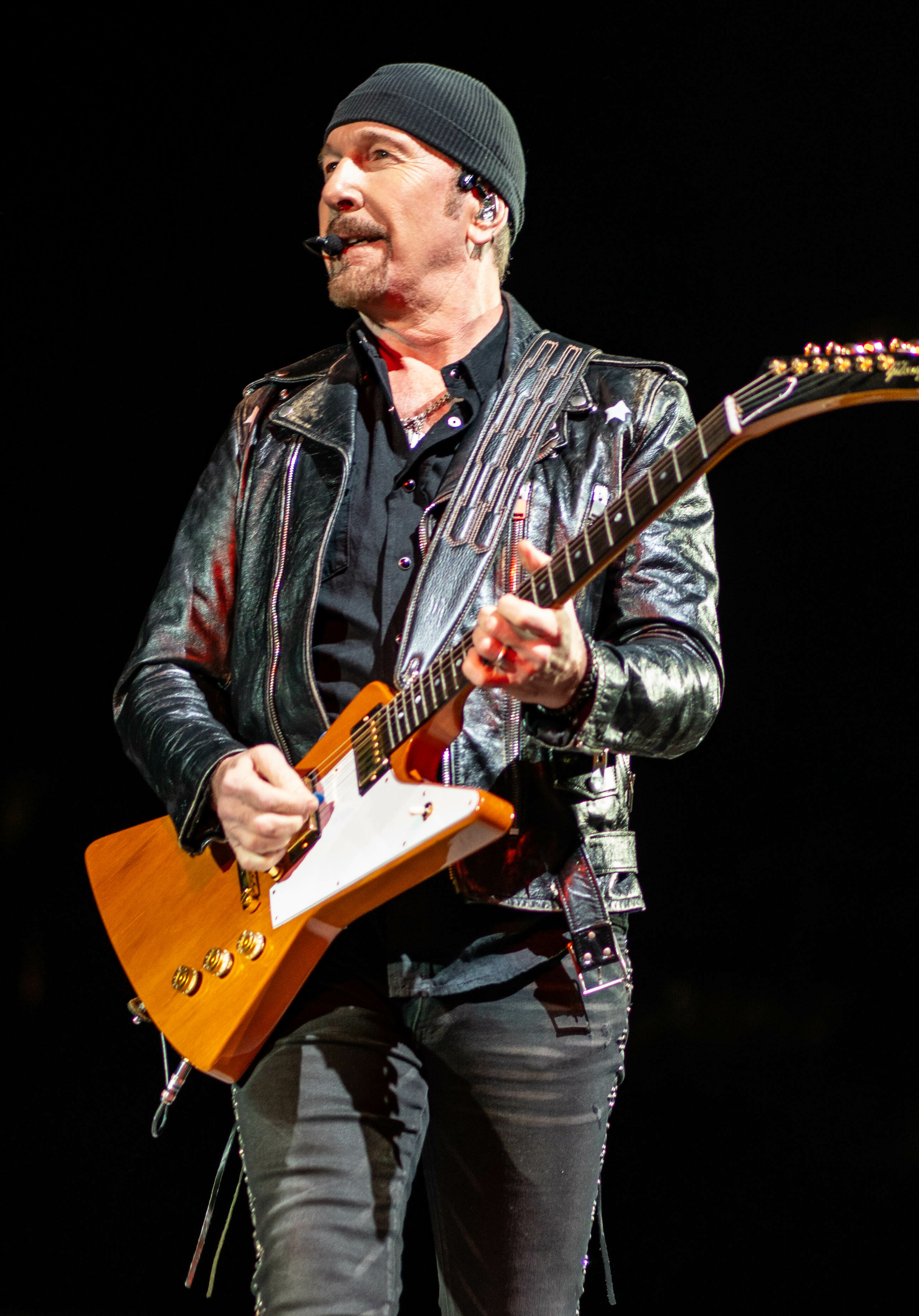
- The Edge performing in 2019

Background information
- Born: David Howell Evans; 8 August 1961 (age 65); Barking, Essex, England
- Origin: Dublin, Ireland
- Genres: Rock; alternative rock; pop rock; post-punk
- Occupations: Musician; singer; songwriter
- Instruments: Guitar; keyboards; vocals
- Years active: 1976–present
- Labels: Island; Interscope; Mercury; CBS Ireland
- Member of: U2
- Spouses: Aislinn O'Sullivan (m. 1983; div. 1996) Morleigh Steinberg (m. 2002)

David Howell Evans (born 8 August 1961), known by his stage name the Edge or simply Edge, is an Irish and British musician, singer, and songwriter. He is best known as the lead guitarist, keyboardist, and backing vocalist of the rock band U2. A member of the group since its inception, he has recorded 15 studio albums with them as well as one solo record. His understated style of guitar playing, a signature of U2's music, is distinguished by chiming timbres, use of rhythmic delay, drone notes, harmonics, and an extensive use of effects units.

Born in England to Welsh parents and raised in Ireland, the Edge formed the band that would become U2 with his classmates at Mount Temple Comprehensive School and his elder brother Dik in 1976. Inspired by the ethos of punk rock and its basic arrangements, the group began to write its own material. They eventually became one of the most successful acts in popular music, with albums such as 1987's The Joshua Tree and 1991's Achtung Baby. Over the years, the Edge has experimented with various guitar effects and introduced influences from several genres of music into his own style, including American roots music, industrial music, and alternative rock. With U2, the Edge has also played keyboards, produced their records Zooropa (1993) and Songs of Surrender (2023), and occasionally served as co-lyricist. The Edge met his second wife, Morleigh Steinberg, through her collaborations with the band.

As a member of U2 and as an individual, the Edge has campaigned for human rights and philanthropic causes. He co-founded Music Rising, a charity to support musicians affected by Hurricane Katrina. He has collaborated with U2 bandmate Bono on several projects, including songs for Roy Orbison, Tina Turner, and Martin Garrix, and the soundtracks to the musical Spider-Man: Turn Off the Dark and the Royal Shakespeare Company's London stage adaptation of A Clockwork Orange. As a member of U2, the Edge has won 22 Grammy Awards and has been inducted into the Rock and Roll Hall of Fame. Several music publications have ranked the Edge among the greatest guitarists of all time.

== Early life ==
David Howell Evans was born on 8 August 1961 at the Barking Maternity Hospital in Barking, Essex, the second child of Welsh parents Garvin and Gwenda Evans. Both of his parents were from Llanelli. His father was an engineer who worked for the local electricity board, and subsequently worked for the electronics company Plessey. Evans has an elder brother called Richard (often called Dik) and a younger sister called Gillian, and is a cousin of actress Juliet Aubrey. The family initially lived in Chadwell Heath. Around 1962, Garvin was offered a promotion which took the family to Dublin. During his childhood in Dublin, Evans talked in two different accents, using a Welsh accent at home and an Irish accent whenever he was outside. He later said, "The reason for this dual identity was mainly to be understood by my peers but also to be accepted." He later commented that there were times of frustration for him growing up in a Catholic country, and this may have played a part in his musical development. Evans has retained his British citizenship into adulthood.

The Edge received his initial formal education at St. Andrew's National School in Malahide. As a child, he also received piano and guitar lessons and practised music with Dik. He received his first guitar at the age of seven when his mother bought him a Spanish guitar. He did not know how to properly tune it or hold it and referred to it as "little more than a toy", but he was fascinated by how cool it was. At the age of nine, the "first proper guitar" came to the Evans household when his mother purchased an old acoustic guitar at a jumble sale for a pound. He and Dik both experimented with this instrument, replacing the rusty wire strings with nylon ones and learning to play it properly. The Edge said in 1982 of this early experimentation, "Me and my elder brother Dik both played it, plonking away, all very rudimentary stuff, open chords and all that."

== Musical career ==
=== U2 ===
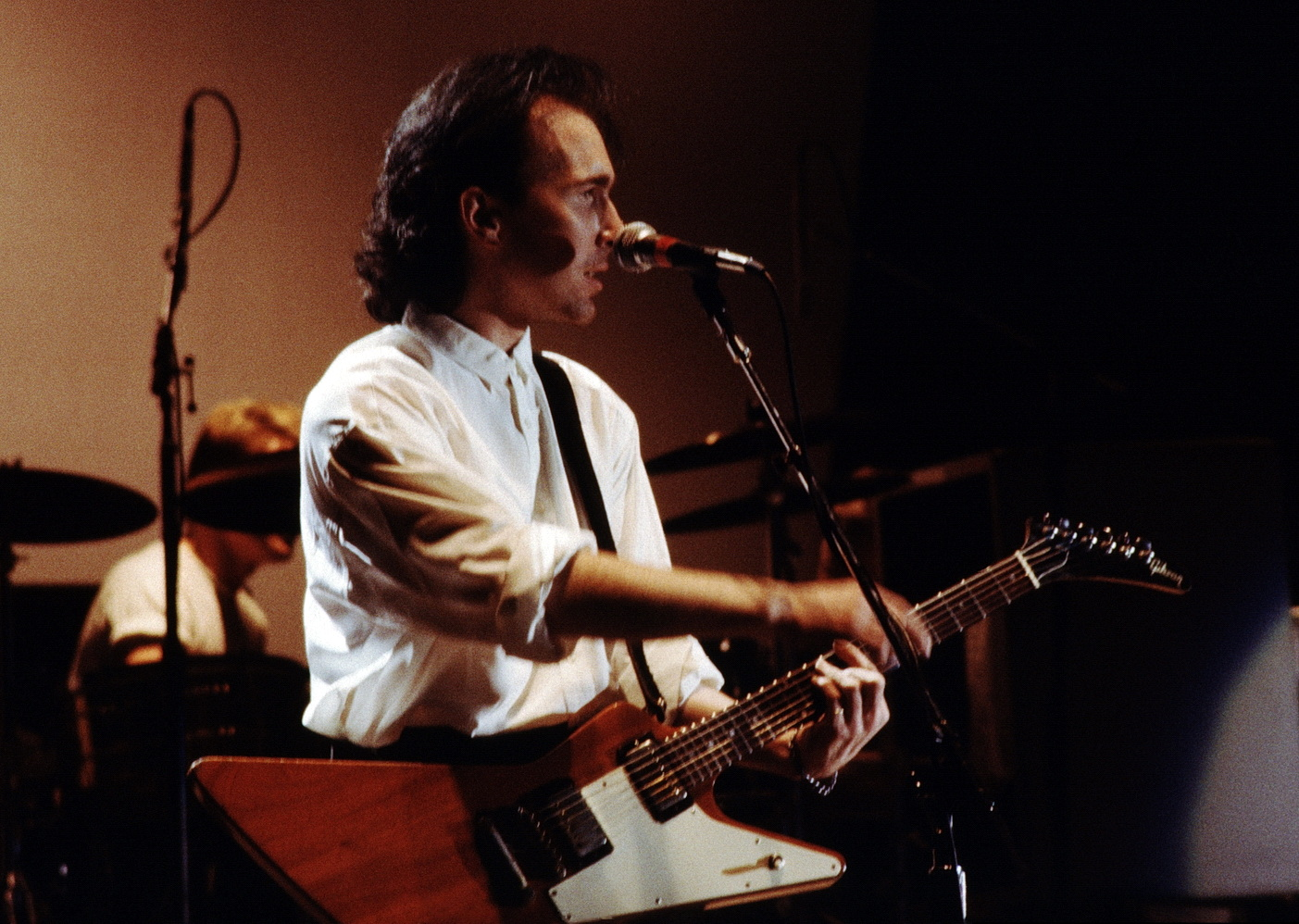
The Edge performing with U2 in Norway in January 1985

While the Evans brothers were at Mount Temple Comprehensive School in Dublin in 1976, they went along to a meeting in response to an advert posted by another pupil, Larry Mullen Jr., on the school's noticeboard seeking musicians to form a new band with him. Among the several other pupils who also responded to the note were Paul "Bono" Hewson and Adam Clayton. The band went through a number of reformations before becoming known as U2 in March 1978 (Richard Evans having left before this to join another band, leaving his younger brother as the lead guitarist).

Early in the band's career, Evans was given the nickname "the Edge" by members of the Lypton Village surrealist street gang to which Bono belonged. The nickname is commonly believed to be derived from the angular shape of Evans' head. However, the origin of the name is disputed and other theories include a description of his guitar playing and his preference for not becoming fully involved and therefore remaining on the edge of things.

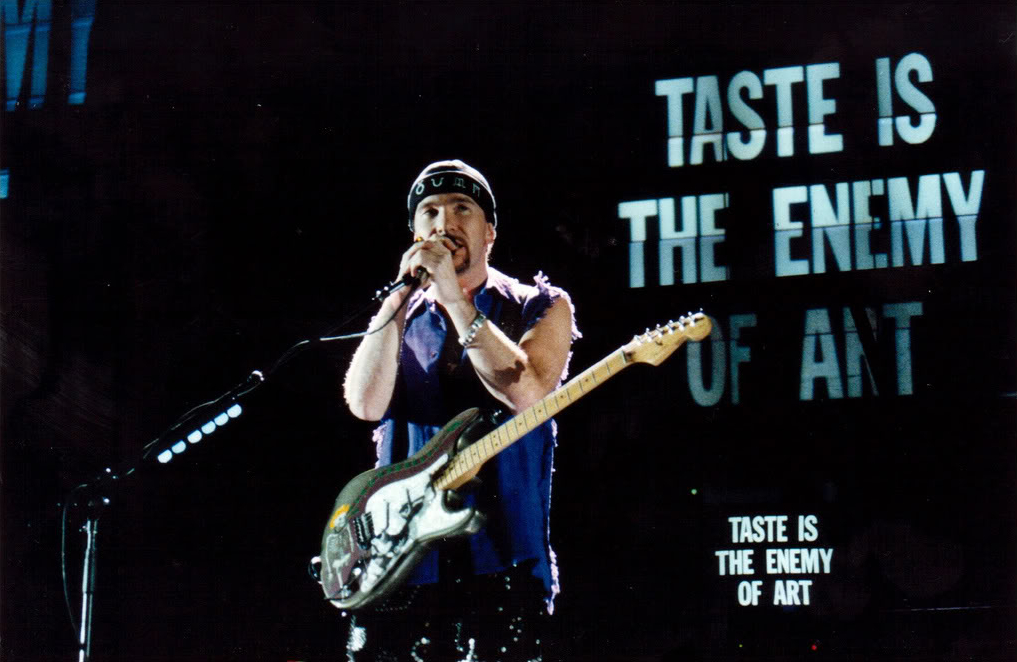
The Edge performing during the Zoo TV Tour in 1993

U2 began its public performance life in small venues in Dublin in 1977, occasionally playing at other venues elsewhere in Ireland. In December 1979, they performed their first concerts outside Ireland, in London, and in 1980 began extensive touring across the British Isles, developing a following. Their debut album Boy was released in 1980.

In 1981, leading up to the October Tour, the Edge came very close to leaving U2 for religious reasons, but he decided to stay. During this period, he became involved with a group called the Shalom Fellowship, with which Bono and Mullen were also involved. Shortly after deciding to remain with the band, he wrote a piece of music that later became "Sunday Bloody Sunday".

The Edge received his first production credit on the band's 1993 album Zooropa for the extra level of responsibility he assumed in its creation.

In 2024, the Edge co-directed V-U2 An Immersive Concert Film with his wife Morleigh Steinberg. The film documents U2's 2023–2024 concert residency U2:UV Achtung Baby Live at Sphere and will screen exclusively at Sphere.

=== Other musical projects ===
In addition to his regular role within U2, the Edge has also recorded with such artists as Johnny Cash, B. B. King, Tina Turner, Ronnie Wood, Jah Wobble, Holger Czukay, Jay-Z, and Rihanna. Through his working relationships with producers Brian Eno and Daniel Lanois, the Edge connected with Michael Brook (the creator of the infinite guitar) and collaborated with him on the score to the film Captive (1986). The soundtrack included the song "Heroine", the vocal of which was co-written and sung by a young Sinéad O'Connor. Larry Mullen Jr played drums on the track.

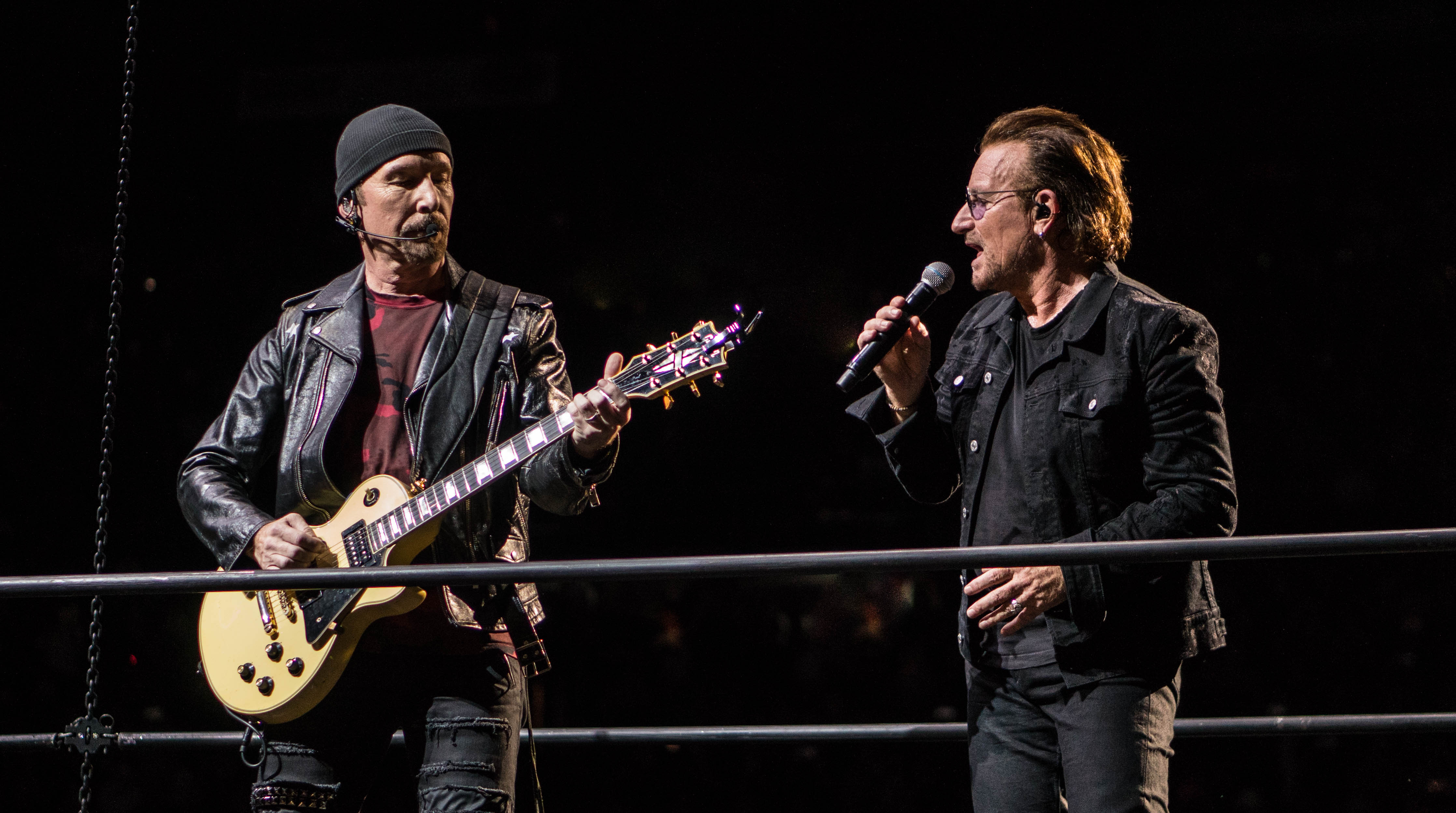
The Edge and bandmate Bono have collaborated musically outside of U2

The Edge has collaborated with U2 bandmate Bono on numerous musical projects outside of the group. They wrote the musical score for the Royal Shakespeare Company's London stage adaptation of A Clockwork Orange, which opened in 1990. The duo also wrote the eponymous theme song of the 1995 James Bond film GoldenEye, which was performed by Tina Turner. The Edge and Bono ventured into theatre again when they composed the music and lyrics for the musical Spider-Man: Turn Off the Dark, which opened in 2011. A single titled "Rise Above 1" by Reeve Carney, featuring Bono and the Edge, was released digitally from the musical's soundtrack. The music video was released on 28 July 2011. The Edge and Bono collaborated with Dutch DJ Martin Garrix on the song "We Are the People", which served as the official song of the UEFA Euro 2020 tournament and was released on 14 May 2021.

The Edge wrote the theme song for seasons one and two of The Batman, which aired in 2004 and 2005 respectively.

In 2008, the Edge participated in the Davis Guggenheim-directed documentary film It Might Get Loud. The film examines the history of the electric guitar, focusing on the careers and styles of the Edge, Jimmy Page, and Jack White. The film premiered on 5 September 2008 at the Toronto International Film Festival

On 29 April 2016, the Edge performed in the Sistine Chapel as part of a conference for the Angiogenesis Foundation, making him the first rock artist to stage a concert at the site.

In 2023, the Edge was a guest musician on the songs "Train with No Station" and "Noche Oscura" for the album Los Angeles by Lol Tolhurst, Budgie, and Jacknife Lee.

== Musical style ==
"Notes actually do mean something. They have power. I think of notes as being expensive. You don't just throw them around. I find the ones that do the best job and that's what I use. I suppose I'm a minimalist instinctively. I don't like to be inefficient if I can get away with it. Like on the end of 'With or Without You'. My instinct was to go with something very simple. Everyone else said, "Nah, you can't do that." I won the argument and I still think it's sort of brave, because the end of 'With or Without You' could have been so much bigger, so much more of a climax, but there's this power to it which I think is even more potent because it's held back... ultimately I'm interested in music. I'm a musician. I'm not a gunslinger. That's the difference between what I do and what a lot of guitar heroes do."

— The Edge in 1991

=== Guitar playing ===
The Edge's style of playing guitar is distinguished by his chiming timbres, echoing notes, sparse voicings, and extensive use of effects units. He favours the perfect fifth interval and often plays power chords, which are chords consisting of just the fifth and root notes and that eliminate the third. This style is not explicitly in a major or minor key but implies both, creating a musical ambiguity. For these chords, he often plays the same notes on multiple strings, some of which are left open, creating an Irish-influenced drone. Against this drone, he changes other notes to imply a harmony. Among the Edge's signature techniques are playing arpeggios, sixteenth note percussive strumming, and harmonics, the latter of which he described as "so pure and finely-focused that [they have] the incredible ability to pierce through [their] environment of sound, just like lightning". Author Henrik Marstal said that his use of harmonics and chiming timbres "emulates the concept of bell ringing" and "embod[ies] a spiritual dimension".

The Edge takes a relatively understated approach to guitar playing, viewing notes as "expensive" and preferring to play simple parts that best serve their song. He eschews virtuosity in favour of "atmospherics, subtlety, minimalism, and clever signal processing", according to Guitar Player. Rather than emulate common playing styles, the Edge is interested in "tearing up the rule book" and finding new ways to approach the instrument; he was inspired by guitarists such as Tom Verlaine of Television, Keith Levene of Public Image Ltd, and John McKay of Siouxsie and the Banshees, who he thought "were all playing the instrument in a fresh way". The Edge also cited guitarists such as John McGeoch, Rory Gallagher, and Patti Smith as some of his strongest influences.

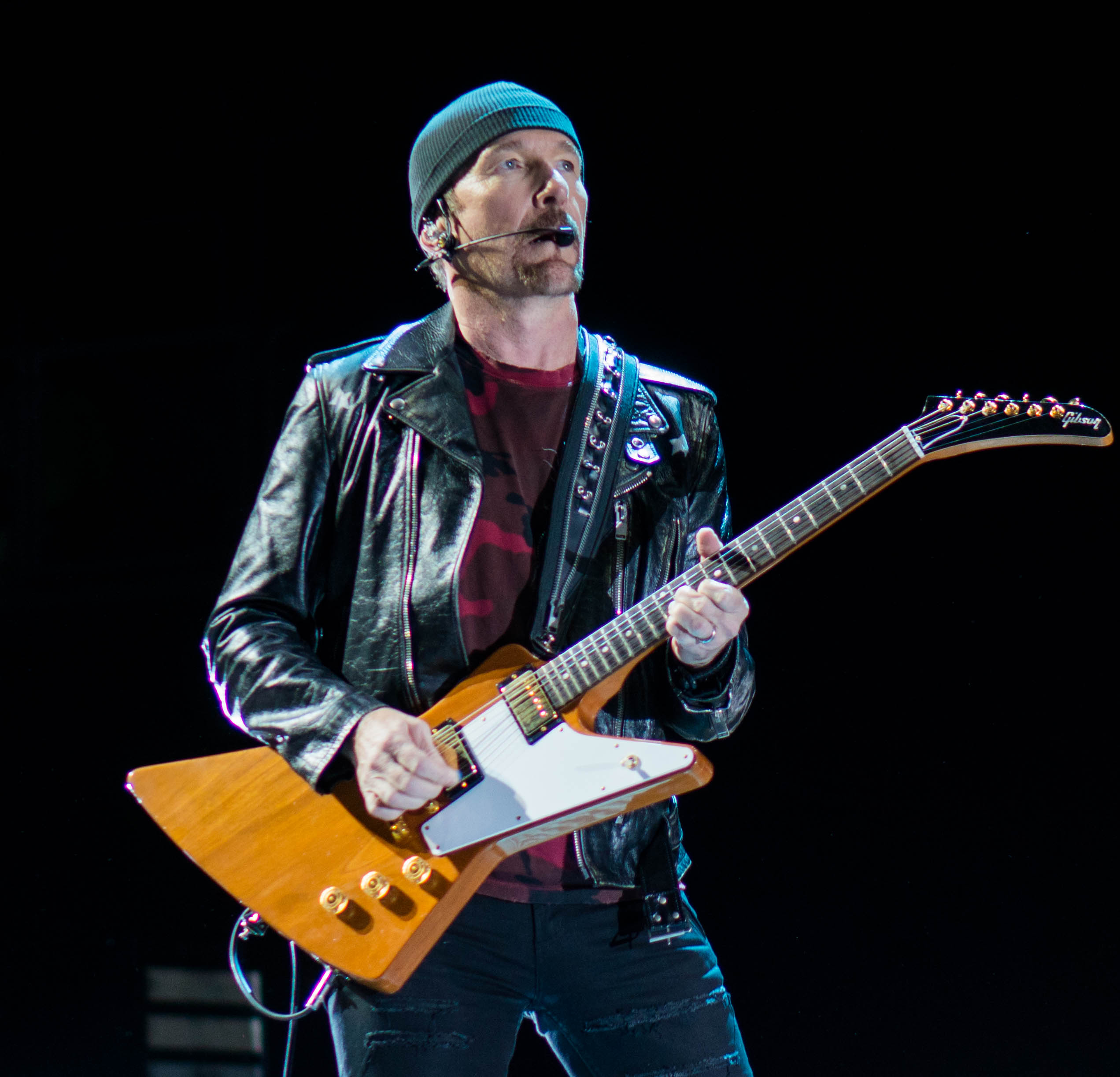
The Edge playing his signature guitar, the Gibson Explorer

The Edge's guitar sound is frequently modulated with a delay set to a dotted eighth note for rhythmic effect. After acquiring his first delay pedal, the Electro-Harmonix Memory Man, he became fascinated with how to use its return echo to "fill in notes that [he's] not playing, like two guitar players rather than one". The effect unit became a mainstay in his guitar rig and had a significant impact on the band's creative output. The Edge became known for his extensive use of effects units, and for his meticulous nature in crafting specific sounds and guitar tones from his equipment choices. Led Zeppelin guitarist Jimmy Page called him a "sonic architect", while Neil McCormick described him as an "effects maestro". Critics have variously referred to the Edge's guitar sounds as evoking the image of fighter planes on "Bullet the Blue Sky", resembling a "dentist's drill" on "Love Is Blindness", and resembling an "airplane turbine" on "Mofo". The Edge said that rather than using effects merely to modify his sound, he uses them to spark ideas during his songwriting process.

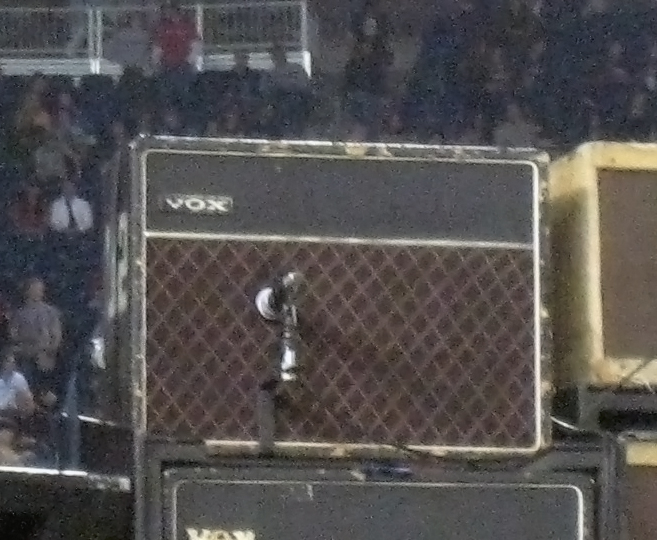
The Edge's Vox AC30 amp during a U2 concert

The Edge developed his playing style during his teenage years, partially as a result of him and Mullen trying to accommodate the "eccentric" bass playing of Clayton by being the timekeepers of the band. In their early days, the Edge's only guitar was his 1976 Gibson Explorer Limited Edition, which became a signature of the group. However, he found the sound of the Explorer's bass strings unsatisfactory and avoided them in his playing early on, resulting in a trebly sound. He said by focusing "on one area of the fretboard [he] was developing a very stylized way of doing something that someone else would play in a normal way". Other equipment choices contribute to the Edge's unique sound. His 1964 Vox AC30 "Top Boost" amplifier (housed in a 1970s cabinet) is favoured for its "sparkle" tone, and is the basis for his sound both in the studio and live. The Edge has also used plectrums manufactured by the German company Herdim that he turns sideways or upside down so the dimpled grip strums against the strings, resulting in a "rasping top end" to his guitar tone.

About his playing style, the Edge said in 1982:

I like a nice ringing sound on guitar, and most of my chords I find two strings and make them ring the same note, so it's almost like a 12-string sound. So for E I might play a B, E, E and B and make it ring. It works very well with the Gibson Explorer.

=== Vocals ===
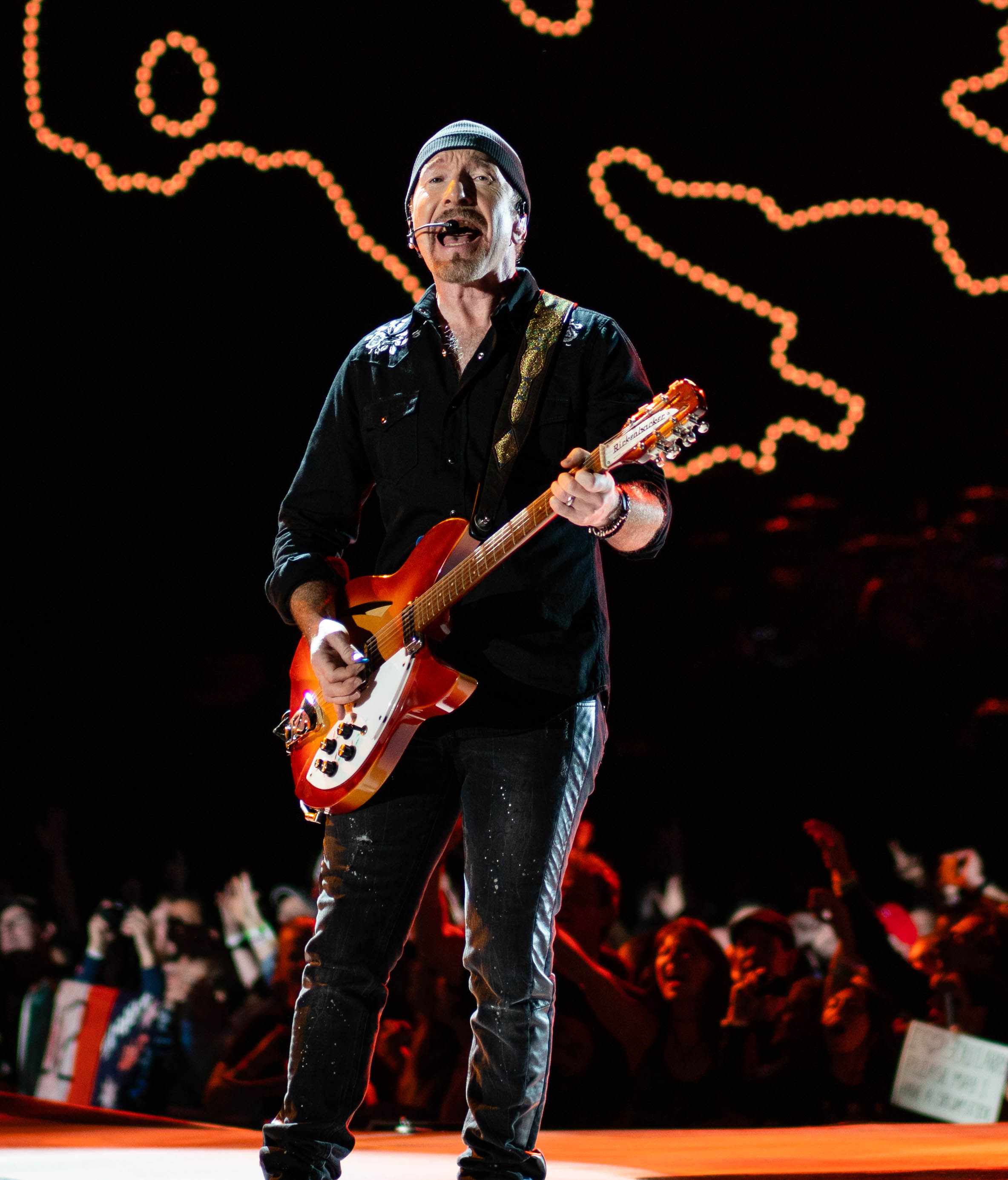
The Edge singing backing vocals into a headset microphone in 2019 while playing a Rickenbacker

The Edge provides the backing vocals for U2. Their 1983 live album and video release, Under a Blood Red Sky and U2 Live at Red Rocks: Under a Blood Red Sky are good reference points for his singing (as are the live DVDs from the Elevation Tour, U2 Go Home: Live from Slane Castle and Elevation 2001: Live from Boston). For example, he sings the chorus to "Sunday Bloody Sunday" (Bono harmonises on the final 'Sunday'). U2 used this tradeoff technique later in "Bullet the Blue Sky" as well. His backing vocals are sometimes in the form of a repeated cry; examples of songs that use this approach include "Beautiful Day", "New Year's Day" and "Stay (Faraway, So Close!)". Another technique he uses in his backing vocals is the falsetto, in songs such as "Stuck in a Moment You Can't Get Out Of", "Sometimes You Can't Make It on Your Own", "A Man and a Woman", "The Wanderer", live versions of "The Fly", and "Window in the Skies".

The Edge sings the lead vocal on "Van Diemen's Land," "Numb", "Evidence Of Life," the first half of the song "Seconds", dual vocals with Bono in "Discotheque", and the bridge in the song "Miracle Drug". He also sings the occasional lead vocal in live renditions of other songs (such as "Sunday Bloody Sunday" during the PopMart Tour and "Party Girl" during the Rotterdam Zoo TV show when it was Bono's birthday), and has sung the second verse of the "Stand by Me" cover on a few shows. A solo acoustic version of the song "Love is Blindness", which is featured in the documentary film From the Sky Down, is sung by him as well.

=== Other instruments ===
The Edge has played keyboards on many of the band's songs, including "I Fall Down", "October", "So Cruel", "New Year's Day", "Running to Stand Still", "Miss Sarajevo", "The Hands that Built America", "Original of the Species", and others. In live versions of "New Year's Day", "The Unforgettable Fire", "Your Blue Room", "Moment of Surrender" and "Raised By Wolves", he plays both the piano and guitar parts alternately. In most live versions of "Original of the Species", piano is the only instrument played during the song. Although the Edge is the band's lead guitarist, he occasionally plays bass guitar, including the live performances of the song "40" where the Edge and bassist Adam Clayton switch instruments.

=== Equipment ===
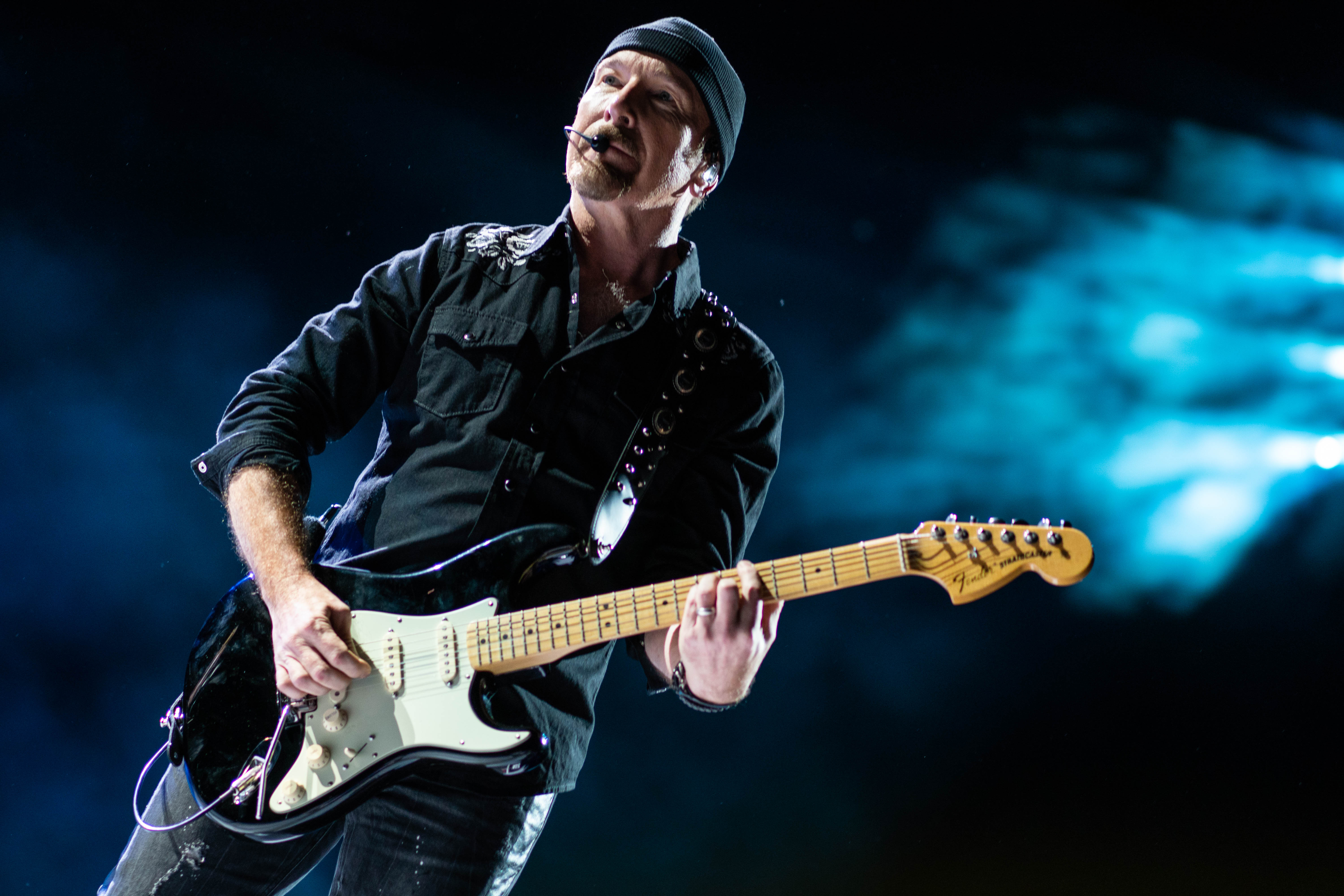
The Edge playing a Fender Stratocaster in 2019

The Edge plays electric guitar, acoustic guitar, keyboards, piano, bass guitar (on "40" and "Race Against Time") and lap steel guitar. Detailed gear diagrams of the Edge's U2 guitar rig for the 1981 October Tour, the 1983 War Tour, and the 2009 U2 360° Tour are well-documented. In 2016, Fender unveiled a signature model of guitar and amplifier designed in collaboration with the Edge: the Edge Signature Stratocaster and the Fender Edge Deluxe, respectively.

== Personal life ==
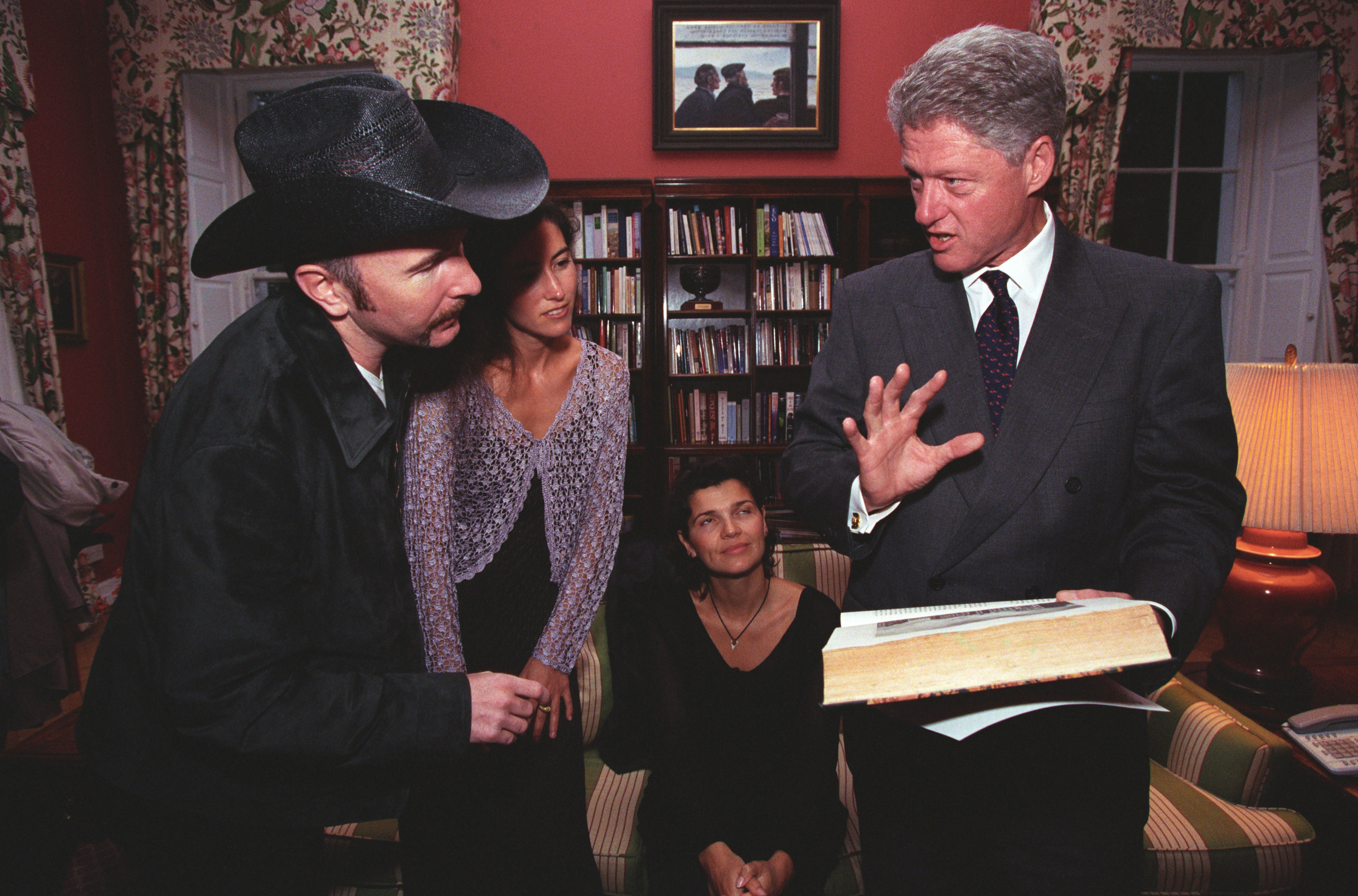
The Edge with his wife Morleigh Steinberg, Bono's wife Ali Hewson, and Bill Clinton

Evans was raised as a Protestant and was, along with fellow band members Bono and Mullen, involved with non-denominational Christian group the Shalom Fellowship as an adult.

Evans married his secondary school girlfriend, Aislinn O'Sullivan, on 12 July 1983. They have three daughters named Hollie (born 1984), Arran (born 1985), and Blue Angel (born 1989). The couple separated in 1990; Ireland did not have a provision for divorce at that time but divorce was legalised in 1995 and the couple divorced in 1996. In 1993, he began dating Morleigh Steinberg, an American professional dancer who was employed by U2 as a choreographer and dancer during the Zoo TV Tour. Their daughter was born in Los Angeles in 1997 and their son was born in 1999 in the same city. The couple married in Nice, France, in 2002.

In 1992, the Edge and Bono bought and refurbished Dublin's two-star 70-bedroom Clarence Hotel, and converted it into a five-star 49-bedroom hotel. In 2019, they sold the hotel leasehold, but they continue to own the building with Paddy McKillen Sr.

Evans has been criticised for his efforts to build five luxury mansions on a 156-acre (63.13-hectare) plot of land in Malibu, California, United States. The California Coastal Commission voted 8–4 against his plans. The Santa Monica Mountains Conservancy agreed to remain neutral on the issue following a $1 million donation from Evans and a commitment to designate 100 acres of the land as open space for public footpaths.

The Edge reportedly had a net worth of £330 million (equivalent to $410 million) in 2023.

After living in Ireland for 62 years, the Edge became an Irish citizen in June 2025 at the age of 63.

== Discography ==
Year	Title	Album
1983	"Snake Charmer" / "Snake Charmer" (Reprise) (Jah Wobble with The Edge and Holger Czukay) "Hold on to Your Dreams" (Jah Wobble with The Edge)	Snake Charmer
1986	Various tracks	Captive soundtrack
2011	"Rise Above 1" (Reeve Carney featuring Bono and The Edge)	Spider-Man: Turn Off the Dark
2021	"We Are the People" (Martin Garrix featuring Bono and The Edge)	Non-album single
2023	"Train with No Station" / "Noche Oscura" (Lol Tolhurst, Budgie and Jacknife Lee featuring The Edge)	Los Angeles

== Philanthropy ==
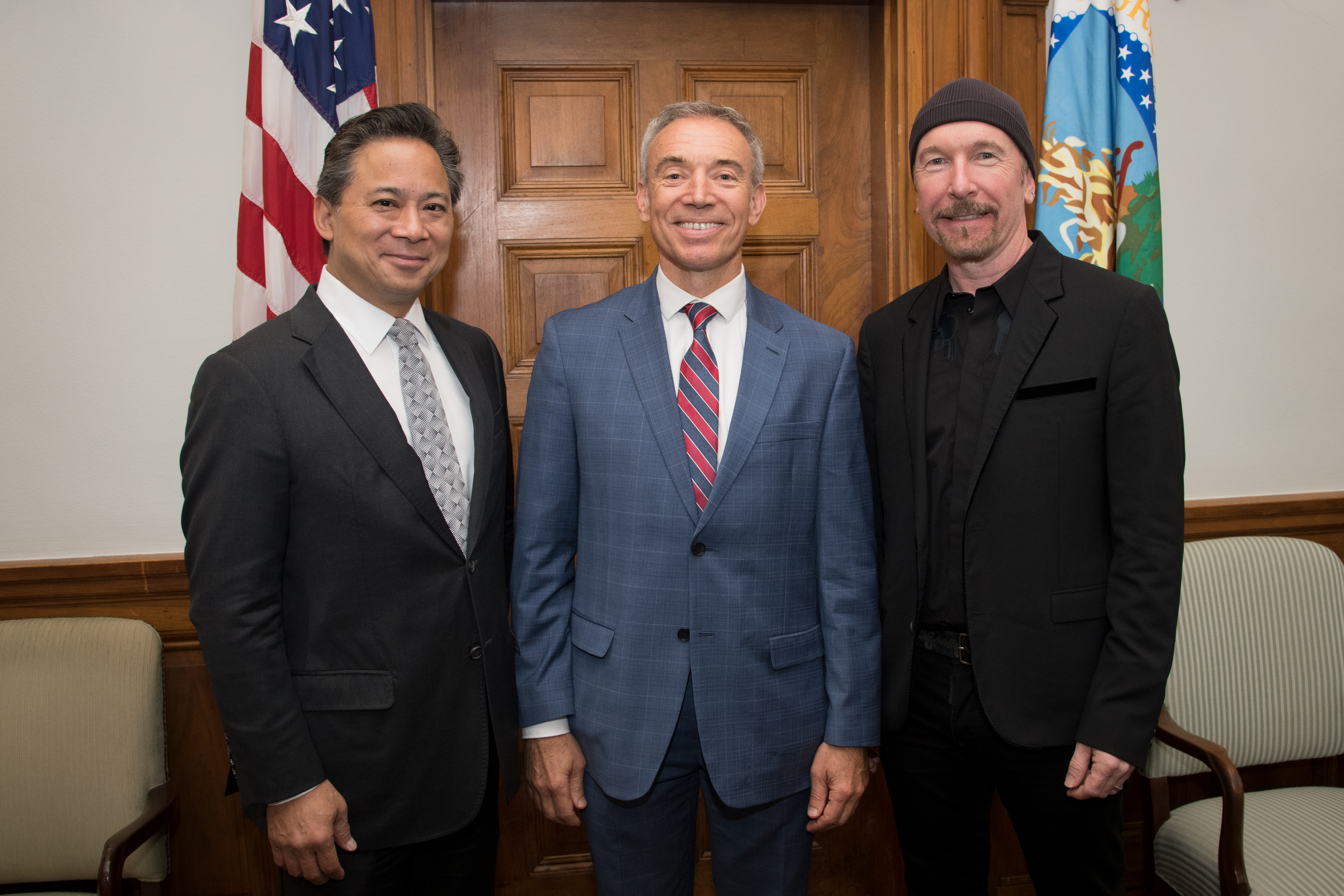
Angiogenesis Foundation co-founder Dr. William W. Li, US Deputy Secretary of Agriculture Stephen Censky, and the Edge

The Edge, Bob Ezrin and Henry Juszkiewicz co-founded Music Rising in 2005, a charity that helped provide replacement instruments for those that were lost in Hurricane Katrina. The instruments were originally only replaced for professional musicians but they soon realised the community churches and schools needed instruments as well. The charity's slogan is "Rebuilding the Gulf Region note by note" and has so far helped over a hundred musicians who were affected by Hurricane Katrina. The Edge also serves on the board of the Angiogenesis Foundation, a 501(c)(3) nonprofit organisation dedicated to improving global health by advancing angiogenesis-based medicine, diets, and lifestyle. In 2021, the Edge partnered with the charity Love Welcomes to sell a line of guitar straps that were handsewn by refugee women and featured a Morse code pattern; proceeds from sales of the strap benefitted employment and support of refugee women.

== Awards and recognition ==
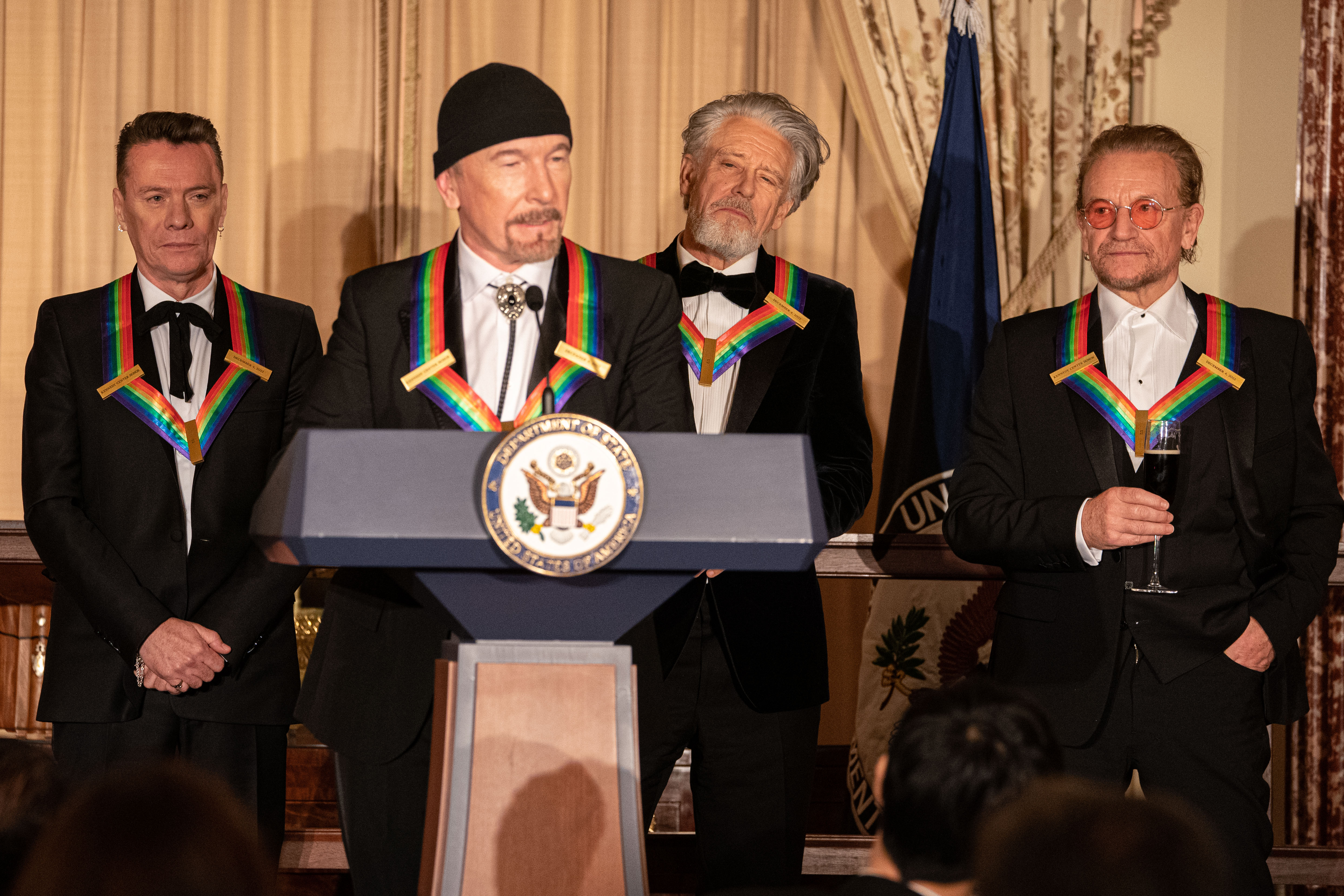
The Edge speaking as U2 receive 2022 Kennedy Center Honors

The Edge has won numerous awards with U2, including 22 Grammy Awards and two Golden Globe Awards for Best Original Song (for "The Hands That Built America" in 2003 and "Ordinary Love" in 2014). In 2005, he was inducted into the Rock and Roll Hall of Fame as a member of U2, in the group's first year of eligibility. In 2007, he received an honorary doctorate of music from Berklee College of Music. At the 2017 Bonnaroo Music Festival, the Edge was honoured with the Les Paul Spirit Award by the Les Paul Foundation for being someone who "exemplifies the spirit of the late, great Les Paul through innovation, engineering, technology and/or music". In May 2024, the Venice Family Clinic presented its inaugural HEART Award to the Edge and his wife Morleigh Steinberg, who are longtime supporters of the center, at its inaugural HEART (Health + Art) Gala.

In 2010, Gibson ranked him the 23rd-best guitarist of all time, saying that he "created a sound that is distinctly his own – no small feat when you consider he's had to do it in the course of three decades while working shoulder-to-shoulder with one of the biggest personalities in rock, Bono". The following year, Rolling Stone placed the Edge at number 38 on its list of "The 100 Greatest Guitarists of All Time"; Daniel Lanois called him an "innovative mind", a "scientist, and a poet by night", and said he is "dedicated to note-taking" to "document every detail of his sound". The magazine re-ranked the Edge to 47th place on its expanded 2023 list of the 250 greatest guitarists. In 2012, Spin ranked him 13th on their list of the 100 greatest guitarists, saying that he "masked and flaunted his willful ignorance of how guitars are meant to be played with forgiving delay pedals, forging a sonic trademark so distinctive that his band's name became an adjective". In 2015, Rolling Stone ranked Bono and the Edge at number 35 on its list of the 100 Greatest Songwriters of All Time.

== See also ==
- Timeline of U2
- List of people on the postage stamps of Ireland

== Bibliography ==
- Marstal, Henrik (2018). "'Edge, Ring Those Bells': The Guitar and Its Spiritual Soundscapes in Early U2". In Calhoun, Scott (ed.). U2 and the Religious Impulse: Take Me Higher. London: Bloomsbury Publishing. ISBN 9781350032569.
- Dunphy, Eamon (1988). Unforgettable Fire: The Story of U2. London: Penguin Books. ISBN 0-14-010766-5.
- Flanagan, Bill (1996). U2 at the End of the World (Paperback ed.). New York: Delta. ISBN 978-0-385-31157-1.
- Gulla, Bob (2009). Guitar Gods: The 25 Players who Made Rock History. Westport: Greenwood Press. ISBN 978-0-313-35806-7.
- Bono; The Edge; Adam Clayton; Larry Mullen Jr (2006). McCormick, Neil (ed.). U2 by U2. London: HarperCollins. ISBN 0-00-719668-7.
- McGee, Matt (2008). U2: A Diary. London: Omnibus Press. ISBN 978-1-84772-108-2.
