= Matthew Wilkas =

American actor (born 1978)

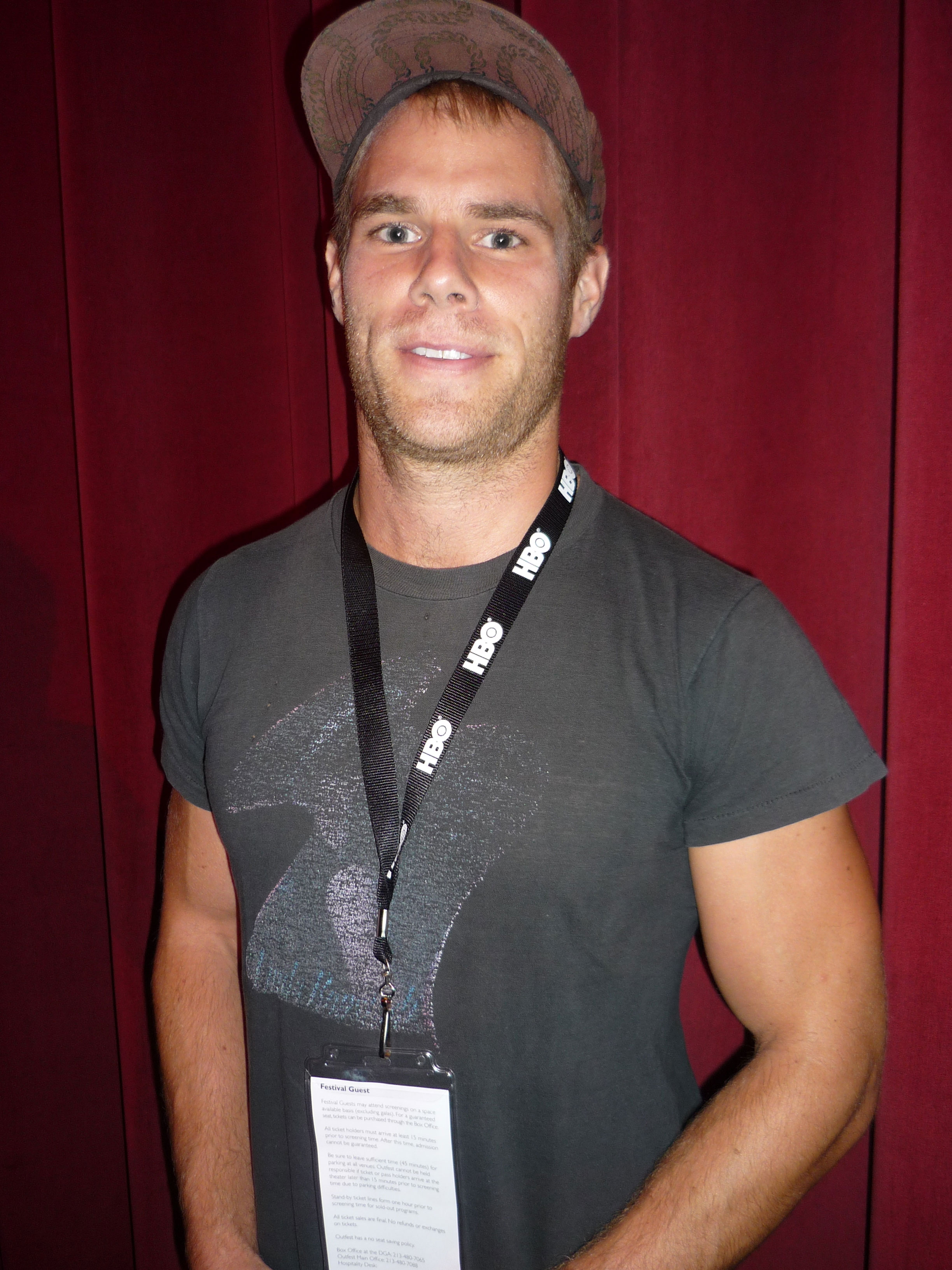
- Born: April 20, 1978 (age 48); Camden, Maine, U.S.
- Education: Boston University (BFA)
- Occupations: Actor and playwright
- Years active: 2003–present
- Partner: John Riddle (2021-present)

Matthew Wilkas (born April 20, 1978) is an American theatre and film actor, playwright and reality television personality. He is best known for his lead role as Matt in the 2012 feature film Gayby.

== Early life ==
Wilkas grew up in Camden, Maine, with his two sisters. When he was 12, his father died. He later went to Boston University on the theater program because they gave him a student-aid package. He later moved to Hartford, Connecticut, before moving to New York.

== Career ==
=== Theatre ===
Wilkas co-wrote with American actor and playwright Mark Setlock titled Pageant Play, a satire about the world of child beauty pageants. The play was produced in July 2008 at the Berkshire Theatre Festival. and in 2012, he was in the stage production Spider-Man: Turn Off the Dark replacing main actor Matt Caplan. Wilkas has appeared on stage in a number of acts including Silence! The Musical, The Last Sunday in June, Far and Wide, The Pride etc. He has appeared in the Williamstown Theatre Festival, the Huntington Theatre Company, the Berkshire Theatre Festival, the Rattlestick Playwrights Theater, and The Sundance Theatre Institute, under the direction of Michael Greif, Anna D. Shapiro, Will Frears, Carolyn Cantor, Mark Brokaw, Nicholas Martin, and Trip Cullman. In 2019, Wilkas starred in Little Shop of Horrors as Dr. Orin Scrivello at the Pasadena Playhouse

=== Film and television ===
His television career started in 2003 with a token role in the TV series Hope & Faith followed by brief appearances in The New Twenty and Ugly Betty. After many small roles on television, in 2012, he had a lead role in the feature film Gayby which debuted at the South by Southwest (SXSW) festival. In the film, Matt a comic book store worker (played by Wilkas) and Jenn a yoga instructor (played by Jenn Harris), best friends from college, now single and in their thirties, in agreement with a pact they had made in their youth, decide to have a baby ("gayby") together, even though Jenn is straight and Matt is gay. In 2012, Wilkas and Harris co-won the Award for "Best Acting Ensemble: Feature" during the Ashland Independent Film Festival for their roles in Gayby. The film won a number of other festival awards, named one of the top ten independent films of 2012 by IndieWire, and nominated for an Independent Spirit Award. For his performance in the film, Wilkas was named one of Out magazine's "Out100" and one of the Los Angeles Outfest Film Festival's "Five in Focus".

In 2014, Wilkas appeared in Undateable, an American television sitcom that aired on NBC where he was cast as the character Brett, Justin Kearney's gay friend (pilot only). He also appeared in a number of shorts including This Bachelorette Party Sucks and Masc Only.

In 2017, he had a lead role in New York Is Dead, a series that he co-wrote and produced. As Felix, he co-stars with Gayby actress Jenn Harris. Also in 2017, he is appearing in a lead role as X in "Boy Culture: The Series", an episodic sequel to the original 2006 LGBT American drama film Boy Culture. A Kickstarter campaign was launched for the production. The series will also include Darryl Stephens (as Andrew), Matthew Crawford (as Chayce), as well as Stephen Guarino and singer Steve Grand.

== Personal life ==
Wilkas is based in New York City and is openly gay. From November 2015 to July 2019, Wilkas was in a relationship with British-American freestyle skiing champion and Olympic athlete Gus Kenworthy. At the 2018 Winter Olympics, in Pyeongchang, South Korea, Wilkas kissed Kenworthy before his qualifying run in the men's slopestyle; the kiss was broadcast on live television and was lauded as being a significant moment in visibility of LGBT+ athletes.

He has been in a relationship with Broadway actor John Riddle since May 2021.

== Theatre ==
- 2008: Pageant Play (co-written with Mark Setlock) debuting in the Berkshire Theatre Festival. Work published by Dramatist Play Services.
- 2012: Spider-Man: Turn Off the Dark as Flash Thompson and understudying the character Peter Parker/Spider-Man (replacing main actor Matt Caplan)
- 2017: The Pride in various roles,
- 2019: Born To Win(co-written with Mark Setlock) premiered at the Celebration Theatre in L.A.
- 2019: Little Shop of Horrors as Orin Scrivello at the Pasadena Playhouse in Pasadena, California.

== Filmography ==
Film roles
Year	Title	Role	Notes
2008	The New Twenty	Cruise Guy	
2010	Gayby	Matt	Short
2011	Boys on Film 7: Bad Romance	Sam	Segment: Curious Thing
2012	Gayby	Matt	Based on the 2010 short film of the same name.
2014	Top Five	Gavin	
2015	You're Killing Me	Andy	
2015	This Bachelorette Party Sucks		Short
2016	Masc Only	Ryan Schultz	Short
2017	The Mummy	Reporter	
2018	Island Zero	Titus	
2019	Crystal Cliffside for Woke Vampires	Azazel Von Heinrich	Short

Television roles
Year	Title	Role	Notes
2003	Hope & Faith	Pallbearer	Episode "Remembrance of Rings Past"
2008	Ugly Betty	Waiter	Episode: "Bad Amanda"
2014	Looking	Benjamin	Episode: "Looking for Now"
2014	Saint Francis	Greg	TV movie
2015, 2017	EastSiders	Kevin	Episodes: "Sex Therapy", "Thick Like a Lotion" and "Priscilla"
2017	Hiatus	Matt the Trainer	Episode: "The Rebirth"
2017	New York Is Dead	Felix	6 episodes
2018–19	Matt and Dan	Various characters	Lead role with Daniel Vincent Gordh
2019	Bonding	Rolph	Episodes: "Old Friends, New Names", "Pete Shy" and "Double Date"
2019	Modern Family	Paul	Episode: "Perfect Pairs"
2020	AJ and the Queen	Officer Patrick Kennedy	Recurring role, 7 episodes
2022	And Just Like That...	Justin	S1 E9
2022–24	So Help Me Todd	Lawrence	Recurring role, 4 episodes
2026	Law & Order: Special Victims Unit	Sean Larkin	Gimmick //// S27 E18

Music videos
Year	Title	Artist
2018	"Brown Rice"	Natti Vogel
