= T. V. Carpio =

American actress and singer (born 1981)

- Born: Teresa Victoria Carpio; April 5, 1981 (age 45); Oklahoma City, Oklahoma, U.S.
- Education: The New School
- Occupations: Actress; singer
- Years active: 2000–present
- Spouse: Cato Herring
- Children: 2
- Parent(s): Peter Mui; Teresa Carpio

Teresa Victoria Carpio (born 5 April 1981) is an American actress and singer. She is best known for her breakthrough role as Prudence in the film Across the Universe (2007), in which she sang the Beatles song "I Want to Hold Your Hand". She gained further recognition for playing Valerie in the feature film Limitless (2011) and Shelby Prince in the Lifetime television series The Client List (2013).

She is also known for her starring roles in theatre, including Arachne in the original Broadway production of Spider-Man: Turn Off the Dark (2011) and Eurydice in the Citadel Theatre production of Hadestown (2017).

== Early life ==
Teresa Victoria Carpio was born in April 1981 in Oklahoma City, Oklahoma. She is the daughter of Hong Kong singer Teresa Carpio, with whom she has performed on stage as a guest singer, including at the Hong Kong Philharmonic Orchestra. Her father was Peter Mui, a fashion designer who founded YellowMan, a successful tattoo clothing brand, and co-founded Tungtex Holdings Co., a Hong Kong-based garment maker.

Carpio spent much of her childhood at an international school in Hong Kong and then, at the age of 11, moved to Springfield, Missouri. When she was 14, Carpio moved to New York. Carpio initially was an ice skater and planned on pursuing that as a career to become an Olympic ice skater but she was injured and realized as a teenager that she was not good enough. Carpio studied jazz vocals for two years at The New School.

== Career ==
After realizing that she could no longer pursue ice skating, Carpio began her career as a dancer. She danced with NSYNC at the 2000 MTV Video Music Awards, performed on Last Call with Carson Daly, and danced in music videos for Bruce Springsteen and Whitney Houston. In 2001, Carpio was a contestant on The WB television show Popstars, alongside Nicole Scherzinger, but did not win.

She made her television debut portraying a laundry lady in Law & Order (2002) and later appeared in one episode of The Jury (2004). Carpio portrayed Gail in She Hate Me (2004) and had her first major role as Angela Tsing in Sucker Free City (2004), both films directed by Spike Lee. Carpio made her Broadway debut in Rent as Alexi Darling and others, from December 2006 until April 2007.

Carpio decided to move to Los Angeles to pursue her acting career. Carpio's breakthrough came when she played Prudence, a gay cheerleader, in the film Across the Universe (2007), directed by Julie Taymor. She sang a rendition of the Beatles song "I Want to Hold Your Hand". Carpio's father, Peter Mui, appeared in the film as an extra in the role of a prankster.

From 2010 to 2011, she starred in the Broadway musical Spider-Man: Turn Off the Dark, directed by Julie Taymor, with whom Carpio had worked a few years earlier. Previews began on November 28, 2010, where she originally played one of the Greek narrators, Miss Arrow. Due to the departure of original Arachne actress Natalie Mendoza, Carpio officially replaced her in the role on January 4, 2011, after covering multiple times during Mendoza's absence. During revisions, Carpio's role was decreased extensively as the creative team and many critics believed the villainess was not working for the show. Carpio suffered a neck injury during a performance in March 2011. She made a full recovery and returned to the show over two weeks later. During this time Carpio made her major film debut in Limitless (2011), alongside Bradley Cooper, which premiered in March of that year. After delays, Spider-Man officially opened on June 14, 2011. Carpio departed the show on November 13, 2011.

Carpio has continued making various acting appearances on television, in films, and on stage. Most notably, Carpio had a recurring role as Shelby Prince in the Lifetime series The Client List (2013), portrayed Satomi in The Scribbler (2014), and starred as Eurydice alongside Reeve Carney in Hadestown (2017) at the Citadel Theatre. She then portrayed Sophie, a deaf woman, in the short film Noise (2018) which debuted in October 2018 at the Austin Film Festival and was released online on September 13, 2019, on Omeleto. In 2019, Carpio performed in the ensemble of Little Shop of Horrors at the Pasadena Playhouse.

== Personal life ==
Carpio is married to Cato Herring, a DJ. They have two children together, one daughter and one son, and live in California.

== Filmography ==
=== Film ===
Year	Title	Role	
2004	She Hate Me	Gail	
2007	Across the Universe	Prudence	
2011	Limitless	Valerie	
2014	The Scribbler	Satomi	
2018	Noise	Sophie	Short film

=== Television ===
Year	Title	Role	Notes
2002	Law & Order	Laundry Lady	Episode: "Patriot"
2004	Sucker Free City	Angela Tsing	Television film
2004	The Jury	Esme Kingman	Episode: "Mail Order Mystery"
2011	Late Show with David Letterman	Arachne	Episode: "18.100"
2011	Body of Proof	Jinx	2 episodes
2013	The Client List	Shelby Prince	Recurring role; 11 episodes
2014	Anger Management	Kiri	Episode: "Charlie Tests His Will Power"
2014	Stalker	Robyn	Episode: "Love is a Battlefield"
2015	Rizzoli & Isles	Zoe Blyer	Episode: "Gumshoe"
2017	Bloodline	Lauren Chu	Episode: "Part 30"
2023	Chicago Med	Dr. Grace Song	Recurring role; 10 episodes

=== Theatre ===
Year	Title	Role	Theatre
2006–2007	Rent	Alexi Darling / Ensemble	Nederlander Theatre
2010–2011	Spider-Man: Turn Off the Dark	Arachne	Foxwoods Theatre
2017	Hadestown	Eurydice	Citadel Theatre
2019	Little Shop of Horrors	Ensemble	Pasadena Playhouse

== Awards and nominations ==
Year	Award	Category	Nominated work	Result	Ref.
2007	Online Film & Television Association	Best Adapted Song	"I Want to Hold Your Hand" from Across the Universe	Won	
