= Rise Above 1 =

Single by Reeve Carney featuring Bono & the Edge

from the album Spider-Man: Turn Off the Dark
- Released: May 25, 2011
- Genre: Alternative rock, R&B
- Length: 3:53
- Label: Interscope
- Songwriters: Bono, the Edge
- Producers: Bono, the Edge, Alex da Kid

"Rise Above 1" is a single from the soundtrack of the Broadway rock musical Spider-Man: Turn Off the Dark, released in May 2011. The song was recorded by Reeve Carney, who portrayed Peter Parker/Spider-Man in the musical, along with co-writers Bono and the Edge of U2. Another version of the song contains the cast from the musical, titled "Rise Above 2".

The single peaked at number 74 on the Billboard Hot 100, becoming Carney's first single to chart.

== Performances ==
Carney, Bono, and the Edge performed the song live on the season finale of the 10th season of American Idol.

== Music video ==
A music video directed by Aaron Platt and Joseph Toman premiered in July 2011. It was produced by Jonathan Lia via GOODCOMPANY.

== Critical reception ==
Giving 3 stars out of 5, Jon Dolan of Rolling Stone magazine said that the song "may become a metaphor for its slog towards redemption." Victoria Meng of TheCelebrityCafe was critical of the song, saying it "tries to sound good and somewhat succeeds", but that the song didn't convey the true personality of Spider-Man.

== Chart performance ==
The song debuted on the Billboard Hot 100 the week of June 11, 2011 after being performed live on American Idol.

| Chart (2011) | Peak position |
|---|---|
| Canada Hot 100 (Billboard) | 71 |
| US Billboard Hot 100 | 74 |
| US Adult Alternative Airplay (Billboard) | 8 |
| US Adult Pop Airplay (Billboard) | 34 |
| US Hot Rock & Alternative Songs (Billboard) | 48 |
| US Heatseekers Songs (Billboard) | 5 |
