= Peter Mui =

Chinese-American fashion designer

Peter Kan Mui
- Born: Peter Kan Mui; April 29, 1953; Oklahoma City, Oklahoma, U.S.
- Died: August 18, 2009 (aged 56)
- Education: Trinity University
- Occupation: Fashion designer
- Years active: 1985–2009
- Spouse: Teresa Carpio (m. 1979; div. 1993)
- Children: T.V. Carpio

Peter Kan Mui (April 29, 1953 – August 18, 2009) was a Chinese-American fashion designer. He was known most for his brand YellowMan, which was a successful high-end tattoo clothing brand. The last recorded revenue for the brand was $12 million in 2008. Mui was also a country musician on the side. He was the husband of singer Teresa Carpio and the father of actress and singer T.V. Carpio.

On August 18, 2009, Mui died after experiencing a heart failure. He was 56 years old.

== Early life ==
Peter Kan Mui was born on April 29, 1953 in Oklahoma City, Oklahoma to Chinese immigrants. His father was an economics professor at Oklahoma City University. He graduated from Trinity University with a Bachelor of Arts degree.

== Career ==
Mui began his career trading porcelain from the Ming dynasty and jewelry and importing and exporting furniture after moving to China. His career as a fashion designer was jump-started after Bonwit Teller, a luxury department store, purchased five of his silk blouses that he had designed. Henri Bendel, Saks Fifth Avenue, and Neiman Marcus also purchased from him soon after.

In 1985, Mui purchased Pink & Dianne, a handbag brand, and began his own brand P.K. Mui, which was a sportswear collection. While staying at the Peninsula Hong Kong, he met Benson Tung, a tailor at Ascot Chang. In 1986, the two then co-founded, Mui co-founded Tungtex Holdings Co., a Hong Kong-based garment maker which made clothing for retailers such as Banana Republic, Ann Taylor, and Talbots. Mui also served as the president of Yellow River Inc., which was the U.S. subsidiary of Tungtex in New York. Yellow River's clients included Nordstrom and Macy's.

Around 2004 to 2005 Mui took out mortgages on all three of his homes in order to launch his brand YellowMan, a high-end tattoo clothing line with the idea of "combining wearable art with Asian empowerment." He named the brand after a racial slur that he was called during his childhood. For his brand he traveled the world looking for the best tattoo artists he could find to make the designs for his clothing. Mui found 10 of the best and devised a way to transfer an art traditionally done on skin onto clothing. The shirts, adorned with tattoo designs ranging from Maori tribal to American traditional, have become what Mui calls "wearable art," and the number of artists he used grew to 75. Mui said of his line: "I look at my [pieces of clothing] as being collectibles." Peter Mui later launched three other clothing brands: Misplaced Cowboy, designer jeans with tattoo art stitching; Mui Mui, Hawaiian-inspired shirts; and Samurai Surfer, casual shirts .

Mui's tattoo clothing has been featured in top magazines, including pictorials with model Lucia Dvorská in the 2009 Sports Illustrated Swimsuit Issue. In addition to producing clothing for his own brands, Peter Mui developed signature tattoo clothing lines for Athleta and Harley-Davidson, and has produced special edition tattoo clothing collections for Marvel and Disney's Pirates of the Caribbean. The last recorded revenue amount for his company was $12 million.

Peter Mui was also a country musician on the side and expressed his pride in his Oklahoma upbringing through his country music. Mui produced multiple tracks under the name Misplaced Cowboy. He also appeared as an extra in Across the Universe (2007), a film his daughter, T.V. Carpio, starred in.

== Personal life ==
In 1976, while exploring China, he met singer Teresa Carpio while she was performing at a night club and the two began dating. In 1979 the two married. In 1981, they had one daughter together, actress and singer T.V. Carpio. The couple split in 1983 but did not officially divorce until 1993.

== Death ==
On August 18, 2009, at the age of 56 years old, Mui died after experiencing a heart failure. He was 56 years old. He left behind a large tattoo art collection as he was a big collector.

== See also ==
- Chinese Americans in New York City
