= Mark Setlock =

American actor

- Born: June 26, 1968 (age 58); Cleveland, Ohio, U.S.
- Education: Kent State University (BFA); Harvard University (MFA)
- Occupation: Computer technician

Mark Setlock (born June 26, 1968) is an American former actor and playwright living in New York, NY.

Setlock was born in Cleveland, Ohio. He attended the Institute for Advanced Theater Training of the American Repertory Theater at Harvard University. He won the 2000 Outer Critics Circle Award for best solo performance in a tie with Olympia Dukakis, and received a Drama Desk nomination for "Fully Committed", which he helped create with playwright Becky Mode, and has performed in LA, Boston, Portland (Oregon), Bay Street Theatre, and London's West End. He was featured in the 1994 workshop and the Original Broadway Company of "Rent". He collaborated with Playwright Steve Murray on an adaptation of the screenplay It's A Wonderful Life, called This Wonderful Life which premiered in Portland, Oregon in 2005, and has been produced regionally. With Matthew Wilkas, Setlock is a co-author of "Pageant Play", a satire about the world of child beauty pageants, produced in July 2008 at the Berkshire Theatre Festival. Recent roles in New York: "The Last Sunday In June", "Roulette", "Tea and Sympathy", "The Safety Net", and "Never Tell". Television: Law & Order: Criminal Intent, Law & Order, All My Children, Film: New Suit, Life In Flight, Gangster's Crib.

== Filmography ==
- Life in Flight — Sam
- Law & Order — Bill Collins
- Law & Order: Criminal Intent — Detective Delay
- New Suit — Smokey
