= Reeve Carney =

American actor, musician, singer and songwriter (born 1983)

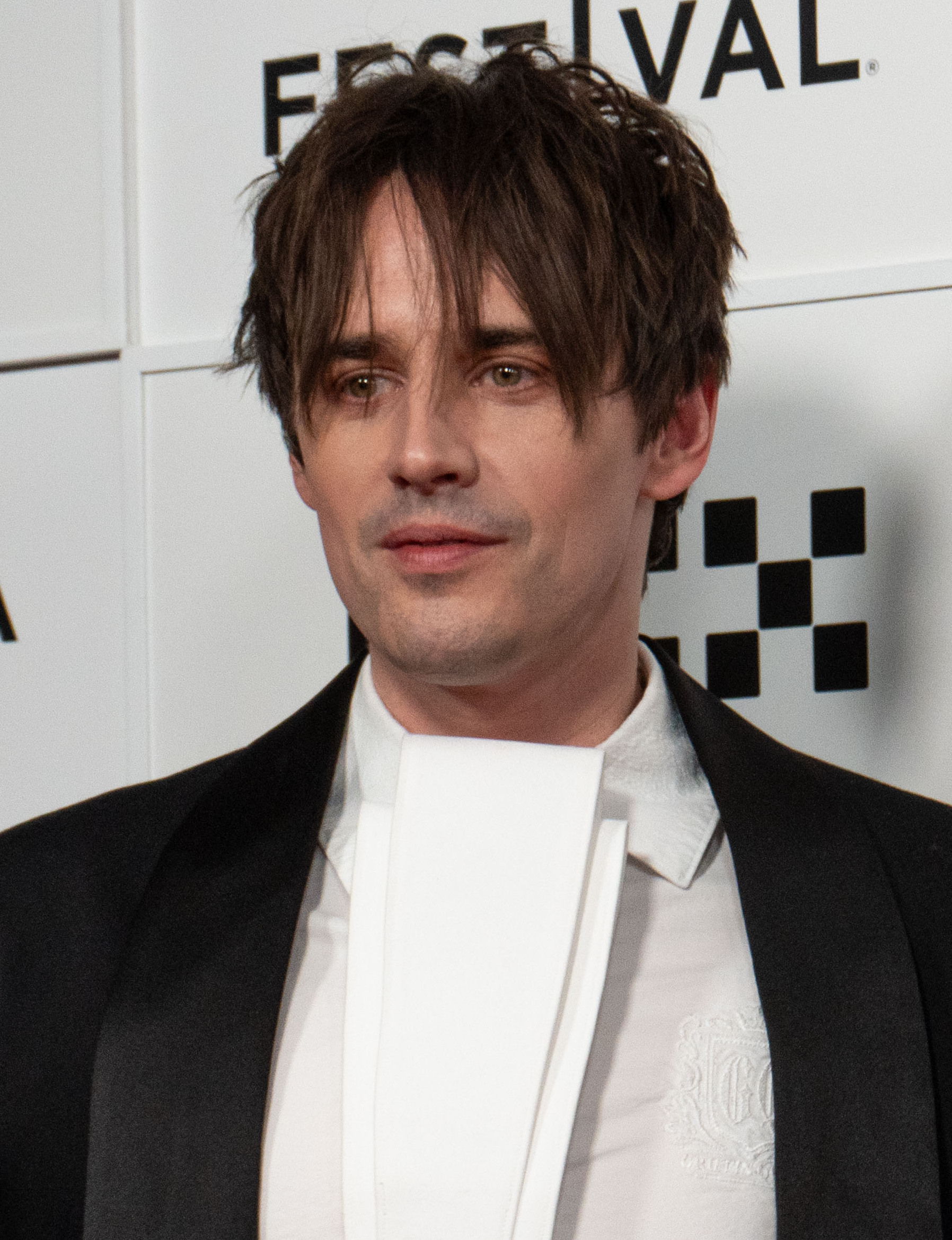
- Carney in 2026
- Born: Reeve Jefferson Carney; April 18, 1983 (age 43); New York City, U.S.
- Occupations: Actor; musician; singer; songwriter
- Years active: 1999–present
- Spouse: Eva Noblezada (m. 2025)
- Relatives: Art Carney (grand-uncle)
- Musical career
- Genres: Indie rock; blues rock; alternative rock
- Instruments: Vocals; guitar; piano
- Label: Interscope

Reeve Jefferson Carney (born April 18, 1983) is an American actor, musician, singer, and songwriter. He is best known for originating the role of Orpheus in the original Broadway cast of the Tony Award–winning musical Hadestown. He also played Peter Parker / Spider-Man in the Broadway musical Spider-Man: Turn Off the Dark, Dorian Gray in the Showtime series Penny Dreadful, and Riff Raff in the Fox musical television film The Rocky Horror Picture Show: Let's Do the Time Warp Again. In 2025, he returned to the stage as the Emcee in the West End revival of Cabaret.

== Early life ==
Reeve Carney was born and raised in the West Village area of Manhattan with his brother Zane and sister Paris. He grew up in a family of musicians and actors: his father, John, was a songwriter for commercials, his mother, Marti, was a singer, actress and a jewelry designer and his grand-uncle was Academy Award-winning actor Art Carney. He learned how to play the piano at a young age, and began singing for radio and television commercials. At the age of 8, he was chosen to sing in a live performance and video at Lincoln Center's Avery Fisher Hall with Peter, Paul and Mary. Two years later, he recorded "Childhood", a song with the New York City Children's Choir on Michael Jackson's 1995 album HIStory.

To get a music education, Carney attended the Academy of Music at Alexander Hamilton High School in Los Angeles with his brother, Zane, and future bandmates Aiden Moore and Jon Epcar. He went on to study at the University of Southern California Thornton School of Music, majoring in studio jazz guitar.

== Career ==
=== Music ===
Carney started to play guitar at age 12 and three years later he was playing guitar professionally at B. B. King's night club in Los Angeles. When living in California, Carney released his first EP Looking Glass in 2004 and promoted it by performing with other musicians, including Jonny Lang. At age 22 he signed with Interscope and formed his jazz-infused rock namesake band, Carney, consisting of Carney (songwriter, vocals and guitar), his brother Zane (guitar), Aiden Moore (bass) and Jon Epcar (drums). The band's vision led the manager David Sonenberg to work with them. Carney released their first EP Nothing Without You in 2008 and their debut album, Mr. Green Vol. 1, in May 2010. In 2009 the band went on tour with The Veronicas in their Revenge Is Sweeter world tour and in 2011 they opened for Arcade Fire and U2 in Moncton, Canada on July 30 on the final date of the U2 360° Tour.

When acting on Broadway, Carney was invited to be part of the album Broadway's Carols for a Cure in 2011 ("St. Nicholas Sky" featuring T.V. Carpio) and 2013 ("A Savior is Born"). Carney also recorded the single "Rise Above 1" with Bono and The Edge in 2011, an adapted song from the musical Spider-Man: Turn Off the Dark. Apart from making his own music, Carney also wrote songs for soundtracks for films such as The Tempest (2010) and The Twilight Saga: Breaking Dawn, Part 2 (2012). In October 2016 Carney released his debut solo album, Youth Is Wasted, which he wrote and produced himself. Since then Carney was on tour two times (Reeve Carney Fall Tour 2016 and Youth Is Wasted Tour 2017). Three songs from his album as well as the album itself were nominated in six categories on the 16th Annual Independent Music Awards (The IMAs). "Think of You" won Best Song – Acoustic, "Resurrection" won Best Song – Rock or Hard Rock and the album won Best Album – Adult Contemporary.

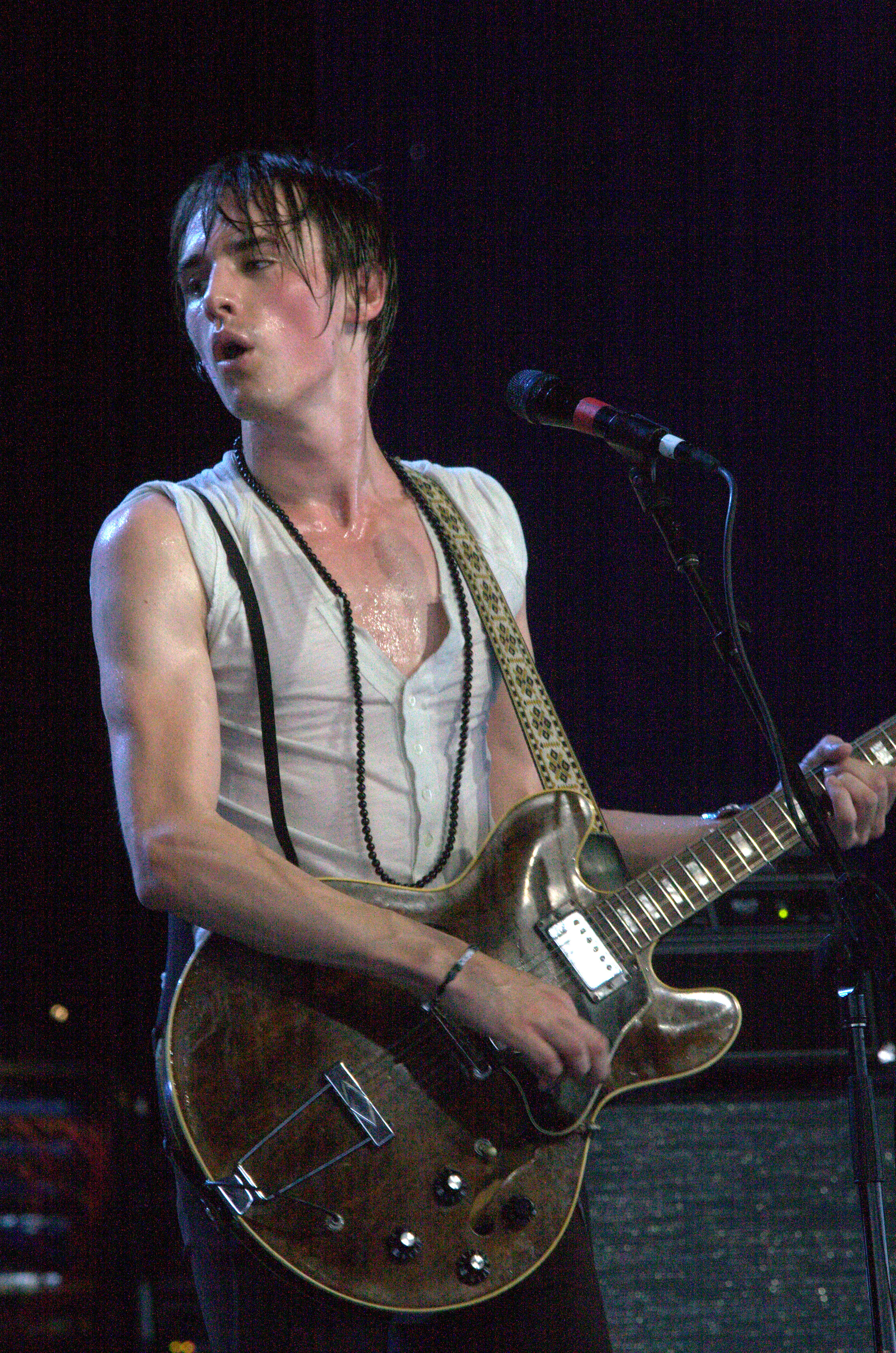
Reeve Carney at Byron Bay Bluesfest, Australia, 2010

=== Acting ===
Carney made his first appearance on the big screen in the film The Saint of Fort Washington (1993) with a small role. In 1999, Carney got the role of the young Ishmael Chambers in the film Snow Falling on Cedars. His performance received favorable reviews and subsequently earned him the Best Performance in a Feature Film at the 21st Young Artist Awards in 2000. Carney was part of the cast of a few films as a child actor before he decided to focus totally on music. In 2010, he was hand-picked by the director Julie Taymor to play Ferdinand in a film adaptation of William Shakespeare's play The Tempest. Taymor also suggested Carney for the lead role of Peter Parker/Spider-Man in Spider-Man: Turn Off the Dark on Broadway. During the auditions, Bono and The Edge, the show's musical composers, were surprised by Carney's vocals and he ended up being chosen for the role. He starred for 3 years as Spider-Man which began previews in November 2010. The rest of his bandmates performed as part of the pit orchestra for Turn Off the Dark. He played his final performance on Sunday, September 15, 2013. Meanwhile, in 2012, Carney played Taylor Swift's love interest in her "I Knew You Were Trouble" music video. Swift was a fan of Carney's band and came up with the idea.

In 2014, Carney was cast as Dorian Gray in the Showtime series Penny Dreadful. The show had three seasons (2014–2016). During the filming of the last season of Penny Dreadful, Carney was on Kenny Ortega's radar to play Riff Raff, the handyman, on Fox's remake of The Rocky Horror Picture Show. He got the role on the two-hour musical television film The Rocky Horror Picture Show: Let's Do the Time Warp Again and recorded three of the songs on the film's soundtrack. The film premiered on the Fox network on October 20, 2016.

In 2017, Carney joined the cast of the Citadel Theatre production of Hadestown as Orpheus. The production reunited Carney with his Spider-Man co-stars Patrick Page and T.V. Carpio. Carney continued with the musical for its run at the Royal National Theatre in 2018 and reprised the role in the Broadway production, which began previews on March 22 and opened on April 17, 2019. He departed the role on November 19, 2023, after 6 years. He reprised the role for his West End debut from February to March 2025 for a limited engagement opposite his original Broadway cast co-stars Eva Noblezada, Page, Amber Gray and André de Shields.

In 2021, it was announced that Carney had signed on to star as Jeff Buckley in a film about the latter's life, career and death. The film is tentatively titled as Everybody Here Wants You. The film has support from Buckley's family; his mother Mary Guibert, the film's co-producer, said "this will be the only official dramatisation of Jeff's story".

He portrayed The Emcee in Cabaret in the West End opposite his wife and former Hadestown co-star Eva Noblezada as Sally Bowles, who recently finished playing the role on Broadway. He joined the production on September 22, 2025 for a limited engagement until January 24th, 2026.

Carney began starring alongside his wife Eva Noblezada (who plays Daisy Buchanan) in The Great Gatsby on Broadway on March 30th, 2026, as the titular character Jay Gatsby.

== Personal life ==
From 2008 to 2011, Carney was in a relationship with Australian musician Lisa Origliasso of the Veronicas. From 2011 to 2012, he had dated actress Ashley Greene. In 2016, Carney began a relationship with actress Victoria Justice, which lasted for a couple years. The two had first met as co-stars while working on The Rocky Horror Picture Show: Let's Do the Time Warp Again.

In 2019, Carney entered a relationship with his Hadestown co-star Eva Noblezada. They announced their engagement on March 14, 2025, and were married seven months later in New Orleans, Louisiana.

== Discography ==
=== As solo artist ===
==== Studio albums ====
List of albums, with selected information
Title	Album details
Youth Is Wasted	Released: October 14, 2016; Label: Scissorhand Records; Formats: CD, digital download

==== Extended plays ====
List of albums, with selected information
Title	Album details
Looking Glass (as Reeve Carney & the Revolving Band)	Released: 2004; Label: Self-released; Formats: CD

==== Live albums ====
List of albums, with selected information
Title	Album details
Live at Molly Malone's (as Reeve Carney & the Revolving Band)	Released: January 1, 2007; Label: Interscope Records; Formats: CD/DVD, digital download

=== Soundtracks and cast albums ===
List of albums, with selected information
Title	Album details	Peak chart positions				
Title	Album details	US	US Cast	US Soundtrack	US Rock	US Indie
Spider-Man: Turn Off the Dark	Released: June 13, 2011; Label: Interscope Records, Mercury Records; Formats: CD, digital download	86	2	—	24	—
The Rocky Horror Picture Show: Let's Do the Time Warp Again	Released: October 21, 2016; Label: 20th Century Fox; Formats: CD, digital download	107	—	2	22	—
Hadestown (Original Broadway Cast Recording)	Released: July 26, 2019; Label: Sing It Again; Formats: CD, LP, digital download	49	1	—	—	4

=== Singles ===
List of singles as lead artist, with selected chart positions, showing year released and album name
Year	Title	Peak chart positions					Album
Year	Title	US	US Rock	US Heat	US Adult	CAN	Album
2008	"Nothing Without You" (with Carney)	— (Note: "Nothing Without You" did not enter the Billboard Hot 100, but did peak at number 7 on the Hot Singles Sales Chart, a component of the main Hot 100 chart.)	—	—	—	—	Nothing Without You & Mr. Green Vol. 1
2011	"Rise Above 1" (with Bono & The Edge)	74	48	5	34	71	Spider-Man: Turn Off the Dark
2016	"Up Above the Weather"	—	—	—	—	—	Youth Is Wasted
2018	"Never Gonna Give You Up" (with Scary Pockets)	—	—	—	—	—	Star Funk

=== As part of Carney ===
==== Studio albums ====
List of albums, with selected information
Title	Album details
Mr. Green Vol. 1	Released: January 1, 2010; Label: Interscope Records; Formats: CD, digital download

==== Extended plays ====
List of albums, with selected information
Title	Album details
Nothing Without You	Released: May 6, 2008; Label: Interscope Records; Formats: CD

=== Other appearances ===
Year	Title	Other artist(s)	Album
2006	"Think of You"	none	One Tree Hill (episode "The Wind That Blew My Heart Away")
2009	"Think of You"	none	Spread
2009	"Love Me Chase Me"	none	The Boys Are Back
2009	"Testify"	none	CSI: Miami Season 8 (episode "Kill Clause")
2010	"Testify"	none	Machete
2010	"O Mistress Mine"	Elliot Goldenthal	The Tempest
2011	"St. Nicholas Sky"	The Broadway Cast of Spider-Man: Turn Off the Dark	Broadway's Carols for a Cure, Vol. 13, 2011
2012	"New for You"	none	The Twilight Saga: Breaking Dawn – Part 2
2013	"A Savior is Born"	The Broadway Cast of Spider-Man: Turn Off the Dark	Broadway's Carols for a Cure, Vol. 15, 2013
2016	"Full Moon"	Soles of Passion, Paris Carney	Escape from Jurisdiction B
2016	"Hold On"	Soles of Passion	Bump Me Up

== Filmography ==
=== Film ===
Year	Title	Role	Notes
1993	The Saint of Fort Washington	Waving Kid	Uncredited
1994	Pom Poko	Various voices	English dub
1999	Snow Falling on Cedars	Young Ishmael Chambers	Young Artist Award for Best Supporting Performance in a Feature Film
2009	Spread	Lead Singer	
2010	The Tempest	Ferdinand	
2017	Gemini	Devin	
2021	House of Gucci	Tom Ford	
2023	Reunited	Oleksandr Volesky	Short film
2026	Hadestown: The Musical	Orpheus	Filmed stage production

=== Television ===
Year	Title	Role	Notes
1994	Dave's World	Extra	Episode: "The Funeral"
2004	Father of the Pride	Sal (voice)	Episode: "Donkey"
2015	Best of Boxing 2014	Himself	TV film
2014–2016	Penny Dreadful	Dorian Gray	Main cast (27 episodes)
2016	The Rocky Horror Picture Show: Let's Do the Time Warp Again	Riff Raff	TV film

=== Theatre ===
Year	Production	Role	Theatre	Notes	Ref(s)
2010–2013	Spider-Man: Turn Off the Dark	Peter Parker / Spider-Man	Foxwoods Theatre, Broadway	Original cast	
2015	Hello, Stranger	Stranger	The Abbey Theatre	Original cast	
2017	Hadestown	Orpheus	Citadel Theatre	Original cast	
2018–2019	Hadestown	Orpheus	London's National Theatre	Original cast	
2019–2023	Hadestown	Orpheus	Walter Kerr Theatre, Broadway	Original cast	
2024	The Tempest	Performer	Red Bull Theatre	Original cast	
2024	Faust	The Devil	The Soraya	Original cast	
2025	Hadestown	Orpheus	Lyric Theatre, West End	Replacement	
2025–2026	Cabaret	The Emcee	Playhouse Theatre, West End	Replacement	
2026	The Great Gatsby	Jay Gatsby	Broadway Theatre, Broadway	Replacement	

=== Music video appearances ===
Year	Title	Role	Artist(s)
2012	"I Knew You Were Trouble"	Ex-Boyfriend	Taylor Swift

== Awards and nominations ==
Year	Organisation	Award	Work	Result	Ref.
1999	Young Artist Award	Best Supporting Performance in a Feature Film	Snow Falling on Cedars	Won	
2018	Independent Music Awards (IMAs)	Best Song – Acoustic	"Think of You"	Won	
2018	Independent Music Awards (IMAs)	Best Song – Rock or Hard Rock	"Resurrection"	Won	
2018	Independent Music Awards (IMAs)	Best Album – Adult Contemporary	Youth Is Wasted	Won	
2018	Independent Music Awards (IMAs)	Best Producer – Pop	Youth Is Wasted	Nominated	
2018	Independent Music Awards (IMAs)	Best Song – Blues	"Father's House"	Nominated	
2018	Independent Music Awards (IMAs)	Best Song – Adult Contemporary	"Think of You"	Nominated	
2019	Outer Critics Circle Awards	Outstanding Actor in a Musical	Hadestown	Nominated	
2019	Broadway.com Audience Awards	Favorite Leading Actor in a Musical	Hadestown	Nominated	
2019	Broadway.com Audience Awards	Favorite Onstage Pair (with Eva Noblezada)	Hadestown	Nominated	
2020	Grammy Award	Best Musical Theater Album	Hadestown	Won	
