= George Tsypin =

American stage designer, sculptor and architect

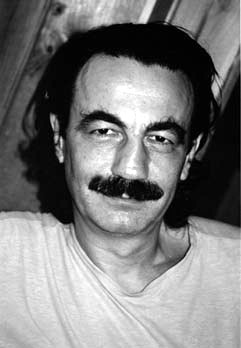
George Tsypin

George Tsypin is an American stage designer, sculptor and architect. He was an artistic director, production designer and coauthor of the script for the Opening Ceremony of the Olympic Games in Sochi in 2014.

== Early life and education ==
Tsypin was born in Kazgorodok, Kazakhstan (former Soviet Union), where his parents were in internal exile after being released from GULAG as political prisoners.

George Tsypin graduated from the Moscow Institute of Architecture in 1977. Since 1979, he has lived and worked in New York. In 1984, he graduated in set design from New York University.

== Career ==
George Tsypin is a sculptor, architect and designer of opera, film and video. He won a prize at an International Competition of "New and Spontaneous Ideas for the Theater for Future Generations" in 1977. Since then his opera designs have been seen all over the world, including the Salzburg Festival, Opera de Bastille in Paris, Covent Garden in London, La Scala in Milan and Metropolitan Opera in New York. Mr. Tsypin has worked in all major theaters in America, and in the '90s, he expanded his work to include designs for film, television, concerts as well as exhibitions and installations. The first personal gallery show of his sculpture took place in 1991 at Twining Gallery in New York. He created the Planet Earth Gallery, one of the Millennium Projects in England: a major installation of moving architectural elements, videos and 200 sculptures. George exhibited his work at the Venice Biennale in 2002. George studied architecture in Moscow and theater design in New York and won numerous awards. He has worked for many years with renowned directors and composers such as Peter Sellars, Julie Taymor, Zhang Yimou, Francesca Zambello, Pierre Audi, Jurgen Flimm, Philip Glass, John Adams, Kaija Saariaho, Andrey Konchalovsky and Baz Halpin. George designed "The Little Mermaid" and "Spider-man: Turn off the Dark" (Tony Award Nomination, Outer Critics Circle Award) on Broadway. His book "GEORGE TSYPIN OPERA FACTORY: Building in the Black Void" was published by Princeton Architectural Press in October 2005 (Golden Pen Award); the second book "GEORGE TSYPIN OPERA FACTORY: Invisible City" by the same publisher was released on October 18, 2016.

George Tsypin was an artistic director, production designer and coauthor of the script for the Opening Ceremony of the Olympic Games in Sochi in 2014. He was nominated for an Emmy Award for his work.

One of his latest works was the design of New York's very popular landmark "Sea Glass Carousel" in Battery Park at the South tip of Manhattan nearo the former World Trade Center.

George designed "Awakening", a groundbreaking $150 million spectacle at the Wynn Hotel in Las Vegas that premiered in November 2022.

His latest project was "Great Chin" in China: the biggest immersive spectacle ever created.

== Family ==
George lives in New York with his wife Galina. He has two daughters, Allie, a film director, and Sonja, a cinematographer.

== Selected publications ==
- Ancient history and present day politics in the opening ceremony of the Sochi Winter Olympics by Alexander Ortenberg. A history of Russian exposition and festival architecture, Routledge, 2019.
- Sculpting Space in the Theater: Conversations with the top set, light and costume designers – Paperback (October 12, 2006) by Babak Ebrahimian.
- George Tsypin Opera Factory: Invisible City, Princeton Architectural Press, 2016.
- GEORGE TSYPIN OPERA FACTORY: Building in the Black Void Princeton Architectural Press, 2005.
- Inside George Tsypin Opera Factory by Lucy Lu, Beijing, 2012.
- Looking Into the Abyss: Essays on Scenography by Arnold Aronson, University of Michigan Press, 2005.
- Tony Davis, Stage Design, RotoVision, 2001.
- Ronn Smith, American Set Design 2, pp. 159–173, Theatre Communications Group Inc, 1991.
- George was featured in Fifty Key Theater Designers from Renaissance to Present by Arnold Aronson, published by Routledge, 2023.
- "George Tsypin", Polyhymnion.
