= List of Fishbone members =

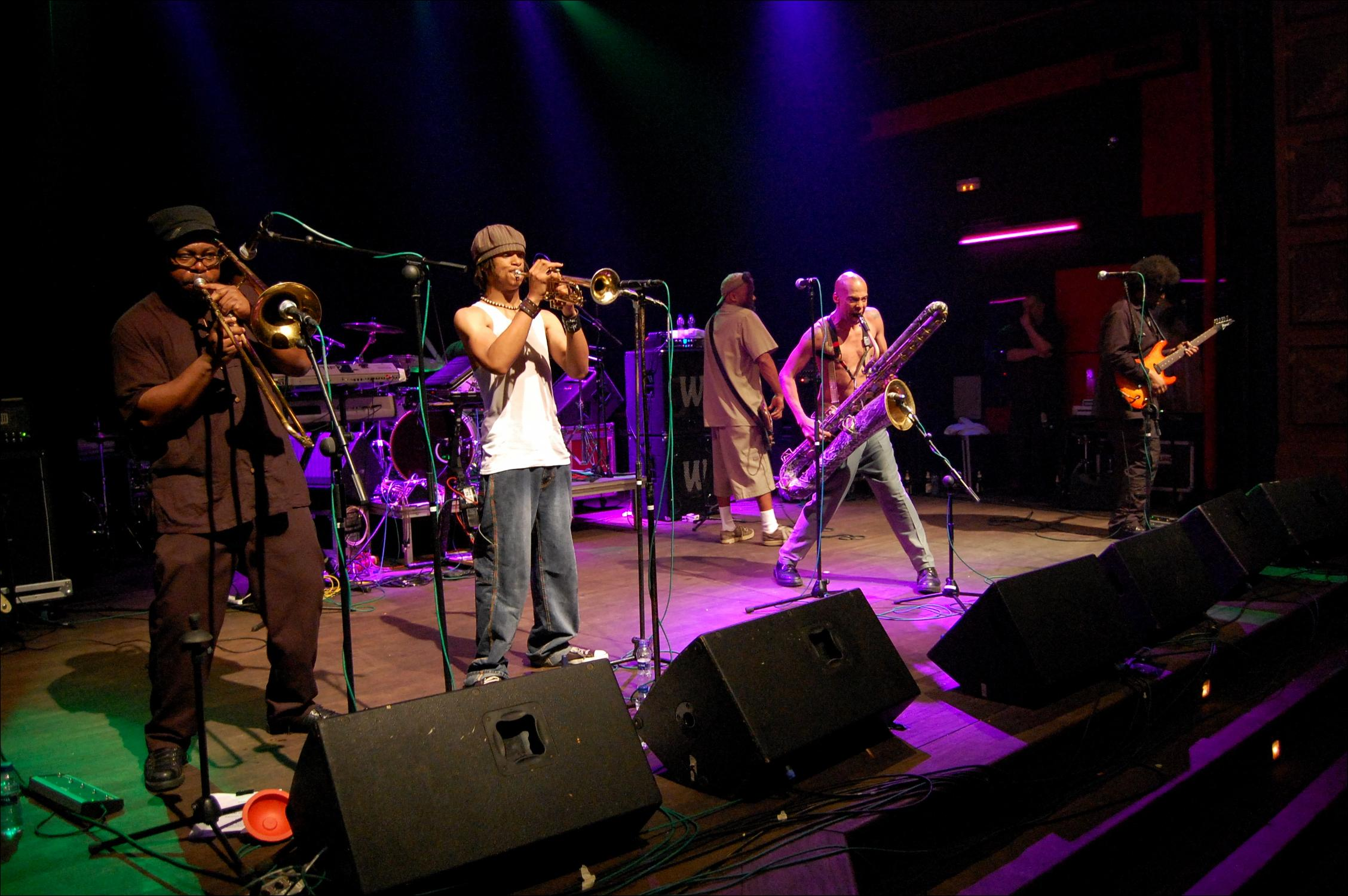
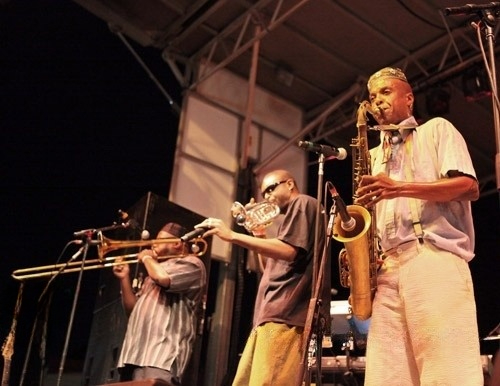
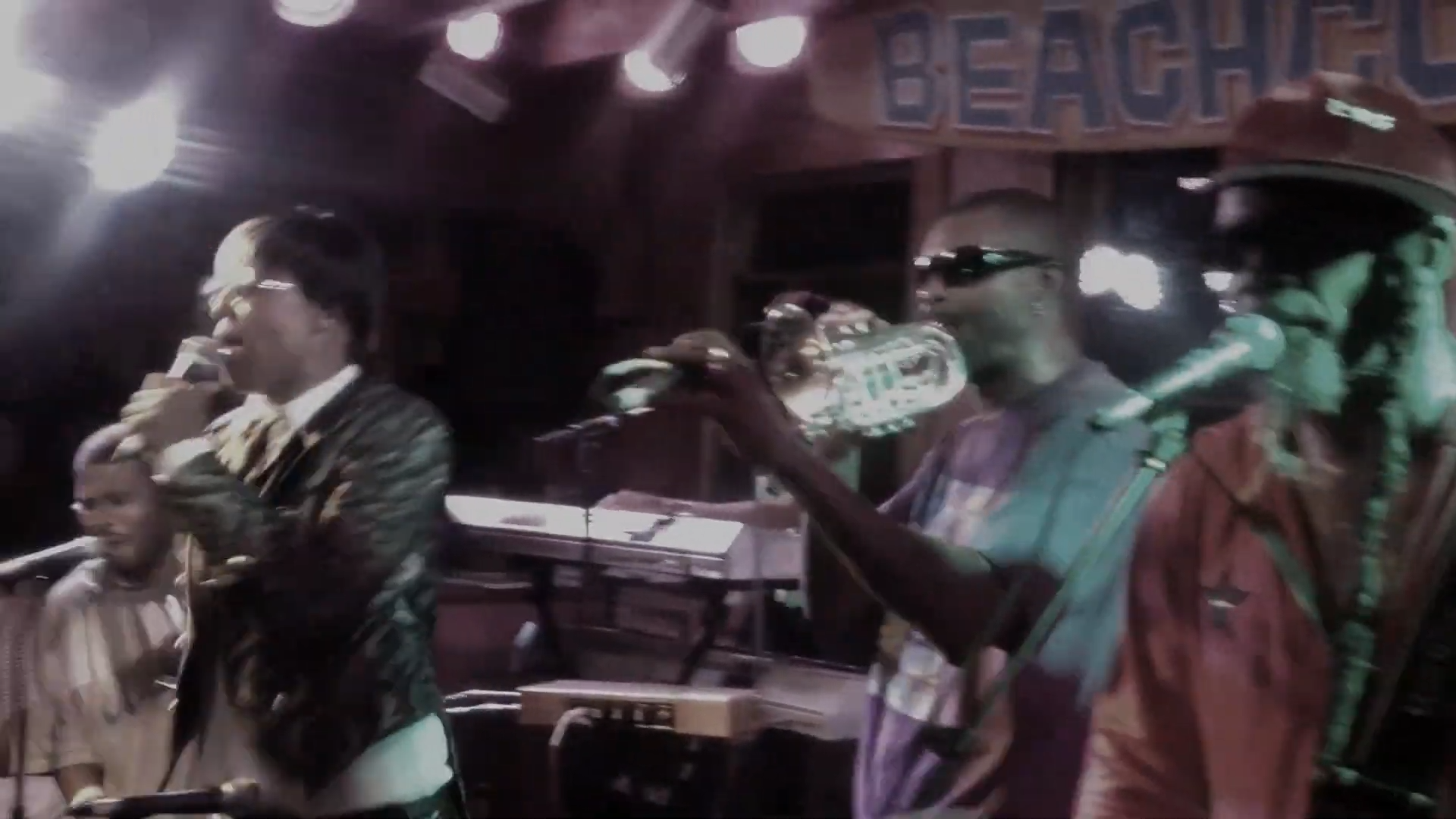
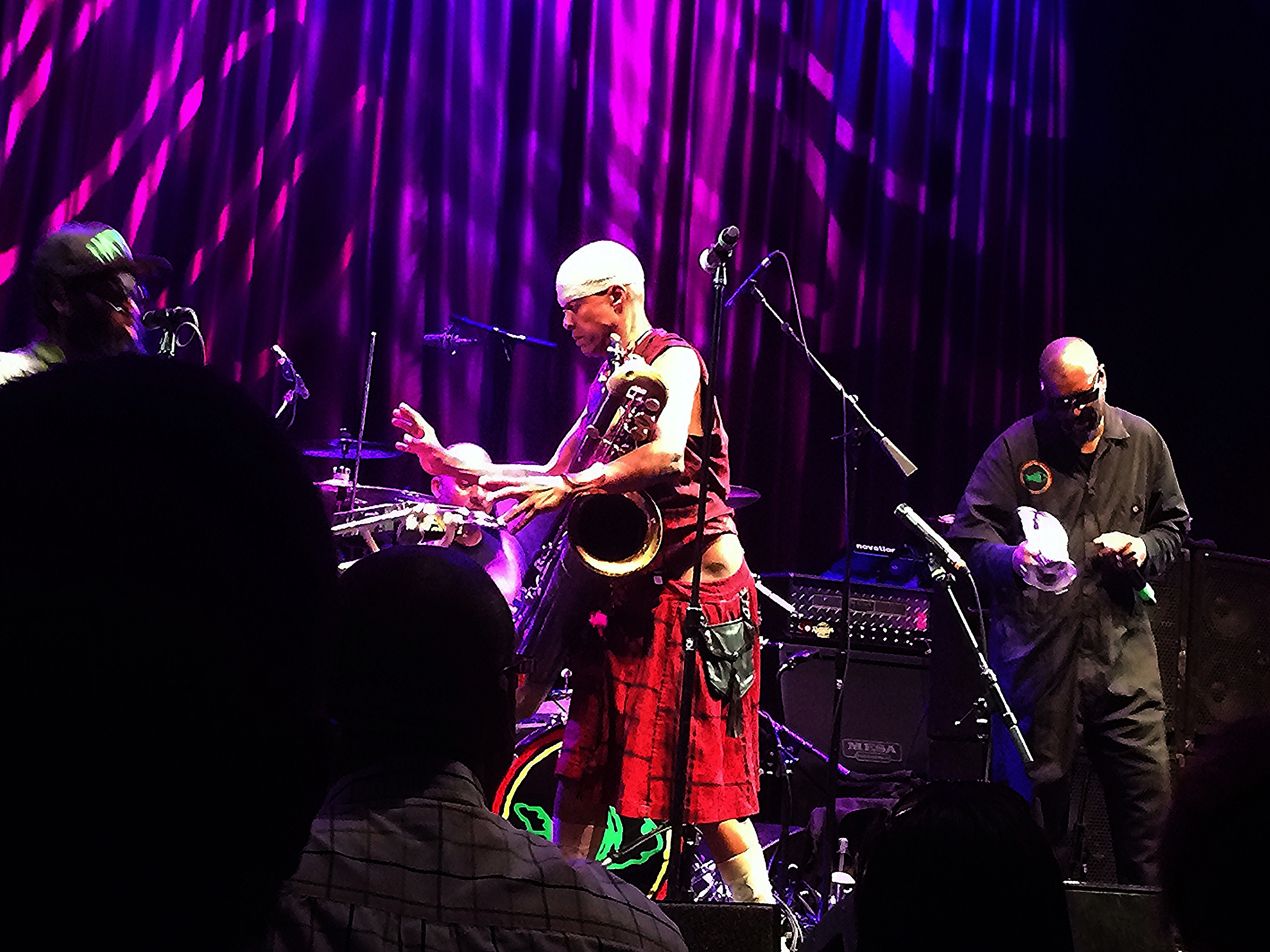
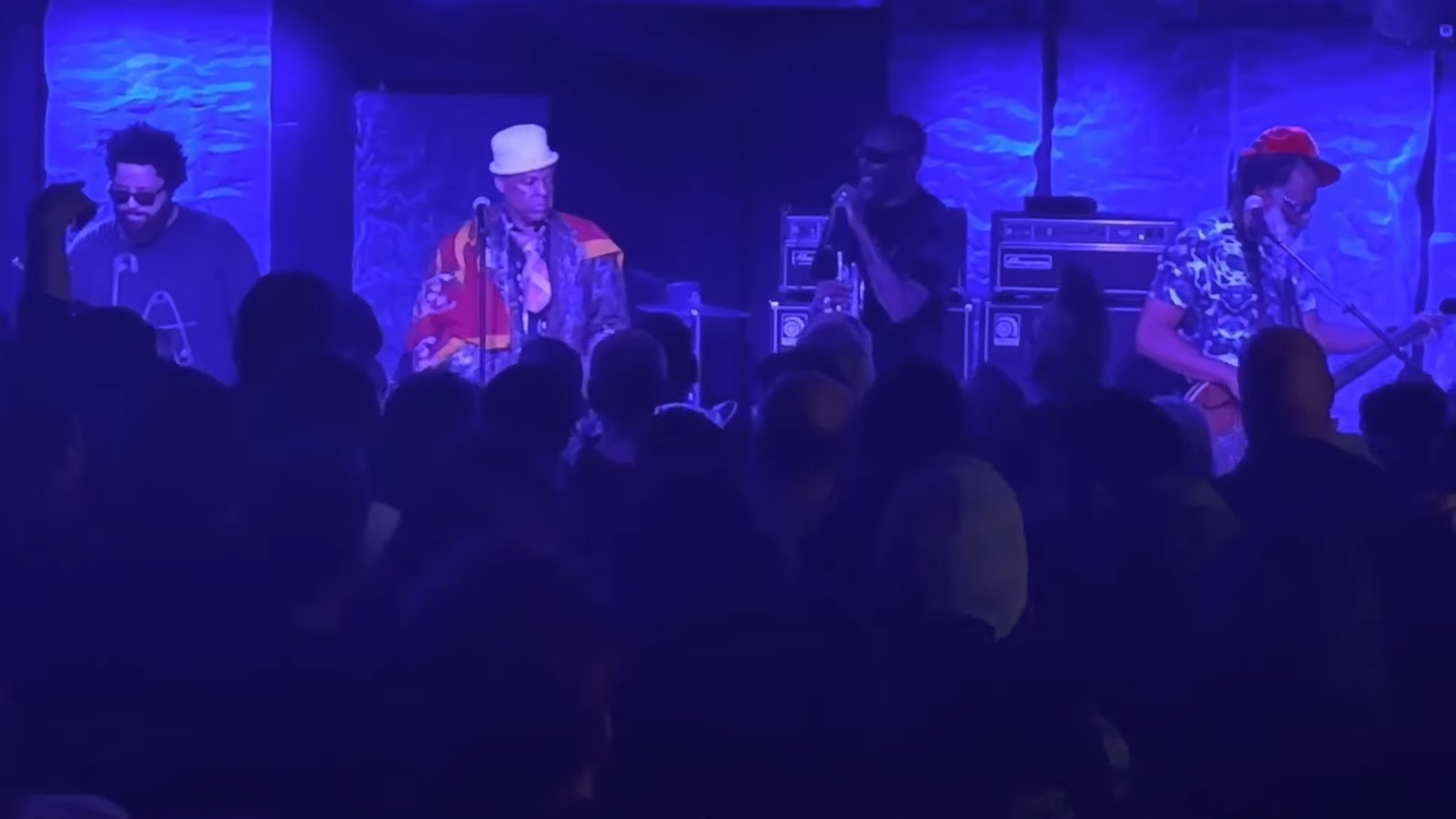
Fishbone performing in 2007, 2010, 2012, 2016 and 2022

Fishbone is an American rock band formed in 1979 with John Norwood Fisher (bass), his brother Philip "Fish" Fisher (drums), Angelo Moore (vocals, saxophones and theremin), Kendall Jones (guitar), "Dirty" Walter A. Kibby II (vocals, trumpet), and Christopher Dowd (keyboards, trombone, vocals). The band's current line-up consists of Moore and Dowd (who was absent between 1994 and 2018), with several new members added in 2024 and 2025.

== History ==
Fishbone was founded when all the members were in junior high school in 1979. After releasing two albums and two EPs, the band were joined by John Bigham on guitar and keyboards in 1989. Guitarist Kendall Jones left the band in 1993, soon followed by Christopher Dowd in 1994. Bigham left in 1997, and was replaced by Tracey "Spacey T" Singleton. Drummer Philip "Fish" Fisher also left later in 1998, he was briefly replaced by Clint Cameron and Dion Murdock before John Steward joined in 1999. Dowd was replaced by Anthony Brewster from 1997 to 1998, before John McKnight joined, who stayed until 2001

Walter Kibby and Singleton both departed in 2003. Fisher, Moore and Steward rebuilt the band with Rocky George of Suicidal Tendencies and Tori Ruffin of The Time on guitars (though Ruffin left soon thereafter), and Dre Gipson on keyboards. McKnight returned in 2005, the band also had various trumpet players, who were PaDre Holmes, Fernando Pullum, Mervin Campbell, and Curtis Storey. McKnight again left in 2010, the band were re-joined by Kibby around the same time. In 2011 the band were joined by Tom "Tom-Bone" Ralls on trombone and Tori Ruffin briefly returning a substitute for George. After touring the band were joined by Jay Armant as full time trombonist.

In February 2013, keyboardist Dre Gipson left the band after nine years, reggae musician Freddie Flint filled in temporarily on keyboards, before Paul Hampton joined in July. Original drummer Philip "Fish" Fisher re-joined in November 2016, replacing Steward. John Bigham returned to the band in 2017, replacing George. Keyboardist and trombonist Christopher Dowd returned in January 2018, replacing both Hampton and Armant. Making a reunion of the bands classic line-up, minus Kendall Jones.

Bigham again departed in December 2019, he was replaced by Mark Phillips. In November 2020, the band were re-joined by Kendall Jones for a one of performance. Phillip "Fish" Fisher left the group again in late 2021, after which John Steward rejoined on drums. In January 2024, Steward left the band for a second time. In April 2024, original members Norwood Fisher and Walter Kibby quit the band as well. In mid-2024, Aroyn Day (bass), Hassan Hurd (drums), and JS Williams (trumpet) joined as their replacements. Mark Phillips also departed in August 2024, Tracey Singleton returned as his replacement in November 2024. Day missed several performances with the band in December 2024 and bassist Jeffrey Connor filled in. The following month, Day announced that he had left the band and Connor has continued to perform with band. On March 5, 2025, James Jones was announced as Fishbone's new full member and bassist.

== Members ==
=== Current ===
| Image | Name | Years active | Instruments | Release contributions |
|---|---|---|---|---|
| | Angelo Moore | 1979–present | vocals; saxophones; theremin; percussion | all releases |
| | Christopher Dowd | 1979–1994; 2018–present (guest 2009, 2010, 2016) | vocals; keyboards; trombone | all releases from Fishbone (1985) to Give a Monkey a Brain and He'll Swear He's the Center of the Universe (1993); all releases since Fishbone (2023) |
| | Tracey "Spacey T" Singleton | 1997–2003; 2024–present | guitar | Fishbone and the Familyhood Nextperience Present: The Psychotic Friends Nuttwerx (2000); Fishbone and the Familyhood Nextperience Present: The Friendliest Psychosis of All (2002); Live at the Temple Bar and More (2002); Live in Amsterdam (2005); Stockholm Syndrome (2025) |
| | Hassan Hurd | 2024–present | drums | Stockholm Syndrome (2025) |
| | JS Williams | 2024–present | trumpet; vocals | Stockholm Syndrome (2025) |
| | James Jones | 2025–present | bass | Stockholm Syndrome (2025) |

=== Former ===
| Image | Name | Years active | Instruments | Release contributions |
|---|---|---|---|---|
| | John Norwood Fisher | 1979–2024 | bass; vocals | all releases except Stockholm Syndrome (2025) |
| | "Dirty" Walter A. Kibby II | 1979–2003; 2010–2024 (guest 2008) | vocals; trumpet | all releases to date except Still Stuck in Your Throat (2006), Fishbone Live (in Bordeaux) (2009), and Stockholm Syndrome (2025) |
| | Philip "Fish" Fisher | 1979–1998; 2016–2021 | drums; vocals | all releases from Fishbone (1985) to Chim Chim's Badass Revenge (1996) |
| | Kendall Jones | 1979–1993 (guest 2008, 2010, 2016 and 2020) | guitar; vocals | all releases from Fishbone (1985) to Give a Monkey a Brain and He'll Swear He's the Center of the Universe (1993) |
| | John "JB" Bigham | 1989–1997; 2017–2019 | guitar; keyboards; vocals | all releases from Set the Booty Up Right (1990) to Chim Chim's Badass Revenge (1996) |
| | Anthony Brewster | 1997–1998; 2003 | keyboards; trumpet; vocals | none |
| | John McKnight | 1998–2001; 2005–2010 (guest 2004) | keyboards; trombone; guitar | Fishbone and the Familyhood Nextperience Present: The Psychotic Friends Nuttwerx (2000); Fishbone and the Familyhood Nextperience Present: The Friendliest Psychosis of All (2002); Still Stuck in Your Throat (2006) |
| | John Steward | 1999–2016; 2021–2024 | drums | all releases from Fishbone and the Familyhood Nextperience Present: The Psychotic Friends Nuttwerx (2000) to Fishbone (2023) |
| | Rocky George | 2003–2017 | guitar | Still Stuck in Your Throat (2006); Fishbone Live (in Bordeaux) (2009); Crazy Glue (2011) |
| | Dre Gipson | 2003–2013 | keyboards; vocals | Still Stuck in Your Throat (2006); Fishbone Live (in Bordeaux) (2009); Crazy Glue (2011) |
| | André "PaDre" Holmes | 2004–2005; 2007–2008 | trumpet; vocals | Fishbone Live (in Bordeaux) (2009) |
| | Curtis Storey | 2005–2007 (died 2017) | trumpet; vocals | Still Stuck in Your Throat (2006) |
| | Jay Armant | 2011–2018 | trombone; vocals | Crazy Glue (2011) |
| | Paul Hampton | 2013–2018 | keyboards | none |
| | Mark Phillips | 2019–2024 | guitar | Fishbone (2023) |
| | Aroyn Day | 2024 | bass | none |

=== Touring ===
| Image | Name | Years active | Instruments | Release contributions |
|---|---|---|---|---|
| | Clint Cameron | 1998 | drums | none |
| | Dion Murdock | 1998–1999 | drums | none |
| | Torrell (Tori) Ruffin | 2003–2004; 2004; 2004–2005; 2005; 2011 | guitar | Ruffin played off and on between 2003 and 2005, he later returned as a touring substitute for Rocky George in 2011. |
| | Elizabeth Lea | 2003–2004 | trombone | none |
| | Mervin Campbell | 2003–2004; 2008 | trumpet | none |
| | Fernando Pullum | 2007; 2009; 2010 | trumpet | none |
| | Tom Bone Ralls | 2011 | trombone | none |
| | Freddie Flint | 2013 | keyboards | none |
| | Jeffrey Connor | 2024 | bass | none |

=== Guests/substitutes ===
| Image | Name | Years active | Instruments | Notes |
|---|---|---|---|---|
| | Foley | 1993 | bass; drums | played bass and drums at one show on June 25, 1993. |
| | Earl Hudson | 1993 | drums | played drums at nine shows between September 23, and October 2 1993. |
| | Gil Sharone | 1998 | drums | played drums at one show on March 22, 1998. |
| | James Gray | 1998 | drums | played drums at twelve shows between May 25 and September 30, 1998. |
| | Tim Moynahan | 2003 | trombone | played trombone at five shows between November 21 and December 13, 2003. |
| | Flea | 2003 | trumpet | played trumpet at one show on November, 26 2003. |
| | Big Na, Mike T and Stuff | 2005 | drums | played drums at one show on April, 22 2005. |
| | Ikey Owens | 2012–2013 | keyboards | played keyboards at four shows between December 20, 2012 and January 1, 2013. |

== Line-ups ==
| Period | Members | Releases |
|---|---|---|
| 1979 – 1989 | Angelo Moore - saxophone, vocals; Walter A. Kibby II - trumpet, vocals; Kendall Jones - guitar, vocals; Christopher Dowd - keyboards, trombone, vocals; John Norwood Fisher - bass guitar, vocals; Philip "Fish" Fisher - drums, vocals | Fishbone (1985); In Your Face (1986); It's a Wonderful Life (1987); Truth and Soul (1988) |
| 1989 – 1993 | Angelo Moore - saxophone, vocals; Walter A. Kibby II - trumpet, vocals; Kendall Jones - guitar, vocals; Christopher Dowd - keyboards, trombone, vocals; John Norwood Fisher - bass guitar, vocals; Philip "Fish" Fisher - drums, vocals; John Bigham - guitar, keyboards | Set the Booty Up Right (1990); The Reality of My Surroundings (1991); Give a Monkey a Brain and He'll Swear He's the Center of the Universe (1993) |
| 1993 – 1994 | Angelo Moore - saxophone, vocals; Walter A. Kibby II - trumpet, vocals; Christopher Dowd - keyboards, trombone, vocals; John Norwood Fisher - bass guitar, vocals; Philip "Fish" Fisher - drums, vocals; John Bigham - guitar | none |
| 1995 – 1997 | Angelo Moore - saxophone, vocals; Walter A. Kibby II - trumpet, vocals; John Norwood Fisher - bass guitar, vocals; Philip "Fish" Fisher - drums, vocals; John Bigham - guitar | Chim Chim's Badass Revenge (1996) |
| 1997 – 1998 | Angelo Moore - saxophone, vocals; Walter A. Kibby II - trumpet, vocals; John Norwood Fisher - bass guitar, vocals; Philip "Fish" Fisher - drums, vocals; Spacey T - guitar; Anthony Brewster - keyboards, valve trombone, vocals | none |
| 1998 | Angelo Moore - saxophone, vocals; Walter A. Kibby II - trumpet, vocals; John Norwood Fisher - bass guitar, vocals; Spacey T - guitar; Anthony Brewster - keyboards, valve trombone, vocals; Clint Cameron - drums | none |
| 1998 – 1999 | Angelo Moore - saxophone, vocals; Walter A. Kibby II - trumpet, vocals; John Norwood Fisher - bass guitar, vocals; Spacey T - guitar; John McKnight - keyboards, trombone, guitar; Dion Murdock - drums | none |
| 1999 – 2001 | Angelo Moore - saxophone, vocals; Walter A. Kibby II - trumpet, vocals; John Norwood Fisher - bass guitar, vocals; Spacey T - guitar; John McKnight - keyboards, trombone, guitar; John Steward - drums | Fishbone and the Familyhood Nextperience Present: The Psychotic Friends Nuttwerx (2000); Fishbone and the Familyhood Nextperience Present: The Friendliest Psychosis of All (2002) |
| 2001 – 2003 | Angelo Moore - saxophone, vocals; Walter A. Kibby II - trumpet, vocals; John Norwood Fisher - bass guitar, vocals; Spacey T - guitar; John Steward - drums | Live at the Temple Bar and More (2002); Live in Amsterdam (2005) |
| 2003 – 2004 | Angelo Moore - saxophone, vocals; John Norwood Fisher - bass guitar, vocals; John Steward - drums; Rocky George - guitar; Tori Ruffin - guitar; Dre Gipson - keyboards; Mervin Campbell - trumpet, flugelhorn | none |
| 2004 | Angelo Moore - saxophone, vocals; John Norwood Fisher - bass guitar, vocals; John Steward - drums; Rocky George - guitar; Tori Ruffin - guitar; Dre Gipson - keyboards; Dre Holmes - trumpet, vocals | none |
| 2004 – 2005 | Angelo Moore - saxophone, vocals; John Norwood Fisher - bass guitar, vocals; John Steward - drums; Dre Holmes - trumpet, vocals; Rocky George - guitar; Dre Gipson - keyboards; John McKnight - keyboards, trombone, guitar | none |
| 2005 – 2007 | Angelo Moore - saxophone, vocals; John Norwood Fisher - bass guitar, vocals; John Steward - drums; Rocky George - guitar; Dre Gipson - keyboards; John McKnight - keyboards, trombone, guitar; Curtis Storey - trumpet, vocals | Still Stuck in Your Throat (2006) |
| 2007 – 2008 | Angelo Moore - saxophone, vocals; John Norwood Fisher - bass guitar, vocals; John Steward - drums; Rocky George - guitar; Dre Gipson - keyboards; John McKnight - keyboards, trombone, guitar; Dre Holmes - trumpet, vocals | none |
| 2008 – 2010 | Angelo Moore - saxophone, vocals; John Norwood Fisher - bass guitar, vocals; John Steward - drums; Rocky George - guitar; Dre Gipson - keyboards; John McKnight - keyboards, trombone, guitar; Mervin Campbell - trumpet, flugelhorn | none |
| 2010 – 2011 | Angelo Moore - saxophone, vocals; John Norwood Fisher - bass guitar, vocals; John Steward - drums; Rocky George - guitar; Dre Gipson - keyboards; John McKnight - keyboards, trombone, guitar; Walter A. Kibby II - trumpet, vocals | none |
| 2011 | Angelo Moore - saxophone, vocals; John Norwood Fisher - bass guitar, vocals; John Steward - drums; Rocky George - guitar; Dre Gipson - keyboards; Walter A. Kibby II - trumpet, vocals; Tom Bone Ralls - trombone | none |
| 2011 – 2013 | Angelo Moore - saxophone, vocals; John Norwood Fisher - bass guitar, vocals; John Steward - drums; Rocky George - guitar; Dre Gipson - keyboards; Walter A. Kibby II - trumpet, vocals; Jay Armant - trombone, vocals | Crazy Glue (2011); Intrinsically Intertwined (2014) |
| 2013 | Angelo Moore - saxophone, vocals; John Norwood Fisher - bass guitar, vocals; John Steward - drums; Rocky George - guitar; Walter A. Kibby II - trumpet, vocals; Jay Armant - trombone, vocals; Freddie Flint - keyboards (unofficial) | none |
| 2013 – 2016 | Angelo Moore - saxophone, vocals; John Norwood Fisher - bass guitar, vocals; John Steward - drums; Rocky George - guitar; Walter A. Kibby II - trumpet, vocals; Jay Armant - trombone, vocals; Paul Hampton - keyboards | none |
| 2016 – 2017 | Angelo Moore - saxophone, vocals; John Norwood Fisher - bass guitar, vocals; Rocky George - guitar; Walter A. Kibby II - trumpet, vocals; Jay Armant - trombone, vocals; Paul Hampton - keyboards; Philip "Fish" Fisher - drums | none |
| 2017 – 2018 | Angelo Moore - saxophone, vocals; John Norwood Fisher - bass guitar, vocals; Rocky George - guitar; Walter A. Kibby II - trumpet, vocals; Jay Armant - trombone, vocals; Paul Hampton - keyboards; Philip "Fish" Fisher - drums; John Bigham - guitar | none |
| 2018 – 2019 | Angelo Moore - saxophone, vocals; John Norwood Fisher - bass guitar, vocals; Walter A. Kibby II - trumpet, vocals; Christopher Dowd - keyboards, trombone, vocals; Philip "Fish" Fisher - drums; John Bigham - guitar | none |
| 2019 – 2021 | Angelo Moore - saxophone, vocals; John Norwood Fisher - bass guitar, vocals; Walter A. Kibby II - trumpet, vocals; Christopher Dowd - keyboards, trombone, vocals; Philip "Fish" Fisher - drums; Mark Phillips - guitar | none |
| 2021 – 2024 | Angelo Moore - saxophone, vocals; John Norwood Fisher - bass guitar, vocals; Walter A. Kibby II - trumpet, vocals; Christopher Dowd - keyboards, trombone, vocals; Mark Phillips - guitar; John Steward - drums | Fishbone (2023) |
| 2024 | Angelo Moore - saxophone, vocals; Christopher Dowd - keyboards, trombone, vocals; Mark Phillips - guitar; Aroyn Day - bass, vocals; Hassan Hurd - drums; JS Williams - trumpet, vocals | |
| 2024 | Angelo Moore - saxophone, vocals; Christopher Dowd - keyboards, trombone, vocals; Spacey T - guitar; Aroyn Day - bass, vocals; Hassan Hurd - drums; JS Williams - trumpet, vocals | |
| 2024 – present | Angelo Moore - saxophone, vocals; Christopher Dowd - keyboards, trombone, vocals; Spacey T - guitar; Jeffrey Connor - bass; Hassan Hurd - drums; JS Williams - trumpet, vocals | |
