= Fishbone 101: Nuttasaurusmeg Fossil Fuelin' the Fonkay =

Compilation album by Fishbone
- Released: 1996
- Recorded: 1985–1993
- Genre: Ska punk; funk metal; alternative rock; alternative metal
- Length: 73:01 (Disc One); 73:58 (Disc Two)
- Label: Sony
- Producer: David Kahne

Fishbone 101: Nuttasaurusmeg Fossil Fuelin' the Fonkay is a two-CD compilation album by the American rock band Fishbone, released in 1996 by Sony Music. The first disc contains album tracks (some in edited versions) from the Fishbone albums up to 1993. The second disc contains B-sides, alternate versions, EP tracks, demos, and other non-album items from the same time period. "The Goose" is a previously unreleased cover of the song by the funk band Parliament. The previously unreleased demo track "Alcoholic" was later rerecorded for the 1996 studio album Chim Chim's Badass Revenge. The previously unreleased demo track "Pink Vapor Stew" was later reworked as "Party at Ground Zero" on their 1985 debut Fishbone, and another demo recording, "Game of Destruction", was also reworked as "Pressure" on their third LP, 1991's The Reality of My Surroundings.

== Track listing ==
Disc One
No.	Title	Writer(s)	Original album	Length
1.	"Party at Ground Zero"	Kendall Jones, Angelo Moore, John Norwood Fisher	Fishbone (1985)	6:28
2.	"? (Modern Industry)" (Edited Version)	David Kahne, Jones	Fishbone	3:49
3.	"Ugly"	Jones	Fishbone	2:50
4.	"Lyin' Ass Bitch"	Lisa R. Grant, Jones, Moore	Fishbone	4:15
5.	"When Problems Arise"	Jones, J. Fisher, Kahne	In Your Face (1986)	3:55
6.	"A Selection"	Moore, Jones, Kahne	In Your Face	3:01
7.	"Cholly"	Moore, Jones	In Your Face	2:48
8.	"It's a Wonderful Life (Gonna Have a Good Time)"	J. Fisher, Chris Dowd, Moore	It's a Wonderful Life (1987)	3:03
9.	"Freddie's Dead"	Curtis Mayfield	Truth and Soul (1988)	4:29
10.	"Ma and Pa"	Moore, Jones	Truth and Soul	3:18
11.	"Bonin' in the Boneyard"	Moore, J. Fisher, Kahne	Truth and Soul	4:44
12.	"Change"	Jones, Dowd	Truth and Soul	2:56
13.	"Fight the Youth" (Edited Version)	Jones, J. Fisher, Philip Fisher	The Reality of My Surroundings (1991)	4:01
14.	"Sunless Saturday"	Jones	The Reality of My Surroundings	4:17
15.	"Everyday Sunshine" (Edited Version)	Dowd	The Reality of My Surroundings	3:57
16.	"Lemon Meringue"	J. Fisher	Give a Monkey a Brain and He'll Swear He's the Center of the Universe (1993)	6:10
17.	"Black Flowers" (Edited Version)	Dowd	Give a Monkey a Brain and He'll Swear He's the Center of the Universe	4:34
18.	"Unyielding Conditioning" (Edited Version)	Jones	Give a Monkey a Brain and He'll Swear He's the Center of the Universe	3:59

Disc Two
No.	Title	Writer(s)	Length
1.	"Skankin' to the Beat"	Jones, Walter A. Kibby II	3:29
2.	"Lyin' Ass Bitch" (Alternate Version)	Grant, Jones, Moore	4:25
3.	"Mister Zero"	Fishbone	2:35
4.	"Alcoholic" (Early Demo)	Fishbone	4:51
5.	"Fishbone (Is Red Hot)"	Fishbone	2:49
6.	"Pink Vapor Stew" (Demo version of "Party at Ground Zero")	Jones, Moore, J. Fisher	6:34
7.	"And They Prey on You"	Fishbone	5:22
8.	"Poem Dance / Instrumental"	Fishbone	3:42
9.	"Game of Destruction" (Demo version of "Pressure")	Fishbone	3:50
10.	"Glow in the Dark"	Fishbone	5:17
11.	"What Have I Done"	Fishbone	5:14
12.	"Skankin' to the Beat" (Alternate Version)	Jones, Kibby	2:51
13.	"? (Modern Industry)" (Alternate Version)	Kahne, Jones	3:39
14.	"Slick Nick, You Devil You"	Dowd, Moore	4:40
15.	"Iration"	Jones, J. Fisher	4:36
16.	"Just Call Me Scrooge"	Moore, Kibby	2:31
17.	"Love and Bullshit"	Moore, Kibby	1:58
18.	"The Goose"	George Clinton, Eddie Hazel	5:19

== Personnel ==
- Angelo Moore – saxophone, vocals
- Walter A. Kibby II – trumpet, vocals
- Kendall Jones – guitar, vocals
- Chris Dowd – keyboards, trombone, vocals
- John Norwood Fisher – bass, vocals
- Philip "Fish" Fisher – drums
- John Bigham – keyboards, guitar, vocals (on songs released in 1990 and thereafter)
