= Singles (Fishbone album) =

Compilation album by Fishbone
- Released: 1993
- Genre: Ska punk. funk metal, alternative rock, alternative metal
- Label: Sony

Singles is a compilation album by the American ska punk band Fishbone. It was released on October 22, 1993.

== Track listing ==
No.	Title	Writer(s)	Length
1.	"Swim" (Edit)	J Bigham	4:13
2.	"Freddie's Dead" (Live)	Curtis Mayfield	5:43
3.	"Those Days Are Gone" (Live)	C Dowd, JN Fisher	6:30
4.	"Fight the Youth" (Live)	K Jones, JN Fisher, P Fisher	5:06
5.	"Party at Ground Zero"	K Jones, A Moore, J Fisher	6:30
6.	"? (Modern Industry)" (Dance Mix)	D Kahne, K Jones	6:03
7.	"When Problems Arise" (Mix Is Risen)	K Jones, P Fisher, D Kahne	4:59
8.	"It's a Wonderful Life (Gonna Have a Good Time)"	JN Fisher, C Dowd, A Moore	3:04
9.	"Freddie's Dead" (Zeoniq Mix)	Curtis Mayfield	7:04
10.	"Ma and Pa"	A Moore, K Jones	3:19
11.	"New and Improved Bonin'"	A Moore, J Fisher, D Kahne	4:57
12.	"Fishy Swa Ska"	K Jones, A Moore	4:28
13.	"Everyday Sunshine"	C Dowd	4:57
14.	"Fight the Youth" (Extended)	K Jones, J Fisher, P Fisher	4:01
15.	"Unyielding Conditioning" (Edit)	K Jones	4:01
