= Party at Ground Zero =

Single by Fishbone

from the EP Fishbone
- Released: 1985
- Recorded: Sunset Sound Factory and Eldorado in 1985
- Genre: New wave, ska-punk
- Length: 6:31
- Label: Columbia
- Songwriters: John Norwood Fisher; Kendall Jones; Angelo Moore
- Producer: David Kahne

Fishbone singles chronology
"? (Modern Industry)" (1985)	"Party at Ground Zero" (1985)	"When Problems Arise" (1986)

"Party at Ground Zero" is a song by the ska punk band Fishbone. A demo version titled "Pink Vapor Stew" can be found on the Fishbone 101 compilation. Fishbone performed the song in the movie The Tripper and was featured in the 1994 movie Camp Nowhere.

== Music video ==
The music video for "Party at Ground Zero" was directed by Henry Selick, future director of The Nightmare Before Christmas. The video is a homage to The Masque of the Red Death, with Death bringing about a nuclear explosion when he removes his mask.

Still frames from the video are featured on the cover of the song's 12-inch single.

== Reception ==
John Leland at Spin said, "If Count Basie had had a mohawk and a ska obsession, he might have made blitzoid records with the manic silliness of this latest from the 'bone. "Party at Ground Zero" is souped-up big band swing on top of a zany rhythmic sprint that passes for a groove. A couple of bars, and the thing is off to the races."

== Track listing ==
A Side

1. "Party At Ground Zero (Vapor Mix)" - 7:02
2. "Party At Ground Zero (Visual Mix)" - 4:50

B Side

1. "Skankin' To The Beat" - 3:11

== Accolades ==
Year	Publication	Country	Accolade	Rank
2008	97X	United States	"The 500 Best Modern Rock Songs of All Time"	397
"*" denotes an unordered list.
