= The Goose =

Single by Parliament

Single by Parliament

from the album Up for the Down Stroke
- A-side: "The Goose Part 1"
- B-side: "The Goose Part 2"
- Released: 1974
- Genre: Funk; R&B
- Length: 9:09 (album version)
- Label: Casablanca; NEB 0003
- Songwriter(s): George Clinton; Eddie Hazel
- Producer(s): George Clinton

"The Goose" is a song by the funk band Parliament. It was released as a two-part single, the group's first on their new label Casablanca Records. It was also a track on their 1974 album Up for the Down Stroke. The song failed to chart.

Like "Testify", "The Goose" was borrowed from the repertoire of bandleader and producer George Clinton's earlier doo-wop group The Parliaments. The lyrics use the story of the goose that laid the golden eggs as an eccentric metaphor for romantic attachment, an early instance of the references to fairy tales and nursery rhymes that would continue in Parliament's later releases.

This song was covered by the funk-rock band Fishbone and is included on their 1996 compilation album Fishbone 101: Nuttasaurusmeg Fossil Fuelin' the Fonkay.
