= Ma and Pa =

Single by Fishbone

from the album Truth and Soul
- Released: 1989
- Recorded: 1987 & 1988 at Sunset Sound Factory in Hollywood, California
- Length: 3:22
- Label: Columbia
- Songwriters: Kendall Jones; Angelo Moore
- Producer: David Kahne

Fishbone singles chronology
"Freddie's Dead" (1988)	"Ma and Pa" (1989)	"Fight the Youth" (1991)

Music video
- "Ma and Pa" on YouTube

"Ma and Pa" is a song by American ska and funk metal band Fishbone. It was the second single released from the album Truth and Soul. The song only managed to chart in the UK, but remains a fan favorite and a staple of the band's live shows to the present day.

== Lyrical content ==
The song's upbeat ska-based melody stands in direct contrast to its stark lyrical content which relates the story of a married couple's divorce difficulties as they fight for custody over their daughter. The song's lyrics are narrated by singer Angelo Moore from the point of view of an older brother in the troubled family who witnesses his sister's difficult position in the parents' fierce legal battle. The lyrics lament the girl's feelings at being caught in the middle of the divorce and berates the insensitive parents for not noticing her feelings. The chorus repeats the line "Hey Ma and Pa/What the hell is wrong with y'all." In a refrain which occasionally follows the main chorus, Angelo Moore sings the line "Why don't y'all get your shit/together" by coughing instead of saying the word "shit", effectively self-censoring the song's strongest profanity.

== Music video ==
A music video for the song was directed by Mike Lipscombe with lighting designed by Neil Jerram of Failsafe Systems. The video features live footage of Fishbone performing in a small concert venue on South Parade Pier in Southsea, with the studio-produced song synced over the footage. The video features frantic editing and camera movement and includes first-person footage of the camera attached to Walter A. Kibby II's trumpet, Chris Dowd's swinging keyboard mount, and Norwood Fisher's bass. There are also shots of Angelo Moore crowd surfing and an exuberant fan wrestling with stage hands who are trying to remove him from the stage proscenium.

== Reception ==
Mentions of the song in contemporary reviews of Truth and Soul were generally positive, pointing out the song's sincere lyrics and upbeat musical vibe and frantic dance groove. Tom Moon of the Miami Herald complimented the song's writing and lyrical arrangement saying how "the five-piece band states a theme and develops it [with] each verse adding to the snowballing exposition." He also called the song's dance-groove "slippery." David Silverman of the Chicago Tribune said of the song that "Kibby and Dowd provided a steady line of the lush hornwork." Jon Bream of the Star Tribune called it a "first-rate song about divorce from a kid's point of view." Malu Halasa, reviewer of British music newspaper Record Mirror, found some "nice horn licks" here but generally she considered that the Fishbone forgot to bring the "vitality on the vinyl" while copying "English 2-Tone of the early Eighties".

== Track listing ==
A Side

1. "Ma and Pa" – 3:22

B Side

1. "Bonin' in the Boneyard" – 4:45

== Charts ==
Chart	Peak
UK Singles	95
