= Set the Booty Up Right =

EP by Fishbone
- Released: October 5, 1990
- Recorded: 1988, 1990
- Length: 18:54
- Label: Columbia
- Producer: David Kahne; Fishbone; Carmen Rizzo; The Jungle Brothers

Fishbone chronology
| Truth and Soul (1988) | Set the Booty Up Right (1990) | The Reality of My Surroundings (1991) |

Professional ratings
Review scores
| Source | Rating |
|---|---|
| AllMusic | 3/5 stars |
| Robert Christgau | (choice cut) |

Set the Booty Up Right is a five-song EP released by the ska/funk metal/rock band Fishbone in 1990. It was recorded shortly after the band hired former Miles Davis music director John Bigham on guitar and keyboard (though Bigham is not pictured in the band photo on the back cover of the CD). The EP served as a stopgap release for fans, due to production delays for the full album The Reality of My Surroundings, which was released in 1991. The EP features two alternate versions of the song "Bonin' in the Boneyard" (the original version of which is found on the 1988 album Truth and Soul) as well as three new studio tracks. It has long been out of print, but the track "Love and Bullshit" was included on the 1996 retrospective Fishbone 101: Nuttasaurusmeg Fossil Fuelin' the Fonkay.

== Track listing ==
| No. | Title | Writer(s) | Length |
|---|---|---|---|
| 1. | "New and Improved Bonin'" | Angelo Moore, John Fisher, David Kahne | 4:58 |
| 2. | "In the Name of Swing" | Angelo Moore, John Fisher, David Kahne | 2:46 |
| 3. | "Love and Bullshit" | Angelo Moore, Walter Kibby | 1:58 |
| 4. | "Hide Behind My Glasses" | Angelo Moore, Chris Dowd | 4:43 |
| 5. | "Bonin' in the Jungle" | Angelo Moore, John Fisher, David Kahne | 4:29 |

== Personnel ==
Fishbone

- John Bigham - keyboards, guitar
- Chris Dowd - keyboards, trombone, vocals
- Philip "Fish" Fisher - drums
- John Norwood Fisher - bass guitar
- Kendall Jones - guitar
- Walter A. Kibby II - trumpet, vocals
- Angelo Moore - saxophone, vocals

Technical

- Carmen Rizzo - producer (track 1)
- David Kahne - producer (tracks 2, 3 & 4)
- The Jungle Brothers - producer (track 5)

== Accolades ==
| Year | Publication | Country | Accolade | Rank |
|---|---|---|---|---|
| 1990 | The Village Voice | United States | "Albums of the Year (EP)" | 7 |
