= Still Stuck in Your Throat =

Still Stuck In Your Throat

Studio album by Fishbone
- Released: October 16, 2006
- Recorded: October 2005–March 2006
- Studio: Chung King Studios
- Genre: Ska; punk rock; funk
- Length: 55:17
- Label: Ter a Terre (Europe); Sound in Color (US)
- Producer: John Norwood Fisher and Jimmy Sloan

Fishbone chronology
Live in Amsterdam (2003)	Still Stuck In Your Throat (2006)	Crazy Glue (2011)

Alternative cover
- Alternative cover

Still Stuck in Your Throat is the seventh studio album by Fishbone, released in Europe on October 16, 2006, and in the United States on April 24, 2007. It was their first album since Fishbone and the Familyhood Nextperience Present: The Psychotic Friends Nuttwerx had been released six years previously, as well as their first to be released on an independent record label. It is also the first album to feature guitarist Rocky George, keyboardist Dre Gipson and trumpeter Curtis Storey, as well as their first to not feature founding member Walter A. Kibby II, who left the band in 2003. Still Stuck in Your Throat was recorded in late 2005 and early 2006 with the support of David Kahne who produced all of Fishbone's recordings during the 1980s and early 1990s. Featuring five songs that were written during the unreleased "Hen House" sessions of 2001 (some songs of which appear on the live recording Live at the Temple Bar and More), the new album also contains six brand new tracks.

== Track listing ==
No.	Title	Writer(s)	Length
1.	"Jack Ass Brigade"	Moore, Fisher	3:37
2.	"Let Dem Ho's Fight"	Moore, Fisher, Steward and Fishbone	2:42
3.	"Skank 'n Go Nuttz"	Fisher	4:58
4.	"Party with Saddam"	Gipson	4:27
5.	"We Just Lose Our Minds"	Fisher	9:42
6.	"Frey'd Fuckin' Nerve Endingz"	Fisher, Moore	4:41
7.	"The Devil Made Me Do It"	Fisher	5:00
8.	"Forever Moore"	Fisher, Moore	3:53
9.	"Behind Closed Doors"	Fisher, Gipson	5:16
10.	"Premadawnutt"	Fisher	4:17
11.	"Faceplant Scorpion Backpinch"	Moore, Fisher	3:13
12.	"Date Rape"	Bradley Nowell and Sublime	3:31

== Personnel ==
=== Fishbone ===
- Angelo Moore – vocals, saxophones, theremin, percussion
- Curtis Storey – trumpet, vocals
- Rocky George – guitar
- John McKnight – keyboards, trombone, guitar, vocals
- Dre Gipson – keyboards, vocals
- John Norwood Fisher – bass guitar, vocals
- John Steward – drums

=== Additional ===
- Jimmy Sloan – slide guitar on "Forever Moore", additional guitar on "Jackass Brigade" and "Faceplant"
- Robbie Gennet – organ on "Forever Moore", piano on "Faceplant"
- Kidd Merv – trumpet on "Forever Moore" and "Faceplant"
- I Timothy – trombone on "Forever Moore" and "Faceplant"
- Kim Manning – background vocals on "We Just Lose Our Minds"
- Bronx Style Bob – harmonies and background vocals on "We Just Lose Our Minds"
- Roger Dexter – announcer on "Let Dem Ho's Fight"

=== Engineers ===
- David Kahne – mixing
- Jimmy Sloan – tracking, recording
- JK Potter – photography
