= Sunless Saturday =

Single by Fishbone

from the album The Reality of My Surroundings
- Released: 1991
- Recorded: November 1990 – January 1991
- Studio: Ocean Way Recording, Hollywood, California
- Genre: Alternative metal; hard rock
- Length: 4:17
- Label: Columbia
- Songwriter: Kendall Jones
- Producer: David Kahne

Fishbone singles chronology
| "Everyday Sunshine" (1991) | "Sunless Saturday" (1991) | "Swim" (1993) |

"Sunless Saturday" is a song by American rock band Fishbone from their 1991 album The Reality of My Surroundings. It remains, to this day, the band's highest charting single.

The music video for the song was directed by Spike Lee.

== Track listing ==
| No. | Title | Writer(s) | Length |
|---|---|---|---|
| 1. | "Sunless Saturday" | Kendall Jones | 4:17 |
| 2. | "Fishy Swa Ska" | Kendall Jones; Angelo Moore | 4:27 |
| 3. | "Understand Me" | Walter A. Kibby II | 4:04 |

== Charts ==
| Chart | Peak |
|---|---|
| U.S. Modern Rock | 7 |
