= Critical Times: Fishbone's Hen House Sessions =

- Music by: Fishbone
- Release date: 2001
- Country: United States
- Language: English

Critical Times: Fishbone's Hen House Sessions is a 2001 DVD release by Fishbone recorded at Hen House Studios, a free community recording studio in Venice, California.

The film centers primarily on the creation, mutation and recording of the songs in the studio - giving a privileged viewpoint as if one were a member of the band. Some members Fishbone felt that they were at a critical moment in the band's history, and that the sessions could lead to a mainstream breakthrough or a total breakdown. The seamless blend of multi-angle cinéma vérité and time lapse photography turns day to night and back again as the band pleads, cajoles, argues and uses every trick in the book to bring their music alive. Critical Times also delves into personal lives, politics, factions in the band and competing musical styles.

== Track listing ==
1. "Frayed Fucking Nerve Endings"
2. "Last Dayz, Critical Times"
3. "Premadawnutt"
4. "Demon in Here"
5. "Skank N' Go Nutts" (alternate cut)

== Personnel ==
- Angelo Moore - saxophone, vocals
- Walter A. Kibby II - trumpet, vocals
- Spacey T - guitar
- John McKnight - keyboards, trombone, guitar
- John Norwood Fisher - bass, vocals
- John Steward - drums
