= Fishbone Live =

Live album by Fishbone
- Released: May 10, 2009
- Recorded: April 23, 2008
- Venue: Bordeaux
- Genre: Ska punk, funk rock
- Label: Ter A Terre

Fishbone chronology
Still Stuck in Your Throat (2007)	Fishbone Live (2009)

Professional ratings
Review scores
Source	Rating
Allmusic	3.5/5 stars

Fishbone Live is the first officially released live album of Fishbone. It contains a 5.1 DVD with companion audio CD of a show filmed April 23, 2008 in Bordeaux, France. It was released worldwide on May 10, 2009. In 2010, the album was pressed on double picture disc vinyl and is for sale via the band's website.

== Track listing ==
DVD track listing
No.	Title	Length
1.	"Unyielding Conditioning"
2.	"The Suffering"
3.	"Behind Closed Doors"
4.	"Bonin’ In The Boneyard"
5.	"Sunless Saturday"
6.	"Date Rape"
7.	"Ma & Pa"
8.	"Party With Saddam"
9.	"Cholly"
10.	"Hide Behind My Glasses"
11.	"Alcoholic"
12.	"Give It Up"
13.	"Party At Ground Zero"
14.	"Spoken Word"
15.	"Everyday Sunshine"
16.	"Lyin' Ass Bitch"
17.	"Freddie’s Dead"
18.	"Servitude"

CD track listing
No.	Title	Length
1.	"Unyielding Conditioning"
2.	"The Suffering"
3.	"Behind Closed Doors"
4.	"Bonin’ In The Boneyard"
5.	"Sunless Saturday"
6.	"Date Rape"
7.	"Ma & Pa"
8.	"Hide Behind My Glasses"
9.	"Give It Up"
10.	"Party At Ground Zero"
11.	"Everyday Sunshine"
12.	"Freddie’s Dead"

== Personnel ==
=== Fishbone ===
- Angelo Moore – Vocals, saxophones, theremin
- Andre´ "Padre" Holmes – trumpet, Vocals, guitar
- Rocky George – guitar
- John McKnight – keyboards, trombone, guitar, Vocals
- Dre Gipson – keyboards, Vocals
- John Norwood Fisher – bass guitar, vocals
- John Steward – drums
