= Live in Amsterdam (Fishbone album) =

Live album by Fishbone
- Released: May 31, 2005
- Label: High Times Records

Fishbone chronology
Live at the Temple Bar and More (2002)	Live in Amsterdam (2005)	Still Stuck in Your Throat (2006)

Professional ratings
Review scores
Source	Rating
Allmusic	3/5 stars

Live in Amsterdam is a live combination CD/DVD set from alternative rock band Fishbone. It was shot and recorded in digital 24 track sound at the Melkweg Theatre in Amsterdam, the Netherlands during the infamous High Times Cannabis Cup Festival in 2002 on the last night of a 14-week tour. High Times Creative Director Steven Hager was the director of the video recording, and Aaron Strebs edited the live 4-camera mix. Interviews for the DVD were shot later by Mike Esterson, producer of the CD and DVD.

The album contains songs from Fishbone's entire 23-year career, from the early 1980s ska classic "Skankin' to the Beat" to the later metal/soul infused "AIDS & Armageddon". The complete concert is featured as an audio concert on disc one and a full live concert DVD on disc two.

== Track listing ==
No.	Title	Length
1.	"X-Quewz Mee, Dr. Madd Vibe, Emergency House Call Pull-Ease"	7:15
2.	"Alcoholic"	5:10
3.	"Just Allow"	3:32
4.	"In the Heat of Angrrr"	4:27
5.	"AIDS & Armageddon"	8:59
6.	"Are U Wit It?"	8:11
7.	"Cholly"	3:42
8.	"Ma & Pa"	3:57
9.	"Skankin’ to the Beat"	3:28
10.	"Premadawnutt"	5:24
11.	"Chim Chim’s Bad Ass Revenge"	4:23
12.	"Bonin’ in the Boneyard"	5:05
13.	"Sunless Saturday"	5:09
14.	"Swim"	9:04

== Personnel ==
- Angelo Moore - saxophone, vocals
- Walter A. Kibby II - trumpet, vocals
- Spacey T - guitar
- John Norwood Fisher - bass guitar, vocals
- John Steward - drums
