= Swim (Fishbone song) =

Single by Fishbone

from the album Give a Monkey a Brain and He'll Swear He's the Center of the Universe
- Released: 1993
- Studio: One on One (Los Angeles)
- Length: 4:42
- Label: Columbia
- Songwriter: John Bigham
- Producers: Terry Date; Fishbone

Fishbone singles chronology
"Sunless Saturday" (1991)	"Swim" (1993)	"Unyielding Conditioning" (1993)

"Swim" is a song by American rock band Fishbone. It was released as the first single from their fourth studio album, Give a Monkey a Brain and He'll Swear He's the Center of the Universe. The song is in a heavy metal style and was written by guitarist John Bigham.

== Reception ==
Although the song did not chart in the US, it was included in the film Last Action Hero, which the soundtrack reached #7 on the Billboard charts. It also had some minor success in the UK, where it peaked at No. 54.

== Music video ==
The music video for the song was directed by Rusty Cundieff. The video features the band performing in swimming gear in front of a crowd frolicking in a pool.

== Track listing ==
No.	Title	Length
1.	"Swim" (Single Mix)	4:14
2.	"Swim" (Ofishal Extended Remix)	5:39
3.	"Swim" (T. Ray H2O Mix)	4:59
4.	"Swim" (JB Dub Mix)	6:15

== Charts ==
Chart (1993)	Peak position
UK Singles (OCC)	54
