= King Cotton (performer) =

American singer

King Cotton is the stage name of Dicky Sony, an American Texas blues singer born in 1945 in Navasota, Texas, United States. He was the lead vocalist and founding member of the blues/rock band Navasota in 1969. ^{[Expand on band members & history with Steely Dan and ABC Records. See Talkpage.]}

King Cotton achieved particular notoriety in the past two decades due to his appearance with John Cusack and Tim Robbins in the 1988 film Tapeheads. Most notable about his role as Roscoe (the "Chicken and waffles" king) is his end-titles song "Roscoe's Rap", which has become a cult favorite on YouTube.com. He also appeared in the 1989 film Blaze starring Paul Newman as Louisiana Governor Earl Long.
