= It's a Wonderful Life (EP) =

EP by Fishbone
- Released: 1987
- Recorded: 1987
- Length: 14:52
- Label: Columbia
- Producer: David Kahne

Fishbone chronology
In Your Face (1986)	It's a Wonderful Life (1987)	Truth and Soul (1988)

Professional ratings
Review scores
Source	Rating
Robert Christgau	B+

It's a Wonderful Life is a four-song Christmas extended play (EP) release by the alternative rock band Fishbone in 1987. The EP quickly went out of print, but its four songs were preserved on the 1996 retrospective Fishbone 101: Nuttasaurusmeg Fossil Fuelin' the Fonkay and the title track was featured on the 2003 greatest hits compilation album The Essential Fishbone.

== Track listing ==
Side A
No.	Title	Writer(s)	Length
1.	"It's a Wonderful Life (Gonna Have a Good Time)"	John Norwood Fisher, Chris Dowd, Angelo Moore	3:02
2.	"Slick Nick, You Devil You"	Chris Dowd, Angelo Moore	4:40

Side B
No.	Title	Writer(s)	Length
3.	"Iration"	Kendall Jones, Philip Fisher, Chris Dowd	4:38
4.	"Just Call Me Scrooge"	Walter Kibby II, Angelo Moore	2:32

== Personnel ==
Fishbone

- Angelo Moore – saxophone, vocals
- Walter A. Kibby II – trumpet, vocals
- Kendall Jones – guitar
- Chris Dowd – keyboard, trombone, vocals
- John Norwood Fisher – bass guitar
- Philip "Fish" Fisher – drums
