= Tapeheads =

1988 film by Bill Fishman

- Original film poster
- Directed by: Bill Fishman
- Written by: Bill Fishman; Peter McCarthy
- Produced by: Peter McCarthy; Michael Nesmith
- Starring: John Cusack; Tim Robbins
- Cinematography: Bojan Bazelli
- Edited by: Mondo Jenkins
- Music by: Fishbone
- Production company: NBC Productions
- Distributed by: Avenue Pictures (Note: De Laurentiis Entertainment Group was credited as distributor at the film's premiere at the U.S. Film Festival)
- Release dates: January 22, 1988 (U.S. Film Festival); October 21, 1988 (United States)
- Running time: 93 minutes
- Country: United States
- Language: English
- Budget: $3 million
- Box office: $343,786

Tapeheads is a 1988 American comedy film directed by Bill Fishman and starring John Cusack, Tim Robbins, Clu Gulager, Doug McClure, Jessica Walter, Mary Crosby, Sam Moore and Junior Walker. The film was produced by Michael Nesmith, who briefly appears as a bottled water delivery man.

The film premiered at the Sundance Film Festival (then known as the U.S. Film Festival) on January 22, 1988, with De Laurentiis Entertainment Group attached as distributor and a tentative release date of March 1988. However, due to financial concerns, distribution rights reverted to NBC Productions, which sold them to Avenue Pictures. The film was ultimately released on October 21, 1988 and was pulled from theaters only two weeks into its theatrical run. A poll of theater patrons by Avenue concluded that the film's underperformance could be attributed to the company's marketing campaign, which was described as "too hip and selective" and aimed to promote the film as more of a slapstick comedy.

== Plot ==
After losing their jobs as security guards, best friends Ivan and Josh start a music video production company called "Video Aces". When they meet their childhood heroes, 1970s soul duo Swanky Modes, Ivan and Josh concoct a scheme to give them a new audience by hijacking a Menudo concert, getting them to perform in Menudo's place, and broadcasting it live across the country on a television satellite hook-up.

The movie also features a fake ad spot for a real Los Angeles restaurant, Roscoe's House of Chicken 'n Waffles. Notable appearances in the film include: Mary Crosby, of the soap opera Dallas; character actors Clu Gulager and Doug McClure; football player Lyle Alzado; 1960s actress Connie Stevens; Soul Train host Don Cornelius; singer Courtney Love; Navasota singer King Cotton; original "Human Beat-Box" Doug E. Fresh; ska-punk band Fishbone (who also perform the incidental score) as "Ranchbone"; The Dead Boys and The Lords of the New Church singer Stiv Bators; Ted Nugent; "Weird Al" Yankovic; and Dead Kennedys singer Jello Biafra, in a cameo as an FBI agent.

== Cast ==
- John Cusack as Ivan Alexeev
- Tim Robbins as Josh Tager
- Mary Crosby as Samantha Gregory
- Clu Gulager as Senator Norman Mart
- Katy Boyer as Belinda Mart
- Jessica Walter as Kay Mart
- Sam Moore as Billy Diamond
- Junior Walker as Lester Diamond
- Susan Tyrrell as Nikki Morton
- Doug McClure as Sid Tager
- Connie Stevens as June Tager
- King Cotton as Roscoe
- Don Cornelius as Mo Fuzz
- Lee Arenberg as Norton
- Xander Berkeley as Ricky Fell
- "Weird Al" Yankovic as himself
- Zander Schloss as Heavy Metal Fan
- Martha C. Quinn as RVTV-VJ
- Ted Nugent as Rock Star
- Jello Biafra as FBI Man #1
- Bob McLean as FBI Man #2
- Courtney Love (uncredited) as Norman's Spanker
- Stiv Bators as Dick Slammer
- Bob Goldthwait (credited as Jack Cheese) as Don Druzel
- David Anthony Higgins as Visual Aplomb
- Steve Higgins as Visual Aplomb
- Michael Nesmith as Water Man
- Jennifer Balgobin as Calypso Dancer
- Sy Richardson as The Bartender
- Brie Howard as Flygirl
- Billy Davis as Swanky Modes Band Member, Guitar
- Lyle Alzado as Conan the Tour Guide
- Tyra Ferrell as Flygirl

== Soundtrack ==
The music supervisor for the film was Nigel Harrison. The soundtrack album was released on Island Records.

No.	Title	Artist	Length
1.	"Ordinary Man"	Swanky Modes (Sam Moore and Junior Walker)	2:53
2.	"Roscoe's Rap"	King Cotton	4:26
3.	"Surfer's Love Chant"	Bo Diddley	4:56
4.	"You Hooked Me Baby"	Swanky Modes	3:32
5.	"Betcher Bottom Dollar"	Swanky Modes	2:20
6.	"Baby Doll (Sung in Swedish)"	Devo	3:36
7.	"Slow Bus A-Movin' (Howard's Beach Party)"	Fishbone ("Ranchbone")	2:39
8.	"Audience for My Pain"	Swanky Modes	4:22
9.	"Language of Love"	Swanky Modes	3:00
10.	"Ordinary Man (Can't Keep a Good Man Down Mix)"	Swanky Modes	4:19

The film's soundtrack (but not the soundtrack album) includes the song "Repave America" written and performed by Tim Robbins, credited as "Bob Roberts" four years before that movie was released. "Repave America" also appears on the Bob Roberts soundtrack with the lyrics slightly altered to become "Retake America".

== Reception ==
On the review aggregator website Rotten Tomatoes, 60% of 15 critics' reviews are positive, with an average rating of 5.6/10.

=== Critical response ===
Roger Ebert of The Chicago Sun Times wrote: "The formula is ageless. We start with a couple of guys who were buddies in the old neighborhood. They want to make it in show business."

Chris Willman of the Los Angeles Times wrote: "It’s to the credit of Fishman and producer/co-writer Peter McCarthy that they keep terminal wiseacres Ivan and Josh as likable as they are profane. (The movie’s R rating was earned.) In a banal way, fast-talking impresario Cusack and the more disheveled Robbins neatly symbolize the symbiotic relationship of commerce and art. But more importantly, they’re credible as white baby-boomers who had their middle-class destinies completely usurped during their Wonder years by the divine appearance of black acts like the Swanky Modes. Tapeheads has almost as much soul as it does good, cheap laughs."

Janet Maslin of The New York Times wrote: "Tapeheads sees the world of commercial video production as a new frontier, a wild and woolly place where rules don't exist yet and the pioneering spirit still prevails. It's a funny idea, one that might have been more so if the film had worked solely in that satirical vein. As it is, Tapeheads tacks on various cliched elements of intrigue - there's a blackmail plot against a political candidate - that dilute its humor. It works best when it's simply sending up the tricks of the video trade."

Jim Knipfel of Den of Geek wrote: "Cult movies have been with us for a very long time. As a cultural phenomenon, they really began to emerge on college campuses in the mid-’60s. Difference back then was, those films which earned themselves a small but rabid following weren’t intended to be weird or quirky in any way. Most of them had been released initially with a solidly mainstream audience in mind."
