= The Reality of My Surroundings =

Studio album by Fishbone
- Released: April 23, 1991
- Recorded: November 1990 – January 1991
- Studio: Ocean Way (Hollywood, California); Studio 55 (Hollywood); Summa (West Hollywood); Capitol (Hollywood)
- Genre: Funk metal; funk rock
- Length: 59:39
- Label: Columbia
- Producer: Fishbone, David Kahne

Fishbone chronology
Set the Booty Up Right (1990)	The Reality of My Surroundings (1991)	Give a Monkey a Brain and He'll Swear He's the Center of the Universe (1993)

Singles from The Reality of My Surroundings
- 1. "Fight the Youth" Released: 1991; 2. "Everyday Sunshine" Released: 1991; 3. "Sunless Saturday" Released: 1991

The Reality of My Surroundings is the third studio album by the American rock band Fishbone, released on April 23, 1991, by Columbia Records.

== Background and recording ==
The Reality of My Surroundings was recorded after the band had achieved breakthrough success in 1988 following a stint opening for Red Hot Chili Peppers, which had contributed to their album Truth and Soul (1988) charting in the Billboard 200. They had also appeared in the film Tapeheads that year at the suggestion of star John Cusack.

The band spent most of 1989 composing the songs for the album, which contain elements of funk, rock, reggae, hard rock, punk rock and a new focus on heavy metal-inspired guitars. Basic tracks for the album were recorded in Hollywood at Ocean Way Recording, with overdubs done at Ocean Way, Studio 55, Summa and Capitol Studios. All four "If I Were A...I'd" tracks were recorded live.

AllMusic writer Greg Prato notes that the material is "unpredictable" and "off-the-wall" in comparison to its more "straightforward" predecessor. "So Many Millions" contains the line, "I cannot get over legitimately, the reality of my surroundings do not point to the sky, so why even try", which Newsday writer Martin Johnson observed "captures the pall that lingers over much of the recording".

The Reality of My Surroundings was Fishbone's first album to feature former Miles Davis music director John Bigham (guitar, keyboards), who joined the band in 1989 during the Truth and Soul tour. Following this album's release, guitarist Kendall Jones left the band.

== Release and reception ==
Professional ratings
Review scores
Source	Rating
AllMusic	4.5/5 stars
Robert Christgau	(dud)
The Encyclopedia of Popular Music	4/5 stars
Entertainment Weekly	A−
Rolling Stone	3.5/5 stars

The album was a critical and commercial success, peaking at No. 49 on the Billboard 200 on May 18, 1991. Due to the sudden implementation of Nielsen SoundScan tracking figures on the Billboard charts, The Reality of My Surroundings sharply dropped to No. 182 in two weeks. The album ultimately spent ten weeks on the Billboard 200, and by 1997 the album had sold nearly 200,000 copies in the United States. The album was promoted with three single releases: "Fight the Youth", whose music video was given exposure on MTV, followed by "Everyday Sunshine" and "Sunless Saturday".

The album is widely considered by fans and critics as the creative peak of the band. People called The Reality of My Surroundings Fishbone's most impressive album. Trouser Press wrote that "the sprawling [album] reprises much of Truth and Soul‘s spirit and sound, but is far more ambitious in scope and philosophy." Several critics likened the album to the Beatles' Sgt. Pepper's Lonely Hearts Club Band (1967).

Fishbone experienced a large growth in concert tickets and record sales during this period, making two memorable television appearances: performing "Sunless Saturday" and "Everyday Sunshine" on Saturday Night Live, and the latter on The Arsenio Hall Show.

== Track listing ==
No.	Title	Writer(s)	Length
1.	"Fight the Youth"	John Norwood Fisher, Philip Fisher, Kendall Jones	5:01
2.	"If I Were A...I'd"	Chris Dowd, Angelo Moore	0:54
3.	"So Many Millions"	J. N. Fisher, Moore	5:50
4.	"Asswhippin'"	John Bigham, Dowd, J. N. Fisher, P. Fisher, Jones, Walter A. Kibby II, Moore	0:40
5.	"Housework"	J. N. Fisher, P. Fisher, Jones, Kibby, Moore	4:46
6.	"Death March"	Dowd, Moore	0:34
7.	"Behavior Control Technician"	J. N. Fisher, P. Fisher	3:09
8.	"If I Were A...I'd"	Dowd, Moore	0:29
9.	"Pressure"	Jones, Moore	4:47
10.	"Junkies Prayer"	Dowd, J. N. Fisher, Jones, Moore, Byron West	3:01
11.	"Pray to the Junkiemaker"	Dowd, Moore	4:03
12.	"Everyday Sunshine"	Dowd, Moore	4:57
13.	"If I Were A...I'd"	Dowd, Moore	0:29
14.	"Naz-Tee May'en"	J. N. Fisher, P. Fisher, Jones, Moore	4:56
15.	"Babyhead"	Kibby	5:31
16.	"If I Were A...I'd"	Dowd, Moore	0:53
17.	"Those Days Are Gone"	Dowd, J. N. Fisher	5:23
18.	"Sunless Saturday"	Jones	4:18

== Personnel ==
Credits adapted from CD liner notes.

Fishbone

- Angelo Moore
- Chris Dowd
- Walter A. Kibby II
- John Norwood Fisher
- Kendall Jones
- Fish
- John Bigham

Additional musicians

- Fernando Pullum – trumpet
- Sam Mims – keyboard programming
- T-Bone – percussion
- Greg Bell, Vicky Calhoun, Aklia Chin, Katherine Cederquist, Jeff Conners, Larry Fishburne, James Grey, Kyva Holmes, Nadja Holmes, Wendell Holmes, Natalie Jackson, Gaz Mayall, Sultana Muhammad, Susan Rogers, Clip Payne, Susan Stoval, Kristen Vigard, Byron West – background vocals

Technical

- Fishbone – producers
- David Kahne – producer
- Larry Duhart – engineer
- Joel Stoner – additional engineering
- Clark Germain – additional engineering
- Dan Bosworth – assistant engineer
- Mark Guilbeault – assistant engineer
- Steve Holroyd – assistant engineer
- Clif Norrell – assistant engineer
- Rail Rogut – assistant engineer
- Eric Rudd – assistant engineer
- Richard Engstrom – assistant engineer
- Ken Felton – assistant engineer
- Kyle Beff – assistant engineer
- Randy Wine – assistant engineer
- Sylvia Massy – assistant engineer
- Chris Theis – assistant engineer
- Michael Brauer – mixing (1–3, 7, 11, 12, 18)
- Thom Panunzio – mixing (2, 4–6, 8, 10, 13, 16)
- Ron St. Germain – live engineer (2, 8, 13, 16)
- Niko Bolas – mixing (9, 17)
- Byron West – mixing (14, 15)
- Wally Traugott – mastering
- Stacy Drummond – art direction, design
- Max Aguilera-Hellweg – photography
- Kendall – handwriting

== Accolades ==
Year	Publication	Country	Accolade	Rank
1991	Rock de Lux	Spain	"Albums of the Year"	2
1991	OOR	Netherlands	"Albums of the Year"	40
"*" denotes an unordered list.

== Charts ==
Album – Billboard (United States)

Year	Chart	Position
1991	Billboard 200	49

Singles – Billboard (United States)

Year	Single	Chart	Position
1991	"Sunless Saturday"	Modern Rock Tracks	7
1991	"Everyday Sunshine"	Modern Rock Tracks	14
