= Stockholm Syndrome (Fishbone album) =

Studio album by Fishbone
- Released: 27 June 2025
- Genres: Ska, punk rock, funk
- Length: 43:02
- Label: self-released
- Producers: Fishbone, Aryon Davis, Chris McGrew

Fishbone chronology
Fishbone (2023)	Stockholm Syndrome (2025)

Stockholm Syndrome is the eighth album by the American band Fishbone, released on June 27, 2025. After several EPs, it is the band's first full-length album in 19 years and their first to not include founding bassist John Norwood Fisher; it also marks the return of guitarist Tracey “Spacey T” Singleton who had previously left the band in 2003. The album was produced by the band with Aryon Davis and Chris McGrew.

== Background ==
Stockholm Syndrome is the first Fishbone album after a significant upheaval in the band's lineup in 2024, which saw the departure of founding members John Norwood Fisher and Walt Kibby, plus longtime drummer John Steward. The remaining founding members Angelo Moore and Christopher Dowd quickly assembled a new lineup with returning guitarist Tracey “Spacey T” Singleton, plus new members Hassan Hurd, JS Williams, and James Jones.

Moore said of the revamped lineup: "These guys are brand new, no baggage, no past, a fresh contribution to Fishbone. It gives us a brand new perspective… They’re translating what Fishbone has done and what Fishbone is now." Moore also explained the new album's title, referencing the Stockholm Syndrome psychological condition in which a prisoner does not realize that they are imprisoned, and compared this to group relations within the previous lineup. When describing the new lineup, Spin magazine said "Fishbone sounds as extravagant and eclectic as ever, still envisioning punk and metal as Black music by incorporating the syncopations and harmonies of ska, funk, doo-wop, soul, and early R&B."

The first song recorded by the new lineup was "Racist Piece of Shit", denouncing Donald Trump, which was released as a single in October 2024 to preview the new album. Another advance single, "Last Call in America", featuring George Clinton, was released in April 2025.

== Reception ==
The album received generally favorable reviews, with most noting the continuation of Fishbone's defined sound combined with a focus on current events in their lyrics. According to In Spite magazine, "This album is Fishbone in 2025: unblinking, unrelenting, and unwilling to pull punches when it comes to the state of the world, politics, and the suffocating realities that surround us." Punk Rock Mag called the album "a triumph—an album that doesn’t just live up to Fishbone’s legacy, but expands it." Spill magazine noted "By embracing their traditional sound, the band has returned with their most exhilarating album in decades as they once again ask their audience to follow them into the unpredictability of the unknown."

In another positive review of the album, Out of the Blue magazine concluded "Fishbone is just as full-force as ever before. Just as explorative and dynamic and youthful without a fear of showing age." According to With Guitars magazine, "Stockholm Syndrome tackles racism, economic disparity, state violence, media manipulation, and spiritual survival with fearless lyrics and feral energy. A somewhat less enthusiastic review from The Rockpit noted that the album is "a wonderful and smooth soundtrack that is a joy to listen to there are no absolutely monster moments."

== Track listing ==
No.	Title	Length
1.	"Last Call in America"	3:21
2.	"Adolescent Regressive Behavior"	2:29
3.	"Dog Eat Dog"	4:09
4.	"Suckered by Sabotage"	4:57
5.	"Secret Police"	4:27
6.	"Gelato the Clown"	4:06
7.	"Why Do We Keep on Dying"	3:09
8.	"Hellhounds on My Trail"	2:31
9.	"Racist Piece of Shit"	2:45
10.	"Living on the Upside Down"	3:13
11.	"All About Us"	3:06
12.	"Love Is Love"	4:47
Total length:		43:02

== Personnel ==
- Angelo Moore – vocals, saxophones, theremin, percussion
- Christopher Dowd – keyboards, trombone, vocals
- Tracey "Spacey T" Singleton – guitar
- Hassan Hurd – drums
- JS Williams – trumpet, vocals
- James Jones – bass
