= Everyday Sunshine =

Rock 'n' roll Song

Single by Fishbone

from the album The Reality of My Surroundings
- Released: 1991
- Recorded: November 1990 – January 1991
- Studio: Ocean Way Recording, Hollywood, California
- Length: 4:57
- Label: Columbia
- Songwriter(s): Chris Dowd, Angelo Moore
- Producer(s): David Kahne

Fishbone singles chronology
"Fight the Youth" (1991)	"Everyday Sunshine" (1991)	"Sunless Saturday" (1991)

"Everyday Sunshine" is a song by American rock band Fishbone. It was released as the second single from their third album, The Reality of My Surroundings (1991). A music video was made featuring the band playing the song first in an industrial underground complex before switching to a field on a sunny day.

Everyday Sunshine: The Story of Fishbone is also the title of a documentary about the band.

== Track listing ==
A Side

1. "Everyday Sunshine" - 4:57
2. "Fight The Youth" - 5:00

B Side

1. "Fight The Youth (Extended Remix)" - 6:38
2. "Freddie's Dead (Zeoniq Mix)" - 6:54

== Charts ==
Chart	Peak
U.S. Billboard Modern Rock	14
UK Singles	60
