= Truth and Soul =

Studio album by Fishbone
- Released: September 13, 1988
- Recorded: 1987–1988
- Studio: The Sound Factory (Los Angeles)
- Genres: Funk rock; funk metal; hard rock; ska
- Length: 41:38
- Label: Columbia
- Producer: David Kahne

Fishbone chronology
It's a Wonderful Life (1987)	Truth and Soul (1988)	Set the Booty Up Right (1990)

Singles from Truth and Soul
- 1. "Freddie's Dead" Released: 1988; 2. "Ma and Pa" Released: 1988; 3. "Change" Released: 1988; 4. "One Day" Released: 1989

Truth and Soul is the second studio album by American rock band Fishbone. It was released on September 13, 1988. As is typical of the band's history of music the album features a wide array of genres including punk, ska, reggae, soul, funk, and blues. Additionally, Truth and Soul includes the band's earliest foray into hard rock and heavy metal. The album begins with a cover version of Curtis Mayfield's "Freddie's Dead", originally from the soundtrack to the film Super Fly.

== Recording ==
Following the release of the Fishbone EP and In Your Face, the band had completed their original record contract with Columbia Records and renegotiated a new deal that would allow them another full-length album. It was later acknowledged as a sign of how much faith Columbia had in Fishbone at the time to continue to support their records.

Guitarist Kendall Jones was becoming concerned that the band's image was "cartoonish," and reviews of their previous album had criticized the attempt at socially conscious subject matter alongside other absurd frat-rock songs. Meanwhile, Jones was beginning to experiment with heavy rock guitar work, which was influencing Fishbone's new material. These elements together influenced the band to make a more serious album with a consistently socially conscious theme.

== Promotion ==
Domestically, two tracks were released as singles in promotion of the album. The first, "Freddie's Dead", had a music video directed by Douglas Gayeton, and the second, "Ma and Pa", had a video directed by Mike Lipscombe. Additional singles were released in Europe for the songs "Change" and "One Day." Additionally, a promotional EP titled Interchords was released with live versions of six songs from the record followed by excerpts from an interview at KUSF explaining each song's meaning.

== Reception ==
Contemporary reviews of Truth and Soul were generally mixed to positive. David Silverman for the Chicago Tribune gave the album a mixed review saying that the blend of musical styles hurts the album "despite the band's talent." In a separate review for the same newspaper, Chris Heim positively reviewed the record, especially in light of it being only the band's sophomore effort, calling the record "fresh, assured and bursting with ideas and energy [that] seem like it should come from more experienced musicians." Netherlands music magazine OOR awarded the album as the twenty-second best rock album of the year out of 154 entries.

Retrospective reviews were generally positive. Reviewing the album for AllMusic, Greg Prato awarded the album four-and-a-half stars out of five and noted that, as Fishbone's first significant use of hard rock, guitarist Kendall Jones' guitar-playing yielded "often-spectacular results." Robert Christgau gave the album a B rating and said that he didn't think the album flowed well when taken as a whole, but that each song on its own could "change any radio station's pace quite satisfactorily." Additionally, the album was awarded four-out-of-five stars in 2004's The New Rolling Stone Album Guide. Music critic Tom Moon called the album one of his "1000 Recordings to Hear Before You Die" and Robert Dimery listed it as one of his 1001 Albums You Must Hear Before You Die.

== Track listing ==
No.	Title	Writer(s)	Length
1.	"Freddie's Dead"	Curtis Mayfield	4:31
2.	"Ma and Pa"	Angelo Moore, Kendall Jones	3:19
3.	"Question of Life"	Moore, Jones, John Norwood Fisher	3:02
4.	"Pouring Rain"	Chris Dowd	5:13
5.	"Deep Inside"	Moore, Fisher	1:22
6.	"Mighty Long Way"	Fisher	3:26
7.	"I Like to Hide Behind My Glasses" (only included on European CD release)	Dowd, Moore	4:43
8.	"Bonin' in the Boneyard"	Moore, Fisher, David Kahne	4:44
9.	"One Day"	Walter Kibby, Jones, Kahne	4:34
10.	"Subliminal Fascism"	Moore	1:28
11.	"Slow Bus Movin' (Howard Beach Party)"	Jones, Moore, Kibby, Philip "Fish" Fisher	2:38
12.	"In the Name of Swing" (only included on European CD release)	Moore, Fisher, Kahne	2:46
13.	"Ghetto Soundwave"	Jones	4:24
14.	"Change"	Jones, Dowd	2:58

European CD version comes with a slightly different track listing order as tracks 3 (Question of Life) and 6 (Mighty Long Way) are inverted. Outside of Europe, the album contained only twelve tracks, with "I Like to Hide Behind My Glasses" and "In the Name of Swing" not included. These two tracks from the European CD version would later be released in the US on the EP Set the Booty Up Right.

== Personnel ==
Fishbone

- Chris Dowd – vocals, keyboards, trombone
- John Norwood Fisher – vocals, bass
- Philip "Fish" Fisher – drums, percussion, vocals
- Kendall Jones – vocals, guitar, acoustic guitar
- Walter A. Kibby II – vocals, trumpet
- Angelo Moore – vocals, saxophone

Production

- John Bavin – engineering
- David Kahne – production, engineering
- Larry Ferguson – additional engineering

== Charts ==
Chart (1988)	Peak position
US Billboard 200	153
