= Fishbone and the Familyhood Nextperience Present: The Friendliest Psychosis of All =

EP by Fishbone
- Released: February 19, 2002
- Recorded: 1999–2000
- Length: 29:22
- Label: NUTTSACTOR 5
- Producer: Steve Lindsey & Fishbone

Fishbone chronology
Fishbone and the Familyhood Nextperience Present: The Psychotic Friends Nuttwerx (2000)	Fishbone and the Familyhood Nextperience Present: The Friendliest Psychosis of All (2002)	Live at the Temple Bar and More (2002)

Fishbone and the Familyhood Nextperience Present: The Friendliest Psychosis of All is a three-song EP released by alternative rock band Fishbone in 2002. It features original outtakes from their 2000 album Fishbone and the Familyhood Nextperience Present: The Psychotic Friends Nuttwerx, with cameos from funk pioneer George Clinton, Primus bass guitarist Les Claypool and comedic singer Blowfly.

The final track is a 21-minute spoken word jam led by saxophonist Angelo Moore.

== Track listing ==
No.	Title	Length
1.	"A Friendly Psychosis"	5:05
2.	"Let Dem Hoes Fight (Part 2)"	2:57
3.	"X-Quewz Mee, Dr. Madd Vibe, Emergency House Call Pull-Ease"	21:20

== Personnel ==
- Angelo Moore - saxophone, vocals
- Walter A. Kibby II - trumpet, vocals
- Buckethead - guitar
- Spacey T - guitar
- John McKnight - keyboard, trombone, guitar
- John Norwood Fisher - bass guitar
- John Steward - drums
