= Live at the Temple Bar and More =

Live album by Fishbone
- Released: June 18, 2002
- Genre: Funk; ska; funk metal
- Label: Nuttsactor 5

Fishbone chronology
| Fishbone and the Familyhood Nextperience Present: The Friendliest Psychosis of All (2002) | Live at the Temple Bar and More (2002) | Live in Amsterdam (2005) |

Professional ratings
Review scores
| Source | Rating |
|---|---|
| Allmusic | 2.5/5 stars |
| Rolling Stone | 3/5 stars |

Live at the Temple Bar and More is the first live album from alternative rock band Fishbone. The album was recorded live in various locations throughout August and September 2001.

The album contains all new material never released on any previous Fishbone album. Though the band recorded most of the tracks as part of the 2001 "Hen House" sessions (whose recording process is documented on the unauthorized Critical Times - Fishbone's Hen House Sessions DVD), the band decided to bypass their usual record company hassles by releasing the new songs in a live format on their own independent record label. Although the band suffered considerable record company troubles following the release of their previous three studio albums, the band remained a popular live concert attraction.

== Track listing ==
| No. | Title | Length |
|---|---|---|
| 1. | "Skank N' Go Nutts" | 6:50 |
| 2. | "Are U Wit It?" | 7:43 |
| 3. | "Premadawnutt" | 4:25 |
| 4. | "Demon in Here" | 5:41 |
| 5. | "In the Heat of Angrrr" | 3:54 |
| 6. | "Last Dayz, Critical Times" | 5:02 |
| 7. | "Git Out of the City" | 8:09 |
| 8. | "Down Boy" | 10:38 |

== Personnel ==
- Angelo Moore - saxophone, vocals
- Walter A. Kibby II - trumpet, vocals
- Spacey T - guitar
- John Norwood Fisher - bass guitar, vocals
- John Steward - drums
