= Fishbone and the Familyhood Nextperience Present: The Psychotic Friends Nuttwerx =

Studio album by Fishbone
- Released: March 21, 2000
- Recorded: 1999–2000
- Studio: The Village, Los Angeles, Palindrome Recorder Venice, CA, Sunset Sound, Grand Master Recorders, & Cherokee Recording Studios Hollywood, CA
- Genre: Funk; ska
- Length: 45:01; 48:38 (Japanese version)
- Label: Hollywood
- Producer: Steve Lindsey

Fishbone chronology
Chim Chim's Badass Revenge (1996)	Fishbone and the Familyhood Nextperience Present: The Psychotic Friends Nuttwerx (2000)	Fishbone and the Familyhood Nextperience Present: The Friendliest Psychosis of All (2001)

Professional ratings
Review scores
Source	Rating
AllMusic	4/5 stars
The Encyclopedia of Popular Music	3/5 stars
Kerrang!	4/5 stars
Rolling Stone	3/5 stars

Fishbone and the Familyhood Nextperience Present: The Psychotic Friends Nuttwerx is an album by alternative rock band Fishbone, released in 2000. It features a large number of special guests and is the only Fishbone album released on Disney's Hollywood Records.

Whereas the band's previous album, the angry Chim Chim's Badass Revenge, contained some of the band's heaviest moments, Psychotic Friends Nuttwerx is full of sunny reggae, ska and pop hooks that make it the most accessible Fishbone album to date. The album has cameos from H.R. of Bad Brains, Gwen Stefani, George Clinton, Rose Stone, Rick James, Flea, John Frusciante and Chad Smith of Red Hot Chili Peppers, Durga McBroom, and many others.

While AllMusic called it the band's best album in a decade, it received little support from the band's record label, and Fishbone once again found themselves without a record deal.

"Where'd You Get Those Pants?" uses the same melody as "Weed Plant," another Fishbone song.

== Critical reception ==
LA Weekly called the album "a funk-o-ramic magnum opus." The Chicago Reader wrote that the "jittery, giggly, and thoroughly funky comeback attempt ranges from painstaking old-fashioned hand-constructed R & B to slinky reggae to a loving but violent mangling of Sly & the Family Stone's 'Everybody Is a Star.'"

== Track listing ==
No.	Title	Writer(s)	Length
1.	"Shakey Ground"	Eddie Hazel, Alphonzo Boyd, Jeffrey Bowen	3:46
2.	"The Suffering"	Angelo Moore, Bridget Benante, David Baerwald, Steven Lindsey	5:17
3.	"Where'd You Get Those Pants?"	Moore, Lindsey, Alta Willis, John Norwood Fisher	3:44
4.	"Everybody Is a Star"	Sly Stone	3:51
5.	"One Planet People"	Moore, Walter A. Kibby II, Dallas Austin	5:16
6.	"Just Allow"	Moore, Kibby, Fisher, Tracey Singleton	3:29
7.	"AIDS & Armageddon"	Baerwald	5:58
8.	"It All Kept Startin' Over Again"	Moore, Fisher	5:59
9.	"Dear God"	Fisher, Kibby, Austin, John Bingham	3:46
10.	"Karma Tsunami"	Moore, Fisher, McBroom	3:55
11.	"In the Heat of Anger" (Japanese Release Only)	Moore, Fisher	3:37

== Personnel ==
- Angelo Moore - vocals, saxophone, theremin; drums (#10)
- Walter A. Kibby II - trumpet, vocals
- Spacey T - guitars, vocals
- John McKnight - piano, keyboards, trombone
- John Norwood Fisher - bass guitar, vocals
- John Steward - drums

== Additional Personnel ==
- Lenny Castro, percussion (#1–5,7–10)
- Bronx Style Bob, vocals (#1,5)
- H.R., vocals (#5)
- Donny Osmond, backing vocals (#1)
- Ivan Neville, backing vocals (#1)
- Alexandra Brown, backing vocals (#2–5,7)
- Portia Griffin, backing vocals (#2–5,7)
- Mona Lisa Young, backing vocals (#2–5,7)
- Rose Stone, backing vocals (#4)
- George Clinton, vocals (#4)
- Gwen Stefani, vocals (#4)
- Perry Farrell, backing vocals (#4,8)
- Rick James, vocals (#4)
- Durga McBroom, backing vocals (#10)
- Kandice Lindsey, backing vocals (#10)
- Monica Reed, backing vocals (#10)
- John Frusciante, guitar (#1)
- Jeff 'Skunk' Baxter, guitar (#1)
- Tony Maiden, guitar (#3)
- Ariel Sanzl, guitar (#5)
- Daevid Baerwald, guitar ("Aids & Armageddon")
- Billy Bass Nelson - bass guitar (#1), guitars (#9)
- Flea - bass guitar (#1)
- Chad Smith - drums (#1)
- John Robinson, drums (#2–3,7)
- Abe Laboriel Jr. - drums, loops (#4,5,8,9)
- Dion Murdock, drums (#6,7)
- Walt Fowler, horns (#1–5,7,9)
- Bruce Fowler, horns (#1–5)
- Albert Wing, horns (#1–5)
- Lili Haydn, violin (#4)
- Charles Neville (#5)
- Patrick Warren - chamberlin (#9)
- Steve Lindsey, organ (#6,10), synth (#8–9)
- Vicentico (#5)
