= Chim Chim's Badass Revenge =

Studio album by Fishbone
- Released: May 21, 1996
- Studio: D.A.R.P Studios (Atlanta, Georgia); Music Grinder Studios (Los Angeles, California); Irving Plaza (New York City, New York)
- Length: 68:32
- Label: Rowdy Records/Arista Records
- Producer: Dallas Austin and Fishbone

Fishbone chronology
Give a Monkey a Brain and He'll Swear He's the Center of the Universe (1993)	Chim Chim's Badass Revenge (1996)	Fishbone and the Familyhood Nextperience Present: The Psychotic Friends Nuttwerx (2000)

Singles from Chim Chim's Badass Revenge
- 1. "Alcoholic" Released: 1996

Professional ratings
Review scores
Source	Rating
AllMusic	2/5 stars
Entertainment Weekly	B−
Rolling Stone	3/5 stars

Chim Chim's Badass Revenge is the fifth full-length album and concept album from alternative rock band Fishbone. It was Fishbone's first studio album in three years following the departure of founding members Kendall Jones and Chris Dowd and the band being dropped by Sony Records. It was also their last album with founding member Philip "Fish" Fisher, who would leave the band two years later.

The band's recent experiences prompted the album's themes of racism and music industry practices, and Chim Chim's Badass Revenge includes some of the band's heaviest songs, such as the hardcore punk title track, "Riot" and "Psychologically Overcast" (the latter featuring guest vocals by Busta Rhymes). The album was produced by Dallas Austin, who said he wanted to take Fishbone to the next level as Rick Rubin had done with Red Hot Chili Peppers. In 1997, Austin would use Fishbone as the backing band for Amoeba Cleansing Syndrome, the second album by R&B singer Joi Gilliam.

John Bigham, who'd joined the band during the tour for The Reality of My Surroundings, makes his only solo guitar appearance on this album, leaving shortly after the completion due to what was cited as "lack of creative input" and wanting to create a solo career.

The song "Alcoholic" was written by Angelo Moore in his teenage years and was inspired by his uncle before the band was signed to Sony Records and appears on their original demo.

The album reached #158 on the Billboard Album Charts. It was the last Fishbone album for four years, as the band went through more personnel changes.

== Track listing ==
All songs written by Fishbone, except for "Chim Chim's Badass Revenge" and "Pre Nutt", which were written by Fishbone and executive producer Dallas Austin.

No.	Title	Length
1.	"Intro"	1:41
2.	"Chim Chim's Badass Revenge"	4:27
3.	"In The Cube"	8:32
4.	"Beergut"	3:39
5.	"Interlude 1"	1:57
6.	"Psychologically Overcast"	5:06
7.	"Alcoholic"	4:43
8.	"Love...Hate"	6:44
9.	"Interlude 2"	1:08
10.	"Riot"	0:56
11.	"Monkey Dick"	4:35
12.	"Sourpuss"	7:14
13.	"Rock Star"	5:09
14.	"Pre Nut"	3:11
15.	"Nutmeg"	10:30

== Personnel ==
Fishbone

- Angelo Moore - saxophone, theremin, vocals
- Walter A. Kibby II - trumpet, vocals
- John Bigham - guitar, keyboards
- John Norwood Fisher - bass guitar, vocals
- Philip "Fish" Fisher - drums

Additional

- Janna, Jeanette, John Nelson, Joi Gilliam, Mary Harris, Screechy Peach, N'Dea Davenport, Taree, Tirunji, Trina Mead - background vocals

Album Cover Art/Illustrations Ronald Stozo/R.Toons

== Charts ==
Album - Billboard (North America)

Year	Chart	Position
1996	The Billboard 200	158
