= Fishbone =

American rock band

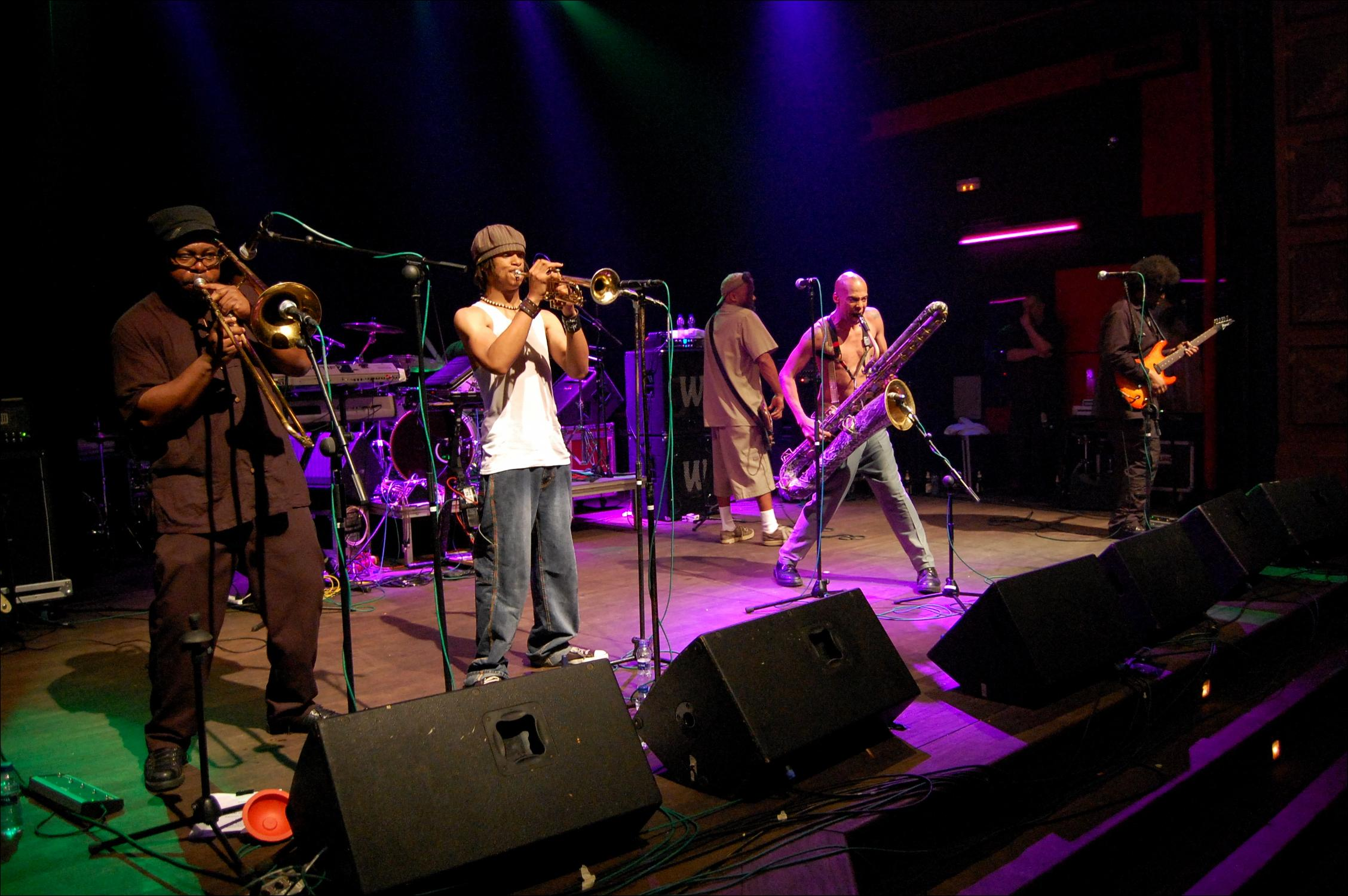
- Fishbone performing live in 2007

Background information
- Also known as: Fishbone & Familyhood Nextperience
- Origin: Los Angeles, California, U.S.
- Genres: Funk metal; alternative rock; funk rock; ska punk
- Years active: 1979–present
- Labels: Columbia; DC-Jam; Rowdy; Hollywood; High Times; Sound in Color; Nuttsactor 5
- Members: Angelo Moore; Christopher Dowd; Tracey "Spacey T" Singleton; Hassan Hurd; JS Williams; James Jones
- Past members: John Norwood Fisher; Walter A. Kibby II; Phillip "Fish" Fisher; Kendall Jones; Anthony Brewster; Dion Murdock; Tori Ruffin; André "PaDre" Holmes; Curtis Storey; John McKnight; Dre Gipson; Freddie Flint; Rocky George; Jay Armant; Paul Hampton; John Bigham; John Steward; Mark Phillips; Aroyn Day
- Website: www.fishbone.net

Fishbone is an American rock band from Los Angeles, California. Formed in 1979, the band plays a fusion of ska, punk, funk, metal, reggae, and soul. AllMusic has described the group as "one of the most distinctive and eclectic alternative rock bands of the late 1980s. With their hyperactive, self-conscious diversity, goofy sense of humor, and sharp social commentary, the group gained a sizable cult following".

Fishbone first assembled as school students in 1979 with John Norwood Fisher (bass), his brother Philip "Fish" Fisher (drums), Angelo Moore (vocals, saxophones, theremin), Kendall Jones (guitar), "Dirty" Walter A. Kibby II (vocals, trumpet), and Christopher Dowd (keyboards, trombone, vocals). They achieved their greatest commercial success in the late 1980s and early 1990s, after which they went through many personnel changes. Throughout the 2000s, John Norwood Fisher and Angelo Moore were the last remaining original members of the band. In the 2010s, the original lineup, save for Kendall Jones, reunited. As of 2025, the lineup consists of Moore, Dowd, guitarist Tracey "Spacey T" Singleton, drummer Hassan Hurd, trumpeter JS Williams, and bassist James Jones.

== History ==
=== Early career (1979–1987) ===
Fishbone got started in 1979 as a "disparate, all-black oddball crew" when the members were in junior high school. The Fisher brothers, Jones, Dowd, and Kibby were all from South Central Los Angeles and were included in a school busing program that sent them daily to the San Fernando Valley, where they met Moore, who was native to the area. After first using the name Megatron with Titus Norris on vocals, the sextet adopted the name Fishbone and formed a unique stew of different styles that became popular in the Los Angeles club scene and was a great influence on several subsequent alternative bands. Their first club date was at Madame Wong's, the influential venue in Los Angeles's Chinatown that had been a showcase for a variety of seminal punk bands in the 1980s. They formed strong friendships with Los Angeles bands like Red Hot Chili Peppers, Thelonious Monster, and Psi Com. Fishbone were signed to Columbia Records in 1983 after being spotted at a club gig by Brian O'Neal of The BusBoys. Their first release was the 1985 single "Party at Ground Zero", followed by a self-titled EP, Fishbone produced by David Kahne. They released their first full-length album In Your Face in 1986, and the following year they performed "Jamaica Ska" in the Annette Funicello/Frankie Avalon reunion movie Back to the Beach. Fishbone's first major international tour was as the opening act for Beastie Boys on the 1987 Licensed to Ill tour.

=== Rise to fame (1988–1994) ===
Fishbone was primarily considered a ska and funk band during their early years, but later became more guitar-driven with a focus on rock and soul music. The 1988 album Truth and Soul brought Fishbone wide critical acclaim. With this album, the band also added social commentary to their lyrics, covering topics such as the breakup of families, contemporary racism, fascism, nuclear war, and oppression in lower income housing projects. The album was highlighted by a hard rock-inspired version of Curtis Mayfield's classic "Freddie's Dead" from the film Super Fly. The music video, directed by Douglas Gayeton, became the band's first hit on MTV. That same year, the group toured with Red Hot Chili Peppers and became nationally known in the burgeoning alternative music scene. Also that year, Fishbone and Little Richard recorded the Lead Belly song "Rock Island Line" for the tribute album Folkways: A Vision Shared.

In 1989, the band added new member John Bigham on guitar and keyboards, shortly after Bigham's stint with jazz icon Miles Davis. The 1991 album The Reality of My Surroundings was a critical and commercial success, reaching No. 49 on the Billboard albums chart. One month before the album's release, the group played a performance on Saturday Night Live of "Sunless Saturday," a song which later featured an MTV video directed by Spike Lee. The song "Everyday Sunshine" also became a modest hit on radio and MTV.

While the band retained their roots in funk and ska, the 1993 album Give a Monkey a Brain and He'll Swear He's the Center of the Universe included songs with free jazz, hard rock, punk, and heavy metal elements. At the time of the album's release, the band began to tear apart internally. Just before Fishbone joined the 1993 Lollapalooza tour, guitarist Kendall Jones was accused of mental instability and quit the band, moving to Northern California. Bassist John Norwood Fisher tracked Jones down in the belief that he needed rescue from a religious cult, only to be charged with attempted kidnapping; Fisher was acquitted at trial. A benefit concert to help with Fisher's legal expenses featured Porno for Pyros, Primus, Tool, and Alice in Chains. Keyboardist Christopher Dowd left Fishbone in 1994 and released an album titled Puzzle in 1997 under the name The Seedy Arkhestra, with various guests including Jeff Buckley and N'Dea Davenport. The album included an anti-Fishbone song called "Flog Your Dead Horse."

=== Post-Sony years (1995–2002) ===
Now a five-piece, Fishbone was dropped by Sony Records (formerly Columbia) in 1995, upon presenting their next album. The band added more heavy metal and hardcore punk influences to their sound on the 1996 concept album Chim Chim's Badass Revenge, released by Rowdy Records and produced by Dallas Austin. The album went largely unnoticed by the general public, peaking at just No. 158 on the Billboard albums chart. In 1996, the band contributed to the AIDS benefit album Silencio=Muerte: Red Hot + Latin produced by the Red Hot Organization. In 1998 the band lost another founding member, drummer Philip "Fish" Fisher, who became a session drummer and later appeared in the heavy metal band Wicked Wisdom. After brief periods with various drummers, the position was filled definitively by John Steward. John Bigham also left the band during this period to pursue his own career, later founding the band The Soul of John Black; Bigham was replaced by former Sound Barrier and Mother's Finest guitarist Tracey "Spacey T" Singleton. Keyboardist and horn player Anthony Brewster (The Untouchables) was a member of the group from 1997 to 1998, while John McKnight (from Ben Harper's band) joined on keyboards, trombone, and guitar. During the latter part of the 1990s, Fishbone was without a recording contract and earned their keep through constant touring.

Fishbone maintained their dedicated fan base and achieved another major record deal with Hollywood Records in 2000. They were given the chance to record a new album with several special guests, including H.R. of Bad Brains, Gwen Stefani, George Clinton, Rick James, Donny Osmond, and Los Fabulosos Cadillacs. The resulting album, Fishbone and the Familyhood Nextperience Present: The Psychotic Friends Nuttwerx, saw poor sales, though AllMusic called it the band's best album in a decade. The band was dropped from Hollywood Records and headed back on the road. John McKnight left the band in 2001, and the group continued as a five-piece. In 2002, on their own independent record label, they released Live at the Temple Bar and More which contained all new songs recorded live throughout 2001 and 2002. This was later complemented by a live CD/DVD, Live in Amsterdam, containing most of their hits and filmed at the 2002 Cannabis Cup Festival in Amsterdam, Netherlands.

=== Shifting membership and a documentary (2003–2015) ===
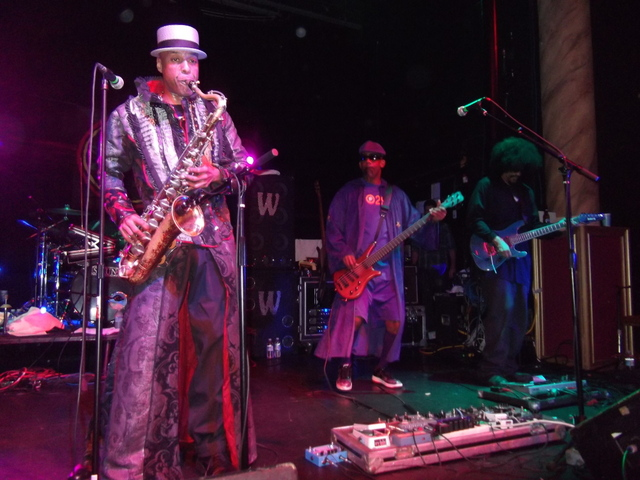
Moore, Fisher and Rocky George performing in 2010

In late 2003 Fishbone lost another founding member when Walter Kibby left the band. Guitarist Tracy Singleton departed as well. After leaving Fishbone, Kibby released two albums with his band Dirty Walt & The Columbus Sanitation: To Put It Bluntly (2000) and Still Smokin' (2009). Kibby and Singleton also collaborated in the band Year of the Dragon, releasing the albums A Time to Love Is a Time to Bleed (2006) and Blunt Force Karma (2009). Together, they also recorded tracks with Swade G (Kibby's younger brother Wade Antonio Kibby) for the album Ghetto Life (2010).

After the 2003 departure of Kibby and Singleton, the last two founding members John Norwood Fisher and Angelo Moore, along with drummer John Steward, restarted Fishbone with Rocky George of Suicidal Tendencies and Tori Ruffin of The Time on guitars (though Ruffin left soon thereafter), and Dre Gipson on keyboards. In 2005 John McKnight returned on trombone and guitar. Trumpet players during this period were PaDre Holmes, Fernando Pullum, Mervin Campbell, and Curtis Storey. The line-up of Fisher, Moore, Steward, George, Gipson, Storey, and McKnight recorded the studio album Still Stuck in Your Throat with producer David Kahne, who had worked on the band's early albums. The album was released in October 2006 in Europe, and in April 2007 in the United States. Music videos were recorded for the cover song "Date Rape" by Sublime, and for the song "Let Dem Ho's Fight."

In 2008 and 2009, departed original members Walter Kibby, Christopher Dowd, and Kendall Jones joined Fishbone on stage on various occasions, most notably for the shoot of the Pepsi "Pass" commercial, which aired in January 2009. In April 2008, Stephan Kraemer directed the shoot of a live CD/DVD recorded in Bordeaux, France. The DVD Fishbone Live was released on May 10, 2009.

In January 2010, John McKnight left Fishbone for the second time. During this period original member Walter Kibby returned on trumpet and vocals. During a 2011 tour, Tom "Tom-Bone" Ralls, formerly of Weapon of Choice, filled in on trombone. Tori Ruffin also briefly returned to play guitar in place of Rocky George, who was unable to tour. After the tour, Jay Armant, a former student of Fernando Pullum, joined as the new trombone player. Fishbone released a seven-track EP titled Crazy Glue on October 11, 2011.

Current and former members of the band were deeply involved in the making of the documentary film Everyday Sunshine: The Story of Fishbone, directed by Lev Anderson and Chris Metzler. Narrated by Laurence Fishburne and featuring interviews with Les Claypool, Gwen Stefani, Flea, Branford Marsalis, George Clinton, Ice-T, and Gogol Bordello, the film debuted at the Los Angeles Film Festival on June 19, 2010. The film has screened at more than 100 film festivals in twenty countries, winning 12 awards for Best Documentary. One of the top-reviewed documentaries of 2011–2012, the film has a ranking of 100% on RottenTomatoes.com and was nominated for a Golden Tomato Award. The film was rolled out in United States theaters nationwide with bookings in over seventy-five cities, including extended runs in New York, Los Angeles and San Francisco, plus week-long engagements in 20+ cities including Chicago, Boston, Seattle, Portland, Detroit, New Orleans, Baltimore, and Kansas City. A DVD was released by The Cinema Guild on February 21, 2012, and received a national TV broadcast on the public television series AfroPoP.

In February 2013, keyboardist Dre Gipson left the band after nine years to focus on a new project called Hunter Green. Fishbone was in the midst of a US tour, and reggae musician Freddie Flint filled in temporarily on keyboards. In July 2013, Paul Hampton (formerly of The Skeletones) joined as Fishbone's new keyboardist. In February 2014, federal judge Jan E. DuBois ruled that Fishbone had to pay $1.4 million to a woman who suffered a fractured skull and collarbone during a 2010 concert in Philadelphia when Angelo Moore stage-dove and landed on top of her. A five-track EP titled Intrinsically Intertwined was released on April 22, 2014.

=== Original lineup reforms and disbands again (2016–present) ===
On November 18, 2016, founding member and original drummer Philip "Fish" Fisher played his first show with the band since his departure in 1998. On November 26, Fishbone performed at a Jimi Hendrix tribute concert at Harlem's Apollo Theater, at which time drummer John Steward departed Fishbone after 18 years to make room for the returning Fish. In January 2017 the band announced a tour to commemorate the 1996 album Chim Chim's Badass Revenge. Former guitarist John Bigham returned to the band, after which Rocky George departed after 14 years of service.

In late 2017 Moore, Kibby, and John Norwood Fisher were featured on the song "Creatures of Habit" by John Heintz's funk-rock supergroup The Big Ol' Nasty Getdown. Their song "Creatures of Habit" was chosen for the New York Times top ten playlist on January 5, 2018. Fisher played bass for The Big Ol' Nasty Getdown song "Mantra" while he and Moore have made several appearances on subsequent albums by the supergroup.

In January 2018, Christopher Dowd made a guest appearance with the band onstage and decided to rejoin, thus replacing both trombonist Jay Armant and keyboardist Paul Hampton. The band's 2018 lineup consisted of Angelo Moore, John Norwood Fisher, Fish, Walter Kibby, Christopher Dowd, and John Bigham, thus recreating the classic Fishbone lineup minus Kendall Jones. In December 2019, John Bigham announced that he was no longer playing with Fishbone to focus on his solo work. Guitarist Mark Phillips joined the band shortly thereafter. In November 2020, Kendall Jones made a rare appearance with the band for a performance of "Them Bones" by Alice in Chains for a tribute to the band arranged by the Museum of Pop Culture. Phillip "Fish" Fisher left the group again in late 2021, after which John Steward rejoined on drums.

On May 26, 2023, Fishbone released a self-titled EP, including one song in collaboration with NOFX. In January 2024, Steward left the band for the second time. On April 25, 2024, Fishbone made a vague post on Facebook indicating a major lineup change for their upcoming live dates. The following day, Dowd revealed that Fisher and Kibby had left the band due to disagreements over songwriting and recording schedules. Dowd and Moore vowed to continue, alongside new musicians to be announced, as Fishbone. This left Moore as the only member who has been with Fishbone throughout its entire history; Dowd was also a founding member but with a lengthy hiatus before rejoining. New members Aroyn Day, Hassan Hurd, and JS Williams were added. Guitarist Mark Phillips left the band four months later, and was replaced by Tracey "Spacey T" Singleton who had previously left the band in 2003.

In October 2024, the new lineup released the single "Racist Piece of Shit", denouncing Donald Trump. On April 25, 2025, the group released the single "Last Call in America" which features George Clinton. Both this song and "Racist Piece of Shit" are featured on the band's studio album Stockholm Syndrome which was released on June 27, 2025 and is the band's first new studio album since 2006's Still Stuck in Your Throat. "Suckered by Sabotage" was released as the third single from the album.

== Members ==
- Angelo Moore – vocals, saxophones, theremin, percussion (1979-present)
- Christopher Dowd – keyboards, trombone, vocals (1979–1994, 2018–present)
- Tracey "Spacey T" Singleton - guitar (1997–2003, 2024–present)
- Hassan Hurd – drums (2024–present)
- JS Williams – trumpet, vocals, keyboards (2024–present)
- James Jones - bass (2025–present)

== Discography ==
=== Studio albums ===
List of studio albums, with selected chart positions and sales figures
| Title | Album details | Peak chart positions | | Sales |
| Title | Album details | US | CAN | Sales |
|---|---|---|---|---|
| In Your Face | Released: November 1986; Label: Columbia; Format: CD, CS, LP | — | — | |
| Truth and Soul | Released: September 13, 1988; Label: Columbia; Format: CD, CS, LP | 153 | — | |
| The Reality of My Surroundings | Released: April 23, 1991; Label: Columbia; Format: CD, CS, 2xLP | 49 | 68 | US: 200,000 |
| Give a Monkey a Brain and He'll Swear He's the Center of the Universe | Released: May 23, 1993; Label: Columbia; Format: CD, CS, LP + 7", MD | 99 | 61 | US: 128,000 |
| Chim Chim's Badass Revenge | Released: May 21, 1996; Label: Rowdy/Arista; Format: CD, CS | 158 | — | US: 36,000 |
| Fishbone and the Familyhood Nextperience Present: The Psychotic Friends Nuttwerx | Released: March 21, 2000; Label: Hollywood; Format: CD | — | — | |
| Still Stuck in Your Throat | Released: October 16, 2006; Label: Sound In Color; Format: CD | — | | |
| Stockholm Syndrome | Released: June 27, 2025; Label: Format: CD, vinyl, digital download, streaming | — | | |
"—" denotes a recording that did not chart or was not released in that territory.

=== Live albums ===
- Live at the Temple Bar and More (2002)
- Live in Amsterdam (CD/DVD – 2005 – recorded live in November 2002)
- Fishbone Live (in Bordeaux) (CD/DVD – 2009 – recorded live in April 2008)
- Live at The Independent (2012)

=== Compilation albums ===
- Singles (Japan only, 1993)
- Fishbone 101: Nuttasaurusmeg Fossil Fuelin' the Fonkay (1996)
- The Essential Fishbone (2003)

=== EPs ===
- Fishbone (1985)
- It's a Wonderful Life (1987)
- Set the Booty Up Right (1990)
- Fishbone and the Familyhood Nextperience Present: The Friendliest Psychosis of All (2002)
- Crazy Glue (2011)
- Intrinsically Intertwined (2014)
- Fishbone (2023)

=== Singles ===
List of singles, with selected chart positions, showing year released and album name
| Title | Year | Peak chart positions | | Album |
| Title | Year | US Modern | UK | Album |
|---|---|---|---|---|
| "? (Modern Industry)" | 1985 | — | — | Fishbone EP |
| "Party at Ground Zero" | 1985 | — | — | Fishbone EP |
| "When Problems Arise" | 1986 | — | — | In Your Face |
| "Freddie's Dead" | 1988 | — | — | Truth and Soul |
| "Change" | 1988 | — | — | Truth and Soul |
| "Question of Life" | 1988 | — | — | Truth and Soul |
| "Ma and Pa" | 1989 | — | 95 | Truth and Soul |
| "Bonin' in the Boneyard" | 1990 | — | — | Truth and Soul |
| "Fight the Youth" | 1991 | — | — | The Reality of My Surroundings |
| "Sunless Saturday" | 1991 | 7 | — | The Reality of My Surroundings |
| "Everyday Sunshine" | 1991 | 14 | 60 | The Reality of My Surroundings |
| "Lemon Meringue" | 1993 | — | — | Give a Monkey a Brain and He'll Swear He's the Center of the Universe |
| "Black Flowers" | 1993 | — | — | Give a Monkey a Brain and He'll Swear He's the Center of the Universe |
| "No Fear" | 1993 | — | — | Give a Monkey a Brain and He'll Swear He's the Center of the Universe |
| "Swim" | 1993 | — | 54 | Give a Monkey a Brain and He'll Swear He's the Center of the Universe |
| "Unyielding Conditioning" | 1993 | — | — | Give a Monkey a Brain and He'll Swear He's the Center of the Universe |
| "Servitude" | 1993 | — | — | Give a Monkey a Brain and He'll Swear He's the Center of the Universe |
| "Alcoholic" | 1996 | — | — | Chim Chim's Badass Revenge |
| "Crazy Bald Heads" | 1997 | — | — | Chim Chim's Badass Revenge |
| "The Suffering" | 2000 | — | — | The Psychotic Friends Nuttwerx |
| "Party with Saddam" | 2007 | — | — | Still Stuck In Your Throat |
| "Estranged Fruit" | 2023 | — | — | Fishbone EP (2023) |
| "Racist Piece of Shit" | 2024 | — | — | Stockholm Syndrome |
| "Last Call in America" (featuring George Clinton) | 2025 | — | — | Stockholm Syndrome |
| "Suckered by Sabotage" | 2025 | — | — | Stockholm Syndrome |
"—" denotes a recording that did not chart or was not released in that territory.

=== Music videos ===
- Modern Industry (1985)
- Party At Ground Zero (1985)
- V.T.T.L.O.T.F.D.G.F. (1985)
- When Problems Arise (1986)
- It's a Wonderful Life (1987)
- Jamaican Ska (1987)
- Freddie's Dead (1988)
- Ma and Pa (1988)
- Fight the Youth (1991)
- Sunless Saturday (1991)
- Everyday Sunshine (1991)
- Swim (1993)
- Servitude (1993)
- Unyielding Conditioning (1993)
- Alcoholic (1996)
- Date Rape (2006)
- Let Dem Ho's Fight (2007)
- Crazy Glue (2011)
- All We Have Is Now (2023)
- Racist Piece of Shit (2024)
- Last Call in America (featuring George Clinton) (2025)
- Suckered by Sabotage (2025)

=== DVDs ===
- The Reality of My Surroundings: Past to Present (1991)
- Critical Times: Fishbone's Hen House Sessions (2001)
- Live in Amsterdam (CD/DVD – 2005 – recorded live in 2002)
- Fishbone Live (in Bordeaux) (CD/DVD – 2009 – recorded live in April 2008)
- Everyday Sunshine: The Story of Fishbone (Documentary – 2012)

=== Appearances on soundtracks and "various artists" compilations ===
- "Jamaica Ska", with Annette Funicello, on Back to the Beach soundtrack (1987) (Fishbone appear in the film)
- "He's a Fly Guy", with Curtis Mayfield, on I'm Gonna Git You Sucka soundtrack (1988) (Fishbone appear in the film: they are outside the prison when Flyguy gets out)
- "Slow Bus Moving" on Tapeheads soundtrack (1988) (Fishbone appear in this film: they are in a bar playing this song)
- "Rock Island Line", with Little Richard, on Folkways: A Vision Shared compilation (1988)
- "Skankin' to the Beat" on Say Anything... soundtrack (1989)
- Live version of "Freddie's Dead" on Genrecide: A Compilation, Vol. 1 (1993)
- "Swim" on Last Action Hero soundtrack (1993)
- "Let the Good Times Roll" on The Mask soundtrack (1994)
- "Fled" on Fled soundtrack (1996)
- "What's New Pussycat?" with Los Fabulosos Cadillacs on Silencio=Muerte: Red Hot + Latin compilation (1996)
- "Crazy Bald Heads" on Ska Island compilation (1997)
- "I'm a Weed Plant", later reworked into "Where'd You Get Those Pants", on Steady Sounds from the Underground compilation (1998)
- "Critical Time" on Hen House Studios Anthology Volume II, 2002
- "Cheyenne Star Forever Moore" on Rising Son: The Legend of Skateboarder Christian Hosoi: Music Inspired by the Film compilation (2006)
- "Dead Ones (Scene 3) – Revenge" and "Night Out (Scene 5) – Connects" (as Mega*Nut) on Lifesavas' Gutterfly soundtrack (2007)
- "Changes" (not to be confused with "Change" from Truth and Soul) on The ChangeRing Compilation (2008)
- "Our House", on New Wave '80s Hits and Generation Rubik's Cube compilations (2009)

=== Guest appearances ===
- "Fix" (Blackstreet featuring Ol' Dirty Bastard, Slash and Fishbone) (1997)
- Amoeba Cleansing Syndrome (Joi) (1997)
- Boggy Depot (Jerry Cantrell) (1998) Tracks 2 and 12 feature Angelo Moore on horns. Tracks 4 and 5 feature John Norwood Fisher on bass.
- The Crucial Conspiracy (The Dingees) (2001) Multiple tracks feature Angelo Moore on vocals, horns, and theremin.
- Purple Onion (The Les Claypool Frog Brigade) (2002) Tracks 5 and 8 feature Phillip "Fish" Fisher on drums. Track 8 features John Norwood Fisher on bass.
- Sunny Disposition (Avenged Sevenfold) (2016)

== Film and television appearances ==
- Angelo Moore appeared briefly in the 1984 movie Breakin' 2: Electric Boogaloo.
- In 1985, Angelo Moore and Walter Kibby appeared in the Eurythmics video "Would I Lie to You?"
- Angelo Moore appeared in the 1986 music video for "Do Fries Go with That Shake?" by George Clinton.
- The band is featured in the 1987 movie Back to the Beach, performing a rendition of "Jamaica Ska" with Annette Funicello singing lead vocals.
- In 1987, the band has a brief cameo in the Hank Williams Jr. music video "Young Country", appearing on a merry-go-round, raising their cowboy hats as they pass by the camera.
- Fishbone appears in the 1988 John Cusack/Tim Robbins film Tapeheads as "Ranchbone" in the bar scene, playing the song "Slow Bus Movin' (Howard Beach Party)". They supplied an incidental score for the film as well.
- In the 1988 blaxploitation-spoof I'm Gonna Git You Sucka, members of Fishbone appear on the street as hecklers of Antonio Fargas' character Flyguy, and also as a back-up band.
- The January 1989 performance at Brixton Academy, London, UK was shown on UK TV in February 1989 in the second episode of Channel 4's Big World Cafe introducing the group to a wider UK audience.
- Frontman Angelo Moore made a cameo in the 1989 music video for the Red Hot Chili Peppers song, "Knock Me Down"
- Angelo Moore joins Living Colour live on stage for their performance of "Elvis Is Dead" on a 1990 episode of The Arsenio Hall Show. This performance of the song also features a live guest appearance of Little Richard on vocals.
- Angelo Moore has several appearances in the music video for the Sublime song, "Wrong Way".
- The song "Swim" was featured in the 1993 film Last Action Hero.
- Angelo Moore and John Norwood Fisher both appear in the music video for The Mighty Mighty Bosstones' 1993 cover of the Bob Marley song "Simmer Down".
- A woman wears a Fishbone t-shirt in the 1991 Richard Linklater film Slacker.
- In 1994 Fishbone plays "Let the Good Times Roll" in the Chuck Russell film The Mask. Fishbone is also on the film's soundtrack.
- Fishbone performed "Sunless Saturday" on Saturday Night Live on March 23, 1991.
- The band appeared on the March 6, 1995, edition of WWF's Monday Night Raw to promote their upcoming performance of "America the Beautiful" at WrestleMania XI. The band was ultimately replaced by Special Olympian Kathy Huey.
- Fishbone is mentioned by Janeane Garofalo as the musical guest on February 12, 1997, episode of The Larry Sanders Show entitled "Pain Equals Funny".
- Angelo Moore, John Norwood Fisher, and John Steward appear in the 2006 film Idlewild as members of the band led by Rooster, the character played by Big Boi of OutKast.
- In 2007 Fishbone appeared in the David Arquette movie The Tripper.
- Marlon Wayans (in the role of Seymour Stewart) wears a Fishbone T-shirt in Mo' Money (1992).
- The characters Freddie and Lena of A Different World were depicted as fans and could be seen wearing Fishbone band shirts.
- John Cusack wears a Fishbone shirt in the film Say Anything.... The movie's iconic "boombox" scene originally featured Fishbone's "Turn the Other Way" blaring from the radio. Peter Gabriel's "In Your Eyes" replaced the song during editing.
- In the movie Bull Durham, Tim Robbins' character Ebby "Nuke" Laloosh is wearing a Fishbone T-shirt with his suit while giving his first interview after getting called up to the big leagues.
- In 2010's Hot Tub Time Machine, Cusack pulls out and clearly advertises a black T-shirt with the band's logo from his character's suitcase.
- In the TV show Northern Exposure, Ed Chigliak (Darren E. Burrows) is frequently spotted with a Fishbone shirt under his leather jacket.
- Early episodes of Beverly Hills, 90210 had scenes filmed against a set of lockers that featured a Fishbone sticker in almost every shot.
- On November 21, 2011, Republican presidential candidate Michele Bachmann was played on to Late Night with Jimmy Fallon to the Fishbone song "Lyin' Ass Bitch". The Roots drummer Questlove later explained that the playing of the song was "tongue in cheek." Fallon and the NBC network later apologized.
- In the video for the Ramones song "I Believe in Miracles" the band's name appears as part of the scrolling text on the upper and lower part of the screen. Fishbone members are also seen in a cameo in this music video.
