= Fishbone (EP) =

EP by Fishbone
- Released: September 21, 1985
- Recorded: 1985
- Studios: Sunset Sound Factory, Hollywood, CA; Eldorado Recording Studios, Burbank, CA
- Genres: Ska; Rock
- Length: 26:33
- Label: Columbia
- Producer: David Kahne

Fishbone chronology
Fishbone (1985)	In Your Face (1986)

Singles from Fishbone
- 1. "? (Modern Industry)" Released: 1985; 2. "Party at Ground Zero" Released: 1985

Professional ratings
Review scores
Source	Rating
AllMusic	3/5 stars
Robert Christgau	B+
Rolling Stone	3/5 stars

Fishbone is the recording debut of alternative group Fishbone. This six-song EP was released in 1985 and captures the band at the height of their early funk/ska era. The track "Party at Ground Zero" remains one of the band's most popular tracks.

The track "V.T.T.L.O.T.F.D.G.F." stands for "Voyage to the Land of the Freeze-Dried Godzilla Farts", as confirmed on the band's website, and imagines a government attempt to convince the public that Hiroshima was actually caused by Godzilla farting.

== Reception ==
Spin wrote, "The spirits of Little Richard, Chuck Berry and dozens of anonymous honkers and shouters haunt the grooves. Fishbone charges through the six cuts at breakneck speed. Tunes jump jaggedly from one change to another, flashing a frantic ska-beat, squawking horns, growling guitars, nearly a capella harmonies, yelps, squeaks, guffaws and moans."

== Track listing ==
No.	Title	Writer(s)	Length
1.	"Ugly"	Kendall Jones	2:52
2.	"Another Generation"	Jones	4:04
3.	"? (Modern Industry)"	David Kahne, Jones	4:26
4.	"Party at Ground Zero"	Jones, Angelo Moore, John Norwood Fisher	6:31
5.	"V.T.T.L.O.T.F.D.G.F."	Fisher	4:23
6.	"Lyin' Ass Bitch"	Lisa R. Grant, Jones, Moore	4:16

7. "Skankin' to the Beat" (bonus track, some vinyl editions)

== Personnel ==
Fishbone

- Angelo Moore – saxophone, vocals
- Walter A. Kibby II – trumpet, vocals
- Kendall Jones – guitars, vocals
- Chris Dowd – keyboards, trombone, vocals
- John Norwood Fisher – bass, vocals
- Philip "Fish" Fisher – drums

Additional personnel

- Lisa Grant – vocals on "Lyin' Ass Bitch"

Production

- Nancy Donald – design
- David Kahne – engineer
- Tony Lane – design
- David Leonard – engineer, mixing
- John Scarpati – photography
- Jack Skinner – mastering (Sterling Sound, New York City)

== Accolades ==
Year	Publication	Country	Accolade	Rank
1985	The Village Voice	United States	Albums of the Year (EP)	3
