= Give a Monkey a Brain and He'll Swear He's the Center of the Universe =

Studio album by Fishbone
- Released: May 23, 1993
- Recorded: One on One (Los Angeles)
- Genres: Funk metal; punk rock; ska
- Length: 64:44
- Label: Columbia
- Producers: Terry Date, Fishbone

Fishbone chronology
The Reality of My Surroundings (1991)	Give a Monkey a Brain and He'll Swear He's the Center of the Universe (1993)	Chim Chim's Badass Revenge (1996)

Singles from Give a Monkey a Brain...
- 1. "Swim"; 2. "Unyielding Conditioning" Released: 1993; 3. "Servitude" Released: 1993; 4. "Black Flowers" Released: 1993; 5. "No Fear" Released: 1993

Professional ratings
Review scores
Source	Rating
AllMusic	2/5 stars
Robert Christgau	(dud)
Entertainment Weekly	B+
Rolling Stone	2/5 stars

Give a Monkey a Brain and He'll Swear He's the Center of the Universe is the fourth studio album by American rock band Fishbone. It was the last album to feature all six original members, as guitarist Kendall Jones left the band a few months after the album's release, and keyboardist/trombonist Chris Dowd would leave the next year.

It is Fishbone's heaviest album, with the band focusing on heavy metal without any trace of their trademark horn section until the fourth song, the ska-infused "Unyielding Conditioning". Saxophonist Branford Marsalis makes an appearance on the manic "Drunk Skitzo", and the ending of "Swim" includes excerpts of a Damon Wayans stand-up routine about his experience at a Fishbone concert.

Shortly after the release of the album, the band toured as part of the third annual Lollapalooza festival, before being dropped by Sony Records the following year.

The title is a quotation from the Discordian religious text Principia Discordia.

== Content ==
In a 1993 interview with Billboard, Angelo Moore described the album:

It is an angry record. Angry at the evil out there - in law enforcement, in the government, in all the people that run the world. That's what the title of the album applies to. These people have gotten so hooked on the power, they're like monkeys - monkeys on our backs. We're pissed - we're saying 'no more niggers.'

== Track listing ==
No.	Title	Writer(s)	Length
1.	"Swim"	John Bigham	4:42
2.	"Servitude"	Kendall Jones	5:20
3.	"Black Flowers"	Chris Dowd	5:46
4.	"Unyielding Conditioning"	Kendall Jones	4:45
5.	"Properties of Propaganda (Fuk This Shit On Up)"	John Norwood Fisher	5:22
6.	"The Warmth of Your Breath"	John Norwood Fisher, Angelo Moore	4:55
7.	"Lemon Meringue"	John Norwood Fisher	6:10
8.	"They All Have Abandoned Their Hopes"	John Norwood Fisher, Angelo Moore, Chris Dowd	4:58
9.	"End the Reign"	Kendall Jones	5:23
10.	"Drunk Skitzo"	Angelo Moore, John Norwood Fisher	5:17
11.	"No Fear"	John Bigham	6:01
12.	"Nutt Megalomaniac"	John Norwood Fisher	5:43

== Personnel ==
Fishbone

- Angelo Moore – saxophone, vocals
- Walter A. Kibby II – trumpet, vocals
- Kendall Jones – lead guitar, vocals
- Chris Dowd – keyboards, trombone, vocals
- John Bigham – guitar, keyboards
- John Norwood Fisher – bass, vocals
- Philip "Fish" Fisher – drums

Additional personnel

- Kristen Vigard – background vocals
- Branford Marsalis – saxophone on "Drunk Skitzo"

== Accolades ==
Year	Publication	Country	Accolade	Rank
1996	Visions	Germany	"The Best Albums 1991–96"	*
"*" denotes an unordered list.

== Charts ==
Album - Billboard (North America)

Year	Chart	Position
1993	Billboard 200	99
