= In Your Face (Fishbone album) =

Studio album by Fishbone
- Released: November 1986
- Recorded: 1986
- Studio: Sunset Sound Factory (Hollywood); Ocean Way Recording (Los Angeles)
- Genre: Ska; funk; punk rock; new wave
- Length: 33:50
- Label: Columbia
- Producer: David Kahne

Fishbone chronology
Fishbone EP (1985)	In Your Face (1986)	It's a Wonderful Life (1987)

Singles from In Your Face
- 1. "When Problems Arise" Released: 1986

In Your Face is the debut studio album by American rock band Fishbone, released in November 1986. It is the band's second major label release for Columbia Records following their self-titled EP from the previous year.

As would be characteristic of the band's music for their entire career, In Your Face contains a mix of ska, reggae, soul, punk and funk, but displayed very little influence in hard rock and heavy metal as the band would adopt in future records.

== Packaging ==
The cover art of the original vinyl LP was designed to give the illusion that no certain side of the record was the front, back, up or down of the record. This was achieved by placing a barcode on both sides of the record and by printing the band and record name on all four sides of every edge of the record sleeve. Instead of an ordered track listing the tracks were listed haphazardly between both sides with each song title printed in a different contradictory direction. Finally, each side showed three of the six band members also oriented at opposite angles from each other. When someone handling the record saw where the record jacket opened they may have realized the two most likely correct orientations for the album cover. However the illusion was impaired by the inclusion of a parental advisory sticker on only one side of the record and the artwork of the CD version of the album which used the side with singer Angelo Moore on the cover and placed the entire track list on the opposite side.

== Promotion ==
The band toured in support of the album with Murphy's Law and headliners Beastie Boys on the Licensed to Ill tour in February and March 1987. A music video for the album's only single, "When Problems Arise," was directed by Gary Weis and Tony Basil and features the band performing with a group of hula dancers. CBS and Columbia Records placed a full-page ad for the album on page five of the October 25, 1986 issue of Billboard.

== Reception ==
Professional ratings
Review scores
Source	Rating
AllMusic	3/5 stars
Robert Christgau	B−
Rolling Stone	3/5 stars

Fishbone's previous EP had done better than expected and expectations at Columbia Records were raised for In Your Face which led to radio support by CBS. However, Fishbone still had a considerable challenge reaching a larger audience within the American music industry which was still racially segregated during the 1980s and was not prepared to market to both black and white audiences. As a result, the album did not have sales significantly stronger than the Fishbone EP.

Reviews at the time were generally mixed-to-positive. Nelson George, writing for Billboard, reviewed the album favorably, calling it "groove-conscious" and containing "lyrical and melodic depth." He further commented that the band had potential to be a major act in the world of black music and the music industry as a whole. For The Miami Herald, Tom Moon was also positive saying the album was perfect for a party, praising the mix of punk, ska and New Orleans influences and commenting that "Fishbone's time has come." In a review for The New York Times, Jon Pareles called it a "Rock Album of the Week," but was mixed in his response, praising the more mature sound and handful of politically conscious tracks but criticizing the uneven blend of absurd humor and serious themes.

Retrospective reviews were more mixed to average. Greg Prato for AllMusic said the album was an incomplete exploration of their sound although it was still an important moment in the career toward achieving the greater successes of later albums. Robert Christgau gave the album a B− and said "...they look like 2-Tone fashion plates and sound like big-time new-wave satirists, which suggests their stock in trade is haircuts". The album also received three-out-of-five stars from The New Rolling Stone Album Guide, published in 2004.

== Track listing ==
No.	Title	Writer(s)	Length
1.	"When Problems Arise"	Kendall Jones, John Norwood Fisher, David Kahne	3:56
2.	"A Selection"	Angelo Moore, Jones, Kahne	3:03
3.	"Cholly"	Moore, Jones	2:50
4.	"I Wish I Had a Date"	Moore, Walter A. Kibby II	2:03
5.	"A Movement in the Light"	Jones	3:44
6.	"Give It Up"	Jones, Moore, Kahne	3:14
7.	"In the Air"	Jones, Moore, Fisher, Kahne	3:36
8.	"Turn the Other Way"	Jones, Moore	5:08
9.	"Knock It"	Kibby, Fisher, Kahne	3:49
10.	"'Simon Says' the Kingpin"	Moore	1:25
11.	"Post Cold War Politics"	Moore	1:01

== Personnel ==
=== Fishbone ===
- Angelo Moore – saxophone, vocals
- Walter A. Kibby II – trumpet, vocals
- Kendall Jones – guitar
- Chris Dowd – keyboards, trombone, vocals
- John Norwood Fisher – bass
- Philip 'Fish' Fisher – drums

=== Additional personnel ===
- Rick Culver – trombone on "Turn the Other Way"
- Lisa Grant – vocals on "Knock It"
- David Kahne – additional guitars, additional keyboards
- Kurt McGettrick – baritone saxophone on "Turn the Other Way"

=== Production ===
- David Leonard – mixing
- Mike Ross – mixing
- Hayley Rosen – mixing
- John Scarpati – photography
- Wally Traugott – mastering, remastering (Capitol Records)

==== Engineers ====
- Tchad Blake
- Bill Jackson
- David Kahne
- Mike Kloster
- Doug Schwartz
