= Angelo Moore =

American musician

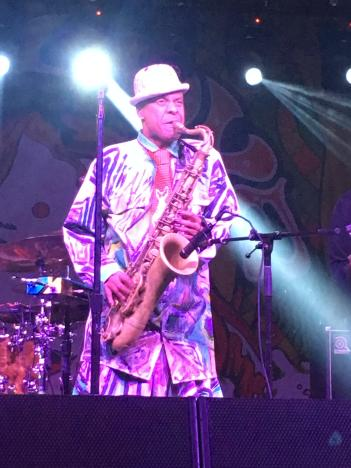
- Moore performing with Fishbone in 2019

Background information
- Also known as: Dr. MadVibe
- Born: Angelo Christopher Moore; November 5, 1965 (age 60); Los Angeles, California, United States
- Genres: Alternative rock; funk metal; ska punk; spoken word; reggae rock; ska; jazz
- Occupations: Singer; musician; poet; author; actor
- Instruments: Vocals; saxophone; theremin; percussion; jaw harp; didgeridoo; keyboards
- Years active: 1979–present
- Labels: Columbia; Rowdy; Hollywood; Sony; High Times; Sound In Color; Nuttsactor 5; Mooremapp; vAu de vire Society Circus
- Member of: Fishbone
- Website: Official Fishbone.net Dr. MadVibe Angelo Moore and The Brand New Step Angelo Moore art

Angelo Christopher Moore (born November 5, 1965) is an American musician, best known for his work as lead singer and saxophonist for the Los Angeles ska and funk metal band Fishbone. Moore is a multi-instrumentalist playing bass, baritone, tenor, alto and soprano saxophones, as well as, the theremin, piano, double-tier organ, cuica, congas, jaw harp, and drums. Moore also performs and records under the stage name Dr. MadVibe (sometimes spelled Madd Vibe or MaddVibe). He has recorded with the Red Hot Chili Peppers, Jane's Addiction, Murphy's Law, Gwen Stefani, Everlast, Goldfinger, and Bad Brains and has played over 3300 shows in his career. He currently resides in Woodland Hills, CA.

== Biography ==
Moore grew up in Southern California's San Fernando Valley and attended Platt Ranch Elementary School, followed by Hale Junior High School in Woodland Hills, where he met the classmates with whom he would form Fishbone. Moore's father William George Moore was an English teacher and speech pathologist and played saxophone for Count Basie, and his mother Dazireen Daretta Johnson was an English teacher for the Los Angeles unified school district. From an early age, his parents exposed him to jazz, soul, blues and funk music. He then attended El Camino Real High School in Woodland Hills. He later attended Pierce College, before dropping out to focus on Fishbone.

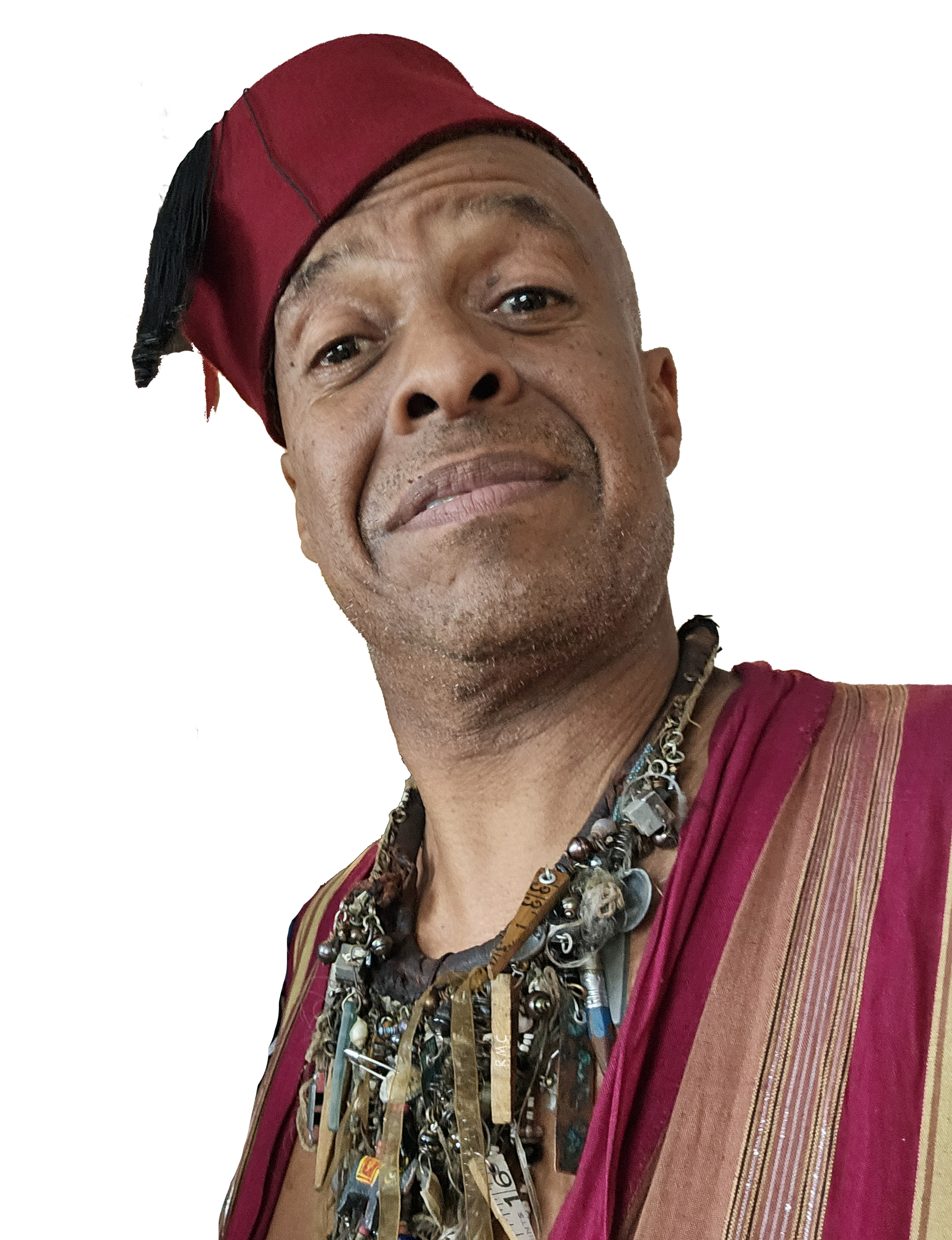
Angelo Moore, New York City - July 4, 2024

In addition to his regular duties with Fishbone, in 1993 Moore released a poetry anthology titled Dr. Madd Vibe's Comprehensive Linkology. In 1997 he released his first solo album, also titled Dr. Madd Vibe's Comprehensive Linkology, as well as his first video titled The Delusional Quandaries Of Dr. Madd Vibe. In 2000 Moore released another CD/video set titled The Yin-Yang Thang, and in 2006 he released the CD Dr. Madd Vibe's Medicine Cabinet. In 2010, Moore released The Angelo Show, funded by a kickstarter campaign. Moore also made a cameo appearance as the bandleader in the movie Idlewild, featuring Outkast members Big Boi and Andre 3000. In 2012, Moore and the Rondo Brothers released the single "Brand New Step" under Ninth Street Opus record label.

In 2020, at the beginning of the COVID quarantine, Angelo achieved sobriety and currently maintains it. He also maintains a Patreon site featuring pieces such as "The Mirror of What" and "Story Time Theater". In 2021 he played a manager in the music video for "Holier than Thou", a Metallica cover song by Off!.

In 2022, Moore participated in the "Celebrating David Bowie" tour, featuring Adrian Belew, Todd Rundgren, and others. In 2023, Moore formed a new group called Dr. MadVibe and the Missin' Links, playing alongside past and current members of Fishbone. Moore has also created a Dr. MadVibe orchestra with whom he has directed and performed in venues in the United States and Europe. In addition, he has also been performing with the New York punk band Butterbrain, contributing vocals to the song "Sapio Soirée" and is currently producing their second full-length album.

== Books ==
Moore has authored several illustrated poetry books, comic hybrids, and conceptual literary works accompanied by an audio book of music, narration and soundscape.

== Discography ==
=== Fishbone ===
- 1985 - Fishbone
- 1986 - In Your Face
- 1987 - It's a Wonderful Life (EP)
- 1988 - Truth and Soul
- 1990 - Set the Booty Up Right (EP)
- 1991 - The Reality of My Surroundings
- 1993 - Give a Monkey a Brain...
- 1996 - Chim Chim's Badass Revenge
- 2000 - The Psychotic Friends Nuttwerx
- 2002 - The Friendliest Psychosis of All
- 2002 - Live at the Temple Bar and More
- 2006 - Still Stuck in Your Throat
- 2011 - Crazy Glue ep
- 2014 - Intrinsically Intertwined (EP)
- 2023 - Fishbone (EP)
- 2025 - Stockholm Syndrome

=== Solo/Dr. MadVibe ===
- 2000 - Angelo Moore Is Dr. Madd Vibe: The Ying Yang Thang
- 2000 - Dr. Madd Vibe Comprehensive Linkology
- 2005 - Dr. Madd Vibe's Medicine Cabinet
- 2010 - Madd Vibe En Dub
- 2012 - The Angelo Show - The Olegna Phenomenon
- 2012 - Brand New Step (Ninth Street Opus)
- 2016 - Brand New Step - Centuries of Heat
- 2017 - Brand New Step - Sacrifice
- 2024 - Dr. Maddvibe and the Missin' Links

=== As a featured artist ===
- 1987 - The Boldness of Style (by Thelonious Monster, saxophone on "If I")
- 1987 - The Uplift Mofo Party Plan (by Red Hot Chili Peppers, background vocals on "Organic Anti-Beat Box Band")
- 1988 - Nothing's Shocking (by Jane's Addiction, saxophone on "Idiots Rule")
- 1989 - Back with a Bong (by Murphy's Law, saxophone)
- 1992 - Eyes Wide Open (by David Garza, backing vocals on "Virgin Mary Candle")
- 1997 - Hang-Ups (by Goldfinger, saxophone and vocals on "Carlita")
- 1998 - Boggy Depot (by Jerry Cantrell, saxophone on "Cut You In" and "Cold Piece")
- 2000 - Menace to Sobriety (by OPM, vocals on "Better Daze" and "Unda", saxophone on "Unda")
- 2001 - The Crucial Conspiracy (by The Dingees, saxophone, theremin, and vocals)
- 2003 - Barb4ry (by Ez3kiel, vocals on "Thought")
- 2004 - White Trash Beautiful (by Everlast, theremin on "Broken")
- 2006 - The Sweet Escape (by Gwen Stefani, saxophone on "Fluorescent")
- 2006 - Big Bang (by Enneri Blaka, lead vocals in "White Coats", spoken word and theremin in "Blue Collars")
- 2007 - Chronchitis (by Slightly Stoopid, vocals on "Ever Really Wanted")
- 2011 - Shoot The Freak' (by CQMD, vocals on "Gone With The Wind")
- 2011 - Higher Guns (by The Void Union, vocals on "Fly-A-Me-Away")
- 2012 - Walkin' (by Tokyo Ska Paradise Orchestra, vocals on "All Good Ska is One")
- 2012 - Top of the World (by Slightly Stoopid, vocals on "Ska Diddy")
- 2012 - Stairway to Hell (by Ugly Kid Joe, saxophone on "Love Ain't True!")
- 2013 - Dub Rockers Vol. 1 (With Bad Brains on song "Raga Dub)
- 2015 - "Coop DeVille presents Bat Funk Crazy... In 3D!!! " (by Ishan Cooper, vocals on "Science Of Pants" and "One Time Spacesuit")
- 2016 - "The Stage" (by Avenged Sevenfold on song "Sunny Disposition")
- 2021 - "SKA DREAM" (by Jeff Rosenstock saxophone solo on "p i c k i t u p")
- 2021 - "Bubble (feat. Angelo Moore) [remix]" (by The Upstarters)
- 2023 - "Sapiosexual" (by Butterbrain)

== Bibliography ==
- 2006 - Jah Jah on the Telephone
- 2006 - Nate Poecrasto
- 2010 - En Dub
- 2015 - Ska Du? Au Ska Don't
- 2024 - The Olegna Phenomenon
