= David Kahne =

American record producer

- Origin: Wyoming
- Occupations: Record producer; arranger; composer
- Instrument: Recording studio
- Website: Official website

David Kahne is an American record producer, musician, composer, and former record company executive.

== Professional career ==
Kahne started his musical career as a working musician and soon became Director of A&R for America's first punk and new wave record label, San Francisco's 415 Records; a position he operated out of a closet-sized office upstairs at The Automatt recording studio. He did artist development and in-house production and engineering there for 415 and continued to produce records for artists on the 415 label when he left Automatt to accept a position in Los Angeles as vice president of A&R for Columbia Records. He later held the same position at Warner Bros. Records.

He produced MTV Unplugged: Tony Bennett, the 1995 Grammy Award winner for Album of the Year. Other artists Kahne has produced records for include Paul McCartney, Fishbone, Sublime, the Strokes, the Rubens, Sugar Ray, the Bangles, Translator, Romeo Void, Stevie Nicks, Teddy Thompson, New Order, Kelly Clarkson, Lana Del Rey, the Outfield, Renee Fleming, Brenda Kahn, Regina Spektor, Ingrid Michaelson, 78violet, and Alexz Johnson, and composer John Moran on his 1995 opera Mathew in the School of Life which featured poet Allen Ginsberg. He also worked with Linkin Park on some of their earlier studio work after signing with Warner.

Kahne wrote and produced the soundtrack to Bloom, a 2003 film written and directed by Sean Walsh based on James Joyce's Ulysses. and he composed and performed the score for the 2011 film Magic Trip, about Ken Kesey and the Merry Pranksters. He also scored the Alex Gibney film, The Armstrong Lie, about cyclist Lance Armstrong's comeback and subsequent downfall. As of 2015 David Kahne is working on setting a chapter of James Joyce's Finnegans Wake to music, for the Waywords and Meansigns project.

Kahne also designed Fishbone's logo, which he created with MacPaint on an early model Apple Macintosh 128K.

== Works ==
- Albums produced by David Kahne
