= Parliament discography =

- Studio albums: 10
- Live albums: 2
- Compilation albums: 11
- Singles: 20

Discography of Parliament, influential George Clinton-led funk group.

== Studio albums ==
Year	Title	Peak chart positions		Certifications (sales thresholds)
Year	Title	US	US R&B	Certifications (sales thresholds)
1970	Osmium: Released: July 7, 1970; Label: Invictus; Formats: LP Vinyl, compact disc	—	—	
1974	Up for the Down Stroke: Released: July 3, 1974; Label: Casablanca; Formats: LP Vinyl, compact disc	—	17	
1975	Chocolate City: Released: March 12, 1975; Label: Casablanca; Formats: LP Vinyl, compact disc	91	18	
1975	Mothership Connection: Released: December 15, 1975; Label: Casablanca; Formats: LP Vinyl, compact disc	13	4	US: Platinum
1976	The Clones of Dr. Funkenstein: Released: July 20, 1976; Label: Casablanca; Formats: LP Vinyl, compact disc	20	3	US: Gold
1977	Funkentelechy vs. the Placebo Syndrome: Released: November 28, 1977; Label: Casablanca; Formats: LP Vinyl, compact disc	13	2	US: Platinum
1978	Motor Booty Affair: Released: November 20, 1978; Label: Casablanca; Formats: LP Vinyl, compact disc	23	2	US: Gold
1979	Gloryhallastoopid: Released: November 28, 1979; Label: Casablanca; Formats: LP Vinyl, compact disc	44	3	US: Gold
1980	Trombipulation: Released: December 5, 1980; Label: Casablanca; Formats: LP Vinyl, compact disc	61	16	
2018	Medicaid Fraud Dogg: Released: May 22, 2018; Label: C Kunspyruhzy Records; Formats: Digital download, compact disc, LP Vinyl	—	—	
"—" denotes releases that did not chart or were not released in that territory.

== Live albums ==
Year	Album details	Peak chart positions		Certifications (sales thresholds)
Year	Album details	US	US R&B	Certifications (sales thresholds)
1977	Live: P-Funk Earth Tour: Released: May 5, 1977; Label: Casablanca; Format:	29	6	US: Gold
1996	Live, 1976-1993: Released: Label: Sequel; Format:	—	—	
"—" denotes releases that did not chart or were not released in that territory.

== Compilation albums ==
Year	Album details	Certifications (sales thresholds)
1984	Parliament's Greatest Hits: Released: Label: Casablanca; Format:	US: Gold
1991	The Best Nonstop Mix Compilation: Released: Label: Polystar (Japan only); Format:	
1993	Tear the Roof Off 1974-1980: Released: 1993; Label: Casablanca; Format:	
1994	Greatest Hits 1972-1993: Released: Label: AEM; Format:	
1995	The Best of Parliament: Give Up the Funk: Released: Label: Mercury Funk; Format:	
1995	First Thangs: Released: Label: Fantasy Jazz; Format:	
1996	Rhenium: Released: Label: HDH; Format:	
1997	The Early Years: Released: Label: Deep Beats; Format:	
1999	12" Collection & More: Released: Label: Casablanca; Format:	
2000	20th Century Masters - The Millennium Collection: The Best of Parliament: Released: Label: Mercury Nashville; Format:	
2000	Get Funked Up: The Ultimate Collection: Released: Label: Spectrum Records; Format:	
2005	Gold: Released: Label: Island; Format:	
2007	The Casablanca Years: 1974–1980: Released: Label: Casablanca (Japan only); Format: 9-CD box set	

== Singles ==
Year	Title	Peak chart positions			Certifications	Album
Year	Title	US	US R&B	US Dance	Certifications	Album
1971	"Breakdown"	107	30	—		Osmium UK version
1974	"Up for the Down Stroke"	63	10	—		Up for the Down Stroke
1974	"Testify"	—	77	—		Up for the Down Stroke
1975	"Chocolate City"	94	24	—		Chocolate City
1975	"Ride On"	—	64	—		Chocolate City
1976	"P. Funk (Wants to Get Funked Up)"	—	33	—		Mothership Connection
1976	"Give Up the Funk (Tear the Roof off the Sucker)"	15	5	—	US: Gold	Mothership Connection
1976	"Mothership Connection (Star Child)"	—	26	—		Mothership Connection
1976	"Do That Stuff"	—	22	—		The Clones of Dr. Funkenstein
1977	"Dr. Funkenstein"	102	43	—		The Clones of Dr. Funkenstein
1977	"Fantasy Is Reality"	—	54	—		Live: P-Funk Earth Tour
1977	"Bop Gun (Endangered Species)"	102	14	—		Funkentelechy vs. the Placebo Syndrome
1978	"Flash Light"	16	1	—	US: Gold	Funkentelechy vs. the Placebo Syndrome
1978	"Funkentelechy"	—	27	—		Funkentelechy vs. the Placebo Syndrome
1978	"Aqua Boogie (A Psychoalphadiscobetabioaquadoloop)"	89	1	—		Motor Booty Affair
1979	"Rumpofsteelskin"	—	63	—		Motor Booty Affair
1979	"Party People"	—	39	—		Gloryhallastoopid
1980	"Theme from the Black Hole"	—	8	69		Gloryhallastoopid
1980	"The Big Bang Theory"	—	50	—		Gloryhallastoopid
1980	"Agony of DeFeet"	—	7	—		Trombipulation
2018	"I'm Gon Make U Sick O'Me"	—	—	—		Medicaid Fraud Dogg
"—" denotes releases that did not chart or were not released in that territory.
