= Tear the Roof Off 1974–1980 =

Tear The Roof Off: 1974–1980

Compilation album by Parliament
- Released: May 18, 1993
- Recorded: 1974–1980
- Genre: Funk
- Length: 2:30:44
- Label: Casablanca

Parliament chronology
The Best Nonstop Mix Compilation (1991)	Tear The Roof Off: 1974–1980 (1993)	20th Century Masters - The Millennium Collection (2000)

Professional ratings
Review scores
Source	Rating
Allmusic	5/5 stars

Tear the Roof Off: 1974–1980 is a 2-CD compilation album by the funk group Parliament featuring songs recorded for Casablanca Records during the band's career with that label from 1974 to 1980. The compilation was released in 1993. The compilation includes some single edits and extended 12-inch single edits of selected songs, but no previously unreleased material, except for a slightly longer version of "Testify" that restores a deleted guitar introduction. The CD booklet contains historical articles from music writers Greg Tate and Tom Vickers, who served as the band's Minister of Information from 1976 until 1980.

== Track listing ==
Disc One
No.	Title	Writer(s)	Length
1.	"P-Funk (Wants to Get Funked Up)" (from Mothership Connection)	Clinton, Collins, Worrell	7:40
2.	"Up for the Down Stroke" (from Up for the Down Stroke)	Clinton, Collins, Haskins, Worrell	5:08
3.	"Bop Gun (Endangered Species)" (from Funkentelechy vs. the Placebo Syndrome)	Clinton, Shider, Collins	8:29
4.	"Dr. Funkenstein's Supergroovalisticprosifunkstication Medley: Let's Take It to the Stage/Take Your Dead Ass Home (Say Som'n Nasty)" (from Live: P-Funk Earth Tour)	Clinton, Collins, Shider, Clinton, Shider, Worrell, Goins	5:06
5.	"Mothership Connection (Star Child)" (from Mothership Connection)	Clinton, Collins, Worrell	6:12
6.	"Dr. Funkenstein" (from The Clones of Dr. Funkenstein)	Clinton, Collins, Worrell	5:45
7.	"Testify" (extended version of track from Up for the Down Stroke)	Clinton, Taylor	3:54
8.	"Mr. Wiggles" (from Motor Booty Affair)	Clinton, Worrell, Hampton	6:43
9.	"Aqua Boogie (A Psychoalphadiscobetabioaquadoloop)" (extended 12-inch single edit of track from Motor Booty Affair)	Clinton, Collins, Worrell	9:23
10.	"All Your Goodies are Gone" (from Up for the Down Stroke)	Clinton, Haskins, Nelson	5:04
11.	"Do That Stuff" (from The Clones of Dr. Funkenstein)	Clinton, Shider, Worrell	4:48
12.	"Party People" (single edit of track from Gloryhallastoopid)	Clinton, Collins, Shider	4:40

Disc Two
No.	Title	Writer(s)	Length
1.	"Prelude" (from The Clones of Dr. Funkenstein)	Clinton, Worrell	1:40
2.	"Give Up The Funk (Tear The Roof Off The Sucker)" (from Mothership Connection)	Clinton, Collins, Brailey	5:46
3.	"Chocolate City" (from Chocolate City)	Clinton, Collins, Worrell	5:37
4.	"Funkentelechy" (from Funkentelechy vs. the Placebo Syndrome)	Clinton, Collins	10:56
5.	"Theme from the Black Hole" (12-inch single edit [combined with next track] of track from Gloryhallastoopid)	Collins, Clinton, Theracon	4:38
6.	"The Big Bang Theory" (12-inch single edit [combined with previous track] of track from Gloryhallastoopid)	Sterling, Dunbar, Clinton	7:10
7.	"Children of Production (Live)" (from Live: P-Funk Earth Tour)	Clinton, Collins, Worrell	2:50
8.	"Flash Light" (extended 12-inch single edit of track from Funkentelechy vs. the Placebo Syndrome)	Clinton, Worrell, Collins	10:42
9.	"Ride On" (from Chocolate City)	Clinton, Collins, Worrell	3:34
10.	"Fantasy Is Reality" (from Live: P-Funk Earth Tour)	Clinton, Worrell, Ware	6:38
11.	"Rumpofsteelskin" (from Motor Booty Affair)	Clinton, Collins	5:43
12.	"Agony of Defeet" (from Trombipulation)	Dunbar, Sterling, Clinton	6:43
13.	"Funkin' for Fun" (from The Clones of Dr. Funkenstein)	Clinton, Shider, Goins	5:55
