= Gold (Parliament album) =

Compilation album by Parliament
- Released: March 1, 2005
- Recorded: 1974–1980
- Genre: Funk
- Label: Island
- Producer: George Clinton

Parliament chronology
20th Century Masters - The Millennium Collection (2000)	Gold (2005)	The Casablanca Years: 1974-1980 (2007)

Gold is a two CD compilation by the Funk band Parliament. The album was released by Universal Music in 2005. It essentially updates the 1993 compilation Tear the Roof Off 1974–1980. There are slight differences between Gold and Tear the Roof Off. First, Gold presents the songs in chronological order. Gold also uses shorter versions of the tracks "Fantasy Is Reality" and "Agony Of Defeet", as well as featuring remastered versions of all tracks and a slightly different track listing.

It received a four and a half star rating from AllMusic.

== Track listing ==
=== Disc One ===
1. "Up for the Down Stroke" (Clinton, Collins, Haskins, Worrell) – 5:07
2. "Testify" (Clinton, Taylor) – 3:54
3. "All Your Goodies are Gone" (Clinton, Haskins, Nelson) – 5:04
4. "Chocolate City" (Clinton, Collins, Worrell) - 5:35
5. "Ride On" (Clinton, Collins, Worrell) - 3:34
6. "P-Funk (Wants to Get Funked Up)" (Clinton, Collins, Worrell) – 7:39
7. "Give Up The Funk (Tear The Roof Off The Sucker)" (Clinton, Collins, Brailey) - 5:46
8. "Mothership Connection (Star Child)" (Clinton, Collins, Worrell) – 6:12
9. "Handcuffs" - 4:01
10. "Do That Stuff" (Clinton, Shider, Worrell) – 4:47
11. "Dr. Funkenstein" (Clinton, Collins, Worrell) – 5:42
12. "Funkin' for Fun" (Clinton, Shider, Goins) - 5:55
13. "Let's Take It to the Stage/Take Your Dead Ass Home (Say Som'n Nasty)" (Live) (Clinton, Collins, Shider / Clinton, Shider, Worrell, Goins) – 5:11
14. "Fantasy Is Reality" (Clinton, Worrell, Ware) - 5:58

=== Disc Two ===
1. "Flash Light" (12" Version) (Clinton, Worrell, Collins) - 10:42
2. "Bop Gun (Endangered Species)" (Clinton, Shider, Collins) – 8:28
3. "Funkentelechy" (Clinton, Collins) - 10:55
4. "Mr. Wiggles" (Clinton, Worrell, Hampton) – 6:44
5. "Aqua Boogie (A Psychoalphadiscobetabioaquadoloop)" (12" Version) (Clinton, Collins, Worrell) - 9:22
6. "Rumpofsteelskin" (Clinton, Collins) - 5:35
7. "Party People" (Clinton, Collins, Shider) – 4:45
8. "Theme from the Black Hole" (Collins, Clinton, Theracon) – 4:38
9. "The Big Bang Theory" (Sterling, Dunbar, Clinton) – 7:00
10. "Agony of Defeet" (Single Edit) (Dunbar, Sterling, Clinton) - 4:25
