= 20th Century Masters – The Millennium Collection: The Best of Parliament =

Compilation album by Parliament
- Released: January 25, 2000
- Recorded: 1974–1980
- Genre: P-Funk
- Length: 67:30
- Label: Mercury

Parliament chronology
Tear the Roof Off 1974–1980 (1993)	20th Century Masters – The Millennium Collection: The Best of Parliament (2000)	Gold (2005)

Professional ratings
Review scores
Source	Rating
Tom Hull – on the Web	A

20th Century Masters – The Millennium Collection: The Best of Parliament is a compilation album by the American Funk band Parliament released in 2000 as part Universal Music's "Millennium Collection" series. 20th Century Masters uses eight of the ten songs from Parliament's Greatest Hits (1984), and is essentially an update of that collection. Album versions of the songs "Up for the Down Stroke"; "Mothership Connection (Star Child)" and "Aqua Boogie" are also used in place of the edited versions used on Greatest Hits.

== Track listing ==
1. "P-Funk (Wants to Get Funked Up)" (Clinton, Worrell, Collins) 7:40
2. "Give Up the Funk (Tear the Roof off the Sucker)" (Clinton, Collins, Brailey) 5:45
3. "Flash Light" (Clinton, Worrell, Collins) 5:47
4. "Dr. Funkenstein" (Clinton, Collins, Worrell) – 5:43
5. "Up for the Down Stroke" (Clinton, Collins, Worrell, Haskins) 5:07
6. "Chocolate City" (Clinton, Collins, Worrell) 5:36
7. "Bop Gun (Endangered Species)" (Clinton, Collins, Shider) 8:28
8. "Testify" (Clinton, Taylor) 4:04
9. "Aqua Boogie (A Psychoalphadiscobetabioaquadoloop)" (Clinton, Collins, Worrell) 6:42
10. "Mothership Connection (Star Child)" (Clinton, Collins, Worrell) 6:13
11. "Agony of Defeet" (Dunbar, Sterling, Clinton) 6:25
