= The Casablanca Years: 1974–1980 =

2007 CD box set by Parliament

Box set by Parliament
- Released: 2007
- Recorded: 1974–1980
- Genre: P-Funk
- Label: Casablanca
- Producer: George Clinton

Parliament chronology
Gold (2005)	The Casablanca Years: 1974–1980 (2007)	Medicaid Fraud Dogg (2018)

The Casablanca Years: 1974–1980 is a CD box set by the Funk band Parliament. The box set was released by Universal Music-Japan on August 22, 2007. This box compiles all nine Parliament albums released by Casablanca Records between 1974 and 1980. The box set includes the following albums:

- Up for the Down Stroke (1974)
- Chocolate City (1975)
- Mothership Connection (1975)
- The Clones of Dr. Funkenstein (1976)
- Live: P-Funk Earth Tour (1977)
- Funkentelechy Vs. the Placebo Syndrome (1977)
- Motor Booty Affair (1978)
- Gloryhallastoopid (1979)
- Trombipulation (1980)

The set includes an 84-page booklet with liner notes written in Japanese, as well as lyrics to all of the songs included in the set. In addition, all of the individual CDs actually appear in mini-LP format and contain all of the extras (posters, cut outs) that were included in the original vinyl releases, shrunken down to fit into the CD jacket. It was a limited edition release and has never been distributed outside Japan.
