= Parliament's Greatest Hits =

Greatest hits album by Parliament
- Released: 1984
- Recorded: 1974–1979
- Genre: P-funk
- Length: 51:28
- Label: Casablanca
- Producer: George Clinton, Tom Vickers

Parliament chronology
Trombipulation (1980)	Parliament's Greatest Hits (1984)	The Best Nonstop Mix Compilation (1991)

Professional ratings
Review scores
Source	Rating
AllMusic	4.5/5 stars
Robert Christgau	A
The Encyclopedia of Popular Music	4/5 stars
The Rolling Stone Album Guide	4.5/5 stars
Spin Alternative Record Guide	10/10

Parliament's Greatest Hits is a compilation album by the American funk band Parliament, released in 1984 by Casablanca Records. It contains 10 Parliament singles recorded between 1974 and 1979. It omits songs from Trombipulation.

The album cover for Parliament's Greatest Hits is notable in that it features no artwork from any of the established P-Funk album illustrators. The compilation was produced by Tom Vickers, who formerly served as Minister Of Information for the band from 1976 to 1980. It was the last P-Funk album to be certified gold (500,000 copies sold). The album was the first to be released in the compact disc format.

== Critical reception ==
AllMusic wrote that "concentrating solely on Parliament's singles actually illustrates the depth of their vision and influence, since there are no half-baked ideas surrounding these ten stunning songs."

== Track listing ==
1. "Up for the Down Stroke" (Clinton, Collins, Worrell, Haskins) 3:20
2. "Chocolate City" (Clinton, Collins, Worrell) 5:36
3. "P-Funk (Wants to Get Funked Up)" (Clinton, Worrell, Collins) 7:34
4. "Mothership Connection (Star Child)" (Clinton, Collins, Worrell) 3:07
5. "Give Up the Funk (Tear the Roof off the Sucker)" (Clinton, Collins, Brailey) 5:43
6. "Do That Stuff" (Clinton, Shider, Worrell) 3:38
7. "Bop Gun (Endangered Species)" (Clinton, Collins, Shider) 8:28
8. "Flash Light" (Clinton, Worrell, Collins) 4:28
9. "Aqua Boogie (A Psychoalphadiscobetabioaquadoloop)" (Clinton, Collins, Worrell) 4:27
10. "Theme from the Black Hole" (Collins, Clinton, Theracon) 4:37
