= P-Funk mythology =

Pop music personas

The P-Funk mythology is a group of recurring characters, themes, and ideas primarily contained in the output of George Clinton's bands Parliament and Funkadelic. This so-called funkology was outlined in album liner notes and song lyrics, in addition to album artwork, costumes, advertisements, and stage banter. P-Funk's "Dr. Seussian afrofunk" is often cited as a critical component of the Afrofuturism movement.

== Background ==
George Clinton's space-age mythology began to emerge with the release of Funkadelic's self-titled debut album in 1970. Later that same year, Parliament released their debut album Osmium. Clinton's cosmology was largely absent from the latter release, and it took longer to blossom in Parliament's output. Generally speaking, Parliament was a dance-oriented band, while Funkadelic was more serious and psychedelic.

The two bands shared personnel, and Clinton blurred the lines between them both by referring to his touring band as "A Parliafunkadelicment Thang". The shorthand for this conglomerate became "P-Funk", and it grew to include offshoots like P-Funk All Stars, Bootsy's Rubber Band, Parlet, The Brides of Funkenstein, The Horny Horns, and solo albums by Eddie Hazel and Bernie Worrell. By the mid 70s, P-Funk was a massively successful group of acts. A ranking of the top live acts of 1977 included three bands from the conglomerate in the top fifteen slots.

After the bands' earlier releases, Clinton began to feel that something more conceptual was in order, and he expressed deep admiration for The Who's Tommy and The Beatles' Sgt. Pepper's Lonely Hearts Club Band as "the classiest two pieces of music I had ever seen where everything related to each other. So I wanted to do one of those kinds of things." Clinton settled on the extraterrestrial concept because of its originality, saying, "Put niggas in places that you don't usually see 'em. And nobody had seen 'em on no spaceships! Once you seen 'em sittin' on spaceships like it was Cadillac then it was funny, cool."

The primary author of the P-Funk mythology aside from George Clinton was Pedro Bell, who illustrated the liners for many of P-Funk's releases. Bell's felt-tip illustrations included prolonged essays that expanded the mythos of Clinton's lyrics with a complementary syntax that "forged a new realm of black language". Though Bell coined terms like "Rumpasaurus" and made extensive contributions to the P-Funk mythology, his work has been largely overlooked.

Clinton has pointed to the show The Outer Limits as an influence in his elaborate narrative, but more importantly, he and Bootsy Collins allegedly encountered a UFO together while driving to Detroit. Clinton recalls light bouncing from one side of the street to the other, and remarking to Collins, "The Mothership was angry with us for giving up the funk without permission." The bouncing light eventually focused on their car, and Clinton asked Collins to "step on it".

The P-Funk mythology was just one tool in the conglomerate's arsenal. By the mid-1970s, Clinton was rebranding funk as many things at once, "an aesthetic, a marketing ploy, a black cultural nationalist battle-plan and a way of being if not a spiritual discipline." He was drawing on everything from "hipster lingo of the beboppers, early black radio deejays and the apocalyptic anti-slavemassa edicts of the Nation of Islam" as well as the Yippies and the Black Panthers. Clinton was positioning P-Funk as a "radical response to the American police state" and "the antithesis of everything that was sterile, one-dimensional, monochromatic, arhythmic and otherwise against freedom of bodily expression in the known universe." In its simplest iteration, Clinton posited that "funk" was equivalent with the "truth".

== Funkadelic ==
Funkadelic albums are generally more abstract than Parliament's. Rather than tell the story of a cast of characters, the mythology of Funkadelic is defined as a socially conscious spiritualism. One of the defining traits of the P-Funk mythology is that it is indeed a form of social commentary in that it "took all the cheese America had to offer and ran with it, taking the fashions and technology of the day to their ultimate, preposterous conclusions, amplifying the aesthetics of the 70s into a throbbing, fish-eyed cartoon of itself, and in so doing glorified American culture and their role in its continuing evolution."

On "Mommy, What's a Funkadelic?", the opening track of Funkadelic's 1970 self-titled debut album, Clinton's cosmology starts to emerge with the lines, "By the way, my name is Funk...I am not of your world...Hold still, baby, I won't do you no harm...I am Funkadelic, dedicated to the feeling of good.'" The same introduction of "Funkadelic" is repeated at the outset of the album's closing track "What Is Soul".

On Funkadelic's second album, Free Your Mind... and Your Ass Will Follow (1970), funk is posited as a path to enlightenment in the title track: "Open up your funky mind and you can fly...Free your mind and your ass will follow...The kingdom of heaven is within". This sentiment is echoed in subsequent songs like "Standing on the Verge of Getting It On" (1974) which contains the verse, "Music is designed to free your funky mind. We have come to help you cope out into another reality". A more scatological iteration comes in the song "Promentalshitbackwashpsychosis Enema Squad (The Doo Doo Chasers)" (1978) where "funk" is defined as "the P-Preparation, The prune juice of the mind, A mental, musical bowel movement, Groove-lax...A psychological turd remover, A neurological enema".

Many of the lyrics in P-Funk songs imply that the band is merely a medium for a godhead that takes the form of funk. At other times, the band or Clinton are cast as priestly beings tasked with guiding humanity through music. In the song "Phunklords", they sing, "We are the Phunklords...Sent to you from eons away just to spread some funk your way". At the beginning of "The Electronic Spanking of War Babies", Clinton explains that he was "adopted by aliens" at the age of 17, and that "they have long since programmed me to return with this message." The liner notes of Standing on the Verge of Getting It On explain that, "On the Eighth Day, the Cosmic Strumpet of Mother Nature was spawned to envelope this Third Planet in FUNKADELICAL VIBRATIONS. And she birthed Apostles Ra, Hendrix, Stone, and CLINTON to preserve all funkiness of man unto eternity... But! Fraudulent forces of obnoxious JIVATION grew...only seedling GEORGE remained! As it came to be, he did indeed begat FUNKADELIC to restore Order Within the Universe."

The title of the band's third album, Maggot Brain (1971), became a lasting concept in the P-Funk mythology. The title track opens the album with the incantation, "Mother Earth is pregnant for the third time...for y'all have knocked her up. I have tasted the maggots in the mind of the Universe." Maggot brain is a "state of mind" with potentially disastrous consequences if nothing is done about it. The incantation on "Maggot Brain" concludes, "I knew I had to rise above it all or drown in my own shit." The song "Super Stupid" links maggot brain to fear with lyrics about a protagonist who snorts heroin thinking it is cocaine. Super Stupid is said to have a "maggot brain" and to have "lost the fight and the winner is fear". The album's liner notes reinforce the connection between maggot brain and fear by quoting from the writing of Robert de Grimston, "Fear is the root of man's destruction of himself. Without Fear there is no blame. Without blame there is no conflict. Without conflict there is no destruction."

The liner notes for One Nation Under a Groove (1978) are a typical example of how the P-Funk mythology expanded on song lyrics to develop a sprawling, satirical narrative. The liner includes a summary of "The Funk Wars 1984 B.C.", which is a parody of Star Wars. Just like George Lucas' movie, the Funk Wars take place "ONCE UPON A TIME... in a faraway parallel universe". Instead of Darth Vader, the villain is "BARFT VADA", and his soldiers wield "Blight Sabers". VADA has outlawed funk in favor of disco to "maintain mental constipation" and prevent Funkadelica from "deprogramming the population". The hero, JASPER SPATIC, has invented a Throb Gun, which he unleashes at a disco, triggering an epic battle and defeat for Barft Vada. The story ends with Jasper pondering what would happen the next time Barft Vada caused trouble, hoping that someone would warn people to "THINK! IT AIN'T ILLEGAL YET!", which is a chant heard in the live version of "Maggot Brain" that closes the album.

== Parliament ==
Four years after their debut album, Parliament released their second album which makes the first direct reference to the mythology that had taken root in Funkadelic's early albums. On "I Just Got Back (From the Fantasy, Ahead of Our Time in the Four Lands of Ellet)", the narrator announces "I just got back from another world". It is located "across the mountain and through the seas, past the moon, beyond all the things that we've dreamed about". The place was so beautiful that the narrator did not want to leave, but felt that he must return to help the listener be a parent and to "show you the way, the right way, I feel you gotta live". Though the song was written by a street performer named Peter Chase, it bears all the narrative hallmarks of the P-Funk cosmology, with its voyage to a distant planet and a return after a long absence bearing enlightenment for a suffering audience.

=== Mothership Connection ===
The P-Funk mythology begins in earnest on Parliament's 1975 album Mothership Connection, which features Clinton emerging from a spaceship on the cover. The first track, "P. Funk (Wants to Get Funked Up)" begins in the same way as the title track from Chocolate City, the band's previous album. A DJ talks directly to the audience as if he is on the radio, but on this album, the station call sign is announced as "WEFUNK". It is broadcasting from outer space "directly from the Mothership". The DJ reveals his name as "Sir Lollipop Man, alias the Long-Haired Sucker." He exhorts the listener to lay their body on the radio in order to be healed by the music because "Funk not only moves, it can re-move".

In the next song, "Mothership Connection (Star Child)", the titular Starchild explains, "I am the Mothership Connection" and that "we have returned to claim the Pyramids." Starchild invites the listener to "come on up to the Mothership". He later asks, "Are you hip to Easter Island? The Bermuda Triangle?", reinforcing the ancient aliens imagery of the song. "Unfunky UFO" depicts a spaceship full of people from "a dying world" who sing, "We're unfunky and we're obsolete". They are desperate for some funk, wanting to "take your funk and make it mine" and begging the listener to "show me how to funk like you do". This primal need for funk is echoed in the highest-charting song from the album, "Give Up the Funk (Tear the Roof off the Sucker)", with its pleas of "Give up the funk...we gotta have that funk". The album's closing track introduces an important concept in the P-Funk mythology with its title: "Night Of The Thumpasorous Peoples". The lyrics are primarily "gaga googoo", but the Thumpasorous lineage is a recurring feature in subsequent releases.

Parliament's follow-up album, The Clones of Dr. Funkenstein, is the motherlode for the narrative of their legendary stage show. The first half of the album introduces key characters like Dr. Funkenstein and expands on terms like "Thumpasorous".

=== Funkentelechy Vs. the Placebo Syndrome ===
With the P-Funk Earth Tour in high gear, Parliament released Funkentelechy Vs. the Placebo Syndrome in 1977. The first track, "Bop Gun (Endangered Species)", weaponizes funk as a self-protection device: "When the syndrome is around, don't let your guard down. All you got to do is call on the funk...to dance is a protection...On guard! Protect yourself!...Shoot them with the bop gun" The next song, "Sir Nose d'Voidoffunk (Pay Attention - B3M)", introduces the title character who claims to be "the subliminal seducer" and "devoid of funk". Sir Nose claims that Starchild may have won a battle, but that he will return. Later in the song, Starchild appears, "chasing noses away", and proclaims himself "Protector of the Pleasure Principle". "Nose" instantly became a recurring term for negativity in the P-Funk mythology, prompting lines like "a funk a day keeps the Nose away". The concept for the character originated in "The Pinocchio Theory" by Bootsy's Rubber Band, which asserts that if "you fake the funk; your nose got to grow". Sir Nose is "Cro-Nasal", predating the Cro-Magnon and the Neanderthal.

"Funkentelechy" sees a return of DJ Lollipop as he narrates a free-association meditation on overstimulation, which he terms "urge overkill", from things like pills and commercial jingles for Big Macs and Whoppers. Playing off Aristotle's concept of entelechy, DJ Lollipop, who also claims the name of "Mr. Prolong" during the song, reassures the listener that "this is mood de-control" and the "pleasure principle has been rescued". The last song on the album, "Flash Light", was Parliament's first #1 single. It contains a glancing reference to the P-Funk mythology when the Nose finds the funk, with the aid of the titular device, and begins to "Get on down". The ethos of the song, and Parliament as well, is that even the Nose can become funky because "Everybody's got a little light under the sun".

=== Later albums ===
Parliament's 1978 album Motor Booty Affair begins with "Mr. Wiggles". The titular character is a variation on DJ Lollipop. Now, WEFUNK is located in Emerald City in downtown Atlantis. The title character of the second song is "Rumpofsteelskin" who is so unfunky that "he don't rust and he don't bend". With the album set underwater, swimming becomes akin to dancing, and in "Aqua Boogie (A Psychoalphadiscobetabioaquadoloop)" Sir Nose returns to announce that he cannot swim and hates water. Overton Loyd's album art depicted the motto "We got ta raise Atlantis to the top", signifying the need for upward social mobility among African-Americans.

On Gloryhallastoopid (1979), Sir Nose defeats Starchild and turns him into a mule in "Theme From The Black Hole". While gloating over his victory, Sir Nose alludes to multiple songs from Funkentelechy and Clones with taunts like "Where's your flashlight? Where's your bop gun? Where's the Doctor (Funkenstein), Starchild?".

== Stage show ==
By the mid-1970s, Clinton had flooded the market with P-Funk and sought to capitalize by mounting a stage show he called "Mothership Connection", also known as the P-Funk Earth Tour. The stage show employed the techniques of glam rock productions like David Bowie's Diamond Dogs Tour. P-Funk even used KISS' rehearsal hangar in Newburgh, NY to prepare for the tour. One of the recurring highlights of the show was the arrival of the Mothership, a prop designed by Jules Fisher. Casablanca Records underwrote the $200,000 budget for the show, which featured intergalactic outfits and space-age imagery. Clinton viewed the show as an antidote to the "placebo syndrome" of anodyne mass market music.

The film of P-Funk's Halloween 1976 concert at the Houston Summit provides an excellent snapshot of what the Earth Tour production was like. The incantation from "Prelude" from The Clones of Dr. Funkenstein plays in darkness as spotlights illuminate a pyramid with the Eye of Providence at its summit, echoing the official seal of the United States:

Funk upon a time, in the days of the Funkapus, the concept of specially-designed Afronauts capable of funkatizing galaxies was first laid on man-child.
But was later repossessed, and placed among the secrets of the pyramids until a more positive attitude towards this most sacred phenomenon, Clone Funk, could be acquired...

...It would wait, along with its co-inhabitants of kings and pharaohs, like sleeping beauties with a kiss that would release them to multiply in the image of the chosen one: Dr Funkenstein...

The show is loosely structured around preparing the pyramid for the resurrection of the Afronauts, with dim oblations paid by members of the troupe during the first half of the set. Occasionally, an animated film based on Overton Loyd's album art would be shown during the concerts. The film loosely follows the plot of Funkentelechy Vs. The Placebo Syndrome with Starchild and his Bop Gun facing off against Sir Nose and his Snooze Gun. During the film, band members would encourage the audience to shine their flashlights to help the Mothership return. Concertgoers could purchase customized flashlights as part of the tour's merchandising.

A half hour later, the band plays "Children of Production" which expands on the clone imagery of "Prelude". The song is sung by the titular "children" who explain that Dr. Funkenstein "forenotioned the shortcomings of your condition" and cloned the children to "blow the cobwebs out your mind". The band launches into "Mothership Connection" which explicitly links back to the concepts of "Prelude" in its introduction, "Citizens of the Universe, Recording Angels, we have returned to claim the pyramids, partying on the Mothership." The band vamps over the closing mantra of the song, "Swing down, sweet chariot. Stop, and let me ride" as guitarist Glenn Goins exhorts the audience to sing along. Other members of the band warn that the mothership will not come if the audience does not do its part. Goins starts to repeatedly wail, "I see the Mothership coming!" as the spaceship finally comes into view, shrouded in smoke and shooting off a fusillade of magnesium sparks.

After the Mothership lands, Clinton appears at the top of a staircase as if he has emerged from the spaceship. He is dressed as Dr. Funkenstein, and the band launches into his titular song where he sings, "...call me the big pill, Dr. Funkenstein, the disco fiend with the monster sound, the cool ghoul with the bump transplant". Dr. Funkenstein proclaims that he is "preoccupied and dedicated to the preservation of the motion of hips", to which the Children of Production reply, "We love to funk you, Funkenstein. Your funk is the best!"

The parody of "Swing Down Sweet Chariot" is in line with so much of P-Funk's work, which relies heavily on appropriation. That this particular song is reworked to herald the arrival of the Mothership, which offers salvation from an unfunky existence, also aligns with the provenance of the song. Like many spirituals, "Swing Down Sweet Chariot" read superficially about deliverance to Heaven on a chariot like Elijah, but it also contained coded messages about escape to the North. By appropriating the song to score the arrival of the Mothership, it becomes a modern-day chariot sent to deliver the audience not back home to Africa, but to Outer Space. Clinton's stage show created a narrative link from the Egyptian pyramids, which often were used to symbolize black pride in a past achievements, to a Utopian vision of existence off-world. P-Funk was telling a tale of once and future greatness to a marginalized audience in a time of intense social upheaval. Their music afforded the black community an alternative to their oppressive environment with tales of the potential for black wealth and power.

== P-Funk mythology in popular culture ==
- The 2004 video game Grand Theft Auto: San Andreas features George Clinton as the Funktipus, the DJ of the in-game funk radio station Bounce FM, which is apparently broadcast from the Party Ship.
- Adult Swim's 2010 animated special Freaknik: The Musical featured psychedelic aliens voiced by George Clinton and Bootsy Collins.
- Playing on the storyline of Mothership Connection, an episode of The Mighty Boosh, "The Legend of Old Gregg" (season 2, episode 5), depicts the Funk as a living, multi-breasted extraterrestrial entity accidentally tossed overboard the Mothership by George Clinton. The episode further contains a sly reference to mythology with offerings of maggot-laced items at the local pub frequented by stodgy local fishermen. Near the episode's end, transformed by milk from the Funk, characters Howard Moon and Vince Noir perform a maritime parody of "Give Up the Funk (Tear the Roof off the Sucker)".
- Filmmaker Yvonne Smith created an animated segment for her documentary, Parliament-Funkadelic: One Nation Under a Groove, featuring a P-Funk mythology-inspired character, "Afronaut." The character was voiced by comedian Eddie Griffin. The documentary first aired on PBS in October 2005 as part of the Independent Lens series.
- In the 2015 episode of Doctor Who, "The Zygon Invasion," the Doctor refers to himself as 'Doctor Funkenstein'.
