= Chocolate City =

Chocolate City may refer to:

- Chocolate City (album), a 1975 album by Parliament
- Chocolate City (film), a 2015 film
- Chocolate City: Vegas Strip, a 2017 sequel
- Chocolate City, a 1994 film by Rob Hardy
- "Chocolate City" (song), a 1975 song from the album Chocolate City
- Chocolate City (music label), a Nigeria-based record label
- Chocolate City Records, a defunct U.S. record label
- Chocolate City speech, a 2006 speech by New Orleans mayor Ray Nagin
- Chocolate City, Liberia, a district of Monrovia
- Hershey, Pennsylvania, home of The Hershey Company
- Washington, D.C., capital of the United States
- York, United Kingdom, nicknamed the Chocolate City
