= Overton Loyd =

American artist

Overton Loyd (born April 20, 1954) is an American artist. Loyd created the cover art for the Parliament album Motor Booty Affair and several other records. His style of art varies often from work to work, and can range from loose sketches and paintings to fully fleshed out pieces. He is a friend of George Clinton of Parliament, and most of the subjects for his art are either Clinton or Parliament.

== Motor Booty Affair cover ==
Loyd's contribution to Motor Booty Affair was considerable. The original LP was released in several different configurations. The main release consisted of a gate-fold album cover, with Loyd's artwork on the front and back covers. His illustrations included cartoon portraits of some of the "characters" mentioned in the songs on the album, including "Mr. Wiggles the Worm." There was also a picture disk, with Loyd's illustration printed directly on the vinyl LP. Finally, there was a special edition that included cardboard cutout figures featuring Loyd's cartoon illustrations of most of the characters mentioned in the songs.

When Parliament went on tour in support of Motor Booty Affair, Loyd designed costumes for members of the band based on the cartoon illustrations he had made for the album cover.

== Other works ==
In 1977, Loyd illustrated a comic book that was included in Parliament's Funkentelechy Vs. the Placebo Syndrome, portraying the epic battle between Sir Nose D’Voidoffunk and Starchild (see P-Funk mythology). In the cartoon, which echoes the lyrics to the songs on the album, Sir Nose, who is determined not to dance, is ultimately defeated when Starchild shines a Flash Light on him.

Loyd was also responsible for the artwork on Bootsy's Rubber Band's This Boot Is Made for Fonk-N and Parliament's Gloryhallastoopid (Or Pin the Tail on the Funky), both released in 1979.

Loyd was recognized by Billboard for "Best Use of Computer Graphics" for his 1982 video for George Clinton's "Atomic Dog."

Loyd was the featured caricaturist on the American television game show Win, Lose or Draw.

In November 2006, Loyd was the guest art director for two episodes of the animated television series Class of 3000 on Cartoon Network.

Loyd is African-American.
