= Live 1976–1993 =

Live album by Parliament-Funkadelic

Live album by Parliament-Funkadelic
- Released: April 25, 1996
- Recorded: 1976–1993
- Genre: Funk, soul
- Label: Sequel Records

Parliament-Funkadelic chronology
T.A.P.O.A.F.O.M. (1996)	Live 1976–1993 (1996)	How Late Do U Have 2BB4UR Absent? (2005)

Live 1976–1993 is a four-disc live album of music by Parliament-Funkadelic and George Clinton recorded between 1976 and 1993. Footage of the 1976 concert was released on the George Clinton: The Mothership Connection DVD in 1998. This material has been issued in different configurations in different markets. The track listing below is for the European version, which is the most complete.

== Track listing ==
=== Disc 1 ===
1. Let's Take It to the Stage (San Diego Sports Arena, San Diego, CA, January 1977)
2. Do That Stuff (San Diego Sports Arena, San Diego, CA, January 1977)
3. Undisco Kidd (San Diego Sports Arena, San Diego, CA, January 1977)
4. Children of Production (Oakland Coliseum, Oakland, CA, January 1977)
5. Into You (Howard Theatre, Washington, DC, 2 November 1978)
6. Give Up the Funk – Bouncing Baby Bernie – Rap Brown – M.W.F.U. (Howard Theatre, Washington, DC, 2 November 1978)
7. Belchin' Bernie – Goody Goody – Maggot Brain (Howard Theatre, Washington, DC, 2 November 1978)
8. Comin' Round the Mountain (Denver, CO, 1976)
9. Red Hot Mama

=== Disc 2 ===
1. Are You Ready to Party – Funkentelechy (Hampton Coliseum, Hampton, VA, 3 June 1978)
2. Bop Gun – Is There a Doctor in the House? (Hampton Coliseum, Hampton, VA, 3 June 1978)
3. It Aint Illegal Yet (Hampton Coliseum, Hampton, VA, 3 June 1978)
4. Cosmic Slop (Hampton Coliseum, Hampton, VA, 3 June 1978)
5. Funk Gettin' Ready to Roll – I Got a Thing – Bassoline (Howard Theatre, Washington, DC, 1 November 1978)
6. Standing on the Verge – House on Fire – Tye Me Down (Howard Theatre, Washington, DC, 1 November 1978)
7. Electric Spanking (Of War Babies) (Hara Arena, Dayton, OH, 1981)

=== Disc 3 ===
1. One Nation Under a Groove – Horn Pone (Hara Arena, Dayton, OH, 1981)
2. Atomic Dog (Beverly Theatre, Los Angeles, CA, 1983)
3. The Mothership Connection – Trumpet Mayo Naise (Monroe Civic Center, Monroe, LA, 15 April 1978)
4. Flash Light (Monroe Civic Center, Monroe, LA, 15 April 1978)
5. Won't You Dance (Tokyo, Japan, 5–8 August 1993)
6. Quickie (Tokyo, Japan, 5–8 August 1993)
7. Aquaboogie – Under Water (Tokyo, Japan, 5–8 August 1993)
8. I Wanna Know If Its Good to You Baby (Tokyo, Japan, 5–8 August 1993)
9. Let's Go to Japan – Up for the Down Stroke (Tokyo, Japan, 5–8 August 1993)
10. Hit It or Quit It (Tokyo, Japan, 5–8 August 1993)
11. Gamin' on Ya (Tokyo, Japan, 5–8 August 1993)
12. Put Your Hands Together (Tokyo, Japan, 5–8 August 1993)

=== Disc 4 ===
1. Whatcha Gonna Do George – P-Funk (Wants to Funk You Up) (Chicago, IL, 1993)
2. You Do Me (Chicago, IL, 1993)
3. Nickel Bag Of Solos (Chicago, IL, 1993)
4. I Call My Baby Pussy (Chicago, IL, 1993)
5. Babblin' Kabbabie (Kawasaki Citta, Tokyo, Japan, 5 August 1993)
6. Dog You Out (Memphis, TN, 1993)
7. Yank My Doodles – Sum Else (Memphis, TN, 1993)
8. I Call My Baby Pussy (Sugar Shack, Boston, MA, 1972)
9. All Your Goodies Are Gone (Sugar Shack, Boston, MA, 1972)
10. I'll Bet You (Sugar Shack, Boston, MA, 1972)
11. No Head, No Backstage Pass (Chicago, IL, 1993)
12. Lifted (Los Angeles, CA, 1983)
