= Common Law Wife =

"Common Law Wife" is a song written by George Clinton and performed by the funk band Parliament. Recorded in 1972, it was released as a bonus track on the 2003 reissue of the album Chocolate City. The song's lyrics discuss a relationship recognised by the state but not officiated by a religious order.

The context of the album is discussion of life and politics in Washington D.C., United States.

"Common Law Wife" was also recorded by a female artist named Flo. Her version is featured on the George Clinton Family Series CD Plush Funk, which was released in 1992.
