= Chocolate City speech =

2006 speech by New Orleans mayor Ray Nagin

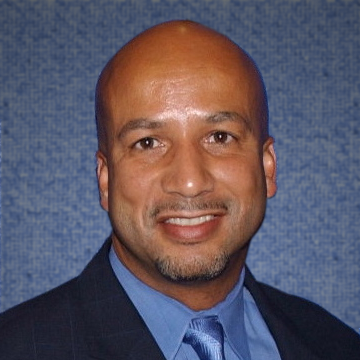
C. Ray Nagin, Jr. 2006 photo

The Chocolate City speech is the nickname that some people have given to the Martin Luther King Jr. Day speech by Ray Nagin, Mayor of New Orleans, Louisiana, on January 16, 2006. The speech concerned race politics in New Orleans several months after Hurricane Katrina destroyed much of the city. The reference is to the occurrence of the phrase chocolate city in Nagin's speech, which was one of several points in the speech that occasioned significant controversy and raised accusations of racism against Nagin.

== History of the phrase ==
In African American culture, the term chocolate city refers to a city with a predominantly African American population and/or African American political leadership. The concept originated with radio DJs in Washington D.C. in the early 1970s, and was popularized by the band Parliament, who released the album Chocolate City in 1975. The term has been used by scholar Cornel West in his 1993 book Race Matters and by comedian Chris Rock.

In an interview with Public Radio International's Tavis Smiley (originally broadcast on January 13, 2006) Nagin used the phrase "chocolate city" in reference to New Orleans' future demographics, a term that would become troublesome for him just a few days later.

== Context ==
See also Effects of Hurricane Katrina in New Orleans

At the end of August, 2005, New Orleans had been hit by Hurricane Katrina, and catastrophic failures of the city's Federal levees flooded the majority of the city. Only a small portion of the city's evacuated population had returned by January. Some commentators were suggesting that the city's demographics would change from majority African American to majority Caucasian.

This speech put the post-Hurricane Katrina recovery process of New Orleans in the context of the civil rights movement of the 1950s and 1960s. Nagin's speech reflected on the problems of violence and crime in pre- and post-Katrina New Orleans. He also referred to the humanitarian plight of the largely African-American hurricane victims in the Louisiana Superdome and Morial Convention Center.

== The speech ==
At a Martin Luther King Jr. Day celebration at City Hall New Orleans on January 16, 2006, the mayor gave a speech.

Nagin began the speech invoking spirits of Peace, Love, and Unity. He then described a talk he had with Martin Luther King Jr. earlier that morning (as King was long dead, this was presumably a metaphor or rhetorical device). Nagin then described some of the problems and suffering New Orleans had been experiencing since the hurricane, with the repeated refrain that Dr. King says "I wouldn't like that".

Shortly after, Nagin continued, "We as black people, it's time, it's time for us to come together. It's time for us to rebuild a New Orleans, the one that should be a chocolate New Orleans. And I don't care what people are saying Uptown or wherever they are. This city will be chocolate at the end of the day."

Nagin also stated that New Orleans "will be a majority African-American city. It's the way God wants it to be." As most New Orleanians knew the city had been majority African American for decades before Katrina, Ned Sublette of The Nation found the implication of Nagin claiming to know God's will more troubling than the suggested return of pre-Katrina demographics.

In the same speech, Nagin further stirred controversy by claiming that "God is mad at America. He sent us hurricane after hurricane after hurricane, and it's destroyed and put stress on this country....Surely he doesn't approve of us being in Iraq under false pretenses. But surely he is upset at black America also. We're not taking care of ourselves." Nagin then went on to relate an imagined conversation with the deceased Rev. Martin Luther King Jr. regarding both the response to Katrina and the modern problems of black America which he believes offended God.

== Reaction ==
The speech generated an intense reaction, much of it negative. The "Chocolate City" metaphor was seized on and parodied by commentators, and cartoons depicting Nagin as Willy Wonka appeared in print and on the internet. A Times-Picayune commentator suggested that Nagin had just ruined his own chances at re-election.

Political commentators pointed out that while this might just have been another example of Nagin speaking off the cuff, it would likely hurt his standing among white voters.

Many people believed the word uptown to be a coded reference to wealthy whites, such as those who lived in the old mansions on St. Charles Avenue or around Audubon Park. However, Uptown New Orleans was actually one of the most ethnically and economically diverse sections of the Metro area. Many of Nagin's original supporters lived in Uptown. As Uptown contained the largest section of unflooded high ground in the city's East Bank at the time of the speech, Uptown had the city's largest concentration of locals back in their homes, businesses back open, and displaced New Orleanians from other more severely damaged parts of town living there. Locals protested the Mayor's comment, which some felt suggested he did not care about an important section of his city.

Nagin later attempted to explain away his remarks by offering a more racially inclusive metaphor, saying "How do you make chocolate? You take dark chocolate, you mix it with white milk and it becomes a delicious drink. That's the chocolate I'm talking about."

Nagin said that his remarks were meant to be a call for African Americans to once again return to New Orleans, despite the supposed belief that many of the people in Uptown did not want them back.

The Mayor apologized for the suggestion that people in Uptown were racist, noting the importance of that section of town in the city's recovery. He particularly stated regret for the statements about God. "I don't know what happened there," he said. "I don't know how that got jumbled up. That whole God thing, I don't know how that got mixed up in there." Nagin concluded, "I need to be more aware and sensitive of what I'm saying... Anyone I've offended, I hope you forgive me."

In his speech at the 2006 White House Correspondents' Association Dinner, comedian Stephen Colbert mocked Nagin by calling Washington D.C. the "chocolate city with a marshmallow center and a graham cracker crust of corruption."

== See also ==
- Rhetorical device
