= (I Wanna) Testify =

Single by The Parliaments
- A-side: "(I Wanna) Testify"
- B-side: "I Can Feel The Ice Melting"
- Released: 1967
- Genre: Soul, R&B
- Length: 2:50
- Label: Revilot Records; RV 207
- Songwriters: George Clinton; Daron Taylor
- Producers: George Clinton; Arranged by Mike Terry

The Parliaments singles chronology
| "Heart Trouble" (1966) | "(I Wanna) Testify" (1967) | "All Your Goodies Are Gone" (1967) |

"(I Wanna) Testify" is the first hit single by the soul singing group The Parliaments.

== Background ==
The single was released at the beginning of the summer of 1967 by Revilot Records. It would be the only major hit for the group for the entire decade. The only member of the Parliaments to actually appear on the recording was group leader George Clinton, as the group was based in New Jersey at the time and only Clinton was able to travel to Detroit for the session. The recording was rounded off by session singers and musicians.

"(I Wanna) Testify" was reissued in 1969 on the Soultown label (Soultown 502-A). It was issued in Canada on the Transworld label (TW-1677) and on the Track label (Track 604032) in the UK. The first time that the single appeared on an album was the Track Records release Backtrack 6 in 1970 (Track 2407 006).

Group leader George Clinton later produced covers of both "(I Wanna) Testify" and its B-side "I Can Feel The Ice Melting". The former appeared on the 1974 Parliament album Up For The Down Stroke under the abbreviated title "Testify". Both "(I Wanna) Testify" and "I Can Feel The Ice Melting" were re-done by Otis Day and the Knights in 1989 (produced by George Clinton). Another P-Funk spin-off act, the Brides Of Funkenstein recorded a version of "I Can Feel The Ice Melting" in 1978, but the track wasn't released until the 1993 archival release "A Fifth Of Funk". That recording was produced by P-Funk production assistant Ron Dunbar.

== Chart performance ==
The single went to #3 on Billboard R&B chart, #20 on the Pop chart, and #23 in Canada .

== Cover versions ==
- Pacific Ocean recorded a version which was the B side to their single, "I Can't Stand It, released in 1968.
- Johnnie Taylor remade "(I Wanna Testify)" for his 1969 The Johnnie Taylor Philosophy Continues album - a Don Davis production - from which it was issued as the lead single in April 1969: Taylor's version rose as high as #4 R&B and crossed over to the Pop Top 40 at #36, and #35 in Canada.
- George Clinton produced a 1978 remake of "(I Wanna) Testify" by the Dells: the track was released as a single from the album New Beginnings but failed to chart.
- In 2011, Jon Stevens recorded and released a version of the song as the lead single from his eighth studio album, Testify!.

== Other cover versions ==
- "(I Wanna) Testify" has also been covered by Roger Taylor, Noel Paul Stookey and Ronnie Wood.
