= Medicaid Fraud Dogg =

Studio album by Parliament
- Released: May 22, 2018
- Recorded: 2017–2018
- Genre: Funk; hip hop; R&B
- Length: 107:24
- Label: C Kunspyruhzy
- Producer: George Clinton (exec.)

Parliament chronology
The Casablanca Years: 1974–1980 (2007)	Medicaid Fraud Dogg (2018)

Medicaid Fraud Dogg is the tenth and final studio album by American band Parliament, led by George Clinton. It was released on May 22, 2018, under the record label Clinton founded in 2003, C Kunspyruhzy Records. Guest musicians on the album include Fred Wesley and Pee Wee Ellis, one-time James Brown collaborators. It features guest appearances from Scarface and Mudbone. Medicaid Fraud Dogg was released in Japan by P-Vine records on September 12, 2018.

== Background ==
The album followed a 38-year dry spell since the release of the band's last studio album, Trombipulation. Most of the 23 tracks on the album were written by Clinton in collaboration with his son, Tracey Lewis.

== Critical reception ==
Professional ratings
Review scores
Source	Rating
Exclaim!	7/10
Pitchfork	7.3/10

Sheldon Pearce of Pitchfork praised the album, saying, "On the album, Clinton not only traces his band’s impact through the generations of music it influenced but suggests it still has the power to influence people today. At its best, most enthusiastic, and most optimistic, Medicaid Fraud Dogg proposes that funk is the panacea."

Matt Bauer of Exclaim! also claimed, "It's been 38 years, but the timing couldn't have been better for a new Parliament album...Medicaid Fraud Dogg sees a revitalized George Clinton and the funk mob targeting pharmaceutical conglomerates, social media and police brutality over its 23 tracks, all while rocking that off-kilter P-Funk magic."

Lars Gotrich of NPR favorably commented, "The only antidote for the hell-in-a-handbasket blues is the stankiest of funks, and no one makes it stankier than George Clinton."

== Track listing ==
CD 1
No.	Title	Writer(s)	Length
1.	"Medicated Creep"	Tracey Lewis-Clinton; George Clinton; Walter Morrison	3:25
2.	"Psychotropic"	Tracey Lewis; George Clinton	4:27
3.	"69"	George Clinton; Ivan Gonzalez; D'Metrius Hollis; Danny Bedrosian	4:20
4.	"Backwoods"	Tracey Lewis-Clinton; George Clinton	6:11
5.	"Oil Jones"	George Clinton; DeWayne McKnight; Tracey Lewis; Pricilla Ben	5:50
6.	"Proof Is in the Pudding"	George Clinton; Tracey Lewis-Clinton	5:20
7.	"I'm Gon Make U Sick O'me (feat. Scarface & Mudbone)"	George Clinton; Walter Morrison; Brad Jordan	5:22
8.	"Antisocial Media"	George Clinton; D'Metrius Hollis	3:31
9.	"All In"	George Clinton; D'Metrius Hollis; Ebony Houston	4:20
10.	"On Fire"	George Clinton; D'Metrius Hollis	5:06
11.	"Loodie Poo Da Pimp"	Tracey Lewis; George Clinton	4:31
12.	"Mama Told Me"	Bouvier Richardson; George Clinton	3:21
13.	"Set Trip"	Tracey Lewis; George Clinton; DeWayne McKnight	3:43
14.	"Kool Aid"	George Clinton; Tracey Lewis-Clinton; T. Jones; T. Draper	3:11
Total length:			62:45

CD 2
No.	Title	Writer(s)	Length
15.	"DaDa"	Tracey Lewis; George Clinton	5:39
16.	"Pain Management"	George Clinton; Rob Mandell; Brandi Scott; Carlon Clinton; Tracey Lewis	5:26
17.	"Riddle Me This"	Tracey Lewis; George Clinton; Rob Manzoli	4:08
18.	"No Mos"	George Clinton; DeWayne McKnight; Bouvier Richardson; Brandi Scott	7:10
19.	"Ya Habit"	Tracey Lewis; George Clinton	4:25
20.	"Higher"	Kendra Foster; George Clinton; D'Metrius Hollis; Gary Cooper	5:42
21.	"Medicaid Fraud Dogg"	George Clinton; Rob Mandell; Brandi Scott; Ebony Houston	3:42
22.	"Insurance Man"	George Clinton; Bernie Worrell; William "Bootsy" Collins; Tracey Lewis-Clinton; Bethany Schmit	3:22
23.	"Type Two"	George Clinton; Danny Bedrosian	4:44
Total length:			44:39
