= Fantasy Is Reality =

1977 single from Parliament

Single by Parliament

from the album Live: P-Funk Earth Tour
- B-side: "The Landing (Of the Holy Mothership)"
- Released: 1977
- Genre: Funk/R&B
- Length: 6:40 (album version)
- Label: Casablanca NB 892
- Songwriter(s): George Clinton/Bernie Worrell/Leon Ware
- Producer(s): George Clinton

"Fantasy Is Reality" is a 1977 song recorded by the funk band Parliament. It was the only single released from the album Live: P-Funk Earth Tour. The song was originally recorded during Parliament's period at Invictus Records. Unlike the bulk of Live: P-Funk Earth Tour, "Fantasy Is Reality" was recorded in the studio, as was its B-side, "The Landing (Of the Holy Mothership)".

"Fantasy Is Reality" was cut from the album's 1991 CD reissue, but was included on the Parliament compilation album Tear the Roof Off 1974-1980. A version is also featured as a bonus track on the CD reissue of Osmium. It reached number 54 in the U.S. on Billboard's Hot Soul Singles chart.

The midtempo track has been called a "churchy funk ballad".

== Chart performance ==
Chart performance for "Fantasy Is Reality"
| Chart (1977) | Peak position |
|---|---|
| US Hot R&B/Hip-Hop Songs (Billboard) | 54 |
