= Party People (Parliament song) =

Single by Parliament

from the album Gloryhallastoopid
- A-side: "Party People"
- B-side: "Party People (Reprise)"
- Released: 1979
- Genre: Disco
- Length: 10:08
- Label: Casablanca; NB 2222
- Songwriter(s): George Clinton; Bootsy Collins; Garry Shider
- Producer(s): George Clinton

"Party People" is a song by the band Parliament from their 1979 album Gloryhallastoopid. Over ten minutes long, it was released as both a two-part 7" single and a 12" record. It reached No. 39 on the Billboard R&B chart. Stylistically, "Party People" is in more of a disco vein than the funk songs for which Parliament is best known. According to music writer Rickey Vincent, it was the band's "self-admitted worst record ever."
