= Trombipulation =

Studio album by Parliament
- Released: December 1980
- Recorded: 1979–1980
- Studios: Concorde Studios, Los Angeles, California; Power Station, New York; Superdisc Inc., East Detroit, Michigan; United Sound Systems, Detroit, Michigan
- Genre: Funk
- Length: 43:20
- Label: Casablanca
- Producers: George Clinton, Bootsy Collins, Ron Dunbar, Ron Ford

Parliament chronology
Gloryhallastoopid (Or Pin the Tail on the Funky) (1979)	Trombipulation (1980)	Parliament's Greatest Hits (1984)

Trombipulation is the ninth album by the funk band Parliament. It was released by Casablanca Records. It was the last album of original material produced by the group for 38 years, until Medicaid Fraud Dogg in 2018. Unlike previous Parliament albums, George Clinton did not serve as sole producer of the album, as other P-Funk figures assisted in producing individual tracks. Bassist Bootsy Collins emerged as the principal musician on this album, playing virtually all of the instruments on a number of tracks. The track "Let's Play House" was sampled by the hip-hop group Digital Underground for their single "The Humpty Dance".

While Trombipulation wasn't as commercially successful as previous Parliament albums, its first single, "Agony of DeFeet" peaked at number 7 on the Billboard Hot R&B/Hip-Hop Songs charts.

== Critical reception ==
Professional ratings
Review scores
Source	Rating
AllMusic	2/5 stars
Robert Christgau	B−

The New York Times wrote that "this is street music, laced with jive talk, as alive with sound and color as a busy Manhattan street corner during rush hour... It is frequently ingenious, but it's never very compelling emotionally."

== Track listing ==
No.	Title	Writer(s)	Length
1.	"Crush It" ((released as single Casablanca NB 2330, then as a 12" single-Casablanca NB 20235))	Bootsy Collins, David Spradley	3:50
2.	"Trombipulation"	Collins, George Clinton	4:33
3.	"Long Way Around"	B. Bishop, Ron Ford, Bernie Worrell, Robert Johnson	5:41
4.	"Agony of Defeet" ((released as single Casablanca NB 2317, then as a promotional 12" single-Casablanca NBD 20232))	Ron Dunbar, Donnie Sterling, G. Clinton	6:00
5.	"New Doo Review"	S. Green, Ford, Garry Shider, Johnson, Lige Curry	5:53
6.	"Let's Play House"	Walter Morrison, L. Clinton, Collins	3:39
7.	"Body Language" ((released as the b-side to "Crush It"))	Sterling, G. Clinton, Johnson	5:56
8.	"Peek-a-Groove"	Ford, Jerome Ali, Johnson, D. Clinton	7:48
Total length:			43:20

== Personnel ==
- Bass: Bootsy Collins, Donnie Sterling, Lige Curry, Jimmie Ali
- Guitars: Bootsy Collins, Tony Thomas, Michael Hampton, Gordon Carlton, Jerome Ali
- Drums: Bootsy Collins, Lonnie Greene, Tyrone Lampkin, Kenny Colton
- Keyboards: Bernie Worrell, David Lee Chong, Michael Hampton, Manon Saulsby, Ernestro Wilson
- Horns: Fred Wesley, Larry Hatcher, Bennie Cowan, Greg Thomas, Maceo Parker, Richard Griffith, Darryl Dixon, David Taylor, Barry Taylor, Barry Rogers, Danny Cahn, David Tofani, John Mical, David Majali, Randy Brecker, Michael Brecker
- Vocals: Dr. Funk, Garry Shider, Ray Davis, Michael "Clip" Payne, Lige Curry, Jerome Rodgers, Larry Hatcher, Robert Johnson, Ron Dunbar, Jeanette McGruder, Dawn Silva, Sheila Horne, Mallia Franklin, Shirley Hayden, Janice Evans, Jeanette Washington, Gwen Dozier, Cheryl James, Ron Ford, Patty Walker, Andre Williams, Stevie Pannell, Kevin Shider, Tracey "Trey Lewd" Lewis, Tony Davis, Philippe Wynne, Jessica Cleaves, Donnie Sterling, Tony Thomas, Lonnie Greene, Nina Hoover, Linda Shider, Larry Heckstall, Dawn Driver, Ronni Faust, Godmoma, Junie Morrison, Bootsy Collins.
