= Testify (Parliament song) =

Single by Parliament

from the album Up for the Down Stroke
- B-side: "I Can Move You"
- Released: November 1974
- Genre: R&B/Funk
- Length: 3:45
- Label: Casablanca 811
- Songwriter(s): George Clinton/Daron Taylor
- Producer(s): George Clinton

"Testify" is a song by the band Parliament. It is a funk reworking of the song "(I Wanna) Testify", which was originally recorded in 1967 by The Parliaments and reached #3 on the Billboard R&B chart. This new version was the second single released from the 1974 album Up for the Down Stroke, and the second track on the album.

This version included a clavinet track by keyboardist Bernie Worrell and vocals by guitarist Eddie Hazel.

== Original mix ==
The version of "Testify" included on early pressings of Up for the Down Stroke featured a mix that highlighted the group vocals and deemphasized the instrumental sound. On later pressings this was replaced by a version with different, more rhythm-intensive mix – the version heard on the song's single release. The original mix of the song was included as a bonus track on the 2003 CD reissue of the album.

The version of this song on the original album release also deleted a small portion of the clavinet introduction. This was restored on the 1993 compilation release Tear the Roof Off 1974–1980.
