= Funkentelechy vs. the Placebo Syndrome =

Studio album by Parliament
- Released: November 28, 1977
- Recorded: 1976–1977
- Studios: United Sound Systems, Detroit, Michigan, and Hollywood Sound, Hollywood, California
- Genres: Funk, disco
- Length: 44:00
- Label: Casablanca
- Producer: George Clinton

Parliament chronology
Live: P-Funk Earth Tour (1977)	Funkentelechy vs. the Placebo Syndrome (1977)	Motor Booty Affair (1978)

Singles from Funkentelechy vs. the Placebo Syndrome
- 1. "Bop Gun (Endangered Species)" Released: October 29, 1977; 2. "Flash Light" Released: January 28, 1978; 3. "Funkentelechy" Released: June 3, 1978

Funkentelechy vs. the Placebo Syndrome is the sixth studio album by the American funk band Parliament, released on November 28, 1977, on Casablanca Records.

Funkentelechy is a loose concept album set within the P-Funk mythology warning of the dangers of the "Placebo Syndrome", which according to bandleader George Clinton consists of consumerism and disco music, which he saw as a crass commercialized variant of funk. The album spawned the Billboard R&B charts number 1 single "Flash Light", which features a prominent synthesizer bass line played on a Minimoog by keyboardist Bernie Worrell. The album became Parliament's fourth consecutive gold album and second platinum album certified by the Recording Industry Association of America. The song "Sir Nose d'Voidoffunk (Pay Attention – B3M)" quotes the nursery rhymes "Baa, Baa, Black Sheep" and "Three Blind Mice", with lyrics altered to refer to drug use.

The original vinyl release contained a 22″×33″ poster of the character Sir Nose D'Voidoffunk, as well as an 8-page comic book that explains the album's concept. Both the poster and the comic book were illustrated by Overton Loyd.

== Reception and legacy ==
Professional ratings
Review scores
Source	Rating
AllMusic	5/5 stars
Christgau's Record Guide	A
Rolling Stone	4/5 stars
(The New) Rolling Stone Album Guide	4.5/5 stars
Spin Alternative Record Guide	9/10
The Virgin Encyclopedia of R&B and Soul	4/5 stars

The Globe and Mail praised the "superb" backing vocals of the Brides of Funkenstein. The New York Times wrote that "the music is typical P-Funk bouncing disco, lively and toe-tapping, with gabbling spoken and sung vocals on top."

American alternative rock band Urge Overkill named themselves after a lyric in "Funkentelechy".

== Track listing ==
No.	Title	Writer(s)	Length
1.	"Bop Gun (Endangered Species)" (released as a single, Casablanca NB 900)	George Clinton, Garry Shider, Bootsy Collins	8:31
2.	"Sir Nose d'Voidoffunk (Pay Attention – B3M)"	Clinton, Collins, Bernie Worrell	10:04
3.	"Wizard of Finance"	Clinton, Ronald Ford, Glenn Goins	4:23
4.	"Funkentelechy" (released as a single-Casablanca NB 921)	Clinton, Collins	10:56
5.	"Placebo Syndrome"	Clinton, Billy Nelson	4:20
6.	"Flash Light" (released as a single, Casablanca NB 909, and as a promo-only 12″ single, Casablanca NB 20113 DJ)	Clinton, Collins, Worrell	5:46
Total length:			44:00

== Personnel ==
- Vocals – George Clinton, Ray Davis, Glenn Goins, Garry Shider, Debbie Wright, Jeanette Washington, Lynn Mabry, Dawn Silva, Cordell Mosson, Mallia Franklin (not included on liner notes)
- Keyboards and synthesizers – Bernie Worrell (Keyboard bass on "Flash Light")
- Guitars – Michael Hampton, Glenn Goins, Garry Shider; Phelps Collins on "Flash Light"
- Bass guitar – Cordell Mosson, Bootsy Collins
- Drums and percussion – Jerome Brailey; Bootsy Collins on "Flash Light"
- Horns – Fred Wesley, Maceo Parker, Rick Gardner, Richard Griffith, Clay Lawrey, Darryl Dixon, Valerie Drayton, Danny Cortez
- Extra-extra terrestrial funk bearing alumni-Strokers, Chokers, Clappers and Chanters – Bootsy Collins, Phelps Collins, Frank Waddy, Rick Gilmore, Gary Cooper, Robert Johnson, Billy Nelson, Ron Ford, Lou Goldman, Joel Johnson, Bootsy's Rubber Band, the Brides of Funkenstein, Parlet and the Horny Horns.

According to George Clinton, Mallia Franklin also sang on this album with other original Parlet members Debbie Wright and Jeanette Washington but she is not listed on the album's credits.

Horn arrangement by Bernie Worrell and Fred Wesley

Production

- Produced by George Clinton
- Engineered by Jim Vitti
- Mixing assistance by Bernie Worrell
- Mastered by Allen Zentz
- Photography by Ron Slenzak
- Album graphics by Stephen Lumel/Gribbitt!
- Booklet story and illustrated by Overton Loyd
- Booklet coloring and collaboration by Shelby Mack

== Charts ==
=== Weekly charts ===
Chart (1977–1978)	Peak position
US Top R&B/Hip-Hop Albums (Billboard)	2
US Billboard 200	13

== Certifications ==
Region	Certification	Certified units/sales
United States (RIAA)	Platinum	1,000,000^{^}
^{^} Shipments figures based on certification alone.
