= Osmium (album) =

Studio album by Parliament
- Released: July 1970
- Recorded: 1969–1970
- Genre: Psychedelic soul
- Length: 45:53
- Label: Invictus
- Producer: George Clinton, Ruth Copeland

Parliament chronology
Osmium (1970)	Up for the Down Stroke (1974)

Professional ratings
Review scores
Source	Rating
AllMusic	4/5 stars
Christgau's Record Guide	B
The New Rolling Stone Album Guide	3.5/5 stars

Osmium is the debut album of American funk band Parliament, led by George Clinton. The album has a psychedelic soul sound with a spirit of experimentation that is more similar to early Funkadelic than the later R&B-inspired Parliament albums. It was originally released in July 1970 on Invictus Records. The original vinyl release contained a glossy lyric sheet.

Since its re-release in 1990, Osmium has been distributed numerous times by various labels in the U.S., Europe and Japan, sometimes under alternate titles that have included Rhenium and First Thangs. A number of these reissues have featured material that was not included on the original album, such as unreleased tracks and singles that were recorded around the same time as Osmium.

The personnel for this album included the five Parliaments singers and the five backing musicians known as Funkadelic. The same personnel also recorded as Funkadelic, releasing that act's self-titled debut album also in 1970. After the release of Osmium, contractual difficulties prevented further recording under the name Parliament until 1974, when Clinton signed that act to Casablanca Records and positioned it as an R&B-inspired counterpoint to the more rock-oriented Funkadelic.

The yodeling that arguably uniquely identifies one of De La Soul's early hits, "Potholes in My Lawn" (which eventually appeared on De La Soul's 3 Feet High and Rising), comes from Osmium's "Little Ole Country Boy".

This is the only Parliament album to be produced by Ruth Copeland, and the only album to feature rhythm guitarist Tawl Ross, before his 1971 departure from the group.

== Track listing ==
Invictus – ST-7302

Side one
No.	Title	Writer(s)	Length
1.	"I Call My Baby Pussycat"	George Clinton, Eddie Hazel, Billy Nelson	3:50
2.	"Put Love in Your Life"	George Clinton, Vivian Lewis	5:05
3.	"Little Ole Country Boy"	Ruth Copeland	3:57
4.	"Moonshine Heather"	George Clinton	4:04
5.	"Oh Lord, Why Lord/Prayer"	Phil Trim, Ruth Copeland	4:59

Side two
No.	Title	Writer(s)	Length
1.	"My Automobile"	George Clinton, Clarence Haskins	4:43
2.	"Nothing Before Me but Thang"	George Clinton, Bobby Harris, Eddie Hazel, Bernie Worrell	3:55
3.	"Funky Woman"	George Clinton, Bernie Worrell	2:54
4.	"Livin' the Life"	George Clinton, Billy Nelson, Bernie Worrell	6:15
5.	"The Silent Boatman"	Ruth Copeland	5:50
Total length:			45:32

CD Reissue (Edsel Records – EDSS 1031)
No.	Title	Writer(s)	Length
11.	"Breakdown" (Mono Single Version)	George Clinton, Ruth Copeland, Clyde Wilson	2:30
12.	"Red Hot Mama"	George Clinton	4:26
13.	"Come in out of the Rain"	Ruth Copeland, Clyde Wilson	2:56
14.	"Loose Booty"		10:18
15.	"Fantasy Is Reality"	George Clinton, Bernie Worrell, Leon Ware	3:56
16.	"Unfinished Instrumental"		5:10
17.	"Breakdown" (Stereo Unedited Version)	George Clinton, Ruth Copeland, Clyde Wilson	3:50
Total length:			1:18:58

== Track listing for First Thangs ==
1. "Red Hot Mama"
2. "Come In Out of the Rain"
3. "Fantasy Is Reality"
4. "Breakdown"
5. "Loose Booty"
6. "Unfinished Instrumental"
7. "I Call My Baby Pussycat"
8. "Put Love in Your Life"
9. "Little Old Country Boy"
10. "Moonshine Heather (Takin' Care of Business)"
11. "Oh Lord, Why Lord/Prayer"
12. "My Automobile"
13. "There Is Nothing Before Me But Thang"
14. "Funky Woman"
15. "Livin' the Life"
16. "The Silent Boatmen"

== Track listing for Rhenium ==
1. "Breakdown"
2. "I Call My Baby Pussycat"
3. "Put Love in Your Life"
4. "Little Ole Country Boy"
5. "Moonshine Heather"
6. "Oh Lord, Why Lord/Prayer"
7. "Red Hot Mama"
8. "My Automobile"
9. "Nothing Before Me But Thang"
10. "Funky Woman"
11. "Livin' the Life"
12. "Come in Out of the Rain"
13. "The Silent Boatman"

== Personnel ==
- George Clinton - lead vocals in "Loose Booty", "Moonshine Heather", "Red Hot Mama", "My Automobile", "Funky Woman"
- Fuzzy Haskins - lead vocals in "Fantasy Is Reality", "I Call My Baby Pussycat", "Little Old Country Boy", "My Automobile"
- Calvin Simon - lead vocals in "I Call My Baby Pussycat", "Oh Lord Why Lord", "Livin' the Life"
- Ray Davis - lead vocals in "I Call My Baby Pussycat", "Put Love in Your Life"
- Grady Thomas - lead vocals in "I Call My Baby Pussycat"
- Clyde Darnell Wilson - lead vocals in "Come in Out of the Rain", "Breakdown"
- Ruth Copeland - vocals
- Eddie Hazel - guitar
- Tawl Ross - guitar
- Billy Bass Nelson - bass guitar
- Bernie Worrell - Hammond organ, piano
- Tiki Fulwood - drums
- Paul Franklin - pedal steel on "Little Ole Country Boy"

Note: Personnel as listed in the album credits. Note that some songs also featured session personnel. Garry Shider (guitar), Bernie Worrell (keyboards), and Tyrone Lampkin (drums) also appeared on some non-album tracks that were included in later CD reissues of the album. Red Hot Mama, Loose Booty, I Call My Baby Pussycat, and Fantasy Is Reality would all be remade on later Parliament-Funkadelic albums.
