= Gloryhallastoopid =

Gloryhallastoopid (Or Pin the Tale on the Funky)

Studio album by Parliament
- Released: 1979
- Studios: United, Detroit, Michigan
- Genre: Funk
- Length: 45:22
- Label: Casablanca
- Producer: George Clinton

Parliament chronology
Motor Booty Affair (1978)	Gloryhallastoopid (Or Pin the Tale on the Funky) (1979)	Trombipulation (1980)

Gloryhallastoopid (Or Pin the Tale on the Funky) is the eighth album by the American funk band Parliament, released in 1979. It was their penultimate album on the Casablanca Records label and is another concept album that tries to explain that funk was responsible for the creation of the universe (see P-Funk mythology). It reuses samples from previous albums, notably Mothership Connection and Funkentelechy vs. the Placebo Syndrome.

== Critical reception ==
Professional ratings
Review scores
Source	Rating
AllMusic	3/5 stars
Bay State Banner	A−
Christgau's Record Guide	B+
MusicHound Rock: The Essential Album Guide	3.5/5 stars
Record Mirror	4/5 stars
The Rolling Stone Album Guide	3/5 stars
Spin Alternative Record Guide	5/10
Tom Hull – on the Web	B+
The Virgin Encyclopedia of R&B and Soul	3/5 stars

The Bay State Banner wrote that, "however subtle Parliament has become, we continue to get low-register bass riffs, synthesizer horror riffs, disco tempos, and double-entendre lyrics pairing the nature of the cosmos with the behavior of the sex drive." The Oakland Tribune called the album "a gem of cosmic Uncle Tomfoolery" and considered it to be better than Uncle Jam Wants You. The Buffalo News determined that much of the "funky power is lost," but praised "Theme from the Black Hole". Newsday opined that "Party People" "catches George Clinton reaching too hard for a pop hit."

== Track listing ==
1. "Prologue" – 0:47
2. "(Gloryhallastoopid) Pin the Tale on the Funky" (Bootsy Collins, George Clinton) – 4:06
3. "Party People" (B. Collins, Clinton, Garry Shider) – 10:08 (released as a 4:46 single-Casablanca NB 2222)
4. "The Big Bang Theory" (Donnie Sterling, Ron Dunbar, Clinton) – 7:10 (released as a single-Casablanca NB 2250)
5. "The Freeze (Sizzaleenmean)" (DeWayne McKnight, Clinton) – 8:59
6. "Colour Me Funky" (J.S. Theracon, Clinton) – 4:51
7. "Theme from the Black Hole" (B. Collins, Clinton, Theracon) – 4:38 (released as a single-Casablanca NB 2235 and as a 12" single with "The Big Bang Theory"-Casablanca NB 20208)
8. "May We Bang You?" (Clinton, B. Collins, Phelps Collins, Theracon) – 4:43

== Personnel ==
The Odd Squad Musicians

- Totally Treacherous But Slightly Silly Axe Molestors (guitars): Michael Hampton, Garry Shider, William Collins, Phelps Collins, Gordon Carlton, DeWayne McKnight, Walter "Junie" Morrison
- Underneath Below Bottom and Other Deep Basic Activities (bass): Rodney Curtis, Donnie Sterling, William Collins, DeWayne McKnight, Walter Morrison
- Goofin' Gooey Quacy Quirkn' Glueon Key Bangers? (keyboards): Bernie Worrell, Walter Morrison, David Lee Chong
- African Telephone Operators (drums): Dennis Chambers, Kenny Colton, Tyrone Lampkin, William Collins, DeWayne McKnight
- Directory Assistance (percussion): Larry Fratangelo, Carl "Butch" Small
- Pieces of Mouf (Mouf Pieces) (horns): Greg Thomas, Greg Boyer, Bennie Cowens, Larry Hatcher, Maceo Parker, Sam Peakes
- Horn arrangements: Bernie Worrell, Fred Wesley, P-Funk Horns (The Baltimore Connection Horn Section), Sam Peakes

Scream Division

- The Put Yo' Boody Where Yo' Mouf Iz Choir: Ray Davis, Garry Shider, Ron Ford, Larry Heckstall, Michael "Clip" Payne, Tracey "Lewd" Lewis, Linda Shider, Dawn Silva, Sheila Horne, Jeanette Washington, Jeanette McGruder, Shirley Hayden, Janice Evans, Greg Thomas, Robert Johnson, Ron Dunbar, Jessica Cleaves, Philippe Wynne, Bootsy Collins, George Clinton, Gary Cooper, Joel Johnson, Wellington Wigout, Star Child
- Additional backing vocals: Jerome Rogers, Tony Davis, Andre Williams, Larry Hackett, Walter Morrison, Rod
