= Funkentelechy =

Single by Parliament

from the album Funkentelechy Vs. the Placebo Syndrome
- A-side: "Funkentelechy"
- B-side: "Funkentelechy" Pt. 2
- Released: 1978
- Genre: Funk
- Length: 10:56 (album version)
- Label: Casablanca 921
- Songwriter(s): George Clinton/Bootsy Collins
- Producer(s): George Clinton

"Funkentelechy" is a song by the funk band Parliament. It is the fourth track on the group's 1977 album Funkentelechy Vs. the Placebo Syndrome and was released as a two-part single in 1978. Part 1 peaked at number 27 on the U.S. R&B Singles chart. The song's title is a play on the philosophical concept of entelechy.

== Trivia ==
- The phrase "Urge Overkill" from George Clinton's radio announcer-style patter on the song later became the name of an alternative rock band.
- One of Clinton's quips during the song, "Like a woodpecker with a headache," resembles the mood indication on a piano piece by the eccentric composer Erik Satie: "Like a nightingale with a toothache."
- This song was sampled by Ice Cube for his song "Doing Dumb Shit" on his album Death Certificate.
- The repeated phrase "You deserve a break today - Have it your way" is a reference to McDonald's "You Deserve a Break Today" and Burger King's "Have it Your Way" ad campaigns of the time.
- The repeated references to "The Pleasure Principle" are a nod to Sigmund Freud's Pleasure Principle theory in psychology.

== Charts ==
=== Weekly charts ===
Chart (1978)	Peak position
US Hot R&B/Hip-Hop Songs (Billboard)	27
