= Chocolate City (album) =

Studio album by Parliament
- Released: April 8, 1975
- Genre: Funk
- Length: 36:42
- Label: Casablanca
- Producer: George Clinton

Parliament chronology
| Up for the Down Stroke (1974) | Chocolate City (1975) | Mothership Connection (1975) |

Professional ratings
Review scores
| Source | Rating |
|---|---|
| AllMusic | 4/5 stars |
| Blender | 5/5 stars |
| Christgau's Record Guide | B |
| Pitchfork Media | 7.8/10 |
| PopMatters | (favorable) |
| Rhapsody | (favorable) |
| Rolling Stone | 5/5 stars |

Chocolate City is the third album by the funk band Parliament, released in 1975. It was a "tribute to Washington D.C.", where the group had been particularly popular. The album's cover includes images of the United States Capitol, the Washington Monument, and the Lincoln Memorial in the form of a chocolate medallion, as well as a sticker labeled "Washington DC". The album was very popular in the capital city, selling 150,000 copies alone there.

== Music ==
Chocolate City features the classic P-Funk lineup with George Clinton, Bootsy Collins, Bernie Worrell, and Eddie Hazel. The Brecker Brothers, Michael and Randy, joined the band as did vocalist Glenn Goins. Prakash John plays bass on several tracks. This album also marks the beginning of the pivotal songwriting team of George Clinton, Bootsy Collins, and Bernie Worrell, a partnership that would last until the 1978 release Motor Booty Affair.

The album is full of the uptempo funk that the band would be known for as well as the vocal harmonies of The Parliaments. "Let Me Be" draws on jazz as well as gospel influences. "Together" is a remake of "Together in Heaven" by Bootsy, Phelps, and Gary. Glen Goins makes his debut P. Funk performance on "Big Footin'".

== Chart performance ==
Chocolate City reached number 18 on the Billboard soul LP charts in 1975 and reached No. 91 on the album charts. "Chocolate City", the title track and first single, reached No. 24 on the black chart and No. 94 on the Billboard Hot 100, while "Ride On", the second single, reached No. 64 on the black chart.

== "Chocolate City" theme ==
The album takes its name from the term "Chocolate City," which had been used to describe Washington, D.C., where blacks had been becoming a majority through migration (as explained in the cover notes included with one recent CD release of the album). The term had been used by Washington's black AM radio stations WOL-AM and WOOK-AM since the early 1970s to refer to the city. Bobby "The Mighty Burner" Bennett, a DJ on WOL, told The Washington Post in 1998, "Chocolate City for me was the expression of D.C.'s classy funk and confident blackness."

George Clinton used the concept in the title track, characterizing the black population's proliferation in American inner cities as a positive development, in contrast to concerns over white flight. The lyrics of the song refer to several such "chocolate cities" but focuses on D.C.: "There's a lot of chocolate cities around/We got Newark, we got Gary/Someone told me we got L.A./ And we're working on Atlanta / But you're the capital C.C." There is also a reference to Chocolate City's "vanilla suburbs", which he asks God to bless in-kind.

Clinton's lyrics referred to Chocolate City as "my piece of the rock" as opposed to the "40 acres and a mule" that slaves were promised after the Civil War.

The lyrics also reflected Clinton's thanks for the capital's strong support for P-Funk, further shown by the album cover showing the Lincoln Memorial and the United States Capitol, rendered in melting milk chocolate.

Other tracks on the album reflecting the influence of Washington, D.C., are "Let Me Be", drawing from 1970s D.C. gospel, and "I Misjudged You", a homage to the Unifics, a D.C. R&B ballad group.

== Track listing ==
Side one
| No. | Title | Writer(s) | Length |
|---|---|---|---|
| 1. | "Chocolate City" (released as a single-Casablanca 831) | George Clinton, Bootsy Collins, Bernie Worrell | 5:37 |
| 2. | "Ride On" (released as a single-Casablanca 843) | Clinton, Collins, Worrell | 3:34 |
| 3. | "Together" | Clinton, Collins, Worrell | 4:07 |
| 4. | "Side Effects" | Clinton, Collins, Ahneua Hilson | 3:13 |
| 5. | "What Comes Funky" | Clinton, Collins, Worrell | 2:23 |
| Total length: | | | 18:54 |

Side two
| No. | Title | Writer(s) | Length |
|---|---|---|---|
| 1. | "Let Me Be" | Clinton, Vivian Lewis | 5:37 |
| 2. | "If It Don't Fit (Don't Force It)" | Clinton, Garry Shider, Worrell | 2:07 |
| 3. | "I Misjudged You" | Clinton, Ernie Harris, Fuzzy Haskins | 5:14 |
| 4. | "Big Footin'" (released as the B-side to "Ride On") | Clinton, Haskins, Shider | 4:50 |
| Total length: | | | 17:48 36:42 |

A 2003 CD reissue of Chocolate City contained three bonus tracks, including alternate mixes of "If It Don't Fit (Don't Force It)" and "I Misjudged You" and the previously unreleased song "Common Law Wife".

== Personnel ==
- Jim Callon – Engineer
- George Clinton – Arrangements, vocals, production
- Bootsy Collins – Bass, guitar, arrangements, drums
- Raymond Davis – Vocals
- Ramon "Tiki" Fulwood – Drums
- Clarence "Fuzzy" Haskins – Vocals
- Eddie Hazel – Guitar, vocals (Lead Vocal on "Let Me Be")
- Prakash John – Bass
- Tyrone Lampkin – Drums
- Man In The Box – Drums
- Cordell Mosson – Bass, guitar
- Billy "Bass" Nelson – Bass
- Lucius Tawl Ross – Rhythm guitar
- Garry Shider – Rhythm guitar, vocals
- Calvin Simon – Vocals
- Grady Thomas – Vocals
- Jim Vitti – Engineer
- Bernie Worrell – Synthesizer, arrangements, keyboards
- Mallia Franklin – Vocals
- Debbie Wright – Vocals
- Jeanette Washington – Vocals
- Gary "Mudbone" Cooper – Vocals
