= Motor Booty Affair =

Studio album by Parliament
- Released: 1978
- Recorded: August 1977–July 1978
- Genre: Funk
- Length: 46:24
- Label: Casablanca
- Producer: George Clinton

Parliament chronology
Funkentelechy Vs. the Placebo Syndrome (1977)	Motor Booty Affair (1978)	Gloryhallastoopid (Or Pin the Tail on the Funky) (1979)

Motor Booty Affair is the seventh album by funk band Parliament, released in 1978. It contains two of the group's most popular tracks, "Rumpofsteelskin" and "Aqua Boogie (A Psychoalphadiscobetabioaquadoloop)", which went to number one on the Billboard Soul Singles chart.

The artist Overton Loyd created the art for Motor Booty Affair. The main release consisted of a gate-fold album cover featuring a pop-up rendition of the city of Atlantis, with Loyd's artwork on the front and back covers. His illustrations included cartoon portraits of some of the "characters" mentioned in the songs on the album, including "Mr. Wiggles". It also included cardboard cutout figures featuring Loyd's cartoon illustrations of most of the characters mentioned in the songs. There was a picture disk, with Loyd's illustration printed directly on the vinyl LP. The album was Parliament's fifth consecutive gold album (500,000 copies sold).

== Critical reception ==
Professional ratings
Review scores
Source	Rating
AllMusic	4.5/5 stars
Christgau's Record Guide	A−
(The New) Rolling Stone Album Guide	3.5/5 stars
The Virgin Encyclopedia of R&B and Soul	4/5 stars

The Bay State Banner wrote that the album "had bop and free jazz, bass playing of remarkable range and liberty, courageous and engaging piano, wisecracking but unpredictable vocals, lyrics that said it all in slang so right you felt you'd been using it all your life instead of hearing it for the first time."

== Track listing ==
No.	Title	Writer(s)	Length
1.	"Mr. Wiggles"	George Clinton; Bernie Worrell; Michael Hampton	6:46
2.	"Rumpofsteelskin" (released as a single-Casablanca NB 976)	Clinton; Bootsy Collins	5:37
3.	"(You're a Fish & I'm a) Water Sign" (released as the B-side to "Aqua Boogie")	Clinton; Garry Shider; J.S. Theracon; Richard Griffith	4:42
4.	"Aqua Boogie (A Psychoalphadiscobetabioaquadoloop)" (released as a single-Casablanca NB 950 and as a 12" single-Casablanca NBD 20147)	Clinton; Collins; Worrell	6:43
5.	"One of Those Funky Thangs"	Clinton; Ron Banks	3:46
6.	"Liquid Sunshine" (released as the B-side to "Rumpofsteelskin")	Linda Brown; Jim Vitti; Pete Bishop	4:25
7.	"The Motor-Booty Affair"	Clinton; Theracon; Ron Ford; Shider	5:16
8.	"Deep"	Collins; Theracon; Clinton	9:09
Total length:			46:24

== Personnel ==
Snorkel Singing Air Tank Harmonics:

- Jaws: George Clinton, Garry Shider, J.S. Theracon, Gary "Bone" Cooper, Ron Ford, Ray Davis, Bernie Worrell
- The Choral Reef (er, Bubbly Vocalizations): Debbie Wright, Jeanette Washington, Mallia Franklin, Shirley Hayden, Cheryl James, Lynn Mabry, Dawn Silva, Linda Brown, Richard "Kush" Griffith, Raymond Spruell, Mike "Clip" Payne, Joey Zalabok, Robert "P-Nut" Johnson, Larry Heckstall, Overton Loyd

Liquid Licks (Motor-Madness Musicians):

- Guitar: Michael Hampton, Garry Shider, J.S. Theracon, Phelps "Catfish" Collins, Bootsy Collins
- Bass: Cordell "Boogie" Mosson, Bootsy Collins, Rodney "Skeet" Curtis, J.S. Theracon
- Drums: Tyrone Lampkin, Bootsy Collins, Gary "Bone" Cooper, J.S. Theracon
- Percussion: Larry Fratangelo
- Horns: Fred Wesley, Richard "Kush" Griffith, Maceo Parker, Rick Gardner, Greg Boyer, Greg Thomas, Benny Cowan
- Keyboards/synthesizers: Bernie Worrell, J.S. Theracon
