= Up for the Down Stroke (song) =

Single by Parliament

from the album Up for the Down Stroke
- B-side: "Presence of a Brain"
- Released: June 1974
- Genre: Funk
- Length: 3:32 (Single version); 5:41 (Album version)
- Label: Casablanca NES 0104 and NB 803
- Songwriters: George Clinton; Bootsy Collins; Clarence "Fuzzy" Haskins; Bernie Worrell
- Producer: George Clinton

"Up for the Down Stroke" is a funk song by Parliament, the title track to their 1974 album of the same name. Released as a single from the album, it reached number ten on the Billboard R&B chart (the band's first top ten on the chart since Testify in 1967), and number 63 on the Hot 100. The song was one of the first compositions to feature the songwriting team of George Clinton, Bootsy Collins and Bernie Worrell (along with Fuzzy Haskins).

== Overview ==
"Up for the Down Stroke" was covered by Fred Wesley & The Horny Horns featuring Maceo Parker on the album A Blow for Me, a Toot for You.

== Use in other music and media ==
- In the Prince song, "Musicology", the phrase "get down for the up stroke", an inversion of the title, is used in the last section.
- The song appears in the 2000 film The Ladies Man, starring Tim Meadows.
