= Flash Light (song) =

1978 single by Parliament

- German picture sleeve for the single "Flash Light"

Single by Parliament

from the album Funkentelechy Vs. the Placebo Syndrome
- B-side: "Swing Down Sweet Chariot"
- Released: January 28, 1978
- Recorded: 1977
- Genre: Funk
- Length: 10:42 (extended 12" version); 5:46 (album version); 4:28 (single version)
- Label: Casablanca NB 909
- Songwriters: George Clinton; Bootsy Collins; Bernie Worrell
- Producer: George Clinton

Parliament singles chronology
"Bop Gun (Endangered Species)" (1977)	"Flash Light" (1978)	"Funkentelechy" (1978)

"Flash Light" (also called "Flashlight") is a song by American funk band Parliament, released on January 28, 1978, by Casablanca Records as the second single from their sixth album, Funkentelechy Vs. the Placebo Syndrome (1977). It is written by George Clinton, Bernie Worrell and Bootsy Collins, and is the final song on the album, finishing its story of the group’s quest to defeat the evil Sir Nose d'Voidoffunk, coercing him to dance. "Flash Light" was the first No. 1 R&B hit on the US Billboard chart by any of the P-Funk groups and also spent four months on the US pop chart, peaking at No. 16. The track became Parliament's second certified million-selling single, following "Give Up the Funk (Tear the Roof Off the Sucker)". It also gave Casablanca Records its first No. 1 R&B hit. In New Zealand, the song reached No. 3 and is ranked as the No. 8 hit of 1978. "Flash Light" also charted in Canada (No. 24) and reached No. 3 on WLS-AM in Chicago.

== Background ==
The song's distinctive bass line is often attributed to Bootsy Collins and was originally written for him. However, Collins rejected the part and Bernie Worrell created the line on at least three, possibly four connected Minimoog synthesizers. Worrell also played all the song's keyboard parts. The New York Times described Worrell's synthesized bass as a "descending and ascending chromatic line with a meaty tone and a certain swagger, an approach that would spread through funk, new wave, electro, synth-pop and countless other iterations."

Collins contributed to the track by handling drum duties while his elder brother Catfish Collins played rhythm guitar. Lead vocals were by bandleader Clinton. Clinton credited Worrell with the idea of composing the song under a motif. Starting out as a jam, Clinton recorded multiple tracks, layering up to 50 voices within the theme of an inclusive love song. The "Da da da dee da da da" chant was based on a Hebrew chant Clinton had heard in the 6th grade when a Jewish friend was preparing for his bar mitzvah.

== Impact and legacy ==
"Flash Light" continued the "Fake the Funk/Your nose will grow/Sir Nose D'Voidoffunk" concept that began with Bootsy's Rubber Band's "The Pinocchio Theory". Its success would greatly influence not only funk music, but also new wave and hip-hop. In 2013, the Houston Press ranked "Flash Light" as Clinton's most sampled song, finding more than 60 uses, including on Aaliyah's "Back and Forth" and UGK's "Protect and Serve". In 2010, it was rated No. 75 in Tablet's list of 100 Best Jewish Songs. Rolling Stone ranked "Flash Light" No. 202 on its 2011 list of the 500 Greatest Songs of All Time. In 2022, the magazine ranked it No. 25 in their list of the "200 Greatest Dance Songs of All Time". The song was sampled by Salt-N-Pepa in their 1986 hit "I'll Take Your Man", and in 2018 by the City Girls for their version of the song. Hip-hop group Digital Underground sampled the song for their hit "Doowutchyalike".

== In popular culture ==
Clinton recorded a duet version of the song called "Flashlight (Spaceflight)" for the 1999 film Muppets from Space along with Bill Barretta as Pepe the King Prawn.

The song was used in Guardians of the Galaxy Vol. 2 credits, and was included in the film's soundtrack.

== Charts ==
Chart (1978)	Peak position
Canada Top Singles (RPM)	24
US Billboard Hot 100	16
US Hot Soul Singles (Billboard)	1

== Certifications ==
Region	Certification	Certified units/sales
United States (RIAA)	Gold	1,000,000^{^}
^{^} Shipments figures based on certification alone.
