= Up for the Down Stroke =

Studio album by Parliament
- Released: July 3, 1974
- Recorded: 1973–1974
- Genres: Funk; disco
- Length: 39:12
- Label: Casablanca
- Producer: George Clinton

Parliament chronology
Osmium (1970)	Up for the Down Stroke (1974)	Chocolate City (1975)

Singles from Up for the Down Stroke
- 1. "Up for the Down Stroke" / "Presence of a Brain" Released: June 1974; 2. "Testify" / "I Can Move You" Released: November 1974; 3. "The Goose (Part 1)" / "The Goose (Part 2)" Released: 1974

Professional ratings
Review scores
Source	Rating
AllMusic	4/5 stars
Blender	5/5 stars
Christgau's Record Guide	A−
Pitchfork	8.3/10
Rolling Stone	4/5 stars
The New Rolling Stone Album Guide	3.5/5 stars
Spin	8/10

Up for the Down Stroke is the second album by the American funk band Parliament. It is their first to be released on Casablanca Records. The album was released on July 3, 1974. Its title track was Parliament's first chart hit and remains one of the most well-known P-Funk songs. The album also contains a funk reworking of the Parliaments' song "(I Wanna) Testify" under the title "Testify". The original title of the album was Whatever Makes Baby Feel Good, and the cover featured group leader George Clinton hovering over a woman in distress, sporting a black wig and monster-type gloves.

Up for the Down Stroke rekindled George Clinton's professional relationship with bassist Bootsy Collins, who had taken a two-year hiatus from the group. Collins would play a pivotal role in all of the Parliament albums released through Casablanca Records.

== Track listing ==
Credits taken from LP liner notes.

Side one
No.	Title	Writer(s)	Length
1.	"Up for the Down Stroke"	George Clinton, Bootsy Collins, Fuzzy Haskins, Bernie Worrell	5:07
2.	"Testify"	Clinton, Deron Taylor	3:29
3.	"The Goose"	Clinton, Eddie Hazel	9:09
4.	"I Can Move You (If You Let Me)"	Clinton, Cordell Mosson, Worrell, Collins	2:44

Side two
No.	Title	Writer(s)	Length
1.	"I Just Got Back (From the Fantasy, Ahead of Our Time in the Four Lands of Ellet)"	Peter Chase	4:28
2.	"All Your Goodies Are Gone"	Clinton, Haskins, Billy "Bass" Nelson	5:02
3.	"Whatever Makes Baby Feel Good"	Clinton, Hazel	5:55
4.	"Presence of a Brain"	Clinton, Garry Shider	3:18
Total length:			39:12

2003 Remastered Bonus Tracks (Previously Unreleased)
No.	Title	Length
9.	"Up for the Down Stroke (Alternate Mix)"	5:39
10.	"Testify (Alternate Mix)"	4:03
11.	"Singing Another Song"	3:04
Total length:		51:58

"Up for the Down Stroke" was later remade by Fred Wesley and the Horny Horns on their first album, A Blow for Me, a Toot to You. "Testify", "The Goose", and "All Your Goodies Are Gone" were remade from old Parliaments tunes from the 1960s. "Whatever Makes My Baby Feel Good" was remade from the 1968 tune of the same name by Rose Williams and Funkadelic, however, Funkadelic had revamped it earlier in 1973 with the track "Can't Stand the Strain". There is another version of "The Goose" recorded by Funkadelic in 1970, which showed up on Toys, released in 2008. The vocal group the Dells covered "Testify" and "All Your Goodies Are Gone" in 1978.

== Personnel ==
- George Clinton – Lead Vocals on "Testify", "The Goose", "I Just Got Back", and "All Your Goodies Are Gone", Co-lead Vocals on "Up for the Down Stroke", Arrangement, Producer, Vocals
- Bernie Worrell – Arrangement, Keyboards
- Eddie Hazel – Lead Vocals on "Presence of a Brain", Co-lead vocals on "Up for the Down Stroke", Vocals, Guitar, Arrangement
- Bootsy Collins – Bass, Guitar, Drums
- Garry Shider – Lead Vocals on "I Can Move You", Guitar, Vocals
- Ron Bykowski – Guitar
- Cordell Mosson – Bass
- Gary Bronson – Drums
- Ramon "Tiki" Fulwood – Drums
- Raymond Davis – Vocals
- Clarence "Fuzzy" Haskins – Co-lead vocals on "Up for the Down Stroke", Vocals
- Calvin Simon – Vocals
- Grady Thomas – Vocals
- Peter Chase – Whistling on "I Just Got Back"
- Ralph – Engineer
- Tom "Curly" Ruff – Mastering
- Rod Dyer – Design
- Jon Echeverrieta – Design
