= Chocolate City (song) =

Single by Parliament

from the album Chocolate City
- B-side: "Chocolate City (long version)"
- Released: May 1975
- Genre: Funk/R&B
- Length: 3:08
- Label: Casablanca 831
- Songwriter(s): George Clinton; Bootsy Collins; Bernie Worrell
- Producer(s): George Clinton

"Chocolate City" is a song by the funk band Parliament, the lead track of their 1975 album of the same name. It was also released as a two-part single, the first from the album.

== Background ==
The song's largely spoken vocals (delivered by George Clinton) express pride in "Chocolate Cities", that is, cities with a majority black population. The song also reflects on the solidarity of African-American society at the time. The singer playfully hypothesizes what it would be like if there were an African American in the White House, and assigns the following people to positions in government:

- Muhammad Ali - President of the United States
- James Brown - Vice President of the United States
- Reverend Ike - Secretary of the Treasury
- Richard Pryor - Minister of Education (fictional - the United States Department of Education was not created until 1979, and was headed by a Secretary)
- Stevie Wonder - Secretary of Fine Arts (fictional; the closest existing agency is the National Endowment for the Arts)
- Aretha Franklin - First Lady

Clinton's lyrics referred to Chocolate City as "my piece of the rock", as opposed to the "40 acres and a mule" that slaves were promised after the Civil War. The song closes with phrase "Just got New York, I'm told."

== "Chocolate" cities in the song ==
- Washington, D.C. - Clinton says that the real chocolate city is the capital
- Newark, New Jersey
- Gary, Indiana
- Los Angeles, California
- Atlanta, Georgia
- New York, New York

== Chart performance ==
Chart (1975)	Peak position
U.S. Billboard Hot 100	94
U.S. Billboard Hot Soul Singles	24
