= Aqua Boogie (A Psychoalphadiscobetabioaquadoloop) =

- U.S picture sleeve for the single "Aqua Boogie"

Single by Parliament

from the album Motor Booty Affair
- B-side: "You're A Fish (And I'm a Water Sign)"
- Released: November 1978
- Genre: Funk
- Length: 9:22 (12" version); 6:40 (album version); 4:25 (7" version)
- Label: Casablanca; NB 950
- Songwriter(s): George Clinton; Bootsy Collins; Bernie Worrell
- Producer(s): George Clinton

"Aqua Boogie (A Psychoalphadiscobetabioaquadoloop)" is a song by funk band Parliament. The track was released from their 1978 album, Motor Booty Affair. The song describes being compelled to learn to swim despite the persistent fear of water and drowning, comparing it to the reluctance to dance.

== Background ==
The track features lead vocals by George Clinton, Garry Shider, Ray Davis, and newly recruited member Walter "Junie" Morrison. It is one of the last P-Funk tracks written by core members Clinton, bassist Bootsy Collins, and keyboardist Bernie Worrell.

== Personnel ==
- George Clinton, Garry Shider, Ray Davis, Walter Morrison, Ramond Spruell (bird calls) - lead vocals
- Garry Shider, Bootsy Collins, Phelps Collins - guitars
- Bernie Worrell - keyboard
- Gary Mudbone Cooper - drums
- Mallia Franklin, Shirley Hayden, Cheryl James, Lynn Mabry, Dawn Silva, Linda Brown, Richard "Kush" Griffith, Raymond Spruell, Mike "Clip" Payne, Joey Zalabok, Robert "P-Nut" Johnson, Larry Heckstall, Overton Loyd - backing vocals

== Chart performance ==
"Aqua Boogie (A Psychoalphadiscobetabioaquadoloop)" spent four weeks at number one on the R&B singles chart during the winter of 1979. It peaked at number 89 on the Billboard Hot 100 singles chart.
