= Bop Gun (Endangered Species) =

Single by Parliament

from the album Funkentelechy Vs. the Placebo Syndrome
- B-side: "I've Been Watching You"
- Released: October 29, 1977
- Genre: Funk
- Length: 8:31 (album version); 4:20 (single version)
- Label: Casablanca 900
- Songwriter(s): George Clinton; Bootsy Collins; Garry Shider
- Producer(s): George Clinton

"Bop Gun (Endangered Species)" is a song by the funk band Parliament, the lead track on their 1977 album Funkentelechy Vs. the Placebo Syndrome. It was released as the album's first single. The song's lead vocal is performed by Glenn Goins, his last performance on a P-Funk record.

The Bop Gun is an imaginary weapon that makes whatever it shoots funky. It was used as a stage prop in Parliament's late-1970s concerts. George Clinton is depicted wielding it on the cover of the Funkentelechy Vs. the Placebo Syndrome album. It is also featured on the cover of Funkadelic's 1979 album Uncle Jam Wants You.

== Charts ==
=== Weekly charts ===
Chart (1977–1978)	Peak position
US Hot R&B/Hip-Hop Songs (Billboard)	14
