= Mothership Connection Newberg Session =

Live album by George Clinton
- Released: 1995
- Recorded: 1976
- Genre: Funk
- Length: 52:58
- Label: P-Vine
- Producer: George Clinton

Mothership Connection Newberg Session is a live album by George Clinton and Parliament-Funkadelic. It was recorded in Hangar E at Stewart Airfield in Newburgh, New York, on September 26, 1976, during the rehearsals for the P-Funk Earth Tour. The live album was released by P-Vine Records in Japan on December 25, 1995.

One song that was recorded during the rehearsal, "Cosmic Slop," was released in 1976 on the Funkadelic album Hardcore Jollies. Another song from the rehearsal, "Tear The Roof Off The Sucker Medley," was released in 1977 on Parliament's Live: P-Funk Earth Tour, bolstered by canned audience responses. These two tracks were not included on the Mothership Connection Newberg Session album. The two songs in the final track on Mothership Connection Newberg Session, "Maggot Brain"/"Good To Your Earhole," were recorded during the 1993 P-Funk All-Stars concert in Japan. Despite being heavily sought by collectors, Mothership Connection Newberg Session has never been released outside of Japan.

== Track listing ==
No.	Title	Length
1.	"Mothership Connection (Star Child)"	7:19
2.	"Dr. Funkenstein"	9:51
3.	"Do That Stuff"	4:44
4.	"Standing on the Verge of Getting It On / Undisco Kidd"	7:33
5.	"Getting To Know You"	6:41
6.	"Comin' Round The Mountain"	3:12
7.	"Maggot Brain / Good To Your Earhole"	13:38
Total length:		52:58

== Musicians ==
Parliament

- Bass: Cordell Mosson
- Guitars: Michael Hampton, Garry Shider, Glenn Goins
- Drums: Jerome Brailey
- Keyboards: Bernie Worrell
- Vocals: George Clinton, Glen Goins, Garry Shider, Fuzzy Haskins, Grady Thomas, Calvin Simon, Ray Davis, Debbie Wright, Jeanette Washington

Horny Horns

- Saxophone: Maceo Parker
- Trombone: Fred Wesley
- Trumpet: Richard Griffith, Rick Gardner
