= Live: P-Funk Earth Tour =

Live album by Parliament
- Released: May 5, 1977
- Recorded: January 19, 1977, at the Los Angeles Forum and January 21, 1977, at the Oakland Coliseum Arena
- Genre: Funk
- Length: 82:39 (LP); 75:58 (CD)
- Label: Casablanca
- Producer: George Clinton

Parliament chronology
The Clones of Dr. Funkenstein (1976)	Live: P-Funk Earth Tour (1977)	Funkentelechy Vs. the Placebo Syndrome (1977)

Professional ratings
Review scores
Source	Rating
AllMusic	4/5 stars
Christgau's Record Guide	B+

Live: P-Funk Earth Tour is a live double album by Parliament that documents the band's 1977 P-Funk Earth Tour. The performances include songs from Parliament's albums through The Clones of Dr. Funkenstein as well as songs from the Funkadelic repertoire. The album is made up of portions of two performances from January 1977 at the Oakland Coliseum Arena and the Los Angeles Forum.

The track "The Landing (Of the Holy Mothership)" is a musical montage that mixes clips of various P-Funk recordings with broadcast news-style commentary from George Clinton. The original vinyl release contained a 22 × 33" inch poster of George Clinton dressed as Dr. Funkenstein (photo by Diem Jones), as well as an iron-on T-shirt transfer that boasted the slogan "Take Funk To Heaven in '77!". "Parliament Live" became the group's third album to be certified gold.

== Track listing ==
1. "P-Funk (Wants to Get Funked Up)" – 6:13 (released as a 12" promo single-Casablanca NBD 20103 DJ)
2. "Dr. Funkenstein's Supergroovalisticprosifunkstication Medley: Let’s Take It To The Stage/Take Your Dead Ass Home" – 4:58
3. "Do That Stuff" – 5:14
4. "The Landing (Of the Holy Mothership)" – 3:04 (released as the b-side of "Fantasy Is Reality")
5. "The Undisco Kidd (The Girl Is Bad!)" – 7:02
6. "Children of Production" – 2:50
7. "Mothership Connection (Star Child)" – 5:51
8. "Swing Down, Sweet Chariot" – 5:06 (released as a 12" promo single-Casablanca NBD 20103 DJ)
9. "This Is the Way We Funk with You" – 5:03
10. "Dr. Funkenstein" – 15:07
11. "Gamin' On Ya!" – 4:09 (released as a 12" promo single-Casablanca NBD 20103 DJ)
12. "Tear the Roof Off the Sucker Medley: Give Up The Funk (Tear The Roof Off The Sucker)/Get Off Your Ass And Jam" – 4:57
13. "Night of the Thumpasorus People" – 6:13
14. "Fantasy Is Reality" – 6:40 (released as a single-Casablanca 892 and 12" single-Casablanca 20103 DJ)

Note: The last track from the original double LP release, "Fantasy Is Reality", was omitted on the CD reissue due to space restrictions.

== Personnel ==
- Vocals: George Clinton, Calvin Simon, Fuzzy Haskins, Raymond Davis, Grady Thomas, Garry Shider, Glenn Goins, Debbie Wright, Jeanette Washington
- Horns: Fred Wesley, Maceo Parker, Rick Gardner, Richard Griffith
- Bass: Cordell Mosson, Bootsy Collins
- Guitars: Garry Shider, Michael Hampton, Glen Goins, Eddie Hazel
- Drums & Percussion: Jerome Brailey
- Keyboards & Synthesizers: Bernie Worrell
- Extra-Singing Clones: Lynn Mabry, Dawn Silva, Gary Cooper
- Lead Snore on "This Is The Way We Funk With You": Michael Hampton
- Horn Arrangements: Bernie Worrell & Fred Wesley
- Rhythm Arrangements: Bootsy Collins & George Clinton
