= Live...Madison Square Garden 1977 =

Live album by Parliament-Funkadelic
- Released: November 2017
- Recorded: September 26, 1976
- Genre: Funk
- Length: 53:08
- Label: RoxVox

Parliament-Funkadelic chronology
Live...Capitol Theatre 1978 (2017)	Live...Madison Square Garden 1977 (2017)

Live...Madison Square Garden 1977 is a live album by the American funk band Parliament-Funkadelic. The album was released on CD and vinyl in the UK in November 2017 by the RoxVox label. The CD incorrectly states that it features a live performance from the band at Madison Square Garden in 1977, when in actuality, the recording features the rehearsals for the Mothership Connection tour, done on September 26, 1976, at Stewart International Airport in Newburgh, New York. The liner notes feature a transcription of a December 1977 article about Parliament-Funkadelic from Circus (magazine) magazine.

== Track listing ==
1. Mothership Connection (Star Child)
2. Dr. Funkenstein
3. Do That Stuff
4. Standing On The Verge Of Getting It On> Undisco Kidd
5. Gettin' To Know You
6. Coming Round The Mountain
7. Maggot Brain> Good To Your Earhole

== Personnel ==
- Bass: Cordell Mosson
- Guitars: Michael Hampton, Garry Shider, Glenn Goins
- Drums: Jerome Brailey
- Horns: Fred Wesley (trombone), Maceo Parker (saxophone), Richard Griffith (trumpet), and Rick Gardner (trumpet)
- Keyboards: Bernie Worrell
- Vocals: George Clinton, Glen Goins, Garry Shider, Fuzzy Haskins, Grady Thomas, Calvin Simon, Ray Davis, Debbie Wright, Jeanette Washington
