= Children of Production =

Music genre

Children Of Production ia an innovative derivative of P-Funk.

The terminology used in the P Funk mythology to describe the Clones of Dr Funkenstein, "a flawless testimony to the attainment of the P Funk" specially designed to aid Dr. Funkenstein in his mission to funkatize the Earth.

== History ==
- Clones of Dr. Funkenstein (1976)

Children Of Production is the fourth track from the 1976 Parliament album The Clones of Dr. Funkenstein, featuring rich and Christmassy swinging brass hooks, and trippy and sometimes controversial lyrics sung by the Clones themselves.

- Key lyrical sequences

"We are children of production, produced in conjunction, with the urgency of our Dr. Funkenstein. In his wisdom he forenotions, The shortcomings of your condition, So we the Clones were designed"

"We are deeper than abortion Deeper than the notion That the world was flat when it was round."

- Musicians

Recording on the 1976 album The Clones of Dr. Funkenstein were:

- Vocals: George Clinton, Calvin Simon, Fuzzy Haskins, Raymond Davis, Grady Thomas, Garry Shider, Glenn Goins, Bootsy Collins
- Bass: Bootsy Collins, Cordell Mosson
- Extra Singing Clones: Debbie Edwards, Taka Khan, Gary Cooper
- Horns: Fred Wesley, Maceo Parker, Rick Gardner, Michael Brecker, Randy Brecker
- Guitars: Garry Shider, Michael Hampton, Glen Goins
- Drums & Percussion: Jerome Brailey, Bootsy Collins, Gary Cooper
- Keyboards & Synthesizers: Bernie Worrell

== Children Of Production: The Band ==
A P Funk/hip hop band from George Clinton's label The C Kunspyruhzy, composed of key members of the P Funk All Stars. Following on with the sentiments of the 1976 record, these new Children Of Production are also on a mission to assist the re-funkification of the world, rolling on a hip hop trip that's heavy with the legacy of The Funk. Their debut album, also titled Children Of Production was released in 2006 and features a revisitation of the original 1976 track.

- Members
- Sativa Diva (Shonda Clinton, George Clinton's granddaughter).
- Kendra Foster
- New Jeruz
- Ric Smoov (Rico Lewis, George Clinton's grandson)
- Stevie Matrixx
- Danny
- Citrus (Chris Sauthoff)
- Young Heff

The original lineup was Rapheal Sadiiq. Amp Fiddler, Joi Gilliam, Keisha Jackson, Rob Bacon, CatDaddy, Chop Horns, Mike Clip Payne, Martin Luther, Darryl Dixon and drummer, Stephen Perkins.

== See also ==
- List of P-Funk members
