= Mothership Connection =

Studio album by Parliament
- Released: December 15, 1975
- Recorded: March–October 1975
- Studios: United Sound, Detroit, Michigan, and Hollywood Sound, Hollywood, California
- Genres: Funk; R&B; funk rock; disco; progressive soul
- Length: 38:18
- Labels: Casablanca; NBLP 7022
- Producer: George Clinton

Parliament chronology
Chocolate City (1975)	Mothership Connection (1975)	The Clones of Dr. Funkenstein (1976)

Singles from Mothership Connection
- 1. "P. Funk (Wants to Get Funked Up)" Released: 1976; 2. "Tear the Roof Off the Sucker (Give Up the Funk)" Released: 1976; 3. "Star Child (Mothership Connection)" Released: 1976

Mothership Connection is the fourth album by the American funk band Parliament, released on December 15, 1975, on Casablanca Records. This concept album is often rated among the best Parliament-Funkadelic releases, and was the first to feature horn players Maceo Parker and Fred Wesley, previously of James Brown's backing band the J.B.'s.

Mothership Connection became Parliament's first album to be certified gold and later platinum. It was supported by the hit "Give Up the Funk (Tear the Roof off the Sucker)," the band's first million-selling single. The Library of Congress added the album to the National Recording Registry in 2011, declaring that it "has had an enormous influence on jazz, rock and dance music."

== Concept ==
The album is held together by an outer-space theme. Describing the concept, George Clinton said "We had put black people in situations nobody ever thought they would be in, like the White House. I figured another place you wouldn't think black people would be was in outer space. I was a big fan of Star Trek, so we did a thing with a pimp sitting in a spaceship shaped like a Cadillac, and we did all these James Brown-type grooves, but with street talk and ghetto slang." The album's concept would form the backbone of P-Funk's concert performances during the 1970s, in which a large spaceship prop known as the Mothership would be lowered onto the stage.

BBC Music described the album as a pioneering work of Afrofuturism "set in a future universe where black astronauts interact with alien worlds." Journalist Frasier McAlpine stated: "As a reaction to an increasingly fraught 1970s urban environment in which African-American communities faced the end of the optimism of the civil rights era, this flamboyant imagination (and let's be frank, exceptional funkiness) was both righteous and joyful."

== Reception ==
Professional ratings
Review scores
Source	Rating
AllMusic	5/5 stars
Billboard	(favorable)
Blender	5/5 stars
Christgau's Record Guide	A−
Pitchfork	8.5/10
PopMatters	(favorable)
The Rolling Stone Album Guide	5/5 stars
Spin Alternative Record Guide	10/10
Sputnikmusic	5/5

On release, Rolling Stone called the album a "parody of modern funk" and stated that "unlike the Ohio Players or Commodores, the group refuses to play it straight. Instead, Clinton spews his jive, conceived from some cosmic funk vision." In a positive review, Village Voice critic Robert Christgau stated that Clinton "keeps the beat going with nothing but his rap, some weird keyboard, and cymbals for stretches of side one," and described "Give Up the Funk" as "galactic."

Retrospectively, Mothership Connection has been widely acclaimed, and it is typically considered to be one of the best albums by the Parliament-Funkadelic collective. Rolling Stone's 2003 review gave the record 5 stars: "The masterpiece, the slang creator, the icon builder, the master narrative--or 'the bomb,' as Clinton succinctly put it before anyone else." Jason Birchmeier of AllMusic called it "the definitive Parliament-Funkadelic album," in which "George Clinton's revolving band lineups, differing musical approaches, and increasingly thematic album statements reached an ideal state, one that resulted in enormous commercial success as well as a timeless legacy."

Dr. Dre famously sampled "Mothership Connection (Star Child)" on "Let Me Ride" and "P. Funk (Wants to Get Funked Up)" on "The Roach (The Chronic Outro)", both from his 1992 album The Chronic.

The album has received many retrospective accolades, including being named VH1's 55th greatest album of all time. In 2012, it was ranked at number 276 on Rolling Stone's list of the 500 greatest albums of all time; it was featured again on the 2020 edition, at number 363. Vibe listed Mothership Connection in their "Essential Black Rock Recordings" list, and it was included in the 2005 book 1001 Albums You Must Hear Before You Die.

== Track listing ==
Side One
No.	Title	Writer(s)	Length
1.	"P. Funk (Wants to Get Funked Up)"	George Clinton, Bootsy Collins, Bernie Worrell	7:41
2.	"Mothership Connection (Star Child)"	Clinton, Collins, Worrell	6:13
3.	"Unfunky UFO"	Clinton, Collins, Garry Shider	4:23
Total length:			18:17

Side Two
No.	Title	Writer(s)	Length
4.	"Supergroovalisticprosifunkstication"	Clinton, Collins, Shider, Worrell	5:03
5.	"Handcuffs"	Clinton, Glenn Goins, Janet McLaughlin	4:02
6.	"Give Up the Funk (Tear the Roof off the Sucker)"	Jerome Brailey, Clinton, Collins	5:46
7.	"Night of the Thumpasorus Peoples"	Clinton, Collins, Shider	5:10
Total length:			20:01 38:18

2003 CD remaster bonus track
No.	Title	Writer(s)	Length
8.	"Star Child (Mothership Connection)" (Promo Radio Version)	Clinton, Collins, Worrell	3:08
Total length:			41:26

== Personnel ==
- Vocals – George Clinton (lead on "P. Funk (Wants to Get Funked Up)" and "Mothership Connection (Star Child)"), Calvin Simon, Fuzzy Haskins, Ray Davis, Grady Thomas, Gary Shider (co-lead on "Handcuffs"), Glenn Goins (lead on "Unfunky UFO" and "Handcuffs"), Bootsy Collins
- Horns – Fred Wesley, Maceo Parker, Michael Brecker, Randy Brecker, Boom, Joe Farrell
- Bass guitar – Bootsy Collins, Cordell Mosson
- Guitars – Garry Shider, Michael Hampton, Glenn Goins, Bootsy Collins
- Drums and percussion – Tiki Fulwood, Jerome Brailey, Bootsy Collins, Gary Cooper
- Keyboards – Bernie Worrell (Minimoog, Wurlitzer electric piano, ARP Pro Soloist and String Ensemble, RMI Electra Piano, Hammond organ, grand piano, Fender Rhodes, Clavinet D6)
- Backing vocals and handclaps – Gary Cooper, Debbie Edwards, Taka Kahn, Archie Ivy, Bryna Chimenti, Rasputin Boutte, Pam Vincent, Debra Wright, Sidney Barnes

Production

- Produced by George Clinton
- Engineered by Jim Vitti (in Detroit, Michigan), Ralph (Oops) Jim Callon (in Hollywood, California)
- Mastered by Allen Zentz
- Photography by David Alexander
- Art Direction and Design by Gribbitt!

== Chart positions ==
Chart (1976)	Peak position
US Billboard 200	13
US R&B Albums	4

== Certification ==
Region	Certification	Certified units/sales
United States (RIAA)	Platinum	1,000,000^{^}
^{^} Shipments figures based on certification alone.

== See also ==
- Afrofuturism
- Album era
