= Progressive soul =

Music genre

- Other names: Prog-soul; black prog; black rock; progressive R&B
- Stylistic origins: Soul; funk; progressive rock; psychedelic soul; jazz fusion
- Cultural origins: Late 1960s – early 1970s, United States
- Derivative forms: Neo soul; alternative R&B (Note: Both neo soul and alternative R&B have been used interchangeably with reference to progressive soul at the turn of the 21st century.)

Other topics
- Afrofuturism; album era; avant-funk; Black Arts Movement; concept album; funk rock; progressive rap; psychedelic funk; recording studio as an instrument

Progressive soul (often shortened to prog-soul; also called black prog, black rock, and progressive R&B) is a type of African-American music that uses a progressive approach, particularly in the context of the soul and funk genres. It developed in the late 1960s and early 1970s through the recordings of innovative black musicians who pushed the structural and stylistic boundaries of those genres. Among their influences were musical forms that arose from rhythm and blues music's transformation into rock, such as Motown, progressive rock, psychedelic soul, and jazz fusion.

Progressive soul music can feature an eclectic range of influences, from both African and European sources. Musical characteristics commonly found in works of the genre are traditional R&B melodies, complex vocal patterns, rhythmically unified extended composition, ambitious rock guitar, and instrumental techniques borrowed from jazz. Prog-soul artists often write songs around album-oriented concepts and socially conscious topics based in the African-American experience, left-wing politics, and bohemianism, sometimes employing thematic devices from Afrofuturism and science fiction. Their lyrics, while challenging, can also be marked by irony and humor.

The original progressive soul movement peaked in the 1970s with the works of Stevie Wonder, Marvin Gaye, Curtis Mayfield, Sly and the Family Stone, Parliament-Funkadelic, and Earth, Wind & Fire, among others. Since the 1980s, both prominent American and British acts have recorded music in its tradition, including Prince, Peter Gabriel, Sade, Bilal, and Janelle Monáe. The neo soul wave of the late 1990s and early 2000s, featuring the Soulquarians collective, is considered a derivative development of the genre.

== History ==
=== Origins in early R&B and rock ===
By the mid-1950s, rhythm and blues was transitioning from its blues and big band-based jazz origins toward the musical forms that would be known more broadly as rock music. (Note: The term "rock music" had gradually displaced "rock and roll" by the 1980s with the rise of serious critical study around the genre and a decline in stereotyping the music as being exclusively for teenage listeners.) This trend was expedited by the exposure of young white listeners and musicians to African-American music played by ambitious disc jockeys on radio stations in the Northern United States. However, partly in response to jealousy among veteran performers and prejudice in general, recording acts in the early rock era generally gravitated toward either one of the three stylistic influences from which the genre had primarily originated – R&B, country, and pop.

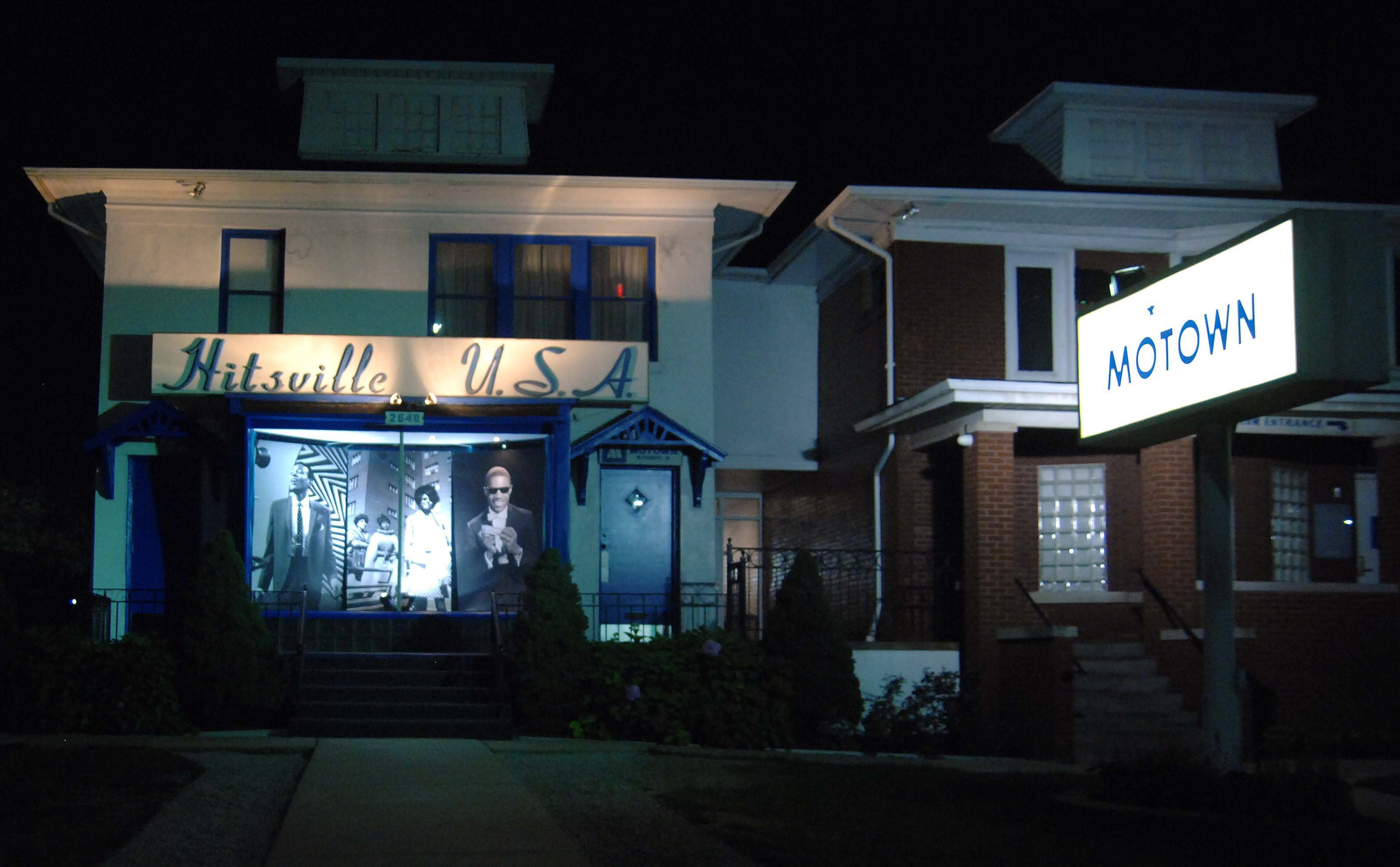
Hitsville U.S.A., Motown's former studio-headquarters and now museum, with photos of Marvin Gaye, The Supremes, and Stevie Wonder in the window display

In the mid-1960s, several new musical forms arose that diversified rock. Among them was the Motown sound of Detroit-based Motown Records, which released more refined and slick productions distinct from other R&B-leaning rock. The music academic Bill Martin traces the origins of progressive soul to Motown as well as Ray Charles and James Brown, whose recordings altogether span as early as the 1950s, while the jazz writer Rob Backus cites an early example in the Impressions' 1964 song "Keep On Pushing". Progressive rock, another emerging subgenre, utilized an eclectic range of elements such as exotic instrumentation from classical and folk, along with highly developed lyrical concepts composed across album-length works. This trend emphasized the album format over the single and reached mainstream culture with the Beatles' 1967 album Sgt. Pepper's Lonely Hearts Club Band. Concurrently, psychedelic rock utilized electronic innovations with a harder sound primarily intended to induce or enhance the listener's consciousness rather than for relaxation, dance, or analytical listening.

In the late 1960s, the structural and stylistic boundaries of African-American music were pushed further by the psychedelic experimentation of black rock acts like Jimi Hendrix, Arthur Lee's Love, and the Chambers Brothers. The jazz trumpeter-bandleader Miles Davis also made an impact with his wide-ranging fusion experiments, which incorporated elements from rock, electronic, avant-garde, and Eastern music. As with folk rock earlier in the decade, jazz fusion was another emerging subform to concede rock influences in a parent genre that had otherwise been exclusive to a cultural elite. These events inspired greater musical sophistication and diversity of influences, ambitious lyricism, and conceptual album-oriented approaches in black popular music, leading to the development of progressive soul.

=== Development and characteristics ===
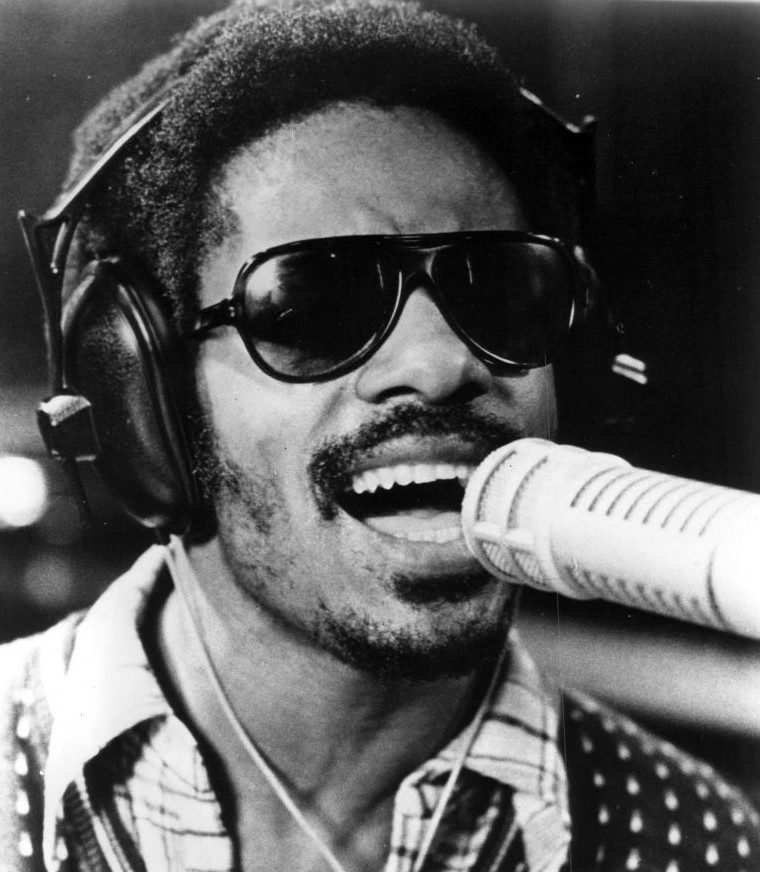
Stevie Wonder (shown in 1973) recorded a series of innovative prog-soul albums in the 1970s.

By the 1970s, many African-American recording artists primarily working in the soul and funk genres were creating music in a manner influenced by progressive rock. According to music critic Geoffrey Himes, this "progressive-soul movement flourished" from 1968 to 1973 and demonstrated "adventurous rock guitar, socially conscious lyrics and classic R&B melody", while AllMusic says the genre was "flowering" in 1971. Among the musicians at its forefront were Sly Stone (bandleader for Sly and the Family Stone), Stevie Wonder, Marvin Gaye, Curtis Mayfield, and George Clinton (bandleader for Parliament and Funkadelic). Under Berry Gordy's leadership at Motown, Gaye and Wonder were reluctantly given artistic control to approach their albums more seriously in what had generally been a single-focused soul genre, leading to a series of innovative records from the two during the 1970s. Similar to white prog musicians, black artists of this movement directed their creative control toward ideals of "individualism, artistic progression and writing for posterity", along with concerns related to the African-American experience, according to ethnomusicologist and University of Colorado Boulder music professor Jay Keister. However, he notes that the pursuit of individuality sometimes challenged the collective political values of the Black Arts Movement. Himes categorizes the progressive soul movement as "left-wing" and "bohemian" in the sense of "any culture with a middle class to produce young people who are more interested in the unfettered exploration of intellectual, artistic, sexual and political possibilities than in the mainstream goals of wealth, power and conformity"; he adds that this subculture among African Americans grew in proportion to their emerging middle class.

Many of the leading African-American musicians were riding the progressive wave at the same time as white musicians, but with one major difference. If the overall imperative of the time was that music must progress, for African Americans it was more specifically that "our music must progress."

— Jay Keister, "Black Prog: Soul, Funk, Intellect and the Progressive Side of Black Music of the 1970s"

Among the prog-rock characteristics shared in black progressive music of this period were extended composition, diverse musical appropriation, and making music for the purpose of concentrated listening as opposed to dancing. Progressive soul vocalists incorporated complex patterns in their singing, while instrumentalists used techniques learned from jazz. Unlike the European art music resources used by progressive white artists, who tended to distinguish their extended compositions with song-based suites, African-American counterparts favored musical idioms from both African-American and African sources, including the use of an underlying rhythmic groove to unify an extended recording. Altering instrumental textures were also used instead as a way of signifying a change in the section of an extended track. Applications of these elements featured in songs such as Funkadelic's "Wars of Armageddon" (1971) and Sun Ra's "Space Is the Place" (1973). The contemporaneous album-length works of Isaac Hayes were often extended and elaborately composed R&B jams characterized by leitmotifs and his spoken interludes (known as "raps").

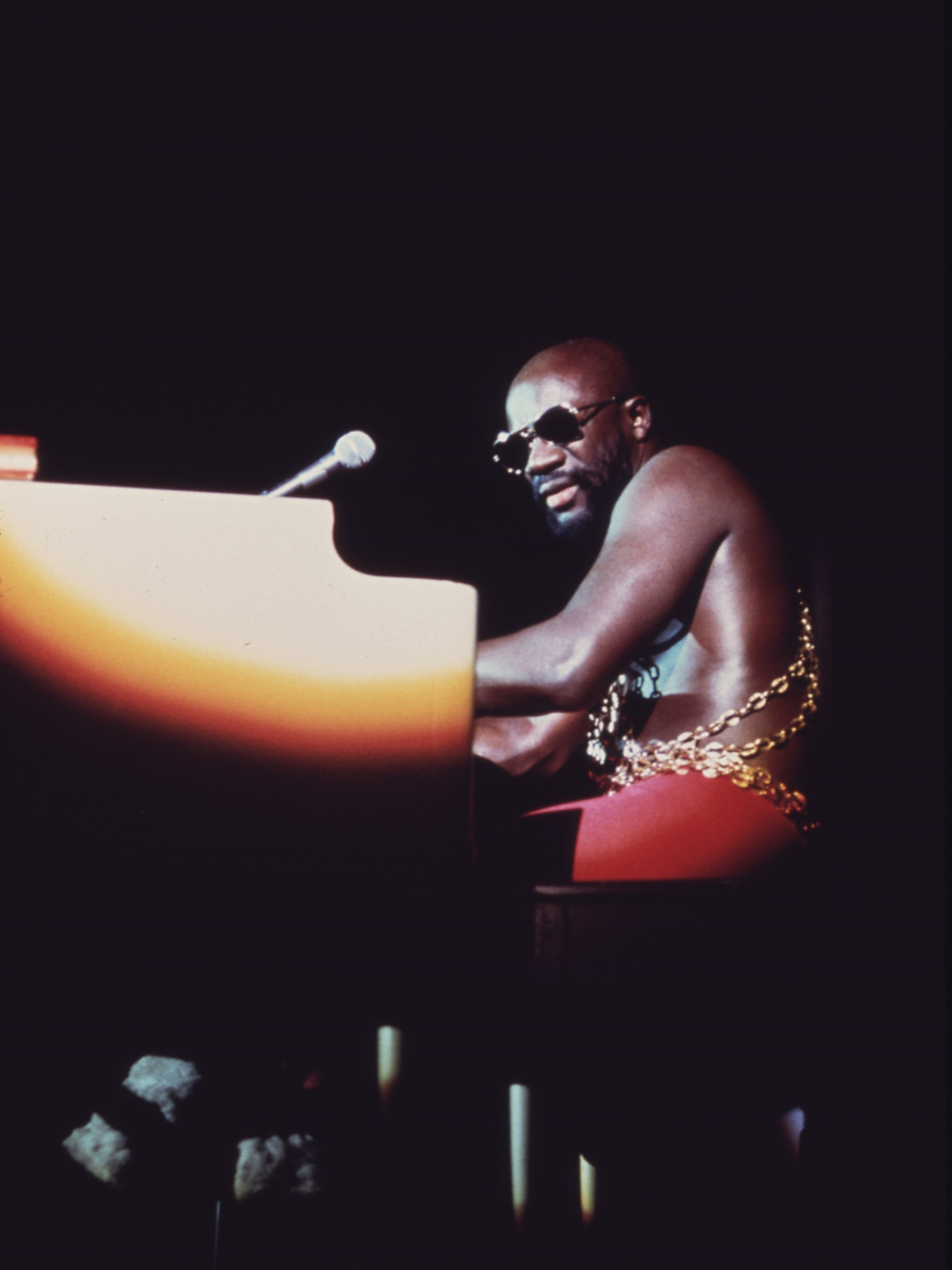
Isaac Hayes (shown in 1973) was a singer-songwriter, producer, and multi-instrumentalist in the genre.

Progressive soul musicians also used a variety of non-traditional influences, much like the Beatles had in the 1960s. Clinton's Parliament-Funkadelic collective prominently used influences from psychedelia alongside those from Brown and the Motown sound. Both Clinton's collective and Sun Ra applied thematic concepts associated with Afrofuturism and outer space mythology. Some artists borrowed elements from European-American traditions to augment a song's lyrical idea. For example, Wonder added pleasant-sounding instrumental textures from a string ensemble to "Village Ghetto Land" (1976), lending a sense of irony to the song's otherwise bleak critique of social ills in urban ghettos. Mayfield's socially- and politically charged 1970 album Curtis featured both the extended prog-soul song "Move on Up" and orchestral-laden works like "Wild and Free", which employed harps to produce distinctive timbres. Gaye's 1971 album What's Going On was composed as a social-protest song cycle unified by both rhythmic and melodic motifs. Clinton also explored the African-American experience and drew on "Black Power" literature as well as the music of Bob Dylan and the Beatles, pointing specifically to the latter's element of nonsense on songs like "I Am the Walrus" (1967). However, Clinton's themes were more party-centric, influenced by contemporary street culture, and often incorporated lowbrow elements of absurdity and toilet humor similar to the experimental rock musician Frank Zappa's recordings with The Mothers of Invention.

The San Francisco music scene of the late 1960s and early 1970s was "a workshop for progressive soul", according to cultural anthropologist Micaela di Leonardo, who credits the radio station KDIA with showcasing the music of local acts like Sly and the Family Stone and Tower of Power. Popular with the hippie audience, Stone's songs appealed to tolerance, peace, and integration along racial and social lines, while his leadership of the Family Stone made them among the first racially- and gender-integrated popular acts. The Philadelphia station WDAS-FM, which had been progressive rock-oriented in the late 1960s, changed to a progressive soul format in 1971 and over time developed into an important media source for the African-American community. Progressive soul stations played extended soul recordings past the typical single length, as was the case with the nine-and-a-half-minute-long Temptations single "Runaway Child, Running Wild" (1969). Hayes' 1969 recording of "Walk on By" is considered a classic prog-soul single.

In discussing the exemplary prog-soul albums of this period, Himes names Hendrix's Electric Ladyland (1968), the Temptations' Cloud Nine (1968), Sly and the Family Stone's Stand! (1968), Gaye's What's Going On (1971), Funkadelic's Maggot Brain (1971), Mayfield's Super Fly (1972), War's The World Is a Ghetto (1972), Earth Wind & Fire's Head to the Sky (1973), and Wonder's Innervisions (1973). Martin also cites albums from Wonder (Innervisions, along with 1972's Talking Book and 1976's Songs in the Key of Life) and War (The World Is a Ghetto, along with 1971's All Day Music and 1973's War Live), as well as the Isley Brothers (3 + 3 from 1973 and Harvest for the World from 1976). The 1975 albums That's the Way of the World (by Earth, Wind & Fire) and Mothership Connection (by Parliament) are other notable releases, with the latter a concept album culminating Clinton's Afrofuturist musical aspirations. Wonder's mid 1970s albums are also highlighted by The Times writer Dominic Maxwell as "prog soul of the highest order, pushing the form yet always heartfelt, ambitious and listenable", with Songs in the Key of Life regarded as a peak for its endless musical ideas and lavish yet energetic style. Backus notes among the genre's many politically charged works to include the Temptations song "War" (1970), the LPs of Gil Scott-Heron, and the O'Jays' "Rich Get Richer" (from the 1975 album Survival).

=== Mainstream success and decline ===
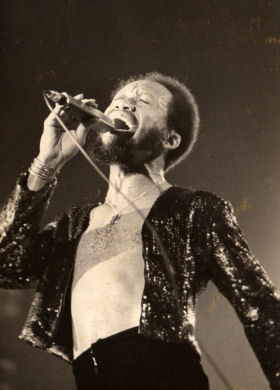
Maurice White, frontman for Earth, Wind & Fire, 1975

Sly Stone was "the first superstar" of progressive soul, according to Billboard journalist Robert Ford, who noted his ability to "pack people into [Madison Square Garden] whenever the mood struck him". In the wake of Sly and the Family Stone's politicized and pessimistic hit album There's a Riot Goin' On (1971), a wave of similarly fashioned soul songs began to dominate the radio. By the release of the band's 1973 LP Fresh (featuring the million-seller "If You Want Me to Stay"), Vernon Gibbs of Crawdaddy! had proclaimed Stone "the founder of progressive soul".

Also hugely popular, Wonder and Gaye's progressive soul albums sold millions of copies during the 1970s. Wonder's series of albums in particular were conceived with high artistic aspirations and proved much celebrated, winning the musician many Grammy Awards and transforming his career. Gaye's What's Going On eventually proved among the most acclaimed albums in history, and Earth, Wind & Fire's That's the Way of the World (with the help of its hit single "Shining Star") was among the most successful black-music records at the time, leading album sales for 1975 with more than 1.1 million copies.

Progressive soul's name and rise in the mainstream were both reported in 1975 by Billboard and Broadcasting magazine, which said the "relatively new" genre was impacting pop radio across the US and reaching "an ever-broader audience". The latter magazine cited the commercial breakthroughs of Earth, Wind & Fire and the Blackbyrds (with their radio hit "Walking in Rhythm"). The continued success of the O'Jays with their hit "For the Love of Money" (1974) was also discussed, with Gamble and Huff's production highlighted for the use of "voice phasing and a variety of electronic effects that rival some space rock efforts by white musicians". According to Stereo Review's Phyl Garland, Earth, Wind & Fire was "the leading exponent of progressive soul" through the end of the decade.

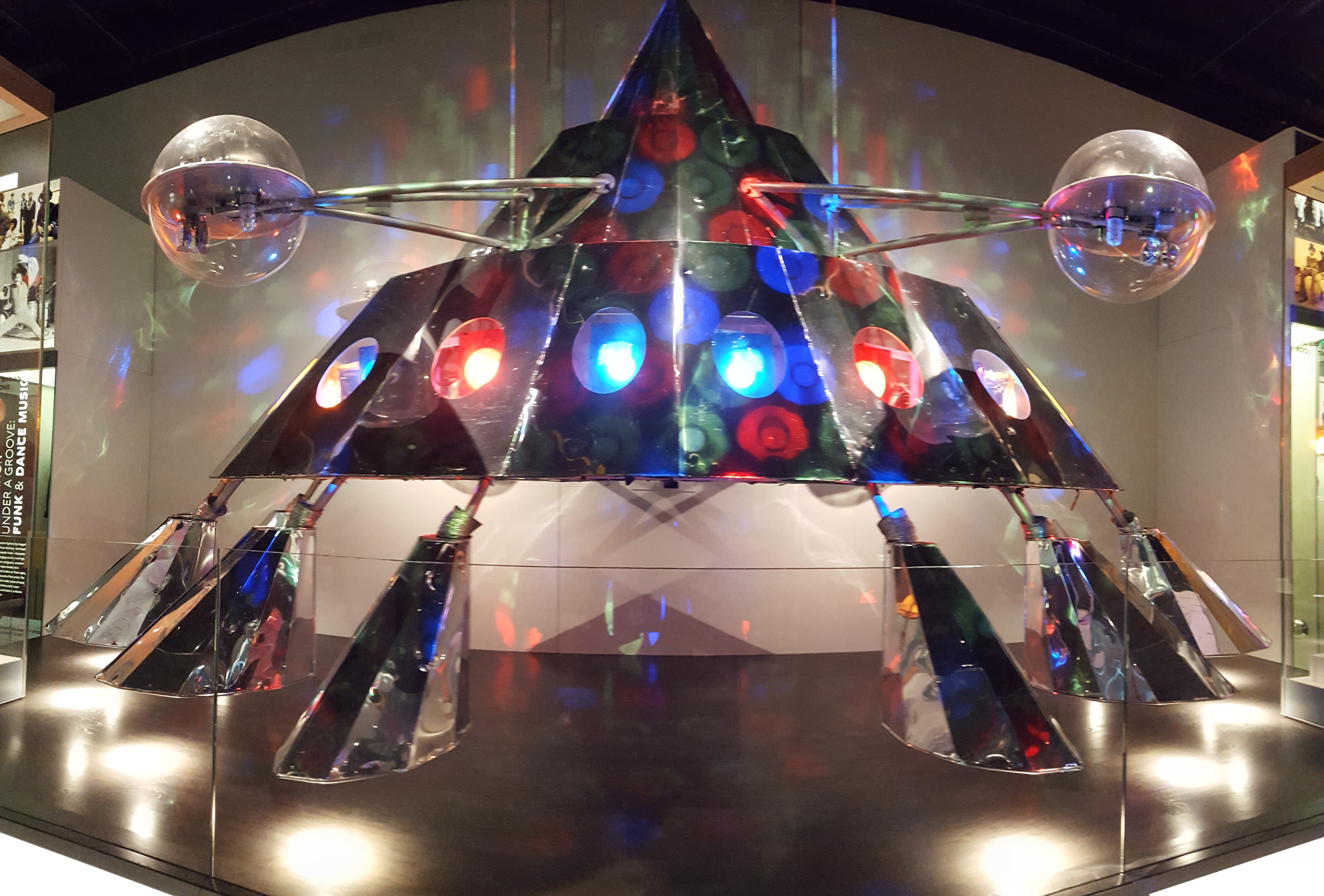
The P-Funk Mothership, preserved at the National Museum of African American History and Culture in Washington, D.C.

Clinton's Parliament-Funkadelic collective achieved a corresponding success as a concert attraction, selling out large arenas and auditoriums while performing in sprawling fashion, with musicians dressed in eccentric costumes. As Keister chronicles, by the mid-1970s, Clinton had conceived an "elaborate stage show designed for his touring group called P-Funk, presenting his dual projects as a single, collective entity"; he "ruled over several dozen musicians in a tour that resembled a Broadway show, with a sizable budget from Casablanca Records that he never would have imagined just a few years earlier when his touring musicians were forced to improvise costumes out of garment bags from the dry cleaners". The P-Funk Earth Tour concerts climaxed with the highly popular conceit of a spacecraft-like prop (the P-Funk Mothership) landing on stage and Clinton strutting down its ramp to greet the live audience as his alter ego, Dr. Funkenstein (who resembled a flamboyantly dressed, extraterrestrial pimp).

In February 1975, Parliament-Funkadelic played a co-billed show with Ohio Players and Graham Central Station at New York City's Radio City Music Hall. Reporting on the concert for The New York Times, Ian Dove said that all three groups represented "a fair cross section of the progressive soul genre", while adding that soul in general had become "the trendy rage in discotheques". The original wave of progressive soul was "short-lived", however, with Himes noting its decline by the late 1970s. In Mayfield's case, he withdrew from public life after a series of lawsuits and poorly received disco albums. Parliament-Funkadelic also fell into disarray with mismanagement of its various musical projects, drug abuse among many of its members, and Clinton's professional disputes with their record label, culminating in the end of the collective's original run by 1981. Stone suffered a similar fate, as legal and drug issues interfered with his productivity and presence in the music industry throughout the late 1970s and 1980s.

=== Revivals ===
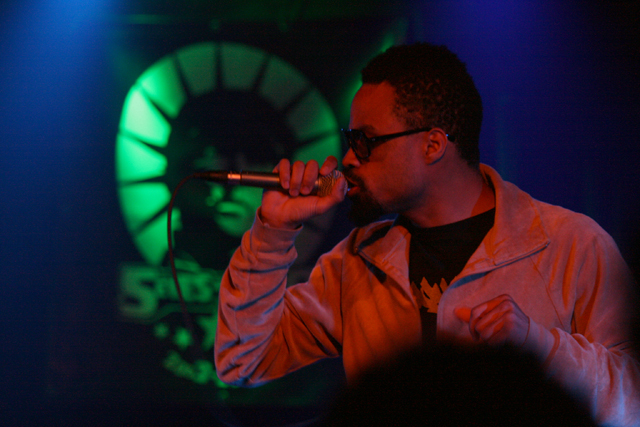
Bilal, a progressive soul singer-songwriter, in 2008

During the 1980s, artists who made recordings in the genre included Prince, Peter Gabriel, Sade, JoBoxers, and Fine Young Cannibals. The latter three groups are cited by Himes as spearheading the movement's rebirth in the UK, which other acts like Kane Gang and the Housemartins would join by 1988. However, in a piece for The Washington Post the following year, he proclaimed that the original movement's expansion of R&B's "musical and lyrical boundaries" remained unrivalled.

By 1990, younger American artists were renewing the progressive-soul tradition. These included Chris Thomas King, Terence Trent D'Arby, Lenny Kravitz, Tony! Toni! Toné!, and After 7. More emerged as the decade ensued, including the British singers Seal and Des'ree, and Americans Meshell Ndegeocello and Joi. Spin magazine's Tony Green credits the latter two artists with pioneering the prog-soul revival that would peak by the early 2000s.

At the start of the 21st century, the leading artists of progressive soul were the Soulquarians, an experimental black-music collective active from the late 1990s to the early 2000s. Often marketed under the term "neo soul", their members recorded collectively at New York's Electric Lady Studios and included D'Angelo, James Poyser, Q-Tip, J Dilla, Erykah Badu, and Raphael Saadiq (formerly of Tony! Toni! Toné!). Himes, who cites Bilal, Jill Scott, and the Roots as a Philadelphia-based correlative within this collective, adds that they took "the progressive-soul tradition of Marvin Gaye, Curtis Mayfield and Prince and [gave] it a hip-hop twist". The commercial success of artists marketed as neo soul, such as Scott, Badu, and Maxwell, helped lend the genre credence as the modern manifestation of progressive soul in both mainstream and subcultural milieus through the 2000s.

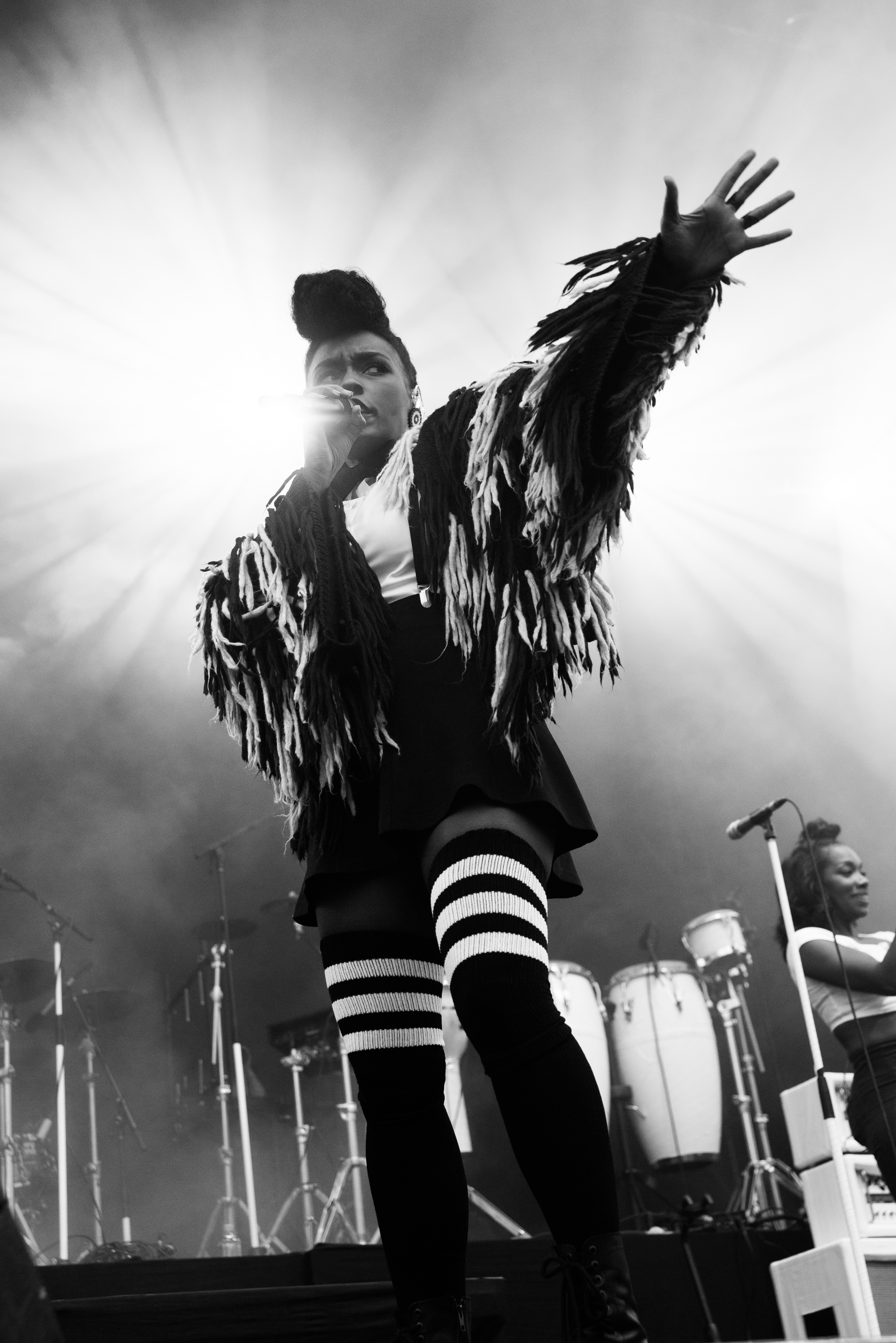
Janelle Monáe (2016), noted for her multi-genre, Afrofuturist works

While having debuted with a popular R&B single for a major label, Bilal soon turned more to progressive soul and jazz performance, recording albums like Love for Sale (which alienated his label and went unreleased) and Airtight's Revenge (released in 2010 on an independent label). In discussing the latter work, Exclaim! journalist David Dacks says the singer's variant of soul is "utterly contemporary, meaning it's a mix of everything that's come before while adding a raft of futuristic sonic touches. At its heart is the classic, album-oriented prog soul of the '70s, with a strong, jazzy undercurrent, but it's much more than that. Bilal's reedy, Sly-meets-Prince voice runs down metaphysical and personal subjects overtop a continuously changing musical landscape ..." According to the music journalist Chris Campbell, Q-Tip (through his group work in A Tribe Called Quest, his own solo career, and other productions) "introduced a form of jazz sampling and bohemian chic that heavily influenced the neo-soul and progressive soul movements".

Along with Bilal, prog-soul singer-songwriters in the 21st century have included Dwele, Anthony David, and Janelle Monáe. Monáe's work features Afrofuturist aesthetics and science fiction concepts, including narratives written around the android persona Cindi Mayweather, described by PopMatters critic Robert Loss as "a mechanical construction composed for the usefulness of others". Loss adds that her use of various genres, both individually and in combination with each other, "serves a progressive ideology" and acts as "a response to W. E. B. Du Bois' critical notion of 'double consciousness', wherein the African American is constantly aware of self and the self as seen by whites". Saadiq's 2011 prog-soul album Stone Rollin' prominently utilizes the Mellotron, an old-fashioned keyboard most often played in progressive and psychedelic rock, and evoking what AllMusic's Andy Kellman describes as "diseased flutes and wheezing strings". Alicia Keys performs in a similar form of soul as Monáe on the 2020 song "Truth Without Love" (from the album Alicia), described by Mojo magazine's James McNair as "astro-soul". Writing in 2021, Gigwise critic Lucy Wynne remarks that progressive soul is "very on-trend at the moment", noting the Leon Bridges album Gold-Diggers Sound in particular.

== See also ==
- Album era
- Cultural impact of the Beatles
- Grammy Award for Best Progressive R&B Album
- P-Funk mythology
- Philadelphia soul
- Progressive rap
- Psychedelic funk
- Alternative R&B
- African-American music
- Plastic soul

== Bibliography ==
- Anon. (1975). "Black Music: Progressing in Sound". Broadcasting – via Google Books.
- Anon. (July 1, 2010). "AllMusic Loves 1971". AllMusic.
- Bilal (September 30, 2010). "Jazz and Soul Singer Bilal Oliver". The Sound of Young America (Podcast). No. 143. Interviewed by Jesse Thorn. Maximum Fun.
- Backus, Rob (1976). Fire Music: A Political History of Jazz. Vanguard Books. ISBN 9780917702006.
- Bogdanov, Vladimir; Woodstra, Chris; Erlewine, Stephen Thomas, eds. (2001). All Music Guide: The Definitive Guide to Popular Music. Backbeat Books/All Media Guide. ISBN 9780879306274.
- Boller, Jay (November 30, 2016). "The week's 29 best concerts: Nov. 30-Dec. 6". City Pages. Archived from the original on November 30, 2016.
- Campbell, Chris (May 17, 2021). "Iconic Producer and Rapper Q-Tip Blurs Genre Lines to Push Hip-Hop Forward". WDET.
- Cochrane, Naima (March 26, 2020). "2000: A Soul Odyssey". Billboard.
- Dacks, David (September 21, 2010). "Bilal Airtight's Revenge". Exclaim!.
- di Leonardo, Micaela (2019). Black Radio/Black Resistance: The Life & Times of the Tom Joyner Morning Show. Oxford University Press. ISBN 978-0190870201.
- Dove, Ian (February 15, 1975). "Three Soul Groups Sing at Music Hall". The New York Times.
- Easlea, Daryl (2018). "18: The Tremble in the Hips: So". Without Frontiers: The Life & Music of Peter Gabriel (Revised and Updated ed.). Omnibus Press. ISBN 978-1-787-59082-3.
- Farley, Christopher John (2002). Aaliyah: More Than a Woman. Simon & Schuster. ISBN 0-7434-5566-5.
- Ford, Robert (February 15, 1975). "Talent in Action – Sly and the Family Stone, Kool and the Gang (Radio City Music Hall, New York)". Billboard.
- Garland, Phyl (May 1979). "Phyl Garland's Basic Library of Rhythm-and-Blues". Stereo Review. pp. 72–77.
- Glickman, Simon (1992). "Sly Stone". In Rubiner, Julia M. (ed.). Contemporary Musicians: Profiles of the People in Music. Vol. 8. Gale Research. ISBN 0-8103-5403-9.
- Gourley, John (January 17, 2012). "John Gourley. The Man". Cool Accidents. Archived from the original on February 1, 2021.
- Green, Tony (March 2002). "Joi: Star Kity's Revenge (Universal)". Spin – via Google Books.
- Gulla, Bob (2008). Icons of R & B and Soul: An Encyclopedia of the Artists who Revolutionized Rhythm, Volume 1. ABC-CLIO. ISBN 978-0313340444.
- Himes, Geoffrey (January 13, 1988). "U.S. Soul, Reborn in Britain". The Washington Post.
- Himes, Geoffrey (August 29, 1989). "Curtis Mayfield". The Washington Post.
- Himes, Geoffrey (May 16, 1990). "Records". The Washington Post.
- Himes, Geoffrey (October 28, 1994). "Two Who Revive Progressive Soul". The Washington Post.
- Himes, Geoffrey (October 12, 2011). "Bilal '1st Born Second'". The Washington Post.
- Himes, Geoffrey (October 31, 2013). "The Curmudgeon: Black Bohemian Music from Sly to Prince to Janelle Monáe". Paste. Archived from the original on August 7, 2020.
- Hoard, Christian; Brackett, Nathan, eds. (2004). The New Rolling Stone Album Guide. Simon & Schuster. ISBN 9780743201698.
- Holsey, Steve (January 1978). "On the Record". Sepia. Vol. 27.
- Hopkins, Scott (May 14, 2020). "The Temptations' Masterpieces". MusicFestNews. Archived from the original on August 14, 2020.
- Keister, Jay; Sheinbaum, John J; Smith, Jeremy L. (2019). "American Progressives of the 1970s: A Colloquy" (PDF). The American Music Research Center Journal. 28: 1–3 – via colorado.edu.
- Keister, Jay (2019). "Black Prog: Soul, Funk, Intellect and the Progressive Side of Black Music of the 1970s" (PDF). American Music Research Center Journal. 28: 5–22 – via colorado.edu.
- Kellman, Andy (n.d.). "Stone Rollin' – Raphael Saadiq". AllMusic.
- Kendall, Jo (May 5, 2019). "Record Collection". Prog – via PressReader.
- Kot, Greg (April 27, 2018). "Janelle Monae comes back down to earth on 'Dirty Computer'". Chicago Tribune.
- Lindsey, Craig D. (February 25, 2013). "Bilal's New A Love Surreal Was Inspired by Salvador Dali". The Village Voice. Archived from the original on July 20, 2020.
- Loss, Robert (October 28, 2013). "Power Up: Janelle Monáe, Afrofuturism, and Plurality". PopMatters.
- Martin, Bill (1998). Listening to the Future: The Time of Progressive Rock. Open Court. ISBN 0-8126-9368-X.
- Martin, Bill (2015). Avant Rock: Experimental Music from the Beatles to Bjork. Open Court. ISBN 9780812699395.
- McCann, Ian (September 8, 2019). "70s Motown Albums You Need To Know: Overlooked Soul Classics Rediscovered". uDiscover.
- McNair, James (November 2020). "Alicia Keys – Alicia". Mojo.
- Moskowitz, David V., ed. (2015). The 100 Greatest Bands of All Time: A Guide to the Legends Who Rocked the World. ABC-CLIO. ISBN 9781440803406.
- Planer, Lindsay (n.d.). "Black Moses – Isaac Hayes". AllMusic.
- Politis, John (Winter 1983). "Rock Music's Place in the Library". Drexel Library Quarterly. 19: 78–92.
- Ross, Sean (May 8, 1999). "After a False Start, The Neo-Soul Genre Picks Up Steam on the Mainstream Track". Billboard – via Google Books.
- rtmsholsey (February 24, 2010). "Neo-Soul: The Complete Story". Michigan Chronicle. Archived from the original on January 29, 2021.
- Strong, Martin Charles; Griffin, Brendon (2008). Lights, Camera, Soundtracks. Canongate. ISBN 9781847670038.
- Warren, Bruce (February 20, 2012). "R.I.P. Stephen 'Steve' Leon, Host of 'My Father's Son' on WDAS (Circa 1968)". The Key. xpn.org.
- Wynne, Lucy (July 19, 2021). "Album review: Leon Bridges – Gold-Diggers Sound". Gigwise.
