= The Clones of Dr. Funkenstein =

Studio album by Parliament
- Released: September 20, 1976
- Recorded: 1976
- Studios: United Sound, Detroit, Michigan, and Hollywood Sound, Hollywood, California
- Genre: Funk
- Length: 40:16
- Label: Casablanca
- Producer: George Clinton

Parliament chronology
Mothership Connection (1975)	The Clones of Dr. Funkenstein (1976)	Live: P-Funk Earth Tour (1977)

Professional ratings
Review scores
Source	Rating
AllMusic	4.5/5 stars
Billboard	(favorable)
Christgau's Record Guide	B+
Rolling Stone	5/5 stars

The Clones of Dr. Funkenstein is the fifth album by funk band Parliament, released on September 20, 1976. The album is notable for featuring horn arrangements by ex-James Brown band member Fred Wesley. The album charted at No. 3 on the Billboard R&B Albums chart, No. 20 on the Billboard pop chart, and became Parliament's second album to be certified gold. Two singles were released, "Do That Stuff", which charted at No. 22, and "Dr. Funkenstein", which charted at No. 43.

== Track listing ==
Side One
No.	Title	Writer(s)	Length
1.	"Prelude"	George Clinton, Bernie Worrell	1:40
2.	"Gamin' on Ya"	Clinton, Bootsy Collins, Worrell	3:02
3.	"Dr. Funkenstein" (released as single-Casablanca 875)	Clinton, Collins, Worrell	5:46
4.	"Children of Production"	Clinton, Collins, Worrell	3:57
5.	"Getten' to Know You"	Clinton, Garry Shider	5:20
Total length:			19:45

Side Two
No.	Title	Writer(s)	Length
6.	"Do That Stuff" (released as single-Casablanca 871 and 12" single-Casablanca NBX-871)	George Clinton, Garry Shider, Bernie Worrell	4:47
7.	"Everything Is on the One"	Clinton, Collins, Worrell	3:47
8.	"I've Been Watching You (Move Your Sexy Body)"	Clinton, Shider, Glenn Goins	6:01
9.	"Funkin' for Fun"	Clinton, Shider, Goins	5:56
Total length:			20:31 40:16

== Personnel ==
- Lead vocals - George Clinton (lead in "Prelude", "Dr. Funkenstein"), Calvin Simon, Fuzzy Haskins, Raymond Davis, Grady Thomas, Garry Shider (lead in "Getten' to Know You"), Glenn Goins (lead in "I've Been Watching You", "Funkin' for Fun"), Bootsy Collins
- Horns - Fred Wesley, Maceo Parker, Rick Gardner, Michael Brecker, Randy Brecker
- Bass guitar - Cordell Mosson, Bootsy Collins, Renny Jones
- Guitars - Garry Shider, Michael Hampton, Glen Goins
- Drums and percussion - Jerome Brailey, Bootsy Collins, Gary "Mudbone" Cooper
- Keyboards and synthesizers - Bernie Worrell
- Backing vocals and handclaps - Debbie Edwards, Taka Khan, Gary Cooper

Horn arrangement by Bernie Worrell (tracks 2, 7, 8, 9) and Fred Wesley (tracks 3, 4, 5, 6).

Production

- Produced by George Clinton
- Engineered by Igor Jim Callow, Igor Jim Vitti
- Mastered br Allen Zentz
- Photography by Ron Slenzak
- Art Direction and Design by Chris Whorf/Gribbitt!
