= Live...Capitol Theatre 1978 =

Live album by Parliament-Funkadelic
- Released: November 2017
- Recorded: November 6, 1978
- Genre: Funk
- Length: Disc One-60:04; Disc Two-55:31; Disc Three-73:18
- Label: RoxVox

Parliament-Funkadelic chronology
George Clinton and His Gangsters of Love (2007)	Live...Capitol Theatre 1978 (2017)	Live...Madison Square Garden 1977 (2017)

Live...Capitol Theatre 1978 is a three-CD live album by the American funk band Parliament-Funkadelic. The album was released in the UK in November 2017 by the RoxVox label. The CD features the band performing at the Capitol Theatre in Passaic, New Jersey, on November 6, 1978, during their "One Nation/Anti-Tour". The liner notes feature a transcription of a December 7, 1978 article about Parliament-Funkadelic from Jet magazine.

== Track listing ==
=== Disc One ===
1. James Wesley Jackson's opening monologue > Band intros
2. "Uncle Jam"
3. "Cosmic Slop"
4. "Cholly (Funk Gettin' Ready to Roll)" > "I Got a Thing, You Got a Thing, Everybody's Got a Thing"
5. "Give Up the Funk (Tear the Roof off the Sucker)" > "Night Of The Thumpasorus Peoples"

=== Disc Two ===
1. "Red Hot Mama"
2. "Into You"
3. "Maggot Brain"
4. "Let's Take It to the Stage"
5. "One Nation Under a Groove"

=== Disc Three ===
1. "Mothership Connection (Star Child)" > "Swing Down, Sweet Chariot"
2. "Flash Light"
3. "Standing on the Verge of Getting It On" > Drum solo > "Standing on the Verge of Getting It On" (reprise)
4. "One Nation Under a Groove" (reprise)

== Personnel ==
- Bass: Cordell "Boogie" Mosson, Rodney "Skeet" Curtis
- Guitars: Garry Shider, Michael Hampton
- Drums: Tyrone Lampkin
- Horns: Greg Boyer, Greg Thomas, Bennie Cowan
- Keyboards: Bernie Worrell, Walter "Junie" Morrison
- Vocals: George Clinton, Garry Shider, Ron Ford, Ray Davis, Dawn Silva, Lynn Mabry, James Wesley Jackson, Walter "Junie" Morrison, Jeanette Washington
