= Lonely Island (The Parliaments song) =

"Lonely Island/(You Make Me Wanna) Cry"

Single by The Parliaments
- A-side: "Lonely Island"
- B-side: "(You Make Me Wanna) Cry"
- Released: 1960
- Genre: Doo-wop
- Length: 2:30
- Label: Flipp Records

The Parliaments singles chronology
"Poor Willie" (1958)	"Lonely Island/(You Make Me Wanna) Cry" (1960)	"Heart Trouble" (1965)

"Lonely Island" is the second single released by The Parliaments. It was released in 1960 on the Flipp Record label (FL-45-100).

Like the Parliaments' previous single, Poor Willie/Party Boys, this record highly sought after by P-Funk collectors.

== Production and composition ==
"Lonely Island" was initially recorded for Newark's New Records, but instead it was released the next year on Flipp Record label.

When recording the song, the Parliaments consisted of George Clinton, Grady Thomas, Calvin Simon, and Charles "Butch" Davis. Johnny Murray guested as the lead vocalist on "Lonely Island", while George Clinton performed the lead vocals on the "(You Make Me Wanna) Cry". The vocal harmonies on "Lonely Island" are accompanied by an organ.

The B-side of the single contains "(You Make Me Wanna) Cry", which was described as "uptempo gospel-pumping steam-whoop".
