= Connections & Disconnections =

Studio album by Funkadelic
- Released: 1980 (Germany); March 1981
- Studios: Wally Heider, San Francisco, California
- Genre: Funk
- Length: 40:13
- Label: LAX
- Producers: Greg Errico, Fuzzy Haskins, Calvin Simon, Grady Thomas

Funkadelic chronology
Uncle Jam Wants You (1979)	Connections & Disconnections (1980)	The Electric Spanking of War Babies (1981)

Singles from Connections and Disconnections
- 1. "Connections and Disconnections" Released: 1981

Professional ratings
Review scores
Source	Rating
AllMusic	1/5 stars
Robert Christgau	C

Connections & Disconnections is an album recorded by Fuzzy Haskins, Calvin Simon, and Grady Thomas under the name Funkadelic.

With the history of financial disputes with Clinton behind them, and backing from Westbound Records founder Armen Boladian, this album (co-produced by former Sly and the Family Stone drummer Greg Errico, without the involvement of George Clinton) was released in Germany in 1980 entitled 42.9%, and in the United States in 1981 entitled Connections & Disconnections. It was reissued by Rhino Records in 1992 with the title Who's a Funkadelic? The competing release challenged George Clinton's claim to ownership of the "Funkadelic" name, ultimately leading to a lawsuit between the trio and Clinton.

== Significance ==
Due to the combination of several factors, by the end of the 1970s, the Parliament-Funkadelic enterprise was starting to crumble. Dissatisfaction with George Clinton's style of financial management led to the departure of additional key members Bernie Worrell, "Billy Bass" Nelson, Glenn Goins and Jerome Brailey. Haskins, Simon, and Thomas (along with Clinton and bass vocalist Ray Davis) had been members of the Parliaments since the band's inception in the mid-1950s. Throughout the 1960s and into the 1970s, they (Haskins, Simon, and Thomas) felt increasingly marginalized by the influx of new P-Funk musicians, and in 1977, refused to sign a Backstage Management contract requiring them to relinquish all rights to the names Parliament and Funkadelic. Shortly after the trio left Parliament-Funkadelic, they formed their own band, which they also named "Funkadelic," and recorded Connections & Disconnections. Their use of the name Funkadelic resulted in an acrimonious legal dispute with Clinton's organization, and is rumored to have contributed to accelerating the disintegration of Parliament-Funkadelic.

== Track listing ==
Sine one
No.	Title	Writer(s)	Length
1.	"Phunklords"	Haskins, Mims, Simon, Thomas, Powers	5:33
2.	"You'll Like It Too"	Haskins, Simon, Thomas, Williams, McEvoy	4:28
3.	"The Witch Shade I: The Proclafunktion"	Haskins, Jackson, Simon, Thomas, Drake	2:48
4.	"The Witch Shade II: The Infunktation"	Haskins, Jackson, Simon, Thomas, Drake	4:13
5.	"The Witch Shade III: The Celefunktion"	Haskins, Jackson, Simon, Thomas, Drake	2:29
Total length:			19:31

Side two
No.	Title	Writer(s)	Length
6.	"Connections and Disconnections"	Geter, Haskins, Mims, Simon, Thomas	5:00
7.	"Come Back"	Haskins, Simon, Thomas, Mims, Powers	4:44
8.	"Call the Doctor"	Drake, Haskins, Mims, Simon, Thomas	5:12
9.	"Who's a Funkadelic"	Haskins, Mims, Simon, Thomas	5:46
Total length:			20:42 40:13

== Personnel ==
- Fuzzy Haskins – vocals and percussion
- Calvin Simon – vocals and percussion
- Grady Thomas – vocals and percussion
- Michael Williams – keyboards, guitar and vocals
- Billy Mims – clavinet, guitar, vocals
- Ben Powers Jr – drums, bass and vocals
- John Quad Wiley – keyboards and vocals
- Stan Thorn – keyboards
- Ken Blackmon – bass
- Thomas "Pae-dog" McEvoy – jazz horn
- Dede Dickerson – background musician
- Ngoh Spencer – background musician
- Vicky Randal – background musician
- Betty Jo Drake – background vocals
