= Radio Active (Fuzzy Haskins album) =

Studio album by Fuzzy Haskins
- Released: 1978
- Recorded: 1978
- Genre: R&B, soul, funk
- Label: Westbound
- Producer: GIG Productions

Fuzzy Haskins chronology
A Whole Nother Thang (1976)	Radio Active (1978)	A Whole Nother Radio Active Thang (1994)

Radio Active is the second album by Parliament-Funkadelic vocalist Clarence "Fuzzy" Haskins. It was released by Westbound Records in 1978 and was produced by GIG productions. The album features numerous P-Funk musicians including Garry Shider, Bernie Worrell, and Jerome Brailey.

In 1994, the album was reissued along with its predecessor A Whole Nother Thang on a single CD entitled A Whole Nother Radio Active Thang (Westbound CDSEWD 099), which also featured the previously unreleased bonus track "Right Back Where I Started From".

== Track listing ==
1. "Not Yet" (Clarence Haskins) (released as a single-Westbound WT34716 and 12" single-Westbound DSKO 107)
2. "I Think I Got My Thang Together" (Haskins) (released as the b-side to "Not Yet")
3. "This Situation Called Love" (Glenn Goins)
4. "Gimme Back (Some of the Love You Got from Me)" (Haskins)
5. "Things We Used to Do" (Haskins)
6. "Woman" (Haskins)
7. "Sinderilla" (Haskins)
8. "Silent Day" (Haskins, Cordell Mosson)

== Personnel ==
- Cordell Mosson
- Glenn Goins
- Garry Shider
- Bernie Worrell
- Bruce Nazarian
- Michael Hampton
- Gary Schunk
- Jerry Paul Podgajski
- Jerome Brailey
- Brandye
- Tim Ryan
- Dennis Coffey
