= Fertitta Center =

Multi-purpose arena in Houston, Texas

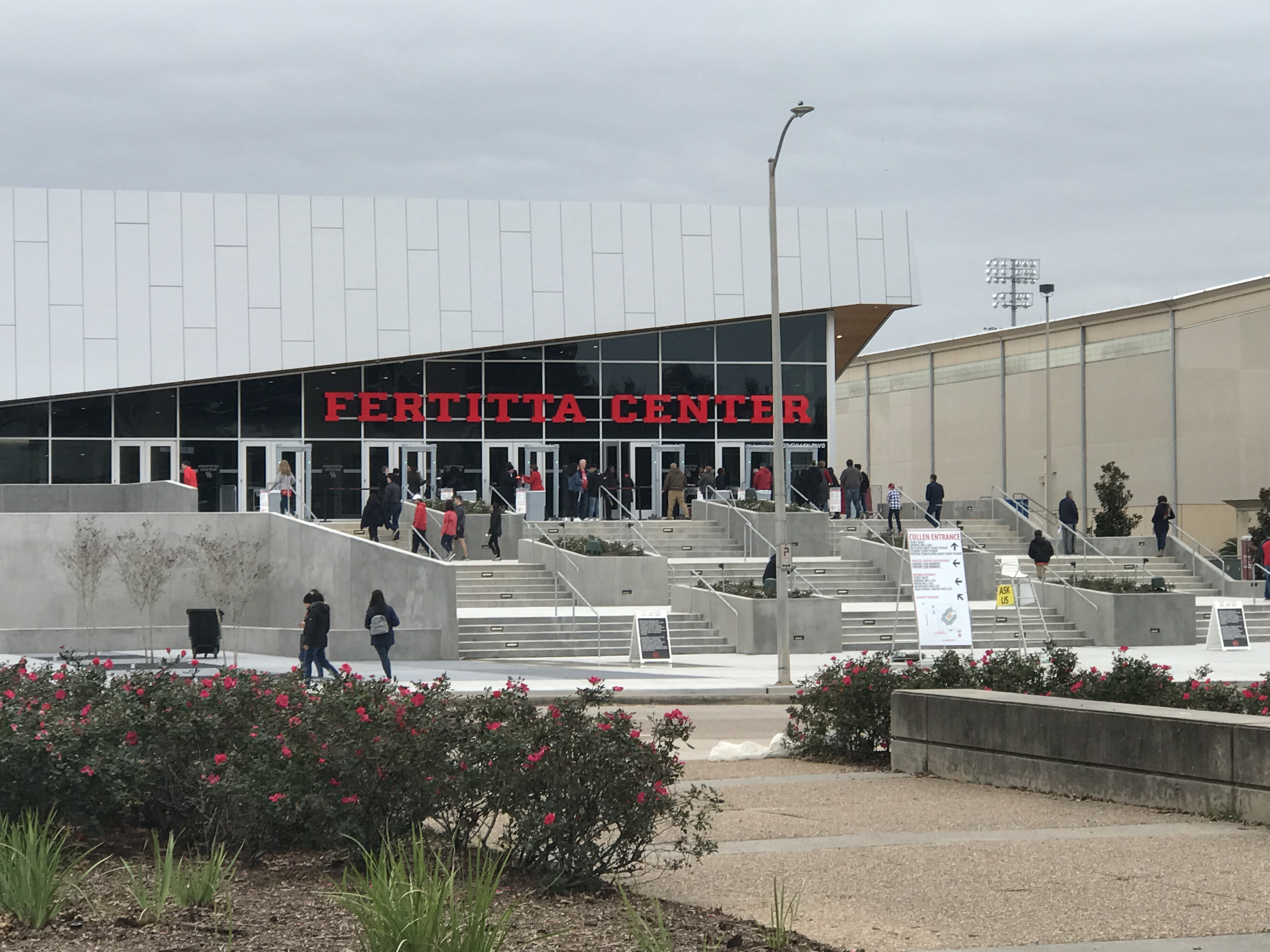
- The exterior of the Fertitta Center on Cullen Boulevard
- Interactive map of Fertitta Center
- Former names: Hofheinz Pavilion (1969–2017)
- Address: 3875 Holman Street
- Location: Houston, Texas, U.S.
- Coordinates: 29°43′29″N 95°20′49″W
- Owner: University of Houston
- Operator: University of Houston
- Capacity: 7,035 (2018–present); 8,479 (1998–2017); 10,000 (1969–1998)
- Record attendance: 7,933 (post-2017 capacity); 8,918 (post-1998 capacity); 10,660 (pre-1998 capacity)

Construction
- Groundbreaking: 1967
- Opened: December 1, 1969
- Renovated: 1991, 1992, 1998, 2004, 2017
- Cost: $4.2 million ($36.9 million in 2025 dollars) $60 million (2017 renovation)
- Architects: Lloyd, Morgan & Jones
- Structural engineer: Walter P Moore
- General contractors: H. A. Lott, Inc.

Tenants
- Houston Cougars (NCAA DI) (1969–present); Houston Rockets (NBA) (1971–1975)

Website
- uh.edu/fertitta-center

The Fertitta Center, formerly Hofheinz Pavilion, is a 7,035-seat multi-purpose arena on the University of Houston campus in Houston. Opened in 1967 and located at 3875 Holman Street, it is home to the Houston Cougars men's and women's basketball teams and the women's volleyball team.

The arena was originally named after UH alumnus, politician, businessman, and philanthropist Roy "Judge" Hofheinz and his late wife, Irene Cafcalas "Dene" Hofheinz, after they donated $1.5 million to help fund construction. It is now named after restaurant magnate and Houston Rockets owner Tilman Fertitta, another UH alum who donated $20 million toward the complete renovation of the arena in 2016. The court is named for Hall of Fame and former Cougars coach Guy V. Lewis. Like many arenas of its kind, the seating bowl of Fertitta Center is dug into the ground so that one enters the building at the top of the bowl.

In June 2010, the University of Houston announced a $40 million plan to renovate Hofheinz Pavilion. Ultimately in November 2015, the Board of Regents approved a $60 million complete redesign of the facility to open in 2018, with Fertitta bearing a third of the cost. After the Hofheinz family objected to the building's being renamed, the school and the family reached a settlement to honor Judge Hofheinz by building a plaza containing a bronze statue of him near the facility and dedicating an alcove within to him. In addition, the UH library archived Hofheinz's historical records in a special section. Finally, UH petitioned the city of Houston to change the name of Holman Street between Cullen Boulevard and Scott Street to honor the Hofheinz family. The renovation began in March 2017 at the conclusion of the 2016–17 basketball seasons, and was scheduled to be completed in time for the 2018–19 men's and women's basketball seasons, but construction delays pushed the reopening date to December 1, 2018. Both basketball teams played their home games on the campus of nearby Texas Southern University during the course of construction.

The Houston Rockets of the National Basketball Association (NBA) used the arena as their first home in Houston, from 1971 to 1975. In addition to athletics, the arena has been used for other purposes such as UH graduation ceremonies and area high school commencements. It has also hosted many concerts by famous artists. The Summit took over for much of these purposes in the city after its construction in 1975.

== Hofheinz Pavilion (1969–2017) ==
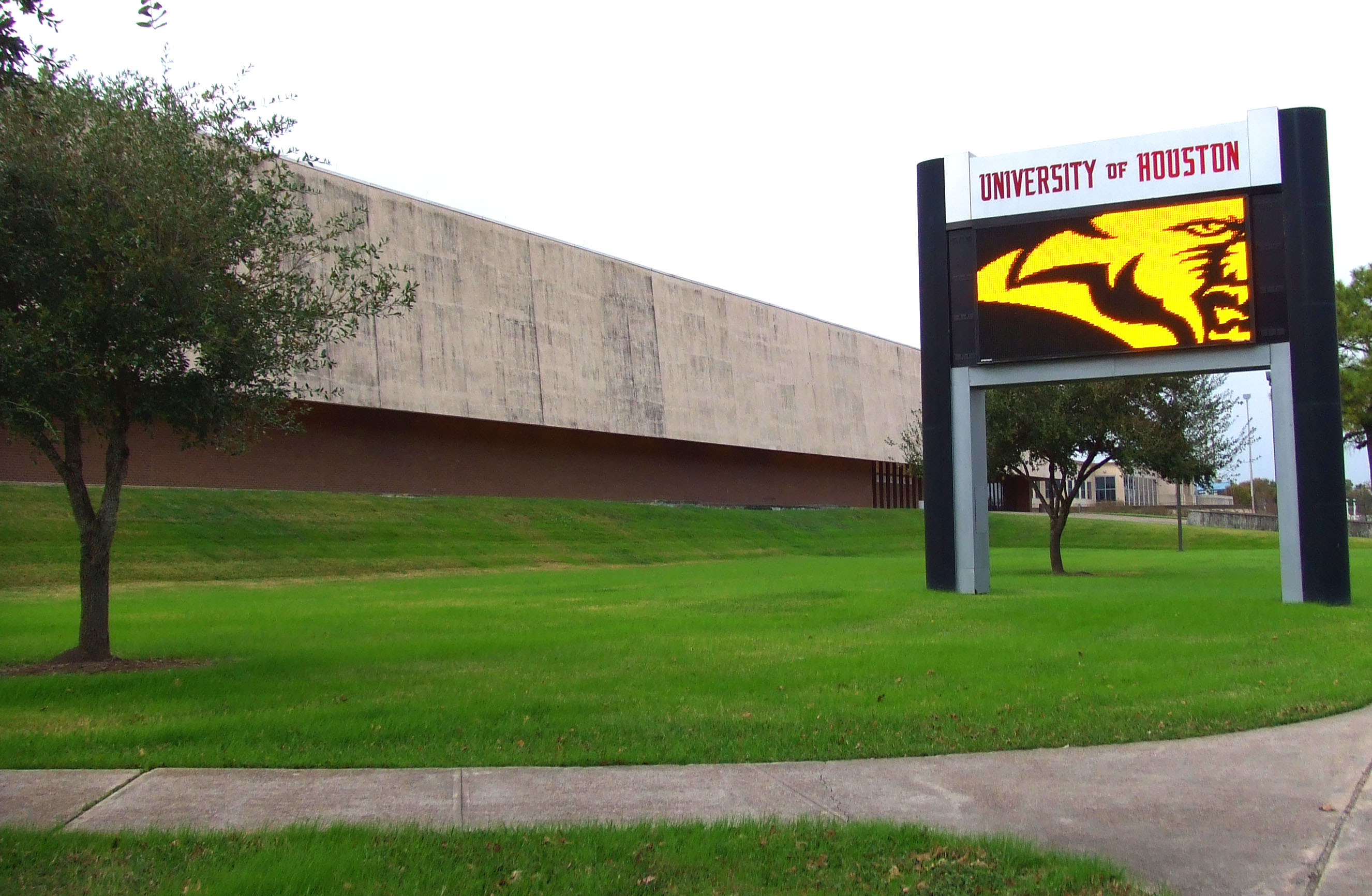
Hofheinz Pavilion in 2007

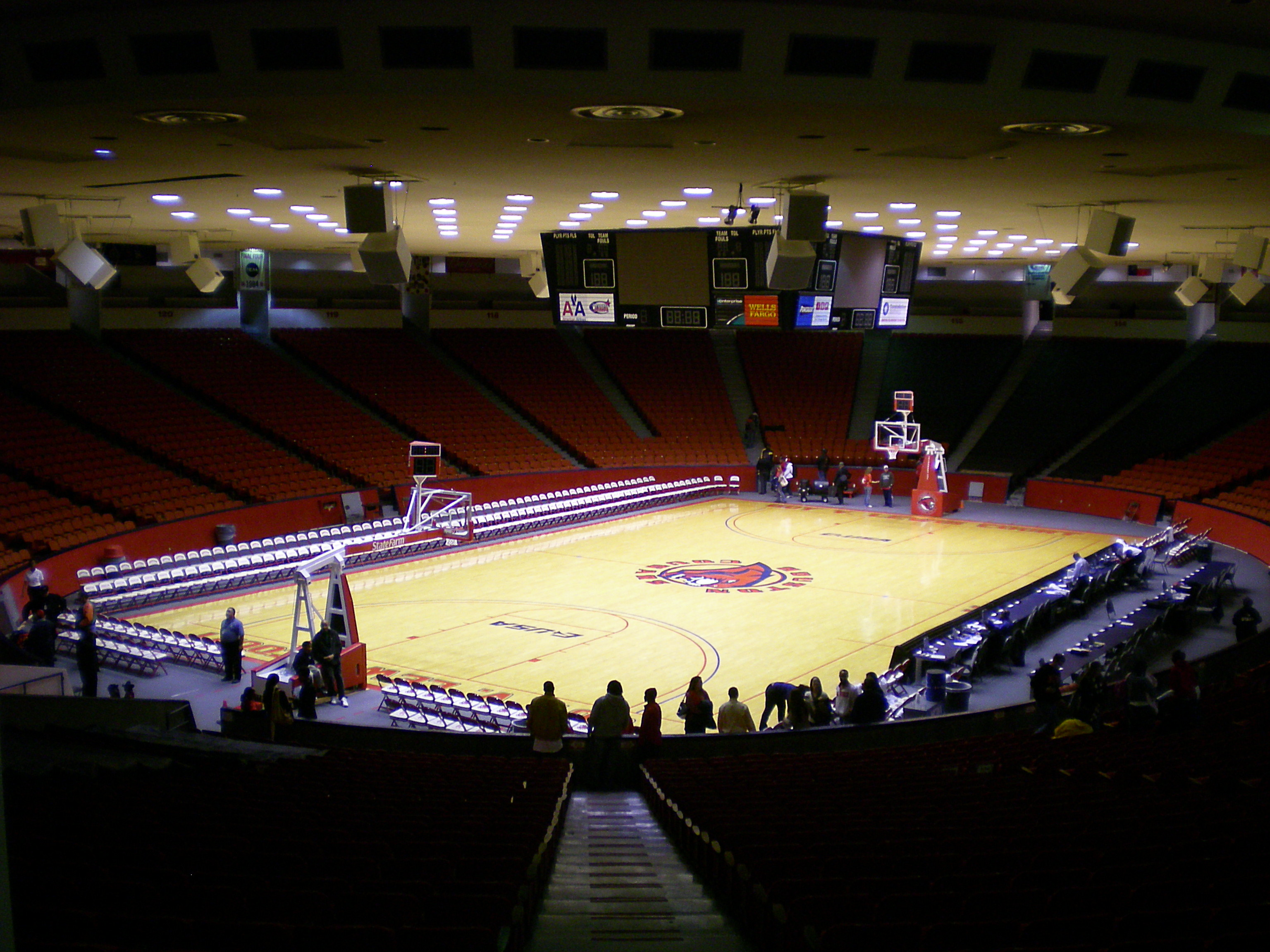
The interior of Hofheinz Pavilion in 2008

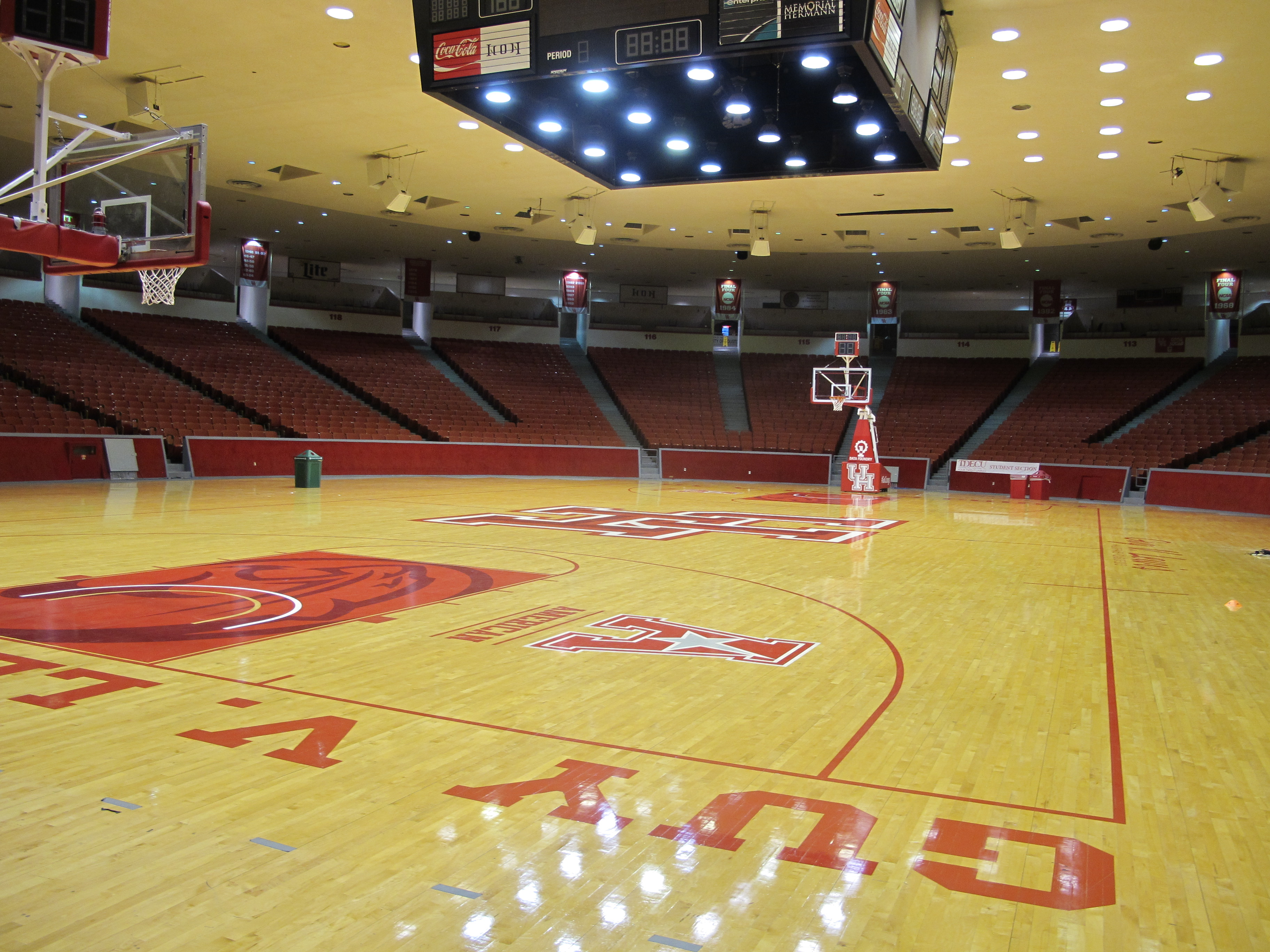
The Hofheinz Pavilion court in 2016

Prior to 1969, the basketball team of the University of Houston hosted their home games at high school arenas such as Jeppesen Gym and Delmar Field House. Hofheinz Pavilion was meant to replace these venues as a permanent location.

The first athletic event at Hofheinz Pavilion was held on December 1, 1969, when the Houston Cougars men's basketball team defeated Southwestern Louisiana 89–72 before a crowd of 7,000.

When the team relocated from San Diego in 1971, the NBA's Houston Rockets used the venue as their home arena, although selected games were played at the Astrodome. The Rockets played at Hofheinz Pavilion during their first four seasons in Houston until the construction of The Summit was completed in 1975.

On March 5, 1990, Hofheinz Pavilion hosted its largest number of spectators to date when a crowd of 10,660 attended a men's basketball game in which Houston beat Texas.

A new ceiling, lighting and sound system were installed in 1991. Through a donation by alumni John and Rebecca Moores in 1992, the basketball locker rooms were enlarged and equipped with personal lockers for each player. Also added was a meeting area and lounge furnished with couches, a color television, a stereo sound system and a pull-down projection screen.

In 1995, the court was renamed to "Guy V. Lewis Court at Hofheinz Pavilion" in honor of College Basketball Hall of Fame coach Guy V. Lewis.

In 1998, Hofheinz Pavilion again underwent a renovation as part of a capital improvement campaign undertaken by the university to upgrade its athletic facilities. In its original format Hofheinz Pavilion had a seating capacity of 10,000. As part of the renovation, a ring of luxury suites was added to the top of the seating bowl. This addition necessitated the removal of 1,500 seats, reducing capacity to 8,479. The new Connor Uni-Force Flooring System was installed in October 2004. In June 2010, the University of Houston announced its intention to undergo a $40 million renovation and expansion to Hofheinz Pavilion after a four-month feasibility study conducted by AECOM. This would mark the largest single financial investment to the arena to that point.

== Renovations ==
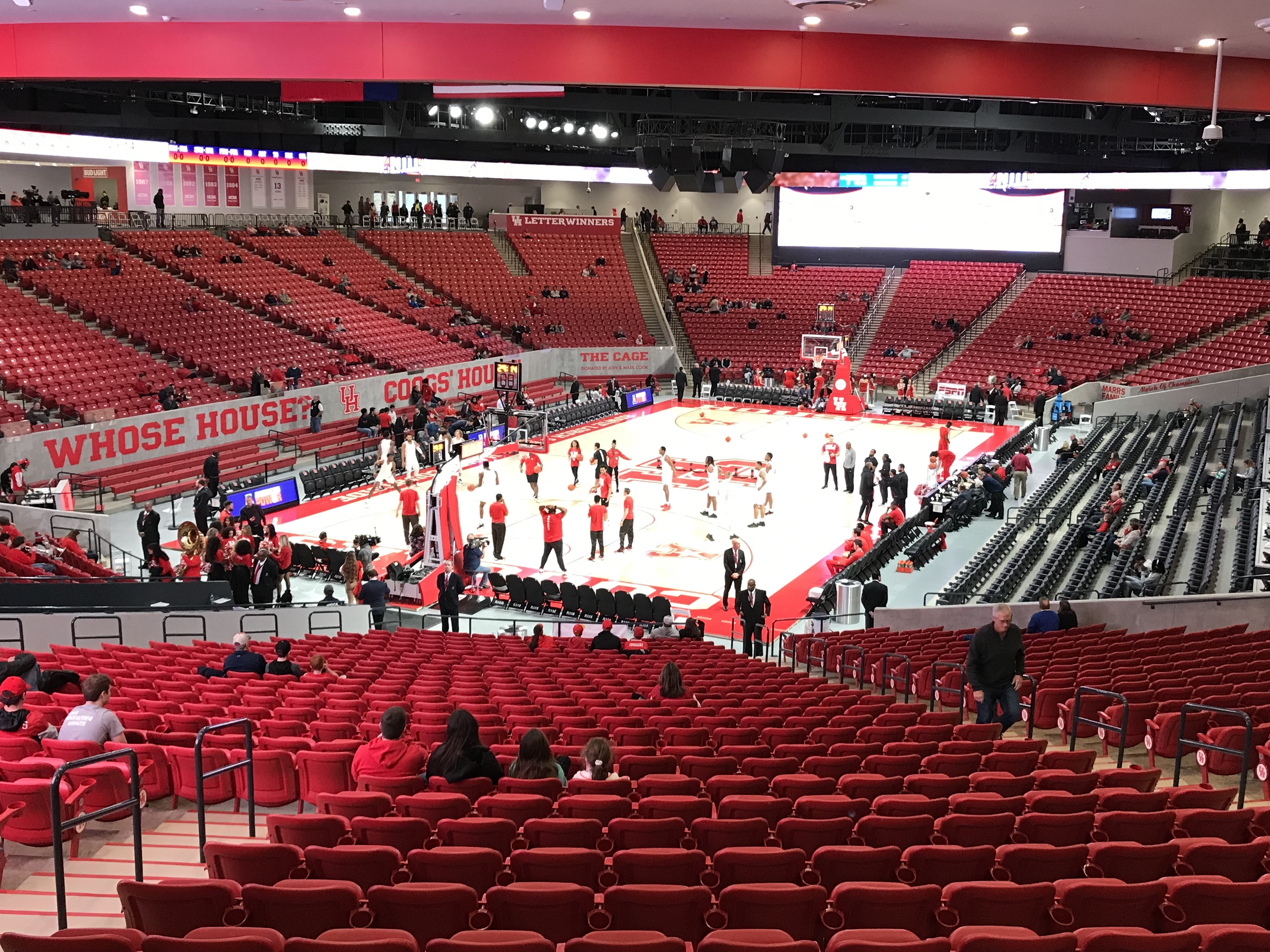
Interior of Fertitta Center, December 2018

Renovations to the facility began in March 2017 at the conclusion of the 2016–17 basketball season to rebuild the 50-year old arena into a modern sports and entertainment facility. The $60 million project was funded primarily by a $20 million donation from Tilman Fertitta, a UH alumnus who is also chairman of the UH board of regents. As part of the project, the interior of the arena was demolished, and a modern seating bowl was built within the existing walls with a reduced capacity of 7,100. Work was scheduled to be completed by the start of the 2018–19 men's and women's basketball seasons; however, construction delays pushed the reopening back to December 1, 2018. During renovations, the building took on water from Hurricane Harvey, which turned the stripped-down arena bowl into a "swimming pool". A red line painted in the visitor's tunnel marks the height of the flood waters during the storm. Both the men's and women's basketball teams played at Health and Physical Education Arena at Texas Southern University during the length of the renovations, which spanned the entire 2017–18 season and the first month of the 2018–19 season.

The newly named Fertitta Center reopened on December 1, 2018, with the men's basketball team beating the then 18th ranked Oregon Ducks 65–61 in a nationally televised game.

== Events ==
=== Concerts ===
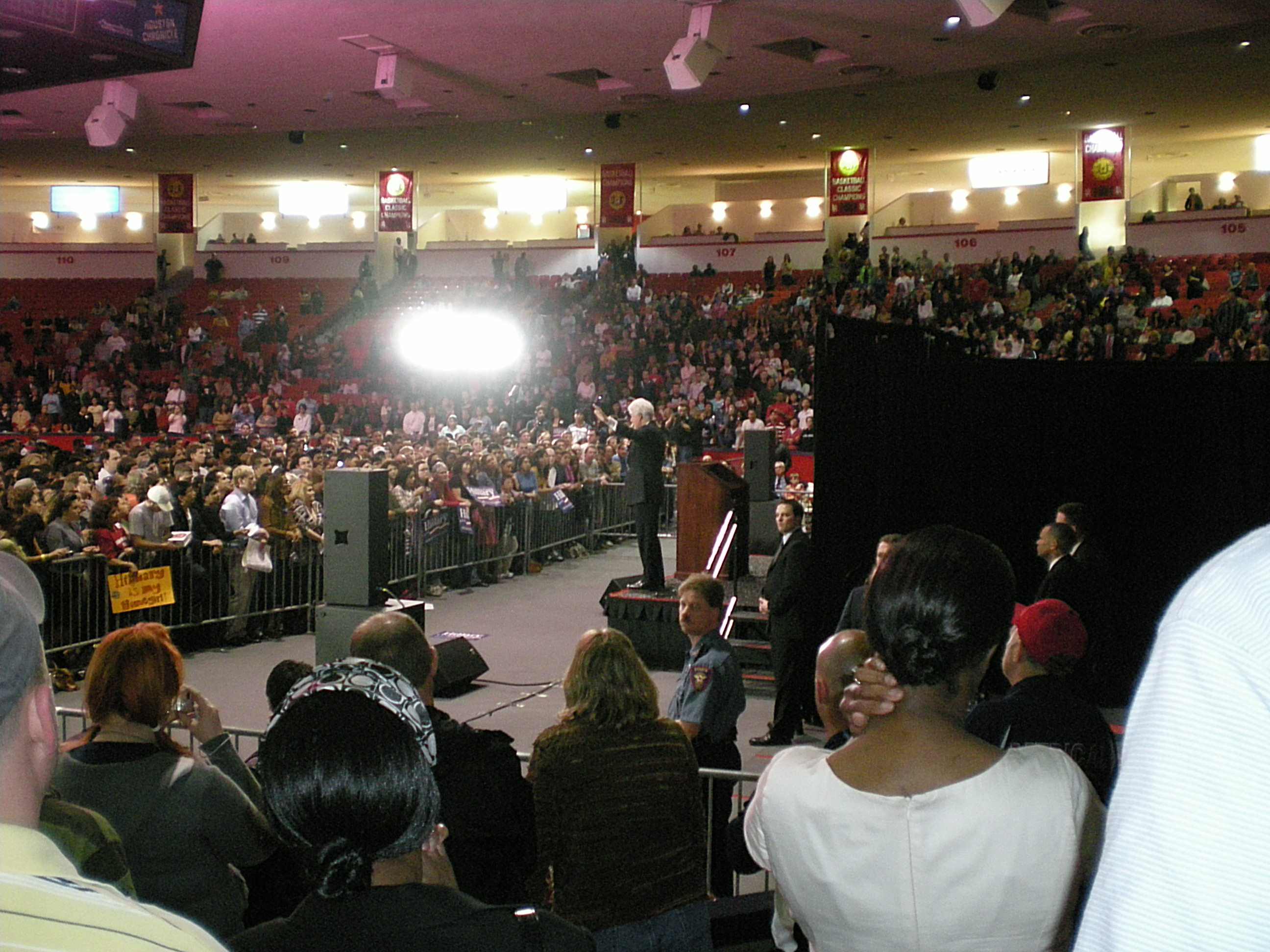
Former U.S. President Bill Clinton speaking at Hofheinz Pavilion during a campaign rally for Hillary Clinton in 2008

Hofheinz Pavilion has hosted Joni Mitchell, George Harrison, Elton John, Faces, Traffic, Jethro Tull, The Clash, Procol Harum, Elvis Presley, Emerson Lake & Palmer, Frank Zappa, Grateful Dead, Led Zeppelin, The Who, The Rolling Stones, The Jackson 5, Alice Cooper, Bob Dylan, The Band, Prince & The New Power Generation, Madonna, Genesis, and Yes.

Nine of the fifteen songs featured in the concert film Ladies and Gentlemen – The Rolling Stones were filmed at Hofheinz Pavilion on June 25, 1972 – 5 from the 4:00 pm show, and 4 from the 9:00 pm show.

On Halloween in 1976, Parliament-Funkadelic, accompanied by opening acts Bootsy's Rubber Band and Sly and the Family Stone brought their P-Funk Earth Tour to the Hofheinz Pavilion. The P-Funk and Bootsy performances were released on VHS in 1986 and on DVD in 1998. They continued to perform sold-out shows at the venue in 1977, 1978, and 1979.

Popular music concerts are still held at the Fertitta Center, often when a major act decides against playing at the larger (and ticketing industry-controlled) venues in town. Houston native David Cook played at Hofheinz Pavilion as part of the 2008 edition of the American Idols Live! Tour. In 2014, a live concert The Grateful Dead played there on November 18, 1972, was released on compact disc and limited-edition vinyl.

=== Other sports ===
In 2019, the Professional Bull Riders' Unleash the Beast Series made their first visit to Fertitta Center; it was the PBR's first event in Houston since 2012 (when they held a Built Ford Tough Series event at NRG Stadium). On August 18, 2021, it hosted a live episode of AEW Dynamite.

== See also ==
- List of NCAA Division I basketball arenas
