= Poor Willie =

Single by The Parliaments
- A-side: "Poor Willie"
- B-side: "Party Boys"
- Released: 1959
- Genre: Doo-wop
- Length: 2:17
- Label: APT Records; 45-25036
- Songwriter(s): Charles Davis; Robert Lambert; Grady Thomas; D. Mitchell; George Clinton

The Parliaments singles chronology
"Poor Willie" (1959)	"Lonely Island" (1960)

"Poor Willie" is the first single recorded commercially by The Parliaments. The single was released in 1959 by APT Records (APT 45-25036), a subsidiary of ABC-Paramount Records. Both songs were written by all of the Parliaments, which by this time consisted of George Clinton, Grady Thomas, Robert Lambert, and Charles Davis. The B-side of the single was entitled "Party Boys".

The record was not a hit, but it has become a collector's item, fetching hundreds of dollars at record conventions and on eBay.
