= P-Funk Mothership =

Fictional space vehicle used by musician George Clinton

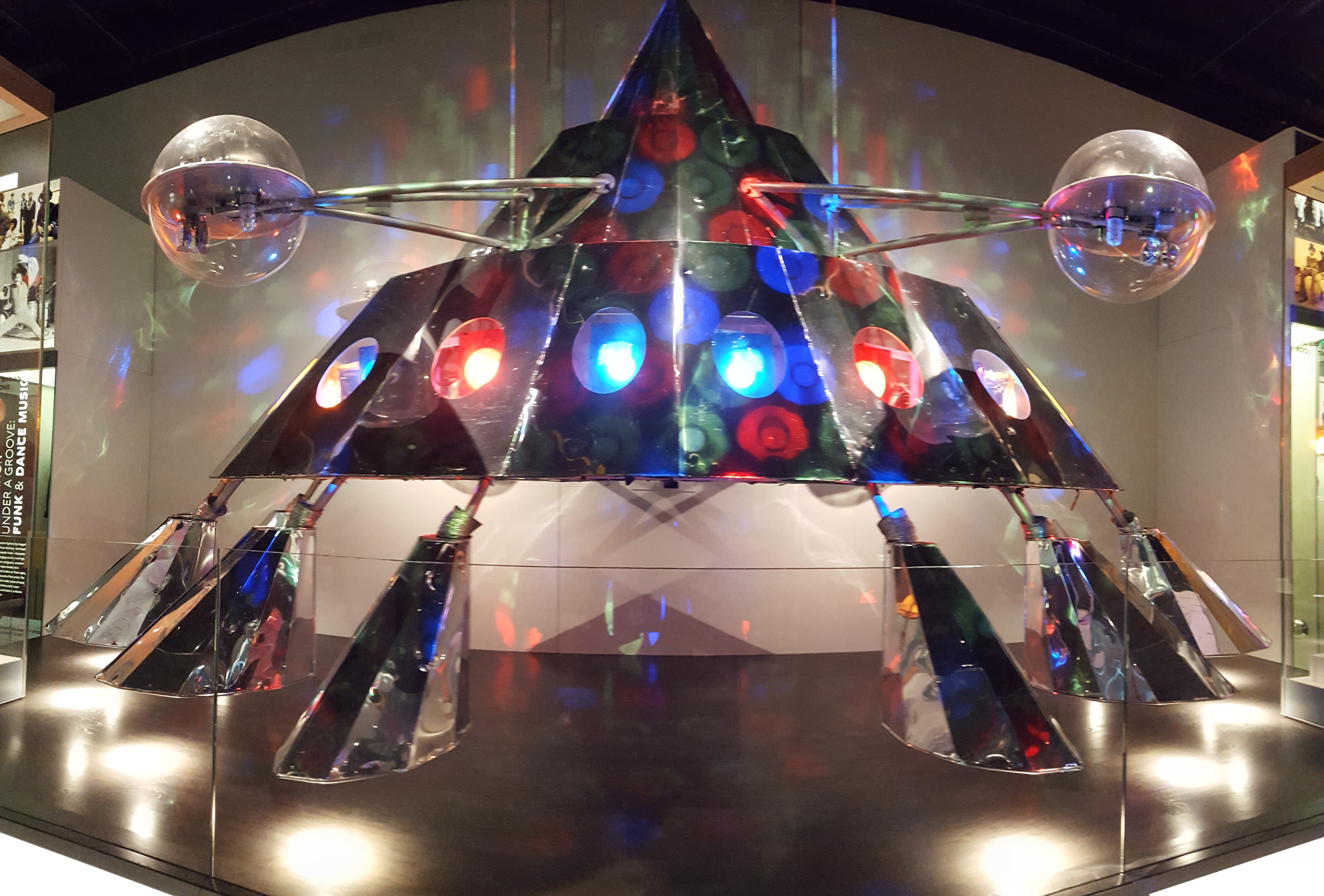
P-Funk Mothership at the National Museum of African American History and Culture in Washington, D.C.

Dr. Funkenstein emerging from the Mothership – 1975 album art

The P Funk Mothership, also known as The Mothership or The Holy Mothership, is a space vehicle model belonging to Dr. Funkenstein, an alter ego of funk musician George Clinton. An integral part of the P-Funk mythology, the Mothership existed conceptually as a fictional vehicle of funk deliverance and as a physical prop central to Parliament-Funkadelic concerts during the 1970s and 1990s.

== Origins ==
During their heyday in the mid to late 1970s, following the success of their platinum-selling album, 1975's Mothership Connection, George Clinton and his band Parliament Funkadelic - the Funk Mob - engaged in a series of high profile, no-expenses-spared stadium tours around the United States, culminating in the famous P Funk Earth Tour.

At these gigs, and starting in October 1976, the much referenced Mothership was seen to land on stage amongst the band and before a baying and expectant crowd. It was designed by Jules Fisher. The Mothership was summoned down by the vocal tones of P Funk singer/guitarists Glenn Goins and later Garry Shider, and was represented in the form of a full-scale model complete with light and sound effects as well as pyrotechnics. At this point in the show George Clinton would emerge from the Mothership in the form of Dr. Funkenstein, the "cool ghoul with the bump transplant," in order to better "administer funk" to the audience.

== Later years and retirement ==
For many years, the landing of the Mothership was only alluded to at live concerts, due to the prohibitive cost of maintaining the elaborate stage-show. After the band had to deal with mounting debt, the Mothership was discarded and sold for cash in 1982 or 1983. Sources say the Washington, D.C. management company sold it to a scrap metal yard in Prince George's County in Maryland.

In 1996, following the release of T.A.P.O.A.F.O.M. (The Awesome Power of a Fully Operational Mothership), George Clinton launched the "Mothership Reconnection Tour" with Bootsy Collins, Bernie Worrell, and the latest incarnation of P Funk, the "P Funk All Stars". The Mothership Reconnection Tour, which began in New York's Central Park, required a reconstruction of the Mothership, and the concerts included the landing of the Mothership, albeit on a smaller scale. Clinton claims the mid-1990s re-build of the 1,200 pound aluminum spacecraft is an indistinguishable replica.

For a few years after the Mothership Reconnection Tour, the Mothership would land periodically at the P Funk All Stars concerts, particularly those at larger venues. One of the last appearances of the Mothership was at Woodstock 1999. The Mothership made a few other appearances during this time, such as Eugene Oregon, before being retired.

The replica Mothership found a new home in 2011 when the Smithsonian Institution acquired it by moving it from Clinton's recording studio in Tallahassee, Florida, after the original could not be located. The concert prop started as a symbol of "what could be" and is now located in the Smithsonian's National Museum of African American History and Culture.

== Replicas ==
In 2021, the Oakland Museum of California constructed a replica of the spacecraft as part of its exhibition, Mothership: Voyage Into Afrofuturism. In its announcement of the exhibit, running from August 7, 2021 to February 27, 2022, the museum said, "Experience a replica of the Mothership itself— musician George Clinton of Parliament Funkadelic’s Afrofuturistic vessel—to relax in an otherworldly video installation, a curated playlist by DJ Spooky, and more."

== See also ==
- Parliament-Funkadelic
- P-Funk mythology
