= Original P =

American funk band (founded 1991)

The Original P is an American funk band formed in 1991 by four founding members of Parliament-Funkadelic. Grady Thomas, Fuzzy Haskins, Calvin Simon, and Ray Davis have all been inducted into the Rock and Roll Hall of Fame and in 2019, were awarded by NARAS the Grammy for Lifetime Achievement.

== Members ==
=== Current members ===
- Grady Thomas – vocals, percussion (1981–present)
- Ben Powers Jr. – drums, bass, percussion (1981–present)
- John "Fly" Wiley – keyboards (1981–present)
- Sonja Holmes – vocals (1991–present)
- Luciana Hall – vocals (1991–present)
- Kevin "K-Star" Shider – lead and rhythm guitar, vocals (2005–present)
- Sharla L. Patrick – keyboards, vocals (2005–present)
- Scott "Skyntyte" Free – lead and rhythm guitar, vocals (2007–present)
- Theophilus Glass – vocals (2014–present)
- Will Montgomery II – keyboards (2018–present)
- Zac Chester – keyboards (2018–present)
- Andre Benjamin – trumpet (2018–present)
- Zdany Chisolm – saxophone (2018–present)

=== Past members ===
- Ray Davis – bass vocal (1991–2005)
- Clarence "Fuzzy" Haskins – first tenor vocal (1981–2012)
- Calvin Simon – second tenor vocal (1981–2007)
- Derrick Davis – bass, vocals (1991–2016)
- Gene Grady Thomas Jr. – lead and rhythm guitar, vocals (1991–2019)
- William "Billy" Mims – guitar (1981–2007)
- Douglas Smith – keyboards, vocals (2005–2007)
- "Peter Keys" Pisarczyk – keyboards (2005–2007)
- Ann Love – vocals (2003–2005)
- George "Paisley" Gordon – guitar (1998–2003)
- Rose Offord – vocals (2007–2009)
- Defiance Douglass – vocals, keyboards (2014–2018)
- Patrice "Emerald" Llewellen – vocals (1991–present)

== Discography ==
- Connections & Disconnections released under the name Funkadelic (LAX Records, 1980)
- What Dat Shakin (Westbound Records, 1998)
- Hyped Up Westbound Soljaz (Westbound Records, 2001)
- Funk Force Trauma (2016)
