= Quazar (album) =

Studio album by Quazar
- Released: 1978
- Recorded: 1978
- Genre: Funk
- Length: 39:34
- Label: Arista
- Producer: Glenn Goins

Quazar is the debut album from the band Quazar. The band was led by former P-Funk vocalist Glenn Goins, who also served as the producer and arranger of the album. Goins died before the album was completed, effectively sealing the group's fate. Another former P-Funk member, Jerome Brailey, helped the group complete the album after Goins's death. The album was released by Arista Records in the fall of 1978.

== Track listing ==
1. "Funk With A Big Foot" (Glenn Goins, Jerome Brailey, Kevin Goins, Greg Fitz)
2. "Funk With A Capital 'G'" (Kevin Goins, Harvey Banks, Jerome Brailey)
3. "Funk 'N' Roll (Dancin' In The Funkshine)" (Glenn Goins, Jerome Brailey)
4. "Workin' On The Buildin'" (Glenn Goins, Kevin Goins, C. Watson)
5. "Your Lovin' Is Easy" (Glenn Goins)
6. "Love Me Baby" (P. Eure a.k.a. Lady Peachena)
7. "Savin' My Love For A Rainy Day" (Richard Banks, Glenn Goins)
8. "Starlight Circus" (Eugene Jackson, Greg Fitz)
9. "Shades Of Quaze" (Richard Banks, Daryl Dixon)

== Personnel ==
- Kevin Goins - guitar and lead vocals
- Eugene Jackson - bass, lead and background vocals
- Richard Banks - keyboards, background vocals
- Greg Fitz - keyboards, background vocals
- Jeff Adams - drums, background vocals
- Lady Peachena - lead and background vocals
- Harvey Banks - guitar, background vocals
- Daryl Dixon - saxophone, clarinet, flute
- Monica Peters - trumpet
- Darryl Deliberto - congas
- Daniel Brack - background vocals, Spiritual Leader.

Additional musicians

- Glenn Goins, Harry and Butch Watson - guitars
- Donald Payne, Glenn Goins - bass
- Jerome Brailey, Glenn Goins - drums
- Glenn Goins - background vocals
- Samuel Jonathan Johnson - keyboards
- Mitchell S. Boulware- Bass
