= A Whole Nother Thang =

Studio album by Fuzzy Haskins
- Released: 1976
- Studio: United Sound Systems, Artie Fields Studios, Pac Three Studios
- Genre: R&B, soul, funk
- Length: 38:10
- Label: Westbound
- Producer: Fuzzy Haskins

Fuzzy Haskins chronology
| A Whole Nother Thang (1976) | Radio Active (1978) |

Professional ratings
Review scores
| Source | Rating |
|---|---|
| Christgau's Record Guide | B |

A Whole Nother Thang is the 1976 debut album by Parliament-Funkadelic vocalist Clarence "Fuzzy" Haskins. The album was released by Westbound Records and features heavy participation from various P-Funk musicians. The album features the track "Cookie Jar", which was later recorded by the P-Funk spin off act Parlet as well as Prince. It is the first P-Funk spin off album not to be produced by George Clinton.

The album was produced and arranged by Haskins. In 1994, the album was reissued along with its successor Radio Active on a single CD entitled A Whole Nother Radio Active Thang (Westbound CDSEWD 099), which also featured the previously unreleased bonus track "Right Back Where I Started From".

== Track listing ==
- All songs written by Fuzzy Haskins, except where noted.
1. "Tangerine Green" 4:18
2. "Cookie Jar" 4:45
3. "Mr. Junk Man" 3:47
4. "I Can See Myself in You" 3:24
5. "Fuz and da Boog" (Haskins, Cordell Mosson) 3:28
6. "Which Way Do I Disco?" 4:10
7. "Love's Now Is Forever" 4:18
8. "Sometimes I Rock and Roll" 4:14
9. "I'll Be Loving You" 5:46
