= P. Funk (Wants to Get Funked Up) =

1976 song by Parliament

- Japanese picture sleeve for the single "P. Funk"

Single by Parliament

from the album Mothership Connection
- B-side: "Night of the Thumpasorus Peoples"
- Released: February 1976
- Recorded: 1975
- Genre: Funk
- Length: 3:38 (Single version); 7:41 (Album version)
- Label: Casablanca 852
- Songwriter(s): George Clinton/Bootsy Collins/Bernie Worrell
- Producer(s): George Clinton

"P. Funk (Wants to Get Funked Up)" is a funk song by Parliament. It is the first track on their 1975 album Mothership Connection and was the first single to be released from the album. It was also released as the B-side of the album's second single, "Give Up the Funk (Tear the Roof Off the Sucker)". It reached number 33 on the U.S. R&B chart.

The tracks "The Roach (The Chronic Outro)" from the Dr. Dre album The Chronic and "Say Hi to the Bad Guy" from the Ice Cube album The Predator both sample from the song.
