= The Parliaments =

American vocal group

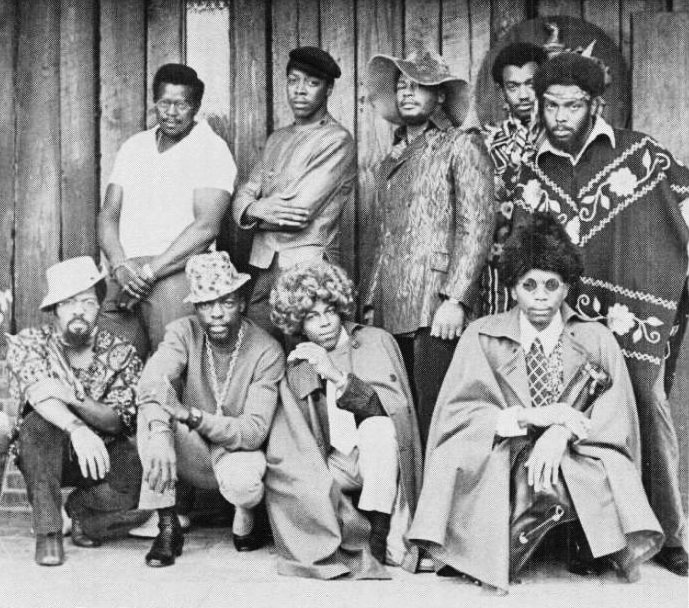
- The Parliaments in 1968

Background information
- Genres: Rhythm and blues; doo-wop
- Occupations: Lead and background singers
- Years active: 1955–1968
- Labels: Apt, Flipp, Golden World, Revilot, Atco
- Spinoffs: Funkadelic; Parliament; Parliament-Funkadelic
- Past members: George Clinton; Ray Davis; Fuzzy Haskins; Calvin Simon; Grady Thomas; Frankie Boyce; Richard Boyce; Langston Booth; Billy Bass Nelson; Eddie Hazel; Tawl Ross; Tiki Fulwood; Mickey Atkins

The Parliaments were an American vocal quintet from Plainfield, New Jersey, United States. Originally formed in the back room of a barbershop in 1956, the quintet was named after the cigarette brand. The Parliaments initially performed doo-wop music; after some early personnel changes their lineup solidified with George Clinton, Ray Davis, Fuzzy Haskins, Calvin Simon, and Grady Thomas. Clinton was group leader and manager, and part owner of the barbershop where the group convened to entertain customers. The group later changed its style, evolving into the bands Parliament and Funkadelic, which found success in the 1970s.

== History ==
The group was originally based on Frankie Lymon & the Teenagers, but by the 1960s had developed a unique sound based on emerging styles of soul and funk music, with a notable penchant for bizarre lyrics. The group struggled for hits during most of the 1960s, recording singles on a variety of small record labels. They switched labels many times, and released several double-sided singles without success, including "Poor Willie" (on Apt), "Lonely Island" (on Flipp) and "Heart Trouble" (on Golden World). "Heart Trouble" was later re-worked in 1973 under the title "You Can't Miss What You Can't Measure", featured on the Funkadelic album Cosmic Slop. Another version was recorded about three years earlier, yet did not surface until the 2008 release of the CD "Toys". The B-side, "That Was My Girl", was re-recorded in 1972 and featured on America Eats Its Young.

Eventually, Clinton gained employment at Motown Records as a songwriter and producer, making weekly trips to Detroit to produce for The Pets, Roy Handy, and other acts. In 1967 the Parliaments released "(I Wanna) Testify" on Revilot and finally achieved a hit single, with the song reaching No. 3 R&B and No. 20 Pop on the Billboard charts. In reality, Clinton was the only member of the Parliaments to appear in the song, as the other members were unable to travel to Detroit for the recording session (session singers and musicians rounded out the recording). To capitalize on the single's success, Clinton put together a backing band for a tour, expanding the Parliaments to the five singers plus five backing musicians.

After the success of "(I Wanna) Testify", Clinton became embroiled in a contractual dispute surrounding the bankruptcy of Revilot Records and temporarily lost the rights to the name "The Parliaments." In order to continue recording for other labels, Clinton renamed the entire ensemble Funkadelic (a name coined by bassist Billy Bass Nelson). Clinton positioned Funkadelic as a funk-rock band featuring the five backing musicians with the five Parliaments singers as uncredited guests. When Revilot declared bankruptcy the Parliaments were sold to Atlantic Records, and Clinton abandoned doo-wop to avoid working for Atlantic. Even with Funkadelic operating as a recording and touring entity, in 1970 Clinton relaunched the Parliaments as a new R&B-based funk band, now known as Parliament. The lineup still consisted of the five original singers plus the five backing musicians, with the two acts signed to different labels and marketed as performing different types of funk.

Several songs from the early repertoire of the Parliaments would be re-recorded on future Parliament and Funkadelic albums, including "Testify," "The Goose," "All Your Goodies Are Gone," "Fantasy Is Reality," "Good Ole Music," "I Can Feel The Ice Melting," "What You Been Growing," "I'll Wait," and "That Was My Girl." In 1995, many of the original Parliaments tracks were reissued on the Goldmine/Soul label on the album Testifyin'.

== Band members ==
- George Clinton- band leader, vocals (1955-1969)
- Ray Davis- vocals (1955-1969)
- Fuzzy Haskins- vocals (1955-1969)
- Calvin Simon- vocals (1955-1969)
- Grady Thomas- vocals (1955-1969)
- Frankie Boyce- guitar (1964-1966)
- Richard Boyce- bass guitar (1964-1966)
- Langston Booth- drums (1964-1966)
- Billie Bass Nelson- bass guitar (1967-1968)
- Eddie Hazel- guitar (1967-1968)
- Tawl Ross- rhythm guitar (1967-1968)
- Tiki Fullwood- drums (1967-1968)

== The Silk Palace ==
The West End of Plainfield, New Jersey was once home to the Silk Palace, a barbershop at 216 Plainfield Avenue owned in part by Clinton, staffed by various members of Parliament-Funkadelic and known as the "hangout for all the local singers and musicians" in Plainfield's 1950s and 1960s doo-wop, soul, rock and proto-funk music scene.

== Discography ==
=== Albums ===
- Backtrack: six-track various artists compilation, featuring four singles by the Parliaments originally released on Revilot records, as well as one track by the Debonaires that was co-written and produced by George Clinton.
- The Parliaments - I Wanna Testify: Goldmine/Soul Supply GSCD 52 - contains all of the Parliaments Revilot singles, as well as instrumental versions of "I'll Wait", "Baby I Owe You Something Good", and "All Your Goodies Are Gone", as well as the Clinton-penned track "Let's Make It Last" recorded by The Fellows.
- The Parliaments - Testifyin': The Mid 60's Detroit Sessions: Goldmine/Soul Supply GSCD 119 - contains the same tracks as "I Wanna Testify", and also includes the Golden World single "Heart Trouble/That Was My Girl.
- The Parliaments - Testify: The Best of the Early Years: Connoisseur VSOP CD 286 - contains all of the tracks featured on "Testify" and also includes "She's Always There", which is the flip side to the Fellows single "Let's Make It Last".

=== Singles ===
- "Poor Willie" / "Party Boys" APT 45-25036
- "Lonely Island" / "You Make Me Wanna Cry" FL-45-100
- "Heart Trouble" / "That Was My Girl" GW-46
- "(I Wanna) Testify" / "I Can Feel the Ice Melting" RV-207
- "All Your Goodies Are Gone" / "Don't Be Sore At Me" RV-211
- "Little Man" / "The Goose (That Laid the Golden Egg)" RV-214
- "Look at What I Almost Missed" / "What You Been Growing" RV-217
- "Good Ole Music" / "Time" RV-223
- "A New Day Begins" / "I'll Wait" RV-228 (later reissued on the Atco label-ATCO 45-6675)

== See also ==
- Parliament (band)
- Parliament-Funkadelic
- List of P-Funk members
