= Give Up the Funk (Tear the Roof off the Sucker) =

- UK picture sleeve for the single "Give Up the Funk (Tear the Roof off the Sucker)"

Single by Parliament

from the album Mothership Connection
- B-side: "P. Funk (Wants to Get Funked Up)"
- Released: April 1976
- Recorded: 1975
- Genre: Funk
- Length: 3:39 (Single version); 5:45 (Album version)
- Label: Casablanca; 856
- Songwriters: Jerome Brailey; George Clinton; Bootsy Collins
- Producer: George Clinton

Parliament singles chronology
"P. Funk (Wants to Get Funked Up)" (1976)	"Give Up the Funk (Tear the Roof off the Sucker)" (1976)	"Mothership Connection (Star Child)" (1976)

"Give Up the Funk (Tear the Roof off the Sucker)" is a funk song by Parliament. It was released as a single under the name "Tear the Roof off the Sucker (Give Up the Funk)". It was the second single to be released from Parliament's 1975 album Mothership Connection (following "P. Funk (Wants to Get Funked Up)"). With its anthemic sing-along chorus, it is one of the most famous P-Funk songs. It also became Parliament's first certified million-selling single, going Gold on October 19th, 1976.

The bass vocal at the beginning of the song is performed by Ray Davis.

== Single version ==
The single version begins without the "tear the roof off the sucker" intro.

== Chart performance ==
"Give Up the Funk (Tear the Roof off the Sucker)" was the highest-charting single from the album, reaching number five on the Billboard Hot Soul Singles chart and number fifteen on the Billboard Hot 100 pop singles chart. In Canada it reached number 17.

== Samples and covers ==
The phrase "turn those mothers out" is sung repeatedly in the bridge to the 1990 song "Flovilla Thatch vs. The Virile Garbageman" by American ska-funk rock band the Cherry Poppin' Daddies. This was an intentional homage to Parliament.

In 1991, Ecuadorian rapper Gerardo Mejía sampled the chorus on "We Want The Funk", from the album "Mo Ritmo", adding rap lyrics. It peaked at #16 on the Billboard Hot 100.

Compton rapper Tweedy Bird Loc edited the intro & used it as an intro itself in his hit song "Coming Out The Cage" on his 1992 debut album '187 Ride By'.

The 1993 song "Who Am I? (Whats My Name?)" by West Coast Hip-Hop artist Snoop Doggy Dogg features female vocalists recreating the "La la la" section. Indeed, many of the tracks from Snoop's debut 1993 album Doggystyle and many of the early production works from Dr. Dre either sampled or recreated parts of many tracks from Parliament and its sister act Funkadelic.

The song is one of many cover songs the accordion-based comedy rock band Those Darn Accordions have performed live.

The phrase "...turn this mother out" from Parliament's "Give Up the Funk (Tear the Roof Off the Sucker)" is repeated in the bridge of MC Hammer's song "Turn This Mutha' Out" released on his 1988 album "Let's Get It Started".

The American television series Glee covered the song in the season one episode "Funk".

In 2024, the song entered the rotation of campaign rally songs for Kamala Harris' campaign for President.
