= P-Funk Earth Tour =

1976–77 concert tour by Parliament-Funkadelic

- Tour by Parliament-Funkadelic
- Location: United States
- Associated album: Live: P-Funk Earth Tour
- Start date: April 1976
- End date: Mid-1977
- No. of shows: 23
- Budget: $275,000

The P-Funk Earth Tour was a concert tour by Parliament-Funkadelic in 1976–1977, featuring absurd costumes, lavish staging and special effects, and music from both the Parliament and Funkadelic repertoires.

The P-Funk Earth Tour was ambitious from the start. Casablanca Records executive Neil Bogart gave George Clinton a $275,000 budget for production, the largest amount ever allocated for a Black music act to tour. Clinton hired Jules Fischer as set designer, who had previously worked on tours for The Rolling Stones, Kiss, and other rock bands. Both the show's music and production elements were extensively rehearsed at an aircraft hangar in Newburgh, New York. The show required seven trucks to transport its equipment and scenery. With a broad range of themes embodied in the show's production, culminating in the Afrofuturist landing of the P-Funk Mothership, author Rickey Vincent states that the P-Funk Earth Tour "drew from the ribald, uncensored entirety of the Black tradition in mind-blowing ways no one had yet even attempted." Rolling Stone viewed the tour as embracing Clinton's "semiserious funk mythology" with "[a] mixture of tribal funk, elaborate stage props and the relentless assault on personal inhibition [that] resembled nothing so much as a Space Age Mardi Gras." The New York Times described the tour as featuring "superbly silly, lavish costumes" and an "opulent Baroque ... stage show".

The tour began in April 1976 in Nashville. The 1977 live album Live: P-Funk Earth Tour was recorded at two early 1977 concerts, January 19 at the Los Angeles Forum and January 21 at the Oakland Coliseum. The tour drew to a close in mid-1977; its expenses were as high as its innovation level and it was losing money steadily; indeed one tour assistant's job was "to tell the musicians why they weren't getting paid." Nevertheless, the tour served as valuable publicity and marketing for "the P-Funk brand", making reference to the greater Parliament-Funkadelic-Clinton enterprise of acts, records, side projects, spin-offs, and so forth.

In 1986, Capitol issued a recording of a late 1976 concert as Mothership Connection: Live From Houston, attributed to George Clinton and Parliament-Funkadelic.

Date	City	Country	Venue
April 16, 1976	Nashville	United States	Nashville Municipal Auditorium
April 18, 1976	Cleveland	United States	Allen Theatre
April 24, 1976	Richmond	United States	Richmond Coliseum
May 14, 1976	Cincinnati	United States	Riverfront Coliseum
May 15, 1976	Pittsburgh	United States	Civic Arena
May 29, 1976	Philadelphia	United States	Spectrum
June 11, 1976	Tulsa	United States	Tulsa Assembly Center
June 20, 1976	Detroit	United States	Masonic Temple
July 13, 1976	Orlando	United States	Orlando Sports Stadium
July 18, 1976	Nashville	United States	Nashville Municipal Auditorium
August 12, 1976	Seattle	United States	Paramount Theatre
August 14, 1976	Los Angeles	United States	Shrine Auditorium
September 26, 1976	Newburgh	United States	Stewart International Airport
October 2, 1976	Providence	United States	Providence Civic Center
October 27, 1976	New Orleans	United States	Municipal Auditorium
October 28, 1976	Baton Rouge	United States	LSU Assembly Center
October 29, 1976	Jackson	United States	Mississippi Coliseum
October 30, 1976	Lake Charles	United States	Lake Charles Civic Center
October 31, 1976	Houston	United States	The Summit
November 3, 1976	San Antonio	United States	HemisFair Arena
November 5, 1976	Dallas	United States	Dallas Convention Center
November 6, 1976	Norman	United States	Lloyd Noble Center
November 7, 1976	Tulsa	United States	Tulsa Assembly Center
