= Mothership Connection (Star Child) =

"Star Child"

Single by Parliament

from the album Mothership Connection
- A-side: "Star Child"
- B-side: "Supergroovalisticprosifunkstication"
- Released: August 1976
- Recorded: 1975
- Genre: P-Funk
- Length: 6:11 (album version); 3:08 (7" edit)
- Label: Casablanca 864
- Songwriter: George Clinton/Bootsy Collins/Bernie Worrell
- Producer: George Clinton

"Mothership Connection (Star Child)" is a funk song by American band Parliament. It was the third and last single released from the group's 1975 album Mothership Connection. The song introduces George Clinton's messianic alien alter ego Star Child for the first time (see P-Funk mythology).

The lyrics "Swing down, sweet chariot, stop and let me ride" quote the traditional spiritual "Swing Down, Sweet Chariot", first popularized in the 1940s by The Golden Gate Quartet and later recorded by Rufus (with Chaka Khan on vocals) as well as Elvis Presley, among others. (The basis for the lyric is not the better-known spiritual "Swing Low, Sweet Chariot".)

The track "Let Me Ride" on the Dr. Dre album The Chronic is heavily based on samples from this song.

In 1998, Scott Grooves produced a remix version of this song under the title Mothership Reconnection, followed by yet another remix by Scott Grooves, Slam and Daft Punk.

The song was the inspiration for Dave Parker's "Boys Boppin'" shirt.

== Alternate titles ==
The song was titled simply "Star Child" on its single release, while the radio promo version was titled "Star Child (Mothership Connection)." This version uses the same track from Mothership Connection but fades out at 3:08. It is included as a bonus track on the Mothership Connection CD.

On the album Live: P-Funk Earth Tour the song is split into two tracks, "Mothership Connection (Star Child)" and "Swing Down, Sweet Chariot."

== Cover versions ==
In 1990, bassist Stanley Clarke and keyboardist George Duke released an album entitled "3," which contained a cover of this song.
