= Fuzzy Haskins =

American funk singer (1941–2023)

- Birth name: Clarence Eugene Haskins
- Born: June 8, 1941; Elkhorn, West Virginia, U.S.
- Died: March 16, 2023 (aged 81); Grosse Pointe Woods, Michigan, U.S.
- Genres: R&B, funk
- Occupation(s): Musician, record producer
- Instrument(s): Vocals, guitar, drums
- Labels: Westbound, Ace

Clarence Eugene "Fuzzy" Haskins (June 8, 1941 – March 16, 2023) was an American singer. He performed with 1950s and 1960s doo-wop group, The Parliaments, and was a founding member of 1970s funk bands Parliament and Funkadelic, also known as Parliament-Funkadelic. He left Parliament-Funkadelic in 1977 to pursue a solo career. He is a member of the Rock and Roll Hall of Fame, inducted in 1997 with fifteen other members of Parliament-Funkadelic. In 2019, he and Parliament-Funkadelic were given Grammy Lifetime Achievement Awards.

== Early life ==
Haskins was born in Elkhorn, West Virginia, and grew up in New Jersey. Starting in the late 1950s, he was a founding member of doo wop vocal group The Parliaments, led by George Clinton. The group originated as a barbershop quintet in the back room of a barber shop on West 3rd Street in Plainfield, New Jersey. Haskins often sang lead in the group. They started traveling to Detroit, Michigan on weekends in order to audition for Motown Records and to participate in the fertile music scene there. The Parliaments released singles on several record labels, but did not have a hit until 1967 when "(I Wanna) Testify," on the small Detroit imprint Revilot Records, reached #3 on the Billboard R&B singles chart. The song was actually recorded by George Clinton and a group called The Holidays, as the other Parliaments didn't make it to Detroit that week. Revilot went out of business, and in the process, the group lost their name, The Parliaments.

== Career ==
By 1970, the five Parliaments singers were touring with five backing musicians known separately as Funkadelic. The highly rehearsed performances and suited look of The Parliaments gave way to the members dressing in their own outrageous styles. Haskins wore long johns on stage. Due to the contractual issues surrounding the group name, Clinton signed the band as Funkadelic to Westbound Records. The ensemble released their first album Funkadelic in 1970. Clinton also renamed his group of singers Parliament (but still with the Funkadelic musicians as official members) and signed that act to the Holland-Dozier-Holland-owned record label, Invictus. Parliament released their first album Osmium in 1970. Clinton now had two groups that were actually one entity. Under the name Funkadelic, the ensemble was geared towards a rock audience, and as Parliament it was aimed at a soul music audience. Collectively, they became known as Parliament-Funkadelic, or P-Funk. Haskins contributed to P-Funk as a writer through 1972. He toured and appeared on P-Funk albums as a singer, and occasionally as a guitarist, throughout the 1970s. In June 1977 at the height of P-Funk's popularity, Haskins (along with other original Parliaments Calvin Simon and Grady Thomas) left the ensemble over financial and management disputes with Clinton.

Haskins released his first solo album, A Whole Nother Thang, in 1976. The album featured P-Funk members: Tiki Fulwood and Cordell "Boogie" Mosson on drums, and Bootsy Collins and Mosson on bass. Bernie Worrell makes an appearance on keyboards, contributing horn and string arrangements as well. Haskins served as producer, singer, songwriter, guitarist and even drummer on one song. Haskins released his second album, Radio Active, two years later. An Ace compilation from 1994 reissued both albums on one CD.

In 1981, Haskins, Simon, and Thomas formed a new funk band using the name Funkadelic, appeared on Soul Train under that name, and released the album, Connections & Disconnections. The album was later reissued on CD with the title Who's a Funkadelic? in 1992. In the 1990s, Haskins toured with Original P, a group made up of four of the original five Parliaments.

== Personal life and death ==
Haskins was married twice, to Estelle James and Lorraine Debney, with both marriages ending in divorce. He had five children, two of whom predeceased him. He lived in Southfield, Michigan, a suburb of Detroit.

Haskins suffered a serious stroke in 2022. He died from complications of diabetes in Grosse Pointe Woods, Michigan, on March 16, 2023, at the age of 81.

== Discography ==
- A Whole Nother Thang (1976), Westbound
- Radio Active (1978), Westbound
- A Whole Nother Radio Active Thang (1994), Westbound/Ace – reissue of both albums on one CD

== Sources ==
- Bowman, Rob (1992). Music for Your Mother [CD liner notes]. Westbound Records.
- Bowman, Rob (1994). A Whole Nother Radio Active Thang 1976–1978 [CD liner notes]. Ace Records Ltd.
- Bowman, Rob (1996). Live: Meadowbrook, Rochester, Michigan – September 12, 1971 [CD liner notes]. Westbound Records.
- Hamilton, Andrew. "I Wanna Testify". AllMusic.
- Vincent, Rickey (1996). Funk: The Music, The People, and The Rhythm of The One. St. Martin's Press. ISBN 0-312-13499-1
