= Dr. Funkenstein =

Single by Parliament

from the album The Clones of Dr. Funkenstein
- B-side: "Children of Production"
- Released: January 1977
- Genre: Funk
- Length: 5:46 (album version)
- Label: Casablanca NB 875
- Songwriters: George Clinton; Bootsy Collins; Bernie Worrell
- Producer: George Clinton

"Dr. Funkenstein" is a song by American funk band Parliament. It was the second single released from their 1976 album, The Clones of Dr. Funkenstein. It reached number 46 on the Billboard Hot Soul Singles chart.

Dr. Funkenstein was one of George Clinton's many alter egos in the P-Funk mythology.

A live version of the song was performed by the Red Hot Chili Peppers in the late eighties and appears on the 1998 compilation, Under the Covers: Essential Red Hot Chili Peppers.

In the 2015 Doctor Who episode "The Zygon Invasion", the Twelfth Doctor identifies himself as "Dr. Funkenstein".
