= Grady Thomas =

American singer (born 1941)

Grady Thomas (born January 5, 1941, in Newark, New Jersey, United States) is a former member of the bands Parliament and Funkadelic. He is a member of the Rock and Roll Hall of Fame, inducted in 1997 with fifteen other members of Parliament-Funkadelic.

Thomas started out in the late 1950s as one of The Parliaments, a doo wop barbershop quintet led by George Clinton. In 1977, Thomas (along with original Parliaments Fuzzy Haskins and Calvin Simon), left Parliament-Funkadelic after financial and management disputes with Clinton. In 1981, the trio caused confusion when they formed a new band, and released an album called Connections and Disconnections under the name Funkadelic. After a return stint with George Clinton and the P-Funk Allstars in the 1990s, Thomas, along with original Parliaments bass vocalist Ray Davis (musician), Haskins, and Simon founded "Original P" in 1998, with whom Thomas currently performs. In 2019, he and Parliament-Funkadelic were given Grammy Lifetime Achievement Awards.
