= Glenn Goins =

- Glenn Goins in 1976

Background information
- Born: Glenn Lamonte Goins; January 2, 1954; Plainfield, New Jersey, United States
- Died: July 29, 1978 (aged 24)
- Genres: Funk, R&B
- Occupations: Musician, Songwriter, Producer
- Instruments: Vocals, Guitar, Bass, Drums

Glenn Lamonte Goins (January 2, 1954 – July 29, 1978), also spelled "Glen" in some sources, was a singer and guitarist for Parliament-Funkadelic in the mid-1970s. Goins is a member of the Rock and Roll Hall of Fame, posthumously inducted in 1997 with fifteen other members of Parliament-Funkadelic.

== Biography ==
Goins was born and raised in Plainfield, New Jersey in a family of gospel musicians, His first known recordings were in 1972 as part of a group called The Bags, who were produced by Jerry Ragovoy. Singer Garry Shider was an associate of The Bags, and Shider introduced Goins to Parliament-Funkadelic leader George Clinton in 1974. Goins joined the collective and performed lead vocals and guitar on albums by both Parliament and Funkadelic from 1975 to 1977. Goins was known particularly for his gospel-inflected vocals while introducing the "Mothership" prop during concerts.

In 1977, Goins was one of the first prominent members of Parliament-Funkadelic to leave due to disputes with Clinton's management. Goins formed the funk band Quazar, and began to record a debut album for Arista Records. Before the album was completed, Goins died at age 24 from Hodgkin's lymphoma. Another former member of Parliament-Funkadelic, Jerome Brailey, helped complete the album and it was released several months later.

== Studio album ==
- Quazar, 1978 (with Quazar)
