= Nettrice Gaskins =

Digital artist

Nettrice R. Gaskins
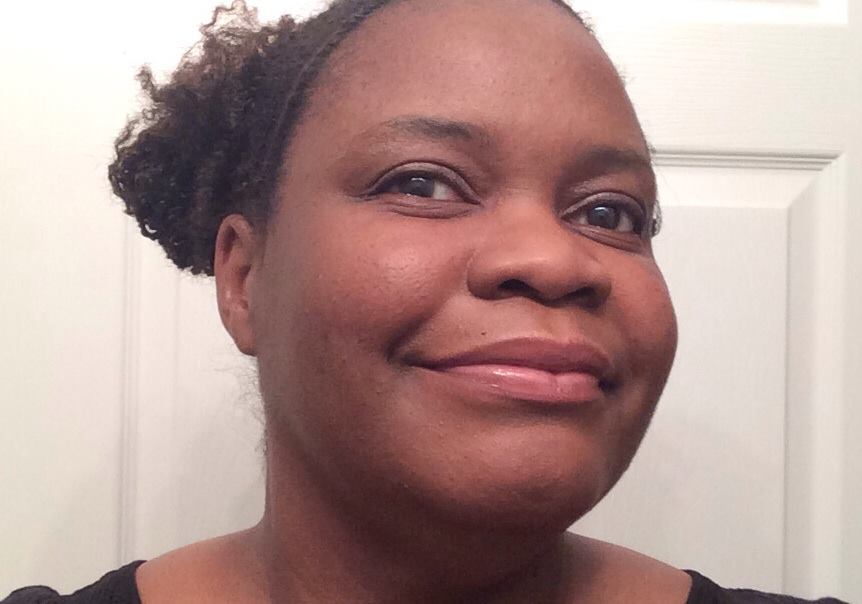
- Born: September 25, 1970 (age 56); Baltimore, Maryland, U.S.
- Education: BFA, Computer Graphics, Pratt Institute (1992); MFA, Art and Technology, School of the Art Institute of Chicago (1994); PhD, Digital Media, Georgia Institute of Technology (2014)
- Known for: Art & Technology
- Website: nettricegaskins.com

Nettrice R. Gaskins (born September 25, 1970) is an African-American digital artist, educator, cultural critic and advocate of STEAM fields. Her work explores Afrofuturism, maker culture, and the ways technology is used by communities with their own unique knowledge and practices. She is the author of Techno-Vernacular Creativity and Innovation: Culturally Relevant Making Inside and Outside of the Classroom (2021), published by the MIT Press.

== Education ==
Gaskins was born in Baltimore, Maryland. She attended Pratt Institute in Brooklyn, where she earned a BFA in Computer Graphics in 1992. In 1994 she received her MFA in Art and Technology from the School of the Art Institute of Chicago. After working in K–12 and post-secondary education, community media, and technology, Gaskins received a doctorate in Digital Media from Georgia Tech in 2014. Her cognitive science classes with Nancy J. Nersessian informed her work about augmented reality and virtual worlds. Her thesis considered some formal aspects of graffiti as mathematical patterns, among other culturally relevant STEAM examples. Celia Pearce served as her doctoral advisor.

== Career ==
Gaskins investigates humans versus nature, sound versus imagery. She wants people of color to be able to see themselves in computing and digital technology fields. She is known for her STEAM work, arguing that adding Art to the traditional Science, Technology, Engineering and Math education will open more opportunities for students of color. She believes that STEM has always existed within groups that are not traditionally part of the mainstream discourse, and through the arts (like hip-hop, film, dance, theater, video games, and visual art) people may realize that these groups were always part of the conversation. She is inspired by the “entrepreneurial spirit," as she calls it, as a way to progress, visible in such ingenious pioneers as Fred Eversley, John Coltrane, Sun Ra, George Clinton and Grandmaster Flash who adapted the currently used cross-fader from reclaimed electronics.

Her work creates spaces that respond to culture, within a culture, thus become a catalyst for change inside communities, instead of being in the control of others. She is known for her cultural criticism, including the unpacking of Beyoncé's Formation video at the intersection of contemporary police killings of black boys and the story of traditional voodoo spirit, Ghede Nibo. Gaskins is also known for her daily practice of creating AI-generated and AI-assisted art that counters bias in machine learning.

In 2014, Gaskins spoke at a symposium called "Afrofuturism in Black Theology: Race, Gender, Sexuality and the State of Black Religion in the Black Metropolis" featuring George Clinton at Vanderbilt University. She spoke at a symposium called "Why Comix? Drawing the World You Want to See" about representation in comics at Northwestern University and on a panel called the Aesthetic Architecture Symposium titled "The Aesthetics of Activism: Afro-Futurism, Xenofeminism, and Disobedient Objects" at Yale University in 2016.

Gaskins' digital installation, AR Virtual Sounding Space, using both physical computing and projection mapping, was the 2015 feature of Paseo Pop Up, a festival produced by Paseo Projects in Taos, New Mexico. It was a digital projection on the Luna Chapel at the Couse-Sharp Historic Site. The immersive projected piece was inspired by cosmograms, culturally-based maps of space and time like the medicine wheel. The public then could affect the piece through gloves that control the sound and color of the projection. As part of this engagement, she was one of a few artists with engagements in Electrofunk Mixtape: A Virtual Sounding Space, a workshop with local students. She performed Electrofunk Mixtape: Illuminus Edition with Hank Shocklee in Boston, MA as part of the Illuminus outdoor festival.

In 2017, Gaskins was in the group exhibition, We Have Always Lived in the Future at Flux Factory in Long Island City, NY. This show was mentioned in Art in America, specifically how her work "presents opportunities for rousing transcendence."

In 2018, Gaskins was in the group exhibition, Probability & Uncertainty at Union College's Mandeville Gallery in Schenectady, NY. "Afrofuturism Amplified in Three Dimensions" included a lecture and maker workshop. In the show, Gaskins was one of six women artists working with scientific themes. She also presented at the National Art Education Association in Seattle, WA, in Barcelona as part of STEAMConf 2018 and in Madrid as part of International Girls in ICT Day.

Gaskins' algorithmic, "neural network" generated portrait of Wangari Muta Maathai was featured in the 2019 Horticultural Heroes, an exhibit at Tower Hill Botanic Garden in Boylston, MA. Her work was one five commissions slated to appear at the Smithsonian's FUTURES exhibition, which is scheduled to open in November 2021 in the Arts and Industries Building. Her "Featured Futurists" portraits that include such figures as Octavia Butler were made using an A.I. neural network application called DeepDream.

In 2021, Gaskins was part of the Transfiguration group exhibition at the Frost Art Museum in Miami, Florida. The show was part of the Martin Luther King, Jr. Exhibition Series, which addresses issues of race, diversity, social justice, civil rights, and humanity. Gaskins also gave an artist talk in conjunction with the exhibition.

In 2022, Gaskins' AI-assisted portrait of Greg Tate was installed as an outdoor mural by the Museum of Contemporary African Diasporan Art (MoCADA) in Brooklyn, NY. The same image was on view at Lincoln Center in NYC as part of In Praise of Shadow Boxers, Dissonance & Dissidents: A Pop-Up Tribute Exhibition to Greg Tate.

Gaskins' AI-assisted artwork was on display as part of The Black Angel of History: Myth-Science, Metamodernism, and the Metaverse in Carnegie Hall's Zankel Hall Gallery. In addition, she was commissioned to create five AI-generated portraits for the Boston Modern Opera Project's As Told By: History, Race, and Justice on the Opera Stage series.

Gaskins' AI-based works are part of the SFO Museum's Women of Afrofuturism exhibition at the SFO Museum in the San Francisco International Airport. Her work sparked a minor social media backlash in December 2025 when a YouTuber and Redditors argued that displaying AI-generated art in a public space, rather than art created by human hands, constituted "slop"—a term for low-effort, mass-produced AI content. The SFO Museum stood by the exhibition, noting they work directly with artists and that the show includes a mix of human-made and AI-assisted art, with strong support for the featured artists.

== Selected work ==
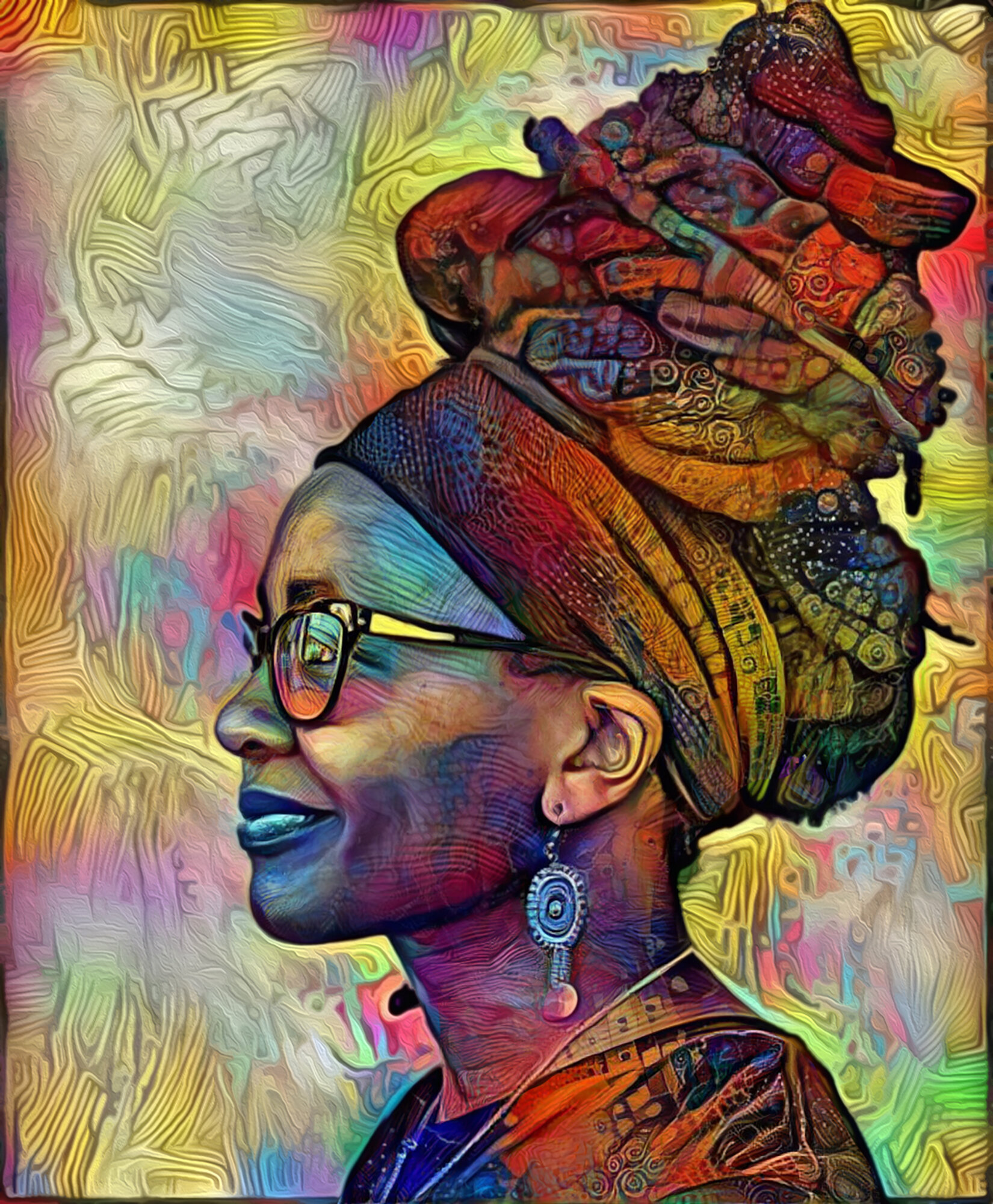
On view in "Transfiguration" at the Frost Art Museum in 2021.

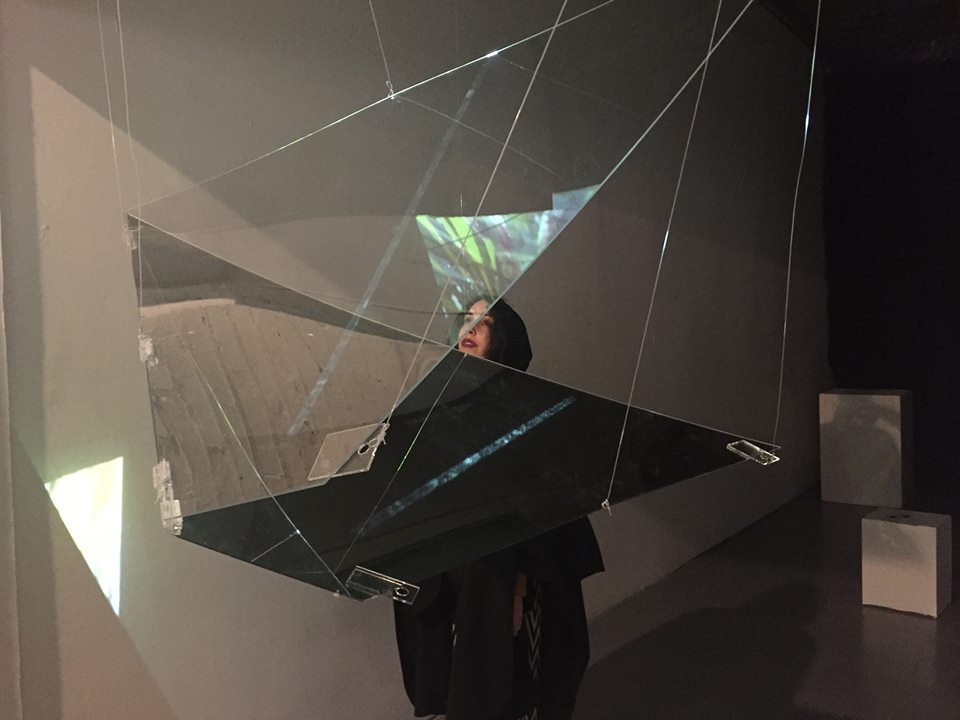
On view in "We Have Always Lived in the Future" at Flux Factory in 2017

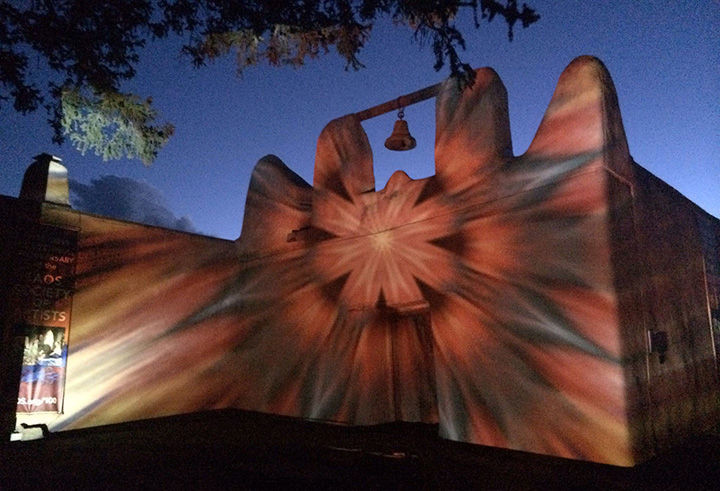
At the PASEO outdoor arts festival in Taos, NM in 2015

== Publications ==
- Gaskins, Nettrice. "Soul Circuitry: Chronicles of Cyborgian Intelligence in Afrofuturism." Oxford Intersections: Racism by Context (Oxford, online edn, Oxford Academic, 20 Mar. 2025).
- Gaskins, Nettrice. "Interrogating Algorithmic Bias: From Speculative Fiction to Liberatory Design." TechTrends. (Sept. 11, 2022).
- Gaskins, Nettrice. "Interrogating AI Bias through Digital Art." Just Tech. Social Science Research Council. (Sept. 7, 2022).
- Gaskins, Nettrice. Techno-Vernacular Creativity and Innovation. Cambridge, MA: The MIT Press (August 2021).
- Gaskins, Nettrice. "Cosmogramic Design: A Cultural Model of the Aesthetic Response." In Aesthetics Equals Politics: New Discourses across Art, Architecture, and Philosophy. Cambridge, MA: The MIT Press, 2019.
- Gaskins, Nettrice. "Techno-Vernacular Creativity and Innovation across the African Diaspora and Global South." In Captivating Technology: Race, Carceral Technoscience, and Liberatory Imagination in Everyday Life. Durham, NC: Duke University Press, 2019.
- Gaskins, Nettrice. "Mama Wata Remixed: The Mermaid in Contemporary African-American Culture." In Scaled for Success: The Internationalisation of the Mermaid. East Barnet, UK: John Libbey Publishing, 2018.
- Gaskins, Nettrice. "Why Black Panther's Shuri Is So Important To Young Black Girls and Maker Culture" SyFy Wired (February 27, 2018).
- Gaskins, Nettrice. "Deep Sea Dwellers: Drexciya and the Sonic Third Space." Shima: The International Journal of Research into Island Cultures 10, no. 2 (2016). doi:10.21463/shima.10.2.08.
- Gaskins, Nettrice. "How Art and Dance Are Making Computer Science Culturally Relevant" EdSurge. (July 26, 2016).
- Gaskins, Nettrice. "Marvel's Black Panther Makes STEAM Relevant to Under Represented Youth; Plus, VR's Century-Old Roots" EdSurge. (July 5, 2016).
- Gaskins, Nettrice. "Afrofuturism on Web 3.0: Vernacular Cartography and Augmented Space." In Afrofuturism 2.0: The Rise of Astroblackness. Lanham, MA: Lexington Books, 2016.
- Gaskins, Nettrice. "The African Cosmogram Matrix in Contemporary Art and Culture." Black Theology 14, no. 1 (2016): 28–42. doi:10.1080/14769948.2015.1131502.
- Gaskins, Nettrice. "Re-Creating Niobe: The Construction and Re-Construction of Black Femininity through Games and the Social Psychology of the Avatar." In Future Texts: Subversive Performance and Feminist Bodies. Anderson, SC: Parlor Press, 2016.
- Gaskins, Nettrice. "Welcome to Afrofuturism 3.0" Slate. (December 2, 2015).
- Gaskins, Nettrice. "Deconstructing the unisphere: hip-hop on a shrinking globe in an expanding universe." In Meet Me At the Fair, 155–64. Pittsburgh, PA: ETC Press, 2014.
- Gaskins, Nettrice. "Advancing STEM Through Culturally Situated Arts-Based Learning." Journal of the New Media Caucus 9, no. 1 (Spring 2013).
- Gaskins, Nettrice. "Urban Metaphysics: Creating Game Layers on Top of the World." UCLA's Journal of Cinema and Media Studies (Winter 2012).
