= Women of Afrofuturism =

American art exhibition (2025–2026)

- Exhibition entrance poster featuring mOTHERboard (2024) by Nettrice Gaskins
- American art exhibition (2025–2026)
- Country: United States
- Location: San Mateo County
- Opened: SFO Museum (San Francisco International Airport), 17 May 2025 – 15 November 2026
- Exhibited: 17 featured works of art, plus eight supplemental artworks, and additional cultural and technological artifacts from the 20th century
- Curator: Nicole Mullen; Ingrid LaFleur
- Organiser: SFO Museum
- Website: www.sfomuseum.org/exhibitions/women-afrofuturism

Women of Afrofuturism was a group art exhibition at the SFO Museum at the San Francisco International Airport, on view from May 17, 2025, through November 15, 2026. It featured modern work by five Black women in the Afrofuturism movement, including filmmaker Celia C. Peters, digital artist Nettrice Gaskins, artist Alisha B. Wormsley, designer Afatasi the Artist, and artist D. Denenge Duyst-Akpem. The exhibition also paid tribute to the pioneering Black women who contributed to Afrofuturism long before the term was invented, including science fiction writer Octavia E. Butler and musician Alice Coltrane, among many others.

== Background ==
Afrofuturism is a cultural aesthetic that imagines possible futures from the perspective of Black culture and experience using speculative fiction and technology. Popular genres include literature, music, fashion, film and the visual arts. Writer Mark Dery first coined the term (Note: Dery posed the question: "Can a community whose past has been deliberately rubbed out, and whose energies have subsequently been consumed by the search for legible traces of its history, imagine possible futures? Furthermore, isn't the unreal estate of the future already owned by the technocrats, futurologists, streamliners, and set designers-white to a man-who have engineered our collective fantasies?" To answer this question, Dery interviewed science fiction writer Samuel R. Delany, cultural critic Greg Tate, and scholar Tricia Rose, uncovering an older, unnamed legacy of Afrofuturism that previously went unrecognized, while also pointing to its continuing influence and presence in new works today.) in the essay "Black to the Future" (1993), giving a name to cultural practices and ideas whose roots predated it. The first Afrofuturist theorists to consider the subject included Greg Tate, Mark Sinker, and Kodwo Eshun. Afrofuturist scholarship also brought renewed attention to the work of earlier artists such as Sun Ra, George Clinton, and Octavia E. Butler within this new framework.

== Venue ==
Women of Afrofuturism was exhibited at the SFO Museum at the San Francisco International Airport, from May 17, 2025, through November 15, 2026, extended from its original closing date of September. The exhibition appeared in the 1D Alley Gallery space in the post-security area of Boarding Area B in Harvey Milk Terminal 1, Departures Level 2. It replaced the previous exhibition, Rosie the Riveter: Womanpower in Wartime, in that same space. SFO is the only airport in the United States with a museum accredited by the American Alliance of Museums. Its galleries are open 24 hours a day, with approximately 54 million passengers passing through the airport as of 2025. The exhibition was freely accessible to all ticketed passengers. (Note: Non-ticketed passengers who wish to visit museum exhibits in post-security areas and who possess a REAL ID or passport can apply for an SFO Gate Explorer pass to access the gallery.) Scheduled tours of the gallery are held once a week, with unscheduled tours also available for visitors who make special arrangements.

== Curators and artists ==
The exhibition was curated by Nicole Mullen, with curatorial consultation from futurist Ingrid LaFleur, founder of the Afrofuture Strategies Institute. LaFleur describes Women of Afrofuturism as one of the first exhibitions to prominently feature women artists in the movement. Five of the featured Black women artists in the exhibition include Oakland-based filmmaker and artist Celia C. Peters, Boston-based digital artist and academic Nettrice Gaskins, Pittsburgh-based interdisciplinary artist Alisha B. Wormsley, San Francisco native and Afro-Polynesian Afatasi the Artist, and Nigerian-born artist, writer, and educator D. Denenge Duyst-Akpem.

Peters creates films and digital collage based on her lifelong interest in science fiction. She uses her stories to create fashion designs based on her futuristic characters. The characters in one of her films inspired Peters to design the Godspeed Collexion, a futuristic fashion collection that debuted during Oakland Style Week in 2024.

Gaskins holds a BFA in computer graphics, an MFA in Art and Technology, and a PhD in digital media from the Georgia Institute of Technology. She promotes STEAM education at Lesley University as assistant director of the STEAM Learning Lab. She is also trained in the visual arts. She has taught computational media, visual art, and computer science to high school students studying art. She began using deep learning algorithms in her own work after 2016. Her AI art has been exhibited at the Smithsonian, the Lincoln Center, and the Museum of Contemporary African Diasporan Art.

Wormsley creates mixed media art about the future using the concept of Black matriarchy to inform her work. Her project, "THERE ARE BLACK PEOPLE IN THE FUTURE", has been active since 2012. She is concerned about the oppression of black people in the United States throughout history, and uses her art to represent their continued existence and legacy.

Afatasi is a welder, metal sculptor, seamstress, fashion and textile designer, and mixed media conceptual artist based in Hunters Point. Her work has been shown in San Francisco, London, and Auckland. She also teaches a genealogy course rooted in the African diaspora caused by slavery, allowing students to trace their families.

Duyst-Akpem teaches Afrofuturism courses at the School of the Art Institute of Chicago. She is a Fellow of the National Endowment for the Humanities. Her work focuses on nature and explores diverse themes related to African religion, climate change, and sustainability.

== Exhibition ==
At the entrance to the SFO Museum gallery in the terminal, a large image of mOTHERboard (2024), by Nettrice Gaskins, serves as the main exhibition signage. "Women of Afrofuturism" appears in large white lettering in the lower left corner. Gaskins describes the work as a play on the word "mother", combining an image of a motherboard, which plays a central role in general-purpose computers, with an image of a mother in the foreground, symbolizing women's central role in the family.

The SFO Museum said it used the image of mOTHERboard, which features a woman looking in the direction of the gallery entrance, as a way to invite visitors into the exhibition. The gallery is described as both an "intimate" space and a kind of "hallway". Once inside the gallery, visitors are guided along a single wall containing four bays, each featuring one or more interpretive panels on the left side of the gallery space. (Note: All four bays are clearly visible in the San Francisco Chronicle article about the AI controversy.)

External images
- mOTHERboard (2024)
- The Blueprint (2024)
- THERE ARE BLACK PEOPLE IN THE FUTURE (2025)
- America's Outta Pocket ensemble with space helmet (2023)
- Osanyin Cape with collar and wristlets (2020)
- Afro-Surrealist Carnival (series) (2023)

The first bay features the work of Celia C. Peters. A large digital collage printed on plastic as a lenticular image (The Blueprint, 2024) transforms into three different scenes as visitors move around it. Lenticular printing uses tiny lenses to create an optical illusion. (Note: "Lenticular printing employs technology that appears to make the image change and move. View the portrait from the left, center, and right to watch it transform." Celia C. Peters interpretive display, Women of Afrofuturism.) The work depicts a woman with blue skin and blue lipstick looking over her shoulder. Depending on whether the viewer is facing the image from the left, center, or right, her skin turns from blue to green, her eyes close, she smiles, and the background changes color.

Peters designed the woman to appear as a futuristic Afronaut. The original image is based on an old photograph of an unknown African woman taken in the 1900s. Curator Nicole Mullen describes the work as one that serves to welcome visitors to the exhibition. Below it, an interpretive display incorporates a video screen showing a six-minute scene from Godspeed (2021), an animated proof of concept film by Peters.

A main introductory panel on the same wall follows the first exhibit, explaining the meaning of Afrofuturism to visitors, describing the pioneers of the movement, its writers and musicians, and the modern artists featured in the current exhibition.

The second bay follows the introductory panel and features the work of science fiction writer Octavia E. Butler, known for her work the Parable of the Sower (1993). The curators refer to Butler as the "mother" of Afrofuturism, noting her influence among Black writers and artists. Book covers from Afrofuturist women writers are shown in the same space, including a graphic novel adaptation of Butler's work and an issue of World of Wakanda, a Black Panther spin-off created by Black women.

The second bay also showcases the generative AI art of Gaskins, and the work of musician Alice Coltrane. Featured items include Afrofuturist cultural and technological artifacts such as an Aztec 600 typewriter, a JVC 3241 Videosphere television, an Electrohome record player and stand, and album covers related to Afrofuturist women musicians. Generative AI art by Gaskins includes portraits of Katherine Johnson, the first African-American woman to work as a NASA scientist, and Mae Jemison, the first African-American woman to travel into space.

The third bay features the work of Alisha B. Wormsley and her project, "There Are Black People in the Future". The project began in 2012, when she reproduced the statement in a Black community in Pittsburgh. The exhibit features a reproduction of the statement in the form of a billboard. In 2017, Wormsley installed large versions of this billboard in the neighborhood of East Liberty during a period of gentrification; it was later removed against the objections of the community, sparking a movement that reproduced it all over the United States, as well as in London, Accra, and Doha.

When the billboard was initially taken down, Wormsley released a statement explaining how she came to the project: "It started out as a black nerd sci-fi joke. A response to the absence of non-white faces in science fiction films and TV. Very much a response to many Afrofuturist writings, like Florence Okoye's: 'After all, to quote musician Gabriel Teodros: "If we don't write ourselves into the future, we get written out of tomorrow as well."' (Note: Okoye quotes Teodros, who spoke these words at TEDxRainier (2013). A decade earlier, Octavia Butler told Charlie Rose: "You got to make your own worlds. You got to write yourself in". This quote is reproduced in the second bay.)...Afrofuturism dares to suggest that not only will black people exist in the future, but that we will be makers and shapers of it, too."

The third bay also features a section and photograph about curatorial consultant Ingrid LaFleur.

The fourth bay features the work of Afatasi the Artist and D. Denenge Duyst-Akpem. Three of Afatasi's fashion designs are shown: Tunic and floral space helmet (2022), America's Outta Pocket ensemble with space helmet (2023), and Planetary ensemble (2024). Additionally, two of Afatasi's sculptures also appear: a metal and plastic sculpture titled Stop for the future sign (2023), and a hanging sculpture called Star Gate 2 (2024).

Three separate works by D. Denenge Duyst-Akpem are shown featuring her leaf garment collection. One of her capes, Osanyin Cape with collar and wristlets, 2020, is present in the gallery, while a second, Camo Cape (Self-Portrait in Camo Cape, 2022) only appears as a photo. A third work, Osanyin Leaf backdrop (2020), sits behind and frames the Osanyin Cape, both of which are influenced by the design of natural camouflage and the Ọsanyin nature god of the Yoruba people in West Africa. AFRIFUTURI 02022020 (2020), Duyst-Akpem's self-published book about her work, is featured in the second bay about Afrofuturist women writers.

Gaskins's Afro-Surrealist Carnival (series) (2023) closes out the exhibition, appearing toward the exit. It draws from styles and movements associated with Afrofuturism, Afro-surrealism, and Italian Futurism. The work was created using DeepDream and Midjourney.

== Reaction ==
Technology YouTuber and content creator JerryRigEverything posted a 61-second YouTube Short about the Women of Afrofuturism exhibition while walking through the SFO airport in early December 2025. In the video, he argued that "...not only are they not using real artists or real women or real women of color, but the whole exhibit is actually generated by AI...We have an exhibit that's supposed to be promoting women of color and artists, and none of those three things are human in the exhibit." The video was amplified on Reddit, with the exhibition becoming part of the discourse related to artificial intelligence controversies.

Five days after the video went viral, the San Francisco Chronicle reported that the accusations which sparked the controversy were mistaken. (Note: Aidin Vaziri: "The claims spread quickly — and inaccurately.") "While Gaskins uses AI-assisted tools," the newspaper wrote, "the exhibition includes multiple artists whose work is entirely human-made." Responding to the controversy, SFO Museum director and chief curator Jennifer McCabe said, "The biggest misconception by the public is that the museum somehow replaced the work of artists and instead used AI to create artworks. This could not be further from the truth...It is our practice to work with artists directly on exhibitions, which is what we did in this instance."

Of the 25 artworks by five Black women artists in the exhibition, approximately eight (seven featured and one supplemental work) use AI-assisted and AI-generated art, (Note: All eight works are by Nettrice Gaskins. See the "Works" section for the list.) all of which were created by Gaskins. Additionally, 17 works in the exhibition (ten featured and seven supplemental works) do not use AI, (Note: All 17 works are listed in the "Works" section.) including all of the art by Celia C. Peters, Alisha B. Wormsley, Afatasi the Artist, and D. Denenge Duyst-Akpem.

SFO Museum visitor surveys showed that more than 90% of visitors reacted positively to the exhibit. Gaskins believes that some people misunderstand how artists use these tools. "My intention," she says, "is to go beyond what human hands can do." Gaskins notes that artists have been using computer generated art for more than five decades, with pioneers like Harold Cohen paving the way. (Note: Cohen's work was featured at the Whitney Museum in 2024, almost a decade after his death. Gaskins spoke in detail about Cohen's pioneering work in generative art at the Berkeley Center for New Media in 2023 in her lecture "Generative Art and Deep Learning AI".) Cohen was one of the first to use robots to generate paintings in the 1970s. "Computers do not make art, people do", Gaskins told the Chronicle. "Artists who use AI are using it as a tool, not to automate or do all the work."

According to Bao Li, the SFO Museum associate curator of public engagement, Gaskins drew the portraits before using generative AI applications to augment their design. These applications include text-to-image prompts and neural style transfer algorithms. For Black History Month 2026, CBS News Bay Area featured a segment on the exhibition showing Gaskins's process, beginning with a photo which she then sketched before applying AI to get her desired output.

== Playlist ==
Women of Afrofuturism provides a QR code in the first exhibition bay linking to a curated, abridged Spotify playlist called Women in Afrofuturism. (Note: The abridged SFO Museum playlist for this exhibition features 11 songs, totaling approximately one hour of music. The extended playlist, linked only from the SFO Museum account on Spotify, has 98 songs lasting approximately eight hours and thirty minutes.) The playlist features the music of musicians mentioned in the exhibition. Gallery visitors are encouraged to listen to the playlist on their personal devices during their visit. (Note: "Listen along to our Spotify playlist, which features the recording artists highlighted in this exhibition." Celia C. Peters interpretive display, Women of Afrofuturism.)

- "Journey in Scandinavia" (Alice Coltrane, Pharoah Sanders)
- "Tomorrow" (Grace Jones)
- "Window Seat" (Erykah Badu)
- "High Priestess" (Santigold)
- "Dance of Many Hands" (Nicole Mitchell)
- "Act 2 - Circuit Break" (Moor Mother)
- "Lady Marmalade" (LaBelle)
- "Dance or Die (feat. Saul Williams)" (Janelle Monáe)
- "They Say I'm Different" (Betty Davis)
- "Universal Consciousness" (Alice Coltrane)
- "My Favorite Things" (Alice Coltrane)

== Works ==
Grayed out text indicates supplementary works that are reproduced in the exhibition and appear only as part of the interpretive display case in each exhibition bay, but do not appear as featured works on the gallery walls. The superscript ^{AI} identifies works created with the assistance of artificial intelligence, in whole or in part.

Celia C. Peters: The Blueprint (2024); Godspeed (Proof of Concept) (2021); Nettrice Gaskins: mOTHERboard (2024)^{AI}; Octavia E. Butler (2024)^{AI}; Katherine Johnson (2024)^{AI}; Lt. Uhura (Nichelle Nichols) (2024)^{AI}; Mae Jemison (2024)^{AI}; Alice Coltrane (2024)^{AI}; Nettrice Gaskins Self-Portrait (2021)^{AI}; Afro-Surrealist Carnival (series) (2023)^{AI}; Alisha B. Wormsley: THERE ARE BLACK PEOPLE IN THE FUTURE (2025); THERE ARE BLACK PEOPLE IN THE FUTURE (2025); The Last Billboard (2017)	Afatasi the Artist: Tunic and floral space helmet (2022); What You Lookin' At? (2022); Stop for the future sign (2023); Star Gate 2 (2024); America's Outta Pocket ensemble with space helmet (2023); Planetary ensemble (2024); Afatasi the Artist (2024); Afatasi the Artist's Futurism Fashion Experience (2024); Afatasi the Artist's Futurism Fashion Experience (2024); D. Denenge Duyst-Akpem: Osanyin Cape with collar and wristlets (2020); Osanyin Leaf backdrop (2020); Self-Portrait in Camo Cape (2022)
