= Lina Iris Viktor =

British visual artist

- Notable work: A Haven. A Hell. A Dream Deferred
- Movement: Afrofuturism; Africanfuturism
- Website: https://www.linaviktor.com/

Lina Iris Viktor is an English visual artist who is known for her paintings, sculptures, photographs, and performance art. She moved to the south of Italy in 2022. Viktor combines ancient and modern art forms to create multimedia paintings. She does this by combining an ancient technique called gilding with photography and painting to create “symbols and intricate patterns." She overlays 24-karat gold over dark canvases to create works with “layers of light”. Allison K. Young in Haven. A Hell. A Dream Deferred says that these multimedia paintings suggest “the socio-political and historical preconceptions surrounding ‘blackness’ and its universal implications”. The New York Times described her paintings as "queenly self-portraits with a futuristic edge".

== Biography ==
Lina Iris Viktor was born to parents from Liberia, West Africa. Her parents left Liberia to move to the U.K. because of the First Liberian Civil War. Viktor traveled frequently as a child and for numerous years lived in Johannesburg, South Africa.

She studied film at Sarah Lawrence College and photography at the School of Visual Arts in New York City. Lina Iris Viktor in 2016 was thinking about creating artwork that corresponds to the history of Liberia, but it took around a year for her to articulate this concept because of how “complex and misunderstood” Liberia is. In 2017, The New Orleans Museum of Art contacted Viktor for a solo show exhibition that “speaks to interconnected histories of West Africa and the American South”. Viktor’s solo exhibition is titled A Haven. A Hell. A Dream Deferred. In an Interview with Ekow Eshun, he talks about inviting different artists including Lina Iris Viktor in 2022 to be a part of a show titled The Black Fantastic located at the Hayward Gallery in London. Eshun in this interview said that Viktor came to visit the Hayward Gallery and was immediately inspired to create "two new sculptural works and three new paintings for the show".

In 2018, Viktor was involved in a legal dispute with Kendrick Lamar involving appropriation of her imagery for the video for "All the Stars" by SZA and Lamar. The dispute was settled.

She is represented by Pilar Corrias, London.

== Art ==
Viktor integrates painting, sculpture, photography, sculpture, and gilding to portray the history of Liberia while also investigating "the relationship between art, prophecy, and spiritual belief". Viktor is inspired by source imagery including "astronomy, Aboriginal dream paintings, African textiles, and West and Central African myth and cosmology". Specifically in her series A Haven. A Hell. A Dream Deferred she discusses the "mythic history" of Liberia. In a book titled Africa State of Mind Ekow Eshun says Viktor "knits together events and images both factual and fantastical, [and] conjures Liberia as an uneasy utopia, both a paradise lost and cautionary tale of pathology of colonization". In Viktor's multi media paintings the central figure pay homage to the figure of Libyan Sibyl. The Libyan Sibyl is a classical mythological figure that can depict the future. The Libyan Sibyl figure is also "used as a common motif in the art and literature of the American abolitionist movement". Viktor uses iconography from Liberia and the United States in hopes to emphasize "the depth and complexity of African history and experience".

== Notable works ==
=== A Haven. A Hell. A Dream Deferred Series ===
In this series Viktor creates mixed media paintings to depict the history of Liberia. Throughout the series she incorporates bold red lines to mimic "tropical foliage" and geometric patterns to imitate "the crimson stripes of the Liberia's flag". She uses colors red, white, and blue "to invoke the shared national iconography of both Liberia and the United States". Viktor says she wants to create a different perspective on "lost narratives" that connect the United States to Liberia. The central figure in these paintings represent the Libyan Sibyl, and this figure is wearing "patterns of Dutch Wax fabrics". The title of this series is inspired by Montage of a Dream Deferred by Langston Hughes. The phrase "A Dream Deferred" is supposed to represent "the unrealized dreams and broken promises that punctuate Black American experience". Viktor hopes that this series educates others about the misconceptions of Liberia and the importance of the African Diaspora and its cultural history.

==== Third ====
This is part of the A Haven. A Hell. A Dream Deferred Series and depicts a Libyan Sibyl "beside Liberia's flag, as if posing for a formal portrait". Viktor experiments with portraiture and "uses textile patterns as backdrops" and uses similar photographic compositions from West African photographers like Oumar Ka, Seydou Keita, Malick Sidibe, and Mamma Casset.

==== Fourth ====
This is part of the A Haven. A Hell. A Dream Deferred Series and illustrates a Libyan Sibyl figure holding a book in her left hand. The book, the robe, and the figures' posture are iconographic elements that pay tribute to the mosaic floor in the Siena Cathedral, titled Sibylla Lybica.

== Solo exhibitions ==
- 2014: Arcadia, Gallery 151, New York, NY
- 2017: Black Exodus: Act I — Materia Prima, Amar Gallery, London, United Kingdom
- 2018: The Black Ark, The Armory Show | Mariane Ibrahim Gallery, New York, New York
- 2018: A Haven. A Hell. A Dream Deferred, New Orleans Museum of Art, New Orleans, Louisiana
- 2019: Some Are Born To Endless Night — Dark Matter, Autograph ABP, London

== Group exhibitions ==
- 2014: Intangible Beauty: Beautiful Women and The Endless Void, Kasher Potamkin, New York, New York.
- 2016: Africa Forecast: Fashioning Contemporary Life, Spelman College Museum of Fine Art, Atlanta, Georgia
- 2016: As The Cosmos Unfolds, The Cob Gallery, London, United Kingdom.
- 2016: Sisters of The Moon, Kentucky Museum of Art and Craft, Louisville, Kentucky.
- 2016: The Woven Arc, The Cooper Gallery Harvard University, Cambridge, Massachusetts.
- 2016: Art of Jazz: Form, Performance, Notes, The Cooper Gallery and Harvard Art Museums, Harvard University, Cambridge, Massachusetts.
- 2017: Lines, Motions, and Rituals, Magnan Metz, New York, New York.
- 2017: Back Stories, Mariane Ibrahim Gallery, Seattle, Washington.
- 2018: Re-Significations: European Blackamoors, Africana Readings, Zisa Zona Arti Contemporanee (ZAC) Manifesta European Contemporary Art Biennial 12, Palermo, Italy
- 2018: The Artsy Vanguard, Dior and Bergdorf Goodman, New York, New York.
- 2018: Hopes Springing High — Gifts Of Art By African American Artists, Crocker Art Museum, Sacramento, CA
- 2022: In the Black Fantastic, Hayward Gallery, London
