= Ytasha L. Womack =

American author

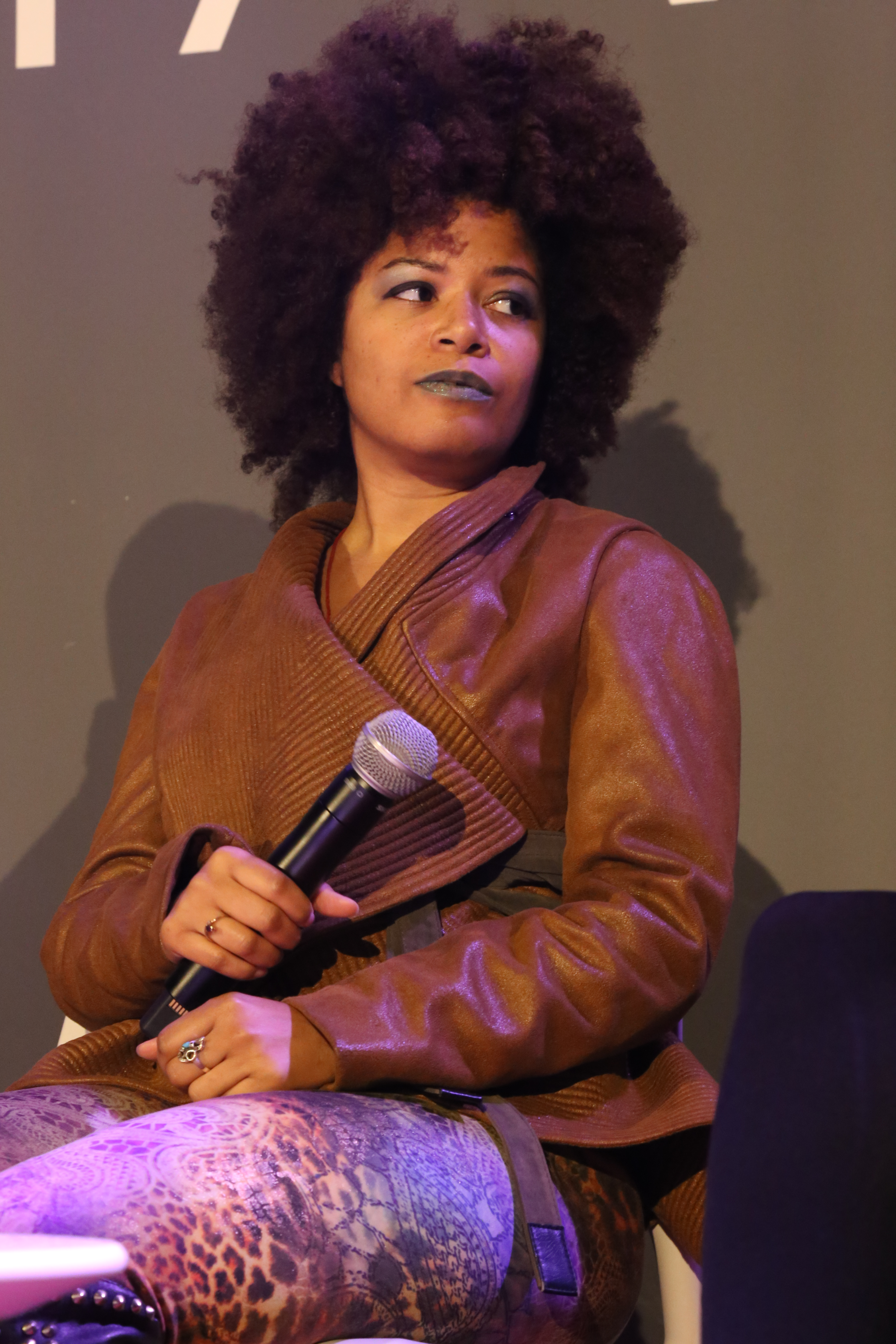
- Arizona State University, December 2015
- Born: January 22; Chicago, Illinois, U.S.
- Occupations: Writer, filmmaker, and cultural critic
- Website: Official website

Ytasha L. Womack is an American writer, filmmaker, and cultural critic recognized for her work in Afrofuturism, race, and speculative fiction. She is most known for her book Afrofuturism: The World of Black Sci-Fi and Fantasy Culture (2013). Womack blends storytelling with academic analysis to provide perspectives on how Black culture interacts with ideas of the future and technology.

In addition to being an author, Womack has made contributions to film, with various of her short films being showcased at festivals. She is also a frequent speaker and educator, lecturing at universities like DePaul and Rutgers on Afrofuturism, speculative fiction, and cultural studies.

Womack’s work is a mix of writing, film, and cultural analysis. This has made her a well-known voice in Afrofuturism. Her work contributes to discussions about race, technology, and the future, and she is recognized as an influential figure in contemporary cultural conversations.

== Education ==
Womack was born and raised in Chicago. After graduating from Whitney M. Young Magnet High School, Womack attended Clark Atlanta University where she received a bachelor’s in Mass Media Arts. She continued her education at Columbia College Chicago where she Studied Arts, Media, and Entertainment Management. Additionally, she holds a certificate in Metaphysics Studies (Better Living) from the Johnnie Coleman Institute.

== Career ==
Womack is a writer, most known for her book Afrofuturism: The World of Black Sci-Fi and Fantasy Culture, a novel that explores the intersection of African American culture and speculative genres. The book is deemed as an overview of Afrofuturism by members of the community, as it explores the intersection of science fiction, futurism, and culture. The book is also a 2014 Locus Awards Non Fiction Finalist.

== Works ==
=== Novels ===
- Beats, Rhymes and Life: What We Love & Hate About Hip Hop (2007)
- Post Black: How a New Generation is Refining African American Identity (2010)
- Afrofuturism: The World of Black Sci-Fi and Fantasy Culture (2013)
- Rayla 2212 (2014)
- Rayla 2213 (2016)
- Black Panther: A Cultural Exploration (2023)

=== Films ===
Year	Title	Credited as	Notes
2001	Tupac: Before I Wake	Co-producer	Documentary
2004	Love Shorts	Producer and writer	Drama
2006	The Engagement: My Phamily BBQ 2	Director	Comedy
2017	A Love Letter to the Ancestors From Chicago	Director	Afrofuturist dance film
2018	Couples Night	Screenwriter	Romantic comedy
