= D. Denenge Duyst-Akpem =

American conceptual artist

- Occupations: Conceptual artist, professor

D. Denenge Duyst-Akpem is an Afrofuturist artist, writer, and educator. She is an adjunct assistant professor at the School of the Art Institute of Chicago in the Department of Art History, Theory, and Criticism and Low-Residency MFA Program; and founder of Denenge Design. Her work bridges the disciplines of design, ritual, and ecology. Duyst-Akpem describes her work thus: "As a scholar and practitioner, I utilize the teaching of Afro-Futurism as a methodology of (Black) liberation. The foundation of this is exercising the visionary and imagination muscles in sculpting new futures that affirm the present and are rooted in the past."

== Education ==
Duyst-Akpem was born in Mkar, Benue State, Nigeria. She holds a BA from Smith College and an MFA from the School of the Art Institute of Chicago.

== Performances and exhibitions ==
Her work has been presented at Fe Gallery, Philadelphia, Art Loop Open, Chicago, THE LAB, NYC, the Museum of Contemporary Art and Hyde Park Art Center in Chicago. Her performance High Priestess of the Intergalactic Federation, Special Envoy to Mars was presented at the Decolonizing Mars symposium at the United States Library of Congress 2018 as part of the Becoming Interplanetary symposium held there. This interactive performance-lecture-experience was also presented at the ICA in London. The ICA performance was in response to an exhibition titled Temporal Deprogramming and intended to engage the audience in questioning what it means to reach for the stars, become interplanetary, and to be human.

On February 2, 2020, Duyst-Akpem launched the AFRIFUTURI 02022020 monograph and The Camo Coat Collection at Blanc Gallery, Chicago.

== Awards ==
Duyst-Akpem was a recipient of a National Endowment for the Humanities Fellowship for the Institute on Black Aesthetics and Sacred Systems. She has also received both a Marion Kryczka Excellence in Teaching Award and Teaching Award for Excellence in Diversity and Inclusion from SAIC. Duyst-Akpem was a 2017 Place Lab Fellow, Rebuild Foundation with U-Chicago Harris School of Public Policy. She was also a 2022 La Becque Laureate.
