= Afrofuturism =

Cultural aesthetic and philosophy

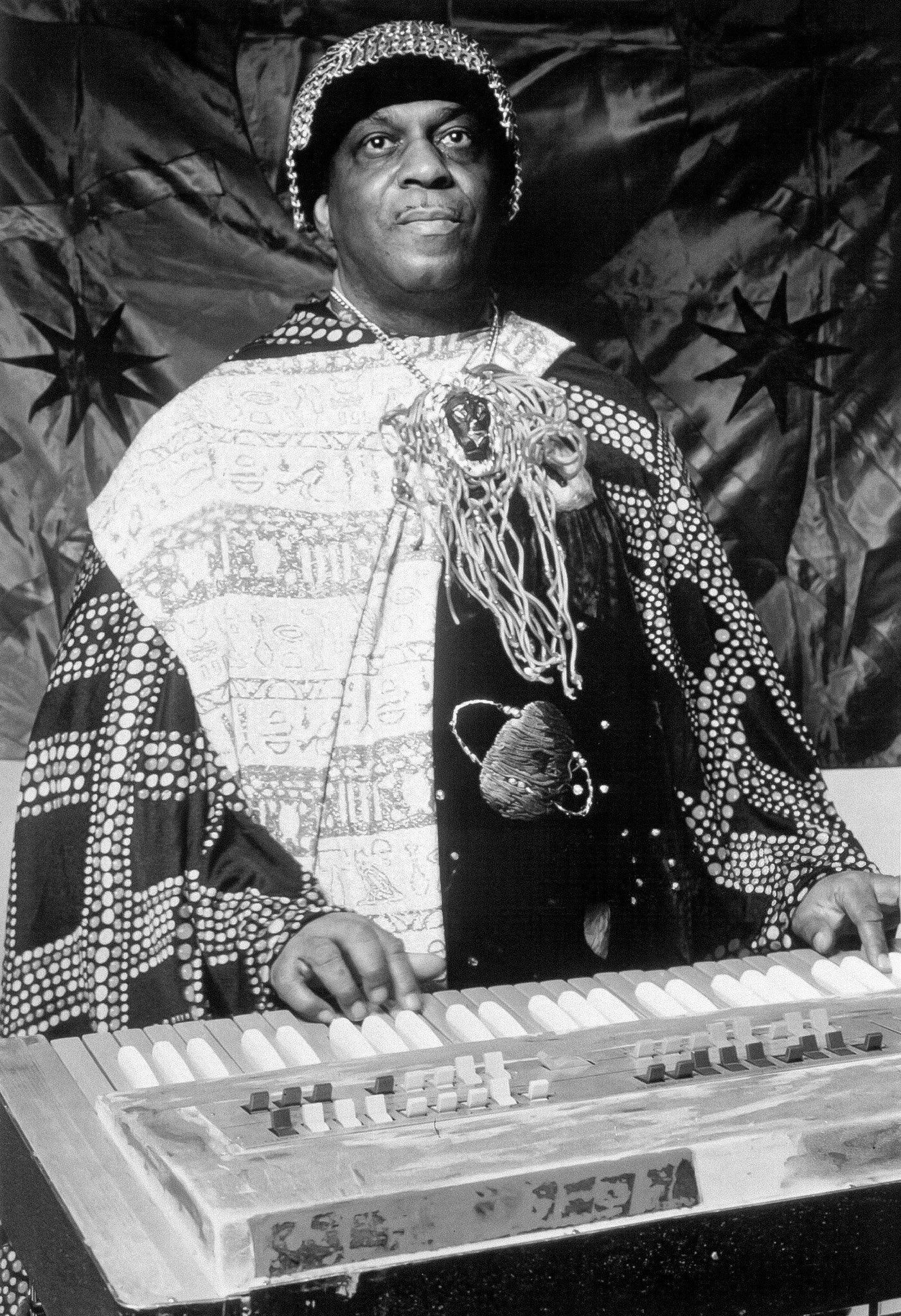
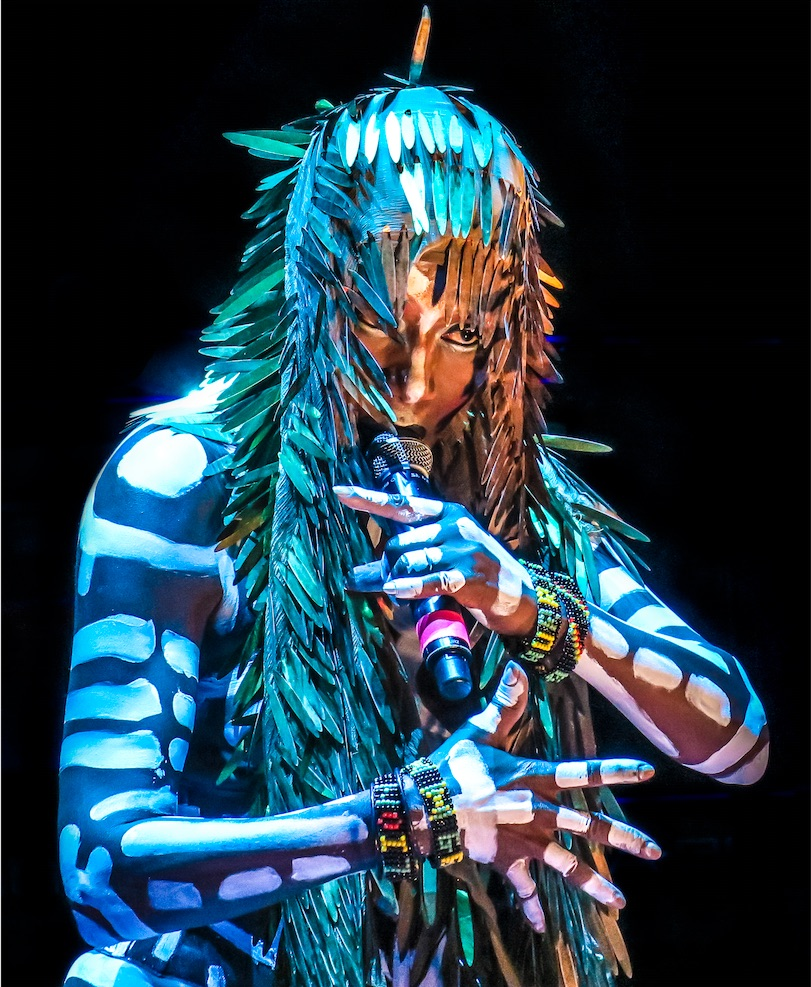
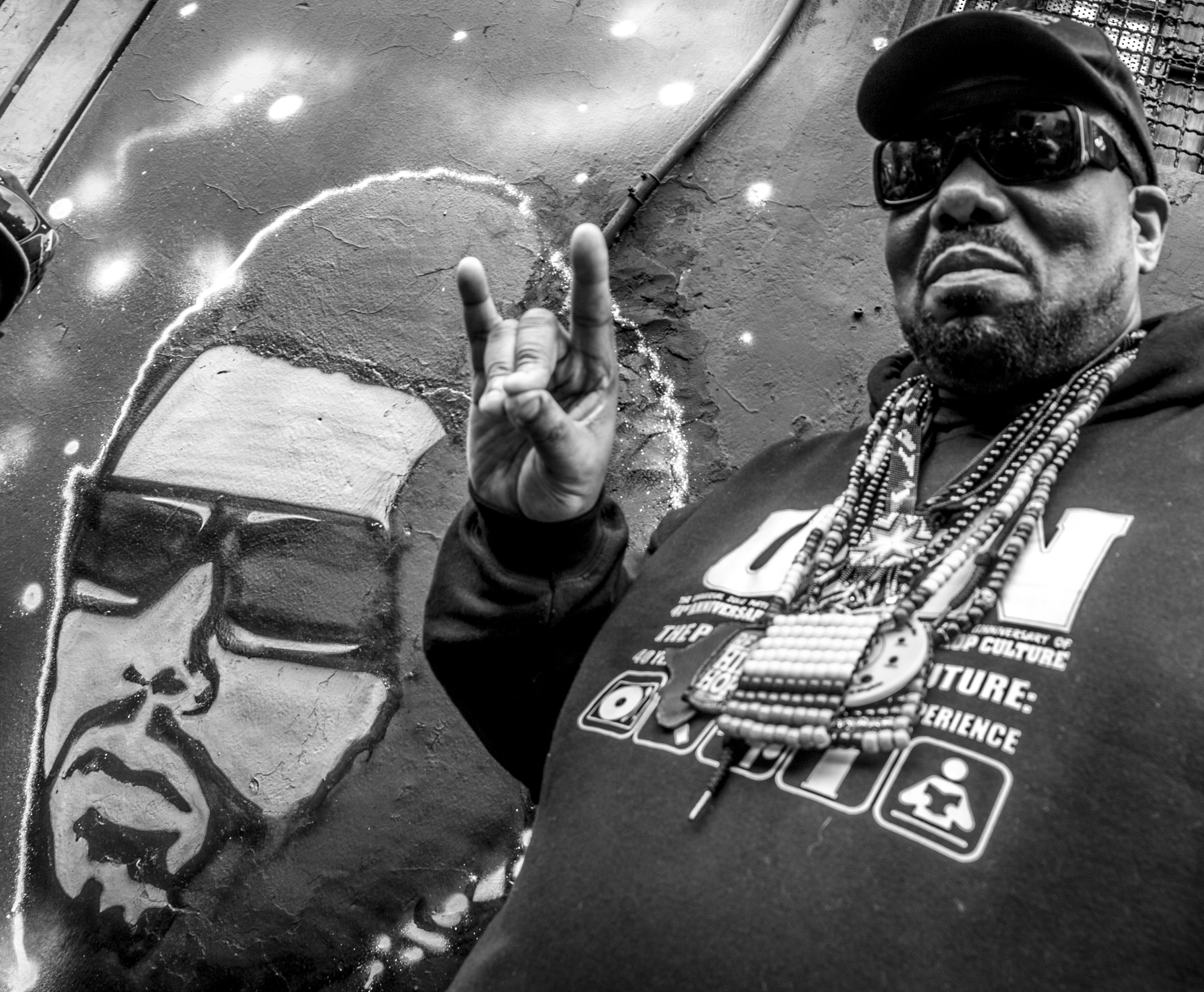
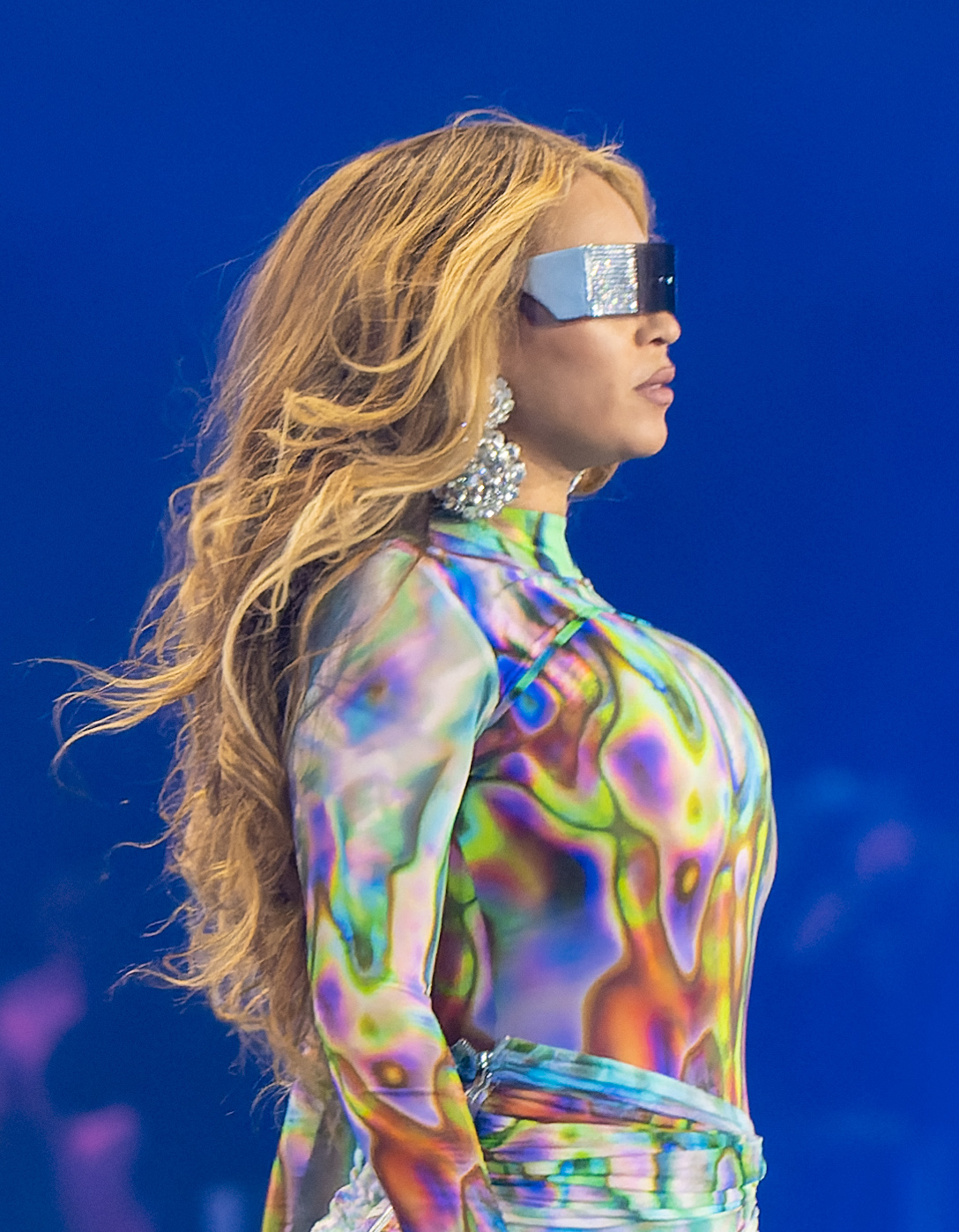
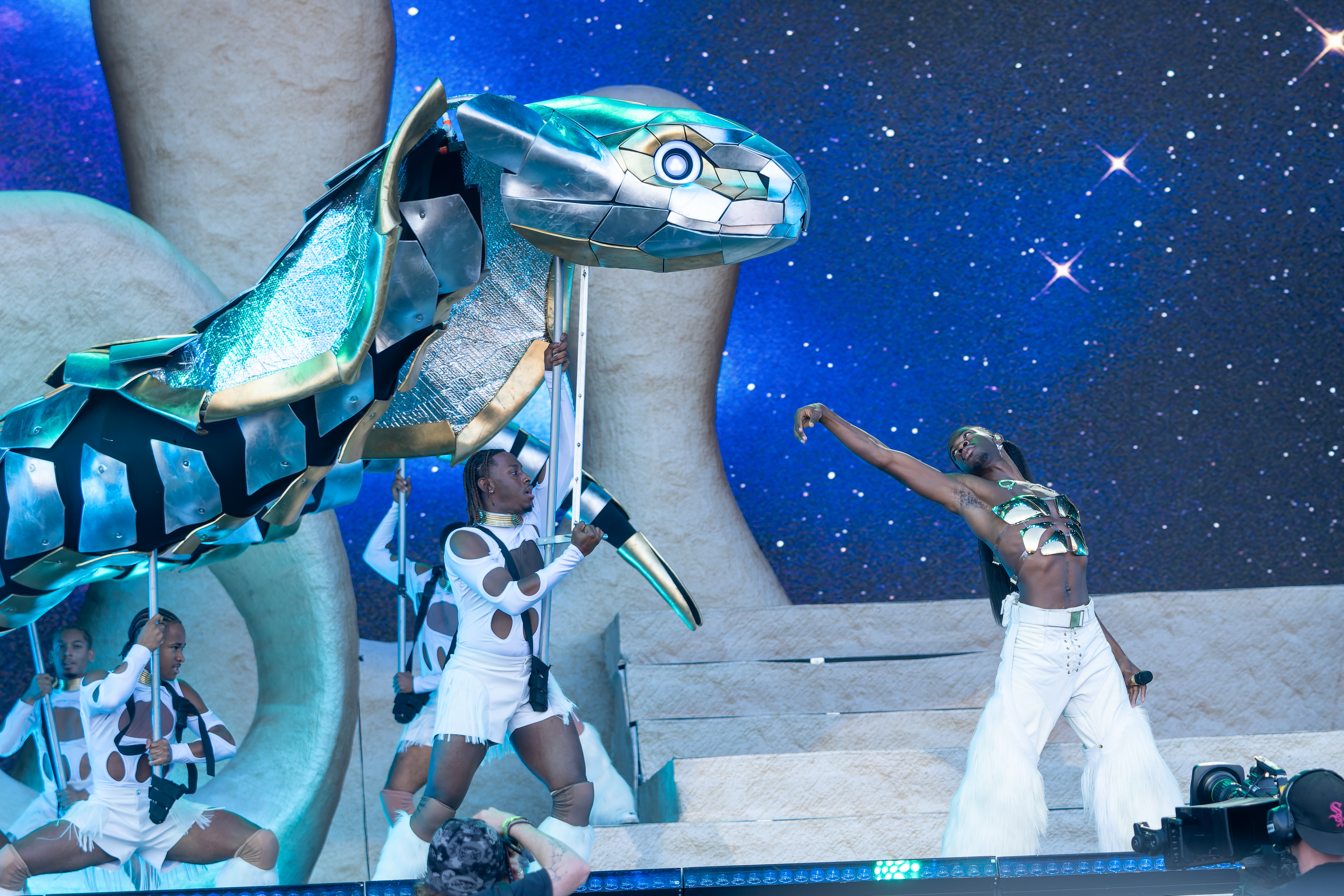
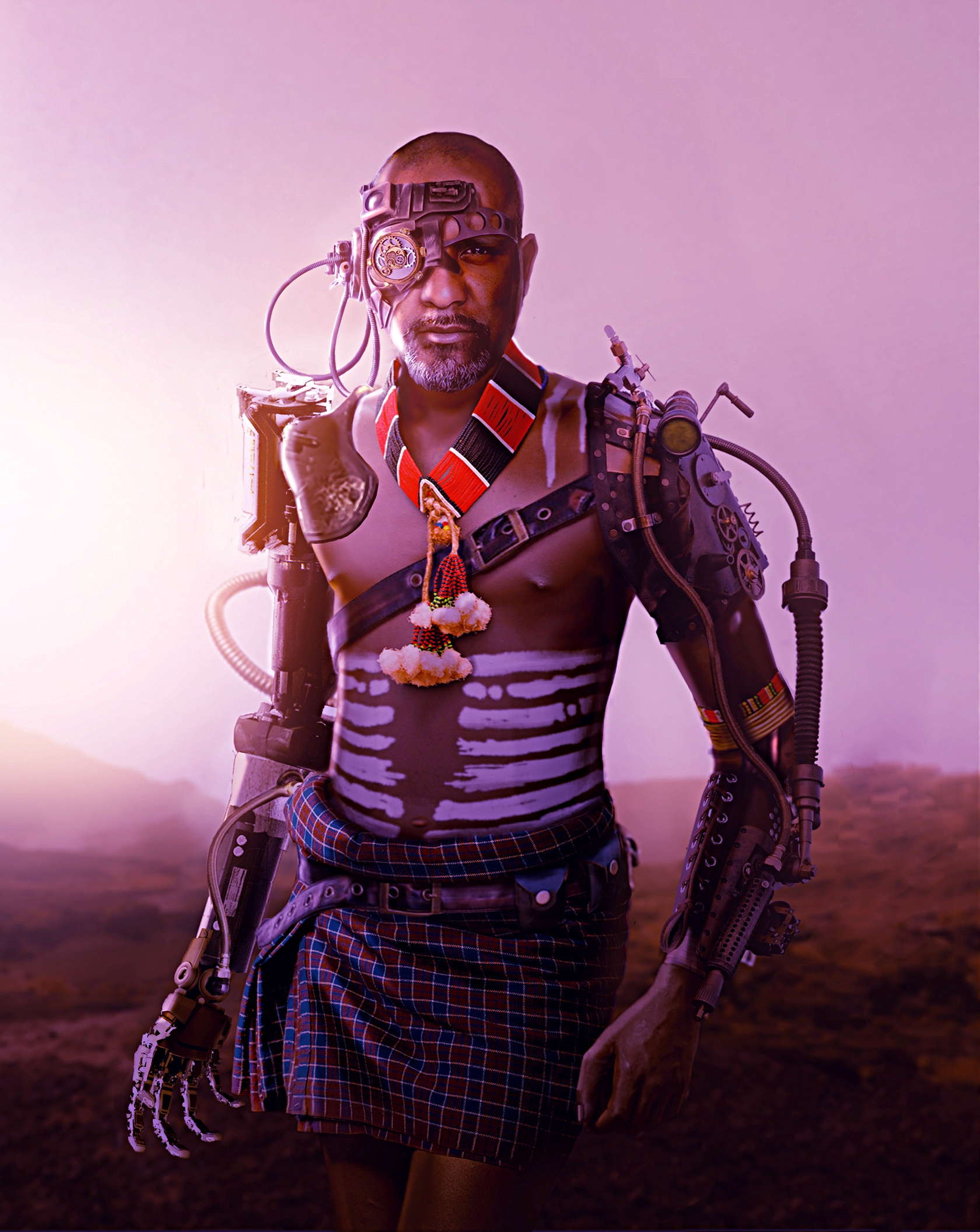
Clockwise from top left: Sun Ra, Grace Jones, Beyoncé, a work by Fanuel Leul, Lil Nas X, Afrika Bambaataa

Afrofuturism is a cultural aesthetic that explores the intersection of the African diaspora culture with science and technology. It addresses themes and concerns of the African diaspora through technoculture and speculative fiction, encompassing a range of media and artists with a shared interest in envisioning Black futures that stem from Afro-diasporic experiences. While Afrofuturism is most commonly associated with science fiction, it can also encompass other speculative genres such as Afro-fantasy, fantasy, alternate history and magic realism, and can also be found in music.

The term was coined by American cultural critic Mark Dery in 1993 and explored in the late 1990s through conversations led by Alondra Nelson.

Ytasha L. Womack, writer of Afrofuturism: The World of Black Sci-Fi and Fantasy Culture, defines it as "an intersection of imagination, technology, the future and liberation". She also follows up with a quote by the curator Ingrid LaFleur, who defines it as "a way of imagining possible futures through a Black cultural lens". Kathy Brown paraphrases Bennett Capers' 2019 work in stating that Afrofuturism is about "forward thinking as well as backward thinking, while having a distressing past, a distressing present, but still looking forward to thriving in the future". Others have said that the genre is "fluid and malleable", bringing together technology, African culture, and "other influences".

Seminal Afrofuturistic works include the novels of Samuel R. Delany and Octavia Butler; the canvases of Jean-Michel Basquiat and Angelbert Metoyer, and the photography of Renée Cox; the cosmic avant-garde jazz of Sun Ra and his Arkestra; the explicitly extraterrestrial mythos of Parliament-Funkadelic; Earth, Wind and Fire with their overt Afrocentric symbolism, bold performance attire and hopeful visions of Black sovereignty; Herbie Hancock's partnership with Robert Springett and other visual artists, while developing his use of synthesizers. The Jonzun Crew, Warp 9, Deltron 3030, Kool Keith, and the Marvel Comics superhero Black Panther can also be cited.

== Timeline ==
=== 1970s ===
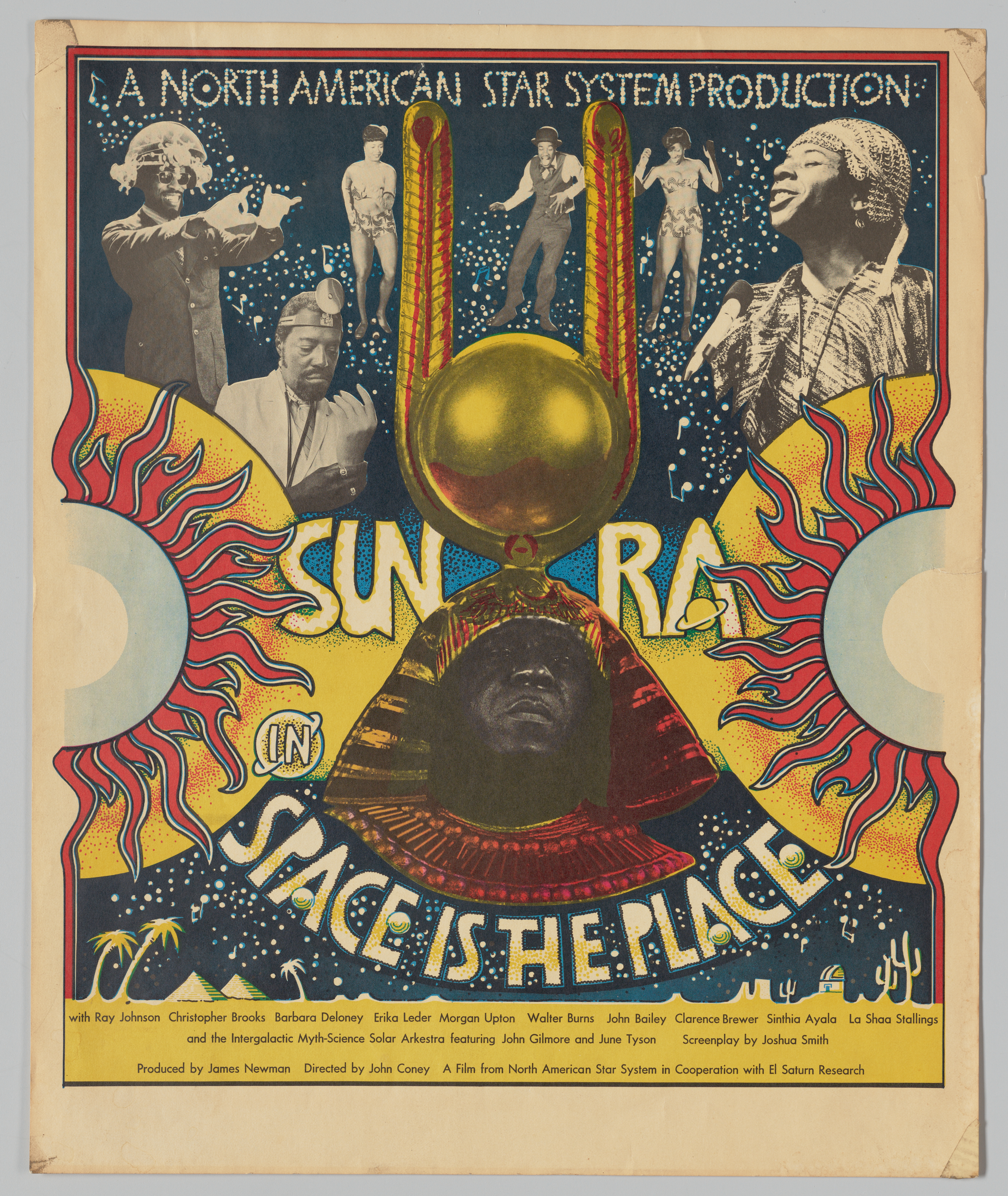
A 1974 film poster for "SPACE IS THE PLACE", a North American Star System Production starring Sun Ra and directed by John Coney.

Afrofuturism within music represents a diaspora of music that is non-traditional, focusing on the topic of Blackness, space, and technology.

It heavily features the artificial sounds of synthesizers and drum machines while incorporating lyrical themes of Black history and cultural pride, progress, spirituality, and science fiction.

One of the earliest examples of this aesthetic can be seen in the film Space Is the Place which depicts the free jazz band of Sun Ra involved in a science fiction plot where the musician starts preparing a group of young Black folks to colonize an outer planet, thus giving birth to a new afro-centric civilization in another planet.

Studies on Afrofuturistic music highlight the genre's challenging of sonic norms by blending elements found in Hip-Hop, Jazz, R&B, Funk, and Electronic music. Melting together different sounds and cultures with Afrofuturist music emphasizes the otherworldly, alternative nature that defines most Afrofuturist works. When performed live, the genre has been observed to combine distinct sounds and sound cultures across the African Diaspora. Jamaican-American party host, DJ Kool Herc, was a well-renowned DJ in the 1970s. He was one of the many disc jockeys on the 70s New York music scene responsible for mixing Jamaica's signature hefty, booming sound systems with R&B and Rap, bass-heavy African American genres. This combination maximized audience immersion and storytelling capabilities. Present-day Afrofuturistic musicians, such as Hip-Hop duo, Outkast, and Jazz composer, Nicole Mitchell, have traces of DJ Kool Herc's multi-cultural influences in their song arrangements and performances, utilizing his signature beat isolation and sound systems decades later.

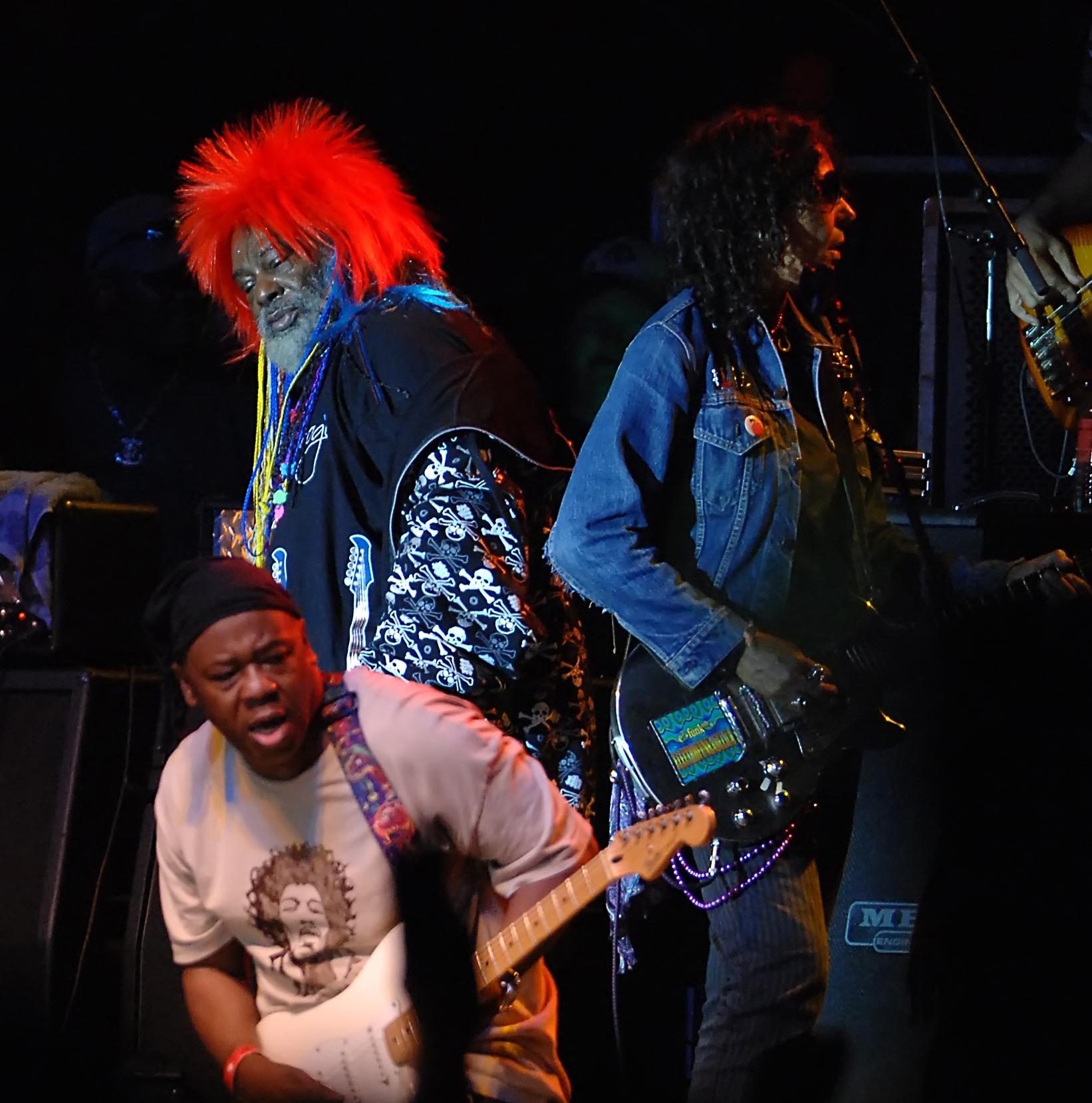
George Clinton (top left) performing with Parliament Funkadelic in July 2008

Afrofuturism was a label also retroactively applied to George Clinton and his bands Parliament and Funkadelic with his magnum opus Mothership Connection (1975) and the subsequent The Clones of Dr. Funkenstein, P-Funk Earth Tour, Funkentelechy Vs. the Placebo Syndrome, and Motor Booty Affair. George Clinton's work and appearance embody Afrofuturistic themes, sporting shiny, futuristic clothing both on and off stage, using sci-fi and cosmic album theming, and addressing Black history in his lyrics. Parliament's Mothership Connection was recognized for its themes of Black liberation and space in song arrangement, lyricism, and album visual aesthetics. The album cover art designed by Gribbit! depicts a Black person, dressed head-to-toe in chrome, hanging out of a UFO in space. The album also introduces two of Clinton's alter egos, the Lollipop Man and Star Child. Parliament Funkadelic's strong worldbuilding and establishment of individualism and escapism in their work have been partly attributed to their inclusion of characters and alter egos in their music. Alter egos remain a staple in Afrofuturistic music, with Janelle Monáe, a notable contemporary musical artist, incorporating characters and sci-fi storylines into their Afrofuturistic music and album visuals.

This also applies to Jimi Hendrix's work such as Electric Ladyland and "Third Stone from the Sun".

Provoked by Miles Davis to use electric keyboards, Herbie Hancock quickly developed his taste for gadgets into an appreciation for electric and synthesized sounds. He did this in his solo career throughout the 1970s and 1980s, at the same time adopting tribal names for his group and increasingly using electronics in his music, in a techno-primitive direction. His record covers were a very important element in this aesthetic, involving artists such as Robert Springett, Victor Moscoso and Nobuyuki Nakanishi.

In 1975, Japanese artist Tadanori Yokoo used elements of science fiction, along with Eastern subterranean myths, to depict an advanced civilization in his design of the cover art for African-American jazz musician Miles Davis's live album Agharta.

Other musicians typically regarded as working in or greatly influenced by the Afrofuturist tradition include reggae producers Lee "Scratch" Perry and Scientist, hip-hop artists Afrika Bambaataa and Tricky, electronic musicians Larry Heard, A Guy Called Gerald, Juan Atkins, Jeff Mills, Newcleus and Lotti Golden & Richard Scher, writers of "Light Years Away", described as a "cornerstone of early 80's beatbox afrofuturism".

During the 1980s, the burgeoning Detroit techno scene also developed a futurist vision specific to Detroit's suburban Black community.

A newer generation of artists are creating mainstream Afrofuturist music: for example, Janelle Monáe, Outkast, Missy Elliott, Solange, jazz composer Nicole Mitchell and Erykah Badu.

=== 1990s ===
In the early 1990s, Mark Dery, in his 1993 essay "Black to the Future", began to write about the features he saw as common in African-American science fiction. Dery dubbed this phenomenon Afrofuturism. Afrofuturist art has been written about by scholars like Alondra Nelson, Greg Tate, Tricia Rose, Kodwo Eshun, and others. In an interview, Alondra Nelson explained Afrofuturism as a way of looking at the subject position of Black people which covers themes of alienation and aspirations for a utopic future. The idea of "alien" or "other" is a theme often explored.

Additionally, Nelson says that discussions around race, access, and technology often bolster uncritical claims about a so-called "digital divide". Nelson is of the opinion that the digital divide overemphasizes the association of racial and economic inequality with limited access to technology, and that this association then begins to construct Blackness "as always oppositional to technologically driven chronicles of progress".

=== 2000s ===
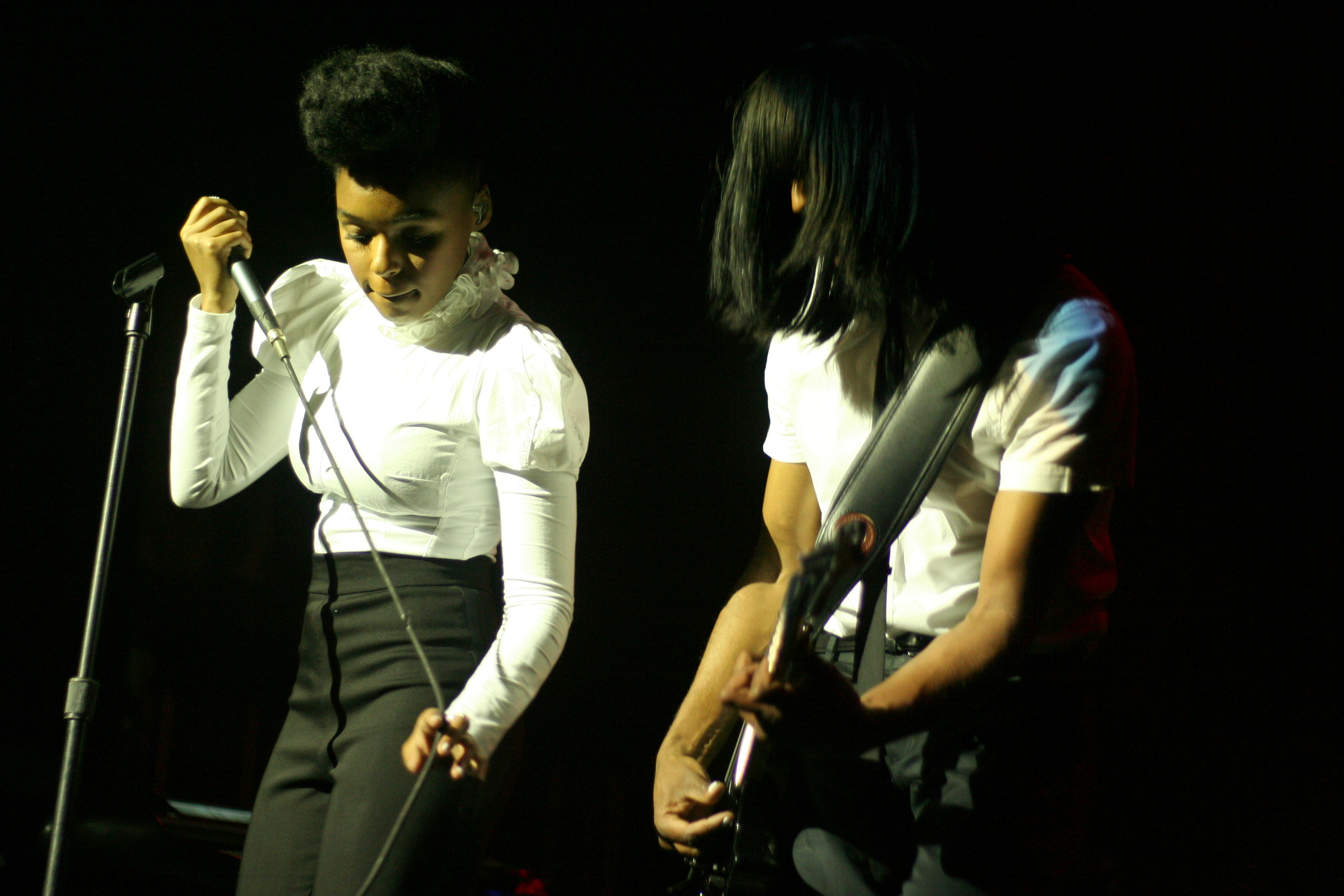
Janelle Monáe at The River, 25 September 2010

Contemporary Afrofuturism often explores metaphysical areas such as "cosmogony, cosmology, and speculative philosophy". A new generation of recording artists has embraced Afrofuturism through their music and fashion, including Solange Knowles, Rihanna, and Beyoncé. Other artists such as Erykah Badu, Missy Elliott and Janelle Monáe have expanded on these themes incorporating the use of cyborg and metallic visuals into their style.

Other 21st century musicians who have been characterized as Afrofuturist include singer FKA Twigs, musical duo Ibeyi, musical artist Spoek Mathambo, DJ/producer Ras G, and musician and filmmaker Flying Lotus.

Janelle Monáe's work emphasizes Afofuturist themes in urban contemporary music. Her notable works include the music videos "Prime Time" and "Many Moons", which explore the realms of slavery and freedom through the world of cyborgs and the fashion industry. She is credited with proliferating Afrofuturist funk into a new neo-Afrofuturism by use of her Metropolis-inspired alter-ego, Cindi Mayweather, who incites a rebellion against the Great Divide, a secret society, in order to liberate citizens who have fallen under their oppression. This ArchAndroid role reflects earlier Afrofuturistic figures Sun Ra and George Clinton, who created their own visuals as extraterrestrial beings rescuing African-Americans from the oppressive natures of Earth. Other influences include Blade Runner and Star Wars. Additionally, Monáe expanded contemporary Afrofuturist explorations to literary media. In 2022, Monáe released a companion to her 2018 album, Dirty Computer, called The Memory Librarian: And Other Stories of Dirty Computer.

Janelle Monáe uses technology to shed light on current social and political issues which is a key factor of Afrofuturism. This is evident in The Memory Librarian: and Other Stories by Dirty Computer. The first example of technology being used as a warning of what is to come if we do not proceed with caution and change our current socio-political climate, as well as a symbol for future and current ways of oppression. In this story, technology is used to wipe memories. Hence, its victims are reborn without knowing their past selves, only what they have been conditioned to believe according to the "Standards". Those who are in minority groups, such as BIPOC and the LGBTQ+, are seen as "Dirty" and must be wiped clean. Monáe expands on this on page fourteen when Seshet goes out with Alethia, "With New Dawn, any gender nonconformity is enough to get you a deviant code appended to your number-dirty computer, recommended for urgent cleaning- and she doesn't want to flag anyone tonight". The "urgent cleaning" that Seshet contemplates is wiping out one's memory. This is shown visually in her short film Dirty Computer. Monáe highlights how oppressors can easily use technology to control the oppressed.

The other two examples of how Monáe uses technology to showcase the relationship between humans is how AI is utilized in a more technologically advanced way as well as Seshet, the Director Memory Librarian, amongst others in an authoritative position able to access people's dreams and memories as a way to ensure they follow the "Standards" and are not classified as a "Dirty Computer".

Monáe's artistic vision extends beyond mere entertainment, serving as a reflection of present realities and a cautionary tale for the future. By embracing Afrofuturist themes and leveraging technology as a narrative device, Monáe invites audiences to confront uncomfortable truths and contemplate the potential consequences of unchecked power and systemic injustice. Through her music and storytelling, Monáe continues to use artistic expression to challenge societal norms for a more equitable and inclusive future.

Additional musical artists to emerge since the turn of the millennium regarded as Afrofuturist include dBridge, SBTRKT, Shabazz Palaces, Heavyweight Dub Champion, and Drexciya (with Gerald Donald).

Other artists include visual artists Hebru Brantley as well as contemporary artist Rashid Johnson, a Chicago native currently based in New York. In 2013, Chicago resident Ytasha L. Womack wrote the study Afrofuturism: The World of Black Science Fiction and Fantasy, and William Hayashi has published all three volumes of his Darkside Trilogy which tells the story of what happens in America when the country discovers African Americans secretly living on the backside of the moon since before the arrival of Neil Armstrong, an extreme vision of segregation imposed by technologically advanced Blacks.

Krista Franklin, a member of University of Chicago's Arts Incubator, is currently exploring the relation between Afrofuturism and the grotesque through her visual and written work with weaves and collected hair. Recently, she also created an audio narrative in collaboration with another Afrofuturist, Perpetual Rebel, called The Two Thousand and Thirteen Narrative(s) of Naima Brown, which explores the ideas of identity and transformation within the context of hair and African-American culture.

The movement has grown globally in the arts. Afrofuturist Society was founded by curator Gia Hamilton in New Orleans. Artists like Demetrius Oliver from New York, Cyrus Kabiru from Nairobi, Lina Iris Viktor from Liberia, famed Nigerian-American solar muralist, Shala., and Wanuri Kahiu of Kenya have all steeped their work in the cosmos or sci-fi.

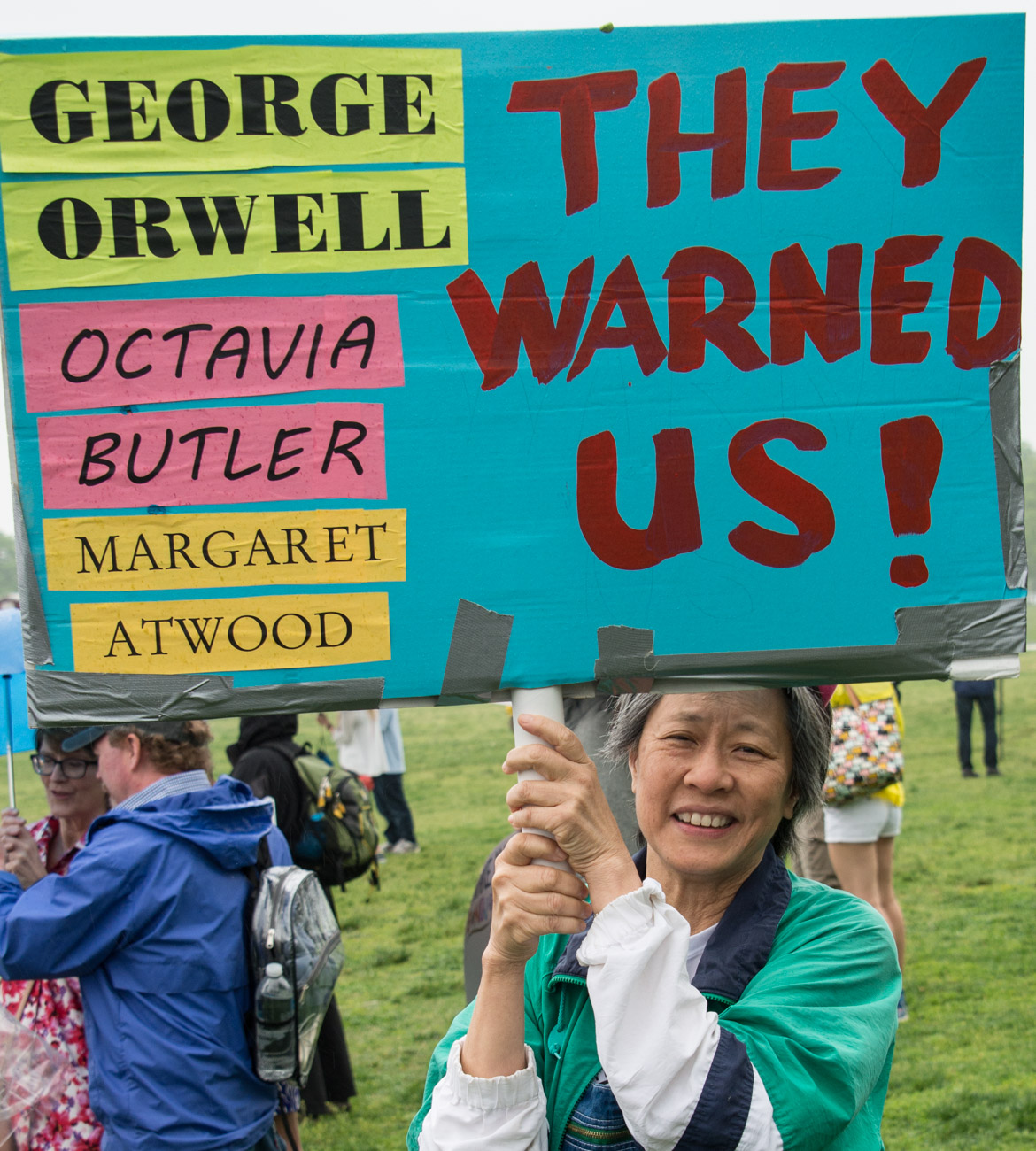
Sign at the March for Science 2017 in Washington, DC. stating, "George Orwell, Octavia Butler, and Margaret Atwood Warned Us!" (34078351001)

Today, Afrofuturism has been portrayed in popular movies like the feature film Black Panther (2018). American costume designer Ruth E. Carter brought her vision to life. To best represent her work, she borrowed ideas from true African designs. "To imagine the fictional African nation of Wakanda, without the influence of [European colonizers], Ms. Carter borrowed from indigenous people across the continent." In early February 2021, it was announced that the companies of Idris Elba and his wife, Sabrina Dhowre, would be developing an Afrofuturist adult animated, sci-fi, series, tentatively titled Dantai, for Crunchyroll, which would be about a time when biotech has "created an ever-widening gap between the haves and have-nots". The series was also described as an "afropunk sci-fi series". In an April 2021 interview with Den of Geek, Idris Elba he said the series is "mainly the brainchild" of his wife, who he described as a "super geek when it comes to anime." Russell Contreras, in Axios, noted that Afrofuturism is growing in popularity, even as some worry it will be co-opted, and Black writers announced in 2021, "Afrofuturist projects around gaming and virtual reality".

In February 2021, the Center for Afrofuturist Studies, located at Public Space One in Iowa City, celebrated its fifth anniversary, flourishing as a Black artist space, and occupied by four artists (Antoine Williams, Donté Hayes, Deborah Goffe, and André M. Zachery), embodying Afrofuturism, flexibly defining the term, as envisioning Black people in the future and how that "connects with science and technology and new discoveries" and how parts of Black history shape "the future, community, self-determination, [and] working towards a goal" according to the center's coordinator, Dellyssa Edinboro.

In February 2023, Megan Jordan of Rolling Stone argued that the series My Dad the Bounty Hunter is an "Afrofuturist marvel" which tells a futuristic and relatable story that "center[s] Black characters while expanding the audience's imagination", provides thoughts of what the world could be "in true Black sci-fi fashion", and normalizes "Black heroism for future generations". The series premiered the same month. It was later renewed for a second season, as stated in May 2023.

== Themes ==
=== Feminism ===
Jared Richardson's Attack of the Boogeywoman: Visualizing Black Women's Grotesquerie in Afrofuturism assesses how the aesthetic functions as a space for Black women to engage with the intersection of topics such as race, gender, and sexuality. The representation and treatment of Black female bodies is deconstructed by Afrofuturist contemporaries and amplified to alien and gruesome dimensions by artists such as Wangechi Mutu and Shoshanna Weinberger.

Beyoncé's 2016 short film Lemonade included feminist afrofuturism in its concept. The film featured music duo Ibeyi, artist Laolu Senbanjo, actresses Amandla Stenberg, Quvenzhané Wallis, and Zendaya, as well as YouTube singing stars Chloe x Halle, ballet dancer Michaela DePrince, and 2015 Sports Illustrated Sportsperson of the Year Serena Williams, and the sophisticated womanist poetry of Somali-British writer Warsan Shire. The mothers of Trayvon Martin (Sybrina Fulton), Michael Brown (Lesley McFadden), Eric Garner (Gwen Carr) are featured holding pictures of their deceased sons in homage to the importance of their lives.

=== The grotesque ===
In D. Scot Miller's Afro-Surreal Manifesto, Afro-Surrealism is juxtaposed with European surrealism, with European surrealism being empirical. It is consistent with Trey Ellis' essay, "The New Black Aesthetic" in that the art seeks to disturb. Afro-Futuristic art samples from old art pieces updating them with current images. This technique calls to the forefront those past images and the sentiments, memories, or ideas around them and combines them with new images in a way that those of the current generation can still identify. Afro-Futuristic artists seek to propose a deviant beauty, a beauty in which disembodiment is both inhumane, yet distinct; Afro-Futuristic artists speculate on the future, where Afro-Surrealism is about the present.

=== Alienation ===
Afrofuturism takes representations of the lived realities of Black people in the past and present, and reexamines the narratives to attempt to build new truths outside of the dominant cultural narrative. By analyzing the ways in which alienation has occurred, Afrofuturism works to connect the African diaspora with its histories and knowledge of racialized bodies. Space and aliens function as key products of the science fiction elements; Black people are envisioned to have been the first aliens by way of the Middle Passage. Their alien status connotes being in a foreign land with no history, but as also being disconnected from the past via the traditions of slavery where slaves were made to renounce their ties to Africa in service of their slave master.

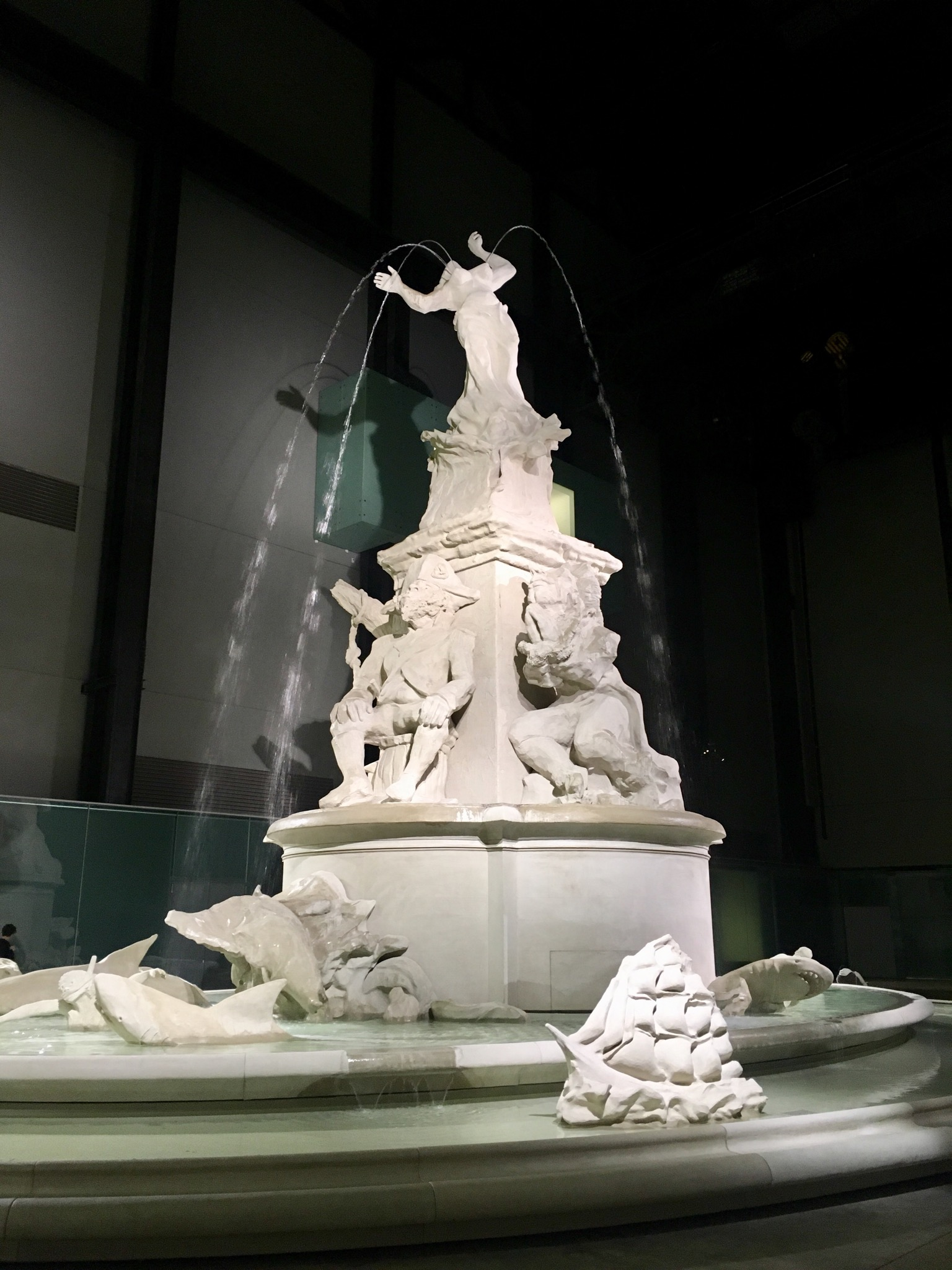
Fons Americanus, Tate Modern, February 2020

Kodwo Eshun locates the first alienation within the context of the Middle Passage. He writes that Afrofuturist texts work to reimagine slavery and alienation by using "extraterritoriality as a hyperbolic trope to explore the historical terms, the everyday implications of forcibly imposed dislocation, and the constitution of Black Atlantic subjectivities". This location of dystopian futures and present realities places science fiction and novels built around dystopian societies directly in the tradition of Black realities.

=== Water ===
In many different Afrofuturist works, water and Black women are symbolically linked in their connection to both the erasure and emergence of Black life. These meanings, while seemingly contradictory, actually play off and inform each other. Examples of Afrofuturist work dealing with the theme of water include the 2009 Kenyan film Pumzi, various songs in Beyonce's Lemonade, the work of Detroit Techno group Drexciya, and Kara Walker's 2019 sculpture Fons Americanus.

=== Reclamation ===
Afrofuturism has to do with reclaiming those identities or perspectives that have been lost. When Mark Dery coined the term, he saw Afrofuturism as giving rise to "a troubling antinomy: Can a community whose past has been deliberately rubbed out, and whose energies have subsequently been consumed by the search for legible traces of its history, imagine possible futures?" Furthermore, Afrofuturism is not restricted to any single medium; there are Afrofuturist novels and musical works. But whatever the medium, Afrofuturism involves reclaiming some type of agency over one's story, a story that has been told, throughout much of history, by official culture in the name of white power. It is for this reason that Dery says, "African-American culture is Afrofuturist at its heart."

=== Queerness ===
In her article “Race and Sexuality in Nalo Hopkinson's Oeuvre; or, Queer Afrofuturism,” Amandine H. Faucheux coins the term "queer Afrofuturism" to describe a certain sub-genre of Afrofuturist works that include themes of queerness, sexuality, and the social and personal meaning of the body. She defines queer Afrofuturism as “an intersectional approach to Afrofuturism that examines the complex and intricate relationships between race and sexuality”. Her article includes an exploration of the history of both Afrofuturism and Black queer theory, as well as an in-depth exploration of some of author Nalo Hopkinson's works as prime examples of existing queer Afrofuturist literature. For Faucheux, the presence of queerness in Afrofuturism “illuminates the functions of racial and sexual metaphors in speculative contexts in general”. An addition to queerness in Afrofuturism, Lil Nas X's music videos are an example of challenging society's expectations of race and sexuality. In "Old Town Road" music video, a futuristic black community is featured alongside the late 19th century west. Racial expectations are challenged through black representation in a genre that is predominantly white. After coming out as gay in 2019, he further expressed his queer identity through his music. He later released a video called "Montero (Call me by you name)" in 2021, where he combines queer expression with the Afrofuturistic aesthetics, and challenges the expectations of both religion and black masculinity. Talbot and Taylor examine the crossover between Afrofuturism and queer futurity and how they create a space for black queer identity and self-expression.

== Difference from Africanfuturism ==
In 2019, Nnedi Okorafor, a Nigerian-American writer of fantasy and science fiction, began strongly rejecting the term "afrofuturism" as a label for her work and coined the terms "Africanfuturism" and "Africanjujuism" to describe her works and works like hers. In October 2019, she published an essay titled "Defining Africanfuturism" that defines both terms in detail. In that essay, she defined Africanfuturism as a sub-category of science fiction that is "directly rooted in African culture, history, mythology and point-of-view and does not privilege or center the West", is centered with optimistic "visions in the future", and is written (and centered on) "people of African descent" while rooted in the African continent. As such, its center is African, often does extend upon the continent of Africa, and includes the Black diaspora, including fantasy that is set in the future, making a narrative "more science fiction than fantasy" and typically has mystical elements. She differentiated this from Afrofuturism, which she said "positioned African American themes and concerns" at the center of its definition. She also described Africanjujuism as a subcategory of fantasy that "acknowledges the seamless blend of true existing African spiritualities and cosmologies with the imaginative."

In August 2020, Hope Wabuke, a writer and assistant professor at the University of Nebraska–Lincoln of English and creative writing, noted that Afrofuturism, coined by Mark Dery, a white critic, in 1993, treats African-American themes and concerns in the "context of twentieth-century technoculture", which was later expanded by Alondra Nelson, arguing that Dery's conception of Blackness began in 1619 and "is marked solely by the ensuing 400 years of violation by whiteness" that he portrayed as "potentially irreparable". Critical of this definition, saying it lacks the qualities of the "Black American diasporic imagination" and ability to conceive of "Blackness outside of the Black American diaspora" or independent from whiteness, Wabuke further explains how Africanfuturism is more specific and rids itself of the "othering of the white gaze and the de facto colonial Western mindset", free from what she calls the "white Western gaze" and saying this is the main difference "between Afrofuturism and Africanfuturism". She adds that, in her view, Africanfuturism has a different outlook and perspective than "mainstream Western and American science fiction and fantasy" and even Afrofuturism which is "married to the white Western gaze". Wabuke goes on to explain Africanfuturist and Africanjujuist themes in Okorafor's Who Fears Death and Zahrah the Windseeker, Akwaeke Emezi's Pet, and Buchi Emecheta's The Rape of Shavi.

In February 2021, Aigner Loren Wilson of Tor.com explained the difficulty of finding books in the subgenre because many institutions "treat Africanfuturism and Afrofuturism like the same thing" even though the distinction between them is plain. She said that Africanfuturism is "centered in and about Africa and their people" while Afrofuturism is a sci-fi subcategory which is about "Black people within the diaspora", often including stories of those outside Africa, including in "colonized Western societies".

Wilson further outlined a list of stories and books from the genre, highlighting Africanfuturism: An Anthology (edited by Wole Talabi), Namwali Serpell's The Old Drift, Nnedi Okorafor's Lagoon, Nicky Drayden's The Prey of Gods, Oghenechovwen Donald Ekpeki's Ife-Iyoku, the Tale of Imadeyunuagbon, and Tochi Onyebuchi's War Girls. Another reviewer called Okorafor's Lagoon, which "recounts the story of the arrival of aliens in Nigeria", as an Africanfuturist work which requires a reader who is "actively engaged in co-creating the alternative future that the novel is constructing", meaning that the reader becomes part of the "creative conversation".

Gary K. Wolfe reviewed Africanfuturism: An Anthology, which was edited by Wole Talabi, in February 2021. He credits Nnedi Okorafor for coining "Africanfuturism", noting it describes "more Africa-centered SF", although saying he is not sure whether her term "Africanjujuism", a parallel term for fantasy, will catch on. While saying that both are useful, he says that he does not like how they have to "do with the root, not the prefix", with "futurism" only describing a bit of science fiction and fantasy. He still calls the book a "solid anthology", saying it challenges the idea of viewing African science fiction as monolithic. Stories in the book include "Egoli" by T. L. Huchu, "Yat Madit" by Dilman Dila, "Behind Our Irises" by Tlotlo Tsamaase, "Fort Kwame" by Derek Lubangakene, "Rainmaker" by Mazi Nwonwu, "Fruit of the Calabash" by Rafeeat Aliyu, "Lekki Lekki" by Mame Bougouma Diene, and "Sunrise" by Nnedi Okorafor.

In 2022, Alan Muller, in Futures Forestalled ... for Now: South African Science Fiction and Futurism, critiqued the application of "Afrofuturism" to African speculative fiction, arguing that the term's roots in African-American cultural contexts limit its relevance to works produced in Africa. He contended that the prefix "Afro-" implies a diasporic identity and risks erasing African cultural specificities. Muller advocated for a more specific and context-sensitive approach, suggesting terms like "South African futurism" or "Zimbabwean futurism" that reflect local histories, cultures, and narratives more precisely.

Financial Times writer David Pilling wrote that Africancentrism "draws on the past, both real and imagined, to depict a liberated version of the future" which is planted in the African, rather than African-American, experience. He also notes criticism of Black Panther from some like Patrick Gathara, who says its depiction of Africa "differs little from the colonial view", and that one of Okorafor's books, Binti, is being "adapted for television by Hulu", arguing that its success is part of a wave of Africanfuturism.

== Mediums ==
=== Fine arts ===
==== Museum and gallery exhibitions ====
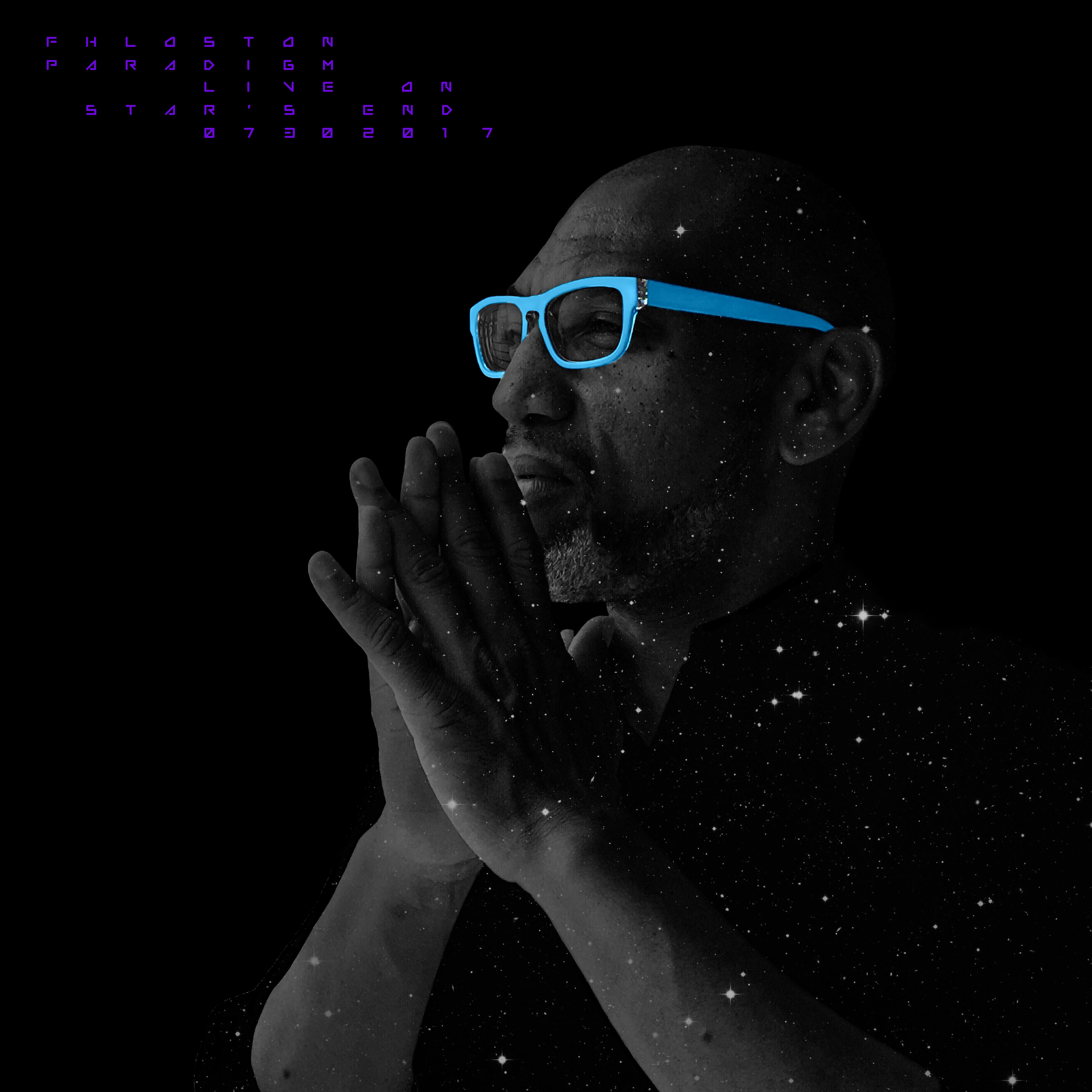
Photo of King Britt from album in November 2017

Naima J. Keith and Zoe Whitley organized The Shadows Took Shape exhibition from November 14, 2013, through March 9, 2014, at the Studio Museum in Harlem. The title originates from a poem by Sun Ra. The show featured 25 years of contemporary Afrofuturist art from 29 artists.

As a part of the MOMA's PS1 festival, King Britt curated Moondance: A Night in the Afro Future in 2014. From noon to six p.m. on 13 April, people could attend Moondance and listen to lectures, live music or watch dance performances in celebration of Afrofuturism in contemporary culture. Schomburg Center for Research in Black Culture held a seminal group show of Visual Afrofuturists focusing on unambiguous science fiction and fantasy based art. The show, titled 'Unveiling Visions: The Alchemy of the Black Imagination' ran from 1 October 2015 – 16 January 2016. The closing night coincided with the Schomburg Black Comic Book Day. Unveiling Visions was curated by artist John Jennings (co-founder of artist duo, Black Kirby w/Professor Stacey Robinson) and Afrofuturist Scholar, Reynaldo Anderson (founder of The Black Speculative Arts Movement). The show featured artists such as Tony Puryear, Sheeba Maya, Mshindo Kuumba, Eric Wilkerson, Manzel Bowman, Grey Williamson, Tim Fielder, Stacey Robinson, and Shawn Alleyne. Unveiling Visions liner notes state: "exhibition includes artifacts from the Schomburg collections that are connected to Afrofuturism, Black speculative imagination and Diasporan cultural production. Offering a fresh perspective on the power of speculative imagination and the struggle for various freedoms of expression in popular culture, Unveiling Visions showcases illustrations and other graphics that highlight those popularly found in science fiction, magical realism and fantasy. Items on display include film posters, comics, T-shirts, magazines, CD covers, playbills, religious literature, and more."

In April 2016, Niama Safia Sandy curated an exhibit entitled "Black Magic: AfroPasts / Afrofutures" at the Corridor Gallery in Brooklyn, New York. The multidisciplinary art exhibit looks at the relationship between magical realism and afrofuturism through the Black diaspora. In a description of the collection, Sandy stated: "There's a lot of looking back and looking forward happening in this work... [and there's a lot of] celebrating those journeys whether they are intentional or forced journeys."

The exhibition Afro-Tech and the Future of Re-Invention ran from 21 October 2017 until 22 April 2018 at Dortmunder U in Dortmund, Germany and looked at "speculative visions of the future and current developments in the field of digital technology by artists and inventors from Africa and the African diaspora...."

These Afrofuturist artists used their art as revolution in that they saw its purpose as inspiring Black people to imagine new possibilities and futures.

"Black Metropolis: 30 Years of Afrofuturism, Comics, Music, Animation, Decapitated Chickens, Heroes, Villains and Negroes" was a one-man show focusing on the career of cartoonist and visual afrofuturist, Tim Fielder. The show, designed to travel over multiple gallery spaces, opened at New York Gallatin Galleries from 23 to 30 May 2016. Curated by Boston Fielder, the exhibit featured both published and unpublished work ranging from independent comics art for alternative magazine, Between C & D and mainstream comics work done for Marvel Comics. Black Metropolis was revived at The Hammonds House Museum in Atlanta, Georgia for the museum's 30th Anniversary, from 12 October–25 November 2018.

Afrofuturism Art coincides with Afrofuturism Literature occasionally, such as in science fiction comic books. Just as Afrofuturism explores possibilities, so do the art in Afrofuturism comic books. For example, Black Panther, the movie and comic book is a form of Afrofuturism Literature.

In 2021, the Metropolitan Museum of Art opened Before Yesterday We Could Fly: An Afrofuturist Period Room, an art exhibition engaging themes of Afrofuturism in a "period room" format of installation, envisioning the past, present, and future home of someone who lived in Seneca Village, a largely African American settlement destroyed to make way for the construction of Central Park in the mid-1800s.

In 2022, the Hayward Gallery organised an exhibition of 11 contemporary artists from the African diaspora, who draw on science fiction, myth and Afrofuturism to question our knowledge of the world, curated by Ekow Eshun. Some of the artists included in the exhibition were Nick Cave, Rashad Newsome, Kara Walker, Hew Locke, Wangechi Mutu, Lina Iris Viktor and Ellen Gallagher.

Starting on March 24, 2023, and lasting a year, the NMAAHC opened an exhibit titled Afrofuturism: A History of Black Futures, located on the Concourse Level in the Bank of America Special Exhibitions Gallery. The exhibit featured a spacecraft-themed entrance; visitors were provided with copies of The Cosmic Companion: Your Guide to the Exhibition, which encouraged readers to imagine themselves as space-time travelers as they walked through the exhibit. The museum also published an accompanying book called with the same name, which contains 21 essays categorized under the sections: Space is the Place, Speculative Worlds, Visualizing Afrofuturism, and Musical Features.

Women of Afrofuturism, the first Afrofuturist art exhibition to feature the leading women in the movement, premiered at the SFO Museum on May 17, 2025, running through November 8, 2026.

=== Episodic videos ===
In 2023, Disney+'s sci-fi animation series Kizazi Moto: Generation Fire revolved around afro-futuristic tales citing diverse culture themes as well as tales from Egypt, South Africa, Kenya, Zimbabwe, Nigeria and Uganda. Spiderman's executive producer Peter Ramsey supported the release of the series and stipulated "I really want people to come away with the idea that Africa really is as much part of pop culture as America or Europe or anywhere else." to CNN.

=== Filmography ===
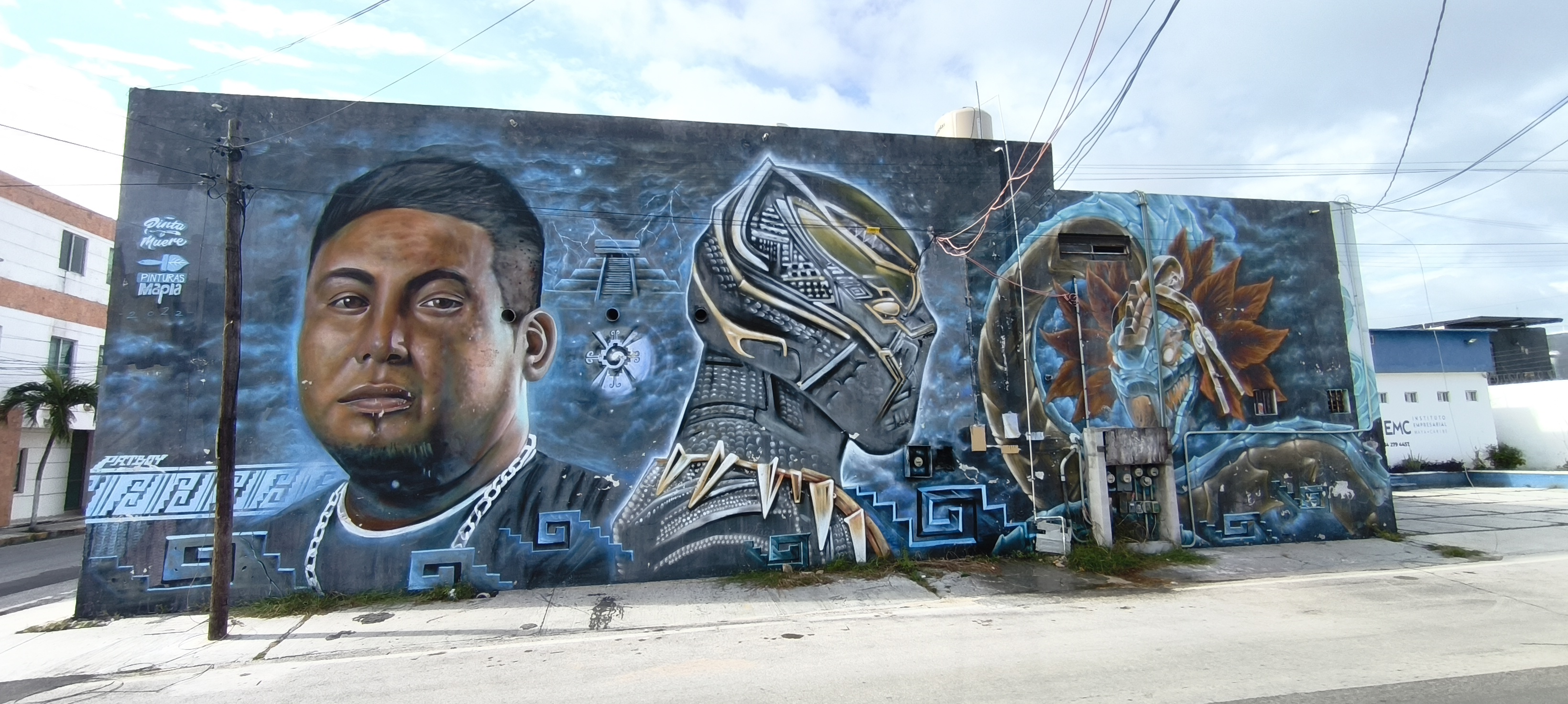
Mural honoring Mayan rapper Pat Boy for his role in Wakanda Forever.

In film, Afrofuturism is the incorporation of Black people's history and culture in science fiction film and related genres. The Guardian's Ashley Clark said the term Afrofuturism has "an amorphous nature" but that Afrofuturist films are "united by one key theme: the centring of the international Black experience in alternate and imagined realities, whether fiction or documentary; past or present; science fiction or straight drama". The New York Times's Glenn Kenny said, "Afrofuturism is more prominent in music and the graphic arts than it is in cinema, but there are movies out there that illuminate the notion in different ways."

With the release of Marvel's Black Panther in 2018, Afrofuturism was ushered into the cultural spotlight across the world cinematic stage. In North America alone, it made history as the third highest-grossing film in history, reviving mainstream interest in Afrofuturism. It defied stereotypes of Africa as disease- and war-stricken and fueled feelings of Black pride in viewers.

=== Literature and comics ===
The creation of the term Afrofuturism, in the 1990s, was often primarily used to categorize "speculative fiction that treats African-American themes and addresses African-American concerns in the context of 20th-century technoculture," but was soon expanded to include artistic, scientific, and spiritual practices throughout the African diaspora. Contemporary practice retroactively identifies and documents historical instances of Afrofuturist practice and integrates them into the canon. For example, the Dark Matter anthologies edited by Sheree Thomas feature contemporary Black science fiction, discuss Ralph Ellison's Invisible Man in her introduction, "Looking for the Invisible", and also include older works by W. E. B. Du Bois, Charles W. Chesnutt, and George S. Schuyler.

Lisa Yazsek argues that Ralph Ellison's 1952 novel, Invisible Man, should be thought of as a predecessor to Afrofuturist literature. Yaszek believes that Ellison does not offer any other futures so that the next generation of authors can.

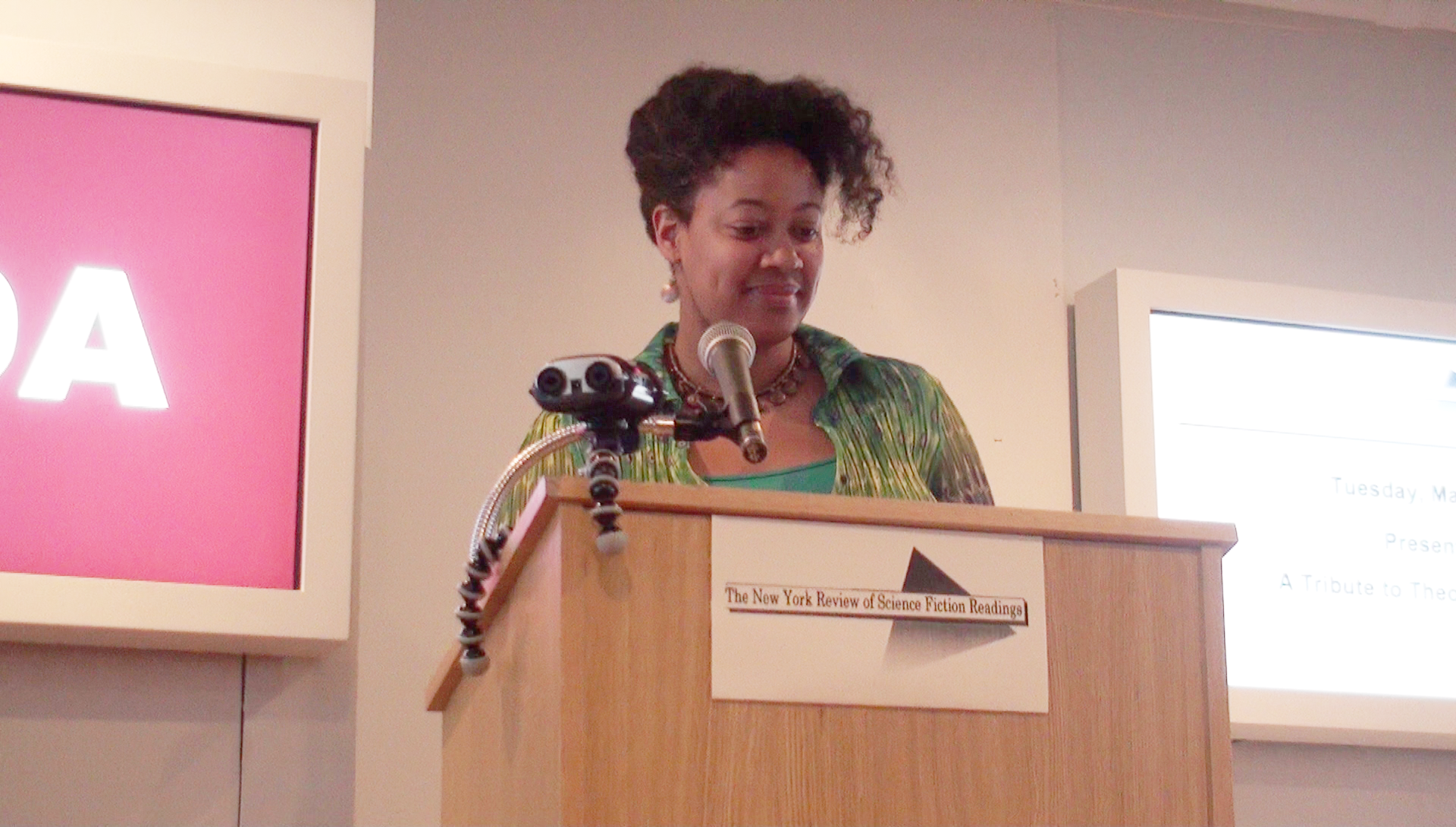
N. K. Jemisin speaking before a meeting of the New York Review of Science Fiction Readings in May 2011

A number of contemporary science fiction and speculative fiction authors have also been characterized as Afrofuturist or as employing Afrofuturist themes by one person or another. Nancy Farmer won a Newbery Honor for her afrofuturist young adult novel The Ear, the Eye, and the Arm. Steven Barnes has been called an Afrofuturist author for his alternate-history novels Lion's Blood and Zulu Heart. N.K. Jemisin, Nalo Hopkinson, and Colson Whitehead have also been referred to as Afrofuturist authors. Butler inspired a movement with vision amongst the Black speculative fiction writers. Octavia Butler's science fiction writings are associated with Afrofuturism. Her storytelling subverts fixed binaries that emerge from systemic oppression, such as how her multi-ethnic and multi-species communities invite collaboration rather than hierarchy. In Samuel R. Delany's "The Mirror of Afrofuturism," in which he claims Afrofuturism as a genre does not exist, he explains how Butler, specifically her 2003 short story "Amnesty", contains "something more powerful than any local notion of what creates racial distinctions."Portland State University Single Sign-On - Stale Request However, the fourth book of the science fiction Patternist series, Wild Seed, particularly fits ideas of Afrofuturist thematic concerns, as the narrative of two immortal Africans Doro and Anyanwu features science fiction technologies and an alternate anti-colonialist history of seventeenth century America. At the most straightforward sci-fi stories (likewise alluded to in this book as Sci-Fi and SF) is a social classification worried about parts of futurism, envisioned advances as well as between planetarism. Those focuses or direction take into consideration a wide scope of enunciations and theories regarding the dystopian or utopian parts of future (or potentially elective) lives or real factors, including, in numerous examples, contact with outsider others. In other words, good fiction writing should not be judged by a person's color or race.

Outside of the United States and North America, the African diaspora has developed specific Afrofuturism thematic in different territories. In the (French) Caribbean for example, authors like Michael Roch have developed a whole universe based on cultural and geographical specificities but still linked to the Afrofuturism thematics. In Quebec, writer Léa Murat-Ingles published Les rythmes de la poussière in 2024, thereby expanding the scope of Francophone Afrofuturism.

Tim Fielder's 2021 graphic novel Infinitum: An Afrofuturist Tale features the partially historical narrative of an immortal African king.

In February 2021, The New York Times reported that in the coming year, fans would see a number of graphic novels and comics with Afrofuturist themes, including some devoted to the fictional gene, and "reissues of Afrofuturist titles from comic-book houses like DC and Dark Horse." This includes the new novels After the Rain, Hardears, Black Star, and Infinitum, the latter by Tim Fielder, a new installment of N.K. Jemisin's Far Sector, The Black Panther by Ta-Nehisi Coates and many other re-issued comics like E.X.O., along with an upcoming animated series named Iwájú. Around the same time, Kenyan artist Kevo Abbra, inspired by Afrofuturism in the 1990s, was interviewed, explaining how artistic expression has developed over time and his current artistic style. The first issue of the new Black Panther series was released on 16 February.

== See also ==
- Black Abstractionism – Modern arts movement
- Black science fiction – Science fiction involving black people
- Chicanafuturism – Artistic genre
- Cyberpunk – Science fiction subgenre in a futuristic dystopian setting
- Indigenous Futurisms – Indigenous literary and artistic movement
- Latinofuturism – Latino speculative fiction movement
- List of Afrofuturist literature
- Speculative fiction by writers of color – Speculative fiction created by nonwhite authors
- Vibranium – Fictional metal appearing in Marvel Comics
