= Russell Elevado =

American audio engineer (born 1966)

- Born: 1966 (age 59–60); Philippines
- Occupations: recording engineer, record producer

Russell Elevado (born 1966) is a recording engineer and record producer based in New York City.

== Biography ==
Elevado was born in the Philippines in 1966. His family immigrated to the United States in 1972, and he grew up in New York City, where he studied at the Institute of Audio Research. Elevado's career started in 1986 when he started an internship at producer Arthur Baker's Shakedown Studios in New York City. Elevado worked at various studios as assistant engineer, eventually ending up at Quad Studios, where he worked as a staff engineer from 1989 to 1991. Upon leaving Quad Studios, Elevado went independent.

== Accolades ==
Elevado earned a Grammy Award in 2000 for his production work recording and mixing contemporary R&B recording artist D'Angelo's critically acclaimed album Voodoo. Voodoo is now considered a classic album in the contemporary R&B genre and paved the way for the neo soul movement. Elevado's "old school" engineering and production techniques and preference for using mostly vintage equipment gave the album a sound reminiscent of classic soul or funk records fused with hip-hop textures and psychedelic treatments heard on classic 1960s and 1970s rock records.

In 2009, he received a Grammy nomination for Best Engineered Album for engineering Al Green's Lay It Down.

In 2015, he won a Grammy for Best R&B Album on D'Angelo's Black Messiah, the long-awaited follow-up to Voodoo.

In 2020 Elevado won a Grammy in the Best World Music category for mixing Angelique Kidjo's "Celia" album. in the same year he also received a nomination as producer/engineer/mixer for the band Lettuce in the Best Jazz instrumental album category.

Elevado's shows his broad range of styles among artists when he received the Grammy award for Album of the year for Jon Batiste's album We Are in 2022, which also won numerous awards that year.

From 2003 to 2006 Elevado produced, recorded and mixed 3 albums for the late jazz trumpet player Roy Hargrove. The band was called Roy Hargrove and the RH Factor which was a fusion of jazz, soul and funk. All of which were recorded and mixed all analog with minimal overdubs in a time when Elevado's contemporaries were embracing digital recording and mixing. These albums are a prime example of Elevado's sound, creativity and vision.

Elevado mixed a few songs for Bilal's controversially unreleased second album, Love for Sale.

His work with Questlove, the Roots and Common is also notable, pushing the limits of organic hip hop with creative mixing and production. He's worked with influential artists and producers of his era like Alicia Keys (Elevado mixed her hugely successful debut single “Fallin'”), Jay Z, Rick Rubin, Tony Visconti, Mark Ronson, Erykah Badu and J Dilla to name a few. His commitment to analog and organic method of creativity sets him apart. In previous interviews, Elevado states his dissatisfaction with the digital recording medium and the way it has changed the industry and the creative process of artists and production. Elevado does not use any plug-ins (digital effects and processing) and uses analog equipment exclusively for processing. His dedication to analog has defined his career attracting a wide range of artists from different genres.

== Selected discography ==
Full albums

- Al Green - Lay It Down (engineered full album)
- Angélique Kidjo - ÕŸÖ
- Animal Collective - Isn't It Now?
- Blackalicious - Blazing Arrow
- Blackalicious - The Craft
- Corneille - The Birth of Cornelius
- D'Angelo - Brown Sugar (mixed 3 tracks)
- D'Angelo - Voodoo (engineered and mixed)
- D'Angelo - Black Messiah
- Dave Chappelle’s Block Party - Soundtrack w/ various artists
- Dornik- Dornik
- Goapele - Change It All
- iET - So Unreal
- Jay-Z Feat. The Roots - MTV Unplugged
- Kamasi Washington - Truth
- Karl Denson - The Bridge
- Keziah Jones - Black Orpheus
- Keziah Jones - Captain Rugged
- Mike Andersen - Echoes
- Nikka Costa - Everybody's Got Their Something
- Nikka Costa - Pebble to a Pearl
- Patrice - Nile
- Patrice - One
- The Roots - Game Theory (mixed selected tracks)
- Roy Hargrove presents The RH Factor - Hard Groove (Co-produced, engineered and mixed)
- Roy Hargrove presents The RH Factor - Strength EP (Co-produced, engineered and mixed)
- Roy Hargrove presents The RH Factor - Distractions (Co-produced, engineered and mixed)
- Saul Williams - Amethyst Rock Star
- The Dandy Warhols - The Dandy Warhols Are Sound
- Tye Tribbett & G.A - Life
- Wayna - The Expats
- Zap Mama - ReCreation
