= Peter Taub =

- Born: 1958 (age 67–68)
- Occupations: Independent Curator and former Director of Performance Programs, Museum of Contemporary Art, Chicago

Peter Taub (born 1958) was the director of performance programs at the Museum of Contemporary Art, Chicago and is now an independent freelance curator. Taub served as the head of the MCA’s performing arts program since its conception in 1996 until his departure in 2016.

== Education and career ==
Prior to joining the MCA staff, Taub was the executive director of the Randolph Street Gallery. Taub has more than 20 years experience in developing visual and performance art exhibitions and community outreach programs.

Taub earned a BA from Princeton in cultural history and photography and later went on to receive an MFA in photography and sculpture from the School of the Art Institute of Chicago. He has participated in policy committees and boards for various Chicago-based cultural organizations.

Taub says that when curating shows for the MCA, he does not look for linear narratives: "I think that the episodic, fractured narrative really is closer to our multitasking world....I try to have work on our stage that is similarly multifaceted."

== MCA Stage ==
The MCA Stage—the museum’s performing arts program founded in 1996—features performers ranging from Chicago-based artists such as eighth blackbird and Hubbard Street Dance Chicago to artists from the Congo, Poland, Mexico, Ireland, and beyond. Under Taub’s leadership, the MCA Stage developed an ensemble-in-residence program as well as the MCA Composers Stage series, which is devoted to supporting the new and experimental music scene, and the MCA Global Stage series, which features international theater companies.

Taub has commissioned new works for the MCA by artists including Meg Stuart/Damaged Goods, The Builders Association, William Kentridge/Handspring Puppet Company, and Ernest Khabeer Dawkins, among others. In 2007, the MCA commissioned cello and video work by Maya Beiser, and it commissioned a work by Reggie Wilson/Fist and Heel Performance Group. MCA Stage 2011 commissions include Lucky Plush Productions The Better Half and Curious Theatre Branch Still in Play: A Performance of Getting Ready.

=== Key performances ===
Time is Not Even, Space is Not Empty by the Japanese-American dance artists Eiko & Koma is the first exhibition and performance project Taub curated for the MCA. The 2011 exhibition consists of three performances—Naked, The Caravan Project, and Regeneration—and a gallery component.

The MCA Stage has hosted notable dance performers, such as the Trisha Brown Dance Company, most recently in 2011, celebrating the company’s 40th year, Bill T. Jones (2008), and Merce Cunningham (2007); Taub is noted as key player in Chicago’s growth as a dance city.

In 2008, the MCA Stage hosted the Chicago-debut of New York-based Elevator Repair Service and its performance of Gatz, a seven-hour reading and reenactment of F. Scott Fitzgerald's The Great Gatsby. A Chicago critic writes, "Those lucky enough to catch Gatz were treated to a perspective-altering experience. When the show finally hit New York in 2010, it was the talk of the town, but Chicagoans had already beentheredonethat, thanks to the MCA."
