= MCA Stage =

The MCA Stage is the Museum of Contemporary Art, Chicago’s performing arts program. Founded in 1996 with the opening of the MCA’s new building in Chicago, Illinois.

== History ==
In 1996, Peter Taub was appointed as the MCA director of Performance Programs. Before joinging the MCA, Taub was the executive director of the Randolph Street Gallery. His first year of programming included Latin-jazz trumpeter Jerry Gonzalez, experimental reedist Douglas Ewart, and local free-improv artist Liof Munimula.

Throughout its 15-years, the MCA stage has featured global wide theater, dance, music, multimedia, and film performances. In addition to working with local community organizations for the co-presentations of performing arts, the MCA stage is also known as the "most active interdisciplinary arts presenter in Chicago". The performance program developed "Artists Up Close", which is a series of post-show talks, panels, discussions, and artist-led workshops designed to engage the audience with the artists. The 2009 season saw 80 performances' featuring dance, music, theater, and cross-disciplinary forms, as well as 40 Artists Up Close discussions or workshops.

== Productions ==
In 2011, the Japanese American dance artists Eiko & Koma performed Time is Not Even, Space is Not Empty as the first combination exhibition and performance project Taub curated for the MCA. The exhibition consists of three performances: Naked, The Caravan Project, and Regeneration; as well as a gallery presentation.

In September 2010, the MCA and Chicago-based Redmoon Theater co-produced the project The Astronaut’s Birthday, a multimedia public art spectacle inspired by science fiction and comic books that was projected onto the MCA façade as audience members watched from the MCA plaza. The production used new technologies, live performers, and hand-illustrated shadow imagery to display the 80-foot tall production.

New York-based theater company Elevator Repair Service performed Gatz at the MCA in the company's Chicago debut. The performance—a verbatim retelling of the unabridged version of F. Scott Fitzgerald’s The Great Gatsby—took six hours as performers reenacted the story.

=== Additional Performances ===
- Abbey Theatre of Ireland (2011)
- Trisha Brown Dance Company (2011)
- Cie Heddy Maalem (2011)
- Olafur Arnalds (2011)
- John Jasperse Company (2011, 2005, 2003)
- Young Jean Lee’s Theater Company (2010)
- Akram Khan Company (2010)
- Philip Glass (2009)
- Anna Halprin/Anne Collod & guests (2009)
- Compagnie Marie Chouinard (2009)
- Lucinda Childs (2009)
- Bill T. Jones (2008)
- Laurie Anderson (2008)
- Mike Daisey (2008)
- Complaints Choir (2007)
- Diamanda Galas (2007, 2012)
- Martha Graham (2007)
- Merce Cunningham (2007)
- Chunky Move (2007)
- Reggie Wilson/Fist and Heel Performance Group (2007)
- Paul Taylor Dance Company (2007)
- Liz Lerman Dance Exchange (2006)
- Mark Morris Dance Group (2006)
- Kiki & Herb (2005)
- Emio Greco PC (2005)
- DJ Spooky (2004)
- Societas Raffaello Sanzio (2002)
- dumb type (2002)
- Roger Guenveur Smith (2002)
