= Jocelyn Pook =

Composer and pianist

- Born: 14 February 1960 (age 66); Birmingham, England
- Occupations: Composer, viola player

Jocelyn Pook (/ˈdʒɒslɪn ˈpʊk/, rhyming with "book") (born 14 February 1960) is an English composer who is known for her scores for many films, including Eyes Wide Shut, The Merchant of Venice and The Wife. In addition to her film work, Pook has released three studio albums. The album Deluge led Stanley Kubrick to notice her work and facilitated her entry into film scoring. Her principal instrument is the viola. Her scores and performances have received multiple awards from organisations such as the British Academy of Film and Television Arts and the American Society of Composers, Authors and Publishers.

== Education ==
Pook graduated in 1983 from London's Guildhall School of Music and Drama, where she studied the viola with David Takeno and piano with Carola Grindea. One of Pook`s first performance jobs was playing the violin in the musical composition for the Internationalist Theatre production of Miss Julie.

== Career ==
Pook took part in the band ABC's Lexicon Of Love World Tour and appeared in the Julien Temple/ABC movie Mantrap, continuing with a period of recording and performing with artists including Massive Attack, PJ Harvey, Peter Gabriel and as a member of The Communards for their three-year life. She also performed in this period as musician/actor with experimental theatre companies Impact Theatre Co-operative and Lumiere & Son, as well as in several productions with The National Theatre.

As a composer her early works were mainly for dance and she wrote scores for DV8 Physical Theatre, O Vertigo Danse, Wayne MacGregor, Phoenix Dance Company, Shobana Jeyasingh Dance and more recently Akram Khan Company and English National Ballet. She worked on several DV8 Physical Theatre, shows including Strange Fish, which won a Prix Italia Award for Music.

Pook was a member of composer Jeremy Peyton Jones's post systems music ensemble Regular Music, and recorded their albums for Rough Trade and Century XXI. She co-founded neoclassical chamber quartet Electra Strings alongside Australian violinist Sonia Slany. The Electra Quartet recorded, arranged and performed with many artists including Jools Holland, Mark Knopfler, The Stranglers, The Cranberries, This Mortal Coil, Nick Cave, Divine Comedy, Paul Weller, Ryuichi Sakamoto, Michael Nyman and Laurie Anderson, and in 1991 appeared in Derek Jarman's film Edward II.

As a solo recording artist, Pook released several albums, including Deluge (Virgin Records 1997), Flood (Virgin Records 1999) and Untold Things (RealWorld Records 2001 – 2013). These also featured several singers she works regularly with, notably Melanie Pappenheim with whom she has collaborated on many projects.

Her career as a film composer took off when Stanley Kubrick heard her album Deluge and asked her to score his film Eyes Wide Shut. The piece "Masked Ball", which incorporated a fragment of an Orthodox Liturgy played backward and lyrics sung (or chanted) in Romanian, underscored the masked ball sequence. Pook's score for Eyes Wide Shut received a Chicago Film Award and a Golden Globe nomination.

Pook's score to Michael Radford's film The Merchant of Venice with Al Pacino featured countertenor Andreas Scholl and was nominated for a Classical Brit Award. Other notable film scores include Brick Lane (Dir: Sarah Gavron), Heidi (Dir: Paul Marcus), Time Out (L’Emploi Du Temps, Dir: Laurent Cantet), Julio Medem's Caótica Ana and Room in Rome, and a piece for the soundtrack to Gangs of New York directed by Martin Scorsese.

In 2018, she composed the soundtrack for The Wife starring Glenn Close, Jonathan Pryce and Christian Slater, which won the 2019 Music & Sound Award for Best Original Composition in a Feature Film.

Pook was nominated for a BAFTA for her score for Channel 4's The Government Inspector and, in April 2018, she won a BAFTA for her music for the 2017 TV film version of King Charles III (Dir: Rupert Gould). She wrote the score for Netflix documentary series The Staircase directed by Jean-Xavier Lestrade.

Pook wrote several concert, music theatre and opera pieces as well as touring with "The Jocelyn Pook Ensemble".

In 2002, she was commissioned by The Proms to write a piece for The King's Singers, "Mobile", in collaboration with Andrew Motion. In 2003, she won a British Composer Award (currently named the Ivors Composer Awards) for her music-theatre piece "Speaking in Tunes". She was commissioned to write a short opera, Ingerland, for ROH2 (the contemporary producing arm of London's Royal Opera House) which was performed in the Royal Opera House's Linbury Studio Theatre in June 2010. In December 2012, her symphonic song cycle "Hearing Voices", exploring experiences of mental illness, featuring Melanie Pappenheim with Charles Hazlewood conducting the BBC Concert Orchestra was premiered at the Queen Elizabeth Hall.

Pook won a second British Composer Award in 2012 for her soundtrack to Akram Khan's dance production DESH. In June 2014, she composed music for English National Ballet's Glastonbury Festival debut on the Pyramid Stage, performing Akram Khan's First World War-themed Dust, broadcast on BBC2. Her most recent ballet for English National Ballet, M-Dao choreographed by Yabin Wang, premiered in 2016 at Sadler's Wells.

She won an Olivier Award in 2008 for the National Theatre's production of St Joan (Dir: Marianne Elliot). Other theatre work includes the 2014 play King Charles III by Mike Bartlett which premiered at Almeida Theatre, transferred to West End's Wyndham's Theatre and then to Broadway, New York. Pook wrote the score for National Theatre of Scotland's award-winning Adam, which premiered at Edinburgh International Festival in 2017 and featured a 120-strong, international digitally connected trans choir.

In 2019, Pook was commissioned by The Proms to write a new piece for Prom 49: The Lost Words. "You Need To Listen To Us" sets words from speeches by environmental activist Greta Thunberg to music. She also composed the soundtrack for The Kingmaker, a documentary about the controversial political career of Imelda Marcos, the former first lady of the Philippines, directed by Lauren Greenfield.

== Politics ==
In November 2019, along with other public figures, Pook signed a letter supporting Labour Party leader Jeremy Corbyn, describing him as "a beacon of hope in the struggle against emergent far-right nationalism, xenophobia and racism in much of the democratic world" and endorsed him in the 2019 UK general election.

== Awards and honours ==
- Music and Sound Award (Best Original Composition, 2019) for The Wife
- Bafta (Original Music, 2018) for King Charles III
- Special Mention of the Jury, Karlovy Vary Film Festival (Best Music, 2011) for Room 304
- Olivier Award (Best Music and Sound Design, 2008) for St Joan
- ASCAP Award for Brick Lane
- British Composer Award (Multi-Media, 2003) for Speaking in Tunes
- ASCAP Award for Eyes Wide Shut

== Discography ==
=== Studio albums ===
- 1997 – Deluge
- 1999 – Flood
- 2001 – Untold Things

=== Singles ===
- 1997 – "Blow The Wind" – Virgin Records
- 2003 – "Sacrum" (12 – inch) – Additive

=== Albums with ensembles ===
- 1997 – Meeting Electra – Electra Strings & Paul Clarvis (with Sonia Slany) – Village Life 97121 VL

== Live theatre and dance ==
- 2018 – Memorial – For Chris Drummond, the director of 'Memorial'
- 2017 – Adam – For National Theatre of Scotland
- 2016 – Macbeth – For Shakespeare's Globe Theatre
- 2014 – King Charles III – For Almeida Theatre
- 2014 – Dust – For the dancework of the English National Ballet (choreographed by Akram Khan)
- 2013 – Itmoi – For the dancework of the group Akram Khan
- 2013 – Bench – For MODERNE MEISJES
- 2011 – Desh – For the dancework of the group Akram Khan
- 2006 – King John – For the Royal Shakespeare Company

== Soundtracks (film and TV) ==
- 1994–96 – Blight – 14-minute short film by John Smith
- 1999 – Eyes Wide Shut – directed by Stanley Kubrick
- 1999 – Nasty Neighbours – directed by Debbie Isitt
- 2000 – My Khmer Heart (Breaking Hearts)
- 2000 – The Sight – directed by Paul Anderson
- 2000 – Enron advert, "Ode to Why Campaign"
- 2000 – Comment j'ai tué mon père (How I Killed My Father)
- 2001 – In a Land of Plenty – 10 episode BBC drama series produced by Sterling Pictures and Talkback
- 2001 – Stanley Kubrick: A Life in Pictures – documentary, director Jan Harlan
- 2001 – L'Emploi Du Temps (Time Out)
- 2002 – Addicted to the Stars
- 2002 – The Repentant (La Repentie)
- 2002 – La Guerre à Paris (The War in Paris)
- 2002 – Gangs of New York – directed by Martin Scorsese
- 2004 – The Merchant of Venice
- 2004 – Wild Side
- 2004 – Soupçons (The Staircase)
- 2004 – They Came Back
- 2005 – The Government Inspector
- 2005–2006 – Heidi
- 2007 – Brick Lane
- 2007 – Remnants of Everest: The 1996 Tragedy (US: Storm over Everest)
- 2009 – The People v. Leo Frank
- 2009 – Chaotic Ana
- 2009 – Going South
- 2010 – Room in Rome
- 2011 – Room 304
- 2012 – Augustine
- 2012 – Les Invisibles
- 2017 – King Charles III
- 2017 – The Wife
- 2019 – The Kingmaker
- 2023 – Tin&Tina

== Various collaborations ==
- 1993 – Plus from US – various artists – Real World Records
- 1993 – Way Down Buffalo Hell – Jam Nation – ("Sleeping, She Moved Through The Fair") – Real World Records
- 1996 – A Night in London – Mark Knopfler – Mercury Records
- 1997 – Friday the Thirteenth – The Stranglers – ("Waltz in Black", "Valley of the Birds", "Daddy's Riding the Range", "Golden Brown", "No More Heroes")
- 1999 – Liquid Sunshine – Keziah Jones – ("Hello Heavenly", "Runaway", "Teardrops Will Fall") – Delabel
- 2000 – OVO (The soundtrack for the Millennium Dome Show of Cirque du Soleil) – Peter Gabriel – ("Low Light", "The Time of the Turning", "The Weaver's Reel", "Downside Up", "The Nest that Sailed the Sky") – Real World Records
- 2003 – Something Dangerous – Natacha Atlas – ("Adam's Lullaby") – Mantra Records
- 2008 – Ana Hina – Natacha Atlas – World Village
