= Museum of Contemporary Art Chicago =

Museum in Illinois, US

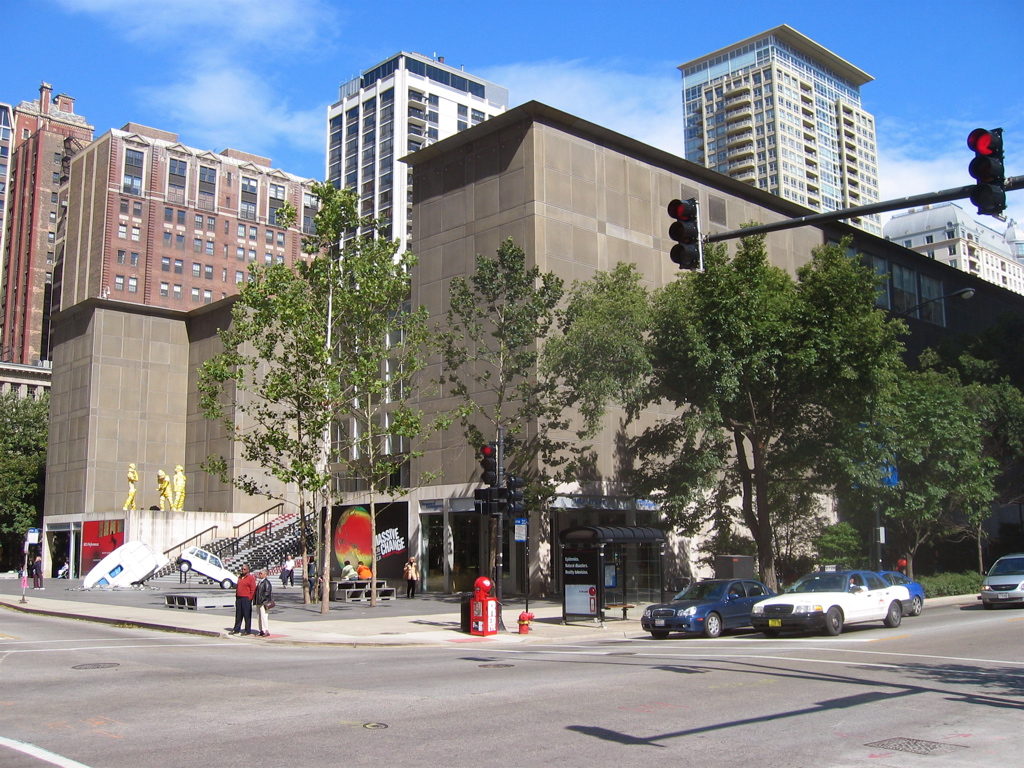

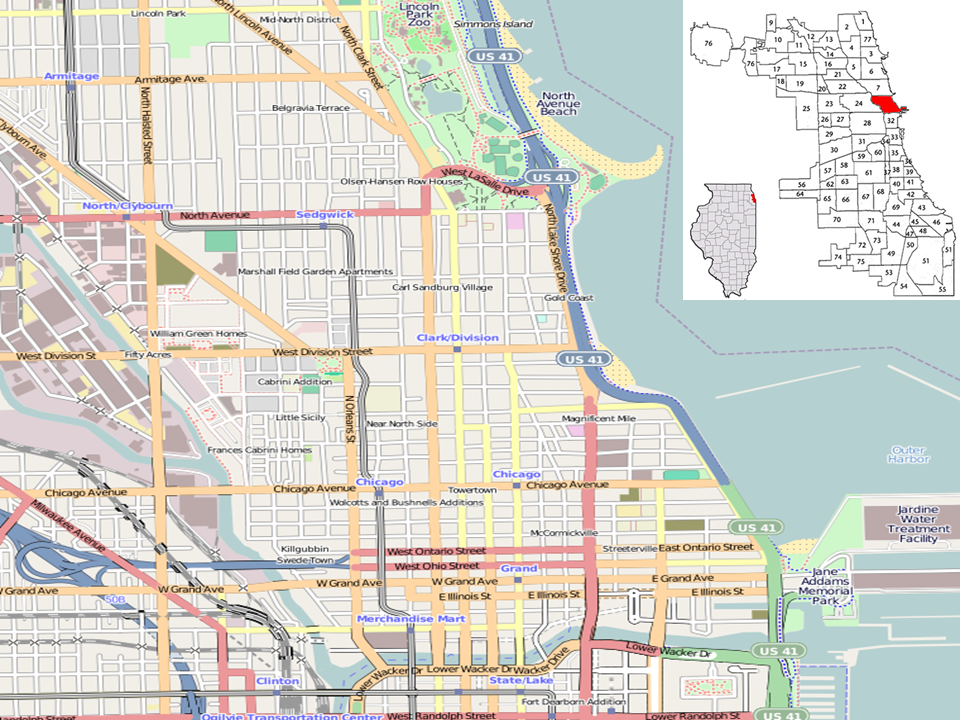
- Location in Chicago's Near North Side
- Established: 1967 (current location since 1996)
- Location: 220 East Chicago Avenue, Chicago, Illinois 60611-2643; United States
- Coordinates: 41.8972°N 87.6212°W
- Director: Madeleine Grynsztejn
- Website: mcachicago.org

The Museum of Contemporary Art Chicago (MCA) is a contemporary art museum near Water Tower Place in the Near North Side community area of Chicago, Illinois, United States. The museum, which was established in 1967, is one of the world's largest contemporary art venues. The museum's collection is composed of thousands of objects of Post-World War II visual art. The museum is run gallery-style, with individually curated exhibitions throughout the year. Each exhibition may be composed of temporary loans, pieces from their permanent collection, or a combination of the two.

The museum has hosted several notable debut exhibitions, including Frida Kahlo's first U.S. exhibition and Jeff Koons' first solo museum exhibition. Koons later presented an exhibit at the museum that broke the museum's attendance record. The current record for the most attended exhibition is the 2017 exhibition of Takashi Murakami's work. The museum's collection, which includes Jasper Johns, Andy Warhol, Cindy Sherman, Kara Walker, and Alexander Calder, contains historical samples of 1940s–1970s late surrealism, pop art, minimalism, and conceptual art; notable holdings also include 1980s postmodernism, as well as contemporary painting, sculpture, photography, video, installation, and related media. It also presents dance, theater, music, and multidisciplinary arts.

The current location at 220 East Chicago Avenue is in the Streeterville neighborhood of the Near North Side community area. Josef Paul Kleihues designed the current building after the museum conducted a 12-month search, reviewing more than 200 nominations. The museum was initially located at 237 East Ontario Street, which was originally designed as a bakery. The current building is known for its signature staircase leading to an elevated ground floor, which has an atrium, the full glass-walled east and west façades giving a direct view of the city and Lake Michigan.

== History ==
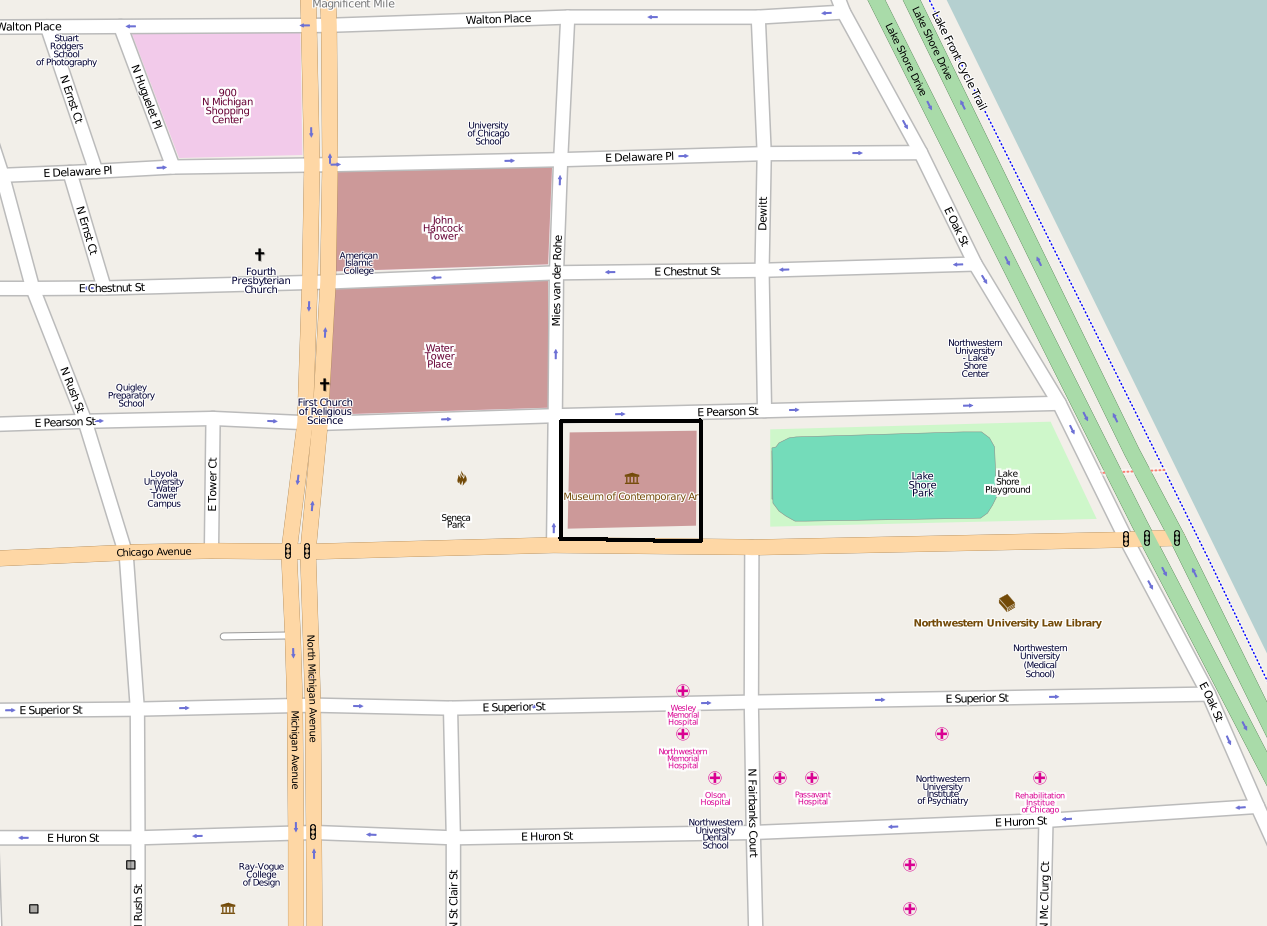
Map of MCA (southeast of Water Tower Place and the John Hancock Center) along Chicago Avenue

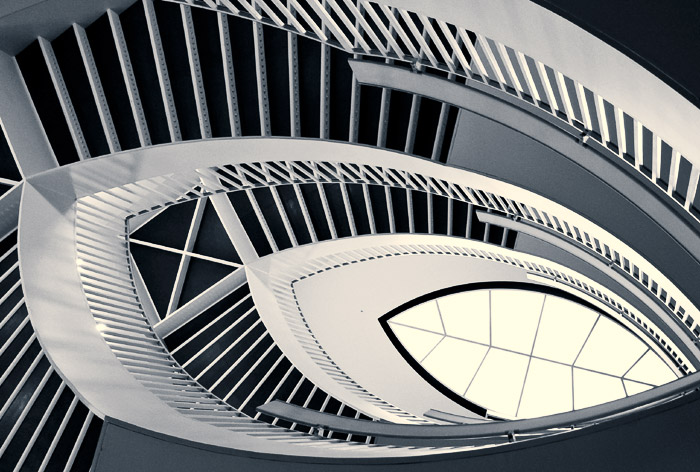
Stairwell in the museum building, designed by Josef Paul Kleihues

The Museum of Contemporary Art Chicago (MCA) was created as the result of a 1964 meeting of 30 critics, collectors and dealers at the home of critic Doris Lane Butler to bring the long-discussed idea of a museum of contemporary art to complement the city's Art Institute of Chicago, according to a grand opening story in Time. It opened in fall 1967 in a small space at 237 East Ontario Street that had for a time served as the corporate offices of Playboy Enterprises. Its first director was Jan van der Marck. In 1970, he invited Wolf Vostell to make the Concrete Traffic sculpture in Chicago.

Initially, the museum was conceived primarily as a space for temporary exhibitions, in the German kunsthalle model. However, in 1974, the museum began acquiring a permanent collection of contemporary art objects created after 1945. The MCA expanded into adjacent buildings to increase gallery space; and in 1977, following a fundraising drive for its 10th anniversary, a three-story neighboring townhouse was purchased, renovated, and connected to the museum. In 1978, Gordon Matta-Clark executed his final major project in the townhouse. In his work Circus Or The Caribbean Orange (1978), Matta-Clark made circle cuts in the walls and floors of the townhouse next-door to the first museum.

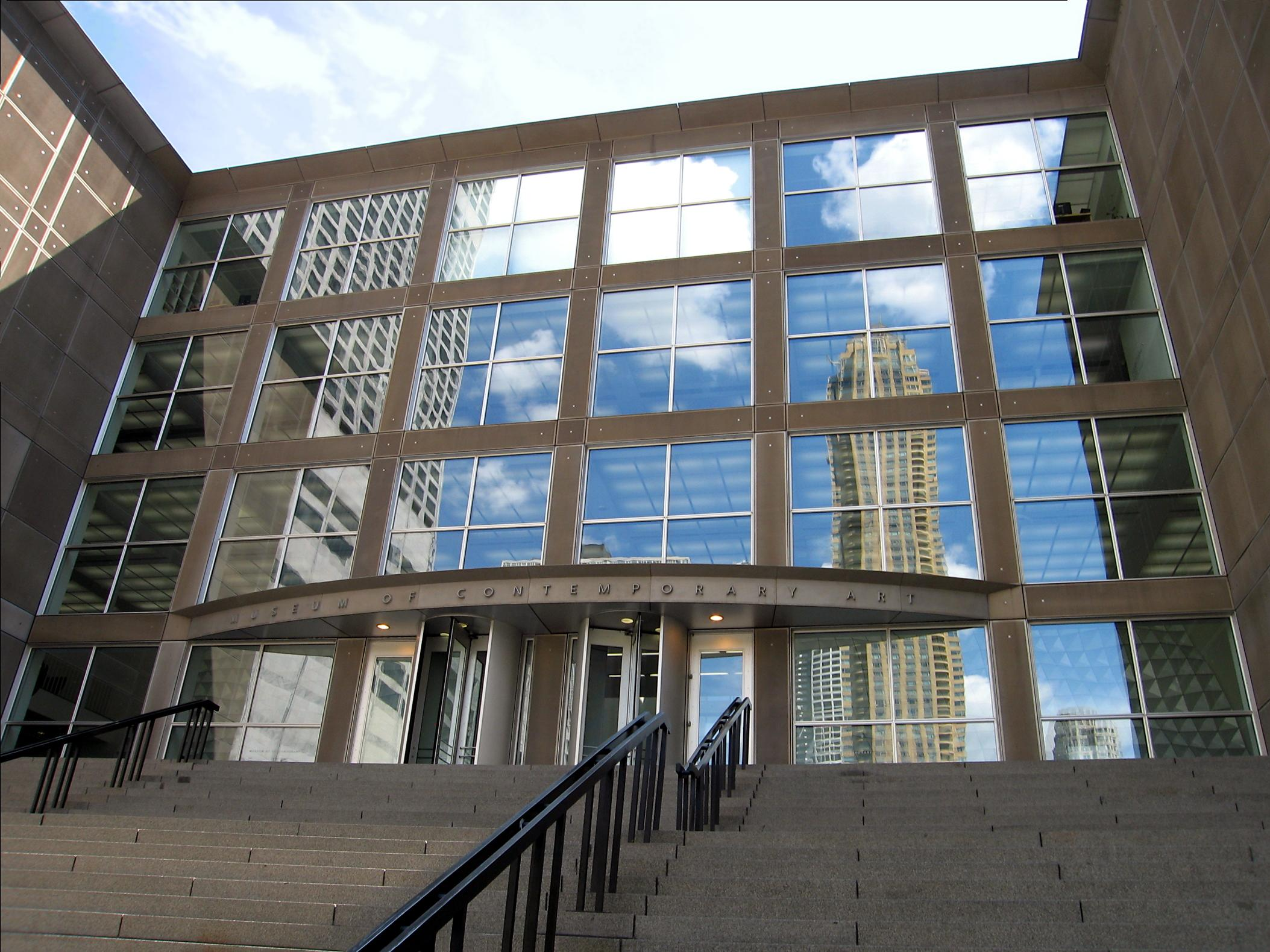
Museum of Contemporary Art, Chicago

In 1991, the museum's Board of Trustees contributed $37 million ($87.5 million today) of the expected $55 million ($130 million) construction costs for Chicago's first new museum building in 65 years. Six of the board members were central to the fundraising as major donors: Jerome Stone (chairman emeritus of Stone Container Corporation), Beatrice C. Mayer (daughter of Sara Lee Corporation founder Nathan Cummings) and family, Mrs. Edwin Lindy Bergman, the Neison Harris (president of Pittway Corporation) and Irving Harris families, and Thomas and Frances Dittmer (commodities). The Board of Trustees then weighed architectural proposals from six finalists: Emilio Ambasz of New York; Tadao Ando of Osaka, Japan; Josef Paul Kleihues of Berlin; Fumihiko Maki of Tokyo; Morphosis of Santa Monica, Calif.; and Christian de Portzamparc of Paris. According to Chicago Tribune Pulitzer Prize-winning architecture critic Blair Kamin, the list of contenders was controversial because no Chicago-based architects were included as finalists despite the fact that prominent Chicago architects such as Helmut Jahn and Stanley Tigerman were among the 23 semi-finalists. In fact, none of the finalists had made any prior structures in Chicago. The selection process, which started with 209 contenders, was based on professional qualifications, recent projects, and the ability to work closely with the staff of the aspiring museum.

1st Cavalry Illinois National Guard new armory building

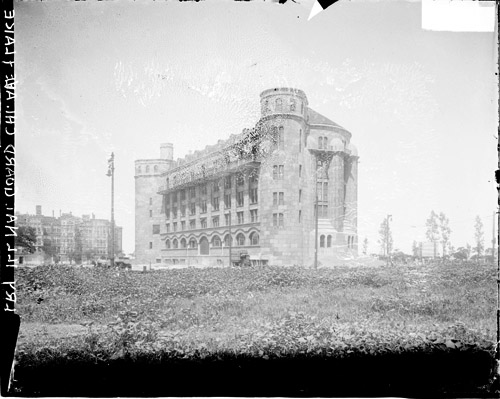
from right (1919)

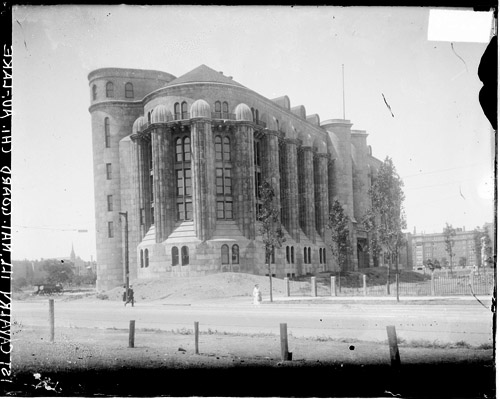
from left (1919)

In 1996, the MCA opened its current museum at 220 East Chicago Avenue, which was the site of a former National Guard Armory between Lake Michigan and Michigan Avenue from 1907 until it was demolished in 1993 to make way for the MCA. The four-story 220,000-square-foot (20,000 m^{2}) building designed by Josef Paul Kleihues, which was five times larger than its predecessor, made the Museum of Contemporary Art (MCA) Chicago the largest institution devoted to contemporary art in the world. The physical structure is said to reference the modernism of Mies van der Rohe as well as the tradition of Chicago architecture. The museum opened at its current location June 21–22, 1996, with a 24-hour event that drew more than 25,000 visitors.

== Exhibitions ==
=== Past ===
In its first year of operation, the museum hosted the exhibitions, Pictures To Be Read/Poetry To Be Seen, Claes Oldenburg: Projects for Monuments, and Dan Flavin: Pink and Gold, which was the artist's first solo show. In 1969, the museum served as the site of Christo's first building wrap in the United States. It was wrapped in more than 8,000 square feet (740 m^{2}) of tarpaulin and rope. The following year, it hosted one-person shows for Roy Lichtenstein, Robert Rauschenberg, and Andy Warhol.

The MCA has also played host to the first American and solo exhibitions of prominent artists, such as Frida Kahlo, in 1978. Other exhibition highlights include the first solo museum shows of Dan Flavin, in 1967, and Jeff Koons, in 1988. In 1989, the MCA hosted Robert Mapplethorpe, The Perfect Moment, a traveling exhibition organized by the Institute of Contemporary Art in Philadelphia. Additional highlights of exhibitions organized or co-organized by the MCA include:

- Enrico Baj (1971)
- Chuck Close (1972)
- Lee Bontecou (1972)
- Richard Artschwager (1973)
- Thomas Kovachevich (1973)
- Robert Irwin (1975)
- Frida Kahlo (1978)
- Vito Acconci (1980)
- Magdalena Abakanowicz (1982)
- Lorna Simpson (1992)
- Beverly Semmes (1995)
- Mona Hatoum (1997)
- Tom Friedman (2000)
- Gary Simmons (2002)
- John Currin (2003)
- Rudolf Stingel (2007)
- David Bowie (2014)
- Doris Salcedo (2015)
- Kerry James Marshall (2016)
- Takashi Murakami (2017)
- Virgil Abloh (2019)
- Nick Cave (2022)

=== Recent ===
In 2006, the MCA was the only American museum to host Bruce Mau's Massive Change exhibit, which concerned the social, economic, and political effects of design. Additional 2006 exhibitions featured photographers Catherine Opie and Wolfgang Tillmans as well as Chicago-based cartoonist Chris Ware. The 2008 Koons retrospective broke the attendance record with 86,584 visitors for the May 31 – show of September 21, 2008. This was the culminating exhibit of the 2008 fiscal year, which celebrated the 40th anniversary of the museum.

In 2009, the MCA presented Jeremy Deller's exhibition It Is What It Is: Conversations About Iraq. The exhibition was organized by the New Museum, and it was a new commission by the New Museum, New York; the Museum of Contemporary Art, Chicago; and the Hammer Museum, Los Angeles.

Co-organized by the San Francisco Museum of Modern Art and the Wexner Center for the Arts, the MCA presented Luc Tuymans from October 2010 – January 2011. Susan Philipsz: We Shall Be All was presented at the MCA February – June 2011. The Turner Prize-winning artist's sound exhibition featured protest songs and drew from Chicago's labor history. The exhibition Eiko & Koma: Time is Not Even, Space is Not Empty was the first series of stage performances and a gallery exhibition presented at the MCA. The Japanese-born choreographers and dance artists performed and exhibited from June – November 2011.

In 2014, the MCA was the only US venue to mount the David Bowie Is exhibition, which broke previous attendance records for the museum. To date, the most attended exhibition is the 2017 Takashi Murakami: The Octopus Eats Its Own Leg exhibit, which broke the David Bowie Is record set in 2014 with over 193,000 attendees.

Following David Bowie Is, the MCA debuted the critically acclaimed exhibition Kerry James Marshall: Mastry in 2016. Mastry later traveled to the Metropolitan Museum of Art, New York, and the Los Angeles Museum of Contemporary Art. In 2017, the MCA curated a show by the Japanese artist Takashi Murakami which set attendance records, and in 2019, the museum launched a mid-career retrospective for the work of the American designer Virgil Abloh, a sometime collaborator of Murakami's.

In 2020, the MCA opened Duro Olowu:Seeing Chicago, a curated exhibition by Duro Olowu of over 350 artworks from Chicago which marked the first time the museum had hired a guest art curator.

In 2022, the MCA presented Nick Cave: Forothermore, the Chicago artist’s first career-spanning retrospective.

Slow Dance, curated byJadine Collingwood, Pamela Alper Associate Curator, with Korina Hernandez, Curatorial Assistant, opened in September of 2026 and is scheduled to run until March of 2027. In a multidisciplinary exhibit, it features Brendan Fernandes, Gordon Hall, Geumhyung Jeong, Carolyn Lazard, Melanie McLain, and Cally Spooner, described as "six artists who use performance to reclaim forms of slowness that resist the contemporary demand to constantly perform, whether in the public sphere, on social media, or in the workplace."

=== Recurring programs ===
After a 10-year run, the exhibition series UBS 12x12: New Artists/New Work is moving from the second floor to the third floor, into a larger gallery space and will change its name to Chicago Works. The exhibition series will still feature Chicago-area artists. Rather than each artist being displayed for one month, each exhibition in the series will now be displayed for three months.

Starting in 2002, the MCA began commissioning artists and architects to design and construct public art for the front plaza. The goal of the program is to link the museum to its neighboring community by extending its programmatic, educational, and outreach functions. While artists have been exhibited intermittently on the MCA plaza since 2002, the summer 2011 plaza exhibit showcasing four works by Miami-based sculptor Mark Handforth marks a revitalization of the plaza project.

From October through May, the MCA hosts monthly Family Days, which feature artistic activities for all ages. Each summer, the museum hosts Tuesdays on the Terrace, a jazz performance series, and a Farmers Market on the MCA plaza on Tuesdays from June through October.

== Performance ==
The MCA Stage has featured local, national, and international theater, dance, music, multimedia, and film performances. It is known as the "most active interdisciplinary arts presenter in Chicago" and partners with local community organizations for the co-presentations of performing arts.

Notable MCA Stage appearances include performances by Mikhail Baryshnikov, eighth blackbird, Peter Brook, Marie Chouinard, Merce Cunningham, Philip Glass, Martha Graham, Akram Khan, Taylor Mac, and Twyla Tharp.

In September 2022, the MCA Stage hosted the first annual Chicago Performs, a two-day festival of experimental dance, music, and theater that included admission to the museum and other related programs. The festival spotlighted three local artists whose multi-disciplinary performance pieces were shown within the museum in a series of ticketed and non-ticketed performances.

Every spring, MCA presents an annual suite of live, digital, and durational performance works in its On Stage series. Both Chicago Performs and On Stage are yearly programs at the Museum.

== Building ==
The five-story limestone and cast-aluminum structure was designed by Berlin architect Josef Paul Kleihues. The building, which opened in 1996, contains 45,000 square feet (4,200 m^{2}) of gallery space (seven times the space of the old museum), a theater, studio-classrooms, an education center, a museum store, a restaurant-café, and a sculpture garden. The MCA building was Kleihues's first American structure. Its construction cost US$46.5 million ($95.5 million today). The sculpture garden, which is 34,000 square feet (3,200 m^{2}), includes a sculptural installation by Sol LeWitt and sculptures by George Rickey and Jane Highstein. The floor plan of both the building and the sculpture garden is a square, on which the proportions of the building is based.

The building's main entrance, which is accessed by scaling 32 steps, uses both symmetry and transparency as themes for its large central glass walls that compose the majority of both the east and west façades of the building. Two additional entrances—into the education center and into the museum store—are located on either side of the main staircase. The monumental staircase with projecting bays and plinths that may be used as the base for sculpture is reminiscent of the Propylaia of the Acropolis of Athens. The main level entry hall has an adjacent 55-foot (16.8 m) atrium that connects it to a restaurant in the rear of the building. Two galleries for temporary exhibitions flank the atrium. The stairwell in the northwest corner is often cited as the buildings most interesting and dynamic artistic feature. The elevated views of Lake Michigan are considered to be a rewarding feature of the building. The building's 56-foot (17.1 m) glass facade sits atop 16 feet (4.9 m) of Indiana limestone. The building is known for its hand-cast aluminum panels adjoined to the facade with stainless steel buttons. The building has two two-story gallery spaces and a smaller one-story gallery space on the second floor. The third floor has a gallery and exhibition space in its northwest section, and the fourth floor has two large galleries, an exhibition space on the west side of the building, and a gallery in the southwest section.

The museum has a 296-seat multi-use theater with a proscenium-layout stage. The seats are laid out in 14 rows with two side aisles. The stage is 52 by 34 feet (16 m × 10 m) and elevated 36 inches (0.91 m) above the floor level of the first row of seats. The house has a 12 degree incline. The stage has three curtains and four catwalks. For its 50th anniversary in 2017, the museum unveiled a $16 million renovation by architects Johnston Marklee, which redesigned 12,000 square feet (1,100 m^{2}) within the existing footprint of the original Joseph Paul Kleihues design.

In 2017, the MCA commissioned architects Johnston Marklee to redesign select public spaces of the museum to create three major offerings: Marisol, the ground-floor destination restaurant with an immersive art environment by international artist Chris Ofili; a social engagement space called the Commons on the second floor with an installation by Pedro y Juana; and a new third floor with classrooms and a flexible meeting space that puts learning at the very center of the museum. This major $16-million renovation converted 12,000 square feet (1,100 m^{2}) of interior space and coincided with the MCA's 50th anniversary.

=== Critical review ===
Complaining that the structure has a more fortress-like exterior than the museum's earlier home, Kamin viewed the architectural attempt as a fumbled work. However, he considered the interior to be serene and contemplative in a manner that complements the contemporary art and compact and organized in a manner that is an improvement on the more traditional mazelike museums. Comparing the building to the Sullivan Center and the Art Institute of Chicago Building, Kamin describes the museum as an homage to two of Chicago's architectural influences: Ludwig Mies van der Rohe and Louis Sullivan. Other critics also note the presence of Mies van der Rohe's spirit in the architecture.

Chicago-based architect Douglas Garofalo has described the building as stark, intimidating and "incongruous with contemporary sensibilities". The interior atrium, which the architect claims links the city to the lake is part of a transcendent space that benefits from the sunlight that enters through the high glass walls. The building is said to be designed to separate the art from other distracting services and functions of the venue. Kamin was also pleased with the separate entrances on the main floor for the museum store and accessibility entrances.

== Mission and vision ==
MCA’s mission statement describes itself as “an innovative center of contemporary art where the public can experience the work and ideas of living artists, and understand the historical, social, and cultural context of the art of our time.” In alignment with that, MCA collects many works by historically underrepresented artists “with rates more than twice the national average for the work of women (25 percent of acquisitions), four times the national average for Black American artists (almost 10 percent), and seven times the national average for the work of Black American female artists (3.6 percent).”

Announced by the Chicago Tribune in June 2011, the MCA initiated the process of reinventing its identity with new curators, a new floor plan, and a new vision. MCA Director Madeleine Grynsztejn stated the museum sought to be 50/50 artist-activated/audience-engaged. The main floor's north and south galleries present exhibitions showcasing the museum's permanent collection and work by post-emerging contemporary artists. The third floor is for the Chicago Works series. The fourth floor has gallery spaces for the MCA Screen and MCA DNA series, while the main barrel-vaulted galleries is for special exhibitions.

== Collection ==
The museum's collection consists of about 2,700 objects, as well as more than 3,000 artist's books. The collection includes works of art from 1945 to the present.

Former MCA Chief Curator Elizabeth A. T. Smith provided a narrative of the museum's collection. She says the collection has examples of late surrealism, pop art, minimalism, and conceptual art from the 1940s through the 1970s; work from the 1980s that can be grouped under postmodernism; and painting, sculpture, photography, video, installation, and related media current artists explore.

=== Notable works ===
- Study for a Portrait, 1949, by Francis Bacon
- Les merveilles de la nature (The Wonders of Nature), 1953, René Magritte
- Polychrome and Horizontal Bluebird, 1954, by Alexander Calder
- In Memory of My Feelings – Frank O'Hara, 1961, by Jasper Johns
- Retroactive II, 1963, by Robert Rauschenberg
- Jackie Frieze, 1964, by Andy Warhol
- Untitled, 1970, Donald Judd
- Untitled Film Still, #14, 1978, by Cindy Sherman
- Farmer's Dream, 1980, by Richard Hunt
- Rabbit, 1986, by Jeff Koons
- Cindy, 1988, by Chuck Close
- Presenting Negro Scenes Drawn Upon My Passage through the South and Reconfigured for the Benefit of Enlightened Audiences Wherever Such May Be Found, By Myself, Missus K.E.B. Walker, Colored, 1997, by Kara Walker

During the 2008 fiscal year, the MCA celebrated its 40th anniversary, which inspired gifts of works by artists such as Dan Flavin, Alfredo Jaar, and Thomas Ruff. Additionally, the museum expanded its collection by acquiring the work of some of the artists it presented during its anniversary celebration such as Carlos Amorales, Tony Oursler, and Adam Pendleton. In 2022, collector and entrepreneur Dimitris Daskalopoulos gifted to the MCA Chicago 100 works from the D.Daskalopoulos Collection. The Museum acquired joint ownership of the pieces with the Solomon R. Guggenheim Museum.

== Operations ==
=== Governance ===
The board of trustees is composed of 6 officers, 16 life trustees, and more than 46 trustees. In June 2025, the MCA announced the appointment of William "Bill" Silverstein as the new chair of the board.

=== Directors ===
- 1998–2008: Robert Fitzpatrick
- 2008–present: Madeleine Grynsztejn

On March 17, 2026, Grynsztejn announced that she would end her tenure as Director at the end of 2026.

=== Staff ===
The museum has a director, who oversees the MCA's staff of about 100. The museum operates with three programming departments: Curatorial, Performance, and Learning and Public Programs. The curatorial staff consists of James W. Alsdorf Chief Curator René Morales, Manilow Senior Curator Jamillah James, Marilyn and Larry Fields Curator Carla Acevedo Yates, Curator of Performance Tara Aisha Willis, Pamela Alper Associate Curator Bana Kattan, and Assistant Curator Jadine Collingwood.

=== Visitors ===
The museum is closed Mondays and is open from 10 a.m. to 5 p.m. on Wednesdays through Sundays, with extended hours of operation on Tuesdays until 9 p.m. While the museum has no mandatory admission charge, suggested admission is $15 for adults and $8 for students, teachers and seniors. Admission is free for MCA members, members of the military and all youth, 18 and under. It currently provides free admission to Illinois residents every Tuesday. During the summers, the museum provides free outdoor Tuesday Jazz concerts. In addition to art exhibits, the museum offers dance, theater, music, and multidisciplinary arts. The programming includes primary projects and festivals of a broad spectrum of artists presented in performance, discussion, and workshop formats.

=== Funding ===
The museum operates as a tax-exempt non-profit organization, and its exhibitions, programming, and operations are member-supported and privately funded.

In 2020, the museum's endowment was at $127 million. In 2009, it reported $17.5 million in both operating income, 50% of which came from contributions, and operating expenses. Contributions were received from individuals, corporations, foundations, government entities, and fundraising. In 2016, the museum reported $23 million in both operating income and operating expenses. 60.3% came from contributions.

== See also ==
- Architecture of Chicago
- List of contemporary art museums
- List of museums and cultural institutions in Chicago
- Visual arts of Chicago
