= Black Orpheus (disambiguation) =

Black Orpheus is a 1959 film directed by Marcel Camus. Black Orpheus may also refer to:

- Black Orpheus (album), a 2003 album by Keziah Jones
- Black Orpheus (magazine) founded by Ulli Beier in 1957
- "Manhã de Carnaval" (sometimes called "Black Orpheus"), a jazz standard by Luiz Bonfá from the film's soundtrack
- "Orphée Noir", a 1948 essay by Jean-Paul Sartre

== See also ==
- Orpheus (disambiguation)
