= Neurotica =

Neurotica may refer to:

- Neurotica, 1998–2001 Modern Living Han Hoogerbrugge
- Neurotica (magazine) Beat era magazine
- Neurotica, novel by Sue Margolis
- Neurotica (band)
- Neurotica (album), by Redd Kross
- "Neurotica", song by King Crimson from Beat
- "Neurotica", song by Rush from Roll the Bones
- "Neurotica", song by Keziah Jones from Black Orpheus Limited Edition
- "Neurotica", song by Cud (band)
- "Neurotica", song by Meshuggah from Chaosphere
- "Neurotica", song by Polyphia from Remember That You Will Die
- "Neurotica", comic strip by Allison "Big Al, the gal" Garwood
