= Mike Andersen =

Danish blues and soul songwriter, guitarist, singer

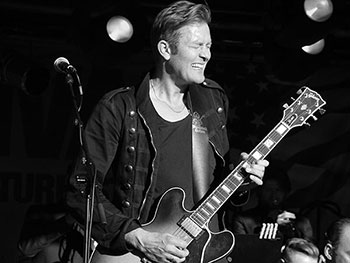

Background information
- Born: Mikkel Dybdal Andersen; February 25, 1977 (age 49); Rødekro, Denmark
- Genres: Blues, soul, rhythm & blues, blue-eyed soul
- Occupations: Musician, songwriter, bandleader
- Instruments: Vocals, guitar
- Years active: 1997–present
- Labels: Black & Tan Records; Custom Records
- Member of: Mike Andersen Band; Mike Andersen Duo
- Members: Mike Andersen: vocal, guitar Johannes Nørrelykke: guitar, vocal Kristian Fogh: Keyboards; Kristian Kold: Bass guitar Jens Kristian Dam: Drums
- Website: http://www.mikeandersen.com]

Mike Andersen (born Mikkel Dybdal Andersen, February 25, 1977, Rødekro, Denmark) is a Danish songwriter, singer and guitarist and bandleader of the Mike Andersen Band.

== Musical career ==
Already at 12 years of age, blues, rhythm & blues and African-American music had taken a firm grip on Andersen. While everyone around him in Denmark was listening to a mix of Wham!, Duran Duran and Madonna, he practised guitar along with the LPs of Lightning Hopkins, B. B. King, Muddy Waters, John Lee Hooker, Albert King, Otis Rush and many more. Later, as Andersen focused on voices and words he ventured into the soul stars and Al Green, Donny Hathaway and Marvin Gaye were added to his collection of vinyl.

At 20, Andersen met the blues guitarist Otis Grand. Otis and his six piece band perfectly framed the music Mike had listened to his whole life, from raw urban blues to 1960s soul. Grand invited the young Andersen to one of his major shows in England where he participated as a guitarist in The Otis Grand All Star Revue at 'The Great British R & B Festival in Colne, England. When Andersen returned home to Denmark he had a firm resolve to form a six piece blues and soul band of his own.

Knocking around the blues and soul scene of Aarhus, Andersen soon cranked up his 'Blues Crew' band and quickly caught the attention of older, more established Danish musicians. Soon he formed 'The Mike Andersen Band' whose first album, My Love for the Blues was released in 2002 as one of the last 15 years most striking Danish blues albums. It was imprinted with the relentless uncompromising attitude which has characterized his career since. Another significant studio album, Tomorrow released in 2004 and The Mike Andersen Band EP of 2006 followed along with hundreds of concerts across Europe. These included opening for The Fabulous Thunderbirds and three times for B. B. King.

The 5th Annual Independent Music Awards (2005) winner in the blues songs category was Mike and the band's Stuck With Me.

During the last half of the decade, while honing his skills working with a variety of Danish local and international musicians, Andersen was busy creating a new CD to show off his band's new sound. Two plus years in the making, when echoes was released in early 2010, Andersen was heralded as "an original interpreter of the old qualities" by the music editor of the nation's second largest newspaper, Politiken. GAFFA, a leading publisher of music news in Denmark for almost thirty years wrote that echoes "is so far his best. Perhaps because . . . he dares to mix his interest in and enjoyment of the blues with his interest and pleasure in soul music." Three days later the countries leading pop radio station DR P4 named the new CD their Album of the Week. Then the music journalist Peter Widmer wrote in the Odense Music Library's news about "Mike Andersen's voice that has evolved ... with great range, and is primarily in the center of echoes, with lyrics about love, jealousy and passion as the main themes. In a bluesinthenorthwest.com review, Grahame Rhodes reviewed thus: "Echoes comes highly recommended for those who like their music soulful and full of good grooves and top notch songs.

In Trumpet Magazine, a Danish Music Union publication, Andersen told how he was able to connect with the Grammy Award winning producer and mixer Russell Elevado who finally mixed echoes.

== Discography ==
- 2002: My Love for the Blues (Five Star CD released by Black & Tan Records)
- 2004: Tomorrow (CD)
- 2006: Mike Andersen Band - EP (CD/EP)
- 2010: Echoes
- 2012: Mike Andersen
- 2014: Home
- 2015: Live
- 2017: Devil is back
- 2018: There she was
- 2019: One Million Miles
- 2021: Raise your Hand
