= Massive Change =

Exhibition and book by Bruce Mau

Massive Change is an exhibition and book by designer Bruce Mau and the Institute without Boundaries, co-authored by Jennifer Leonard from her edited interviews.

== Purpose ==
The exhibition, which was commissioned by the Vancouver Art Gallery and sponsored by Altria, looks at how design can be used as a methodology to address the problems inherent to our social, economic and political systems. The exhibit looks at the implementation of new ideas and technologies to address issues like environmental sustainability and poverty.

== Installations ==
The exhibit was divided into eleven multimedia installations based on the following themes: urban, information, transportation, energy, images, markets, materials, manufacturing, military, health, wealth and politics. The displays included a genetically modified featherless chicken bred for tropical regions and a room made of garbage including discarded VHS tapes, computer keyboards, and dolls. The exhibit was on display at the Vancouver Art Gallery for three months from October 2, 2004, to January 3, 2005. From there, the exhibit went to the Art Gallery of Ontario in Toronto for three months from March 11 to May 29, 2005. The exhibit was on display at the Museum of Contemporary Art in Chicago from September 16, 2005, to December 31, 2006.

== Other venues ==
The exhibition has also spawned a book co-authored by the curator Bruce Mau, with Jennifer Leonard, a weekly electronic newsletter, and a radio show on CIUT 89.5 at the University of Toronto, created and hosted by Jennifer Leonard.
