= African Space Craft =

Studio album by Keziah Jones
- Released: March 27, 1995
- Recorded: Town House Three Studios, London; Sorcerer Sound, New York; Trinity, London
- Length: 54:34
- Label: Delabel
- Producer: Ron Saint Germain

Keziah Jones chronology
Blufunk Is A Fact (1992)	African Space Craft (1995)	Liquid Sunshine (1999)

Professional ratings
Review scores
Source	Rating
AllMusic	4/5 stars
The Guardian	2/5 stars

African Space Craft is an album by Keziah Jones. It was released in 1995. Some of the album's songs were played on guitar using just two strings.

== Critical reception ==
The Guardian wrote that "the 'serious rock' influences paraded, Led Zep through a Level 42 filter, eventually pale and subside under the weight of an over ambitious musician stretching for something defining." The Vancouver Sun concluded that "mostly it sounds like a '90s version of Jimi Hendrix's Band of Gypsies, without the lengthy solos." The Sun-Herald determined that "the arrangements are spot on but Jones could do with a few stronger tunes and a little less instrumental free-forming."

== Track listing ==
1. "Million Miles From Home"
2. "Colorful World"
3. "Prodigal Funk"
4. "Splash"
5. "Dear Mr. Cooper"
6. "African Space Craft"
7. "Speech"
8. "Cubic Space Division"
9. "Funk 'n' Circumstances"
10. "Man With the Scar"
11. "Never Gonna Let You Go"
12. "If You Know"

== Charts ==
Chart performance for African Space Craft
Chart (1995)	Peak position
Australian Albums (ARIA)	95
Austrian Albums (Ö3 Austria)	34
German Albums (Offizielle Top 100)	66
Swiss Albums (Schweizer Hitparade)	16
