= Liquid Sunshine =

Studio album by Keziah Jones
- Released: May 10, 1999
- Recorded: Little Matrix Studio, Studdridge Studio, Maison Rouge, Orinoco Studios, Britannia Row Studios and Laylow Studios
- Genre: Blufunk
- Length: 47:24
- Label: Delabel
- Producer: Keziah Jones

Keziah Jones chronology
African Space Craft (1995)	Liquid Sunshine (1999)	Black Orpheus (2003)

Liquid Sunshine is an album by Keziah Jones. Composer and musician Jocelyn Pook contributions to the songs Hello Heavenly, Runaway, and Teardrops Will Fall.

Drums, Bass & Guitar recorded by Paul Motion at Matrix Little Russell Street, Maison Rouge and Studdridge Street studios for Hello Heavenly, God's Glory, Liquid Sunshine, Runaway, Don't Forget & I'm Known.

== Track listing ==
1. "Hello Heavenly"
2. "God's Glory"
3. "Liquid Sunshine"
4. "New Brighter Day"
5. "Runaway"
6. "Don't Forget"
7. "Phased"
8. "I'm Known"
9. "Sunshineshapedbulletholes"
10. "Functional"
11. "Stabilah"
12. "Wounded Lovers Son"
13. "Teardrops Will Fall"

== Charts ==
Chart (1999)	Peak position
France (SNEP)	39
