= Blufunk Is a Fact =

Blufunk Is a Fact!

Studio album by Keziah Jones
- Released: 1992
- Recorded: 1991
- Studio: 145
- Genre: Blufunk
- Length: 43:57
- Label: Delabel
- Producer: Kevin Armstrong

Keziah Jones chronology
Blufunk Is a Fact! (1992)	African Space Craft (1995)

Professional ratings
Review scores
Source	Rating
AllMusic	4.5/5 stars

Blufunk Is a Fact! is an album by Keziah Jones. It was released in 1992. Jones labeled his music "blufunk". The song "Pleasure Is Kisses Within" was sampled by Mike Posner on his track "Who Knows?" (feat Big Sean).

== Track listing ==
1. "The Wisdom Behind the Smile (Cash)" – 4:07
2. "Walkin' Naked Thru' a Bluebell Field" – 3:31
3. "Rhythm Is Love" – 4:18
4. "Runaway (Slavery Days Are Over)" – 3:02
5. "Where's Life?" – 4:50
6. "The Funderlying Undermentals" – 4:07
7. "Frinigro Interstellar" – 3:12
8. "Free Your Soul" – 4:05
9. "A Curious Kind of Subconscious" – 4:08
10. "The Waxing + the Waning" – 2:47
11. "The Invisible Ladder" – 2:53
12. "Pleasure Is Kisses Within" – 3:00

== Charts ==
Chart (1992)	Peak position
France (SNEP)	56
