= Madeleine Grynsztejn =

Peruvian-born American museum director

- Born: 1962 (age 63–64); Lima, Peru
- Education: Tulane University (BA); Columbia University (MA)
- Occupations: Pritzker Director, Museum of Contemporary Art, Chicago

Madeleine Grynsztejn (born 1962) is the director of the Museum of Contemporary Art Chicago, a post she has been serving since 2008. On March 17, 2026, Grynsztejn announced that she would end her tenure as Director at the end of 2026.

== Life and education ==
Grynsztejn was born in Lima, Peru, and raised in Caracas, Venezuela, and London, England. She studied at the Sorbonne in Paris and received a BA in art history and French from Newcomb College of Tulane University. She received a MA in art history from Columbia University. Grynsztejn is fluent in English, Spanish, and French. Her husband, Tom Shapiro, is a strategic consultant to non-profits.

A former Helena Rubenstein Fellow at the Whitney Museum of American Art, Grynsztejn has been a lecturer, interviewee, moderator, and panelist on film, TV, radio, Web, and other public forums on art-related topics. She is a 2007 graduate of the Getty Foundation’s Museum Leadership Institute and a member of the Association of Art Museum Directors (AAMD), the International Council of Museums (ICOM), the International Committee for Museums and Collections of Modern Art (CIMAM), and the Commercial Club of Chicago, among others.

== Career ==
In 2009, Grynsztejn co-organized the first U.S. retrospective of the work of renowned contemporary painter Luc Tuymans. She was the Senior Curator of Painting and Sculpture at the San Francisco Museum of Modern Art (SFMOMA) for seven years, where she curated the critically acclaimed traveling exhibitions Take your time: Olafur Eliasson (2007) and The Art of Richard Tuttle (2005), which received a 2006 “Best U.S. Monographic Museum Show” award from the Association of International Art Critics. Prior to SFMOMA, Grynsztejn was curator of contemporary art at the Carnegie Museum of Art, Pittsburgh (1997–2000). She curated the 1999 Carnegie International, a globally focused quadrennial exhibition, and exhibitions of individual artists including William Kentridge, Kiki Smith, Diana Thater, and James Welling. Grynsztejn was associate curator (1992–96) and acting department head of 20th-century painting and sculpture at the Art Institute of Chicago where she curated Affinities: Chuck Close and Tom Friedman (1996) and About Place: Recent Art of the Americas (1995).

Grynsztejn began her curatorial career at the Museum of Contemporary Art, San Diego (1986–1992). She worked as associate curator and specialized in commissioning new projects with artists including Alfredo Jaar, Jeff Wall, and Krzysztof Wodiczko. She co-organized Dos Ciudades/Two Cities, a series of exhibitions, publications, and projects located in San Diego and Tijuana, Mexico, tied to the theme of the US/Mexico border.

In 2013, Grynsztejn was selected as Commissioner of the Chilean Pavilion, represented by artist Alfredo Jaar, for the Venice Biennale.

In 2017, as part of an $82M campaign leading to the MCA’s 50th anniversary, Grynsztejn spearheaded a redesign of the MCA’s free public spaces, launching a new museum restaurant, Marisol, as well as an innovative social engagement space, the Commons. She guided the project team of Sharon Johnston and Mark Lee of Johnston Marklee; Turner Prize-winning artist Chris Ofili who created an immersive environment for Marisol; Mexican design duo Pedro y Juana who designed the Commons at the physical heart of the museum; and Chicago chef Jason Hammel who garnered Marisol consecutive Michelin Bib Gourmand awards.

Grynsztejn is former President of the Association of Art Museum Directors (AAMD) where she continues to serve on the nominating committee and is a member of the International Council of Museums (ICOM) and former member of the board of governance of CIMAM, the International Committee of Museums and Collections of Modern Art.

== Major acquisitions ==
At each of the museums in which she has worked, Grynsztejn was responsible for all areas of the permanent collection of contemporary art including its growth, presentation, and interpretation. She has led acquisition programs to augment each museum’s collection with key acquisitions including works by Vija Celmins, Chuck Close, Olafur Eliasson, Dan Flavin, Robert Gober, Ann Hamilton, William Kentridge, Kerry James Marshall, Gordon Matta-Clark, Allan McCollum, Julie Mehretu, Chris Ofili, Edward Ruscha, Doris Salcedo, Kiki Smith, Robert Smithson, Richard Tuttle, Luc Tuymans, Bill Viola, Kara Walker, and Rachel Whiteread.

In 2022, Grynsztejn worked with New York's Guggenheim Museum to acquire a sizeable donation from renowned entrepreneur and art collector Dimitris Daskalopoulos. The donation is shared between the MCA and the Guggenheim Museum.

Grynsztejn reports that since 2015, the MCA has committed to featuring and acquiring the work of as many women as men, which she believes makes it the only museum in the USA to do so. “The national percentage of all museums collecting works of art by women is 11%. So we acquired work by female-identified artists at four times the rate of the national average," she added for context in an interview about her departure plans.

== Vision ==
As director of the MCA, Grynsztejn’s vision is to make the museum an “artist-activated, audience-engaged space where art, ideas, community, and conversation dynamically occur.” Grynsztejn has been working to redefine the MCA’s vision since her appointment in 2008: “Much of her time over the last two-and-a-half years has been spent re-centering the MCA’s mission on the creative process and audience participation.” In June 2011, the Chicago Tribune reported that Grynsztejn and Michael Darling, former James W. Alsdorf Chief Curator, were overseeing the redefining of the MCA vision with the ultimate goal of clarity.

Grynsztejn is currently leading and fundraising for the MCA Next Strategic Plan which is guided by three core Principles: Champion Revelatory Art; Spark Social Belonging; and Achieve Sustainable and Purpose-Driven Operations. Grynsztejn seeks to secure the museum’s next chapter through increased endowment support of groundbreaking programs; the institution-wide implementation of Spanish/English operations; a digital transformation of the museum’s online presence on par with onsite experiences; and the promise of a new art storage facility.

Grynsztejn has also been featured in Town & Country for her commitment to redefining the MCA’s vision.

== See also ==
- Museum of Contemporary Art, Chicago
- MCA Stage
