= Nigerian Wood =

Studio album by Keziah Jones
- Released: 1 September 2008
- Genre: Pop
- Length: 60:32
- Label: Because

Keziah Jones chronology
Rhythm Is Love - Best Of (2004)	Nigerian Wood (2008)	Captain Rugged (2013)

Nigerian Wood is the fifth studio album by Nigerian musician Keziah Jones. It was released in September 2008 under Because Records.

In 2012 it was awarded a gold certification from the Independent Music Companies Association which indicated sales of at least 75,000 copies throughout Europe.

== Track listing ==
1. "Nigerian Wood"
2. "African Android"
3. "My Kinda Girl"
4. "Long Distance Love"
5. "Beautifulblackbutterfly"
6. "Pimpin'"
7. "Lagos vs New York"
8. "1973 (Jokers Reparations)"
9. "Unintended Consequences"
10. "Blue Is The Mind"
11. "In Love Forever"
12. "My Brother"
13. "Yansh Control (Bonus Track)"
14. "Omo Balogun (Bonus Track)"
15. "Nigerian Funk (Bonus Track)"
16. "Coltrane Nko? (Bonus Track)"
17. "International Area Boy (Bonus Track)"
18. "Omo Lewon Lewon (Bonus Track)"
19. "Idupe 2 (Bonus Track)"
20. "L'Oke Ati Petele (Bonus Track)"
21. "Nigeria We Hail Thee (Bonus Track)"
22. Garan Garan (Bonus Track)"

== Charts ==
=== Weekly charts ===
Chart (2008)	Peak position
Belgian Albums (Ultratop Flanders)	73
Belgian Albums (Ultratop Wallonia)	31
French Albums (SNEP)	4
Swiss Albums (Schweizer Hitparade)	14

=== Year-end charts ===
Chart (2008)	Position
French Albums (SNEP)	104
