= Tom Friedman (artist) =

American conceptual sculptor (born 1965)

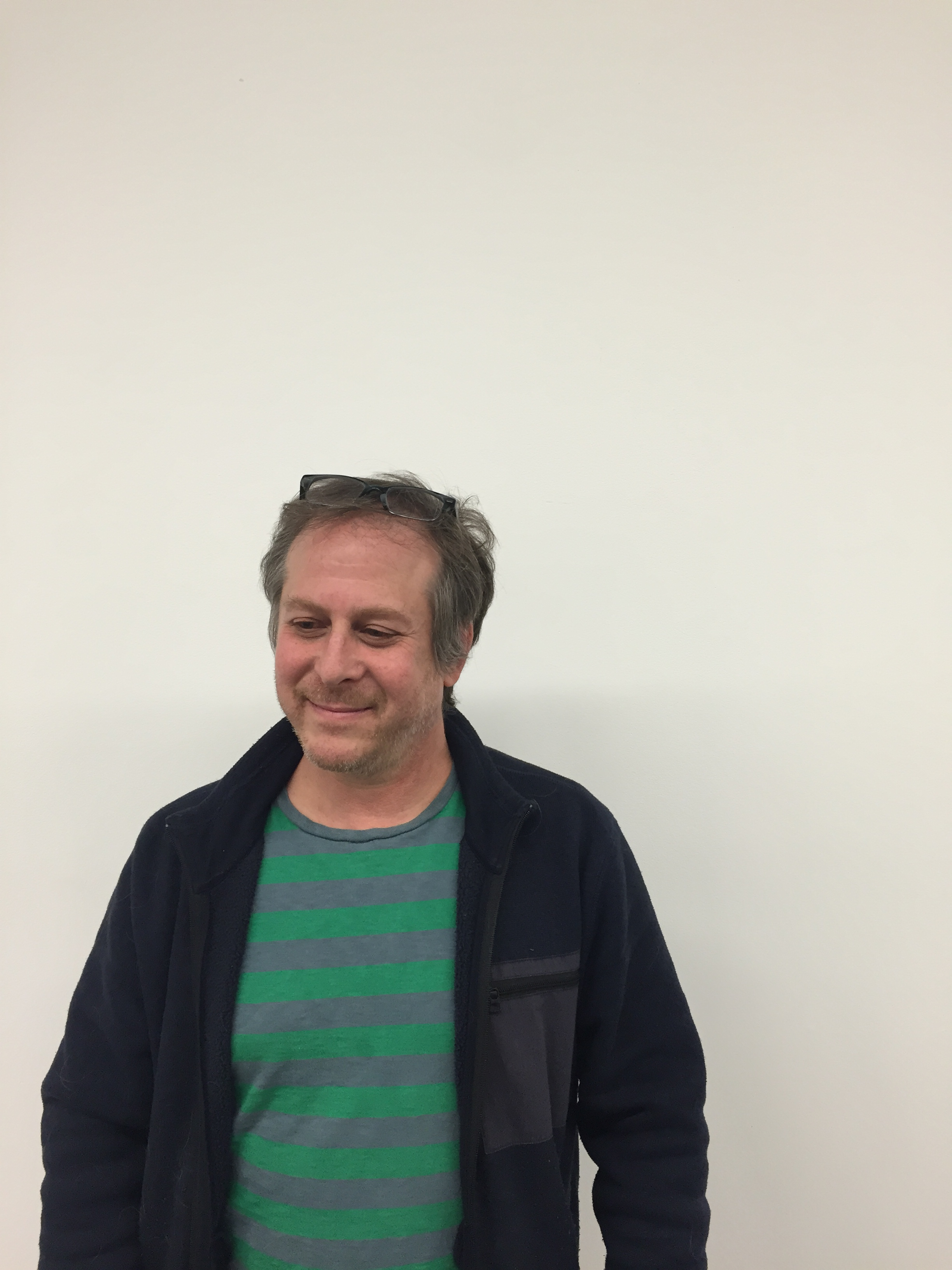
- Friedman in 2016
- Born: 1965 (age 60–61); St. Louis, Missouri, US
- Education: Washington University in St. Louis; University of Illinois at Chicago
- Known for: Conceptual Art, Sculpture, Mixed Media, Installation

Tom Friedman (born 1965) is an American conceptual sculptor. He was born in St. Louis, Missouri and received a BFA in graphic illustration from Washington University in St. Louis (1988) and an MFA in sculpture from the University of Illinois at Chicago (1990.). As a conceptual artist he works in diverse media including sculpture, painting, drawing, video, and installation.

For over twenty years, Friedman has been investigating the viewer/object relationship, and "the space in between." He has held solo exhibitions at the Museum of Modern Art, New York], Yerba Buena Museum of Art, San Francisco, Magasin 3 in Stockholm, Sweden, The New Museum in New York, the Tel Aviv Art Museum, and others. His work can be found in the museum collections of MoMA, Los Angeles Contemporary Art Museum, the Broad Art Museum, the Solomon Guggenheim Museum, The Metropolitan Museum of Art, Museum of Contemporary Art Chicago, and the Museum of Contemporary Art, Tokyo. Friedman lives and works in Northampton, Massachusetts.

== Work ==
Friedman's sculpture is recognizable for its highly inventive and idiosyncratic use of materials like Styrofoam, foil, paper, clay, wire, plastic, hair, and fuzz. Working autobiographically, he uses painstaking, labor-intensive methods to recreate seemingly random elements from his life. In each piece, he pays obsessive attention to detail, particularly in the replication of the objects that surround him.

Friedman brings humour and childlike wonder as well as grave philosophical issues to each work. With the art object as departure, he uses everyday, easily understood found materials. He says it's "enticing and seductive to start with the simple humble object that we all 'think' we know." His intent is to draw the viewer into the simple beauty and familiarity of a piece, and then invite them to investigate it further.

Although much of the published work on Friedman's art focuses on the materials, it is ultimately about the tension produced through the phenomenological experience of observer, artwork, and space in between. He often refers to his process as "orchestrating an experience." He uses the art experience as a context for opening people's minds to new ways of seeing, and thinking. To do so, he has developed a circular logic: a way of investigating the object and whittling it down to a core understanding of its metaphor and how it connects to the viewer, in their everyday life, and within societal and philosophical constructs, and then back to the object again.

== Career ==
Friedman worked closely with Feature Inc. for over 15 years. Feature was started in Chicago by Hudson. Friedman eulogized Hudson, saying, "He understood the development of an artist and their vision. He could see so clearly the evolution of consciousness of an artist, and he knew how to push the work to the next level."

Friedman held his first solo exhibition in 1991 at Feature in New York. Three years later, he made his international debut in an exhibition at the Galleria Rauicci/Santamaria in Naples, Italy and the Galerie Analix in Geneva, Switzerland. His affiliation with Feature at this time led to a relationship with curator Robert Storr, which led to an exhibition in the Elaine Danhessier Project Series at MoMa in the spring of 1995 in tandem with Bruce Nauman's "Retrospective." Friedman was the 50th artist in the series, which focuses on emerging artists. An interview with Storr at this time yielded important information about Friedman's process and circular logic.

In 1996 Friedman exhibited with Chuck Close ("Affinities: Chuck Close and Tom Friedman") at the Art Institute of Chicago, curated by Madeleine Grynsztejn. In that same year, Friedman participated in exhibitions in France and Italy, also working with curator Paul Schimmel in Brazil for the Sao Paulo Biennale. Notable works from this time period include, Everything (1992–1995), 1000 Hours of Staring (1992–1997), Untitled (Curse) (1992), Untitled (Aspirin Head) (1994) and Untitled (Toothpicks) (1995).

In 1999 Friedman was one of five resident artists (including Byron Kim, Pauli Apfelbaum, Suzanne McClelland, Lorraine O'Grady) teaching at Skowhegan School of Painting and Sculpture in Maine. Friedman met John Waters, the visiting artist of that year, who later interviewed him for Parkett Magazine. In the interview Friedman spoke of his evolution as an artist over time, as well as the significance behind his art. On the humor of his work, Friedman said, "there's this misconception that playful thinking is not serious and it's not important."

Between 2000 and 2002 a major exhibition of his work entitled, "Tom Friedman: The Epic in the Everyday", was organized by the Southeastern Center for Contemporary Art (SECCA). The show was exhibited there, and traveled also to the Museum of Contemporary Art, Chicago, Yerba Buena Center for the Arts, San Francisco, the Aspen Art Museum, and the New Museum, New York. At this time Friedman was a finalist for the Hugo Boss Prize at the Guggenheim, an honor given to artists deemed the most innovative and influential of the time. In 2002 Friedman was invited to have a solo exhibition at the Fonadzione Prada, Milan, Italy, curated by Germano Celant . A two volume catalogue was produced for the exhibition.

Friedman held two solo exhibitions at Gagosian Gallery: "New Work" at the Beverly Hills gallery and "Monsters and Stuff" in London. Both shows yielded extensive monographs.

In recent years, Friedman has built a portfolio of large-scale outdoor installations, beginning with Open Box (2007) and Circle Dance (2011), the latter being permanently installed on Brown University campus in 2012. In 2015, Friedman's Looking Up (2015) was installed on Park Avenue in New York. Another rendition of the 33.3' figure is permanently installed at the Laguna Gloria campus of The Contemporary Austin Texas. Up in the Air, which debuted in 2010 at the Magasin III gallery in Stockholm, marked his first solo exhibition in a Scandinavian country. The installation, consisting of roughly 900 suspended sculptures, continued onto the Tel Aviv Museum of Art between 2014 and 2015. In 2016, Friedman exhibited works for a group exhibition co-curated by Denise Markonish and Sean Foley entitled "Explode Every Day" at Mass MoCA, North Adams, Massachusetts.

Throughout 2016 and 2017 Friedman focused largely on standalone sculptures. Once standing on Park Avenue, Looking Up (2015) was moved to Chicago's lakefront where it will permanently remain. In addition, a third edition of the piece was installed at the James S. McDonnell Planetarium in St. Louis, Missouri. Friedman continued to work in a public forum, unveiling Huddle (2017), a 10x18 foot piece designed for the Dallas Cowboys installed at their training grounds. In late 2017, Friedman had a solo exhibition at Luhring Augustine entitled "Ghosts and UFOs: Projections for Well-Lit Spaces." The show, which consisted solely of projections, was a very dramatic shift from Friedman's previous chronology. While a departure from Friedman's past works, The New York Times praised it as, "effortlessly brilliant." In 2018, Friedman produced a large body of drawings for a solo exhibition at Stephen Friedman Gallery entitled, "Always The Beginning." The show was a reproduction and rendering of notebook pages from Friedman's sketchbooks spanning 30 years prior. In addition, Friedman released a new book of selected notes and sketches to accompany the work.

== Artistry ==
In an interview with Los Angeles-based writer Dennis Cooper, Friedman spoke in depth on the process and thinking behind much of his art. He revealed to Cooper a disdain for much of his graduate work, which led him to reconsider his image as an artist. “At this point I sort of dropped the idea of making art; it was more about "discovering a beginning." Friedman remarked. During this time period he completely emptied his studio and created an all white isolation chamber in which he would meditate on objects he brought in from his home. Friedman began at this point to move towards self described radical stages of simplification focusing on the process of his work. In pieces like Untitled (1990), eraser shaving formed into a circle, Friedman focused on repetitive actions which became for him "almost like a mantra." This study of object is also evident in his 1990 writing, Ingredients, a list of all the questions one can ask about an object, organized into three main categories. The object, the location of the object, and the viewer. The questionnaire ended up being twenty pages long.

In a 1997 interview with Hudson, Friedman elaborated on his creative process, "I play both the scientist and the experimental subject...it began as an intellectual process, but is evolving into an emotional understanding." Friedman also went on to say, "In my past work my ideas about change have been more about transformation: the material's transformation from what it is into something different. The ideas surrounding mutation and deviation are interesting to me not only in that they inform the transformation of materials, but also in how they evolve, and depart from each different branch of my investigation… the different ideas that I explore within a body of work range from ideas that opened things up for me, to unifying ideas that connect my separate branches of investigation." Friedman further elaborated on this claim in Irvine Fine Arts Center's, "Ideas in Things" in 1999, stating, "I'm involved in constructing this phenomenon of myself being absorbed by the work in such a way that one or the other of us is going to disappear - it into me or me into it."

== Awards and recognition ==
Throughout his career, Friedman has received numerous awards. In 1993 he received both the Louis Comfort Tiffany Foundation Award and the Academy Award in Art from the American Academy of Arts and Letters. Friedman also received a grant from The Joan Mitchell Foundation in 2001. Between 1993 and 1995 he was the Luther Greg Sullivan Visiting Artist at Wesleyan University and in 1999 he had a residency at the Skowhegan School of Painting and Sculpting in Skowhegan, ME. In 2013 Friedman received an Honorary Doctorate Degree in the Arts from the Montserrat College of Art.

Friedman's work has also been the subject of several books, including a feature in an eponymous Phaidon book. Charlotte Eyerman's Friedman: Up in the Air studies the solo exhibition of the same name indepth. Friedman himself has released two books, featuring commentary by Arthur C. Danto, Ralph Rugoff, and Robert Storr, among others. Friedman has been featured extensively in magazines such as Artforum and Frieze.
