= So Unreal =

Studio album by iET
- Released: February 21, 2014 (NL); March 26, 2014 (JPN); June 9, 2014
- Genre: Alternative Rock, Soul
- Length: 43:48
- Label: Analogypsy Records
- Producer: Russell Elevado

So Unreal is the debut album by Rotterdam based singer-songwriter iET.

The album was released in three phases, first in the Netherlands on February 21, secondly in Japan on March 26 and then worldwide on June 9, 2014.

== Critical reception ==
So Unreal has received generally positive reviews from music critics. Karma Bertelsen at Music Week called the album "vivacious", adding that "the album boasts a musical kaleidoscope, whilst still managing to maintain its accessibility and ease of listening". Erwin Zijlemanone of the popular blog Indie Fuzz called iET "one of the most impressive and expressive neo-soul singers I’ve heard in quite a while", adding that "producer Russell Elevado brings out the best in her". Joost Festen of 8weekly Magazine said "'So Unreal sounds mature and is irresistible", and Veronica Magazine said "So Unreal is close to magic".

== Track listing ==
No.	Title	Writer(s)	Length
1.	"Fool"	Lisa Van Viegen	4:10
2.	"Time"	Van Viegen	4:03
3.	"Innocence"	Van Viegen, Budy Mokoginta	3:40
4.	"Don't Let Go"	Van Viegen	4:43
5.	"Something Out There"	Van Viegen	4:10
6.	"The Sunlight"	Van Viegen	3:50
7.	"Hold On Tight"	Van Viegen, Mokoginta	3:13
8.	"Ways"	Van Viegen	3:56
9.	"Stay"	Van Viegen	5:29
10.	"So Unreal"	Van Viegen	6:29

== Personnel ==
- Budy Mokoginta - Electric Guitar, and all additional instruments
- Jorrijn Mette de Jonge - Logo Design
- Hugo den Oudsten - Bass
- Lisa Van Viegen - Vocals, Acoustic Guitar, Trumpet
- Optimus - Turntables
- Salle de Jonge – Drums
- Russell Elevado - Production, Mixing, Mastering
- Ingrid Baars - Artwork
