= Dust (ballet) =

- Choreographer: Akram Khan
- Music: Jocelyn Pook
- Premiere: 2 April 2014; Barbican Centre
- Original ballet company: English National Ballet
- Design: Sander Loonen; Kimie Nakano
- Genre: Contemporary ballet

Dust is a one-act contemporary ballet about World War I, choreographed by Akram Khan, music by Jocelyn Pook and created for the English National Ballet. It marked the first time Khan worked with a ballet company, and premiered on 2 April 2014 at the Barbican Centre, London.

== Production ==
=== Background ===
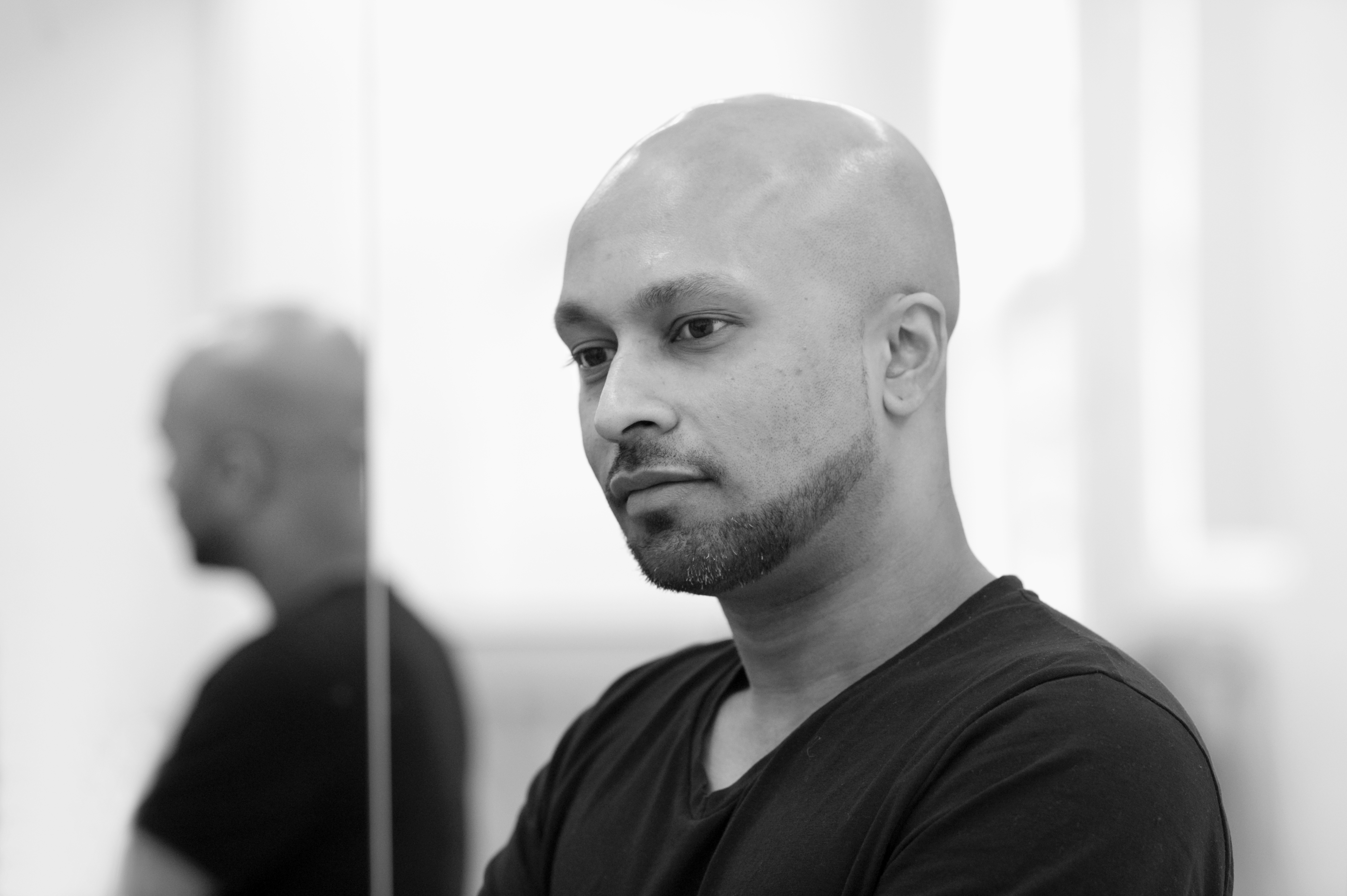
Akram Khan, choreographer of Dust

Akram Khan's Dust was commissioned for the English National Ballet's mixed bill, Lest We Forget, which is about the First World War and one of the first commissions by artistic director Tamara Rojo. For the mixed bill, Rojo said she chose choreographers who are British and from different backgrounds, including Khan, who was only trained in contemporary dance and Kathak. Though Khan had previously rejected all invitations from ballet companies, he accepted Rojo's offer, due to her "passion" and "vision".

=== Choreography ===
Khan said the ballet is "dominated by women". The first part is about trench warfare. Khan said he was "intrigued" about it as the soldiers would likely die once they leave the trenches, but continued to build them. The middle section features women working in factories while their loved ones were fighting, and the weapons they made were likely to be used to kill others' loved ones. performed by 12 female dancers. The third and last part is a duet originated by Khan and Rojo. According to Khan, it is about the relationship between women and "their loved ones at the front." Khan opted the female dancers to dance off pointe, because he needed "to know the vocabulary of pointe work more deeply, to find out what I want to say with it."

=== Music ===
The ballet uses original composition by Jocelyn Pook, who had collaborated with Khan on two other projects before. For the final section, she wrote a song with lyrics from the poem "In Flanders Fields", sung by counter tenor Jonathan Peter Kenny. She also used a recording of WWI soldier Edward Dwyer describing the war and singing "we’re here because we’re here" to the melody of "Auld Lang Syne". Pook said she had that recording prior to composing this ballet, but initially did not know Dwyer died in the war.

== Performances ==
In 2014, Dust, along with two other commissioned works for Lest We Forget premiered at Barbican Centre, which was not built for dance performances, and English National Ballet had never performed there before. At the premiere, Dust received rave reviews. Dance critic Jann Parry wrote that Dust was a "resounding success for Khan as creator." The Independent also praised the ballet, writing it was "dancing full of pain and power."

Later that year, Dust was performed at the Glastonbury Festival, danced by Erina Takahashi and James Streeter, making it English National Ballet's debut at Glastonbury.

In 2018, on the hundredth anniversary of the end of the first world war, the Lest We Forget programme, including Dust, was revived at the Sadler's Wells Theatre, including a special performance for The Royal British Legion. In 2020, a video of Dust, performed by Rojo and Streeter, was made available online by the English National Ballet in response to the impact of the COVID-19 coronavirus pandemic on the performing arts.

In February 2025, Dust made its North American premiere with San Francisco Ballet as part of the company's 2024–2025 season. Artistic Director Tamara Rojo programmed the ballet in a triple bill titled Cool Britannia, which celebrated contemporary works by British choreographers. The program also featured Wayne McGregor’s Chroma and Christopher Wheeldon’s Within the Golden Hour .

== Awards and nominations ==
Year	Award	Category	Recipients and nominees	Result	Ref.
2015	Critics Circle National Dance Awards	Best modern choreography	Akram Khan	Won	
2015	Critics Circle National Dance Awards	Outstanding male performance (modern)	Akram Khan	Nominated	
2015	Prix Benois de la Danse	Male dancer	Akram Khan	Nominated	
