= Duro Olowu =

Nigerian-born British fashion designer

- Born: 1965 (age 60–61); Lagos, Nigeria
- Occupations: Fashion designer and curator
- Spouse: Thelma Golden (m. 2008; div. 2025)

Duro Olowu is a Nigerian-born British fashion designer. He is best known for his innovative combinations of patterns and textiles that draw inspiration from his international background.

== Early life and education ==
Olowu was born in Lagos, Nigeria, to a Jamaican mother and Nigerian Yoruba father. He grew up in Lagos, spending summers in Europe He moved to the United Kingdom when he was 16, later attending the University of Kent at Canterbury and graduating with a Bachelor of Arts in Law .

== Career ==
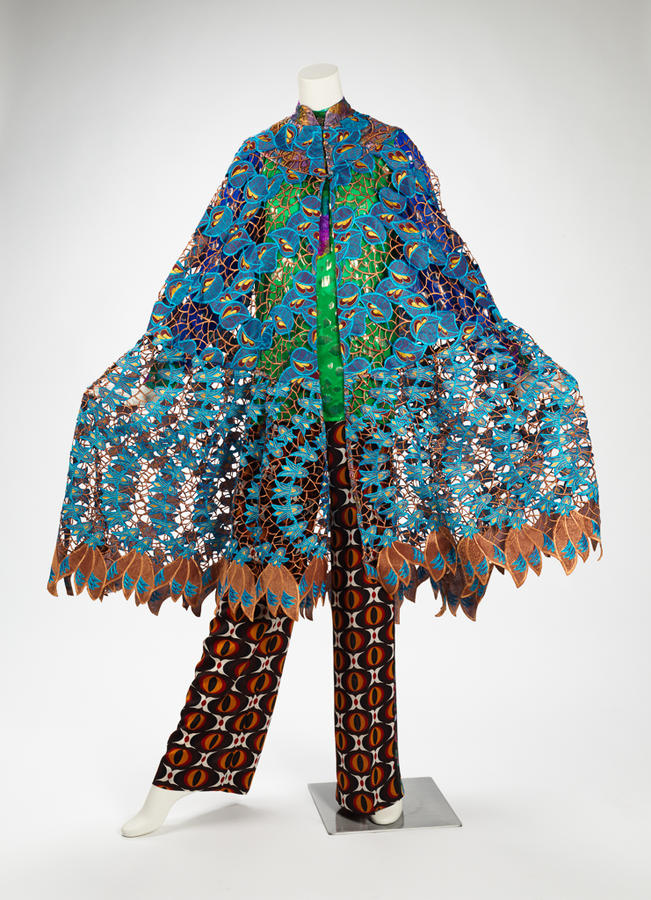
Ensemble by Duro Olowu for Spring-Summer 2013

In 2004, Olowu launched his eponymous women's wear label, beginning with a Spring/Summer 2005 collection. An empire-waist multi print silk dress from that collection, discovered by American Vogue editor Sally Singer, became an international hit. Selling out in renowned stores including Barney's New York, Browns and Harrods in London and Ikram in Chicago among others, it was hailed as the dress of the year by both American Vogue and British Vogue, and was known as the "Duro Dress."

In 2005, Olowu won the New Designer of the Year Award at the British Fashion Awards. The only designer to do so prior to their first catwalk show. In 2007, he made his runway debut at London Fashion Week. He married Thelma Golden, Director and Chief Curator of The Studio Museum in Harlem, in 2008. In 2009 he was named the Best International Designer at the African Fashion Awards, and was also one of six designers nominated for the Swiss Textile Federation's coveted prize of €100,000.

Olowu enjoyed early support from American First Lady Michelle Obama, who frequently wore his designs. In 2015, Mrs. Obama also commissioned Olowu to decorate the Vermeil Room in the White House. The designer said, "My idea [was] to create a beautiful feast for the eyes reminiscent of a warm and joyful season filled with international treasures and signature fabrics." Olowu was included in the 2019, 2020, and 2021 edition's of the Powerlist, ranking the 100 most influential Black Britons. His designs are held in the collections of the Rhode Island School of Design(RISD) Museum Collection and the FIT Museum.

In recent years, Olowu also began curating contemporary art exhibitions in galleries and museums beginning with his highly praised exhibitions, "Material" (2012) and "More Material (2014) at Salon94 gallery in New York. His first museum exhibition was 2016, the critically acclaimed, "Making & Unmaking" at the Camden Arts Centre in London. In early 2020, Olowu curated his second museum exhibition,"Duro Olowu: Seeing Chicago" at The Museum of Contemporary Art, Chicago. It features his selections of over 380 artworks from that museum's collection, as well as other institutions and private collections in Chicago. The exhibition marks the first time in its fifty-year history that The Museum of Contemporary Art, Chicago has hired a guest art curator. The accompanying publication, 'DURO OLOWU: SEEING', edited by Naomi Beckwith and published by Prestel, includes contributions from Beckwith, Madeleine Grynsztejn, Ekow Eshun, Valerie Steele, Lynette Yiadom-Boakye and Thelma Golden.
