= IET (musician) =

iET
- Born: Lisa van Viegen; January 26, 1978 (age 48)
- Origin: Rhenen, Netherlands
- Genres: Alternative, rock, soul
- Instruments: Guitar, trumpet, flugelhorn
- Years active: 2011–present
- Labels: Analogypsy Records, Northern Shore
- Website: www.ietmusic.com

iET (born 1978, birthname Lisa Van Viegen) is a Dutch singer-songwriter and multi-instrumentalist.

Born in the town of Rhenen to a musical family, she began playing the Flugelhorn at age 9, and began writing songs at 14 in her native Dutch. She briefly studied at Conservatorium van Amsterdam before leaving to pursue her own style and productions.

In 2008 whilst frequenting the pro-audio production and engineering forum Gearslutz.com she came across forum posts by producer Russell Elevado, who was searching for new artists to collaborate with. Using MySpace she contacted him and they quickly began discussing plans to record a project together, culminating in a meeting when Elevado was in the Netherlands lecturing at the Red Bull Music Academy. Over the following years, when scheduling allowed they worked on her debut album "So Unreal", finally completing it in 2013.

== Discography ==
=== Studio albums ===
- The Kitchen Recordings 1 (2011)
- The Kitchen Recordings 2 (2012)
- So Unreal (2014)
- Clarity (2016)
