= Captain Rugged =

Studio album by Keziah Jones
- Released: January 20, 2014
- Genre: Pop
- Length: 45:49
- Label: Because

Keziah Jones chronology
Nigerian Wood (2008)	Captain Rugged (2014)

Professional ratings
Aggregate scores
Source	Rating
Metacritic	60/100
Review scores
Source	Rating
Record Collector	2/5 stars

Captain Rugged is the sixth studio album by Nigerian musician Keziah Jones. It was released in January 2014 under Because Records.

== Track listing ==
No.	Title	Length
1.	"Afronewave"	3:35
2.	"Nollywoodoo"	3:37
3.	"Hypothetical"	2:54
4.	"Lunar"	4:17
5.	"Utopia"	4:30
6.	"Falling"	4:03
7.	"Memory"	3:23
8.	"Rugged"	4:15
9.	"+ the Free"	3:29
10.	"Laughter"	5:45
11.	"Praise"	6:01
