= Bruce Mau =

Polymath, designer, professor

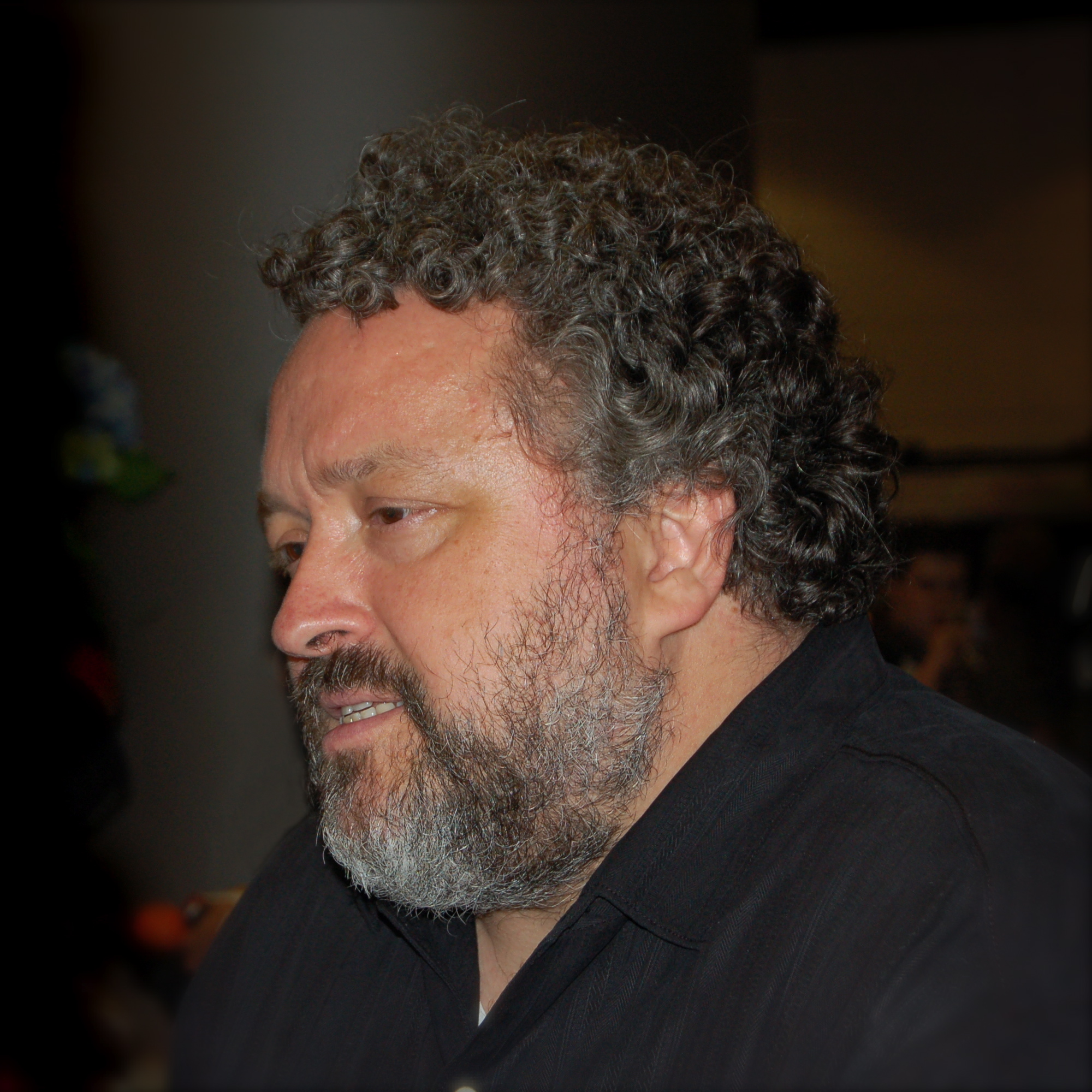
- Born: October 25, 1959 (age 67); Pembroke, Ontario, Canada
- Occupation: Designer
- Known for: Massive Change Network; Bruce Mau Design; Massive Change; Institute Without Boundaries; Freeman Company
- Notable work: The Incomplete Manifesto for Growth; MC24; The Nexus; Massive Change; Life Style; S,M,L,XL; Seattle Public Library; Zone Books
- Partner: Aiyemobisi “Bisi” Williams
- Awards: AIGA Gold Medal (2007); Global Creative Leadership Award (2009); Cooper Hewitt National Design Award (2016)
- Website: https://www.massivechangenetwork.com/

Bruce Mau RCA (born October 25, 1959) is a Canadian designer and educator. He began his career a graphic designer and has since applied his design methodology to architecture, art, museums, film, eco-environmental design, education, and conceptual philosophy. Mau is the chief executive officer of Massive Change Network, a Chicago-based design consultancy he co-founded with his wife, Bisi Williams. In 2015, he became the Chief Design Officer at Freeman, a global provider of brand experiences. Mau is also a professor and has taught at multiple institutions in the United States and Canada.

From 1985 to 2010, Mau was the creative director of Bruce Mau Design (BMD). In 2003, while still at BMD, he founded the Institute Without Boundaries in collaboration with the School of Design at George Brown College, Toronto. In 2010, Mau left the company and went on to co-found Massive Change Network in Chicago with his wife, Bisi Williams. Mau founded Bruce Mau Studio in 2020.

== Early life and education ==
Mau was born in Pembroke, Ontario, on 25 October 1959 and spent his early years in Sudbury, Ontario. He attended Sudbury Secondary School. Mau chose to study art at the advice of the high school art teacher, Jack Smith, who mentored him in his early studies. He then studied at the Ontario College of Art & Design in Toronto, and he studied advertising under Terry Isles. However, before graduation, he left the school to join the Fifty Fingers design group in 1980.

== Career ==
Mau stayed at Fifty Fingers for two years, before crossing the ocean for a brief sojourn at Pentagram in the UK. Returning to Toronto a year later, he became part of the founding triumvirate of Public Good Design and Communications. Soon after, the opportunity to design Zone 1/2 presented itself and he left to establish his own studio, Bruce Mau Design.

Zone 1/2: The Contemporary City, a complex compendium of critical thinking about urbanism from philosophers such as Gilles Deleuze and Paul Virilio, architects Rem Koolhaas and Christopher Alexander remains one of his most notable works. The firm has produced work for the Andy Warhol Museum, the Art Gallery of Ontario and the Gagosian Gallery. Mau remained the design director of Zone Books until 2004, to which he has added duties as co-editor of Swerve Editions, a Zone imprint.

From 1991 to 1993, he also served as creative director of I.D. magazine. Mau led the redesign of the magazine, which won five National Magazine Awards, with Chee Pearlman as its editor-in-chief.

He is a member of the Royal Canadian Academy of Arts and served on the Herman Miller Design Council from 2008 to 2012.

He has lectured widely across North America and Europe. He served on the International Advisory Committee of the Wexner Center in Columbus, Ohio.

In 1998, Mau produced a 43-point program called an "Incomplete Manifesto for Growth" that attempts to help designers and creative folks think about their design process; the manifesto has been widely circulated on the web.

In 2004, the government of Guatemala hired Mau to develop a system of cultural optimism to help improve the country's outlook following 36 years of civil war. When introduced, he was described as someone who would "redesign Guatemala", reflecting the ambitious scale of his project. One of his key contributions was the creation of the slogan "Guate! Amala!" (meaning "Love Guate"), a play on words designed to promote national pride. The campaign aimed to highlight positive developments in the country and showcase the efforts of those working to improve it. As part of the initiative, organizers sought to recruit 1,000 volunteers to spread the message, but 20,000 people signed up in the first weekend.

In 2006, he participated in the Stock Exchange of Visions.

In 2010 Bruce Mau and Bisi Williams founded the Massive Change Network.

In the 2010s, Bruce Mau Design was involved in the redevelopment and redesign of Ontario's ONroute service centres.

As of November 19, 2015, Bruce Mau is the Chief Design Officer for Freeman, a brand experience company and service contractor.

In September 2022, Bruce Mau and Bisi Williams undertook a collaboration with the University of New South Wales through the Massive Change Network (MCN). This was called 'Massive Action Sydney' and saw staff and students from the Faculty of Arts, Design and Architecture (ADA) form five 'Renaissance Teams' to collaborate on ways to create Massive Action across some of the challenges of our time. The project and its outcomes are ongoing.

== Awards ==
He was awarded the Chrysler Award for Design Innovation in 1998, and the Toronto Arts Award for Architecture and Design in 1999. He is a Senior Fellow of the Design Futures Council, since 2006. Mau was awarded the American Institute of Graphic Arts (AIGA) Medal in 2007. In 2007, Mau was in residence at the School of the Art Institute of Chicago, in the Architecture, Interior Architecture, and Design Objects department.

He received the Philadelphia Museum of Art's Collab Design Excellence Award in 2015, in conjunction with an exhibition of his designs. Mau received the Cooper Hewitt 2016, National Design Award for Design Mind, for his impact on design theory, design practice and/or public awareness.

=== Honorary degrees ===
Mau has received many honorary degrees including honorary doctorates from Emily Carr University of Art and Design in 2001, School of the Art Institute of Chicago (SAIC) in 2006 and Rhode Island School of Design (RISD) in 2014. Other honorary degree include an honorary fellow of the Ontario College of Art & Design In 2007, Laurentian University awarded him an honorary degree and the Columbia College Chicago awarded an honorary degree in 2011.

== Teaching ==
From 1996 to 1999, Mau was the Associate Cullinan Professor at Rice University's School of Architecture in Houston, Texas. He has also been a thesis advisor at the University of Toronto's Faculty of Architecture, Landscape & Design. He was a William and Stephanie Sick Distinguished Professor at the School of the Art Institute of Chicago (SIAC) in 2007–2008.

=== Fellowships ===
Since 2009, Mau has served as a Distinguished Fellow of the Segal Design Institute at Northwestern University. He served as an artist-in-residence at California Institute of the Arts and as a visiting scholar at the Getty Research Institute in Los Angeles.

== Personal life ==
Mau is married to Aiyemobisi "Bisi" Williams and they have three daughters named Osunkemi, Omalola, and Adeshola (named in honor of Bisi Williams's Nigerian heritage).

== Graphic design ==
- S,M,L,XL with Rem Koolhaas (1995) ISBN 0-7148-3827-6
- Life Style (2000) ISBN 1-885254-01-6
- Massive Change (2004) ISBN 0-7148-4401-2
- Eye, No. 15, Vol. 4, Winter 1994.

== See also ==
- List of AIGA medalists
