= Complaints Choir =

Community art project

Complaints Choir is a community art project that invites people to sing about their complaints in a choir together with fellow complainers.

The first Complaints Choir was organized in Birmingham (UK) in 2005, followed by the Complaints Choirs of Helsinki, Hamburg and St. Petersburg in 2006. The project was initiated by artists Tellervo Kalleinen and Oliver Kochta-Kalleinen. A video installation consisting of the documentation of the public performances of the four choirs were shown at Kiasma (Helsinki, Finland), S.M.A.K. (Ghent, Belgium) and Museum Fridericianium Kassel (Germany) among other venues. When the video clips of the choirs were distributed through online magazines and video sharing websites, the idea spread quickly to many other countries. To date additional Complaints Choirs have been organized in Bodø (Norway), Poikkilaakso primary school (Helsinki, Finland), Budapest (Hungary), Chicago (Illinois, United States), Juneau (Alaska), Gabriola Island (Canada), Melbourne (Australia), Jerusalem, Singapore, Wrocław (Poland), Hong Kong, Philadelphia, Durham, North Carolina, Enschede (Netherlands, as part of its international Grenswerk art festival) and Tokyo (Japan).

In 2006 in Singapore, a complaints choir that was to be in a festival was prohibited from performing by the government. The Singapore government's Media Development Authority refused to issue a permit because some members of the choir were foreigners and some of the lyrics touched upon "domestic affairs". Reuters quoted the festival organizer as saying, "Our conductor is Malaysian, so how could the choir go ahead without him?"

The name 'Complaints Choir' is a literal translation of the long-established Finnish expression valituskuoro; English has the expression "a chorus of complaints".

One of the complaints mentioned in the Helsinki version was that the Finns were always beaten by the Swedes in the Eurovision Song Contest. A few months later, Finland won the contest for the first time, with Sweden coming fifth.
