= Reggie Wilson/Fist and Heel Performance Group =

American dance group

Reggie Wilson/Fist and Heel Performance Group is a Brooklyn-based dance performance group created by Reggie Wilson in 1989. The group blends contemporary dance with African traditions in what the founder and choreographer terms "Post-African Neo Hoodoo Modern dance."

== Founder ==
Reggie Wilson, from Brooklyn, New York City, was born in 1967. In middle school, Wilson was a singer. He was chosen to help with the choreography of a school musical, and here became aware of his dance talents. Wilson graduated in 1988 with a Bachelor of Fine Arts from New York University's Tisch School of the Arts, where he was mentored by Phyllis Lamhut in his area of study, composition. During his early career, Wilson not only performed but also conducted and taught extended workshops and projects throughout Africa, Europe, Americas, and the Caribbean. When not performing or conducting workshops, Wilson served as a visiting faculty member for several universities, including Yale, Princeton, and Wesleyan. He performed and toured with Ohad Naharin's New York-based company before starting his own Fist and Heel Performance Group.

== Creative influences ==
Reggie Wilson's choreography is heavily influenced by the spiritual traditions of the African diaspora. He blends the deep ritual style movement with contemporary dance which is motivated by their own driving rhythms such as body percussion, aspirated breath, singing and shouts. His movement derives from the movement idioms of blues, slave and worship cultures where he believes in the potential of the body as a valid means of knowing. The group's name reflects these origins, as has Reggie Wilson explained: "Drums denied and confiscated, enslaved Africans reinvented their spiritual tradition in the Americas as a soulful art form white authorities dismissed as merely 'fist and heel worshipping.'"

Wilson's choreography reflects his extensive travels to such places as the Mississippi Delta, Trinidad and Tobago, and Africa, where he worked with various religious communities and dance performance groups.

== Stage productions ==
- Jumping the Broom (1994)
- Introduction (1996)
- The Dew Wet (1997)
- Tales from the Creek (1998)
- The Salon Pieces (1994–1997)
- Wangena (2000)
- The Tie-tongued Goat and the Lightning Bug Who Tried to Put Her Foot Down (2002)
- The Tale: Npinpee Nckutchie and the Tail of the Golden Dek (2007)
- The Good Dance (Congo Congo and His Search for the Good Dance) (2009)
- The Revisitation (2013)
- Moses(es) (2013–2014)
- CITIZEN (2016–2017)
- POWER (2019–)

== Company members ==
- Reggie Wilson (Artistic Director, choreographer, performer, and founder of the Fist and Heel Performance Group)
- Rhetta Aleong (performer, board member)
- Anna Schon (performer)
- Paul Hamilton (performer)
- Lawrence A.W. Harding (performer)
- Raja Feather Kelly (Company manager, Performer)
- Clement Mensah (performer)
- Yeman Brown (performer)
- Dwayne Brown (performer)
- Annie Wang (performer)
- Hadar Ahuvia (performer)
- Gabriela Silva (performer)
- Michelle Yard (performer)

== Awards ==
- Minnesota Dance Alliance's McKnight National Fellowship (2000–2001)
- Guggenheim Fellowship Award (2002)
- BESSIE-New York Dance and Performance Award (2002)
- United States Artists Prudential Fellow (2009)
- Herb Alpert Award in Dance (2009)
- Doris Duke Performing Artist (2012)
