= Randolph Street Gallery =

Coordinates: 41°53′2.7″N 87°38′58.4″W

Randolph Street Gallery (RSG) was an alternative exhibition space in Chicago, Illinois, from 1979 until its closing in 1998 and a vital local force in the development of a variety of new art forms and the contemporary national and international arts milieu. Founded by two artists, Tish Miller and Sarah Schwartz, RSG began in Schwartz's living room, later moving to 853 W. Randolph Street on Chicago's west side. The late 1970s, was a period when young artists in all disciplines were collectively founding visual and performing art organizations as alternatives to mainstream and commercial venues in many US cities. RSG was one of more than a dozen 'alternative' galleries - along with many new 'alternative' theatre groups - situated on the near north and west sides of Chicago. The gallery’s focus was on the needs of artists and practitioners who created work that was unsupported, or at the time, perceived to be unsupportable by most commercial or institutional funders. Randolph Street Gallery was also the locus for groundbreaking collaborative projects such as The File Room: An Archive on Cultural Censorship, conceived by Antoni Muntadas, and was the publisher of P-Form: Performance Art Magazine.

For nineteen productive years RSG fulfilled its role as cultural laboratory for Chicago and the general art world. By the late 1990s, changing trends, expectations, and patterns of patronage in the arts took their toll on the gallery as well as on any of the other few comparable artist-run organizations in the United States (e.g., La Mamelle and the Capp Street Project in San Francisco, the Washington Project for the Arts in the District of Columbia) and the gallery eventually closed.

Many of the emerging and mid-career artists who presented and experimented at Randolph Street Gallery are now recognized as leaders who have changed the context of cultural dialogue. They include visual and performance artists, photographers, filmmakers, sound and video artists, writers and curators.

In 1999, the complete archives of Randolph Street Gallery were donated to the School of the Art Institute of Chicago (SAIC) and include all available material documenting the nineteen-year history of RSG, a high percentage of which are original source materials. The archives contain historical records of performance, sculpture, visual and other art forms created or presented by local and international artists, artists’ portfolios, slides, posters, signage, photographs, performance art programs, publications, news clippings, publicity files, a variety of video formats, sound recordings, computer files, administrative records, and some works of art donated to Randolph Street Gallery for auctions and fundraisers. Public access to the archives is possible on a limited basis and by reservation only.

The Randolph Street Gallery Archives are complemented by an additional 33 linear feet of archival material from the editors of P-Form: Performance Art Magazine.
