= Keziah Jones =

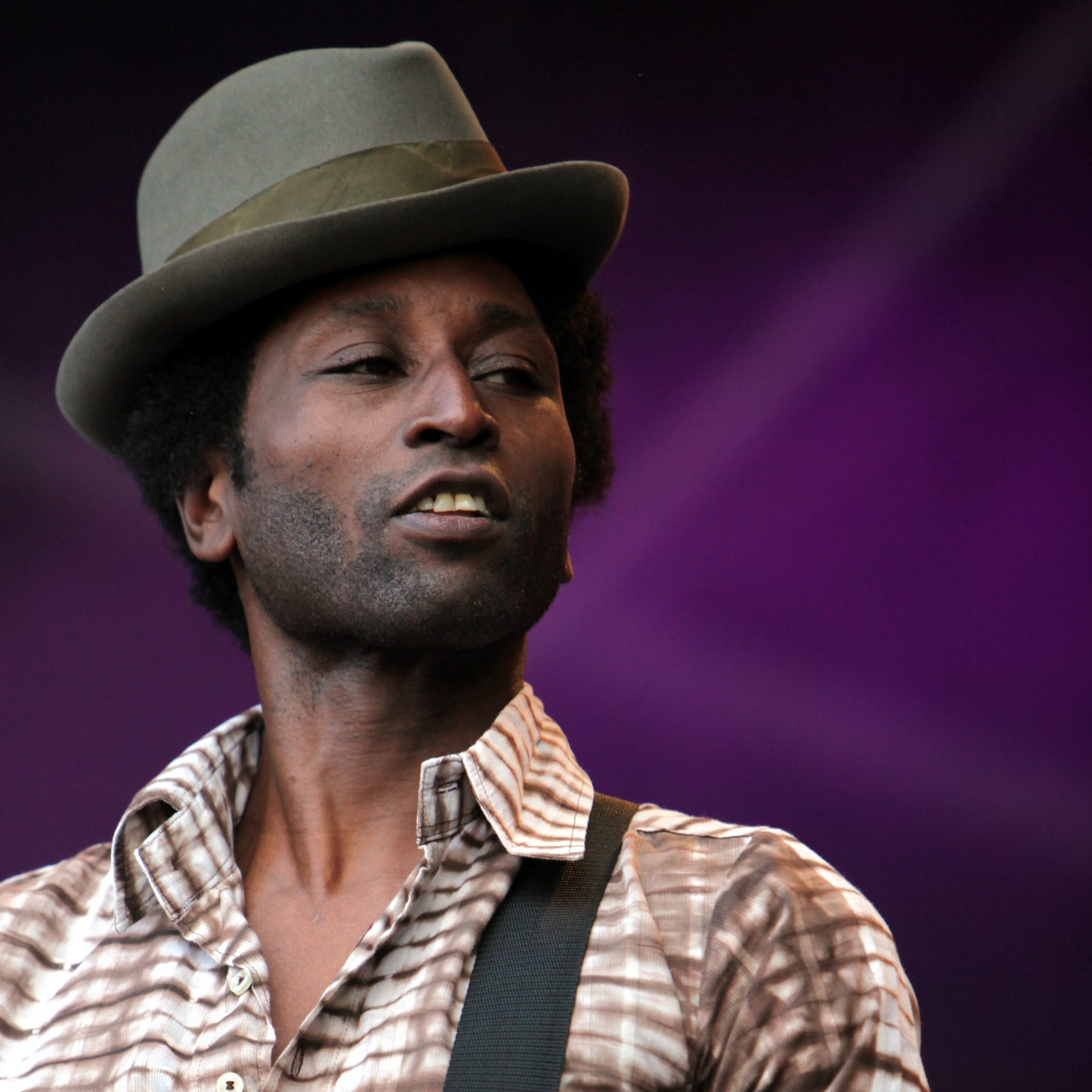

Background information
- Born: Olufemi Sanyaolu; 10 January 1968 (age 58); Lagos, Nigeria
- Genres: Blues, Funk, Yoruba music, soul
- Occupations: Musician, songwriter, photographer, poet, playwright, painter
- Instruments: Vocals, guitar, piano, bass, percussion, clarinet
- Years active: 1992–present
- Labels: Delabel Records; Virgin Records; Because Music

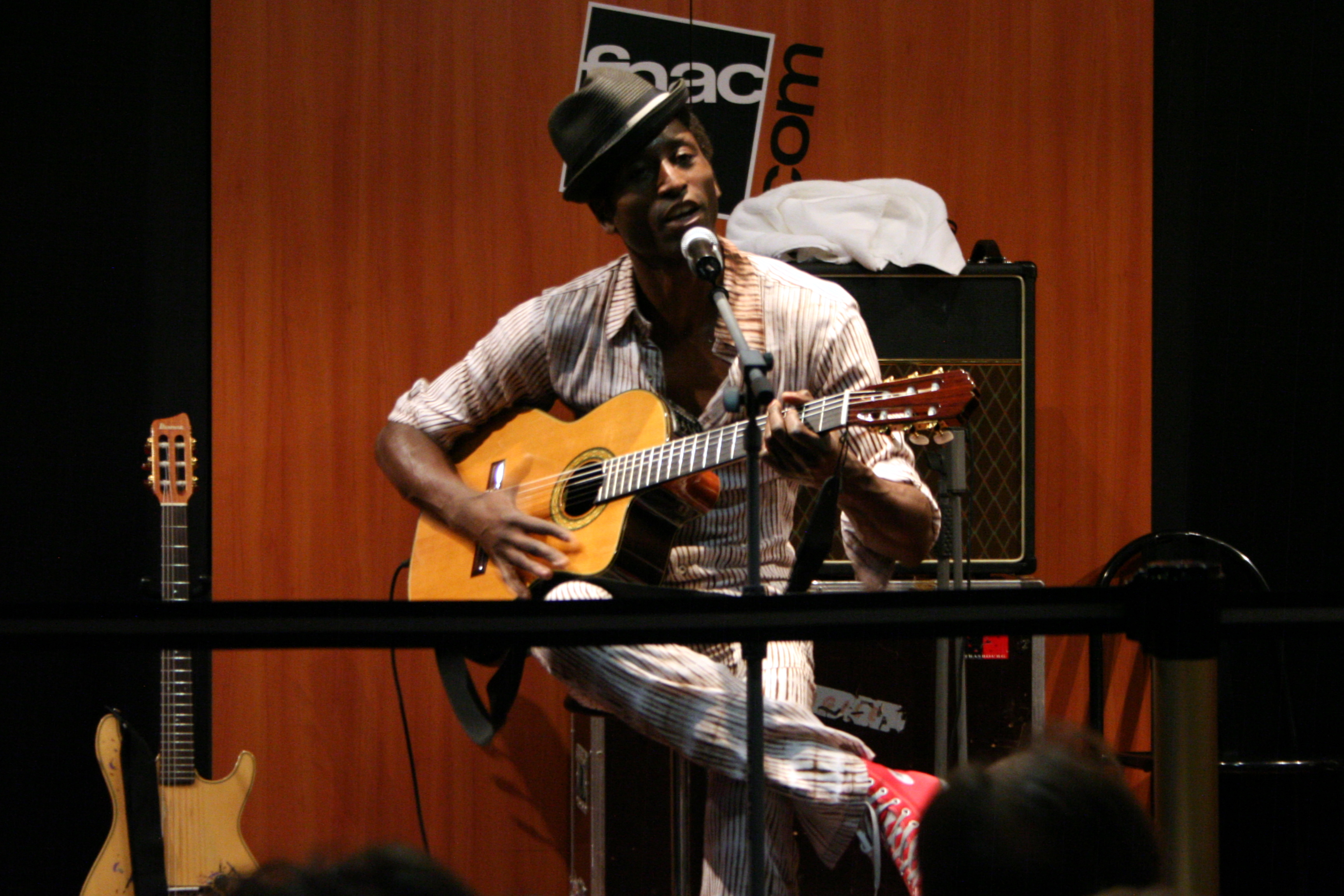
Unplugged concert in Strasbourg, France, September 2008

Keziah Jones (born Olufemi Sanyaolu on 10 January 1968) is a Nigerian singer-songwriter and guitarist. He describes his musical style as "Blufunk", which is a fusion between raw blues elements and hard, edgy funk rhythms. Also his Nigerian roots in Yoruba music and soul music can be considered a major influence on his sound.

He is known for his distinctive style of guitar playing, including his percussive right-hand technique which is similar to a bass guitarist's slapping technique.

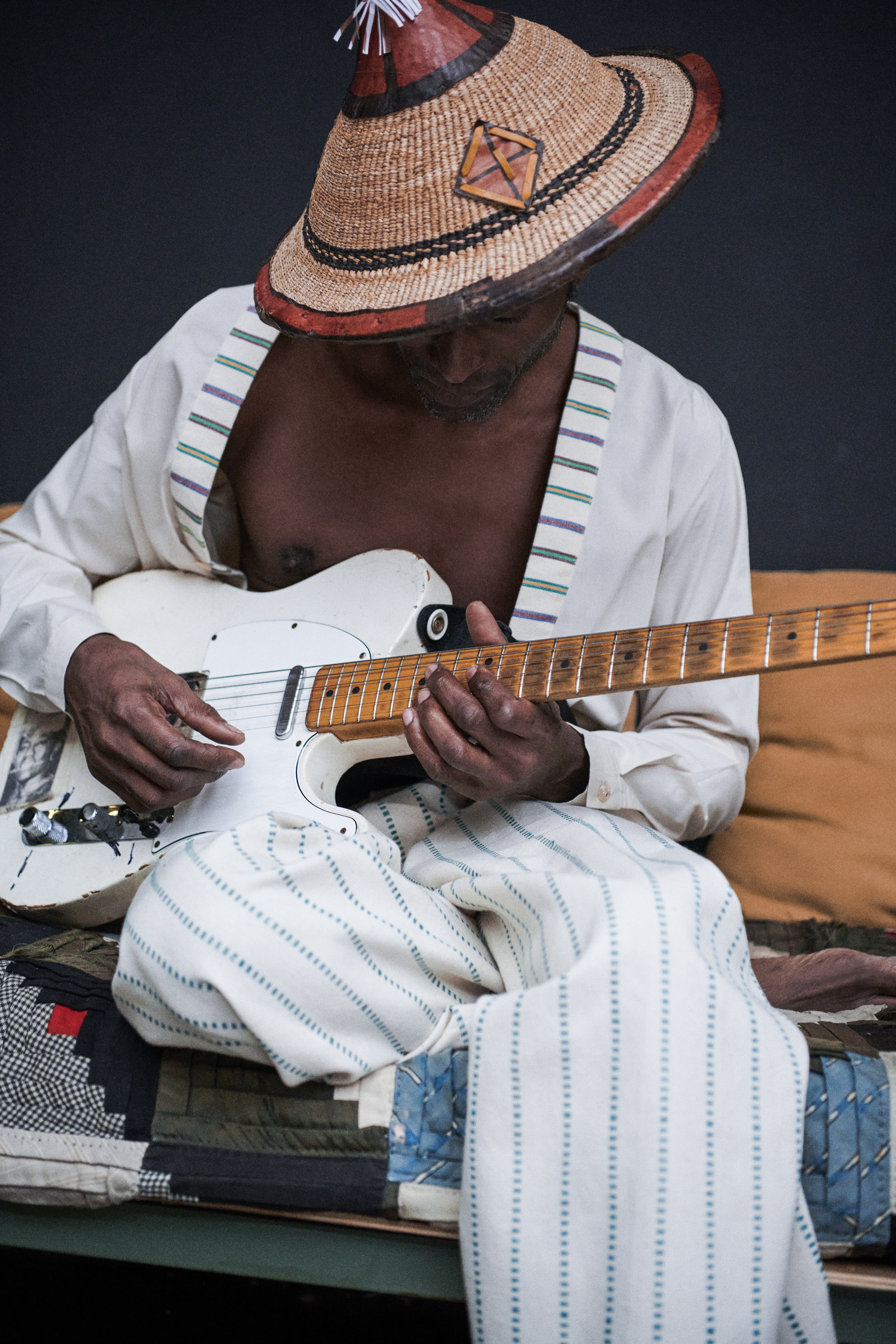
ph. Penelope Caillet

== Life and career ==
Olufemi Sanyaolu a.k.a. Keziah Jones was born and raised in Lagos, Nigeria. Son of Oshodolamu Sanyaolu, Chief of the Yoruba people and successful industrialist Abiola Sanyaolu, he was being prepared to follow his father's footsteps in the family concern and was expected to have an academic career. That is why, at the age of eight, he left Nigeria and relocated to England to attend the prestigious Millfield School in North London.

Reflecting on his experience, Jones has remarked:

"I had to find a way out of all that (English public school system), and music was it!".

By 13, he had discovered the piano and began teaching himself how to play and write songs. Three years later, he took up the guitar and started busking in London’s underground stations, folk clubs, and streets, often evading the police. In the late 1980s he moved to Paris, busking in the metro, where he was discovered by manager Phil Pickett. Jones attributes his Parisian subway experiences as highly instrumental to his by now blossoming career.

Keziah Jones developed a reputation as a distinctive musician and charismatic performer with a unique hard funk style, moving frequently between London and Paris. In 1992, he released his debut album, "Blufunk Is A Fact", which included the hit single “Rhythm Is Love” . This track gained global recognition and established Jones as a significant musical talent. Over his career, he has released six studio albums, producing hits such as “Where Is Life,” “A Million Miles From Home,” “Beautiful Emilie,” “Femiliarise,” “Kpafuca,” and “1973.”

Recently, Keziah Jones recorded his first full live album in Lagos with his long-term band, including Josh “McNasty” McKenzie on drums, Joey “Anchor man” Grant and Alex ‘Beanz” Miller on bass, and Edem “Amen” Viana on guitar. He is currently working on his seventh studio album and collaborating on various side projects, including an EP titled Class Of 89 with famed French EDM producer Philippe Cohen Solal. There are plans to expand this project into a full studio album.

== Influences and artistic vision ==
Jones cites Fela Kuti, Miles Davis, and Jimi Hendrix as his primary musical influences. His signature sound, Blufunk, is a blend of punk-funk attitude, Yoruba rhythms, and diverse lyrical themes, sung predominantly in English with occasional Yoruba. Visual arts is an integral part of Keziah’s work, himself a draughtsman.

Jones, who splits his time between Lagos, Nigeria, and Paris, France, frequently explores the relationship between the northern and southern hemispheres in his art. He aims to portray the modernity of post-colonial Africa, challenging the Western perception of Africa as a continent ravaged by famine and conflict. He highlights the vibrancy of contemporary urban African culture, particularly in Lagos, a city of 25 million people. Jones emphasizes that modern African culture thrives in music, fashion, and art, greatly influenced by the African Diaspora. He states:

“ What I want to show the world is the modernity of post-colonial Africa, far from the image that the Western world carries of a continent devastated by famine and/or war. I’m talking about young urban Africa.”

Keziah Jones continues to innovate and create, solidifying his place as a significant figure in both the African and global music scenes.

== Discography ==
=== Studio albums ===
List of albums, with selected details and chart positions
Title	Album details	Peak chart positions				
Title	Album details	AUS	BEL (FL)	BEL (WA)	FRA	SWI
Blufunk Is a Fact	Released: 23 March 1992; Format: CD	—	—	—	56	—
African Space Craft	Released: 27 March 1995; Format: CD	95	—	—	—	16
Liquid Sunshine	Released: 10 May 1999; Format: CD	—	—	—	39	38
Black Orpheus	Released: 22 April 2003; Format: CD	—	—	—	13	22
Nigerian Wood	Released: 1 September 2008; Format: CD	—	73	31	4	14
Captain Rugged	Released: 1 January 2013; Format: CD	—	—	169	58	97

=== Compilation albums ===
List of compilation albums, with selected details and chart positions
Title	Album details	Peak chart positions
Title	Album details	SWI
Rhythm Is Love – Best Of	Released: 2 November 2004; Format: CD	98

=== Collaboration albums ===
• Class Of 89 - Philippe Cohen Solal feat. Keziah Jones (2022)

=== EPs ===
- Frinigrô Interstellar (1991)
- Live (1993)
- The African Anarchist (1999)

=== Videography ===
- Live at the Elysée Montmartre (14 June 2004)

=== Singles ===
List of singles, with selected chart positions
Title	Year	Peak chart positions			Album
Title	Year	AUS	FRA	UK	Album
"Rhythm Is Love"	1992	—	40	—	Blufunk Is a Fact
"Where's Life?"	1992	—	—	—	Blufunk Is a Fact
"Million Miles from Home"	1995	92	—	181	African Space Craft
"If You Know"	1995	—	—	—	African Space Craft

== Filmography ==
Year	Title	Role
2015	Eva & Leon	
