= Akram Khan (dancer) =

English dancer and choreographer (born 1974)

Akram Khan MBE
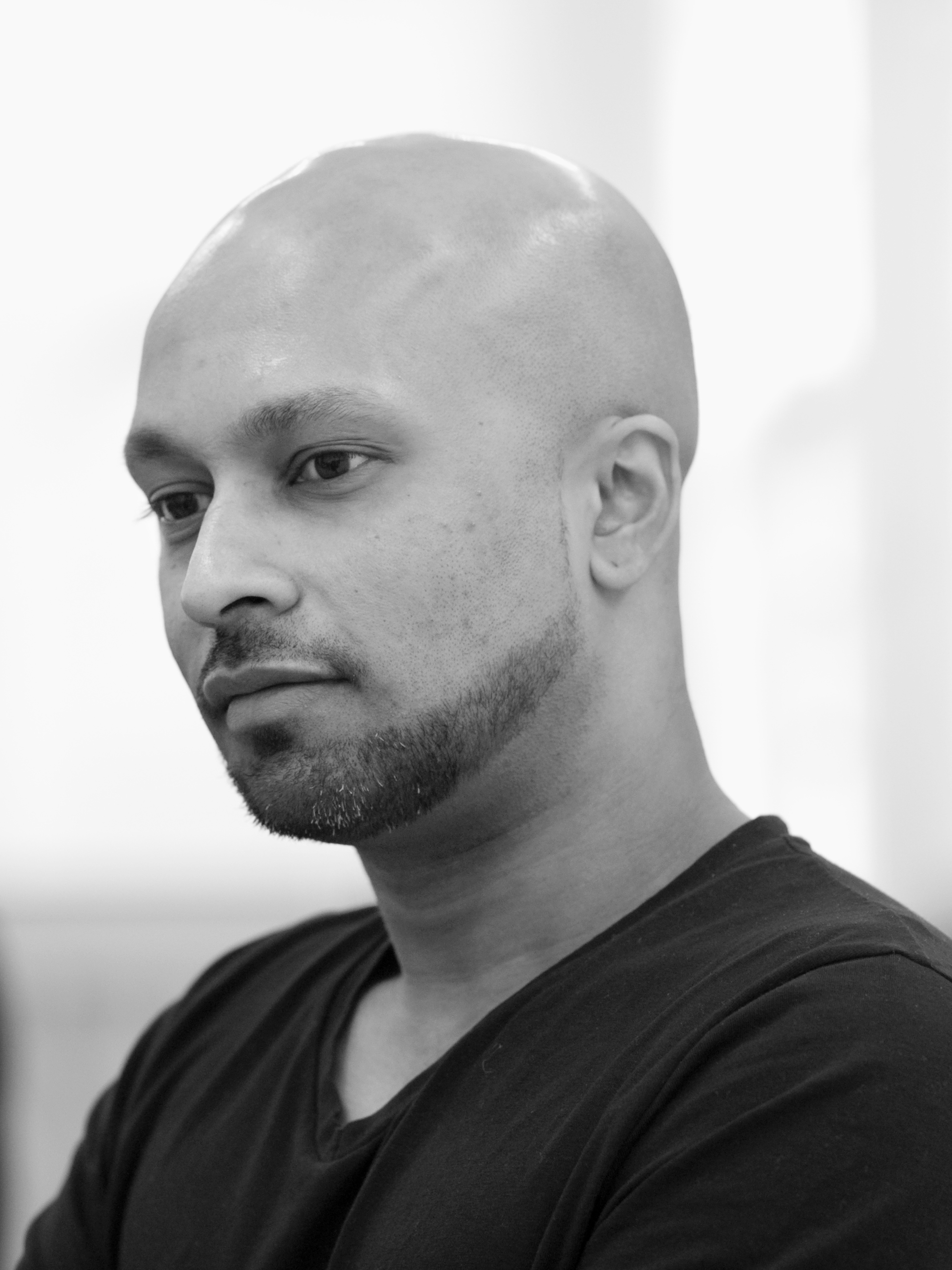
- Khan in 2010
- Born: Akram Hossain Khan; 29 July 1974 (age 52); Lambeth, London, England
- Education: De Montfort University; Northern School of Contemporary Dance
- Occupations: Dancer, choreographer
- Years active: 1987–
- Known for: Akram Khan Company
- Style: Contemporary dance, kathak
- Website: www.akramkhancompany.net

Akram Hossain Khan, MBE (Bengali: আকরাম হুসেইন খান) (born 29 July 1974) is an English dancer and choreographer of Bangladeshi descent. His background is rooted in his classical Kathak training and contemporary dance.

== Career ==
Khan was born in Lambeth, London, England, into a family from Dhaka, Bangladesh. He began dancing and trained in the classical South Asian dance form Kathak at the age of seven. He studied with Pratap Pawar, later becoming his disciple. He began his stage career in the Adventures of Mowgli tour 1984–1985 produced by the Academy of Indian Dance, now Akademi South Asian Dance. At the age of 13, he was cast in Peter Brook's Shakespeare Company production of Mahabharata, touring the world between 1987 and 1989 and appearing in the televised version of the play broadcast in 1988.

Following later studies in Contemporary Dance at De Montfort University and Performing Arts at the Northern School of Contemporary Dance and a period working with Anne Teresa De Keersmaeker's Brussels-based X-Group project, he began presenting solo performances of his work in the 1990s.

In August 2000, he launched Akram Khan Company, founded alongside former dancer Farooq Chaudhry. His first full-length work Kaash, a collaboration with Anish Kapoor and Nitin Sawhney, was performed at the Edinburgh Festival in 2002.

As choreographer-in-residence and later associate artist at the Southbank Centre, he presented a recital with Pandit Birju Maharaj and Sri Pratap Pawar, and A God of Small Tales, a piece for mature women for which he collaborated with writer Hanif Kureishi. He remained an associate artist at the Southbank Centre until April 2005, the first non-musician to be afforded this status, and is currently an associate artist at Sadler's Wells Theatre. In 2005, he was appointed a Member of the Order of the British Empire (MBE) in the 2005 Birthday Honours for his services to dance.

In 2008, he co-starred with Juliette Binoche in a dance-drama piece called in-i at the Royal National Theatre, London.

In summer 2006, Khan was invited by Kylie Minogue to choreograph a section of her Showgirl: The Homecoming Tour. Khan appeared as a huge projection behind the singer as she performed. The songs were set in an Indian temple scenario, inspired by a trip Minogue made to Sri Lanka. He has made pieces for the Ballet Boyz and Cloud Gate Dance Theater of Taiwan.

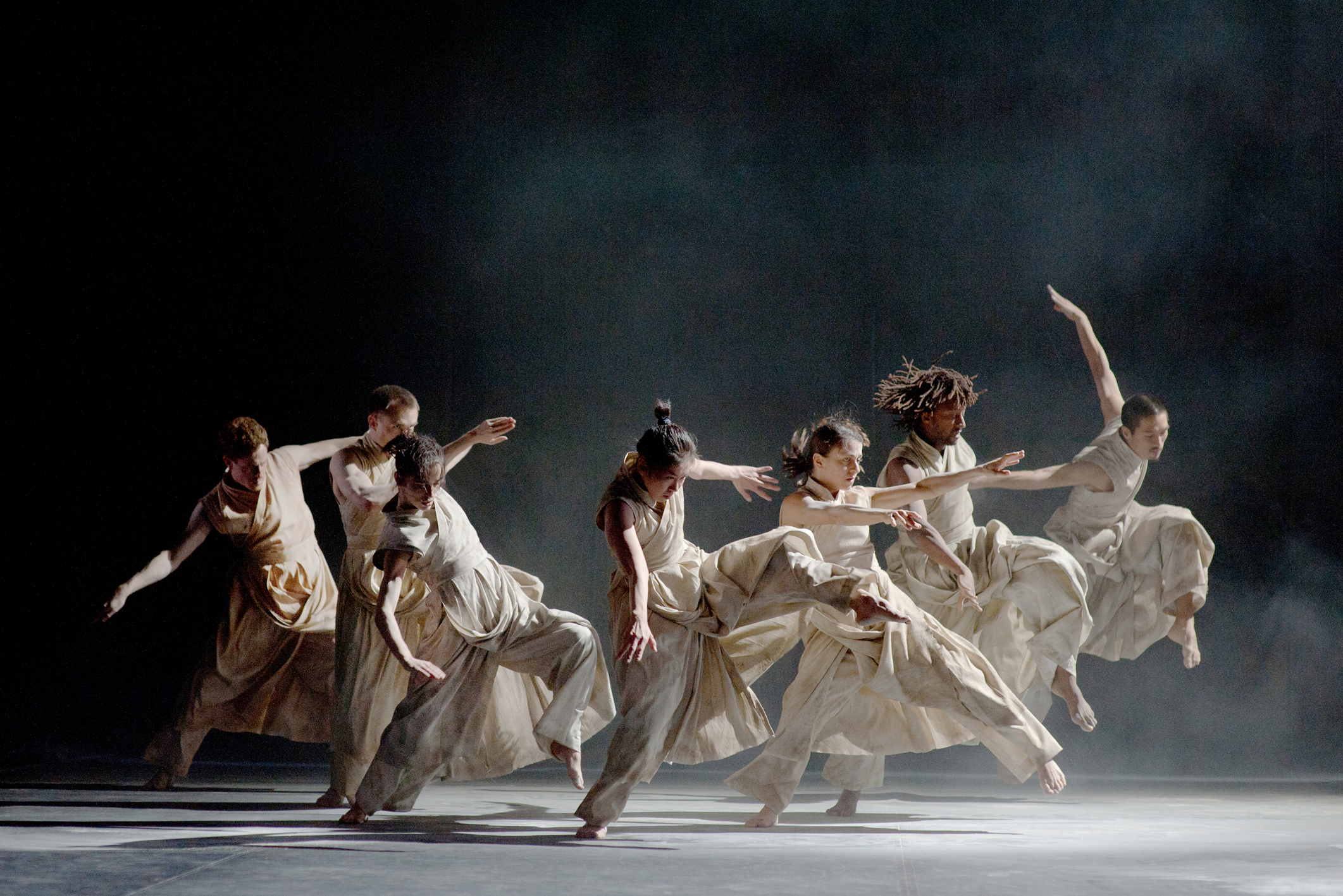
Akram Khan Company performing Vertical Road at Curve Theatre, Leicester in November 2010

Khan and his dance company performed at the 2012 London Olympics opening ceremony. Live music was provided by Emeli Sandé singing "Abide With Me".

In 2014, he choreographed for a ballet company for the first time, which was a World War I-themed ballet titled Dust, for the English National Ballet. Khan and Tamara Rojo danced the lead roles.

The Manchester International Festival announced a co-production of Giselle between themselves, English National Ballet, and Sadler's Wells Theatre that was directed by Khan and performed at the Palace Theatre, Manchester in September 2016. The critically acclaimed production went on tour to Bristol Hippodrome, the Mayflower Theatre, Southampton and Sadler's Wells Theatre, London later in that year. In 2022, English National Ballet toured Khan's Giselle at Brooklyn Academy of Music in New York City.

In June 2020, Khan had an online conversation with theatre critic and scholar Octavian Saiu. At the end, Saiu asked Khan to send their viewers a direct message for that critical moment during the pandemic. Talking about the importance of moving in a physical and spiritual sense, Khan invited everyone to "take that first step".

== Awards, nominations and recognition ==
Year	Award	Category	Result
2000	Jerwood Foundation	Choreography Award	Won
2000	Time Out Live	Outstanding Newcomer to Dance Award	Won
2000	The Critics' Circle National Dance Awards	Outstanding Newcomer to Dance Award	Won
2002	The Critics' Circle National Dance Awards	Best Modern Choreography	Won
2002	Nijinsky Award	Best Newcomer	Nominated
2002	Dance Magazine	25 to Watch	
2004	The International Movimentos Tanzpreis	Most Promising Newcomer in Dance	Won
2004	An honorary Doctorate of Arts from De Montfort University	Contribution to the UK arts community	
2005	MBE	Services to dance	
2005	The South Bank Show Award		Won
2005	Critics' Circle National Dance Award	Outstanding Male or Female Artist (Modern)	Won
2006	Laurence Olivier Award	Zero Degrees (Akram Khan, Sidi Larbi Cherkaoui, Antony Gormley & Nitin Sawhney) for Best New Dance Production	Nominated
2007	International Theatre Institute	Excellence in International Dance Award	Won
2007	Helpmann Awards, Sydney, Australia	Best Male Dancer	Won
2007	Helpmann Awards, Sydney, Australia	Zero Degrees for "Best Choreography in a Ballet or Dance Work" Award	Won
2010	Critics' Circle National Dance Awards	[Akram Khan Company dancers – Eulalia Ayguade Farro (Vertical Road, Bahok) & Yoshie Sunahata (Gnosis) for Outstanding Female Performance (Modern)]	Nominated
2010	South Bank Show Award		Won
2010	The Age Critics Award	Outstanding new work for Vertical Road at the Melbourne International Arts Festival.	Won
2011	International Society for the Performing Arts	Distinguished Artist Award	Won
2012	Laurence Olivier Award	DESH – Akram Khan Company for Best New Dance Production	Won
2015	The Critics' Circle National Dance Awards	Best Modern Choreography	Won
2015	The Critics' Circle National Dance Awards	Outstanding male performance (modern)	Nominated
2016	Prix Benois de la Danse	Male dancer	Won

== See also ==
- British Bangladeshi
- List of British Bangladeshis
- What Do Artists Do All Day?
