= Black Orpheus (album) =

Studio album by Keziah Jones
- Released: April 22, 2003
- Studios: Livingston Studios, Squirrel Mountain, Fortress Studios, AGM Studios, Kad Records
- Genres: Blues, funk
- Length: 54:23
- Label: Delabel
- Producer: Kevin Armstrong

Keziah Jones chronology
Liquid Sunshine (1999)	Black Orpheus (2003)	Rhythm Is Love – Best Of (2004)

Alternative cover
- 2004 limited edition cover

Professional ratings
Review scores
Source	Rating
Okayplayer	link

Black Orpheus is an album by Nigerian musician Keziah Jones.

== Track listings ==
1. "AfrosurrealismForTheLadies"
2. "Kpafuca"
3. "Femiliarise"
4. "Wet Questions"
5. "Neptune"
6. "72 Kilos"
7. "All Praises"
8. "Beautiful Emilie"
9. "Sadness Is"
10. "Autumn Moon"
11. "The Black Orpheus"
12. "Orin O' Lomi"

=== Limited edition ===
CD1

1. "AfrosurrealismForTheLadies"
2. "Kpafuca"
3. "Femiliarise"
4. "Wet Questions"
5. "Neptune"
6. "72 Kilos"
7. "All Praises"
8. "Beautiful Emilie"
9. "Sadness Is"
10. "Autumn Moon"
11. "The Black Orpheus"
12. "Orin O' Lomi"

CD2

1. "Cutest Lips" (acoustic)
2. "Guitar in the River"
3. "All Along the Watchtower" (acoustic)
4. "Beautiful Emilie" (acoustic)
5. "Neurotica"
6. "Rhythm Is Love" (acoustic)
7. "Million Miles from Home" (acoustic)
8. "When Somebody Loves You" (acoustic)
9. "So Much Trouble in the World"

== Charts ==
Chart (2003)	Peak position
France (SNEP)	13
