= D'Angelo discography =

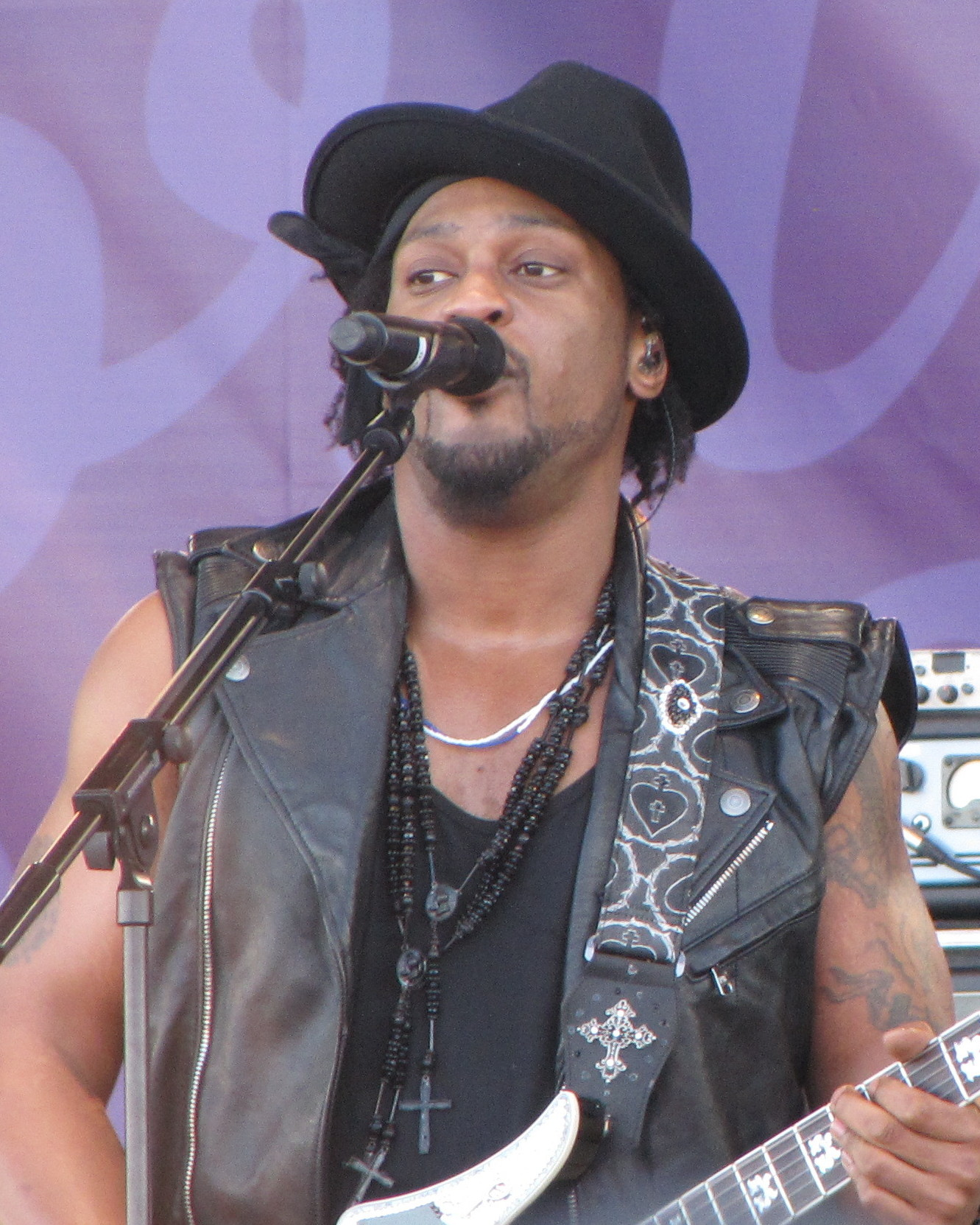
- Studio albums: 3
- Extended plays: 1
- Live albums: 2
- Compilation albums: 2
- Singles: 20
- Other songs: 34

This discography of D'Angelo documents the release of studio albums, live recordings, compilation albums, and other songs.

== Albums ==
=== Studio albums ===
List of studio albums, with selected chart positions and certifications
Title	Album details	Peak chart positions										Certifications
Title	Album details	US	US R&B /HH	CAN	FRA	NLD	NOR	NZ	SWE	SWI	UK	Certifications
Brown Sugar	Released: July 3, 1995; Re-issued: August 25, 2017; Label: EMI; Formats: CD, cassette, vinyl, digital download	22	4	—	—	66	—	47	—	—	57	RIAA: Platinum; BPI: Gold; MC: Gold
Voodoo	Released: January 25, 2000; Label: Virgin; Formats: CD, cassette, vinyl, digital download	1	1	7	57	28	9	10	13	42	21	RIAA: Platinum; BPI: Gold; MC: Gold
Black Messiah (credited to D'Angelo and the Vanguard)	Released: December 15, 2014; Label: RCA; Formats: CD, vinyl, digital download	5	3	17	168	14	10	30	35	25	47	
"—" denotes a recording that did not chart or was not released in that territory.

=== Compilation albums ===
List of compilation albums, with selected chart positions
Title	Album details	Peak chart positions
Title	Album details	US R&B /HH
The Best So Far...	Released: June 24, 2008; Label: Virgin; Formats: CD, digital download	70
Icon	Released: May 14, 2013; Label: Virgin, Universal Music; Formats: CD	74

=== Live albums ===
List of live albums, with selected chart positions
Title	Album details	Peak chart positions
Title	Album details	US R&B /HH
Live at the Jazz Cafe	Recorded: September 14, 1995 in Jazz Cafe, London; Released: June 30, 1998; Re-issued: March 25, 2014; Label: EMI, Universal Music; Formats: CD, cassette, digital download	49
Spotify Sessions	Recorded: 2015 in New York City; Released: 2015; Label: Spotify; Formats: streaming	—
Verzuz: D'Angelo x Friends	Released: February 27, 2021; Formats: streaming	—
"—" denotes a recording that did not chart or was not released in that territory.

== Extended plays ==
List of extended plays
Title	EP details
Voodoo DJ Soul Essentials	Released: 2000; Label: Virgin; Formats: 12" vinyl

== Singles ==
=== As lead artist ===
List of singles as lead artist, with selected chart positions and certifications, showing year released and album name
Title	Year	Peak chart positions						Certifications	Album
Title	Year	US	US R&B /HH	NLD	NZ	UK	UK R&B	Certifications	Album
"U Will Know" (as a part of Black Men United)	1994	28	5	—	—	—	—		Jason's Lyric OST
"Brown Sugar"	1995	27	5	31	—	24	5	RMNZ: Gold	Brown Sugar
"Cruisin'"	1995	53	10	—	27	31	6		Brown Sugar
"Lady"	1996	10	2	—	15	21	3	RIAA: Gold; RMNZ: Gold	Brown Sugar
"Me and Those Dreamin' Eyes of Mine"	1996	74	25	—	—	—	—		Brown Sugar
"Your Precious Love" (with Erykah Badu)	1996	—	83	—	—	—	—		High School High OST
"I Found My Smile Again"^{3}	1996	—	— (Note: "I Found My Smile Again" did not enter the Billboard Hot 100, but peaked at number six on the Bubbling Under Hot R&B/Hip-Hop Songs chart.)	—	—	—	—		Space Jam OST
"She's Always in My Hair"	1997	—	—	—	—	—	—		Scream 2 OST
"Devil's Pie"^{1}	1998	—	69	—	—	—	—		Belly OST / Voodoo
"Heaven Must Be Like This"	1999	—	74	—	—	—	—		Down in the Delta OST / Live at the Jazz Cafe
"Left & Right" (featuring Method Man and Redman)	1999	75	18	—	—	—	39		Voodoo
"Untitled (How Does It Feel)"	2000	25	2	78	—	—	—	RMNZ: Gold	Voodoo
"Send It On"	2000	— (Note: "Send It On" did not enter the Billboard Hot 100, but peaked at number 20 on the Bubbling Under Hot 100 chart.)	33	—	—	—	—		Voodoo
"Feel Like Makin' Love"	2000	—	— (Note: "Feel Like Makin' Love" did not enter the Billboard Hot 100, but peaked at number nine on the Bubbling Under R&B/Hip-Hop Songs chart.)	—	—	—	—		Voodoo
"Really Love"	2014	—	43	—	—	—	—		Black Messiah
"Betray My Heart"	2015	—	—	—	—	—	—		Black Messiah
"Unshaken"	2018	—	—	—	—	—	—		The Music of Red Dead Redemption 2: OST
"I Want You Forever" (with Jay-Z and Jeymes Samuel)	2024	—	—	—	—	—	—		The Book of Clarence OST

- ^{1} Only peaked on the US Billboard R&B/Hip-Hop Airplay Tracks chart.

=== As featured artist ===
List of singles as a featured artist, with selected chart positions, showing year released and album name
Title	Year	Peak chart positions				Album
Title	Year	US	US R&B /HH	UK	UK R&B	Album
"Cold World" (Remix) (GZA featuring Inspectah Deck and D'Angelo)	1996	—	—	40	7	Non-album single
"Break Ups 2 Make Ups" (Method Man featuring D'Angelo)	1998	98	29	33	3	Tical 2000: Judgement Day
"Be Here" (Raphael Saadiq featuring D'Angelo)	2002	99	61	—	—	Instant Vintage
"Imagine" (Snoop Dogg featuring Dr. Dre and D'Angelo)	2006	—	— (Note: "Imagine" did not enter the Billboard Hot 100, but peaked at number seven on the Bubbling Under Hot R&B/Hip-Hop Songs chart.)	—	—	Blue Carpet Treatment
"So Far to Go" (Common featuring D'Angelo)	2006	—	—	—	—	The Shining / Finding Forever
"Ibtihaj" (Rapsody featuring D'Angelo and GZA)	2019	—	—	—	—	Eve

== Other charted songs ==
List of other charted songs, with selected chart positions, showing year released and album name
Title	Year	Peak chart positions				Album
Title	Year	US	US R&B /HH	JPN	MEX	Album
"Nothing Even Matters" (Lauryn Hill featuring D'Angelo)	1999	— (Note: "Nothing Even Matters" did not enter the Billboard Hot 100, but peaked at number five on the Bubbling Under Hot 100 chart.)	25	—	—	The Miseducation of Lauryn Hill
"Sugah Daddy" (D'Angelo and the Vanguard)	2014	—	—	99	34	Black Messiah

== Other contributions ==
This list excludes recordings which only include samples of D'Angelo recordings.

- "Pray" on Vertical Hold's Head First album (1994)
- "Baby (Uptown Mix)" _{(producer)} on Brandy's "Baby" B-Side (1995)
- "You Used to Love Me" _{(keyboards)} on Faith Evan's "You Used 2 Love Me" B-Side (1995)
- "Crew" _{(keyboards)} on A Tribe Called Quest's Beats, Rhymes and Life album (1996)
- "Twice" _{(producer)} on Twice's "Sparkle" B-Side (1996)
- "Overjoyed" on Boys Choir of Harlem's Up in Harlem album (1996)
- "Girl You Need a Change of Mind" on Get on the Bus OST (1996)
- "The Hypnotic" collaboration on The Roots's Illadelph Halflife album (1996)
- "The 'Notic" collaboration with The Roots on Men in Black OST (1997)
- "Ain't Nobody Home" collaboration on B. B. King's Deuces Wild album (1997)
- "Nothing Even Matters" collaboration on Lauryn Hill's The Miseducation of Lauryn Hill album (1998)
- "The Spark" _{(keyboards)} on The Roots' Things Fall Apart album (1999)
- "Everyday" _{(writer)} on Angie Stone's Black Diamond album (1999)
- "Time Travelin'", "Time Travelin' (Reprise)" _{(co-producer)}; "Geto Heaven Part Two" collaboration on Common's Like Water for Chocolate album (2000)
- "Everybody Loves the Sunshine" on D'Angelo's "Untitled (How Does It Feel?)" B-Side (2000)
- "Tell Me" collaboration on Slum Village's Fantastic, Vol. 2 album (2000)
- "Caravan" collaboration with The Roots on the Red Hot + Indigo Duke Ellington tribute / charity fund-raising album (2000)
- "Talk Shit 2 Ya" on Baby Boy OST (2001)
- "Water No Got Enemy" collaboration on Red Hot + Riot: The Music and Spirit of Fela Kuti tribute / charity fund-raising album (2002)
- "I'll Stay" collaboration on Roy Hargrove's The RH Factor: Hard Groove album (2003)
- "Be Here" live collaboration on Raphael Saadiq's All Hits at the House of Blues album (2005)
- "Sing a Simple Song" virtual collaboration with Sly and The Family Stone featuring Isaac Hayes and Chuck D on Different Strokes by Different Folks tribute album (2006)
- "Bullshit" collaboration on Roy Hargrove's The RH Factor: Distractions album (2006)
- "Believe" collaboration on Q-Tip's The Renaissance album (2008)
- "Natural" _{(rhodes keyboards)} on Don-E's Natural album (2008)
- "Glass Mountain Trust" collaboration on Mark Ronson & The Business Intl's "Record Collection" album (2010)
