= The Voodoo World Tour =

2000 concert tour by D'Angelo

- Tour by D'Angelo
- Associated album: Voodoo
- Start date: March 1, 2000
- End date: October 20, 2000
- Legs: 4
- No. of shows: 68 in United States; 1 in Canada; 1 in South America; 7 in Europe; 77 total

D'Angelo concert chronology
- Brown Sugar Tour (1996); The Voodoo World Tour (2000); Occupy Music Tour (2012)

The Voodoo World Tour was a concert tour by American R&B/neo soul singer D'Angelo in support of his Platinum selling album, Voodoo. The tour started March 1, with the first of five nights in Los Angeles, CA at the House of Blues. The singer's itinerary included two North American legs, as well as dates throughout Europe and South America.

== Background ==
Following Voodoo's release, D'Angelo embarked on his second international tour in support of the album. The tour was sponsored by the clothing company Levi Strauss & Co., and it featured D'Angelo promoting an end to gun violence. After signing an initiative on June 7, 2000, at Hamilton High School in West Los Angeles to collect a million signatures by November 7 in support of "common-sense solutions" to end gun violence, the anti-gun violence organization PAX agreed to sponsor the tour. The tour was also set to feature a wall composed of denim by Levi's, made available for fans to sign in support of anti-gun violence. Consisting of a group assembled and directed by Questlove, the Soultronics, composed mostly of session personnel, the tour became one of the most attended shows of the year. According to a July 2000 issue of Jet magazine, the tour's first half "sold out in every city." It began on March 1, 2000, at the House of Blues in Los Angeles, The tour lasted nearly eight months, while performances went for up to three hours a night. "The Voodoo Tour" was taken internationally to venues including Paris Olympia, Trump Taj Mahal, Brixton Academy, the Montreux Jazz Festival, the North Sea Jazz Festival and the Free Jazz Festival in Brazil. Tour manager Alan Leeds, who previously headed James Brown's late 1960s and early 1970s outings, as well as Prince's Purple Rain tour in the mid-1980s, cited "The Voodoo Tour" as his most memorable gig. J Dilla's group Slum Village opened on several dates, while R&B singer Anthony Hamilton sang backup within the Soultronics on occasion.

== The show ==
In contrast to D'Angelo's supporting tour for Brown Sugar, which presented him performing behind his keyboard on stage, he exhibited a different style of showmanship and energy. Rolling Stone magazine called him "confident and worldly" in his performance, while also stating "No wonder he's alive onstage now, dancing, touching the audience, slamming his microphone down, lying on the ground at the lip of the stage to sing 'One Mo' Gin' while girls grab his legs, his stomach, his crotch." D'Angelo's wardrobe during the tour included tank tops, black leather pants, and boots. On one of the live outings, Rolling Stone described the appearance of the performers, stating "The Soultronics begin each show in all black, but beyond that one requirement, each looks completely distinct. One man is in a deacon's robe, another in a long cape with a knit ski cap that says FBI. There’s a feather boa, a few badass leather coats, and Questlove's mighty Afro. There's a P-Funkish freaky flair to the Soultronics' look."

In a review of D'Angelo's tour-opening performance at the House of Blues, The Hollywood Reporter's David Wollock described it as a "three-hour old-school soul marathon that was part 'Get Up (I Feel Like Being a) Sex Machine', part 'Let's Get It On', part 'Move on Up' gospel exuberance ... with call-and-response and other crowd-rousing church conventions". Wollock praised D'Angelo for his energy and display of showmanship, and wrote that "like the best hip-hop emcees who can rock a crowd with two turntables and a microphone, D moved the crowd with pure voice and charisma." A staff writer for the Chicago Defender lauded his performance at the Chicago Theatre, calling it "an explosive mixture of R&B, soul and funk."

With ticket prices ranging from $49 to $79, the tour became one of the most attended shows of 2000. The tour began on March 1, 2000, at the House of Blues in Los Angeles, while other venues included Paris Olympia, Trump Taj Mahal, Brixton Academy, the Montreux Jazz Festival, and the Essence Jazz Festival in New Orleans. By July, the tour's first half had sold out in each city. The tour lasted nearly eight months, while performances went for up to three hours a night. The Voodoo Tour was taken internationally, with one of the most notable performances being the Free Jazz Festival in Brazil.

== Critical reception ==
Performances earned rave reviews from critics and publications, who praised D'Angelo's energy and "charisma as a live performer", as well as the Soultronics group, and received comparisons to outings by the legendary funk bands Parliament and Sly & the Family Stone. Tanya Bell of The Gazette wrote that the group "displayed enormous talent as it took them two hours to play 11 songs." A staff writer for the Chicago Defender lauded his performance at the Chicago Theatre, calling it "an explosive mixture of R&B, soul and funk." Rolling Stone called him "abundantly gifted, eye-poppingly spectacular", "confident and worldly" in his performance at the House of Blues in Los Angeles. It compared the performance to his past concerts, stating "he's alive onstage now, dancing, touching the audience, slamming his microphone down, lying on the ground at the lip of the stage to sing 'One Mo' Gin' while girls grab his legs, his stomach, his crotch."

Totally committed, D'Angelo betrayed neither weakness nor ego—and gave so much Thursday that Friday he canceled with a sore throat I absolutely believe was the truth. He was R&B Jesus, and I'm a believer. Travel to another city to see him now.

— Robert Christgau, 2000

In a review of D'Angelo's tour-opening performance at the House of Blues, David Wollock of The Hollywood Reporter called it a "three-hour old-school soul marathon that was part 'Get Up (I Feel Like Being a) Sex Machine', part 'Let's Get It On', part 'Move on Up' gospel exuberance [...] with call-and-response and other crowd-rousing church conventions". He added that, "like the best hip-hop emcees who can rock a crowd with two turntables and a microphone, D moved the crowd with pure voice and charisma." Kaia Shivers of the Los Angeles Sentinel commented that his Los Angeles tour stop placed the city "under a spell that it seems hard pressed to shake."

Reviewing his March performance at New York City's Radio City Music Hall, rock critic Robert Christgau dubbed D'Angelo "R&B Jesus" and proclaimed himself a "believer". Christgau praised D'Angelo's delivery and compared the concert to a 1981 P-Funk outing at the Apollo Theater, stating "D'Angelo sang and danced and preached and flexed and crooned and humped the floor and covered Roberta Flack and snapped a mike stand in two and danced and sang and sang some more. Everything meshed; all stops were pulled out. It was already the greatest concert I'd seen in years when Redman and Method Man propelled the climactic 'Left and Right' through the vaulted ceiling. I flashed on P-Funk's 'Sadie', Apollo 1981. What a privilege to experience such a thing again." He also compared it to Marvin Gaye in concert, writing that "I saw Marvin Gaye at this venue shortly before he was murdered, and it was no contest. Gaye was fine, but self-indulgent and riddled with blank spots."

== Opening acts ==
- Slum Village (USA—Leg 1 & 2)
- Mos Def (USA—Leg 1)
- Lucy Pearl (USA—Leg 2 – select dates)
- Amel Larrieux (USA—Leg 2)

== Set list ==
1. "Voodoo" (intro)
2. "Devil's Pie"
3. "Send It On"
4. "Smooth"
5. "Chicken Grease"
6. "How Does it Feel?" (teaser)
7. "Get Up (I Feel Like Being a) Sex Machine"
8. "Me and Those Dreamin' Eyes of Mine"
9. "Sh*t, Damn, Motherf*cker"
10. "One Mo' Gin"
11. "The Root" (teaser)
12. "Feel Like Makin' Love"
13. "Left & Right"
14. "Left & Right (pt. 2)"
15. Interlude
16. "Brown Sugar"
17. "Jonz in my Bonz"
18. "Lady"
19. "Fall in Love"
20. "Untitled (How Does It Feel)"
21. "Funk Jam"

== Band ==
- The Soultronics

== Tour dates ==
Date	City	Country	Venue
North America
March 1, 2000	Los Angeles	United States	House of Blues
March 2, 2000	Los Angeles	United States	House of Blues
March 3, 2000	Los Angeles	United States	House of Blues
March 5, 2000	Los Angeles	United States	House of Blues
March 6, 2000	Los Angeles	United States	House of Blues
March 14, 2000	Atlanta	United States	Fox Theatre
March 16, 2000	New York City	United States	Radio City Music Hall
March 18, 2000	New York City	United States	Radio City Music Hall
March 20, 2000	New York City	United States	Radio City Music Hall (rescheduled from March 17)
March 21, 2000	Philadelphia	United States	Tower Theater
March 22, 2000	Philadelphia	United States	Tower Theater
March 24, 2000	Washington, D.C.	United States	DAR Constitution Hall
March 25, 2000	Washington, D.C.	United States	DAR Constitution Hall
March 26, 2000	Boston	United States	Wang Center (rescheduled from March 20)
March 28, 2000	Cleveland	United States	Palace Theatre
March 29, 2000	Toronto	Canada	Massey Hall
March 31, 2000	Chicago	United States	Arie Crown Theater
April 1, 2000	Chicago	United States	Arie Crown Theater
April 3, 2000	Denver	United States	Paramount Theatre
April 5, 2000	Oakland	United States	Paramount Theater
April 6, 2000	Oakland	United States	Paramount Theater
April 7, 2000	Los Angeles	United States	Gibson Amphitheatre
April 8, 2000	Los Angeles	United States	Gibson Amphitheatre
April 10, 2000	San Diego	United States	Open Air Theatre
April 11, 2000	Las Vegas	United States	The Joint
April 12, 2000	Phoenix	United States	Celebrity Theatre
April 14, 2000	Dallas	United States	Majestic Theatre
April 15, 2000	Houston	United States	Aerial Theater
April 16, 2000	Houston	United States	Aerial Theater
April 18, 2000	Nashville	United States	Tennessee Performing Arts Center
April 19, 2000	Kansas City	United States	Midland Theatre
April 20, 2000	St. Louis	United States	Fox Theater
April 22, 2000	Detroit	United States	Fox Theatre
April 23, 2000	Detroit	United States	Fox Theatre
April 25, 2000	Newark	United States	New Jersey Performing Arts Center
April 26, 2000	Washington, D.C.	United States	DAR Constitution Hall
April 28, 2000	Richmond	United States	Landmark Theater
April 29, 2000	Greensboro	United States	Special Events Center
April 30, 2000	Charlotte	United States	Ovens Auditorium
May 2, 2000	Miami	United States	James L. Knight Center
July 2, 2000	New Orleans	United States	Superdome
July 4, 2000	Milwaukee	United States	Marcus Amphitheater
Europe
July 7, 2000	Kristiansand	Norway	Quart Festival
July 8, 2000	Stockholm	Sweden	Cirkus
July 10, 2000	Hamburg	Germany	Gruenspan
July 12, 2000	Paris	France	Le Grand Rex
July 14, 2000	Montreux	Switzerland	Montreux Jazz Festival
July 15, 2000	Zeebrugge	Belgium	Axion Beach Rock
July 16, 2000	The Hague	Netherlands	North Sea Jazz Festival
July 19, 2000	London	England	Brixton Academy
North America
July 28, 2000	Cincinnati	United States	Coors Light Festival
July 29, 2000	Chicago	United States	Chicago Theatre
July 30, 2000	Kansas City	United States	Midland Theatre
August 1, 2000	Denver	United States	Paramount Theatre
August 3, 2000	Phoenix	United States	Celebrity Theatre
August 4, 2000	Las Vegas	United States	House of Blues
August 5, 2000	San Diego	United States	Open Air Theater
August 7, 2000	Los Angeles	United States	Greek Theatre
August 8, 2000	Los Angeles	United States	Universal Amphitheater
August 9, 2000	Concord	United States	Chronicle Pavilion
August 10, 2000	Sacramento	United States	Memorial Auditorium
August 12, 2000	Portland	United States	Arlene Schnitzer Concert Hall
August 13, 2000	Seattle	United States	The Pier
August 16, 2000	Minneapolis	United States	Orpheum Theatre
August 18, 2000	Indianapolis	United States	Murat Temple
August 19, 2000	Detroit	United States	Chene Park
August 20, 2000	Cleveland	United States	State Theater
August 22, 2000	Pittsburgh	United States	Iron City Light Amphitheater
August 23, 2000	Buffalo	United States	Shea's Performing Arts Center
August 24, 2000	Atlantic City	United States	Trump Taj Mahal
August 27, 2000	Wallingford	United States	Oakdale Theatre
August 28, 2000	Boston	United States	Fleet Boston Pavilion
August 29, 2000	Holmdel Township	United States	PNC Bank Arts Center
August 31, 2000	Baltimore	United States	Pier Six Concert Pavilion
September 2, 2000	Fort Pierce	United States	Sunrise Theatre
September 3, 2000	Orlando	United States	Bob Carr Performing Arts Centre
September 4, 2000	Atlanta	United States	Chastain Park
South America
October 20, 2000	São Paulo	Brazil	Free Jazz Festival
