= The Best So Far (D'Angelo album) =

The Best So Far...

Greatest hits album by D'Angelo
- Released: June 24, 2008
- Genre: R&B; neo soul; funk; soul
- Label: Virgin

D'Angelo chronology
| Voodoo DJ Soul Essentials (2000) | The Best So Far... (2008) | Black Messiah (2014) |

Professional ratings
Review scores
| Source | Rating |
|---|---|
| AllMusic | 3/5 stars |
| Blender | 3.5/5 stars |
| New York | favorable |
| New York Times | favorable |
| PopMatters | 8/10 |
| Q | 3/5 stars |
| Record Collector | 4/5 stars |

The Best So Far... is a compilation album by American musician D'Angelo, released on June 24, 2008, through Virgin Records. The compilation features songs from his two previous studio albums, Brown Sugar and Voodoo, as well as rarities and a second disc, a DVD of previously unreleased videos. Around the same time, the compilation was released digitally without the songs featuring Erykah Badu and Raphael Saadiq, under the title Ultimate D'Angelo.

== Track listing ==
=== CD ===
| No. | Title | Length |
|---|---|---|
| 1. | "Lady" (radio edit) | 4:06 |
| 2. | "Brown Sugar" (radio edit) | 4:03 |
| 3. | "Cruisin'" (radio edit) | 3:58 |
| 4. | "Me and Those Dreamin' Eyes of Mine" | 4:15 |
| 5. | "Smooth" | 4:19 |
| 6. | "I Found My Smile Again" (edit) | 4:00 |
| 7. | "Girl You Need a Change of Mind" | 4:08 |
| 8. | "She's Always in My Hair" (edit) | 4:06 |
| 9. | "Can't Hide Love" (live) | 3:56 |
| 10. | "Heaven Must Be Like This" | 4:12 |
| 11. | "Your Precious Love" (featuring Erykah Badu) | 4:31 |
| 12. | "Devil's Pie (A Cappella Interlude)" | 1:39 |
| 13. | "Left and Right" (clean radio edit) | 4:35 |
| 14. | "Untitled (How Does It Feel)" (radio edit) | 4:19 |
| 15. | "Send It On" | 5:55 |
| 16. | "Feel Like Makin' Love" | 6:02 |
| 17. | "Be Here" (featuring Raphael Saadiq) | 3:34 |

=== DVD ===
1. "Lady" (video)
2. "Brown Sugar" (video)
3. "Cruisin'" (video)
4. "Me and Those Dreamin' Eyes" (video)
5. "Left & Right" (video)
6. "Untitled (How Does It Feel)" (Video)
7. "Send It On" (video)

== Personnel ==
- Evren Göknar – Mastering Engineer
