= Judgement Day (Method Man song) =

Song by Method Man

Single by Method Man

from the album Tical 2000: Judgement Day
- B-side: "Dangerous Grounds"; "Big Dogs"
- Released: October 20, 1998
- Recorded: 1998
- Genre: East Coast hip hop, hardcore hip hop
- Length: 6:00 (album version) 4:23 (video version)
- Label: Def Jam
- Songwriters: Clifford Smith, Selwin Bougard
- Producers: Method Man, 4th Disciple (co.)

Method Man singles chronology
"4, 3, 2, 1" (1997)	"Judgement Day" (1998)	"Grand Finale" (1998)

"Judgement Day" is a song by American hip hop recording artist Method Man, released October 20, 1998 as the first single and twenty-seventh track from his second studio album, Tical 2000: Judgement Day (1998). It is the last full song on the album. The introduction of the track is based on the opening of the 1989 film Cyborg.

== Music video ==
A music video also has been made for the song which is inspired by his album cover, Tical 2000: Judgement Day.
