= The Soultronics =

R&B and neo soul supergroup

- Also known as: D'Angelo & The Soultronics
- Origin: United States
- Genres: Funk, neo soul, R&B, soul
- Occupations: Supergroup, backing band
- Years active: 2000, 2002
- Label: Virgin
- Past members: D’Angelo (deceased); James Poyser; Pino Palladino; Questlove; Russell Gunn; Frank Lacy; Anthony Hamilton; Roy Hargrove (deceased); Chalmers Alford (deceased); Shelby Johnson; F. Knuckles; Jack "JK" King III; Jacques Schwarz-Bart

The Soultronics was an R&B and neo soul supergroup formed in 2000, which served as the backing band for musician D'Angelo in 2000 during The Voodoo Tour, the supporting tour for his second studio album Voodoo. Several members of the group, including drummer Questlove of hip hop group The Roots, keyboardist James Poyser, trumpeter Roy Hargrove, and Welsh bassist Pino Palladino, had previously contributed to D'Angelo's Voodoo and are also associated with the Soulquarians musical collective. Along with performing during the tour, The Soultronics contributed to Red Hot + Riot: The Music and Spirit of Fela Kuti (2002), a charity release inspired by the music of Afrobeat artist Fela Kuti.

== Background ==
On January 25, 2000, D'Angelo released his second studio album, Voodoo (2000). After releasing several singles, he and his label, Virgin Records, decided to go on a several month worldwide tour, The Voodoo Tour. D'Angelo decided to surround himself with a group for the duration of the tour, composed with artists close or not so close surrounding. Because of its composition, The Soultronics is considered a supergroup, composed of artists who are themselves already part of a group, or from different musical origins. The large-scale group consisted of up to thirteen members.

Although created for D'Angelo's tour, the group was actually created by three other artists and close friends of D'Angelo's: Ahmir "Questlove" Thompson of The Roots, James Poyser and Pino Palladino, all of whom contributed to Voodoo. Questlove and Poyser, along with D'Angelo, are members of the neo soul collective Soulquarians and although Palladino was never officially part of the group, he was a very active collaborator, and worked on many of these artists' albums. During the tour, J Dilla and his group Slum Village opened on several dates, while R&B singer Anthony Hamilton sang backup within the Soultronics on occasion. Hamilton was joined as a backup singer by Shelby Johnson and Jack "JK" King III.

== Tour and aftermath ==
The performances during The Voodoo Tour earned rave reviews from several music critics and publications, receiving praise for D'Angelo's energy and "charisma as a live performer" and the Soultronics group, while earning comparisons to outings by the legendary funk bands Parliament and Sly & the Family Stone. On one of the live outings, Rolling Stone's Touré described the appearance of the performers, stating "The Soultronics begin each show in all black, but beyond that one requirement, each looks completely distinct. One man is in a deacon's robe, another in a long cape with a knit ski cap that says FBI. There’s a feather boa, a few badass leather coats, and Questlove's mighty Afro. There's a P-Funkish freaky flair to the Soultronics' look."

The group was broken up at the end of the tour; the tour started in early 2000 and ended at the beginning of late 2000 when D'Angelo's issues towards performing worsened. A live album and a Soultronics studio effort were set for after the tour, the latter of which Questlove had stated that "[It will be] funk with a feeling. This was a very, very hot band, and we feel like it has a lot more potential than what we got to do during [D'Angelo's] tour." However, hopes for both releases waned as D'Angelo's problems with alcoholism escalated, and impatient Virgin executives cut off funding for his expected third album in 2004. D'Angelo's death at 51, from pancreatic cancer, was announced by his family on October 14th, 2025.

== Band members ==
Although some artists only participated sporadically during the tour, its members included:

- D'Angelo
- Pino Palladino
- Chalmers "Spanky" Alford
- Questlove
- Jacques Schwarz-Bart
- James Poyser
- Anthony Hamilton
- Russell Gunn
- Shelby Johnson
- Frank Lacy
- Jack "JK" King III
- Jef Lee Johnson
