= Tical 2000: Judgement Day =

Studio album by Method Man
- Released: November 17, 1998
- Recorded: October 1997 – August 1998
- Genre: Hip-hop
- Length: 73:21
- Labels: Def Jam; PolyGram
- Producers: RZA; Method Man; True Master; Inspectah Deck; 4th Disciple; Erick Sermon; Havoc; Mathematics; LB da Life Bringa; Qu'ran Goodman

Method Man chronology
Tical (1994)	Tical 2000: Judgement Day (1998)	Blackout! (1999)

Wu-Tang Clan solo chronology
The Pillage (1998)	Tical 2000: Judgement Day (1998)	Bobby Digital in Stereo (1998)

Singles from Tical 2000: Judgement Day
- 1. "Judgement Day" Released: October 20, 1998; 2. "Break Ups 2 Make Ups" Released: January 26, 1999

Professional ratings
Review scores
Source	Rating
AllMusic	2.5/5 stars
Entertainment Weekly	A−
Los Angeles Times	3.5/4 stars
NME	6/10
Rolling Stone	4/5 stars
The Rolling Stone Album Guide	2.5/5 stars
Spin	8/10
USA Today	3.5/4 stars

Tical 2000: Judgement Day is the second studio album by American rapper and Wu-Tang Clan member Method Man. It was released on November 17, 1998, by Def Jam Recordings. The album's title and overall theme were heavily influenced by the apocalypse theories surrounding the forthcoming end of the second millennium. It was produced by RZA, True Master, Inspectah Deck, 4th Disciple, Erick Sermon, Havoc, and Trackmasters, among others. The album features guest appearances from Redman, Lisa "Left Eye" Lopes, Mobb Deep, D'Angelo, Streetlife (who appears on seven of the album's twenty-eight tracks), and others.

== Commercial performance ==
Tical 2000: Judgement Day debuted at number two on the US Billboard 200 and number one on the US Top R&B/Hip-Hop Albums charts, selling 411,000 copies in its first week. Upon its release, the album received mostly favorable reviews from music critics, though several disapproved of its over-abundance of skits. As of December 16, 1998, the album was certified platinum by the Recording Industry Association of America (RIAA) for sales of over one million copies in the United States. As of October 2009, the album has 1,605,000 copies in the United States.

== Track listing ==
Tical 2000: Judgement Day track listing
No.	Title	Writer(s)	Producer(s)	Length
1.	"Judgement Day (Intro)"	Clifford Smith, Jr.	Method Man	0:52
2.	"Perfect World"	Smith, Jr.; Robert Fitzgerald Diggs	RZA	3:00
3.	"Cradle Rock" (featuring Left Eye and Booster)	Smith, Jr.; Lisa Lopes	LB Da Life Bringa	4:13
4.	"Dangerous Grounds" (featuring Streetlife)	Smith, Jr.; Patrick Charles; Derrick Harris	True Master	4:07
5.	"Sweet Love (Skit)"	Smith, Jr.		0:06
6.	"Sweet Love" (featuring Cappadonna and Streetlife)	Smith, Jr.; Darryl Hill; Charles; Harris	True Master	3:29
7.	"Shaolin What (Skit)"	Smith, Jr.; El-Divine Amir Bey	4th Disciple	2:19
8.	"Torture"	Smith, Jr.; Harris	True Master	3:23
9.	"Where's Method Man? (Skit)" (featuring Ed Lover)	Smith, Jr.; James Roberts		1:04
10.	"Suspect Chin Music" (featuring Streetlife)	Smith, Jr.; Charles; Diggs	RZA	4:52
11.	"Retro Godfather"	Smith, Jr.; Diggs; Mike Cleveland; Ron Dean Miller; Vincent Montana, Jr.; Bert Reid	RZA	2:50
12.	"Dooney Boy (Skit)"	Smith, Jr.		0:15
13.	"Spazzola" (featuring Inspectah Deck, Killa Sin, Masta Killa, Raekwon, and Streetlife)	Smith, Jr.; Jason Richard Hunter; Jeryl Grant; Jamel Irief; Corey Woods; Charles	Inspectah Deck	3:54
14.	"Check Writer (Skit)"	Smith, Jr.; Lyor Cohen		0:13
15.	"You Play Too Much (Skit)" (featuring Chris Rock)	Christopher Julius Rock	Prince Paul	1:31
16.	"Party Crasher"	Smith, Jr.; Harris	True Master; RZA	3:53
17.	"Grid Iron Rap" (featuring Streetlife)	Smith, Jr.; Harris; Charles	True Master	3:23
18.	"Step By Step"	Smith, Jr.; Erick Sermon; Tupac Amaru Shakur; Gregory Edward Jacobs; Ronald Brooks; Roger Troutman; Larry Troutman; Shirley Murdock	Erick Sermon	3:34
19.	"Play IV Keeps" (featuring Street Life, Inspectah Deck, and Mobb Deep)	Smith, Jr.; Hunter; Charles; Albert Johnson; Kejuan Waliek Muchita	Havoc	3:33
20.	"Donald Trump (Skit)"	Donald John Trump		0:11
21.	"Snuffed Out (Skit)" (featuring Streetlife)	Charles	Mathematics	1:39
22.	"Elements" (featuring Polite and Star)	Smith, Jr.; Hunter	Inspectah Deck	3:58
23.	"Killin' Fields" (featuring Cho-Flo)	Smith, Jr.; Harris	True Master	4:03
24.	"Big Dogs" (featuring Redman)	Smith, Jr.; Reginald Noble; Sermon; Keith Omar Murray; Rosalyn Noble; Rod Kirkpatrick	Erick Sermon	3:29
25.	"Break Ups 2 Make Ups" (featuring D'Angelo)	Smith, Jr.; Michael Eugene Archer; Jean-Claude Olivier; Samuel Barnes	Qu'ran Goodman; Trackmasters	3:53
26.	"Message from Penny (Skit)" (featuring Janet Jackson)	Smith, Jr.; Janet Damita Jo Jackson		0:28
27.	"Judgement Day"	Smith, Jr.; Bey	Method Man; 4th Disciple	6:00
28.	"C.E.O. Outro"	Russell Wendell Simmons		0:04
Total length:				73:21

== Personnel ==
- Method Man - performer, producer, executive producer
- RZA - producer, performer, executive producer, engineer
- Streetlife - performer
- Left Eye - performer
- Cappadonna - performer
- Inspectah Deck - producer, performer
- 4th Disciple - producer
- Prince Paul - producer
- Havoc - producer
- Qur'an Goodman, Trackmasters - producer
- Erick Sermon - producer
- Allah Mathematics - producer
- Divine - executive producer
- Kevin Liles - executive producer
- Jeff Trotter - A&R executive, mastering
- Donald Trump - performer

== Charts ==
=== Weekly charts ===
Chart (1998)	Peak position
Australian Albums (ARIA)	46
Canadian Albums (Billboard)	5
Canadian R&B Albums (SoundScan)	1
Dutch Albums (Album Top 100)	40
French Albums (SNEP)	15
German Albums (Offizielle Top 100)	32
Swedish Albums (Sverigetopplistan)	54
UK Albums (Official Charts)	49
US Billboard 200	2
US Top R&B/Hip-Hop Albums (Billboard)	1

=== Year-end charts ===
Chart (1999)	Position
US Billboard 200	57
US Top R&B/Hip-Hop Albums (Billboard)	15

== Certifications ==
Region	Certification	Certified units/sales
Canada (Music Canada)	Platinum	100,000^{^}
United Kingdom (BPI)	Silver	60,000^{*}
United States (RIAA)	Platinum	1,000,000^{^}
^{*} Sales figures based on certification alone.^{^} Shipments figures based on certification alone.
