= The Root =

Song by D'Angelo

from the album Voodoo
- Released: January 25, 2000
- Recorded: 1998–99 at Electric Lady Studios in New York
- Genre: Neo soul; funk; soul
- Length: 6:33
- Label: Virgin
- Composers: Charlie Hunter; D'Angelo; Luther Archer
- Producer: D'Angelo

"The Root" is a song by American recording artist D'Angelo. It is the eighth track on his second studio album, Voodoo, which was released on January 25, 2000, by Virgin Records. "The Root" was recorded and produced by D'Angelo at New York's Electric Lady Studios during sessions for the album.

The song was composed by guitarist Charlie Hunter, D'Angelo, and Luther Archer, D'Angelo's brother. "The Root" features intricate musical arrangements and its theme concerns a vengeful lover's effect on the song's narrator whose lament is depicted in the lyrics. It was well received by music critics, who commended its music and lyrical content.

== Recording and production ==
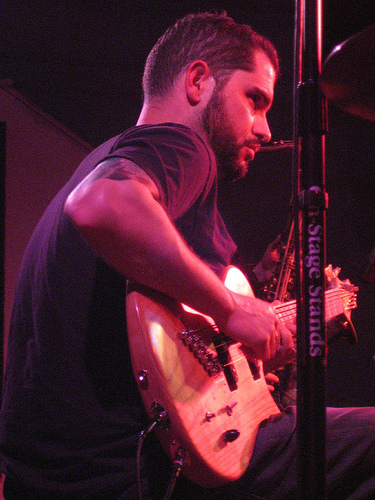
Charlie Hunter plays the song's bass and guitar parts.

"The Root" was recorded and produced by D'Angelo at Electric Lady Studios in New York City during sessions for his sophomore funk studio album, Voodoo (2000), which took place during 1998 to 1999. The song was composed by guitarist Charlie Hunter, D'Angelo, and Luther Archer, D'Angelo's brother. According to Voodoo's co-producer and drummer, Ahmir "Questlove" Thompson of The Roots, the track serves as part of the album's "virtuoso part", along with "Spanish Joint" and "Greatdayndamornin' / Booty". It features intricate technical arrangements and no overdubbing of live instrumentation or vocals.

Charlie Hunter simultaneously plays a bass line and guitar solo for the song. Hunter came up with the song's guitar and bass parts after being inspired by his jamming with D'Angelo to Jimi Hendrix songs. He played the guitar and bass sections on "The Root" with a custom 8 string guitar/bass combo, which features the upper three strings as bass and the lower five as guitar. It also had separate pickups for each set of strings, along with separate outputs for each pickup.

To adjust to his playing, Voodoo's audio engineer Russell Elevado had separate outputs from Hunter's guitar connected to a separate bass and guitar amplifier. Elevado has stated that "there was slight bleeding into each other from the pickups close to each other, but enough separation for me to manage a good sound on both". Hunter has stated that the session for the song was the most challenging session he has worked on.

== Composition ==
"The Root"
A 28-second sample of "The Root" featuring vocals by D'Angelo

Charlie Hunter composed the song in his hotel room on a hybrid guitar/bass. Later, D'Angelo composed the song's vocal and musical arrangement. A calm soul track, "The Root" is performed in mid-tempo and its groove-based sound is accompanied by Charlie Hunter's signature guitar riffs, which form the crux of the song's winding grooves. Hunter's fuzzy guitar lines have been compared to the musical structure of Jimi Hendrix's "Castles Made of Sand" (1967).

A mid-tempo heartbreak song, the lyrics of "The Root" have the narrator lamenting a lost lover; "In the name of love and war, she took my shield and sword ... From the pit of the bottom that knows no floor/Like the rain to the dirt, from the vine to the wine/From the alpha of creation, to the end of all time". The final two minutes of "The Root" feature an emphatic refrain of the chorus line. Reveille Magazine's Steve McPherson wrote that the chorus "feeds back into itself over and over again, turning from a hook into a mantra into a gospel affirmation". In the promotional EPK for Voodoo, D'Angelo discussed the therapeutic nature of recording "The Root", stating "It was kinda therapeutic for me to do this song. It kinda help me get over, because I'm so pathetic in the song. You know what I mean? That's what 'The Root' is. She got it on me. And I'm just fucked up. It was good for me to get over that. It was hard for me sometimes to do that song. To record it, because when doing it I would have to put myself in that mode you know".

== Reception ==
Music critic Neil Drumming of the Washington City Paper called "The Root" catchy and sexy. The Cavalier Daily writer John Bylander stated that the song has "an amazing baseline and chorus". One writer interpreted the song's theme as "some vengeful woman done worked a root on him". NME compared the lyrics, in particular the line "My blood is cold/And I can't feel my legs", to the "weird possession stuff" of the album's voodoo concept. Music writer Stephanie Zacharek of Salon stated that D'Angelo "takes pleasure in his very powerlessness in the face of womankind" on the song. The Village Voice writer Miles Marshall Lewis commended Charlie Hunter for his guitar work and D'Angelo for his lyrical substance on the song, writing that its lyrical narrative "can actually be digested and emotionally felt, sadly rare for Hot 97 R&B". Spin magazine's David Peisner wrote that the song suggests "a guy who's seen love's nasty side". The GW Hatchet called it "inspiring", The Austin Chronicle described it as "slow and measured", and Exclaim! cited "The Root" as one of Voodoo's "finest moments", and noted the song's "exquisite resignation".

== Credits and personnel ==
Credits adapted from album booklet liner notes.

- Produced by D'Angelo
- All vocals performed by D'Angelo
- Vocal and musical arrangements by D'Angelo
- Bass and guitar: Charlie Hunter
- All other instruments: D'Angelo

== Bibliography ==
- Saul Williams, D'Angelo (2000). Voodoo. (CD liner notes). Virgin Records America, Inc., 338 N. Foothill Road, Beverly Hills, CA 90210.
