= Voodoo DJ Soul Essentials =

EP by D'Angelo
- Released: 2000
- Recorded: 1998–1999
- Studio: Electric Lady Studios (New York, New York)
- Genre: R&B, neo soul
- Length: 33:12
- Label: Virgin
- Producer: D'Angelo, Questlove, Russell Elevado, DJ Premier, Raphael Saadiq, J Dilla

D'Angelo chronology
Voodoo (2000)	Voodoo DJ Soul Essentials (2000)	The Best So Far… (2008)

Voodoo DJ Soul Essentials is an EP by American musician D'Angelo, released in 2000 on Virgin Records. As part of the promotional efforts by the Cheeba Sound label and Virgin Records America for D'Angelo's second studio album Voodoo, the 12" vinyl EP was issued in order to attract DJs and airplay. Voodoo DJ Soul Essentials consists of three tracks taken from Voodoo: "Chicken Grease", "Feel Like Makin' Love", and "Spanish Joint". The original versions appear on the A-side, and instrumental versions are on the B-side. The cover art for the album was originally featured in the Voodoo album liner notes.

== Track listing ==
=== Side one ===
1. "Chicken Grease" – 4:38
2. "Feel Like Makin' Love" – 6:22
3. "Spanish Joint" – 5:44

=== Side two ===
1. "Chicken Grease" (Instrumental) – 4:35
2. "Feel Like Makin' Love" (Instrumental) – 6:09
3. "Spanish Joint" (Instrumental) – 5:44
