= Break Ups 2 Make Ups =

1998 song by Method Man featuring D'Angelo

Single by Method Man featuring D'Angelo

from the album Tical 2000: Judgement Day
- Released: January 26, 1999
- Recorded: 1998
- Genre: Hip-hop; R&B
- Length: 3:53
- Label: Def Jam; PolyGram
- Songwriters: Clifford Smith Jr.; Michael Eugene Archer; Jean-Claude Olivier; Samuel Barnes
- Producers: Qu'ran Goodman; Trackmasters

Method Man singles chronology
"Pussy Pop" (1998)	"Break Ups 2 Make Ups" (1999)	"Symphony 2000" (1999)

D'Angelo singles chronology
"Devil's Pie" (1998)	"Break Ups 2 Make Ups" (1999)	"Left & Right" (1999)

Music video
- "Break Ups 2 Make Ups" on YouTube

"Break Ups 2 Make Ups" is a song by American rapper Method Man and the second single from his second studio album Tical 2000: Judgement Day (1998). It features American singer D'Angelo and was produced by Qu'ran Goodman of Da Youngsta's and the Trackmasters.

== Background ==
While Method Man was likely working on fellow Wu-Tang Clan member Ghostface Killah's album Supreme Clientele, he ran into Tone of Trackmasters at New York City's Hit Factory Studios. Tone expressed interest in working with Method Man. According to Method Man, he had to track down Tone after their first meeting but eventually "Break Ups 2 Make Ups" was recorded. D'Angelo's vocals were later added. The song has been considered a sequel to Method Man's "I'll Be There for You/You're All I Need to Get By" featuring Mary J. Blige.

== Composition ==
The song contains acoustic guitar throughout the instrumental, while lyrically Method Man deals with the women that have brought trouble to his life. In the first verse, he addresses an ex-girlfriend who cheated on him and briefly reflects on the early times of their relationship before elaborating on the problems. The second and third verses are respectively about women jealous of his new girlfriend and a woman being with him to make her boyfriend jealous.

== Critical reception ==
The song received mixed-to-negative reviews from music critics. Jason Birchmeier of AllMusic regarded Tical 2000: Judgement Day as "unfortunately too often ill-conceived", citing "Break Ups 2 Make Ups" as an example and calling it "overly calculated". In a review of the album, S.H. Fernando Jr. stated "Only his collaboration with D'Angelo on the bland R&B; jam 'Break Ups 2 Make Ups,' fails to add any flavor." Jaffe Lloyd of HotNewHipHop included the song in his list "Best Hip-Hop Break Up Tracks".

== Charts ==
Chart (1999)	Peak position
US Billboard Hot 100	98
US Hot R&B/Hip-Hop Songs (Billboard)	29
US Hot Rap Songs (Billboard)	10
