= Left & Right (D'Angelo song) =

Single by D'Angelo featuring Method Man & Redman

from the album Voodoo
- Released: October 19, 1999
- Recorded: 1999
- Studio: Electric Lady (New York)
- Genre: Hip hop; neo soul; R&B
- Length: 4:46
- Label: Virgin
- Songwriters: Michael Eugene Archer; Clifford Smith; Reginald Noble; Jonathan Davis
- Producer: D'Angelo

D'Angelo singles chronology
"Break Ups 2 Make Ups" (1999)	"Left & Right" (1999)	"Untitled (How Does It Feel)" (2000)

Method Man & Redman singles chronology
"Tear It Off" (1999)	"Left & Right" (1999)	"Da Rockwilder" (1999)

Redman singles chronology
"Tear It Off" (1999)	"Left & Right" (1999)	"Da Rockwilder" (1999)

Method Man singles chronology
"Tear It Off" (1999)	"Left & Right" (1999)	"Da Rockwilder" (1999)

Music video
- "Left & Right" on YouTube

Audio sample
- file; help

"Left & Right" is a song by American soul musician D'Angelo featuring American rappers Method Man & Redman. It was released on October 19, 1999, by Virgin Records, as the lead single from the singer's second studio album Voodoo (2000). Recording sessions took place at Electric Lady Studios in New York City. Written by D'Angelo, Method Man, Redman and Q-Tip, it was produced by D'Angelo himself. An accompanying music video was directed by Malik Hassan Sayeed.

== Background ==
A part of the musical collective Soulquarians, producer J Dilla served as a frequent collaborator of theirs. Although album tracks such as "Left & Right" and "Devil's Pie" help to bring this claim to light, Dilla himself was not officially credited for production. However, he contributed significantly to Voodoo's overall sound, specifically the rhythm and percussion. Q-Tip was originally intended to contribute a verse to the song "Left & Right", but was replaced by rappers Method Man & Redman during recording due to creative differences. Questlove has stated that "general opinion was that the song was cool but nobody was feeling Tip's verse". According to former A&R representative Gary Harris, D'Angelo's manager Dominique Trenier "thought that Tip’s verse was wack".

== Track listing ==
12" maxi single
No.	Title	Writer(s)	Length
1.	"Left & Right" (Radio Edit)	Michael Eugene Archer; Clifford Smith; Reginald Noble; Jonathan Davis
2.	"Left & Right" (Explicit Edit)	Archer; Smith; Noble; Davis
3.	"Left & Right" (Instrumental)	Archer; Smith; Noble; Davis
4.	"Untitled (How Does It Feel)"	Archer; Charles Ray Wiggins
5.	"Left & Right" (Album Version)	Archer; Smith; Noble; Davis
6.	"Left & Right" (A Cappella)	Archer; Smith; Noble; Davis

CD single
No.	Title	Writer(s)	Length
1.	"Left & Right" (Radio Edit)	Archer; Smith; Noble; Davis
2.	"Left & Right" (W/o Rap Version)	Archer; Smith; Noble; Davis
3.	"Left & Right" (Explicit Version)	Archer; Smith; Noble; Davis
4.	"Devil's Pie"	Archer

== Personnel ==
- Michael Eugene "D'Angelo" Archer – songwriter, vocals, producer
- Clifford "Method Man" Smith – songwriter, rap vocals
- Reginald "Redman" Noble – songwriter, rap vocals
- Jonathan "Q-Tip" Davis – songwriter
- Russell Elevado – recording, mixing

== Charts ==
1999–2000 weekly chart performance for "Left & Right"
Chart	Peak position
UK Hip Hop/R&B (OCC)	39
US Billboard Hot 100	70
US Hot R&B/Hip-Hop Songs (Billboard)	18

== Release history ==
Release dates and formats for "Left & Right"
Region	Date	Format(s)	Label(s)	Ref.
United States	October 19, 1999	Rhythmic contemporary radio; urban contemporary radio	Virgin; Cheeba Sound	
United Kingdom	November 15, 1999	12-inch vinyl; maxi CD	EMI	
Japan	December 24, 1999	Maxi CD	Toshiba EMI	
