= Voodoo (D'Angelo album) =

Studio album by D'Angelo
- Released: January 25, 2000
- Recorded: 1998–1999
- Studio: Electric Lady (New York)
- Genres: Neo soul; R&B; funk; soul; jazz; psychedelic soul
- Length: 78:54
- Labels: Virgin; Cheeba Sound
- Producers: D'Angelo; DJ Premier; Raphael Saadiq

D'Angelo chronology
Live at the Jazz Cafe (1998)	Voodoo (2000)	Voodoo DJ Soul Essentials (2000)

Singles from Voodoo
- 1. "Devil's Pie" Released: October 31, 1998; 2. "Left & Right" Released: October 19, 1999; 3. "Untitled (How Does It Feel)" Released: January 1, 2000; 4. "Send It On" Released: March 25, 2000; 5. "Feel Like Makin' Love" Released: April 8, 2000

Voodoo is the second studio album by American musician D'Angelo, released on January 25, 2000, through Virgin Records. D'Angelo recorded the album during 1998 and 1999 at Electric Lady Studios in New York City, with an extensive line-up of musicians associated with the Soulquarians musical collective. Produced primarily by the singer, Voodoo features a loose, groove-based funk sound and serves as a departure from the more conventional song structure of his debut album, Brown Sugar (1995). Its lyrics explore themes of spirituality, love, sexuality, maturation, and fatherhood.

Following heavy promotion and public anticipation, the album was met with commercial and critical success. It debuted at number 1 on the US Billboard 200, selling 320,000 copies in its first week, and spent thirty-three weeks on the chart. It was promoted with five singles, including the hit single "Untitled (How Does It Feel)", whose music video garnered D'Angelo mainstream attention and controversy. Critically, Voodoo was acclaimed as a masterpiece and earned D'Angelo several accolades, including the Grammy Award for Best R&B Album and top rankings in album polls for the year.

D'Angelo promoted Voodoo with an international supporting tour in late 2000. While successful early on, the tour became plagued by concert cancellations and D'Angelo's personal frustrations surrounding his sexualized public image from the album's marketing. Voodoo has since been regarded by music writers as a creative milestone of the neo soul genre during its apex and has sold more than 1.7 million copies in the United States, being certified platinum by the Recording Industry Association of America (RIAA). Voodoo was listed as 28th on Rolling Stone's 500 Greatest Albums of All Time.

== Background ==
Following the success of his debut album Brown Sugar (1995), D'Angelo went into a four-and-a-half-year absence from the music scene and releasing solo work. His debut album presented a musical fusion of traditional soul and R&B influences with hip-hop vocal and production elements, serving as fundamental elements for the neo soul sound. With its single-oriented success, Brown Sugar earned considerable sales success and defied the contemporary, producer-driven sound of the time, while earning popularity among mature R&B audiences and the growing hip-hop generation. Prior to its release, neo soul itself was undefined by a major artist or musical work, and was developing during the early 1990s through the work of artists such as Tony! Toni! Toné!, Me'Shell NdegéOcello, and Omar. The album also earned D'Angelo recognition for producing a commercial breakthrough for the genre and giving notice to other neo soul artists, including Erykah Badu, Lauryn Hill, and Maxwell.

After spending two years on tour promoting Brown Sugar, D'Angelo found himself stuck with writer's block. On the setback, D'Angelo later stated "The thing about writer's block is that you want to write so fucking bad, [but] the songs don't come out that way. They come from life. So you've got to live to write." During this time, he generally released cover versions and remakes, including a cover-collaboration with Erykah Badu of the Marvin Gaye and Tammi Terrell duet song "Your Precious Love" for the soundtrack to High School High (1996). D'Angelo also covered Prince's "She's Always in My Hair" for the Scream 2 soundtrack (1997), as well as the Ohio Players' "Heaven Must Be Like This" for the Down in the Delta soundtrack (1998). He also appeared on a duet, "Nothing Even Matters", with Lauryn Hill for her debut solo album The Miseducation of Lauryn Hill (1998). He also spent the time lifting weights, smoking marijuana, and making music.

=== Inspiration ===
In 1998, he was inspired to write music again after the birth of his first child, Michael, with fellow R&B singer and then-girlfriend Angie Stone. He also traveled back to the South, spending time in South Carolina and in his hometown of Richmond, Virginia, while reconnecting himself with the African-American musical history that had originally inspired him. Shortly after his son's birth and the release of his first live album Live at the Jazz Cafe (1998) through EMI Records, he began preparation for the recording of songs for Voodoo. In several interviews after its release, he cited his son's birth as an inspirational source and creative muse for him. A dedication to his son Michael and daughter Imani was included in the album's liner notes, which were co-written by D'Angelo and writer/musician Saul Williams. In a press video accompanying the release of Voodoo, D'Angelo suggested that he was attempting to create a new sound for him that was in transition: "My inspiration was just to go farther. To get to that next level. To push it even further. To work against the floss and the grain and to get even deeper into the sound that I'm hearing ... and the thing is, I'm just looking at Voodoo as just the beginning. I'm still developing and growing and still listening to that sound I hear inside my head ... So this is the first step".

In a February 1999 interview with music journalist Touré, D'Angelo discussed the album and elaborated on the events that had preceded its release, explaining how he had no initial plan for a follow-up. He also discussed his attempt to focus on his original inspiration to produce music, stating "The sound and feel of my music are going to be affected by what motivates me to do it". On his visit to South Carolina, D'Angelo stated that he "went through this runnel, through gospel, blues, and a lot of old soul, old James Brown, early, early Sly and the Family Stone, and a lot of Jimi Hendrix", and "I learned a lot about music, myself, and where I want to go musically". In the same interview, he cited the deaths of rappers Tupac Shakur and The Notorious B.I.G. as having a great effect on him during the period. In another interview with Touré, D'Angelo said that he had lost his enthusiasm after Brown Sugar's reception and "was gettin' jaded, lookin' at what go on in the business". On his purpose for returning, D'Angelo stated "I had to reiterate why I was doin' that in the first place, and the reason was the love for the music". Dissatisfied with the direction of R&B and soul upon making the album, D'Angelo later explained to Jet that "the term R&B doesn't mean what it used to mean. R&B is pop, that's the new word for R&B." He also found contemporary R&B to be "a joke", adding that "the funny thing about it is that the people making this shit are dead serious about the stuff they're making. It's sad—they've turned black music into a club thing." In the liner notes for Voodoo, Saul Williams examined the album's concept and echoes D'Angelo's dissatisfaction with the mainstream direction of contemporary R&B/soul and hip-hop, noting a lack of artistic integrity in the two music genres. In an interview for Ebony, D'Angelo said of his role and influences for Voodoo:

I consider myself very respectful of the masters who came before. In some ways, I feel a responsibility to continue and take the cue from what they were doing musically and vibe on it. That's what I want to do. But I want to do it for this time and this generation.

== Recording and production ==
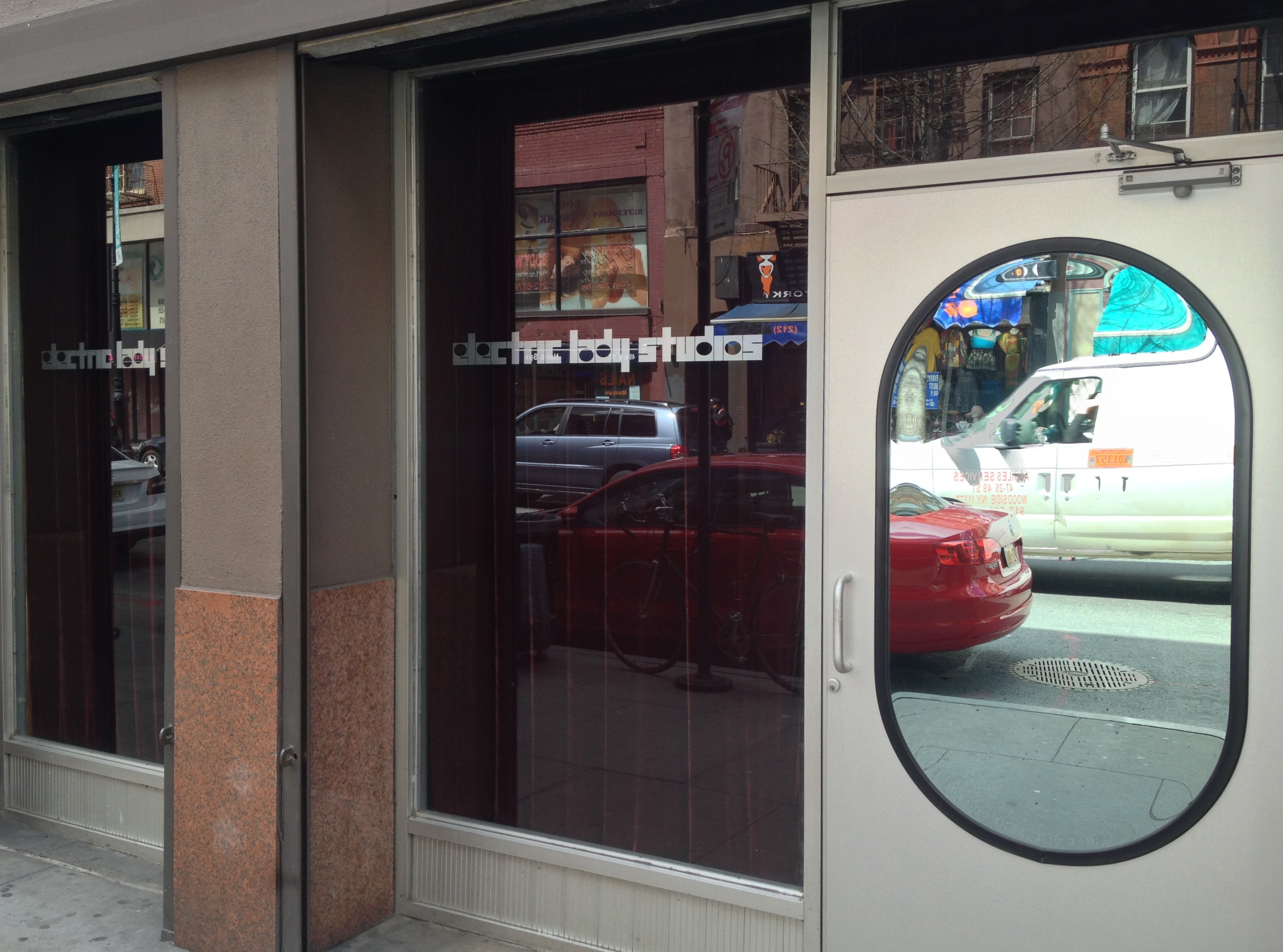
Electric Lady Studios (entrance pictured), where the album was recorded

Beginning in 1996, Voodoo evolved from nearly four years of sessions and featured an extensive roster of R&B, hip-hop, and jazz musicians and recording technicians. Drummer and producer Ahmir "Questlove" Thompson of the Roots was D'Angelo's "co-pilot" during the session. He and his crew studied bootleg videotapes of classic R&B artists such as Marvin Gaye, James Brown, and Jimi Hendrix, along with reruns of Soul Train, at Electric Lady Studios, the Manhattan-based recording studio built by Jimi Hendrix. After watching a tape, they played a certain artist's album or catalog, jam, and recorded for inspiration. Touré of Rolling Stone observed, "One night they played Prince's Parade until they flowed into a new groove that became 'Africa'". On several occasions, D'Angelo listened to Sly & the Family Stone's There's a Riot Goin' On (1971), which had an influential production. The crew recorded numerous hours of unreleased, original material, as well as covers of their influencers' material. Collectively referred to by D'Angelo as "yoda", these influencers included soul artist Al Green, funk artist George Clinton, and Afrobeat artist Fela Kuti.

During the initial recording sessions, D'Angelo also worked with personal trainer Mark Jenkins, who was hired to help him get into shape. As Questlove recounted, "Money was definitely overweight by '96, so they got him a drill sergeant physical trainer Mark Jenkins. This guy didn't take no shit. I cannot see D running in Central Park, but he did [...] Push-ups, weight room, sparring every day for three hours. He wouldn't take no shit."

Following the birth of his son, D'Angelo composed the album's first song "Send It On" in 1998 at a recording studio in Virginia. Shortly afterwards, he felt ready to begin the recording for Voodoo. D'Angelo wrote most of Voodoo's material at Electric Lady Studios, as opposed to his method of composing outside the studio as he did for Brown Sugar. Recording sessions for what ended up on the album began in 1998 and continued through to 1999. On the sessions' environment, Touré wrote "What started as the follow-up to D'Angelo's 1995 platinum debut, Brown Sugar, became five years of study at Soul University, complete with classes, pranks, gossip and equal amounts of discipline and laziness." D'Angelo and Questlove have compared the environment to school. Music writer Trevor Schoonmaker examined D'Angelo's and Questlove's initial recording approach, stating "In the endless sessions for the record, the two spent hours trying to conjure the elusive 'vibe' necessary to provoke the album's creation, which included listening to hours of black music that escaped strict classification. Some of that found itself played out in ghostly ways on Voodoo."

=== Soulquarians and guests ===
Production for the album was conducted in a generally informal manner and took place at Electric Lady Studios simultaneously with recording for Erykah Badu's Mama's Gun (2000) and Common's Like Water for Chocolate (2000). This led to impromptu collaborations and a distinctive sound that is featured on the three albums. Frequent visits to the studio were made by fellow neo soul and hip-hop recording artists associated with the Soulquarians collective such as Erykah Badu, Q-Tip, Talib Kweli, James Poyser, and Mos Def. Voodoo's sessions also had visitors not associated with the project, including record producer Rick Rubin, comedian Chris Rock, and rock musician Eric Clapton. D'Angelo previewed songs for them, which they found impressive.

D'Angelo produced songs on Common's Like Water for Chocolate. Q-Tip was originally intended to contribute a verse to the song "Left & Right", but was replaced by rappers Method Man & Redman during recording due to creative differences. Questlove has stated that "general opinion was that the song was cool but nobody was feeling Tip's verse". According to former A&R-man Gary Harris, D'Angelo's manager Dominique Trenier "thought that Tip's verse was wack". Members of the Roots, including Black Thought, Kamal Gray, and Rahzel, also visited the recording sessions in 1997 to 1999; the band was recording their album Things Fall Apart (1999) at Electric Lady Studios. That album featured contributions by D'Angelo, Badu, Mos Def, and Common.

Questlove was the "musical powerhouse" behind several of the Soulquarians' projects during the late 1990s and early 2000s, including Voodoo and Things Fall Apart. In a 2002 interview, he told critic Jim DeRogatis about his role in recording Voodoo and being a part of the Soulquarians, stating "I tried to do all in my power that I could to bring people together – to bring Common to Electric Lady, have him record here whenever so that he could record with some of these other artists. You'd just come into [the studio's] A Room, you don't even know who has a session, but you call me: 'Who's down there?' 'Common's in there today'. So you come down, you order some food, sit down and bulls—, watch a movie, and then it's, 'Let's play something'. And I say, 'Who wants this [track]?' And it would be, 'I want it!' 'No, I want it!'". Questlove has referred to the recording experience at the studio as a "left-of-center black music renaissance".

=== Engineering ===
Audio engineer Russell Elevado, who recorded and mixed Voodoo, along with Erykah Badu's Mama's Gun and Common's Like Water for Chocolate, used old school recording techniques and vintage mixing gear for the albums in order to achieve the distinct sounds found in classic recorded works. While mainstream recording techniques at the time often involved the use of hi-tech digital equipment, Elevado employed the use of analog equipment, tape, and a blend of live instrumentation. Notable from the production was that most of it, with the exception of "Untitled (How Does It Feel)", was recorded live with no overdubbing of its instrumentation, in contrast to contemporary R&B production at the time.

For Voodoo's sessions, D'Angelo appropriated most of the instruments on the album's songs, contributing with drums, electric guitar, keyboards, and percussion. During its recording, he employed amplifiers, microphones, a Fender Rhodes keyboards and organ originally used by musician Stevie Wonder for Talking Book (1972), and a recording board originally used by Jimi Hendrix. On Voodoo's recording atmosphere, D'Angelo stated "I believe Jimi was there. Jimi, Marvin Gaye, all the folks we were gravitating to. I believe they blessed the project".

D'Angelo composed all of the bass lines for Voodoo and sequenced them for Welsh bassist Pino Palladino, whom he had met after being asked to do a duet with B.B. King at the time of Voodoo's earlier sessions. Palladino was asked by D'Angelo to learn and improvise the bass arrangements on his 1961 model P bass. For "The Root", "Greatdayndamornin'", and "Spanish Joint", guitarist Charlie Hunter simultaneously played guitar and bass sections with a custom eight-string guitar/bass combo, which had three lower bass and five upper guitar strings. It also had separate pickups for each set of strings, as well separate outputs for each pickup. In order to adjust production-wise to Hunter's intricate playing, Elevado had separate outputs from Hunter's guitar connected to a separate bass and guitar amplifier. He has said that there was enough separation to manage an adequate sound on both amplifiers, in spite of slight "bleeding into each other" from the pickups in close proximity to each other.

=== Grooves and beats ===
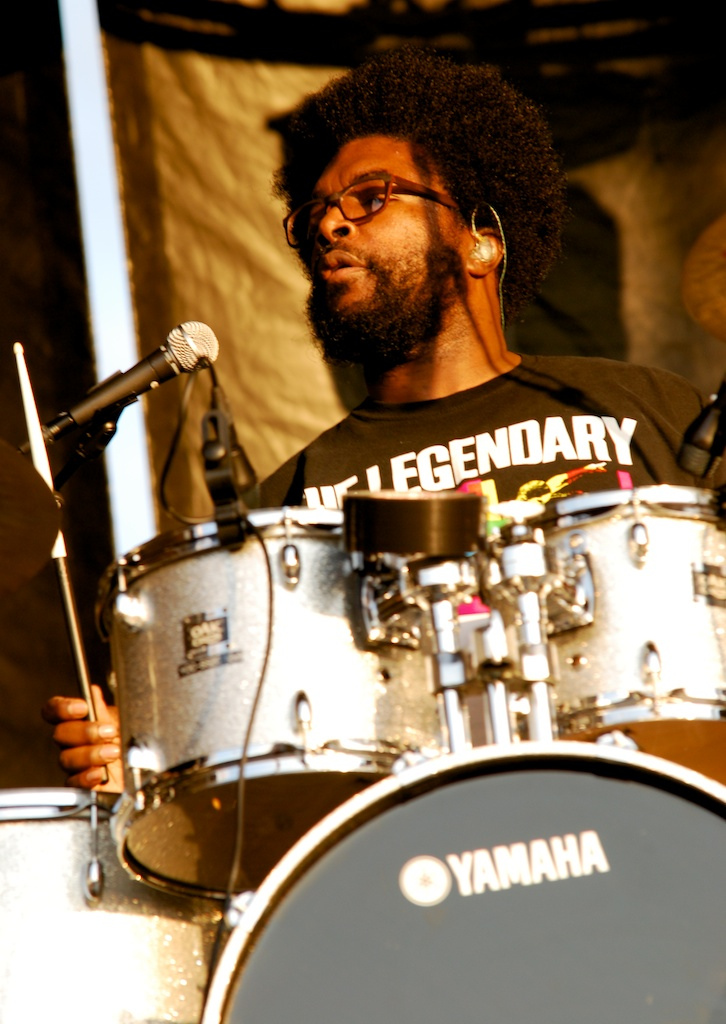
Questlove played drums, co-wrote four songs, and assisted D'Angelo.

D'Angelo and his supporting personnel constructed several of the songs' grooves to hang on the back of the beat for a loose feel. Questlove helped design the sparse funk, soul and hip-hop beats on the generally groove-based record. In later interviews, Questlove discussed that he and D'Angelo incorporated much of the distinctive percussive rhythms of Detroit hip-hop producer, Slum Village-member and the Ummah affiliate J Dilla, also known as Jay Dee. A part of the musical collective Soulquarians, Dilla served as a frequent collaborator of theirs. Although album tracks such as "Left & Right" and "Devil's Pie" help to bring this claim to light, J Dilla himself was not officially credited for production. However, he contributed significantly to Voodoo's overall sound, specifically the rhythm and percussion.

One of the characteristics of the drumming style implemented in recording the album is human timing, complete with imperfections. This resulted in the album's intentional sloppiness. In a later interview, Questlove discussed the intention and purpose of including imperfection in the album's sound, stating "we wanted to play as perfectly as we could, but then deliberately insert the little glitch that makes it sound messed up. The idea was to sound disciplined, but with a total human feel."

Questlove also acknowledged J Dilla's influence over the recording sessions for Voodoo. He said of Dilla's unique programming method during the sessions, "He makes programmed stuff so real, you really can't tell it's programmed. He might program 128 bars, with absolutely no looping or quantizing ... When Q-Tip from A Tribe Called Quest first played me some of his stuff, I said, 'The drums are messed up! The time is wrong!' And when we did a song for D'Angelo's record that Lenny Kravitz was supposed to play on, Lenny said, 'I can't play with this — there's a discrepancy in the drum pattern.' And we're like, 'It's supposed to be this way!'

=== Scrapped tracks ===
According to Questlove, a duet track by D'Angelo and Lauryn Hill, "Feel Like Makin' Love", was planned. Although tapes were sent via FedEx between the two, the collaboration was aborted and the song was instead recorded by D'Angelo. Questlove later said that the duet failed to materialize due to "too many middle men [...] I don't think Lauryn and D ever talked face-to-face." Mistakenly, some critics who reviewed the final track assumed that Hill's vocals are present in the recording.

During the final days of recording Voodoo, Questlove spent time recording a version of Fela Kuti's "Water No Get Enemy", a melodic protest song from Kuti's 1975 album Expensive Shit. He and D'Angelo had intended to revamp the composition into a minimalist soul ballad for Lauryn Hill to contribute vocals for. However, Hill declined and the track ended up as a place-holder for the rough mix of the album. A reconceptualized version of the song was recorded by D'Angelo and guest artists on the charity album Red Hot + Riot (2002).

== Music ==
[I]f I was a singer this would be the record I'd make. Hands down. But that doesn't mean this is for everybody. Music lovers come under 2 umbrellas [...] those who use it for growth and spiritual fulfillment and [...] those who use it for mere background music. The thing is, this record is too extreme to play the middle of the fence.

— Questlove, 1999

In the album's EPK, D'Angelo said that Voodoo is "like a funk album", regarding the genre to be "the natural progression of soul". while Questlove describes it as "vicarious fantasy", a "new direction of soul for 2000", and "the litmus test that will reveal the most for your personality", inspired by "a love for the dead state of black music, a love to show our idols how much they taught us". Of the album's title and meaning, D'Angelo told USA Today: "[T]he myriad influences found on it can be traced through the blues and back deeper in history through songs sung–in religious [voodoo] ceremonies." This theme is illustrated in Voodoo's liner photography by Thierry LesGoudes, which depicts D'Angelo participating in a voodoo ceremony. According to Voodoo's press kit: "Lyrically, D'Angelo offers that much of Voodoo is personal reflection: touching on subjects like spirituality, sexuality, growth, and in particular, becoming a father. Musically, as he puts it, Voodoo is 'definitely groove-based'".

Voodoo incorporates musical elements of jazz, funk, hip-hop, blues, and soul, as well as ambient music with a musical layer shaped by guitar-based funk. It features vintage influences and a looser, more improvisational structure, which contrasts the more conventional song structure of Brown Sugar. Music writer Greg Kot has considered the album a production of the Soulquarians, calling it "the most radical of the many fine records" conceived by the collective's members. In an interview with the New Orleans Times-Picayune's Shawn Rhea, D'Angelo attributed the album's experimental and jam-like atmosphere to the fact that most of Voodoo was recorded "live and its first take". On its eclectic and conceptual style, Rhea commented "[D'Angelo] seems to have channeled the brilliance of his musical forefathers, living and dead, during the crafting of this album. It is a complex, intricate collection of songs that, like voodoo, is simultaneously secular and spiritual, sensual and sacred, earthbound and ethereal". Recording engineer Russell Elevado's analog mixing and old school production techniques contributed to the album's jazz element and vintage sound. On its jazz influence, D'Angelo stated "because a lot of the album was cut live and has free playing on it, it was hard not to go in a jazz direction".

While most musical compositions rely on tension and release, which can be produced by factors such as soft verses and loud choruses, gradual buildup, subtle tension within verses or over the course of the bridge, or harmonic tension in chords that provides space for improvisation, D'Angelo's arrangements for Voodoo subdivide the tension into each of the songs' moments. According to music critic Steve McPherson, the concept results in "no linear way to measure how far off things slide before they pull themselves back ... can't be measured in beats or fractions of beats in a meaningful way. For lack of a less clichéd word, it's entirely 'feel'". This type of syncopation serves as the center for Voodoo, rather than the more conventional method of using it as flavoring or departure from the center. According to New York Daily News music journalist Jim Farber, "In order to counter the slickness of modern R&B, D'Angelo's album reconfigured – and updated – the adventurous song structures and lowdown grooves of early-'70s works like Curtis Mayfield's 'Move On Up', Isaac Hayes' 'Hot Buttered Soul' and Marvin Gaye's 'Let's Get It On'."

The album features aggressive multi-tracking of D'Angelo's voice, a technique similar to the production of Sly & the Family Stone's There's a Riot Goin' On (1971) and Marvin Gaye's Let's Get It On (1973). The multi-tracking on Voodoo significantly affected the clarity of D'Angelo's vocals. In Voodoo's liner notes, Saul Williams wrote of its heavy use of multi-tracking, stating "You might respond, 'Lyrics? Yo, I can't even understand half the shit that D'Angelo be saying. That nigga sounds like Bobby McFerrin on opium'. And I'd say, 'You're right. Neither can I. But I am drawn to figure out what it is that he's saying. His vocal collaging intrigues me'". "Between every staccato, breathy, slack-jaw-smooth lyric", wrote Spin's Julianne Shephard, "was an implied syllable of psychedelic soul sex". Music writers have also noted the production style and sound of Voodoo as reminiscent of the sound of the P-Funk opus Mothership Connection (1975), Gaye's downtempo disco-soul record I Want You (1976), and Miles Davis's jazz fusion works In a Silent Way (1969) and Bitches Brew (1970).

D'Angelo and his crew also utilized a hip hop production style, which often subordinates song structure to a stable foundation for a rapper's delivery and flow. This was familiar to D'Angelo, as his first original recordings were rap demos. Subsequently, most of the songs were performed without a definitive structure, settling into a mid-tempo groove with minimal verse-chorus-bridge progression. This also resulted in an emphasis on texture over both structure and hooks. New York writer Ethan Smith noted this occurrence, stating "most of the songs aren't really songs at all – at least, not in the traditional sense". While not predominant on the album, some tracks incorporate sampling. Most of its production was influenced by hip-hop producer J Dilla's input. On J Dilla's influence, Questlove stated "He's the zenith of hip-hop to us. Jay Dee helped to bring out the album's dirty sound and encouraged the false starts and the nonquantized sound of the record".

=== Songs ===
The opening track "Playa Playa" features basketball metaphors and gospel overtones, which accompany the track's slow funk and jazz vibe. On his bass playing in the song, Pino Palladino recalled "I was thinking about Stevie Wonder in the choruses and P-Funk in the verses". Rob Evanoff of All About Jazz called the song "an uplifting soul ride", and stated that it evokes an image of "a musical train seen far off in the distance, slowly getting bigger as it gets closer". Evanoff also compared the track's style to the jam-sound of Pink Floyd, and wrote "it surrounds you with a deep thick infectious groove that, at first, shadows and then envelopes your senses in such a way that is equal bits liberating, intoxicating and hypnotic…you close your eyes and are transported into another dimension". On the song's lyrics, one critic wrote that "D'Angelo disses all neo-soul wannabes by calmly singing 'Bring the drama playa/Give me all U got'". "Devil's Pie" is a funk and hip-hop diatribe with a lyrical theme concerning hip-hop excess, and it is accompanied by P-Funk style harmonies and low-key singing by D'Angelo. It is a bass-driven track produced by DJ Premier, who contributes to its hip-hop texture. The song's theme also incorporates religious imagery into its message of social strife. Questlove has stated that "Devil's Pie" was written to address the issues of "the money hungry jiggafied state of the world we're in".

"Left & Right" is a funky party jam featuring rappers Method Man and Redman, who exchange verses as D'Angelo sings the song's verses and chorus. Entertainment Weekly's Matt Diehl calls Method Man's and Redman's lyrics "misogynistic", adding that it upsets Voodoo's "organically sensual vibe". The introspective track "The Line" has a downtempo, spiritual sound with lyrics about dealing with some unnamed adversity. According to one critic, it "could be about his MIA status ('Will I hang or get left hangin?/Will I fall off or is it bangin?/I say it's up to God'), or about anyone facing doubters with a revolver loaded with talent and self-confidence ('I'm gonna put my finger on the trigger/I'm gonna pull it, and then we gon' see/What the deal/I'm for real')". Music critic Robert Christgau interpreted the lyrics to be "unjudgmental, unsentimental ... in which a young black man lays out the reasons he's ready to die-leaving the listener to wonder why the fuck he should have to think about it". Andy Peterson of The GW Hatchet viewed that the adversity is "the price of fame" or "lamenting a lost lover".

"Chicken Grease"
The song's light, sparse funk sound was the result of old school production techniques employed by recording engineer Russell Elevado.

The sparse funk song "Chicken Grease" has lyrics advising against acting "uptight", and it features D'Angelo referencing the line "I know you got soul" from Eric B. & Rakim's song of the same name (1987). It contains an ambiguous harmony and bass by Pino Palladino, who evokes the playing style of James Jamerson, with spontaneously improvised variations-on-a-theme parts that sit back "in the pocket". The track was originally intended for Common's Like Water for Chocolate, but D'Angelo offered Common the song "Geto Heaven Part Two" as a trade. "Chicken Grease" is named after a technical term that musician Prince used for his guitarist to play a 9th minor chord while playing 16th notes. The song contains background voices, which one writer described as "omnipresent party people channeled in from 'What's Going On' and 'Voodoo Chile', laughin and carryin on all over". Co-written by D'Angelo's former girlfriend, singer Angie Stone, "Send It On" contains lyrics concerning themes of honesty and faith in love, and features jazz trumpeter Roy Hargrove on flugelhorn. Titled after a southern colloquial conflation of the terms "One More Time" and "Again", the mid-tempo ballad "One Mo'Gin" has its narrator reminiscing about a former lover. Its introductory sound consisting of soft organ work and dim percussion evokes the sound of D'Angelo's "Sh★t, Damn, Motherf★cker" (1995). "One Mo'Gin" contains strong jazz overtones and a prominent rocksteady drum rhythm played by Questlove. It incorporates Delta blues-style bass and keyboard-driven verses with a melodic hook. The song is introduced with lead-in bass licks by Pino Palladino, who adds musical texture to its sparse composition by using 10th notes and other arpeggio shapes. According to Seattle Weekly's Tricia Romano, the song's music actualizes "new skool sensibility with old school soul".

"Spanish Joint"
The high tempo, salsa-influenced track features Latin grooves and jazzy trumpet by co-writer Roy Hargrove.

According to Questlove, "The Root", "Spanish Joint", and "Greatdayndamornin' / Booty'" serve as the "virtuoso part of the record", featuring intricate technical arrangements and Charlie Hunter playing both electric and bass guitar. "The Root" is a mid-tempo heartbreak song with the bass line and guitar solo played simultaneously by Hunter on an eight-string guitar. It is about a vengeful woman's effect on the narrator: "In the name of love and hope she took my shield and sword ... From the pit of the bottom that knows no floor/Like the rain to the dirt, from the vine to the wine/From the alpha of creation, to the end of all time". Miles Marshall Lewis writes of the song's subject matter, "[it] can actually be digested and emotionally felt, sadly rare for Hot 97 R&B." Co-written by Roy Hargrove, "Spanish Joint" is a salsa-infused, high tempo track about karma. It incorporates rhythmic Brazilian guitar licks by Hunter, funky horn arrangements by Hargrove, and Latin grooves and fusion instrumentation similar to Stevie Wonder's "Don't You Worry 'bout a Thing" (1973). "Feel Like Makin' Love" is a cover of Roberta Flack's 1974 hit of the same name with a low-key, quiet storm sound. "Greatdayndamornin' / Booty'" features double rimshots placed behind the beat by Questlove.

[D'Angelo] didn't see this at first because we had already did a song about his son. But I told him the music here fit the mood better. It's like a bunch of toy boxes playing at once... It gives you that sad feeling that 'Higher' gave you on Brown Sugar; a dope song that you don't want to hear because you know that this is the last song you're gonna hear in some time. I know D wanted to do a song that spoke of history. Not just to his son. but to God, to Africa and the world.

— Questlove, on "Africa", 1999

Co-written by Raphael Saadiq, "Untitled (How Does It Feel)" is a tribute to one of D'Angelo's primary influences, Prince, and evokes his early Controversy period. The similarity of D'Angelo's music on Voodoo to Prince was addressed in Saul Williams's liner notes, as he stated "I'd pay to see Prince's face as he listens to this album." Questlove described the song as "finding the line between parody and honesty [...] In an era of 'the cover song', redoing a Prince song was taboo. This is the second best thing". It follows a six eight signature and features electric guitar interplay throughout, which is reminiscent of the Jimi Hendrix guitar style and "Maggot Brain" sound. The song contains a drum pattern with a uniform dynamic. D'Angelo's vocals were overdubbed several times to produce the sound of a choir singing harmonies during choruses, all of which were sung by D'Angelo. The song's sexually explicit lyrics describe the narrator's plea to his lover for sex, as exemplified in the second verse: "Love to make you wet/In between your thighs, cause/I love when it comes inside of you/I get so excited when I'm around you, baby" It has been cited by critics as the album's best song.

"Africa"
The album's closing track, composed by D'Angelo in honor of his son and his cultural roots

The philosophical album closer "Africa" celebrates D'Angelo's heritage, while reaffirming his contemporary mission in life. It has been cited by Questlove as his favorite song on the album. The theme of "Africa" concerns the finding of a spiritual home amid geographical displacement, and of passing that sense of belonging on to one's children. "Africa" was originally written in honor of D'Angelo's son, Michael Archer Jr., and ended up as a dedication to history, Africa, and God. Opening with a shimmery rustle of chimes, the song contains a drum interpretation of Prince's "I Wonder U" from his Parade (1986), which was also utilized for the Ursula Rucker and the Roots track "The Return to Innocence Lost" from Things Fall Apart. Questlove discussed producing the opening chime sounds for "Africa", stating "we took the cover off the rhodes and mic'd 'em". One critic described C. Edward Alford's guitar work for "Africa" as "backward guitar solos (at least they sound backward)". Another critic described the song as a "lullaby" and "a gorgeous, opalescent closer ... a prayer of sorts". Voodoo's coda, which consists of chopped-up track snippets run backwards, plays at the song's conclusion.

== Marketing ==
We knew this album would be a hard pill to swallow. People may want D to play into their R&B love-god fantasies—wearing Armani suits, singing something sweet in your ear—but he made a conscious effort to shake people up, to take a chance. It's not a middle-ground record—you're either going to love it or hate it.

— Questlove, speaking with Entertainment Weekly in 2000

The album's release was preceded by several delays, which were primarily caused by the folding of D'Angelo's former label EMI Records and legal troubles with his management. It was originally scheduled for release on November 23, 1999, When Voodoo was originally presented to Virgin Records executives, mixed opinions formed on whether or not it would succeed commercially, as the project had been heavily financed by the label. In return for the production budget, Virgin executives expected a record with potential for radio-oriented success. However, Voodoo's unconventional sound proved difficult to translate into singles suited for contemporary radio success, in contrast to the more accessible Brown Sugar.

"Devil's Pie" and "Left & Right" were released as singles but failed to make a significant commercial impact, with the latter having been aimed at R&B and hip-hop-oriented radio stations due to the prominence of rappers Redman and Method Man on the track. A music video for "Left & Right", created by director Malik Hassan Sayeed and producer Rich Ford Jr., was anticipated by fans and MTV network executives that had planned special promotions and a world premiere for the clip. However, Sayeed's concept of a concert video that paid tribute to funk shows of the past expended Virgin's budget and resulted in a missed deadline for the MTV premiere. As punishment, the network refused to put the final edit of music video in rotation. It was eventually world-premiered by BET on Thanksgiving Day. According to Ford, both the single and the video went commercially unnoticed due to MTV's refusal to place the song's video in rotation.

The limited success with singles and lukewarm opinions from label executives led to more promotional efforts and a public response made by D'Angelo's management through issuing a statement, which cited Voodoo as the R&B musical equivalent of art rock band Radiohead's acclaimed studio album OK Computer (1997). While both records feature an experimental edge, in terms of sound and lyrical themes, the English indie rock scene to which the latter had belonged was album-oriented, as opposed to the contemporary R&B scene in the United States, which was more single-oriented at the time. Prior to its release, Virgin launched an extensive, multi-layered campaign for the album, which setup several promotional performances by D'Angelo in 1999, including a guest performance on the season premiere of The Chris Rock Show on September 17, New York's Key Club, the National Black Programmers Coalition meeting in New Orleans on November 20, KMEL San Francisco's House of Soul show on December 10, and KKBT L.A.'s Holiday Cooldown on December 11. Following commitments made by the label for the album's distribution in the UK, continental Europe, Australia, and New Zealand, D'Angelo appeared at London's Music of Black Origin Awards on October 6. Other promotional events included signings and in-store appearances by D'Angelo at shopping venues such as Macy's, Virgin Megastore, and Fulton Mall in New York City, which attracted a considerable number of D'Angelo's female fans. A remix album, Voodoo DJ Soul Essentials (2000), was also issued by Virgin.

The release of the controversial music video for "Untitled (How Does It Feel)" prior to the album's release has been cited as having the greatest promotional impact, boosting the song's appeal and D'Angelo's popularity. Directed by Paul Hunter, the video features D'Angelo, filmed from the waist-up, lip-synching in the nude. According to writer Keith M. Harris, it portrayed D'Angelo's "discursive play with masculinity and blackness". Billboard had written of the video, "it's pure sexuality. D'Angelo, muscularly cut and glistening, is shot from the hips up, naked, with just enough shown to prompt a slow burning desire in most any woman who sees it. The video alone could make the song one of the biggest of the coming year". It would earn three nominations for the 2000 MTV Video Music Awards, including Video of the Year, Best R&B Video, and Best Male Video. Gaining significant amount of airplay on the BET and MTV networks, the video reintroduced D'Angelo as a sex icon to a newer generation of fans. It was also viewed at a promotional party thrown in celebration of the album's release, which took place in January 2000 at the Centro-Fly nightclub in Chelsea, Manhattan. Douglas Century of The New York Times wrote of the club's appearance as "packed and sweaty, with decor and soul music out of a 1970's time warp: multiple video screens playing images of Curtis Mayfield and vintage Soul Train episodes, replete with dancers in Day-Glo bell-bottoms".

In January 2000, a press release for Voodoo was issued discussing the album's experimental edge and the anticipation for its release. It called Voodoo "the CD that D'Angelo was put on this earth to create" and "quite literally the record that much of the universal soul nation has been feenin for." Voodoo was ultimately released on January 25, by the Virgin-imprint label Cheeba Sound in the United States, January 18 in Canada and February 14 in the United Kingdom on EMI, awaiting eager anticipation from fans and critics. Voodoo was issued with a parental advisory label, due to profanities and sexually explicit lyrics present on the tracks "Devil's Pie" and "Left & Right", and also as a "clean" edited version with an alternate cover. A double LP release was made available in the UK through EMI.

=== Sales ===
In its first week, Voodoo debuted at number 1 on the US Billboard 200, selling 320,000 copies. It entered the Billboard 200 on February 12, 2000, and remained on the chart for thirty-three consecutive weeks. Its debut replaced Carlos Santana's Supernatural (1999) at the top of the chart. It had sold over 500,000 copies within its first two months of release. The album charted for thirty-three weeks on the Billboard 200.

Voodoo charted on several international album charts, including the United Kingdom, Switzerland, France, the Netherlands, Sweden, Norway, and New Zealand. On February 24, 2000, it was certified gold in sales by the Canadian Recording Industry Association, following sales in excess of 50,000 copies in Canada. Two months after its US release, Voodoo was certified platinum on March 1, 2000, by the Recording Industry Association of America. The album's platinum certification had coincided with the commencement of Voodoo's supporting tour. By mid-2000, the album had reached sales of 1.3 million copies in the United States. By 2005, the album had sold over 1.7 million copies in the US, according to Nielsen SoundScan. Despite its success, Voodoo did not achieve his debut album's sales performance nor generate the single-oriented success D'Angelo's label had envisioned.

== Critical reception ==
Professional ratings
Review scores
Source	Rating
AllMusic	5/5 stars
Entertainment Weekly	A−
Melody Maker	4.5/5 stars
The New Rolling Stone Album Guide	4/5 stars
NME	9/10
Pitchfork	10/10
Q	4/5 stars
Rolling Stone	3/5 stars
USA Today	4/4 stars
The Village Voice	A−

Voodoo was met with rave reviews and hailed by critics as a masterpiece. In The Village Voice, Robert Christgau called it a "deeply brave and pretentious record ... signifies like a cross between lesser Tricky and Sly's Riot Goin' On", and wrote of D'Angelo, "he leads from strength" rather than "tune-and-hook", "a feel for bass more disquieting than bootalicious." NME praised its diverse sound and commented that the album "represents nothing less than African American music at a crossroads ... To simply call D'Angelo's work neo-classic soul, as per corporate diktat, would be reductive, for that would be to ignore the elements of vaudeville jazz, Memphis horns, ragtime blues, funk and bass grooves, not to mention hip-hop, that slip out of every pore of these 13 haunted songs." Christopher John Farley of Time called it a "richly imagined CD". Mark Anthony Neal of PopMatters called it "the working blueprint for 'post-Soul' black pop". Joshua Klein of The A.V. Club commented that the album "often recalls the muddier bits of Sly Stone's later works [...] and the much-missed balladry of prime Prince" and stated, "D'Angelo's mellow strategy frequently pays off [...] a brave antidote to current pop and hip-hop trends."

Despite perceiving a "heavy-handed emphasis on groove over melody" and "self-indulgent" song durations, Miles Marshall Lewis of The Village Voice viewed the album as a progression for D'Angelo and compared it to Prince's acclaimed Sign o' the Times (1987), noting that the latter album was initially perceived by most critics as "uneven". Greg Tate of Vibe dubbed it "the most daring song-oriented album by a mainstream R&B artist of his generation." Steve Jones of USA Today wrote that "no other R&B artist today seems to have as acute an understanding of where he comes from as D'Angelo, and none seems as willing to take risks in exploring where he should be heading". The Austin Chronicle's Christopher Gray commented that "Voodoo unlocks the brain's inner freak like an especially nimble Harry Whodini". Rob Evanoff of All About Jazz gave it five out of five stars and called it "a record you put on and let it seep in, soaking your essence and one that evolves over subsequent listens... an aural aphrodisiac". He found it to be in the tradition of classic jazz albums and wrote of its musical significance, stating:

As most jazz aficionados will already attest to, a truly classic record is not one you can turn on and off as if it were only a switch. It's an important ingredient of an otherworldly experience ... When you set the needle down on Miles' Kind of Blue or Coltrane's Giant Steps or Dexter Gordon's Go, you have an ulterior motive, you seek to escape, to enjoy, to experience, to extrapolate your inner demons. This process is a musical form of Voodoo, which Sir D'Angelo discovered while making this record, and hopes you will too.

However, some critics found it inconsistent. Music journalist Peter Shapiro criticized its "loose playing and bohemian self-indulgence", stating "Voodoo drifted all over the map in a blunted haze". Rolling Stone's James Hunter disapproved of the experimental and loose-sounding structure, and viewed that it does not attain its potential, stating "long stretches of it are unfocused and unabsorbing [...] Voodoo flatters the real at the expense of the thing. The result is superb smoke, but smoke nonetheless". By contrast, Jon Caramanica wrote in The New Rolling Stone Album Guide (2004) that "D'Angelo achieves through nuance what some singers with decades of experience and training never achieve: a throbbing, vital presence, that demands attention, even as it shuns it".

=== Accolades ===
In 2001, Voodoo won a Grammy Award for Best R&B Album at the 43rd Grammy Awards, which was awarded to D'Angelo and recording engineer Russell Elevado. The song "Untitled (How Does It Feel)" won for Best Male R&B Vocal Performance and was also nominated for Best R&B Song. The song was also ranked number 12 on The Village Voice's Pazz & Jop critics' poll of 2000, as well as number 4 on Rolling Stone magazine's "End of Year Critics & Readers Poll" of the top singles of the year. Voodoo proved to be one of the most critically praised and awarded albums of the year, topping several critics' and publications' "end of year" lists; Bloomsbury Academic's 33⅓ series states that the album "emerged as the year's critical darling". The album earned the number 6 spot on The Village Voice's 2000 Pazz & Jop critics' poll. Rolling Stone and Spin magazine both ranked it on their "albums of the year" lists, while Time magazine named Voodoo as the number 1 album of 2000. Voodoo was named one of the ten best albums of 2000 by several New York Times staff writers, including Ben Ratliff (number 2), Neil Strauss (number 3), Ann Powers (number 2), and Jon Pareles (number 1).

In 2003, Rolling Stone ranked the album number 488 on its list of The 500 Greatest Albums of All Time, and at number 481 in a revised list in 2012. In the 2020, the album was re-ranked at 28, calling it "an album heavy on bass and drenched in a post-coital haze". In 2009, Pitchfork ranked Voodoo number 44 on its list of the Top 200 Albums of the 2000s decade, calling it "a triumph of hands-on, real-time, old-school soul minimalism" and citing D'Angelo's vocals as "maybe the most erotically tactile singing put to disc this decade". Rolling Stone placed the album at number 23 on its list of the 100 Best Albums of the Decade, stating "The decade's most magnificent R&B record was also its most inventive — so far ahead of its time that it still sounds radical". AllMusic editor Andy Kellman has cited Brown Sugar and Voodoo as "two of the most excellent and singular R&B albums of the past 15 years".

Publication	Country	Accolade	Year	Rank	Ref.
Pitchfork	United States	The Top 200 Albums of the 2000s	2009	44	
Rolling Stone	United States	Albums of the Year	2000	*	
Rolling Stone	United States	The 500 Greatest Albums of All Time	2003	488	
Rolling Stone	United States	100 Best Albums of the Decade	2009	23	
Rolling Stone	United States	The 500 Greatest Albums of All Time	2020	28	
Spin	United States	Albums of the Year	2000	4	
Spin	United States	100 Greatest Albums 1985–2005	2005	80	
Time	United States	Albums of the Year	2000	1	
Wall of Sound	United States	Albums of the Year	2000	10	
The Guardian	United Kingdom	The 100 Best Albums of the 21st Century	2019	13	
Muzik	United Kingdom	Albums of the Year	2000	7	
Uncut	United Kingdom	150 Greatest Albums of the Decade	2009	68	
Vanity Fair	United States	Elvis Costello's 500 Favorite Albums	2000	*	
The Village Voice	United States	Pazz & Jop	2000	6	
The Wire	United Kingdom	50 Records of the Year	2000	32	
(*) designates lists that are unordered.

== Tour and aftermath ==
Following Voodoo's release, D'Angelo embarked on his second international tour in support of the album, The Voodoo World Tour. The tour was sponsored by the clothing company Levi Strauss & Co., and it featured D'Angelo promoting an end to gun violence. After signing an initiative on June 7, 2000, at Hamilton High School in West Los Angeles to collect a million signatures by November 7 in support of "common-sense solutions" to end gun violence, the anti-gun violence organization PAX agreed to sponsor the tour. The tour was also set to feature a wall composed of denim by Levi's, made available for fans to sign in support of anti-gun violence. D'Angelo was backed by a group of session personnel and other musicians, assembled and directed by Questlove, called the Soultronics. J Dilla's group Slum Village opened on several dates, while R&B singer Anthony Hamilton sang backup within the Soultronics on occasion.

D'Angelo's wardrobe during the tour included tank tops, black leather pants, and boots. Rolling Stone's Touré commented on one of the outings, "The Soultronics begin each show in all black, but beyond that one requirement, each looks completely distinct. One man is in a deacon's robe, another in a long cape with a knit ski cap that says FBI. There's a feather boa, a few badass leather coats, and Questlove's mighty Afro. There's a P-Funkish freaky flair to the Soultronics' look." In contrast to D'Angelo's performing behind his keyboard when promoting Brown Sugar, his performances were more lively for Voodoo. Tour manager Alan Leeds, who headed James Brown's late 1960s and early 1970s outings, as well as Prince's Purple Rain Tour in the mid-1980s, cited The Voodoo Tour as his most memorable gig. Footage from the tour was later used in the music video for Voodoo's next single "Send It On".

With ticket prices ranging from $49 to $79, the tour became one of the most attended shows of 2000. By July, the tour's first half had sold out in each city. The tour lasted nearly eight months, while performances went for up to three hours a night. The tour began on March 1, 2000, at the House of Blues in Los Angeles. The Voodoo Tour was taken internationally to venues including Paris Olympia, Trump Taj Mahal, Brixton Academy, the Montreux Jazz Festival, the North Sea Jazz Festival and the Free Jazz Festival in Brazil.

The music video for "Untitled (How Does It Feel)" portrayed D'Angelo as a sex symbol to mainstream music audiences, which had repercussions on The Voodoo Tour's second half. During the tour, female fans yelled out for him to take his clothes off, while others tossed clothes onto the stage. As trumpeter Roy Hargrove recounted, "We couldn't get through one song before women would start to scream for him to take off something [...] It wasn't about the music. All they wanted him to do was take off his clothes." This led to frustration and both onstage and offstage outbursts by D'Angelo, with him breaking stage equipment. Questlove later said, "He'd get angry and start breaking shit. The audience thinking, 'Fuck your art, I wanna see your ass!', made him angry." Although some were cancelled due to D'Angelo's throat infection during the tour's mid-March dates, many shows were cancelled due to his personal and emotional problems. D'Angelo chose on several occasions to not perform on scheduled dates, and delayed others to do physical workouts like stomach crunches. According to Questlove, three weeks worth of concert dates were cancelled, including two weeks worth of shows in Japan. He elaborated on the experience in a 2003 interview for The Believer, saying that:

I mean, everyone's insecure, but he's insecure to the level where I felt as though I had to lose myself and play cheerleader. Some nights on tour he'd look in the mirror and say, 'I don't look like the video' It was totally in his mind [...] We would hold the show for an hour and a half if he didn't feel mentally prepared or physically prepared. Some shows got cancelled because he didn't feel physically prepared, but it was such a delusion [...] He was like, 'They don't understand. They don’t get it. They just want me to take off my clothes' [...] Had he known what the repercussions of 'Untitled' would’ve been, I don't think he would've done it.

In the same interview, Questlove also said that he had not been fully compensated for his work on Voodoo, stating "I didn't get the rest of my check." Several of D'Angelo's peers and affiliates have noted the commercial impact of the "Untitled (How Does It Feel)" music video and The Voodoo Tour as contributing factors to D'Angelo's extended period of absence from the music scene after Voodoo.

== Track listing ==
All tracks produced by D'Angelo, except where noted.

Voodoo track listing
No.	Title	Writer(s)	Producer(s)	Length
1.	"Playa Playa"	Michael Archer; Angie Stone; Ahmir Thompson		7:07
2.	"Devil's Pie"	M. Archer; Christopher Edward Martin	D'Angelo; DJ Premier	5:21
3.	"Left & Right" (featuring Method Man & Redman)	M. Archer; Kamaal Fareed; Reggie Noble; Clifford Smith		4:46
4.	"The Line"	M. Archer		5:15
5.	"Send It On"	M. Archer; Luther Archer; Stone		5:57
6.	"Chicken Grease"	M. Archer; James Poyser; Thompson		4:36
7.	"One Mo'gin"	M. Archer		6:15
8.	"The Root"	M. Archer; L. Archer; Charlie Hunter		6:33
9.	"Spanish Joint"	M. Archer; Roy Hargrove		5:44
10.	"Feel Like Makin' Love"	Eugene McDaniels		6:22
11.	"Greatdayndamornin'/Booty"	M. Archer; Hunter; Stone; Thompson		7:35
12.	"Untitled (How Does It Feel)"	M. Archer; Raphael Saadiq	D'Angelo; Saadiq	7:10
13.	"Africa"	M. Archer; L. Archer; Stone; Thompson		6:13

== Personnel ==
Credits adapted from album booklet liner notes.

#	Title	Notes
	Voodoo	Executive producers: D'Angelo and Dominique Trenier for Cheeba Sound Recordings; Recorded by Russell "The Dragon" Elevado; Mixed by D'Angelo and Russell "The Dragon" Elevado, except "Devil's Pie" (Elevado); Assistant engineer: Steve Mandel; All songs recorded and mixed at Electric Lady Studios, New York; Mastered by Tom Coyne at Sterling Sound, New York; Management: Dominique Trenier and Stan Poses for Cheeba Management
1	"Playa Playa"	Produced by D'Angelo; All vocals performed by D'Angelo; Vocal and musical arrangements by D'Angelo; Guitar: Mike "Dino" Campbell; Bass: Pino Palladino; Drums: Questlove; Horns: Roy Hargrove; All other instruments: D'Angelo; Contains a sample from "Players Balling" performed by the Ohio Players
2	"Devil's Pie"	Produced by D'Angelo and DJ Premier; Programming by DJ Premier; All other instruments: D'Angelo; Contains a sample from "Success" performed by Fat Joe; Contains a sample from "Interlude" performed by Raekwon; Contains a sample from "Jericho Jerk" performed by Pierre Henry; Contains a sample from "And If I Had" performed by Teddy Pendergrass; Contains an excerpt from "Fakin' Jax" performed by INI; Contains an excerpt from "Big Daddy Anthem" performed by Natruel
3	"Left & Right"	Produced by D'Angelo; Rap performed by Method Man and Redman; Vocal and musical arrangements by D'Angelo; Vocal percussion: Q-Tip; Drums: Questlove; All other instruments: D'Angelo
4	"The Line"	Produced by D'Angelo; All vocals performed by D'Angelo; Vocal and musical arrangements by D'Angelo; Guitar: Raphael Saadiq; All other instruments: D'Angelo
5	"Send It On"	Produced by D'Angelo; All vocals performed by D'Angelo; Vocal and musical arrangements by D'Angelo; Guitar: C. Edward Alford; Bass: Pino Palladino; Drums: Questlove; Flugelhorn and Trumpet: Roy Hargrove; All other instruments: D'Angelo; Contains an interpolation of "Sea of Tranquility" written by Kool & the Gang
6	"Chicken Grease"	Produced by D'Angelo; All vocals performed by D'Angelo; Vocal and musical arrangements by D'Angelo; Bass: Pino Palladino; Drums: Questlove; Keyboards: James Poyser; All other instruments: D'Angelo
7	"One Mo'gin"	Produced by D'Angelo; All vocals performed by D'Angelo; Vocal and musical arrangements by D'Angelo; Bass: Pino Palladino; All other instruments: D'Angelo
8	"The Root"	Produced by D'Angelo; All vocals performed by D'Angelo; Vocal and musical arrangements by D'Angelo; Bass and Guitar: Charlie Hunter; All other instruments: D'Angelo
9	"Spanish Joint"	Produced by D'Angelo; All vocals performed by D'Angelo; Vocal and musical arrangements by D'Angelo; Bass and guitar: Charlie Hunter; Drums: Questlove; Horns: Roy Hargrove; Congas: Giovanni Hidalgo; All other instruments: D'Angelo
10	"Feel Like Makin' Love"	Produced by D'Angelo; All vocals performed by D'Angelo; Vocal and musical arrangements by D'Angelo; Bass: Pino Palladino; Drums: Questlove; All other instruments: D'Angelo
11	"Greatdayndamornin' / Booty"	Produced by D'Angelo; All vocals performed by D'Angelo; Vocal arrangement by D'Angelo; Musical arrangement: D'Angelo and Charlie Hunter; Bass and guitar: Charlie Hunter; Drums: Questlove; All other instruments: D'Angelo
12	"Untitled (How Does It Feel)"	Produced by D'Angelo and Raphael Saadiq; All vocals performed by D'Angelo; Vocal arrangement by D'Angelo; Musical arrangement: D'Angelo and Raphael Saadiq; Guitar: C. Edward Alford; Bass and Guitar: Raphael Saadiq; All other instruments: D'Angelo
13	"Africa"	Produced by D'Angelo; All vocals performed by D'Angelo; Vocal and musical arrangements by D'Angelo; Guitar: C. Edward Alford; Drums: Questlove; All other instruments: D'Angelo; Contains a drum sample from "I Wonder U" performed by Prince

== Charts ==
=== Weekly charts ===
Chart (2000)	Peak position
Australian Albums (ARIA)	139
Canadian Albums (Billboard)	7
Canadian R&B Albums (Nielsen SoundScan)	4
Dutch Albums (Album Top 100)	28
European Albums (Music & Media)	43
French Albums (SNEP)	57
German Albums (Offizielle Top 100)	68
New Zealand Albums (RMNZ)	10
Norwegian Albums (VG-lista)	9
Scottish Albums (Official Charts)	100
Swedish Albums (Sverigetopplistan)	13
Swiss Albums (Schweizer Hitparade)	42
UK Albums (Official Charts)	21
UK R&B Albums (Official Charts)	3
US Billboard 200	1
US Top R&B/Hip-Hop Albums (Billboard)	1

Chart (2025)	Peak position
Belgian Albums (Ultratop Flanders)	102
Greek Albums (IFPI)	71
Japanese Download Albums (Billboard Japan)	21
Portuguese Albums (AFP)	173

=== Year-end charts ===
Chart (2000)	Position
US Billboard 200	49
US Top R&B/Hip-Hop Albums (Billboard)	7

== Certifications ==
Region	Certification	Certified units/sales
Canada (Music Canada)	Gold	50,000^{^}
United Kingdom (BPI)	Gold	100,000^{‡}
United States (RIAA)	Platinum	1,000,000^{^}
^{^} Shipments figures based on certification alone.^{‡} Sales+streaming figures based on certification alone.

== See also ==
- List of Billboard 200 number-one albums of 2000
- Progressive soul

== Bibliography ==
- Chris Jisi (2003). Brave New Bass: Interviews and Lessons with the Innovators, Trendsetters and Visionaries. Hal Leonard Corporation. ISBN 0-87930-763-3.
- Ashyia N. Henderson; David G. Oblender (2001). Contemporary Black Biography: Profiles Form the International Black Community. Vol. 27. Gale Group. ISBN 0-7876-4618-0.
- Clifford Thompson (2001). Current Biography Yearbook. Vol. 62, No. 5. The H.W. Wilson Company. ISBN 0-8242-1016-6.
- Trevor Schoonmaker (2003). Fela: From West Africa to West Broadway. Macmillan. ISBN 1-4039-6210-3.
- Brackett, Nathan; Hoard, Christian, eds. (November 1, 2004). The New Rolling Stone Album Guide (Completely Revised and Updated 4th ed.). Simon & Schuster. ISBN 0-7432-0169-8.
- Peter Shapiro; Al Spicer (2006). The Rough Guide to Soul and R&B. Rough Guides. ISBN 1-84353-264-6.
- Saul Williams; D'Angelo (2000). Voodoo (CD liner notes). Beverly Hills, CA: Virgin Records America.
- Keith M. Harris (2001). "Visual Culture and Black Masculinity". Wide Angle. Vol. 21, no. 4. The Johns Hopkins University Press. ISSN 0160-6840.
