= Untitled (How Does It Feel) =

2000 single by D'Angelo

Single by D'Angelo

from the album Voodoo
- B-side: "Me and Those Dreamin' Eyes of Mine"; "Everybody Loves the Sunshine"
- Released: January 10, 2000
- Recorded: 1999
- Studio: Electric Lady (New York)
- Genre: Neo soul
- Length: 7:10 (album version); 4:19 (radio edit)
- Label: Virgin; Cheeba Sound
- Songwriters: D'Angelo; Raphael Saadiq
- Producers: D'Angelo; Raphael Saadiq

D'Angelo singles chronology
| "Left & Right" (1999) | "Untitled (How Does It Feel)" (2000) | "Send It On" (2000) |

Music video
- "Untitled (How Does It Feel)" on YouTube

"Untitled (How Does It Feel)" is a song recorded by American singer, songwriter, and multi-instrumentalist D'Angelo for his second studio album Voodoo (2000). Written and produced by D'Angelo and Raphael Saadiq, the song was originally composed as a tribute to musician Prince, incorporating a vintage style and sound similar to that of Prince's early musical work. The song's lyrics concern a man's plea to his lover for sex. "Untitled (How Does It Feel)" was released as the third single from Voodoo on January 10, 2000, by Virgin Records.

The song received generally favorable reviews from music critics and it earned D'Angelo a number of awards. "Untitled (How Does It Feel)" also earned notice for its controversial music video. Directed by Paul Hunter and Dominique Trenier, the video appears as one shot of a muscular D'Angelo in the nude and lip-synching to the track. While initial reaction from viewers was divided with praise for its sexuality and accusations of sexual objectification, the video received considerable airplay on music video networks such as MTV and BET, and it helped increase mainstream notice of D'Angelo and Voodoo.

The music video for "Untitled (How Does It Feel)" had a considerable impact on D'Angelo's recording career, as it helped engender an image of him as a sex icon to a younger generation of fans. However, his discontent with this image led to his period of absence from the music scene following the conclusion of the supporting tour for Voodoo. The song won a Grammy Award for Best Male R&B Vocal Performance at the 43rd Grammy Awards in 2001. Rolling Stone magazine named "Untitled (How Does It Feel)" the fourth best single of 2000. The magazine later named it the fifty-first best song of the 2000s. The song's music video inspired later videos by Panic! at the Disco and Jason Derulo.

== Background and recording ==
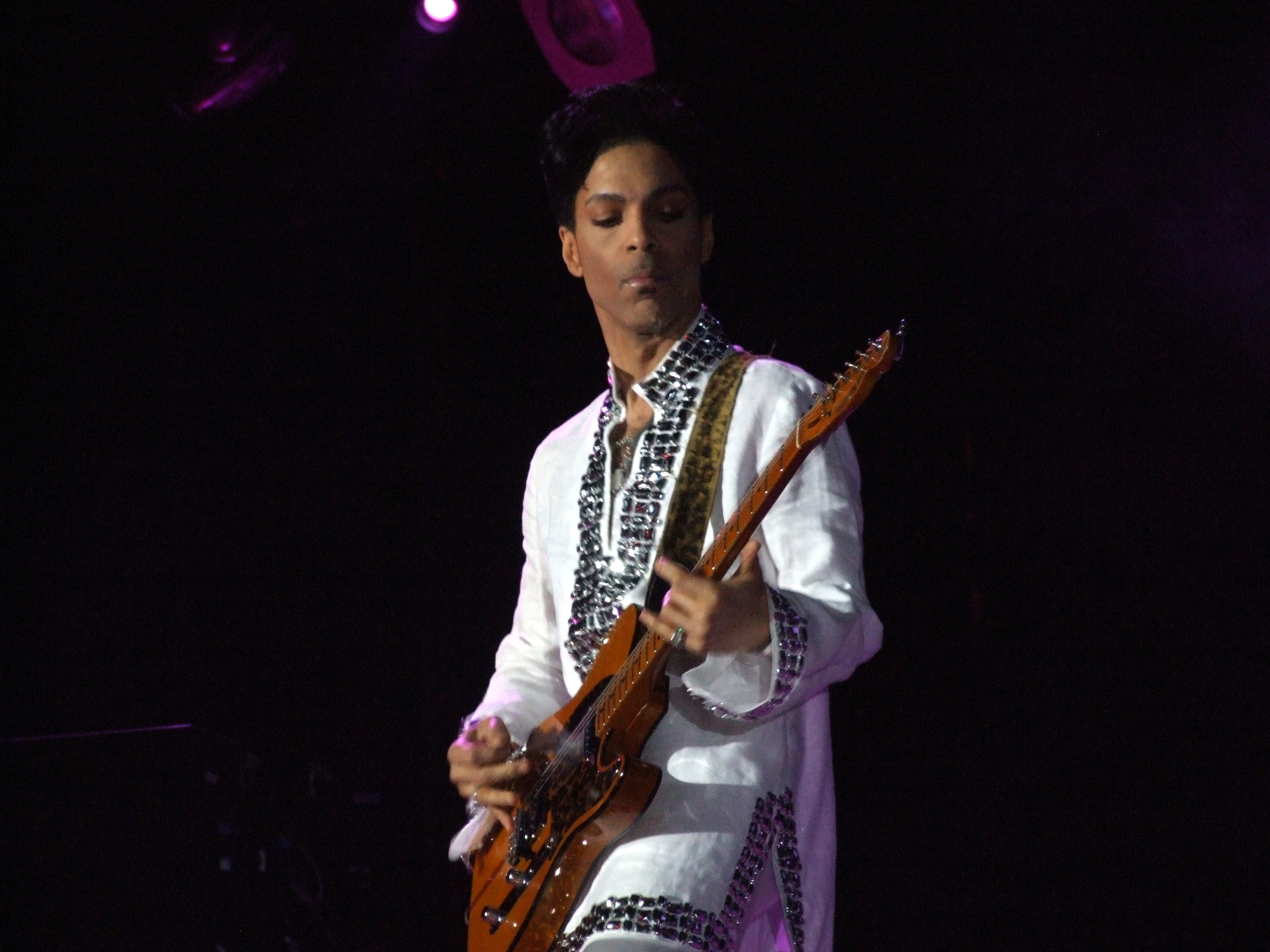
Prince (pictured in 2008), the song's original source of inspiration

"Untitled (How Does It Feel)" was originally intended as a tribute to influential musician Prince. The song evokes Prince's earlier work, in particular his balladry, from his Controversy period, as well as his musical style and falsetto vocal technique. As an homage to the musician, Voodoo producer Ahmir "Questlove" Thompson described the song as "finding the line between parody and honesty ... In an era of 'the cover song', redoing a Prince song was taboo. This is the second best thing". Production of the song was handled by D'Angelo and fellow neo soul musician Raphael Saadiq, who also contributed with bass and musical arrangements during recording in 1999. The session took place at Electric Lady Studios, the recording studio originally built by influential rock musician Jimi Hendrix.

== Composition ==
=== Musical structure ===
"Untitled (How Does It Feel)" follows a six eight signature, while drum pattern, bass line, guitar and melodic phrasing feature traditional arrangements. Raphael Saadiq's electric guitar interplay throughout the song is reminiscent of the guitar style of Jimi Hendrix, as well as the "Maggot Brain" sound featured on the early work of Funkadelic. The song features a drum pattern with a uniform dynamic, which gives the impression of a live drummer playing in accordance to the sound of a drum machine. Overdubbing of D'Angelo's vocals, a contemporary R&B recording technique prominently used on the rest of Voodoo, was implemented a number of times during production to provide the sound of a choir singing harmonies during the choruses, all of which are sung by D'Angelo.

The song begins with D'Angelo playing off-beat, cross-snare clicks on the two and four beat with a messy kick. Music critic Steve McPherson noted that its first two measures sound "like a disaster", contrasting its solid groove. While most musical compositions rely on tension and release, which can be produced by factors such as soft verses and loud choruses, gradual buildup, subtle tension within verses or over the course of the bridge, or harmonic tension in chords that provides space for improvisation, D'Angelo's arrangements subdivide the tension into each moment of the song. According to McPherson, this results in "no linear way to measure how far off things slide before they pull themselves back ... can't be measured in beats or fractions of beats in a meaningful way. For lack of a less clichéd word, it's entirely 'feel'". Similar to most of the song's album, Voodoo, "Untitled (How Does It Feel)" has this syncopation style as its center. D'Angelo's casual vocal style follows the same concept, applying it to melody, harmony, and phrasing, and is accompanied by falsetto climbs and skittery phrasing similar to Prince's singing.

Sample of the second verse and chorus

Prior to the final chorus section, "Untitled (How Does It Feel)" features a song-spanning dynamic after the bridge and guitar break that is accompanied by minor Rhodes piano and guitar chords, while the multi-tracked vocals are implemented as background whispers. Arrangements for the song are stripped back for an emphasis on vocals, leading to an enormous choral climax accompanied by overdriven electric guitar. On the song's final chorus section, critic Steve McPherson wrote "after it hits a peak, it keeps rising, the chorus of voices fizzing into overdrive and the whole track gradually succumbing to a wash of reverb". The song is cut off in the middle of its culmination, ending with the line "How does it fee-".

=== Lyrics and theme ===
Co-written by D'Angelo and producer Raphael Saadiq, "Untitled (How Does It Feel)" features sexually-explicit lyrics that follow and narrate a man's plea to his love interest for sex, as demonstrated in the song's second verse: "Love to make you wet / In between your thighs, cause / I love when it comes inside of you / I get so excited when I'm around you, baby". Music critic Andy Peterson described the lyrics as "not–so–subtle", citing the line "Baby close the door / Listen girl, I have something I wanna show you / I wish you’d open up cause I wanna take the walls down with you" as an example. Music journalist Greg Levine cited its lyrics as "the generic pop lyrics", while also noting the similarity the lyrics have to those of other classic soul ballads, stating "Each line seems to be directly lifted from Marvin Gaye, Prince, or Curtis Mayfield." Levine elaborated on the lyrical theme of the song:

Perhaps this is why the song is called 'Untitled'. Either as homage or ironic postmodern appropriation, D'Angelo is drawing attention to the fact that he has been influenced by the past masters of his music. It seems that for him the specific words of the lyric don't actually matter as long as the appropriate attitude is conveyed. Rather than spend days struggling to come up with a completely new combination of words to deal with a subject that has been dealt with so many times so well—words, that is, which don't sound either clichéd or laboured and awkward—D'Angelo chose to use excerpts from his favourite songs.

== Release and reception ==
As the fourth single issued in promotion of D'Angelo's second studio album Voodoo, "Untitled (How Does It Feel)" featured release in the United Kingdom in 1999 through the EMI record label and in the United States on January 1, 2000, through Virgin Records. In 2000, a 12-inch vinyl release of the single was issued in the U.K. with distribution through EMI. The 12-inch single was released with cover artwork featuring an illustration of musician Jimi Hendrix and an upper caption reading "Electric Lady Studios", serving as an homage to the musician and the recording studio, which were both influential to D'Angelo during the production of Voodoo. "Untitled (How Does It Feel)" proved to be the greatest chart success of the album's five radio singles, as it peaked at number 25 on the Billboard Hot 100 and at number 2 on the Hot R&B/Hip-Hop Singles & Tracks chart. The single entered the Hot R&B/Hip-Hop Singles & Tracks on January 8, 2000, at number 65 and spent 22 consecutive weeks on the chart. On January 22, "Untitled (How Does It Feel)" entered the Hot 100 Singles at number 77 and spent 17 weeks on the chart.

The song was well received by music critics. Miles Marshall Lewis of The Village Voice commented on its Prince influence, stating "D's falsetto plays the "Do Me Baby"-era chocolate-seduction Prince role", while Mark Anthony Neal of PopMatters described the song as "simply the best Prince song since his Diamonds and Pearls days". Neal cited "Untitled (How Does It Feel)" as the best track featured on Voodoo, and praised D'Angelo's style, stating "arguably Prince has never sounded better channeled through D'Angelo." On the song, Andy Peterson of The GW Hatchet wrote that "D’Angelo does a great impression of old-school Prince, full of kinky keyboards, grinding guitars and not-so-subtle lyrics." In citing it one of the Greatest Make-Out Songs of All Time, Blender magazine wrote that D'Angelo "set the pace for bump 'n' grind in the Aughts. A high point for dippin' it low". Reveille Magazine's Steve McPherson called it "the best Prince song Prince never wrote" and cited the song's climb to its final chorus section as "the finest musical approximation of sexual climax since Serge Gainsbourg's 'Je T'Aime, Moi Non Plus'".

=== Accolades ===
In 2001, "Untitled (How Does It Feel)" won a Grammy Award for Best Male R&B Vocal Performance and was also nominated for Best R&B Song at the 43rd Grammy Awards ceremony. It was ranked number 12 on The Village Voice's 2000 Pazz & Jop critics' poll and number 4 on Rolling Stone's "End of Year Critics & Readers Poll" of the top singles of 2000. Blender ranked "Untitled (How Does It Feel)" number 454 on its list of the Top 500 Songs of the 80s–00s (2005), and Q included it on its list of the 1010 Songs You Must Own (2004). About.com writer Mark Edward Nero ranked it number 9 on his list of 20 Best R&B and Soul Songs of the 2000s decade. In its December 2009 issue, Rolling Stone ranked it number 51 on its list of the 100 Best Songs of the Decade. In September 2011, VH1 ranked "Untitled (How Does It Feel)" number 83 on its list of the 100 Greatest Songs of the '00s. In 2021, it was listed at No. 379 on Rolling Stone's "Top 500 Greatest Songs of All Time".

== Music video ==
=== Production ===
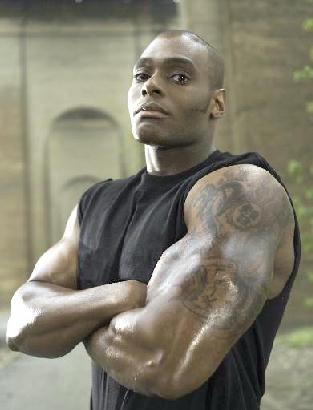
Mark Jenkins (2004) trained D'Angelo in preparation for the video.

The song's music video was directed and produced in one day at a soundstage in New York City by director Paul Hunter and Dominique Trenier, D'Angelo's manager at the time. The project was originally designed as a part of Trenier's promotional strategy to transform D'Angelo's image and public appeal. On the video's concept, Trenier stated, "the idea was, it would feel like one-on-one with whoever the woman was." D'Angelo, who had been under intense physical workout with personal trainer Mark Jenkins, was initially anxious to appear naked in the video upon hearing Trenier's proposal. In a 2008 interview for Spin, Jenkins discussed D'Angelo's reluctance at the time to the idea for the video, stating "You've got to realize, he'd never looked like that before in his life. To somebody who was so introverted, and then, in a matter of three or four months, to be so ripped-everything was happening so quickly."

The video features a chiseled and muscular D'Angelo, wearing a small gold-chained crucifix necklace, lip-synching while filmed on a platform from the waist-up and appearing nude; he was wearing a pair of pajama bottoms during filming, which were not visible in the video as they were hung low away from the camera's view. Trenier later explained the idea of D'Angelo appearing alone, stating "We didn't want an on-screen love interest. We wanted him to be able to make contact with whoever was watching it one-on-one". Appearing as one shot (although Hunter says he merged two), the music video begins with the camera opening on the back of D'Angelo's head before rotating to the front and drawing back to a larger view of his upper torso, as he begins to lip-synch to the track, set to an all-black background. It continues with camera close-ups of sweat trickling from his tattooed arms, chiseled chest and abdominal muscles, while also flirting with a peak of his shadowed, muscular hip. The video leads to D'Angelo making emotional gestures as he lip-synchs to the choral climax and the end of the song.

=== Interpretations ===
We made this for the women.

— Paul Hunter, the video's director

Music writers offered various interpretations of the video's style and concept. David Peisner of Spin wrote of the close-ups featured in the music video, "As the camera sucks him in, it feels intimate and intrusive, revealing and voyeuristic". Music critic Jim Farber commented that D'Angelo's torso "sways in grinding rhythm, tensing and releasing as his mouth curls in pleasure and his eyebrows narrow to measure an ecstatic contraction", while claiming that the video has "nothing but close-ups of D'Angelo's buff body on the apparent receiving end of one of life's great payoffs". In his essay "'Untitled': D'Angelo and the Visualization of the Black Male Body" for his 1999 Wide Angle journal, journalist Keith M. Harris interprets the video to be a portrayal of D'Angelo's "discursive play with masculinity and blackness". In his review of D'Angelo's Voodoo, Mark Anthony Neal of PopMatters wrote of the video in contrast to most music videos in R&B and hip hop at the time, stating "One could call the video for 'Untitled (How Does it Feel)' narcissistic, but in an era when most R&B videos are nothing but 'bling, bling' and booty, D'Angelo's bare naked torso was refreshing". On the video's camera range and angle, Stephen Hill, a senior vice president for BET, had stated "It stopped just north of the line where, you know, we would have had issues". A 2008 press release for D'Angelo described the music video as "featuring D'Angelo as a shirtless Adonis that catapulted him into the stratosphere and firmly cemented his place as the reigning King of Soul."

=== Viewer reaction ===
D'Angelo's nude image in the video caused controversy.

The music video gained a significant amount of airplay on the BET and MTV networks, as it increased mainstream notice and appeal of D'Angelo upon the release of Voodoo in January 2000. Viewer response to the "Untitled (How Does It Feel)" music video was largely divided along sexual lines, as female viewers generally expressed favor to the video. Additionally, D'Angelo's video appearance, including a notable amount of sweating around his abdomen, contributed to rumors of him receiving oral sex in the video. For an April 2000 article for Vibe, Questlove interviewed D'Angelo and asked him "Are you getting head in that video?", after which D'Angelo responded by laughing. Questlove then asked "So you're not going to answer that?", and D'Angelo responded, "No". In her response to the video, television personality Star Jones said that, "D'Angelo is singing about being intimate with a woman that he loves, and it's just basic voice and body, and when you're in an intimate situation with a man, that's really all that's there — the voice and the body and the light hitting the body in a way that makes you know that this is your man". Danyel Smith, editor for Time Inc. at the time, said "It's so sexy. It's about time that girls had something luscious to look at while they're listening to a song. For years, men have been treated to breasts and butts along with their favorite songs, and women have had to just sit there and endure." In an interview for The New York Times, Smith also said that she had encountered an appreciative reaction among women to the adult sexuality of the music video. She continued, recalling her experience at a salon where the video was viewed, stating:

Last week, I was at the hair salon, which is always a bustle of activity, people hollering for hair dye ... BET and MTV are on all day long with no one paying too much attention, but when that video came on, you could've heard a bobby pin drop. All the women just watched in silence, and when the video was over, there was a collective sigh of 'Oh my God! He is beautiful!'

Despite general favor from female viewers' perspective, reaction from most male viewers was negative. The music video was presented to a crowd during a promotional party at the Chelsea nightclub Centro-Fly, thrown in celebration of Voodoo's January 2000 release. According to a New York Times correspondent, one female viewer at the party "recalled sitting at home, staring at the video, while her boyfriend snapped, 'Turn the channel — I don't want to see that gay stuff'". D'Angelo made an appearance at the WQHT Hot 97 studio as the DJ's Angie Martinez and Funkmaster Flex fielded calls from listeners about the video. Tracy Cloherty, program director for the radio station at the time, later commented on the divided reaction to the music video in an interview for The New York Times in 2000, stating "Of course, most of the women loved it. Some of the men said things like: 'We don't wanna see that kind of stuff. Why do we have to look at that?' Men definitely seem to be threatened by male nudity". Some viewers and music writers have attributed the male discomfort of the video to fear of male sexual objectification and homophobia. In a 2000 phone interview for The New York Times, D'Angelo maintained a neutral attitude towards general viewer opinion of the video, stating "With men, if there's any negative reaction, I'm not really going to get an honest feedback ... women love it, most definitely. But for me personally, the response I've got from both men and women has been pretty cool".

=== Critical response ===
Critical opinion of the music video was generally favorable. Entertainment Weekly's columnist Jim Farber gave the music video an A rating, and called the close-ups of D'Angelo's physique a "measure of the video's smarm-free joy that even though the camera puts the viewer in the pleasure-giving position, we feel in no way manipulated or debased". Farber also lauded the video's depiction of sexuality, stating "it feels like a privilege to be part of such a comfortable act of carnality. Was it good for you, too?". A columnist for Billboard magazine shared a similar sentiment about the video, writing that "it's pure sexuality. D'Angelo, muscularly cut and glistening, is shot from the hips up, naked, with just enough shown to prompt a slow burning desire in most any woman who sees it. The video alone could make the song one of the biggest of the coming year". However, David Thigpen of Time magazine criticized the vanity of the video, stating "It's a good song, but I thought he was preening pretty heavily in the video". Thigpen also compared it to the music video for singer-songwriter Alanis Morissette's "Thank U" (1998), which features Morissette appearing nude, and stated "Nakedness is usually an expression of vulnerability — that was the point of the Alanis Morissette video. But in this case, it's really about power, an in-your-face form of masculinity". Douglas Century of The New York Times called it "the most controversial music video to air in years", and favored the video's unconventional concept, writing that "'Untitled' breaks a long-established pattern in hip-hop and R&B videos in which male artists are often dressed in roughneck gear — baggy jeans, Timberland boots and baseball caps — surrounded by shimmying women in thong bikinis".

On September 7, 2000, the video earned four VMA nominations at the 2000 MTV Video Music Awards, which included MTV Video Music Award for Video of the Year, Best Male Video, Best R&B Video, and Best Direction. In 2001, the video was ranked number 44 on VH1's list of the 100 Greatest Videos. The website UGO later selected it for its list of the Top 50 Sexiest Music Videos. The digital television MTV Base named "Untitled (How Does It Feel)" number 18 on its list of the Top 100 Greatest Music Videos Ever. In selecting the video for its list of the 100 Awesome Music Videos, Pitchfork Media staff reviewer Amy Phillips wrote of the music video, stating "Every time a man that fine gets naked on TV, we're one step closer to world peace." In 2018, Billboard critics ranked it 3rd among the "greatest music videos of the 21st century."

=== Legacy ===
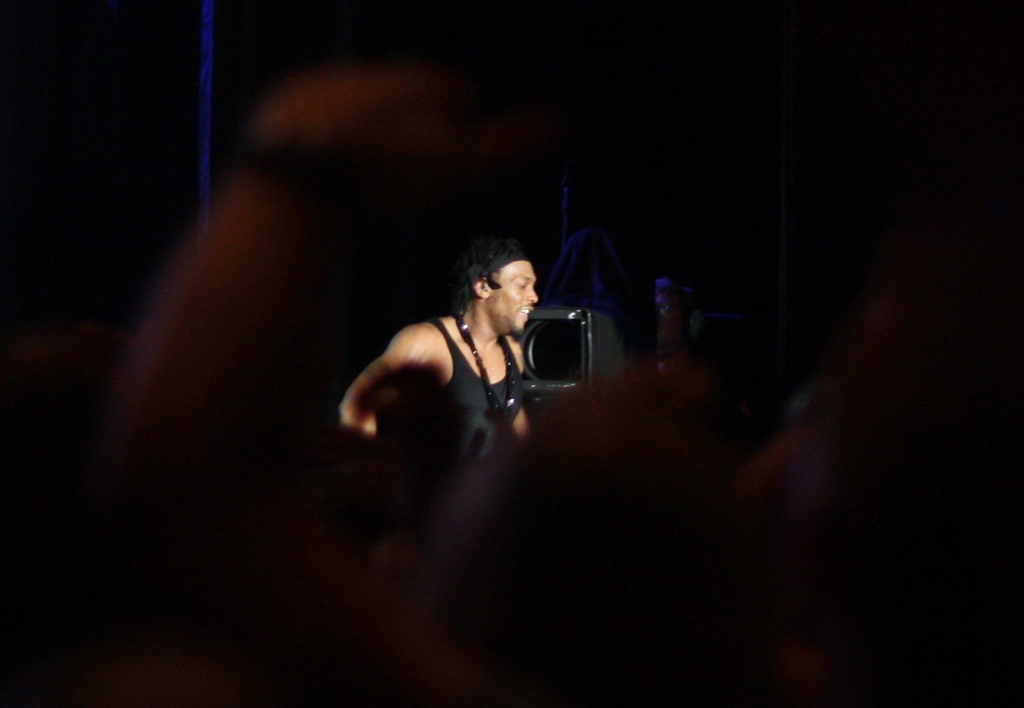
D'Angelo in 2012

The success of the video proved to contribute significantly to the album's commercial performance, as Voodoo had initially struggled to gain single-oriented success prior to the video. The commercial impact of the video and its heavy rotation on music video networks, however, led to D'Angelo's building image as a sex icon to a younger generation of music fans. Despite the publicity surrounding Voodoo being escalated by the video's appeal, the appeal of the album was almost overshadowed, commercially, by the video. The video's success also lead to mounting frustrations during the supporting tour for Voodoo, during which female fans and audience members would yell out for D'Angelo to take his clothes off on stage. Dominique Trenier, who served as D'Angelo's manager from 1996 to 2005, later explained his disappointment of the music video's effect on D'Angelo, stating "to this day, in the general populace's memory, he's the naked dude".

Many of D'Angelo's peers have noted the success of the "Untitled (How Does It Feel)" music video as a contributing factor to his period of absence from the music scene and solo work, as well as his legal controversies and drinking issues following the tour. A columnist for SoulBounce.com has cited the video as the "jump-the-shark moment" for D'Angelo, and stated "It was so provocative and polarizing that no one could recover from it, least of all him". Ahmir "Questlove" Thompson, who served as producer for Voodoo and musical director for "The Voodoo Tour", discussed the music video's impact on D'Angelo in a 2003 interview with music journalist Touré, stating "he wants to get fat. He doesn’t want his braider braiding every nook and cranny of his hair. He doesn’t wanna have to have ripples in his stomach. He doesn’t want the pressure of being 'Untitled' the video". Questlove ended by stating "Had he known what the repercussions of 'Untitled' would've been, I don’t think he would've done it".

Panic! at the Disco's music video for "Girls / Girls / Boys" (2013) recreated "Untitled (How Does It Feel)" shot-for-shot. Panic! at the Disco's Brendon Urie said "'Girls / Girls / Boys' is such a racy song that it immediately made me think of one of the sexiest videos of all time, which also happens to be one of my favorites. Doing an homage to D’Angelo’s classic video seemed like a perfect fit." In February 2016, singer Jason Derulo released the video for his song "Naked". It features his naked torso reminiscent of D'Angelo's appearance in "Untitled (How Does It Feel)".

== Track listings and formats ==
CD Maxi single

1. "Untitled (How Does It Feel)" (Radio Edit) – 4:22
2. "Untitled (How Does It Feel)" (Album Version) – 7:13
3. "Untitled (How Does It Feel)" (Call Out Hook) – 0:13

Promo 12" vinyl

1. "Untitled (How Does It Feel)" – 4:22
2. "Me and Those Dreamin' Eyes of Mine" (Funk Squad Mix) – 4:51
  - Remixed by Erick Sermon
  - Contains a sample of "I Used to Love H.E.R." by Common
3. "Everybody Loves the Sunshine" – 3:19
  - Written by Roy Ayers

== Personnel ==
Credits adapted from album booklet liner notes.

- Recorded by Russell "The Dragon" Elevado
- Mixed by D'Angelo and Russell "The Dragon" Elevado
- Produced by D'Angelo and Raphael Saadiq
- Assistant engineer: Steve Mandel
- Recorded and mixed at Electric Lady Studios, New York
- Mastered by Tom Coyne at Sterling Sound, New York
- All vocals performed by D'Angelo
- Vocal arrangement by D'Angelo
- Musical arrangement: D'Angelo and Raphael Saadiq
- Bass and guitar: Raphael Saadiq (lead) and Spanky Alford (Rhythm)
- All other instruments: D'Angelo

== Charts ==
=== Weekly charts ===
2000 weekly chart performance for "Untitled (How Does It Feel)"
| Chart | Peak position |
|---|---|
| Netherlands (Dutch Top 40) | 38 |
| Netherlands (Single Top 100) | 78 |
| US Billboard Hot 100 | 25 |
| US Adult R&B Songs (Billboard) | 2 |
| US Hot R&B/Hip-Hop Songs (Billboard) | 2 |

2025 weekly chart performance for "Untitled (How Does It Feel)"
| Chart (2025) | Peak position |
|---|---|
| Japan Hot Overseas (Billboard Japan) | 14 |

=== Year-end charts ===
2000 year-end chart performance for "Untitled (How Does It Feel)"
| Chart | Position |
|---|---|
| US Hot R&B/Hip-Hop Songs (Billboard) | 21 |

== Certifications ==
| Region | Certification | Certified units/sales |
|---|---|---|
| New Zealand (RMNZ) | Gold | 15,000^{‡} |
^{‡} Sales+streaming figures based on certification alone.

== Release history ==
Release dates and formats for "Untitled (How Does It Feel)"
| Region | Date | Format(s) | Label(s) | Ref. |
|---|---|---|---|---|
| United States | January 10, 2000 | Urban contemporary radio | Virgin; Cheeba Sound | |
| United States | January 11, 2000 | Urban adult contemporary radio | Virgin; Cheeba Sound | |

== See also ==
- One shot (music video)
- Sexuality in music videos

== Bibliography ==
- Maxine Block; Anna Herthe Rothe; Marjorie Dent Candee; Charles Moritz (2001). Current Biography Yearbook. Vol. 62, No. 5. The H.W. Wilson Company. ISBN 0-8242-1016-6.
- Saul Williams, D'Angelo (2000). Voodoo. (CD issue liner notes). Virgin Records America, Inc., 338 N. Foothill Road, Beverly Hills, CA 90210.
- Keith M. Harris (2001). "Wide Angle: Visual Culture and Black Masculinity". Wide Angle. 21 (4). The Johns Hopkins University Press. ISSN 0160-6840.
