= Send It On (D'Angelo song) =

Single by D'Angelo

from the album Voodoo
- B-side: "Send It On" (Album Version)
- Released: March 25, 2000
- Recorded: 1998
- Studio: Electric Lady Studios in New York
- Genre: R&B; soul; neo soul
- Length: 5:56 (album version); 4:39 (radio edit)
- Label: Virgin; EMI
- Songwriters: D'Angelo; Angie Stone; Luther Archer
- Producer: D'Angelo

D'Angelo singles chronology
"Untitled (How Does It Feel)" (2000)	"Send It On" (2000)	"Feel Like Makin' Love" (2000)

"Send It On" is a song by American R&B recording artist D'Angelo. It was released by Virgin Records on March 25, 2000, as a radio single in promotion of D'Angelo's second studio album Voodoo (2000). He wrote the song, with his brother Luther Archer and R&B singer Angie Stone, in 1998 at a recording studio in Virginia after the birth of his son. It was produced by D'Angelo at Electric Lady Studios in New York City.

As Voodoo's fourth single, "Send It On" peaked at number 33 on the Billboard R&B singles chart. The music video for the song featured footage from the album's supporting tour, "The Voodoo Tour".

== Background ==
Following the birth of his son, D'Angelo composed Voodoo's first song, "Send It On", in 1998 at a recording studio in Virginia, which started the album's recording. The song was produced by D'Angelo at Electric Lady Studios in New York City. Official credits for "Send It On" were attributed to R&B singer Angie Stone and D'Angelo's brother Luther Archer.

== Music and lyrics ==
The song is about honesty and faith in love, and features classic soul arrangements with trumpeter Roy Hargrove playing flugel horn. It features an interpolation of Kool & the Gang's "Sea of Tranquility" (1969). The song also has an arrangement of live guitar, bass and kick-drum, while D'Angelo's falsetto vocals contain spiritual highs and soulful lows. Mark Anthony Neal of PopMatters wrote that the song "evokes the late '70s sounds of Angela Bofill ('I Try')." Another critic described the song's horn-driven sound as reminiscent of the work of Sam Cooke.

On D'Angelo's vocal style on "Send It On", a Billboard magazine reviewer stated "In this musical setting, he sounds less like Prince (as he did on 'Untitled') and more like he's developing his own unique style-which bears the undeniable influence of Prince, Al Green, and Otis Redding." Entertainment Weekly's Matt Diehl called the song a "stately soul ballad like they just don't make anymore".

== Track listing ==
CD Maxi single

1. "Send It On" (Radio Edit) – 4:39
2. "Send It On" (Album Version) – 5:56
3. "Send It On" (Call Out Hook) – 0:12

== Personnel ==
Credits adapted from album booklet liner notes.

- Produced by D'Angelo
- All vocals performed by D'Angelo
- Vocal and musical arrangements by D'Angelo
- Guitar: C. Edward Alford
- Bass: Pino Palladino
- Drums: Ahmir Thompson
- Flugel horn and trumpet: Roy Hargrove
- All other instruments: D'Angelo

== Chart performance ==
Chart (2000)	Peak position
Netherlands (Dutch Top 40 Tipparade)	18
US Bubbling Under Hot 100 (Billboard)	20
US Hot R&B/Hip-Hop Songs (Billboard)	33
