= Devil's Pie =

Single by D'Angelo

from the album Voodoo and Belly (soundtrack)
- B-side: "Devil's Pie (Raw A Capella)"
- Released: October 31, 1998
- Recorded: 1998
- Studio: Electric Lady Studios, New York City
- Genre: Neo soul; funk; hip hop; psychedelic soul
- Length: 5:21
- Label: Virgin (SPRO-10019)
- Songwriters: Christopher Martin and D'Angelo
- Producers: D'Angelo, DJ Premier

D'Angelo singles chronology
"She's Always In My Hair" (1997)	"Devil's Pie" (1998)	"Break Ups 2 Make Ups" (1999)

"Devil's Pie" is a song by American R&B and neo soul musician D'Angelo, released October 31, 1998, on Virgin Records. It was issued as a promotional single for his second studio album, 2000's Voodoo. The song was composed by D'Angelo and hip hop producer DJ Premier of the group Gang Starr. "Devil's Pie" served as a departure for D'Angelo from the urban contemporary style of his previous commercially successful singles to the more experimental, "jam"-like sound that is predominant on Voodoo, as well as the use of sampling in his music. The song appeared on the soundtrack to the 1998 film Belly. DJ Premier originally made the track for Canibus but later offered it to D'Angelo after Canibus rejected the song.

== Background ==
A part of the musical collective Soulquarians, J Dilla aka Jay Dee served as a frequent collaborator of theirs. Although album tracks such as "Left & Right" and "Devil's Pie" help to bring this claim to light, Dilla himself was not officially credited for production. However, he contributed significantly to Voodoo's overall sound, specifically the rhythm and percussion.

== Composition ==
Produced by D'Angelo and hip hop producer DJ Premier, "Devil's Pie" is one of the more hip hop-oriented recordings on Voodoo, featuring extensive sampling and drum programming. Its distinctive sound consists of vintage P-Funk harmonies and contains several samples managed and programmed by Premier, including those from soul singer Teddy Pendergrass's 1977 "And If I Had", rapper Fat Joe's "Success", Pierre Henry's 1967 composition "Jericho Jerk", and "Interlude" by Wu-Tang member Raekwon.

"Devil's Pie"
One of the few tracks from Voodoo to have extensive sampling, with lyrics criticizing hip hop materialism.

The song is a sparse funk diatribe on the excess of money and materialism in hip hop, with a minor reference to Five Percenter philosophy ("85 are dumb and blind/A third of people compromise"). A Spin magazine columnist later cited "Devil's Pie" as the album's centerpiece, while also describing it as a "sweaty, head-nodding sermon against the evil seduction of hip-hop materialism." According to producer and drummer Questlove, the song was written to address the issues of "the money hungry jiggafied state of the world we're in, which you can't eat without dough, cream, ice, cheddar, and bread (the key ingredients) and how the devil will destroy those who will sell their souls to him." The song's first and second verse continue the overall theme of the dangers and excesses of hip hop, as D'Angelo's lyrics comment on the image of prison and death used by hip hop artists, as well as lack of artistic integrity and selling out. The theme of materialism in hip hop music and culture is introduced in the second rendition of the chorus:

Fuck the slice, we want the pie
Why ask why till we fry
Watch us all stand in line
For a slice of the devil's pie
Drugs and thugs, women and wine
Three or four at a time
Watch them all stand in line
For a slice of the devil's pie
This is how it be in this everlasting game

— D'Angelo, "Devil's Pie"

== Sample credits ==
Complete list of samples used for "Devil's Pie"; acquired from TheBreaks.com and Voodoo album liner notes.

- Contains a sample from "Success" performed by Fat Joe
- Contains a sample from "Interlude" performed by Raekwon
- Contains a sample from "Jericho Jerk" performed by Pierre Henry
- Contains a sample from "And If I Had" performed by Teddy Pendergrass
- Contains an excerpt from "Fakin' Jax" performed by INI
- Contains an excerpt from "Big Daddy Anthem" performed by Natruel

== Track listing ==
A-side

1. "Devil's Pie (DJ Premier's RAW Mix)" – 5:20
2. "Devil's Pie (DJ Premier's RAW Instrumental)" – 5:20

B-side

1. "Devil's Pie (Clean Version)" – 5:20
2. "Devil's Pie (Raw A Capella)" – 4:57

== Chart history ==
Year	Peak positions			
Year	Billboard Hot 100	Hot R&B/Hip-Hop Singles & Tracks	Hot 100 Airplay	Hot R&B/Hip-Hop Airplay
1998	—	—	—	69
"—" denotes a release that did not chart.

== Personnel ==
Credits adapted from album booklet liner notes.

- Produced by D'Angelo and DJ Premier
- Programming by DJ Premier
- All other instruments: D'Angelo
