= Ben Kane (music producer) =

American record producer

Ben Kane is a producer, engineer and mixer best known for his work with D'Angelo and his studio, Electric Garden.

== Career ==
Kane began his career working as an intern at Electric Lady Studios in 2003, eventually collaborating with fellow engineer Russell Elevado, which is where he first met D'Angelo. He would become one of the engineers for D'Angelo's Black Messiah, among a small group of contributors who worked on the album during the 15 year production process. Kane is also known for his work with Emily King, Chris Dave, CeCe Winans, Cultura Profética, and PJ Morton.

Kane has won three Grammy awards: Best R&B Album in 2016 for his work on Black Messiah, Best Gospel Album in 2018 for CeCe Winans' Let Them Fall in Love, and Best Gospel Album in 2021 for PJ Morton's Gospel According to PJ. He has been nominated for his work with Chris Dave and the Drumhedz, PJ Morton, and Emily King among others. Kane also won a Latin Grammy Award in 2020 for his work on Cultura Profética's Sobrevolando.

== Electric Garden ==
In March 2019, Kane co-founded his recording studio Electric Garden. The studio was built in a former bean-sprout factory in Brooklyn. Among the artists who have recorded at the studio since its inception are James Blake, H.E.R., and D'Angelo.

== Awards and nominations ==
=== Grammy Awards ===
| Year | Nominee / work | Award | Result | Reference |
|---|---|---|---|---|
| 2016 | Black Messiah | Best R&B Album | Won | |
| 2016 | "Really Love" | Record of the Year | Nominated | |
| 2018 | Let Them Fall in Love | Best Gospel Album | Won | |
| 2019 | Gumbo Unplugged | Best R&B Album | Nominated | |
| 2019 | Chris Dave and the Drumhedz | Best Progressive R&B Album | Nominated | |
| 2020 | Scenery | Best Engineered Album, Non-Classical | Nominated | |
| 2021 | Gospel According to PJ | Best Gospel Album | Won | |

=== Latin Grammy Awards ===
| Year | Nominee / work | Award | Result | Reference |
|---|---|---|---|---|
| 2020 | Sobrevolando | Best Alternative Music Album | Won | |
