= The Liberation Tour (Mary J. Blige and D'Angelo) =

2012–13 concert tour by Mary J. Blige and D'Angelo

- Tour by Mary J. Blige and D'Angelo
- Promotional poster for the tour
- Location: United States
- Associated album: My Life II... The Journey Continues (Act 1) and Black Messiah
- Start date: August 18, 2012
- End date: June 23, 2013
- No. of shows: 26
Mary J. Blige tour chronology
Music Saved My Life Tour (2010–11)	The Liberation Tour (2012–13)	The London Sessions Tour (2015)
D'Angelo tour chronology
Occupy Music Tour (2007)	The Liberation Tour (2012–13)	The Second Coming Tour (2015)

The Liberation Tour is a co-headlining concert tour by American recording artists, Mary J. Blige and D'Angelo. The North America tour supports Blige's tenth studio album, My Life II... The Journey Continues (Act 1) (2011) and D'Angelo's third studio album, Black Messiah (2014). The tour also features special guest Melanie Fiona.

== Background ==
On July 7, 2012, Mary J. Blige headlined the Essence Music Festival in New Orleans, during a brief interview with Rolling Stone she announced an upcoming 20 date summer tour with singer D'Angelo. Blige stated: "I felt like it would be refreshing and fun for people to see him and Mary J. Blige on the road together."

Tickets for four shows went on sale a few days after. During a four night stint at Caesars in Atlantic City (June 29, 30 & July 3, 4), Blige gave fans a peek of what was to come on the tour.

The tour will feature supporting act Melanie Fiona, and include Starshell appearing only at select cities. The Liberation Tour will extend its run in the summer of 2013 with R&B singer Bridget Kelly opening for D'Angelo and Blige. During the tour Vibe news announced a VIP contest giveaway to win two pair of tickets to any city of choice to see the tour. During the tour, VIP Nation also offered fans VIP Packages for the tour.

== Opening acts ==
- Melanie Fiona (2012)
- Starshell (2012 select dates)
- Bridget Kelly (2013)

== Set list ==
D'Angelo
1. "When I Die" (Instrumental intro)
2. "Left & Right"
3. "Devil's Pie"
4. "Chicken Grease" (contain excerpts from "Shadrach" and "Freddie's Dead")
5. "The Charade"
6. "Crusin'"
7. "Untitled (How Does It Feel)"
8. "Shi*t, Damn, Motherf*cker"
9. "Lady"
10. "Sugah Daddy"
11. "Another Life"
12. "Feel Like Makin' Love"
13. "One Mo' Gin"
14. "Brown Sugar"
Mary J. Blige
1. "Ain't Nobody"
2. "Family Affair"
3. "Feel Inside"
4. "Enough Cryin"
5. Medley: "Real Love" / "Outstanding" / "Love No Limit" (contain elements of "Risin' to the Top")
6. "Good Woman Down"
7. "Don't Mind"
8. "Why"
9. "Everything"
10. "Not Gon' Cry"
11. "Love A Woman"
12. "Mr. Wrong"
13. "I'm Going Down"
14. "Empty Prayers"
15. "My Life"
16. "No More Drama"
17. "Sweet Thing"
18. Medley: "Be Happy" / "You Bring Me Joy"
19. "Midnight Drive"
20. "Just Fine"
21. "Be Without You"

=== Additional notes ===
- Blige performed "Mary Jane (All Night Long)" only in Washington, D.C. replacing "Midnight Drive".
- "Why" was cut from Blige's setlist at some shows.
- D'Angelo's setlist was changed often for selected dates during the tour.
- "Brown Sugar" was his opening song at the Los Angeles show, and at select cities.

== Tour dates ==
List of 2012 U.S. concerts, showing date, city and venue
Date (2012)	City	Venue
August 18	Virginia Beach	Farm Bureau Live
August 19	Wantagh	Nikon at Jones Beach Theater
August 21	Boston	Bank of America Pavilion
August 23	Holmdel Township	PNC Bank Arts Center
August 24	Philadelphia	Mann Center
August 26	Washington, D.C.	Verizon Center
August 28	Atlanta	Chastain Park Amphitheater
August 30	Miami	American Airlines Arena
September 2	Houston	Toyota Center
September 7	Las Vegas	Pearl Concert Theater
September 8	Concord	Sleep Train Pavilion
September 9	Los Angeles	Gibson Amphitheatre
September 13	Chicago	United Center
September 14	Clarkston	DTE Energy Music Center
September 15	Charlotte	Verizon Wireless Amphitheatre

List of 2013 U.S. concerts, showing date, city and venue
Date (2013)	City	Venue
June 6	Hampton	Hampton Coliseum
June 7	Raleigh	PNC Arena
June 8	Columbia	Colonial Center
June 12	Shreveport	CenturyTel Center
June 14	Louisville	KFC Yum! Center
June 15	St. Louis	Chaifetz Arena
June 16	Kansas City	Sprint Center
June 19	Nashville	Nashville Municipal Auditorium
June 21	Indianapolis	Bankers Life Fieldhouse
June 22	Cleveland	Quicken Loans Arena
June 23	Rochester	Blue Cross Arena
