= The Second Coming Tour (D'Angelo) =

2015 concert tour by D'Angelo

- Tour by D'Angelo
- Associated album: Black Messiah
- Start date: February 7, 2015
- End date: November 6, 2015
- Legs: 4
- No. of shows: 27 in Europe; 27 in North America; 3 in Asia; 57 in total

D'Angelo concert chronology
- The Liberation Tour (2012); The Second Coming (2015)

The Second Coming Tour was the fifth and final concert tour by American R&B/soul singer D'Angelo. The tour was in support of his third studio album, Black Messiah, with performances of new songs and songs from his previous albums.

== Opening acts ==
- Raheem Bakaré (United Kingdom)
- Gary Clark, Jr. (Forest Hills, New York)
- Meg Mac (United States)
- Pascal Le Boeuf Trio (United States)

== Setlist ==
1. "Prayer"
2. "Betray My Heart" ^{1}
3. "1000 Deaths"
4. "Ain't That Easy"
5. "Vanguard Theme" (with Band Introduction)
6. "Feel Like Makin' Love"
7. "Really Love"
8. "One Mo'Gin"
9. "The Star of a Story"
10. "Alright"
11. "Brown Sugar"
12. "The Charade"
13. "Sugah Daddy"
14. "Lady"
15. "Back to the Future (Part I & II)"
16. "Left & Right"
17. "Chicken Grease"
18. "Till It's Done (Tutu)"
19. "Untitled (How Does It Feel)"

^{1} performed at select venues in Europe and North America.

== Band lineup ==
- Vocals, electric piano, guitar: D'Angelo
- Keyboards: Cleo "Pookie" Sample, Bobby Sparks II and Rodrick "Cliche" Simmons
- Guitar I: Jesse Johnson
- Guitar II: Isaiah Sharkey
- Bass guitar: Pino Palladino and Rocco Palladino
- Drums: Chris Dave, John Blackwell and Ahmir "Questlove" Thompson
- Percussion: Robert Lumzy
- Trumpet: Keyon Harrold
- Saxophone: Kenneth Whalum
- Background vocals: Kendra Foster, Charles Middleton, Jermaine Holmes, Joi Gilliam
- Guitar Tech - Timothy Wright

== Tour dates ==
Date	City	Country	Venue
North America
February 7, 2015	New York City	United States	Apollo Theater
Europe—Leg 1
February 11, 2015	Zürich	Switzerland	Kaufleuten
February 12, 2015	Neu-Isenburg	Germany	Hugenottenhalle
February 14, 2015	Berlin	Germany	Columbiahalle
February 16, 2015	Paris	France	Palais des congrès
February 17, 2015	Birmingham	United Kingdom	O_{2} Academy
February 18, 2015	Manchester	United Kingdom	O_{2} Apollo
February 20, 2015	London	United Kingdom	Hammersmith Apollo
February 21, 2015	London	United Kingdom	Hammersmith Apollo
February 24, 2015	Hamburg	Germany	Docks
February 25, 2015	Copenhagen	Denmark	Falkonersalen
February 27, 2015	Oslo	Norway	Sentrum Scene
February 28, 2015	Stockholm	Sweden	Annex
March 2, 2015	Amsterdam	Netherlands	Paradiso
March 3, 2015	Amsterdam	Netherlands	Paradiso
March 4, 2015	Utrecht	Netherlands	TivoliVredenburg
March 6, 2015	Cologne	Germany	Tanzbrunnen
March 7, 2015	Brussels	Belgium	Forest National
North America—Leg 1
March 11, 2015	New York City	United States	Best Buy Theater
June 7, 2015	Oakland	United States	Fox Theatre
June 8, 2015	Los Angeles	United States	Club Nokia
June 10, 2015	Denver	United States	Ogden Theatre
June 11, 2015	Kansas City	United States	Midland Theatre
June 13, 2015	Manchester	United States	Bonnaroo Music Festival
June 14, 2015	Atlanta	United States	The Tabernacle
June 16, 2015	Dallas	United States	The Bomb Factory
June 17, 2015	Houston	United States	Warehouse Live
June 20, 2015	Norfolk	United States	Norva Theatre
June 21, 2015	Forest Hills	United States	Forest Hills Stadium
June 23, 2015	Philadelphia	United States	Keswick Theatre
June 25, 2015	Washington, D.C.	United States	The Fillmore
June 27, 2015	Royal Oak	United States	Royal Oak Music Theatre
June 28, 2015	Sayerville	United States	Starland Ballroom
Europe—Leg 2
July 3, 2015	Gdynia	Poland	Open'er Festival
July 6, 2015	Rome	Italy	Parco della Musica
July 7, 2015	Milan	Italy	Estathé Market Sound
July 8, 2015	Montreux	Switzerland	Montreux Jazz Festival
July 10, 2015	Rotterdam	Netherlands	North Sea Jazz Festival
July 12, 2015	Liège	Belgium	Les Ardentes
July 13, 2015	London	United Kingdom	Roundhouse
July 15, 2015	Grimstad	Norway	Skral Festival
July 16, 2015	Oslo	Norway	Fjord Festival
July 17, 2015	Molde	Norway	Molde International Jazz Festival
North America & Japan—Leg 2
August 7, 2015	San Francisco	United States	Golden Gate Park
August 9, 2015	Portland	United States	Crystal Ballroom
August 10, 2015	Seattle	United States	The Showbox
August 15, 2015	Osaka	Japan	Maishima
August 16, 2015	Chiba	Japan	QVC Marine Field
August 18, 2015	Tokyo	Japan	Zepp Tokyo
August 21, 2015	Las Vegas	United States	The Chelsea
August 23, 2015	Los Angeles	United States	Exposition Park
September 5, 2015	Chicago	United States	Union Park
September 6, 2015	Minneapolis	United States	First Avenue
October 3, 2015	Atlanta	United States	Central Park
October 5, 2015	Orlando	United States	House of Blues
October 6, 2015	Miami Beach	United States	Jackie Gleason Theater
November 6, 2015	Austin	United States	Auditorium Shores
