= Coolaid =

Studio album by Snoop Dogg
- Released: July 1, 2016
- Recorded: 2015–16
- Studios: Doggystyle Studio Records (Diamond Bar, California)
- Genres: West Coast hip-hop; gangsta rap
- Length: 77:09
- Labels: Doggystyle; eOne
- Producers: Snoop Dogg (also exec.); Avenue Beatz; Bongo; Cardo; Cubeatz; Daz Dillinger; Dazmin; J Dilla; Jazze Pha; Just Blaze; KJ Conteh; Los; L-Finguz; Musicman Ty; Nottz; Powered By Raw B; Rockwilder; Shon Lawon; Snagz; Soopafly; Swizz Beatz; Timbaland

Snoop Dogg chronology
Cuzznz (2016)	Coolaid (2016)	Neva Left (2017)

Singles from Coolaid
- 1. "Kush Ups" Released: June 7, 2016; 2. "Point Seen Money Gone" Released: June 27, 2016

Coolaid is the fourteenth studio album by American rapper Snoop Dogg. It was released on July 1, 2016, by Doggystyle Records and eOne Music. Recording sessions for the album took place during 2015 to 2016 at the Doggystyle Studios Records, in Diamond Bar, California. The production on the album was handled by Snoop Dogg and other record producers, including Just Blaze, Swizz Beatz and Timbaland. Snoop Dogg also enlisted a variety of guest vocalists such as Too $hort, Swizz Beatz, Jeremih, Wiz Khalifa, Trick Trick, E-40, Jazze Pha, Suga Free and October London, among others.

The album title was revealed during the late-night talk show Jimmy Kimmel Live! on June 2, 2016. The lead single "Kush Ups" was released on June 7, 2016. It was followed by the single "Point Seen Money Gone", which was released on June 27, 2016. The album received positive reviews from music critics, who praised Snoop's technical rapping abilities and production choices.

== Background ==
On March 5, 2016, the Billboard magazine released an interview, in which a producer Just Blaze, said that he was working on the new Snoop project. In May 2016, Snoop Dogg announced that his album would be released during the summer of 2016.

== Release and promotion ==
After releasing a funk solo album, Snoop Dogg returned to rapping with the songs "Back Up" and "I'm from Long Beach". On April 20, 2016, Snoop released the song, called "Late Nights", which was released in commemoration of 4/20. The song was produced by Mike WiLL Made-It. On May 16, 2016, Snoop announced that the new album will be released on July 1, 2016. On June 2, 2016, Snoop Dogg announced the title to the album, Coolaid, while performing the songs "Fireworks" and "Legend" on Jimmy Kimmel Live!. The artwork created by frequent Snoop collaborator, Darryl "Joe Cool" Daniel and Justin Roach, was released on the same day; The cover art for Coolaid, harkens back to the illustrated stylings of his previous releases Doggystyle (1993) and Tha Last Meal (2000). Daniel, who was also Snoop Dogg's cousin and Doggystyle cover artist, died in July 2024. Coolaid was made available for streaming on Apple Music on June 29, 2016. The album was released for digital download on July 1, 2016. The physical version was released July 15, 2016.

== Singles ==
"Kush Ups" was released as the album's lead single on June 7, 2016. The song features guest vocals from Snoop's longtime collaborator Wiz Khalifa, with the production that was provided by KJ Conteh. The music video for the song was uploaded on Snoop's official website on June 7.

"Point Seen Money Gone" was released as the album's second single on June 27, 2016. The track was produced by Bongo.

=== Other songs ===
The track "Coolaid Man" was released as a countdown single, with the pre-order of the album on June 28, 2016. The track "Legend" was released as an instant grat with pre-orders on June 28, 2016. On June 29, 2016, the track "My Carz" was released as an instant grat with pre-orders. The production on this track is credited to J Dilla.

== Critical reception ==
Professional ratings
Aggregate scores
Source	Rating
Metacritic	68/100
Review scores
Source	Rating
AllMusic	3.5/5 stars
Consequence of Sound	B
The Guardian	3/5 stars
HipHopDX	3.9/5
XXL	3.5/5 stars
Exclaim!	6/10

Coolaid received positive reviews from critics. At Metacritic, which assigns a normalized rating out of 100 to reviews from critics, the album received an average score of 68, which indicates "generally favorable reviews", based on 8 reviews. Writing for Exclaim!, Calum Slingerland called it "a welcome return to the style the rapper helped pioneer".

== Commercial performance ==
In the United States of America "Coolaid" debuted at No. 40 on the Billboard 200, with 10,000 album-equivalent units, marking the 6th highest debut of the week. It was the 8th best-selling digital album of the week, selling 10,000 digital copies. In the United Kingdom, the album debuted at No. 122 on the UK Albums Chart and No. 30 on the UK Digital Albums. Coolaid was the 11th Snoop solo album to debut at top-ten on the UK R&B Chart, reached No. 9. In its 2nd week, Coolaid fell at number 198 on the Billboard 200, with 950 more copies sold.

== Track listing ==
Credits were adapted from the album's liner notes.

No.	Title	Writer(s)	Producer(s)	Length
1.	"Legend"	Calvin Broadus; Uforo Ebong; Adam "Bruza" Wright-Renellson	Bongo	3:47
2.	"Ten Toes Down"	Broadus; Carlos "Los" McSwain; Ermias Asghedom	Los	4:07
3.	"Don't Stop" (featuring Too Short)	Broadus; Todd Shaw; Dominick Lamb; Afrika Bambaataa; Arthur Baker; Ellis Williams; John Miller; John Robie; Robert Darrell Allen	Nottz; Soopafly	3:41
4.	"Super Crip"	Broadus; Justin Smith	Just Blaze	3:46
5.	"Coolaid Man"	Broadus; Kaseem Dean; Ronald LaTour; Kevin Gomringer; Timothy Gomringer; Brock Korsan	Cardo; Cubeatz	3:27
6.	"Let Me See Em Up" (featuring Swizz Beatz)	Broadus; Dean; Tyrone Johnson; Avery Chambliss	Swizz Beatz; Musicman Ty^{[a]}; Avenue Beatz^{[a]}	3:57
7.	"Point Seen Money Gone" (featuring Jeremih)	Broadus; Jeremih Felton; Ebong	Bongo	4:19
8.	"Oh Na Na" (featuring Wiz Khalifa)	Broadus; Cameron Thomaz; Delmar Arnaud; Priest Brooks; Ron Everette	Daz Dillinger; Dazmin; Soopafly^{[a]}	3:21
9.	"My Carz"	Broadus; Gary Webb; James Yancey	J Dilla	3:37
10.	"Two or More"	Broadus; Donald "Lil Half Dead" Smith; L.T. Hutton; Gino Soccio	Niggarachi; Shon Lawon	3:53
11.	"Affiliated" (featuring Trick-Trick)	Broadus; LaTour; Christian Mathis	Cardo; Soopafly	4:08
12.	"Feel About Snoop"	Broadus; Dana Stinson; Michael Jones	Rockwilder	2:52
13.	"Light It Up" (featuring Swizz Beatz)	Broadus; Dean; Johnson; Chambliss; Dale Frashuer; Gary DeCarlo; Paul Leka	Swizz Beatz; Musicman Ty^{[a]}; Avenue Beatz^{[a]}	4:32
14.	"Side Piece"	Broadus; Dean; Johnson; Chambliss; Kendra Foster	Swizz Beatz; Musicman Ty^{[a]}; Avenue Beatz^{[a]}	4:53
15.	"Kush Ups" (featuring Wiz Khalifa)	Broadus; Thomaz; Harry Wayne Casey; Richard Finch; Luther Campbell; Joy Byers; Leon Sylvers III; KJ Conteh	KJ Conteh	3:57
16.	"Double Tap" (featuring E-40 and Jazze Pha)	Broadus; Earl Stevens; Phalon Alexander; Robert Raya	Jazze Pha; Powered By Raw B^{[a]}	3:17
17.	"Got Those"	Broadus; Timothy Mosley; Adam "Bruza" Wright-Renellson	Timbaland	3:31
18.	"Let the Beat Drop (Celebrate)" (featuring Swizz Beatz)	Broadus; Dean; Naki "Snagz" Levy; Johnson	Swizz Beatz; Snagz^{[a]}; Musicman Ty^{[a]}	4:24
19.	"What If" (featuring Suga Free)	Broadus; Dejuan Walker; Leland "L-Finguz" Jackson	L-Finguz	3:27
20.	"Revolution" (featuring October London)	Broadus; Smith; Curtis Mayfield; Jared Samuel Eskrine	Just Blaze	4:12
Total length:				77:09

Notes

- ^{^[a]} signifies a co-producer
- "Don't Stop" contains a sample of "Planet Rock", performed by Afrika Bambaataa and Soulsonic Force.
- "Oh Na Na" contains a sample of "Dinner for Two", by Michael Cooper.
- "My Carz" contains samples of "Cars", performed by Gary Numan; and "Trucks", performed by J Dilla.
- "Two Or More" contains a sample of "Try it Out", performed by Gino Soccio.
- "Feel About Snoop" contains a sample of "I'm in Love", performed by Evelyn "Champagne" King.
- "Light It Up" contains a sample of "Na Na Hey Hey Kiss Him Goodbye", performed by Steam.
- "Kush Ups" contains samples of "I Wanna Rock", performed by Luke; and "That's the Way (I Like It)", performed by KC and the Sunshine Band.
- "Kush Ups" also contains samples of "(No No) I'm Losing You", by Aretha Franklin; and "Wish That I Could Talk To You", by The Sylvers.
- "Revolution" contains a sample of "I've Been Trying", performed by The Bar-Kays.

== Personnel ==
Performance

- Snoop Dogg – vocals (7, 9, 11, 16, lead on 1–6, 8, 10, 12–15, 17–20), recording engineer (20)
- Avenue Beatz – drum machine (6, 13–14)
- Bruza – additional background vocals (1, 17)
- Curt Chambers – guitar (10)
- Kendra Foster – additional vocals (14)
- L.T. Hutton – additional vocals (10)
- Tanya Jones – additional vocals (18)
- Shon Lawon – additional background vocals (5, 8), recording engineer (2, 4, 7–8, 10–12, 15–17, 19–20), audio mixing (2, 4–5, 7, 9–10, 15–17, 19)
- Lil' Half Dead – additional vocals (2, 10)
- Lea Lorien – additional vocals (13)
- Terrace Martin – talkbox (2)
- Musicman Ty – piano (13–14, 18), synth (6, 13–14), organ played by (6, 18), bass played by (6, 13–14, 18)
- October London – additional vocals (10, 20), recording engineer (20)
- Mekhi Phifer – intro voices performed by (2)
- Kelli Pyle – additional vocals (13)
- Snagz – drum machine (18)
- Adia Stinson – additional vocals (12)
- Frances Stinson – additional vocals (12)
- Swizz Beatz – additional lead vocals (5–6, 13, 18)

Additional technical

- Masaniai M. Ali – audio mixing (12)
- Garnett "G" Flynn – recording engineer (2–3), audio mixing (2)
- Stanley Greene – audio mixing (7)
- Ken "Duro" Ifill – audio mixing (6, 13–14, 18)
- Just Blaze – recording engineer (4), audio mixing (4, 20)
- Sean Klein – assistant recording engineer (4–5, 7, 13–14, 18)
- Migui Maloles – recording engineer (16)
- Travis "Shaggy" Marshall – recording engineer (6, 10, 16–17), audio mixing (17)
- Zeke Mishanec – recording engineer (4–7, 13–14, 18), assistant audio mixing (6, 14, 18)
- FredWreck Nassar – recording engineer (10)
- Zach Nichols – audio mixing (1)
- Kyle "Don" Resto – recording engineer (9)
- Soopafly – audio mixing (3, 8, 11)
- Frank Tatick – assistant recording engineer (6)
- Frank Vasquez – recording engineer (1, 7)
- Pat Viala – audio mixing (12)
- Christopher Walton – assistant recording engineer (9)
- Andrew Wright – audio mixing (4, 20)

== Charts ==
=== Weekly charts ===
Chart (2016)	Peak position
Australian Albums (ARIA)	51
Austrian Albums (Ö3 Austria)	67
Belgian Albums (Ultratop Flanders)	122
Belgian Albums (Ultratop Wallonia)	164
Brazilian Albums (ABPD)	27
Canadian Albums (Billboard)	37
Dutch Albums (Album Top 100)	82
French Albums (SNEP)	106
German Albums (Offizielle Top 100)	67
Swiss Albums (Schweizer Hitparade)	19
UK Albums (Official Charts)	122
UK R&B Albums (Official Charts)	9
US Billboard 200	40
US Top Album Sales (Billboard)	21
US Independent Albums (Billboard)	3
US Indie Store Album Sales (Billboard)	15
US Top R&B/Hip-Hop Albums (Billboard)	5

=== Year-end charts ===
Chart (2016)	Position
US Top R&B/Hip-Hop Albums (Billboard)	86

== Release history ==
Region	Date	Format	Label	Ref.
Various	July 1, 2016	Digital download	Doggystyle; eOne	
United States	July 15, 2016	CD	Doggystyle; eOne	

== See also ==
- 2016 in hip-hop
