= Chris Dave and the Drumhedz =

Studio album by Chris Dave and the Drumhedz
- Released: January 26, 2018
- Genre: Contemporary R&B
- Length: 58:56
- Label: Blue Note
- Producer: Chris Dave

Chris Dave and the Drumhedz is the debut self-titled studio album by Chris Dave and the Drumhedz. It was released on January 26, 2018, by Blue Note Records.

== Critical reception ==
Professional ratings
Aggregate scores
Source	Rating
Metacritic	77/100
Review scores
Source	Rating
AllMusic	4.5/5 stars
Pitchfork	6.2/10
Record Collector	4/5 stars
The Skinny	3/5 stars

Andy Kellman of AllMusic gave the album 4.5 stars out of 5 and praised the Drumhedz's performance of the album. Kellman compared the album quality to D'Angelo's Black Messiah (2014). Pitchfork gave the album a rating of 6.2.

== Track listing ==
Chris Dave and the Drumhedz
No.	Title	Writer(s)	Length
1.	"Rocks Crying"	Chris Dave; Cleo Sample	2:21
2.	"Universal Language"	Dave; Donald Rose; Leolin Dockins III; Robert Glasper; Shafiq Husayn; Sy Smith	3:39
3.	"Dat Feelin'" (featuring SiR)	Dave; Keyon Harrold	3:38
4.	"Black Hole" (featuring Anderson .Paak)	Dave; Brandon Paak Anderson; Harrold; Pino Palladino	4:33
5.	"2N1"	Dave; Andre Harris; Isaiah Sharkey; Palladino	1:02
6.	"Spread Her Wings" (featuring Bilal and Tweet)	Dave; Bilal Oliver; Charlene Keys; Charmelle Cofield; James Poyser; Sir Darryl Farris	5:23
7.	"Whatever"	Dave; Husayn; Tim Stewart	2:17
8.	"Sensitive Granite" (featuring Kendra Foster)	Dave; Foster; Palladino	3:41
9.	"Cosmic Intercourse" (featuring Stokley Williams)	Dave; S. Williams; Casey Benjamin	5:43
10.	"Atlanta, Texas" (featuring Goapele and Shafiq Husayn)	Dave; Goapele Mohlabene; Kebbi Williams; Husayn	3:44
11.	"Destiny N Stereo" (featuring Elzhi, Phonte Coleman and Eric Roberson)	Dave; Sample; Roberson; Jason Powers; Coleman	3:49
12.	"Clear View" (featuring Anderson .Paak and SiR)	Dave; Anderson; Fin Greenall; Palladino; Farris	6:26
13.	"Job Well Done" (featuring Anna Wise and SiR)	Dave; Wise; Michael Feingold; Farris	4:36
14.	"Lady Jane"	Alan James Pasqua	5:38
15.	"Trippy Tipsy"	Dave; Sharkey; Palladino	2:26
Total length:			58:56
