= The Second Coming Tour =

The Second Coming Tour may refer to:

- The Second Coming Tour (D'Angelo)
- The Second Coming Tour (Faith No More)
