= The Liberation Tour =

The Liberation Tour may refer to:

- The Liberation Tour (Christina Aguilera), 2018
- The Liberation Tour (Mary J. Blige and D'Angelo), 2012–2013
