= Occupy Music Tour =

2012 concert tour by D'Angelo

- Tour by D'Angelo
- Start date: January 26, 2012
- End date: February 10, 2012
- Legs: 1
- No. of shows: 2 in Sweden; 1 in Denmark; 1 in France; 2 in Netherlands; 2 in United Kingdom; 1 in Norway; 1 in Switzerland; 1 in Germany; 11 total

D'Angelo concert chronology
- The Voodoo World Tour (2000); Occupy Music Tour (2012); The Liberation Tour (2012)

The Occupy Music Tour was an 11-date concert tour across Europe by American R&B/soul singer D'Angelo that took place in January and February 2012. The tour both started and ended in Stockholm, Sweden at the Filadelfiakyrkan. It started on January 26, and ended with a final show on February 10. It was D'Angelo's first tour in twelve years since the Voodoo World Tour and his long absence from the public eye. The singer performed songs from his previous albums and premiered new songs, most of which appeared on his highly acclaimed 2014 album, Black Messiah.

== Background ==
In late October 2011, two concerts were scheduled for January 30 and 31, 2012 at club Paradiso in Amsterdam, the Netherlands. Tickets went on sale on November 5 and were sold out within 24 hours.

In an interview with Pitchfork Media, drummer ?uestlove spoke on the new album and up-coming concerts; he stated:

The album is pretty much 97% done. He's just finishing his lyrics now. But I know he must turn this record in like three days before Christmas and that his first show is in Europe, and that he's going to do a whole bunch. They even named it the Occupy Music Tour.

For the upcoming tour, he scheduled concerts in Europe from January 26 to early February in London, Paris, Stockholm, Oslo, Copenhagen, Amsterdam and Zürich. The band includes Pino Palladino, Chris "Daddy" Dave, Kendra Foster, Jermaine Holmes, Ray Angry, Jesse Johnson of The Time and others. He performed 4 new songs: "Sugah Daddy", "Ain't That Easy", "Another Life" and "The Charade". According to people that visited the concert, the new songs were well received.

== Opening acts ==
- Jean Grae (Paris)
- Furlan Felter (Amsterdam)

== Setlist ==
1. "Playa Playa"
2. "Feel Like Makin' Love"
3. "Ain't That Easy"
4. "Devil's Pie"
5. "Chicken Grease"
6. "The Line" (intro)
7. "The Root"
8. "The Charade"
9. "I've Been Watching You (Move Your Sexy Body)"
10. "Sh*t, Damn, Motherf*cker"
11. "Medley: "Jonz in My Bonz"/"Spanish Joint"
  - "Me and Those Dreamin' Eyes of Mine"/"Cruisin'"
  - "Higher"/"One Mo'Gin"/"Lady"
12. "Untitled (How Does It Feel)"
13. "Another Life"
14. "Sugah Daddy"
15. "Space Oddity"
16. "Brown Sugar"

== The band (D'Angelo and The Testimony) ==
- Vocals, electric piano, guitar: D'Angelo
- Keyboards: Ray Angry
- Guitar I: Jeff Lee Johnson
- Guitar I: Jesse Johnson
- Guitar II: Isaiah Sharkey
- Bass guitar: Pino Palladino
- Drums: Chris Dave
- Percussion: Robert Lumzy
- Background vocals: Jermaine Holmes, Kendra Foster, Charles Middleton

== Tour dates ==
Date	City	Country	Venue
Europe
January 26, 2012	Stockholm	Sweden	Filadelfiakyrkan
January 27, 2012	Copenhagen	Denmark	The Vega
January 29, 2012	Paris	France	Le Zenith
January 31, 2012	Amsterdam	Netherlands	Paradiso
February 2, 2012	Amsterdam	Netherlands	Paradiso
February 3, 2012	London	United Kingdom	O2 Academy Brixton
February 4, 2012	London	United Kingdom	O2 Academy Brixton
February 6, 2012	Oslo	Norway	Sentrum Scene
February 7, 2012	Zürich	Switzerland	Palais X-Tra
February 9, 2012	Hamburg	Germany	Alsterdorfer Sporthalle
February 10, 2012	Stockholm	Sweden	Filadelfiakyrkan

Cancellations and rescheduled shows

January 30, 2012	Amsterdam, Netherlands	Paradiso	Cancelled due to injury rescheduled to February 2, 2012.
