= Really Love =

Really Love may refer to:

- "Really Love" (D'Angelo song), a 2014 song by American singer D'Angelo
- "Really Love" (KSI song), a 2020 song by British rapper KSI
- Really Love (film), a 2020 romantic drama film by American director Angel Kristi Williams
