= Point Seen Money Gone =

Single by Snoop Dogg featuring Jeremih

from the album Coolaid
- Released: June 27, 2016
- Recorded: 2016
- Genre: West Coast hip hop; trap
- Length: 4:19
- Label: Doggystyle; eOne
- Songwriters: Calvin Broadus; Jeremih Felton; Uforo Ebong
- Producer: Bongo

Snoop Dogg singles chronology
"All the Way Up (Westside remix)" (2016)	"Point Seen Money Gone" (2016)	"Way Back" (2017)

Jeremih singles chronology
"All Eyez" (2016)	"Point Seen Money Gone" (2016)	"Do You Mind" (2016)

Music video
- "Point Seen Money Gone" on YouTube

"Point Seen Money Gone" is a song by American rapper Snoop Dogg. It was released for digital download on June 27, 2016 as the second single of his fourteenth studio album Coolaid, with the record labels; Doggystyle Records and eOne Music. It was produced by Bongo and features guest vocal from American recording artist Jeremih.

== Music video ==
On July 5, 2016 Snoop uploaded the music video for "Point Seen Money Gone" on his YouTube and Vevo account. The music video was directed by Benny Bloom and produced by John Lathan. The video takes place in a strip club in Las Vegas.

== Track listing ==
- Download digital
1. Point Seen Money Gone (featuring Jeremih) — 4:19

== Release history ==
Region	Date	Format	Label	Ref.
United States	June 27, 2016	Digital download; streaming	Doggystyle; eOne	
