= SoHo Karen incident =

Bullying incident

SoHo Karen Incident
- Date: December 26, 2020; 5 years ago
- Venue: Arlo Hotel SoHo
- Location: New York City, United States
- Type: Harassment (through physical abuse, psychological abuse, & verbal abuse)
- Participants: Miya Ponsetto
- Outcome: Arrested
- Injuries: 2
- Property damage: 1
- Suspects: Miya Ponsetto
- Accused: Racial profiling
- Convicted: Felony
- Charges: Larceny, child abuse
- Verdict: 2 years probation
- Convictions: Assault

The SoHo Karen Incident occurred on December 26, 2020, when 22-year-old Miya Ponsetto harassed a 14-year-old Black teenager in the lobby of the Arlo Hotel SoHo in the SoHo neighborhood of Manhattan in New York City.

The incident was captured on video with widespread outrage on social media, celebrities, politicians, and others denouncing the incident. It has been described as an example of racial profiling.

== Incident ==
The video of the racial profiling incident, captured on camera by Keyon Harrold, the father of the victim, took place inside the lobby of the Arlo Hotel SoHo, where Ponsetto falsely accused the victim of taking her cellphone and demanding that he return it to her. Ponsetto then looked into the camera, screaming "I'm not letting him walk away with my phone". Security footage showed her tackling or grabbing the boy. The phone was later returned to Ponsetto by an Uber driver.

On January 8, 2021, Miya Ponsetto was interviewed by Gayle King on CBS This Morning, claiming that the incident was not racially motivated and that she did not believe it was a crime. Hours later, she was arrested during a traffic stop in Piru, California. Deputies had to forcibly remove her from her car.

== Aftermath ==
Later, Ponsetto accepted a plea deal, pleading guilty to a hate crime. She was given two years probation, and was forced to continue counseling, something which she had been receiving since she had been charged with drunk driving. In 2024 the hate crime charge was removed from her record and Ponsetto pleaded to second-degree aggravated harassment as part of her plea deal.
