= Fireworks (Snoop Dogg song) =

"Fireworks (or Light It Up)"

Song by Snoop Dogg
- Released: June 2, 2016
- Recorded: 2016
- Genre: Pop-rap; West coast hip hop
- Length: 4:31
- Label: Doggystyle; eOne
- Songwriter: Calvin Broadus
- Producer: Swizz Beatz

"Fireworks" or in album version Light It Up is a song by American rapper Snoop Dogg, released to promote his fourteenth studio album Coolaid, with the record labels Doggystyle Records and eOne Music. The song, produced by Swizz Beatz.

== Release and promotion ==
On June 2, 2016, Snoop Dogg announced the title of the album and performed the songs "Fireworks" and "Legend" on Jimmy Kimmel Live!.
