= LBC Movement presents Beach City =

Beach City

Mixtape by LBC Movement
- Released: November 5, 2015
- Recorded: 2015
- Genre: West Coast hip hop; gangsta rap
- Label: Doggystyle
- Producer: Snoop Dogg (also exec.); Scoop DeVille

Snoop Dogg chronology
Bush (2015)	Beach City (2015)	Cuzznz (2016)

LBC Movement presents Beach City (also known as Beach City) is a mixtape by American West Coast hip hop recording group formed by Snoop Dogg LBC Movement. It was released on November 5, 2015 via the DatPiff. The mixtape is hosted by DJ Drama.

== Track listing ==
No.	Title	Producer(s)	Length
1.	"Back Up" (performed by Snoop Dogg)	Scoop DeVille
2.	"The Movement (Ride On)" (performed by Willie Mammuth, Fade RR, SD The Emcee, Yung Zeke, Jooba Loc, Lil Moe, Yada, Ju Da Truth)
3.	"Smiling Faces" (performed by Snoop Dogg, 2OLDMEN)
4.	"Beach City" (performed by Snoop Dogg, Willie Mammuth, Beefy Bankz, Fade RR, SD The Emcee, Jooba Loc, Saggzilla, Sam I Am, Duce)
5.	"93, 94" (performed by SD The Emcee)
6.	"Turf I Bang" (performed by Soopafly & Snoop Dogg)
7.	"Bitch Niggaz" (performed by Jooba Loc)
8.	"Clarity" (performed by Beefy Bankz, Sagzilla & Niecy J)	Ce-ILLA
9.	"G Shit" (performed by Yung Zeke)
10.	"Powder On My Clothes" (performed by Snoop Dogg & Busta Rhymes)	Rick Rock
11.	"At the Beach" (performed by Willie Mammuth, Bo Roc, Saggzilla, Sam I Am, Jooba Loc)
12.	"Tell Me What You Want" (performed by Emission)
13.	"It's The Yakk" (performed by Willie Mammuth, Fade RR & D Knu)
14.	"Crip or Die" (performed by Snoop Dogg)
15.	"My Bad" (performed by Young Sagg & Snoop Dogg)
16.	"Eastside" (performed by Indian Blue)
17.	"No Way" (performed by Duce 2 Tha)
18.	"Love Me in A Special" (performed by Half Dead & Snoop Dogg)
19.	"Bad Bitch" (performed by Willie Mammuth, Fade RR & Juneo)
20.	"Have U Eva" (performed by Snoop Dogg & Daz Dillinger)	Dâm-funk
21.	"General Vet" (performed by Tray Deee)

- Mixed and Mastered by Dave Fore. Produced by James Massey.
