= Kush Ups =

Single by Snoop Dogg featuring Wiz Khalifa

from the album Coolaid
- Released: June 7, 2016
- Recorded: 2016
- Genre: Hip hop
- Length: 3:57
- Label: Doggystyle; eOne
- Songwriters: Calvin Broadus; Cameron Thomaz
- Producer: KJ Conteh

Snoop Dogg singles chronology
"Westside" (2016)	"Kush Ups" (2016)	"All the Way Up (Westside remix)" (2016)

Wiz Khalifa singles chronology
"Pull Up" (2016)	"Kush Ups" (2016)	"Sucker for Pain" (2016)

"Kush Ups" is a song by American rapper Snoop Dogg, and featuring Wiz Khalifa. It was released for digital download on June 7, 2016 as the first single of his studio album Coolaid, with the record labels; Doggystyle Records and eOne Music. It was produced by KJ Conteh.

== Production and composition ==
The song was written by Snoop Dogg, Wiz Khalifa and produced by KJ Conteh. The song contains a sample of "I Wanna Rock" by Luther Campbell from his album I Got Shit on My Mind.

== Music video ==
On June 7, 2016 Snoop uploaded the music video for "Kush Ups" on Snoop's official website. The music video was directed by Dan Folger. The video of the single was shot in black-and-white.

== Track listing ==
- Download digital
1. Kush Ups (featuring Wiz Khalifa) — 3:57

== Charts ==
=== Weekly charts ===
Chart (2016)	Peak position
France (SNEP)	199
US R&B/Hip-Hop Digital Songs (Billboard)	50
US Rap Digital Songs (Billboard)	30

== Release history ==
Region	Date	Format	Label	Ref.
United States	June 7, 2016	Digital download; streaming	Doggystyle; eOne	
