= Nataly Andria =

Malagasy-born French pop-soul singer (born 1985)

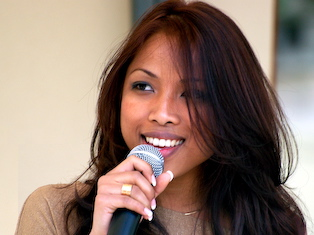
- Andria performing in Paris for MBS TV 2008

Background information
- Born: Nataly Haritiana Andrianaivoson; 3 February 1985 (age 41); Antsirabe, Madagascar,
- Genres: Pop, soul, electropop
- Occupations: Singer-songwriter, musician, actress
- Instruments: Vocals, guitar, bass guitar
- Years active: 2008–present
- Label: Be Live
- Spouse: Chris Dave (m. 2021)
- Website: iamnataly.com

Nataly Andria-Dave (born Nataly Haritiana Andrianaivoson, 3 February 1985), is a Malagasy-French, pop-soul singer. She was a finalist, from a thousand contestants, on the first local season of an American Idol-inspired TV show in Madagascar, called Pazzapa.

== Life and career ==
Andria was born in Antsirabe, Madagascar. Her mother is a descent from the royal family of King Andriandranandobe, and her father was, originally, a singer/guitar player, but went to work for the national Oil and Gas company, to provide a more stable family income.

As a youth, her father, who was the leader of rock n' blues band the "CCC guitars", taught her about jazz and blues music. She developed her skills on the guitar with two of her brothers, who founded the acclaimed band L.A Doudh, which won an award as the best alternative rock band in Madagascar in 1998. She learned various genres of music through her musical household.

Andria rose to fame by being the finalist among thousand contestants, in 2003, of the nationally broadcast TV Contest show Pazzapa. Her first single, in her mother tongue, "K'atao ahoana moa", released just right after the TV show, brought Andria to the position of a valuable and notable young artist of the nation.

Andria then moved to France and pursued a degree in Economics and Management at Université Paris Ouest Nanterre La Défense, with majoring in Finance and Banking. She is fluent in four languages: Malagasy, French, English and Spanish. She has been naturalized as a French citizen in 2015.

In 2008, she met the French DJ Sims of Now Futur, who produced her first EP Out of Stage.

In 2010, she went back to Madagascar for few months to be with her mother who was suffering from cancer. Most of her songs included in her EP Something New, released in 2013, were written and produced during that stay.

Andria left the indie record label Kulture Label right after the release of Something New and started to work with another indie record label named Be Live Records in 2014. Meanwhile, she multiplied collaborations with various artists from different backgrounds on different side projects, such as French DJ Ilo Bosco or her duet with Joel Rabesolo in the band "The GasyQuarians".

She released her single "Used 2" (feat. Ilo Bosco) on 7 September 2015. On 30 June 2016, Andria confirmed the new musical direction she chose, electro-soul music, with the release of her EP "Covered (The remix)". Thrilled to experience music in all forms, Andria started to spin some records as a DJ in some private parties in Europe during the whole year of 2016. There she launched a side project or alter ego, LAINGO, as a Deep House music producer and DJ. Andria explained that the alter ego will help to make a clear distinction between her career as a singer and her career as a DJ which she intended to develop as well.

She dropped her first single as the alter ego LAINGO on 30 December 2016 on SoundCloud and officially released it on 11 January 2017.

Meanwhile, Nataly Andria, is officially introduced in the Hall of fame of Divas of Madagascar, when she sang the national anthem of her birth country, for the President of the Republic of Madagascar, Hery Rajaonarimampianina, at the UNESCO headquarters, on 1 December 2016 at the donators for Madagascar Conference.

Following that, Andria represented her birth country Madagascar, performing at the closing ceremony of the 12th African Games in Rabat, Morocco, on 31 August 2019.

During the COVID-19 pandemic, in May 2020, she released a live album Live at Urban Café recorded in her home country, Madagascar 10 years prior. Andria has announced that the album was a full circle as she is planning to release new records under new musical direction.

== Personal life ==
Andria married Texas-born drummer Chris Dave during a home wedding ceremony in their house in Houston, Texas on the second week-end of January 2021. They have apparently been in a long-term relationship prior to the wedding according to Andria website although the time when they truly began dating has never been revealed so far.

They have a daughter, Avo Dave, born in December 2021.

== Philanthropy ==
At the age of 25 years she became the Goodwill Ambassador of NGO Vakan'ala. She used her fame to raise awareness of the necessity of saving and conserving the unique biodiversity heritage of Madagascar.

Malagasy by heart, she is most of all a citizen of the world. In 2014 Andria enrolled as a United Nations Volunteer and started to work with association Arpedac which aims at developing sustainable energy in Central Africa.

In 2020 she teamed up with Unicef Madagascar on a campaign for awareness on menstrual hygiene management during the pandemic.

== Awards ==
Andria made the global list of the Top 100 Most Influential People of African Descent (MIPAD) under 40 years old, in the year 2019, in the media & culture category.

== Discography ==
=== Singles ===
- 2003: "K'atao Ahoana moa"
- 2010: "Ready"
- 2015: "Used2"
- 2016: "MDGSKR" as LAINGO

=== Extended plays ===
- 2008: Out Of Stage
- 2013: Something New
- 2016: Covered (The Remix EP)
- 2020: Live at Urban Café

== Filmography ==
=== Films ===
Year	Film	Character	Director	Notes
2011	Sens Interdits	Nurse	Atika Belhachmi	Sens Interdits is a short film shot in Gentilly, France in 2010 and was selected in "9 fictions musicales" in 2011. The Original soundtracks of the short film includes song "Ready" by Nataly Andria.

=== Television/documentary ===
Year	TV show	Role	Notes
2003	Pazzapa	Herself	Season 1, all episodes. She was the finalist of the TV Contest aired on RTA TV in Madagascar.
2008	Lifestyle Mag	Herself	Short documentary and interview about her career aired on MBS TV in Madagascar.
2008	Pazzapa	Herself	Season 6, 1 episode, guest and mentor.
2009	Pazzapa	Herself	Season 7, 1 episode, guest/judge.
2012	Tantine Matin	Herself	Promoting Festival Cri des Femmes on the morning talk-show aired on TV channel TéléSud in France, Africa and West Indies.
2012	Dans ton monde	Herself	Short documentary and interview about her career aired on MCE TV in France.
2013	Something New	Herself	Vlogs showing the making-off of her extended play "Something New". Directed by Claire Joas-Karakoc. Available on her YouTube page.
2015	La Bande à Charly et Lulu	Herself	Co-host; "La Bande à Charly et Lulu" is a talk-show hosted by famous acclaimed French duet hosts "Charly et Lulu" airing on TV Sud 1ère in France and Africa.
2015	Tantine Matin	Herself	Co-host on the morning talk-show aired on TV channel TéléSud in France, Africa and West Indies.
