= How Late Do U Have 2BB4UR Absent? =

Album by Parliament-Funkadelic

Studio album by George Clinton and the P-Funk All-Stars
- Released: September 6, 2005
- Recorded: 1988–2004
- Genres: Funk, dance, hip hop, R&B, rock
- Length: 148:10
- Label: The C Kunspyruhzy
- Producer: George Clinton

George Clinton and the P-Funk All-Stars chronology
T.A.P.O.A.F.O.M. (1996)	How Late Do U Have 2BB4UR Absent? (2005)	George Clinton and His Gangsters of Love (2008)

Professional ratings
Review scores
Source	Rating
AllMusic	3.5/5 stars
Blender	4/5 stars
Robert Christgau	B+
Entertainment Weekly	C+
The Guardian	2/5 stars
The New York Times	(mixed)
Rolling Stone	2/5 stars
The San Diego Union-Tribune	3/4 stars
USA Today	3.5/4 stars
Washington Post	(favorable)

How Late Do U Have 2BB4UR Absent? (How Late Do You Have To Be Before You Are Absent?) is a double album by George Clinton & the P-Funk All-Stars, released September 6, 2005 on Clinton's label The C Kunspyruhzy. The album also featured release in France on Nocturne Records. It is their first album of new studio material since 1996's T.A.P.O.A.F.O.M. (The Awesome Power Of A Fully Operational Mothership), which was primarily due to a lengthy court battle over ownership of Clinton's recordings.

How Late Do U Have 2BB4UR Absent? features appearances by Prince and Jazze Pha, alongside members of Parliament-Funkadelic. The album is compiled from different sessions over the last decade and is presented as a taste of more new Parliament and Funkadelic material to come. Clinton cited it as "one of the best records we've ever done". Despite mixed criticism towards its indulgent style, How Late Do U Have 2BB4UR Absent? received generally positive reviews from music critics.

== Track listing ==
Disc 1
No.	Title	Performer	Length
1.	"Bounce 2 This"	Kendra Foster featuring P-Funk Allstars	6:33
2.	"Su, Su, Su"	P-Funk Allstars featuring Trey Lewd	5:56
3.	"Paradigm"	George Clinton featuring Prince	6:50
4.	"U Can Depend on Me"	Kendra Foster	7:06
5.	"U Ain't Runnin' Shit"	George Clinton	5:27
6.	"Inhale Slow"	P-Funk Allstars featuring Paul Hill	4:00
7.	"Because / Last Time Zone"	Funkadelic	4:14
8.	"Never Ending Love"	Funkadelic	5:06
9.	"Sexy Side of You"	George Clinton featuring FUNK-KIN aka Tim Shider, Nowell Haskins and Nate Shider	3:56
10.	"Saddest Day"	Belita Woods	6:01
11.	"I Can Dance"	P-Funk All Stars featuring Susy's Posse	15:22
12.	"I'll Be Sittin' Here"	George Clinton featuring Joi	5:31
Total length:			76:02

Disc 2
No.	Title	Performer	Length
1.	"Don't Dance Too Close"	Belita Woods	4:55
2.	"More Than Words Can Say (Live)"	Belita Woods featuring Parliament/Funkadelic	9:10
3.	"Butt-a-Butt"	Parliament	4:51
4.	"Something Stank"	Sativa	6:20
5.	"Our Secret"	P-Funk Allstars featuring Trey Lewd	5:02
6.	"Viagra"	Funkadelic	6:12
7.	"Gypsy Woman"	George Clinton	6:28
8.	"Whole Lotta Shakin'"	P-Funk Allstars featuring Bobby Womack	8:57
9.	"Goodnight Sweetheart, Goodnight"	Parliament	5:22
10.	"Whatchamacallit"	George Clinton	5:56
11.	"Trust In Yourself"	Kendra Foster featuring George Clinton	4:16
12.	"Booty"	Louis "Babbling" Kabbabie featuring P-Funk Allstars	4:39
Total length:			72:08 148:10

== Personnel ==
Credits for How Late Do U Have 2BB4UR Absent? adapted from Allmusic.

- Dallas Austin – producer, instrumentation
- Pedro Bell – artwork
- Barbarella Bishop – management
- Chris Bittner – instrumentation
- Steve Boyd – producer
- Sheila Brody – vocals
- Felicia Collins – instrumentation
- Gary "Mudbone" Cooper – vocals, instrumentation
- Lige Curry – instrumentation
- Raymond Davis – vocals
- Pete Deboer – assistant engineer
- Sue Dog – vocals
- Larry Ferguson – mixing
- Errol Lem – mastering
- Sandra Feva – vocals
- Amp Fiddler – instrumentation
- Paul Hill – vocals, producer
- Kendra Foster – vocals
- Joi Gilliam – vocals
- Michael Hampton – instrumentation
- Clarence "Fuzzy" Haskins – vocals
- Lili Haydn – instrumentation
- Archie Ivy – management
- Jazze Pha – vocals
- Robert "P-Nut" Johnson – vocals
- Joi – performer
- Louis Kabbabie – vocals
- Trey Lewd – vocals
- Pat Lewis – vocals
- Tracey Lewis – vocals, instrumentation
- Rob Manzoli – vocals, producer, instrumentation
- Eric McFadden – instrumentation
- Blackbyrd McKnight – instrumentation
- J.T. Money – vocals
- Jim Morgan – engineer
- Cordell Mosson – instrumentation
- Nate Oberman – engineer
- Clip Payne – vocals, producer, instrumentation
- Michael "Clip" Payne – producer
- Billy Preston – instrumentation
- Prince – vocals, instrumentation
- Jerome Rogers – instrumentation
- Ricky Rouse – instrumentation
- Sativa – performer
- Nowell Eugene Scott aka Nowell Eugene Haskins – instrumentation
- Gary Shider – vocals, producer
- Kevin Shider – vocals
- Tim Shider – instrumentation
- Calvin Simon – vocals
- Bob Smith – engineer
- Ronald Spearman – instrumentation
- RonKat Spearman – vocals
- Joe Spencer – engineer
- David Spradley – instrumentation
- Bob Stovern – layout design
- George Ware – management
- Vaughn Wilson – producer, engineer, instrumentation
- Colin Wolfe – instrumentation
- Belita Woods – vocals
- Bernie Worrell – instrumentation
- Gary Thomas Wright – producer, instrumentation, mixer
- Jim "Big Jim" Wright – vocals
- Ron Wright – instrumentation
- Dwayne "D-Cat" Cornelius – instrumentation
- Martin J. Andersen (credited as Martin Jepsen Anderson) – instrumentation
- Jesper Bunk (credited as Jasper Bunk) – instrumentation
