= I'm from Long Beach =

Single by Snoop Dogg
- Released: December 21, 2015
- Recorded: 2015
- Genre: West coast hip hop
- Length: 2:52
- Label: Doggystyle; S & L Music
- Songwriter: Calvin Broadus

Snoop Dogg singles chronology
"Back Up" (2015)	"I'm from Long Beach" (2015)	"Late Nights" (2016)

"I'm from Long Beach" is a song by American West Coast hip hop recording artist Snoop Dogg. It was released on December 21, 2015.

== Track listing ==
- Download digital
1. I'm from Long Beach (Explicit) — 2:52
