= Kendra Foster =

American Singer-Songwriter

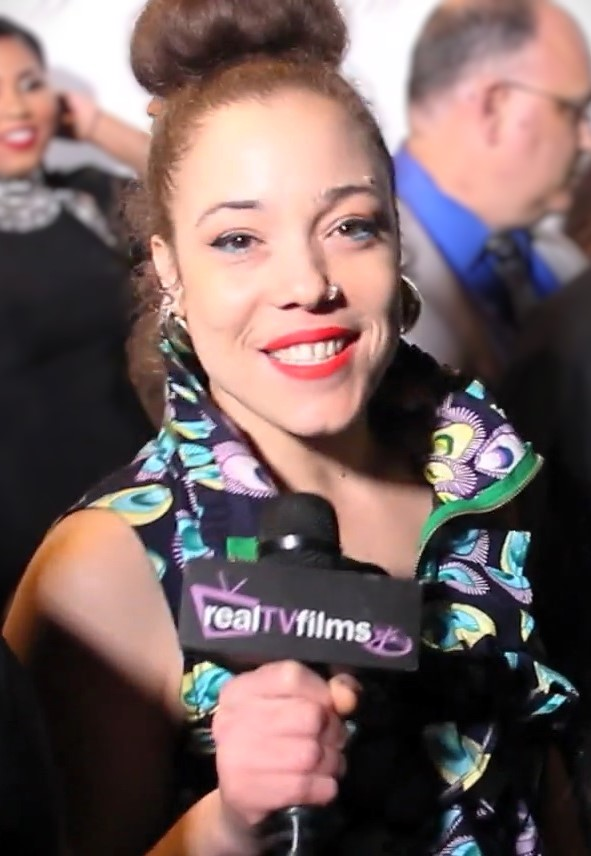
Foster on RealTVfilms in 2016

Kendra Marie Foster (born January 29, 1978) is an American singer-songwriter, session singer and backup vocalist. A two-time Grammy Award-winner, she has performed with artists including George Clinton, Parliament-Funkadelic, Snoop Dogg, Jay-Z, D'Angelo and The Vanguard.

== Early life ==
A woman of African American descent and a natural redhead, as a young girl in Tallahassee, Florida Foster began singing at her local Baptist church. She developed an interest in jazz in high school, and learned jazz standards performed by singers including Sarah Vaughan, Dinah Washington, Nancy Wilson, and Ella Fitzgerald. She attended Florida A&M University, where she became a member of Orchesis Contemporary Dance Theatre and took part in the Urban Bush Women Institute.

== Career ==
While in college Foster met George Clinton through a mutual friend who was working as an engineer at Clinton's recording studio. Foster recorded at the studio; after a year, Clinton noticed her and signed her to a production deal. She later toured as a member of Parliament-Funkadelic.

Foster released her debut album, Myriadmorphonicbiocorpomelodicrealityshapeshifter, in 2003 via a production deal with Clinton. Her self-titled second album, Kendra Foster, was released in 2016. Her songs "Step into the Light" and "Promise To Stay Here" (from her self-titled album) were featured on BET’s Being Mary Jane and STARZ’s Hightown series respectively.

In 2014, in addition to singing, she co-wrote eight out of 12 songs on D'Angelo's critically-acclaimed album, Black Messiah.

=== Collaborations ===
A credited songwriter on "A Warning for the Heart" on Sunshine Anderson's The Sun Shines Again and on Snoop Dogg's album Coolaid ("Side Piece"), Foster sang on Clinton's How Late Do U Have 2BB4UR Absent? album. ("U Can Depend On Me", "Bounce 2 This" and "Trust In Yourself"). She is featured on the song "Questions" by Domo Genesis on his self-titled debut studio album.

=== Discography and contributions ===
With Bootsy Collins

- Play with Bootsy (2002)

Kendra Foster

- Myriadmorphonicbiocorpomelodicrealityshapeshifter (2003)
- Kendra Foster (2016)
- Here (2023)
- Nothing is Impossible (feat. Keyon Harrold) (Single)(2023)

With George Clinton

- How Late Do U Have 2BB4UR Absent? (2005)
- George Clinton and His Gangsters of Love (2008)

With Various Artist

- Funk N' R&B Box Set (2006)

With Da BackWudz

- Wood Work (2006)

With Electrofunkadelica

- e3+Funknth= Music for the Body, Mind & Soul (2006)

With Armin van Buuren

- State of Trance: Year Mix 2007 (2007)
- Armada Presents: Miami Tunes 2008 (2008)
- Armada Trance, Vol. 3 (2008)

With D'Angelo

- Yoda: The Monarch of Neo-Soul (2007)
- Yoda II (2008)
- James River (Album Prelude) (2010)

With D'Angelo and the Vanguard

- Black Messiah (2014)

With Crucial Conflict

- Planet Crucon (2008)

With Blake Jarrell

- Concentrate (2009)

With Lynwood Rose

- Lynwood Rose (2010)

With Sunshine Anderson

- The Sun Shines Again (2010)

With Various Artists

- Crusin' Music, Vol. 2 (2012)

With Funkadelic

- First Ya Gotta Shake the Gate (2014)
- Shake the Gate: Version Excursion (2015)

With Domo Genesis

- Genesis (2016)

With Snoop Dogg

- Coolaid (2016)

With Chris Dave and the Drumhedz

- Chris Dave and the Drumhedz (2018)

With Parliament

- Medicaid Fraud Dogg (2018)

With Michael Blume

- Cynicism & Sincerity (2018)

With Ben Williams

- I Am a Man (2020)

With Young Jimmy

- Rockett 88 (Deluxe) (2023)

With Jeymes Samuel, D'angelo and Jay-Z

- The Book of Clarence (Soundtrack) (2024)

With Maurice Brown

- Betta Days (2025)
