= Isaiah Sharkey =

American guitarist and singer-songwriter

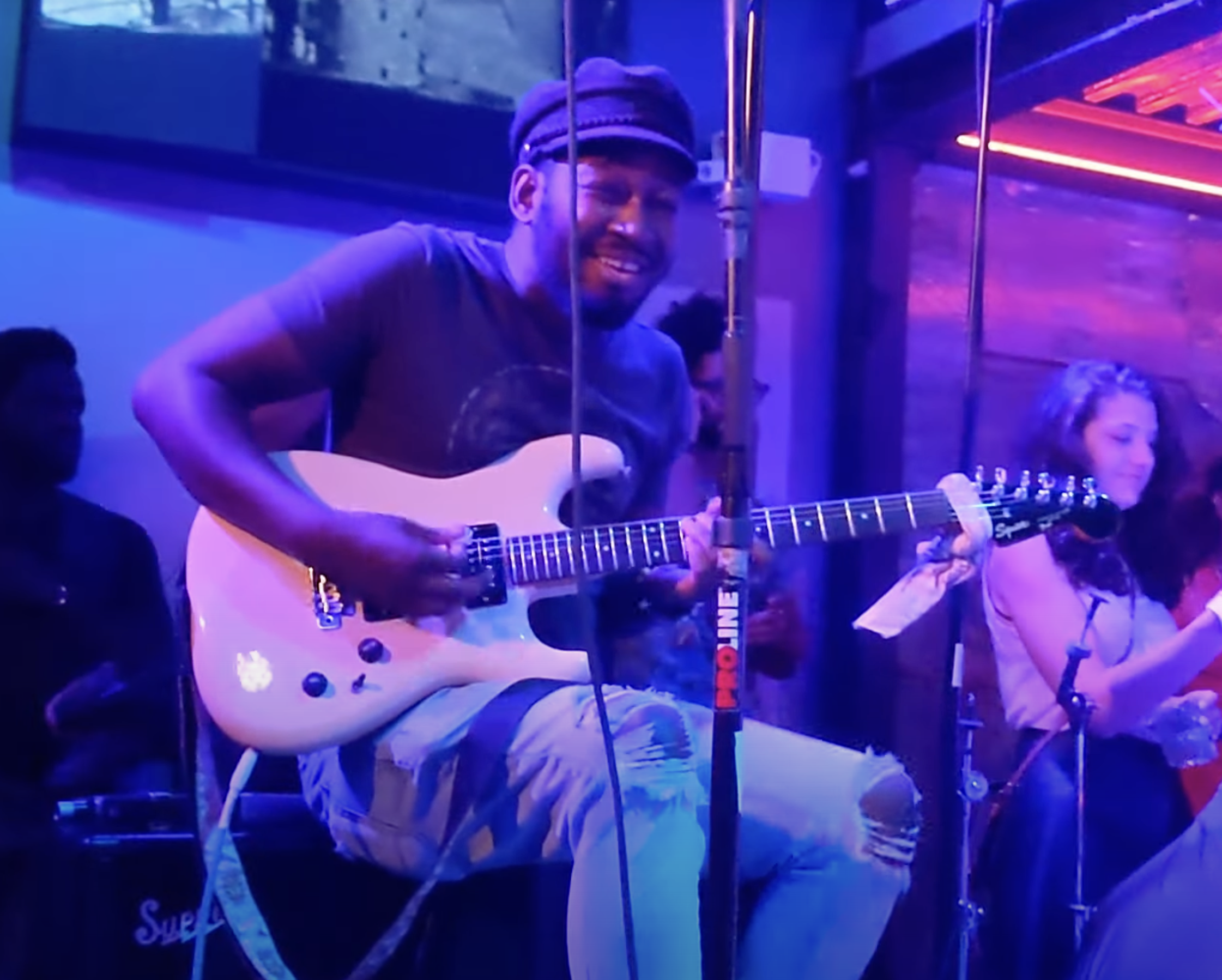
- Isaiah Sharkey performing with Maurice Brown in New York City in 2021

Background information
- Born: July 14, 1989 (age 37); Chicago, Illinois, U.S.
- Genres: Jazz; R&B; gospel
- Occupations: Guitarist; singer; songwriter; composer; producer
- Instruments: Guitar; vocals
- Years active: 2005–present
- Website: www.isaiahsharkey.live

Isaiah Sharkey (born July 14, 1989) is an American guitarist, singer-songwriter, and producer. He played guitar as a member of the Vanguard on D'Angelo's 2014 album Black Messiah, which won the Grammy Award for Best R&B Album. He is also a prolific sideman and session guitarist, having performed with John Mayer, Patti LaBelle, Chris Martin, Paul Simon, Corinne Bailey Rae, Mike Posner, Keith Urban, Brian McKnight, Boyz II Men, and Lalah Hathaway, among others.

A former child prodigy, Sharkey has been described by Guitar World as "a guitarist's guitarist."

== Early life ==
Isaiah Sharkey was born on July 14, 1989, in Chicago, Illinois. He comes from a musical family, his father being a professional multi-instrumentalist who played in several bands throughout Chicago in the '60s, '70s, and '80s. His father, aunt, and uncle were members of a band called the Fugitives. He credits his father, uncles, and older siblings for introducing him to gospel, R&B, blues, jazz, funk, and rock.

As a child, he lived in Chicago's Cabrini–Green Homes. At age four, he sang in a church choir with his older siblings and received his first acoustic guitar from his uncle. He also began playing bass at church and later received his first electric guitar for his seventh birthday. By age 14, he was playing in local jazz and blues clubs around Chicago, including the Velvet Lounge, which was owned by Fred Anderson. There, he played with jazz musicians including Bobby Irving, Corey Wilkes, and Anderson himself. With his father and older brothers, he recorded his first album Skyliner, a collection of jazz standard covers, which he released in 2005.

Sharkey names guitarists Wes Montgomery and George Benson as early musical influences.

== Career ==
In 2006, when Sharkey was 16 years old, he went on his first tour performing with gospel singer Smokie Norful. While still a teenager, he also worked with gospel singer Donald Lawrence and R&B singer Ronald Isley, formerly of The Isley Brothers.

In 2009, when Sharkey was 19, he met R&B musician D'Angelo by coincidence at a music store in Richmond, Virginia. He had previously studied with D'Angelo's late guitarist, Chalmers "Spanky" Alford. The two musicians instantly connected, and Sharkey began touring with D'Angelo over the next five years. Sharkey became one of D'Angelo's core collaborators, along with Pino Palladino, Questlove, Chris Dave, and Roy Hargrove. Together, they created D'Angelo's 2014 album Black Messiah, which was released to critical acclaim and won the 2015 Grammy Award for Best R&B Album. Sharkey said working with D'Angelo was one of his "dream gigs." His success with D'Angelo brought him opportunities as a sideman and session musician for other artists, including Paul Simon, Chris Martin, Patti LaBelle, and Keith Urban.

In 2016, Sharkey was rehearsing with The Roots for the Roots Picnic when he met guitarist John Mayer, who came to sit in. Mayer and Sharkey were mutual fans, and after jamming with The Roots, they felt an instant connection. Two weeks later, Mayer invited Sharkey to join his world tour, and he soon joined as Mayer's sideman.

In 2017, Sharkey released his debut solo album Love.Life.Live, which he had been working on intermittently since 2012. He released his second solo album Love Is the Key (The Cancerian Theme) in June 2019. Around this time, he began collaborating with artists including Common and Cory Henry.

In 2022, Sharkey released the lead single "Stay" for his third studio album, Black Sunshine. He performed every instrument on the track, recording and producing it himself during lockdown.

== Discography ==
Adapted from AllMusic.

=== Studio albums ===
- Love.Life.Live (2017)
- Love Is the Key (The Cancerian Theme) (2019)
- Black Sunshine (TBA)

=== As Isaiah Sharkey and the Family Tree ===
- Skyliner (2005)

=== As sideman ===
- Vanessa Bell Armstrong – The Experience (2009)
- Ronald Isley – Mr. I (2010)
- Shekinah Glory Ministry – Refreshed by Fire (2010)
- VaShawn Mitchell – Triumphant (2010)
- Ricky Dillard – Keep Living (2011)
- Richard Smallwood – Promises (2011)
- Donald Lawrence – YRM (Your Righteous Mind) (2011)
- Anthony Brown – Anthony Brown & Group TherAPy (2012)
- Regina Belle – Higher (2012)
- Shekinah Glory Ministry – Surrender (2012)
- Charles Jenkins – The Best of Both Worlds (2012)
- Anita Wilson – Worship Soul (2012)
- Donald Lawrence – 20 Year Celebration, Vol. 1: Best for Last (2013)
- Ronald Isley – This Song Is for You (2013)
- Ricky Dillard – Amazing (2014)
- D'Angelo – Black Messiah (2014)
- 3 Winans Brothers – Foreign Land (2014)
- Anita Wilson – Vintage Worship (2014)
- Charles Jenkins – Any Given Sunday (2015)
- DeWayne Woods – Life Lessons (2015)
- Marvin Sapp – You Shall Live (2015)
- Brian McKnight – An Evening with Brian McKnight (2016)
- Anderson .Paak – Malibu (2016)
- Myron Butler – On Purpose (2016)
- Corinne Bailey Rae – The Heart Speaks in Whispers (2016)
- JC Brooks – Neon Jungle (2017)
- Boyz II Men – Under the Streetlight (2017)
- Josh Groban – Bridges (2018)
- Chris Dave and the Drumhedz – Chris Dave and the Drumhedz (2018)
- Common – Let Love (2019)
- Miles Davis – Rubberband (2019)
- Bobby Sparks II – Schizophrenia: The Yang Project (2019)
- Common – A Beautiful Revolution Pt. 1 (2020)
- Josh Groban – Harmony (2020)
- Common – A Beautiful Revolution Pt. 2 (2021)
- Brittany Howard – Jaime (Reimagined) (2021)
- Bibio – Bib10 (2022)
- Robert Glasper – Black Radio III (2022)
- Cory Henry – Operation Funk (2022)
- Dinner Party – Whatchu Bringing? (2026)
