= George Clinton and His Gangsters of Love =

Studio album by George Clinton
- Released: September 16, 2008
- Genres: Funk, dance, R&B, hip hop, rock
- Length: 67:53
- Label: Shanachie
- Producers: George Clinton, Mark Bass

George Clinton chronology
How Late Do U Have 2BB4UR Absent? (2005)	George Clinton and His Gangsters of Love (2008)	Live...Capitol Theatre 1978 (2017)

Professional ratings
Review scores
Source	Rating
AllMusic	2.5/5 stars
Boston Herald	D
Robert Christgau	(dud)
PopMatters	5/10
URB	3/5 stars
USA Today	3/4 stars

George Clinton and His Gangsters of Love is a cover album by funk music pioneer George Clinton. The album includes guest appearances from the Red Hot Chili Peppers, Sly Stone, El DeBarge, System of a Down bassist Shavo Odadjian, Carlos Santana, RZA, Kim Manning and gospel singer Kim Burrell. The disc was released on September 16, 2008.

Some suggest the title of the album may actually be Radio Friendly, and that "George Clinton and Some Gangsters of Love" may be credited as the artist for the album. The album has also been referred to as Any Percentage of You Is As Good as the Whole Pie, although that may refer to another P-Funk album to be released later.

It features the last song recorded by the Red Hot Chili Peppers with guitarist John Frusciante prior to his second departure of the band in 2009.

== Track listing ==
No.	Title	Featured artist	Length
1.	"Ain't That Peculiar"	Sly Stone & El DeBarge	4:33
2.	"Never Gonna Give You Up"	El DeBarge	4:32
3.	"Mathematics of Love"	Kim Burrell	7:03
4.	"Let the Good Times Roll"	Red Hot Chili Peppers & Kim Manning	2:31
5.	"Pledging My Love"		3:25
6.	"Gypsy Woman"	Carlos Santana & El DeBarge	5:41
7.	"It's All in the Game"	El DeBarge	3:24
8.	"Heart Trouble"	Paul Hill	3:24
9.	"Our Day Will Come"	Kendra Foster	3:10
10.	"Sway"	Belita Woods	4:52
11.	"A Thousand Miles Away"		4:07
Total length:			46:42

Hidden tracks
No.	Title	Featured artist	Length
12.	"Heaven"	RZA	5:18
13.	"As In"		6:22
14.	"Stillness in Motion"		4:35
15.	"Fever"		4:56
Total length:			21:11 67:53
