= Really Love (D'Angelo song) =

Single by D'Angelo and the Vanguard

from the album Black Messiah
- Released: December 15, 2014
- Genre: Neo soul
- Length: 5:44
- Label: RCA
- Songwriters: Michael Archer; Gina Figueroa; Kendra Foster; Curtis Mayfield
- Producer: D'Angelo

D'Angelo singles chronology
"I Found My Smile Again" (2008)	"Really Love" (2014)	"The Charade" (2015)

Music video
- "Really Love" on YouTube

"Really Love" is a song performed by American neo soul singer D'Angelo (officially credited to D'Angelo and the Vanguard), issued as the first single from his third studio album Black Messiah. It was his first single since 2008's "I Found My Smile Again". The song was written by D'Angelo (credited under his real name, Michael Archer) along with Vanguard member Kendra Foster; the Spanish spoken-word segment was written and performed by Gina Figueroa. It contains a sample of "We the People Who Are Darker Than Blue" by Curtis Mayfield. The song was produced by D'Angelo. The string section heard during the intro was arranged and conducted by Brent Fischer.

"Really Love" peaked at No. 43 on the Billboard R&B chart in 2015. It was also nominated for Record of the Year, and won Best R&B Song at the 58th Annual Grammy Awards.

== Background ==
Much of the song was completed as early as 2007, when Questlove leaked snippets of the track to Australian radio station Triple J. The song was completed and released in December 2014, with D'Angelo handling the production himself.

== Critical reception ==
"Really Love" has received universal acclaim from critics. Walter Biggins of Glide magazine praised the song's lyrics and production as well as D'Angelo's vocals, which Biggins referred to as "what [listeners have] been missing for 14 years". Sasha Frere-Jones of The New Yorker referred to it as "a slow-burning song"; while Jon Pareles and Jon Carmanica of The New York Times complimented the song's "responsive string arrangement behind its declaration of affection".

== Live performances ==
D'Angelo performed "Really Love" live for the first time at the House of Blues on July 4, 2012, two years before its official release. On January 31, 2015, he performed the song on Saturday Night Live.

== Music video ==
No official music video was created for the song; however, an official video featuring the song's audio became available in December 2014.

== Charts ==
Chart (2015)	Peak position
US Hot R&B/Hip-Hop Songs (Billboard)	43
