= Black Messiah (album) =

Studio album by D'Angelo and the Vanguard
- Released: December 15, 2014
- Studios: MSR, Sear Sound, Avatar, and Quad Recording in New York City; Henson Recording and The Plant in Los Angeles Electric Lady Studios; Hydra SF
- Genres: Progressive soul; funk; R&B; neo soul; jazz-funk; rock
- Length: 55:54
- Label: RCA
- Producer: D'Angelo

D'Angelo chronology
The Best So Far (2008)	Black Messiah (2014)

Singles from Black Messiah
- 1. "Really Love" Released: December 15, 2014; 2. "Betray My Heart" Released: June 9, 2015

Black Messiah is the third studio album by the American musician D'Angelo, credited to D'Angelo and the Vanguard. Released on December 15, 2014, through RCA Records, more than fourteen years after his previous solo release Voodoo, it is D'Angelo's last album to be released during his lifetime. The album was produced and mostly written by D'Angelo, who collaborated with musicians including drummer Questlove, bassist Pino Palladino, guitarist Isaiah Sharkey, horn player Roy Hargrove, and singer and lyricist Kendra Foster. He pursued an entirely analog and murky funk sound for the record, lending comparisons to the 1971 Sly & the Family Stone album There's a Riot Goin' On.

Black Messiah was among 2014's most highly anticipated albums and was released to critical acclaim, later being ranked as one of the year's best albums. The album debuted at number 5 on the US Billboard charts and number 1 on the US Top R&B/Hip-Hop Albums, selling over 117,000 units in its first week. Black Messiah was promoted with the release of the single "Really Love" and a tour called The Second Coming. At the 58th Annual Grammy Awards, Black Messiah won Best R&B Album while "Really Love" won Best R&B Song and was nominated for Record of the Year.

== Background ==
D'Angelo released his critically acclaimed album Voodoo on January 25, 2000. Towards the end of his worldwide tour in support of the album that same year, D'Angelo's personal issues towards performing had worsened. He became more conscious of and uncomfortable with his status as a sex symbol, and after the tour D'Angelo returned to his home in Richmond, Virginia, disappearing from the public eye. Following the suicide of his close friend, MTV-affiliate Fred Jordan, in April 2001, he started to develop an alcohol addiction. As his alcoholism escalated, plans for a live album and a Soulquarians studio effort, both originally set for after the tour, were scrapped, and impatient Virgin executives cut off funding for the expected 2004 solo album.

By 2005, D'Angelo's girlfriend had left him, his attorney had become displeased with him, and most of his family was out of touch with him. He also parted ways with manager Dominique Trenier and tour manager Alan Leeds. After a car accident and an arrest on DUI and marijuana possession charges, D'Angelo left Virgin Records in 2005 and checked into the Crossroads Centre rehabilitation clinic in Antigua. In 2005, his recording contract was acquired by J Records, following rumors of D'Angelo signing to Bad Boy Records. Despite no solo output, D'Angelo collaborated with some R&B and hip hop artists during his period between albums, appearing on other albums such as J Dilla's The Shining (2006), Snoop Dogg's Tha Blue Carpet Treatment (2006), Common's Finding Forever (2007), and Q-Tip's The Renaissance (2008).

== Recording and production ==
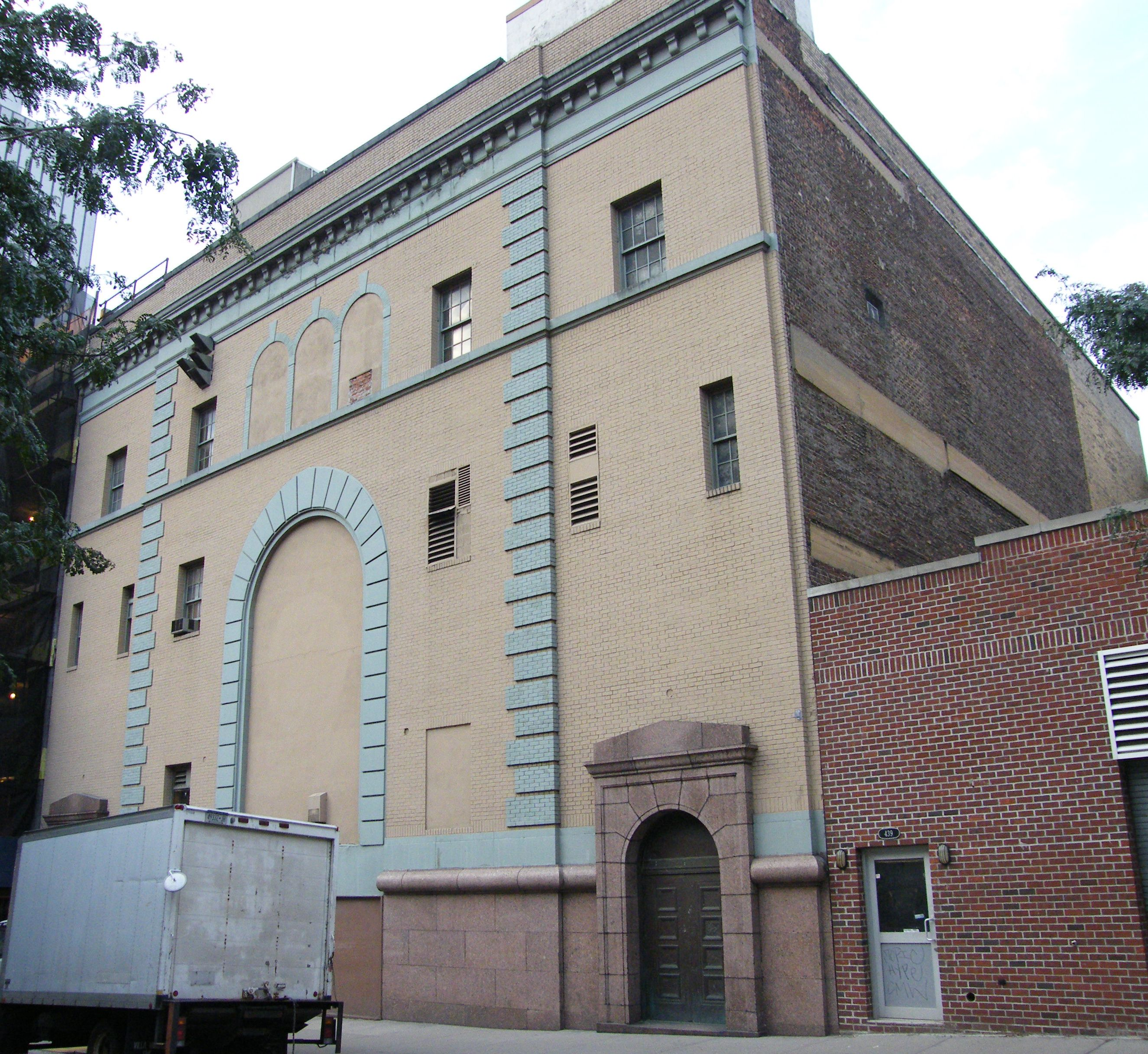
Avatar Studios, where part of the album was recorded

D'Angelo's subsequent solo work was extensively delayed. Production for a full-length follow-up to Voodoo was stagnant, as he was working on and off mostly by himself during 2002. D'Angelo attempted to play every instrument for the project, striving for complete creative control similar to that of Prince. Russell Elevado described the resulting material as "Parliament/Funkadelic meets the Beatles meets Prince, and the whole time there's this Jimi Hendrix energy." However, those who previewed its songs found it to be unfinished. In the years that followed, D'Angelo's personal problems worsened, descending to drug and alcohol addiction. In January 2005 he was arrested and charged with possession of marijuana and cocaine. Various mugshots began circulating around the time, showing the singer looking overweight and unhealthy, in stark contrast to the muscular D'Angelo seen in promotion for Voodoo. In September 2005, a week after being sentenced on the drug charges, he was involved in a car accident, and was rumoured to be critically injured. However, a week after the crash a statement was issued by D'Angelo's attorney saying he was "fine".

No more was revealed on the new album until 2007, when Questlove, D'Angelo's drummer and producer, leaked an unfinished track on Triple J Radio in Australia, entitled "Really Love". The leak allegedly soured relations between the two. In 2009, D'Angelo's then-new manager Lindsay Guion, revealed plans for a new album, including collaborations with artists including Prince, Kanye West, Busta Rhymes, and John Mayer, and a summer tour, saying "He's able to smile again and he's ready to connect [with fans], he's coming back. And he looks great, by the way." As with the previous year, no tour or album materialized. In early February 2010, a new track called "1000 Deaths" appeared on the Internet, but was swiftly removed due to a copyright claim by Michael Archer, D'Angelo's legal name. The song seemed unfinished, and it is unclear how recent the material actually is, as the same song was mentioned in the same interview (see above) with Russell Elevado, in 2007. Around the same time, an article began to circulate on the Internet, which seemed to be an apparent review of "James River", with detailed descriptions of individual songs, track listing, and segments of lyrics. This caused much discussion regarding the authenticity of the article, or whether it was an elaborate hoax.

In January 2011, Russell Elevado updated the status of the album development on his website and said, "Pino Palladino and James Gadson have joined D'Angelo [...] in New York City to finish cutting tracks for the upcoming album (yes, 'THE' upcoming album!). We are officially making our way to finishing this record! I don't need to tell everyone that this will be an amazing album. D'Angelo fans will be extremely happy to know, the wait will be over soon and it will surely be a future classic ..." Russell Elevado updated the status of the album again on his own website. "Since my last post I have continued sessions with D'Angelo. We've just finished up 5 months of recording. D has been doing vocals and guitars and we've had Pino Palladino back in for some more bass tracks. Also Questlove came in to jam with D and Pino. They've finally reunited after 7 or 8 years (lost track how long really). We're taking a few months break while I take care of some other projects that have been on the back burner."

In December 2011, Questlove confirmed the album to be "97% done" and that lyrics were the only aspect to finish. He likened the album to a "black version of Smile", expressing hopes it would be regarded alongside other experimental album including Sly & the Family Stone's There's a Riot Goin' On and Miles Davis' On the Corner. Questlove described D'Angelo's creative process as highly innovative, highlighting his custom-built synthesizer patches and experimental production techniques reminiscent of Herbie Hancock, Malcolm Cecil, and Robert Margouleff—figures known for their work on Stevie Wonder's projects. In 2012, D'Angelo returned to live performance with his Occupy Music Tour and resumed work on his third studio album at Electric Lady Studios. Final recording sessions took place at several studios, including MSR, Sear Sound, Avatar, and Quad Recording in New York City; The Plant and Henson Recording studios in Los Angeles; and Hydra SF in an undisclosed location. The album's title is a reference to a memo sent by J. Edgar Hoover's office within COINTELPRO about the potential rise of a "Black Messiah", a leader aiming to unite Black communities in the United States.

== Marketing and sales ==
In late November 2011, D'Angelo announced a series of 2012 European tour dates. The tour kicked off January 26 in Stockholm, Sweden with its final show on February 10. The tour featured a selection of hits from his two previous albums and songs from his upcoming album, which was close to completion. He premièred four new songs: "Sugah Daddy", "Ain't That Easy", "Another Life" and "The Charade" which were well received. On September 1, 2012, D'Angelo performed at Jay-Z's Made in America Festival where he again performed the new songs, "The Charade" and "Sugah Daddy".

D'Angelo originally wanted to release Black Messiah in 2015, however protests in Ferguson following the killing of Michael Brown inspired him to release it earlier. On December 12, 2014, Kevin Liles, D'Angelo's manager, shared a 15-second teaser of the album on YouTube. Two days later, the track "Sugah Daddy", which had been part of D'Angelo's set list since 2012, premiered at 3am EST and 1,000 downloads were available on Red Bull's 20 Before 15 website. After an exclusive listening party in New York, Black Messiah was released digitally on December 15 through iTunes, Google Play Music, and Spotify. The album's unexpected release was compared to Beyoncé's self-titled release in 2013. On January 13, 2015, "Really Love" was released to urban adult contemporary radio in the US.

In its first week of release, Black Messiah debuted at number 5 on the Billboard 200 and sold 117,000 copies in the United States. In its second week, the album dropped to number 25 on the chart and sold another 40,254 copies. In the United Kingdom, it debuted at number 47 on the UK Albums Chart with first-week sales of 7,423 copies.

D'Angelo supported Black Messiah with a tour called The Second Coming. His band, The Vanguard, comprised drummer Chris Dave, bassist Pino Palladino, guitarists Jesse Johnson and Isaiah Sharkey, vocalist Kendra Foster and keyboardist Cleo "Pookie" Sample. The European leg commenced in Zurich on February 11, 2015, and concluded in Brussels on March 7. "Betray My Heart" was released to urban adult contemporary radio in the US as the album's second single.

== Critical reception ==
Professional ratings
Aggregate scores
Source	Rating
AnyDecentMusic?	9.1/10
Metacritic	95/100
Review scores
Source	Rating
AllMusic	5/5 stars
Cuepoint (Expert Witness)	A−
The Independent	4/5 stars
The Irish Times	5/5 stars
Los Angeles Times	4/4 stars
NME	9/10
Pitchfork	9.4/10
Rolling Stone	4.5/5 stars
Spin	9/10
USA Today	3.5/4 stars

Black Messiah was met with widespread critical acclaim. At Metacritic, which assigns a normalized rating out of 100 reviews from mainstream publications, the album received an average score of 95, based on 30 reviews. Aggregator AnyDecentMusic? gave it 9.1 out of 10, based on their assessment of the critical consensus.

In a rave review for Rolling Stone, Rob Sheffield hailed the record as an "avant-soul dream palace" and a "warm, expansive masterpiece", while Greg Kot of the Chicago Tribune said it delves into unrefined funk and weighty themes without sounding overproduced. NME magazine's Angus Batey appraised it as one of the year's best albums and a richly detailed, enduring record that "repays a decade and a half's faith and patience". Slant Magazine's Sam C. Mac said D'Angelo combined funk, R&B, and rock with emotionally varied, socially relevant lyrics on an album "ever-worked, ever-tweaked, and perfected (in its distinctively imperfect way), but soul-bearing [sic] and raw like little else". The same publication's Jesse Cataldo called it "a stunning collection of majestically constructed prog-soul". In The Guardian, journalist Paul Lester deemed Black Messiah to be as much a socially conscious work as "a restatement of faith in the principles and sounds of the pre-digital era of black music", while Priya Elan of Mojo praised it as "a beaming, single-minded statement of spiritual rebirth and political reckoning" that finds D'Angelo appropriately political amid the 2014 Ferguson unrest. Will Hodgkinson, the chief critic for The Times, claimed he has revived soul music's "testifying spirit" with an album that addresses the African-American experience at a time when there has been no "musical response to the killing of unarmed black men by American policemen this year".

Many critics compared Black Messiah to Sly and the Family Stone's 1971 funk album There's a Riot Goin' On. According to Jon Pareles in The New York Times, it recalled that particular album because of the heavily multitracked vocals, the unpredictable flow of the music, and its roots in funk, rock, jazz, and gospel traditions, all the while highlighting D'Angelo's own musicianship "with all its glorious eccentricities". Somewhat less impressed, Andy Gill of The Independent said Black Messiah shared the "enervating confusion" of There's a Riot Goin' On, and that it was better at contextualizing questions of individual and political freedom than actually answering them. The New York Times said that Black Messiah "captured American unrest through the studio murk of Sly Stone, the fervor of Funkadelic and the off-kilter grooves somewhere between J Dilla and Captain Beefheart." In Robert Christgau's opinion, other critics had exaggerated just "how profoundly D'Angelo articulates his racial awareness and romantic struggle". In his own appraisal, published on Cuepoint, Black Messiah's achievement lay instead in the unique, dense jazz-funk highlighted by Palladino and Questlove, who he felt were as musically intuitive and virtuosic as "anyone in the pop sphere".

=== Accolades ===
At the end of 2014, Black Messiah appeared on a number of critics' top-ten lists of the year's best albums. It was ranked first by Chris Richard of The Washington Post, eighth best by Sheffield from Rolling Stone, seventh best by Pitchfork, and seventeenth best by Christgau in his top-albums list for The Barnes & Noble Review. It was also named the best album of the year in the Pazz & Jop, an annual poll of more than six hundred American critics and music journalists published by The Village Voice.

In February 2016, at the 58th Annual Grammy Awards, Black Messiah won Best R&B Album while "Really Love" won Best R&B Song and was nominated for Record of the Year. Along with Solange Knowles' A Seat at the Table (2016), Black Messiah was later cited by Clayton Purdom of The A.V. Club as "the best neo-soul album this decade". In 2019, it was ranked 49th on The Guardian's 100 Best Albums of the 21st Century list. That same year, Stereogum placed the album at number 70 on its list of "The 100 Best Albums Of The 2010s". In 2020, Rolling Stone ranked the album at number 395 on their updated list of the 500 Greatest Albums of All Time.

== Track listing ==
No.	Title	Lyrics	Music	Length
1.	"Ain't That Easy"	D'Angelo; Q-Tip; Kendra Foster	D'Angelo	4:49
2.	"1000 Deaths"	D'Angelo; Foster	D'Angelo	5:49
3.	"The Charade"	D'Angelo; Foster	D'Angelo; Questlove	3:20
4.	"Sugah Daddy"	D'Angelo; Q-Tip; Foster	D'Angelo; Pino Palladino; James Gadson	5:02
5.	"Really Love"	D'Angelo; Gina Figueroa; Foster	D'Angelo	5:44
6.	"Back to the Future (Part I)"	D'Angelo	D'Angelo	5:22
7.	"Till It's Done (Tutu)"	D'Angelo; Foster	D'Angelo	3:51
8.	"Prayer"	D'Angelo	D'Angelo	4:33
9.	"Betray My Heart"	D'Angelo	D'Angelo	5:55
10.	"The Door"	D'Angelo; Foster	D'Angelo	3:08
11.	"Back to the Future (Part II)"	D'Angelo	D'Angelo	2:24
12.	"Another Life"	D'Angelo; Foster	D'Angelo; Questlove	5:58
Total length:				55:54

Sample credits

- "1000 Deaths" contains a portion of the audio from the film The Murder of Fred Hampton.
- "Really Love" contains a sample from "We the People Who Are Darker Than Blue", written and performed by Curtis Mayfield.

== Personnel ==
Credits were adapted from the album's liner notes.

- D'Angelo – vocals, guitar, piano, organ, keyboards, synthesizers, bass, electric sitar, drum programming, percussion
- Spanky Alford – guitar
- Jesse Johnson – guitar
- Mark Hammond – guitar
- Isaiah Sharkey – guitar
- Pino Palladino – bass, electric sitar
- Ahmir "Questlove" Thompson – drums, drum programming, percussion
- Roy Hargrove – trumpet, cornet, flugelhorn
- James Gadson – drums
- Chris Dave – drums, drum programming
- Kendra Foster – background vocals
- Jermaine Holmes – background vocals
- Ahrell Lumzy – background vocals
- Gina Figueroa – spoken word
- Brent Fischer – arranger, conductor (strings on "Really Love")
- Russell Elevado – mixing, engineering
- Ben Kane – mixing, engineering
- Tony Rambo – engineering
- Benny Allen – engineering
- Dave Collins – mastering
- Alex De Turk – mastering (vinyl)

== Charts ==
=== Weekly charts ===
Chart (2015)	Peak position
Australian Albums (ARIA)	50
Austrian Albums (Ö3 Austria)	71
Belgian Albums (Ultratop Flanders)	33
Belgian Albums (Ultratop Wallonia)	109
Canadian Albums (Billboard)	17
Danish Albums (Hitlisten)	36
Dutch Albums (Album Top 100)	10
Finnish Albums (Suomen virallinen lista)	8
French Albums (SNEP)	149
German Albums (Offizielle Top 100)	85
New Zealand Albums (RMNZ)	30
Norwegian Albums (VG-lista)	10
Portuguese Albums (AFP)	17
Scottish Albums (Official Charts)	96
Swedish Albums (Sverigetopplistan)	35
Swiss Albums (Schweizer Hitparade)	25
UK Albums (Official Charts)	47
UK R&B Albums (Official Charts)	4
US Billboard 200	5
US Top R&B/Hip-Hop Albums (Billboard)	1
US Indie Store Album Sales (Billboard)	1

Chart (2025)	Peak position
Japanese Download Albums (Billboard Japan)	87

=== Year-end charts ===
Chart (2015)	Position
Belgian Albums (Ultratop Flanders)	148
Dutch Albums (MegaCharts)	87
US Billboard 200	118
US Top R&B/Hip-Hop Albums (Billboard)	12

== See also ==
- List of Billboard number-one R&B albums (2015)
