= Back Up (Snoop Dogg song) =

Single by Snoop Dogg

from the album Beach City
- Released: November 18, 2015
- Recorded: 2015
- Genre: West coast hip hop
- Length: 4:30
- Label: Doggystyle; SCSD Music
- Songwriters: Calvin Broadus; Elijah B. Molina
- Producer: Scoop DeVille

Snoop Dogg singles chronology
"Professional Rapper" (2015)	"Back Up" (2015)	"Pain" (2016)

"Back Up" is a song by American West Coast hip hop recording artist Snoop Dogg. It was released for digital download and streaming on November 18, 2015. The song is the first single released from the Mixtape Beach City (2015). The song produced by Scoop DeVille and mixing by Todd Cooper. The artwork was created by John Fenerides.

== Commercial performance ==
"Back Up" entered the Canadian Songs Chart dated November 22, 2015 at number 89. The song has peaked at number 80 on the chart.

== Track listing ==
- Download digital
1. Back Up (Explicit) — 4:30
- Music streaming
1. Back Up — 4:30

== Music video ==
On December 16, 2015 Snoop uploaded the lyric video for "Back Up" on his YouTube account.

== Charts ==
=== Weekly charts ===
Chart (2015)	Peak position
Canada (Canadian Songs Chart)	80
