= Keyon Harrold =

American jazz trumpeter, vocalist, songwriter

- Born: Keyon Karim Harrold; November 18, 1980 (age 46); Ferguson, Missouri, U.S.
- Genres: Jazz; hip hop; neo soul
- Occupations: Musician; vocalist; songwriter; producer
- Instrument: Trumpet
- Labels: Criss Cross Jazz; Legacy; Mass Appeal; Sony; Columbia
- Website: keyonharrold.com

Keyon Karim Harrold (born November 18, 1980) is an American jazz trumpeter, vocalist, songwriter, and producer.

== Early life and family ==
Keyon Harrold was born and raised in Ferguson, Missouri, United States, one of 16 children in a family of musicians. His grandfather was a former police officer who founded The Memorial Lancers Drum and Bugle Corps. Harrold graduated from the School of Jazz at The New School.

Harrold counts Miles Davis' second great quintet, Prince, Common, Dr. Dre and J Dilla as influences.

Harrold is a member of the Omega Psi Phi fraternity. He was initiated into the fraternity in November 2022 via the Rho Mu Mu graduate chapter in Chicago, Illinois.

== Career ==
Harrold's first professional gig was as a trumpeter with Common, an audition he secured on the recommendation of New School classmate Robert Glasper. He performed at The White House as part of Common's Tiny Desk Concert for NPR in 2016.

A mentee of trumpeter Charles Tolliver, Harrold performed as part of Tolliver's big band on the studio album With Love (2006) and concert release Emperor March: Live at the Blue Note (2009).

During this period, Harrold became a notable crossover performer, becoming a staple of New York jazz clubs as well as providing instrumentation for recordings by JAY-Z, Beyoncé, 50 Cent, Anthony Hamilton, Gregory Porter, Mac Miller, Mary J. Blige and Maxwell. Harrold has also toured with Cirque du Soleil's Michael Jackson: The Immortal World Tour, Rihanna, Eminem, Gregory Porter, D’Angelo, Maxwell and Mary J. Blige.

Harrold supplied all of the trumpet playing in Don Cheadle’s Miles Davis biopic Miles Ahead, playing to match Cheadle’s on-screen performance as well as the character of Junior, portrayed by LaKeith Stanfield. The soundtrack to the film won a Grammy Award for Best Compilation Soundtrack for Visual Media.

His first solo album, Introducing Keyon Harrold, was released in 2009. AllMusic praised the album, saying "it bodes well for his bright future" as one of "the leading jazz trumpet players of a new generation." A follow-up, The Mugician, was released on September 29, 2017 to positive reviews.

Harrold appeared on WNYC's "All Of It" on August 16, 2019 alongside Freddie Stone.

In August 2020, Harrold contributed to the live streamed recording of the singer Bilal's EP VOYAGE-19, created remotely during the COVID-19 lockdowns. It was released the following month with proceeds from its sales going to participating musicians in financial hardship from the pandemic. In September 2022 he played at the Brighton Jazz Festival.

== SoHo incident ==
Harrold filed a harassment complaint after 22-year-old Miya Ponsetto assaulted his 14-year-old son, Keyon Harrold Jr., after falsely accusing him of stealing her cell phone at the Arlo SoHo Hotel in New York City on December 26, 2020. Even though both the son and his father denied the theft to the manager and the accuser, cellphone video of the incident shows the woman tackling the child to the ground in front of his father.

The video also showed the manager of the hotel supporting the female accuser without apparent grounds. "I didn't have the opportunity to be believed, and neither did my son. We were guilty then proven innocent," Harrold said. The woman's iPhone was later returned by an Uber driver, whose car she had left it in.

New York detectives arrested Ponsetto at her Ventura County, California, home on January 7, 2021. She has been charged with attempted robbery, endangering the welfare of a child, attempted grand larceny and attempted assault. It was also revealed that Ponsetto was arrested twice in 2020 for public intoxication and drunk driving. During the initial court hearing in March 2021, Ponsetto interrupted the judge by requesting to avoid jail time. In June 2021, a grand jury charged her with a felony hate crime, with charges including "unlawful imprisonment, as a hate crime, endangering the welfare of a child, and aggravated harassment." Ponsetto pleaded not guilty.

== Discography ==
=== As leader ===
- Introducing Keyon Harrold (Criss Cross, 2009)
- The Mugician (Legacy, 2017)
- Foreverland (Concord Jazz, 2024)

=== As guest ===
- 50 Cent, "Touch the Sky" (from Curtis Aftermath/Interscope, 2007)
- Beyonce, "Back Up" (from B'Day Columbia, 2006)
- Big K.R.I.T., "Cool 2 Be Southern" (from Live from the Underground Def Jam, 2012)
- Michael Leonhart & JSWISS, "The Chase" (from Bona Fide, 2022)
- Otis Brown III, The Thought of You (Blue Note, 2014)
- Will Calhoun, Celebrating Elvin Jones (Motema, 2016)
- Andrae Crouch, Live in Los Angeles (Riverphio Entertainment, 2013)
- Anthony Hamilton, Back to Love (RCA, 2011)
- Billy Harper, Blueprints of Jazz Vol. 2 (Talking House Records, 2008)
- Maya Hatch, "Spice of Life" (Spice of Life. 2012)
- Derrick Hodge, Live Today (Blue Note, 2013)
- JAY-Z, "Roc Boys (And the Winner Is…)" (from American Gangster Roc-a-Fella, 2007)
- John Legend & Mary J. Blige, "King and Queen" (from Once Again G.O.O.D./Columbia, 2006)
- Maxwell, BLACKsummers'night (Columbia, 2009)
- Maxwell, "Pretty Wings"" (from Pretty Wings - Columbia, 2009)
- Jason McGuiness, "We Could Be/Empyrean Tones", 7" (Analog Burners, 2016)
- Mac Miller, "Stay" (from The Divine Feminine REMember/Warner Bros., 2016)
- Mobb Deep, "Smoke It" (from Blood Money - Interscope, 2006)
- PJ Morton, "Claustrophobic" and 1 more (from Gumbo - Morton, 2017)
- Gregory Porter, "Real Good Hands" (from Be Good Blue Note, 2012)
- Gregory Porter, Take Me to the Alley (Blue Note, 2016)
- David Sanborn, Here & Gone (Decca, 2008)
- Nina Simone, "Don't Let Me Be Misunderstood" & 2 more (Revive Music, RCA, 2015)
- Lonnie Smith, Evolution (Blue Note, 2016)
- John Stoddart, Faith, Hope Love (Urban Junction East Music, 2010)
- Joss Stone, "I Believe it to my Soul" (from Colour Me Free!) (Virgin, 2009)
- Marcus Strickland, Nihil Novi (Blue Note, Revive Music, 2016)
- Charles Tolliver, With Love (Blue Note/Mosaic, 2006)
- Charles Tolliver, Emperor March: Live at the Blue Note (Blue Note, 2009)
- Samm Henshaw, Untidy Soul (AWAL Recordings, 2022)
- Kendra Foster, Nothing is Impossible (feat. Keyon Harrold) (Ear Kandy/Theorymusik, 2023)
