= Chris Dave =

American drummer (born 1973)

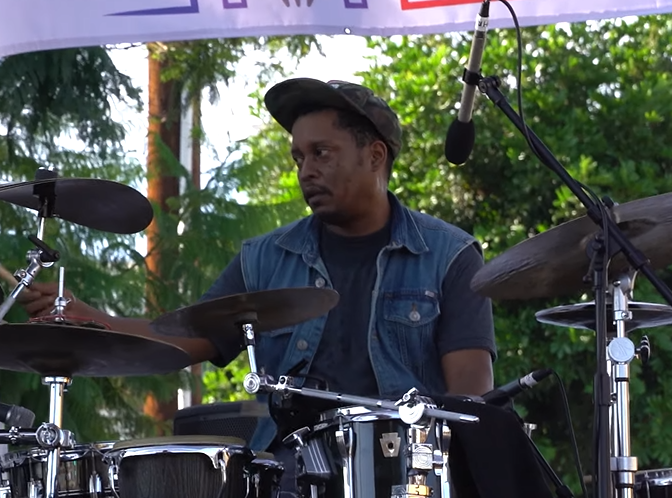
- Dave performing in 2019

Background information
- Also known as: Chris "Daddy" Dave
- Born: Christopher Dave; November 8, 1973 (age 52); Houston, Texas, U.S.
- Genres: Jazz, hip hop, gospel, pop
- Occupation: Session musician
- Instrument: Drums
- Years active: 1980s–present
- Spouse: Nataly Andria (m. 2021)
- Website: allchrisdave.com

Chris "Daddy" Dave is a drummer, composer, and bandleader from Houston, Texas. He attended Howard University. He is a drummer in jazz, gospel, hip hop, noted for his extremely virtuosic sticking technique and ability to play with a high degree of syncopation. He performed professionally as a gospel drummer with the Winans, before being introduced to jazz audiences nationally through his association with the accomplished alto saxophonist Kenny Garrett. He performed on Kenny Garrett's album Standard of Language, before joining the Robert Glasper Experiment and performing on Adele's Grammy Award winning album, 21. He also recorded on D'Angelo's album Black Messiah, and joined the band for the world tour.

== Life and career ==
Chris Dave was born in Houston, Texas and began his music career in the late 1980s. He started out by playing in church and credits jazz music as his strongest influence. He states that although his father plays drums, he has never actually heard him play. As a teenager, he was exposed to jazz legends like Miles Davis and John Coltrane when listening to music with his father. Chris Dave blossomed on the drums, eventually graduating from Houston's prestigious High School for the Performing and Visual Arts.

He studied at Howard University in Washington D.C. where he met acclaimed producers and former Prince associates Jimmy Jam and Terry Lewis. Through this relationship, Chris Dave's professional career began as he started working with R&B band Mint Condition.

Dave played drums in Bilal's live band, during the singer's period of touring in the aftermath of his unreleased but leaked album Love for Sale. This included a stint on Jill Scott's The Real Thing Tour in 2008.

== Personal life ==
Dave married Madagascar native, singer-songwriter, Nataly Andria, in Houston, Texas in January 2021. They have apparently been in a long-term relationship prior to the wedding according to Andria's website although the time when they truly began dating has never been revealed so far.

They have a daughter, Avo Dave, born in December 2021.

== Discography ==
=== As leader ===
- Chris Dave and the Drumhedz – Mixtape (Glow365, 2013)
- Chris Dave and the Drumhedz – Radio Show (Glow365, 2017)
- Chris Dave and the Drumhedz – Chris Dave and the Drumhedz (Blue Note, 2018)
- Chris Dave & Daniel Crawford – Smoke Break (2020)
- Chris Dave & Daniel Crawford – Cuffin Season (Drumhedz Music, 2020)
- Chris Dave – Thine People (EP)(Drumhedz Music, Feb 2021)
- Chris Dave – Thine People Vol.2 (EP)(Drumhedz Music, Aug 2021)
- Chris Dave – "The City of Everly" (EP) (Drumhedz Music, Oct 2021)
- Chris Dave – "The City of Everly, Part. 2 SUPEREARTH" (EP) (Drumhedz Music, Dec 2021)

=== As sideman ===
With Mint Condition

- From the Mint Factory (Perspective, 1993)
- Definition of a Band (Perspective, 1996)
- Life's Aquarium (Elektra, 1999)
- Livin' the Luxury Brown (Image Entertainment, 2005)

With Kenny Garrett

- Simply Said (Warner Bros., 1999)
- Happy People (Warner Bros., 2002)
- Standard of Language (Warner Bros., 2003)

With Robert Glasper

- Double-Booked (Blue Note, 2009)
- Black Radio (Blue Note, 2012)
- F**k Yo Feelings (Loma Vista Recordings, 2019)
- Black Radio III (Loma Vista,2022)

With Me'shell Ndegeocello

- Comfort Woman (Maverick, 2003)
- The Spirit Music Jamia: Dance of the Infidel (Universal Music, 2005)

With Hikaru Utada

- Hatsukoi (初恋) (Epic, 2018)
- Hikaru Utada & Nariaki Obukuro – "Marunouchi Sadistic" on Ringo Sheena's cover album Adam to Eve no Ringo (アダムとイヴの林檎) (Epic, 2018)

With Eric Roberson

- Mister Nice Guy (Blue Erro Soul/eOne Music, 2011)
- Lessons (Blue Erro Soul, 2022)

With others

- Maxwell – BLACKsummers'night (Columbia, 2009)
- Adele – 21 (XL, 2011)
- PJ Morton – New Orleans (2013)
- Ed Sheeran – X (album) (2014)
- Lil' John Roberts – The Heartbeat (NIA Music Distribution, 2014)
- Angus & Julia Stone – Angus & Julia Stone (American Recordings, 2014)
- D'Angelo – Black Messiah (RCA, 2014)
- Justin Bieber – Purpose (Def Jam Recordings, 2015)
- SiR – Seven Sundays (Fresh Selects, 2015)
- Anderson .Paak – Malibu (ArtClub, 2016)
- Nariaki Obukuro – Bunriha no Natsu (Sony Music, 2018)
- Black Milk – Fever (Mass Appeal, 2018)
- Anderson .Paak – Oxnard (12Tone, 2018)
- Raphael Saadiq – Jimmy Lee (Columbia, 2019)
- Robbie Robertson – Sinematic (UME Direct, 2019)
- Preservation – "A Scholar's Rock" (with GrandeMarshall) on Eastern Medicine, Western Illness (MonDieu Music / Nature Sounds, 2020)
- Slingbaum – "Behoove" (with D'Angelo & Erykah Badu) on Slingbaum One EP (Muabgnils Incorporated, 2020)
- Pino Paladino and Blake Mills – "Just Wrong" (single) and "Ekuté" on Notes With Attachments (Impulse!, 2021)
- Adele – 30 (Columbia Records, 2022)
- Theo Croker – Love Quantum (Masterworks, 2022)
- Little Simz – No Thank You (Forevering Living Originals, 2022)
- Goapele – Colors (Skyblaze Recordings, 2023)
- Keyon Harrold – Foreverland (Concord Jazz, 2024)
- Marcus King – Mood Swings (Republic Records, 2024)
- Tank and the Bangas – The Heart, The Mind, The Soul (Verve, 2024)
- Pino Paladino and Blake Mills – That Wasn't A Dream (Impulse!, 2025)
