= D'Angelo =

American musician (1974–2025)

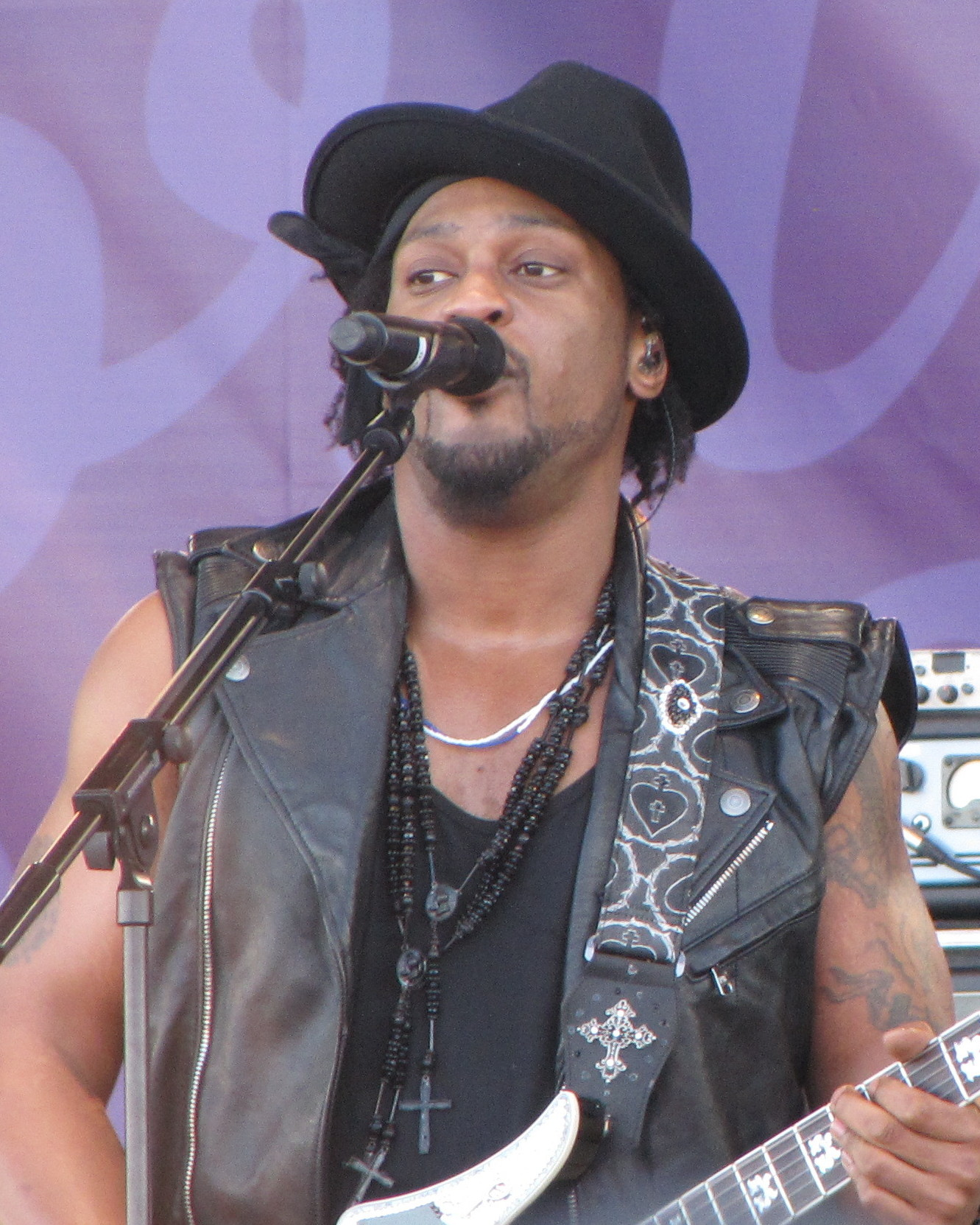
- D'Angelo in 2012

Background information
- Born: Michael Eugene Archer; February 11, 1974; Richmond, Virginia, U.S.
- Died: October 14, 2025 (aged 51) New York City, U.S.
- Genres: Neo soul; progressive soul; R&B
- Occupations: Musician; singer; songwriter; record producer
- Instruments: Vocals; bass; guitar; piano; keyboards; drums
- Works: Discography
- Years active: 1991–2025
- Labels: EMI; Virgin; J; RCA
- Formerly of: Soulquarians; The Soultronics; The Vanguard; I.D.U.
- Children: 3

Michael Eugene Archer (February 11, 1974 – October 14, 2025), better known by his stage name D'Angelo (/diˈændʒəloʊ/ dee-AN-jəl-oh), was an American singer, songwriter, multi-instrumentalist, and record producer. Widely regarded as a pioneer of the neo-soul movement, (Note: D'Angelo did not personally use the neo-soul label, and instead used the term Black music to refer to his work.) Billboard named him one of the greatest R&B artists, while Rolling Stone ranked him as one of the 200 Greatest Singers of All Time. In 2025, he was inducted into the National Rhythm & Blues Hall of Fame.

D'Angelo gained attention after co-writing and co-producing the 1994 single "U Will Know" by the R&B supergroup Black Men United. His debut album, Brown Sugar (1995), was certified platinum and received acclaim; critics have credited it with ushering in the neo-soul movement. It featured "Brown Sugar", the Smokey Robinson cover "Cruisin", and "Lady", with the latter reaching the top ten of the Billboard Hot 100.

D'Angelo collaborated with Angie Stone, Erykah Badu, and Lauryn Hill, with whom he performed on the 1998 song "Nothing Even Matters" from her album The Miseducation of Lauryn Hill. His next album, Voodoo (2000), debuted at number one on the U.S. Billboard 200 and received acclaim. It was also certified platinum by RIAA. Its third single "Untitled (How Does It Feel)" was released alongside an impactful music video. The song earned him the Grammy Award for Best Male R&B Vocal Performance, while the album itself won Best R&B Album. Voodoo was listed as 28th on Rolling Stone's 500 Greatest Albums of All Time.

D'Angelo became uncomfortable with his growing status as a sex symbol. He had numerous personal struggles including depression, drug addiction and alcoholism, which resulted in limited musical output for several years. After over a decade spent mostly out of the public eye, he released his third and final album, Black Messiah (2014). The album debuted in the top five of the U.S. Billboard 200 and topped the year-end Pazz & Jop critics' poll by The Village Voice. It won Best R&B Album at the 58th Grammy Awards, while the single "Really Love" won Best R&B Song and was nominated for Record of the Year. He also contributed the song "Unshaken" to the 2018 video game Red Dead Redemption 2. During the production of a fourth album, he died in 2025 of pancreatic cancer.

== Early life ==
Michael Eugene Archer was born in the Southside area of Richmond, Virginia, on February 11, 1974. He grew up in a Pentecostal family and played piano at the church where his father was a preacher. His musical talents were discovered very early as a child. He was three when he was spotted by his 10-year-old brother playing the house piano. After the formation of the Richmond musical group Precise, they found success performing in the Amateur Night competition at Harlem, New York's Apollo Theater in 1991. The 18-year-old dropped out of school and moved to New York City in an attempt to develop his music career. The group previously enjoyed some notice in Richmond, evenly dividing their repertoire between soul covers and originals while Archer accumulated compositions of his own and developed his songwriting skills. The group's turnout on Amateur Night resulted in three consecutive wins and cash prizes, and upon returning home to Richmond, Archer was inspired to produce an album and began composing music. That was after a brief tenure as a member of the hip-hop group I.D.U. (Intelligent, Deadly but Unique).

== Career ==
=== 1991–1995: Brown Sugar ===
At 17, D'Angelo met Afropunk Festival partner Jocelyn Cooper, who signed him to Midnight Songs LLC, her joint venture publishing company administered by Universal Music Publishing Group after hearing a demo of the hip hop group I.D.U. (Intelligent, Deadly but Unique), which D'Angelo produced and rapped in. After signing, Cooper introduced D'Angelo to musicians Raphael Saadiq, Ali Shaheed Muhammad, and Angie Stone to collaborate as songwriters. Cooper then introduced D'Angelo to Fred Davis, Head of A&R and Gary Harris at EMI Music. After an impressive audition, D'Angelo was signed to a recording contract in 1993. Cooper also introduced D'Angelo to attorney Kedar Massenburg who helped negotiate his contract. Massenburg later became D'Angelo's manager.

In 1994, his first significant success came in the form of the hit single "U Will Know". D'Angelo co-wrote and co-produced the song for the all-male R&B supergroup Black Men United, which featured R&B singers such as Brian McKnight, Usher, R. Kelly, Boyz II Men, Raphael Saadiq, and Gerald Levert. D'Angelo composed the music for "U Will Know", while his brother, Luther Archer, Midnight Songs LLC writer, wrote the lyrics. Originally featured on the soundtrack to the film Jason's Lyric (1994), the single peaked at number 5 on the Hot R&B/Hip-Hop Singles & Tracks and at number 28 on the Billboard Hot 100. The music video for "U Will Know" featured D'Angelo as the group's choir director; he reprised the role for the live performance of the song at the Soul Train Music Awards. That same year, he wrote and produced the song "Overjoyed" for the Boys Choir of Harlem, which appeared on their album The Sound of Hope (1994). The success of "U Will Know" helped build the buzz surrounding D'Angelo, which was followed by a number of highly promoted showcases, and added to the buzz among music industry insiders.

His debut album, Brown Sugar, was released in July 1995. Although sales were sluggish at first, the album was eventually a hit. The album debuted at number 6 on the US Billboard Top R&B Albums chart in the week of July 22, 1995. It ultimately peaked at number 4 in the week of February 24, 1996, and spent more than a year on the chart. Brown Sugar spent sixty-five weeks on the Billboard 200 and peaked at number 22 on the chart. It sold 300,000 copies within two months. The album had been selling 35,000 to 40,000 copies a week through to November 1995, and by January 1996, it had sold 400,000 copies. With the help of its four singles, including the gold-selling Billboard Hot 100 hit "Lady" and R&B top-ten singles "Brown Sugar" and "Cruisin", the album reached sales of 500,000 copies in the United States by October 1995. On February 7, 1996, it was certified platinum by the Recording Industry Association of America, following shipments in excess of one million in the U.S. The album was certified gold in Canada on May 9, 2000. Its total sales have been estimated within the range of 1.5 million to over 2 million units.

=== 1996–2000: Reduced activity and Voodoo ===
After the success of his debut album Brown Sugar in 1995, D'Angelo became less active in the music scene and released limited solo work. After touring for two years to promote the album Brown Sugar, D'Angelo suffered from writer's block. Of the setback, D'Angelo later stated "The thing about writer's block is that you want to write so fucking bad, [but] the songs don't come out that way. They come from life. So you've got to live to write." During that period, he generally released cover versions and remakes, such as a cover of the Marvin Gaye and Tammi Terrell duet song "Your Precious Love" with Erykah Badu for the soundtrack to High School High (1996). D'Angelo contributed the original song "I Found My Smile Again" to the Space Jam soundtrack (1996). He covered Prince's "She's Always in My Hair" for the Scream 2 soundtrack (1997), as well as the Ohio Players' "Heaven Must Be Like This" for the Down in the Delta soundtrack (1998). D'Angelo also appeared on a duet, "Nothing Even Matters", with Lauryn Hill for her debut solo album The Miseducation of Lauryn Hill (1998).

The much-delayed follow-up to Brown Sugar, Voodoo, was released in 2000 on Virgin Records after EMI Records Group was absorbed by the label. Voodoo received rave reviews from music critics, who dubbed it a "masterpiece" and D'Angelo's greatest work. The album debuted at number 1 on the US Billboard 200 chart, selling 320,000 copies in its first week. It entered the Billboard 200 on February 12, 2000, and remained on the chart for thirty-three consecutive weeks. As of 2005, the album has sold over 1.7 million copies in the US, according to Nielsen SoundScan. In 2001, Voodoo won a Grammy Award for Best R&B Album at the 43rd Grammy Awards which was awarded to D'Angelo and recording engineer Russell Elevado. The album was executive-produced by D'Angelo's manager and creative collaborator, Dominique Trenier.

Its first two singles, "Devil's Pie" and "Left & Right", peaked at number 69 and number 70 on the Billboard Hot 100 chart. The latter was commercially aimed at R&B and hip-hop-oriented radio stations due to the prominence of rappers Redman and Method Man on the track. According to Rich Ford Jr., producer of the "Left & Right" music video, both the single and the video went commercially unnoticed due to MTV's refusal to place the song's video in rotation, serving as punishment for missing the deadline for its initial premiere. The fifth single "Feel Like Makin' Love" was less successful, reaching number 109 on the Hot R&B/Hip-Hop Singles & Tracks. "Send It On", the album's fourth single, achieved moderate chart success, peaking at number 33 on Billboard's Pop Singles chart. The album's third single, "Untitled (How Does It Feel)", became its greatest chart success, peaking at number 25 on the Hot 100 Singles and at number 2 on the R&B Singles chart. Its infamous music video helped in boosting the song's appeal, as well as D'Angelo's. Billboard wrote of the video, "It's pure sexuality. D'Angelo, muscularly cut and glistening, is shot from the hips up, naked, with just enough shown to prompt a slow burning desire in most any woman who sees it. The video alone could make the song one of the biggest of the coming year". It earned three nominations for the 2000 MTV Video Music Awards including Video of the Year, Best R&B Video, and Best Male Video.

=== 2001–2013: Personal struggles and delayed album ===
Near the end of his worldwide tour in support of the album that same year, D'Angelo's personal issues had worsened, affecting performances. He became more conscious of and uncomfortable with his status as a sex symbol, and after the tour D'Angelo returned to his home in Richmond, Virginia, disappearing from the public eye. The impact of the "Untitled (How Does It Feel)" music video, in which he performed nude, and The Voodoo Tour contributed to D'Angelo's perception as a sex symbol. His former music manager, Dominique Trenier, explained his disappointment in the music video's impact saying that "to this day, in the general populace's memory, he's the naked dude." He retreated from public life and stopped giving interviews in 2000.

According to tour manager Alan Leeds, the experience "took away his confidence, because he's not convinced why any given fan is supporting him." After the suicide of his close friend, MTV-affiliate Fred Jordan, in April 2001, he started to develop a drinking problem. As his alcoholism escalated, plans for a live album and a Soultronics studio effort, both originally set for after the tour, were scrapped, and impatient Virgin executives cut off funding for the expected 2004 solo album. During this period he collaborated with Raphael Saadiq on the song "Be Here", which was included on Saadiq's album Instant Vintage and nominated for best Best R&B Song and Best Urban/Alternative Performance at the 45th Grammy Awards.

By 2005, D'Angelo's girlfriend had left him, his attorney had become displeased with him, and most of his family was not in touch with him. He also parted ways with Trenier and Leeds, his tour manager. After a car accident and an arrest on DUI and marijuana possession charges, D'Angelo left Virgin Records in 2005 and checked into the Crossroads Centre rehabilitation clinic in Antigua. In 2005, his recording contract was acquired by J Records, following rumors of D'Angelo signing to Bad Boy Records. Despite no solo output, D'Angelo collaborated with some R&B and hip-hop artists during this period between albums, appearing on albums such as J Dilla's The Shining (2006), Snoop Dogg's Tha Blue Carpet Treatment (2006), Common's Finding Forever (2007), and Q-Tip's The Renaissance (2008).

D'Angelo's subsequent solo work was extensively delayed. Production for a full-length follow-up to Voodoo was stagnant, as he was working on and off mostly by himself during 2002. D'Angelo attempted to play every instrument for the project, striving for complete creative control similar to that of Prince. Russell Elevado described the resulting material as "Parliament/Funkadelic meets the Beatles meets Prince, and the whole time there's this Jimi Hendrix energy". However, those who previewed its songs found it to be unfinished. D'Angelo's personal problems worsened, descending to drug and alcohol addiction. In January 2005 he was arrested and charged with possession of marijuana and cocaine. In September 2005, a week after being sentenced on the drug charges, he was involved in a car accident, and was rumored to be critically injured. However, a week after the crash a statement was issued by D'Angelo's attorney stating that he was fine, continuing to say, "He is anxious to finish the recording of his soul masterpiece that the world has patiently awaited."

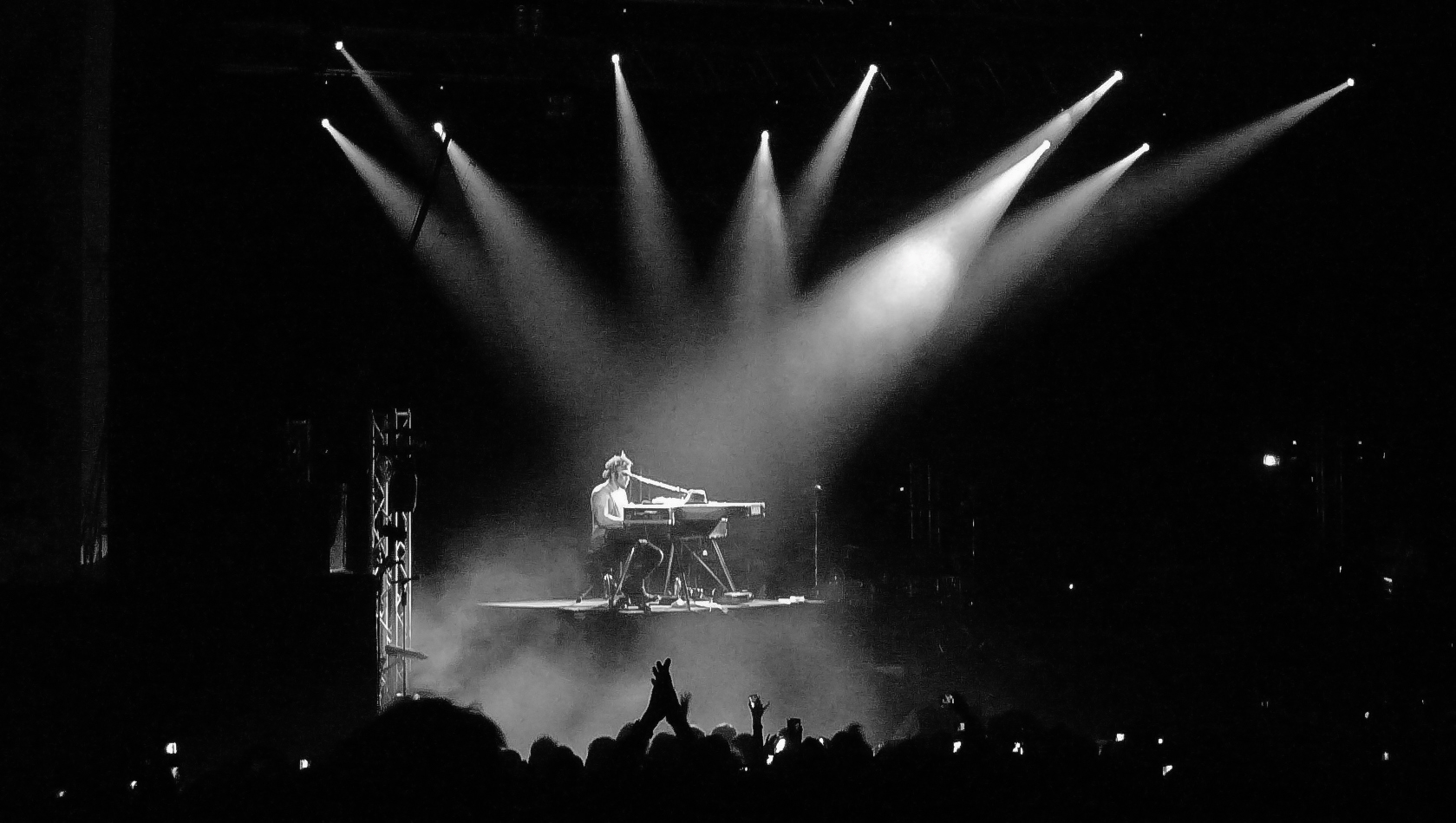
D'Angelo performing at Brixton Academy in London, 2012

No more was revealed on the new album until 2007, when Questlove leaked an unfinished track on radio station Triple J in Australia. Entitled "Really Love", the track was an acoustic-flavored jam with a laid-back swing feel. The leak apparently soured relations between the two. D'Angelo released a CD/DVD compilation album entitled The Best So Far..., first released on June 24, 2008, on Virgin Records. The compilation features songs from his two previous albums, Brown Sugar and Voodoo, as well as rarities and a second disc, a DVD of previously unreleased videos. Around the same time, the compilation was released digitally without the songs featuring Erykah Badu and Raphael Saadiq, under the title Ultimate D'Angelo.

On October 7, 2011, Sony Music announced the disbandment of the RCA Music Group. It included the dissolution of D'Angelo's label, J Records, and its sibling labels, Arista, and Jive Records. With the shutdown, D'Angelo ended up releasing his last piece of material on RCA Records up until his death in 2025.

In late November 2011, D'Angelo announced a series of 2012 European tour dates. The tour kicked off January 26 in Stockholm, Sweden with its final show on February 10. The tour featured a selection of hits from his two previous albums and songs from his third album, which was close to completion. He premiered four songs: "Sugah Daddy", "Ain't That Easy", "Another Life" and "The Charade" which were well received. On June 9, 2012, he joined Questlove for the annual Bonnaroo Music and Arts Festival's Superjam. He did not play any of his original material and this marked the first time in nearly 12 years that he performed on stage in the US. On September 1, 2012, D'Angelo performed at Jay-Z's Made in America festival where he again performed the songs, "The Charade" and "Sugah Daddy".

=== 2014–2020: Black Messiah and "Unshaken" ===
D'Angelo released his third album, Black Messiah, in December 2014. He originally wanted to release Black Messiah in 2015, but the controversial decisions in the Ferguson and Eric Garner cases inspired him to release it earlier. On December 12, 2014, Kevin Liles, D'Angelo's manager, shared a 15-second teaser of the album on YouTube. Two days later, the track "Sugah Daddy", which had been part of D'Angelo's set list since 2012, premiered at 3 am EST and a thousand downloads were available on Red Bull's 20 Before 15 website. After an exclusive listening party in New York produced by Afropunk Festival founder Matthew Morgan and Jocelyn Cooper, Black Messiah was released digitally on December 15 through iTunes, Google Play Music, and Spotify. The album's unexpected release was compared to Beyoncé's self-titled release in 2013. On January 13, 2015, "Really Love" was released to urban adult contemporary radio in the US.

The album was met with universal acclaim from critics; as of 2015, it had a 95/100 mean score on review aggregator Metacritic. In its first week of release, Black Messiah debuted at number 5 on the Billboard 200 and sold 117,000 copies in the United States. In its second week, the album dropped to number 25 on the chart and sold another 40,254 copies. In the United Kingdom, it debuted at number 47 on the UK Albums Chart with first-week sales of 7,423 copies.

D'Angelo supported Black Messiah with a tour called The Second Coming. His band, once called "The Testimony" and later renamed "The Vanguard", included drummer Chris Dave, bassist Pino Palladino, guitarists Jesse Johnson (the Time) and Isaiah Sharkey, vocalists Kendra Foster (sometimes replaced by Joi Gilliam), Jermaine Holmes and Charles "Redd" Middleton, keyboardist Cleo "Pookie" Sample, jazz trumpeter Keyon Harrold, saxophonist Kenneth Whalum manning the horn section, and D'Angelo as the lead vocalist, playing electric grand piano, electric guitar, and even being the band's conductor at certain moments. D'Angelo and the Vanguard's Second Coming Tour commenced in New York City on February 7, 2015, and concluded in Austin, Texas on November 6, 2015, with a total of 57 shows in Europe, Asia and North America. At the 58th Annual Grammy Awards, Black Messiah won Best R&B Album while "Really Love" won Best R&B Song and was nominated for Record of the Year.

In June 2015, D'Angelo confirmed to Rolling Stone that he was working on more material for a new album, calling it "a companion piece" to Black Messiah. D'Angelo performed Prince's "Sometimes It Snows in April" on The Tonight Show Starring Jimmy Fallon in April 2016 accompanied by Maya Rudolph and Gretchen Lieberum as a tribute to the musician, appearing 'overcome with emotion' at the passing of a major influence. D'Angelo contributed to the soundtrack for the 2018 video game Red Dead Redemption 2. He sang on the song "Unshaken" which was produced by Daniel Lanois. He had previously served as a playtester for the game itself due to his love for the series. The game's music team eventually invited him to perform on a song, which was finished in a week. "Unshaken" was later released as a digital single on January 4, 2019.

=== 2021–2025: Final years and upcoming fourth album ===
On February 14, 2021, D'Angelo appeared on Instagram Live to announce that he would be performing at the Apollo Theater on February 27, 2021, in cooperation with the American webcast Verzuz. The event was billed as D'Angelo VS Friends and featured no opponents; instead, D'Angelo performed a solo set with shared performances with his peers and collaborators, Keyon Harrold, Method Man & Redman, and H.E.R.

On June 10, 2021, D'Angelo performed at the 2021 Tribeca Film Festival in New York City for "The Songs of Red Dead Redemption 2". He performed his 2019 single "Unshaken", which was his contribution to the game's soundtrack. D'Angelo performed as a guitarist and the lead vocalist, with soundtrack producer Daniel Lanois, singer Rhiannon Giddens, and members of his band "D'Angelo and the Vanguard", including guitarist Jesse Johnson and vocalists Jermaine Holmes and Charles Middleton by his side. In 2024, he featured alongside Jay-Z on the song "I Want You Forever" from the soundtrack to the film The Book of Clarence. In September 2024, Raphael Saadiq said "D's in a good space," and that D'Angelo was working on a new album.

In November 2026, D'Angelo's first posthumous song release, "Kamikazi", plays in Grand Theft Auto VI, co-produced with Terry Slingbaum.

== Artistry and legacy ==
In a 1995 interview, he discussed the influence that musician Prince had on his approach to recording his debut album, stating "I was one of those guys who read the album credits and I realized that Prince was a true artist. He wrote, produced, and performed, and that's the way I wanted to do it." According to D'Angelo, the hip-hop influence present on the album "came from the Native Tongues movement – Tribe Called Quest, Gang Starr, and Main Source." In a February 1999 interview with music journalist Touré, D'Angelo discussed on his visit to South Carolina, that he "went through this tunnel, through gospel, blues, and a lot of old soul, old James Brown, early, early Sly and the Family Stone, and a lot of Jimi Hendrix". In the same interview, he cited the deaths of rappers Tupac Shakur and The Notorious B.I.G. as having a great effect on him during the period. Collectively referred to by D'Angelo as "Yoda", these influences included soul artist Al Green, funk artist George Clinton, and Afrobeat artist Fela Kuti.

Brown Sugar is widely credited as the album that launched neo-soul, with the term coined soon after by D'Angelo's manager Kedar Massenburg. The style blends R&B with elements from hip-hop, jazz and other styles of music. Pitchfork defined D'Angelo as "the groundbreaking R&B artist who helped define the neo-soul movement across decades". The Washington Post described D'Angelo as the "godfather of neo-soul". D'Angelo distanced himself from the term, saying in 2014, "I never claimed I do neo-soul... When I first came out, I used to always say, 'I do black music. I make black music." In an interview published in 2024, he stated when people would ask what he kind of music he makes, he would reply, "I say soul music. Not neo-soul but soul."

His second album Voodoo (2000) is considered one of the best examples of neo soul music by music critics, while it was listed as 28th on Rolling Stone's 500 Greatest Albums of All Time. The single "Untitled (How Does It Feel)" was listed as second on Rolling Stone's 100 Greatest R&B Songs of the 21st Century. George Clinton compared Voodoo to Marvin Gaye's landmark 1971 album What's Going On. Music critics have called Voodoo a "towering achievement", "masterpiece" and "classic". Voodoo was influential on many jazz musicians in the 21st century.

Black Messiah featured more of a rock and psychedelic sound, and more political lyrics, than previous releases. In 2016, Black Messiah, Beyoncé's Beyoncé (2013), Run the Jewels' Run the Jewels 2 (2014), and Kendrick Lamar's To Pimp a Butterfly (2015) were noted by The Yale Herald as laying the groundwork down for the politically charged releases that happened in 2016, which included Rihanna's Anti, Kanye West's The Life of Pablo, and Beyonce's "Formation".

In 2023, Rolling Stone ranked D'Angelo at number 75 on its list of the "200 Greatest Singers of All Time". In 2025 Billboard listed the singer as the 45th on the list of "The 75th Best R&B Artist of all Time" in 2025. Several publications and music magazines listed D'Angelo in their list of the greatest R&B and soul artists, including Forbes (2nd), Medium (22nd) and Essence (27th).

Tyler, the Creator said his "musical DNA" was shaped by D'Angelo's work. Chaka Khan called D'Angelo a "genius". George Clinton praised him as a worthy successor to soul legend Marvin Gaye. Prince said of D'Angelo, "I crave great musicianship, and I don't care who provides it... I've got no problems saying I dig D'Angelo." Rolling Stone said all three of D'Angelo's albums are revered as "contemporary classics".

== Personal life ==
D'Angelo never married. In the 1990s, he dated the soul singer Angie Stone. She was his muse for his Brown Sugar album and he helped her produce her debut album Black Diamond, released in 1999. Angie Stone and D'Angelo had a son together, Michael Archer Jr, born in 1997 (known professionally as Swayvo Twain). D'Angelo also had two other children: a daughter, Imani Archer, born in October 1999, and a son, born in 2010.

In the early 2000s, D'Angelo struggled with depression as well as drug and alcohol addiction. One notable incident occurred in 2005 when he was arrested on a DUI charge and also for possession of cocaine and marijuana. A week after being sentenced on the charges in September 2005, he was involved in a car crash that was rumored to have left him critically injured.

== Death and tributes ==
D’Angelo died from pancreatic cancer in New York City, on the morning of October 14, 2025, at the age of 51. He had been working on his fourth album with Raphael Saadiq. A family member told People that D'Angelo had been in hospice for two weeks, and had been hospitalized for months. Stone died in a car accident on March 1, 2025, only seven months before D'Angelo. Archer Jr. spoke publicly about the grief of losing both his parents within the same year. D'Angelo was buried at Richmond's Mount Calvary Cemetery, following a service at Saint Paul's Baptist Church in Henrico, Virginia, on November 1, 2025. Stevie Wonder, the Soultronics, and the Vanguard performed musical tributes during the celebration of life service.

Numerous public figures offered tributes to D'Angelo. His collaborator and hit single duet partner Lauryn Hill said, "I regret not having more time with you." The song they sang together, "Nothing Even Matters", was included on President Barack Obama's first summer playlist in 2015; Obama expressed sadness at D'Angelo's death, saying, "Michelle and I are thinking of his family, and all those who loved and admired him." Actor Jamie Foxx wrote, "Your music and your impression will be felt for generations to come." Musicians who paid tribute include Beyoncé; Tyler, the Creator; Nile Rodgers, Missy Elliott, George Clinton, and Doja Cat.

== Discography ==
Studio albums

- Brown Sugar (1995)
- Voodoo (2000)
- Black Messiah (with the Vanguard) (2014)

== Tours ==
- Brown Sugar Tour (1996)
- The Voodoo World Tour (2000)
- Occupy Music Tour (2012)
- The Liberation Tour (2012)
- The Second Coming Tour (2015)

== Awards and nominations ==
=== American Music Awards ===
Year	Nominee / work	Award	Result	Ref.
1997	Himself	Favorite Soul/R&B Male Artist	Nominated	
1997	Himself	Favorite Soul/R&B New Artist	Won	
2001	Himself	Favorite Soul/R&B Male Artist	Nominated	
2015	Black Messiah	Favorite Soul/R&B Album	Nominated	

=== Blockbuster Entertainment Awards ===
Year	Nominee / work	Award	Result	Ref.
2001	Himself	Favorite Male Artist - R&B	Nominated	

=== Grammy Awards ===
Year	Nominee / work	Award	Result	Ref.
1996	Brown Sugar	Best R&B Album	Nominated	
1996	"Brown Sugar"	Best R&B Song	Nominated	
1996	"Brown Sugar"	Best Male R&B Vocal Performance	Nominated	
1997	"Lady"	Best Male R&B Vocal Performance	Nominated	
1999	"Nothing Even Matters" (with Lauryn Hill)	Best R&B Performance by a Duo or Group with Vocal	Nominated	
2001	Voodoo	Best R&B Album	Won	
2001	"Untitled (How Does It Feel)"	Best Male R&B Vocal Performance	Won	
2001	"Untitled (How Does It Feel)"	Best R&B Song	Nominated	
2003	"Be Here" (with Raphael Saadiq)	Best R&B Song	Nominated	
2003	"Be Here" (with Raphael Saadiq)	Best Urban/Alternative Performance	Nominated	
2004	"I'll Stay" (with Roy Hargrove)	Best R&B Performance by a Duo or Group with Vocals	Nominated	
2016	Black Messiah	Best R&B Album	Won	
2016	"Really Love"	Record of the Year	Nominated	
2016	"Really Love"	Best R&B Song	Won	

=== MTV Europe Music Awards ===
Year	Nominee / work	Award	Result	Ref.
1996	"Lady"	MTV Amour	Nominated	

=== MTV Video Music Awards ===
Year	Nominee / work	Award	Result	Ref.
1996	"Brown Sugar"	Best R&B Video	Nominated	
2000	"Untitled (How Does It Feel)"	Video of the Year	Nominated	
2000	"Untitled (How Does It Feel)"	Best Male Video	Nominated	
2000	"Untitled (How Does It Feel)"	Best R&B Video	Nominated	
2000	"Untitled (How Does It Feel)"	Best Direction	Nominated	

=== My VH1 Music Awards ===
Year	Nominee / work	Award	Result	Ref.
2000	"Untitled (How Does It Feel)"	Sexxxiest Video	Nominated	

=== Pollstar Concert Industry Awards ===
Year	Nominee / work	Award	Result	Ref.
1996	Himself	Best New Rap/Dance Artist Tour	Nominated	

=== Rober Awards Music Prize ===
Year	Nominee / work	Award	Result	Ref.
2012	Voodoo	Best Reissue	Nominated	
2012	Himself	Best Live Artist	Nominated	
2015	Himself	Best Live Artist	Nominated	
2015	Himself	Best Group or Duo	Nominated	
2015	Himself	Comeback of the Year	Nominated	
2015	Himself	Best R&B	Won	
2015	Black Messiah	Album of the Year	Nominated	

=== Teen Choice Awards ===
Year	Nominee / work	Award	Result	Ref.
2000	Himself	Choice Male Artist	Nominated	
2000	Voodoo	Choice Album	Nominated	
2000	"Untitled (How Does It Feel)"	Choice R&B/Hip-Hop Track	Nominated	

== Notes ==
Preceded by Blake Shelton	Saturday Night Live musical guest January 31, 2015	Succeeded by Alabama Shakes
