= The Sun Season =

Studio album by Dara Tucker
- Released: July 8, 2014
- Recorded: October 7–9, 2013; Samurai Hotel Studios
- Genre: Jazz
- Label: Watchman Music
- Producer: Greg Bryant

Dara Tucker chronology
Dara Tucker Live (2013)	The Sun Season (2014)

The Sun Season is the third studio project from jazz singer/songwriter Dara Tucker. It was released on July 8, 2014. It features ten songs written by Dara Tucker, and two standards: "Over the Rainbow" and "The Nearness of You".

== Album history ==
The album's ten original songs were written over a period of ten years, starting with Tucker's time in Interlaken, Switzerland. The album contains a "sun" theme. Tucker states that she finds inspiration from the sun, and often felt compelled to write about it. "Beautiful Sun" was written by Tucker in 2003 to celebrate the beauty of nature and its ability to invigorate and give life. Several of the album's songs were composed over a period of several years. Many of the songs' themes center around finding beauty and joy in communing with nature. The Sun Season contains a blend of Tucker's influences, including jazz, singer-songwriter, pop music, gospel music, Broadway theater, R&B and soul music.

The album features Peter Bernstein, Helen Sung, John Ellis, Alan Ferber, Donald Edwards and Greg Bryant. It was recorded at Samurai Hotel Studios by David Stoller from October 7–9, 2013, and mixed and mastered in Nashville, Tennessee by Jon Estes. It was produced by Greg Bryant for Watchman Music.

== Track listing ==
1. Time Is on Our Side
2. Sometimes Love
3. See It Always
4. Naive
5. Beautiful Sun
6. The Morning Sun
7. Giants
8. Waiting for the Sun
9. Sun, See Through Me
10. Over the Rainbow
11. The Sun Suite (See You in the Sun)
12. The Nearness of You
