= Dara Tucker =

American singer and composer

Dara Starr Tucker
- Born: Tulsa, Oklahoma, U.S.
- Genres: Jazz, soul, gospel, Broadway
- Occupations: Singer, songwriter
- Instruments: Vocals, piano
- Years active: 2000s-present
- Label: Watchman Music
- Website: darastarrtucker.com

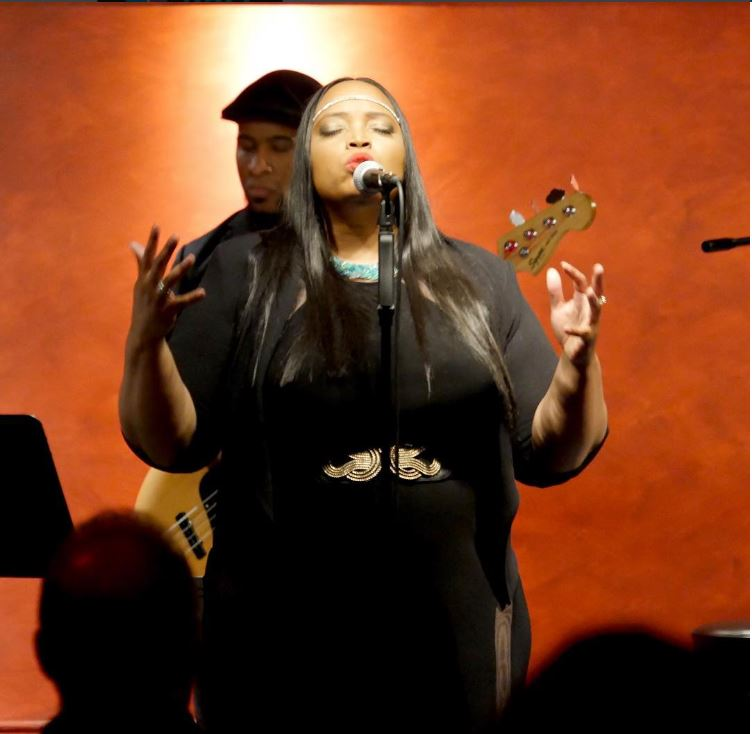
Dara Starr Tucker at the Nashville Jazz Workshop, 2017

Dara Starr Tucker is an American singer, songwriter, social commentator and satirist.

Tucker has released four studio albums: All Right Now (2009), Soul Said Yes (2011) The Sun Season (2014), and Oklahoma Rain (2017), as well as a limited-release, live album, Dara Tucker Live in 2013. She was named Jazz Vocalist of the Year at the 2016 and 2017 Nashville Industry Music Awards. In 2017, the second single from Oklahoma Rain, "Radio", was named Song of the Year at the Nashville Industry Music Awards. Oklahoma Rain won Jazz Album of the Year. Tucker has performed internationally with her ensemble since 2009. She appeared on the Tavis Smiley Show in 2015 and was the opening act for Gregory Porter in 2016. She won the silver medal in the American Traditions Vocal Competition in 2017.

She has shared the stage with Lonnie Smith, 7-string guitarist Charlie Hunter, and pianist Johnny O'Neal at The Blue Note in New York City, The San Jose Jazz Festival, Smoke Jazz and Supper Club in New York City, Sculler's in Boston, the Oklahoma Jazz Hall of Fame, and Snug Harbor in New Orleans. In November 2016, she shared the stage with Vince Gill and the Time Jumpers. She has recorded with guitarist Peter Bernstein, guitarist Charlie Hunter, pianist Helen Sung, trombonist Alan Ferber, saxophonist John Ellis and drummer Donald Edwards. She is a touring member of the Charlie Hunter Trio, with whom she has performed throughout the Midwest and east coast.

== Background ==
Dara Starr Tucker was born in Tulsa, Oklahoma, as the third of seven children to music minister and gospel recording artist Doyle Tucker and singer Lynda Tucker. She started out singing harmony at the age of 4 with her brothers and sisters, and began playing the piano at age 8. She traveled the country singing with her family for most of her childhood. Dara's family spent time in Spokane, Washington, Detroit, Michigan, Fayetteville, Arkansas, Pasadena, California and Baltimore, Maryland. She and her brothers and sisters, known as "The Tuckers", were known for their rich harmonies and seamless blend. Dara received her degree in international business and German studies. After graduating, Tucker worked for a few years in the field of international business. She then moved to Interlaken, Switzerland to study German while aupairing.

== Musical career ==
Tucker began songwriting while living in Switzerland in 2003, and in 2004, moved to Nashville to pursue a career as a singer-songwriter. She recorded the first of her albums, "All Right Now" in 2009. It featured mostly Great American Songbook standards. Her second album, "Soul Said Yes" (2011) was a blend of R&B, jazz and Gospel, and featured seven-string guitarist, Charlie Hunter. It made Amazon.com's top 10 R&B chart within a few weeks of its release. Two of Tucker's own compositions were included on this project – "The Space" and "Partly Cloudy."

Tucker's third release, "The Sun Season" (2014) was recorded in Astoria, Queens, New York. Ten of the twelve songs on "The Sun Season" were written by Tucker. The album features Peter Bernstein on guitar, Helen Sung on piano, Donald Edwards on drums, John Ellis on saxophone, Alan Ferber on trombone and Greg Bryant on bass. It reached number 62 on the JazzWeek charts on September 22, 2014.

On June 29, 2015, Tucker was interviewed by Tavis Smiley for his PBS television show. On the show, she performed an original song she wrote with her sister, Diamond Tucker, entitled "Giants" from The Sun Season. Dara Tucker on Tavis Smiley. She opened for Gregory Porter in Nashville, TN on June 4, 2016, at the Tennessee Performing Arts Center. Tucker is a frequent performer at the Nashville Jazz Workshop, and Rudy's Jazz Club and performed her New York CD release show at "Smoke Jazz and Supper Club" on New York City's upper west side in August 2014.

Tucker was a finalist in the Mid-Atlantic Jazz Festival's vocal competition in 2016.

Tucker won the silver medal at the "American Traditions" vocal competition in Savannah, GA in February 2017. This competition requires singers to perform in 9 separate genres. She also won the "Ben Tucker Jazz Award" for her performance of The Nearness of You, which was presented to her by jazz bassist Ben Tucker's widow.

Tucker released a full-length project on April 30, 2017, called "Oklahoma Rain", which chronicles her journey of love, loss and healing in the wake of losing both her parents in 2014. Two singles have been released from the CD – "Moving On" and "Radio" for which she self-produced a music video. Radio Music Video "Radio" rose to No. 5 on the UK soul charts, and was named, "Song of the Year" at the 2017 Nashville Industry Music Awards. "Oklahoma Rain" was named "Jazz Album of the Year" at the Nashville Industry Music Awards. "Oklahoma Rain" received favorable reviews from numerous publications, including the London Jazz Review Soul and Jazz and Funk Soulwalking Lemonwire and The Tennessee Tribune.

In 2018, Tucker embarked on a set of appearances as a touring member of the Charlie Hunter Trio. She has performed with the group throughout the Midwest. She will perform several duo shows with Charlie Hunter in 2018 opening for the California Honeydrops on the East Coast.

== Other ==
Tucker is an avid freelance documentary filmmaker. She produces a docu-series on Nashville musicians called, "Music City Select" through her production company, "GoldenTime Films". She is also a contributor to the Huffington Post where she writes essays on her personal experiences as a minority and a woman in the entertainment business. Her article, "Here's to the Ladies Who Cuss" was featured on The Huffington Post Voices homepage.

== Musical influences ==
Tucker counts among her influences: Lynda Tucker, Doyle Tucker, Mel Tormé, James Taylor, Stevie Wonder & Nancy Wilson.

== Discography ==
=== Studio albums ===
- 2009: All Right Now
- 2011: Soul Said Yes
- 2014: The Sun Season
- 2017: Oklahoma Rain
- 2023: Dara Starr Tucker

Live albums

- 2013 Dara Tucker Live

== Awards and honors ==
- 2016 Nashville Industry Music Awards Artist of the Year (Nominee)
- 2016 Nashville Industry Music Awards Jazz Vocalist of the Year (Winner)
- 2016 Mid-Atlantic Jazz Festival Vocal Competition Finalist
- 2017 Nashville Industry Music Awards Song of the Year – Radio (Winner)
- 2017 Nashville Industry Music Awards Jazz Album Of the Year – Oklahoma Rain (Winner)
- 2017 Nashville Industry Music Awards Jazz Vocalist of the Year (Winner)
- 2017 American Traditions Ben Tucker Jazz Award
- 2017 American Traditions Vocal Competition Silver Medalist
- 2018 American Traditions Johnny Mercer Award
- 2018 American Traditions Semifinalist
