= John Hickenlooper =

American politician (born 1952)

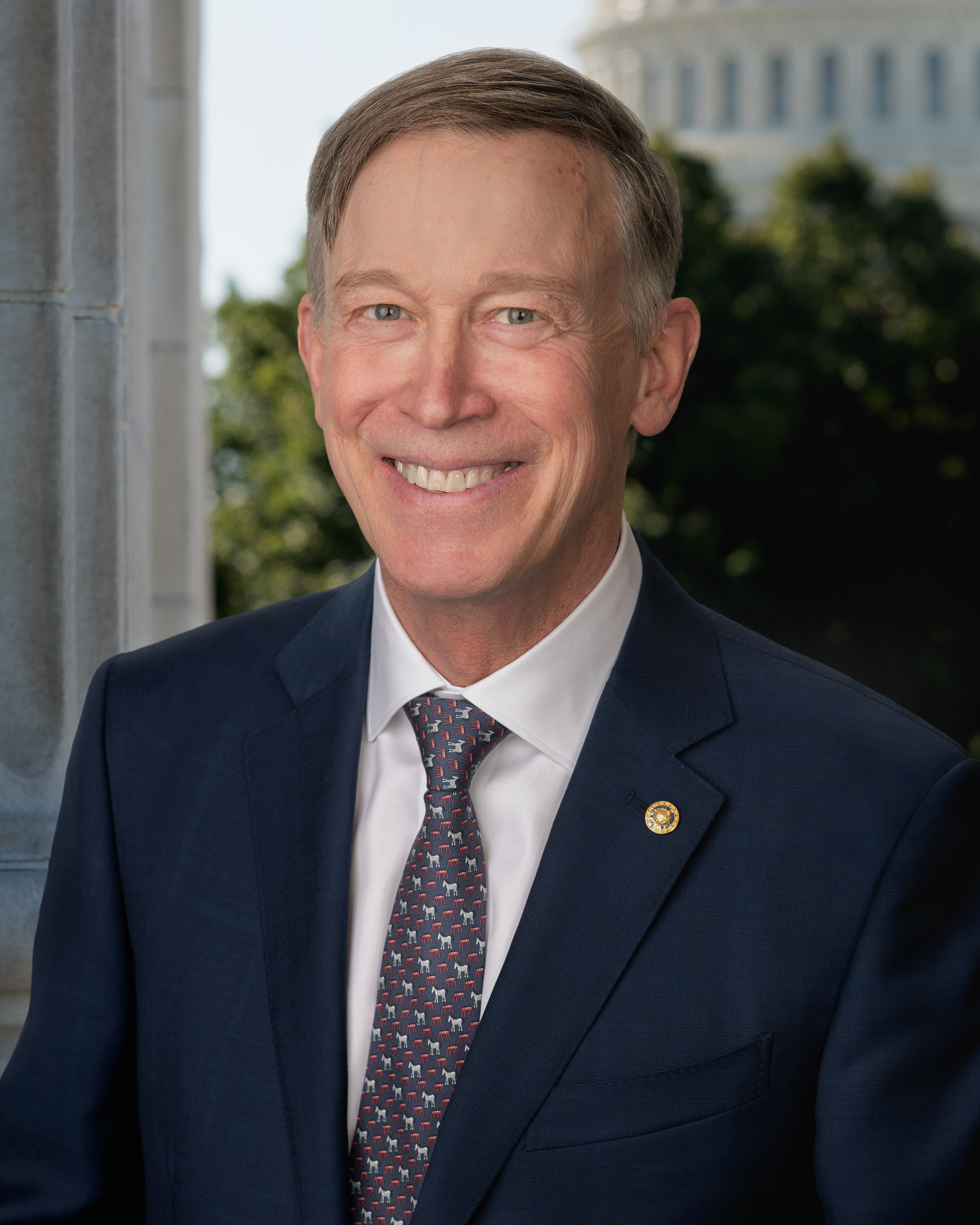
- Official portrait, 2021

United States Senator from Colorado
- Incumbent
- Assumed office January 3, 2021 Serving with Michael Bennet
- Preceded by: Cory Gardner

42nd Governor of Colorado
- In office January 11, 2011 – January 8, 2019
- Lieutenant: Joe García; Donna Lynne
- Preceded by: Bill Ritter
- Succeeded by: Jared Polis

Chair of the National Governors Association
- In office July 13, 2014 – July 25, 2015
- Preceded by: Mary Fallin
- Succeeded by: Gary Herbert

43rd Mayor of Denver
- In office July 21, 2003 – January 11, 2011
- Preceded by: Wellington Webb
- Succeeded by: Bill Vidal

Personal details
- Born: John Wright Hickenlooper Jr. February 7, 1952 (age 74) Narberth, Pennsylvania, U.S.
- Party: Democratic
- Spouses: Helen Thorpe (m. 2002; div. 2015) Robin Pringle (m. 2016)
- Children: 2
- Relatives: Smith Hickenlooper (grandfather); Bourke B. Hickenlooper (grand-uncle); Andrew Hickenlooper (great-grandfather); George Hickenlooper (cousin)
- Education: Wesleyan University (BA, MS)
- Website: Senate website Campaign website
- John Hickenlooper's voice John Hickenlooper on the Club Q Nightclub shooting Recorded November 30, 2022

John Wright Hickenlooper Jr. (/ˈhɪkənluːpər/ HIK-ən-loop-ər; born February 7, 1952) is an American politician, geologist, and businessman serving as the junior United States senator from Colorado since 2021. A member of the Democratic Party, he served as the 42nd governor of Colorado from 2011 to 2019 and as the 43rd mayor of Denver from 2003 to 2011.

Born in Narberth, Pennsylvania, Hickenlooper is a graduate of Wesleyan University. After a career as a petroleum geologist, in 1988 he co-founded the Wynkoop Brewing Company, one of the first brewpubs in the U.S. Hickenlooper was elected the 43rd mayor of Denver in 2003, serving two terms. In 2005, TIME named him one of America's five best big-city mayors. After incumbent governor Bill Ritter said that he would not seek reelection, Hickenlooper ran for governor in 2010, winning the Democratic primary uncontested and defeating Constitution Party nominee Tom Tancredo and Republican Party nominee Dan Maes with 51% of the vote. He was reelected in 2014 with 49% of the vote, defeating Republican Bob Beauprez.

As governor, he introduced universal background checks and banned high-capacity magazines in the wake of the 2012 Aurora, Colorado, shooting. He expanded Medicaid under the provisions of the Affordable Care Act, halving the rate of uninsured people in the state. Having initially opposed marijuana legalization, he has gradually come to support it.

He sought the Democratic nomination for U.S. president in 2019 but dropped out before primaries were held. He subsequently ran for the U.S. Senate, winning the Democratic nomination and the general election, defeating incumbent Republican Cory Gardner. At 68, Hickenlooper became the oldest first-term senator to represent Colorado. He would subsequently be re-elected in 2026.

== Early life, education, and career ==
Hickenlooper was born in Narberth, Pennsylvania, a Main Line suburb of Philadelphia. He is the son of Anne Doughten (née Morris) Kennedy and John Wright Hickenlooper. His great-grandfather Andrew Hickenlooper was a Union general, and his grandfather Smith Hickenlooper was a United States federal judge. A cousin, Bourke B. Hickenlooper, a Republican known as "Hick", was governor of Iowa from 1943 to 1945 and a U.S. senator from Iowa from 1945 to 1969.

Hickenlooper was raised by his mother from a young age after his father's death. He is a 1970 graduate of The Haverford School, an independent boys school in Haverford, Pennsylvania, where he was a National Merit Scholarship semifinalist. New York magazine reported that at this time his heroes were Neil Young, Ray Davies, and Gordie Howe, and that his pet peeves were violence and "beer boys."

Hickenlooper attended Wesleyan University, where he received a B.A. in English in 1974 and a master's degree in geology in 1980. He recounted first smoking pot when he was 16 and using lithium carbonate capsules to go through with his final exam. In 1989, Hickenlooper was arrested in Denver for "driving while impaired" and did community service.

Hickenlooper worked as a geologist in Colorado for Buckhorn Petroleum in the early 1980s. When Buckhorn was sold, Hickenlooper was laid off in 1986. He and five business partners opened the Wynkoop Brewing Company brewpub in October 1988 after raising startup funds from dozens of friends and family along with a Denver economic development office loan. The Wynkoop was one of the nation's first brewpubs. By 1996, Westword reported that Denver had more brewpubs per capita than any other city. Hickenlooper claims his restaurant was the first in Colorado to offer a designated driver program.

== Mayor of Denver (2003–2011) ==
In 2003, Hickenlooper ran for mayor of Denver. Campaigning on his business experience, he developed a series of creative television ads that separated him from the rest of the crowded field, including one in which he addressed unhappiness over a recent increase in parking rates by walking the streets to "feed" meters. He won the election and in July 2003 he took office as Denver's 43rd mayor. Time named him one of America's five best big-city mayors in 2005.

On taking office, Hickenlooper inherited a "$70 million budget deficit, the worst in city history", which he was able to eliminate in his first term "without major service cuts or layoffs", according to Time. He won bipartisan support for a multibillion-dollar mass public transit project, intended in part to attract investment and funded by a voter-approved sales tax increase.

In 2003, Hickenlooper announced a ten-year plan to end homelessness in Denver, citing it as one of the issues that prompted him to run for mayor. 280 U.S. cities announced similar plans. The effort did not end homelessness in Denver, and in 2015 Denver's city auditor "released a scathing audit faulting the plan's implementation." The head of the agency responsible defended the program, saying it was "still housing 300–400 people a month in varying ways", while Hickenlooper argued that the point of such an ambitious target was to focus attention and resources on the problem. In his governor's budget request for 2017–18, he asked lawmakers to allocate $12.3 million from taxes on marijuana to building homes for chronically homeless people.

Hickenlooper established the Denver Scholarship Foundation, providing needs-based college scholarships to high school graduates.

In May 2007, Hickenlooper was reelected with 88% of the vote. He resigned as mayor just before his inauguration as governor.

=== 2008 Democratic National Convention ===
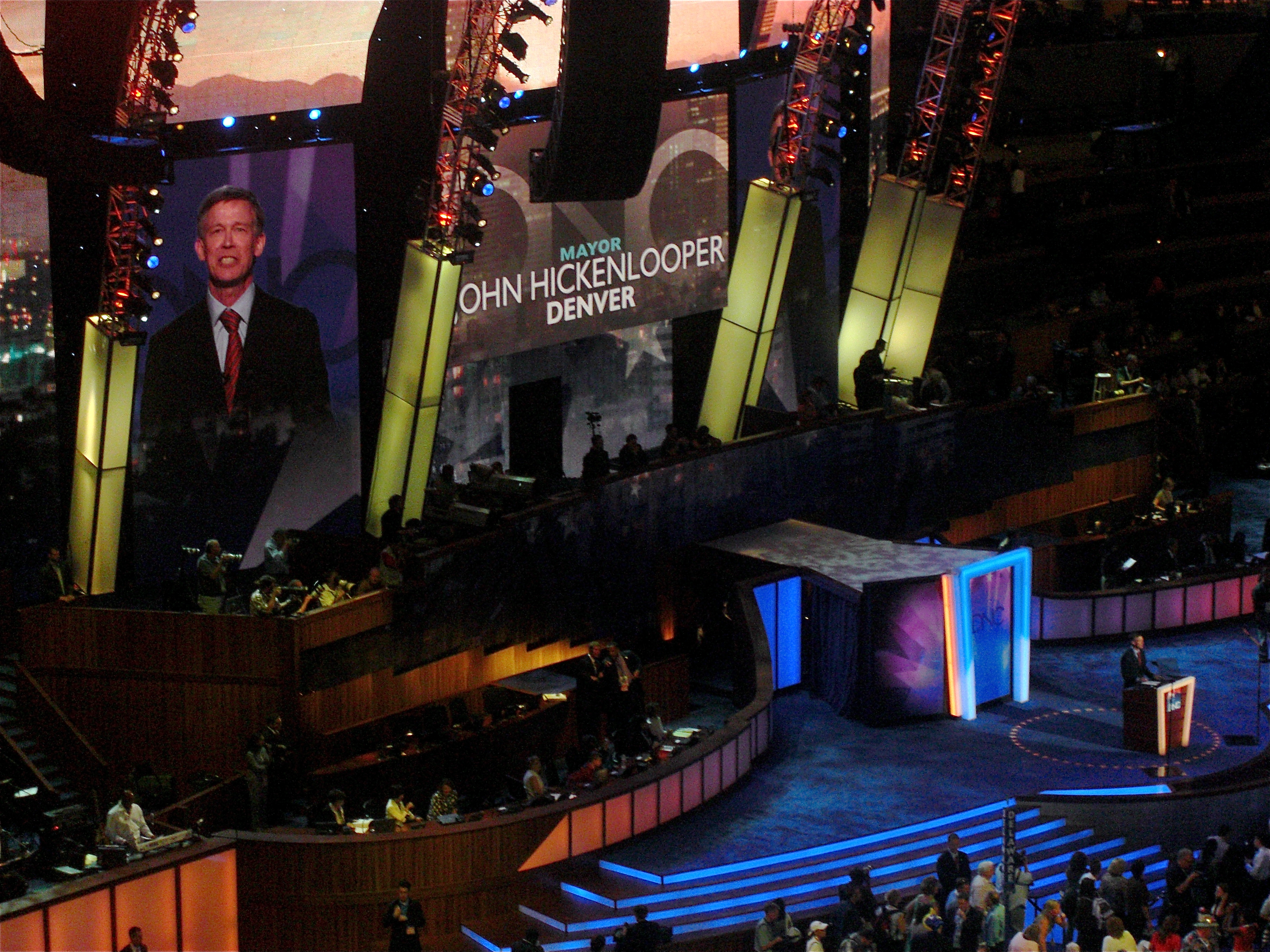
Hickenlooper speaks on the first day of the 2008 Democratic National Convention in Denver.

Hickenlooper was an executive member of the Denver 2008 Convention Host Committee and helped lead the successful campaign for Denver to host the 2008 Democratic National Convention, which was also the centennial anniversary of the city's hosting of the 1908 Democratic National Convention.

In a controversial move decried by critics as breaching partisan ethics, the Hickenlooper administration arranged for the DNC host committee, a private nonprofit organization, to get untaxed fuel from Denver city-owned pumps, saving them $0.404 per US gallon ($0.107/L). Once the arrangement came to light, the host committee agreed to pay taxes on the fuel already consumed and on all future fuel purchases. Also, Coors Brewing Company, based in Golden, Colorado, used "waste beer" to provide the ethanol to power a fleet of FlexFuel vehicles used during the convention.

== Governor of Colorado (2011–2019) ==
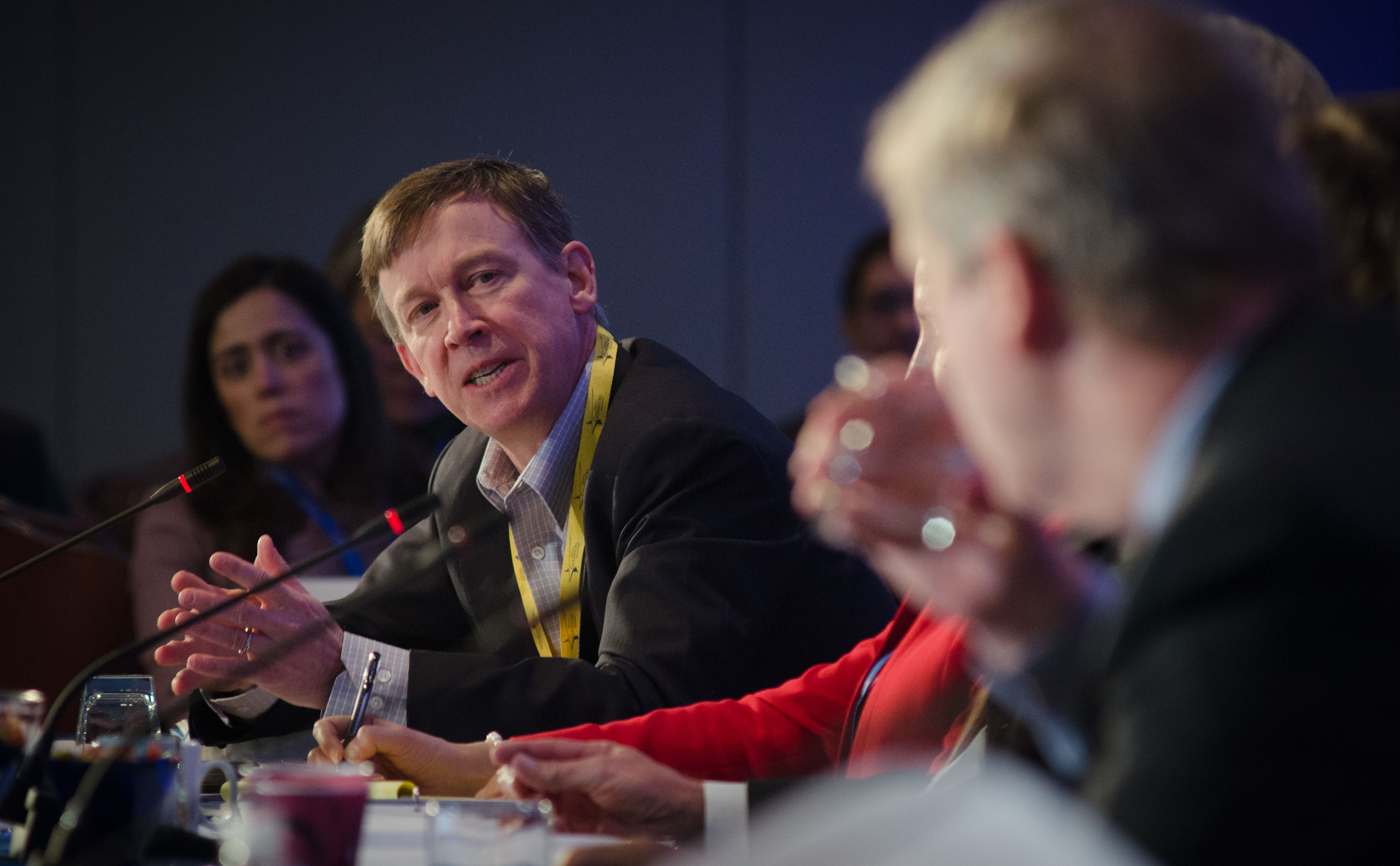
Hickenlooper in February 2012

=== Elections ===
==== 2010 ====
Hickenlooper was viewed as a possible contender for governor of Colorado in the November 2006 election to replace term-limited Republican governor Bill Owens. Despite a "Draft Hick" campaign, he announced on February 6, 2006, that he would not run for governor. Later, he supported Democratic candidate Bill Ritter, Denver's former district attorney, who was subsequently elected.

After Ritter announced on January 6, 2010, that he would step down at the end of his term, Hickenlooper was cited as a potential candidate for governor. He said that if Salazar mounted a bid for governor, he would likely not challenge him in a Democratic primary. On January 7, 2010, Salazar confirmed that he would not run for governor in 2010 and endorsed Hickenlooper. On January 12, 2010, media outlets reported that Hickenlooper would begin a campaign for governor. On August 5, 2010, he selected CSU-Pueblo president Joseph A. Garcia as his running mate. Hickenlooper was elected with 51% of the vote, ahead of former congressman Tom Tancredo, running on the American Constitution Party ticket, who finished with 36.4% of the vote.

==== 2014 ====
Hickenlooper won a tightly contested gubernatorial election with 49% of the vote to Republican businessman and former congressman Bob Beauprez's 46%.

=== Tenure ===
On January 11, 2011, Hickenlooper was sworn in as the 42nd Governor of Colorado after winning by 15 points. He was the second Denver mayor ever elected governor. His victory was a landslide despite Democrats' poor results overall in the 2010 elections. Republicans flipped twelve governorships nationwide in 2010. NPR described Hickenlooper as having a "pro-business centrist profile" and as "known to try to build consensus and compromise on tough issues", while 5280 called him as "one of those unicorn-rare, truly apolitical politicians", noting support from business leaders and some Republicans.

On December 4, 2012, Hickenlooper was elected to serve as vice chair of the Democratic Governors Association.

On March 18, 2016, Hickenlooper signed bill HB 16–1284 into law, punishing companies for boycotting Israel.

On August 25, 2017, it was reported that Republican Governor of Ohio John Kasich was considering the possibility of a 2020 unity ticket to run against Donald Trump, with Hickenlooper as vice president.

Constitutionally limited to two consecutive terms, Hickenlooper could not run for governor in 2018.

On June 5, 2020, the Colorado Independent Ethics Commission fined Hickenlooper $2,750 for twice violating Colorado's gift ban as governor. Hickenlooper received a flight on a private jet owned by homebuilder and donor Larry Mizel, the founder of MDC Holdings. He also received private security and a ride to the airport in a Maserati limousine on a trip to the Bilderberg Meetings in Italy. The state spent an estimated $127,000 in attorney's fees investigating the violation.

== 2020 presidential campaign ==
Hickenlooper 2020
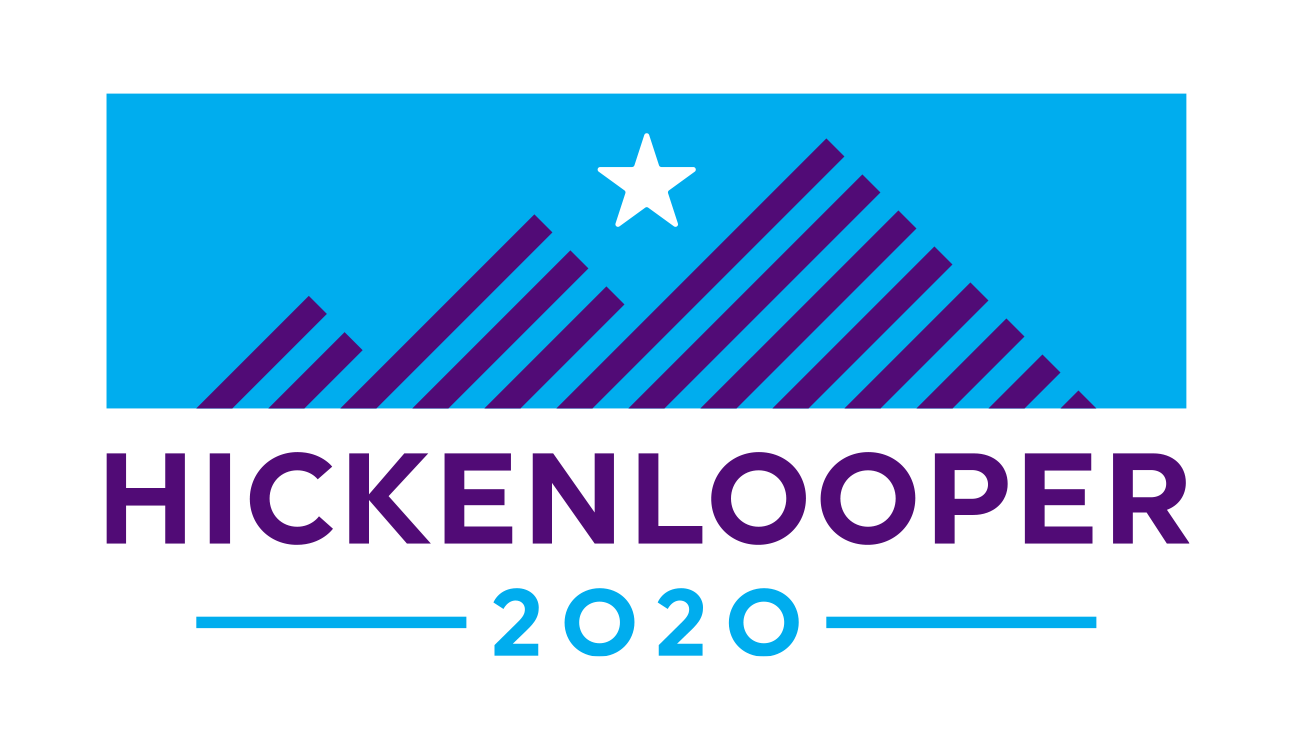
- Campaign: 2020 United States presidential election (Democratic Party primaries)
- Candidate: John Hickenlooper; Governor of Colorado (2011–2019); Mayor of Denver (2003–2011)
- Affiliation: Democratic Party
- Status: Suspended
- Announced: March 4, 2019
- Launched: March 7, 2019
- Suspended: August 15, 2019
- Headquarters: Denver, Colorado
- Key people: Brad Komar (campaign manager)
- Receipts: US$3,508,447.82 (September 30, 2019)
- Slogan: Stand Tall

Website
- www.hickenlooper.com

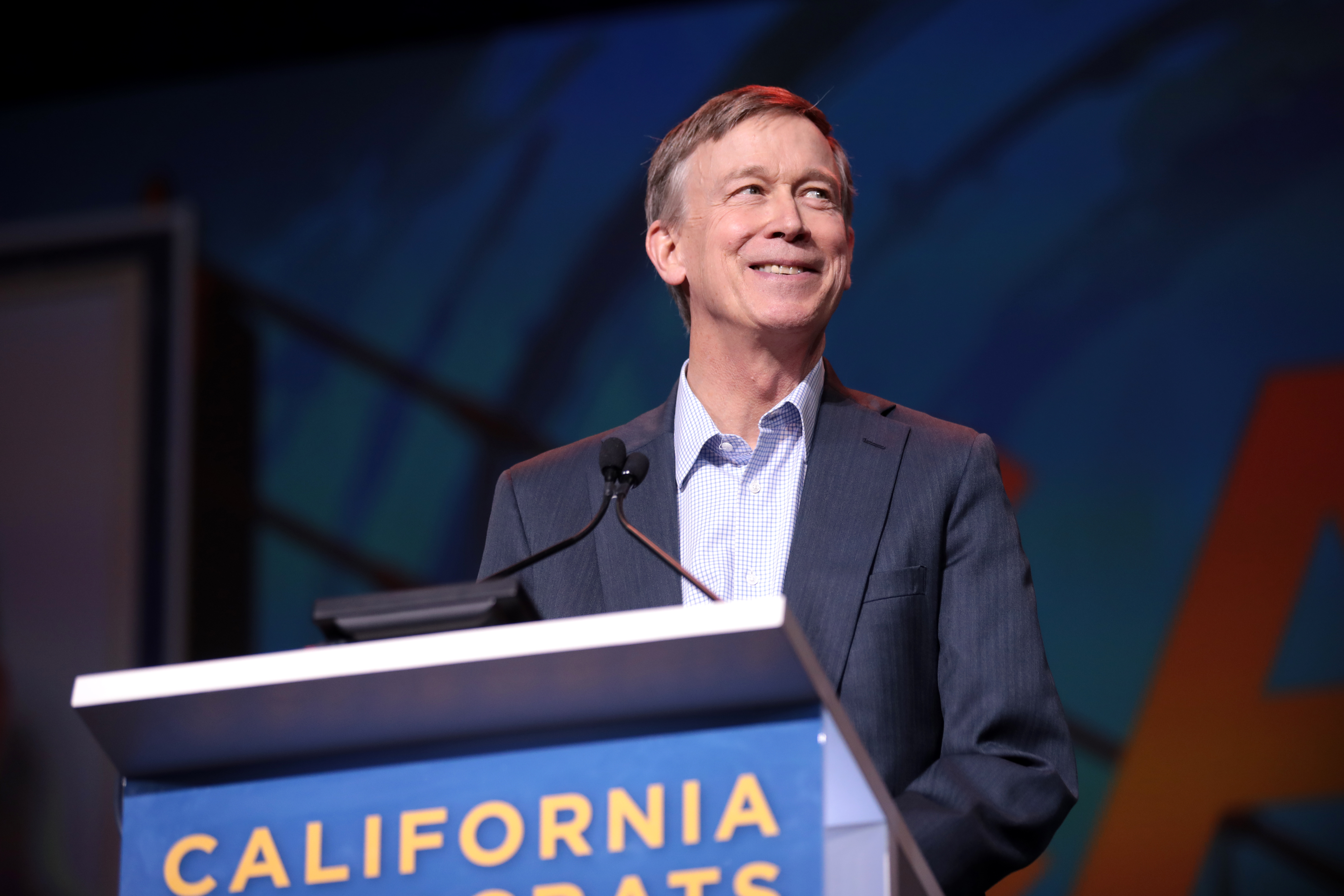
Hickenlooper speaking to the California Democratic Party State Convention in June 2019.

On March 4, 2019, Hickenlooper announced his campaign to seek the Democratic nomination for president of the United States in 2020. His candidacy had been a matter of media speculation for months before his announcement. Hickenlooper formally launched his campaign on March 7, 2019, in Denver, Colorado. A video titled "Stand Tall" was released to announce the campaign and outline his reasons for running. Hickenlooper formed Giddy Up PAC in 2018 in anticipation of a presidential campaign, raising more than $600,000 in the midterm cycle. The campaign struggled to gain traction in the crowded and increasingly competitive Democratic presidential primary field, and Hickenlooper ended his candidacy in a YouTube video on August 15, 2019, and instead began exploring a run for the U.S. Senate.

== U.S. Senator (2021–present) ==
=== Elections ===
==== 2020 ====
Hickenlooper had previously been considered the front-runner to fill the United States Senate seat to be vacated by Ken Salazar upon his confirmation as Secretary of the Interior in the Obama administration. He confirmed his interest in the seat. But on January 3, 2009, Governor Bill Ritter appointed Denver Public Schools Superintendent Michael Bennet to the position. Bennet previously served as Hickenlooper's chief of staff.

In a YouTube video published to his campaign channel on August 22, 2019, Hickenlooper announced that he would run for the U.S. Senate in 2020. Some preliminary polling data showed him with a substantial lead against incumbent Republican Senator Cory Gardner. Hickenlooper was also leading the Democratic primary field by a fairly wide margin before he announced. He was quickly endorsed by the Democratic Senatorial Campaign Committee, a move protested by candidates already running before Hickenlooper's entry.

On June 30, Hickenlooper defeated former state house Speaker Andrew Romanoff in the Democratic primary, winning the nomination to challenge one-term incumbent Republican Cory Gardner. He defeated Gardner by 9 points and took office on January 3, 2021.

At 68, Hickenlooper was the oldest elected freshman U.S. senator from Colorado.

==== 2026 ====
Hickenlooper received 55% of the vote and won the 2026 Democratic primary against State Senator Julie Gonzales on June 30, 2026. He faces Republican State Senator Mark Baisley in the general election.

=== Tenure ===
==== January 6 Capitol attack ====
In the wake of the 2021 storming of the United States Capitol, Hickenlooper said he would support efforts to remove Donald Trump from office, in line with most of his party.

==== STOCK Act violations ====
In May 2022, an analysis by the nonprofit news organization Sludge found that Hickenlooper had violated the Stop Trading on Congressional Knowledge (STOCK) Act of 2012 by failing to disclose within 45 days five stock trades his household made, which were worth between $565,000 and $1.3 million. A June 2022 analysis by Business Insider found that Hickenlooper had again violated the STOCK Act by disclosing stock trades made by his wife between two and 14 months later than required by law, including purchases worth between $516,006 and $1.2 million and sales worth between $130,004 and $300,000.

=== Committee assignments ===
- Committee on Energy and Natural Resources
  - Subcommittee on Energy
  - Subcommittee on Public Lands, Forests, and Mining
  - Subcommittee on Water and Power
- Committee on Health, Education, Labor and Pensions
  - Subcommittee on Children and Families
  - Subcommittee on Employment and Workplace Safety (Chair)
- Committee on Commerce, Science, and Transportation
  - Subcommittee on Aviation Safety, Operations, and Innovation
  - Subcommittee on Communications, Media, and Broadband
  - Subcommittee on Space and Science (Chair)
  - Subcommittee on Tourism, Trade and Export Promotion
- Committee on Small Business and Entrepreneurship

== Political positions ==
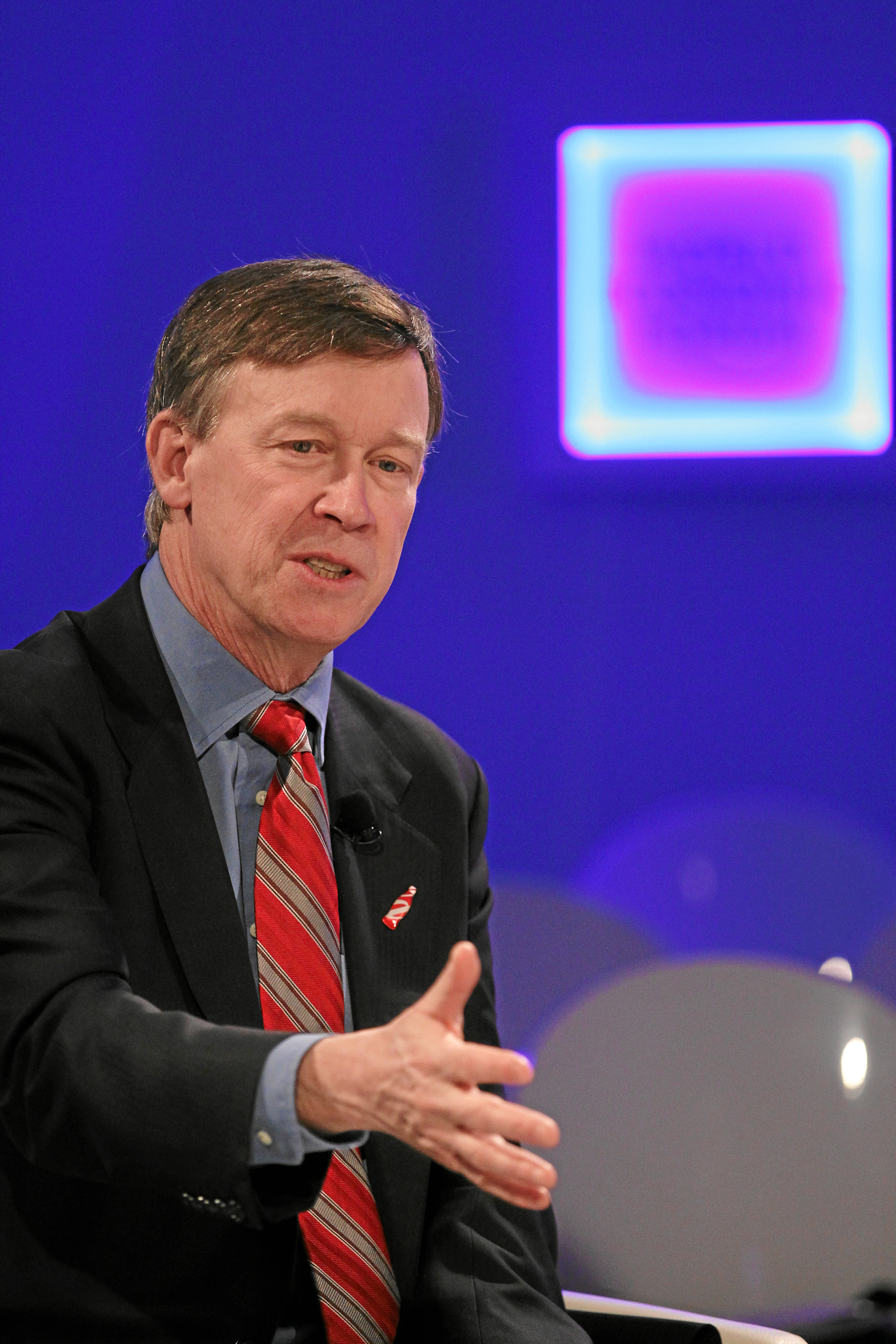
Hickenlooper during the World Economic Forum 2013

=== Capital punishment ===
In 2013, a campaign sought clemency for Nathan Dunlap, a black man facing execution for the 1993 murder of four people, with three former jurors saying they would not have voted for the death penalty had they known of his undiagnosed mental illness, while the mother of a victim, a former co-worker of Dunlap, and the Arapahoe County District Attorney urged Hickenlooper to let the execution take place. Hickenlooper granted Dunlap a reprieve, reversible by a future governor, citing inequity in the legal system and the evidence against capital punishment's effectiveness as a deterrent, saying, "It is a legitimate question whether we as a state should be taking lives".

In Hickenlooper's 2016 memoir, he came out against the death penalty, saying his views had changed after he became more familiar with the research showing bias against minorities and people with mental illnesses.

=== Disaster recovery ===
In May 2014, while serving as Governor of Colorado, Hickenlooper signed five bills related to disaster relief in the wake of flooding and wildfires. The bills funded grants to remove flood debris from watersheds and to repair flood-damaged schools and damaged wastewater and drinking water systems. They also exempted people who lost homes from having to pay property taxes and out-of-state disaster workers from having to pay Colorado state income tax.

=== Drug policy ===
In 2005, Denver voted to legalize possession of small amounts of cannabis, becoming the first major U.S. city to do so. Hickenlooper opposed the initiative as mayor, calling marijuana a gateway drug and saying that the initiative would not prevent enforcement of state law prohibiting cannabis. As governor in 2012, he opposed Amendment 64, which made Colorado the first state along with Washington to allow the sale and recreational use of cannabis. Hickenlooper said the initiative "sends the wrong message to kids that drugs are OK" and that "federal authorities have been clear they will not turn a blind eye toward states attempting to trump those laws". Despite his opposition, he worked with the state legislature to implement the initiative after it passed, and a federal crackdown on sale of the drug never materialized.

As Colorado's new laws were implemented and the results became clearer, Hickenlooper's views evolved. In 2016, he said that Colorado's approach to cannabis legalization was "beginning to look like it might work". In 2019, he said that "the things that I feared six years ago have not come to pass" and that he would be happy to decriminalize cannabis at the federal level if he became president. He also said that the federal government should not stop states from decriminalizing illicit drugs beyond marijuana, as well as allowing for safe, supervised injection sites. In 2022 he introduced the PREPARE Act, to direct the attorney general to develop a regulatory framework for cannabis similar to alcohol, in preparation for federal legalization of the drug.

=== Economic policy ===
In March 2014, Hickenlooper signed House Bill 1241, which funded the Rural Economic Development Initiative (REDI).

In 2016, Hickenlooper launched a program called Skillful, with the help of LinkedIn and the Markle Foundation. The program uses online tools and on-the-ground advisors to help businesses create job descriptions to tap into a wider job pool and help job seekers fill high-need jobs and connect them with job training. Twenty other states are now following. In 2017, Skillful added the Governors Coaching Corps. program, a career coaching initiative operated out of workforce center, community colleges, and nonprofits, with the help of a $25.8 million grant from Microsoft.

Hickenlooper calls himself "a fiscal conservative." He has said, "I don't think the government needs to be bigger. I think the government's got to work, and people have got to believe in government, and I think that's part of the problem," and "I think what a lot of Americans want is better government, not bigger government."

=== Energy and environment ===
Hickenlooper's administration created the first methane-capture regulations for oil and gas companies in the entire country. The rules prevented 95% of volatile organic compounds and methane from leaking from hydraulic fracturing wells. The rules were later used as blueprints for California, Canada, and the federal government's own new rules.

After Trump announced that the United States would leave the Paris Climate Accord, Hickenlooper joined more than a dozen other states in retaining the accord's greenhouse gas emission reduction goals.

NPR has called Hickenlooper a "strong supporter of Colorado's oil and gas industry". Unlike most Democrats, he supports hydraulic fracking, a controversial oil and natural gas extraction process. Before politics, Hickenlooper was a geologist. He believes fracking is a beneficial practice with minimal environmental harm, even testifying in a 2013 hearing before the Senate Committee on Energy and Natural Resources that he had drunk a glass of fracking fluid produced by Halliburton.

In September 2023, Hickenlooper introduced the BIG WIRES Act in the United States Senate as S. 2827 alongside Representative Scott Peters, who introduced it in the House of Representatives. The bill's provisions direct the Federal Energy Regulatory Commission (FERC) to "establish minimum interregional transfer capabilities", better coordinating construction of electrical transmission lines. The bill is part of broader push to accelerate permitting for clean energy.

In April 2025, Hickenlooper introduced the Fix Our Forests Act alongside Senators Alex Padilla, John Curtis, and Tim Sheehy. The bill aims to improve forest management for wildfire risk reduction.

=== Gun policy ===
Exactly eight months after the 2012 mass shooting in Aurora, Colorado, Hickenlooper signed bills into law requiring universal background checks on all gun transfers in Colorado except gifts between immediate family members, and banning magazines with more than 15 rounds. Even though most Coloradans supported the measures, according to polling by the Denver Post, the bills' opponents gathered enough signatures to trigger special elections leading to the ousting of Democratic state senators John Morse and Angela Giron and the resignation of Evie Hudak.

Hickenlooper was a member of Mayors Against Illegal Guns until 2011. In 2018, he supported a Red Flag or Extreme Risk Protection Order Bill in the legislature that would have allowed judges to temporally restrict firearm access to those deemed a significant risk to themselves or others. The GOP-controlled State Senate never let the bill out of committee that legislative session.

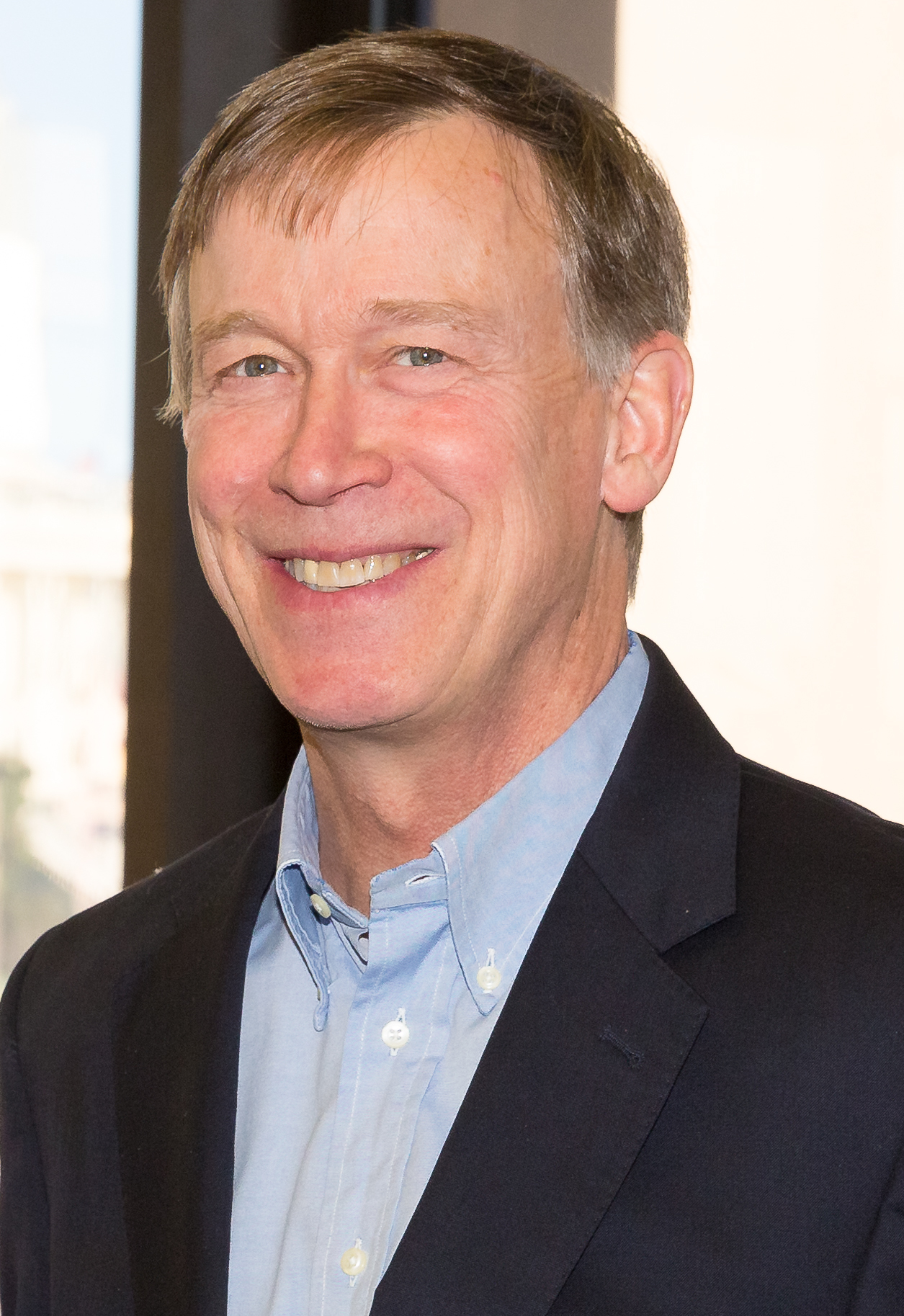
Hickenlooper in 2015

=== Healthcare and abortion ===
Hickenlooper expanded Medicaid and established Colorado's health insurance marketplace, Connect for Health Colorado, through the provisions of the Affordable Care Act. The state's uninsured rate dropped from 14.3% in 2013 to 6.5% in 2017. Approximately 350,000 Coloradans, about a quarter of whom are undocumented immigrants and thus ineligible for public insurance, remained without insurance coverage. The price of health insurance coverage continued to rise in Colorado, which has some of the highest premiums in the nation.

Hickenlooper is pro-choice on abortion rights. After Roe v. Wade was overturned in June 2022, he said the decision "threatens not just a woman’s physical health & control over her own future, but it also threatens to put women & their doctors in jail", and that "Republicans should join Democrats today and vote to keep politics out of reproductive health care decisions."

=== Immigration ===
As governor, Hickenlooper signed legislation granting in-state tuition to Deferred Action for Childhood Arrivals (DACA) and joined a lawsuit to stop the Trump administration from ending DACA. During his 2019 campaign for President, Hickenlooper described the Trump administration family separation policy as ″kidnapping″ and said it would be ″crazy″ to deport 11 million undocumented immigrants.

Hickenlooper voted against providing economic support to undocumented immigrants during the COVID-19 pandemic on February 4, 2021.

In 2025, Hickenlooper expressed support for ICE reforms and doubt that Republicans would agree.

=== Sex work ===
In March 2019, Hickenlooper said he supported legalizing sex work and regulating "where there are norms and protections".

=== Tech issues and cryptocurrency ===
During his 2020 presidential campaign, Hickenlooper voiced concern about potential monopolistic activity in the tech sector, and identified Amazon and Google as potentially hindering competition. His platform called for revamping the Clayton Antitrust Act of 1914 to clamp down on anti-competitive behavior.

As governor, Hickenlooper set up a Council for the Advancement of Blockchain Technology to coordinate Colorado's approach to blockchain policy.

== Personal life ==
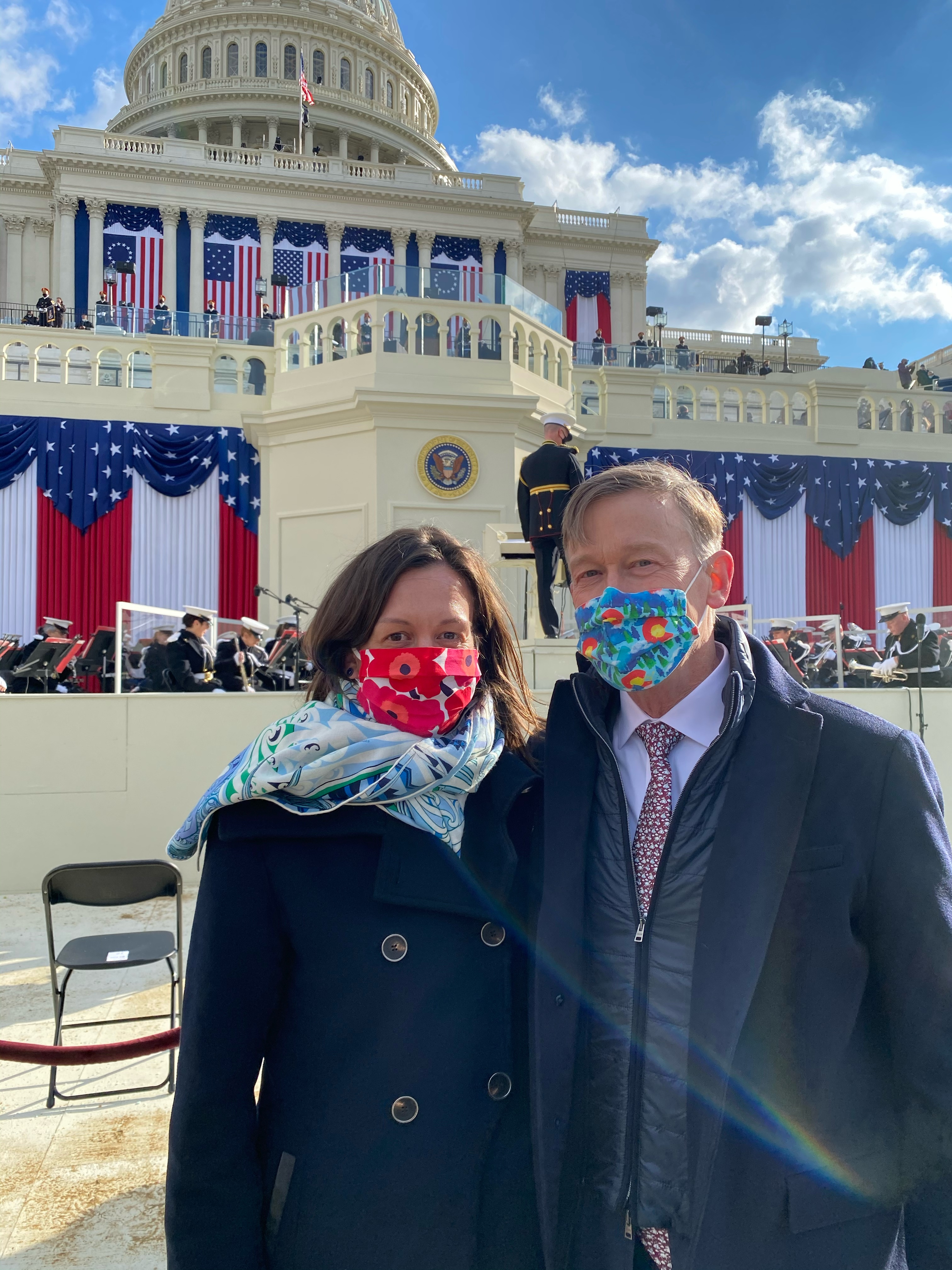
Hickenlooper with his wife Robin at the inauguration of Joe Biden

=== Marriages ===
Hickenlooper's first wife, Helen Thorpe, is a writer whose work has been published in The New Yorker, The New York Times Magazine, George, and Texas Monthly. Before they separated, they lived in Denver's Park Hill neighborhood with their son, Teddy. Upon taking office as governor, Hickenlooper and his family decided to maintain their private residence instead of moving to the Colorado Governor's Mansion. On July 31, 2012, Hickenlooper announced that he and Thorpe were divorcing after 10 years of marriage. After the divorce, Hickenlooper moved into the Governor's Mansion.

Hickenlooper married his second wife, Robin Pringle, on January 16, 2016. Pringle and Hickenlooper welcomed a baby boy via surrogate in December 2022.

=== Family background ===
Hickenlooper is of partial Dutch descent. His mother's family were practicing Quakers. He spent a summer in his teens volunteering with the American Friends Service Committee in Robbinston, Maine, helping establish a volunteer-run free school. In 2010, Hickenlooper told The Philadelphia Inquirer that he and Thorpe attended Quaker meetings and tried to live by Quaker values. In a 2018 speech to the Economic Club of Chicago, Hickenlooper said "I'm not a Quaker", but spoke about the role of Quaker teaching in his approach to government.

A cousin, George Hickenlooper (1963–2010) was an Emmy-winning documentary filmmaker. He is the great-grandson of Civil War Brivet Brigadier General Andrew Hickenlooper and the grandson of federal judge Smith Hickenlooper. Other relatives include pianist Olga Samaroff (née Lucy Mary Olga Agnes Hickenlooper), the first wife of conductor Leopold Stokowski, and great-uncle Bourke Hickenlooper, who served as governor of Iowa and a U.S. senator from Iowa.

Writer Kurt Vonnegut was a friend of Hickenlooper's father. Meeting later in life, Vonnegut offered advice that came to guide Hickenlooper's life: "Be very careful who you pretend to be, because that's who you're going to be." In his 2016 memoir, Hickenlooper mentioned that he watched the 1972 pornographic movie Deep Throat with his mother alongside one of his friends. He later recounted the event during his 2020 presidential campaign.

Hickenlooper is an avid squash player and continues to compete as a ranked player in national tournaments. As of 2019, Hickenlooper's net worth was more than $8 million.

=== Health ===
Hickenlooper lives with prosopagnosia, commonly known as "face blindness".

=== In popular culture ===
- As a result of his father's friendship with Kurt Vonnegut, Hickenlooper appears in Vonnegut's novel Timequake.
- For a 2004 roast of the then-mayor of Denver, Vonnegut declared in a joke video that he was Hickenlooper's real father.
- In November 2012, Esquire interviewed Hickenlooper as one of the "Americans of the Year 2012".
- Hickenlooper made a cameo appearance in his cousin George Hickenlooper's 2010 film Casino Jack.
- Hickenlooper appears in the 2021 documentary film JazzTown as well as the 2022 documentary short Who Killed Jazz.

== Electoral history ==
Political offices
Preceded by Wellington Webb	Mayor of Denver; 2003–2011	Succeeded by Bill Vidal
Preceded by Bill Ritter	Governor of Colorado; 2011–2019	Succeeded by Jared Polis
Preceded by Mary Fallin	Chair of the National Governors Association; 2014–2015	Succeeded by Gary Herbert
Party political offices
Preceded by Bill Ritter	Democratic nominee for Governor of Colorado; 2010, 2014	Succeeded by Jared Polis
Preceded by Mark Udall	Democratic nominee for U.S. Senator from Colorado (Class 2); 2020, 2026	Most recent
U.S. Senate
Preceded by Cory Gardner	U.S. Senator (Class 2) from Colorado; 2021–present Served alongside: Michael Bennet	Incumbent
U.S. order of precedence (ceremonial)
Preceded by Roger Marshall	Order of precedence of the United States as United States Senator	Succeeded by Cynthia Lummis
Preceded by Roger Marshall	United States senators by seniority 73rd	Succeeded by Bill Hagerty
