= Charlie Hunter =

American guitarist and composer (b. 1967)

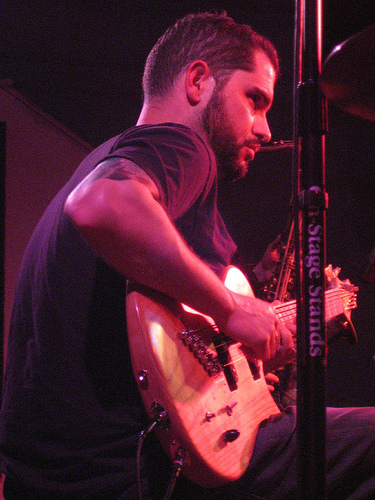
- Hunter at SPACE, Portland, Maine, February 25, 2006

Background information
- Born: May 23, 1967 (age 59); Rhode Island, U.S.
- Genres: Jazz; jazz fusion; acid jazz; jazz rock; funk; blues
- Occupations: Musician; producer
- Instrument: Guitar
- Years active: 1990–present
- Labels: Blue Note; Ropeadope; Concord Records; SideHustle Records
- Member of: Garage A Trois; Groundtruther; SuperBlue; Buffalo
- Formerly of: T. J. Kirk
- Website: www.charliehunter.com

Charlie Hunter (born May 23, 1967) is an American guitarist, composer, producer and bandleader. First coming to prominence in the early 1990s, Hunter plays custom-made seven - and eight-string guitars on which he simultaneously plays bass lines, chords, and melodies. Critic Sean Westergaard described Hunter's technique as "mind-boggling...he's an agile improviser with an ear for great tone, and always has excellent players alongside him in order to make great music, not to show off." Hunter's technique is rooted in the styles of jazz guitarists Joe Pass and Tuck Andress, two of his biggest influences, who blended bass notes with melody in a way that created the illusion of two guitars.

== Biography ==
Charlie Hunter performs at the Bennett Alliance Music Fest in Rochester, New York (July 21, 2007)

Charlie Hunter's affinity for guitars was cultivated from a young age, largely due to his mother's profession as a guitar repairer. He and his mother and sister lived for several years on a commune in Mendocino County, California, then settled in Berkeley. Hunter attended Berkeley High School and took lessons from rock guitarist Joe Satriani. At eighteen he moved to Paris. He has stated that busking in Paris gave him on the job training. Returning to San Francisco, he played seven-string guitar in Michael Franti's political rap group, The Disposable Heroes of Hiphoprisy. In 1992, they were one of the opening acts for U2's Zoo TV Tour.

For his self-titled 1993 debut album, Charlie Hunter Trio (PrawnSong 1993), Hunter played a seven-string guitar for the duality effect, locking down the bottom with drummer Jay Lane and mixing melodically with saxophonist Dave Ellis (saxophonist). On trio’s 1995 sophomore release, Bing, Bing, Bing! (Blue Note, 1995), he unveiled his custom-made Novax eight-string guitar. Designed by Ralph Novak, the instrument featured fanned frets and separate pickups for its guitar and bass portions. Picking bass notes with his right thumb while fretting them with his left index finger (while at the same time fingerpicking guitar chords and single notes with his right hand’s remaining four digits as he frets with his left hand’s other three fingers), Hunter achieved the real sound of two-for-one.

Hunter played with the side group T.J. Kirk in the mid-’90s, a band that derived their name from the cover material they exclusively played: Thelonious Monk, James Brown, and Rahsaan Roland Kirk. T.J. Kirk released a self-titled 1995 debut and their 1996 follow-up, If Four Was One received a GRAMMY nomination. Hunter’s next project was an instrumental remake of Bob Marley’s Natty Dread album in its entirety. Also featuring saxophonists Kenny Brooks and Calder Spanier, the 1997 release beat the odds by becoming arguably Hunter’s best album. Teaming with vibraphonist Stefon Harris and percussionist John Santos, Charlie Hunter & Pound for Pound released Return of the Candyman (Blue Note 1998). A departure from Natty Dread, mainly due to the work of Harris, the disc featured a vibes-heavy cover of Steve Miller’s “Fly Like an Eagle.”

He performed on three songs on D'Angelo's album Voodoo (2000), including "The Root". He has stated that the session for the song was the most challenging session he has worked on.

In between tours he recorded a 1999 duo album with drummer/percussionist Leon Parker and a self-titled 2000 album that featured Parker and an otherwise ensemble cast. Hunter also contributed greatly to the 2000 comeback album by drummer Mike Clark (drummer), Actual Proof. Hunter concluded his run at Blue Note with 2001’s Songs from the Analog Playground, which saw him collaborating with vocalists for the first time, ranging from labelmates Norah Jones and Kurt Elling to Mos Def. 2003 found Hunter with a new label (Ropeadope) and two new bands (the Charlie Hunter Quintet) on Right Now Move, and the beginning of Groundtruther, a partnership with percussionist/composer Bobby Previte. They released Come in Red Dog, This Is Tango Leader before adopting the Groundtruther moniker. In 2003 he released Friends Seen and Unseen, with drummer Derrek Phillips and saxman John Ellis (saxophonist), both members of the Quintet. By now, Groundtruther had taken on a life of its own, with Hunter and Previte joined by a rotating third member. Latitude was first, in 2004 with saxophonist Greg Osby, followed by Longitude with DJ Logic in 2005.

In 2006, the Charlie Hunter Trio resurfaced with Copperopolis. After recruiting Erik Deutsch on keys and Simon Lott on drums, the trio released Mistico in the summer of 2007. In 2008, Hunter released the self-titled Charlie Hunter Trio and "Baboon Strength" and then continued into the new decade with "Gentlemen, I Neglected to Inform You You Will Not Be Getting Paid." Hunter's exploration into various genres led to the creation of a unique catalog of instrumental music From 2008 to 2018, he released a series of albums that further explored his 7-string guitar style. Highlights during this period were “Baboon Strength” (2008), “Gentlemen I Neglected to Tell You You Will Not Be Getting Paid” (2009), “ Let the Bells Ring On" (2015), "Everybody Has a Plan Until They Get Punched in the Mouth" (2016). In 2016, he embarked on a groundbreaking tour with a new quartet that included a trombone, an instrument seldom seen in his previous line-ups. After releasing Blue Note’s "Songs of the Analog Playground" which featured Norah Jones, Kurt Elling, Mos Def, Theryl DeClouet, he continued to work with vocalists such as D’Angelo, Frank Ocean, John Mayer, alongside emerging voices like Dara Tucker, Lucy Woodward, Silvana Estrada, Maritzaida and Victoria Elliott.

By the end of the decade, Hunter’s innovative and pioneering contributions to the jazz genre had significantly reshaped its landscape, earning him a place among the most influential jazz artists of the 21st century.

During the 2019 pandemic, Hunter turned his attention towards music production and long-distance collaborations. This led to the creation of Wheelhouse Beats, a metronome app featuring some notable drummers. Furthermore, Hunter founded SideHustle Records, his personal record label and artist development house. As a staunch advocate for artist rights, he gained control of his master recordings, which he subsequently remastered and reissued. SideHustle Records’ artist development house is committed to nurturing emerging talent. Occasionally teaming up with The Little Village Foundation, a non-profit organization known for promoting and preserving diverse cultural expressions, Hunter works to amplify new voices and talents, and build a more inclusive music community. His various collaborations are instrumental in escalating the careers of many budding artists, further establishing his reputation as a producer, collaborator and mentor.

After a long-distance collaboration, former Blue Note label mate and GRAMMY award-winning vocalist, Kurt Elling, alongside Hunter, Corey Fonville, and DJ Harrison (Butcher Brown), debuted their band, SuperBlue, in late 2020. Their music blends traditional jazz with modern funk and groove-driven improvisation. Following their debut, the band embarked on several international tours and released a string of critically praised LPs and EPs (including SuperBlue and The Iridescent Spree) which altogether earned the project three GRAMMY award nominations. Adding to his growing list of accolades, Hunter was a contributor to Nate Smith's GRAMMY-winning project LIVE ACTION. In recent years, Hunter has been touring extensively, with appearances at major international festivals, venues and performing arts centers.

From 2021 to 2025, he continued to work with artists including Victoria Victoria, Butcher Brown, Jubu Smith & Calvin Napper, Sam Fribush, Corey Fonville, and Maritzaida, among others. Hunter appeared on NPR's Tiny Desk alongside Kiefer, Carrtoons, and Nate Smith, further showcasing his ability to fuse genres and push musical boundaries. This period also saw the critically acclaimed release of Different Strokes for Different Folks with Ella Feingold.

2026 started with Space Bomb, a collaborative album with Butcher Brown's Corey Fonville, DJ Harrison, and Andy Randazzo, followed by Only a Drop with singer-songwriter Lo Steele, and a new album, AM Clock Radio, in his familiar trio format with Marcus Finnie and Nate Clark. He toured with SuperBlue, Nicholas Payton, as well as with The Charlie Hunter Trio and Ella Feingold, bringing his genre-blending style to audiences worldwide. He and Ella Feingold plan to release Raw & Reel, a project recorded live to 4-track cassette, in late 2026.

== Equipment ==
Hunter currently plays 6 and 7 string guitars made by Hybrid Guitars Co. Hybrid Guitars was founded in 2015 when he teamed up with luthiers Clay Conner and Wes Lambe to produce fanned-fret instruments to his specifications. www.hybrid-guitars.com Previously, Hunter played custom-made seven-string guitar/s made by Jeff Traugott, eight-string guitar/s made by luthier Ralph Novak of Novax Guitars. He played chords and lead guitar solos on the top five strings (tuned ADGBE), and simultaneously played bass lines on the bottom three strings (tuned EAD). With the addition of a Hughes & Kettner Tube Rotosphere (a Leslie rotary speaker simulator), his unique style produced a sound similar to that of a Hammond organ—an instrument he set out to imitate.

In 2006, Hunter removed the top guitar string and had the neck of his guitar reworked and now plays a modified 7-string on the formerly-8 string body. Hunter has mentioned that because of his small hands, he had to move out of position to make use of the 8th string and thus wasn't using it much. A change in Hunter's style away from the organ sound into a more blues and distortion based sound happened at the same time. After removing the 8th string, Hunter retuned all of the strings up a half step: F-Bb-Eb on the bass and Bb-Eb-Ab-C on the guitar. As of 2008, he had once again retuned up another whole step: G-C-F on the bass and C-F-Bb-D on the guitar.

== Discography ==
=== As leader/co-leader ===
- Charlie Hunter Trio (Prawn Song, 1993)
- Bing, Bing, Bing! (Blue Note, 1995)
- Ready ... Set ... Shango! (Blue Note, 1996)
- Natty Dread (Blue Note, 1997)
- Return of the Candyman with Pound for Pound (Blue Note, 1998)
- Duo with Leon Parker (Blue Note, 1999)
- Charlie Hunter (Blue Note, 2000)
- Solo Eight-String Guitar (Contra Punto, 2000)
- Songs from the Analog Playground (Blue Note, 2001)
- Right Now Move (Ropeadope, 2003; SideHustle remaster, 2022)
- Come in Red Dog, This is Tango Leader with Bobby Previte (Ropeadope, 2003)
- Friends Seen and Unseen (Ropeadope, 2004; SideHustle, 2022)
- Copperopolis (Ropeadope, 2006; SideHustle 2022)
- Mistico (Fantasy, 2007)
- Baboon Strength (reapandsow, 2008; SideHustle 2023)
- Gentlemen, I Neglected to Inform You You Will Not Be Getting Paid (Spire/reapandsow, 2009; SideHustle 2023)
- Public Domain (2010; SideHustle 2023)
- Not Getting Behind Is the New Getting Ahead with Scott Amendola (Charlie Hunter Music, 2012; SideHustle 2023)
- Pucker with Scott Amendola (Sazi, 2013)
- Cars/Williams/Porter/Ellington with Scott Amendola (not on label, 2014)
- Dionne Dionne with Dionne Farris (Free & Clear, 2014)
- Let the Bells Ring On (There, 2015; SideHustle 2023)
- We Two Kings: Charlie Hunter and Bobby Previte Play the Great Carols with Bobby Previte (Rank Hypocri$y, 2015; SideHustle 2023)
- Everybody Has a Plan Until They Get Punched in the Mouth (GroundUP, 2016)
- Charlie Hunter/Carter McLean Featuring Silvana Estrada with Carter McLean and Silvana Estrada (not on label, 2018)
- Music! Music! Music! with Lucy Woodward (not on label, 2019)
- Charlie Hunter/Carter McLean Volume One with Carter McLean (not on label, 2020)
- Avant Blues with Bobby Previte (SideHustle, 2020)
- Patton in Percussion (SideHustle, 2020)
- I'm a Stranger Here with Lucy Woodward (not on label, 2021)
- Sam Fribush Organ Trio Vol. 1 Riverboat (SideHustle, 2021)
- Sam Fribush Organ Trio Vol. 2 The Root (SideHustle, 2021)
- Kick, Snare, Baritone Guitar (SideHustle, 2021)
- Charlie Hunter Trio Live At The Memphis Music Mansion (SideHustle, 2021)
- Montrose with Corey Fonville (Butcher Brown) and Adrian Olsen (SideHustle, 2024)
- Different Strokes for Different Folks Charlie Hunter and Ella Feingold (SideHustle, 2025)
- The 1966 Fender Mustang Songbook Vol 1 Night/Vol 2 Day (SideHustle, 2025)
- Space Bomb Charlie Hunter, Corey Fonville, DJ Harrison and Andy Randazzo (SideHustle, 2026)
- AM Clock Radio Charlie Hunter Ft Marcus Finnie and Nate Clark (SideHustle, 2026)

With Groundtruther

- Latitude (Thirsty Ear, 2004)
- Longitude (Thirsty Ear, 2005)
- Altitude (Thirsty Ear, 2007)

With Victoria Victoria

- To The Wayside (SideHustle, 2022)
- First Snow (SideHustle, 2022)
- Victoria Victoria and Charlie Hunter - Live Sessions (SideHustle, 2023)
- Sweetest Ache (SideHustle, 2023, 2024)

With SuperBlue (with Kurt Elling)

- SuperBlue (GRAMMY® Nomination. Edition, 2021)
- SuperBlue: The London Sessions (Live) (EP) (Edition, 2022)
- SuperBlue: Guilty Pleasures (feat. Nate Smith) (Edition, 2023)
- SuperBlue: The Iridescent Spree (GRAMMY® Nomination. Edition, 2023)

=== Other projects ===
With Garage a Trois

- Mysteryfunk (Fog City, 1999)
- Emphasizer (Tone-Cool, 2003)
- Outre Mer (Telarc, 2005)
- Calm Down Cologne (Royal Potato Family, 2021)

With T. J. Kirk

- T. J. Kirk (Warner Bros., 1994)
- If Four Was One (GRAMMY® Nomination, Warner Bros., 1996)
- Talking Only Makes it Worse (Ropeadope, 2003) [Live performance recorded 1997]

With Bobby Previte

- The Coalition of the Willing (Ropeadope, 2006)

With others

- Hypocrisy Is the Greatest Luxury, The Disposable Heroes of Hiphoprisy (Island, 1992)
- Spare Ass Annie and Other Tales, William S. Burroughs (Island, 1993)
- All Kooked Out!, Stanton Moore (Fog City, 1998)
- Voodoo, D'Angelo (GRAMMY® Award 2001. Cheeba Sound, 2000)
- Earth Tones with Earl "Chinna" Smith and Ernest Ranglin (Green Street, 2005)
- Live at Tonic, Christian McBride (Ropeadope, 2006)
- Continuum, John Mayer(GRAMMY® Award 2007, 2006)
- Fade (Tim Collins featuring Charlie Hunter & Simon Lott (Ropeadope, 2008)
- Go Home (Ben Goldberg, Charlie Hunter, Scott Amendola & Ron Miles (BAG Productions, 2009)
- Channel Orange ("Sweet Life") Frank Ocean (2012)
- Family Dinner Volume 2, Snarky Puppy (2016)
- The Rob Dixon Trio Coast to Crossroads Feat.Charlie Hunter and Mike Clark (drummer) (2018)
- Don't Let it Stop (Petr Cancura featuring Charlie Hunter and Geoff Clapp) (Roots2Boot, 2020)
- Just Play The Blues - Wil Blades, Charlie Hunter, George Sluppick - (SideHustle, 2021)
- Americana, Vol. 2 (J. D. Allen featuring Charlie Hunter, Gregg August, and Rudy Royston) (Savant, 2022)
- Mod Cons (SideHustle, 2023)
- Good Life (Maia Kamil SideHustle, 2023)
- People Please (FlyBird Music, 2024)
- Wine O'Clock (Shemekia Copeland Blame It On Eve (GRAMMY® Nomination. Alligator Records, 2024)
- Feel The Past, See The Future (Felix Ames 2024)
- Juke Joint (Nate Smith feat. Jermaine Holmes, Charlie Hunter, DJ Harrison) (GRAMMY® Award Naïve Records 2025)
- R&B Organ Trio (Corey Fonville, Sam Fribush, Charlie Hunter) (Fonville, 2026)
- Only a Drop (Lo Steele, Charlie Hunter, Marcus Finnie) (Little Village/SideHustle, 2026)
- Space Bomb (Charlie Hunter, Corey Fonville, DJ Harrison and Andy Randazzo) (SideHustle, 2026)

=== As producer/co-producer ===
- Charlie Hunter Solo Eight String Guitar (Contra Punto 2000)
- Songs From The Analog Playground (Blue Note 2001)
- Right Now Move (Ropeadope 2003 Remastered and Reissued on SideHustle, 2022)
- Copperopolis (Ropeadope 2006/Reissued on SideHustle, 2022)
- Mistico (Fantasy / UMG 2007)
- Baboon Strength (reapandsow 2008. Remastered and Reissued on SideHustle, 2023)
- Public Domain (2010 Reissued on SideHustle, 2023)
- Gentlemen, I Neglected To Inform You You Will Not Be Getting Paid (2010 Reissued on SideHustle, 2023)
- Not Getting Behind Is The New Getting Ahead with Scott Amendola (2012 Reissued on SideHustle, 2023)
- Pucker with Scott Amendola (Sazi Records 2013)
- The Cars, Hank Williams, Cole Porter, Duke Ellington with Scott Amendola (2014)
- We Two Kings with Bobby Previte (2015 Rank Hypocri$y; Reissued by SideHustle, 2023)
- DionneDionne with Dionne Farris (Free & Clear 2015)
- Let the Bells Ring On (2015; Reissued on SideHustle, 2023)
- Everybody Has A Plan Until They Get Punched In The Mouth (2016; Reissued by SideHustle, 2023)
- Lo Sagrado with Silvana Estrada (2017)
- Charlie Hunter/Carter McLean Ft. Silvana Estrada (2018)
- The Seven Colors Dara Tucker (2019)
- Music! Music! Music! with Lucy Woodward (Mocloud Records 2019)
- Bloom Honey & Blue (2020)
- Patton in Percussion (SideHustle, 2020)
- Charlie Hunter Trio Live At The Memphis Music Mansion (SideHustle, 2021)
- I’m A Stranger Here with Lucy Woodward (2021)
- Kick Snare Baritone Guitar (SideHustle, 2021)
- Space Girl with Reliably Bad (2021)
- Sam Fribush Organ Trio, Vol. 1: Riverboat & Vol. 2: The Root (SideHustle, 2021)
- Drums Roots and Steel with DaShawn Hickman (Little Village Foundation 2022)
- Nuevo South Train Larry & Joe (SideHustle, 2022)
- Just Play The Blues with Wil Blades and George Sluppick (SideHustle, 2022)
- To The Wayside with Victoria Victoria (SideHustle, 2022)
- First Snow with Victoria Victoria (SideHustle, 2022)
- Victoria Victoria & Charlie Hunter - Live Sessions (SideHustle, 2023)
- Mod Cons (SideHustle, 2023)
- Everybody’s Buddy Nic Clark (Little Village Music/SideHustle 2023)
- Boleros Clasicos Volumen Uno y Volumen Dos Maritzaida (SideHustle 2023)
- When The Levee Breaks: The Music of Memphis Minnie Candice Ivory (Little Village Music/SideHustle 2023)
- Sweetest Ache with Victoria Victoria (SideHustle, 2023, 2024)
- Jubu with Jubu Smith and Calvin Napper (Little Village/SideHustle 2024)
- Montrose with Corey Fonville (Butcher Brown) and Adrian Olsen (SideHustle, 2024)
- Different Strokes for Different Folks Charlie Hunter and Ella Feingold (SideHustle, 2025)
- Only a Drop (Lo Steele, Charlie Hunter, Marcus Finnie) (Little Village/SideHustle, 2026)
- Space Bomb (Charlie Hunter, Corey Fonville, DJ Harrison and Andy Randazzo) (SideHustle, 2026)
- AM Clock Radio (Ft Marcus Finnie and Nate Clark) (SideHustle, 2026)

Producing SuperBlue (with Kurt Elling)

- SuperBlue (Edition, 2021)
- SuperBlue: The London Sessions (Live) (EP) (Edition, 2022)
- SuperBlue: Guilty Pleasures (feat. Nate Smith (musician)) (Edition, 2023)
- SuperBlue: The Iridescent Spree (Edition, 2023)

== Videography ==
- Right Now Live, (Ropeadope DVD, 2004; Reissued to YouTube (SideHustle 2023)
- Solo Inventions, (Shanachie DVD, 2005)
- In Repair: One Song, One Day, playing 8-string with John Mayer (Aware 2006) (iTunes download)
- Solos: the Jazz Sessions, (Original Spin Media DVD, 2011)

== Filmography ==
- Late Night with Conan O'Brien (1997)
- SOLOS: the jazz sessions (2004)
- Rochester, New York Jazz Festival (2009)
- JazzTown (2021)
- Who Killed Jazz (2022)

== Soundtracks and Music Scores ==
- Netflix's The Dads (Short Documentary) (2022)
- The Dads (Full Feature Documentary) (Global Debut SXSW 2026)
