= Soul Said Yes =

Studio album by Dara Tucker
- Released: 2011
- Genre: Jazz, R&B

Dara Tucker chronology
All Right Now (2009)	Soul Said Yes (2011)	Dara Tucker Live (2013)

Soul Said Yes is the second studio project by singer Dara Tucker. It was released in 2011. It contains 14 songs, including two songs written by Tucker: "Partly Cloudy" and "The Space". Soul Said Yes features four songs with 7-string guitarist, Charlie Hunter: "Save Their Souls/Soul Said Yes", "The Space", "Stronger than Pride" and "I Will Move On Up a Little Higher". The album also features Greg Bryant (bass), Derrek Phillips (drums), James DaSilva (guitar), Reagan Mitchell (alto saxophone), Cord Martin (tenor saxophone), Chris West (soprano saxophone), Paul Horton (Fender Rhodes, piano) and Mason Embry (Fender Rhodes, piano).

== Track listing ==
1. All That You Have Is Your Soul
2. Save Their Souls/Soul Said Yes
3. Tangerine
4. Easy to Love
5. Partly Cloudy
6. The Space
7. Body and Soul
8. Stronger than Pride
9. Poinciana
10. Pure Imagination
11. (Our) Love Is Here to Stay
12. I Will Move On Up a Little Higher
13. The Silence (Part 1)
14. Soul Says Yes
