= Everybody Has a Plan Until They Get Punched in the Mouth =

Studio album by Charlie Hunter
- Released: 2016
- Genre: Jazz; jazz rock; jazz fusion; blues
- Length: 52:14
- Label: GroundUP
- Producer: Charlie Hunter

Charlie Hunter chronology
We Two Kings (2015)	Everybody Has a Plan Until They Get Punched in the Mouth (2016)	Charlie Hunter/Carter McLean Featuring Silvana Estrada (2018)

Professional ratings
Review scores
Source	Rating
AllMusic	4/5 stars

Everybody Has a Plan Until They Get Punched in the Mouth is a 2016 album by jazz guitarist Charlie Hunter. It is his first record for GroundUP Music.

The album, whose songs are all written by Hunter, features regular collaborators Bobby Previte on drums and Curtis Fowlkes on trombone, along with Kirk Knuffke on the cornet. Its title refers to a quote by boxer Mike Tyson. According to Hunter, the record is rooted in the blues to an even greater extent than previous efforts: "The concept was to play and not think of it as jazz, but an improvisation of the blues and R&B. This is not from a jazz harmonic place, but straight blues and R&B improvising."

== Track listing ==
All songs written by Charlie Hunter.

1. "Everybody Has a Plan Until They Get Punched in the Mouth" – 5:02
2. "(Looks Like) Somebody Got Ahead of Schedule on Their Medication" – 7:33
3. "Leave Him Lay" – 4:03
4. "We Don't Want Nobody Nobody Sent" – 5:31
5. "Big Bill's Blues" – 3:43
6. "Latin for Travelers" – 4:47
7. "No Money, No Honey" – 3:53
8. "Who Put You Behind the Wheel?" – 6:49
9. "(Wish I Was) Already Paid and on My Way Home" – 6:01
10. "The Guys. Get. Shirts." – 4:59

== Personnel ==
- Charlie Hunter – seven-string guitar
- Bobby Previte – drums
- Curtis Fowlkes – trombone
- Kirk Knuffke – cornet

Production

- Charlie Hunter – producer
- Nic Hard – recording engineer
- Dave McNair – mastering
