= Gentlemen, I Neglected to Inform You You Will Not Be Getting Paid =

Studio album by Charlie Hunter
- Released: 2009
- Studio: Brooklyn Recording
- Genre: Jazz, jazz rock, jazz fusion, blues
- Length: 37:38
- Label: Spire/reapandsow
- Producer: Charlie Hunter

Charlie Hunter chronology
| Baboon Strength (2008) | Gentlemen, I Neglected to Inform You You Will Not Be Getting Paid (2009) | Public Domain (2010) |

Professional ratings
Review scores
| Source | Rating |
|---|---|
| AllMusic | 3.5/5 stars |

Gentlemen, I Neglected to Inform You You Will Not Be Getting Paid is a 2009 album by jazz guitarist Charlie Hunter.

Recorded "In Glorious Mono" on analog tape with no overdubs, the album marks a shift in Hunter's sound from the genre-mixing of his previous three releases to a consistent blues/R&B-influenced approach. The title is allegedly a real quotation; according to Hunter,

Well, it's a quote from a real, older, curmudgeonly musician that people have worked for. And I cannot name names, but it really did happen. It really does happen; let me put it that way.

== Track listing ==
All songs written by Charlie Hunter.

1. "You Look Good in Orange" – 4:43
2. "Antoine" – 3:13
3. "High and Dry" – 4:20
4. "Tout Ce Qui Brille Ne Pas Or" – 5:08
5. "High Pockets and a Fanny Pack" – 4:02
6. "Drop a Dime" – 4:37
7. "Ode to My Honda Odyssey" – 4:01
8. "Every Day You Wake Up New York Says No" – 4:26
9. "Gentlemen, I Neglected to Inform You You Will Not Be Getting Paid" – 3:11

== Personnel ==
- Charlie Hunter – seven-string guitar
- Eric Kalb – drums
- Curtis Fowlkes – trombone
- Alan Ferber – trombone
- Eric Biondo – trumpet

Production

- Charlie Hunter – producer
- Dave McNair – producer
