= Not Getting Behind Is the New Getting Ahead =

Studio album by Charlie Hunter and Scott Amendola
- Released: 2012
- Studio: Brooklyn Recording
- Genre: Jazz, jazz rock, jazz fusion, blues
- Length: 44:00
- Label: Charlie Hunter Music
- Producer: Charlie Hunter and Scott Amendola

Charlie Hunter chronology
Public Domain (2010)	Not Getting Behind Is the New Getting Ahead (2012)	Pucker (2013)

Not Getting Behind Is the New Getting Ahead is a 2012 album by jazz guitarist Charlie Hunter and drummer Scott Amendola. "Our intention in making this record was to tell a bunch of stories around the central theme of the album’s title," said Hunter. "The new tunes are meant to evoke some of the things you might see in your travels through the USA these days. Scott and I wanted to think of each composition as a starting point for some kind of narrative."

All songs were recorded live in one room, and most are first takes. Said Amendola, "One of the best elements of this new album is that we didn't use any headphones. We could hear everything naturally and acoustically. No mixing and no fixing, straight to ¼-inch tape. It sounds incredible. My drums haven't sounded this good ever. Everything sounded just as you were naturally playing it."

== Track listing ==
All songs written by Charlie Hunter.

1. "Assessing the Assessors, an Assessor's Assessment" – 5:32
2. "Rust Belt" – 4:12
3. "There Used to Be a Nightclub There" – 5:17
4. "The Wizard Pounds the Pavement" – 5:16
5. "Not Getting Behind Is the New Getting Ahead" – 3:42
6. "Ghost Mall" – 3:17
7. "Blind Arthur" – 4:42
8. "Those Desks Aren't Going to Clean Themselves" – 3:56
9. "Dot Dot Dah" – 4:58
10. "Economy with Dignity" – 3:09

== Personnel ==
- Charlie Hunter – seven-string guitar
- Scott Amendola – drums

Production

- Charlie Hunter – producer
- Dave McNair – producer
