= Freddy Rodriguez (saxophonist) =

Jazz saxophonist (1941–2022)

- Born: Freddy Rodriguez; February 9, 1931; Denver, Colorado, U.S.
- Died: March 25, 2020 (aged 89) Denver, Colorado, U.S.
- Genres: Jazz
- Occupation: Musician
- Instruments: Alto and tenor saxophone
- Years active: 1942–2020
- Label: Pacific Jazz Records

Freddy Rodriguez (February 9, 1931 – March 25, 2020) was an American jazz alto and tenor saxophonist and composer.

== Biography ==
Rodriguez learned to play the clarinet at Baker Junior High School in his native Denver in 1942. He was influenced by Artie Shaw, Coleman Hawkins and Lester Young and switched to alto and tenor saxes at West High School. He attended concerts by the visiting jazz greats in the Rainbow Ballroom and began a career as a professional musician. In 1948 he became a regular soldier and played in a military band near Seattle. He also performed with numerous musicians who were on tour.

In 1958, he moved to New York City with his family, but was not able to quickly gain a foothold in the jazz scene there, and in 1960 moved again, to Los Angeles. In 1962 and 1963, he played alongside Charles Lloyd in Gerald Wilson's big band. He worked with Horace Tapscott and Harold Land and accompanied Nancy Wilson. Then he was part of Tommy Peltier's Jazz Corps, performing at Hermosa Beach's Lighthouse Café; with him he released records on the Pacific Jazz Records label, most recently with Rahsaan Roland Kirk. Tom Lord lists four recordings by Rodriguez between 1963 and 1965. In 1968, Tommy Peltier suffered a hernia that ended his jazz career and his Jazz Corps disbanded.

In 1973, Rodriguez returned to Denver with his family, where he worked other jobs, but also continued as a musician. For 40 years he performed in clubs there every Wednesday, and for 20 years in jazz club El Chapultepec, most recently three weeks before his death. Rodriguez wrote the chorale We Lift Our Hands.

In 2021, Rodriguez appeared in the documentary film JazzTown.

After being infected with the SARS-CoV-2 corona virus, he was admitted to hospital, where he died ten days later as a result of COVID-19.
