= Let the Bells Ring On =

Studio album by Charlie Hunter Trio
- Released: 2015
- Studio: Three Horses in a Wood
- Genre: Jazz, jazz rock, jazz fusion, blues
- Length: 43:55
- Label: There
- Producer: Charlie Hunter

Charlie Hunter chronology
Dionne Dionne (2014)	Let the Bells Ring On (2015)	We Two Kings (2015)

Professional ratings
Review scores
Source	Rating
AllMusic	4.5/5 stars

Let the Bells Ring On is a 2015 album by jazz guitarist Charlie Hunter.

The album, whose songs are all written by Hunter, was conceived partially as a vehicle for his collaborators, drummer Bobby Previte and trombonist Curtis Fowlkes. Said Hunter,

[Previte's] probably known as a composer more than anything else, but he’s always been one of my favorite drummers. He came up in the 1960s, and he has the beat. You have to have lived it to have that feel. Because of his composer’s mind, we can play the simplest groove and it becomes something really exciting and compositional. [As for Fowlkes,] conceptually I’ve been doing a duo thing with Scott that I love, but I wanted to have that third voice. I wanted somebody with a vibe who understands free improv and Al Green and Frank Sinatra and Sam Cooke. I wanted someone who can sing on their horn. I needed Curtis.

== Track listing ==
All songs written by Charlie Hunter.

1. "Anthem U.S.A." – 4:05
2. "These People?" – 4:21
3. "Pho-Kus-On-Ho-Ho-Kus" – 5:39
4. "Let the Bells Ring On" – 4:58
5. "Hillbilly Heroine Chic" – 4:52
6. "Welcome to Nutley" – 4:35
7. "Fellini Farm Team" – 4:41
8. "Ojai Housecoat of Arms" – 3:33
9. "Vernel" – 4:24
10. "Spence" – 2:51

== Personnel ==
- Charlie Hunter – seven-string guitar
- Bobby Previte – drums
- Curtis Fowlkes – trombone

Production

- Charlie Hunter – producer
- Fabian Rucker – recording engineer
- Dave McNair – mastering
