= DionneDionne =

Studio album by The Dionne Farris/Charlie Hunter Duo
- Released: September 2, 2014
- Recorded: May 6, 2014 – May 8, 2014
- Studio: The Bunker, Brooklyn, New York
- Genre: Jazz
- Length: 43:55
- Label: Free & Clear Records
- Producer: Dionne Farris and Charlie Hunter

Charlie Hunter chronology
Cars/Williams/Porter/Ellington (2014)	DionneDionne (2014)	Let the Bells Ring On (2015)

DionneDionne is a 2015 tribute album to Dionne Warwick by singer Dionne Farris and jazz guitarist Charlie Hunter.

== Critical reception ==
The editorial staff at AllMusic Guide scored this album four out of five stars, awarding it the Best of 2014. Reviewer Matt Collar characterized the release as "a creatively inspired collaboration and deeply heartfelt homage".

== Track listing ==
All songs written by Burt Bacharach and Hal David except where noted.

1. "(Fat) Alfie" – 3:29
2. "Walk the Way You Talk" – 3:09
3. "Always Something There to Remind Me" – 4:15
4. "Don't Make Me Over" – 4:52
5. "Wives and Lovers" – 4:24
6. "Loneliness Remembers (What Happiness Forgets)" – 2:03
7. "Deja Vu" (Anderson and Hayes) – 4:14
8. "Walk on By" – 3:45
9. "You're Gonna Need Me" (Holland) – 4:03

== Personnel ==
- Dionne Farris – vocals, production
- Charlie Hunter – seven-string guitar, production

Technical personnel

- Anthony Creamer – executive producer
- John Davis – recording and mixing
- Tahi Hunter – photography
- David McNain – mastering
