= Cars/Williams/Porter/Ellington =

Studio album by Charlie Hunter and Scott Amendola
- Released: 2014
- Studio: The Bunker
- Genre: Jazz, jazz rock, jazz fusion, blues, country jazz
- Length: 76:00
- Producer: Charlie Hunter and Scott Amendola

Charlie Hunter chronology
Pucker (2013)	Cars/Williams/Porter/Ellington (2014)	Dionne Dionne (2014)

Cars/Williams/Porter/Ellington is a 2014 compilation album by jazz guitarist Charlie Hunter and drummer Scott Amendola.

The album collects four EPs recorded by Hunter and Amendola in early 2014, respectively focused on the songs of The Cars, Hank Williams, Cole Porter, and Duke Ellington. Said Hunter,

The idea is to do these four and see how people respond. We started thinking why do we keep making 10-song CDs. I don’t necessarily want to do 10 Hank Williams songs, but five can work well. As long as the song is good we can put it through the mill, like what we did with T.J. Kirk and the Bob Marley album I made.

== Track listing ==
Part I: The Cars

1. "Bye Bye Love" – 5:44
2. "Candy-O" – 3:43
3. "Double Life" – 3:29
4. "Good Times Roll" – 4:40
5. "Let's Go" – 3:38

Part II: Hank Williams

1. "Move It On Over" – 4:43
2. "I'm So Lonesome I Could Cry" – 4:07
3. "Cold, Cold Heart" – 3:39
4. "Ramblin' Man" – 3:17
5. "Your Cheatin' Heart" – 3:37

Part III: Duke Ellington

1. "Blue Pepper" – 2:38
2. "Rockin' in Rhythm" – 4:09
3. "Day Dream" –3:24
4. "The Mooche" – 3:51
5. "Mood Indigo" – 3:19

Part IV: Cole Porter

1. "Ace in the Hole" – 3:17
2. "Too Darn Hot" – 4:18
3. "Ev'ry Time We Say Goodbye" – 3:28
4. "Miss Otis Regrets" – 2:16
5. "Anything Goes" – 4:19

== Personnel ==
- Charlie Hunter – seven-string guitar
- Scott Amendola – drums

Production

- Charlie Hunter – producer
- Scott Amendola – producer
