= Pucker (album) =

2013 album by Scott Amendola and Charlie Hunter

Studio album by Scott Amendola and Charlie Hunter
- Released: 2013
- Studio: Tiny Telephone, San Francisco
- Genre: Jazz, jazz rock, jazz fusion, blues
- Length: 41:00
- Label: Sazi Records
- Producer: Charlie Hunter and Scott Amendola

Charlie Hunter chronology
Not Getting Behind Is the New Getting Ahead (2012)	Pucker (2013)	Cars/Williams/Porter/Ellington (2014)

Pucker is a 2013 album by jazz drummer Scott Amendola and guitarist Charlie Hunter. It's the second of the pair's albums as co-leaders, following the Hunter-fronted Not Getting Behind Is the New Getting Ahead; this time, Amendola receives top billing and the majority of the song credits.

== Track listing ==
All songs written by Scott Amendola except where noted.

1. "Leave On" – 4:18
2. "Pucker" – 2:38
3. "Deep Eyes" – 5:03
4. "Tiny Queen" – 5:28
5. "Scott's Tune" (Tony Gottuso) – 4:38
6. "Rubbed Out" – 4:48
7. "Sharp Tooth" – 3:38
8. "The Mighty" – 5:26
9. "Buffalo Bird Women" – 4:47

== Personnel ==
- Charlie Hunter – seven-string guitar, producer
- Scott Amendola – drums, producer
