= Baboon Strength =

Studio album by Charlie Hunter
- Released: 2008
- Studio: Trout Studio
- Genre: Jazz, jazz rock, jazz fusion, acid jazz
- Length: 44:35
- Label: reapandsow
- Producer: Charlie Hunter

Charlie Hunter chronology
Mistico (2007)	Baboon Strength (2008)	Gentlemen, I Neglected to Inform You You Will Not Be Getting Paid (2009)

Alternate artwork for vinyl and some CD releases

Baboon Strength is a 2008 album by jazz guitarist Charlie Hunter.

"I brought some decent songs and tried not to overplay. It's a never-ending process," said Hunter of the record. It marks the culmination of Hunter's more eclectic fusion recordings; future records would follow a more straightforward blues/R&B pattern. The album was recorded at Trout Studios in Brooklyn with an old school set-up where everything happened in the same room, recorded to 16 track two-inch tape before putting it in the digital realm.

== Track listing ==
All songs written and performed by Charlie Hunter.

No.	Title	Length
1.	"Athens"	2:43
2.	"Astronaut Love Triangle"	4:53
3.	"Difford-Tilbrook"	4:05
4.	"Welcome to Frankfurt"	3:13
5.	"A Song for Karen Carpenter"	5:53
6.	"Baboon Strength"	5:32
7.	"Fine Corinthian Leather"	6:05
8.	"Porter-Hayes"	5:02
9.	"AbadabA"	7:10
Total length:		44:35

== Personnel ==
- Charlie Hunter – seven-string guitar
- Tony Mason – drums
- Erik Deutsch – keyboards

Production

- Charlie Hunter – producer
- Dave McNair – mastering
