= We Two Kings: Charlie Hunter and Bobby Previte Play the Great Carols =

Studio album by Charlie Hunter and Bobby Previte
- Released: 2015
- Genre: Jazz, jazz rock, jazz fusion, holiday music
- Length: 40:00
- Label: Rank Hypocrisy
- Producer: Charlie Hunter and Bobby Previte

Charlie Hunter chronology
Let the Bells Ring On (2015)	We Two Kings: Charlie Hunter and Bobby Previte Play the Great Carols (2015)	Everybody Has a Plan Until They Get Punched in the Mouth (2016)

We Two Kings: Charlie Hunter and Bobby Previte Play the Great Carols is a 2015 Christmas album by jazz guitarist Charlie Hunter and drummer Bobby Previte.

== Track listing ==
1. "Joy to the World" – 3:03
2. "It Came Upon a Midnight Clear" – 2:46
3. "Deck the Halls" – 3:14
4. "God Rest Ye Merry Gentlemen" – 2:58
5. "Hark! the Herald Angels Sing" – 3:20
6. "We Three Kings" – 3:56
7. "The First Noel" – 4:09
8. "Good King Wenceslas" – 2:59
9. "Angels We Have Heard on High" – 3:40
10. "Jingle Bells" – 2:45
11. "O Come All Ye Faithful" – 3:08
12. "Silent Night" – 3:12

== Personnel ==
- Charlie Hunter – seven-string guitar, electric bass, electric piano, organ, percussion
- Bobby Previte – drums, electric piano, organ, synthesizer, percussion
- Curtis Fowlkes – trombone on tracks 5, 7, 11

Production

- Charlie Hunter – producer
- Bobby Previte – producer
