= Ben Makinen =

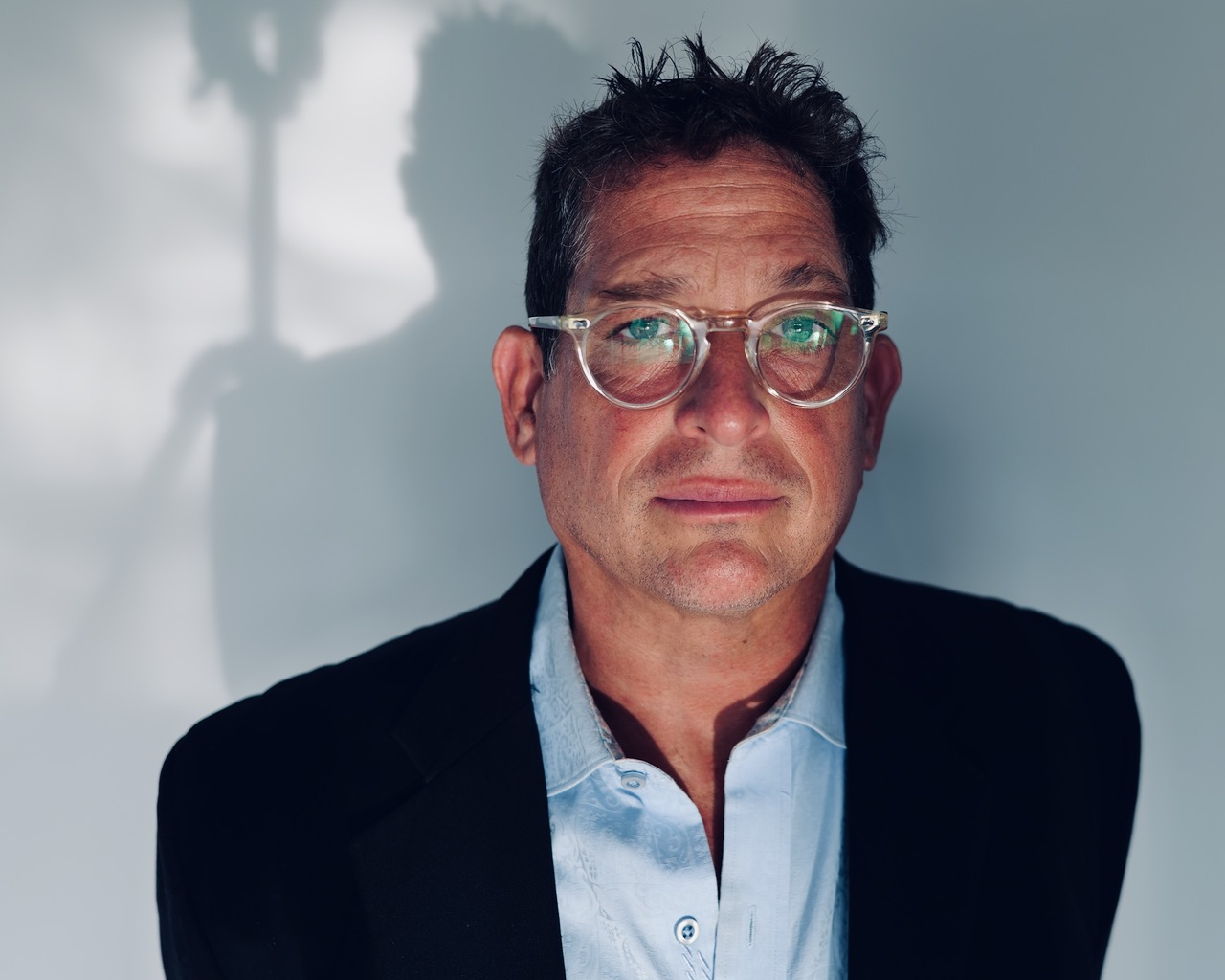
- Makinen in 2022
- Born: March 14, 1967 (age 59); Maine, United States
- Occupations: Filmmaker; music producer; composer; drummer
- Years active: 1980s–present
- Notable work: JazzTown (2021); Who Killed Jazz (2022)
- Website: https://benmakinen.com/

Ben Makinen is an American filmmaker, music producer, composer, and drummer best known for the award-winning films JazzTown (2021) and Who Killed Jazz (2022).

== Biography ==
Ben Makinen was born in Maine and grew up in California, Washington, Oklahoma, and Colorado. Living in Tulsa, Oklahoma in 1982, he was cast as an extra in Francis Ford Coppola’s movie The Outsiders. Makinen's family moved to Aurora, Colorado the following year where he attended high school.

Makinen attended the University of Miami in 1986 as a drum set major. Makinen attended the University of Colorado at Denver in 1987 and soon dropped out of school to begin playing drums regularly with pianist Billy Wallace at the Denver jazz club El Chapultepec. Throughout the late 1980s and early 90s Makinen performed and recorded with other up-and-coming jazz musicians including Javon Jackson, Brad Leali, Pat Bianchi, and Greg Gisbert.

== Career ==
Makinen began working professionally as a drummer in the early 1980s. He has worked as a music producer and composer since the 1990s. Makinen is the founder of the film production and distribution company Bmakin Films, the music publishing company Bmakin Music, and the International Modern Film Alliance (IMFA). He began making short films with the formation of Bmakin Films in 2001. In addition to his work in film, Makinen is also a voting member of the Recording Academy Producers and Engineers Wing."

Makinen founded the International Modern Film Alliance (IMFA) in 2020 during the COVID-19 outbreak to provide resources and instruction to amateur filmmakers. Makinen leads IMFA workshops for children and young adults in Bali, Indonesia.

== Recognition ==
Makinen's jazz music video “Alone At Sunset” won Best Sound Design in the 2019 Nederland International Film Festival and was a 2021 Official Selection of the Anotolia International Film Festival. His indie music video “Hypomania” was also an Official Selection at the 2021 Anatolia International Film Festival and was a Finalist in the 2021 4th Dimension International Film Festival.

Makinen’s short film Anthropocene won two Silver Awards in the 2022 Megaflix Film Festival for Best Experimental Film and Best Nature Film.

His first feature-length documentary film, JazzTown, has won fifteen awards as of February 2022.
