= JazzTown =

2021 jazz documentary film

- Directed by: Ben Makinen
- Written by: Ben Makinen
- Produced by: Ben Makinen
- Edited by: Ben Makinen
- Music by: Ben Makinen
- Production company: Bmakin Film ltd.
- Release date: 2021
- Running time: 91 minutes
- Country: United States
- Language: English

JazzTown is a 2021 American documentary film by director and musician Ben Makinen. Through spontaneous conversations and performances, the film highlights the jazz scene of Denver, Colorado, and considers jazz as a dynamic art form.

== Synopsis ==
JazzTown features interviews with over 50 Colorado jazz musicians, including Freddy Rodriguez Sr., Charles Burrell, Dianne Reeves, and Ron Miles. U.S. Senator John Hickenlooper, a fan of the genre, also appears in the film. Conversations span a wide variety of topics, including the history of jazz in Denver and the role of mentorship in jazz communities. Makinen’s informal approach to interviewing was inspired by Art Taylor’s book Notes and Tones: Musician-to-Musician Interviews.

== Production ==
Ben Makinen, who attended high school in Colorado, produced JazzTown over the course of twelve years. As the sole director, writer, and editor, Makinen aimed to document the stories of older players while exploring the new generation of jazz musicians. According to a 2022 article in Westword, “Makinen says JazzTown has the distinction of being the only feature-length jazz documentary made entirely by one person.”

In May 2021, Makinen sold his home in Colorado to help finance the film’s completion while living in Bali, Indonesia. His video files were damaged during heavy rains, but he was able to recover them.

Previously unused footage from the film was utilized in Makinen's documentary short film Who Killed Jazz.

== Reception ==
=== Awards ===
- Best Director Documentary Feature, 2021 San Diego Movie Awards
- Best Picture, March 2021 Rome Movie Awards
- Documentary Feature Award of Recognition, May 2021 IndieFEST Film Awards
- Critics’ Choice Award, January 2021-February 2021 World Film Carnival
