= Helen Sung =

American jazz pianist

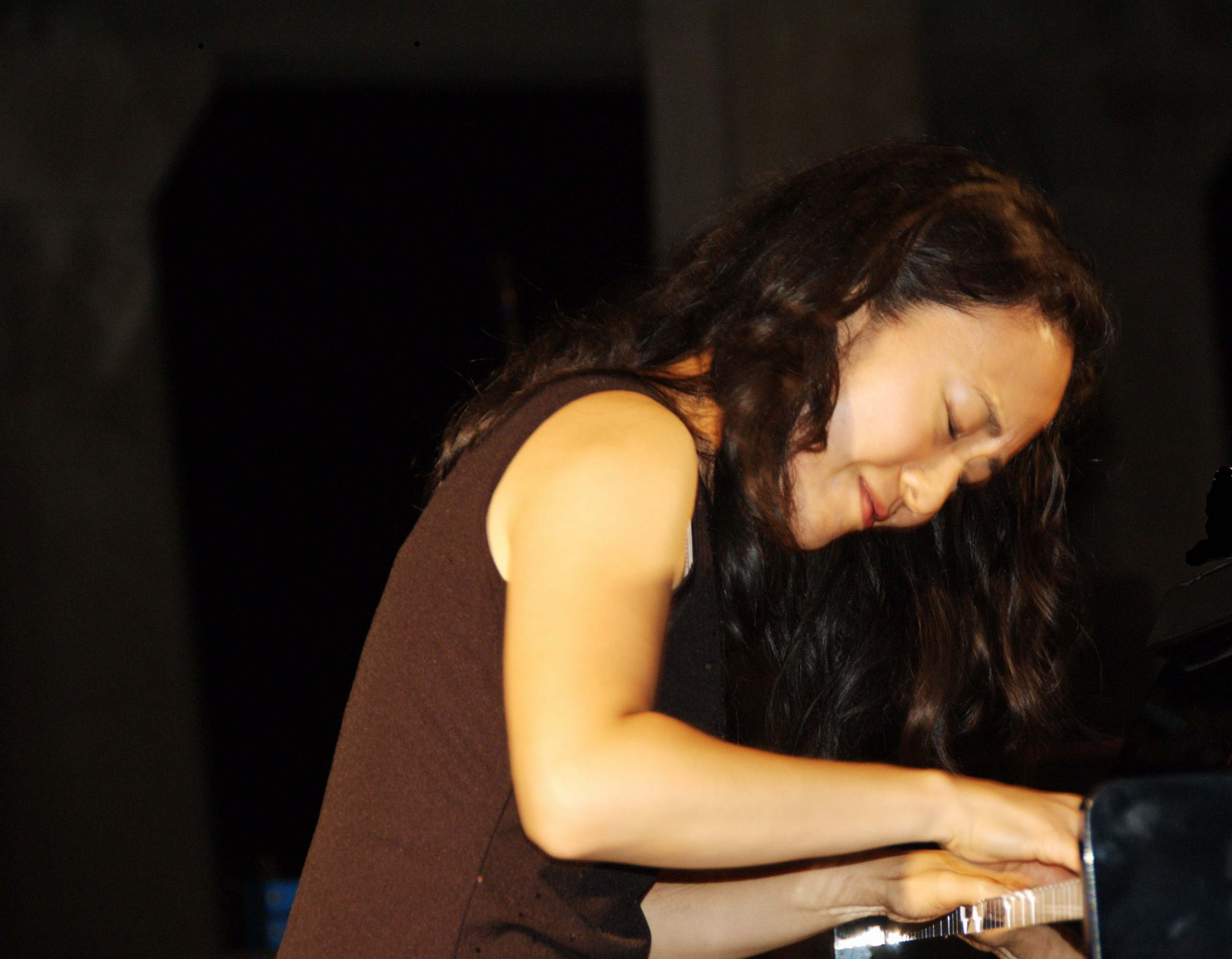
- Sung performing in 2007

Background information
- Born: Houston, Texas, U.S.
- Genres: Jazz, classical
- Occupation: Musician
- Instrument: Piano
- Years active: 1997–present
- Label: Concord
- Website: helensung.com

Helen Sung is an American jazz pianist.

== Career ==
Sung is a native of Houston, Texas, and is of Chinese heritage. She attended Houston's High School for the Performing and Visual Arts, and went on to receive undergraduate and master's degrees in classical piano performance at the University of Texas at Austin. She first heard jazz music during that time and eventually switched her focus. She went on to graduate from the Thelonious Monk Institute of Jazz Performance. Highlights of the two-year program include performing at the Kennedy Center and touring India and Thailand with Herbie Hancock and Wayne Shorter.

Sung won the Mary Lou Williams Jazz Piano Competition in 2007 and was a semifinalist in the Monk Institute Piano Competition in 1999. She appeared on the radio show Piano Jazz with Marian McPartland on NPR.

She has performed at many festivals, including the Monterey Jazz Festival, Detroit International Jazz Festival, Aspen Institute Ideas Festival, Seattle's Earshot Festival, and the Mary Lou Williams Festival sponsored by the Kennedy Center.

She has been featured at the Wigan International Jazz Festival, China's Jz Festival, India's "Jus' Jazz" Festival, and the Kalisz International Jazz Piano Festival in Poland. She and her group NuGenerations toured southern Africa as jazz ambassadors.

She has worked with Clark Terry, Slide Hampton, Ron Carter, Jon Faddis, Wayne Shorter, T. S. Monk, MacArthur Fellow Regina Carter, and Terri Lyne Carrington.

Sung produced a jazz residency program for under-served students (through a Chamber Music America/Doris Duke Foundation grant), conducts workshops/master-classes, and joined the Berklee College of Music as an Associate Piano Professor in the Fall of 2011. She has completed composition commissions for the West Chester University Poetry Conference, arts organization JazzReach, the artisanal North Coast Brewing Company, and was selected as a 2010 NYC Spaces/Con Edison Composer-in-Residence at Flushing Town Hall.

== Discography ==
=== As leader ===
- Push (Fresh Sound, 2003)
- Helenistique (Fresh Sound, 2006)
- Sungbird (Sunnyside, 2007)
- Going Express (Sunnyside, 2011)
- (re) Conception (SteepleChase, 2011)
- Anthem for a New Day (Concord Jazz, 2014)
- Sung With Words (Stricker Street, 2018)
- Quartet+ (Sunnyside, 2021)
- Everybody's Waltz - Helen Sung with Marquis Hill (J.M.I. Recordings, 2021)
- Oracles (Sunnyside, 2026)

=== As guest ===
- Ester Andujar, Celebrating Cole Porter (Omix, 2005)
- Louie Bellson, Clark Terry, Louie & Clark Expedition 2 (Percussion Power, 2008)
- Terri Lyne Carrington, The Mosaic Project (Concord, 2015)
- Joe Chambers, Horace to Max (Savant, 2010)
- Frank Lacy & Mingus Big Band, Mingus Sings (Sunnyside, 2015)
- Wynton Marsalis, Handful of Keys (Blue Engine, 2017)
- Lonnie Plaxico, Melange (Blue Note, 2001)
- Marcus Printup, Lost (SteepleChase, 2014)
- Scott Robinson, Tenormore (Arbors, 2019)
- Gregory Tardy, Hope (SteepleChase, 2014)
- Clark Terry, Live at Marihans (Chiaroscuro, 2005)
