= Who Killed Jazz =

- Directed by: Ben Makinen
- Written by: Ben Makinen
- Produced by: Ben Makinen
- Edited by: Ben Makinen
- Music by: Ben Makinen
- Production company: Bmakin Film ltd.
- Release date: 2021
- Running time: 22 minutes
- Country: United States
- Language: English

Who Killed Jazz is a 2021 documentary short film by director and musician Ben Makinen.

== Summary ==
The film delves into the systemic challenges faced by jazz musicians, exploring the dynamics between artists, club owners, and music distributors.

== Production ==
With a runtime of 22 minutes, Who Killed Jazz utilizes unused footage from Makinen's 2021 feature-length documentary JazzTown. In May 2021, Makinen sold his home in Colorado to help finance the film's completion while living in Bali, Indonesia. His video files were damaged during heavy rains, but he was able to recover them.

== Accolades ==
- Best Editing: Short Film, October 2021 Onkyo Film Awards
- Gold Award: Short Documentary, October 2021 Hollywood Gold Awards
- Best Short Documentary, October 2021 Naples Film Awards
- Best Documentary Short Film, 2021 Vancouver Bridge Fest
- Critics’ Choice Award, October 2021 World Film Carnival
