= List of P-Funk projects =

This is a chronological list of projects with significant contributions from P-Funk members. It also features notable pre-P-Funk and post-P-Funk projects from these members. The name of the P-Funk band or member is listed in bold.

== 1950s ==
=== 1956 ===
  - **The Parliaments** - "Sunday Kind Of Love"/"The Wind" (10")

=== 1959 ===
  - **The Parliaments** - "Poor Willie/Party Boys" (APT 25036) (7")

== 1960s ==
=== 1960 ===
  - **The Parliaments** -Lonely Island (Flipp 45–100) (7")

=== 1965 ===
  - Little Oovy Groovy, Ten Cent Movie
  - **The Parliaments** record demos for Motown
  - Roy Handy - "Monkey See, Monkey Do"/"Baby, That's A Groove" (Stephanye 334) (7")

=== 1966 ===
- November
  - **The Parliaments** - Heart Trouble/That Was My Girl (Golden World Records GW-46) (7")
  - Darrell Banks - "Open The Door To Your Heart"/"Our Love (Is In The Pocket)" (Revilot 201) (7")
  - J.J. Barnes - "Day Tripper"/"Don't Bring Me Bad News" (Ric Tic 115) (7")
  - The Debonaires - "Loving You Takes All Of My Time" (Solid Hit 102) (7")
  - The Fantastic Four - "Girl Have Pity"/"Live Up To What She Thinks" (Ric Tic 119) (7")
  - Pat Lewis - "Can't Shake It Loose"/"Let's Go Together" (Golden World 42) (7")
  - Pat Lewis - "Look At What I Almost Missed"/"No Baby, No" (Solid Hitbound 101) (7")
  - Theresa Lindsay - "I'll Bet You"/"Daddy-O" (Golden World 43) (7")

=== 1967 ===
  - **The Parliaments** - (I Wanna) Testify/I Can Feel The Ice Melting (Revilot RV 207) (7")
  - **The Parliaments** - "All Your Goodies Are Gone (The Loser's Seat)"/"Don't Be Sore At Me" (Revilot RV 211) (7")
  - **The Parliaments** - "Little Man"/"The Goose (That Laid The Golden Egg)" (Revilot RV 214) (7")
  - **The Parliaments** - "Look At What I Almost Missed"/"What Have You Been Growing" (Revilot RV 217) (7")
  - The Debonaires - "Headache In My Heart"/"I'm In Love Again" (Solid Hitbound 104) (7")
  - Flaming Embers - "Hey Mama (What'cha Got Good For Daddy)"/"Let's Have A Love In (Cause Everybody Needs Love)" (Ric Tic 132) (7")
  - Pat Lewis - "I'll Wait"/"Warning" (Solid Hitbound 105) (7")
  - Pat Lewis - "Baby, I Owe You Something Good"/"The Loser" (Solid Hitbound 112) (7")

=== 1968 ===
- April 27
  - J.J. Barnes - "Our Love Is In The Pocket"/"All Your Goodies Are Gone (instr.)" (Revilot RV 222) (7")
  - **The Parliaments** - "Good Ole Music"/"Time" (Revilot RV 223) (7")
  - **The Parliaments** - "A New Day Begins"/"I'll Wait" (Revilot RV 228) (7")
  - **Rose Williams** with **George Clinton** And **The Funkedelics** - "Whatever Makes My Baby Feel Good"/"Whatever Makes My Baby Feel Good (instr.)" (Funkedelic 6709) (7")
  - J.J. Barnes - "So Called Friends" (Revilot 225) (7")
  - The Holidays - "All That Is Required"/"I'll Keep Coming Back" (Revilot 226) (7")

=== 1969 ===
  - **The Parliaments** - "A New Day Begins"/"I'll Wait" (Atco 6675) (7")
  - **Funkadelic** - "Music For My Mother"/"Music For My Mother (instr.)" (Westbound W 148) (7")
  - **Funkadelic** - "Can't Shake It Loose"/"As Good As I Can Feel" (Westbound W 149) unreleased until 1993
  - **Funkadelic** - 7" "I'll Bet You"/"Qualify And Satisfy" (Westbound W 150) (7")
  - **Funkadelic** - 7" "I'll Bet You"/"Open Our Eyes" (Westbound W 150) (7")
  - **Funkadelic** - Funkadelic (Westbound 2000) (LP)
- July
  - **The Parliaments** appear on a PBS television series entitled Say Brother based in Boston. They perform "Testify" and an early version of "What Is Soul?"

== 1970s ==
=== 1970 ===
- April
  - **Funkadelic** - "I Got A Thing, You Got A Thing, Everybody's Got A Thing"/"Fish, Chips And Sweat" (Westbound W 158) (7")
  - **A Parliament Thang** - "I Call My Baby Pussycat"/"Little Ole Country Boy" (Invictus Is 9077) (7")
- July
  - **Parliament** - Osmium (Invictus) (LP)
- October
  - **Funkadelic** - Free Your Mind...And Your Ass Will Follow (Westbound 2001) (LP)
  - Ruth Copeland - Self Portrait (Invictus) (LP)
  - **Funkadelic** - "I Wanna Know If It's Good To You"/"I Wanna Know If It's Good To You (instr.)" (Westbound W 167) (7")

=== 1971 ===
  - **Funkadelic** - "You And Your Folks, Me And My Folks"/"Funky Dollar Bill" (Westbound W 175) (7")
  - **Parliament** - "Livin' The Life"/"The Silent Boatman" (Invictus INV 513 [UK]) (7")
- May
  - **Parliament** - "Red Hot Mama"/"Little Ole Country Boy" (Invictus Is-9091) (7")
- July
  - **Parliament** - "Breakdown"/"Little Ole Country Boy" (Invictus Is-9095) (7")
  - **Funkadelic** - Maggot Brain (Westbound 2007) (LP)
  - Ruth Copeland - I Am What I Am (Invictus) (LP)
  - **Funkadelic** - "Can You Get To That"/"Back In Our Minds" (Westbound W 185) (7")
- December
  - House Guests - "What So Never The Dance pt. 1"/"What So Never The Dance pt. 2" (7") **William "Bootsy" Collins**, **Phelps "Catfish" Collins**, and **Frank "Kash" Waddy**
  - House Guests - "My Mind Set Me Free pt. 1"/"My Mind Set Me Free pt. 2" (7") **William "Bootsy" Collins**, **Phelps "Catfish" Collins**, and **Frank "Kash" Waddy**

=== 1972 ===
  - **U.S.** music with **Funkadelic** - "I Miss My Baby"/"Baby I Owe You Something Good" (Westbound W 197) (7")
  - **Funkadelic** - "Hit It And Quit It"/"A Whole Lot Of BS" (Westbound W 198) (7")
  - **Parliament** - "Come In Out Of The Rain"/"Little Ole Country Boy" (Invictus Is-9123) (7")
  - **Parliament** - "Come In Out Of The Rain" (Invictus INV 522 [UK]) (7")
  - **Parliament** record "Loose Booty", "Fantasy Is Reality", and an "Unfinished Instrumental" that were not released until Osmium was reissued on CD in the 1990s
- May
  - **Funkadelic** - America Eats Its Young (Westbound 2022) (LP)
  - **Funkadelic** - "Loose Booty"/"A Joyful Process" (Westbound W 205) (7")
- June
  - The J.B.'s - Food For Thought (Polydor 5601) (LP) **William "Bootsy" Collins**, **Phelps "Catfish" Collins**, **Frank "Kash" Waddy**, and **Fred Wesley**
  - Bootsy, Phelps And The Complete Strangers - "Fun In Your Thang pt. 1"/"Fun In Your Thang pt. 2" (Philmore Sound R-30135/6) (7") **William "Bootsy" Collins**, **Phelps "Catfish" Collins**, **Frank "Kash" Waddy**, and **Gary "Mudbone" Cooper**
  - Bootsy, Phelps And Gary - "Together In Heaven pt. 1"/"Together In Heaven pt. 2" (Philmore Sound 740536) (7") **William "Bootsy" Collins**, **Phelps "Catfish" Collins**, **Frank "Kash" Waddy**, and **Gary "Mudbone" Cooper** (7")

=== 1973 ===
- July
  - **Funkadelic** - Cosmic Slop (Westbound 2022) (LP)
  - **Funkadelic** - "Cosmic Slop"/"If You Don't Like The Effect, Don't Produce The Cause" (Westbound W 218) (7")

=== 1974 ===
  - **Parliament** - "Up for the Down Stroke" (Casablanca NB 9003) (LP)
  - **Funkadelic** - Standing on the Verge of Getting It On (Westbound) (LP)
  - **Funkadelic** - "Standing On The Verge Of Getting It On"/"Jimmy's Got A Little Bit Of Bitch In Him" (Westbound W 224) (7")
- June
  - **Parliament** - "Up For The Down Stroke"/"Presence Of A Brain" (Casablanca NB 803) (7")
- August
  - **Parliament** - Up for the Down Stroke (Casablanca NBLP 7002) (LP)
- November
  - **Parliament** - "Testify"/"I Can Move You" (Casablanca NB 811) (7")

=== 1975 ===
  - **Funkadelic** - "Red Hot Mamma"/"Vital Juices" (Westbound W 5000) (7")
- April
  - Funkadelic - Let's Take It to the Stage (Westbound 215) (LP)
  - **Parliament** - Chocolate City (Casablanca NBLP-7014) (LP)
- May
  - **Parliament** - "Chocolate City"/"Chocolate City (long version)" (Casablanca NB 831) (7")
  - **Funkadelic** - "Better By The Pound"/"Stuffs And Things" (Westbound WT-5014) (7")
  - **Funkadelic** - "Let's Take It To The Stage"/"Biological Speculation" (Westbound WT-2026) (7")
  - **Funkadelic** - Funkadelic's Greatest Hits (Westbound) (LP)
- September
  - **Parliament** - "Ride On"/"Big Footin'" (Casablanca NB 843) (7")

=== 1976 ===
- February
  - **Parliament** - Mothership Connection (Casablanca 7022) (LP)
- April
  - **Bootsy's Rubber Band** - Stretchin' Out in Bootsy's Rubber Band (Warner Bros. 2920) (LP)
  - **Parliament**- Give Up the Funk (Tear the Roof off the Sucker) (Casblanca NB 856) (7")
- September
  - **Parliament** - The Clones of Dr. Funkenstein (Casablanca NBP-7034) (LP)
- September 26
  - **Funkadelic** - Hardcore Jollies (Warner Bros. 2973) (LP)
  - **Funkadelic** - Tales of Kidd Funkadelic (Westbound 227) (LP)
  - **Funkadelic** - "Undisco Kidd"/"How Do Yeaw View You" (Westbound WT-5029) (7")
  - **Fuzzy Haskins** - A Whole Nother Thang (Westbound 229) (LP)
- December 18
  - **Parliament** - "Star Child"/"Supergroovalisticprosifunkstication" (Casablanca NB 864) (7")

=== 1977 ===
- January
  - **Bootsy's Rubber Band** - Ahh... The Name Is Bootsy, Baby! (Warner Bros. 2972) (LP)
  - **Funkadelic** - The Best of the Early Years, Vol. 1 (Westbound) (LP)
  - **Eddie Hazel** - Game, Dames and Guitar Thangs (Warner Bros.) (LP)
  - **Fred Wesley And The Horny Horns** - A Blow for Me, A Toot for You (Atlantic 18214) (LP)
- May 5
  - **Parliament** - Live: P-Funk Earth Tour (Casablanca 7053) (LP)
- November 28
  - **Parliament** - Funkentelechy Vs. the Placebo Syndrome (Casablanca NBP-7084) (LP)

=== 1978 ===
- January
  - **Parliament** - "Flash Light"/"Swing Down Sweet Chariot" (Casablanca 909) (7")
  - **Bootsy's Rubber Band** - Bootzilla Warner Bros. 8512 (7")
- February
  - **Bootsy's Rubber Band** - Bootsy? Player of the Year (Warner Bros. 3093) (LP)
- April 15
  - **The Brides of Funkenstein** - Funk Or Walk (Atlantic 19201) (LP)
  - **Fuzzy Haskins** - Radio Active (Westbound 6102) (LP)
  - **Parlet** - Pleasure Principle (Casablanca 7094) (LP)
  - **Bernie Worrell** - All the Woo in the World (Arista Records 4209) (LP)
- May
  - **Parliament** - "Funkentelechy"/"Funkentelechy pt. 2" (Casablanca 921) (7")
- August
  - **Funkadelic** - "One Nation Under A Groove"/"One Nation Under A Groove pt. 2" (Warner Bros. 8618) (7")
  - **Quazar** - "Funk 'N' Roll (Dancin In The Funkshine)" (Arista 0349) (7")
- September
  - **Quazar** - Quazar (Arista Records) (LP)
  - **Funkadelic**- One Nation Under a Groove (Warner Brothers Records BSK 3209) (LP)
- November
  - **Parliament** - Motor Booty Affair (Casablanca NBP-7125) (LP)
  - **Parliament** - "Aqua Boogie (A Psychoalphadiscobetabioaquadoloop)"/"You're A Fish And I'm A Water Sign" (Casablanca 950) (7")

=== 1979 ===
  - **Funkadelic** - Uncle Jam Wants You (Warner Bros.) (LP)
  - **Parlet** - Invasion of the Booty Snatchers (Casablanca NBP-7146) (LP)
  - **Parliament** - Gloryhallastoopid (or Pin the Tail on the Funky) (Casablanca NBP-7195) (LP)
  - **Brides Of Funkenstein** - Never Buy Texas From A Cowboy (Atlantic 19261) (LP)
  - **Fred Wesley And The Horny Horns** - Say Blow By Blow Backwards (Atlantic) (LP)
- July
  - **Bootsy's Rubber Band** - This Boot Is Made for Fonk-N (Warner Bros. 3295) (LP)
  - **Mutiny** - Mutiny On The Mamaship (CBS) (LP)

== 1980s ==
=== 1980 ===
  - **Sweat Band** - Sweat Band (Uncle Jam 36857) (LP)
  - **Parlet** - Play Me or Trade Me (Casablanca 7224) (LP)
  - **Parliament** - Trombipulation (Casablanca NBP-7249) (LP)
  - **Philippé Wynne** - Wynne Jammin' (Uncle Jam/CBS Records) (LP)
- November
  - **Bootsy** - Ultra Wave (Warner Bros. 3433) (LP)
  - Zapp - Zapp (Warner Bros. 3463) (LP) **William "Bootsy" Collins**

=== 1981 ===
- March
  - **Funkadelic** - The Electric Spanking of War Babies (Warner Bros. 3482) (LP)
  - **Funkadelic** - Connections & Disconnections (LAX 37087) (LP)
  - **Godmoma** - Godmoma Here (LP)
  - Space Cadets - Space Cadets (Vanguard CSD 79442) (LP) **Bernie Worrell** and **Tyrone Lampkin**

=== 1982 ===
- May
  - **William "Bootsy" Collins** - The One Giveth, the Count Taketh Away (Warner Bros. 3667) (LP)
- November 5
  - **George Clinton** - Computer Games (Capitol 12246) (LP)

=== 1983 ===
  - **P-Funk All Stars** - Urban Dancefloor Guerillas (CBS Records 39168) (LP)
- December
  - **George Clinton** - You Shouldn't-Nuf Bit Fish (Capitol 7123081) (LP)
  - **Kiddo** - Kiddo (A&M Records) (LP)

=== 1984 ===
  - **Eramus Hall** - Gohead (LP)
  - Chops Horns - Chops (Atlantic Records) (LP) **Darryl Dixon** and **Dennis Chambers**
  - **Funkadelic** records By Way Of The Drum for MCA Records, eventually released in March 2007
  - **Kiddo** - Action (A&M Records) (LP)

=== 1985 ===
- July
  - **George Clinton** - Some of My Best Jokes Are Friends (Capitol CDP 7 96356 2) (LP)
  - Jimmy G. And The Tackheads - Federation Of Tackheads (Capitol Records) (LP)
- December 7
  - Artists United Against Apartheid - Sun City (Manhattan ST-53019) (LP) **George Clinton**
- Unknown
  - Sly Fox - Let's Go All the Way (Capitol) (LP)

=== 1986 ===
- May
  - **George Clinton** - R&B Skeletons in the Closet (Capitol CDP 7 96267 2) (LP)
  - **George Clinton/Parliament/Funkadelic** - The Mothership Connection - Live from Houston Capitol MLP-15021 (LP)
- September
  - **George Clinton** - The Best Of George Clinton Capitol ST-12534

=== 1987 ===
- April 17
  - Nona Hendryx - Female Trouble (album) (EMI CDP 7 46550 2) (LP) **George Clinton** and **Bernie Worrell**
  - Sly & Robbie - Rhythm Killers (Island Records BRCD 512) (LP) **William "Bootsy" Collins**, **Bernie Worrell**, and **Gary "Mudbone" Cooper**
  - Mico Wave - Cookin' From The Inside Out!!! (Columbia Records AL 40909) (LP) **William "Bootsy" Collins**, **Bernie Worrell**, **Phelps "Catfish" Collins**, and **Maceo Parker**

=== 1988 ===
  - **Bootsy Collins** - What's Bootsy Doin'? (CBS 462918 2) (CD)
  - **INCorporated Thang Band** - Lifestyles Of The Roach And Famous (Warner Bros. 9 25617-2) (CD)
  - Well Red - Respect Due (Virgin Records CDV 2548) (CD) **George Clinton**

=== 1989 ===
- August 7
  - **George Clinton** - The Cinderella Theory (Warner Bros./Paisley Park 925 994-2) (CD)
  - **George Clinton** - "Why Should I Dog U Out?" (Warner Bros./Paisley Park PRO-CD-3438) (CD single)
  - **George Clinton** - "Tweakin'" (Warner Bros./Paisley Park) (12")
- October 17
  - **George Clinton** George Clinton Presents Our Gang Funky (MCA Records MCAD-42048) (CD)
- Unknown
  - **Otis Day & the Knights** - " Shout" (CD)

== 1990s ==
=== 1990 ===
- April
  - **Bootsy's Rubber Band** - Jungle Bass (4th & Bway BRECD 550 846 339-2) (CD)
- August 20
  - Prince - Graffiti Bridge (Warner Bros./Paisley Park 7599-27493-2) (CD) **George Clinton**, **Garry Shider**, **Steve Boyd**, **Joseph "Amp" Fiddler**, **Tracey "Treylewd" Lewis**, **Michael "Clip" Payne**, and **Belita Woods**
  - **Mr. Fiddler** - With Respect (Elektra 9 60959-2) (CD)
  - **Bernie Worrell** - Funk Of Ages (Gramavision GRV 74602) (CD)
  - Stevie Salas - Colorcode (Island 91303-2) (CD) **William "Bootsy" Collins**, **Bernie Worrell**, and **Gary "Mudbone" Cooper**
  - Menace - Doghouse (Bite Records 656.224-2) (CD) **William "Bootsy" Collins**, **Bernie Worrell**, **Maceo Parker**, **Michael Hampton**, and **Gary "Mudbone" Cooper**
  - Limbo Maniacs - Stinky Grooves (In-Effect Records 88561-3015-2) **William "Bootsy" Collins** and **Maceo Parker**

=== 1991 ===
- January 25
  - Parliament - The Best Nonstop Mix Compilation (Casablanca/Polystar PSCW-1044)
- May 28
  - T.C. Ellis - True Confessions (Warner Bros./Paisley Park 9 27497-2) (CD) **George Clinton**, **Mallia Franklin**, **Michael "Clip" Payne**, **Garry Shider**, **Belita Woods**, **Paul Hill**, **Joseph "Amp" Fiddler**, and **Patricia Lewis**
- September 30
  - F.F.F. - Blast Culture (Epic Records EPC 468700-2) (CD) **Gary "Mudbone" Cooper** and **Michael "Clip" Payne**
  - Material - The Third Power (Axiom 422-848-417-2) (CD) **William "Bootsy" Collins**, **Gary Shider**, **Gary "Mudbone" Cooper**, **Bernie Worrell**, **Michael Hampton**, **Fred Wesley**, and **Maceo Parker**
  - Gotcha! - Words And Music From Da Low Lands (Ariola 262.060) (CD) **George Clinton**
  - Ground Zero - Future Of The Funk (Lethal Records LBR112) (CD) **William "Bootsy" Collins**
  - Momma Stud - Cockadoodledo (Virgin Records America2-91627) (CD) **Bernie Worrell**
  - Mr. Fiddler - With Respect(Elektra)(CD)

=== 1992 ===
- September
  - Go Fer Yer Funk - George Clinton and the P-Funk All Stars
- September 15
  - **Trey Lewd** - Drop The Line (Reprise 9 26319-2) (CD)
- September 29
  - Praxis - Transmutation (Mutatis Mutandis) (Axiom 314-512-338-2) (CD) **William "Bootsy" Collins** and **Bernie Worrell**
  - Hardware (band) - Third Eye Open (Hardware album) (Rykodisc RCD 10304) (CD) **William "Bootsy" Collins**, **George Clinton**, and **Gary "Mudbone" Cooper**
  - Music For Your Mother - Funkadelic (Westbound CDSEW2 055) (CD)

=== 1993 ===
- January
  - **George Clinton** - Sample Some of Disc Sample Some of Dat Volume 1 (AEM 25701) (CD)
- May 28
  - **George Clinton** - "Bubble Gum Gangster" (AEM 25661) (CD single)
  - The Goombas featuring **George Clinton** - "Walk the Dinosaur" (Capitol CDCL 693) (CD)
- June 28
  - **O. G. Funk** - Out of the Dark (Rykodisc RCD 10303) (CD)
- July 22
  - Umar Bin Hassan - Be Bop or Be Dead (Island/Axiom 314-518 048-2) (CD) - William "Bootsy" Collins and Bernie Worrell
- August 30
  - Dance on the Wild Side (AEM 25691-2) (CD)
- October 12
  - **George Clinton** - Hey Man, Smell My Finger (Warner Bros./Paisley Park 9-25518-2) (CD)
  - **Parliament Funkadelic P Funk Allstars** - Greatest Hits Live (1972-1993) (AEM 25821-2) (CD)
- December 13
  - **George Clinton** - "Martial Law (Hey Man Smell My Finger)" (Warner Bros./Paisley Park PRO-CD-5998-R) (CD single)
  - **George Clinton** - "Paint the White House Black" (Warner Bros./Paisley Park 9362-41057-2) (CD single)
  - **George Clinton** - Sample Some of Disc Sample Some of Dat Volume 2 (AEM 25741) (CD)
  - **Parliament Funkadelic P Funk Allstars** - Dope Dog (One Nation Records) (CD)
  - **Bernie Worrell** - Blacktronic Science (Gramavision R279474) (CD)
  - **Bernie Worrell** - Pieces of Woo: The Other Side (CMP CD 65) (CD)
  - **Andre Foxxe** - I'm Funk and I'm Proud (Blues Interaction PCD-2834) (CD)
  - **Zillatron** - Lord of the Harvest (Rykodisc 10301) (CD)
  - The Last Poets - Holy Terror (Rykodisc RCD 10319) (CD) - William "Bootsy" Collins, Bernie Worrell and George Clinton
  - **Parliament-Funkadelic** - Live 1976-1993 (Japan pressing) (P-Vine PCD-2755)
  - Foley - 7 Years Ago・・Directions in Smart-Alec Music(MoJazz)(CD)

=== 1994 ===
  - **Eddie Hazel** - Jams From The Heart (JDC 3452-2) (CD)
  - **Eddie Hazel** - Rest in P (P-Vine PCD-2884) (CD)
  - **Bootsy's New Rubber Band** - Blasters of the Universe (Rykodisc RCD90307/08) (CD)
  - **George Clinton & The P-Funk All Stars** P-Funk Unreleased Remix (P-Vine PCD-2752) (CD)
  - **P-Funk Guitar Army** - Tribute To Jimi Hendrix Vol. 1 (P-Vine PCD-2827) (CD)
  - Tribute To Jimi Hendrix / Return Of The Gypsy (P-Vine PCD-2847) (CD)
  - **Parliament Funkadelic**-Live 1976-1993 (UK pressing) (Sequel NEF CD 273)
- May 2
  - **George Clinton Parliament Funkadelic** - Music From The Motion Picture PCU (Fox Records 07822-10009-2) (CD)
- May 20
  - **Fred Wesley And The Horny Horns** - The Final Blow (Sequel Records NED CD 270) (CD)
- June 28
  - Slave Master - Under The 6 (Rykodisc RCD 10319) **Michael Hampton** and **Gary "Mudbone" Cooper**
- July 20
  - **George Clinton** - Sample Some Of Disc Sample Some Of Dat Volume 3 (AEM 25881) (CD)
- August
  - **Bootsy Collins**-Back in the Day: The Best of Bootsy (Warner Archives 9 26581-2) (CD)
- December 6
  - **Parliament - Funkadelic - P-Funk All Stars** - Dope Dogs (P-Vine PCD-1991) (CD)
  - Praxis - Sacrifist (Subharmonic SD 7002-2) (CD) **William "Bootsy" Collins** and **Bernie Worrell**

=== 1995 ===
- February 28
  - Dave Stewart - Greetings From The Gutter (East West Records 61735-2) (CD) **Bernie Worrell**, **William "Bootsy" Collins**, **Gary "Mudbone" Cooper**, and **Jerome "Bigfoot" Brailey**
- April 11
  - Friday Original Motion Picture Soundtrack (Priority 7243 8 40412 2 9) (CD) includes "You Got Me Wide Open" by **Bootsy Collins and Bernie Worrell**
- July 18
  - Funkcronomicon (Axiom 314-524 077-2) (CD)
- August
  - Bottom Jack: The Bass Project-Volume One (P-Vine PCD-4741) "Hanging Around"-Andre Foxxe featuring Flea.
- September
  - Bottom Jack: The Bass Project-Volume Two (P-Vine PCD-4742)

"Pretty Girl", "L.O.V.E. Baby"-Rodney "Skeet" Curtis; "The Final Frontier-Bill Laswell and Bootsy Collins

- October
  - **Tal Ross** - a.k.a. Detrimental Vasoline - Giant Shirley (Coconut Grove VGRC 9184-2) (CD)
  - Bottom Jack: The Bass Project-Volume Three (P-Vine PCD-4743)

"Jealous Hunts Love", "Bassically Speaking"-Andre Foxxe; "I'd Rather Be With You"(Live)-Bootsy's Rubber Band

  - October 24
  - In From The Storm - The Music Of Jimi Hendrix (BMG 74321 31550 2) (CD) includes a cover of "Purple Haze" by a group of musicians that includes **William "Bootsy" Collins**, **Bernie Worrell**, and **Dennis Chambers**
  - Panther - The Original Motion Picture Soundtrack (Mercury 525 479-2) (CD) includes "Black People" by **Funkadelic featuring George Clinton and Belita Woods**
  - Working Class Hero: A Tribute to John Lennon (Hollywood HR-62015-2) (CD) includes a cover of "Mind Games" by **George Clinton**
  - **Mallia Franklin** - Funken Tersepter (Blues Interaction PCD 4801) (CD)
  - Third Rail - South Delta Space Age (PolyGram 314 533 965-2) (CD) **Bernie Worrell**
  - **Bootsy Collins & Bootsy's New Rubber Band** - Keepin' Dah Funk Alive 4-1995 (Rykodisc RCD 90323/24) (CD)
- December 25
  - **George Clinton and Parliament Funkadelic** - Mothership Connection Newberg Session (Blues Interactions PCD-4778) (CD)

=== 1996 ===
- February 27
  - **Mutiny** - Aftershock 2005 (Rykodisc RCD 10334) (CD)
- June
  - **George Clinton & The P-Funk Allstars** - T.A.P.O.A.F.O.M. (Epic/550 Music 483833 2) (CD)
- October 29
  - **George Clinton** - Greatest Funkin' Hits (Capitol 7243 8 33911 2 7) (CD)
  - **Funkadelic** - Live: Meadowbrook, Rochester, Michigan – 12th September 1971 (Westbound CDSEWD 108) (CD)
- September 22
  - Enemy Squad - "Bob Dole Is on Drugs"/"If It Fits" (12") **Gabe Gonzalez**, **Michael "Clip" Payne**, **Steve Boyd**, **Belita Woods**, and **George Clinton**
  - Frogg - Froggadelic (Westbound WB CD-8005) (CD) **Louie "Babblin'" Kababbie**

=== 1997 ===
- August 26
  - Kyle Jason - Generations (Sony Music 488538 2) (CD) **William "Bootsy" Collins**, **Joseph "Amp" Fiddler**, **Ron Wright**, and **Steve Boyd** "Paul Hill"
  - **Bootsy Collins** - Fresh Outta 'P' University (WEA 3984 20262-2) (CD)
  - **Bernie Worrell** - Free Agent: A Spaced Odyssey (Polystar PSCR-5609) (CD)
  - **George Clinton & The P-Funk All Stars** - Live... And Kickin' (Intersound Inc. 9284) (CD)
  - Enemy Squad - United State Of... Mind (Tuf America Records USACD 8500) (CD) **DeWayne "Blackbyrd" McKnight**, **Joseph "Amp" Fiddler**, **Michael "Clip" Payne**, **Steve Boyd**, **Belita Woods**, "Paul Hill"**Louie "Babblin'" Kababbie**, **Gabe Gonzalez**, and **George Clinton**
  - Enemy Squad - "Return of the Swamp Thang"/"Prankster Boogie" (Tuf America Records) (12")

=== 1998 ===
- April 7
  - **George Clinton** - "Get Yo Ass In The Water And Swim Like Me" (Douglas Music ADC16) (CD single)
- August 25
  - Bill Laswell - Jazzonia (Douglas Music ADC 18) (CD) **William "Bootsy" Collins**
- November 24
  - Groovegrass - Groovegrass 101 Featuring Groovegrass Boyz (Reprise Records 9 47238-2) (CD) **William "Bootsy" Collins**

=== 1999 ===
- March 2
  - **Original P** - What Dat Shakin' (Westbound CDSEWM126) (CD)
- March 16
  - **Rick Gardner** - The Gardner Of Funk (A U Recordings AUR CD 3069) (CD)
  - **Rick Gardner** - The Gardner Of Funk 2 (A U Recordings AUR CD 3079) (CD)
- April 20
  - Buckethead - Monsters and Robots (Higher Octave COCD 47499) (CD) **William "Bootsy" Collins**
  - **Cacophonic FM** - After The Smoke Cleared (WEFUNK Records And Filmworks 2K AD-1) (CD)
- November 9
  - **Steve Boyd** - 4:20 Drive Time " Paul Hill" (Graduate Records 7 83707 27642 7) (CD)
- December 15
  - The Enemy Squad Presents Ultra Unit - The Angel Dust Theory (R.U.D.E. Records) (CD) **Gabe Gonzalez**, **Dawn Silva**, **Steve Boyd**, **Joseph "Amp" Fiddler**, and **George Clinton**

== 2000s ==
=== 2000 ===
- April 18
  - **Dawn Silva** - All My Funky Friends (Silva Sound 0 93652 32142 5) (CD)
  - Funk Kin - Funk Kin (J-Bird Records 6 1746 80351-2) (CD) **Garry Shider**

=== 2001 ===
- August 16
  - **Drugs** - The Prescription For Mis-America (WEFUNK Records And Filmworks 2K-AD1-Rx) (CD)
  - **Original P** - Introducing Hyped Up Westbound Soljaz (Westbound WBCD-1116) (CD)
  - **George Clinton: The Mothership Connection** (Pioneer Artists-PA-11664) (DVD)

"Paul Hill" Cd

=== 2002 ===
- June 11
  - **Garry Shider** - Diaperman Goes Starchild (Rawfunk Records & Filmworks) (CD)
  - **Garry Shider** - Diaperman, The Second Coming (Rawfunk Records & Filmworks) (CD)
  - **Michael Hampton** - Heavy Metal Funkason - The Domestic Grip (Rawfunk Records & Filmworks) (CD)
  - **Lige Curry** - An Introspective (CD)
  - **Lige Curry** - 4-Track Treasure Part II "And It Don't Stop Now!!" (CD)
  - **Andre Foxxe** - Myllenium (Rawfunk Records & Filmworks) (CD)
  - **Frankie "Kash" Waddy** - Ka$h Up Front (Rawfunk Records & Filmworks) (CD)
  - **Sheila Horne** - 7 Roses (Rawfunk Records & Filmworks) (CD)
- November 24
  - Prince - One Nite Alone... Live! (NPG Records) (CD) **Maceo Parker**, **Greg Boyer**, and **George Clinton**

=== 2003 ===
- November 19
  - **Bootsy Collins** - Play With Bootsy (East West Records 0927-49173-2) (CD)
  - **Kendra** - Myriadmorphonicbiocorpomelodicrealityshapeshifter (The C Kunspyruhzy 8 82137 00012 8) (CD)
  - **Sativa** - Jersey Girl (The C Kunspyruhzy 8 82137 00022 7) (CD)
  - **Kim Manning** - Begin Seed (PseudoHippie Records) (CD)
  - **Lili Haydn** - Light Blue Sun (Private Music 82876-50931-2) (CD)

=== 2004 ===
- April 20
  - Octavepussy featuring **George Clinton & Parliament Funkadelic** - (The Life of The) Funkshipz Captain (Funk To The Max) George Clinton, Garry "Doo Wop" Shider, Michael "Kidd Funkadelic" Hampton, Dwayne "Blackbyrd" McKnight, Joel "Razor Sharp" Johnson, Gary "Mudbone" Cooper, Robert "P-Nut" Johnson, Greg Thomas
- September 21
  - Colonel Claypool's Bucket of Bernie Brains - The Big Eyeball in the Sky (Prawn Song Records PSR-0006-3) (CD) **Bernie Worrell**

=== 2005 ===
  - Chops Horns - Blowout (CD) **Darryl Dixon**, **Dennis Chambers**, **Bernie Worrell**, and **Greg Fitz**
- September 1
  - Danny Bedrosian - Som'n Fierce (BOZFONK MOOSICK) (CD) **Garry Shider**, **Lige Curry**, and **Michael "Clip" Payne**
- September 6
  - **George Clinton And The P-Funk All Stars** - How Late Do U Have 2BB4UR Absent? - (The C Kunspyruhzy 10) (CD)
  - Parliament-Funkadelic: One Nation Under A Groove (documentary)

=== 2006 ===
  - **Eddie Hazel** - At Home (With Family) (Private Release Brenda Hazel) (CD)
- May 29
  - **Bootsy Collins And The New Rubber Band** - Live In Concert 1998 (ABC Entertainment/Charly Films CHF-F1012LF) (DVD/CD)
- Sept 1
  - Danny Bedrosian - Secret Army (BOZFONK MOOSICK) (CD) **Lige Curry**, **DeWayne "Blackbyrd" McKnight**, **George Clinton**, and **Michael "Clip" Payne**
  - Kim Manning - "The Love and Light Activation" (pseudohippie records) (CD) "George Clinton", "Eric Mcfadden", "Wally Ingram", "Norwood Fisher", "The Benevento/Russo Duo", "Jason Chang", "Lige Curry", "Greg Thomas", "Gary Shider", "Oneal Mclure", "Nate Oberman"

=== 2007 ===
  - Starr Cullars - Starr Cullars (CD) **Lige Curry** and **Michael Hampton**
  - Kacha - "Somebody's Watching You" (Van Record Company 74321 291022) (CD single) **William "Bootsy" Collins**
  - **Funkadelic** - By Way Of The Drum (Hip-O-Select Records) (CD), recorded in 1984
  - **Parliament** - The Casablanca Years: 1974-1980 (Universal Music-Japan)
  - **Danny Bedrosian and Secret Army** - The Sleaziest of the Greaze double disc (Bozfonk Moosick) **Danny Bedrosian**, **Lige Curry**, **Rico Lewis**, **Dewayne McKnight**, **Michael Payne**, and **George E. Clinton III**

=== 2008 ===
- September 16
  - George Clinton - George Clinton and His Gangsters of Love (CD)
- October 7
  - Funkadelic - Toys
- October 27
  - Freekbass - Junkyard Waltz (Bootsy Collins, Bernie Worrell)
- November 11
  - Science Faxtion - Living on Another Frequency (Bootsy Collins, Bernie Worrell)

=== 2009 ===
- April
  - U.S. Music With Funkadelic
- May
  - Danny Bedrosian and Secret Army-MUZZLE MOOSICK

Features Danny Bedrosian, Garry Shider, Lige Curry, Rico Lewis, Dewayne "Blackbyrd" Mcknight, Michael "Clip" Payne stubborn Kinda Fellow/ "Paul Hill" (Feat George Clinton)

=== 2010 ===
- July
  - Danny Bedrosian and Secret Army-MONSTER PEACE (**Danny Bedrosian**, **Lige Curry**, **Rico Lewis**, **Kendra Foster**)

=== 2011 ===
- March
  - Danny Bedrosian-SERI MISTIK (**Danny Bedrosian**)

- August 11 several members of Parliament-Funkadelic were featured on The Big Ol' Nasty Getdown 'Volume 1' including George Clinton, Garry Shider, Danny Bedrosian, Robert "P-Nut" Johnson, Belita Woods, Kendra Foster & Michael "Clip" Payne

=== 2012 ===
- September
  - Danny Bedrosian and Secret Army-LOST FROTH (**Danny Bedrosian**, **Rico Lewis**, **Lige Curry**, **Kendra Foster**)
- December
  - George Clinton and The P-Funk All-Stars-LIVE IN FRANCE (**George Clinton**, **P-Funk**)

=== 2013 ===
- September
  - Danny Bedrosian-SONGS FOR A BETTER TOMORROW (**Danny Bedrosian**, **Belita Woods**, **Lige Curry**, **Rico Lewis**, **Michael Clip Payne**)
