= Michael "Clip" Payne discography =

The Discography of the artist Michael "Clip" Payne.

== 1970s ==
=== 1975 ===
- Parliament - Chocolate City (Casablanca) (LP) Drums & Percussion (Credited as "Man in the Box")

=== 1978 ===
- Funkadelic - One Nation Under A Groove (Warner Bros.) (LP) Vocals

=== 1978 ===
- Parliament - Motor Booty Affair (Casablanca) (LP) Vocals

=== 1979 ===
- Funkadelic - Uncle Jam Wants You (Warner Bros.) (LP) Vocals
- Parliament - Gloryhallastoopid (or Pin the Tail on the Funky) (Casablanca NBP-7195) (LP) Choir, Chorus

== 1980s ==
=== 1980 ===
- Parliament - Trombipulation (Casablanca) (LP) Vocals

=== 1983 ===
- P-Funk All Stars - Urban Dancefloor Guerillas (CBS Records) (LP) Vocals
- George Clinton - You Shouldn't-Nuf Bit Fish (Capitol) (LP) Synthesizer, Bass, Vocals (background), Rhythm Arrangements

=== 1985 ===
- George Clinton - Some of My Best Jokes Are Friends (Capitol) (LP) Vocals (background)

=== 1989 ===
- George Clinton George Clinton Presents Our Gang Funky (MCA Records) (CD) Vocals

== 1990s ==
=== 1990 ===
- P-Funk All Stars - Live at the Beverly Theatre in Hollywood (Westbound Records Us) (CD) Vocals
- Prince - Graffiti Bridge (Warner Bros./Paisley Park) (CD) George Clinton, Garry Shider, Steve Boyd, Joseph "Amp" Fiddler, Tracey "Treylewd" Lewis, Michael "Clip" Payne, and Belita Woods

=== 1991 ===
- T.C. Ellis - True Confessions (Warner Bros./Paisley Park) (CD) George Clinton, Mallia Franklin, Michael "Clip" Payne, Garry Shider, Belita Woods, Paul Hill, Joseph "Amp" Fiddler, and Patricia Lewis

=== 1992 ===
- Trey Lewd - Drop The Line (Reprise) (CD) Vocals, Drum Programming
- Pochette Surprise (1992) Interpretation
- Parliament - Greatest Hits 1972-1993 Percussion, Vocals, Vocals (background), Bullhorn
- Rockets - Another Future ([Polydor]) (CD) Vocals, Backing vocals

=== 1994 ===
- P-Funk Guitar Army - Tribute To Jimi Hendrix Vol. 1 (P-Vine) (CD)

=== 1995 ===
- Parliament - Best of Parliament: Give Up the Funk Vocals (background)
- Funkcronomicon (Axiom) (CD) Vocals
- Parliament Funkadelic P Funk Allstars - Dope Dog (One Nation Records) (CD) Organ, Synthesizer, Bass, Guitar, Percussion, Drums, Vocals
- P-Funk All Stars - Hydraulic Funk (CD) Vocals

=== 1996 ===
- George Clinton & The P-Funk Allstars - T.A.P.O.A.F.O.M. (Epic/550 Music) (CD) Vocals
- Enemy Squad - "Bob Dole Is on Drugs"/"If It Fits" (12") Gabe Gonzalez, Michael "Clip" Payne, Steve Boyd, Belita Woods, and George Clinton

=== 1997 ===
- Enemy Squad - United State Of... Mind (Tuf America Records) (CD) DeWayne "Blackbyrd" McKnight, Joseph "Amp" Fiddler, Michael "Clip" Payne, Steve Boyd, Belita Woods, Louie "Babblin'" Kababbie, Gabe Gonzalez, and George Clinton
- Enemy Squad - "Return of the Swamp Thang"/"Prankster Boogie" (Tuf America Records) (12")

=== 1998 ===
- Various - Lost in Bass (Aim Records) Vocals (background), Drum Programming, Mixing
- Alex Gopher - You, My Baby & I (V2 Records) Vocals

=== 1999 ===
- Tony Allen - Black Voices Vocals
- Cacophonic FM - After The Smoke Cleared (WEFUNK Records And Filmworks 2K AD-1) (CD)

== 2000s ==
=== 2000 ===
- Funkadelic - Complete Recordings 1976-81

=== 2001 ===
- Drugs - The Prescription For Mis-America (WEFUNK Records And Filmworks) (CD)
- Bootsy Collins Glory B da Funk's on Me!: The Bootsy Collins Anthology (Rhino) Vocals
- 420 Funk Mob LIVE ON THE OFF DAYS(WEFUNK Records And Filmworks) (CD)

=== 2002 ===
- Parliament - Funked Up: The Very Best of Parliament Vocals (background)
- Various Artists - My House in Montmartre Vocals (background)

=== 2003 ===
- Red Hot Chili Peppers - Freaky Styley (Bonus Tracks) Vocals (background)
- Various Artists - Minimal Funk, Vol. 3
- George Clinton - Six Degrees of P-Funk: The Best of George Clinton & His Funky Family

=== 2004 ===
- Killa Will - All in the Game Producer, Engineer, Mixing
- University of Kentucky Mega Sax Ensemble - Full English Mower in the Bluegrass Sax (Tenor)

=== 2005 ===
- 420 Funk Mob LIVE IN SPAIN (Wefunk Ad2k Recordings & Filmworks)
- Danny Bedrosian - Som'n Fierce (BOZFONK MOOSICK) (CD) Garry Shider, Lige Curry, and Michael "Clip" Payne
- Parliament - Gold Vocals (background)
- The P-Funk All Stars - How Late Do U Have 2 B B 4 U R Absent? Producer
- George Clinton & Parliament Funkadelic - Live at Montreux 2004 [DVD] Vocals

=== 2006 ===
- Daryl Hall & John Oates - Home for Christmas Guitar (Acoustic), Guitar (Electric)

=== 2007 ===
- Cacophonic FM - Funky NY Jazz

=== 2008 ===
- Stoney Clove Lane - Stay with Me Clapping

=== 2009 ===
- Danny Bedrosian and Secret Army-MUZZLE MOOSICK Features Danny Bedrosian, Garry Shider, Lige Curry, Rico Lewis, Dewayne "Blackbyrd" Mcknight, Michael "Clip" Payne

=== 2010 ===
- 420 Funk Mob - Screamin' for More (Wefunk Ad2k Recordings & Filmworks)

=== 2016 ===
- Susanne Alt - Saxify (Venus Tunes) Vocals
