= Pedro Bell =

American artist, illustrator, and writer (1950–2019)

- Born: June 11, 1950; Chicago, Illinois U.S.
- Died: August 27, 2019 (aged 69); Evergreen Park, Illinois, U.S.
- Other names: Sir Lleb; Captain Draw
- Occupations: Artist; illustrator; writer
- Years active: 1973–1995

Pedro Bell (June 11, 1950 – August 27, 2019) was an American artist and illustrator, best known for his elaborate album cover designs and other artwork for numerous Funkadelic and George Clinton solo albums. Bell also wrote many of the liner notes of the records under the name Sir Lleb (his surname spelled backwards). The liner notes contributed to P-Funk's literary mythology — a sampling of his contributions include "Thumpasaurus", "Funkapus", "Queen Freakalene", "Bop Gun", and "Zone of Zero Funkativity". Bell's work was preceded and partially inspired by Sun Ra and was a precursor to the modern graphic novel and the Afro-punk movement.

== Early life ==
Born on June 11, 1950, Bell was born and raised in Chicago, Illinois. His family was very religious. Bell had older brothers.

Often sick as a child, Bell would read books and comics, especially Ace Comics. Bell said that he gained his artistic talent from his father, whom he described as frustrated artist; and his mother, who wrote and played the piano.

Bell attended Bradley University in Peoria, Illinois, where he said he was exposed to the Black Power movement and met activist Mark Clark. Bell donated artwork to the Black Panther Party and participated in a protest, which led to his expulsion from school.

Bell also attended Roosevelt University in Chicago, where he took art classes and studied with Don Baum.

== Career ==
=== Funkadelic ===
Between late 1969 and early 1970, Bell heard Funkadelic on the underground Chicago radio station WXFM for the first time. He began writing illustrated letters to the band and contacted their manager, Rod Scribner, in order to send him drawings and college-newspaper writing samples. Bell additionally created and mailed what he called "psychedelic envelopes", but since Funkadelic bandleader George Clinton was under investigation at the time by the RCMP for his involvement with the Process Church of the Final Judgement, the envelopes also were investigated.

Bell was hired to produce artwork for the band, beginning with local show posters, promotional items, and press kits. He moved on to album artwork, where he built a mythology that included slang, nicknames, and otherworld concepts that eventually became part of the artwork and liner notes of the Funkadelic records. Bell often came up with nicknames, which he called "tags", for people. The album cover artwork was credited under Bell's name, but the liner notes credited his work to Sir Lleb. Bell worked to reflect the band's atmosphere of its music and stage performances in his work, for which he used markers and felt-tipped pens because the fumes of the paint he used were too toxic, and he often traced the markers with acrylic due to issues with color separation from the printing process. The finished works were often 300 percent larger than the actual record covers for higher printing quality. Although he went to college, Bell considered himself to be self-taught. Bell said he created the original pieces on three foot square panels, and often would only have the record title, and would not have heard the music before creating the album artwork.

According to his biography via George Clinton's official website, Bell's "stream-of-contagion text rewrote the whole game. He single-handedly defined the P-Funk collective as sci-fi superheroes fighting the ills of the heart, society, and the cosmos…As much as Clinton's lyrics, Pedro Bell's crazoid words created the mythos of the band and bonded the audience together." However, Bell was often paid very little for his work, and if it was not through the record label, payment was either delayed or he had to ask for it up front. He therefore held regular jobs, including working in a bank and then a post office, but retained his association with the P-Funk family by often wearing day-glo wigs and psychedelic-inspired outfits. Bell additionally collaborated with Clinton on album cover artwork for Clinton's 1980s solo releases, but their relationship became further strained after Clinton began to collaborate with Prince.

=== Other projects ===
Bell had his own studio that he named Splankwerks, and in 1988, he created a cartoon for MTV called Larry Lazer. In addition to working on comic books (including a compilation titled Artusi Tribe) and screenwriting, Bell started a band called Tripzilla. In 1997, he published a zine titled ZEEP Magazine. According to Bell, the word was P-Funk slang for "deeper-than-deep".

== Censorship ==
Warner Brothers Music censored Bell's initial artwork for Funkadelic's 1981 album The Electric Spanking of War Babies. Deemed as inappropriate due to the cover featuring an overtly phallic spaceship that transported a naked woman, the work was edited, despite the fact that Funkadelic "was following up two consecutive million-selling records," while signed to Warner Bros. Bell revised The Electric Spanking of War Babies so the image was featured with a lime-green sketch of shape covering the majority of the cover art, which says, "Oh Look! The Cover that 'They' were TOO-SCARED to print!"

== Influences ==
Bell said that among his artistic influences were artist Ed Roth, especially how he incorporated cars into his artwork, and the work of cartoonist Robert Williams in advertising that appeared in Hot Rod magazine. He also cited Frank Zappa, Harlan Ellison, Hunter S. Thompson, Iceberg Slim and Tom Wolfe as influences.

Growing up, Bell read the Bible and was very influenced by the books of Genesis and Revelation. This led to an interest in science fiction, machinery, automotive technology, and then the surrealistic art of Salvador Dalí. Bell read extensively about dinosaurs and Godzilla, and also studied Latin.

== Personal life ==
In August 1996, Bell was declared legally blind. He struggled with health and poverty issues for much of his later life. In January 2010, the Black Rock Coalition held a fundraiser called "Miracle for a Maggot: Funkraiser for P-Funk Graphic Artist Pedro Bell" to help Bell.

On August 27, 2019, Bell died in Evergreen Park, Illinois at the age of 69. He had a son.

== Album illustrations ==
- 1973: Funkadelic, Cosmic Slop (Westbound Records)
- 1974: Funkadelic, Standing on the Verge of Getting It On (Westbound Records)
- 1975: Funkadelic, Let's Take It to the Stage (Westbound Records / 20th Century Records)
- 1976: Funkadelic, Hardcore Jollies (Warner Bros. Records)
- 1976: Funkadelic, Tales of Kidd Funkadelic (Westbound Records)
- 1978: Funkadelic, One Nation Under a Groove (Warner Bros. Records)
- 1979: Funkadelic, Uncle Jam Wants You (Warner Bros. Records)
- 1981: Funkadelic, The Electric Spanking of War Babies (Warner Bros. Records)
- 1982: George Clinton, Computer Games (Capitol Records)
- 1982: George Clinton, Atomic Dog (12 inch) (Capitol Records)
- 1983: George Clinton, You Shouldn't-Nuf Bit Fish (Capitol Records)
- 1985: George Clinton, Some of My Best Jokes Are Friends (Capitol Records)
- 1985: Jimmy G And The Tackhead, Federation of Tackheads (Capitol Records)
- 1986: George Clinton, R&B Skeletons in the Closet (Capitol Records)
- 1988: INCorporated Thang Band, Lifestyles of the Roach and Famous (Warner Bros. Records)
- 1989: Various artists, George Clinton Presents Our Gang Funky (MCA Records)
- 1991: Maggotron, Maggotron: Bass Man of the Acropolis (Pandisc)
- 1994: George Clinton, Dope Dogs (P-Vine)
- 1995: Axiom Funk, Funkcronomicon (Axiom)
- 1996: George Clinton and The P-Funk Allstars, T.A.P.O.A.F.O.M. (The Awesome Power of a Fully Operational Mothership) (Sony 550)
- 1996: George Clinton, Greatest Funkin' Hits (Capitol Records)
- 1998: Enemy Squad, United State of Mind (Tufamerica Records)
- 2005: George Clinton & the P-Funk All-Stars, How Late Do U Have 2BB4UR Absent? (The C Kunspyruhzy)
- 2007: Funkadelic, By Way of the Drum (Hip-O Select)

== Selected exhibitions ==
- 1994: Onli Studios, Second Annual Black Age of Comics Convention, South Side Community Art Center – Bronzeville, Chicago, Illinois
- 1999: Exit Art, Pedrodelic Art Exhibit – New York
- 2005: Gavin Brown's Enterprise, Drunk vs. Stoned 2 – New York
- 2007: BLACK AGE X Convention – Chicago
- 2007: Sympathy for the Devil: Art and Rock and Roll Since 1967, Museum of Contemporary Art, Chicago (September 29, 2007 – January 6, 2008) – Chicago
- 2009: Funkaesthetics: University of Toronto, Art Museum at the University of Toronto (February 12 – March 23, 2009); Confederation Centre Art Gallery (November 21, 2009 to February 28, 2010)
- 2018: Chicago Cultural Center, African American Designers in Chicago: Art, Commerce, and the Politics of Race (October 27, 2018 – March 3, 2019) – Chicago

== See also ==
- Albums with cover art by Pedro Bell
