= Muruga Booker discography =

Muruga Booker has played on many different recordings by a wide variety of artists including Weather Report, Bob Dylan, James Gurley, Tim Hardin, Al Kooper, Mitch Ryder, George Clinton, Bootsy Collins, David Peel, Babatunde Olatunji, Jerry Garcia, Merl Saunders, Buzzy Linhart and many more. He has appeared on albums released by A&M, Bear Family Records, Capitol Records, Chesky Records, Columbia Records, Elektra, Grateful Dead Records, P-Vine, Paramount Records, RCA Records, Relix Records, Uncle Jam and Verve Forecast, among others. He has also self-released many recordings on his own Musart record label through Bandcamp.

== Discography ==
- 1961 - Low Rocks - Blueberry Jam / Midnight Tears (single)
- 1962 - Low Rocks - Snooker (Like Pool) (single)
- 1964 - Jim and Jean - Changes
- 1965 - The Spike Drivers - I'm So Glad and Can't Stand The Pain (singles)
- 1966 - Jim and Jean - People World
- 1968 - Paul Winter Consort - Something in the Wind
- 1969 - Swami Satchidananda - Swami Satchidananda
- 1970 - Muruga Booker - Blue Hill Ocean Dance
- 1971 - Allen Ginsberg and Bob Dylan sessions - The Record Plant, New York, NY - Engineer - Jack Douglas (November 17, 1971)
- 1971 - The Rainbow Band - The Rainbow Band
- 1971 - Muruga - Rama Rama - Endless Path
- 1972 - Ursa Major - Ursa Major (with Dick Wagner)
- 1972 - Darius Brubeck - Chaplin's Back (with Michael Brecker, Amos Garrett, Perry Robinson and Richard Bock)
- 1972 - Gunter Hampel & His Galaxie Dream Band - Angel
- 1973 - Al Kooper - Naked Songs
- 1973 - Weather Report - Sweetnighter
- 1974 - Weather Report - Mysterious Traveller
- 1975 - Larry Nozero (Featuring Dennis Tini) - Time (as Muruga Sharma)
- 1975 - Allen Ginsberg - First Blues: Rags, Ballads & Harmonium Songs 1971 - 1974 (with Bob Dylan)
- 1976 - Michael Henderson - Solid
- 1978 - David Peel and Death - King of Punk
- 1978 - Michael Moss / Four Rivers - Cross Current
- 1978 - Mitch Ryder - How I Spent My Vacation
- 1979 - David Peel and Death - Junk Rock / I Hate You (single) (with Wayne Kramer)
- 1980 - David Peel and the Death-O-Lettes - Death To Disco
- 1981 - Funkadelic - The Electric Spanking of War Babies
- 1982 - Muruga Booker - Do It
- 1982 - George Clinton - Computer Games
- 1982 - Godmoma- Here (with Bootsy Collins)
- 1983 - Steven Bookvich & Anthony Kabbabie - Bay of Your Dreams
- 1983 - George Clinton - You Shouldn't-Nuf Bit Fish
- 1983 - P-Funk All Stars - Urban Dance Floor Guerillas
- 1984 - Muruga & The Soda Jerks - Boogie With You (single)
- 1985 - George Clinton - Some of My Best Jokes Are Friends
- 1986 - David Peel & The Muruga Experience - Animal In Love
- 1986 - Muruga Booker - Little Nada Drummer Boy
- 1986 - Muruga Booker - Terroristic Activity
- 1990 - Prem Das, Muruga, Shakti And Silve – Sonando Tambores (Dreaming Drums)
- 1990 - Merl Saunders and The Rainforest Band - Blues From the Rainforest (with Jerry Garcia)
- 1991 - Prem Das & Muruga - Ecstasy
- 1992 - Merl Saunders and The Rainforest Band - Save the Planet So We'll Have Someplace to Boogie
- 1992 - Muruga & Shakti - The Sacred Drum
- 1992 - Muruga U.F.M. (Unified Field Marshals) - Rock The Planet
- 1993 - George Clinton - Hey Man, Smell My Finger
- 1993 - George Clinton and the P-Funk All Stars - Testing Positive 4 The Funk
- 1993 - Relix Records Bay Rock Sampler #5 - Murgua UFM - Thought Of You
- 1994 - Sikiru Adepoju, Muruga, Babatunde Olatunji - Cosmic Rhythm Vibrations
- 1994 - Allen Ginsberg - Holy Soul Jelly Roll: Poems & Songs(with Bob Dylan and Happy Traum)
- 1994 - FOOM - Earth Sauce
- 1995 - P-Funk All Stars - Dope Dogs
- 1995 - P-Funk All Stars - Hydraulic Funk
- 1995 - Low Rocks – Blueberry Jam / Midnight Tears (Get Hip Archive Series)
- 1995 - David Peel & the Lower East Side - Up Against the Wall
- 1996 - Thunder Rocks - On the Rampage
- 1998 - Various Artists - The Sabre Records Story
- 1998 - Merl Saunders & the Rainforest Band - Fiesta Amazonica
- 2001 - Muruga GVCB Global Village Ceremonial Band - God Bless America - Find The Love & Peace Inside
- 2002 - Dennis K. Chernin, Muruga Booker - How to Meditate Using Chakras, Mantras, and Breath
- 2002 - Spike Drivers - Folkrocking Psychedelic Innovation From The Motor City In The Mid 60s
- 2003 - Muruga & The Global Village Ceremonial Band - One Global Village
- 2003 - David Peel - Rock 'N' Roll Outlaw: The Apple and Orange Recordings (16-CD box set)
- 2003 - Global Jazz Trio - White Christmas Holiday Jazz & Spirits
- 2003 - Buzzy Linhart - Presents the Big Few
- 2004 - Global Jazz Trio - Live at The Ark / Music, Books, Coffee Crossings & Borders
- 2005 - Babatunde Olatunji - Circle of Drums
- 2005 - Free Funk - Free Funk
- 2005 - Global Jazz Trio - Live in Detroit: Global Jazz Trio at Baker's Keyboard Lounge
- 2005 - Swami Satchidananda - The Woodstock Years
- 2006 - Muruga & The Global Village Ceremonial Band - Muruga & The Global Village Ceremonial Band
- 2006 - Brian Curtin - I've Got A Joke for You!
- 2007 - Muruga / Robinson Dyad - Bubble Waves
- 2007 - George Kerby - Out of the Corridor
- 2008 - Northwoods Improvisers, Faruq Z. Bey, Muruga, Arthur Doyle, Acid Birds - Velvet Box
- 2009 - Global Jazz Project - Out Of This World: Live At The 30th Annual Detroit International Jazz
- 2009 - Peter Walker - Long Lost Tapes 1970
- 2009 - Global Jazz Project - Global Visions
- 2009 - Global Jazz Project - Tour of the Planet
- 2010 - Muruga Booker & Ralph Koziarski - Solstice Trance Mission
- 2010 - Various Artists - Qbico U-nite VI VII, Detroit Buffalo, USA
- 2011 - Muruga Free Funk - Back 2 The Tribe
- 2011 - Prem Das, Muruga, Shakti – Journey Of The Drums (cleaned and remastered)
- 2012 - Muruga Booker, Pandit Samir Saha, John Churchville - Joty Drums
- 2013 - Muruga & The Cosmic Hoedown Band - Changing The Sound of Your Room
- 2013 - Muruga Booker & Perry Robinson - The Muruga - Perry Box
- 2013 - Woodstock 40 Years On: Back to Yasgur's Farm (with Tim Hardin)
- 2014 - The New Newz - Deer Dreamers
- 2014 - The Muruga Band - Michigan Mud
- 2014 - David Leikam, Muruga Booker - After the Ice Cream
- 2015 - Various Artists - Michigan Box - 1950s & 1960s Oddball Labels (The Low Rocks, The Thunder Rocks)
- 2015 - Muruga & The Cosmic Hoedown Band meet George Clinton & P-Funk All-Stars - The Fathership - Mothership World Connection
- 2016 - Harmonium - Inner Galactic Flow
- 2016 - Harmonium - Inner Excursion
- 2016 - Harmonium - Synthonic Nada Boom
- 2016 - Muruga & The Cosmic Hoedown Band - Harmonious World
- 2016 - Muruga & The Global Village Ceremonial Band - Stop Chaos & Step Into Paradise
- 2016 - Muruga Booker - TEKYES
- 2016 - The Muruga Band - Mystic World
- 2016 - Muruga Booker - Untrapped Drums
- 2016 - Muruga & The Worms - Muruga & The Worms (with James Gurley)
- 2016 - Muruga Booker - Funky Space Drum
- 2016 - Muruga Booker - Muruga (originally on cassette 1980's, Digital release)
- 2016 - Perry Robinson & Muruga Booker - Essence
- 2016 - Peter Walker & Muruga Booker - Spirit Callers
- 2016 - priest muruga booker the least - Spirit Rock Revival
- 2016 - Priest Steven Muruga Booker - Priest Steven Speaks
- 2016 - Priest Steven Muruga Bookvich & Alex Terzian - Kiss of Peace
- 2016 - Muruga Blues Band - Fool's Blues
- 2016 - T (Featuring Muruga & Madcat Ruth) - Deer Camp (single)
- 2016 - The ORIGINAL Global Village Ceremonial Band - Art-Official Intelligence
- 2016 - Muruga Booker - Trance Pulsations
- 2016 - Wormhole Cafe (feat. P-Funk All-Stars & more) - At The Wormhole Cafe
- 2016 - Muruga, Tom and The Foreign Twoglets - Pigdeeroo
- 2017 - Booker Blues All Stars - Booker Plays Hooker
- 2017 - Muruga Booker - Bio-Harmonic Rhythms
- 2017 - Muruga Booker - Memory Eternal (A Drum Vigil for Merl Saunders)
- 2017 - Mighty Michael, Peter Madcat Ruth, Muruga Booker - Passing The Torch
- 2017 - Muruga Booker & Mark Hershberger - Sound Games
- 2017 - Rick Jacobi - Night Shift
- 2017 - Muruga Booker - Sound Med Vol. 1
- 2017 - Spacecraft - Launch
- 2017 - The Priest Band - There is a Light
- 2017 - Worlds Within - Down Home in The Cosmos
- 2017 - Muruga & The Global Village Ceremonial Band - One Global Village (remastered)
- 2017 - Muruga & The Global Village Ceremonial Band - Muruga & The Global Village Ceremonial Band (remastered)
- 2017 - Muruga & The Microtones - Spirit Jam
