= Funkcronomicon =

Compilation album by Axiom Funk
- Released: July 18, 1995
- Recorded: 1989–1995
- Genre: Funk, dance, rock, electronica, soul
- Length: 90:09
- Label: Axiom, Island Records
- Producer: Bill Laswell

P-Funk collective chronology
Dope Dogs (1994)	Funkcronomicon (1995)	T.A.P.O.A.F.O.M. (1996)

Bill Laswell chronology
Subsonic 2: Bass Terror (1995)	Funkcronomicon (1995)	Second Nature (1995)

Professional ratings
Review scores
Source	Rating
Allmusic	4/5 stars
Billboard	(favorable)
Robert Christgau	(1-star Honorable Mention)
CMJ	(favorable)
Entertainment Weekly	(A−)
The Independent	(favorable)
Rolling Stone	4/5 stars
Trouser Press	(favorable)
Vibe	(favorable)

Funkcronomicon is a 1995 various artists collection of tracks produced by Bill Laswell under the name Axiom Funk, after Laswell's associated record label. It is a 2-CD set that was released by Island Records. Funkcronomicon features heavy participation from various members of Parliament-Funkadelic, to the degree that Funkcronomicon is widely considered to be a full-fledged P-Funk album. The album features what may be Pedro Bell's last authentic artistic renderings, as well as P-Funk guitarist Eddie Hazel's last recordings before his death in 1992. The album comprises newly recorded tracks, as well as tracks that have been featured on other Bill Laswell productions. Produced and compiled at Greenpoint Studio in the Greenpoint neighborhood of Brooklyn, New York, Funkcronomicon contains songs that were recorded as early as Maceo Parker's For All the Kings Men (1989) period. The album title is a play on Necronomicon, a fictional book.

== Track listing ==
Disc one

1. Order Within The Universe (written by Bernie Worrell, Bill Laswell) 3:17
2. Under The Influence (Jes Grew) (written by George Clinton, B Laswell, B Collins, Sly Dunbar, Robbie Shakespeare) 5:45
3. If 6 Was 9 (written by Jimi Hendrix) 6:00
4. Orbitron Attack (written by Grace Cook [a pseudonym for Eddie Hazel]) 12:29
5. Cosmic Slop (written by G Clinton, B Worrell) 5:15
6. Free-Bass (Godzillatron Cush) (written by B Laswell, B Collins, Dennis Weeden) 5:43
7. Tell The World (written by B Collins, Maceo Parker, Sylvester Stewart) 3:53
8. Pray My Soul (written by G Cook) 5:08

Disc two

1. Hideous Mutant Freekz (written by G Clinton, B Collins, B Worrell, B Laswell) 7:25
2. Sax Machine (written by B Collins, M Parker, Bobby Byrd) 7:47
3. Animal Behavior (written by B Laswell, B Collins, Buckethead) 7:09
4. Trumpets And Violins, Violins (written by J Hendrix) 3:38
5. Telling Time (written by Nicky Skopelitis) 4:57
6. Jungle Free-Bass (written by B Laswell, B Collins) 5:38
7. Blackout (written by DeWayne "Blackbyrd" McKnight) 3:44
8. Sacred To The Pain (written by G Cook, Umar Bin Hassan) 4:54

== Personnel ==
Producer: Bill Laswell

"Order Within The Universe"

- Organ: Bernie Worrell
- Turntable: DXT
- Bass, Beats, Sound EFX: Bill Laswell

"Under The Influence"

- Vocals: George Clinton, Gary Cooper, Bootsy Collins, Michael Payne, Debra Barsha, Zhana Saunders
- Guitar: Bootsy Collins
- Piano: Herbie Hancock
- Bass: Robbie Shakespeare
- Drums: Anton Fier
- Drum Programming: Sly Dunbar
- Congas: Daniel Ponce
- Cowbell, Percussion: Aïyb Dieng
- Tuba: Edwin Rodriguez
- Baritone Horn, Euphonium: Joe Daly
- Trumpet, Flugelhorn: Ted Daniel
- Bassoon: Janet Grice
- Tenor Saxophone, Flute: J.D. Parron
- Horns arranged: Henry Threadgill

"If 6 Was 9"

- Lead Vocals, Space Bass: Bootsy Collins
- Guitar: DeWayne "Blackbyrd" McKnight, Nicky Skopelitis
- Backwards Guitar: Robert Musso
- Intro Guitar: Buckethead
- Violin: Lili Haydn

"Orbitron Attack"

- Guitar: Eddie Hazel
- Space Bass: Bootsy Collins
- Organ: Bernie Worrell
- Drums: Jerome "Bigfoot" Brailey

"Cosmic Slop"

- Vocals: Garry Shider, Gary "Mudbone" Cooper
- Guitar: Garry Shider, Bootsy Collins, Michael Hampton
- Organ: Bernie Worrell
- Fairlight: Nicky Skopelitis
- Bass: Robbie Shakespeare
- Drums: Sly Dunbar
- Congas: Aïyb Dieng
- Material Strings Arranger & Conductor: Karl Berger

"Free-Bass"

- Free-Bass: Zillatron (Bootsy Collins)
- Stun Guitar: Menace (the Dawg of the C)

"Tell The World"

- Vocals: Maceo Parker, Bobby Byrd, Godmoma
- Keyboards, Voice: Sly Stone
- Other Music: Bootsy Collins

"Pray My Soul"

- Guitar: Eddie Hazel
- Organ: Bernie Worrell

"Hideous Mutant Freekz"

- Vocals: George Clinton, Garry Shider, Gary "Mudbone" Cooper, Bootsy Collins
- Guitar, Space Bass: Bootsy Collins
- Guitar Solo: Buckethead
- Synth: Bernie Worrell
- Drum Loops: Anton Fier

"Sax Machine"

- Vocals: Maceo Parker, Bobby Byrd, Bootsy Collins
- Alto Saxophone: Maceo Parker
- Trombone: Fred Wesley
- Guitar, Bass: Bootsy Collins
- Low Bass: Bill Laswell
- Synth: Bernie Worrell
- Percussion: Timothy "T-Bone" David

"Animal Behavior"

- Lead Vocals, Space Bass: Bootsy Collins
- Organ: Bernie Worrell
- Guitar: Buckethead
- Turntables: Af Next Man Flip
- Drums: Brain
- Samples: Bill Laswell

"Trumpets and Violins, Violins"

- Voice: Abiodun Oyewole
- Guitar: Blackbyrd McKnight, Nicky Skopelitis, Robert Musso
- Processing: Robert Musso
- Intro Guitar: Buckethead
- Violin: Lili Haydn

"Telling Time"

- 6 & 12 String Guitars: Nicky Skopelitis
- Organ: Amina Claudine Myers
- Bass: Bill Laswell
- Drums: Joseph "Zigaboo" Modeliste
- Congas: Guilherme Franco

"Jungle Free-Bass"

- Jungle Bass: Bootsy Collins
- Dub Bass: Bill Laswell
- Vocal Sounds: Torture

"Blackout"

- Guitar, Bass, Drums: Blackbyrd McKnight

"Sacred To The Pain"

- Guitar: Eddie Hazel
- Organ: Bernie Worrell
- Voice: Umar Bin Hassan
