= The Cinderella Theory =

Studio album by George Clinton
- Released: August 2, 1989
- Studios: United Sound Systems, Detroit
- Genres: Funk, dance, R&B
- Length: 45:18 (vinyl); 54:05 (CD)
- Label: Paisley Park/Warner Bros.
- Producer: George Clinton

George Clinton chronology
R&B Skeletons in the Closet (1986)	The Cinderella Theory (1989)	Hey Man, Smell My Finger (1993)

Professional ratings
Review scores
Source	Rating
AllMusic	3/5 stars
Chicago Tribune	3/4 stars
Orlando Sentinel	3/4 stars
The Philadelphia Inquirer	(favorable)
The Rolling Stone Album Guide	3.5/5 stars
Spin Alternative Record Guide	8/10
The Village Voice	A−
The Virgin Encyclopedia of Popular Music	3/5 stars
Yahoo! Music	(unfavorable)

The Cinderella Theory is the fifth studio album by American funk musician George Clinton, released August 2, 1989, on Paisley Park Records. It was released three years after his previous studio effort, R&B Skeletons in the Closet, which was his last album for Capitol Records. The Cinderella Theory represented a comeback of sorts for Clinton, who had been largely absent from the pop music scene since his last album for Capitol. The album was produced by Clinton for Baby Clinton Inc.

== Track listing ==
Side One
No.	Title	Writer(s)	Length
1.	"Airbound"	Tracey Lewis	4:21
2.	"Tweakin' (Featuring Public Enemy)" (released as a single-Paisley Park 7-22790 and as a 12" single-Paisley Park 0–21337)	Bob Bishop, David Spradley, Chuck D, Flavor Flav	6:21
3.	"Cinderella Theory"	George Clinton, Amp Fiddler	5:09
4.	"Why Should I Dog U Out?" (released as a single-Paisley Park 7-27557 and as a 12" single-Paisley Park 021157)	G. Clinton, DeWayne McKnight, Fiddler, B. Merrill	6:28
Total length:			22:19

Side Two
No.	Title	Writer(s)	Length
5.	"Serious Slammin'"	Lelan Zales, Greg Crockett	4:56
6.	"There I Go Again"	G. Clinton, Fiddler, Joe Harris	4:56
7.	"(She Got It) Goin' On"	Shawn Clinton, Fiddler	4:27
8.	"Banana Boat Song"	Irving Burgess, William Attaway	4:06
9.	"French Kiss"	G. Clinton, McKnight, Steve Washington, Andre Foxxe Williams	3:58
10.	"Airbound (Reprise)"	Lewis	0:36
Total length:			22:59 45:18

CD bonus tracks
No.	Title	Writer(s)	Length
10.	"Rita Bewitched"	Lewis, G. Clinton	5:00
11.	"Kredit Kard"	G. Clinton, Clip Payne	3:47
12.	"Airbound (Reprise)"	Lewis	0:36
Total length:			54:05

== Personnel ==
- Keyboards: Joseph Fiddler, David Spradley, Bill Brown, Greg Crockett
- Bass: Bootsy Collins, DeWayne "Blackbyrd" McKnight, Andre Foxxe Williams, Steve C. Washington
- Guitar: DeWayne "Blackbyrd" McKnight, Bootsy Collins, Tracey Lewis, Andre Foxxe Williams
- Drums, drum programming: William Payne, Dean Ragland, Lelan Zales, Richie Stevens
- Scratchin': Anthony Jones, Darrin
- Tenor saxophone: Eric Leeds
- Trumpet: Atlanta Bliss
- Flute: Michael Harris
- Percussion: Larry Fratangelo
- Spoons: AJ
- Vocals: Pat Lewis, Sheila Washington, Jimmy Giles, Sandra Feva Dance, Lige Curry, Belita Woods, Tambra Makowsky, Navarro Berman, Pennye Ford, Patty Curry, Jenny Peters, Dean Ragland, Robert "P-Nut" Johnson, Joe Harris, Andre Foxxe Williams, Paul Hill, Tracey Lewis, Jessica Cleaves, Karen Foster, Anita Johnson, Louis Kabbabie, Mike Harris, Garry Shider, Daryl Johnson, Daryl Clinton, Shirley Hayden, Steve Boyd, Angela Workman, Doc Holiday
