= R&B Skeletons in the Closet =

Studio album by George Clinton
- Released: April 1986
- Recorded: 1985–1986
- Studios: United Sound Systems, Detroit; Baby'O Recorders, Hollywood; Ground Control Studios, Burbank, California
- Genres: Funk, dance, R&B, electro, hip hop
- Length: 42:47
- Label: Capitol
- Producers: George Clinton, Steve Washington, Garry Shider, Andre Jackson

George Clinton chronology
| Some of My Best Jokes Are Friends (1985) | R&B Skeletons in the Closet (1986) | The Cinderella Theory (1989) |

Professional ratings
Review scores
| Source | Rating |
|---|---|
| Allmusic | 3.5/5 stars |
| Billboard | (favorable) |
| Chicago Tribune | (favorable) |
| Los Angeles Times | (mixed) |
| The Miami Herald | (favorable) |
| The New York Times | (favorable) |
| Virgin Encyclopedia | 3/5 stars |
| Yahoo! Music | (mixed) |
| The Village Voice | B+ |

R&B Skeletons in the Closet is the fourth solo album by Parliament-Funkadelic leader George Clinton. It was released in April 1986 by Capitol Records and was the last album that Clinton would record for the label. Recording sessions for the album utilized a small cadre of P-Funk musicians including Bootsy Collins, Garry Shider, and DeWayne "Blackbyrd" McKnight, as well as the debut recorded appearance of former Miss America Vanessa L. Williams on the opening track "Hey Good Lookin'". R&B Skeletons in the Closet was produced by Clinton, Steve Washington, Shider, and Andre Jackson.

The album's concept deals with black musical artists attempts to "cross over" to white audiences and losing their core black audience in the process. R&B Skeletons in the Closet expands on the dance-funk sound of Clinton's previous solo albums, and it also incorporates elements of electro and hip hop music. The album was reissued on CD by Capitol Records in 1991, but went out of print shortly thereafter.

== Track listing ==
Side One
| No. | Title | Writer(s) | Length |
|---|---|---|---|
| 1. | "Hey Good Lookin'" (released as single Capitol 5602 and as a 12" single-Capitol 9729) | Steve Washington, George Clinton, Garry Shider | 6:03 |
| 2. | "Do Fries Go with That Shake?" (released as single Capitol 5558 and as a 12" single-Capitol SPRO 9628) | Steve Washington, Sheila Washington, G. Clinton | 5:57 |
| 3. | "Mix Master Suite" a. "Startin' From Scratch" b. "Counter Irritant" c. "Nothin' Left To Burn" | G. Clinton | 8:40 |
| Total length: | | | 20:40 |

Side Two
| No. | Title | Writer(s) | Length |
|---|---|---|---|
| 1. | "Electric Pygmies" | G. Clinton | 6:38 |
| 2. | "Intense" (originally featured on the soundtrack to the movie Iron Eagle) | G. Clinton | 6:28 |
| 3. | "Cool Joe" | Kevin Burke, Andre Jackson, G. Clinton | 4:17 |
| 4. | "R&B Skeletons (In the Closet)" (released as single Capitol 5642 and as a 12" single-Capitol V-15263) | G. Clinton, David Spradley | 4:44 |
| Total length: | | | 22:07 42:47 |

== Personnel ==
- Guitar: DeWayne McKnight, Bootsy Collins, Andre Williams, Stevie Salas, Jack Sherman
- Bass: Steve Washington
- Keyboards: Joseph Fiddler, Andre Williams, Loic Gambas, Z O, Kevin Burton, Steve Washington, David Spradley
- Saxophone, flute: Maceo Parker
- Trombone: Fred Wesley
- Piano: Ed Johnson, Loic Gambas
- Timbales: Lelan Zales
- Drum programming: Steve Washington, Fred Johnson, Z O
- Scratch mix: Anthony Bryant
- Mix-master orchestra: Ed Johnson, John Johnson, Paula Hachalter, Jim Hay, Murray Adler, William Reichenbach, Donald Ashworth, Rick Marotta
- Vocals: Kevin Burke, Shirley Jackson, Pat Lewis, Sandra Feva, Jessica Cleaves, Garry Shider, Joe Harris, Michael Payne, Andre Williams, Vanessa L. Williams, Debra Barsha, Bootsy Collins, Sheila Washington, Stefan Frank, Steve Boyd, Lige Curry, Robert "P-Nut" Johnson
