= Hey, Man, Smell My Finger =

Studio album by George Clinton
- Released: October 12, 1993
- Recorded: 1992–1993
- Studios: Paisley Park, Chanhassen, Minnesota, U.S.
- Genres: Funk; hip-hop; R&B; dance
- Length: 1:10:15
- Label: Paisley Park
- Producers: George Clinton (all), Kerry Gordy (tracks 1, 2 and 14), William Bryant III (tracks 1, 2 and 14), DeWayne McKnight (track 4), Foley (tracks 3, 5 and 12), Dallas Austin (track 6), Prince (track 8), Bill Laswell (track 11), Garry Shider (tracks 12 and 13)

George Clinton chronology
The Cinderella Theory (1989)	Hey, Man, Smell My Finger (1993)	T.A.P.O.A.F.O.M. (1996)

Hey, Man, Smell My Finger is the sixth studio album by American funk musician George Clinton, released October 12, 1993, on Paisley Park Records. It is Clinton's second and last release for the Paisley Park label, owned by Prince. The album features an array of musical guests including Prince, Dallas Austin, Humpty Hump (Shock G) from Digital Underground, Ice Cube, N'Dea Davenport, Dr. Dre, and Herbie Hancock, as well P-Funk alumni including Bootsy Collins, Bernie Worrell, Maceo Parker, and Fred Wesley. Hey, Man, Smell My Finger furthers Clinton's incorporation of hip-hop elements such as electronically produced beats, rapping by Clinton, and sampling of older P-Funk material.

== Reception ==
Professional ratings
Initial reviews
Review scores
Source	Rating
The Baltimore Sun	(favorable)
Robert Christgau	A−
Entertainment Weekly	A
The Independent	(favorable)
Orlando Sentinel	4/4 stars
Rolling Stone	4/5 stars
Select	2/5 medals
USA Today	3.5/4 stars
The Village Voice	(favorable)
Yahoo Music	(favorable)

Professional ratings
Retrospective reviews
Review scores
Source	Rating
AllMusic	4/5 stars

Hey, Man, Smell My Finger was acclaimed by most music critics and was followed by a supporting tour. The New Yorker called it "a funny, psychedelic, intricate collection of grooves and insights." The album went out of print soon after Paisley Park Records folded in late 1993.

== Track listing ==
No.	Title	Writer(s)	Length
1.	"Martial Law"	George Clinton; William Bryant; Kerry Gordy	7:13
2.	"Paint the White House Black" (featuring Ice Cube, Dr. Dre, Chuck D, Public Enemy, Yo-Yo, MC Breed, Kam & Shock G)	Clinton; Barrett Strong; Norman Whitfield; Gordy; Bryant	7:49
3.	"Way Up"	Clinton; Foley	5:07
4.	"Dis Beat Disrupts"	Clinton; William Payne; Lewis	3:29
5.	"Get Satisfied(Williiam Payne...)"	Lewis	3:55
6.	"Hollywood"	Lewis; Dallas Austin	5:21
7.	"Rhythm & Rhyme"	Clinton; Galma; P. Hope	5:40
8.	"The Big Pump"	Clinton; Prince	3:34
9.	"If True Love"	Clinton; Lewis	3:57
10.	"High In My Hello"	Clinton; Steve Washington	5:16
11.	"Maximumisness"	Clinton; Bill Laswell; William "Bootsy" Collins	5:02
12.	"Kickback"	Clinton; Lewis; Steven Boyd; Phelps "Catfish" Collins	3:41
13.	"The Flag Was Still There"		5:58
14.	"Martial Law" (single version)		4:13
Total length:			1:10:15

== Singles ==
1. "Paint the White House Black" – Paisley Park 9 41057-2 (CD maxi-single); Paisley Park 9 41057-0 (12" vinyl single); also features the track "Booty", which is not featured on the album.
2. "Martial Law" – Paisley Park 9 41214-0 and a two disc colored vinyl (red and green) edition with X-rated deep down & dirty and clean mixes-Paisley Park PRO-A-5998

== Personnel ==
- Dallas Austin
- Deborah Barsha
- Steve Boyd
- Daryl Boudreaux
- Greg Boyer
- Jessica Cleaves
- Tommy D. Daugherty
- George Clinton
- Dennis Chambers
- Bootsy Collins
- Phelps Collins
- Gary "Mudbone" Cooper
- Pupa Curly
- Paul Hill
- Lige Curry
- Sandra Dance
- N'Dea Davenport
- Dr. Dre
- Mallia Franklin
- Adrian Goms
- Amp Fiddler
- Flea
- Foley
- Theopolis Glass
- Tasha Griffin
- Joe Harris
- Candace Harrisson
- Sheila Horne
- J.C. 001
- Robert "P-Nut" Johnson
- Louie Kabbabie
- Tracey Lewis
- DeWayne "Blackbyrd" McKnight
- Walter "Junie" Morrison
- Maceo Parker
- Michael "Clip" Payne
- Dean Ragland
- Garry Shider
- David Spradley
- Sonny T
- Fred Wesley
- Jeff Bass
- Mark Bass
- Richard Arrigo
- Aaron Blackmon
- Mark Blistan
- William Bryant
- Kerry Gordy
- Steven Sykes
- Grady Thomas
- Roger Lynch
- Gordon McGuiness
- Bernie Worrell
- William Drayton, Jr. (Flavor Flav)
- Belita Woods
