= Federation of Tackheads =

Studio album by Jimmy G and the Tackheads
- Released: 1985
- Recorded: 1985
- Genre: Funk
- Length: 38:19
- Label: Capitol
- Producer: George Clinton, Steve Washington, DeWayne "Blackbyrd" McKnight, Garry Shider

Federation of Tackheads is an album by the Parliament-Funkadelic spin off act, Jimmy G and the Tackheads. The band was led by George Clinton's younger brother Jimmy Giles and features various musicians and singers from the P-Funk musical collective.

Federation of Tackheads was released in 1985 by Capitol Records. It was produced by Clinton, Steve Washington, DeWayne "Blackbyrd" McKnight and Garry Shider.

In 2004, EMI in the UK reissued the album Federation of Tackheads featuring liner notes written by Rickey Vincent, author of Funk: The Music, The People, and the Rhythm of the One.

== Track listing ==
1. "Break My Heart" (Clinton, Washington, Washington) (released as 12" single Capitol V-15215)
2. "Clockwork" (Johnson, Clinton, Washington)
3. "All Or Nothin'" (Clinton, Washington, Washington)
4. "Lies" (J. Keaton, E. Eatmon) (released as 12" single Capitol V-8648)
5. "Slingshot" (Clinton, Washington, Shider)
6. "I Want Yo Daughter" (Keaton, Rogers, Clinton, Williamson)
7. "Family Funk" (Clinton, Washington, Keaton)

== Personnel ==
- DeWayne "Blackbyrd" McKnight, Steve Washington, Garry Shider, Tony Thomas, Andre Foxxe – guitar
- Jimmy G, Steve Washington – bass
- Dean Ragland – drums
- Steve Washington, Jimmy G and Steve Washington on "Lies" – drum programming
- Steve Washington – keyboards
- Jimmy G, Robert Johnson, George Clinton, Garry Shider, Ron Ford, Sheila Washington, Linda Shider, Sandra Feva, Mallia Franklin, Pat Lewis, Daryl Clinton, Cheryl James, Patty Curry, Lige Curry, Dean Ragland, Joe Harris, Rod Simpson, Kenny Colton – vocals

== Reception ==
Professional ratings
Review scores
Source	Rating
AllMusic	4/5 stars
Robert Christgau	B+

Jimmy Giles and his drummer, Dean Ragland, are the human rhythm section that sparks most of Federation of Tackheads, ... the album's highlight, 'Slingshot', advises dancers to 'get down like James Brown', but the rhythm, an intriguingly phased backbeat pattern, is pure P-funk. 'I Want Your Daughter' is even more striking rhythmically. It lurches along, part shuffle, part march, a bizarrely original groove that should be a challenge to the most resourceful dancers.

— Robert Palmer, The New York Times

'Break My Heart' builds to a clattering, polyrhythmic intensity, one beat constantly cutting across another, as a chanted chorus of "You always break my heart" is sung and shouted at regular intervals ... the music is simple, even crude, but it exerts a mesmerizing fascination – the tiny, often almost imperceptible changes in the basic rhythm (the beat of one drum pushing forward momentarily, a voice scatting improvisationally) keep the music fresh.

— Ken Tucker, The Philadelphia Inquirer
