= (Not Just) Knee Deep =

Single by Funkadelic

from the album Uncle Jam Wants You
- A-side: "(Not Just) Knee Deep - Pt. 1"
- B-side: "(Not Just) Knee Deep - Pt. 2"
- Released: 1979
- Genre: Funk
- Length: 15:21 (album version); 4:25 (7" edit)
- Label: Warner Bros.
- Songwriter: George Clinton
- Producer: George Clinton

Funkadelic singles chronology
"Who Says A Funk Band Can't Play Rock?" (1978)	"(Not Just) Knee Deep" (1979)	"Uncle Jam" (1979)

"(Not Just) Knee Deep" is a song by the American funk band Funkadelic, written by George Clinton. The song was released as a single for their album Uncle Jam Wants You (1979).

The song is widely regarded as a funk classic, peaking at No. 77 on the Billboard Hot 100 and topping the US R&B charts in 1979. An edited version of the song, appearing as Side A on the single release, reached number one on the Billboard Black Singles chart.

== Composition ==
The song was written by George Clinton (credited on some releases as "George Clinton, Jr."); the recording was arranged by Walter "Junie" Morrison and produced by Clinton under the alias "Dr. Funkenstein".

The Funkadelic version is sung by Clinton and several other group members, including Philippé Wynne, who was a former lead singer of the rhythm and blues group, the Spinners, which he left two years earlier.

The lyrics tell of a "girl" who "was a freak of the week" and the man who was dancing with her. He was unimpressed by the Jerk, the Monkey, the Chicken, and the Moose, but was turned on by the Freak.

== Personnel ==
- Lead vocals: George Clinton, Garry Shider, Walter Morrison, Jessica Cleaves, Philippé Wynne
- Lead guitar: Michael Hampton, Walter "Junie" Morrison
- Keyboards/Synth Bass : Walter "Junie" Morrison
- Drums: William "Bootsy" Collins
- Percussion: Larry Fratangelo
- Background vocals: Larry Heckstall, Amuka, Sheila Horne, Ron Ford, Jeanette McGruder, Dawn Silva, Mike Payne, Greg Thomas, Ray Davis, Mallia Franklin, Lige Curry, James Wesley Jackson, Greg Boyer, Jerome Rogers, Linda Shider

== Sampled in other music ==
The song has been heavily sampled by many artists. Hip hop group De La Soul sampled the intro to the song in their hit "Me Myself and I", which reached #34 on the Billboard Pop Charts and #1 on the R&B Charts.

The song was also sampled in LL Cool J's "Nitro", Everlast's "Never Missin A Beat", Tone Lōc's "Funky Cold Medina", MC Hammer & Deion Sanders' "Straight to My Feet", the rap group Mass 187's "Swang Your Hips", Tha Dogg Pound's unreleased track "Can't C Us" (later remixed as 2pac's "Can't C Me"), Geto Boys' "Homie Don't Play That", X Clan's "Funkin' Lesson", Bobby Brown's "Get Away", and Jessie J's "Seal Me with a Kiss".

The Black Eyed Peas also used the beat behind it to remix their hit single "Shut Up", although George Clinton sued the band over copyright infringement, claiming that his signature was forged on the release forms clearing the use of the song.

EPMD sampled it in their song "Gold Digger", and Digital Underground used it in two of their songs, "Kiss You Back"and "Bran Nu Swetta".

In 1997, Vanessa Williams sampled "Knee Deep" for her song "Happiness".

== Appearances in other media ==
- Frequently played by Paul Shaffer and The World's Most Dangerous Band as bumper music on episodes of Late Night with David Letterman (1982–1993). The song was the basis of an extended sketch, aired on 20 October 1983, in which Letterman, Shaffer and Larry "Bud" Melman argued about who played the guitar solo on the original recording. Melman proves that it was Michael "Kidd Funkadelic" Hampton—then robs Dave and Paul at gunpoint.
- Performed by George Clinton and the P-Funk All Stars on the FOX television series New York Undercover in 1995.
- Performed by George Clinton and the P-Funk All Stars on "Late Night with David Letterman" on June 25, 1991.
- Performed by an animated version of George Clinton (played by himself) in The Cleveland Show episode "When a Man (or a Freight Train) Loves His Cookie."
