= By Way of the Drum =

Studio album by Funkadelic
- Released: May 15, 2007
- Recorded: 1989
- Length: 72:38
- Label: Hip-O Select
- Producers: George Clinton, Harry Weinger, Alan Leeds

Funkadelic chronology
Live: Meadowbrook, Rochester, Michigan (1996)	By Way of the Drum (2007)	Toys (2008)

Professional ratings
Review scores
Source	Rating
AllMusic	2/5 stars
Blender	2/5 stars
Chicago Tribune	3.5/4 stars
Goldmine	3/4 stars
The Philadelphia Inquirer	(favorable)

By Way of the Drum is the thirteenth studio album by the American funk rock band Funkadelic, shelved in 1989 by MCA Records, and eventually released in 2007 on Hip-O Select. It was producer and band leader George Clinton's first project after signing to MCA in 1988,while he was struggling with the aftermath of a string of unfortunate business deals and lawsuits that had derailed his p-funk troupe's touring and recording enterprise. He was able to record and fiish the album with several loyal musicians and new protégés, but only a single of the title track was released in 1989 (MCA 23953)—with overdubs that angered Clinton—before MCA lost patience with Clinton and his "so-called concept group". After the contract was aborted, the Cream cover "Sunshine of Your Love" surfaced on the 1992 compilation Go Fer Yer Funk, and "Nose Bleed" was integrated into the 1994 "Dope Dogs" album. The original tapes were assumed to be lost, but eventually resurfaced and were released with Harry Weinger and Alan Leeds serving as compilation producers.

== Track listing ==
No.	Title	Writer(s)	Length
1.	"Nose Bleed"	George Clinton, DeWayne "Blackbyrd" McKnight	5:44
2.	"Sunshine of Your Love"	Jack Bruce, Pete Brown, Eric Clapton	5:25
3.	"Freaks Bearing Gifts"	David Spradley, Clinton, Garry Shider	6:01
4.	"YaDaDaDa"	Willie Collins, Tracey Lewis	5:06
5.	"By Way of the Drum"	Spradley, Clinton, Shider	5:59
6.	"Jugular"	McKnight (a.k.a. "Juggler")	5:57
7.	"Some Fresh Delic"	Clinton, McKnight, Eddie Hazel	5:24
8.	"Primal Instinct"	Deborah Barsha, Clinton, Loic Gambas, Diem Jones	4:52
Total length:			44:28

Bonus tracks
No.	Title	Writer(s)	Length
1.	"By Way of the Drum (Extended Version)"	Spradley, Clinton, Shider	9:16
2.	"By Way of the Drum (Dub)"	Spradley, Clinton, Shider	6:54
3.	"By Way of the Drum (Basstrumental)"	Spradley, Clinton, Shider	6:10
4.	"By Way of the Drum (Acappella)"	Spradley, Clinton, Shider	5:50
Total length:			28:10 72:38

== Personnel ==
- George Clinton
- DeWayne "Blackbyrd" McKnight
- Eddie Hazel
- Frank Colon
- David Spradley
- Donnie Sterling
- Loic Gambas
- Garry Shider
- Amp Fiddler
- Mallia Franklin
- Willie Collins
- Tracey Lewis
- Paul Hill
- Deborah Barsha
- Diem Jones
