= Some of My Best Jokes Are Friends =

Studio album by George Clinton
- Released: 1985
- Recorded: 1984–1985
- Genres: R&B, funk, dance
- Length: 39:34
- Label: Capitol
- Producers: George Clinton, Garry Shider, Steve Washington, Bootsy Collins, Tracey Lewis, Doug Wimbish, Thomas Dolby

George Clinton chronology
You Shouldn't-Nuf Bit Fish (1983)	Some of My Best Jokes Are Friends (1985)	R&B Skeletons in the Closet (1986)

Professional ratings
Review scores
Source	Rating
Allmusic	2.5/5 stars
Los Angeles Times	(favorable)
New York Times	(favorable)
NME	(favorable)
Rolling Stone	(favorable)
Trouser Press	(favorable)
Virgin Encyclopedia	4/5 stars
Washington Post	(favorable)
Yahoo! Music	(mixed)
The Village Voice	A−

Some of My Best Jokes Are Friends is the third studio album by George Clinton. It was released in 1985 by Capitol Records. Though it wasn't as successful as Computer Games, Clinton's first solo album, Some of My Best Jokes Are Friends received favorable reviews among critics. While many former P-Funk musicians are featured on the album, it also features collaborations with more contemporary performers such as Doug Wimbish, Steve Washington, and keyboardist Thomas Dolby.

Some of My Best Jokes Are Friends employs various producers from the P-Funk musical collective, including Clinton, Garry Shider, Washington, Bootsy Collins, Junie Morrison, Clinton's son Tracy Lewis, Wimbish, and Dolby.

== Track listing ==
Side one
No.	Title	Writer(s)	Length
1.	"Double Oh-Oh" (released as a single-Capitol B-5473 and as a 12" single-Capitol V-8642)	Garry Shider, George Clinton, St. Song	5:46
2.	"Bullet Proof" (released as a single-Capitol 5504 and as a 12" single-Capitol V-8653)	G. Clinton, St. Song	6:19
3.	"Pleasures Of Exhaustion (Do It Till I Drop)"	G. Clinton, Steve Washington	7:07
Total length:			19:12

Side two
No.	Title	Writer(s)	Length
1.	"Bodyguard"	G. Clinton, Walter Morrison, Bootsy Collins	3:49
2.	"Bangladesh"	Tracey Lewis	4:55
3.	"Thrashin'"	Rodney Curtis, Shawn Clinton, Shider	5:37
4.	"Some of My Best Jokes Are Friends"	G. Clinton, Doug Wimbish, Bernard Alexander	6:01
Total length:			20:22 39:34

== Personnel ==
- Lead vocals: George Clinton and Thomas Dolby
- Almost lead vocals: Garry Shider, Sandra Feva, Joe Harris
- Background vocals: Pat Lewis, Sandra Feva, Jimmy G, Tracey Lewis, Andre Foxxe, Garry Shider, Linda Shider, Robert Johnson, Michael Payne, Jerome Rogers, Lige Curry, Patti Curry, DeWayne McKnight, Steve Washington, Sheila Washington, Debbie Wright, Faye Cavendar, Shirley Hayden, Mallia Franklin, Gary Cooper, Bootsy Collins, Louie Kababbie, Rod Simpson, Ron Ford, Jeanette McGruder, Jim Wright, Shawn Clinton, Daryl Clinton, James Wilkerson, Beverly Wilson,
- Guitars: DeWayne "Blackbyrd" McKnight, Michael Hampton, Andre Foxxe, Tony Hooks, Bootsy Collins, Eddie Hazel, Garry Shider, Bernard Alexander, Steve Washington, Stew Simon
- Real bass: Rodney Curtis, Doug Wimbish, Steve Washington
- Electric bass chips: Bootsy Collins, Doug Wimbish, David Spradley, Steve Washington
- Keyboards: Thomas Dolby, Junie Morrison, Bootsy Collins, Tracey Lewis, Doug Wimbush, Eric White, Steve Washington, David Spradley
- Fairlight and assorted keyboard chips: Thomas Dolby
- Real drums as in traps: Dennis Chambers, Bootsy Collins
- Electric drum chips: Bootsy Collins, Tracey Lewis, Bernard Alexander, David Spradley
- Sequential circuits and linn drums: Steve Washington
- Percussion: Muruga Booker, Bootsy Collins, Larry Fratangelo
- Strings: Bob Basso, David Everheart, Manny Capote, Lorraine Basso, Bogden Chrusey, Gary Wedder, Stu McDonald
- Horns: Maceo Parker, Greg Boyer, Greg Thomas, Benny Cowan, Eric White, Ken Faulk, Ed Calle
- Flute solo on "Pleasures Of Exhaustion (Do It Till I Drop)": Mike Fleming
- Saxophone solo on "Bangladesh": Ed Calle
- Air Raid Siren guitar synth on "Bulletproof":Stew Simon
