= The Best of the Early Years, Vol. 1 =

The Best of the Early Years, Volume 1

Compilation album by Funkadelic
- Released: 1977
- Recorded: 1977 at United Sound Studio,
- Genre: Funk
- Length: 43:00
- Label: Westbound
- Producer: George Clinton

Funkadelic chronology
| Hardcore Jollies | The Best of the Early Years, Volume 1 (1977) | One Nation Under A Groove (1978) |

The Best of the Early Years, Volume 1 is a compilation album by the American Funk band Funkadelic. It was released on Westbound in 1977 while the label was distributed by Atlantic Records. The Best of the Early Years, Volume One compiles material from Funkadelic's tenure at Westbound from 1969 to 1974.

The Best of the Early Years, Volume 1 differs from the previous greatest hits compilation released by the label in the 1975 in that it features tracks that were not released as singles. Similar to the 1975 compilation, The Best of the Early Years, Volume 1 has never been issued on CD, due to the fact that Westbound has released several compilations that were more comprehensive. It also consists strictly of album tracks, not edited single versions.

The Best of the Early Years, Volume 1 is the second P-Funk related release to feature artwork from illustrator Ronald "Stozo" Edwards.

== Reception ==
AllMusic described the album as "better than the previous Westbound compilation," rating it four and a half stars.

== Tracks ==
Side one

1. Cosmic Slop (George Clinton, Bernie Worrell)
2. Sexy Ways (Clinton, Grace Cook)
3. Super Stupid (Eddie Hazel, Billy Nelson, Tawl Ross, Clinton)
4. No Compute (Clinton, Garry Shider)
5. Can't Stand The Strain (Clinton, Hazel)

Side two

1. Wake Up (Clinton, Bernie Worrell, James Wesley Jackson)
2. Philmore (William Collins)
3. Funky Dollar Bill (Clinton, Hazel, Ray Davis)
4. Can You Get To That (Clinton, Ernest Harris)
5. I'll Bet You (Clinton, Theresa Lindsay, Sidney Barnes)

== Personnel ==
For this particular compilation, Funkadelic consisted of:

Bernie Worrell, Bootsy Collins, Garry Shider, Eddie Hazel, Tiki Fulwood, Billy Bass Nelson, Ron Bykowski, Cordell Mosson, Glenn Goins, Prakash John, Tyrone Lampkin, Harold Beane, and Tawl Ross. Vocal support was provided by the five members of the Parliaments: George Clinton, Fuzzy Haskins, Grady Thomas, Calvin Simon, and Ray Davis.
