= Heavy Metal Funkason =

Studio album by Michael Hampton
- Released: 1998
- Recorded: 1998
- Genre: Funk metal
- Length: 69:58
- Label: P-Vine
- Producer: Michael Hampton; Lige Curry (co-producer)

Heavy Metal Funkason is the first full-fledged solo album by Parliament-Funkadelic guitarist Michael Hampton. It was released through the P-Vine label in Japan on March 31, 1998. The album features appearances by George Clinton, P-Funk bassist Lige Curry (Hampton's cousin), Belita Woods, and Charlie Wilson from the Gap Band.

Prior to this release, Michael Hampton released an album of sample tracks for D.J.'s entitled "P-Funk Guitar Riffs For D.J.'s" (Tuff City TUF LP 0627) in 1995.

== Track listing ==
1. "A cappella Unsung Love Song"
2. "Sloppy Metal (Unsung Love Song)"
3. "Me Anti?"
4. "Tryin' To Get Out of This Alive"
5. "Heavy Metal Funkadelic"
6. "Comebacksly"
7. "Club Metalfunkadelamack"
8. "Cracked Up Soldier"
9. "Wrongsidius"
10. "Chronic Reggae"
11. "Time To Get Up"
12. "Duh Kidd Funkadelic Anthem"
13. "Backindadaze"
14. "Girlz of Duh World"
15. "A cappella Unsung Love Song (Sloppy Metal)"

== Personnel ==
- Michael Hampton – lead and rhythm guitars, bass, keyboards; bass synth on "Comebacksly" and "Duh Kidd Funkadelic Anthem"; bass synth, background and sampled vocals on "Girlz of Duh World".
- Lige Curry – bass guitar, lead and background vocals on "Girlz of Duh World"; producer of initiative
- Roger Parker – drums
- George Clinton – lead and background vocals and vocal arrangements on "Sloppy Metal (Unsung Love Song)"; lead vocals on "A cappella Unsung Love Song (Sloppy Metal)"; background vocals on "Comebacksly"
- Charlie Wilson – lead and background vocals and solo keyboards on "Comebacksly"; background vocals on "Sloppy Metal (Unsung Love Song)"
- Belita Woods – lead and background vocals on "Comebacksly"
