= George Clinton Presents Our Gang Funky =

Studio album by Various artists
- Released: October 2, 1989
- Recorded: 1988–89
- Genre: Funk
- Length: 38:31
- Label: MCA Records
- Producer: George Clinton, Garry Shider, Mark Davis

George Clinton Presents Our Gang Funky a various artists CD compilation released in 1989. The album was released by MCA Records in the U.S., and showcases various newly developed performers coming out of the P-Funk stable at the end of the eighties. The album was produced by George Clinton, Garry Shider, and Mark Davis.

== Tracks ==
1. Beautiful (Bootsy Collins, Mico Wave, Linda Shider) 5:50 (released as a 12" single-MCA-23872)
2. Nice (G Clinton, David Spradley) 6:48
3. Manopener (G Clinton, W Collins, Joe Harris) 6:32
4. Hooray (G Clinton, D Spradley) 7:47
5. He Dance Funny (G Clinton, W Collins, Wes Boatman) 5:59
6. I Want Your Car (Mark Davis, M Sands) 5:29

== Personnel ==
- Playground Screamers (Vocalists): Belita Woods, Pat "Patty Poo" Lewis, Joe Harris, Andre Foxx Williams, Yosefa Bari, Michelle Hill, Robert Johnson, Phaedra Harris, Pennye Ford, Jessica Cleaves, Linda Williams, Stefan Frank, George Clinton, Virginia Watson
- Note Stumpers (Musicians): Tracy Roberson, Sandra Feva, Michael Payne, Lloyd Williams, Gary Shider
- Keyboards/Drum Machines: Amp Fiddler, Michael Lane, Mark Davis
- Guitar: Garry Shider, DeWayne McKnight, Bootsy Collins, Christopher Bruce
- Bass: Bootsy Collins
