= Uncle Jam Wants You =

Studio album by Funkadelic
- Released: September 21, 1979
- Studios: United Sound Systems, Detroit, Michigan
- Genres: Funk; disco; R&B; pop
- Length: 41:43
- Label: Warner Bros.
- Producer: George Clinton

Funkadelic chronology
One Nation Under a Groove (1978)	Uncle Jam Wants You (1979)	Connections & Disconnections (1980)

Singles from Uncle Jam Wants You
- 1. "(Not Just) Knee Deep" Released: August 21, 1979; 2. "Uncle Jam" Released: 1979

Uncle Jam Wants You is the eleventh studio album by American funk rock band Funkadelic. It was released by Warner Bros. Records on September 21, 1979, and was later reissued on CD by Priority Records. It was produced by George Clinton under the alias Dr. Funkenstein. It is the first Funkadelic album since America Eats Its Young in 1972 not to sport a cover illustrated by Funkadelic artist Pedro Bell, though Bell did provide artwork for the album’s back cover and interior. Uncle Jam Wants You was the second Funkadelic album to be certified gold. The album peaked at No. 18 on the Billboard 200 and No. 2 on the Billboard Top R&B/Hip-Hop Albums chart.

== Significance ==
Uncle Jam Wants You (a reference to the "Uncle Sam wants you!" US Army recruitment posters) may be a more militant sequel to the band's previous album, One Nation Under a Groove, with the band waging war against the rise of disco. Its purpose is also (as the cover claims) to "rescue dance music from the blahs."

The cover art depicts George Clinton in a Huey Newton-Black Panthers pose. The album features the band's last big hit single, "(Not Just) Knee Deep", an edited version of which went to number one on the Billboard Soul singles charts. The album title was adopted by the DJ organization known as Uncle Jamm's Army.

Samples of the 15-minute cut "(Not Just) Knee Deep" can be heard on Digital Underground's "Kiss You Back"; the track has also been used by De La Soul for their song "Me Myself and I".

== Reception ==
Professional ratings
Review scores
Source	Rating
AllMusic	4.5/5 stars
Bay State Banner	C+
Blender	3/5 stars
Christgau's Record Guide	B+
MusicHound Rock: The Essential Album Guide	4/5 stars
Record Mirror	4/5 stars
(The New) Rolling Stone Album Guide	4/5 stars
Spin Alternative Record Guide	5/10
The Virgin Encyclopedia of R&B and Soul	3/5 stars

With a 4 out of 5 star rating, Paul Sexton of Record Mirror wrote: "Last year the Funkadelic battle campaign was based on the idea of having one nation under a groove. This year the plan is to Rescue Dance Music from the Blahs. No, I don't understand either, but once again this is marvellously enjoyable comic book funk." The Bay State Banner concluded that, "on Side Two and 'Freak of the Week', we find the sort of directionless noise that sometimes ruins Funkadelic concerts—rhythmic anarchy and vocal chipmunk-ism instead of the clean and nasty, low-register funk and howling, inconsolable guitar solos." The Globe and Mail determined that "the cover is misleading; one expects a record jammed with disco tracks and instead receives sensitive, even contemplative rhythm and blues."

The New York Times noted that "Holly Wants to Go to California" "is the sort of social satire that Frank Zappa and the Mothers used to do so well." Rolling Stone opined that "the strongest material here—notably the first ten minutes or so of '(Not Just) Knee Deep', with its snazzy synthesizer fills, razor-sharp Michael Hampton guitar solo, raucous vocals, and hook upon hook—is state-of-the-art black pop music."

Ned Raggett of AllMusic stated that the album starts "out like a parody of patriotic recruitment ads before hitting its full, funky stride... It's still very much a disco effort, but one overtly spiking the brew even more than before with P-Funk's own particular recipe, mock drill instructors calling out dance commands and so forth."

== Track listing ==
Side one

1. "Freak of the Week" (George Clinton, Jr., Pete Bishop, DeWayne McKnight) – 5:34
2. "(Not Just) Knee Deep" (G. Clinton, Jr.) – 15:23 (released as two-part single WBS 49040)

Side two

1. "Uncle Jam" (G. Clinton, Jr., Garry Shider, Bernie Worrell, Bootsy Collins) – 10:26 (released as two-part single WB 49117)
2. "Field Maneuvers" (Darryll Clinton, Donna Lynn Clinton) – 2:25
3. "Holly Wants to Go to California" (G. Clinton, Jr., Worrell) – 4:24
4. "Foot Soldiers (Star-Spangled Funky)" (G. Clinton., Jr., Jim Vitti) – 3:31

== Personnel ==
Funkadelic Rescue Dance Band (as given in the liner notes)

- Axe Force: Fret Commanders Michael "Kidd Funkadelic" Hampton, Gary "DooWop" Shider, Eddie "Maggot Brain" Hazel
- Keyboard Battlecruisers: Bernie (U.S.S. Woo!) Worrell, J.S. Theracon
- Uncle Jam's Drums and Percussion: Tyrone "Speedfeet" Lampkin, Larry Fratangelo
- Bass Anti-Flam Units: Rodney "Skeet" Curtis, Cordell "Boogie" Mosson
- Uncle Jam's Drumset, and funky beatz: Dennis Chambers
- Vocal Assault & Funkatition Team: Uncle Jam Clinton, Gary "DooWop" Shider, Larry "Sir Nose" Heckstall, Sheila Horn, Ron "Prophet" Ford, Jeanette McGruder, Dawn Silva, Michael "Clip" Payne, Greg Thomas, Ray "Stingray" Davis

Additional musicians

- Guitars: William Collins, Dewayne McKnight, Glenn Goins
- Bass: Billy Bass Nelson, William Collins, Jeff Bunn
- Keyboards: Junie Morrison, Gary Hudgins, Gerome Rogers
- Drums: Tiki Fulwood, William Collins, Dennis Chambers, Jerome Brailey
- Background vocals: Linda Brown, Jessica Cleaves, Mallia Franklin, Philippe Wynne, Lige Curry, James Wesley, Greg Boyer, Gerome Rogers

Photography

- Diem Jones
