= Dope Dogs =

Studio album by Parliament-Funkadelic
- Released: November 25, 1994 (Japan); 1995 (U.S.)
- Recorded: 1994
- Genres: Funk; hip hop; R&B
- Length: 75:23 (US issue)
- Labels: P-Vine; Hot Hands; Dogone Records
- Producer: George Clinton

Parliament-Funkadelic chronology
Urban Dancefloor Guerillas (1983)	Dope Dogs (1994)	T.A.P.O.A.F.O.M. (1996)

Dope Dogs is a 1994 album by Parliament-Funkadelic (also known as P-Funk All Stars). The album was first released on the P-Vine label in Japan. It was later released on the Hot Hands label in the United Kingdom. The United States release on the Dogone Records label, a custom label of Available Entertainment, was released under the name George Clinton and the P-Funk All-Stars. The U.S. version was remastered by David Libert of Available Entertainment. The album's theme deals with dope-sniffing dogs that become addicted to the very drugs that they are assigned to find.

== Reception ==
Professional ratings
Review scores
Source	Rating
AllMusic	3.5/5 stars
The Boston Globe	(favorable)
Entertainment Weekly	A−
The Independent	(favorable)
Q	4/5 stars
Rolling Stone	4/5 stars
Select	3/5 medals
The Village Voice	A
The Washington Post	(favorable)

Select gave the album a rating of three out of five, stating that there are "moves and grooves aplenty, but most of it leads nowhere"

== Tracks ==
The album's configuration varied among the American, Japanese, British and releases.

=== American track listing ===
No.	Title	Writer(s)	Length
1.	"Dog Star (Fly On)"	George Clinton, DeWayne McKnight	8:11
2.	"U.S. Custom Coast Guard Dope Dog"	G. Clinton	5:15
3.	"Some Next Shit"	G. Clinton, Michael Payne	6:10
4.	"Just Say Ding (Databoy)"	G. Clinton, Tracey Lewis, McKnight	4:33
5.	"Help Scottie, Help (I'm Tweaking and I Can't Beam Up)"	T. Lewis, Hazel Lewis	5:06
6.	"Pepe (The Pill Popper)"	G. Clinton	6:08
7.	"Back Against The Wall"	G. Clinton, McKnight	5:51
8.	"Fifi"	G. Clinton, McKnight	3:58
9.	"All Sons of Bitches"	G. Clinton, Belita Woods	4:33
10.	"Sick 'Em (Instrumental)"	G. Clinton	5:14
11.	"I Ain't the Lady (He Ain't the Tramp)"	G. Clinton, Loic Gambas Bordas, Eebony Young	4:38
12.	"Pack of Wild Dogs"	G. Clinton, Andre Williams, Mike E. Clark	5:47
13.	"Tales That Wag the Dog"	G. Clinton, T. Lewis, Derrick Rossen	5:30
14.	"My Dog"	G. Clinton, "Crop" Holyfield	4:29
Total length:			75:23

=== Japanese track listing ===
No.	Title	Writer(s)	Length
1.	"Dog Star (Fly On)"	George Clinton, DeWayne McKnight	8:11
2.	"U.S. Custom Coast Guard Dog"	G. Clinton	4:53
3.	"Some Next Shit"	G. Clinton, Michael Payne	6:11
4.	"Follow the Leader"	Rakim, G. Clinton	5:30
5.	"Just Say Ding (Databoy)"	G. Clinton, Tracey Lewis, McKnight	4:33
6.	"Help Scottie, Help (I'm Tweaking and I Can't Beam Up)"	T. Lewis, Hazel Lewis	5:04
7.	"Pack of Wild Dogs"	G. Clinton, Andre Williams, Mike E. Clark	5:47
8.	"Fifi"	G. Clinton, McKnight	3:46
9.	"All Sons of Bitches"	G. Clinton, Belita Woods	5:34
10.	"Dopey Dope Dog"	G. Clinton, Daddy Freddy, Lige Curry	4:53
11.	"Sick 'Em"	G. Clinton	6:13
12.	"Kibbles and Bits"	G. Clinton	5:05
13.	"I Ain't the Lady (He Ain't the Tramp)"	G. Clinton, Loic Gambas Bordas, Eebony Young	4:38
14.	"Tales That Wag the Dog Part 1 (Nigga, Pleeeeeze!)"	G. Clinton, T. Lewis, Derrick Rossen	5:30
15.	"Tales That Wag the Dog Part 2 (Is That Your Bark or Your Bite?)"	G. Clinton, T. Lewis, Rossen

=== British track listing ===
No.	Title	Writer(s)	Length
1.	"Dog Star (Fly On)"	George Clinton, DeWayne McKnight	8:11
2.	"Fifi"	G. Clinton, McKnight	3:46
3.	"Some Next Shit"	G. Clinton, Michael Payne	6:11
4.	"Follow the Leader"	Rakim, G. Clinton	5:30
5.	"Just Say Ding (Databoy)"	G. Clinton, Tracey Lewis, McKnight	4:33
6.	"Help Scottie, Help (I'm Tweaking and I Can't Beam Up)"	T. Lewis, Hazel Lewis	5:04
7.	"Lost Dog"	G. Clinton, Bobby Gillespie
8.	"A U.S. Customs Coast Guard Dope Dog (Hyper Mix)"	G. Clinton, Gillespie	4:53
9.	"All Sons of Bitches"	G. Clinton, Belita Woods	5:34
10.	"Dopey Dope Dog"	G. Clinton, Daddy Freddy, Lige Curry	4:53
11.	"Sick 'Em"	G. Clinton	6:13
12.	"Gettin' Dogged"	G Clinton, Robert Johnson Jr., Payne
13.	"I Ain't the Lady (He Ain't the Tramp)"	G. Clinton, Loic Gambas Bordas, Eebony Young	4:38
14.	"Tales That Wag the Dog Part 1 (Nigga, Pleeeeeze!)"	G. Clinton, T. Lewis, Derrick Rossen	5:30
15.	"Tales That Wag the Dog Part 2 (Is That Your Bark or Your Bite?)"	G. Clinton, T. Lewis, Rossen

== Personnel ==
- Vocals: Pat Lewis, Sandra Feva, Sheila Horne, Steve Boyd, Robert "P-Nut" Johnson, Lige Curry, Belita Woods, Joe Harris, Michael "Clip" Payne, Gary "Mudbone" Cooper, Lloyd Williams, Garry Shider, Amelia Jesse, Andre Foxxe Williams, Paul Hill, Louie "Babblin" Kabbabie, Clarence "Fuzzy" Haskins, Calvin Simon, Ray Davis, Grady Thomas, Nicole Tindall, Jeanette McGruder, Shirley Hayden, Jessica Cleaves, Janet Evans, Larry Heckstall, Duane, "Sa'D'Ali" Maultsby, Starr Cullars, Shawn Clinton, George Clinton, FROG, Patavian Lewis, Trafael, Tracey Lewis, "Cuz", Barbarella Bishop, Daddy Freddy
- Guitars: Eddie Hazel, Michael Hampton, Garry Shider, DeWayne "Blackbyrd" McKnight, Andre Foxxe Williams, Cordell Mosson, Michael "Clip" Payne, Bootsy Collins, Phelps "Catfish" Collins, Jerome Ali, Jeff Bass, Loic Gambas
- Bass: Lige Curry, Dewayne "Blackbyrd" McKnight, Lonnie Motley, Mike "Clip" Payne, and Bootsy Collins
- Drummers and Percussionists: Frankie "Kash" Waddy, Guy Curtis, Dewayne "Blackbyrd" McKnight, Gabe Gonzales, Michael "Clip" Payne, Loic Gambas, Man In The Box, Muruga Booker
- Keyboards and Piano: Joseph "Amp" Fiddler, Tracey Lewis
- Organs and Synthesizers: Bernie Worrell, Michael "Clip" Payne, George Clinton, Dewayne "Blackbyrd" McKnight, Jeff Bass, and Loic Gambas
- Horns: Fred Wesley, Maceo Parker, Richard Griffith, Rick Gardner, Marcus Belgrave, Bennie Cowan, Greg Thomas, Greg Boyer, Perry Robinson
- Programmers and Re-mixers: Michael "Clip" Payne, Mike E. Clark, Mike Wilder, Mark Bass, George Clinton
