= Toys (Funkadelic album) =

Compilation album by Funkadelic
- Released: 2008
- Recorded: 1970–1974
- Genre: Psychedelic funk
- Length: 54:27
- Label: Westbound Records
- Producer: Original sessions produced by George Clinton

Funkadelic chronology
By Way of the Drum (2007)	Toys (2008)	U.S. Music with Funkadelic (2009)

Professional ratings
Review scores
Source	Rating
AllMusic	3/5 stars

Toys is a compilation consisting of unreleased music by American funk rock band Funkadelic. It was released by Westbound Records in 2008 and consists of previously unreleased sessions recorded during the band's tenure for Westbound. The album was originally scheduled to be released in 2002, but was delayed numerous times, presumably due to legal issues. The CD also features a video clip of the song "Cosmic Slop", which can only be viewed on a PC.

== Track listing ==
No.	Title	Writer(s)	Length
1.	"Heart Trouble a.k.a. You Can't Miss What You Can't Measure"	Sidney Barnes, George Clinton	4:33
2.	"The Goose That Laid The Golden Egg"	Clinton, Eddie Hazel	5:37
3.	"Vampy Funky Bernie (3rd Tune Olympic)"	William Nelson, Clarence Haskins, Ray Davis, Robert Roberts	6:33
4.	"Talk About Jesus"	Bernard Worrell	5:50
5.	"Slide On In (2nd Olympic Tune)"	Nelson, Haskins, Davis, Roberts	10:47
6.	"Stink Finger"	Nelson, Haskins, Davis, Roberts	3:18
7.	"Magnififunk"	Nelson, Haskins, Davis, Roberts	6:05
8.	"Wars Of Armegeddon" (Karaoke Version)	Worrell, Clinton, Tawl Ross, Tiki Fulwood	6:04
9.	"2 Dollars & 2 Dimes"	Nelson, Haskins, Davis, Roberts	2:00
10.	"Cosmic Slop"	Worrell, Clinton	3:40
Total length:			54:27

== Personnel ==
- Guitars – Eddie Hazel, Tawl Ross
- Bass – Billy Bass Nelson
- Drums – Tiki Fulwood, Brad Ennis on Talk about Jesus
- Keyboards – Bernie Worrell
- Vocals – George Clinton, Fuzzy Haskins, Calvin Simon, Grady Thomas, Ray Davis, Rose Williams, Pat Lewis, Diane Lewis, Telma Hopkins, Eddie Hazel, Billy Bass Nelson
