= One Nation Under a Groove (song) =

1978 single by American band Funkadelic

- US picture sleeve

Single by Funkadelic

from the album One Nation Under a Groove
- B-side: "One Nation Under a Groove" (part two)
- Released: September 1978
- Recorded: 1978
- Genre: Funk
- Length: 7:33 (album version); 4:12 (single version); 11:26 (12″ version)
- Label: Warner Bros.
- Songwriters: George Clinton; Walter Morrison; Garry Shider
- Producer: George Clinton

Funkadelic singles chronology
"Smokey" (1977)	"One Nation Under a Groove" (1978)	"Cholly (Funk Getting Ready to Roll!)" (1979)

Audio
- "One Nation Under a Groove" (album version) by Funkadelic on YouTube

"One Nation Under a Groove" is a song by American funk rock band Funkadelic and the title track from their tenth studio album of the same name (1978). It was released in September 1978 by Warner Bros. as the first single from the album and was written by George Clinton, Walter Morrison and Garry Shider, while Clinton produced it. The song has endured as a dance funk classic and is one of Funkadelic's most well known songs. "One Nation Under a Groove" was also Funkadelic's first million selling single, as well as the third million selling single for the P-Funk organization overall. In 2022, Rolling Stone ranked it among the "200 Greatest Dance Songs of All Time".

== Background ==
Compared to Funkadelic's earlier output, which was characterized by sound typical for rock music, this song has sound more typical for dance music. The lyrics refer to dancing as a way to freedom. The song opens with the lyrics "So wide, you can't get around it/ So low, you can't get under it/ So high you can't get over it." Though it is not stated where these lyrics originate, it is quite likely that they come from the traditional gospel song "So High", itself having been previously referenced in the Temptations' song "Psychedelic Shack".

According to Tom Vickers, who served as Minister of Information for Parliament-Funkadelic from 1976 to 1980, during an impromptu performance in front of the United Nations, a woman who accompanied George Clinton to the event witnessed a U.N. worker hoisting the flags in front of the building. When Clinton asked the woman what she thought, she replied, "One Nation Under a Groove".

== Chart performance ==
"One Nation Under a Groove" was released as a single and peaked at number twenty-eight on the US Billboard Hot 100 and reached number one on the Billboard Soul chart for six weeks, the longest of any number one single released in 1978. On other US charts, it reached thirty-one on the Billboard Club Play Singles chart. Outside the US, "One Nation Under a Groove" reached the top ten in the UK Singles Charts attaining a peak of number nine in January 1979. It is the band's only UK hit. In Canada, the song reached number 71 in the Top 100 and number five on the Dance charts.

== Accolades ==
The song is included in the Rock and Roll Hall of Fame's list of 500 Songs That Shaped Rock and Roll. It is also ranked number 474 on the Rolling Stone magazine's list of "the 500 Greatest Songs of All Time". It was dropped in the 2010 version but it has been updated to number 210 in the 2021 version. In 2019, NME ranked "One Nation Under a Groove" among "The 20 Best Disco Songs of All Time". In July 2022, Rolling Stone ranked it number 178 in their "200 Greatest Dance Songs of All Time" list.

== Charts ==
Chart (1978–1979)	Peak position
Canada Top Singles (RPM)	71
Canada Disco 30	5
UK Singles (Official Charts)	9
US Billboard Hot 100	28
US Dance Club Songs (Billboard)	31
US Hot R&B/Hip-Hop Songs (Billboard)	1

== Cover versions & legacy ==
- The Style Council covered the song in concert during the 1980s, incorporating some of its lyrics into their instrumental song "Dropping Bombs on the White House", originally released in its studio form on their album Café Bleu in 1984. A live recording was later released on their 1998 live album The Style Council in Concert.
- Devon Irons made a reggae cover in 1980 called "One Nation".
- Polish musician Kazik sampled the song on his track 12 Groszy.
- Rapper Ice Cube samples the song on his track "Bop Gun (One Nation)" from his 1993 album Lethal Injection.
- The track "Young Nation" from Aaliyah's debut album Age Ain't Nothing but a Number lyrically references the song and interpolates its chorus.
