= Live... And Kickin' =

Live...And Kickin'

Live album by George Clinton & the P-Funk All-Stars
- Released: September 1997
- Recorded: 1978–1997
- Genre: Funk
- Label: Intersound
- Producer: George Clinton

George Clinton & the P-Funk All-Stars chronology
T.A.P.O.A.F.O.M. (1996)	Live...And Kickin' (1997)	How Late Do U Have 2BB4UR Absent? (2005)

Live... And Kickin' is a 1997 live album by George Clinton and the P-Funk All-Stars. The album was released by the Intersound Label in the U.S. and by Victor Entertainment Inc. in Japan. The release is a double CD set containing tracks recorded during various P-Funk tours dating back to 1978, as well as three studio tracks including a collaboration with the Dazz Band. The Japanese version of Live... And Kickin' was scaled back to a single CD release.

== Track listing ==
CD-1

1. Cosmic Slop (7:39)
2. Bop Gun (6:28)
3. Standing on the Verge (9:07)
4. Funk Gettin' Ready to Roll (3:59)
5. Funkentelechy (Where'd You Get That Funk From) (24:14)
6. Give Up the Funk (Tear the Roof off the Sucker) (9:42)
7. Let's Take It to the Stage (5:18)
8. Good Love (Instrumental) (5:57)

CD-2

1. Maggot Brain (8:26)
2. Make My Funk the P-Funk (12:27)
3. Flash Light (7:14)
4. Aqua Boogie (6:19)
5. Atomic Dog (8:28)
6. Mothership Connection (Star Child) (16:44)
7. Pepe the Pill Popper (3:39)
8. Let's Get Satisfied / Dope Dog (3:52)
9. Ain't Nuthin' But a Jam Y'All (4:01)
10. State of the Nation (5:23)
