= Andre Foxxe =

- Birth name: Andre Williams
- Genres: Funk, Soul, R&B
- Occupation(s): Singer-songwriter, guitarist
- Website: www.andrefoxxe.com

Andre "Foxxe" Williams is an American singer, guitarist, songwriter, bandleader, and music producer. He was a long-standing member of the band Parliament-Funkadelic and was known for wearing a wedding dress while performing with them live. Andre Foxxe has also performed and recorded with the likes of Red Hot Chili Peppers, Macy Gray, Tony Allen, and Amp Fiddler among others. Andre Foxxe currently lead the band Andre Foxxe & The Psychedelic Ghetto Pimpz out of Detroit, MI.

== Solo Discography ==
Year	Album information
1994	"I'm Funk And I'm Proud": Label: P-Vine Records
2001	"The Foxxe Files: A Dossier On Sex & Animals": Label: Wefunk AD2k Recordings & Filmworks
2002	"Myllenium": Label: Raw Funk Records
2015	"Andre Foxxe & The Psychedelic Ghetto Pimpz": Label: Foxxeman Productions

== See also ==
- List of P-Funk members
- List of P-Funk projects
- Category:P-Funk songs
- Parliament discography
- Funkadelic discography
- P-Funk mythology
