= Godmoma =

Musical group

- Genre: Funk
- Years active: 1980–1981
- Label: Elektra Records
- Past members: Cynthia Girty; Carolyn Myles; Tony Walker

Godmoma was a trio of female vocalists. The trio consisted of Cynthia Girty, Carolyn Myles, and Tony Walker.

Godmoma released one album, Godmoma Here, in 1981, on Elektra Records. Godmoma Here was produced by P-Funk bassist Bootsy Collins and included musical contributions by Sly Stone, Fred Wesley, Maceo Parker, and Catfish Collins, among others.

In 1980, Godmoma performed vocals on Collins' Ultra Wave album. They have contributed to some of his other albums, including The One Giveth, the Count Taketh Away (1982), What's Bootsy Doin'? (1988), and Blasters of the Universe (1994).

As individuals, the members of Godmoma have worked with artists such as Bobby Womack and David Ruffin.

== See also ==
- P-Funk members
- List of P-Funk projects
