= One Nation Under a Groove =

Studio album by Funkadelic
- Released: September 22, 1978
- Recorded: 1977–1978
- Studios: United Sound (Detroit, Michigan); Monroe Civic Center (Monroe, Louisiana)
- Genres: Funk; rock; R&B; black rock
- Length: 42:10 (original album); 17:26 (bonus EP); 59:36 (total)
- Label: Warner Bros.
- Producer: George Clinton

Funkadelic chronology
Hardcore Jollies (1976)	One Nation Under a Groove (1978)	Uncle Jam Wants You (1979)

Singles from One Nation Under a Groove
- 1. "One Nation Under a Groove" Released: 1978; 2. "Cholly (Funk Getting Ready to Roll!)" Released: 1979

One Nation Under a Groove is the tenth studio album by American funk rock band Funkadelic, released on September 22, 1978, on Warner Bros. Records. Recording sessions took place at United Sound Studio in Detroit, with one song recorded live on April 15, 1978, at the Monroe Civic Center in Monroe, Louisiana. The album was the first album to include keyboardist and frequent songwriter Walter "Junie" Morrison.

One Nation Under a Groove was Funkadelic's most commercially successful album, reaching number 1 on the Billboard Top R&B/Hip-Hop Albums chart, number 16 on the Billboard 200, and being certified platinum in the US. It reached number 58 in Canada. It was acclaimed by critics, and appears in several "best album" lists. It was featured on Vibe's 100 Essential Albums of the 20th Century and 51 Essential Albums lists. The album was ranked number 177 on Rolling Stone's list of the 500 greatest albums of all time in both 2003 and 2012 editions, before moving to number 360 in the 2020 edition. The album is included in the book 1001 Albums You Must Hear Before You Die.

== Music ==
According to the academic Bill Martin, One Nation Under a Groove is indebted "a good deal more to progressive rock than most critics are willing to admit, as well as progressive soul, Hendrix, and Sly Stone".

== Critical reception ==
Professional ratings
Review scores
Source	Rating
AllMusic	5/5 stars
Billboard	(favorable)
Blender	5/5 stars
Christgau's Record Guide	A
Entertainment Weekly	A
Rolling Stone	5/5 stars
The Rolling Stone Album Guide	4/5 stars
Sputnikmusic	4/5

Susan Toepfer of the New York Daily News called the album "another skillful funkcollection from George, Bootsy and a considerable portion of the P-Funk crew."

Steve Huey of AllMusic claimed that "the whole album is full of fuzzed-out, Hendrix-style guitar licks, even when the music is clearly meant for the dancefloor...One Nation Under a Groove is the best realization of Funkadelic's ambitions, and one of the best funk albums ever released."

Ken Tucker of Entertainment Weekly found, "One Nation Under a Groove is a deep source of riffs and ideas for '90s rock and rap ... a glorious distillation of Funkadelic founder George Clinton's concepts of verbal anarchy and tight funk grooves."

== Track listing ==
=== Original LP ===
In the US, the original album came with a bonus 7-inch EP. In Europe, the bonus EP was replaced by a bonus 12-inch 45 rpm mini-album containing the 3 EP tracks on one side and an extended version of "One Nation Under a Groove" on the other.

Side one
No.	Title	Writer(s)	Length
1.	"One Nation Under a Groove"	George Clinton, Walter Morrison, Garry Shider	7:33
2.	"Groovallegiance"	Clinton, Morrison, Bernard Worrell	7:00
3.	"Who Says a Funk Band Can't Play Rock?!"	Clinton, Morrison, Michael Hampton	6:21

Side two
No.	Title	Writer(s)	Length
1.	"Promentalshitbackwashpsychosis Enema Squad (The Doo Doo Chasers)"	Clinton, Shider, Linda Brown	11:00
2.	"Into You"	Clinton, Morrison, William Collins	5:43
3.	"Cholly (Funk Getting Ready to Roll!)"	Clinton, Morrison, Collins	4:33
Total length:			42:10

Bonus EP side one (listed as side three on the label, side four on the cover)
No.	Title	Writer(s)	Length
1.	"Maggot Brain/Chant (Think It Ain't Illegal Yet!)" (Live at Monroe Civic Center, Monroe, Louisiana 15-4-78)	Clinton, Edward Hazel	8:30

Bonus EP side two (listed as side four on the label, side three on the cover)
No.	Title	Writer(s)	Length
1.	"Lunchmeataphobia (Think! It Ain't Illegal Yet!)"	Clinton, Worrell	4:16
2.	"P.E. Squad/Doo Doo Chasers"	Clinton, Shider, Brown	4:40
Total length:			17:26

=== US Priority CD ===
(note that the UK Charly Groove presents side one of the EP (Lunchmeat/PE) as tracks 7 & 8 and side two (Maggot Brain) as track 9.

No.	Title	Writer(s)	Length
1.	"One Nation Under a Groove"	George Clinton, Walter Morrison, Garry Shider	7:29
2.	"Groovallegiance"	Clinton, Morrison, Bernard Worrell	7:00
3.	"Who Says a Funk Band Can't Play Rock?!"	Clinton, Morrison, Michael Hampton	6:18
4.	"Promentalshitbackwashpsychosis Enema Squad (The Doo Doo Chasers)"	Clinton, Shider, Linda Brown	10:45
5.	"Into You"	Clinton, Morrison, William Collins	5:41
6.	"Cholly (Funk Getting Ready To Roll!)"	Clinton, Morrison, Collins	4:27
7.	"Maggot Brain/Chant (Think It Ain't Illegal Yet!)" (Live)	Clinton, Edward Hazel	8:28
8.	"Lunchmeataphobia (Think! It Ain't Illegal Yet!)"	Clinton, Worrell	4:12
9.	"P.E. Squad/Doo Doo Chasers"	Clinton, Shider, Brown	4:18
Total length:			58:38

== Personnel ==
Funkadelic Main Invasion Force (as given in the liner notes):

- Throbbasonic Funkgeetarists:
  - Mike 'Kidd Funkadelic' Hampton, Gary Shider
- Banjo'd Muthaplucker:
  - Bobby Lewis
- Avatarian
  - Mike Hampton
- Keybo' Dans & Synthezoidees:
  - Bernie 'DaVinci' Worrell, Walter 'Junie' Morrison
- Rotofunkie Drum & Percussionatin' Thumpdans:
  - Jerome Brailey, W. Bootsy Collins, Larry Fratangelo, Tyrone Lampkin
- Bass Thumpasaurians:
  - William 'Bootsy' Collins, Rodney "Skeet" Curtis, Cordell 'Boogie' Mosson
- Funkadelic Blamgusta Vocaloids (Voices For Da Nation!):
  - George Clinton, Raymond (Stingray) Davis, Ron Ford, Mallia Franklin, Lynn Mabry, W. 'Junie' Morrison, Cordell Mosson, Dawn Silva, Gary "Dowop" Shider, Greg Thomas, Jeanette Washington, Debbie Wright

== See also ==
- List of number-one R&B albums of 1978 (U.S.)
