= Michael Hampton =

American funk and rock guitarist (born 1956)

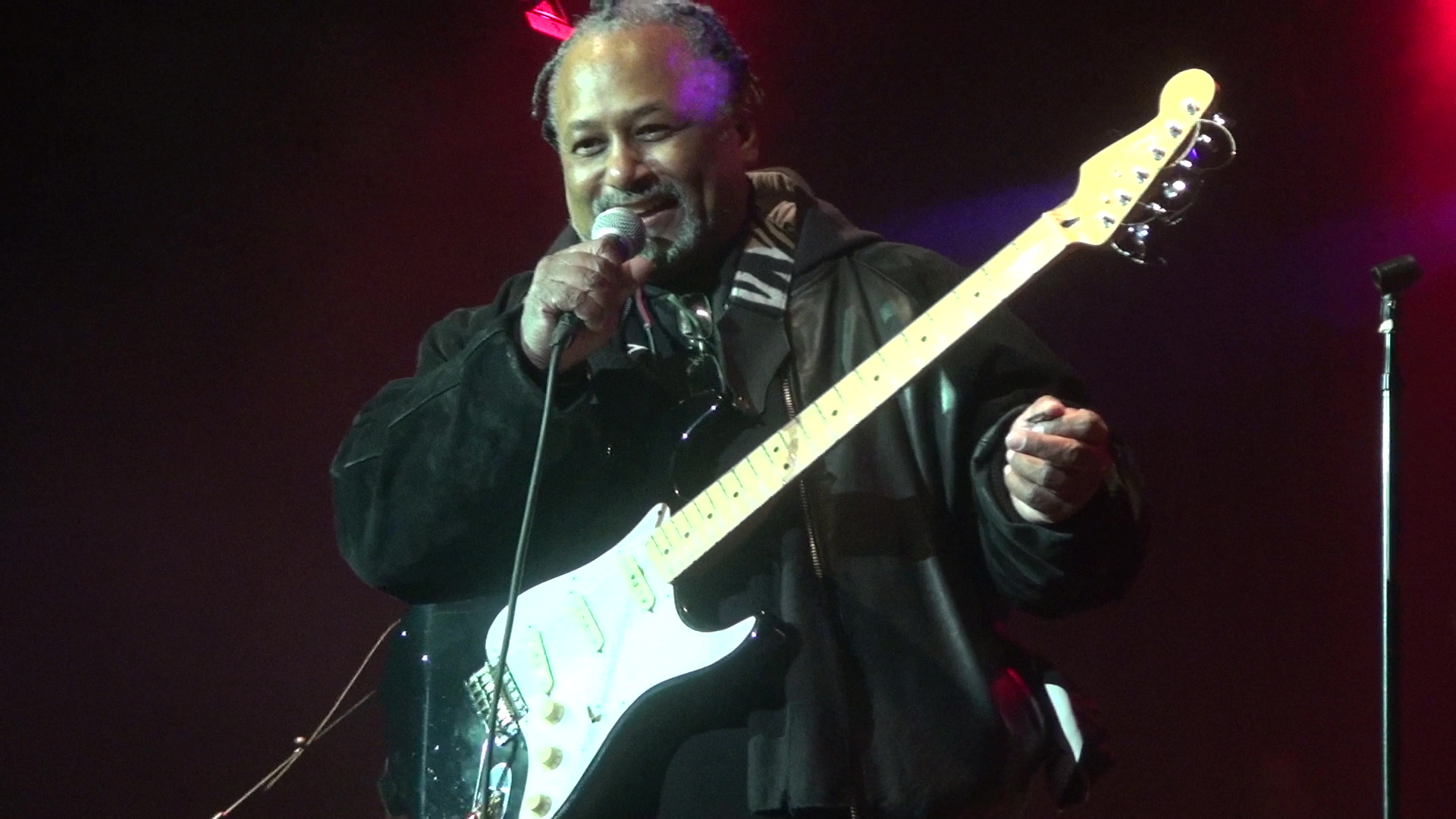
- Hampton at the Million Man Mosh in 2012

Background information
- Born: November 15, 1956 (age 69); Cleveland, Ohio, U.S.
- Genres: R&B; funk; psychedelic soul; rock
- Occupations: Musician, record producer
- Instrument: Guitar
- Years active: 1974–present
- Labels: Westbound, Ace, Casablanca, Warner Bros., CBS, P-Vine, Capitol, Arista, Atlantic, A&M

Michael Hampton (born November 15, 1956) is an American funk/rock guitarist. He is a member of the Rock and Roll Hall of Fame, inducted in 1997 with fifteen other members of Parliament-Funkadelic.

== Career ==
Hampton was born in Cleveland, Ohio, and started his professional career when he was recruited as a seventeen-year-old guitar prodigy by the band Funkadelic, which found itself in need of a lead guitarist after original guitarist Eddie Hazel left the band. Hampton impressed Funkadelic's George Clinton by performing a note-for-note rendition of Hazel's ten-minute solo "Maggot Brain". Hampton made his debut with the band's album Let's Take It to the Stage in 1975, which is dominated by his guitar. Hampton's playing included fuzzy, Hendrix-inspired licks and wailing harmonics. Due to his young age, Hampton was nicknamed "Kidd Funkadelic".

Hampton became a fixture in Funkadelic, and he continued his role as lead guitarist even during Hazel's sporadic returns to the band. Hampton's performances of "Maggot Brain" — which had become more improvised – became regular features of live Parliament-Funkadelic shows, and the song became his signature concert performance. The bonus-EP of Funkadelic's One Nation Under a Groove (1978) included a live version of the song featuring Hampton. One of his most celebrated performances is the lead guitar solo on the Funkadelic hit single "(Not Just) Knee Deep" from 1979, as well the title track to the Brides of Funkenstein's second album Never Buy Texas From A Cowboy.

In 1981, Clinton was forced to disband the P-Funk musical empire due to financial and legal difficulties. In 1993, Hampton performed on the album Under the 6 with Slave Master. Hampton continued to perform on albums released under Clinton's name, which featured many other P-Funk mainstays as well, and he became a member of the P-Funk All-Stars. In 1998, he released his first solo album entitled Heavy Metal Funkason through the P-Vine label in Japan.

In 2022, Hampton joined Chuck Treece to form the funk/punk fusion group Punkadelic. With Hampton on guitar and Treece on bass and drums, Punkadelic performed both original music and Funkadelic covers in Philadelphia, Mexico, and live on the radio at WOCM Ocean 98 in Ocean City, Maryland. Punkadelic released two singles and an original EP titled Collective Consciousness in 2023.

Hampton joined Parliament Funkadelic for the Parliament Funkadelic Tour 2025, which included seven dates from November 2025 through the end of January 2026.
