= Sandra Feva =

American singer (1947–2020)

- Also known as: Sandra Richardson; Sandra Feva-Dance
- Born: Sandra Arnold; May 14, 1947; Los Angeles, California
- Origin: Detroit, Michigan
- Died: June 26, 2020 (aged 73)
- Genres: Jazz, soul
- Occupations: Singer, songwriter
- Years active: 1971–2000
- Labels: Buddah, Venture, Grandstand, Krisma, Catawba
- Formerly of: George Clinton, P-Funk, Aretha Franklin, Prince

Sandra Feva (born Sandra Arnold, May 14, 1947 – June 26, 2020), also known as Sandra Richardson, was an American soul singer, composer, and backing vocalist.

== Background ==
She was born in Los Angeles, California, the oldest of five siblings, but grew up in Detroit, Michigan, after her family moved there. She began singing as a child, and in the early 1970s made her first recordings, as Sandra Richardson. She recorded several singles for small labels, many with producer Tony Camillo .

== Career ==
After changing her name to Sandra Feva, she gained national attention as a background vocalist with Aretha Franklin, Prince, and George Clinton. As a solo act she had her first hit single in 1979 with her version of "The Need to Be", and released several albums, including Kick it Out, The Need to Be (1979), Savoir Faire (1981), and Fever All Through The Nigh (1989). Her 1981 single "Tell 'Em I Heard It" peaked at number 33 on the Billboard R&B chart, and she had further R&B chart hits with "You Can't Come Up Here No More" (1986), and "Here Now" (1987).

== later years ==
She had a stroke in 2000, which ended her music career, and in 2009 became a minister in the Third New Hope Baptist Church in Detroit. She died in 2020, at the age of 73.
