= Michael "Clip" Payne =

American musician (born 1958)

Michael "Clip" Payne (born William Michael Payne on September 25, 1958 in Detroit, Michigan) is an American musician. He has been a member of Parliament, Funkadelic, The P-Funk Allstars and the Parliament-Funkadelic collective since 1977.

== Career ==
First credited on Parliament's 1979 release "Gloryhallastoopid" with "Choir/Chorus", he has appeared on over 20 Parliament-Funkadelic collective recordings primarily as a vocalist and keyboardist. Payne, who is sometimes called "The Man in the Box", typically acts as an on-stage commentator during Parliament-Funkadelic's live performances.

Payne's first professional work was the recording of Edwin Starr's "Twenty-Five Miles" with producer Norman Whitfield.

Payne founded WEFUNK International in the late 1980s as a vehicle for his solo projects which became WEFUNK AD2k Records and Filmworks in 1999. Payne is listed as the CEO of the company which is based in Woodstock, NY. Currently associated with the label are the groups DRUGS, 420 Funk Mob, and Cacophonic FM, all of which are led by Payne, as well as Stefanie Keys, Joey Eppard, and Stoney Clove Lane.

The winter of 2019 Mike Clip Payne and Parliament/Funkadelic have begun the band's final "One Nation Under A Groove" Tour with Fishbone, Galactic, Dumpstaphunk and Miss Velvet and the Blue Wolf. This year has also seen the debut of Mr Payne as an actor, appearing in the Independent film "The Plagiarists". Variety stated, "Michael Payne is a musician and it shows in his delicious, melodic delivery of this prose-poem." His performance was singled out by the online publication, Film Threat, "Clip is welcoming but laconic. Payne does a formidable job balancing 'Warm and Erie'.. kudos to Payne who expertly handles a tricky scene."

== Selected discography ==
Funkadelic

1978 Funkadelic: One Nation Under a Groove Released: 1978 Label: Warner Brothers

1979 Funkadelic: Uncle Jam Wants You Released: 1979 Label: Warner Brothers

1981 Funkadelic: The Electric Spanking of War Babies Released: 1981 Label: Warner Brothers

2014 Funkadelic: First Ya Gotta Shake the Gate Released: 2014 Label: The C Kunspyruhzy

Parliament

1977 Parliament: Funkentelechy vs the Placebo Syndrome Released: 1977 Label: Casablanca

1977 Parliament: Live (PFunk Earth Tour Released: 1977 Label: Casablanca

1978 Parliament: Motor Booty Affair Released: 1978 Label: Casablanca

1979 Parliament: Gloryhollastupid (Pin the Tail on the Funky) Released: 1979 Label: Casablanca

1980 Parliament: Trombipulation Released: 1980 Label: Casablanca

1994 Parliament Funkadelic P Funk Allstars: Dope Dog Released: 1984 Label: P-Vine Records

2004 George Clinton & Parliament/Funkadelic: Midtown Music Festival, Atlanta Georgia, 5/1/04 Released: 2004 Label: Instant live

2005 George Clinton & Parliament/Funkadelic: State Theater Portland Maine Released: 2005 Label: Instant live

2015 George Clinton & Parliament/Funkadelic: Chocolate City/London, P-Funk Live at Metropolis Box Set Released: 2015 Label: Metropolis Recording

2018 Parliament: Medicated Fraud Dog Released: 2018 Label: P-Vine

George Clinton albums

1982 George Clinton Computer Games Released: Label: Capitol Records

1983 George Clinton You Shouldn't-Nuf Bit Fish Released: Label: Capitol Records

1985 George Clinton Some of My Best Jokes Are Friends Released: Label: Capitol Records

1986 George Clinton R&B Skeletons in the Closet Released: Label: Capitol Records

1989 George Clinton The Cinderella Theory Released: Label: Paisley Park Records

1993 George Clinton Hey Man, Smell My Finger Released: Label: Paisley Park Records

1995 George Clinton Dope Dogs Released: Label: XYZ

1996 George Clinton T.A.P.O.A.F.O.M. Released: Label: Sony 550 Music

2005 George Clinton How Late Do U Have 2BB4UR Absent? Released: September 6, 2005 Label: The C Kunspyruhzy Format: CD

2008 George Clinton and His Gangsters of Love Released: September 16, 2008 Label: Shanachie Format: CD

Mike Clip Payne Solo Albums

2000 420 Funk Mob "Live on the Off Days" ** Released August 31, 2000 label: Wefunk Ad2k Recordings & Filmworks

2001 DRUGS: The Prescription for Mis-America ** Release September 11, 2001 label: Wefunk Ad2k Recordings & Filmworks

2005 420 Funk Mob: "Live in Spain" ** Released December 1, 2005 Label: Wefunk Ad2k Recordings & Filmworks

2008 420 Funk Mob: "Screamin' for More" ** Released Sept 25 2008 label: Wefunk Ad2k Recordings & Filmworks

Collaborations

1984 Red Hot Chili Peppers: Red Hot Chili Peppers Release date 1984 Label: EMI America/ Enigma Records

- What It Is (Nina's Song) Bonus Track

1985 Red Hot Chili Peppers: Freaky Styley Release date 1985 Label: EMI America

1991 MC Solaar: "Qui Sème le Vent Récolte le Tempo" ** Released Dec 1991 Label: Polydor Records

1992 Gotcha!: "Words & Music From Da Lowlands" ** Released 1991 Label: BMG / Ariola

1992 Gotcha!: "Gotcha!, Gotcha!, Gotcha!" ** Released 1992 Label: BMG / Ariola

1992 Jordy: "Dur Dur D'Être Bébé" ** Released 1992 Label: Columbia Records

- Youngest Artist (4 year old) ever to have a #1 single

1993 Sinclair: Le Fonk/ Superkato Released 1993 Label: Virgin

1994 Gotcha!: "Four! It, The Terra-P-Funk From Beyond Space" ** Released 1992 Label: Dureco

1999 Tony Allen: "Black Voices" ** Released 1999 Label: Comet Records

1999 Alex Gopher: "You, My Baby, and I" ** Released September 6, 1999 Label: Go 4 Music

2000 Etienne De Crecy: "Tempovision" ** Released October 26, 2000 label: Discus Solid

2009 John Deservio: Cycle of Pain Released 2009 Label: Reform Records

- (JD of Black Label Society)
  - Producer

== Sources ==
- David Mills, Larry Alexander, Thomas Stanley, and Aris Thomas, George Clinton and P-Funk: An Oral History (New York: Avon, 1998). ISBN 0-380-79378-4.
- Dave Thompson, Funk (San Francisco: Backbeat Books, 2001). ISBN 0-87930-629-7.
- Rickey Vincent, Funk: The Music, The People, and The Rhythm of The One (New York: St. Martin's Griffin, 1996). ISBN 0-312-13499-1.
- Michael Peter Balzary, Acid for the Children (New York: Grand Central Publishing, 2019) ISBN -978-1-4555-3053-3
- Ted Fox, Showtime at the Apollo (Da Capo Press; 1983) ISBN -978-0-3068-0503-5
- George Clinton with Ben Greenbaum, 2017 Brothas Be, Yo Like George, Ain't That Funkin' Kinda Hard On You?: A Memoir
