= DeWayne McKnight =

American guitarist

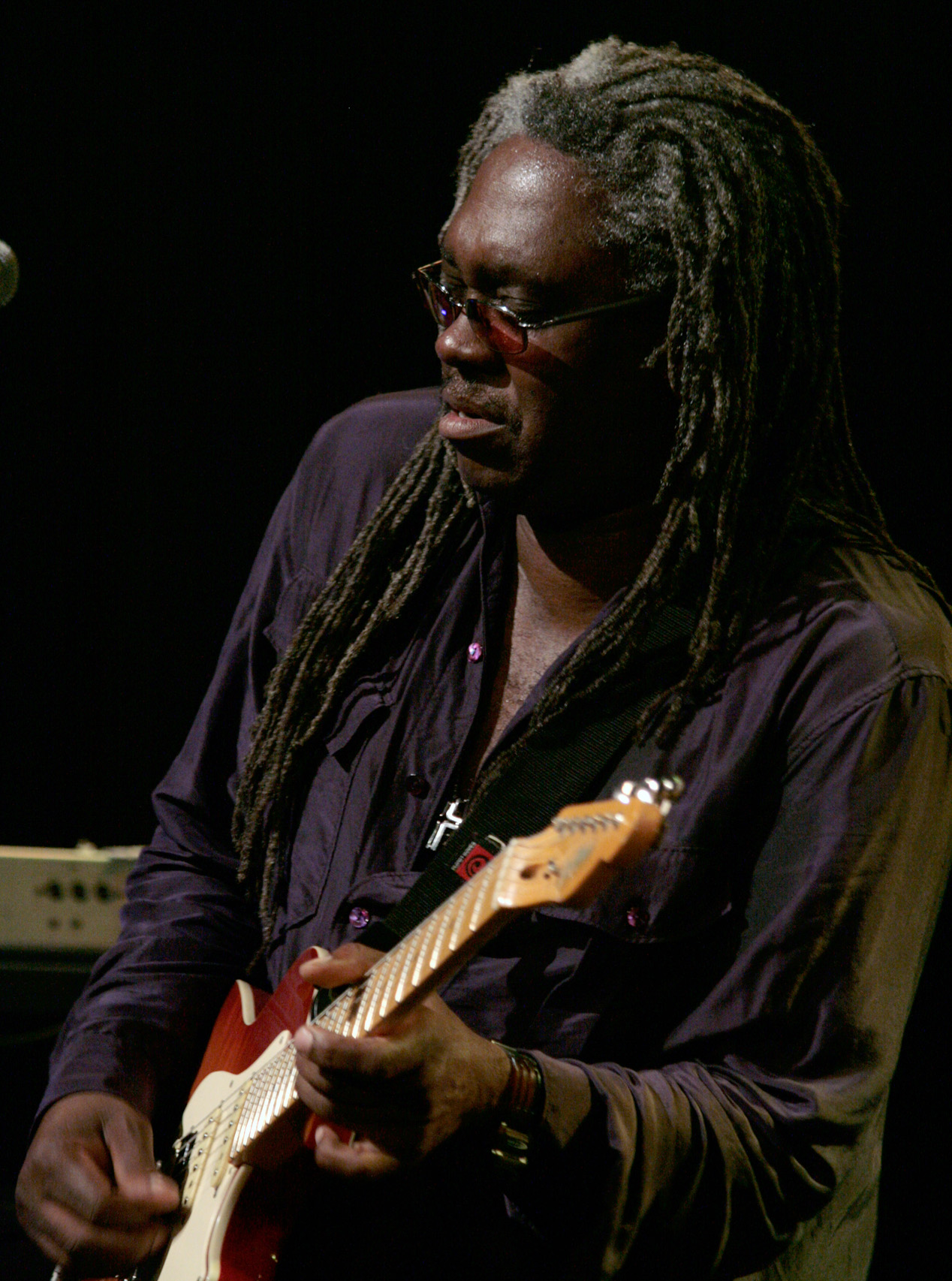
- McKnight in 2009

Background information
- Born: April 17, 1954 (age 72); Los Angeles, California, U.S.
- Genres: Funk, funk rock, jazz-funk
- Instrument: Guitar
- Formerly of: the Headhunters; Parliament-Funkadelic; Red Hot Chili Peppers
- Website: blackbyrdmcknight.net

DeWayne "Blackbyrd" McKnight (born April 17, 1954) is an American guitarist. From 1975 to 1978, he was a member of the Headhunters, a jazz-funk fusion band, and Parliament-Funkadelic from 1978 through 2021, with whom he still plays on occasion. He served briefly as guitarist for the Red Hot Chili Peppers after the death of Hillel Slovak in 1988 before being replaced by John Frusciante. He also played briefly with Miles Davis in 1986.
