= Tony Thomas (guitarist) =

American Guitarist

Tony "Strat" Thomas
- Born: June 2, 1959
- Died: February 6, 2022
- Genres: R&B; funk; psychedelic soul; blues
- Occupations: Musician, record producer
- Instrument: Guitar
- Years active: 1974–2022
- Labels: Westbound, Ace, Casablanca Records, Warner Bros. Records, CBS Records, P-Vine Records, Capitol Records, Arista Records, Atlantic Records, A&M records, Musart Media

Tony Thomas (also known as Tony "Strat" Thomas), (born June 2, 1959 – February 6, 2022) was an American funk and rock guitarist from Highland Park, Michigan U.S., and was best known for his work with George Clinton, Parliament, and the P-Funk All-Stars. Thomas also recorded extensively with Muruga Booker, and was a guitarist in Muruga Cosmic Boogie and Muruga Blues All-Stars.

As a teenager, Thomas fell in love with the sound of the Fender Stratocaster guitar, and his mother eventually bought him one, earning him the nickname "Strat" ever since. He quickly learned how to play and he soon joined a Detroit, Michigan reggae band called Onyx.

In 1979, Thomas and Donnie Sterling formed a P-Funk offspring group called Sterling Silver Starship, and an album was recorded, but was never released. Thomas and Sterling left Sterling Silver Starship in 1981 and formed a group, Kiddo, and they recorded a self-titled album that was released by A&M Records.

In 1982 Thomas played guitar on George Clinton's first solo recording project Computer Games, which included the hit songs Atomic Dog and Loopzilla. Thomas went on to record through the 1980s with P-Funk, and was featured on many of their biggest-selling records.

In 2014 Thomas joined fellow P-Funk All-Star Muruga Booker to form Muruga & The Cosmic Hoedown Band (later changed to Muruga Cosmic Boogie), and they recorded several projects including a couple with George Clinton and several other members of the P-Funk All Stars. In 2015 Thomas and Muruga & The Cosmic Hoedown Band performed at the eighth annual Concert of Colors in Detroit, Michigan, performing with the Don Was Detroit All-Star Revue, and was a featured soloist playing Maggot Brain.

In 2017 Thomas and Booker also formed a blues band called Booker Blues All-Stars and recorded an album in honor of John Lee Hooker's 100th anniversary birthday celebration, called Booker Plays Hooker, which also features Rock & Roll Hall of Fame inductee J.C. "Billy" Davis, Peter Madcat Ruth, Misty Love, John Sauter, and Shakti Booker.

Thomas' guitar work with George Clinton and Parliament-Funkadelic related projects has been sampled by many artists, including Snoop Dogg, Dr. Dre, Ice Cube, Digital Underground, Too Short, Tweedy Bird Loc and Ruthless Rap Assassins.

Due to his guitar tone and playing style, Thomas has been compared to Jimi Hendrix and Eddie Hazel.

Thomas died on February 6, 2022, aged 62. Two hours after George Clinton announced the death of Tony Thomas on his Facebook page, Eric Brenner confirmed the story with Steve Muruga Booker. Booker told Brenner that Tony "Strat" Thomas died on a couch at band practice.

== Discography ==
- 1980 – Parliament – Trombipulation
- 1981 – Funkadelic – The Electric Spanking of War Babies
- 1982 – George Clinton – Computer Games
- 1983 – Kiddo – Kiddo
- 1983 – P-Funk All Stars – Urban Dancefloor Guerillas
- 1983 – P-Funk All Stars – Hydraulic Funk
- 1985 – Jimmy G. & The Tackheads – Federation Of Tackheads
- 1993 – Parliament – Tear the Roof Off 1974–1980
- 1993 – George Clinton / George Clinton & the P-Funk All-Stars – Family Series, Vol. 1: Go Fer Yer Funk
- 1993 – George Clinton / George Clinton & the P-Funk All-Stars – Family Series, Vol. 2: Plush Funk
- 1993 – George Clinton / George Clinton & the P-Funk All-Stars – Family Series, Vol. 3: P Is the Funk
- 1994 – George Clinton And The P-Funk All Stars – P-Funk Unreleased Remix
- 1994 – George Clinton / George Clinton & the P-Funk All-Stars – Family Series, Vol. 4 – Testing Positive 4 The Funk
- 1995 – George Clinton / George Clinton & the P-Funk All-Stars – Family Series, Vol. 5 – A Fifth of Funk
- 1995 – Parliament – The Best of Parliament: Give Up the Funk
- 1996 – George Clinton – Greatest Funkin' Hits
- 1998 – George Clinton and The P-Funk Allstars – Funk Permission Card
- 2000 – Parliament – The Best Of Parliament
- 2000 – Parliament – 20th Century Masters - The Millennium Collection: The Best of Parliament
- 2005 – Parliament – Gold
- 2014 – The New Newz – Deer Dreamers
- 2015 – Muruga & The Cosmic Hoedown Band meet George Clinton & P-Funk All-Stars – The Fathership – Mothership World Connection
- 2016 – Wormhole Cafe (feat. P-Funk All-Stars & more) – At The Wormhole Cafe
- 2016 – Muruga & The Cosmic Hoedown Band – Harmonious World
- 2017 – Booker Blues All Stars – Booker Plays Hooker
