= Live at the Beverly Theater =

Live album by P-Funk All-Stars
- Released: 1990
- Recorded: April 23, 1983
- Venue: Beverly Theater
- Genre: Funk
- Length: 89:33
- Label: Westbound Records
- Producer: George Clinton

P-Funk All-Stars chronology
Urban Dancefloor Guerillas (1983)	Live at the Beverly Theater (1990)	Dope Dogs (1994)

Professional ratings
Review scores
Source	Rating
AllMusic	3/5 stars

Live at the Beverly Theater is a live album by the P-Funk All-Stars. It was recorded at the Beverly Theatre in California on April 23 and 24 of 1983 and was originally broadcast by the Westwood One radio network.

Prince claimed that he attended one of the shows, which inspired him to record "Erotic City". Live at the Beverly Theater was released by Westbound Records in 1990.

Two songs broadcast by Westwood One were not included on Live at the Beverly Theater: "Standing on the Verge of Getting It On" and "Loopzilla." Bootsy Collins performed the song "Body Slam" at the concert, but it was neither broadcast nor was it included on the album.

The cover of Live at the Beverly Theater features artwork from longtime P-Funk album artist Pedro Bell.

== Track listing ==
Side One
No.	Title	Length
1.	"P-Funk (Wants to Get Funked Up)"	2:20
2.	"Do That Stuff"	10:52
3.	"Cosmic Slop"	10:13

Side Two
No.	Title	Length
1.	"Medley": a. "Let's Take It to the Stage" b. "Mothership Connection (Star Child)" c. "I Call My Baby Pussycat"	8:37
2.	"Give Up the Funk (Tear the Roof off the Sucker)"	12:47

Side Three
No.	Title	Length
1.	"(Not Just) Knee Deep"	13:00
2.	"Maggot Brain"	16:47

Side Four
No.	Title	Length
1.	"Atomic Dog"	9:59
2.	"Flash Light"	4:58
Total length:		89:33

== Personnel ==
- Bass: Rodney "Skeet" Curtis, Lige Curry (On “Maggot Brain”)
- Guitar: Michael Hampton, Garry Shider, Eddie Hazel, Cordell Mosson, DeWayne "Blackbyrd" McKnight
- Drums - Dennis Chambers
- Horns: Benny Cowan (trumpet), Greg Thomas (saxophone), and Greg Boyer (trombone)
- Keyboards: Bernie Worrell, Jerome Rogers
- Vocals: George Clinton, Garry Shider, Lige Curry, Gary "Mudbone" Cooper, Robert "P-Nut" Johnson, Michael "Clip" Payne, Ron Ford
- MC, Flute, Cowbell: Maceo Parker

== Extra links ==
- Live at the Beverly Theater at Discogs
