= First Ya Gotta Shake the Gate =

Studio album by Funkadelic
- Released: November 25, 2014
- Genres: Funk; hip-hop; trap; groove metal; soul jazz; g-funk
- Length: 207:34
- Label: The C Kunspyruhzy
- Producer: Original sessions produced by George Clinton

Funkadelic chronology
| U.S. Music with Funkadelic (2009) | First Ya Gotta Shake the Gate (2014) |

Singles from First Ya Gotta Shake the Gate
- 1. "The Naz" Released: April 20, 2013; 2. "Ain't That Funkin' Kinda Hard on You?" Released: October 21, 2014

First Ya Gotta Shake the Gate is the fourteenth and final studio album by American funk rock band Funkadelic. The album was released by the C Kunspyruhzy in 2014 and consists of newly recorded material.

The album consists of 3 discs comprising 33 tracks in total, which has been explained to mirror the 33 years that had elapsed since Funkadelic's last official album release in 1981, The Electric Spanking of War Babies. Like most of the Funkadelic catalog, the album features cover artwork by artist Pedro Bell.

== Release ==
First Ya Gotta Shake the Gate was released in digital format on November 25, 2014. The official CD release, after first being announced for December 1, was delayed to December 23, 2014.

The album's first single released was "The Naz", a song featuring Sly Stone, in 2013. A second single, "Ain't That Funkin' Kinda Hard on You?", was digitally released on October 21, 2014, in connection with the release of George Clinton's autobiography, Brothers Be, Yo Like George, Ain't That Funkin' Kinda Hard on You?.

"As In" is a remake of Bootsy's Rubber Band's "As In (I Love You)" and features the late Jessica Cleaves on vocals. This album also features the first appearances of George's grandson Trazae rapping on a few tunes, and George's granddaughters Kandy Apple Redd, and George's stepdaughter Nakid 87, Sidney Barnes, Sly Stone, and posthumous appearances by Garry Shider and Belita Woods are featured on the album. Garry's son Garrett Shider replaces his father. This was the last Funkadelic project keyboardist Bernie Worrell contributed to before his death in 2016.

== Critical reception ==
Ken Capobianco of the Boston Globe favourably claimed "Judicious pruning would have been welcome, but it’s impossible to complain about a jollies overload, especially with so much virtuosity on display."

== Track listing ==
Disc one
| No. | Title | Writer(s) | Length |
|---|---|---|---|
| 1. | "Baby Like Fonkin' It Up" | George Clinton, Novena Carmel, Tracey Lewis, Tra'zae Lewis-Clinton & Gilberto Fuentes | 9:37 |
| 2. | "Get Low" | George Clinton, Tairee Parks, Lashonda Clinton & Tracey Lewis | 5:44 |
| 3. | "If I Didn't Love You" | Novena Carmel | 4:01 |
| 4. | "Fucked Up" | George Clinton, Robert Johnson & Bouvier Richardson | 7:43 |
| 5. | "Ain't That Funkin' Kinda Hard on You?" | George Clinton, Robert Mandell | 5:30 |
| 6. | "I Mo B Yodog Fo Eva" | George Clinton, Tairee Parks & Tracey Lewis | 5:14 |
| 7. | "In da Kar" | George Clinton, Novena Carmel, Eli Goldstein, Charles Levine | 8:50 |
| 8. | "Radio Friendly" | George Clinton & Tracey Lewis | 6:17 |
| 9. | "Mathematics of Love" | George Clinton & Novena Carmel | 12:10 |
| 10. | "Creases" (featuring Del the Funky Homosapien) | George Clinton & Teren Delvon Jones | 3:11 |
| 11. | "Not Your Average Rapper" | George Clinton, Tra'zae Lewis-Clinton & Robert Mandell | 3:17 |
| Total length: | | | 70:14 |

Disc two
| No. | Title | Writer(s) | Length |
|---|---|---|---|
| 12. | "First Ya Gotta Shake the Gate" | George Clinton, Eli Goldstein, Charles Levine, Tracey Lewis | 9:06 |
| 13. | "Roller Rink" | George Clinton, Tracey Lewis, Robert Johnson & Kendra Foster | 11:34 |
| 14. | "Jolene" | George Clinton, Brad Jordan | 7:52 |
| 15. | "Nuclear Dog Part II" (featuring "Blackbyrd" McKnight) | George Clinton, Tracey Lewis, Tra'zae Lewis-Clinton | 6:42 |
| 16. | "Dirty Queen" (featuring God's Weapon) | Trafael Lewis | 3:45 |
| 17. | "You Can't Unring the Bell" | George Clinton, Robert Mandell & Robert Johnson | 3:01 |
| 18. | "Old Fool" | George Clinton, Robert Mandell & Brandi Scott | 3:33 |
| 19. | "Pole Power" | George Clinton, Tracey Lewis, Ebony Houston & Robert Mandell | 7:02 |
| 20. | "Boom There We Go Again" | George Clinton & Robert Mandell | 2:56 |
| 21. | "As In" (featuring Jessica Cleaves) | George Clinton | 6:50 |
| 22. | "Bernadette" | Brian Holland-Lamont Dozier-Eddie Holland | 5:09 |
| 23. | "Meow Meow" | George Clinton, Brandi Scott, Robert Mandell & Tra'zae Lewis-Clinton | 6:46 |
| Total length: | | | 72:16 |

Disc three
| No. | Title | Writer(s) | Length |
|---|---|---|---|
| 24. | "Catchin' Boogie Fever" | Tracey Lewis, Robert Mandell & George Clinton | 5:57 |
| 25. | "The Naz" (featuring Sly Stone) | Lord Buckley, Novena Carmel, Rob Manzoli | 5:38 |
| 26. | "Talking to the Wall" | Garrett Shider & George Clinton | 4:44 |
| 27. | "Where Would I Go?" | George Clinton & Garrett Shider | 4:27 |
| 28. | "Yesterdejavu" | George Clinton, Tra'zae Lewis-Clinton & Robert Manzoli | 7:57 |
| 29. | "Zip It" | George Clinton, Robert Mandell & Tracey Lewis | 3:36 |
| 30. | "The Wall" | George Clinton, D’metrius Hollis, Jerome Rodgers & Tra'zae Lewis-Clinton | 9:10 |
| 31. | "Snot n' Booger" | George Clinton & Tracey Lewis | 10:45 |
| 32. | "Yellow Light" | Novena Carmel | 4:34 |
| 33. | "Dipety Dipety Doo Stop the Violence" | George Clinton, Tra'zae Lewis-Clinton, Robert Mandell & Brandi Scott | 5:14 |
| Total length: | | | 60:02 |

== Personnel ==
Musicians

- Vocals – George Clinton, Sly Stone, Belita Woods, Garry Shider, Garrett Shider, Paul Hill, Kendra Foster, Steve Boyd, Robert 'P-Nut' Johnson, El DeBarge, Tracey "Treylewd" Lewis, Kandy Apple Redd (Tonysha Nelson and Patavian Lewis), Kim Manning, Sidney Barnes, Lashonda "Sativa Diva" Clinton, Jessica Cleaves, Kim Burrell, Rob Manzoli, Del the Funky Homosapien
- Guitars – DeWayne "Blackbyrd" McKnight, G Koop, Brad Jordan, Corey "Funkafangez" Stoot, Garry Shider, Tracey "Treylewd" Lewis, Trafael Lewis, Cliff Miles, Anthony Caruso, Michael Hampton, Garrett Shider, Jerome Ali, Jerome Rogers, Rob Manzoli, Eddie Hazel
- Keyboards – Sly Stone, Danny Bedrosian, Kennedy Jacobs, G Koop, Corey "Funkfangaz" Stoot, Chris "Big Dog" Davis, David Spradley, Graham Richards, Bernie Worrell, Ricky Tan, Rob Manzoli
- Bass – Hunter Daws, Lige Curry, Anthony Nickels, Trafael Lewis, Bora Karaca, Jeff "Cherokee" Bunn, G Koop, Bootsy Collins, Cordell "Boogie" Mosson, David Spradley, Rodney "Skeet" Curtis, Jimmy Ali, Rob Manzoli
- Drums – Nestor Mumm-Altuve, Max MacVeety, Savar Martin, Trafael Lewis, Rudge Ravinwood, Donald "Duck" Bailey, Tyrone Lampkin, DJ Toure, Rob Manzoli
- Drum programming – Ricky Tan, Eli Goldstein, Del the Funky Homosapien, G Koop, Barrence Dupree, Soul Clap, Dwayne Dungey, George Clinton, David Spradley, Sa'D "The Hourchild" Ali, William Tyler Pelt
- Percussion – Bootsy Collins, Gary "Mudbone" Cooper, Larry Fratangelo
- Saxophone – Maceo Parker, Andrae Grant
- Trumpet – Whitney Russell, O.J., Rick Gardner, Dave Richards, Marion Ross III
- Trombone – Fred Wesley, Dave Richards
- Violin – Jay Golden, Lili Haydn
- Didgeridoo – William Thoren

Technical

- Producer – George Clinton
- Co-producers – Rob 'G-Koop' Mandell, Soul Clap (Eli Goldstein and Charles Levine), Rob Manzoli, Sue Brooks Quazedelic
- Chief Project Engineer – Barrence Dupree
- Mastering – Rodney Mills
- Album art – Pedro Bell
