= Music for Your Mother: Funkadelic 45s =

Music For Your Mother: Funkadelic 45s

Compilation album by Funkadelic
- Released: 1993
- Recorded: 1968–1976
- Genre: Funk, psychedelic soul, rock
- Length: 131:33
- Label: Westbound

Professional ratings
Review scores
Source	Rating
AllMusic	5/5 stars
Q	3/5 stars
Rolling Stone	favorable (1993) (2004)
Village Voice	favorable

Music For Your Mother is a compilation album by Funkadelic, featuring songs recorded for Westbound Records during the band's career with that label from 1968 to 1976. The compilation includes the A-sides and B-sides of every Funkadelic single released during Funkadelic's tenure at Westbound. Some of the tracks here originated as alternate versions of album tracks or as non-album B-sides, and some were previously unreleased. Two tracks, "I Miss My Baby" and "Baby I Owe You Something Good" (original version) were originally released by Westbound under the group name U.S. Music With Funkadelic, which was probably meant to denote "U.S. with music by Funkadelic" or simply "U.S. with Funkadelic." U.S. refers to the band United Soul that had been discovered and produced by George Clinton in 1971, and which contained future Parliament-Funkadelic members Garry Shider and Cordell Mosson.

The CD booklet features an extensive 20,000-word article by music writer and Parliament-Funkadelic historian Rob Bowman. In the 2000s, many of the non-LP tracks included in this anthology were added as bonus tracks on Westbound CD reissues of their respective original albums.

== Track listing ==
=== Disc One ===
No.	Title	Writer(s)	Album	Length
1.	"Music for My Mother" (W 148, 1969)	Clinton, Nelson, Hazel	Funkadelic (alt. version)	5:18
2.	"Music for My Mother [Instrumental]" (W 148, 1969)	Clinton, Nelson, Hazel		6:13
3.	"Can't Shake It Loose" (previously unreleased, scheduled as W 149, 1969)	Clinton, Barnes, McCoy, Jackson		2:28
4.	"As Good As I Can Feel" (previously unreleased, scheduled as W 149, 1969)	Clinton, Haskins		2:32
5.	"I'll Bet You" (W 150, 1969)	Clinton, Barnes, Lindsey	Funkadelic (alt. version)	3:58
6.	"Qualify and Satisfy" (W 150, 1969)	Clinton, Hazel, Nelson	Funkadelic (edit)	3:02
7.	"Open Our Eyes" (W 150, 1969)	Lumkins		4:01
8.	"I Got a Thing, You Got a Thing, Everybody Got a Thing" (W 158, 1970)	Haskins	Funkadelic (edit)	2:59
9.	"Fish, Chips and Sweat" (W 158, 1970)	Clinton, Nelson, Hazel		2:59
10.	"I Wanna Know If It's Good to You" (W 167, 1970)	Clinton, Nelson, Hazel, Haskins	Free Your Mind... and Your Ass Will Follow (edit)	2:51
11.	"I Wanna Know If It's Good to You [Instrumental]" (W 167, 1970)	Clinton, Nelson, Hazel, Haskins	Free Your Mind... and Your Ass Will Follow (edit)	3:10
12.	"You and Your Folks, Me and My Folks" (W 175, 1971)	Clinton, Worrell, Jones	Maggot Brain (extended version)	3:48
13.	"Funky Dollar Bill" (W 175, 1971)	Clinton, Hazel, Davis	Free Your Mind... and Your Ass Will Follow (alt. mix)	3:06
14.	"Can You Get to That" (W 185, 1971)	Clinton, Harris	Maggot Brain	2:49
15.	"Back in Our Minds" (W 185, 1971)	Haskins	Maggot Brain	2:39
16.	"I Miss My Baby" (W 197, 1972, by U.S. Music with Funkadelic)	Haskins		4:18
Total length:				56:11

=== Disc Two ===
No.	Title	Writer(s)	Album	Length
1.	"Baby I Owe You Something Good" (W 197, 1972, by U.S. Music with Funkadelic)	Clinton		3:50
2.	"Hit It and Quit It" (W 198, 1972)	Clinton, Nelson	Maggot Brain (edit)	2:46
3.	"A Whole Lot of BS" (W 198, 1972)	Clinton, Worrell		1:18
4.	"Loose Booty" (W 205, 1972)	Clinton, Beane	America Eats Its Young (edit)	3:13
5.	"A Joyful Process" (W 205, 1972)	Clinton, Worrell	America Eats Its Young (edit)	3:25
6.	"Cosmic Slop" (W 218, 1973)	Clinton, Worrell	Cosmic Slop (edit)	3:22
7.	"If You Don't Like the Effects, Don't Produce the Cause" (W 218, 1973)	Clinton, Shider	America Eats Its Young (edit)	3:33
8.	"Standing on the Verge of Getting It On" (W 224, 1974)	Clinton, Cook	Standing on the Verge of Getting It On (edit)	3:18
9.	"Jimmy's Got a Little Bit of Bitch in Him" (W 224, 1974)	Clinton, Cook	Standing on the Verge of Getting It On	2:29
10.	"Red Hot Mamma" (W 5000, 1975)	Clinton, Hazel, Worrell	Standing on the Verge of Getting It On (edit)	3:24
11.	"Vital Juices" (W 5000, 1975)	Clinton		3:11
12.	"Better By the Pound" (W 5014, 1975)	Clinton, Cook	Let's Take It to the Stage	2:42
13.	"Stuffs and Things" (W 5014, 1975)	Clinton, Cook	Let's Take It to the Stage	2:12
14.	"Let's Take It to the Stage" (W 5026, 1976)	Clinton, Collins, Shider	Let's Take It to the Stage (edit)	3:20
15.	"Biological Speculation" (W 5026, 1976)	Clinton, Harris	America Eats Its Young	3:08
16.	"Undisco Kidd" (W 5029, 1976)	Clinton, Collins, Worrell	Tales of Kidd Funkadelic (edit)	4:12
17.	"How Do Yeaw View You" (W 5029, 1976)	Clinton, Collins, Worrell	Tales of Kidd Funkadelic	3:42
Total length:				53:05

== Other sources ==
Liner notes to Music For Your Mother by Rob Bowman, 1992.
