= U.S. Music with Funkadelic =

Studio album by U.S. Music with Funkadelic
- Released: 2009
- Recorded: 1972
- Length: 24:57 (vinyl) / 32:49 (CD)
- Labels: Westbound Records; Ace (Europe)
- Producers: Bernie Worrell, "Fuzzy" Haskins, and Ray Davis

Funkadelic chronology
Toys (2008)	U.S. Music with Funkadelic (2009)	First Ya Gotta Shake the Gate (2014)

U.S. Music with Funkadelic is a self-titled album consisting of tracks recorded in the early 1970s by the band United Soul with input from members of Funkadelic. The album was released by Westbound Records in 2009, and was licensed by Ace Records for its European release.

== Background ==
U.S. Music with Funkadelic was George Clinton's first attempt to launch a P-Funk spinoff act using up-and-coming musicians from his hometown of Plainfield, New Jersey. "U.S." refers to the band United Soul, whose lead vocalist and guitarist Garry Shider provided guest vocals on the Funkadelic album Maggot Brain in 1971. Following this, Clinton signed United Soul to his label, Parliafunkadelicment Thang Inc, and facilitated a collaboration between them and a few of his Funkadelic bandmates who were based in Toronto at the time. The group recorded the five songs presented on this album, and the tracks "Baby I Owe You Something Good" and "I Miss My Baby" were originally released as a one-off single by Westbound in 1972. The release was credited to "U.S. Music with Funkadelic", which was probably meant to denote "U.S. with Music by Funkadelic" or simply "U.S. with Funkadelic".

Following this collaboration, Garry Shider officially joined the Parliament-Funkadelic collective together with fellow United Soul members Larry and Cordell Mosson, and in 1973 an alternate version of their song "This Broken Heart" was included on the Funkadelic album Cosmic Slop. A slower version of "Baby I Owe You Something Good" was recorded by Funkadelic for the 1975 album Let's Take It to the Stage, and The Brides of Funkenstein recorded their own version of "Rat Kiss the Cat on the Navel" in 1977, which was later featured on the 1993 compilation album A Fifth of Funk. The original United Soul recordings from the 1972 single were included on the 1993 compilation Music for Your Mother: Funkadelic 45s, and when the back catalog of Funkadelic albums was remastered and re-released on CD in 2005, the original version of "Baby I Owe You Something Good" was included as a bonus track on Let's Take It to the Stage and "I Miss My Baby" was included with Maggot Brain.

== Critical reception ==
Professional ratings
Review scores
Source	Rating
AllMusic	3.5/5 stars

Upon its release in 2009, AllMusic reviewer Sean Westergaard awarded U.S. Music with Funkadelic with 3.5 out of a possible 5 stars. He reviewed the album favorably, stating that "this is a full, finished album, not simply a roundup of unfinished/unused tracks. And it's a good one too!", and concluding that it may be "a bit on the short side, but it's quality stuff. U.S. Music with Funkadelic is a solid album and an interesting missing link that's sure to please Funkadelic fans."

== Track listing ==
Vinyl release
No.	Title	Writer(s)	Length
1.	"This Broken Heart"	William Franklin	4:33
2.	"Baby I Owe You Something Good"	George Clinton	3:50
3.	"Be What You Is"	Clinton	3:45
4.	"I Miss My Baby"	Clarence "Fuzzy" Haskins	5:02
5.	"Rat Kiss the Cat on the Navel"	William "Billy Bass" Nelson, Haskins	7:32
Total length:			24:57

CD bonus tracks
No.	Title	Writer(s)	Length
6.	"Baby I Owe You Something Good" (Mono Single Mix)	Clinton	3:52
7.	"I Miss My Baby" (Mono Single Mix)	Haskins	4:00
Total length:			32:49

== Personnel ==
- Garry Shider – guitar, lead vocals
- Ben Edwards – backing and lead vocals
- Larry Mosson – backing and lead vocals
- Peggie Turner – backing and lead vocals
- Cordell Mosson – bass, backing vocals
- Harvey McGhee – drums
