= John Sauter =

American rock and blues musician and bass guitarist

- Also known as: Polar Bear
- Genres: Rock, blues
- Occupations: Bassist
- Instruments: Bass guitar, guitar
- Labels: Epic; MCA; Musart Media

John Sauter is an American rock and blues musician and bass guitarist from Decatur, Illinois. He has played in Mitch Ryder's band Detroit and with Ted Nugent.

== Life and career ==
John Sauter grew up in Decatur, Illinois, and began playing bass guitar at age 14. He moved to Chicago, and was soon playing with many Chicago blues musicians such as Otis Spann, and Sam Lay, and rock & roll legends Bo Diddley and Chuck Berry, as well as Corky Siegel and the Siegel–Schwall Band.

He moved to Detroit and began playing with John Lee Hooker, along with drummer Muruga Booker, where they were billed as Hooker and Booker. He also began playing at that time with Ted Nugent, an association that lasted many years.

In 1971, he became a member of Mitch Ryder's band Detroit. While in the band, he recruited his friend Steve Hunter to be the guitarist, and they toured with the band and recorded the self-titled album Detroit, which was produced by Bob Ezrin.

Sauter joined the newly reformed band Cactus with Rusty Day in 1976, and played with them for a while. After that project ended, Sauter and Day eventually formed a band called The Pelicans, which featured Sauter on bass, Rusty Day (vocals, harmonica), K.J. Knight (drums, vocals), Steve Dansby (guitar) and Jody Blair (rhythm guitar).

In 1977, he recorded Weekend Warriors with guitarist Ted Nugent, and they toured together for many years.

To celebrate John Lee Hooker's 100th birthday anniversary in 2017, Sauter joined Muruga Booker, Rock & Roll Hall of Fame inductee guitarist J.C. "Billy" Davis, P-Funk guitarist Tony "Strat" Thomas, and singer Misty Love to form the Booker Blues All-Stars, and released a CD called Booker Plays Hooker.

== Discography ==
- Detroit- Detroit (1971)
- Various Artists - Michigan Rocks (1977)
- Ted Nugent - Weekend Warriors (1978)
- Ted Nugent - Out of Control (1993)
- Ted Nugent - Original Album Classics (2008)
- Booker, Dansby, Sauter & Love - The Hand I Was Dealt (2011)
- Booker Blues All Stars - Booker Plays Hooker (2017)

== Awards ==
John Sauter has received a Platinum Record for Weekend Warriors with Ted Nugent.
