= You Shouldn't-Nuf Bit Fish =

Studio album by George Clinton
- Released: December 1983
- Recorded: 1983
- Genres: Funk, dance, rock, R&B, hip hop
- Length: 38:16
- Label: Capitol
- Producer: George Clinton

George Clinton chronology
Computer Games (1982)	You Shouldn't-Nuf Bit Fish (1983)	Some of My Best Jokes Are Friends (1985)

Professional ratings
Review scores
Source	Rating
AllMusic	2.5/5 stars
Philadelphia Inquirer	(favorable)
Rolling Stone	3/5 stars
Stereo Review	(favorable)
Virgin Encyclopedia	4/5 stars
Yahoo! Music	(mixed)
Record Mirror	3/5 stars
The Village Voice	A

You Shouldn't-Nuf Bit Fish is the second studio album by American funk musician George Clinton released in 1983 by Capitol Records. The album reached No. 18 on the Billboard Top Soul Albums chart.

== Overview ==
You Shouldn't-Nuf Bit Fish was produced by George Clinton. You Shouldn't-Nuf Bit Fish expands on the R&B and dance style of Clinton's debut album, Computer Games (1982), and it incorporates elements of rock with a more mainstream sound. The P-Funk live concert tour of 1984 concentrated on the tracks featured on the album.

== Singles ==
"Nubian Nut" reached No. 15 on the Billboard Hot Soul Songs chart. "Last Dance" also peaked at No. 26 on the Billboard Hot Soul Songs chart.

== Track listing ==
Side One
No.	Title	Writer(s)	Length
1.	"Nubian Nut"	George Clinton, David Spradley, Lane Strickland, Fela Kuti	5:59
2.	"Quickie"	Andre Williams, Ron Ford, Janice Evans, Stephanie Linn	6:30
3.	"Last Dance"	William Collins, Robert Johnson, Stephanie Linn	5:30

Side Two
No.	Title	Writer(s)	Length
4.	"Silly Millameter"	Bob Bishop, Lushawn Clinton, Doug Duffy	5:00
5.	"Stingy"	Michael Hampton, Lige Curry, Gary Cooper, Stephanie Linn	6:30
6.	"You Shouldn't-Nuf Bit Fish"	Michael Payne, Robert Johnson, Stephanie Linn	8:47
Total length:			38:16

== Personnel ==
Produced by George Clinton
"Quickie" co-produced by Junie Morrison
"Last Dance" and "You Shouldn't-Nuf Bit Fish" co-produced by Garry Shider

- Junie Morrison, Bootsy Collins, Andre Williams, DeWayne McKnight, Eddie Hazel - guitar
- Michael Hampton - guitar, avatar
- Bootsy Collins, Lige Curry, Michael Payne - bass
- Larry Fratangelo, Muruga Booker - percussion
- Maceo Parker - saxophone
- Richard Griffith, Larry Hatcher - trumpet
- Bootsy Collins - drums
- Junie Morrison, Doug Duffy, David Spradley, DeWayne McKnight, Michael Payne, Ron Cron - synthesizer
- Junie Morrison, Doug Duffy - piano
- Junie Morrison, Doug Duffy, David Spradley, Bernie Worrell, Ron Cron - keyboards
- Fred Wesley - trombone
- George Clinton, Garry Shider, Gary Cooper, Ron Ford, Eddie Hazel, Darryl Clinton, Shirley Hayden, Kim Seay, Lane Strickland, Tracey Lewis, Robert Johnson, Blackbird McKnight, Michael Payne, Andre Williams, Jimmy Giles, Mallia Franklin, James Gilmore, Rev. Uriah - backing vocals

== Charts ==
=== Weekly charts ===
Chart (1984)	Peak position
US Billboard 200	102
US Top R&B/Hip-Hop Albums (Billboard)	18

=== Year-end charts ===
Chart (1984)	Position
US Top R&B/Hip-Hop Albums (Billboard)	47

== Notes ==
- Weisbard, Eric; Craig Marks (1995). Spin Alternative Record Guide. Vintage Books. ISBN 0-679-75574-8.
- Larkin, Colin (1998). Virgin Encyclopedia of R&B and Soul. Virgin Books. ISBN 0-7535-0241-0.
