= Do Fries Go with That Shake? =

Single by George Clinton

Single by George Clinton

from the album R&B Skeletons in the Closet
- B-side: "Pleasures of Exhaustion"
- Released: April 15, 1986
- Recorded: 1986
- Genre: P-Funk
- Length: 5:57 (album version); 10:15 (extended version)
- Label: Capitol; 5558
- Songwriters: George Clinton; Steve Washington; Sheila Washington
- Producers: George Clinton; Steve Washington

George Clinton singles chronology
"Nubian Nut" (1983)	"Do Fries Go with That Shake?" (1986)	"R&B Skeletons (In the Closet)" (1986)

"Do Fries Go with That Shake?" is a song by Parliament-Funkadelic leader George Clinton. The song was released in 1986 by Capitol Records and was originally featured on the album R&B Skeletons in the Closet and was used in the 1997 film Good Burger (in which Clinton made a cameo).

The song was the second highest-charting single of George Clinton's solo career after "Atomic Dog", peaking at number 13 on the Billboard Hot Black Singles chart.

== Music video ==
The music video for this song is an all-African-American variant of Snow White and the Seven Dwarfs, where an evil fast food restaurant boss of Flooky's discovers that one of her fry cooks (George Clinton) is smitten with a beautiful woman he met at a nightclub and becomes jealous. The "fly girl" has also taken her place as "the fairest one of all" according to the magic mirror in the bathroom. In retaliation, when the nightclub beauty and her best friend come to Flooky's to dine and to see George, the boss laces the lady's order of fries with powdered rat poison. The lady takes a bite of the poisoned fries and falls into a deep sleep, sending her into a surreal world where Clinton and the fly girls are trapped inside a large chocolate milkshake and the boss is trying to slurp them up through the straw. Before the dream can continue, the lovely maiden wakes up to George kissing her and breaking the sleeping enchantment.

== Personnel ==
- Vocalists: George Clinton, Sheila Horne
- Bass, Drum Programming, Trumpet, Keyboards: Steve Washington
- Guitars: Andre Williams, DeWayne "Blackbyrd" McKnight
