= Computer Games (album) =

Studio album by George Clinton
- Released: November 5, 1982
- Recorded: 1981–1982
- Studios: The Disc Ltd., East Detroit; United Sound Systems, Detroit
- Genres: Funk, electro-funk
- Length: 40:09
- Label: Capitol
- Producer: George Clinton

George Clinton chronology
Computer Games (1982)	You Shouldn't-Nuf Bit Fish (1983)

Singles from Computer Games
- 1. "Loopzilla" Released: 1982; 2. "Atomic Dog" Released: December 1982

P-Funk collective chronology
The Electric Spanking of War Babies (1981)	Computer Games (1982)	Urban Dancefloor Guerillas (1983)

Professional ratings
Review scores
Source	Rating
AllMusic	4.5/5 stars
Rolling Stone	3/5 stars
The Rolling Stone Album Guide	4/5 stars
Spin Alternative Record Guide	8/10
The Village Voice	A

Computer Games is the debut album by American funk musician George Clinton, released by Capitol Records on November 5, 1982. Though technically Clinton's first "solo" album, the record featured most of the same personnel who had appeared on recent albums by Parliament and Funkadelic, both formally disbanded by Clinton in 1981. Conceived in the aftermath of a period marked by financial and personal struggles for Clinton, Computer Games restored his popularity for a short time before P-Funk fell victim to renewed legal problems and scant label support in the mid-1980s.

According to Glenn Kenny of Trouser Press, after the end of his Parliament-Funkadelic collective, Clinton's album was titled as a "nod to the burgeoning wave of techno-funk that was beginning to overtake almost every other form of dance music; rather than reject the new technology, he adapted it here in his own unique way".

The single "Loopzilla" hit the top 20 of the R&B charts, followed by "Atomic Dog" which reached No. 1 R&B but peaked at No. 101 on the pop chart.

The album was listed by Slant Magazine at #97 on its list of the "Best Albums of the 1980s".

== Track listing ==
Game One
No.	Title	Writer(s)	Length
1.	"Get Dressed" (released as a single-Capitol 5222)	George Clinton, Bootsy Collins	3:39
2.	"Man's Best Friend/Loopzilla" (released as a 12" single-Capitol 8556)	G. Clinton, Garry Shider, Kenneth Gambrell, David Spradley/G. Clinton	12:46
3.	"Pot Sharing Tots"	G. Clinton, Walter Morrison	3:40
Total length:			20:05

Game Two
No.	Title	Writer(s)	Length
1.	"Computer Games"	G. Clinton, Morrison	6:42
2.	"Atomic Dog" (released as a single-Capitol 5201 and 12" single-Capitol 8556)	G. Clinton, Shider, Spradley	4:42
3.	"Free Alterations"	Darryl Clinton, G. Clinton	4:15
4.	"One Fun at a Time"	G. Clinton, Morrison	4:25
Total length:			20:04 40:09

== Personnel ==
- George Clinton
- Guitar: Eddie Hazel, Garry Shider, Junie Morrison, Tony Thomas
- Bass: Bootsy Collins, Junie Morrison
- Keyboards: Bernie Worrell, David Spradley, Junie Morrison, Rahni Harris
- Drums: Dennis Chambers, Jerry Jones
- Percussion: Larry Fratangelo, Muruga Booker
- Horns: Fred Wesley, Larry Hatcher, Maceo Parker, Richard Griffith
- Vocals: Bootsy Collins, Brenda Forman, Brides of Funkenstein, Carmen McGee, Clip Payne, Darryl Clinton, Garry Shider, Gary Mudbone Cooper, George Bunny, Godmoma, Gwendolyn Dozier, Jessica Cleaves, Jessie Driscoll, Jimmy Keaton, Joyce Pearson, Julius Keaton, Junie Morrison, Larry Heckstall, Parlet, Ray Davis, Robert "P-Nut" Johnson, Ron Ford, Tracey Lewis, Trina Frazier, Vanessa Poe, Veronica Faust

Technical

- Recording engineering: David Baker, Mike Iacopelli, John Jaszcz, Tony Ray, Greg Reilly, Jeff Turkin, Jim Vitti, Greg Ward
- Producer - George Clinton, William Collins, Ted Currier, Walter "Junie" Morrison, Gary Shider
- Arrangements: George Clinton, Junie Morrison, Fred Wesley
- Mixing: Greg Reilly, Jim Vitti

== Charts ==
=== Weekly charts ===
Chart (1982–1983)	Peak position
US Billboard 200	40
US Top R&B/Hip-Hop Albums (Billboard)	3

=== Year-end charts ===
Chart (1983)	Position
US Top R&B/Hip-Hop Albums (Billboard)	8
