= The Electric Spanking of War Babies (song) =

- U.S. picture sleeve for the single "The Electric Spanking of War Babies"

Single by Funkadelic

from the album The Electric Spanking of War Babies
- A-side: "The Electric Spanking of War Babies"
- B-side: "instrumental version"
- Released: 1981
- Recorded: 1981
- Genre: P-Funk
- Length: 8:40 (album version); 4:32 (single version)
- Label: Warner Bros. WBS 49667
- Songwriter: George Clinton/Walter Morrison/Barbarella Bishop
- Producers: George Clinton and Walter Morrison

"The Electric Spanking of War Babies" is the title track from the last album recorded by the American funk band Funkadelic. The song was released as a single in 1981 by Warner Bros. Records. Instrumentally the track was constructed by co-writer Walter Morrison. It charted on the Billboard R&B chart, peaking at number 60.

== Personnel ==
- Bass, guitar, drums and keyboards: Walter Morrison
- Lead guitar: Michael Hampton
- Vocals: George Clinton, Walter Morrison, Sly Stone, Parlet
