= T.A.P.O.A.F.O.M. =

T.A.P.O.A.F.O.M. (The Awesome Power of a Fully Operational Mothership)

Studio album by George Clinton and the P-Funk All-Stars
- Released: June 11, 1996
- Genres: R&B, funk, dance, hip hop
- Length: 74:54
- Label: Sony 550
- Producer: George Clinton

George Clinton and the P-Funk All-Stars chronology
| Dope Dogs (1994) | T.A.P.O.A.F.O.M. (The Awesome Power of a Fully Operational Mothership) (1996) | How Late Do U Have 2BB4UR Absent? (2005) |

Professional ratings
Review scores
| Source | Rating |
|---|---|
| Allmusic | 2/5 stars |
| Alternative Press | 4/5 stars |
| Christgau's Consumer Guide | (3-star Honorable Mention) |
| Entertainment Weekly | A− |
| Muzik | 2.5/5 stars |
| Orlando Sentinel | 3/4 stars |
| Q | 3/5 stars |
| Rolling Stone | 2/5 stars |
| Vibe | favorable |
| Yahoo! Music | favorable |

T.A.P.O.A.F.O.M. is a 1996 album by funk musician George Clinton. The title, which is an abbreviation for The Awesome Power of a Fully Operational Mothership, refers to the P-Funk Mothership that was first introduced in 1975 on Parliament's Mothership Connection album. The album was presented as a reunion album because it featured collaborations with former Parliament-Funkadelic members including Bernie Worrell, Bootsy Collins, Junie Morrison, Maceo Parker, and Fred Wesley — some of whom hadn't worked with Clinton in many years. The album also included contributions by current members of the P-Funk All-Stars.

Following the release of T.A.P.O.A.F.O.M., Clinton launched the "Mothership Reconnection Tour" with Bootsy Collins, Bernie Worrell, and the P-Funk All-Stars. The Mothership Reconnection Tour, which began in New York's Central Park, included the landing of a full-scale Mothership on stage, from which Clinton emerged. The artwork for T.A.P.O.A.F.O.M. was unique among P-Funk albums in that it included contributions by all three artists associated with the band: Pedro Bell, Ronald "Stozo the Clown" Edwards, Overton Loyd, and George Clinton. The Japanese version of "T.A.P.O.A.F.O.M." contains an extra track entitled "Secret Love", co-written by Clinton's son Tracey Lewis a.k.a. Trey Lewd. That track was later released in U.S. on the CD How Late Do U Have 2BB4UR Absent?.

== Track listing ==
| No. | Title | Writer(s) | Length |
|---|---|---|---|
| 1. | "If Anybody Gets Funked Up (It's Gonna Be You)" (feat. Erick Sermon & MC Breed) | George Clinton, Jr.; Belita Woods; Gary "Mudbone" Cooper | 4:24 |
| 2. | "Summer Swim" | George Clinton, Jr.; Walter "Junni" Morrison | 5:37 |
| 3. | "Funky Kind (Gonna Knock It Down)" | George Clinton, Jr.; Joseph "Amp" Fiddler; Dwayne "Sa'd Ali" Maultsby; Tracey "Treylewd" Lewis | 5:36 |
| 4. | "Mathematics" | George Clinton, Jr.; Dewayne "Blackbyrd" McKnight | 7:12 |
| 5. | "Hard as Steel" | George Clinton, Jr. | 5:09 |
| 6. | "New Spaceship" (feat. Charlie Wilson) | George Clinton, Jr. | 4:00 |
| 7. | "Underground Angel" | George Clinton, Jr.; Steve "Go Ask Armen" Boyd; Derrick "Frog" Rossen; Mike Wilder | 4:28 |
| 8. | "Let's Get Funky" | George Clinton, Jr.; Joseph "Amp" Fiddler | 5:04 |
| 9. | "Flatman and Bobbin" | George Clinton, Jr.; Ronald Dunbar; Belita Woods; Derrick "Frog" Rossen | 3:31 |
| 10. | "Sloppy Seconds" (feat. Bootsy Collins & Bernie Worrell) | George Clinton, Jr.; William "Bootsy" Collins; Bernie "All The Woo" Worrell; Dewayne "Blackbyrd" McKnight; Belita Woods | 6:59 |
| 11. | "Rock the Party" | George Clinton, Jr.; Olivia Ewing; Thomas "Bubbs" Fiddler; L. Mathew | 3:33 |
| 12. | "Get Your Funk On" | George Clinton, Jr.; Belita Woods; David Spradley | 5:16 |
| 13. | "T.A.P.O.A.F.O.M. (Fly Away)" | George Clinton, Jr.; Debra Barsha; Dwayne "Sa'd Ali" Maultsby | 7:54 |
| 14. | "If Anybody Gets Funked Up (It's Gonna Be You) [Colin Wolfe Mix]" | George Clinton, Jr.; Belita Woods; Gary "Mudbone" Cooper | 6:11 |
| Total length: | | | 74:54 |

== Notes ==
- "Summer Swim" was released as a 12" single, Sony 550 - 46 78391.
- "If Anybody Gets Funked Up (It's Gonna Be You)" was released as an extended remix single, Sony 550 - BSK 7760.
