= The Electric Spanking of War Babies =

Studio album by Funkadelic
- Released: April 14, 1981
- Genre: Funk
- Length: 43:52
- Label: Warner Bros.
- Producer: George Clinton

Funkadelic chronology
| Connections & Disconnections (1980) | The Electric Spanking of War Babies (1981) | By Way of the Drum (2007) |

Singles from The Electric Spanking of War Babies
- 1. "The Electric Spanking of War Babies" Released: 1981; 2. "Shockwaves" Released: 1981

Alternative cover
- Original cover

The Electric Spanking of War Babies is the twelfth studio album by the American funk rock band Funkadelic, released in April 1981 on Warner Bros. Records. The title is an allusion to the Vietnam War and baby boomers. Sly Stone contributed to the recording sessions, singing lead vocals on "Funk Gets Stronger (Killer Millimeter Longer Version)".

== Background ==
Clinton originally planned on a double album, but the idea was quashed by Warner Brothers. The original tracklist featured the instrumental version of the title track found on the 12" single's b-side, as well as the tracks "May Day (S.O.S.)" and "I Angle", later released on the George Clinton Family Series albums Plush Funk and Testing Positive 4 the Funk, respectively. The title refers to the US government's use of media propaganda to promote imperialism and war.

It includes many relative newcomers to P-Funk, many of whom remained employed by George Clinton on future releases under his own name or under the name George Clinton & the P-Funk All-Stars. Of all the original group members since Funkadelic's debut album, only George Clinton, Ray Davis, and Eddie Hazel appear on this album. Junie Morrison plays all the instruments on the title track except the guitar solo which was played by Michael Hampton. This was the last album to feature Eddie Hazel, Ray Davis, Garry Shider, Junie Morrison, Mallia Franklin, and Jessica Cleaves. Also this is the only Funkadelic album the late Roger Troutman appears on as well. Sly Stone performs several instruments and contributed production work to the album.

== Artwork controversy ==
The cover artwork was designed by long-time Funkadelic collaborator Pedro Bell. Deemed inappropriate due to the cover featuring an overtly phallic spaceship that transported a naked woman, the work was edited, despite the fact that Funkadelic "was following up two consecutive million-selling records," while signed to Warner Bros. Bell revised The Electric Spanking of War Babies so the image was featured with a lime-green sketch of shape covering the majority of the cover art, which says, “Oh Look! The Cover that ‘They’ were TOO-SCARED to print!”

== Critical response ==
Professional ratings
Review scores
| Source | Rating |
|---|---|
| AllMusic | 4.5/5 stars |
| Blender | 4/5 stars |
| Christgau's Record Guide: The '80s | A− |
| The New York Times | (mixed) |
| Rolling Stone | 3.5/5 stars |

AllMusic said, "Whether or not one cares to examine its hidden political messages, Electric Spanking is an above-average party album." Robert Christgau stated, "George Clinton reaches into the disgusting depths of his drug-addled mind and comes up with the solidest, weirdest chunk of P-Funk since one nation gathered under a groove."

== Track listing ==
Side One
| No. | Title | Writer(s) | Producer(s) | Length |
|---|---|---|---|---|
| 1. | "The Electric Spanking of War Babies" | Bob Bishop, George Clinton, Junie Morrison | George Clinton, Junie Morrison | 8:37 |
| 2. | "Electro-Cuties" | Jimmy Ali, Clinton, Ron Ford | George Clinton, Ron Ford | 6:10 |
| 3. | "Funk Gets Stronger, Part 1" | Clinton, Michael Hampton | George Clinton, Bootsy Collins, Sly Stone | 6:37 |
| Total length: | | | | 21:24 |

Side Two
| No. | Title | Writer(s) | Producer(s) | Length |
|---|---|---|---|---|
| 1. | "Brettino's Bounce" | Larry Fratangelo | George Clinton | 3:38 |
| 2. | "Funk Gets Stronger (Killer Millimeter Longer Version)" (interpolates "She Loves You" by the Beatles) | Clinton, Sylvester Stewart | George Clinton, Sly Stone | 4:42 |
| 3. | "Shockwaves" | Ron Dunbar, DeWayne McKnight | George Clinton, Ron Dunbar | 5:10 |
| 4. | "Oh, I" | Clinton, Rodney Curtis, Garry Shider | George Clinton, Garry Shider | 4:51 |
| 5. | "Icka Prick" | Clinton, Shider | George Clinton, Garry Shider | 4:07 |
| Total length: | | | | 22:28 43:52 |

== Personnel ==
- George Clinton – lead vocals (on #1–3, 5, 8)
- Junie Morrison – bass, rhythm guitar, keyboards and drums (1)
- Roger Troutman – rhythm guitar, bass and Moog synthesizer (3)
- Michael Hampton (1–3, 7, 8), Jerome Ali (2, 7), Eddie Hazel (5) – lead guitar
- DeWayne McKnight – guitar (6)
- Gordon Carlton – rhythm guitar (2, 7)
- Jimmy Ali (2), Lige Curry (3, 6, 8), Rodney Curtis (7) – bass
- Kenny Colton (2, 6), Tyrone Lampkin (3, 7) – drums
- Larry Fratangelo – percussion (3, 4, 6), drums (4)
- Muruga Booker – electric talking drum (3)
- Marion Saulsby – keyboards (7)
- David Lee Chong – Moog synthesizer and keyboards (8)
- Pat Rizzo (3, 5), Michael Brecker (7) – saxophone
- Cynthia Robinson – trumpet (3, 5)
- Bootsy Collins – vocals (3)
- Tony Thomas – vocals
- Donnie Sterling – lead vocals (6)
- Garry Shider – lead vocals (7), rhythm guitar (7, 8)
- Sly Stone – lead vocals, rhythm guitar, keyboards and drums (5)
