= Plush Funk =

- Japanese pressing of the CD "Plush Funk"

Studio album by George Clinton Family Series
- Released: 1992 (JP release); 1993 (US release)
- Recorded: 1972–1981
- Genre: Funk
- Length: 67:45
- Labels: P-Vine (Japan); Sequel Records (UK); A&M Records (US)
- Producer: George Clinton

George Clinton Family Series chronology
Go Fer Yer Funk (1992)	Plush Funk (1992)	P Is the Funk (1993)

Plush Funk is the second installment of the George Clinton Family Series collection. The album was released in 1992 by P-Vine Records in Japan, and then was released the next year by A&M Records in the United States and Sequel Records in the United Kingdom. The CD features the track "May Day (S.O.S)", which was an outtake from the Funkadelic album "The Electric Spanking of War Babies". The songs themselves feature no vocal involvement by Clinton, instead showcasing the musical talent of other artists.

As with all of the Family Series CD's, the last track features George Clinton supplying background information of all of the songs featured on the CD.

== Track listing ==
Side A
No.	Title	Writer(s)	Length
1.	"May Day (S.O.S.)"	Garry Shider, Linda Shider	5:36
2.	"These Feet Are Made For Dancin'"	Ron Dunbar	4:12
3.	"Booty Body Ready For The Plush Funk"	Donnie Sterling, Dunbar	6:47
Total length:			16:35

Side B
No.	Title	Writer(s)	Length
1.	"I Really Envy The Sunshine"	George Clinton, Tyrone Lampkin	6:32
2.	"Lickety Split"	Fred Wesley	5:44
3.	"Common Law Wife"	G. Clinton	3:43
Total length:			15:59

Side C
No.	Title	Writer(s)	Length
1.	"Superspirit"	Junie Morrison	5:20
2.	"Love Don't Come Easy"	Dunbar	5:56
3.	"I Can't Stand It"	Andre Foxxe, Tracey Lewis, Shider	6:51
Total length:			18:07

Side D
No.	Title	Writer(s)	Length
1.	"Monster Dance"	Ron Ford	2:58
2.	"We're Just Funkers"	Donnie, Dunbar	6:36
3.	"Studio Memories" (Interview)		7:30
Total length:			17:04 67:45

== Personnel ==
May Day (S.O.S)

- Artist: Funkadelic (1981) Producer: George Clinton, Garry Shider
- Drums: Ty Lampkin
- Bass: Rodney "Skeet" Curtis
- Guitar: Gary Shider, Michael Hampton, Cordell Mosson
- Keyboards: David Spradley
- Vocals: Funkadelic, Brides, Parlet, TreyLewd

These Feets Are Made for Dancing (Foot Stranger)

- Artist: Ron Dunbar (1982) Producer: George Clinton, Ron Dunbar
- Drums: Tyrone Lampkin
- Bass: Cordell Mosson
- Guitar: Garry Shider
- Keyboards: Bernie Worrell, David Spradley
- Horns: Horny Horns
- Vocals: Ron Dunbar, Parliament, Brides, Parlet

Booty Body Ready for the Plush Funk

- Artist: Sterling Silver Starship (1980) Producer: George Clinton, Ron Dunbar
- Drums & Bass: Donnie Sterling
- Piano: David Spradley
- Guitar: Tony Thomas, Rodney Crutcher
- Vocals: Donnie Sterling, Ron Dunbar, Parlet, Brides

I Envy the Sunshine

- Artist: Jessica Cleaves (1980) Producer: George Clinton
- Drums: Ty Lampkin
- Bass: Cordell Mosson
- Piano: David Spradley
- Horns: Horny Horns, Brecker Brothers
- Guitar: Brim & Blackbyrd McKnight
- Vocals: Jessica Cleaves, Brandye (Telma Hopkins, Joyce Vincent)

Lickety Split

- Artist: Horny Horns (1979)
- Producer: George Clinton, Bootsy Collins, Fred Wesley
- Drums: Ty Lampkin
- Bass: Bootsy Collins
- Percussion: Larry Fratangelo
- Clavinet: Bernie Worrell
- Fender Rhodes, Sax: Maceo Parker
- Guitar: Michael Hampton
- Trombone: Fred Wesley
- Trumpet: Rick Gardner, Richard "Kush" Griffith

Common Law Wife

- Artist: Flo (1972) Producer: George Clinton
- Drums: Ty Lampkin
- Bass: Cordell "Boogie" Mosson
- Guitar: Gary Shider, Bootsy Collins
- Keyboards: Bernie Worrell
- Horns: Clayton "Chicken" Gunnells, Robert "Chopper" McCullough, Randy Wallace

(This track was also released in 2003 on the Parliament CD reissue Chocolate City (album) with George Clinton as the featured lead vocalist)

Super Spirit

- Artist: Junie Morrison (1978) Producer: George Clinton, Walter Morrison
- Drums, Bass, Electric Piano, Acoustic Piano, Moog Synth: Walter "Junie" Morrison
- Vocals: Junie Morrison

Love Don't Come Easy

- Artist: Brides of Funkenstein (1980) Producer: George Clinton, Ron Dunbar
- Drums, Bass: Donnie Sterling
- Guitar: Tony Thomas, Gordon Carlton
- Keyboard: David Spradley
- Percussion: Larry Fratangelo
- Strings, Horns: David Van De Pitte
- Vocals: Brides

I Can't Stand It

- Artist: Tracey "Trey Lewd" Lewis's Flastic Brain Flam & Andrew Foxxe (1981)
- Producer: George Clinton, Garry Shider
- Drums: Tony Davis
- Bass: Stevie Pannall
- Guitar: Andre "Foxxe" Williams
- Keyboard: David Spradley
- Background Vocals: Parliament, Funkadelic, Brides, TreyLewd,

P.Funk All-Stars

The Monster Dance

- Artist: Ron Ford (1980) Producer: Ron Ford
- Drums: Kenny Colton
- Bass: Jimmy Ali
- Guitar: Jerome Ali
- Keyboard: David Spradley
- Background Vocals: Parlet, Brides, Parliament, Funkadelic

We're Just Funkers

- Artist: Michael Hampton (1980) Producer: George Clinton, Ron Dunbar
- Drums, Bass: Donnie Sterling
- Keyboard, Piano: David Spradley
- Rhythm Guitar: Tony Thomas
- Lead Guitar: Michael Hampton

Studio Memories (Interview)

- George Clinton
