= If Anybody Gets Funked Up (It's Gonna Be You) =

Single by George Clinton & the P-Funk All-Stars

from the album T.A.P.O.A.F.O.M.
- Released: 1996
- Genre: P-Funk
- Length: 4:24
- Label: Epic
- Songwriter(s): George Clinton, Jr.; Belita Woods; Gary "Mudbone" Cooper
- Producer(s): Erick Sermon; George Clinton

George Clinton singles chronology
"Martial Law" (1993)	"If Anybody Gets Funked Up (It's Gonna Be You)" (1996)

"If Anybody Gets Funked Up (It's Gonna Be You)" is a song by the American group George Clinton & the P-Funk All-Stars, released in 1996 as a single from their album T.A.P.O.A.F.O.M..

== Charts ==
Chart (1996)	Peak position
UK Singles (OCC)	97
US Dance Singles Sales (Billboard)	22
US Hot R&B/Hip-Hop Songs (Billboard)	51
