= P Is the Funk =

- Japanese pressing of the CD "P Is The Funk"

Studio album by George Clinton Family Series
- Released: 1993
- Recorded: 1976–1981
- Genre: Funk
- Length: 72:50
- Labels: P-Vine; Sequel Records(UK); AEM Records(US)
- Producer: George Clinton

George Clinton Family Series chronology
Plush Funk (1992)	P Is the Funk (1993)	Testing Positive 4 the Funk (1993)

P Is the Funk is the third installment of the George Clinton Family Series collection. The album was released in 1993 by P-Vine Records in Japan, and then was released later in the same year by AEM Records in the United States and Sequel Records in the United Kingdom. The album contains notable tracks such as the first song ever recorded by the Brides of Funkenstein entitled "Love Is Something" featuring P-Funk lead guitarist Eddie Hazel, as well radio commercials for the Ultra Wave album by Bootsy Collins.

As with all of the Family Series CD's, George Clinton supplies background information of all of the songs featured on the CD (Track 11)

== Track listing ==
Side One
No.	Title	Writer(s)	Length
1.	"Clone Communicado"	George Clinton	3:59
2.	"Does Disc Go With D.A.T. (Simon Says)"	Lonnie Greene, Donnie Sterling, Ron Dunbar	5:41
3.	"Shove On"	Jimmy Giles, Ron Ford, Lige Curry	4:27
4.	"Rock Jam"	Ford	5:11
Total length:			19:18

Side Two
No.	Title	Writer(s)	Length
1.	"Love Is Something"	Jim Callon	6:37
2.	"Every Booty (Get On Down)"	Bootsy Collins, Gary Cooper	5:36
3.	"Personal Problems"	Tracey Lewis, Andre Williams	4:00
4.	"Bubble Gum Gangster"	Ford	3:04
Total length:			19:17

Side Three
No.	Title	Writer(s)	Length
1.	"She's Crazy"	Jerome Ali, Jimmy Ali	5:32
2.	"Think Right"	Ford, G. Clinton, Curry, David Spradley	6:52
3.	"In The Cabin Of My Uncle Jam (P Is The Funk)"	G. Clinton	6:11
Total length:			18:35

Side Four
No.	Title	Writer(s)	Length
1.	"My Love"	Paul McCartney	4:20
2.	"Interview (The Family)"		8:30
3.	"Commercials"		2:50
Total length:			15:40 72:50

== Personnel ==
Clone Communicado

- Artist: Funkadelic (1976) Producer: George Clinton
- Drums: Tiki Fulwood
- Guitar: Garry Shider, Glen Goins, Michael Hampton, Eddie Hazel
- Keyboard: Bernie Worrell
- Vocals: Dr. Funkenstein (Archie Ivy), Ron Ford, Funkadelic

Does Disc Go with D.A.T. (Simon Says)

- Artist: Parliament (1979) Producer: George Clinton, Ron Dunbar
- Drums: Dennis Chambers
- Bass: Donnie Sterling
- Guitar: Gordon Carlton
- Clavinet: Bernie Worrell
- Horns: Horny Horns
- Vocals: Lonnie Greene, Ron Dunbar, Donnie Sterling
- Background Vocals: Parliament, Brides, Parlet

Shove On

- Artist: Jimmy G (1981) Producer: George Clinton, Ron Ford
- Drums: Dean Ragland
- Bass: Jimmy Giles
- Guitar: Ron Ford
- Piano: David Lee Chong
- Fender Rhodes: David Lee Chong
- Lead Vocals: Jimmy Giles
- Background Vocals: Parlet, Ron Ford

Rock Jam

- Artist: Ron Ford (1980) Producer: Ron Ford, George Clinton
- Background Vocals: Brides, Parlet
- Drums: Dean Ragland
- Guitar, Bass: Ron Ford
- Keyboards: David Spradley

Love Is Something

- Artist: Brides of Funkenstein (1977) Producer: George Clinton
- Drums: Tiki Fulwood
- Bass: Billy "Bass" Nelson
- Guitar: Jim Callon, Eddie Hazel
- Clavinet, Synth: Bernie Worrell
- Vocals: Eddie Hazel, Brides of Funkenstein, Jim Callon
- Sax Solo: Darryl Dixon

Every Booty (Get On Down)

- Artist: Parliament (1979) Producer: Bootsy Collins, George Clinton
- Drums: Frankie Waddy
- Bass: Bootsy Collins
- Guitar: Bootsy Collins, Michael Hampton
- Keyboards: Bernie Worrell, Mudbone Cooper
- Clavinet, Organ: Maceo Parker
- Horns: Horny Horns
- Percussion: Larry Fratangelo
- Vocals: Funkadelic

Personal Problems

- Artist: Treylewd (1981) Producer: George Clinton
- Drums: Tony Davis
- Bass: Stevie Pannall
- Guitars: Andre Williams
- Vocals: Tracey Lewis, Andre "Foxxe" Williams

Bubble Gum Gangster

- Artist: Ron Ford (1981) Producer: Ron Ford, George Clinton
- Drums: Man In The Box
- Bass: Ron Ford
- Keyboards: David Spradley
- Guitars: Ron Ford
- Background Vocal: Brides, Parlet

She's Crazy

- Artist: Jerome & Jimmy Ali (1980)
- Guitars: Jerome Ali
- Bass: Jimmy Ali
- Drums: Dennis Chambers

Think Right

- Artist: Parlet & Brides of Funkenstein (1980) Producer: Ron Ford, George Clinton
- Drums: Kenny Colton
- Guitar: Tony Thomas, Michael Hampton
- Keyboards: Nestro Wilson
- Bass: Ron Ford
- Vocals: Parlet

In the Cabin of My Uncle Jam (P Is the Funk)

- Artist: Funkadelic (1979) Producer: George Clinton
- Drums: Kenny Colton
- Bass: Jeff "Cherokee" Bunn
- Guitars: Kevin Oliver, Garry Shider, Michael Hampton, Glen Goins, Eddie Hazel
- Keyboards: Gary Hudgins, Bernie Worrell
- Vocals: Ron Ford, Dr. Funkenstein, Archie Ivey, Nene

My Love

- Artist: Jessica Cleaves (1981) Producer: George Clinton, Ron Dunbar
- Vocals: Jessica Cleaves

Interview

- The Family

Commercials

- George Clinton
- Bootsy Collins
