= Muruga Booker =

American musician (born 1942)

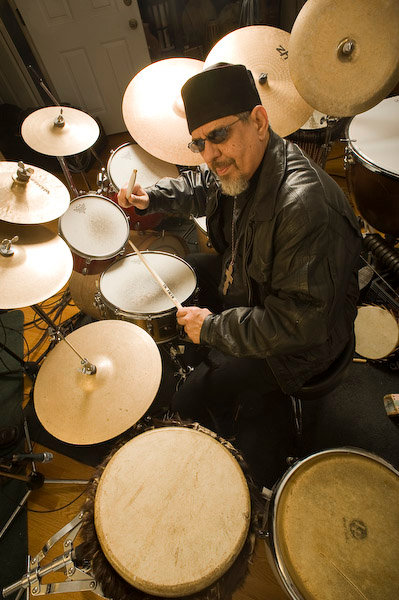

Background information
- Born: Steven Bookvich; December 27, 1942 (age 83); Highland Park, Michigan, U.S.
- Genres: Jazz, rock, ambient, freestyle, funk, folk, new-age, techno
- Occupation: Musician
- Instruments: Drums, percussion
- Years active: 1961–present
- Website: murugabooker.bandcamp.com

Steven Bookvich (born December 27, 1942), known as Muruga Booker, is an American drummer.

== Biography ==
Booker was born in Highland Park, Michigan, on December 27, 1942, at Highland Park General Hospital, and is of Serbian descent. His father, Melvin Bookvich, was a shoemaker who played accordion. He is married to Patti, aka Shakti, and they have a daughter named Rani, and a son named Aaron from a previous marriage. He previously lived in Detroit, New York City and Oakland, California. Since 1985, Booker and his family have lived in Ann Arbor, Michigan, where he has his own recording studio called Sage Ct. Studio.

== Musical career ==
=== 1950s ===
Booker first played the accordion before taking up drums as a preteen. He studied drums under Misha Bichkoff, a Russian music teacher.

=== 1960s ===
He first professionally played drums in 1961 with "The Low Rocks" in Detroit as Steve Booker. Under that name he also achieved local recognition playing in 1962 with the "Thunder Rocks" and both bands released singles on the Sabre Records label, which they also created.

In 1964 he began playing with folk-rock singers Jim & Jean, and also performed on their recordings Changes and People World, which also featured Harvey Brooks on guitar and bass.

In 1964 and 1965, Booker played and recorded with the psychedelic folk rock band The Spike Drivers, and they recorded several songs including Can't Stand The Pain and I'm So Glad.

In 1965 he was asked by Richard Williams to become a member of The Casuals to back up Brenda Lee, and he toured with them for several months all over the USA.

In 1968 he joined the Paul Winter and The Winter Consort, and performed on their album Something in the Wind.

In 1969, at the first Woodstock Festival, he played drums for Tim Hardin, along with cellist Richard Bock, from The Winter Consort. At Woodstock he met Swami Satchidananda who invited him to visit him at the Integral Yoga Institute in New York City, where he gave him the name Muruga. While at the Integral Yoga Institute he became friends with pop artist Peter Max, who also did the artwork for Muruga's 1970 release of Rama Rama/Endless Path, which was also the first recording that Don Was engineered.

=== 1970s ===
In the early 1970s Booker often played with Ted Nugent, who referred to him in an interview as "dangerous and incredible" on drums. A song that was the result of a jam session with Nugent ended up becoming "Stranglehold", which was based around a drum beat and song of Booker's.

In November 1971, he recorded with Allen Ginsberg and Bob Dylan on sessions at The Record Plant, New York, NY, and the resulting recordings were included on several releases by Ginsberg, including First Blues and Ginsberg's box-set release Holy Soul Jelly Roll: Poems & Songs. The engineer on the sessions with Ginsberg and Dylan was Jack Douglas.

In 1971, Muruga met Darius Brubeck, the son of jazz pianist Dave Brubeck, and along with clarinetist Perry Robinson they formed the electronic experimental trio MBR. In 1972, they recorded the album Chaplin's Back which featured reinterpreted music compositions by actor Charlie Chaplin.

In 1973, Muruga joined the Darius Brubeck Ensemble, along with Perry Robinson. At that time, Dave Brubeck decided that he wanted his sons Darius and Chris Brubeck and their bands to tour with him, to open for his band the Dave Brubeck Quartet. Muruga toured as part of the Darius Brubeck Ensemble, along with Perry Robinson, and opened up for, and played alongside the quartet, which gave him the opportunity to play with Dave Brubeck, as well as alongside Gerry Mulligan and Paul Desmond and Alan Dawson. Muruga performed and toured with the band at many high-profile concerts, including an appearance at Carnegie Hall in New York City.

In 1973 and 1974, he recorded with Weather Report on their albums Sweetnighter and Mysterious Traveller.

=== 1980s ===
In the late 1970s and early 1980s Booker lived in New York City and played with David Peel on several projects including "King of Punk" and "Death to Disco". While recording "Junk Rock" with David Peel, Muruga recorded for the first time with the Nada Drum that he invented (it was referred to as an "Electric Talking Drum" on this song).

In 1980 he moved back to Detroit, where he connected with funk legend George Clinton and became an official member of the P-Funk All-Stars. His band at that time, Muruga and the Soda Jerks, with Sly Stone on bass guitar, was recorded and produced by George Clinton and he appeared on many Parliament-Funkadelic and P-Funk All-Stars recordings, and related projects. Booker continues to work with George Clinton and play with the P-Funk All Stars as his schedule allows.

In mid-1985 he moved to Oakland, California, and formed the band Muruga UFM, which included Big Brother and the Holding Company guitarist James Gurley.

In 1989, he recorded with Prem Das on the drum meditation album Journey of the Drums, as well as two other trance drumming recordings, that he released on his Musart record label.

=== 1990s ===
In 1990 he met Merl Saunders and they formed Merl Saunders and the Rainforest Band and recorded with Jerry Garcia, on the album Blues From the Rainforest. They toured to support the album with Steve Kimock on guitar, and John Popper on harmonica, and recorded Fiesta Amazonica, a 2 CD live recording called Save the Planet So We'll Have Someplace to Boogie as well as a live DVD of Blues From The Rainforest.

=== 2000s ===
In 2000, after moving back to Michigan a couple years prior, Booker formed the band Muruga and The Global Village Ceremonial Band, and released the CD One Global Village, featuring P-Funk vocalist Belita Woods and Perry Robinson. They played at several festivals including the Starwood Festival, Rhythm Fest 1 with Mickey Hart, and Rhythm Fest 2 with Airto Moreira. In 2002 his recording company Musart and the Association for Consciousness Exploration co-hosted the SpiritDrum Festival, a tribute to Babatunde Olatunji, also featuring Sikiru Adepoju, Badal Roy, Jeff Rosenbaum, Richie "Shakin'" Nagan, Halim El-Dabh, Perry Robinson, and Jim Donovan of Rusted Root.

In 2003 he began playing and recording with jazz saxophonist Mark Hershberger, and Richard Smith (bass guitar) as the Global Jazz Trio and as a five-piece group called The Global Jazz Project. Muruga no longer performs with The Global Jazz Trio or Global Jazz Project, but continues to record with Hershberger as a duo, or on various projects.

In 2004, Muruga formed the band Free Funk, featuring P-Funk All-Star rapper Louie "Babblin'" Kabbabie and George Clinton's son Tracey Lewis (aka Trey Lewd).

In October 2009, Muruga recorded what would become James Gurley's final recording projects, at his studio in Ann Arbor, Michigan. One of the recordings that resulted was called Big Huge, and was released on limited-edition vinyl by Qbico, in addition to another album with his band Free Funk, called Selfadelic Funk. Big Huge was remixed and remastered in 2016, with more songs included, and released as a digital download on Bandcamp.

=== 2010s ===
In 2010, Muruga Booker and The Rain Forest Band (featuring Badal Roy on percussion, Perry Robinson on clarinet) played at the Detroit Jazz Festival.

In 2013 he formed Muruga & the Cosmic Hoedown Band (Later renamed to Muruga Cosmic Boogie), with Muruga (drums, guitar, and vocals), Shakti Booker (vocals & drums), Parliament Funkadelic member Tony "Strat" Thomas (guitar), Patrick Sarniak (guitar), Benjamin Piner (bass), Douglas Weaver (bass), and Ralph Koziarski (woodwinds, brass & percussion).

In 2012 & 2014 Muruga won a Detroit Music Award for "Outstanding World Music Instrumentalist". In 2014 he won the Detroit Music Award for "Outstanding World Music Recording" for "Joty Drums" by Muruga Booker, Pandit Samar Saha, & John Churchville. Booker has been the recipient of a total of six Detroit Music Awards.

In 2017, in honor of John Lee Hooker's 100th birthday anniversary celebration, he formed Booker Blues All-Stars and recorded a CD with the band called Booker Plays Hooker. The band consists of Muruga (drums), Rock and Roll Hall of Fame inductee Billy Davis (guitar & vocals), Tony "Strat" Thomas(guitar), John Sauter (bass guitar) (who also played with Hooker & Booker), Misty Love (former backup singer for Kid Rock), and special guest Peter "Madcat" Ruth.

== Recording history highlights ==
Through the 1960s, as Steve Booker, he recorded with Jim and Jean on Changes in 1964, and on People World in 1966. He appeared on the Paul Winter Consort's Something in the Wind in 1968, and recorded a meditation record with Swami Satchidananda in 1969. During the 1970s he recorded with Darius Brubeck, Gunter Hampel, Al Kooper, Ursa Major, and with Weather Report. Muruga's band, Muruga and the Soda Jerks, were produced by George Clinton, and he recorded with George Clinton, Funkadelic, Bootsy Collins, and the P-Funk All Stars on many projects, and he is a lifetime member of the P-Funk Family.

In mid-1985 his band Muruga UFM recorded Terroristic Activities 1990 and Rock the Planet 1993. In 1990 he, his wife Shakti, and Prem Das recorded the long-selling Journey of the Drums, a pioneering drum album. That same year, Booker joined Merl Saunders and Jerry Garcia to record the Grammy-nominated album (and subsequent DVD) Blues From the Rainforest, and their live CDs Save the Planet So We'll Have Someplace to Boogie (1992) and Fiesta Amazonica (1998). He also joined Babatunde Olatunji and Sikiru Adepoju to record the CD Cosmic Rhythm Vibrations 1993, which was later remixed in surround sound and distributed on Chesky Records as Circle of Drums in 2005. With his Detroit-based band Free Funk, he recorded the self-titled colored vinyl LP titled Free Funk in 2005 which was released by Qbico Records. This band released the album OrthoFunkOlogy in 2008. Since then he has released several albums on his label Musart, including collaborations with many jazz, funk and World Music artists.

== Discography ==
- 1961 – Low Rocks – Blueberry Jam / Midnight Tears (single)
- 1964 – Jim and Jean – Changes
- 1965 – The Spike Drivers – I'm So Glad and Can't Stand The Pain (singles)
- 1968 – Jim and Jean – People World
- 1968 – Paul Winter Consort – Something in the Wind
- 1971 – Allen Ginsberg and Bob Dylan sessions
- 1972 – Ursa Major – Ursa Major (Dick Wagner)
- 1972 – Darius Brubeck – Chaplin's Back
- 1973 – Weather Report – Sweetnighter
- 1973 – Al Kooper – Naked Songs
- 1974 – Weather Report – Mysterious Traveller
- 1978 – David Peel & Death – King of Punk
- 1978 – Mitch Ryder – How I Spent My Vacation
- 1981 – Funkadelic – The Electric Spanking of War Babies
- 1982 – George Clinton – Computer Games
- 1982 – Godmoma – Here (with Bootsy Collins)
- 1983 – P-Funk All Stars – Urban Dance Floor Guerillas
- 1984 – Muruga & The Soda Jerks – Boogy With You (single)
- 1985 – George Clinton – Some of My Best Jokes Are Friends
- 1989 – Prem Das, Muruga, and Shakti – Journey of the Drums
- 1990 – Merl Saunders and The Rainforest Band – Blues From the Rainforest (with Jerry Garcia)
- 1990 – Muruga – Muruga
- 1992 – Muruga U.F.M. (Unified Field Marshals) – Rock The Planet
- 1993 – Muruga & The Soda Jerks – George Clinton's Family Series: Testing Positive 4 The Funk
- 1993 – George Clinton – Hey Man... Smell My Finger
- 1994 – Sikiru Adepoju, Muruga, Babatunde Olatunji – Cosmic Rhythm Vibrations
- 1994 – Allen Ginsberg – Holy Soul Jelly Roll: Poems & Songs (with Bob Dylan)
- 1995 – P-Funk All Stars – Dope Dogs
- 1995 – Parliament, Funkadelic, P-Funk All Stars Presents With Primal Scream – Police Doggy
- 1995 – P-Funk All Stars – Hydraulic Funk
- 1995 – David Peel & the Lower East Side – Up Against the Wall
- 1998 – Merl Saunders & the Rainforest Band – Fiesta Amazonica
- 1998 – Merl Saunders With His Funky Friends – 'Live!'
- 2003 – Buzzy Linhart – Presents the Big Few
- 2005 – Babatunde Olatunji – Circle of Drums
- 2005 – Global Jazz Trio – Live in Detroit: Global Jazz Trio at Baker's Keyboard Lounge
- 2009 – Global Jazz Project – Out Of This World: Live At The 30th Annual Detroit International Jazz
- 2009 – Peter Walker – Long Lost Tapes 1970
- 2010 – James Gurley & Muruga Booker – Big Huge
- 2011 – David Leikam & Muruga Booker – After the Ice Cream (with John Churchville)
- 2012 – Muruga Booker, Pandit Samir Saha, John Churchville – Joty Drums
- 2013 – Muruga & The Cosmic Hoedown Band – Changing The Sound of Your Room
- 2013 – Woodstock 40 Years On: Back to Yasgur's Farm (with Tim Hardin)
- 2014 – David Leikam & Muruga Booker – Lunar Frequencies / Solar Rhythms
- 2016 – Muruga & The Worms – Muruga & The Worms (with James Gurley)
- 2016 – Wormhole Cafe (feat. P-Funk All-Stars & more) – At The Wormhole Cafe
- 2016 – Muruga Cosmic Boogie – Harmonious World
- 2017 – Muruga Booker – Bio-Harmonic Rhythms
- 2017 – Booker Blues All Stars – Booker Plays Hooker
- 2017 – Muruga & The Global Village Ceremonial Band – Muruga & The Global Village Ceremonial Band (remastered)
- 2018 – Muruga Booker – Within The Within
- 2020 – Muruga Booker – Boom Zoom
- 2021 – Booker & Bridges DaLight – World Jamdemic
- 2021 – Muruga Cosmic Boogie – All Night Long

== Filmography ==
- 1990 – Merl Saunders – Blues From The Rainforest: A Musical Suite Mobile Fidelity Sound Labs
- 2000 – Merl Saunders – Blues From The Rainforest: A Musical Suite
- 2005 – One: The Movie, Circle of Bliss Productions
- 2012 – Groovemonster, Quantum Media Arts
- 2014 – Border City Music Project documentary
- 2022 – Sitting Bull Standing Tall, Media Stream LLC

== Other achievements ==
- In 1984 Booker invented and patented the nada drum, a variation on the talking drum, which was sold through Latin Percussion.
- He is a recipient of the 1991 Hiroshima Voices for Peace award.
- He built and operates his own recording studio, Sage Ct. Studios, and founded his own record label, Musart, which he currently distributes through Bandcamp.
- He has won several Detroit Music Awards.
- He won a "Best of Washtenaw County" Reader's Choice Award.
