= Urban Dancefloor Guerillas =

Studio album by P-Funk All-Stars
- Released: December 1983
- Recorded: 1982–83
- Genre: Funk, dance, R&B
- Length: 39:13
- Label: Uncle Jam/CBS
- Producer: George Clinton, Garry Shider, Sly Stone, Bootsy Collins

P-Funk All-Stars chronology
Urban Dancefloor Guerillas (1983)	Dope Dogs (1994)

Professional ratings
Review scores
Source	Rating
AllMusic	4/5 stars
The Philadelphia Inquirer	(favorable)
Rolling Stone	4/5 stars
Trouser Press	(favorable)
The Village Voice	A−

Urban Dancefloor Guerillas is the debut album of funk band the P-Funk All-Stars, released in 1983 on Uncle Jam Records. The album features an amalgamation of various alumni from the bands Parliament and Funkadelic, both of which were disbanded by 1981. It is the only studio album credited solely to the P-Funk All-Stars, as opposed to other albums that are credited to George Clinton and the P-Funk All Stars. The songs on Urban Dancefloor Guerillas were produced by a variety of members of the P-Funk musical collective including Clinton, Garry Shider, Walter Morrison, Sylvester Stewart (Sly Stone), and Bootsy Collins.

The album was released simultaneously with You Shouldn't-Nuf Bit Fish by George Clinton which was released by Capitol Records. The subsequent P-Funk All-Stars concert tour of 1984 focused on material from both albums. Urban Dancefloor Guerillas was reissued on CD by CBS records in 1989, and then by Sony Records Japan in May 21, 1994, followed by Westbound Records in 1995 under the title Hydraulic Funk (CDSEWD 097). Hydraulic Funk includes the original album plus the 12" remix versions of "Generator Pop" and "Hydraulic Pump". In 2011 Urban Dancefloor Guerillas was reissued by Get On Down, a subsidiary of Sony Music Entertainment. That version contained the 12" versions of Generator Pop and Pumpin It Up (Special Club Mix). The rap rock band Urban Dance Squad named themselves after this album.

== Track listing ==
1. Generator Pop (George Clinton, Garry Shider, David Spradley) - 4:59 (released as a single-CBS Associated Uncle Jam ZS4 04032 then as 12" single CBS Associated 4Z9 04224)
2. Acupuncture (DeWayne McKnight, George Clinton, W. Walters) - 4:21
3. One Of Those Summers (George Clinton, Walter Morrison) - 4:37
4. Catch A Keeper (George Clinton, Donny Sterling, Sylvester Stewart) - 5:46
5. Pumpin' It Up (Garry Shider, G. Shider, Bob Bishop, Ron Ford) - 6:58 (released as a single-CBS Associated Uncle Jam ZS4 04408, then as a 12" single CBS Associated 4Z9 04981)
6. Copy Cat (David Spradley, Lashawn Clinton, Garry Shider) - 5:08
7. Hydraulic Pump (George Clinton, Sylvester Stewart, Jimmy Giles, Ron Ford) - 6:42 (released as a 12" single- Hump Records H-111, then released as the b-side of "Generator Pop")
8. Pumpin' It Up (Reprise) (Garry Shider, G. Shider, Bob Bishop, Ron Ford) - 0:21

== Personnel ==
- Norma Jean Bell
- Muruga Booker
- Greg Boyer
- George Clinton
- Bootsy Collins
- Kenny Colton
- Gary "Mudbone" Cooper
- Benny Cowan
- Janice Evans
- Ron Ford
- Mallia Franklin
- Jimmy Giles
- Richard Griffith

- Michael Hampton
- Larry Hatcher
- Shirley Hayden
- Eddie Hazel
- Sheila Horne
- Robert "P-Nut" Johnson
- Jerry Jones
- Lynn Mabry
- Jeanette McGruder
- DeWayne "Blackbyrd" McKnight
- Walter "Junie" Morrison
- Maceo Parker
- Michael "Clip" Payne

- Dean Ragland
- Garry Shider
- Linda Shider
- David Spradley
- Donnie Sterling
- Sly Stone
- Cynthia Robinson
- Greg Thomas
- Tony Thomas
- Fred Wesley
- Bobby Womack
- Debbie Wright
- Philippé Wynne

Art Direction/Photography: Diem Jones /Back Cover Illustrations: R.Stozo Edwards
