= Weekend Warriors (album) =

- Cover art by Jeff Cummins

Studio album by Ted Nugent
- Released: November 1978
- Recorded: 1978
- Studios: Criteria (Miami); CBS (New York City)
- Genre: Hard rock
- Length: 39:30
- Label: Epic
- Producers: Lew Futterman, Cliff Davies and Tom Werman

Ted Nugent chronology
Double Live Gonzo! (1978)	Weekend Warriors (1978)	State of Shock (1979)

Singles from Weekend Warriors
- 1. "Need You Bad" Released: December 1978

Professional ratings
Review scores
Source	Rating
AllMusic	3/5 stars
Classic Rock	4/5 stars
Collector's Guide to Heavy Metal	7/10
Rolling Stone	(mixed)

Weekend Warriors is the fourth studio album by American hard rock musician Ted Nugent. It was released in November 1978 by Epic Records.

== Description ==
Weekend Warriors was the first of three Ted Nugent studio albums to not feature Derek St. Holmes, following Holmes' departure in 1978. Instead, Charlie Huhn, the new vocalist and guitarist for Nugent, performed on this album and others until Holmes returned for Nugent in 1982. Founding bassist Rob Grange had left for good, citing the lack of credit for co-songwriting and suspicions about Nugent's creative accounting, which Grange alleged was building his hunting dynasty instead of paying the band.

The front sleeve-art was by British artist Jeff Cummins and was originally commissioned by Oui magazine, to accompany an interview with Nugent. Nugent liked what he saw and the artwork was recommissioned by CBS, with additional work being carried out for use as the album sleeve.

== Track listing ==
All songs composed by Ted Nugent.

Side one
No.	Title	Lead vocals	Length
1.	"Need You Bad"	Charlie Huhn	4:19
2.	"One Woman"	Huhn	4:04
3.	"I Got the Feelin'"	Ted Nugent	3:05
4.	"Tight Spots"	Huhn	2:55
5.	"Venom Soup"	Huhn	5:47

Side two
No.	Title	Lead vocals	Length
6.	"Smokescreen"	Huhn	4:15
7.	"Weekend Warriors"	Huhn	3:09
8.	"Cruisin'"	Nugent	3:26
9.	"Good Friends and a Bottle of Wine"	Nugent	4:00
10.	"Name Your Poison"	Nugent	4:30

== Personnel ==
Band members

- Ted Nugent – lead and rhythm guitars, lead vocals (on tracks 3, 8, 9, 10), backing vocals, bass (on track 10), percussion
- Charlie Huhn – lead vocals (on tracks 1, 2, 4, 5, 6, 7, 8), backing vocals, rhythm guitar (on track 2)
- John Sauter – bass (except where noted)
- Cliff Davies – drums, electronic drums, producer

Additional musicians

- David Hull – bass (on tracks 2, 5, 6, 8)

Production

- Lew Futterman, Tom Werman – producers
- Steve Klein – engineer
- Tim Geelan – engineer, mixing
- Kevin Ryan, Lou Schlossberg, Phil Giambaivo – assistant engineers

== Charts ==
Chart (1978)	Peak position
Australia Albums (Kent Music Report)	44
Canada Top Albums/CDs (RPM)	22
US Billboard 200	24

== Certifications ==
Region	Certification	Certified units/sales
Canada (Music Canada)	Platinum	100,000^{^}
United States (RIAA)	Platinum	1,000,000^{^}
^{^} Shipments figures based on certification alone.
