= Greatest Funkin' Hits =

Compilation album by George Clinton
- Released: 29 october, 1996
- Genres: Funk, P-Funk, soul music, R'n'B, hip-hop, electro
- Length: 69:13
- Label: Capitol Records
- Producers: George Clinton, Jonnie Forster

George Clinton chronology
Hey Man, Smell My Finger (1993)	Greatest Funkin' Hits (1996)	Extended Pleasure (2000)

Greatest Funkin' Hits is a compilation of songs and remixes by the American funk music producer George Clinton, released by Capitol Records in 1996.

== Tracklist ==
All tracks are written by George Clinton.

No.	Title	featurings	Length
1.	"Atomic Dog" (Dogs of the World Unite remix)	Coolio	4:22
2.	"Flashlight" (The Groovemasters' mix)	Q-Tip, Busta Rhymes, Ol' Dirty Bastard & P-Funk	6:20
3.	"Booty Body Ready for the Plush Funk"		6:45
4.	"Bop Gun" (One Nation)	Ice Cube	4:47
5.	"Break My Heart" (Stop Tha Bleedin' remix)		5:52
6.	"Mothership Connection: Starchild" (Fully Equipped mix)		7:21
7.	"Knee Deep" (Deep as a Mutha Funker remix)	Digital Underground	4:24
8.	"Hey Good Lookin'" (Booty Enhanced remix)		4:41
9.	"Do Fries Go with That Shake" (Know What I'm Sayin remix)		4:24
10.	"Atomic Dog" (Original Extended Version)		9:58
11.	"Knee Deep" (Midnight mix)	Digital Underground	4:20
12.	"Mothership Connection: Starchild" (The Second Coming)		5:59
Total length:			69:13
