= Go Fer Yer Funk =

- Japanese pressing of the CD "Go Fer Yer Funk"

Studio album by George Clinton Family Series
- Released: October 1992
- Recorded: 1979–1984
- Genre: Funk
- Length: 68:26
- Labels: P-Vine; Sequel Records(UK); AEM Records(US)
- Producer: George Clinton

George Clinton Family Series chronology
Go Fer Yer Funk (1992)	Plush Funk (1992)

Professional ratings
Review scores
Source	Rating
Allmusic	link

Go Fer Yer Funk is the first installment of the George Clinton Family Series collection. The album was released in 1992 by P-Vine Records in Japan, and then was released the next year by AEM Records in the U.S. and Sequel Records in the U.K.. The Family Series was designed to present previously unreleased recordings done by various bands in the Parliament-Funkadelic musical stable. The first CD is notable in that it features the title cut "Go Fer Yer Funk" which originally featured a collaboration between P-Funk and Funk legend James Brown.

The final track on all of the Family Series CDs features commentary from George Clinton on the background of each track. All of the Family Series CDs were also available on limited edition vinyl.

== Track listing ==
Tracks and their order may vary between different releases.

US release
No.	Title	Writer(s)	Length
1.	"Go Fer Yer Funk"	Parliament	9:52
2.	"Funk It Up"	Sterling Silver Starship	8:46
3.	"These Feets Were Made For Dancin' (Foot Stranger)"	Ron Dunbar	4:12
4.	"Send a Gram"	Jessica Cleaves	5:32
5.	"Who in the Funk Do You Think You Are?" (Demo)	Sly Stone	1:33
6.	"Better Days"	Andre Foxx	4:10
7.	"The Chong Show"	Bootsy Collins	4:10
8.	"Michelle"	Flastic Brain Flam	12:24
9.	"Sunshine of Your Love"	Funkadelic	5:33
10.	"Storytime With George "The Archeological Dig"" (re-titled "Papa George's Rap" in Japan and "Interview" in the UK)		12:14
Total length:			68:26

== Personnel ==
Go Fer Yer Funk

- Artist: Parliament (1981) Producer: George Clinton
- Featuring: Funkadelic, Bootsy Collins, Horny Horns, James Brown

Funk It Up

- Artist: Sterling Silver Starship (1981) Producer: George Clinton, Ron Dunbar
- Lead Vocals, Bass, Drums: Donny Sterling
- Keyboard: Jerome Rogers, Donny Sterling
- Guitar: Rodney Crutcher, Tony Thomas
- Background Vocals: Parlet, Mahlia Franklin, Ron Dunbar

These Feets Were Made For Dancin' (Foot Stranger)

- Artist: Ron Dunbar (1982)
- Producer: George Clinton, Ron Dunbar
- Percussion/Drums: Tyrone Lampkin
- Bass: Cordell "Boogie" Mosson
- Guitar: Gary Shider
- Keyboard: Bernie Worrell, David Spradley
- Horns: Horny Horns
- Lead Vocals: Ron Dunbar
- Background Vocals: Parliament, Brides Of Funkenstein, Parlet

Send A Gram

- Artist: Jessica Cleaves (1980–81) Producer: George Clinton
- Vocals: Jessica Cleaves
- Drums: Ty Lampkin
- Bass: Danan Potts
- Keyboard: David Spradley
- Guitar: Cordell Mosson, Ron Bremby
- Background Vocals: Andre Williams, Tracey Lewis, George Clinton,
- Sidney Barnes, Robert Johnson
- Horn & String Arrangements: Bernie Worrell

Who in the Funk Do You Think You Are?

- Artist: Sly Stone (1981)
- Piano, Bass, Guitar, Vocals: Sly Stone
- Guitar: Ron Ford

Better Days

- Artist: Andre Foxxe (1984) Producer: George Clinton, Garry Shider
- Vocals: Andre Foxxe
- Guitar: Marvin Williams
- Keyboard: David Spradley
- Background Vocals: Marvin Williams, Garry Shider

The Chong Show

- Artist: Bootsy Collins (1979–80) Producer: George Clinton, Bootsy Collins
- Keyboards, Bass, Guitar, Lead Vocals: Bootsy Collins
- Keyboards, Background Vocals: David Spradley
- Percussion: Carl "Butch" Small

Michelle

- Artist: Treylewd's Flastic Brain Flam (1978–79) Producer: George Clinton
- Guitar: Tracey Lewis, DeWayne McKnight, Garry Shider
- Drums: Dennis Chambers
- Bass: Jeff "Cherokee" Bunn
- Keyboard: Gary Hudgins
- Vocals: Tracey Lewis
- Background Vocals: Kevin Shider, Andre Foxxe, Tracey Lewis, Patricia Curry, Garry Shider, Linda Shider, Brides, Parlet, Ray Davis, Parliament, Funkadelic, Bootsy's Rubber Band, Steve Pannel, Robert Johnson, Tony Lafoot, Jessica Cleaves

Sunshine of Your Love

- Artist: Funkadelic (1984) Producer: George Clinton
- All instruments by: DeWayne "Blackbyrd" McKnight
