= A Fifth of Funk =

- Japanese pressing of the CD "A Fifth Of Funk"

Studio album by George Clinton Family Series
- Released: July 1993
- Recorded: 1972–1981
- Genres: Funk, soul, dance
- Length: 77:03
- Labels: P-Vine; Sequel Records (UK); AEM Records (US)
- Producer: George Clinton

George Clinton Family Series chronology
Testing Positive 4 the Funk (1993)	A Fifth of Funk (1993)	The Best (1995)

Professional ratings
Review scores
Source	Rating
Allmusic	2/5 stars
Virgin Encyclopedia of Popular Music	3/5 stars

A Fifth of Funk is the fifth and final installment of the George Clinton Family Series collection by Parliament-Funkadelic collective members. The album was released in Japan in 1993 by P-Vine Records, and later in the same year by AEM Records in the United States and Sequel Records in the United Kingdom. The compilation's producer and P-Funk leader George Clinton gives his final thoughts about the tracks on the album, as well as his feelings on the entire Family Series project, for A Fifth of Funk's final track. The title is a play on words of Beethoven's Symphony No. 5, as well as Walter Murphy's 1976 disco hit "A Fifth of Beethoven".

== Track listing ==
Side A
No.	Title	Length
1.	"Flatman And Bobin"	8:12
2.	"I Didn't Know That Funk Was Loaded (Count Funkula)"	5:25
3.	"Thumparella (Oh Kay)"	3:46
Total length:		17:23

Side B
No.	Title	Length
1.	"Eyes Of A Dreamer"	3:49
2.	"I Found You"	4:36
3.	"Ice Melting In Your Heart"	5:18
4.	"Clone Ranger"	5:55
Total length:		19:38

Side C
No.	Title	Length
1.	"Who Do You Love"	5:02
2.	"Up Up Up And Away"	4:33
3.	"Can't Get Over Losing You"	6:42
Total length:		16:17

Side D
No.	Title	Length
1.	"Rat Kissed The Cat"	6:26
2.	"Too Tight For Light"	5:00
3.	"Every Little Bit Hurts"	7:19
4.	"Interview "The Final Thought""	5:00
Total length:		23:45 77:03

== Personnel ==
Song credits for A Fifth of Funk adapted from album liner notes.

1. "Flatman and Bobin"
  - Artist: Parliament (1978) Producer: George Clinton
  - Drums: Tyrone Lampkin
  - Bass: Bootsy Collins
  - Keyboards: Bernie Worrell
  - Guitars: Garry Shider
  - Horns: Horny Horns
2. "Count Funkula (I Didn't Know That Funk Was Loaded)"
  - Artist: Lonnie Greene (1980) Producers: Ron Dunbar, Lonnie Greene
  - Drums: Lonnie Greene
  - Bass: Donnie Sterling
  - Guitars: Tony Thomas
3. "Thumparella (Oh Kay)"
  - Artist: Ron Ford (1981) Producer: Ron Ford
4. "Eyes of a Dreamer"
  - Artist: Jessica Cleaves (1981) Producer: Ron Dunbar
5. "I Found You"
  - Artist: Phillippe Wynne (1981) Producer: Phillippe Wynne, Ron Dunbar
  - Background Vocals: Brandie (Telma Hopkins, Joyce Vincent)
6. "Ice Melting in Your Heart"
  - Artist: Brides of Funkenstein (1977) Producer: Ron Dunbar
  - Drums: Tyrone Lampkin
  - Bass: Junie Morrison
  - Guitars: Junie Morrison, Garry Shider
  - Keyboards: Bernie Worrell
7. "Clone Ranger"
  - Artist: Trey Lewd's Flastic Brain Flam (1978)
  - Producers: Gary Shider, George Clinton
  - Drums: Tony Davis
  - Bass: Stevie Pannall
  - Guitars: Garry Shider, DeWayne McKnight
  - Background Vocals: Brides, Parlet
8. "Who Do You Love"
  - Artist: Bernie Worrell (1978) Producers: Bernie Worrell, George Clinton
  - Drums: Tyrone Lampkin
  - Bass: Rodney 'Skeets' Curtis
  - Percussion: Larry Fratangelo
  - Keyboards: Bernie Worrell
  - Guitars: Gary Shider
9. "Up Up Up and Away"
  - Artist: Brides of Funkenstein (1979) Producer: Ron Dunbar
  - Drums: Jerry Jones
  - Bass: Rodnick Chandler
  - Guitars: Eddie Willis
  - Keyboards: Rudi Robinson, Bernie Worrell
10. "Can't Get Over Losing You"
  - Artist: Junie Morrison (1978) Producer: Junie Morrison
  - All instruments by Junie Morrison
11. "Rat Kissed the Cat"
  - Artist: George Clinton and Brides of Funkenstein (1977) Producer: George Clinton
  - Drums: Tiki Fullwood
  - Bass: Billy Bass
  - Guitars: Gary Cooper, Garry Shider
  - Keyboards: Bernie Worrell
  - Horns: Horny Horns
12. "Too Tight for Light"
  - Artist: Funkadelic (1979) Producer: George Clinton, Junie Morrison
13. "Every Little Bit Hurts"
  - Artist: George Clinton, Diane Brooks, & Funkadelic (1972)
  - Producer: George Clinton
14. "Interview - Final Thoughts"
  - George Clinton

== General references ==
- Colin Larkin (1998). Virgin Encyclopedia of R&B and Soul. Virgin Books. ISBN 0-7535-0241-0.
