= Atomic Dog =

1982 single by George Clinton

- US picture sleeve

Single by George Clinton

from the album Computer Games
- B-side: "Loopzilla", "Man's Best Friend"
- Released: December 1982
- Recorded: 1982
- Genre: Funk; electro
- Length: 4:15 (7-inch single version); 4:42 (LP and instrumental versions); 10:00 (Atomic mix)
- Label: Capitol
- Songwriters: George Clinton; Garry Shider; David Spradley
- Producers: George Clinton; Ted Currier

George Clinton singles chronology
"Loopzilla" (1982)	"Atomic Dog" (1982)	"Nubian Nut" (1983)

Music video
- "Atomic Dog" on YouTube

"Atomic Dog" is a song by American musician George Clinton, released by Capitol Records in December 1982, as the second and final single from his studio album, Computer Games (1982). It became the P-Funk collective's last to reach #1 on the U.S. R&B Chart. The single failed to chart on the Billboard Hot 100 although it has attained a level of stature since then, partly due to having been sampled in several hip hop songs.

== History ==
George Clinton's P-Funk reached its commercial and conceptual height during the late 1970s after the release of Mothership Connection in 1975 and a series of spectacular concert tours. During these years the group became entangled in internal dissension, legal disputes, and creative exhaustion. Clinton responded by dissolving Parliament and Funkadelic and signed with Capitol Records to make a solo album, although with support from other P-Funk artists.

After other members of the group laid down a drum track, Clinton was brought to the studio to record the vocals. He was heavily intoxicated and had only a general idea of making a song about a dog. Whether by accident or intentionally, the group started playing the track in reverse and Clinton proceeded to ad lib the vocals in two takes. The group added secondary drums, synths, backing vocals and panting sounds to complete the song.

The song's music video, directed by Peter Conn, depicts a young man playing an arcade game about dogs, which is shown first in computer graphics and animation, and then in live action on a multi-colored dance set.

== Critical reception ==
"Atomic Dog" became the P-Funk collective's last single to reach #1 on the U.S. R&B chart, displacing Michael Jackson's "Billie Jean." It is regarded a classic in black popular music. The song's music video was nominated for two Billboard Video Music Awards, one for best special effects, and another for best art direction. However, the video lost to Billy Joel's "Pressure" and Herbie Hancock's "Rockit", respectively.

== Charts ==
Chart (1983)	Peak position
UK Singles Chart	94
U.S. Billboard Hot Black Singles	1
U.S. Billboard Bubbling Under Hot 100	1

== In popular culture ==
“When I created Atomic Dog in 1982, I had no idea how it would’ve connected to Omega Psi Phi. Now that I’m a part of this iconic brotherhood, it is only right to celebrate the only funkin’ way I know how.”

— George Clinton

"Atomic Dog" is considered the unofficial theme song of the fraternity Omega Psi Phi. Fraternity brothers are "known to take over any space, anytime, anywhere when 'Atomic Dog' is being played."

The song has been included in trailers and TV spots for many films (many dog-related), including 101 Dalmatians, 102 Dalmatians, Rugrats Go Wild, Hotel for Dogs, The Shaggy Dog, Finn on the Fly, Legally Blonde 2: Red, White & Blonde, The Fresh Prince of Bel-Air, Boomerang, Menace II Society, Trolls World Tour, Turner & Hooch, and Joe Dirt. The song also appears in a 2019 TV commercial for Etrade and briefly in the 2001 film See Spot Run.

== Copyright lawsuit ==
"Atomic Dog" was the subject of Bridgeport Music, Inc. v. UMG, Inc., et al. (Case No. 07-5596, 6th Cir. 2009), a lawsuit filed in 2007 by Bridgeport Music, the holders of the composition rights to "Atomic Dog" against Universal Music Group and the producers of "D.O.G. in Me", a song recorded by the R&B and hip-hop group Public Announcement and included on their 1998 album, All Work, No Play. In its complaint, Bridgeport claimed that "D.O.G. in Me" infringed its copyright by repeating the phrase, "Bow wow wow, yippie yo, yippie yea" and the sound of rhythmic panting throughout the song, and by repeating the word "dog" in a low tone of voice at regular intervals as a form of musical punctuation. A jury found that the defendants had willfully infringed Bridgeport's rights and awarded statutory damages of $88,980. In a November 2009 decision affirming the lower court ruling, Circuit Judge Martha Craig Daughtrey of the U.S. Court of Appeals for the Sixth Circuit described the circumstances surrounding the creation of "Atomic Dog":

Songwriters David Spradley, Garry Shider and George Clinton created "Atomic Dog" in a recording studio in January 1982, working without a written score... Testimony at trial indicated that the song was composed spontaneously – Spradley recorded the initial tracks in the studio and recalled that "when George arrived he had been partying pretty heavily so he was, you know, feeling pretty good," and was unsteady at the microphone. Spradley and Garry Shider "got on either side of him. We just kind of kept him in front of the microphone" while Clinton recorded the vocal tracks that same night... Testimony by David Spradley... also demonstrated that Clinton exercised some degree of creative control over the panting by instructing the performers to create a certain rhythm.

The court further described the "Bow Wow refrain" as the best-known aspect of the song – "in terms of iconology, perhaps the functional equivalent of 'E.T. phone home'" – and held that the jury did not act unreasonably in concluding that there was substantial similarity between the two works.

== Bibliography ==
- Bulmer, John. Devil Music: Race, Class, and Rock And Roll. Troy, New York: Russell Sage College Press.
- Friedman, Ted. "Making it Funky: The Signifyin(g) Politics of George Clinton's Parliafunkadelicment Thang." 1993.
- Vincent, Rickey. Funk: The Music, The People, and the Rhythm of One. New York: St. Martin's Press, 1996. ISBN 0312134991.
