= Garry Shider =

American musician and guitarist

- Shider in 1978, as part of the Funkentelechy tour.

Background information
- Also known as: Diaper Man; Starchild; Cholly
- Born: Garry Marshall Shider; July 24, 1953; Plainfield, New Jersey, U.S.
- Died: June 16, 2010 (aged 56) Greater Upper Marlboro, Maryland, U.S.
- Genres: Funk; psychedelic soul; R&B
- Occupation: Musician
- Instruments: Guitar; vocals
- Years active: 1971–2010
- Formerly of: Parliament-Funkadelic

Garry Marshall Shider (July 24, 1953 – June 16, 2010) was an American musician and guitarist. He was musical director of the P-Funk All-Stars for much of their history. He was inducted into the Rock and Roll Hall of Fame in 1997, with fifteen other members of Parliament-Funkadelic.

== Early life ==
Shider was born in Plainfield, New Jersey. At the age of ten and under the guidance of his father Jesse, Garry and his brothers played and sang behind many gospel artists of the time including legends such as Shirley Caesar, The Five Blind Boys, The Mighty Clouds of Joy, and others. As a youth Shider was also a regular customer at the Plainfield barbershop owned by George Clinton, where the future members of Parliament would sing doo-wop for customers and counsel local youngsters. Clinton made note of the young Shider's talents on guitar and his ability with gospel singing.

By the time he was sixteen, Shider wished to escape the crime and dead-end prospects of Plainfield, so he and his friend Cordell "Boogie" Mosson left for Canada where Shider married and had a son. Shider and Mosson formed a funk/rock band called United Soul, or "U.S.". George Clinton was living in Toronto at the time and began hearing about United Soul from people in the local music business, and took the band under his wing upon learning that Shider was a member.

== Career ==
In 1971, Clinton produced several tracks by United Soul with input from members of Funkadelic. The songs "I Miss My Baby" and "Baby I Owe You Something Good" were released as a one-off single by Westbound Records in 1971 under the group name U.S. Music with Funkadelic. All the tracks recorded with Clinton in 1971 were released by Westbound in 2009 as the album U.S. Music With Funkadelic. After producing United Soul, Clinton then invited Shider and Mosson to join Parliament-Funkadelic. Two United Soul songs were rerecorded on later Funkadelic albums with Shider as a member. Clinton groomed Shider for an important role in the P-Funk roster, which Shider joined full-time in 1972. He was a prominent contributor to albums by both Parliament and Funkadelic until the dissolution of those two bands in the early 1980s, after which he continued to work regularly with Clinton's P-Funk All-Stars.

During Parliament-Funkadelic performances, Shider was known for appearing in a diaper, making him instantly recognizable on stage and earning him the nickname "Diaper Man". Shider is featured prominently in many hit songs like "Cosmic Slop," "Getten' to Know You," and "One Nation Under a Groove". He co-wrote many noteworthy Parliament-Funkadelic songs, and he made important contributions to P-Funk spin-off acts including Bootsy Collins and Eddie Hazel.

Shider has been featured in Guitar Player Magazine three times, and once in the Japanese version. He has been featured in Who's Who in Music and appeared on a compilation album by Paul Shaffer of the David Letterman band, and also on rock group The Black Crowes' 1996 album Three Snakes and One Charm. Shider has also appeared on Saturday Night Live several times, the Late Show with David Letterman, The Arsenio Hall Show, New York Undercover, The Tonight Show, and others. He appeared in the films PCU and The Night Before; both of which included songs he wrote and performed. He has also had songs featured in the film Bad Boys, with Sean Penn, as well as being the recipient of several Grammy nominations for songs like "Stomp" by Kirk Franklin, which used "One Nation Under a Groove" as its musical inspiration. The song won Song of the Year at the GMA Dove Awards.

Shider released a solo single in 1988 entitled "Beautiful". The attempt to reconcile P-Funk's distinct sound with that of late-80s synthpop yielded no chart success. He released two full albums in 2002, Diaper Man, The Second Coming and Diaperman Goes Starchild.

Shider was inducted into the Rock and Roll Hall of Fame in 1997 as a prominent member of Parliament-Funkadelic.

== Death ==
In 2010, it was announced that Shider was suffering from cancer of the brain and lungs. On June 16, 2010, Shider died from complications of his cancer at his home in Greater Upper Marlboro, Maryland. He is survived by his wife, Linda Shider, a singer/songwriter, and his two sons.

== Awards ==
- 1998 Dove Gospel awards for Song of the Year, "Stomp"
- Who's Who in Music, 1978
- Grammy nominee 1997, 1978
- Rock and Roll Hall of Fame, 1997
