= George Clinton (funk musician) =

American musician (born 1941)

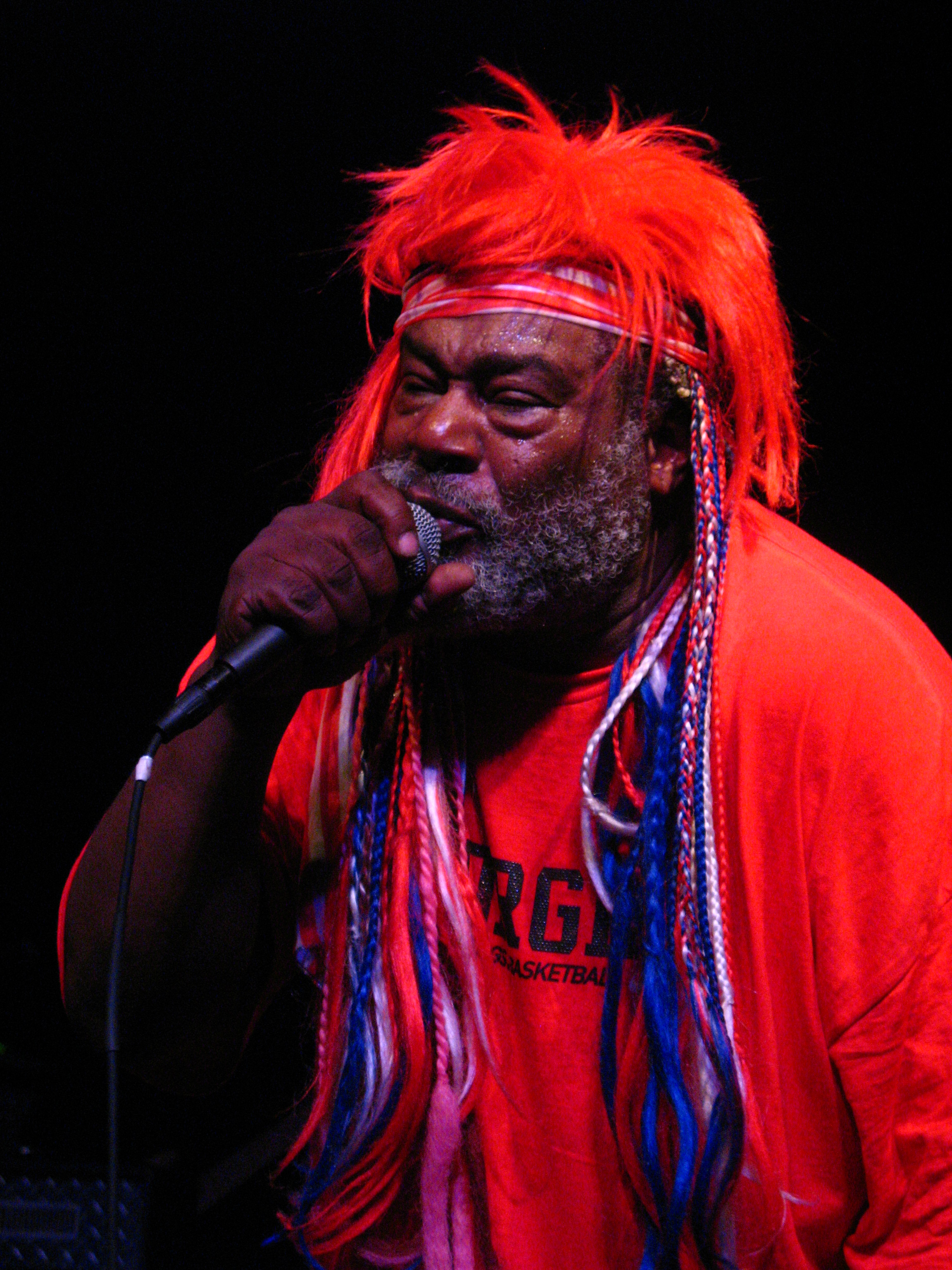
- Clinton performing in 2007

Background information
- Born: George Edward Clinton; July 22, 1941 (age 85); Kannapolis, North Carolina, U.S.
- Origin: Plainfield, New Jersey, U.S.
- Genres: Funk; psychedelic funk; electro-funk; avant-funk; progressive soul
- Occupations: Singer; songwriter; record producer; bandleader
- Instrument: Vocals
- Works: With Parliament; with Funkadelic
- Years active: 1955–present
- Labels: Westbound; Revilot; Capitol; EMI; Paisley Park; Warner Bros.; 550; Epic; SME; Shanachie; Brainfeeder
- Member of: Parliament-Funkadelic
- Formerly of: Parliament; Funkadelic; Bootsy's Rubber Band
- Website: georgeclinton.com

George Edward Clinton (born July 22, 1941) is an American singer, songwriter, record producer, and bandleader. His Parliament-Funkadelic collective (which primarily recorded under the distinct band names Parliament and Funkadelic) developed an influential and eclectic form of funk music during the 1970s that drew on Afrofuturism, outlandish fashion, psychedelia, and surreal humor. He launched his solo career with the 1982 album Computer Games and went on to influence 1990s hip-hop and G-funk.

Clinton is regarded, along with James Brown and Sly Stone, as one of the foremost innovators of funk. He was inducted into the Rock and Roll Hall of Fame in 1997, alongside 15 other members of Parliament-Funkadelic. In 2019, he and Parliament-Funkadelic were given Grammy Lifetime Achievement Awards.

== Early life ==
George Edward Clinton was born in Kannapolis, North Carolina, grew up in Plainfield, New Jersey, and as of 2026 has lived in Tallahassee, Florida for 32 years. During his teen years, Clinton formed a doo-wop group inspired by Frankie Lymon & the Teenagers called the Parliaments, while straightening hair at a barbershop in Plainfield, New Jersey. Clinton is color blind. In a conversation with artist Amadour, Clinton stated, "I see light gray, dark gray, black, and white. I can feel the tones and shades, just like dogs. I was a barber at one point. So I know how to fade in more ways than just looking at the colors. I can fade just from the shapes of things and their feeling. I started trying to intellectualize it, writing it down and thinking how do you do this?" The West End of Plainfield was once home to a barbershop on 216 Plainfield Avenue known as "Silk Palace". Owned in part by Clinton, it was staffed by various members of Parliament-Funkadelic, and known as the "hangout for all the local singers and musicians" in Plainfield's 1950s and 1960s doo-wop, soul, rock, and proto-funk music scene.

== Career ==
=== 1960s and 1970s ===
For a period in the 1960s Clinton was a staff songwriter for Motown. Despite initial commercial failure and one major hit single ("(I Wanna) Testify" in 1967), as well as arranging and producing scores of singles on many of the independent Detroit soul music labels, the Parliaments eventually found success under the names Parliament and Funkadelic in the 1970s (see also P-Funk). These two bands combined the elements of musicians such as Jimi Hendrix, Sly and the Family Stone, Frank Zappa, and James Brown while exploring various sounds, technology, and lyricism. Clinton and Parliament-Funkadelic dominated Black music during the 1970s, with more than 40 R&B hit singles (including three number ones) and three platinum albums.

From 1971 to late 1973, Clinton and several other members of the band settled in Toronto. During their years in Toronto, they honed their live show and recorded the album America Eats Its Young, which was their first to feature Bootsy Collins.

=== 1980s ===
In the 1980s, Clinton began to encounter legal difficulties arising from PolyGram's acquisition of Parliament's label, Casablanca Records. He recorded several solo albums, although all of these records featured contributions from P-Funk's core musicians. This period of Clinton's career was marred by multiple legal problems resulting in financial difficulties due to royalty and copyright issues, notably with Bridgeport Music, who Clinton claims fraudulently obtained the copyrights to many of his recordings.

In 1982, Clinton was signed to Capitol Records under two names: his own as a solo artist, and as the P-Funk All-Stars, releasing Computer Games under his own name that same year. The single "Loopzilla" hit the Top 20 on the R&B charts, followed by "Atomic Dog", which reached number one R&B and number 101 on the pop chart. In the next four years, Clinton released three more studio albums (You Shouldn't-Nuf Bit Fish, Some of My Best Jokes Are Friends, and R&B Skeletons in the Closet) as well as a live album, Mothership Connection (Live from the Summit, Houston, Texas) and charting three singles in the R&B Top 30, "Nubian Nut", "Last Dance", and "Do Fries Go with That Shake?"

He is also a notable music producer who works on almost all the albums he performs on, and has produced albums for Bootsy Collins and Red Hot Chili Peppers, among others. In 1985, he was recruited by the Chili Peppers to produce their album Freaky Styley, because the band members were huge fans of his and of funk in general. Clinton wrote the vocals and lyrics to the title track, which was originally intended by the band to be left as an instrumental piece. The album was not a commercial success at the time. In 1987, Clinton was recruited to write the theme song for The Tracey Ullman Show, "You're Thinking Right".

During the mid to late 1980s, many hip-hop and rap artists cited Clinton's earlier music as an influence. Along with James Brown, Clinton's songs with Parliament-Funkadelic were often sampled by rap producers. "Sure, sample my stuff…" he remarked in 1996; "Ain't a better time to get paid than when you're my age. You know what to do with money. You don't buy as much pussy or drugs with it – you just buy some." In 1989, Clinton released The Cinderella Theory on Paisley Park, Prince's record label.

=== 1990s to 2000s ===
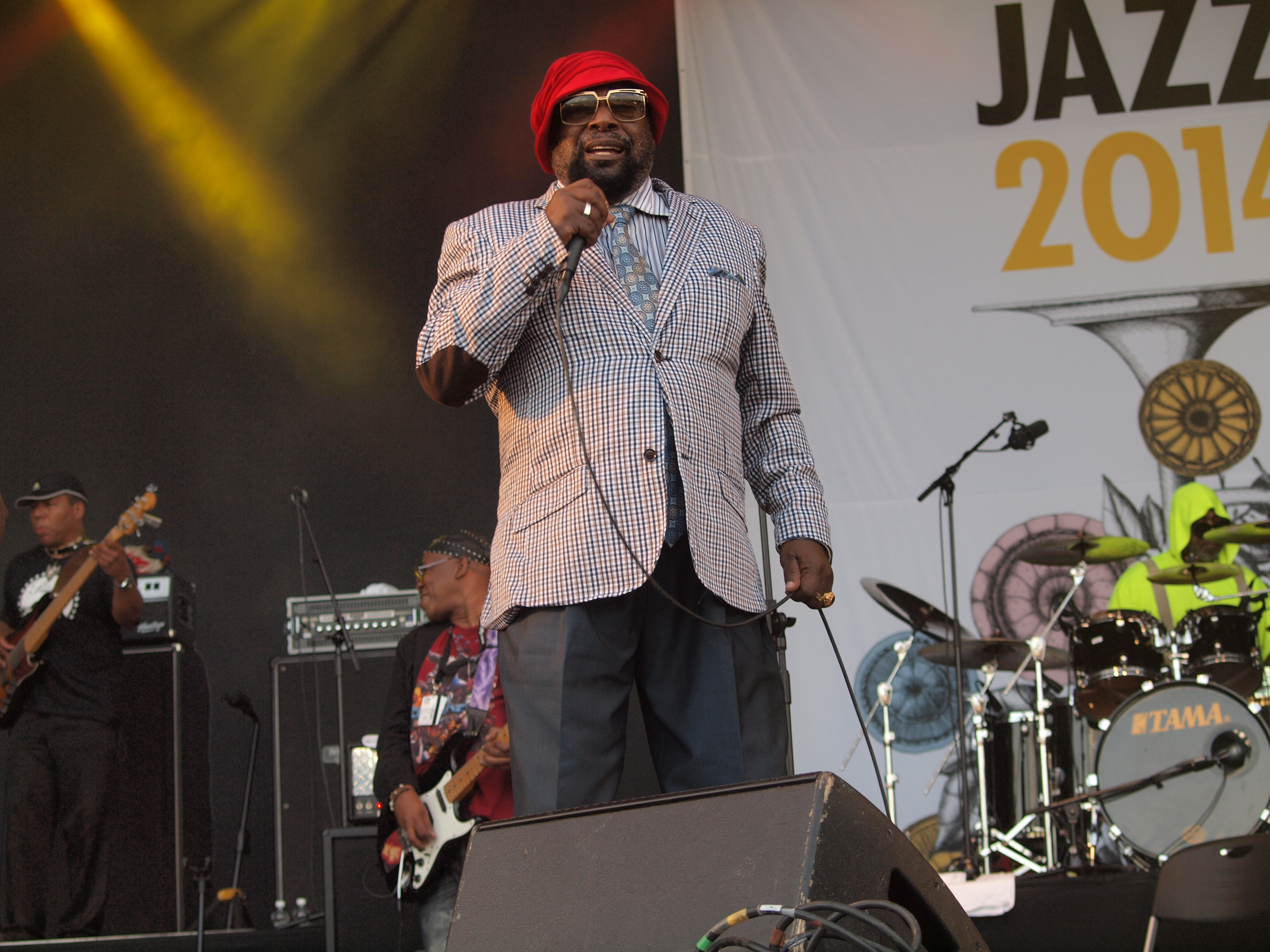
Clinton performing with Parliament-Funkadelic at Pori Jazz 2014 in Finland

Clinton continued his work with Paisley Park with Hey, Man, Smell My Finger in 1993. The year 1994 saw Clinton contribute to several tracks on Primal Scream's studio album Give Out But Don't Give Up. In 1995, Clinton sang "Mind Games" on the John Lennon tribute Working Class Hero. Clinton then signed with Sony 550 and released T.A.P.O.A.F.O.M. (The Awesome Power of a Fully Operational Mothership) in 1996.

Clinton appeared in films such as Graffiti Bridge (1990), House Party (1990), PCU (1994), Good Burger (1997), and The Breaks (1999). In 1994, he appeared as the host of the anthology television film Cosmic Slop. In 1997, he appeared as himself in the Cartoon Network show Space Ghost Coast to Coast. Clinton also appeared as the voice of the Funktipus, the DJ of the funk radio station Bounce FM in the 2004 video game Grand Theft Auto: San Andreas, in which his song "Loopzilla" also appeared.

Rapper Dr. Dre sampled most of Clinton's beats, in order to help and create his own G-funk music era. Displaying his influence on rap and hip-hop, Clinton also worked with Tupac Shakur on the song "Can't C Me" from the album All Eyez on Me; Ice Cube on the song and video for "Bop Gun (One Nation)" on the Lethal Injection album (which sampled Funkadelic's earlier hit "One Nation Under a Groove"); Outkast on the song "Synthesizer" from the album Aquemini; Redman on the song "J.U.M.P." from the album Malpractice; Souls of Mischief on "Mama Knows Best" from the album Trilogy: Conflict, Climax, Resolution; Killah Priest on "Come With me" from the album Priesthood; the Wu-Tang Clan on "Wolves" from the album 8 Diagrams.

Clinton founded a record label called The C Kunspyruhzy in 2003. He had a cameo appearance in "Where Were We?", the season two premiere of the CBS television sitcom How I Met Your Mother, on September 18, 2006. He appeared on the intro to Snoop Dogg's Tha Blue Carpet Treatment album, released in 2007. Clinton was also a judge for the 5th annual Independent Music Awards. On September 16, 2008, Clinton released a solo album, George Clinton and His Gangsters of Love, on Shanachie Records. Largely a covers album, Gangsters features guest appearances from Sly Stone, El DeBarge, Red Hot Chili Peppers, RZA, Carlos Santana, gospel singer Kim Burrell and more. On September 10, 2009, Clinton was awarded the Urban Icon Award from Broadcast Music Incorporated. The ceremony featured P-Funk associate Bootsy Collins, as well contemporary performers such as Big Boi from Outkast and Cee-Lo Green from Goodie Mob. Also in 2009, Clinton was inducted into the North Carolina Music Hall of Fame.

=== 2010s to 2020s ===
On March 7, 2010, Clinton voiced a colorful blob alien version of himself in T-Pain's Adult Swim television movie Freaknik: The Musical. In May 2012, Clinton was awarded an Honorary Doctorate of Music from Berklee College of Music. During the commencement concert, Clinton joined the college's P-Funk Ensemble to perform hits like "Testify," "Give Up the Funk," and "One Nation Under a Groove". He was accompanied by longtime horn players Bennie Cowan and Greg Thomas. Clinton was a guest star in Odd Future's television show Loiter Squad on Adult Swim in 2013.

On June 27, 2015, Clinton joined Mark Ronson, Mary J. Blige and Grandmaster Flash on stage at the Glastonbury Festival to perform Ronson's hit "Uptown Funk". Clinton also appears with Kendrick Lamar on the song "Wesley's Theory" from the album To Pimp a Butterfly. In March 2017, Clinton appeared on the Adult Swim television series FishCenter Live. The Outline's Samuel Argyle described it as "[t]he episode that makes the most cohesive narrative sense."

Clinton and Parliament-Funkadelic were slated to headline the seventh annual Treefort Music Fest in Boise, Idaho in 2018. The release of a new Parliament album, Medicaid Fraud Dogg, was announced in March 2018. It was released May 22, 2018. In April 2018, Clinton announced that he would retire from touring in May 2019. Billboard reported that Clinton had recently had a pacemaker implanted, but he said that was not a factor in his decision. He indicated that he expected Parliament-Funkadelic would continue to tour without him, saying "Truth be told, it's never really been about me. It's always been about the music and the band. That's the real P-Funk legacy. They'll still be funkin' long after I stop." Earlier in 2018, he told Rolling Stone that he had made a hologram, suggesting that the band could "have it start performing in Vegas". Clinton would un-retire a few years later.

In December 2018, the Recording Academy announced that Clinton and Parliament-Funkadelic would be given Lifetime Achievement Awards. The awards were presented on May 11, 2019. Clinton collaborated with Flying Lotus on his new album Flamagra released on May 24, 2019. The track "Burning Down the House" was co-written by Clinton. On June 26, 2019, Clinton was named as a honoree by the National Museum of African American Music.

Clinton also provided the voice of King Quincy, leader of the funk trolls, in the 2020 animated film Trolls World Tour. In 2022, Clinton competed in season eight of The Masked Singer as "Gopher". After being eliminated on "Hall of Fame Night" alongside George Foreman as "Venus Fly Trap", Clinton did a performance of "Give Up the Funk (Tear the Roof Off the Sucker)" while backed up by Sheila E., Nick Cannon, and Robin Thicke. He also exhibited paintings and sculptures in a solo show at Jeffrey Deitch Gallery in Los Angeles with artist Lauren Halsey. On January 19, 2024, Clinton received a star on the Hollywood Walk of Fame. On March 11, 2025, Clinton filed a $100 million lawsuit against Armen Boladian, Bridgeport Music, Westbound Records, Nine Records, Southfield Music and Eastbound Records.

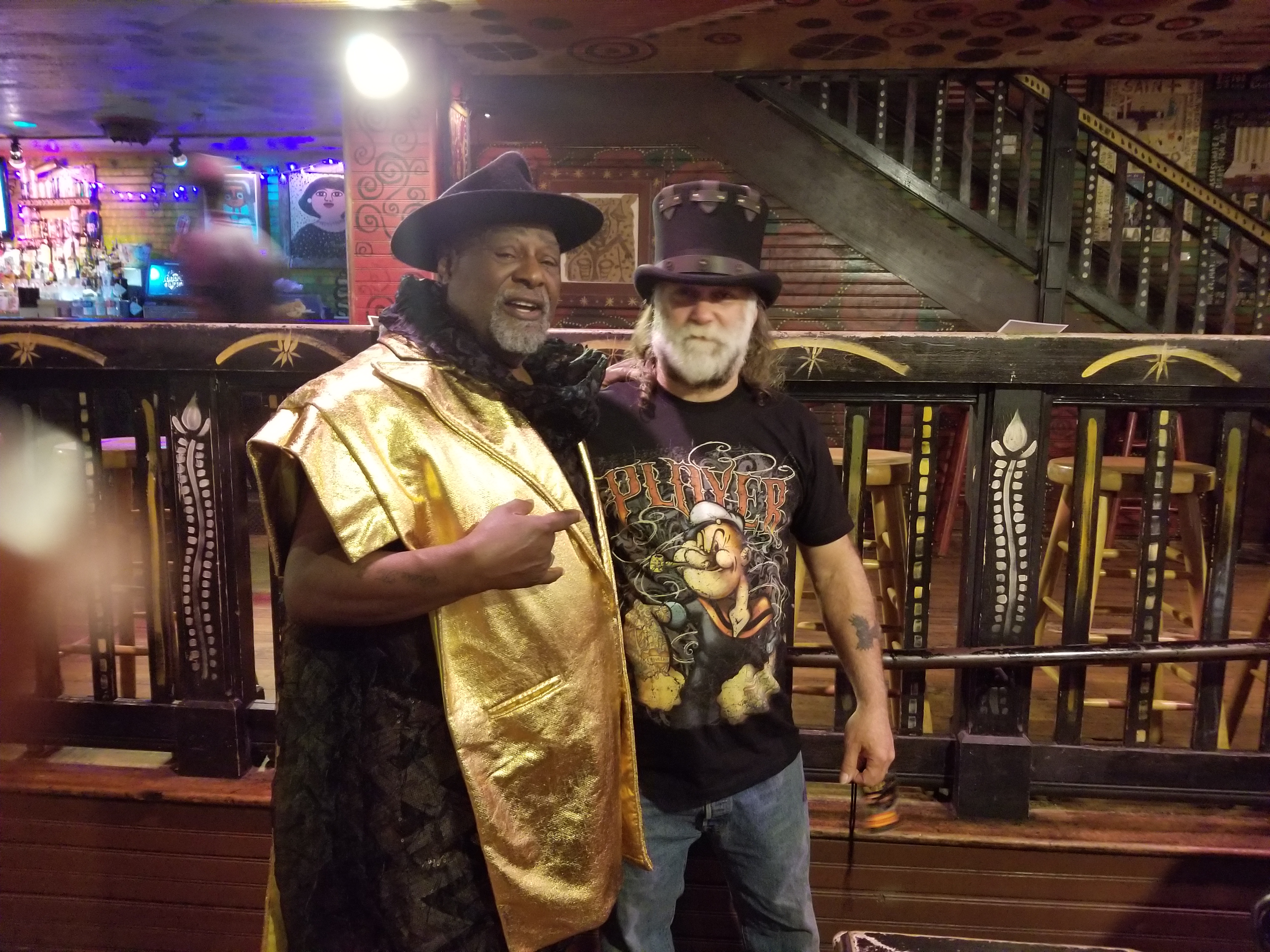
George hanging out with his friend The Lord Of Funk - Orlando 2018

In June 2025, Clinton was inducted into the Songwriters Hall of Fame

== Personal life ==
Carol Hall was Clinton's first wife. They had several children, including Donna, George III, Darryl, and Lushawn Clinton. Clinton married Stephanie Lynn Clinton in 1990. In February 2013, after 22 years of marriage, he filed for divorce. He is now married to Carlon Thompson-Clinton, his manager of more than 10 years.

On February 1, 2010, Clinton's son George Clinton Jr. was found dead in his Florida home. According to police, he died of natural causes and had been dead for several days.

Clinton was inducted as an honorary member of Omega Psi Phi on July 30, 2020, and received an honorary Doctor of Humane Letters from Clinton College in Rock Hill, South Carolina, on May 3, 2024.

Clinton claims to have witnessed unidentified anomalous phenomena. In an interview with The Last Podcast on the Left, he said that he and Bootsy Collins were driving to his home from a studio when they saw flying metallic objects, one of which hit their car. He described the object as "like mercury" and could not explain the sighting because "we weren't even high".

== Discography ==
=== Studio albums ===
Year	Album information	Peak chart positions	
Year	Album information	US	US R&B
1982	Computer Games: Released: Label: Capitol Records; Format:	40	3
1983	You Shouldn't-Nuf Bit Fish: Released: Label: Capitol Records; Format:	102	18
1985	Some of My Best Jokes Are Friends: Released: Label: Capitol Records; Format:	163	17
1986	R&B Skeletons in the Closet: Released: Label: Capitol Records; Format:	81	17
1989	The Cinderella Theory: Released: Label: Paisley Park Records; Format:	192	75
1993	Hey, Man, Smell My Finger: Released: Label: Paisley Park Records; Format:	145	31
1994	Dope Dogs: Released: Label: XYZ; Format:	—	—
1996	T.A.P.O.A.F.O.M.: Released: Label: Sony 550 Music; Format:	121	27
2005	How Late Do U Have 2BB4UR Absent?: Released: September 6, 2005; Label: The C Kunspyruhzy; Format: CD	—	—
2008	George Clinton and His Gangsters of Love: Released: September 16, 2008; Label: Shanachie; Format: CD	—	34
"—" denotes releases that did not chart.

=== Live albums ===
Year	Album information
1976	The Mothership Connection – Live from Houston: Released: Label: Capitol Records; Format:
1990	Live at the Beverly Theater: Released: Label: Westbound Records; Format:
1995	Mothership Connection Newberg Session: Released: Label: P-Vine; Format:
2004	500,000 Kilowatts of P-Funk Power (Live): Released: Label: Fruit Tree; Format:
2006	Take It to the Stage (Live): Released: Label: Music Avenue; Format:
2015	P-Funk Live at Metropolis: Released: July 31, 2015; Label: Metropolis; Format: Vinyl, CD, DVD

=== Compilations ===
Year	Album information
1996	Greatest Funkin' Hits: Released: 1996; Label: Capitol Records; Format: CD, LP, cassette

=== Family Series albums ===
Year	Title	Label
1992	Go Fer Yer Funk	Nocturne
1992	Plush Funk	Nocturne
1993	P Is the Funk	Nocturne
1993	Testing Positive 4 the Funk	AEM
1993	A Fifth of Funk	AEM
1995	The Best (compilation)	P-Vine

=== EPs ===
Year	Album information
1988	Atomic Clinton! (EP): Released: Label: Capitol Records; Format:
1990	Atomic Dog (EP): Released: Label: Capitol Records; Format:

=== Solo singles ===
Year	Title	Peak chart positions			Album
Year	Title	US R&B	US Dance	UK	Album
1982	"Loopzilla"	19	48	57	Computer Games
1982	"Atomic Dog"	1	38	94	Computer Games
1983	"Nubian Nut"	15	—	—	You Shouldn't-Nuf Bit Fish
1986	"Do Fries Go with That Shake?"	13	—	57	R&B Skeletons in the Closet
1986	"R&B Skeletons (In the Closet)"	—	—	—	R&B Skeletons in the Closet
1989	"Why Should I Dog You Out?"	—	—	—	The Cinderella Theory
1989	"Tweakin'"	—	—	—	The Cinderella Theory
1993	"Paint the White House Black"	—	—	—	Hey Man, Smell My Finger
1993	"Martial Law"	—	—	—	Hey Man, Smell My Finger
1996	"If Anybody Gets Funked Up (It's Gonna Be You)" (as George Clinton & the P-Funk All-Stars)	13	—	97	T.A.P.O.A.F.O.M.
"—" denotes releases that did not chart.

=== Contributions ===
- 1981: "Work That Sucker to Death" (Xavier featuring George Clinton and Bootsy Collins; Point of Pleasure)
- 1983: "I Almost Believed You" (from the Michael Bolton album Michael Bolton)
- 1985: "American Ghost Dance" (sang backing vocals with the Red Hot Chili Peppers on their album Freaky Styley; he also produced this album)
- 1985: "May the Cube Be With You" (collaborated with Thomas Dolby and appeared in the music video for the song)
- 1985: "Sun City" (from the Artists United Against Apartheid album Sun City)
- 1986: "Break My Heart" (Jimmy G. & the Tackheads; one of his many one-off groups with George Clinton supplying vocals & possibly Bootsy Collins on bass)
- 1986: "Magilla Gorilla" (from the Kurtis Blow album Kingdom Blow)
- 1988: "Lifestyles of the Roach and Famous by the INCorporated Thang Band (Produced by George Clinton and Bootsy Collins. Songs co-wrote by George Clinton)
- 1990: "We Can Funk" (from the Prince album Graffiti Bridge)
- 1990: House Party (George Clinton, as himself)
- 1991: "Ju Ju Man (Rock the Planet)", "Dysfunktion", "Air Head", and "Freedom of Speech" (from the Muruga UFM album Rock the Planet)
- 1991: "Sons of the P" (from the Digital Underground album Sons of the P)
- 1991: "Words & Music from da Lowlands" (from the Gotcha! album Words and Music from da Lowlands)
- 1993: "G-Funk Intro" (from the Snoop Doggy Dogg album Doggystyle)
- 1993: "Tight" (from the MC Breed album The New Breed)
- 1994: PCU (George Clinton, as himself)
- 1993: "Bop Gun (One Nation)" (from the Ice Cube album Lethal Injection)
- 1994: "P-Funk" (NBA Jam; hidden character)
- 1994: "Funky Jam", "Give Out But Don't Give Up" and "Free" (from the Primal Scream album Give Out But Don't Give Up)
- 1995: "Blac Mermaid" (from the Society of Soul album Brainchild)
- 1996: "Can't C Me" (from the 2Pac album All Eyez on Me)
- 1997: Good Burger (Mental Patient/Dancer)
- 1998: "Synthesizer" (from the Outkast album Aquemini)
- 1999: "Get Naked" (Methods of Mayhem ft. Lil' Kim, Fred Durst and Mix Master Mike from the album Methods of Mayhem)
- 2000: "Alien Love" (from the Alien Lovestock album Planet of the Fish)
- 2001: "Come With Me", "The One" (from the Killah Priest album Priesthood)
- 2001: "Speed Dreaming" (from the Warren G album The Return of the Regulator)
- 2001: "J.U.M.P." (from the Redman album Malpractice)
- 2002: "The Movie" (from the Too Short album What's My Favorite Word?)
- 2003: "Hey Bulldog" (from the Eric McFadden album Diamonds To Coal)
- 2005: "Lotus Flower" (from the Blackalicious album The Craft)
- 2006: "Uncle Speaks (Album Naration)" (from the Joi album Tennessee Slim Is the Bomb)
- 2006: "Intrology" (from the Snoop Dogg album Tha Blue Carpet Treatment)
- 2006: "The Doctor and the Kidd" (from the People Under the Stairs album Stepfather)
- 2007: "Wolves" and "Tar Pit" (from the Wu-Tang Clan album 8 Diagrams)
- 2007: "When the World Is at Peace" (Masters of Funk & Blues feat. George Clinton & Bobby Taylor; A Soulful Tale of Two Cities)
- 2007: "Love Won't Let Me Wait" (Masters of Funk, Soul & Blues featuring George Clinton; A Soulful Tale of Two Cities)
- 2007: "Night Out" (from the Lifesavas album Gutterfly)
- 2008: "Up Again" (from the Bobby Digital album Digi Snacks)
- 2008: "Hitler's Brain" (from the Die Warzau album Vinyl88: Not the Best of Die Warzau)
- 2009: "There's a Party" (from the N.A.S.A album The Spirit of Apollo)
- 2010: "Fo Yo Sorrows" (from the Big Boi album Sir Luscious Left Foot: The Son of Chico Dusty)
- 2010: "Red Wine" & "Red Wine (Skit)" (from the Stevie Stone album New Kid Comin)
- 2011 The Big Ol' Nasty Getdown (Appears on the Beauty of Pretty, Amplify, I Will Wait for You, It's So Hard to Go & Room 2012) on The Big Ol' Nasty Getdown - Volume 1 album (Getdown Entertainment)
- 2011: "D-Funk (Funk With Us)" (from the Headhunters album Platinum)
- 2012: Thanksgiving Day halftime show at Ford Field, Detroit, Michigan; Halftime Concert featuring Kid Rock)
- 2013: "Tonight We Ride" (from the Killah Priest album The Psychic World of Walter Reed)
- 2013: "Do the Damn Thang" (from the Ralph Myerz album Supersonic Pulse)
- 2015: "Wesley's Theory" (from the Kendrick Lamar album To Pimp a Butterfly)
- 2015: "The Lavishments of Light Looking" (from the Adult Swim Singles Program 2015 by WOKE)
- 2016: "Do the Damn Thang" (Da YoungFellaz single featuring Snoop Dogg & Nipsey Hussle)
- 2016: "Riot" (from the Childish Gambino album "Awaken, My Love!")
- 2018: "Hawking Tribute" (George Clinton & Funky Taurus; pays tribute to the passing of Stephen Hawking)
- 2018: "Highway" (new version by George Clinton & Funky Taurus)
- 2019: "Burning Down the House" (from the Flying Lotus album Flamagra)
- 2019: "Feed the Wolf" (Miss Velvet and the Blue Wolf feat. George Clinton; guesting on 4 tracks)
- 2021: "Groove for the Ques" (Willie Bradley & George Clinton)
- 2021: "Funk Aspirin" (Cimafunk & George Clinton)
- 2021: "UFO Le Funk" & "Brooklyn UFO" from the 2014 Funky Taurus & George Clinton album UFO Le Funk)
- 2022: "Benny's Got a Gun" (BLK ODYSSY & Benny the Butcher & George Clinton)
- 2022: "She's a Flirt" (Incidents & West Coast Stone & George Clinton)
- 2023: "Up is Just A Place" (Smudge All Stars feat. George Clinton) (From the 2020 album Smudge All Stars)
- 2023: "Headache" (Smudge All Stars feat. George Clinton) (From the 2020 album Smudge All Stars)
- 2023: "Lazy Daisy" (George Clinton & Funky Taurus; from the Lazy Daisy album 2019 Lazy Daisy George Clinton & Funky Taurus)
- 2023: "All the Parties" (Drake feat. Chief Keef and George Clinton; uncredited) (From the 2023 album For All the Dogs)
- 2025: "Last Call in America" (from the 2025 Fishbone album, Stockholm Syndrome)
- 2025: "Space Cow Initiation Ritual" (from the 2025 Dance Gavin Dance album, Pantheon)
- 2026: "Petal Rock Black" (Willow Smith feat. George Clinton; from the 2026 WILLOW album Petal Rock Black)
- 2026: "Dirty Nation" (D12 feat. George Clinton; from the 2026 D12 album D12 Forever Vol. 1)

== Filmography ==
=== Film ===
Year	Title	Role	Notes
1988	The Night Before	Rat's Nest Band	
1990	House Party	D.J.	
1990	Graffiti Bridge	George	
1994	PCU	Himself	
1997	Good Burger	Dancing Crazy	
1998	Butter	Celebrity Guest #1	
2017	Kuso	Doctor Clinton	
2020	Trolls: World Tour	King Quincy	Voice role
2023	Good Burger 2	Himself	

=== Television ===
Year	Title	Role	Notes
1986	Saturday Night Live	Himself - Musical Guest	Episode: "Anjelica Huston and Billy Martin/George Clinton"
1997	Space Ghost Coast to Coast	Himself	Episode: "Untitled"
1997	Martin	Himself	Episode: "California, Here We Come - Part 2"
2004	The Bernie Mac Show	Himself	Episode: "Go Bernie, It's Your Birthday"
2006	How I Met Your Mother	Himself	Episode: "Where Were We?"
2010	Freaknik: The Musical	Alien George Clinton	Voice role; television special
2013	The Cleveland Show	Himself	Voice role; Episode: "When a Man (or a Freight Train) Loves His Cookie"
2013	Loiter Squad	Himself	Episode: "Boyz in da Hood"
2022	The Masked Singer U.S.	Himself	3 episodes
2023	Agent Elvis	Himself	Voice role; Episode: "Maghrebi Mint"

=== Video games ===
Year	Game	Role	Notes
2004	Grand Theft Auto: San Andreas	Bounce FM DJ "The Funktipus" (voice)	
2021	Grand Theft Auto: The Trilogy - The Definitive Edition	Bounce FM DJ "The Funktipus" (voice)	Archival recordings Remaster of Grand Theft Auto: San Andreas only

== Books ==
- Clinton, George; Ben Greenman (2014). Brothas Be, Yo Like George, Ain't That Funkin' Kinda Hard on You?. New York: Atria Books. ISBN 978-1-4767-5107-8.

== See also ==
- Album era
