= List of P-Funk members =

Since the late 1950s, Parliament-Funkadelic and the associated P-Funk musical collective, often referred to as the "Funk Mob," have included a large number of musicians and singers. While some of their contributions have gone uncredited, the following individuals and bands contributed to various P-Funk projects; most of them have been credited on at least one album.

Of the more than 201 members listed, the sixteen whose names are shown in bold italics were inducted into the Rock and Roll Hall of Fame as members of Parliament-Funkadelic in 1997. Three other listed members have been inducted separately: Sly Stone, was inducted into the Hall in 1993 as the leader of Sly and the Family Stone; Bobby Womack, who was inducted in 2009; and Philippé Wynne, who was posthumously inducted in 2024 as a member of The Spinners.

== A ==
- Jerome Ali(1981) - guitar
- Jimmie Ali(1981) - bass
- Gene "Poo Poo Man" Anderson - vocals
- Mickey Atkins - organ
- Donald Austin - guitar

== B ==
- Tinker Barfield
- Jeff Bass(1993) - bass
- Mark Bass(1993) - bass
- Harold Beane - guitar
- Chris Beasly - guitar
- Danny Bedrosian - keyboards
- Pedro Bell - artwork (sometimes credited as Captain Draw)
- Henry Benefield - vocals
- Muruga Booker - percussion
- Taka Boom (Taka Khan) - vocals
- Langston Booth - drums
- Frankie Boyce - guitar
- Richard Boyce - bass
- Steve Boyd - vocals
- Greg Boyer - trombone
- **Jerome "Bigfoot" Brailey** - drums
- Michael Brecker - saxophone
- Randy Brecker - trumpet
- Gary Bronson - drums
- Ron Bykowski - guitar
- Jeff "Cherokee" Bunn - bass

== C ==
- Jimi Calhoun - bass
- Sammy Campbell - vocals
- Gordon Carlton - guitar
- Dennis Chambers - drums
- Barry Chenault - drums
- Jessica Cleaves - vocals
- **George Clinton** - band leader, keyboards, vocals, songwriter, producer
- Lushawn "Young Poppi" Clinton - rapper
- Scottie Clinton - vocals
- Tra'zae Clinton - rapper
- Phelps "Catfish" Collins - guitar
- **William "Bootsy" Collins** - bass, vocals, drums, guitar, songwriter, producer
- Kenny Colton - drums
- Sonny Cool - Guitar
- Gary "Mudbone" Cooper - vocals
- Ruth Copeland - vocals
- Lawrence Glenn "Flip" Cornett - guitar, bass
- Bennie Cowan - trumpet
- Benjamin "Benzel" Cowan - drums
- Andy "Shanktown" Cruickshank - vocals
- Star Cullars - bass
- Lige Curry - bass
- Guy Curtis - drums
- Rodney "Skeet" Curtis - bass

== D ==
- Derrick Davis - bass, vocals
- **Ray "Stingray" Davis** - vocals
- Gregory Deanda - bass
- Darryl Dixon - saxophone
- Defiance Douglass - vocals, keyboards, songwriter, producer
- Gwen Dozier - vocals
- Ron Dunbar - vocals

== E ==
- Stozo "the Clown" Edwards - artwork
- Janice Evans - vocals

== F ==
- Victoria Falconer - vocals, theremin
- Joseph "Amp" Fiddler - keyboards
- Greg Fitz - keyboards
- Ron Ford - vocals
- Kendra Foster - vocals
- Cynthia Franklin - vocals
- Mallia Franklin - vocals
- Larry Fratangelo - percussion
- Scott "Skyntyte" Free - guitar, vocals
- **Ramon "Tiki" Fulwood** - drums

== G ==
- Rick Gardner - trumpet
- Michael Gatheright - vocals
- Andre Giles - guitar
- Jimmy Giles
- Cynthia Girty - vocals
- **Glenn Goins** - vocals, guitar
- Kevin Goins
- Lonnie Green - drums, vocals
- Richard "Kush" Griffith - trumpet
- Clayton "Chicken" Gunnells - trumpet

== H ==
- **Michael "Kidd Funkadelic" Hampton** - guitar
- Steven Hammond - drums
- Wil Harris - guitar, vocals
- **Clarence "Fuzzy" Haskins** - vocals, guitar, drums
- Nowell Haskins - vocals
- Larry Hatcher - trumpet, vocals, keyboards,
- Shirley Hayden - vocals
- Lili Haydn - violin, vocals
- **Eddie Hazel** - guitar, vocals
- Larry Heckstall - vocals
- John Heintz - bass, percussion
- Paul Hill - Vocals
- Lenny "Jam" Holmes - vocals, guitar
- Sonja Holmes - vocals
- Sheila Horne - vocals
- Stan "Quazedelic" Harris - vocals, percussion
- Shaunna Hall

== I ==
- Brad Innis - drums
- Archie Ivy

== J ==
- James Wesley Jackson - comedian
- Bennie Jacobs - bass
- Cheryl James - vocals
- Garry "Dee Dee" James - guitar
- Prakash John - bass
- Joel "Razor-Sharp" Johnson - keyboards
- Robert "P-Nut" Johnson - vocals
- Anita Johnson - vocals
- Renny Jones - bass
- Giles "Killa G" Judd - keyboards

| valign="top" width=15 | | valign="top" width=50% |

== K ==
- Louie "Babbling" Kabbabie - vocals

== L ==
- Tyrone Lampkin - drums
- Patavian Lewis - vocals
- Rico Lewis - drums
- Tracey "Trey Lewd" Lewis - vocals, guitar
- Trafael Lewis - guitar
- Patrice "Emerald" Llewellyn - vocals
- Overton Loyd - artwork

== M ==
- Lynn Mabry - vocals
- Romeo Magruder - drums, vocals
- Kim Manning - vocals
- Foley McCreary - drums
- Robert McCollough - saxophone
- Thomas "Pae-dog" McEvoy - jazz horn
- Eric McFadden - guitar
- Jeanette McGruder - vocals
- DeWayne "Blackbyrd" McKnight - guitar, bass, drums
- Carlos McMurray - dancer
- Dwayne "Sa'D Ali" Maultsby - vocals
- Billy Mims - guitar, vocals
- Ray Monette
- **Walter "Junie" Morrison** - keyboards, vocals, guitar, bass, drums (sometimes credited as J.S. Theracon)
- **Cordell "Boogie" Mosson** - bass, guitar, drums
- Lonnie "Mongoose" Motley - bass, vocals
- Mike "Murphquake" Murphy - bongos
- Carolyn Myles - vocals

== N ==
- Richie "Shakin'" Nagan - percussion
- **"Billy Bass" Nelson** - bass, vocals
- Tonysha Nelson - vocals
- Matt "Fresh Step" Nalley - percussion

== O ==
- Rose Offord - vocals

== P ==
- Stevie Pannell - guitar
- Maceo Parker - saxophone, flute, piano
- Tairee "Thurteen" Parks - rapper
- Sharla L. Patrick - keyboards, vocals
- Mike Patterson - bass
- Leon Patillo - vocals
- Michael "Clip" Payne - vocals, keyboards
- Brian Photar - vocals, bass
- Peter "Keys" Pisarczyk - keyboards
- Ben Powers Jr. - drums

== R ==
- Razzberry White - vocals
- Bouvier Richardson - rapper
- Ronald Rolling - trumpet
- Lucius "Tawl" Ross - guitar, vocals
- Derrick "Frogg" Rosson - Rapper
- Rufus Roundtree - trombone
- Ricky Rouse - guitar
- Ryan "Number 1" Maloney - Bass

== S ==
- Nairobi Sailcat - guitar
- Sativa Diva - vocals
- Marion Saulsby - keyboards
- Chris "Citrus" Sauthoff - guitar, vocals
- Joseph Scott Jr. - vocals, guitar, bass
- Garrett Shider - guitar, vocals
- **Garry Shider** - vocals, guitar
- Kevin "K-Star" Shider - guitar, vocals
- Linda Shider - vocals
- Nate Shider - vocals, guitar
- Tim Shider - vocals, bass, keyboards
- Dawn Silva - vocals
- **Calvin Simon** - vocals, percussion
- Carl "Butch" Small - percussion
- Herb Sparkman - vocals
- Claude Spivey - bass
- David Spradley - keyboards (also credited as David Lee Chong and Chong Spradley)
- Donnie Sterling - bass, vocals
- T.M. Stevens
- Sly Stone
- Michael Syme - guitar
- RonKat Spearman - guitar, vocals, bass
- Sage “Fingers” Szondy - bass

== T ==
- Scott Taylor - saxophone
- Gene "Just-A-Gene-O" Thomas - guitar, vocals
- **Grady Thomas** - vocals
- Greg Thomas - saxophone
- Tony "Strat" Thomas - guitar
- Tony Thomas - drums (not to be confused with Tony "Strat" Thomas)
- Roger Troutman - vocals
- Isaac Turner
- Michael "Double K" Turner a.k.a. "LA Mike" - DJ

== V ==
- Earl Van Dyke - keyboards

== W ==
- Frank "Kash" Waddy - drums
- Tony Walker - vocals
- Jeanette Washington - vocals
- Lin Washington - vocals, bass
- Steve Washington - horns
- Butch Watson - guitar
- Harry Watson - guitar
- Fred Wesley - trombone
- John "Johnny Fly" Wiley - keyboards
- Andre "Foxxe" Williams - guitar, vocals
- Kelvan Wilkins - vocals, guitar
- Ernestro Wilson - keyboards
- Bobby Womack - vocals
- Belita Woods - vocals
- **Bernie Worrell** - keyboards
- Lawrence "L*A*W" Worrell - vocals, guitar, bass, drums, harmonica, organ
- Debbie Wright - vocals
- Ronald Wright - drums
- Philippé Wynne - vocals

== Bands ==
- 420 Funk Mob
- Bernie Worrell and the WOO Warriors
- The Big Ol' Nasty Getdown
- Bootsy's Rubber Band
- The Brides of Funkenstein
- Children of Production
- Bennie Cowan and Brass Taxx
- Eramus Hall
- Funkadelic
- Godmoma
- The Horny Horns
- INCorporated Thang Band
- Jimmy G and the Tackheads
- Katdelic
- Kiddo
- Let The Monkey Go
- Mr. Fiddler
- Mutiny
- O.G. Funk
- Original P
- Otis Day & the Knights
- Parlet
- Parliament
- The Parliaments
- P-Funk All-Stars
- Quazar
- Slavemaster
- Sly Fox
- Space Cadets
- The Sterling Silver Starship Band
- Sweat Band
- Zapp
