= Cheryl James (P-Funk) =

American road manager and background singer

- Cheryl James speaking at The Secret Society of Twisted Storytellers, 2024

Cheryl Ann James is an American road and entertainment manager and background vocalist known for her work with Parliament-Funkadelic, Parlet, and The Brides of Funkenstein during the late 1970s and early 1980s. She was part of the P-Funk collective’s touring infrastructure and contributed to studio recordings during her tenure.

== Career ==
James began working in the music industry after leaving a corporate position at Ford Motor Company in Detroit. She was introduced to tour logistics by working briefly with Dennis Edwards of The Temptations before joining the Parliament-Funkadelic organization in the late 1970s.

She became the road manager for Parlet, an all-female P-Funk spin-off group formed by George Clinton. She later managed tours for the Brides of Funkenstein and supported larger Parliament-Funkadelic productions in 1979 and 1980. Her responsibilities included overseeing travel logistics, venue coordination, and day-to-day artist support.

In addition to her work as a tour manager, James contributed background vocals to several Parliament-Funkadelic recordings, particularly with Parlet and the Brides of Funkenstein. One of her most recognizable moments appears on the 1978 track “Deep” produced by Junie Morrison for Parliament’s album Motor Booty Affair. In the song’s spoken-word intro, James delivers the line:

“I saw you only Friday, Joe. And just let me say: you tried to take me through a thousand confessions... You know there’s Billy, you know there’s Benny — the rest of the days. Besides, it helps me with my problem complexion.”

She is also officially credited among the backing vocalists for Motor Booty Affair, alongside Dawn Silva, Debbie Wright, Jeanette Washington, Lynn Mabry, and Mallia Franklin.

Junie Morrison also named Cheryl James among the three singers who cut the core background parts for Funkadelic’s “(Not Just) Knee Deep,” alongside Lynn Mabry and Shirley Hayden.

James eventually stepped away from the music business after experiencing health issues while on tour. She later worked in private household management in Los Angeles before returning to Detroit.

== Later recognition ==
In 2023, James participated in a two-part interview on the web series Truth in Rhythm, recounting her experiences in the P-Funk touring world.

She was featured in the 2025 PBS Detroit special We Want the Funk, where she was introduced as George Clinton’s former road and entertainment manager.

James is also discussed in Dawn Silva’s 2023 autobiography *The Funk Queen*, where Silva describes the behind-the-scenes dynamics of the P-Funk groups and acknowledges Cheryl’s support in facilitating media access and artist logistics.

James is one of the women featured in Seth Neblett's oral-history book Mothership Connected: The Women of Parliament-Funkadelic (2025), where her firsthand account of working with Parliament-Funkadelic is included.

== Selected credits ==
- Parliament — Motor Booty Affair (1978), backing vocals.
- Funkadelic — “(Not Just) Knee Deep” (1979), background vocals as described by Morrison.
- Parlet / Brides of Funkenstein — additional backing vocals (uncredited).
- Compilation credits on Parliament anthologies including Gold (2005) and Six Degrees of P-Funk (2003).
