= Rest in P =

Rest In P

Studio album by Eddie Hazel
- Released: July 25th, 1994
- Recorded: 1975–76
- Genre: Funk rock
- Length: 63:26
- Label: P-Vine Records
- Producer: George Clinton

Eddie Hazel chronology
Game, Dames and Guitar Thangs (1977)	Rest In P (1994)

Professional ratings
Review scores
Source	Rating
AllMusic	4/5 stars

Rest in P is a 1994 posthumous album release by Parliament-Funkadelic guitarist Eddie Hazel. The album was released by P-Vine records in Japan on July 25, 1994, and is composed of previously unreleased tracks recorded by Eddie Hazel between 1975 and 1977. The album features musical support from various members of the P-Funk stable.

Alternate recordings of four tracks from Rest in P with different titles were also featured on the Jams From The Heart EP and were included as bonus tracks on Rhino Records' 2004 limited-edition reissue of Game, Dames and Guitar Thangs.

Despite being heavily sought by collectors, Rest In P has never been released outside of Japan.

== Tracks list ==
All tracks are written by Eddie Hazel, unless stated otherwise. On the album, he is credited as Grace Cook, his mother, for contractual purposes. That was the case not only for his solo career, but albo some records he made with Parliament-Funkadelic, for example Standing on the Verge of Getting It On.

No.	Title	Writer(s)	Length
1.	"Until It Rains"		4:50
2.	"Beyond Word and Measure"		4:46
3.	"Relic 'Delic (Purple Hazel)"		3:01
4.	"Straighten Up"		5:14
5.	"Juicy Fingers"		14:18
6.	"We Three"	Eddie Hazel, George Clinton	12:09
7.	"Why Cry?"		2:48
8.	"We Are One"		6:10
9.	"No, It's Not!"	Hazel, Clinton	9:23
10.	"Until It Rains (Reprise)"		0:47
Total length:			63:26

== Personnel ==
- Eddie Hazel
- Billy Bass Nelson
- Tiki Fulwood
- Bernie Worrell
- Bootsy Collins
- Buddy Miles
- Jerome Brailey
- Lynn Mabry
- Dawn Silva
