= Live: Meadowbrook, Rochester, Michigan – 12th September 1971 =

Funkadelic Live: Meadowbrook, Rochester, Michigan 12th September 1971

Live album by Funkadelic
- Released: 1996
- Recorded: 1971
- Genres: Psychedelic rock, funk, psychedelic soul
- Length: 77:16
- Label: Westbound

Alternative cover
- Original 1996 cover

Funkadelic Live: Meadowbrook, Rochester, Michigan 12th September 1971 is a 1996 live release featuring the only official in-concert recording from early in the career of Funkadelic. Westbound Records owner Armen Boladian had decided to record the show without the band's prior notice, for a possible official live album release. Boladian then decided not to go forward with the project. The soundboard recording resided with engineer Ed Wolfram until being unearthed in 1996. The album contains the entire live performance of September 12, 1971, minus approximately three minutes of between-song chatter.

== Background ==
In late 1971, George Clinton was still structuring Funkadelic as the live band supporting his concurrent doo wop vocal group Parliament, even though by that point multiple albums had been released under both names. As was common for concerts during the period, the Funkadelic musicians would warm up the crowd with instrumentals, after which the Parliament singers would take to the stage for the vocal numbers. The concert would end in a similar fashion, with the Parliament singers exiting slightly before the end of the show, with the Funkadelic musicians closing with another instrumental.

At the show recorded for this album, the band opened with two extended instrumentals totaling about 20 minutes: the then-untitled "Alice in My Fantasies" (to be later recorded with vocals on the 1974 Funkadelic album Standing on the Verge of Getting It On) and "Maggot Brain." The closing instrumental consisted of a short portion of "Free Your Mind and Your Ass Will Follow." The vocal tracks originated from the albums Funkadelic and Maggot Brain with the exception of two tracks that had been recorded originally as singles by Parliament: "I Call My Baby Pussycat" (later retooled for the 1972 Funkadelic album America Eats Its Young) and "All Your Goodies Are Gone (The Loser's Seat)" (later retooled for the 1974 Parliament album Up for the Down Stroke). There was no encore.

This concert was beset by personnel issues. Guitarist Tawl Ross had recently dropped out of the band due to a damaging experience with LSD and was replaced right before the show by former Isaac Hayes sideman Harold Beane. Original drummer Tiki Fulwood had also departed right before this show to explore other musical opportunities, and was replaced by former Apollo Theater house drummer Tyrone Lampkin. Sources indicate that Beane and Lampkin had rehearsed either very little or not at all before this performance. This resulted in many musical difficulties, particularly because of the differences in drumming styles between Lampkin and Fulwood, which in turn created many difficulties for bassist Billy Bass Nelson. These problems resulted in an inadvertent breakdown during the performance of "I Call My Baby Pussycat," while Nelson stormed off the stage in frustration before the conclusion of "Free Your Mind and Your Ass Will Follow." Nelson and lead guitarist Eddie Hazel left the group about a month after this concert.

== Track listing ==
No.	Title	Writer(s)	Length
1.	"Alice in My Fantasies"	George Clinton, Eddie Hazel	6:37
2.	"Maggot Brain"	Hazel, Clinton	14:02
3.	"I Call My Baby Pussycat" (fast version)	Billy "Bass" Nelson, Clinton, Hazel	5:38
4.	"I Call My Baby Pussycat"	Nelson, Clinton, Hazel	8:08
5.	"Good Old Music"	Clinton	4:31
6.	"I Got a Thing, You Got a Thing, Everybody Got a Thing"	Clarence "Fuzzy" Haskins	8:38
7.	"All Your Goodies Are Gone (The Loser's Seat)"	Clinton, Haskins, Nelson	15:08
8.	"I'll Bet You"	Clinton, Sidney Barnes, Pat Lindsey	5:25
9.	"You and Your Folks, Me and My Folks"	Clinton, Bernie Worrell, Nelson, Haskins	5:28
10.	"Free Your Mind and Your Ass Will Follow" (instrumental)	Clinton, Hazel, Tawl Ross	3:41
Total length:			77:16

== Personnel ==
- Parliament (George Clinton, Fuzzy Haskins, Calvin Simon, Grady Thomas, Ray Davis): Vocals
- Eddie Hazel: Lead Guitar, vocals
- Billy Bass Nelson: Bass, vocals
- Bernie Worrell: Keyboards, vocals
- Harold Beane: Guitar
- Tyrone Lampkin: Drums
