= George Clinton: The Mothership Connection =

Video by George Clinton; Parliament-Funkadelic
- Released: 1998; reissued in 2001
- Recorded: October 31, 1976
- Genre: Funk
- Length: 83:00
- Label: Pioneer Artists
- Producer: George Clinton, Alan Douglas, and Archie Ivy

George Clinton; Parliament-Funkadelic chronology
George Clinton: The Mothership Connection (1998)	George Clinton And Parliament/Funkadelic – Live At Montreux (2004)

George Clinton: The Mothership Connection is a DVD released in 1998 and then reissued in 2001, featuring George Clinton and Parliament-Funkadelic. The DVD features a concert performed by Parliament-Funkadelic at The Summit in Houston, Texas on October 31, 1976. The DVD documents the beginning of famed P-Funk Earth Tour, which would run for almost two years.

The tour was undertaken as the Parliament album The Clones of Dr. Funkenstein (Casablanca, September) and Funkadelic albums Tales of Kidd Funkadelic (Westbound, September 21) and Hardcore Jollies (Warner Bros, October 29) were released. The set-list included "Do That Stuff", "Gamin' On Ya", "Children Of Production", "Dr. Funkenstein", "Funkin' For Fun" from the Parliament album, and "Undisco Kidd" and "Comin' Round The Mountain" from each of the Funkadelic albums. The album Live: P-Funk Earth Tour (Casablanca, May 5, 1977) was recorded a few months into this tour.

Support came from Bootsy's Rubber Band (with The Horny Horns) who were still promoting their debut album Stretchin' Out in Bootsy's Rubber Band, a live recording issued later in 2001 as Live in Oklahoma 1976, and Sly and the Family Stone promoting Heard Ya Missed Me, Well I'm Back (Epic, December 18, 1976). Members of the opening acts joined the headliners for the end of the set.

== Tracks ==
1. "Cosmic Slop" (George Clinton, Bernie Worrell)
2. "Do That Stuff" (Clinton, Worrell, Garry Shider)
3. "Gamin' On Ya" (Clinton, Worrell, Bootsy Collins)
4. "Standing on the Verge of Getting It On" (Clinton, Grace Cook) / "Undisco Kidd" (Clinton, Worrell, Collins)
5. "Children Of Production" (Clinton, Worrell, Collins)
6. "Mothership Connection (Star Child)" (Clinton, Worrell, Collins)
7. "Swing Down Sweet Chariot" (Glen Goins, Clinton, Worrell)
8. "Dr. Funkenstein" (Clinton, Worrell, Collins)
9. "Comin' Round The Mountain"
10. "P-Funk (Wants To Get Funked Up)" (Clinton, Worrell, Collins)
11. "Give Up the Funk (Tear the Roof off the Sucker)" (Clinton, Jerome Brailey, Collins)
12. "Night Of The Thumpasorus Peoples" (Clinton, Shider, Collins)
13. "Funkin' For Fun" (Clinton, Shider, Goins)

== Personnel ==
=== Parliament ===
- George Clinton – vocals
- Fuzzy Haskins – vocals
- Grady Thomas – vocals
- Calvin Simon – vocals
- Ray Davis – vocals

=== Parlet ===
- Debbie Wright – vocals
- Jeanette Washington – vocals

=== Funkadelic ===
- Glenn Goins – electric guitar, vocals
- Garry Shider – guitar, vocals
- Michael Hampton – lead guitar
- Cordell Mosson – bass guitar
- Bernie Worrell – keyboards
- Jerome Brailey – drums

=== Horny Horns ===
- Fred Wesley – trombone
- Maceo Parker – saxophone
- Richard Griffith – trumpet
- Rick Gardner – trumpet
- Members of the P-Funk spin-off act Bootsy's Rubber Band, as well as Sly and the Family Stone, appear near the end of the video.

== See also ==
- The Mothership Connection – Live from Houston
