= Say Blow by Blow Backwards =

Studio album by Fred Wesley and the Horny Horns
- Released: 1979
- Recorded: 1979
- Studios: United, Detroit, Michigan
- Genre: Funk
- Length: 56:12
- Label: Atlantic
- Producers: Bootsy Collins, George Clinton, Fred Wesley

Fred Wesley and the Horny Horns chronology
A Blow for Me, A Toot for You (1977)	Say Blow by Blow Backwards (1979)	The Final Blow (1994)

Say Blow by Blow Backwards is the second and last album by Fred Wesley and the Horny Horns, featuring Maceo Parker. The album was released in August 1979 by Atlantic Records and was produced by George Clinton, Bootsy Collins, and Fred Wesley.

The album was reissued in 1993, first by P-Vine records in Japan, then by Sequel Records in the UK, and lastly by AEM in the U.S. The CD reissue contains remixes of "Half a Man" and "Say Blow by Blow Backwards", as well as an interview with Bootsy Collins.

== Critical reception ==
Professional ratings
Review scores
Source	Rating
AllMusic	3/5 stars

The Bay State Banner wrote that the album "has some fine alto sax from Maceo Parker, but little else to recommend it... In addition, a poor mix blurs the sound and muddles the bass and drums." The Pittsburgh Press noted that Parker's "at his best on fast tunes, blowing choppy phrases over syncopated backing." In 1994, Rolling Stone determined that "the horn solos on Say Blow by Blow Backwards (AEM) are generally outclassed by the bass work of Bootsy Collins and Billy Nelson."

== Track listing ==
1. "We Came to Funk Ya" (Bootsy Collins)
2. "Half a Man" (Billy Bass Nelson, George Clinton)
3. "Say Blow by Blow Backwards" (Fred Wesley)
4. "Mr. Melody Man" (Ron Dunbar)
5. "Just Like You" (George Clinton, Garry Shider)
6. "Circular Motion" (Fred Wesley)

Bonus tracks on the CD reissue

7. "Half a Man" (New Remix)
8. "Say Blow by Blow Backwards" (New Remix)
9. Interview (with Bootsy Collins)

== Personnel ==
- Bootsy Collins, Phelps Collins, Garry Shider, Rodney Crutcher, Michael Hampton - guitar
- Bootsy Collins, Donnie Sterling, Billy Bass Nelson, Cordell Mosson, Rodney Curtis - bass
- Bootsy Collins, Gary "Mudbone" Cooper, Frank Waddy, Tyrone Lampkin, Jerome Brailey, Jesse Williams - drums
- Bernie Worrell, Joel Johnson, Jerome Rogers, Maceo Parker, Fred Wesley - keyboards
- Fred Wesley, Maceo Parker, Rick Gardner, Richard Griffith - horns
- Carl "Butch" Small, Larry Fratangelo - percussion
- Gary "Mudbone" Cooper, Jessica Cleaves, Dawn Silva, Jeanette McGruder, Sheila Horne, Robert "P-Nut" Johnson, George Clinton - backing vocals

Technical

- Ronald P."Stozo" Edwards - cover illustration
