= A Blow for Me, a Toot to You =

A Blow For Me, a Toot to You

Studio album by Fred Wesley and the Horny Horns
- Released: April 17, 1977
- Recorded: 1977
- Studio: United Sound Studio, Detroit, Michigan; Hollywood Sound Studio, Hollywood, California
- Genre: Funk
- Length: 41:04
- Label: Atlantic
- Producer: Bootsy Collins; George Clinton

Fred Wesley and the Horny Horns chronology
A Blow For Me, a Toot to You (1977)	Say Blow by Blow Backwards (1979)

A Blow for Me, a Toot to You is a 1977 album by funk musician Fred Wesley and the Horny Horns featuring Maceo Parker.

== Reception ==
Professional ratings
Review scores
Source	Rating
Allmusic	4.5/5 stars

The album contains heavy participation by the P-Funk musical collective, including Garry Shider, Michael Hampton, and Jerome Brailey. The album also contains the heavily sampled track "Four Play," whose title prevented it from garnering airplay when it was released as a single.

The album was produced by George Clinton and Bootsy Collins, and was reissued in 1993, first by P-Vine records in Japan, then by Sequel Records in the UK, and lastly AEM in the U.S.. The reissue contains two new remixes of the tracks "Four Play" and "A Blow for Me, a Toot to You", as well as an interview with George Clinton discussing the recording's background. Years later, WEA released both Horny Horns albums on a two-CD set, in the UK.

== Track listing ==
1. "Up for the Down Stroke" (George Clinton, Bootsy Collins, Bernie Worrell, Fuzzy Haskins) (released as single ST-A-33756) – 9:10
2. "A Blow for Me, a Toot to You" (George Clinton, Bootsy Collins, Fred Wesley) – 7:20
3. "When In Doubt: Vamp" (George Clinton, Garry Shider, Bernie Worrell) – 4:21
4. "Between Two Sheets" (George Clinton, Bootsy Collins, Maceo Parker) – 6:50
5. "Four Play" (George Clinton, Bootsy Collins, Glenn Goins) (released as single ST-3408, then later withdrawn) – 8:03
6. "Peace Fugue" (Fred Wesley) – 6:00

=== Bonus tracks on the CD reissue ===
7. "A Blow for Me, a Toot to You" (New Remix)
8. "Four Play" (New Remix)
9. Interview (with George Clinton)

== Personnel ==
- Fred Wesley (trombone), Maceo Parker (saxophone), Rick Gardner (trumpet), Richard "Kush" Griffith (trumpet) - horns
- Brecker Brothers - additional horns
- Jerome Brailey, Frankie "Kash" Waddy, Bootsy Collins - drums
- Glenn Goins, Garry Shider, Michael Hampton, Bootsy Collins, Phelps Collins - guitar
- Bootsy Collins - bass
- Bernie Worrell - keyboards
- Fred Wesley, Maceo Parker, Rick Gardner, Richard Griffith, George Clinton, Bootsy Collins, Gary "Mudbone" Cooper, Lynn Mabry, Dawn Silva, Taka Khan, Bernie Worrell, Phelps Collins, Randy Crawford, Robert "P-Nut" Johnson - vocals

Technical

- Jim Callon, Jim Vitti - engineer
- Ronald "Stozo" Edwards - cover illustration

== Charts ==
Chart (1977)	Peak position
Billboard Pop Albums	181
Billboard Top Soul Albums	31

=== Singles ===
Year	Single	Chart positions
Year	Single	US R&B
1977	"Up For The Down Stroke"	93

== Samples and covers ==
- Gang Starr sampled "Four Play" for the title track of their album Step in the Arena (1991).
- Raw Fusion sampled "Peace Fugue" on their song "Freaky Note", on their album Hoochiefied Funk (1994).
- Nas sampled "Peace Fugue" on his song "Life We Chose", on his album Nastradamus (1999).
- Digital Underground sampled "Four Play" on their song "Packet Man", on their album Sex Packets (1990).
