= Kiddo =

American P-Funk band

Background information
- Origin: Long Beach, California, United States
- Genres: Funk, P-Funk, R&B, soul
- Years active: 1981–1984
- Label: A&M Records
- Past members: Donnie Sterling; Michael Hampton; Arthur Brown; Rock Goodin; Willie Jenkins; Juice Johnson; Leroy Davis; Tony "Strat" Thomas

Kiddo was a P-Funk offspring group at A&M Records, formed by Parliament-Funkadelic guitarist Michael Hampton and writer Donnie Sterling, in the early 1980s.

== History ==
In 1978, one of Kiddo's founding members, Donnie Sterling, was a member of Parlet, a P-Funk girl group created by George Clinton. As Parlet's band leader and bass player, Sterling wrote three songs on Parlet's second album, Invasion of the Booty Snatchers, then became a P-Funk writer for producers Clinton and Ron Dunbar. Sterling wrote songs for Parliament in the late 1970s, and is best known for his vocal performance on "Agony Of Defeet" on the 1980 album Trombipulation. Sterling and his then-wife and Parlet bandmate, Mallia Franklin, left the group in 1979 to form a P-Funk offspring group called Sterling Silver Starship. The group recorded an album that was never released. Some of those tracks can be heard on the George Clinton Family Series.

Franklin continued to do studio work with P-Funk and Zapp, while Sterling partnered with Funkadelic guitarist Michael Hampton, and both continued to work with Clinton. Hampton had been recruited as Funkadelic's guitarist in 1974 at the age of 17, first appearing on Let's Take It to the Stage.

In 1981, financial and legal difficulties led Clinton to disband Parliament-Funkadelic. After the disbandment, Sterling and Hampton formed Kiddo in 1981. They partnered with Arthur Brown, Willie Jenkins, Leon Goodin, Fred Johnson, Tony "Strat" Thomas, and Leroy Davis, who led a band that included Hazel Payne.

Kiddo went on to record two successful albums for A&M Records, producing hits like "Try My Lovin" and "She's Got the Body".

== Discography ==
- 1983 - Kiddo - A&M Records
- 1984 - Action - A&M Records
