= Live at the Howard Theatre =

- Japanese pressing of the album "Live at the Howard Theatre"

Live album by The Brides of Funkenstein
- Released: October 25, 1994
- Recorded: November 1st and 2nd, 1978
- Genre: P-Funk
- Length: 53:43
- Label: P-Vine Records
- Producer: George Clinton

The Brides of Funkenstein chronology
Never Buy Texas From A Cowboy (1979)	Live at the Howard Theatre (1994)

Live at the Howard Theatre is a live album by the P-Funk spin-off act, the Brides of Funkenstein. The album was recorded on November 1 and 2, 1978, at the Howard Theatre in Washington D.C. The album was released by P-Vine Records in Japan on October 25, 1994, Sequel Records in the UK, and AEM Records in the U.S. The album was produced by George Clinton for Black Dog Records and A Scoop of Poop productions.

== Track listing ==
1. "Introduction"
2. "War Ship Touchante" (Archie Ivy, Bernie Worrell, George Clinton)
3. "Birdie" (Garry Shider, George Clinton, Rodney Curtis, Ron Dunbar)
4. "Ride On" (Bernie Worrell, William Collins, George Clinton)
5. "Brides Maids" (George Clinton)
6. "Vanish in Our Sleep" (William Collins)
7. "Together" (Bernie Worrell, William Collins, George Clinton)
8. "Disco to Go" (William Collins, George Clinton)
9. "Comedic monologue: James Wesley Jackson"

== Personnel ==
- Vocals: Lynn Mabry and Dawn Silva
- Drums: Frankie Kash Waddy
- Keyboards: Joel "Razor Sharp" Johnson
- Horns: Maceo Parker, Richard "Kush" Griffith, Rick Gardner
- Bass: Jeff Bunn
- Guitars: DeWayne "Blackbyrd" McKnight
- Narrator "Funkamedian": James Wesley Jackson
