= Never Buy Texas from a Cowboy =

Studio album by Brides of Funkenstein
- Released: 1979
- Recorded: 1979
- Genre: Funk
- Length: 42:24
- Label: Atlantic
- Producer: George Clinton

Brides of Funkenstein chronology
| Funk or Walk (1978) | Never Buy Texas from a Cowboy (1979) | Live at the Howard Theatre (1994) |

Never Buy Texas from a Cowboy is the second album by the American female funk band Brides of Funkenstein, released on Atlantic Records in 1979. Morphing into a trio on the second album release, the vocalists consisted of Dawn Silva, Sheila Horne, and Jeanette McGruder. Horne and McGruder served as background vocalists on subsequent P-Funk concert tours.

Never Buy Texas from a Cowboy would be granted a Cashbox Rhythm & Blues Award in 1980 for 'Best Female Group'. The song slated for the award was the 1979 single "Didn't Mean to Fall in Love", written and produced by Ron Dunbar. The album's top single release, "Never Buy Texas from a Cowboy" became a hit in the Midwest, Europe and Asia.

Never Buy Texas from a Cowboy was produced by George Clinton except for "Smoke Signals", which was produced by Clinton and Bootsy Collins, and "Didn't Mean to Fall in Love", which was produced by Ron Dunbar. The album was later reissued in the U.S. by the Wounded Bird label on October 18, 2011.

== Critical reception ==
Professional ratings
Review scores
| Source | Rating |
|---|---|
| AllMusic | 3/5 stars |
| Christgau's Record Guide | A− |

The Pittsburgh Press noted "the lack of satirical, sometimes fantastic lyrics of P/Funk." The Morning Call wrote that "there's entirely too much screaming, counter-beats, and dissonance in the background."

In 2002, Rolling Stone listed Never Buy Texas from a Cowboy at No. 26 on its list of the 50 "coolest" albums of all time.

== Track listing ==
1. "Never Buy Texas from a Cowboy" (George Clinton, Ron Dunbar) (released as a single - Atlantic 3640) 15:15
2. "I'm Holding You Responsible" (George Clinton, Eddie Hazel) 5:30
3. "Smoke Signals" (George Clinton, Bootsy Collins) 6:40
4. "Mother May I" (Garry Shider, Tracey Lewis, Jim Vitti) 5:35
5. "Party Up in Here" (George Clinton, Rodney Curtis) (released as a 12" single - Atlantic PR 354) 5:33
6. "Didn't Mean to Fall in Love" (Ron Dunbar, Pete Bishop) (released as a single - Atlantic 3658) 4:00

== Personnel ==
- Dawn Silva, Sheila Horne, Jeanette McGruder - vocals
- Bernie Worrell, Gary Hudgins, Ernesto Wilson, Jerome Rogers, Rudy Robinson - keyboards
- Bootsy Collins, Jeff Bunn, Rodney Curtis, Donnie Sterling, Bruce Nazarian - bass
- Garry Shider, Michael Hampton, DeWayne "Blackbyrd" McKnight, Bruce Nazarian, Bootsy Collins, Eddie Hazel, Rodney Crutcher - guitar
- Bootsy Collins, Dennis Chambers, Kenny Colton, Jerry Jones - drums
- Larry Fratangelo, Carl Small - percussion
- Jessica Cleaves, Ray Davis, Mallia Franklin, George Clinton, Tracey Lewis - additional vocals
