= Game, Dames and Guitar Thangs =

Studio album by Eddie Hazel
- Released: July 29th, 1977
- Genres: Psychedelic soul, funk, hard rock
- Length: 34:24
- Label: Warner Bros.
- Producers: Eddie Hazel, George Clinton

Eddie Hazel chronology
Game, Dames and Guitar Thangs (1977)	Rest in P (1994)

Professional ratings
Review scores
Source	Rating
Allmusic	4/5 stars
Christgau's Record Guide	B−

Game, Dames and Guitar Thangs is the debut album by Parliament-Funkadelic lead guitarist Eddie Hazel. The album was released on July 29, 1977. It was Hazel's only album until his death in 1992, when it was followed by several posthumous releases.

Three songs on the album are covers, "I Want You (She's So Heavy)" (originally recorded by The Beatles), "California Dreamin'" (first recorded by The Mamas & the Papas), and "Physical Love" (originally recorded by Bootsy's Rubber Band). "What About It?" is an instrumental remake of "Wars of Armageddon", originally from the Maggot Brain LP.

A single from the album, an edited version of "California Dreamin'" backed with an instrumental version of the song, was released in 1977 (WBS 8425), yet the instrumental version has never been released on CD.

Game, Dames and Guitar Thangs was cut out soon after its release and became extremely rare. Owning a copy earned one a measure of prestige among P-Funk fans. A 1994 episode of the television series Homicide: Life on the Street involved a shooting motivated by one character's destruction of another character's copy of Game, Dames and Guitar Thangs.

In 2004, Rhino Records issued Game, Dames and Guitar Thangs as a numbered, limited-edition compact disc. As bonus tracks, the Rhino CD included the four songs that made up the hard-to-find Jams From The Heart EP (1994).

After Rhino's limited release sold out, Collector's Choice Music released Game, Dames and Guitar Thangs without the extra songs. The album was re-released in 2012 by RealGoneMusic in gatefold form.

== Track listing ==
No.	Title	Writer(s)	Length
1.	"California Dreamin' (released as a single-Warner Bros. WBS 8425)"	J. Phillips, M. Phillips	6:20
2.	"Frantic Moment"	Clinton, Collins, Worrell	3:43
3.	"So Goes the Story"	Clinton, Collins, Hazel	3:57
4.	"I Want You (She's So Heavy)"	Lennon, McCartney	9:26
5.	"Physical Love"	Clinton, Collins, Cooper, Shider	5:33
6.	"What About It?"	Clinton, Hazel	3:45
7.	"California Dreamin' (Reprise)"	J. Phillips, M. Phillips	1:40
Total length:			34:24

Bonus tracks from Rhino Records Issue
No.	Title	Writer(s)	Length
8.	"Smedley Smorganoff"	Hazel	3:06
9.	"Lampoc Boogie"	Hazel	11:44
10.	"From the Bottom of My Soul"	Hazel	12:32
11.	"Unkut Funk"	Hazel	2:02
Total length:			29:24 63:48

== Personnel ==
- Eddie Hazel, Michael Hampton, Garry Shider, Glenn Goins - guitar
- Bootsy Collins, Billy Bass Nelson, Cordell Mosson - bass
- Jerome Brailey, Bootsy Collins, Tiki Fulwood - drums
- Bernie Worrell - keyboards
- Doug Duffey - keyboards on "I Want You"
- Lynn Mabry, Dawn Silva, Gary Cooper - vocals
