= The Final Blow =

- Japanese front cover of the album "The Final Blow"

Compilation album by Fred Wesley and the Horny Horns
- Released: 1994
- Recorded: 1976–1979
- Genre: Funk/Jazz
- Length: 66:21
- Label: P-Vine Records
- Producer: George Clinton

Fred Wesley and the Horny Horns chronology
Say Blow by Blow Backwards (1979)	The Final Blow (1994)

Professional ratings
Review scores
Source	Rating
AllMusic	4.5/5 stars

The Final Blow is a compilation album by Fred Wesley and the Horny Horns. The album first released on the P-Vine record label in 1994, then on the Sequel label in the United Kingdom, and the AEM label in the United States. The album is made up of unreleased tracks recorded during band's heyday in the late 1970s.

Versions of several tracks from The Final Blow were previously released on other George Clinton produced projects. "Oh I Don't Think Sew" was featured on the 1981 Funkadelic album The Electric Spanking of War Babies under the title Oh I and then was later released with a full horn section on the Parliament compilation "The 12" Collection & More with a full horn section supplied by Fred Wesley and The Horny Horns, and Lickity Split first appeared on the George Clinton archival album Plush Funk.

== Track listing ==
1. "Bells" (Fred Wesley, Maceo Parker, Rick Gardner, Richard Griffith) 11:07
2. "Fallen Off The Edge" (George Clinton, Eddie Hazel) 8:56
3. "The Cookie Monster" (Fred Wesley, Maceo Parker, Rick Gardner, Richard Griffith) 7:29
4. "West Ward Ho" (Fred Wesley, Maceo Parker, Rick Gardner, Richard Griffith) 5:44
5. "Oh I Don't Think Sew" (George Clinton, Rodney Curtis) 10:25
6. "Lickity Split" (Fred Wesley) 9:15
7. "Discositdown" (George Clinton, Mike Clark, Eddie Hazel) 6:01
8. "Four Play" (New Remix) (George Clinton, Glenn Goins, Bootsy Collins)

== Personnel ==
- Frank Waddy, Jerome Brailey, Bootsy Collins, Gary Cooper, Tyrone Lampkin, Jesse Williams - drums
- Phelps Collins, Garry Shider, Michael Hampton, Bootsy Collins, Glenn Goins, Rodney Crutcher - guitar
- Bootsy Collins, Donnie Sterling, Billy Bass Nelson, Cordell Mosson, Rodney Curtis - bass
- Bernie Worrell, Joel Johnson, Jerome Rogers, Maceo Parker, Fred Wesley - keyboards
- Carl "Butch" Small, Larry Fratangelo - percussion
- Fred Wesley, Maceo Parker, Rick Gardner, Richard Griffith - horns
- Michael Brecker, Randy Brecker - additional horns
