= List of Billboard number-one electronic albums of 2003 =

These are the albums that reached number one on the Billboard Dance/Electronic Albums chart in 2003.

== Chart history ==
Key
†	Indicates best-performing album of 2003

Issue date	Album	Artist	Reference
January 4	N.Y.C. Underground Party 5 †	Louie DeVito	
January 11	N.Y.C. Underground Party 5 †	Louie DeVito	
January 18	N.Y.C. Underground Party 5 †	Louie DeVito	
January 25	N.Y.C. Underground Party 5 †	Louie DeVito	
February 1	N.Y.C. Underground Party 5 †	Louie DeVito	
February 8	N.Y.C. Underground Party 5 †	Louie DeVito	
February 15	Other People's Songs	Erasure	
February 22	Disco 3	Pet Shop Boys	
March 1	100th Window	Massive Attack	
March 8	100th Window	Massive Attack	
March 15	100th Window	Massive Attack	
March 22	100th Window	Massive Attack	
March 29	100th Window	Massive Attack	
April 5	100th Window	Massive Attack	
April 12	100th Window	Massive Attack	
April 19	Ultra.Dance 03	Johnny Vicious	
April 26	Ultra.Dance 03	Johnny Vicious	
May 3	Dance Divas	Louie DeVito	
May 10	Dance Divas	Louie DeVito	
May 17	Dance Divas	Louie DeVito	
May 24	Dance Divas	Louie DeVito	
May 31	Dance Divas	Louie DeVito	
June 7	Queer as Folk: The Third Season	Soundtrack	
June 14	Queer as Folk: The Third Season	Soundtrack	
June 21	Queer as Folk: The Third Season	Soundtrack	
June 28	Global Underground 025: Toronto	Deep Dish	
July 5	Louie DeVito's Dance Factor Level 2	Louie DeVito	
July 12	Louie DeVito's Dance Factor Level 2	Louie DeVito	
July 19	Louie DeVito's Dance Factor Level 2	Louie DeVito	
July 26	Louie DeVito's Dance Factor Level 2	Louie DeVito	
August 2	Louie DeVito's Dance Factor Level 2	Louie DeVito	
August 9	Lara Croft Tomb Raider: The Cradle of Life	Soundtrack	
August 16	Lara Croft Tomb Raider: The Cradle of Life	Soundtrack	
August 23	Emotional Technology	BT	
August 30	Emotional Technology	BT	
September 6	Emotional Technology	BT	
September 13	Ultra.Dance 04	Louie DeVito	
September 20	Ultra.Dance 04	Louie DeVito	
September 27	Ultra.Dance 04	Louie DeVito	
October 4	Ultra.Dance 04	Louie DeVito	
October 11	Ultra.Dance 04	Louie DeVito	
October 18	Voyageur	Enigma	
October 25	Voyageur	Enigma	
November 1	The Remixes	Mariah Carey	
November 8	The Remixes	Mariah Carey	
November 15	The Remixes	Mariah Carey	
November 22	The Remixes	Mariah Carey	
November 29	The Remixes	Mariah Carey	
December 6	N.Y.C. Underground Party 6	Louie DeVito	
December 13	The Remixes	Mariah Carey	
December 20	The Remixes	Mariah Carey	
December 27	The Remixes	Mariah Carey	
