= Pleasure Principle (album) =

- Cover art by Shusei Nagaoka

Studio album by Parlet
- Released: February 24, 1978
- Recorded: 1978
- Studio: United Sound Systems, Detroit
- Genre: Funk
- Length: 40:06
- Label: Casablanca
- Producer: George Clinton

Parlet chronology
Pleasure Principle (1978)	Invasion of the Booty Snatchers (1979)

Professional ratings
Review scores
Source	Rating
AllMusic	3/5 stars

Pleasure Principle is the debut album by the female P-Funk spin off group Parlet. The album was released in 1978 by Casablanca Records and was produced by P-Funk leader/producer George Clinton. Parlet consisted of Mallia Franklin, Debbie Wright, and Jeanette Washington. The album features heavy involvement from the P-Funk musical collective.

The track "Cookie Jar" was originally written and recorded by Clarence "Fuzzy" Haskins.

In 1992, Pleasure Principle was reissued on CD in Japan by the Casablanca/Polystar label, but quickly went out of print. On July 30, 2013, Real Gone Music in the U.S. reissued both Pleasure Principle and Invasion of the Booty Snatchers, featuring liner notes by former P-Funk minister of information Tom Vickers.

== Track listing ==
1. "Pleasure Principle" (George Clinton, Ron Ford, Bernie Worrell) (released as single Casablanca NB 919) 8:58
2. "Love Amnesia" (George Clinton, Ron Dunbar, Billy Bass Nelson) 5:22
3. "Cookie Jar" (Clarence "Fuzzy" Haskins) (released as a single-Casablanca NB 932) 5:43
4. "Misunderstanding" (George Clinton, Ron Ford, Bernie Worrell) 7:26
5. "Are You Dreaming?" (Linda Brown, Garry Shider, George Clinton) 7:10
6. "Mr. Melody Man" (Gary Cooper, Ron Dunbar) 5:07

== Personnel ==
Parlet

- Debbie Wright, Jeanette Washington, Mallia Franklin - vocals

with:

- Garry Shider, Michael Hampton, Glenn Goins, Billy Bass Nelson - guitar
- Rodney "Skeet" Curtis, Billy Bass Nelson, Rick Gilmore - bass
- Jim Wright, Frank Waddy, Bootsy Collins, Gary Cooper, Jerome Brailey.- drums
- Bernie Worrell - keyboards
- Fred Wesley, Maceo Parker, Rick Gardner, Richard Griffith - horns
- Brandye, Ron Ford - backing vocals

Technical

- Jerry Estes, Jim Vitti, Mike Iacopelli - recording engineer
- Shusei Nagaoka - cover illustration
