= Wolf ticket =

Wolf ticket may refer to:

- Wolf's ticket, an identification document with discriminatory restrictions
- A Wolf Ticket, a 2009 album by Comadre
- "Wolf Tickets", a 1995 song by the Click from Game Related
- "Wolf Tickets", a 1998 song by Entombed from Same Difference
- "Wolf Tickets", a 1980 song by Parlet from Play Me or Trade Me
