= Funk or Walk =

Studio album by Brides of Funkenstein
- Released: September 1978
- Recorded: 1978
- Genre: Funk, R&B
- Length: 40:47
- Label: Atlantic
- Producer: George Clinton

Brides of Funkenstein chronology
Funk or Walk (1978)	Never Buy Texas from a Cowboy (1979)

Professional ratings
Review scores
Source	Rating
AllMusic	4/5 stars

Funk or Walk is the debut album by the Brides of Funkenstein, released on Atlantic Records in September 1978. The album was produced by George Clinton with the exception of the album's first single "Disco To Go" which was written and produced by Clinton and Bootsy Collins. The Brides of Funkenstein consisted of Lynn Mabry and Dawn Silva, who were members of Sly and the Family Stone prior to joining P-Funk. Funk Or Walk earned Mabry and Silva a Record World Award for Best New Female Artists and Best New R&B Group in 1979. The song was originally performed live by Bootsy's Rubber Band. To this day, the P-Funk All Stars continue to play "Disco To Go" in their live concerts. The Brides of Funkenstein also toured and recorded with Parliament/Funkadelic around this same time.

Funk Or Walk was licensed through Warner Music-Japan and released through the Vivid Sound label (VSCD-276) in 2006. The album was later reissued in the U.S. by the Wounded Bird label on October 18, 2011.

== Track listing ==
1. "Disco to Go" (George Clinton, William Collins) (released as 7" single Atlantic 3498 and 12" single Atlantic DSKO-129) 5:03
2. "War Ship Touchante" (George Clinton, Bernie Worrell, Archie Ivy) (released as single Atlantic 3556) 5:27
3. "Nappy" (George Clinton, Bernie Worrell, Jim Vitti, Garry Shider) 4:29
4. "Birdie" (George Clinton, Rodney Curtis) 5:39
5. "Just Like You" (George Clinton, Lynn Mabry, Garry Shider) 9:11
6. "When You're Gone" (Gary Cooper, Ron Dunbar) (released as b-side to "Disco To Go") 5:19
7. "Amorous" (Garry Shider, Ron Dunbar, Rodney Curtis) (released as the b-side of "War Ship Touchante") 4:54

== Personnel ==
- Vocals Dawn Silva, Lynn Mabry
- Bass: Bootsy Collins, Rodney Curtis
- Guitars: Phelps Collins, Michael Hampton, Garry Shider
- Drums: Frank Waddy, Bootsy Collins, Gary Cooper, Tyrone Lampkin, Jerome Brailey
- Horns: Wayman Reed, George Minger, Danny Turner
- Strings: Detroit Symphony
- Percussion: Larry Fratangelo
- Keyboards: Bernie Worrell, Joel Johnson
- Background vocals: Gary Mudbone Cooper, Jeanette Washington, Ron Banks, Larry Demps
