= Funk Plus the One =

Album by Jerome Brailey

Funk Plus The One

Studio album by Mutiny
- Released: 1980
- Recorded: 1980
- Genre: Funk
- Length: 34:58
- Label: Columbia
- Producer: Jerome Brailey for J. Rony Music Inc.

Mutiny chronology
Mutiny on the Mamaship (1979)	Funk Plus The One (1980)	A Night Out With The Boys (1983)

Professional ratings
Review scores
Source	Rating
AllMusic	2.5/5 stars

Funk Plus The One is the second album by Jerome Brailey and his Funk band Mutiny. The album was released by Columbia Records in 1980. In 1994 the album was reissued by P-Vine records in Japan and contains one extra track entitled "I'm Ready". The album also features a guest appearance by P-Funk bassist/guitarist Cordell Mosson. In 2015 it was reissued in the U.S. by Funky Town Grooves as a two-CD set with their debut album Mutiny On The Mamaship without "I'm Ready," but with three other bonus tracks.

== Track listing ==
All tracks composed by Jerome Brailey; except where indicated

No.	Title	Writer(s)	Length
1.	"Will It Be Tomorrow?"	J. Brailey	3:23
2.	"Anti-Disco"	Jerome Brailey, Raymone Carter, Lenny Holmes	4:33
3.	"Don't Bust the Groove"	Jerome Brailey, James Hockaday	4:11
4.	"Romeo, Take 2"	J. Brailey	1:14
5.	"Reality"	J. Brailey	4:03
6.	"Semi-First Class Seat"	J. Brailey	6:28
7.	"One On One"	J. Brailey	4:39
8.	"The Ballad of Captain Hymbad"	J. Brailey	4:02
9.	"Will It Be Tomorrow (reprise)"	J. Brailey	1:23
10.	"I'm Ready"	J. Brailey	5:05
Total length:			34:58

2015 Funky Town Grooves Bonus Tracks:

No.	Title	Writer(s)	Length
10.	"Semi-First Class Seat"	J. Brailey (7" version, released as Columbia 1-11342)	4:08
11.	"The Rock"	J. Brailey (previously unreleased-early version of "Reality")	4:05
12.	"SSSH"	J. Brailey (previously unreleased-early version of "Will It Be Tomorrow?")	5:25
Total length:			13:48

== Personnel ==
- Jerome Brailey - drums, percussion, lead vocals, production
- Cordell Mosson - guitar, vocals
- Lenny Holmes - guitar, vocals
- Raymone Carter - bass, (lead vocals - 2)
- Skitch Lovett - guitar, vocals
- James Hockaday - bass, (lead vocals - 3)
- Daryl Jones - bass
- Keni Hairston, Nat Lee - keyboards
- Daryl Dixon, Melvin El, Marvin Daniels, David Watson - horns
- Background vocals - Jerome Brailey, Lenny Holmes, Skitch Lovett, Keni Hairston
