= Donnie Sterling =

- Born: United States
- Occupations: Musician, bassist
- Instrument: Bass guitar

Donnie Sterling is a musician brought in by Parlet's Mallia Franklin in 1978 as Parlet's band leader and bass player. After writing three songs on Parlet's second album, Invasion of the Booty Snatchers, Sterling and Franklin both left Parlet in 1979.

Sterling became P-Funk writer for producers George Clinton and Ron Dunbar. Sterling and Franklin attempted to form a P-Funk offspring group Sterling Silver Starship in 1979. An album was recorded, but never released.

Sterling left P Funk in 1981 and formed a group, Kiddo, which was managed by Felix Raymond Rideaux. He recorded two Kiddo albums for A&M Records in the early 1980s.
