= Debbie Wright =

American funk singer (1951–2017)

- Born: June 18, 1951; Detroit, Michigan
- Died: October 12, 2017 (aged 66); Detroit, Michigan

Debbie Wright (June 18, 1951 – October 12, 2017) was an American funk singer, best known for her role in shaping the vocal sound of Parliament-Funkadelic during the 1970s and as a founding member of Parlet, the first all-female P-Funk spin-off group. Her work contributed to the collective's signature harmonies and stage performances.

== Biography ==
Debbie Wright was born on June 18, 1951 in Detroit, Michigan. She began her career in the late 60s as a session singer for The Parliaments alongside Mallia Franklin. Wright and Jeanette Washington became the first official female members of Parliament-Funkadelic in 1975.

Throughout the mid-1970s, Wright contributed backing vocals to several Parliament (band) and Funkadelic albums, including Mothership Connection (1975), The Clones of Dr. Funkenstein (1976), and One Nation Under a Groove (1978). She was also part of the P-Funk Earth Tour, appearing on the live album Live: P-Funk Earth Tour (1977).

By 1978, George Clinton sought to showcase his female background singers in their own act. That year, he formed Parlet, a P-Funk spinoff trio composed of Wright, Franklin, and Washington. The group released their debut album, Pleasure Principle, on Casablanca Records that same year, featuring Wright on lead and background vocals. Shortly after the album's release, Wright parted ways with the group due to health reasons and was replaced by Shirley Hayden.

Debbie Wright passed away on October 12, 2017, in Detroit, Michigan. Her contributions to Parliament-Funkadelic and Parlet remain an essential part of the P-Funk legacy.
