= Maggot Brain (instrumental) =

1971 instrumental by Funkadelic

Instrumental by Funkadelic

from the album Maggot Brain
- Released: 1971
- Recorded: 1971
- Studio: United Sound Systems, Detroit
- Genre: Psychedelia; acid rock; space rock
- Length: 10:20; 9:35 (alternate mix)
- Label: Westbound
- Songwriters: Edward Hazel, George Clinton
- Producer: George Clinton

"Maggot Brain" is an instrumental by the American band Funkadelic, released on their 1971 album Maggot Brain. The original recording, over ten minutes long, features little more than a spoken introduction and an extended guitar solo by Eddie Hazel. Music critic Greg Tate described it as Funkadelic's A Love Supreme. Rolling Stone ranked the song #60 on their list of the "100 Greatest Guitar Songs".

== Title ==
Reportedly, "Maggot Brain" was Eddie Hazel's nickname. Other sources say the title is a reference to Funkadelic leader George Clinton finding his brother Robert's "decomposed dead body, skull cracked, in a Chicago apartment." Michael Hampton (Hazel's replacement as lead guitarist) recorded his own interpretation of the track live in 1978, which was included in a bonus vinyl EP that was distributed with the album One Nation Under a Groove; the cut is also included in most CD editions of that album.

== Creation ==
"Maggot Brain" was recorded in one take when George Clinton, under the influence of LSD, told guitarist Hazel during the recording session to play as if he had been told his mother was dead: Clinton explained "I told him to play like his mother had died, to picture that day, what he would feel, how he would make sense of his life, how he would take a measure of everything that was inside him." Though several other musicians performed on the track, Clinton largely faded them out of the final mix so that the focus would be on Hazel's guitar. Hazel utilized fuzz and wah effects, inspired by his idol Jimi Hendrix; Clinton subsequently added delay and other effects in mixdown, saying "I Echoplexed it back on itself three or four times. That gave the whole thing an eerie feel, both in the playing and in the sound effects." Critics have described the solo as "lengthy, mind-melting" and "an emotional apocalypse of sound."

== Reception ==
From 1976 to 1995, disc jockey Bill "B.L.F. Bash" Freeman started a tradition of playing the original full version of "Maggot Brain" on 100.7 WMMS/Cleveland every Sunday morning at 1:30 (around "last call"). The tradition was picked up in 1987 and was carried on by Mr. Classic, host of "The Saturday Night Live House Party" featured on 98.5 WNCX/Cleveland at 11:50pm until his departure in 2019. Currently, Kenny Kidd keeps the tradition alive by playing the song at the end of his "All Request Saturday Night" show at 12am EST every Sunday morning. In March 2005, Father Nature Magazine placed Hazel's performance on "Maggot Brain" at number 1 in its list of the 100 Greatest Guitar Solos; the solo came in at #71 in "100 Greatest Guitar Solos" by Guitar World magazine. The solo has had great influence on some guitar players, Vernon Reid and Dean Ween among them.

John Frusciante said he was inspired by "Maggot Brain" to record his own version called "Before the Beginning", which is featured on his 2009 album The Empyrean. Dean Ween, the lead guitarist of Ween, has cited Hazel's solo as one that he most frequently "rips off", along with the solo from "Blue Sky" by the Allman Brothers. Donald Glover, a.k.a. Childish Gambino, said in an interview with Billboard that his album "Awaken, My Love!" was inspired by Funkadelic, with the album art even reflecting that of Maggot Brain. Glover's lead single "Me and Your Mama" is supposed to emotionally reflect that of "Maggot Brain", and guitar effects (delay, fuzz and wah-wah) and playing style of "The Night Me and Your Mama Met" is inspired by it.

== Personnel ==
- Eddie Hazel – lead guitar
- Tawl Ross – rhythm guitar
- Billy Bass Nelson – bass
- Bernie Worrell – keyboards
- Tiki Fulwood – drums
- George Clinton – spoken word
- Uncredited musician – percussion
