= The Brides of Funkenstein =

USA funk/soul band

Brides of Funkenstein
- Origin: Detroit, Michigan, United States
- Genres: Soul, funk, P-funk
- Years active: 1978–1981
- Label: Atlantic
- Spinoffs: Parlet
- Spinoff of: Sly and the Family Stone; Parliament; Funkadelic; Parliament-Funkadelic
- Past members: Lynn Mabry; Dawn Silva; Sheila Horne; Jeanette McGruder

The Brides of Funkenstein were an American soul and funk girl band, originally composed of singers Dawn Silva and Lynn Mabry.

== History ==
Previously background singers for Sly Stone, singer of Sly and the Family Stone, Lynn Mabry and Dawn Silva joined the P-funk collective in the mid-1970s. George Clinton named the group from a storyline and characters from the Parliament album The Clones of Dr. Funkenstein. The Brides provided the vocals for the 1977 album Game, Dames and Guitar Thangs by P-Funk guitarist Eddie Hazel. Clinton produced their debut album, Funk Or Walk, for Atlantic Records in 1978. The duo became an opening act for Parliament-Funkadelic tours and also performed backing vocals for the ensemble itself.

Mabry left the group in 1979. Lead singer Silva invited back-up "Bridesmaids" Sheila Horne and Jeanette McGruder to sing on their second album, Never Buy Texas From A Cowboy. This lineup received a Cashbox Rhythm & Blues award for best new female artist, beating out The Pointer Sisters, Sister Sledge, and Cheryl Lynn. The trio recorded a third album, Shadows On The Wall, Shaped Like The Hat You Wore in 1980, but the album was not released. Most of the songs from the unreleased album gradually appeared elsewhere in the P-Funk catalog.

Mabry resurfaced in 1984 as a backing vocalist with Talking Heads, appearing in the concert film Stop Making Sense along with P-Funk colleague Bernie Worrell. Silva and Mabry had a brief reunion in 1981 as the New Wave Brides, opening for Grace Jones, and a lengthy tour with Was (Not Was). Silva would tour and record with the Gap Band from 1983 to 1991, moving on to work with Ice Cube. In 2000 Silva released the solo album All My Funky Friends, which received rave reviews in Europe and Asia. Dawn Silva & The Brides continue to tour.

== Discography ==
Albums	US	US R&B	Year	Label
Funk or Walk	70	17	1978	Atlantic
Never Buy Texas from a Cowboy	93	49	1979	Atlantic
Live at the Howard Theatre			1994	

Singles	US R&B	Year
Disco to Go	7	1978
Amorous	76	1979
Never Buy Texas from a Cowboy	67	1980
