= Mutiny on the Mamaship =

Studio album by Mutiny
- Released: 1979
- Recorded: 1979
- Genres: Funk, disco
- Length: 39:22
- Label: Columbia
- Producer: Jerome Brailey for J. Rony Music Inc.

Mutiny chronology
Mutiny on the Mamaship (1979)	Funk Plus the One (1979)

Professional ratings
Review scores
Source	Rating
AllMusic	4/5 stars
The Village Voice	A−

Mutiny on the Mamaship is the debut album by former Parliament-Funkadelic drummer Jerome Brailey and his band Mutiny. The album was released by Columbia Records in 1979. The album was released a year after Brailey left P-Funk due to a financial dispute. This album featured a lyric sheet showing the dissatisfied content relating to George Clinton's treatment of members of the band.

In 1994, Mutiny on the Mamaship was reissued by P-Vine records in Japan (PCD-2776) with one extra track entitled "Sneakin'". In 2015 it was reissued in the U.S. by Funky Town Grooves as a two-CD set with their next album Funk Plus The One with numerous bonus tracks.

== Track listing ==
1. "Go Away from Here" (Jerome Brailey, Lenny Holmes, Raymond Carter, Robert Mittleman)
2. "What More Can I Say" (Jerome Brailey, Skitch Lovett)
3. "Lump" (Jerome Brailey, Raymond Carter) (released as a single – Columbia 111153 – and 12" single – Columbia AS 696)
4. "Funk 'N' Bop" (Jerome Brailey, Lenny Holmes) (released as 7" single – Columbia 11049 – and 12" single – Columbia AS 655)
5. "Burning Up" (Jerome Brailey, Lenny Holmes, Raymond Carter)
6. "Voyage to the Bottom of the "P"" (Jerome Brailey, Lenny Holmes, Raymond Carter)
7. "Everytime You Come Around" (Jerome Brailey, Lenny Holmes, Raymond Carter)
8. "Romeo (Hope You're Feeling Better)" (Jerome Brailey)

2015 Funky Town Grooves issue Bonus Tracks:

1. . "Funk 'N' Bop" (7" version) (Jerome Brailey, Lenny Holmes)
2. . "How's Your Loose Booty" (previously unreleased) (Jerome Brailey)
3. . "Electric Hot Dog (Red Hot)" (previously unreleased) (Jerome Brailey)
4. . "Funk Rock" (previously unreleased) (Jerome Brailey)
5. . "#7" (previously unreleased) (Jerome Brailey)
6. . "#8" (previously unreleased) (Jerome Brailey)

== Personnel ==
- Jerome Brailey – drums, percussion, syndrums, vocals, production
- Lenny Holmes – guitar, vocals
- Skitch Lovett – guitar, vocals
- Raymond Carter – bass guitar, (lead vocals on 3, 7)
- Nat Lee – keyboards, semi-vocals
- Daryl Dixon, Marvin Daniels, Melvin El – horns
- Background vocals – Jerome Brailey, Lenny Holmes, Raymone Carter, Skitch Lovett, Nat Lee
