= Aftershock 2005 =

Studio album by Mutiny
- Released: 1996
- Recorded: 1996
- Genre: Funk, rock
- Length: 43:54
- Label: Rykodisc (U.S.); Polystar (Japan)
- Producer: Jerome Brailey; Bill Laswell (executive production)

Mutiny chronology
A Night Out With The Boys (1983)	Aftershock 2005 (1996)

Aftershock 2005 is the fourth album by Jerome Brailey's funk band Mutiny. The album was initially released in 1996 by the Polystar label in Japan, and then by Rykodisc Records in the U.S. and UK. The album possesses a more rock-oriented feel than previous Mutiny albums. The album features guest appearances from former P-Funk bandmates Bernie Worrell and Michael Hampton. Aftershock 2005 was one of the last albums released through producer Bill Laswell's Black Arc series.

== Track listing and personnel ==
1) The Growl (5:10)

- Drums - Jerome Brailey
- Guitars - Kevan Wilkins, Skitch Lovette, Chris Beasley
- Bass - Linn Washington
- Keyboards - Juan Nelson
- Turntables and sounds - DXT

2) It's All Good (5:20)

- Drums - Jerome Brailey
- Bass - Jeff Cherokee Bunn
- Guitar solo - Nicky Skopelitis
- Guitars - Kevan Wilkins, Skitch Lovette, Chris Beasley
- Vocals - Fashe Forde
- Background vocals - Fashe Forde, Kevan Wilkins

3) No Choice (4:25)

- Programmed and instruments - Jerome Brailey, D-Tech
- Keyboards - Bernie Worrelll
- Guitar - Michael Hampton
- Vocals - Clarence Allen, Derrick Ross, John Burnett
- Turntables - DXT

4) Passion (5:12)

- Drums - Jerome Brailey
- Lead and background vocals - Fashe Forde
- Keyboards - Bernie Worrell, Juan Nelson
- Guitars - Michael Hampton, Chris Beasley, Kevan Wilkins
- Bass - Jeff Cherokee Bunn

5) Tickin' Like A Time Bomb (4:47)

- Programmed and instruments - Jerome Brailey, D-Tech
- Vocals - Derrick Ross, Sean Sally

6) Rock The Boat (2:51)

- Drums - Jerome Brailey
- Vocals - Brian Champion
- Guitars - Jim Prideaux, Wilbur Harris
- Bass - Allen Flowers "Quick"
- Sampler - Jerome Brailey, B.C. Seville

7) 2005 (5:51)

- Drums - Jerome Brailey
- Vocals - Fashe Forde
- Bass - Jeff Cherokee Bunn
- Guitars - Chris Beasley, Kevan Wilkins
- Turntables - DXT

8) Desires (5:23) - inspired by Eddie Hazel

- Backing vocals - Jerome Brailey
- Guitars - Jim Prideaux, Wilbur Harris
- Bass - Allen Flowers "Quick"
- Keyboards - Craig Day
- Vocals - Wilbur Harris

9) Moments (2:52)

- Keyboards - Craig Day
- Vocals - Fashe Forde

10) The Growl (Revamp) (1:56)
