= Play Me or Trade Me =

Studio album by Parlet
- Released: May 1980
- Recorded: 1980
- Genre: Funk
- Length: 38:39
- Label: Casablanca Records
- Producer: George Clinton, Ron Dunbar

Parlet chronology
Invasion Of The Booty Snatchers (1979)	Play Me or Trade Me (1980)	The Best Of Parlet featuring Parliament (1994)

Professional ratings
Review scores
Source	Rating
AllMusic	3/5 stars

Play Me or Trade Me is the third and final studio album by the P-Funk spin off act Parlet. The album was released by Casablanca Records in May 1980 and was produced by George Clinton and Ron Dunbar. Like many albums released by the label during this year, it would be totally ignored in terms of promotion due to the label being bought by Polygram Records (now Universal Music). The vocal line up for this album (Jeanette Washington, Janice Evans, and Shirley Hayden) remained the same as the previous album. Play Me or Trade Me failed to enter the Billboard R&B album charts.

Play Me or Trade Me was reissued on CD in Japan on the Casablanca/Polystar label in 1992.

== Track listing ==
1. "Help From My Friends" (Ron Dunbar, Tyrone Lampkin)-released as a single, NB 2293 and 12" single, NB 20220. 6:08
2. "Watch Me Do My Thang" (Ron Dunbar, Bootsy Collins) 4:36
3. "Wolf Tickets" (Jimmy Ali, George Clinton. Robert Johnson)-released as a single, NB 2260 and as the A-side to the single "Help From My Friends" 8:57
4. "Play Me Or Trade Me" (Ron Dunbar, Ron Ford, George Clinton) 5:12
5. "I'm Mo Be Hitting It" (Ron Dunbar, Garry Shider, George Clinton) 4:36
6. "Funk Until The Edge of Time" (Steve Pannell, Jeanette Washington, Ron Dunbar) 4:49
7. "Wonderful One" (Ron Dunbar, Cordell Mosson) 4:05

== Personnel ==
- Guitars: Gordon Carlton, Jerome Ali, Bootsy Collins, Phelps Collins, Michael Hampton, Garry Shider
- Bass: Jimmie Ali, Donnie Sterling, Lige Curry, Steve Pannell, Cordell Mosson
- Drums: Kenny Colton, Tyrone Lampkin
- Keyboards: Manon Saulsby, Ernestro Wilson, David Lee Spradley
- Percussion: Janice Carlton, Carl Small, Larry Fratangelo
- Horns: Greg Thomas, Greg Boyer, Benny Cowan, Fred Wesley, Maceo Parker, Richard Griffith, Larry Hatcher, Ernie Fields Jr., David Majal Ii, Nolan Smith Jr., Raymond Lee Brown
- Additional Vocals: Cheryl James, Janice Carlton, Ron Dunbar, Gwen Dozier, George Clinton, Andre Williams, Steve Pannell, Tony Davis, Ron Ford, Jimmie Ali, Jerome Ali, Gordon Carlton, Manon Saulsby
- Cover Illustrations by Ronald "Stozo" Edwards

== Singles ==
- Wolf Tickets (Casablanca NB 2260)
- Help From My Friends (Casablanca NB 2293)

Both tracks were released as one 12" single (Casablanca NBD 20220 DJ)
