= Lakewood Church Central Campus =

Main facility of a megachurch in Houston, Texas, US

Lakewood Church – Central Campus
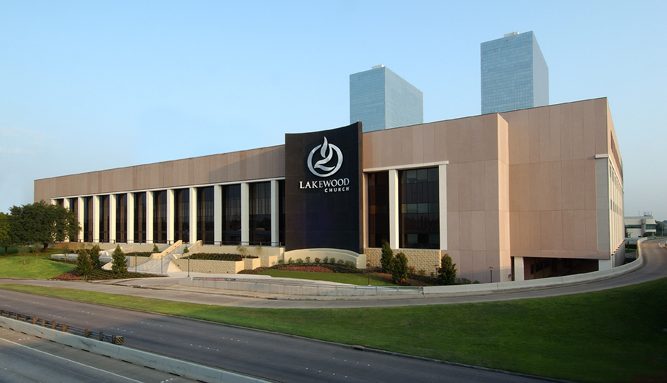
- Exterior of the church c. 2005
- Interactive map of Lakewood Church – Central Campus
- Former names: The Summit (1975–1998); Compaq Center (1998–2003); Lakewood International Center (2003–05 renovations)
- Address: 3700 Southwest Freeway
- Location: Houston, Texas
- Coordinates: 29°43′49″N 95°26′6″W
- Owner: Lakewood Church
- Capacity: 16,800 Basketball: 15,676 (1975–1983); 16,016 (1983–1986); 16,279 (1986–1987); 16,611 (1987–1995); 16,285 (1995–2003); Ice hockey: 14,906 (1975–1983); 15,256 (1983–1994); 15,242 (1994–2003); Indoor Soccer: 14,848
- Scoreboard: Fair Play

Construction
- Groundbreaking: December 1973
- Opened: November 1, 1975
- Closed: December 1, 2003 (as a sports arena)
- Reopened: July 16, 2005
- Cost: US$27 million ($196 million in 2025 dollars)
- Architects: Kenneth Bentsen Associates; Lloyd Jones Associates
- Structural engineer: Walter P Moore

Tenants
- Houston Aeros (WHA) (1975–78); Houston Rockets (NBA) (1975–2003); Houston Summit (MISL) (1978–80); Houston Aeros (IHL/AHL) (1994–2003); Houston Hotshots (CISL) (1994–97); Houston ThunderBears (AFL) (1998–2000); Houston Comets (WNBA) (1997–2003); Lakewood Church (2005–present)
- Building details

General information
- Renovated: 2004–2005
- Renovation cost: $95 million ($162 million in 2025 dollars)

Renovating team
- Architects: Morris Architects; Shaw Architects
- Structural engineer: Walter P Moore
- Services engineer: CHPA & Associates
- Other designers: Irvine Team; Studio Red Architects
- Main contractor: Tellepsen Builders

The Lakewood Church Central Campus is the main facility of Lakewood Church, a non-denominational evangelical Christian megachurch in Houston, Texas, five miles southwest of Downtown Houston and next to Greenway Plaza.

From 1975 to 2003, the building served as a multi-purpose sports arena for professional teams, notably the NBA's Houston Rockets. It was known as The Summit until 1998, when technology firm Compaq bought naming rights and dubbed it Compaq Center. That name was dropped when Toyota Center opened as a new and more advanced professional sports venue in the same city, and the building was leased to Lakewood Church. Seven years later, in 2010, the church bought the building outright.

== Construction of The Summit ==
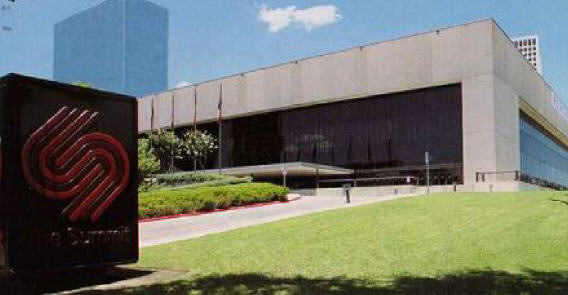
The Summit standing among the high-rise office buildings of Greenway Plaza, c. 1994

In 1971, the National Basketball Association's San Diego Rockets were purchased by new ownership group Texas Sports Investments, who moved the franchise to Houston. The city, however, lacked an indoor arena suitable to host a major sports franchise. The largest arena in the city at the time was 34-year-old Sam Houston Coliseum, but the Rockets would not even consider using it as a temporary facility. Plans were immediately undertaken to construct the new venue that would become The Summit. The Rockets played their home games in various local facilities such as Hofheinz Pavilion and the Astrodome during the interim.

Completed in 1975 at a cost of $18 million, there was an Opening Night Spectacular called "Heart To Heart", benefitting the Baylor College of Medicine, The Methodist Hospital, and the Texas Heart Institute. Andy Williams was the headliner for that evening's extravaganza. The Summit represented a lavish new breed of sports arena, replete with amenities, that would help the NBA grow from a second-tier professional sport into the multibillion-dollar entertainment industry that it is today. The Omni in Atlanta (now the site of State Farm Arena), McNichols Sports Arena in Denver (now a parking lot for Empower Field at Mile High), and the Richfield Coliseum in Richfield, Ohio (now an open meadow in the process of being reclaimed by forest) were all constructed during this period and remained in service until the continued growth of the NBA sparked a new arena construction boom in the late 1990s.

On each end of the arena was a Fair-Play scoreboard with a small two-line monochrome message center. Both scoreboards would be upgraded in 1986 with the addition of three front-projection videoboards on top of each scoreboard. The center videoboard showed live game footage, fan shots, and replays while the left and right videoboards showed slides displaying advertisements for the Rockets' (and Aeros') sponsors.

== Notable events ==
=== Sports ===
The Summit housed the NBA's Rockets, the now defunct WHA/IHL/AHL Aeros, the now also defunct WNBA Comets, several now defunct arena football and Indoor soccer sports teams until they vacated the arena in favor of the new Toyota Center in downtown Houston. Additionally, the arena was a prime Houston venue for popular music concerts and special events such as Ringling Bros. and Barnum & Bailey Circus, the Harlem Globetrotters, Sesame Street Live and Disney on Ice.

The NBA Finals were hosted by The Summit in 1981, 1986, 1994, and 1995, including the deciding games of 1994 and 1995, and the celebrations that followed. The Summit also hosted the WNBA championships of 1997 through 2000, all of which were won by the Houston Comets.

The first professional wrestling event at the Summit was promoted by Houston Wrestling on May 29, 1977, headlined by the American Wrestling Association World Heavyweight Champion Nick Bockwinkel drawing Terry Funk. On January 7, 1979, Dusty Rhodes won the NWA Texas Brass Knuckles Championship from Mark Lewin. The World Wrestling Federation aired the first TV card from the venue on October 19, 1986, featuring Hulk Hogan defending his title against Paul Orndorff and a $50,000 tag team battle royal. It held the Royal Rumble on January 15, 1989. This was the first time the Royal Rumble, won by Big John Studd, was televised on pay-per-view (PPV). The newly renamed Compaq Center hosted the No Way Out of Texas: In Your House PPV on February 15, 1998, and Bad Blood (the first brand-exclusive PPV held in the United States) on June 15, 2003. It hosted a live episode of SmackDown! on September 13, 2001, the first major entertainment event in the US after the September 11 attacks.

=== Notable concerts ===
Prior to the construction of Cynthia Woods Mitchell Pavilion and later, the Toyota Center, the Summit was the main Houston venue for large pop and rock music concerts. Before the Summit was opened, most large venue concerts were held at the Sam Houston Coliseum. Smaller concerts were held at Houston Music Hall or Hofheinz Pavilion.

Date	Artist	Opening act(s)	Tour / Concert name	Attendance	Revenue	Notes
November 20, 1975	The Who	Toots and the Maytals	The Who Tour 1975	—	—	The arena's first major rock concert. It was recorded and later released in 2012, as The Who: Live in Texas '75. It is also featured on the "30 Years of Maximum R&B" DVD set.
May 4, 1976	Wings	—	Wings Over the World tour	—	—	Paul McCartney and Wings' second stop on the band's landmark North American tour, which also marked the former Beatle's second US performance since 1966.
October 31, 1976	Parliament-Funkadelic	Bootsy's Rubber Band	P-Funk Earth Tour	—	—	The performance was recorded and released, as The Mothership Connection – Live from Houston in 1986 and later rereleased on DVD, as George Clinton: The Mothership Connection in 1998. A DVD of one of the opening acts, Bootsy's Rubber Band, was also released by P-Vine records.
November 6, 1976	Eagles	—	Hotel California Tour	—	—	
November 25, 1976	ZZ Top	Rory Gallagher	Worldwide Texas Tour	—	—	
November 26, 1976	ZZ Top	Rory Gallagher	Worldwide Texas Tour	—	—	
May 21, 1977	Led Zeppelin	—	Led Zeppelin North American Tour 1977	—	—	Bootleg recordings of this show exist.
May 23, 1977	Bad Company	—	—	—	—	
June 24–25, 1977	Aerosmith	—	Rocks Tour	—	—	Footage available on YouTube.
September 1–2, 1977	Kiss	Styx	Love Gun Tour	—	—	The presentations were recorded and are part of the first volume Kissology.
December 11, 1977	Queen	—	News of the World Tour	—	—	The presentation was recorded and the fast video version of "We Will Rock You" was filmed here and other parts of the show have surfaced on Queen documentaries and is available readily on bootleg.
October 22, 1978	Genesis (band)	—	...and then there were three... World Tour	16,800 / 16,800	—	This performance was the last show during the North American leg of the tour.
December 8, 1978	Bruce Springsteen & The E Street Band	—	Darkness Tour	12,003 / 15,000	$98,925	The show was released on DVD in 2010, as part of The Promise: The Darkness on the Edge of Town Story box set.
December 21, 1978	Grateful Dead		Shakedown Street tour			Setlist
June 30, 1979	Bee Gees	Sweet Inspirations	Spirits Having Flown Tour	16,654 / 16,654	$231,285	John Travolta, who was filming Urban Cowboy, made a special appearance at the show.
November 25, 1979	Billy Joel					Performed three songs from the yet-to-be-released "Glass Houses"
August 18, 1980	Fleetwood Mac	—	Tusk Tour	12,457		
December 9, 1980	Kansas	—	Audiovisions Tour	—		
July 2, 1981	Grateful Dead		Summer Tour 81'			Setlist
October 7, 1981	Little River Band	—	Time Exposure	—	—	The concert was filmed and released on videotape (and eventually DVD) as Live Exposure.
November 5–6, 1981	Journey	—	Escape Tour	34,904 / 34,904	$377,577	The show on the 5th was recorded for later broadcast on the King Biscuit Flower Hour.The show on the 6th was also recorded and shown on MTV, and part of the show was released as part of their Greatest Hits Live album, and later released in full as a CD/DVD package, entitled Live in Houston 1981: The Escape Tour, in November 2005.
October 10, 1984	Cyndi Lauper	The Bangles	Fun Tour	—	—	The performance at the Summit in Houston in October, 1984, provided the footage for her "Money Changes Everything" promotional video. The show was also broadcast locally over the radio that evening.
January 11–17, 1985	Prince & The Revolution	–	Purple Rain Tour	102,564 / 102,564	$1,708,690	
October 4, 1985	Mötley Crüe	—	Welcome to the Theatre of Pain Tour	—	—	The concert portion of the original video for their big hit "Home Sweet Home" was shot.
January 15–16, 1987	Genesis	—	Invisible Touch Tour	—	—	
April 8–10, 1988	Michael Jackson	—	Bad World Tour	—	—	Only a few songs have been released professionally.
July 14, 1988	Run-DMC	Public Enemy, DJ Jazzy Jeff & the Fresh Prince, EPMD, J. J. Fad	Run's House Tour	–	–	–
October 16, 1988	George Michael		The Faith Tour			
October 20, 1988	Grateful Dead	Southern Tour 88'				Setlist
June 11, 1989	N.W.A	Too Short; Kid 'n Play; Kwamé Sir Mix-a-Lot; J. J. Fad	Straight Outta Compton Tour	–	–	–
August 22, 1989	Metallica	The Cult	Damaged Justice	—	—	—
April 15–16, 1990	Janet Jackson	Chuckii Booker	Rhythm Nation World Tour 1990	27,082 / 30,000	$506,903	–
May 4–5, 1990	Madonna	Technotronic	Blond Ambition World Tour	31,427 / 31,427	$881,245	—
August 11, 1990	MC Hammer	After 7, Michel'le, Oaktown's 3.5.7	Please Hammer Don't Hurt 'Em World Tour			
November 21, 1990	MC Hammer	En Vogue, Vanilla Ice	Please Hammer Don't Hurt 'Em World Tour			
June 12, 1992	MC Hammer	Jodeci, TLC, Oaktown 357, Mary J. Blige	Too Legit to Quit World Tour			
June 13, 1992	MC Hammer	Jodeci, TLC, Oaktown 357, Mary J. Blige	Too Legit to Quit World Tour			
August 25, 1994	Whitney Houston	–	The Bodyguard World Tour	–	–	
September 30, 1994	Aerosmith	—	Get a Grip Tour	16,162 / 16,162	$434,700	The live portions of "Blind Man" were filmed at this show.
January 25, 1996	AC/DC	The Poor	Ballbreaker World Tour			
September 26, 1997	Mary J. Blige	Usher	Share My World Tour			
April 7–11, 1998	Garth Brooks		The Garth Brooks World Tour	81,039 / 81,039	$1,673,455	Brooks performed five sold-out concerts across five consecutive nights. The first show sold out in 11 minutes, prompting the addition of four more dates.
November 1, 1999	Limp Bizkit, Primus, Filter, Staind, Method Man & Redman		Family Values Tour 1999			
November 7, 1999	Ricky Martin	Jessica Simpson	Livin' la Vida Loca Tour			
February 8, 2001	Kid Rock	Buckcherry; Fuel	American Badass Tour	—	—	—
August 4, 2001	3LW Dream Jessica Simpson Eve Nelly and the St. Lunatics Destiny's Child		MTV's TRL Tour			
October 14, 2002	American Idol season 1 finalists	—	American Idols LIVE! Tour 2002	—	—	—
January 22, 2003	Shakira	—	Tour of the Mongoose	12,735 / 12,735	$702,205	—
November 22, 2003	ZZ Top	Los Lobos; Cross Canadian Ragweed	Beer Drinkers and Hell Raisers Tour	—	—	This was the last concert at the arena, before it was renovated into a church.

== From vacancy to church ==
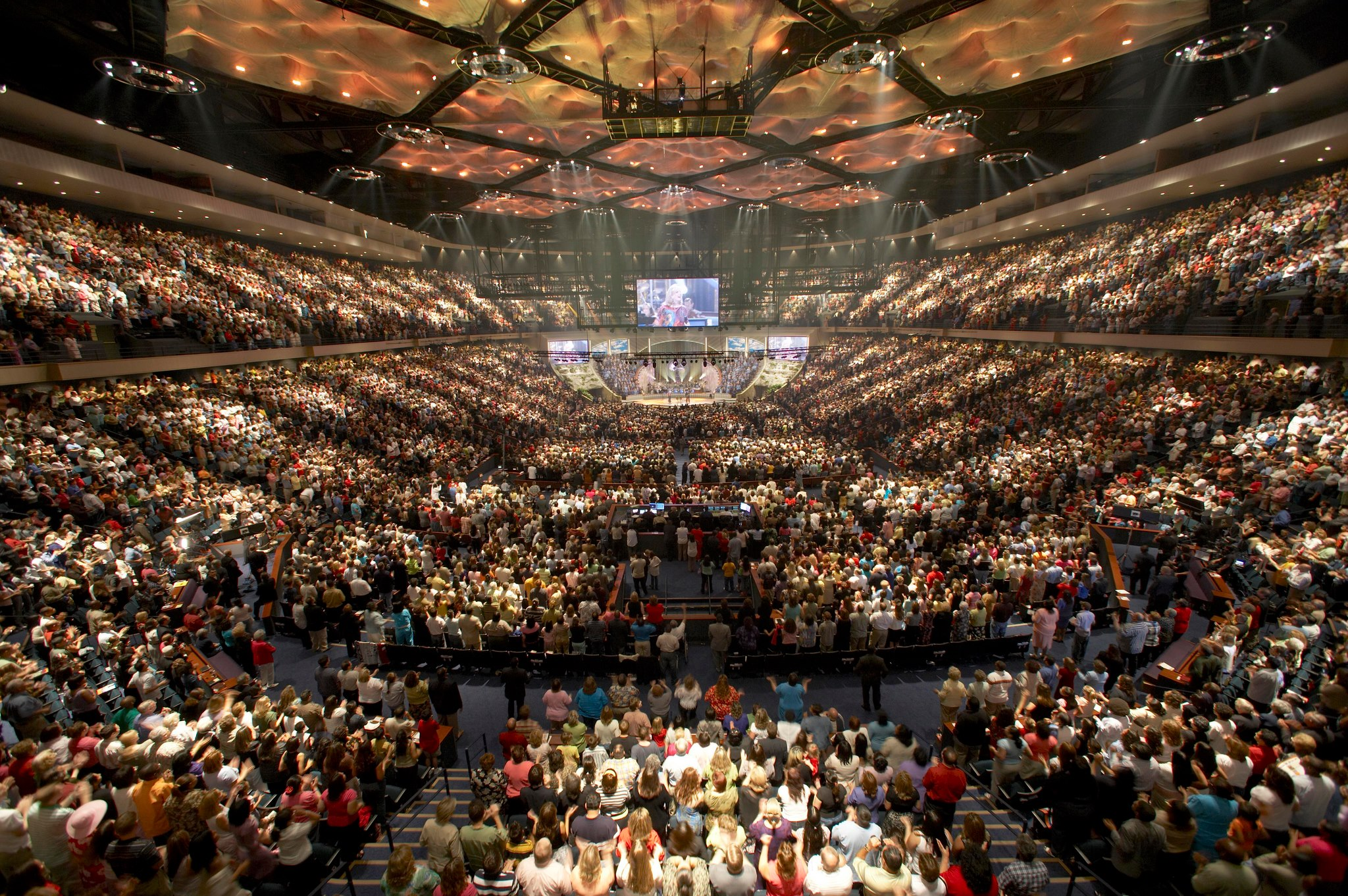
The church's interior, 2013

In 1998, it became the first Houston sports arena to sell its naming rights. The Arena Operating Company entered into a five-year, $900,000 per year deal with then Houston-based Compaq Computer Corporation to change the name of the venue from The Summit to Compaq Center, keeping that name even after the acquisition of Compaq by Hewlett-Packard in 2002 (there was another arena named the Compaq Center in San Jose, California around this time, but has since been renamed the SAP Center). The length of the agreement was significant, because in 2003 the lease that Arena Operating Company held on Compaq Center would expire, and the tenants of the building were lobbying vigorously for the construction of a new downtown venue to replace the aging and undersized arena.

When the sports teams moved to the new Toyota Center in 2003, the City of Houston leased the arena to Lakewood Church, a megachurch, which invested $95 million in renovations to convert the arena into the current configuration of seats and rooms for its needs; the renovations took over 15 months to complete, and the renovations included adding five stories to add more capacity. During the lease, Lakewood Church had an exclusive agreement with the City of Houston for use of the former Summit, and as such, invested heavily in the structure for its use. In 2001, the church signed a 30-year lease with the city.

In March 2010, the church announced that it would buy the campus outright from the city of Houston for $7.5 million, terminating the lease after 7 years. Marty Aaron, a real estate appraiser, said that although an "untrained eye" would "wonder how Lakewood Church purchased the Compaq Center for $7.5 million, [actually] this is not really an arms-length sale from the city to Lakewood Church." Aaron explained that the church "put a phenomenal amount of money into the facility after the lease was initially structured, and it's really not fair that someone else would get the benefit of that." Aaron added that converting the property to a stadium-oriented facility "would probably cost as much or more than it took to turn it into a church, and right now there are probably not very many organizations that would be willing to step forward and do that." The Houston City Council was scheduled to vote on the matter on Wednesday March 24, 2010. City council delayed the vote. On March 30 of that year, Ronald Green, the city's chief financial officer, said that he approved of the sale of the building. On March 31, 2010, the Houston City Council voted 13–2 to sell the property to Lakewood.

Preceded by Hofheinz Pavilion	Home of the Houston Rockets; 1975–2002	Succeeded by Toyota Center
Preceded by Sam Houston Coliseum	Home of the Houston Aeros; 1975–1979	Succeeded by last arena
Preceded by first arena	Home of the Houston Summit; 1978–1980	Succeeded by Baltimore Civic Center
Preceded by Kungliga tennishallen Stockholm	Masters Cup; Venue; 1976	Succeeded by Madison Square Garden; New York
Preceded by first arena	Home of the Houston Aeros; 1994–2003	Succeeded by Toyota Center
Preceded by first arena	Home of the Houston Hotshots; 1993–1997–1999	Succeeded by AstroArena
Preceded by first arena	Home of the Houston Thunderbears; 1996–2001	Succeeded by last arena
Preceded by first arena	Home of the Houston Comets; 1997–2002	Succeeded by Toyota Center
Preceded by 7317 E. Houston Road	Home of Lakewood Church; Central Campus; 2005–present	Succeeded by current
