= The Mothership Connection – Live from Houston =

The Mothership Connection — Live from Houston

Studio album with live tracks by George Clinton and Parliament-Funkadelic
- Released: 1986
- Recorded: 1976/1982/1985
- Genre: Funk
- Length: 40:25
- Label: Capitol
- Producers: George Clinton, Alan Douglas, Archie Ivy, Ted Currier, Garry Shider

George Clinton chronology
R&B Skeletons in the Closet (1986)	The Mothership Connection — Live from Houston (1986)	The Best Of George Clinton (1986)

The Mothership Connection — Live from Houston is an album by George Clinton and Parliament-Funkadelic. It was released on the Capitol Records label in 1986.

The Mothership Connection — Live from Houston is divided evenly between studio and live performances. Side one consists of a live recording made at a concert at The Summit in Houston, Texas, on October 31, 1976. Side two is made up of previously released material from Clinton's solo albums, including the hit single "Atomic Dog". In conjunction with the release of The Mothership Connection — Live from Houston, a videotape of the live performance was released. The video also included music videos for several studio tracks. The live performance was released in its entirety in 1998 by Pioneer Artists.

== Track listing ==
Side one - Choice Excerpts From The Mothership Connection
No.	Title	Length
1.	"Let's Take It To The Stage / Do That Stuff"	6:55
2.	"Mothership Connection / Doctor Funkenstein"	8:19
3.	"Get Off Your Ass And Jam / Night Of The Thumpasorous People"	8:50
Total length:		24:04

Side 2 - Choice Excerpts From Previously Released Albums
No.	Title	Length
1.	"Atomic Dog"	4:15
2.	"Double Oh-Oh"	5:47
3.	"Bulletproof"	6:19
Total length:		16:21 40:25

== See also ==
- George Clinton: The Mothership Connection
