= Queer as Folk soundtracks =

The Queer as Folk soundtracks are the official musical accompaniment to the 2000s North American television series Queer as Folk. Five CDs were released overall, each one covering from the first season, to the final. Each soundtrack featured the more prominent remixes from the show, with some songs not making it onto the soundtracks. The first two soundtracks were released by RCA Victor, while the rest were released by The Silver Label.

The first two editions focus solely on dance tracks played in the nightclub Babylon on the show, while the third edition is a two-disc set which features some alternative and rock music as well. The soundtrack in the fourth edition is more somber, reflecting the serious themes explored in season four.

The first 3 seasons contain the opening theme, "Spunk" by Greek Buck, which was used only for the first 3 seasons of the show. The 4th season soundtrack includes the new theme "Cue the Pulse to Begin" by Burnside Project, which was used for the final two seasons of the series. The opening credits changed also.

== Season 1 (2001) ==
1. Greek Buck – "Spunk (Synth-Version)" – 0:29
2. Barry Harris – "Dive In the Pool (feat. Pepper Mashay)" – 3:55
3. Full Frontal – "You Think You're a Man (7" Radio Edit)" – 4:00
4. Heather Small – "Proud" – 4:27
5. Kristine W – "Lovin' You" – 3:30
6. Alcazar – "Crying at the Discoteque (Radio Edit)" – 3:50
7. Jay-Jay Johanson – "Suffering" – 4:46
8. Mint Royale – "Shake Me (Vocal Edit)" – 4:05
9. B-U – "Summerfire (Radio Edit)" – 3:25
10. Antiloop – "Start Rockin' (Radio Edit)" – 3:26
11. Love Inc. – "Do Ya (Feel the Love)" – 3:49
12. Katty B. – "Let's Hear It for the Boy (Factory Main Mix)" – 5:31
13. Carole Pope – "High School Confidential" – 3:14
14. Touch and Go – "Straight To...Number One (Dreamcatcher's Mix)" – 3:37
15. Greek Buck – "Spunk (Thank You Version)" – 0:29

== Season 2 (2002) ==
1. Kosheen – "Hide U (John Creamer & Stephane K. Remix)" – 5:07
2. Deborah Cox – "Absolutely Not (Chanel Club Mix)" – 4:46
3. Kim English – "Everyday (Hex Hector & Mac Quayle Club Mix)" – 4:38
4. DJ Disciple – "Caught Up (feat. Mia Cox) [Guido Osario Vocal Mix]" – 4:24
5. Elle Patrice – "Rising" – 4:23
6. Satoshi Tomiie – "Sneaky One (feat. Deanna)" – 4:14
7. Daft Punk – "Harder, Better, Faster, Stronger (Pete Heller's Stylus Remix)" – 4:59
8. The Chemical Brothers – "Star Guitar (Pete Heller's Expanded Mix)" – 5:00
9. Etta James – "Miss You (Illicit Remix Edit)" – 5:02
10. Sarah McLachlan – "Plenty (Fade Mix)" – 5:04
11. Delerium – "Underwater (feat. Rani) [Mauve's Dark Vocal Mix]" – 4:59
12. Mandalay – "Beautiful (Calderone After Hour Mix)" – 5:07

== Season 3 (2003) ==
=== Disc 1 ===
1. Murk vs. Kristine W – "Some Lovin' (Peter Rauhofer Mix)" – 10:41
2. iiO – "At the End (The Scumfrog Remix)" – 4:47
3. The Roc Project – "Never (Past Tense) [feat. Tina Arena] {Tiësto Mix}" – 6:36
4. Gioia – "From the Inside (Junior Vasquez Mix)" – 8:15
5. Yoko Ono – "Walking On Thin Ice (Danny Tenaglia Club Mix)" – 4:58
6. Divine – "Native Love (Step By Step)" – 4:23
7. Namtrak vs. Chris Zippel – "Viva Colombia (Cha Cha) [NamZip Club Mix]" – 4:21
8. Cassius – "The Sound of Violence (Dancefloor Killa Mix)" – 5:00

=== Disc 2 ===
1. Sneaker Pimps – "Loretta Young Silks" – 6:00
2. Matthew Good – "Weapon" – 4:56
3. The Soundtrack of Our Lives – "Infra Riot" – 4:47
4. Pete Townshend – "Rough Boys" – 4:02
5. Underworld – "Sola Sistim" – 6:28
6. Broken Social Scene – "Lover's Spit" – 6:07

== Season 4 (2004) ==
1. Burnside Project – "Cue the Pulse to Begin" – 4:02
2. Suede – "Attitude" – 3:05
3. Jason Nevins – "I'm the Main Man" – 2:58
4. Goldfrapp – "Train" – 4:05
5. Eels – "Love of the Loveless" – 3:31
6. Ima Robot – "Scream" – 3:51
7. The Reindeer Section – "You Are My Joy" – 3:44
8. The Uncut – "Understanding the New Violence" – 4:05
9. TV On the Radio – "Satellite" – 4:31
10. Andrea Menard – "If I Were a Man" – 3:22
11. Circlesquare – "7 Minutes" – 4:21
12. Origene – "Sanctuary" – 3:25
13. Kodo – "Strobe's Nanafushi (Satori Mix)" – 4:59
14. Black – "Wonderful Life" – 4:45

== Season 5 (2005) ==
1. Scissor Sisters – "The Skins" – 2:52
2. Geri Halliwell – "Ride It (Hex Hector 12" Mix)" – 5:07
3. DV Roxx – "Hardcore Mutha Fucka" – 4:57
4. Fatboy Slim – "Jin Go Lo Ba" – 4:42
5. Ultra Naté – "Free (Jason Nevins Mix)" – 4:39
6. Madeleine Peyroux – "Dance Me to the End of Love" – 3:57
7. The Charlatans – "My Beautiful Friend (Lionrock Mix)" – 5:03
8. Superpitcher – "Fever" – 4:59
9. PJ Harvey – "This Mess We're In" – 3:55
10. Marilyn Manson – "Personal Jesus" – 4:08
11. DJ Rhythm – "Drama (Warren Clark Club Mix)" – 5:37
12. Africanism All Stars – "Summer Moon" – 4:51
13. Cyndi Lauper – "Shine (Babylon Mix)" – 4:24
14. Heather Small – "Proud (Peter Presta QAF V Mix)" – 5:01

== Queer As Folk - Club Babylon (2005) ==
=== Disc 1: Babylon ===
1. Book of Love – "Boy (Original Mix)" – 3:16
2. Ultra Naté – "Free (Oscar G Space Anthem))" – 4:49
3. Bronski Beat – "Smalltown Boy (Original Mix))" – 4:56
4. Morel – "True (The Faggot Is You) (Deep Dish Mix)" – 4:41
5. Sneaker Pimps – "Spin Spin Sugar (Armand Van Helden Mix)" – 6:11
6. Kristine W – "Fly Again (Scumfrog Club Mix)" – 6:38
7. Amuka – "Appreciate Me (Trip To Paradise Mix)" – 4:54
8. Narcotic Thrust – "Safe From Harm (Peter Rauhofer Mix)" – 5:27
9. Peter Rauhofer + Pet Shop Boys = The Collaboration – "Break 4 Love (Friburn + Urik Tribal Mix)" – 6:33
10. Barry Harris featuring Pepper Mashay – "Dive In The Pool (X-Union Mix)" – 5:43

=== Disc 2: Beyond Babylon ===
1. Suzanne Palmer – "Home (Offer Nissim Remix)" – 7:19
2. Kristine W – "The Wonder Of It All (Offer Nissim Remix)" – 6:55
3. Friburn + Urik – "I Need You" – 5:55
4. Murk – "Doesn't Really Matter (Friscia & Lamboy Remix)" – 6:38
5. Carl Cox featuring Hannah Robinson – "Give Me Your Love (Valentino Kanzyani Remix)" – 6:35
6. Loleatta Holloway – "Stand Up (Hott 22 Remix)" – 5:05
7. Inaya Day – "Lift It Up (DJ Paulo & Jamie J. Sanchez Mix)" – 6:01
8. Afrika Bambaataa & The Millennium Of The Gods – "B More Shake (FC Nond Remix)" – 2:42
9. Rachel Panay – "Back To Love (Friscia & Lamboy Vocal Anthem Mix)" – 5:24
10. Gadjo – "So Many Times (Antoine Clamaran Remix)" – 5:03
