= Sheila Horne =

American musician

- Born: Sheila Horne; Syracuse, New York, U.S.
- Occupation: Singer-songwriter
- Years active: 1978–present
- Formerly of: Brides of Funkenstein; Parliament-Funkadelic

Sheila Horne (also known professionally as Sheila Brody, Blackwood, and Amuka which is a name that producer/remixer Jahkey B created for other projects as in Jahkey B presents Amuka) is an American singer and songwriter best known for her work as a member of the Brides of Funkenstein, Parliament-Funkadelic, and for her solo career in dance and house music.

== Early life and career ==
Sheila Horne was born in Syracuse, New York. She began singing as a teenager and moved to Detroit, where she connected with George Clinton and the Parliament-Funkadelic collective in the late 1970s.

== The Brides of Funkenstein ==
In 1978, Horne joined the P-Funk universe as a backing vocalist, initially performing as a “Bridesmaid” for the Brides of Funkenstein, an all-female group formed by George Clinton. After founding member Lynn Mabry left the group, Horne became a full member alongside Dawn Silva and Jeanette McGruder.

She sang co-lead vocals on the Brides’ second album, Never Buy Texas from a Cowboy, which has since been acclaimed as one of the strongest P-Funk spin-off records. One single from the album led by Horne, "Didn't Mean To Fall in Love", won a rhythm and blues award for "Best New Female Group" in 1981. The group won a Cashbox Rhythm & Blues award for Best New Female Artist in 1979. Horne toured extensively with the Brides and Parliament-Funkadelic during this period.

== Work with Parliament-Funkadelic and Rick James ==
Following her time with the Brides, Horne continued recording with George Clinton and the P-Funk All-Stars. She contributed backing vocals to Parliament’s hit single Atomic Dog.

In 1981, she joined Rick James’ band as an original member of his Mary Jane Girls touring ensemble. She performed backup vocals on James’ Street Songs tour but left the group after a dispute and later won a legal case against James.

== Songwriting and other collaborations ==
During the mid-1980s, Horne, credited under her married name Sheila Washington, co-wrote several songs with George Clinton. She co-wrote Do Fries Go with That Shake? from Clinton’s album R&B Skeletons in the Closet. She also contributed to the Federation of Tackheads project.

She collaborated with the funk band Aurra alongside her then-husband Steve Washington, recording Satisfaction in the mid-1980s, which was released in 2013.

In the 1980s and 1990s, Horne performed as a session and touring vocalist for various artists, including Cyndi Lauper and Was (Not Was). She also continued to appear with the P-Funk All-Stars.

== Blackwood and international dance career ==
In the late 1990s, Horne reinvented herself under the alias Blackwood and found success in the European dance scene. She fronted the Italian dance-pop project Blackwood and released the album Friday Night in 1998. The single "Peace" reached number one on the Italian pop charts.

She also recorded the song "Everything Changes" for the 1999 Pokémon 2.B.A. Master soundtrack, credited as Sheila Brody.

== Amuka and Billboard Dance Chart success ==
In the early 2000s, Horne launched her solo dance career as Amuka which is a name that producer/remixer Jahkey B created for other projects as in Jahkey B presents AmukaAmuka, written and produced by jahkey B and collaborating with DJ Peter Rauhofer. *69 records released the single "Appreciate Me" in 2003, which peaked at number eight on the Billboard Hot Dance Club Play chart and appeared on the Queer As Folk: Club Babylon soundtrack.

Her follow-up single, "U Ain’t That Good," reached number three on the same chart in 2004. Amuka scored a number one Billboard dance hit with "I Want More (Cling On to Me)" in 2006 and continued to release dance singles that charted in the Top 10.

== Later career and recent work ==
Horne contributed vocals to Public Enemy’s albums The Evil Empire of Everything (2012) and Man Plans God Laughs (2015). She has also released music under her own name and with the dance collective Discomind.

She has stated she is working on a memoir titled Dancing in Heels which will cover her multi-genre career.

== Discography (selected) ==
- Never Buy Texas from a Cowboy (1979) – Brides of Funkenstein
- R&B Skeletons in the Closet (1986) – George Clinton (co-writer)
- Federation of Tackheads (1985) – contributor
- Satisfaction (recorded 1984, released 2013) – Aurra
- Friday Night (1998) – as Blackwood
- Pokémon: 2.B.A. Master (1999) – "Everything Changes"
- The Fresh Turnout (2003) – Discomind
- Multiple dance singles as Amuka: Appreciate Me, U Ain’t That Good, I Want More (Cling On to Me)
