= The Horny Horns =

American band

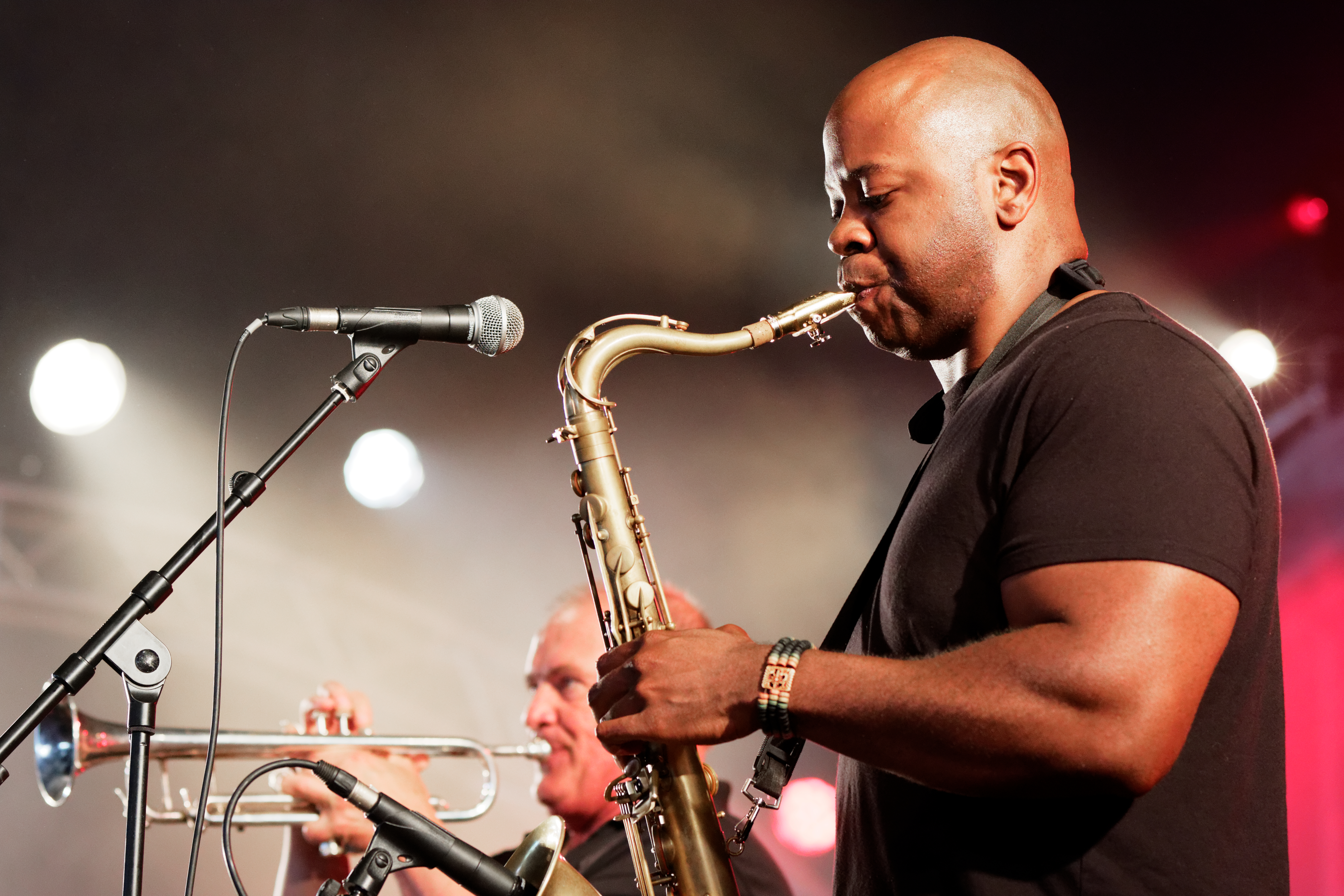
Fred Wesley & the new JB's in concert on the Seb marquee stage during the Bout du Monde 2016 festival in Crozon in Finistère (France)

The Horny Horns were a horn section associated with Parliament-Funkadelic and Bootsy's Rubber Band led by trombonist Fred Wesley. The group also featured saxophonist Maceo Parker and Rick Gardner and Richard "Kush" Griffith on trumpets.

While they are best known for their contributions to other P-Funk projects, The Horny Horns also recorded two albums under their own name, A Blow for Me, A Toot for You (1977) and Say Blow By Blow Backwards (1979). A compilation of unreleased tracks was released in 1994 on the CD The Final Blow.

They have frequently played with other notable artists, such as Red Hot Chili Peppers, on Freaky Styley's "If You Want Me to Stay", and on Deee-Lite's 1990 hit "Groove Is in the Heart".
