= Invasion of the Booty Snatchers =

Studio album by Parlet
- Released: June 1979
- Recorded: 1979
- Studios: Alpha, Richmond; United, Detroit
- Genres: Funk, disco
- Length: 40:26
- Label: Casablanca
- Producers: George Clinton, Ron Dunbar

Parlet chronology
Pleasure Principle (album) (1978)	Invasion of the Booty Snatchers (1979)	Play Me or Trade Me (1980)

Professional ratings
Review scores
Source	Rating
AllMusic	4/5 stars
Smash Hits	5/10

Invasion of the Booty Snatchers is the second studio album by the P-Funk spin off group Parlet. Released in June 1979, it was the final Parlet album to feature Mallia Franklin and the first to feature Shirley Hayden and Janice Evans. The album was produced by George Clinton and Ron Dunbar. The title is a play on Invasion of the Body Snatchers, replacing "Body" with "Booty". The cover art was created by Ronald "Stozo" Edwards. The album's highest-charting single was "Riding High". The album leaned more toward disco, in an effort to keep up with musical trends.

Invasion of the Booty Snatchers was re-released in Japan on the Casablanca/Polystar label in 1992 and in Germany on Universal in 2003. On July 30, 2013, Real Gone Music in the U.S. reissued both Pleasure Principle and Invasion of the Booty Snatchers, featuring liner notes by former P-Funk minister of information Tom Vickers.

== Track listing ==
1. "Riding High" (Ron Dunbar, Donny Sterling) – released as 7-inch single Casablanca NB 975 and 12-inch single Casablanca NBD 20161 DJ 7:40
2. "No Rump to Bump" (Donny Sterling, Ron Dunbar, Jim Vitti, George Clinton) 6:10
3. "Don't Ever Stop (Lovin' Me, Needin' Me)" (Glenn Goins, Ron Dunbar, George Clinton) – released as single Casablanca NB 995 7:13
4. "Booty Snatchers" (Ron Dunbar, George Clinton, Phillipina Bishop) 5:50
5. "You're Leaving" (Gary Cooper, George Clinton, Ron Dunbar) 6:26
6. "Huff-n-Puff" (Ron Dunbar, Michael Hampton) 7:17

== Personnel ==
- Guitars: Gordon Carlton, Jerome Ali, Phelps Collins, Bootsy Collins, Michael Hampton, Kevin D. Oliver, Tim Moore, Glenn Goins, Garry Shider
- Bass: Bootsy Collins, Donnie R. Sterling, Jeff Bunn, Jimmy Ali
- Drums: Frank Waddy, Gary Cooper, Bootsy Collins, Kenny Colton
- Percussion: Carl Small, Larry Fratangelo
- Keyboards/Synthesizers: Bernie Worrell, Ernestro Wilson, Joel Johnson, Manon Saulsby
- Horns: Benny Cowan, Greg Boyer, Greg Thomas
- Additional vocals: George Clinton, Mallia Franklin, Donnie Sterling, Cheryl James, Ray Davis, Ron Ford, Robert Johnson, Gary Cooper, Gordon Carlton, Janice Carlton
