= Jeanette Washington =

American vocalist

Jeanette Washington is a funk vocalist best known as a member of the band Parliament.

Washington appeared as a background singer on recordings by James Brown in 1975. That year, she joined Parliament with Debbie Wright, becoming the first female members of the group. She recorded with Parliament (1975–1980) and Funkadelic (1978–1980), both featuring George Clinton, and with the Sweat Band featuring Bootsy Collins and Maceo Parker (1980).

Washington formed the female spin-off band Parlet in 1978 with Wright and Mallia Franklin for their first album Pleasure Principle. She recorded the group's remaining two albums Invasion Of the Booty Snatchers in 1979 and Play Me Or Trade Me in 1980 with Shirley Hayden and Janice Evans. Washington is the only Parlet member to have remained in the band for the duration of the group's career.

Washington left Parliament in 1980. She recorded with Dawn Silva in 2000.
