= Jeanette McGruder =

American musician (born 1954)

Jeanette McGruder (born November 8, 1954) is a singer, comedian, sketch actress, and writer, who has performed with P-Funk, Brides Of Funkenstein, and Lynn Mabry and Dawn Silva. In 1979, she recorded with Silva and Sheila Horne on "Never Buy Texas From A Cowboy". McGruder changed her professional name to Satori Shakoor in mid-1980s and became a comedian and sketch actress on the Canadian show Thick and Thin.

== Early life and career ==
McGruder was born in Detroit, Michigan, in 1954, and began singing and studying the violin as a child. Taught by her stepmother, she sang in her junior high choir and joined a female trio called New Dawn, which performed at nightclubs and one Black Panthers rally. She became a professional violinist aged 15 as well as playing in her high school orchestra at Cass Technical High School. While still at school, Jeanette also played in various orchestras and bands in and around the city of Detroit, including The Electrifying Strings, a jazz string group with Earl Klugh (guitar), Cecil "Van" Cephus (keyboards), and Ralph Armstrong (bass). She played in studio sessions on recordings for local Detroit artists, and earned money for occasional performances at United Sound Studios for Motown Records.

== Education and later musical career ==
In 1972, upon entering the music department of Michigan State University (MSU), McGruder opted against pursuing a career as a violinist, and instead majored in voice. In 1974, she performed "We Shall Overcome" at an event honoring Coretta Scott King.

In 1978, after four years of studying at MSU and two years of singing in local bands, McGruder moved to New York City and began auditioning for Broadway. Later that year, her friend Overton Loyd told her about an audition for the Brides of Funkenstein, a new group created by George Clinton. McGruder returned to Detroit and got a job as a backing singer for Parliament-Funkadelic, and the original Brides of Funkenstein, Dawn Silva and Lynn Mabry, whose album Funk the Walk (1978) was in the charts. Mabry left the group within a year, leaving Dawn Silva to record a second album alone. George Clinton brought McGruder and Sheila Horne into the foreground, and the Brides of Funkenstein became a three-piece group, recording their second album, Never Buy Texas From A Cowboy (1979), which was voted into Billboard's "Top 50 albums" of all time in 2002. One single from the album, "Didn't Mean To Fall in Love", won a rhythm and blues award in 1981 for "Best New Female Group".

The Brides of Funkenstein disbanded in 1981. McGruder became the lyricist and lead singer for a Detroit rock band called Cherubim, which recorded one album and played in Japan.

A dramatic and humorous monologue featuring McGruder, now known as Satori Shakoor, was released on The Moth on January 21, 2013.

At the 13th Gemini Awards in 1998, she and her Thick and Thin castmates Ronnie Edwards, Kedar Brown and Kenny Robinson received an ensemble nomination for Best Performance in a Comedy Program or Series.

== Television Career ==
Shakoor is the host of Detroit Performs: Live From Marygrove, which airs on Detroit Public Television.

== Personal life ==
In 1982, McGruder had a son, Noah Shakoor. In 2002, Noah and his wife, Fonda Hollowell, had a daughter.
