= Jerome Brailey =

American drummer

- Jerome Bigfoot in NYC

Background information
- Also known as: Jerome Bigfoot Brailey, Jerome Bigfoot
- Born: Jerome Eugene Brailey; August 20, 1950 (age 75); Richmond, Virginia, U.S.
- Genres: R&B, funk, rock
- Occupations: Drummer, Songwriter, Producer, Vocalist
- Instruments: Drums, Percussions, Vocals
- Years active: 1968–present
- Labels: Casablanca, Arista, Westbound, Columbia, Rykodisc, P-Vine

Jerome Eugene "Bigfoot" Brailey (born August 20, 1950) is an American drummer, best known for his work with P-Funk, which included the bands Parliament, Funkadelic, and numerous related projects. Brailey is a member of the Rock and Roll Hall of Fame, inducted in 1997 with fifteen other members of Parliament-Funkadelic. He has also had a long career as a session drummer for musicians in a variety of genres.

== Career ==
Jerome Brailey started performing around 1968 with the R&B groups the Unifics, Five Stairsteps, and the Chambers Brothers. George Clinton saw him performing with the Chambers Brothers and invited him to join the P-Funk collective. Brailey joined P-Funk in 1975 and co-wrote one of Parliament's biggest hits, “Give Up the Funk (Tear the Roof off the Sucker)" with Clinton and Bootsy Collins. He also played on many of the most popular recordings by both Parliament and Funkadelic during this period.

Brailey left the P-Funk organization in 1978 due to disagreement with Clinton's management, and began working closely with Glenn Goins, who had also left P-Funk that year. Goins had formed the funk band Quazar, abd began recording a debut album for Arista Records, but died at age 24 before its completion. Brailey helped the band complete the album, which was released in late 1978. Based on another idea that he had shared with Goins, Brailey then formed the funk band Mutiny and signed it to Columbia Records. The album Mutiny on the Mamaship was released in 1979, followed by Funk Plus the One later the same year.

Brailey was inducted into the Rock and Roll Hall of Fame as a member of Parliament-Funkadelic in 1997. That organization later ranked him as one of the 50 best drummers that have been inducted into the Hall. In 2016, Rolling Stone ranked Brailey at #68 in its list of “The 100 Greatest Drummers of All Time,” citing his "steady kick drum, shifty hi-hat action and intricately unpredictable snare pattern." In 2018, Brailey was included in a Grammy Lifetime Achievement Award presented to Parliament-Funkadelic.

== Selected discography ==
=== Parliament / Funkadelic (1975–1979) ===
- Parliament: Mothership Connection (1975)
- Funkadelic: Tales of Kidd Funkadelic (1976)
- Funkadelic: Hardcore Jollies (1976)
- Parliament: The Clones of Dr. Funkenstein (1976)
- Fuzzy Haskins: A Whole Nother Thang (1976)
- Parliament: Funkentelechy Vs. the Placebo Syndrome (1977)
- Bootsy's Rubber Band: Ahh... The Name Is Bootsy, Baby! (1977)
- Eddie Hazel: Games, Dames and Guitar Thangs (1977)
- Parliament: Live: P-Funk Earth Tour (1977)
- Fred Wesley and the Horny Horns featuring Maceo Parker: A Blow for Me, a Toot to You (1977)
- Bootsy's Rubber Band: Bootsy? Player of the Year (1978)
- Funkadelic: One Nation Under a Groove (1978)
- The Brides of Funkenstein: Funk or Walk (1978)
- Fuzzy Haskins: Radio Active (1978)
- Parlet: Pleasure Principle (1978)
- Funkadelic: Uncle Jam Wants You (1979)
- Fred Wesley & The Horny Horns: Say Blow by Blow Backwards (1979)
- Fred Wesley & The Horny Horns: The Final Blow (recorded 1976–1979) (1994)
- Eddie Hazel: Rest in P (recorded 1975–1977) (1994)

=== Mutiny ===
- Mutiny on the Mamaship (1979)
- Funk Plus the One (1980)
- A Night Out with the Boys (1983)
- Aftershock 2005 (1996)
- How's Your Loose Booty? (compilation) (2000)
- Funk Rd. (2013)
- Mutiny (2-CD Deluxe Edition) (2015)
- Black Hat Daddy & The Silver Comb Gang (recorded 1981 / released 2023)

=== Quazar ===
- Quazar (1978)

=== Chambers Brothers ===
- "Right Move" (Avco Records 1975)

=== Five Stairsteps ===
- Five Stairsteps & Cubie Featuring Clarence Jr. – "The Shadow Of Your Love / Bad News" (Buddah Records 1968)
- The Five Stairsteps "O-o-h Child" (Buddha Records 1970), Bernard Purdie or Jerome Brailey.

=== The Unifics ===
- Sittin In At The Court Of Love (Kapp Records 1968)

=== Parliament / Funkadelic Compilations ===
- Funkadelic: Music for Your Mother (Import / March 1993)
- Parliament: Tear The Roof Off: 1974-1980 (1993)
- Parliament: Greatest Hits 1972-1993 (1994)
- Bootsy Back in the Day: The Best of Bootsy (1994)
- The Best of Parliament: Give Up the Funk (1995)
- Mothership Connection: Newberg Session (1995)
- Parliament / Funkadelic (Live): 1976-1993 (1996)
- Funkadelic: Ultimate (1999)
- Parliament: The 20th Century Masters / Millennium Collection: (2000)
- Bootsy Collins: Glory B da' Funk's on Me (2001)
- Parliament: Funked Up: The Very Best of... (2002)
- George Clinton / Parliament Funkadelic: Mothership Connection (DVD / 2002)
- Funkadelic / Motor City Madness: The Ultimate Funkadelic Westbound Compilation (2004)
- Funkadelic: Under a Groove (Import / Box Set: March 2004)
- Funkadelic: Whole Funk & Nothing But the Funk / Definitive (2005)
- Parliament: Gold: Original Recordings Remastered 1974-1980 (2005)
- Funkadelic: Funk Gets Stronger (Import, Reissued, Remastered / April 2006)
- Parliament / The Casablanca Years 1974-1980 (2007)
- Parliament / Funkadelic: The Mothership Connection Live 1976 (2008)
- Standing on the Verge: The Best of Funkadelic (2009)
- Parliament: ICON (2011)
- Funkadelic: Cosmic Funkers (2011)
- Funkadelic: Reworked By Detroiters (Import / December 2017)
- Parliament / Funkadelic: (Live) Madison Square Garden 1977 (Import / December 2017)

=== New York / Collision Music Years ===
- Billy Bass Nelson: Out of the Dark (O.G. Funk) (1993)
- Liu Sola: Blues in the East (1994)
- Buckethead: Giant Robot (1994)
- Tawl Ross: a.k.a. Detrimental Vasoline (1995)
- Dave Stewart: Greetings from the Gutter (1995)
- Jah Wobble: Heaven and Earth (1995)
- Peter's Rock Mass Choir: Message from the Rock (1995)
- Funkcronomicon: Axiom Funk (1995)
- Various Artists: Altered Beats: Assassin Knowledges (1996)
- Material: Intonarumori (1998)
- James Blood Ulmer: Blue Blood (2001)
- Lucky Peterson: Black Midnight Sun (2003)

=== Hip-Hop genre / Jazz Deluxe / Digital Music Mix ===
- A Different Kind Of Christmas: Various Artists (2012)
- Jonathan Hay, Mike Smith, King Tech, Jerome Bigfoot & Various Artists - When Music Worlds Collide (2015)
- Jonathan Hay & Mike Smith: (Deluxe) When Music World Collide (2016)
- Smith and Hay: Jazz (September 2017)
- Smith and Hay: Jazz (Deluxe) (Jan. 2018

=== Contributions / Sampled Chronology ===
- Osiris: O-Zone (1979)
- The Sequence: (Funky Sound) Tear the Roof Off (1981)
- M.C. Hammer: Turn This Mutha Out (Let’s Get It Started) (1988)
- Gerardo: We Want The Funk (1991)
- Snoop Dogg: What's My Name? (Doggystyle) (Interpolations from "Give Up The Funk) (1993)
- Snoop Dogg: Undercova Funk (Give Up the Funk) (Undercover Brother) (2002)
- Dawn Sheppard: The Dawn Of A New Day (2003)
- Mello Bondz: Billion Dollar Babies (2007)
- BIGFOOT & Bondz: The Lovinator Experiment (Intro) (2010)
- Glee: The Music, Volume 3 Showstoppers (Soundtrack Album) (2010)
- Moneyball (soundtrack): Give Up The Funk (2011)
- Lyrica Garrett: Summer Time Love (Ready) (2019)
