= Tiki Fulwood =

American drummer (1944-1979)

Ramon "Tiki" Fulwood (May 23, 1944 – October 29, 1979) was an American musician. He was the drummer for the funk bands Parliament and Funkadelic, as well as a member of the Rock and Roll Hall of Fame, inducted in 1997 with fifteen other members of Parliament-Funkadelic.

== Career ==
Fulwood was born in Philadelphia, Pennsylvania in 1944. In the late 1960s, Fulwood was the house drummer for the Uptown Theater in Philadelphia when he met guitarist Eddie Hazel. Hazel and bassist Billy Bass Nelson were on tour as musical support for the doo wop vocal group The Parliaments. Hazel and Nelson convinced group leader George Clinton to add Fulwood to the group, where he replaced drummer Harvey McGee. Fulwood, Hazel, and Nelson formed the core of The Parliaments musical backing group, which later became known as Funkadelic. Fulwood first quit Funkadelic in 1971 following a pay dispute with Clinton, but played with Parliament-Funkadelic sporadically thereafter.

Fulwood also played drums in the Tyrone Davis band and the Chairmen of the Board between stints with P-Funk, and later was briefly employed by Miles Davis. Fulwood died of stomach cancer in 1979. In 2016, Rolling Stone ranked Fulwood at no. 39 in its 100 greatest drummers of all time, and in 2013 Spin named ranked him at no. 76 in its 100 greatest drummers of alternative music.
