= Lynn Mabry =

American singer

- Born: March 21, 1958 (age 68); Vallejo, California, U.S.
- Genres: R&B; funk
- Occupation: Singer-songwriter
- Instrument: Vocals
- Years active: 1977–present

Lynn Mabry (born March 21, 1958) is an American singer.

== Early life ==
Born in Vallejo, California, Mabry's mother enjoyed playing piano and her father was a choir director and radio DJ. They divorced when she was 3 years old.

== Career ==
She got her start in Sly and the Family Stone, along with Dawn Silva. In 1977, she joined P-Funk. The following year, Mabry and Silva became the original Brides of Funkenstein, releasing their first album Funk Or Walk. Mabry became pregnant and left the band in 1979. She gave birth to a daughter named Akasha Larain Morrison in December 1979 (father is Walter "Junie" Morrison). Silva continued the Brides with backing singers Sheila Horne and Jeanette McGruder for another year.

In 1983, Mabry joined Talking Heads for their concert film Stop Making Sense. She also spent time as a background vocalist, continuing to tour with such acts as Rita Coolidge, Namie Amuro, Bette Midler and George Michael. In 1990, she toured as a backing vocalist for Fleetwood Mac during their Behind the Mask Tour. In 1991, she toured as a backing vocalist for Stevie Nicks during her Time Space tour. In the same year, she performed a cover version Soul II Soul's "Back to Life (However Do You Want Me)" with George Michael for his Cover to Cover tour.

Mabry is also a business partner with Sheila E. In 2001, the two co-founded the nonprofit Elevate Hope Foundation, which uses music and the arts to help "abused and abandoned children."

== Filmography ==
Year	Film	Role
1984	Stop Making Sense	Herself
2013	20 Feet from Stardom	Herself
2026	George Michael: The Faith Tour	Herself

== See also ==
- List of P-Funk members
- List of P-Funk projects
