= Mallia Franklin =

American vocalist

Rosalind Mallia Franklin (March 1, 1952 – February 5, 2010), also known as The Queen Of Funk, was a vocalist of the American funk band Parliament-Funkadelic. She introduced friends George Clinton and Bootsy Collins in 1971, and brought ex-Ohio Player Junie Morrison to the band in 1978.

She sang background on early Parliament and Funkadelic albums, and became an original member of Parlet, P-Funk's sub-group, where she recorded Pleasure Principle in 1978 and half of Invasion Of The Booty Snatchers in 1979. She left the group to form a proposed P-Funk offshoot, Sterling Silver Starship with bassist Donnie Sterling.

She appeared with Clinton in Prince's 1990 film Graffiti Bridge. Her first solo album Funken Tersepter was released in Japan in 1995 on P-Vine. She wrote, with Snoop Dogg, on the 2002 release Suited and Booted, and earlier appeared on his 1993 studio album, Doggystyle.

Franklin was married to drummer Nathaniel Neblett of the band New Birth. They had one child, Seth Neblett.
