= Dawn Silva =

American vocalist

- Born: Dawn Carla Weber; January 2, 1951 (age 75); Sacramento, California, U.S.
- Genres: Funk, R&B, soul
- Occupations: Vocalist, songwriter, author
- Years active: 1975–present
- Formerly of: Sly and the Family Stone; Parliament-Funkadelic; The Brides of Funkenstein; The Gap Band

Dawn Silva (born January 2, 1951) is an American funk vocalist. She is best known as a member of The Brides of Funkenstein and for her work with Sly and the Family Stone and The Gap Band.

== Life and career ==
Silva was born and raised in Sacramento, California where her musical background began as a teenager performing alongside her sister in a high school group named Windsong. In 1974, Cynthia Robinson of Sly and the Family Stone overheard the group rehearsing in the Silva family garage and invited Dawn to audition. Silva officially joined Sly Stone's band as a background vocalist in 1975.

=== Parliament-Funkadelic and The Brides of Funkenstein (1977–1981) ===
In January 1977, following the abrupt departure of Sly & The Family Stone from a joint U.S. tour, George Clinton recruited background vocalists Dawn Silva and Lynn Mabry into the Parliament-Funkadelic collective. Silva made her P-Funk recording debut in 1977, contributing backing vocals to Eddie Hazel's Game, Dames and Guitar Thangs and Parliament's Funkentelechy Vs. the Placebo System.

Recognizing the duo's commercial potential, Clinton formed a spin-off group named The Brides of Funkenstein, a concept derived from Parliament's 1976 album The Clones of Dr. Funkenstein. Signed to Atlantic Records, the duo released their debut studio album, Funk Or Walk, in September 1978. The album's lead single, "Disco To Go" (co-written and produced by Clinton and Bootsy Collins), became a commercial success, selling over 500,000 copies and receiving a RIAA Gold certification. The group subsequently won the 1979 Record World R&B Award for Best New R&B Group and Top New Female Group in 1978.

Following Mabry's departure from the P-Funk organization in 1979, Silva remained as the group's central figure. Clinton restructured the act into a trio by adding vocalists Sheila Horne and Jeanette McGruder. This lineup recorded the group's second album, Never Buy Texas From A Cowboy (1979). The title track became a prominent dance chart fixture, and the album was later recognized by Rolling Stone in 2001 as one of the "50 Coolest Albums Ever Released." Silva remained the only original member to stay with the Brides of Funkenstein through their entire active run until the P-Funk collective's financial collapse in the early 1980s.

=== Later years ===
Silva recorded and toured with The Gap Band in 1982. She signed a solo deal with Polygram Records in 1988, but her debut album was never released.

Her recording and touring credits include but are not limited to; Ice Cube, Boyz n the Hood, Roy Ayers, Snoop Dogg, Coolio, B.B. King, and Parliament-Funkadelic. In December 2000, Silva independently released her debut solo album, All My Funky Friends, distributed in Europe through Musisoft. The album became a prominent underground release, prompting Pulse! magazine to call it the "most authentic funk album to be released in over two decades."

== Book ==
In 2023, Silva published her autobiography, The Funk Queen. The memoir chronicles her early life, her involvement with the Black Panther Party, and the financial and gender dynamics of the 1970s and 1980s music industry. The book received an ARSC Award for Excellence from the Association for Recorded Sound Collections.

== Discography ==
- High On You – Sly Stone (Epic/CBS) 1975
- Heard Ya Missed Me, Well I'm Back – Sly & The Family Stone (Epic/CBS) 1976
- Parliament Live P.Funk Earth Tour – Parliament (Casablanca) 1977
- Funkentelechy vs. the Placebo Syndrome – Parliament (Casablanca) 1977
- Game, Dames and Guitar Thangs – Eddie Hazel (Warner Bros) 1977
- A Blow for Me, a Toot to You – Fred Wesley and The Horny Horns (Atlantic) 1977
- Funk or Walk – The Brides Of Funkenstein (Atlantic) 1978
- One Nation Under a Groove – Funkadelic (Warner Bros) 1978
- Motor-Booty Affair – Parliament (Casablanca) 1978
- GloryHallaStoopid – Parliament (Casablanca) 1979
- Say Blow by Blow Backwards – Fred Wesley and The Horny Horns (Atlantic) 1979
- Never Buy Texas from a Cowboy – The Brides of Funkenstein (Atlantic) 1979
- This Boot Is Made for Fonk-N – Bootsy Collins (Warner Bros) 1979
- Trombipulation – Parliament (Casablanca) 1980
- Gap Band IV – The Gap Band (Total Experience) 1982
- Gap Band V – The Gap Band (Total Experience) 1983
- Gap Band VI – The Gap Band (Total Experience) 1984
- Gap Band VII – The Gap Band (Total Experience) 1985
- All My Funky Friends – Dawn Silva (SilvaSounds/JDC Records) 2000

== See also ==
- "Parliament Funkadelic documentary screens at SF Black Film Fest this Sunday". San Francisco Bay View. June 15, 2016.
- "Sync The Funk Up: QA with Lead Bride Of Funkenstein, Dawn Silva". Sync Summit. August 3, 2015.
- "From the Archives: Interview with Bride of Funkenstein Dawn Silva". IndieDisco. December 1, 2016.
