= Parlet =

American female funk group

- Parlet in 1979

Background information
- Origin: Detroit, MI
- Genres: Funk, soul
- Years active: 1978–1980
- Label: Casablanca
- Past members: Mallia Franklin; Debbie Wright; Jeanette Washington; Shirley Hayden; Janice Evans

Parlet was a female spinoff group from P-Funk formed by veteran background vocalists Mallia Franklin, Jeanette Washington and Debbie Wright. Washington and Wright were the first female members in Parliament-Funkadelic in 1975.

== Discography ==
Studio albums	US R&B	Year
Pleasure Principle	55	1978
Invasion of the Booty Snatchers	73	1979
Play Me or Trade Me	—	1980

Singles	US R&B	Year
Pleasure Principle	66	1978
Ridin High	49	1979
Wolf Tickets	67	1980
Help From My Friends	73	1980
