= Poetry by children =

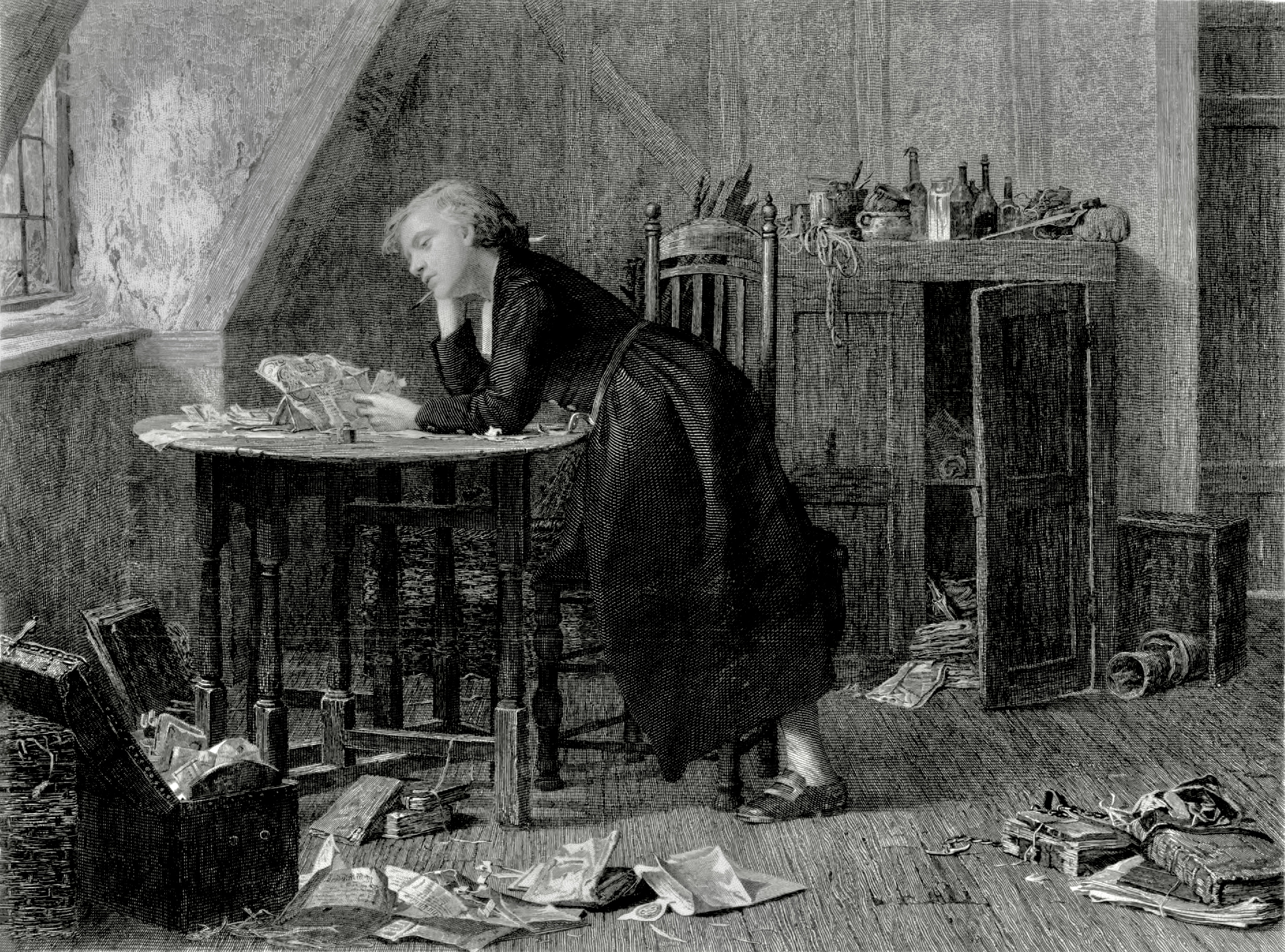
Posthumous illustration of poet Thomas Chatterton, 1872.

Poetry by children includes poems written by authors before reaching adulthood.

Notable poets, like Thomas Chatterton, Mattie J. Stepanek, and Hilda Conkling, only produced works as children or teenagers.

200 global poems by children were collected in Richard Lewis's 1966 anthology Miracles. Its poem "My Brain" was quoted by psychoanalysts and musicians for decades, including composer Gershon Kingsley, psychedelic band Perth County Conspiracy, poet Louis Dudek, and psychoanalyst Peter Levine.

== History ==
=== 18th century ===
English poet Thomas Chatterton influenced Romantic artists of the period such as Shelley, Keats, Wordsworth and Coleridge. In his teen years, he wrote political letters, eclogues, lyrics, operas and satires, both in prose and verse. His romantic works, written in the medieval style, often faced rejection during his life. After his death by suicide at age 17, his poems and talents were recognized by contemporaries, and he received a variety of eulogies and portraits for centuries onward.

=== 19th century ===
Before her 1811 death at 8 years old, Scottish writer Marjorie Fleming included poetry in her diary. Her works gained appreciation from Robert Louis Stevenson and Leslie Stephen. Her writings received renewed popularity in the Victorian period.

=== 20th century ===
First published in 1920's Poems By a Little Girl, American poet Hilda Conkling composed most of her poetry between four and fourteen years old. Her mother would transcribe them before she was able to write, then read them back to Conkling for her review and corrections. Following several publications, Conkling did not publish poetry as an adult.

In 1956, at 8 years old, Minou Drouet's poems and letters circulated privately among French writers and publishers, prompting her to publish a poetry collection titled Poèmes. She overcame skepticism about her mother's intervention in her works by writing poetry without her mother present, such as a poem to gain admission to France's Society of Authors, Composers and Music Publishers.

=== Miracles, 1966 ===
Between 1964 and 1966, Richard Lewis toured the English-speaking world to collect 3,000 poems by children under 13 years of age. 200 were published in the anthology Miracles.

One of these was "My Brain", written by Annabel Laurance, then a 10-year-old girl in Uganda. "My Brain" quoted by psychoanalysts and musicians for decades, including composer Gershon Kingsley, psychedelic band Perth County Conspiracy, poet Louis Dudek, and psychoanalyst Peter Levine.

=== 21st century ===
Before his 2003 death at the age of 13, poet Mattie Stepanek began writing at the age of 3 years old. Stepanek published seven books of poetry, several of which appeared on The New York Times Best Seller list. His 2001 anthology Heartsongs is perhaps his most notable poetry collection. In 2003, country music singer Billy Gilman released Music Through Heartsongs, the lyrics of which were Stepanek's poetry; it peaked at #15 of Billboard's Top Country Music Albums.

== See also ==
- Child art
