= First Moog Quartet (album) =

Studio album by Gershon Kingsley's First Moog Quartet
- Released: 1970
- Studio: Mediasound Studios
- Genres: Classical, experimental
- Length: 32:21
- Label: Audio Fidelity
- Producer: Gershon Kingsley

First Moog Quartet is a 1970 self-titled classical experimental album and the only album by Gershon Kingsley's First Moog Quartet.

It was released the same year the First Moog Quartet performed in Carnegie Hall.

The anti-war album involves themes of cosmogony, creation myth, divinity, war, the subtle body, introspection, universal consciousness, and reincarnation. Due to these themes, it can be considered part of the opposition to United States involvement in the Vietnam War and religious music.

== Recording ==
It was recorded at Mediasound Studios.

== Summary ==
=== "In The Beginning" ===
"In The Beginning" is an ambient electronic experimental track. Due to its title referencing the Biblical phrase of Genesis 1:1, it can be assumed that its soundscape attempts to convey the creation of the universe.

=== "Miracles" ===
"Miracles" contains multiple spoken-word poems, accompanied by experimental Moog sound effects. These are likely from the poetry anthology Miracles, a 1966 collection of poems written by children.

The lyric "I hear the drummer strike the sky" is a mantra repeated by various singers, being whispered, screamed, sobbed, cheered, moaned, and repeated in falsetto.

Following the "drummer strike the sky" meditation, the singer repeats the 1966 child's poem "My Brain" over an arpeggiated sequence:

I have a little brain tucked safely in my head;
and another little brain, which is in the air instead.
This follows me and plays with me and talks to me in bed.
The other one confuses me - the one that's in my head.

The above poetry is sung in a round by various singers until a cacophony occurs.

"My Brain" also appears in Perth County Conspiracy's 1970 song "Listen to the Kids" on their Do Not Exist album.

=== "Have It - Or Grab It - Or Go" ===
The song involves one-word versus and describes war, grief, loneliness, and a "terrible joke". Sound effects include buzzes and zaps.

It contains a soft drum roll over which a synthesizer plays a rendition of Taps.

The lyrics "you really must go...be a good little man, wave goodbye if you can...you embarrass us all, be a doll and just go" and war sound effects imply that the song focuses on the Vietnam War draft. Due to the album's proximity with New Age spirituality and spoken-word poetry, it was likely written in opposition to United States involvement in the Vietnam War.

=== "Images" ===
The song mentions the perspective of David (possibly the Biblical King David) and Madonna (possibly Mary, mother of Jesus). They sing of a utopia long ago experienced by David: "a world where only the flag in the sky is the sun", "where everyone is free" in "peace with guns on holiday". This solidifies the album's anti-war viewpoint.

=== "Sounds of Silence" ===
This begins as an a cappella vocal cover of the 1964 Simon & Garfunkel song "The Sound of Silence". The singer is later joined by drums, choir, and Moog synthesizers. The synthesizer creates a stabbing sound effect to accompany the lyric, after which the synthesizers creates a windswept ambience accompanied by arpeggiated chords.

The last verses are sung as an a cappella choir. It ends with the same singer.

=== "Eleanor Rigby" ===
A drumroll introduces the synthesizer cover of the 1966 The Beatles song "Eleanor Rigby". The chords are slightly altered, and it is mostly an instrumental track. Various sound effects and low drums create what can be described as a thunderous effect.

=== "Did You Ever Take a Journey" ===
The original song begins with the query, "Did you ever take a journey with yourself, by yourself, to yourself?" and describes the singer's enlightenment through introspection.

=== "Rebirth" ===
In "Rebirth," the singer describes that he was a star when the Earth came to life. He describes that everything in the universe is part of himself. Born and reborn in a master design," he expresses that now he is a man, but the wisdom that he gleaned from his time as a star, stone, tree, and birds assist him in his current life, for all of these lives are still part of himself. He expresses that he needs this wisdom as he tries to find his place in "the lost race of Man", but his true place is in the cosmic plan.

== Track listing ==
No.	Title	Length
1.	"In the Beginning"	3:00
2.	"Miracles"	6:30
3.	"Have It - Or Grab It - Or Go"	5:36
4.	"Images"	2:53
5.	"Sounds of Silence" (Cover of The Sound of Silence)	4:29
6.	"Eleanor Rigby" (Cover of The Beatles song Eleanor Rigby)	3:07
7.	"Did You Ever Take a Journey"	4:02
8.	"Rebirth"	2:44

== Personnel ==
- Bass – Richard Nanista
- Drums – David Brewer
- Engineer – Fred Christie
- Keyboards – Mike Alterman
- Percussion – David Friedman
- Producer, Directed By – Gershon Kingsley
- Synthesizer [Moog] – Eric W. Knight*, Howard Salat, Kenneth Bichel*, Stan Free
- Vocals – Douglas Hill, Leah Horen, Ronee Blakley, Tony Wells
