= Zimbabwean jazz =

Music genre

Zimbabwean Jazz, also known as Afro Jazz, was developed in the 20th century. Its history can be traced from its early colonial era.

It was influenced by a style of township rhythm that evolved in a southern part of Africa over the 20th century. One can also trace similarities from Kwela, a pennywhistle-based, street music from the southern part of Africa with jazzy underpinnings and a distinctive, skiffle-like beat. Kwela music was influenced by blending the music of Malawian immigrants to South Africa, together with the local South African sounds. In Chichewa, the word Kwela has a very similar meaning to the South African meaning: "to climb". The music was popularised in South Africa and then brought to Malawi, where contemporary Malawian artists have also begun producing Kwela music.

It is also closely related to Marabi which was the name given to a keyboard style (often using cheap pedal organs) that had a musical link to American jazz, ragtime and blues, with roots deep in the African tradition. Early Marabi musicians were part of an underground musical culture and were typically not recorded. An example of such an artist in the early 1940s is August Msarurgwa of the Skokiaan fame. It has continued to develop and traits of this music continued with his grandson Prince Kudakwashe Musarurwa.

This music was often played in townships (segregated parts of suburban areas). During colonial years of Rhodesia, the term township referred to a residential area reserved for black citizens within the boundaries of a city or town, and is still commonly used colloquially. But in modern Zimbabwe it is also used to refer to a residential area within close proximity of a rural growth point. These townships hosted shebeens as an alternative to pubs and bars. In the colonial era indigenous Africans were barred from entering pubs or bars reserved for those of European descent.

Originally shebeens were operated illegally by women who were called Shebeen Queens and was itself a revival of the African tradition that assigned the role of alcohol brewing to women. The Shebeen Queens would sell home brewed and home-distilled alcohol and provided patrons with a place to meet and discuss political and social issues. Often, patrons and owners were arrested by the police, though the shebeens were frequently reopened because of their importance in unifying the community and providing a safe place for discussion. During the colonial era shebeens became a crucial meeting place for activists, some attracting working class activists and community members, while others attracted lawyers, doctors and musicians.

Shebeens also provided music and dancing, allowing patrons to express themselves culturally, which helped give rise to and support for the musical genre called Township Jazz which we now call Afro Jazz or Zimbabwean Jazz.

== Notable jazz musicians ==
- Charles Fernando
- Victor Kunonga
- Dorothy Masuka
- Oliver Mtukudzi
- August Musarurwa
- Prince Kudakwashe Musarurwa
- Percy Nehoreka Nhara
- Josh Meck
- Takakunda Mukundu
