= Hot Butter =

American instrumental pop band (1971–1978)

- Origin: New York City, U.S.
- Genres: Electronic, pop, synth-pop
- Years active: 1971–1978
- Labels: Musicor; Dynamo
- Past members: Stan Free; John Abbott; Bill Jerome; Steve Jerome; Danny Jordan; Dave Mullaney

Hot Butter was an American instrumental band fronted by the keyboard player and studio musician Stan Free. The other band members were John Abbott (arranger, guitar), brothers Bill (producer, engineer, percussion) and Steve Jerome (producer, electric piano), Danny Jordan (producer) and Dave Mullaney (arranger, ondioline); also joined in studio by Tony Spinosa (percussion). They were best known for their 1972 version of the Moog synthesizer instrumental song "Popcorn", originally recorded by its composer, Gershon Kingsley, in 1969. The track became an international hit, selling a million copies in France, 250,000 in the United Kingdom, and over two million worldwide.

== History ==
The group released two albums, Hot Butter (Musicor MS-3242; 1972) and More Hot Butter (Musicor MS-3254; 1973), primarily of covers, on LP issued by Hallmark Records. (The 1974 Australian Moog Hits consisted of nine tracks from More Hot Butter, plus two new tracks, Roger Whittaker's "Russian Whistler" and "Mexican Whistler".) The two albums were compiled on CD as Popcorn on the Castle Music label in 2000, omitting "Pipeline" and "Kappa Maki" from More Hot Butter and the two new tracks from Moog Hits.

Tracks written by members of the band were "At the Movies" (the B-side of "Popcorn") and "Tristana", by all the band members except Free, and "Space Walk", by Jan Fairchild (Mullaney) and his father Dave Mullaney. "The Silent Screen (Hot Butter)" is credited to all the members except for Free, but it's actually an arrangement of the main theme of the first movement of Wolfgang Amadeus Mozart's Symphony No. 40. Among the other artists covered by the band were Stephen Schwartz, Jerry Lordan and The Shadows, Neil Diamond, Joe Meek and The Tornados, Neal Hefti, Serge Gainsbourg, Robert Maxwell, Piero Umiliani, Jean-Joseph Mouret, Billy Joe & the Checkmates, Joe Buffalo's Band, Teo Macero, Leroy Anderson, Chuck Rio, and Norman Petty and The String-A-Longs. Mullaney and Abbott did most of the arranging. The Jeromes, Jordan, and Richard E. Talmadge produced the albums with MTL Productions for Musicor.

In addition to "Popcorn", another well-known track is August Msarurgwa's "Skokiaan", which was included on RE/Search's compilation album Incredibly Strange Music. Follow-up singles included The Shadows' "Apache", Chuck Rio's (Danny Flores) "Tequila", Billy Joe and the Checkmates' "Percolator", Joe Buffalo's Band's "Slag Solution", and Gene Farrow with G.F. Band's "You Should Be Dancing".

== Members ==
=== Stan Free ===
Stan Free
- Born: Stanley Friedland; April 12, 1922; Brooklyn, New York, U.S.
- Died: August 17, 1995 (aged 73) New York, U.S.
- Genre: Jazz

Stan Free (born Stanley Friedland) (April 12, 1922 – August 17, 1995) was an American jazz musician (pianist), composer, conductor and arranger. Free was born in New York City's Brooklyn borough in 1922, and received a classical musical education, studying with Alexander Siloti and also at the Juilliard School. While still in his teens, he organized a combo (Stanley Friedland's Royal New Yorkers) that played in the Catskills. He also served as a staff sergeant in the Seventh Cavalry in World War II, seeing combat in the Pacific.

Upon his return, he became active in many musical endeavors, including serving as musical director for one of the first live television variety talk shows, "Cafe De Paris" with Sylvie St. Clair, on WABD, the old DuMont channel in New York (1949). The Stan Free Trio played in many New York jazz clubs of the day, including The Composer, The Embers, The Living Room and Hickory House to name a few. He was the featured performer for several summers at Herb McCarthy's Bowden Square in Southampton, Long Island. He recorded several albums (now out of print) under his own name: Free For All: The Stan Free Trio, Piano A La Percussion and Stan Free Five: Would You Believe? Jazz Alive.

Free's best-known recording was the Moog hit "Popcorn" (1972), with the album named Hot Butter. In addition to Free, five studio musicians contributed to the album. Free also toured and recorded with the First Moog Quartet (1970–72), organized by Gershon Kingsley. Additionally he arranged music and conducted for many performers, notably the jazz vocalist Chris Connor (Chris Craft), and the comedian Jack Carter. He was also a studio musician for many of the rock and pop groups of the 1960s, including The Four Seasons, The Monkees and The Association. In 1979, Free played percussion on the Broadway Show The Most Happy Fella.

He was married with children and grandchildren, and died in New York.

== Discography ==
=== Albums ===
==== Hot Butter ====
- Musicor MS-3242 (U.S.); Pye International NSPL.28169 (UK), 1972

Side one

1. "Popcorn" (Gershon Kingsley) (2:30)
2. "Day by Day" (Stephen Schwartz) (3:44)
3. "Apache" (Jerry Lordan) (2:50)
4. "At the Movies" (Abbott, Mullaney, Jerome, Jerome, Jordan) (2:31)
5. "Tristana" (Abbott, Mullaney, Jerome, Jerome, Jordan) (3:29)
6. "Song Sung Blue" (Neil Diamond) (3:54)

Side two

1. "Telstar" (Joe Meek) (2:34)
2. "Tomatoes" (Neal Hefti) (2:27)
3. "Amazing Grace" (Trad. Arr. Abbott, Mullaney) (2:37)
4. "Love at First Sight" (S. Gainsbourg) (2:38)
5. "Song of the Nairobi Trio" (R. Maxwell) (2:13)
6. "Hot Butter (The Silent Screen)" (Abbott, Mullaney, Jerome, Jerome, Jordan) (2:04)

==== More Hot Butter ====
- Musicor MS-3254; 1973

Side one

1. "Percolator"
2. "Slag Solution"
3. "Sounds"
4. "Wheels"
5. "Skokiaan"
6. "Pipeline"

Side two

1. "Space Walk"
2. "The Masterpiece"
3. "Tequila" (Instrumental)
4. "Syncopated Clock"
5. "Kappa Maki"
6. "Mah-Na, Mah-Na"

==== Popcorn with Hot Butter ====
Side one

1. "Popcorn" (Instrumental)
2. "Day by Day"
3. "Apache"
4. "At the Movies"
5. "Tomatoes"

Side two

1. "Pipeline"
2. "Hot Butter"
3. "Telstar"
4. "Tristana"
5. "Song of the Nairobi Trio"
6. "Amazing Grace"

==== Moog Hits ====
- Musicor Records, L34984, 1974 (Australia)

Side one

1. "Slag Solution"
2. "Sounds - Simple"
3. "Wheels"
4. "Skokiaan"
5. "Russian Whistler"

Side two

1. "Space Walk"
2. "The Masterpiece"
3. "Tequila"
4. "Syncopated Clock"
5. "Mah-Na, Mah-Na"
6. "Mexican Whistler"

==== Popcorn (CD) ====
- Castle Music ESMCD907 (UK), 2000
1. "Popcorn" (Gershon Kingsley)
2. "Day by Day" (Stephen Schwartz)
3. "Apache" (Lordan)
4. "At the Movies" (Abbott, Mullaney, Jerome, Jerome, Jordan)
5. "Tristana" (Abbott, Mullaney, Jerome, Jerome, Jordan)
6. "Song Sung Blue" (Diamond)
7. "Telstar" (Meek)
8. "Tomatoes" (Hefti)
9. "Amazing Grace" (Trad. Arr. Abbott, Mullaney)
10. "Love at First Sight" (Gainsbourg)
11. "Song of the Narobi Trio" (Maxwell).
12. "Hot Butter (The Silent Screen)" (Abbott, Mullaney, Jerome, Jerome, Jordan)
13. "Mah-Na-Mah-Na" (Umiliani)
14. "Masterpiece" (Mouret, Parnes)
15. "Percolator" (Bideu, Freeman)
16. "Skokiaan" (Kusarurgwa)
17. "Slag Solution" (Morgan, Ranzzano)
18. "Sounds" (Macero)
19. "Space Walk" (Mullaney, Mullaney)
20. "Syncopated Clock" (Anderson, Parish)
21. "Tequila" (Rio)
22. "Wheels" (Petty)

=== Singles ===
- 1972: "Popcorn" (Gershon Kingsley) [2:30] / "At the Movies" (John Abbott, Dave Mullaney, Bill Jerome, Steve Jerome, Danny Jordan) [2:31]
- 1972: "Apache" (Jerry Lordan) [2:47] / "Hot Butter" (Mozart: Sinfonie Nr. 40) (Abbott, Mullaney, B. Jerome, S. Jerome, Jordan) [2:08]
- 1972: "Tequila" (Chuck Rio) [1:47] / "Tomatoes" (Neil Hefti) [2:21]
- 1973: "Percolator" (Lew Bedell, Ernie Freeman) [1:58] / "Tristana" (Abbott, Mullaney, B. Jerome, S. Jerome, Jordan) [3:29] (#46 CAN AC)
- 1973: "Slag Solution" (Tony Ranzzano, Babel Son) [2:30] / "Kappa Maki" (Abbott, Mullaney, B. Jerome, S. Jerome, Jordan) [2:38]
- 1975: "Getting Off" (D. Mullaney, J. Mullaney) [2:53] / "Getting On" (D. Mullaney, J. Mullaney) [3:29]
- 1977: "You Should Be Dancing" (Gene Farrow, Chris Warren) [5:13] / "You Should Be Dancing" (Track Without Lead Vocal) (Farrow, Warren) [4:42]
