= My Brain =

Poem by Annabel Laurance

"My Brain" is a c. 1964 – c. 1966 poem written by Annabel Laurance, then a 10-year-old girl in Uganda.

After its 1966 quotation in The New York Times, "My Brain" has been quoted by musicians, poets, and psychoanalysts for over 50 years. These include composer Gershon Kingsley, band Perth County Conspiracy, Louis Dudek, and psychoanalyst Peter Levine.

== Background ==
"My Brain" was among 3,000 poems collected by Richard Lewis on a "world tour" of children poets of the English-speaking world. "My Brain" was first published in 1966's Miracles, a global anthology of 200 poems by children.

== Text ==
An excerpt from the 1970 First Moog Quartet song "Miracles" recites the poem as follows:

I have a little brain tucked safely in my head;
and another little brain, which is in the air instead.
This follows me and plays with me and talks to me in bed.
The other one confuses me - the one that's in my head.

== Legacy ==
=== 20th century ===
In 1967, it was included in Volume 20 of Manas. That year, it was also featured in the December 1967 Horn Book Magazine; this clipping was collected and digitized by the United States Department of Education.

In 1970, the song was prominently featured in Gershon Kingsley's transcendental spiritual album, First Moog Quartet. It is featured in the song "Miracles" which likely contained other poetry from the Miracles book of poetry by children. Multiple singers perform the poem "My Brain" as a musical round.

The same year, the poem was read by an adult man in Perth County Conspiracy's 1970 song "Listen to the Kids" on their Do Not Exist album.

The poetry was reprinted in 1975 in Readings in Human Growth and Development.

Canadian poet Louis Dudek included the poem in his 1973 book All Kinds of Everything and his 1988 essay collection, In Defence of Art: Critical Essays & Reviews.

It was quoted by British physicist Stephen Blundell in his 1998 book Making the Invisible Visible.

In 1998, composer Ron Jeffers arranged the poetry for choir on sheet music, as part of Three Children's Songs.

=== 21st century ===
In 2020, American psychotherapist Peter Levine described the poem as "somatic experiencing".

The poem was recited in 2023 podcast Word Magic.
