= Prince Kudakwashe Musarurwa =

Zimbabwean singer (1988–2020)

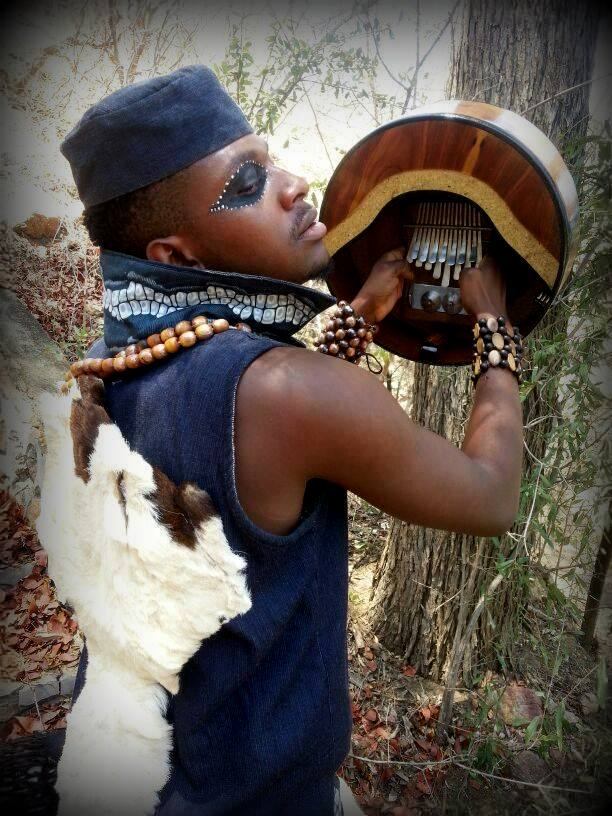
Prince.

Prince Kudakwashe Musarurwa (December 5, 1988 – February 15, 2020), was a Zimbabwean African jazz (Afro Jazz) singer, songwriter, producer and musician.

== Biography ==
Musarurwa was born and raised in Zimbabwe, his career began within the family, starting with August Musarurwa, composer of the song Skokiaan. He sang in his school choir, spending much of his time playing his father's acoustic guitar. While growing up his musical influences included Oliver Mtukudzi, Salif Keita and Hugh Masekela. After finishing high school he went to the Zimbabwe College of Music.

After this, he recorded his first album called Kurarama in 2011, followed by another album Garamuberevere in 2012. In 2013 a collaboration followed with his niece Pamhidzai Tracy Mbirimi (Pah Chihera) on a song called Runonzi Rudo which Musarurwa wrote, as well as all the songs on Tracy's debut album. In the same year of 2013, Musarurwa also released an album entitled Gogodera. 2014 saw him début at the Hifa (Harare International Festival of the Arts), as well a tour to Uganda in the summer of that year performing at the famous Gatto Matto restaurant in Kampala. In 2015 he released his fourth album Chiga Chikuru and also he had his début tour of the United Kingdom performing at T Chances Music Centre London and the Drum in Birmingham. Then in 2016, "Prince" had a début tour of the United States, performing at the Shrine World Music Venue & Madiba Restaurant and Silvana in New York, where he shared the stage with Leopoldo F. Fleming, a musician, composer, lyricist, and arranger, who has played, recorded, toured with a cornucopia of other great artists such as Nina Simone, Miriam Makeba, Angélique Kidjo, Simone Kelly, Harry Belafonte and many more. "Prince" won an award for best undiscovered talent at the annually held AEA – USA awards held in New Jersey.

His instruments included acoustic guitar, hosho, and mbira.

Musarurwa died from lung cancer at Chinhoyi Provincial Hospital on February 15, 2020. He was 31 years old.

== Discography ==
Kurarame (2011-2012)
No.	Title	Length
1.	"Chihera"
2.	"Hamungandisarudzire"
3.	"Makorokoto"
4.	"Waenda"
5.	"Harumbomanikidzwe"
6.	"Jubhi"

Garamuberevere (2012-2013)
No.	Title	Length
1.	"Garamuberevere"
2.	"Mamoyo"
3.	"Amai Ndinotenda"
4.	"Mumhanzi Mnandi"
5.	"Zvauya Sei"
6.	"Amai Mwana"
7.	"Mwanasikana"
8.	"Tonde (dedication song to Tonde Mawoko)"

Gogodera (2013-2014)
No.	Title	Length
1.	"Garimoto"
2.	"Ndiani Jongwe (Gogodera)"
3.	"Tamba Irikurira"
4.	"Dzorai Moyo"
5.	"Magumbo"
6.	"Nhamo"
7.	"Muchaneta"
8.	"Wanga Wakarara"

Singles (2014 – 2015)
No.	Title	Length
1.	"Tikure Murudo featuring Diana Samkange (Zimbabwe)"
2.	"I Friday Mudiwa Wangu featuring Naledi Kaisara / Slizzer (Botswana)"
3.	"I Must Stick With You featuring Daisy Ejang (Uganda)"

Chiga Chikuru (2015-2020)
No.	Title	Length
1.	"Chiga Chikuru"
2.	"Musha Waparara"
3.	"I Regret"
4.	"Haruperi Zvekumhanya"
5.	"Mumhanzi Mnandi"
6.	"Murume Wangu"
7.	"Kuenda Mbire"
8.	"Mamoyo"
9.	"I Do Love You"
10.	"I Must stick with You ft Daisy Hope Ejang"
11.	"Pfekai Kasuit Kaye ft Sulumani Chimbetu"
