= Miracles (anthology) =

1966 poetry anthology

Miracles: Poems by Children of the English-speaking World is a 1966 poetry anthology edited by Richard Lewis.

== Composition and publication ==
In 1961, Lewis began teaching elementary school creative writing classes, and became interested in children's poetry. From 1964 to 1966, he traveled on a "world tour" of the English-speaking world and collected over three thousand poems by children. The anthology contains two hundred of these, and was published by Simon & Schuster in 1966. It includes poetry from the United States, New Zealand, Kenya, Uganda, Canada, England, Australia, India, and the Philippines.

The book was discussed in the December 1967 Horn Book Magazine, alongside two poems reprinted with permission by Simon & Schuster.

== Legacy ==
The 1970 experimental song "Miracles" in transcendental album First Moog Quartet likely honors the book; it contains multiple instances of spoken-word poetry. The song includes a musical round of "My Brain".

The Annabel Laurance poem "My Brain" has been discussed and quoted by musicians, poets, and psychologists for over 50 years. These include composer Gershon Kingsley, psychedelic band Perth County Conspiracy, poet Louis Dudek, and pscyhoanalyst Peter Levine.
