= Sweetnighter =

Studio album by Weather Report
- Released: April 27, 1973
- Recorded: February 3–7, 1973
- Studios: Connecticut Recording Studio, Bridgeport, Connecticut
- Genre: Jazz fusion
- Length: 44:41
- Label: Columbia
- Producer: Shoviza Productions

Weather Report chronology
I Sing the Body Electric (1972)	Sweetnighter (1973)	Mysterious Traveller (1974)

Professional ratings
Review scores
Source	Rating
AllMusic	4/5 stars
Christgau's Record Guide	B
The Penguin Guide to Jazz Recordings	3.5/4 stars
Rolling Stone	(not rated)
The Rolling Stone Jazz Record Guide	3/5 stars
Sputnikmusic	4.5/5

Sweetnighter is the third studio album by American jazz fusion band Weather Report, released by Columbia Records in 1973.

== Writing and recording ==
The group had recorded the songs in a five-day stretch during February of the same year. It was to be the last album to feature founding member Miroslav Vitouš as the primary bassist.

Zawinul began to assert greater control of the band, steering it away from the collective improvisation that marked its live performances toward more structured compositions emphasizing funk and groove. This was exemplified by the album's two dominant tracks, "Boogie Woogie Waltz" and "125th Street Congress," as well as the closer, "Non-Stop Home." Other tracks were reminiscent of Weather Report's previous albums. Sweetnighter is considered to be the most stylistically transitional release by the band as it bridged the gap between the more open, improvisational earlier style to a more compositionally structured format. Also, the more prominent use of electric bass is evident here. Zawinul had taken the decision to add some funky beats in the band's sounds, so he recruited drummer Herschel Dwellingham and percussionist Muruga Booker to play on the album. Andrew White was hired to play the English horn, but also handled the bass for three tracks.

Sweetnighter was recorded at a Connecticut recording studio in less than a week, and was released in April 1973.

== Critical reception ==
Reviewing in Christgau's Record Guide: Rock Albums of the Seventies (1981), Robert Christgau wrote: "Ask yourself: What kind of a jazz (or rock) (or jazz-rock) group would conceive its sonar identity around electric keyboards and soprano sax? A pretty dinky (not dunky) one, right? So while I'm pleased that they're going for a drum groove a little solider than anything Dom Um Romao can move and shake, I'm not surprised that they get it only—just barely, in fact—on '125th Street congress.' And that 'Boogie Woogie Waltz' is fatally cute, ace improvisations and all."

== Legacy ==
"Boogie Woogie Waltz" was frequently in the band's live sets through the 1970s, and a live version from 1978 appeared on the album 8:30. Also in 1978, Vitouš recorded a new version of "Will" with Terje Rypdal and Jack DeJohnette on their collective album for ECM.

== Track listing ==
Side one

1. "Boogie Woogie Waltz" (Josef Zawinul) – 13:06
2. "Manolete" (Wayne Shorter) – 5:58
3. "Adios" (Zawinul) – 3:02

Side two

1. "125th Street Congress" (Zawinul) – 12:16
2. "Will" (Miroslav Vitouš) – 6:22
3. "Non-Stop Home" (Shorter) – 3:53

== Personnel ==
Weather Report

- Joe Zawinul – piano (tracks 2 & 6), electric piano (1–5), synthesizer (1–2, 6)
- Wayne Shorter – saxophones
- Miroslav Vitouš – acoustic bass (1, 2), electric bass (3, 5)
- Andrew White – electric bass (1, 2, 4, 6), English horn (3, 5)
- Herschel Dwellingham – drums (1–2, 4, 6)
- Eric Gravatt – drums (2 & 4)
- Muruga Booker – Moroccan clay drums (1–2), roller toy (3), Israeli jar drums (4)
- Dom Um Romão – percussion, wooden flute

Production

- Shoviza Productions – producer
- Phil Giambalvo – engineer
- John Berg – cover design
- Dick Hess – cover art
