= Steve Booker =

Steve Booker may refer to:

- Steve Booker (producer), British producer and songwriter
- Muruga Booker (born 1942), American drummer
