= Minou Drouet =

French poet, musician and actress

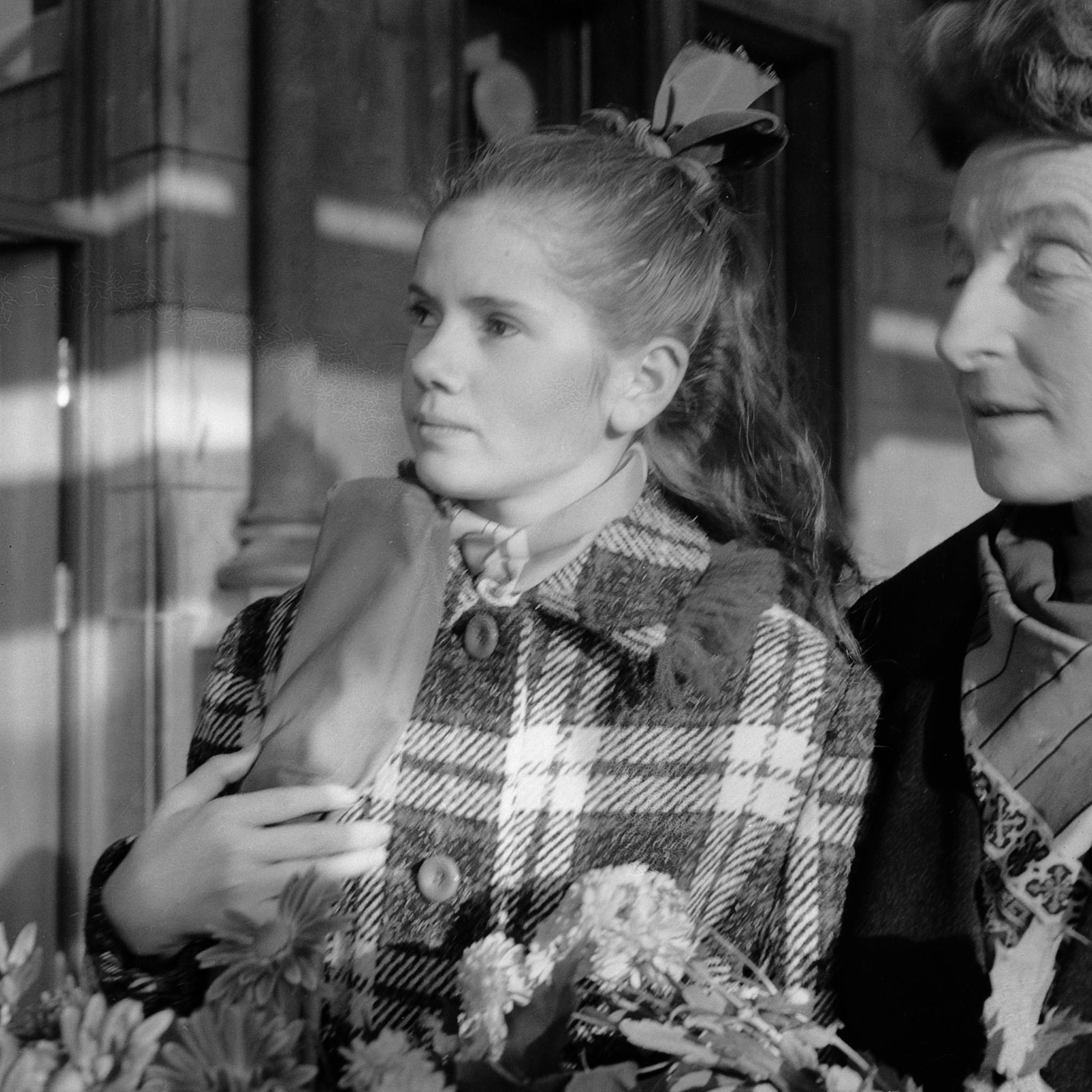
- Minou Drouet and her mother (1960)
- Born: Marie-Noëlle Drouet
- Occupations: Poet; musician; actress
- Writing career
- Language: French
- Genre: poetry

Marie-Noëlle Drouet, known as Minou Drouet (born 24 July 1947), of La Guerche-de-Bretagne, France, is a former poet, musician, and actor.

== Biography ==
Drouet gained fame in 1955 when some of her poems and letters circulated privately among French writers and publishers, generating controversy over whether or not Drouet's mother Claude was their true author. Drouet soon overcame much of this skepticism by writing poems before witnesses without her mother present. In one such test, she wrote a poem to gain admission to France's Society of Authors, Composers and Music Publishers. Drouet also studied piano and guitar. Throughout the late 1950s and early 1960s, Drouet toured as an author and musician. Jean Cocteau said famously of Drouet, "Tous les enfants ont du génie sauf Minou Drouet" (In English: "All children are geniuses, except Minou Drouet"). Michel Attenoux named his "Minou Drouet Stomp", featuring Sidney Bechet, after her.

After her grandmother became ill around 1966, Drouet worked as a nurse for two years before returning to public life as a singer-songwriter and children's novelist. She wrote one adult novel; its title in English translation was Donatella.

Eventually, Drouet returned to her childhood home in La Guerche-de-Bretagne. She now lives with her husband Jean-Paul Le Canu and has left public life except to publish a memoir, Ma vérité, in 1993. New Yorker critic Robert Gottlieb describes Ma vérité as "reticent and skimpy," saying that it focuses on facts rather than subjective interpretations of Drouet's childhood.

== Bibliography ==
=== Works in English ===
- Arbre, mon ami, translator Christine Tacq. Thame [England] : 1998. OCLC 62736195
- Then there was fire translator Margaret Crosland, London : Hamish Hamilton, 1957. OCLC 10115928

=== Books by Minou Drouet ===
- Poèmes., Genève, R. Kister, 1956. OCLC 8563893
- Arbre, mon ami (1957)
- Le Pêcheur de lune (1959)
- Du brouillard dans les yeux (1966)
- La Patte bleue (1966)
- Ouf de la forêt (1968) OCLC 61059423
- La Flamme rousse (1968, illustrated by Daniel Billon)
- Ma vérité (1993)
- Then there was fire (1957), translated by Margaret Crosland

=== Texts about Minou Drouet ===
- L'Affaire Minou Drouet (André Parinaud, 1956) OCLC 463597864
- Roland Barthes, « La littérature selon Minou Drouet », article published at Les Lettres nouvelles and retaken in the book Mythologies, 1957.

== See also ==
- Poetry by children
