= Ted Lucas (musician) =

American musician (1939–1992)

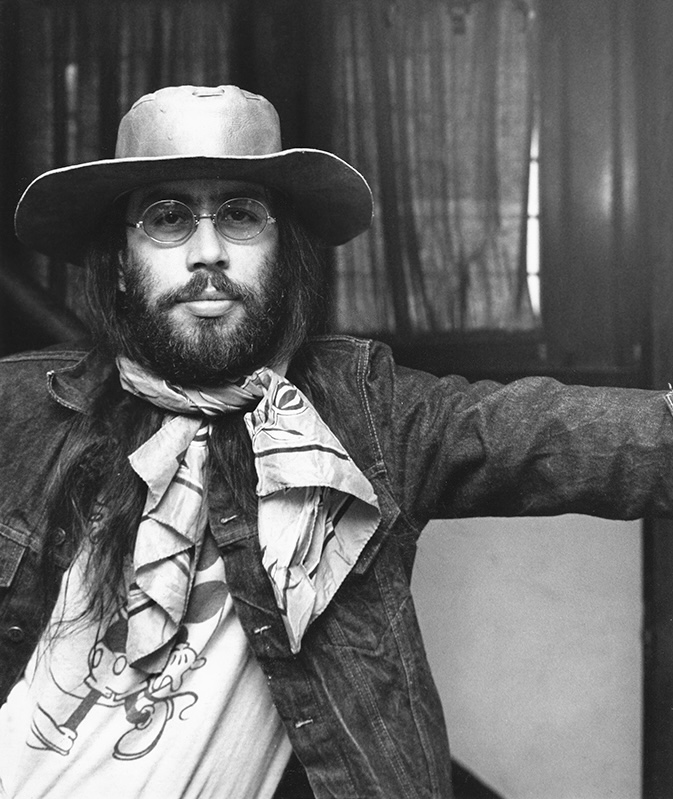
- Lucas on tour, c. 1970

Background information
- Born: Theodore Lucas; August 11, 1939; Detroit, Michigan
- Died: September 19, 1992 (aged 53) Detroit, Michigan
- Genres: Rock; folk; psychedelic folk; blues
- Occupations: Singer-songwriter; musician
- Instruments: Vocals; guitar; sitar; guitar zither; harmonica; autoharp
- Years active: 1960s–1992
- Labels: OM; Yoga Records; Third Man Records
- Formerly of: The Spike Drivers; The Misty Wizards; The Horny Toads; Ted Lucas & The Phasers; The Androids; Boogie Disease
- Website: tedlucas.net

Ted Lucas (August 11, 1939 – September 19, 1992) was an American singer, songwriter, and multi-instrumentalist based in Detroit, Michigan. Though largely obscure during his lifetime, Lucas has gained posthumous recognition for his self-titled 1975 album, which is considered a notable work of psychedelic and private-press folk.

== Early life and career ==
Lucas was born in Detroit, Michigan in 1939. His parents were Greek immigrants, and Lucas was raised Greek Orthodox. During the early 1960s, he became involved in the city's folk music scene, developing a reputation as a skilled guitarist and performer. Exposure to Balkan and other non-Western musical traditions informed his later work.

Lucas began his professional career in the 1960s Detroit music scene. He was a founding member of the psychedelic rock group The Spike Drivers, which gained local popularity and released several singles on Reprise Records between 1966 and 1967, but failed to achieve commercial success and was dropped by the label. The band was known for their sophisticated arrangements and Lucas's distinct guitar work.

Following the group's dissolution, Lucas performed sporadically with Richard Keelan in the folk duo Misty Wizard. During this period, he also established a new rock ensemble known as the Horny Toads. He later expanded his musical approach, traveling to Los Angeles where he studied sitar under Ravi Shankar and Harihar Rao. He incorporated elements of Indian classical music into his guitar playing, contributing to a distinctive hybrid style.

Lucas also worked as a session musician in Detroit, including performing sitar on recordings for Motown artists such as the Temptations, the Supremes, and Marvin Gaye.

== Solo work ==
In 1971, Lucas was invited by Warner Bros. Records to submit a solo demo. He recorded a collection of songs that would later form the basis of his only album. The label ultimately declined to release the material.

During the early 1970s, Lucas continued to pursue recording and production work, including producing an album for musician Jonathon Round that was never released following a dispute with the record label.

In 1975, Lucas independently released his self-titled album, Ted Lucas, on his own OM Records label. The album combined earlier demo recordings with additional instrumental guitar compositions, showcasing both his songwriting and instrumental abilities. The release was marked by production delays and inconsistencies across multiple pressings, as well as limited distribution. As a result, the album received little attention at the time and remained largely confined to the Detroit area.

== Style and influence ==
Lucas was noted for his technical proficiency and ability to bridge Western folk-blues traditions with elements of Eastern classical music. His guitar work incorporated finger-style techniques alongside raga-inspired structures developed through his study of the sitar.

His vocal style has been compared to the understated delivery associated with singer-songwriters such as Nick Drake, while his recordings are often characterized by sparse arrangements and introspective songwriting.

== Later life and death ==
By the late 1970s, Lucas's career had declined, and he increasingly performed in local bands that focused on cover material. His original compositions became less prominent, and he gradually withdrew from public performance.

In the early 1980s, following the end of his marriage and ongoing health and financial difficulties, Lucas moved back into his parents' house. He died on September 19, 1992, at the age of 53. The cause of death was sepsis resulting from complications following stomach surgery.

== Legacy ==
Lucas was a cult artist for many years, but despite his obscurity, he became influential on later singer-songwriters such as Clairo and Devendra Banhart.

Lucas's popularity saw a significant resurgence in the 21st century after being championed by labels such as Yoga Records and Third Man Records, which reissued his work for a global audience. Ted Lucas is frequently cited as a masterpiece of "private press" folk, and original pressings of the album are now highly sought-after collector's items. The album was reissued in reissued 2010 and 2018 on Yoga Records, and again in an extended version by Third Man Records in 2025.

On March 31, 2026, Third Man Records announced Images of Life, a three-LP retrospective box set. The set spans Lucas's career and includes material from his early bands in the 1960s, solo acoustic recordings from the early 1970s, and previously unreleased material from 1979 produced with Don Was, originally planned for his unfinished second album. The label also made the second disc, Rainy Days (1970–1974), available digitally in advance of the full release. The compilation draws on studio recordings, live performances, and home recordings from across Lucas's career. The box set was engineered and mastered by His Name is Alive's Warren Defever.

Both the Ted Lucas reissue and the Images of Life box set received critical praise. Both were named Best New Reissue by music website Pitchfork, respectively in 2025 and 2026. Pitchfork's Grayson Haver Currin called Ted Lucas "an immediately accessible but deeply uncanny record of stoner hymns, existential lullabies, and white-hot acoustic guitar playing," and noted that that the box set's length and historical span showed that Lucas was a master of many different musical styles, including psychedelia, mainstream rock, and folk. Detroit Free Press music critic Brian McCollum called Lucas' music "revelatory" and called the box set "a showcase of masterful guitar work, dexterity across musical modes, a keen melodic and lyrical sense, and an almost perfectionist-level work ethic that took him in ambitious new directions." Mariam Abdel-Razek of Paste Magazine called Images of Life "a fitting testimonial to (Lucas') sprawling genius." A.D. Amorosi of JazzTimes called the set a "mini-epic" that showcased Lucas as "a beatnik sitarist and an astonishingly adroit guitarist with a mastery of tone and mystery’s ambience."

== Discography ==
Ted Lucas
Review scores
Source	Rating
AllMusic	4.5/5 stars
Pitchfork	8.7/10 stars

Images of Life
Review scores
Source	Rating
AllMusic	4.5/5 stars
Pitchfork	8.5/10 stars

=== With The Spike Drivers ===
- "Baby Won't You Let Me Tell You How I Lost My Mind" / "High Time" (Reprise Records, 1966)
- "High Time" / "Often I Wonder" (OM Records, 1966)
- "Break Out The Wine / Strange Mysterious Sounds" (Reprise Records, 1967)

=== With The Misty Wizards ===
- "It's Love" / "Blue Law Sunday" (Reprise Records, 1967)

=== With The Horny Toads ===
- "Head In California" / "My Dog" (Single, 1970)

=== Solo ===
- Ted Lucas a.k.a. Om (1975, OM Records; reissued 2010 and 2018, Yoga Records)
- Ted Lucas: Extended (2025, Third Man Records)
- Images of Life (2026, Third Man Records)
