= Joan Dolores Wilson =

American musician

Joan Dolores Wilson (born May 28, 1933) is an American composer and harpist. She studied music at the California State University, Chico and with Janet Leigh-Taylor, Dorothy Ramsen, Robert Maxwell, Ann Stephens, Beverly Bellows, and Julie Gustavson.

Wilson has played harp with several orchestras and on radio and television. Her compositions include:

== Chamber ==
- Harper's Tunes for Troubadors (harp)
- Paradise in Blue (piano)

== Vocal ==
- Le Jardin de Versailles
- Wind Song
