= The Nairobi Trio =

- Portrayed by: Ernie Kovacs; Edie Adams; Jack Lemmon; Frank Sinatra; Bobby Lauher; Barbara Loden

The Nairobi Trio was a sketch comedy skit that Ernie Kovacs performed many times for his TV shows. It combined several existing concepts and visuals in a novel and creative way.

People in gorilla suits had long been a comedy staple. The ploy of well-known, predictable music pieces gone awry had been practiced by artists as diverse as Stan Freberg, Spike Jones, and P. D. Q. Bach. The "slow burn" of one character being annoyed by another, resulting in eventual retaliation, was not new. But the combination of all of those ingredients, combined with impeccable timing, produced a unique and memorable result.

== Origins ==
The skit was a live-action version of a child's animatronic wind-up music box, performed to the tune "Solfeggio" by Robert Maxwell. According to an interview with Edie Adams in John Barbour's 1982 documentary Ernie Kovacs: Television's Original Genius, Barry Shear, Kovacs's director at DuMont Television Network, brought the tune to Kovacs's attention in 1954.

== The theme song ==
Harpist and songwriter Robert Maxwell had recorded "Solfeggio" himself in 1953. The lyrics, sung by The Ray Charles Singers, were simply the notes of the musical scale as the melody progressed ("Mi-sol-la, re-fa-re-sol..."). When Ernie Kovacs heard the Maxwell record, he immediately came up with a mental image of what would become The Nairobi Trio:

"Solfeggio" became the permanent theme song for the sketch. The Nairobi Trio became so popular that M-G-M Records reissued the Maxwell record of "Solfeggio" as "Song of the Nairobi Trio" in 1957. Composer Maxwell recorded a new, lyrics-free version of the melody, now known as "Song of the Nairobi Trio," in 1961, billing his ensemble as "The Fortune Tellers." In 1966, as "Robert Maxwell, His Harp and Orchestra," he recorded yet a third arrangement of the melody.

== Cast members and skit scenarios ==
The original Nairobi Trio masks, wigs and hats are on display at the Museum of Broadcast Communications in Chicago.

Of the three gorillas shown, all wearing hats, long coats, and white gloves, the middle gorilla, always played by Kovacs with a cigar, conducted the musicians with either a baton or a banana. To the viewer's left stood a gorilla holding two oversized timpani mallets. The identity of this ape varied, but among Kovacs's celebrity friends both Jack Lemmon and Frank Sinatra are known to have performed the character. Seated at a piano at screen right was a female simian, variously played by Barbara Loden, Jolene Brand, and Kovacs's wife, Edie Adams, who robotically thumped her hands up and down on the keys.

Nearly all of the Nairobi Trio skits operated in the same fashion. As "Solfeggio" plays, the gorilla with the mallets repeatedly uses the center gorilla's (Kovacs's) head like a drum at the end of every phrase, punctuating the song's sharp "ba-da-BUM" bongo riff. Every time this happens it brings a slightly changed and escalating response from the victim, who eventually tries to anticipate the mallet assaults and outwit the perpetrator. Ultimately staring him down, Kovacs, in the gorilla suit, is eventually distracted by the third gorilla, which allows the drummer to give him three final blows. The victimized gorilla then stands up and smashes a prop vase over the percussionist's head. The sketch was repeated many times over the course of Kovacs's career. The audio was always "Solfeggio" but the staging changed occasionally; one variation had the first and second gorillas handling building blocks in tempo, with the third gorilla pounding at a xylophone.

Edie Adams later said that the skits were simple enough for any one of Kovacs's friends and associates to step into the drummer's role without needing a rehearsal, and that the gorilla masks provided anonymity.

The last time the routine was performed was on one of Kovacs's 1960s ABC specials shortly before his untimely death. On this occasion the combination of a bigger budget, the use of videotape, and the luxury of retakes helped him to perfect the timing of the sketch. But the Nairobi Trio wasn't always confined to silence with "Solfeggio" playing; they went into outer space and also became safe crackers on a US Steel special, Private Eye, Private Eye, which aired on CBS on March 8, 1961.

== In popular culture ==
- A popular New Zealand jazz group adopted the name, as did a radio-played Los Angeles jazz group.
- The music video for the Harry Nilsson song "Coconut" features a similar arrangement as the trio. The instrumental cover band Hot Butter includes a Moog synthesizer version of "Solfeggio" in its 1972 album Popcorn (Musicor MS-3242; 1972). On the album, the song is retitled "Song of the Narobi Trio" with Nairobi having the variant spelling of Narobi.
- Jim Knipfel entitled the second volume of his memoirs Quitting The Nairobi Trio, recounting his time in a mental institution.
- From the early 60s to the late 70s, commercials for Colt 45 Malt Liquor used music resembling "Solfeggio" as Billy Van patiently sat at a small table waiting for a server to bring him a can of Colt 45. One of these commercials won a Clio Award in 1975. In the late 60s, the Trio appeared in one commercial alongside Van while performing their routine.

== Bibliography ==
- Greene, Doyle (2007). Politics and the American Television Comedy: A Critical Survey from I Love Lucy through South Park. McFarland. ISBN 978-1-476-60829-7.
