= The Spike Drivers =

US musical group

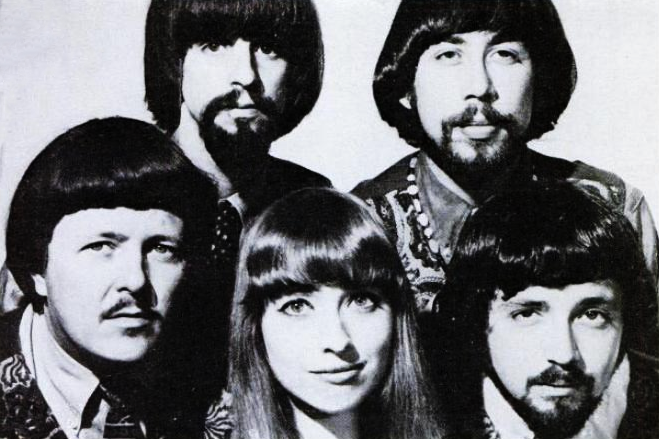
- The Spike Drivers in 1966

Background information
- Origin: Detroit, Michigan
- Genres: Psychedelic pop
- Label: Reprise Records
- Past members: Ted Lucas, Richard Keelan, Sid Brown, Marycarol Brown, Larry Cruse, Steve Booker

The Spike Drivers was a band from Detroit, Michigan and played from 1965 to 1967.

The Spike Drivers began by working in various coffeehouses and clubs in the Detroit, Michigan folk rock music scene. Their music was rooted in folk, blues, and classical music. The band name was suggested by its vocalist Marycarol Brown, originating from a song about John Henry by Mississippi John Hurt called "Spike Driver Blues". The band shared the stage with performers such as Joni Mitchell and Del Shannon.

The band traveled to New York City and landed a recording contract with Warner Brothers Reprise Records where they put out two 45's featuring "Strange Mysterious Sounds" with "Break Out The Wine" and "Often I Wonder" with "High Time." The band was showcased at many clubs in the New York area with the high point occurring when they opened for Eric Burdon and the Animals at the Rheingold Central Park Music Festival in 1966.

Ted Lucas and Richard Keelan left the band in 1967 to record as the Misty Wizards. They were replaced in the Spike Drivers by Marshall Rubinoff and Ron Cobb. After both groups dissolved, Lucas released a self-titled solo album, Keelan relocated to Canada and performed in the Perth County Conspiracy, and Sid Brown released albums as part of the music collective, Peace, Bread & Land Band, who had four LPs between 1969 and 1978. Former member Steve Booker came to be known as Muruga Booker and still records and performs today. Rubinoff, who was married to actress Lin Shaye, relocated from Detroit to San Francisco after his attempts to form another band following the dissolution of the Spike Drivers failed; he died there in a motorcycle accident on July 7, 1968, a few days past his 24th birthday.

== Members ==
- Marycarol Brown - vocals
- Sid Brown - guitar
- Ted Lucas - guitar, vocals
- Richard Keelan - bass, vocals
- Steve Booker - drums
- Larry Cruse - drums (replaced Steve Booker in late 1965)
