= Daisy Ejang =

Daisy Ejang is a Ugandan singer and was a finalist in the 6th series of Tusker Project Fame. She has released several hit singles, including "Shuga" (a project with Levixone), "Yawa De", "Eyes On Me", "Incredible", "Love You Lord", "Fire" and "Teko". She collaborated with Prince Kudakwashe Musarurwa on the track "I Must Stick with You".

She was also in Sunday, a collaboration of various female artists.

== See also ==
- Undercover Brothers Ug
