= Skokiaan =

Single by The African Dance Band of the Cold Storage Commission of Southern Rhodesia
- A-side: "Skokiaan"
- B-side: "In the Mood"
- Recorded: 1947
- Genre: Tsaba-tsaba
- Label: GALLO-Gallotone Records (JIVE GB.1152)
- Songwriter: August Musarurwa (typeset August Msarurgwa in records)

"Skokiaan" is a popular tune originally written by Zimbabwean musician August Musarurwa in the "Tsaba-tsaba" big band-style that succeeded Marabi. "Skokiaan" ("Chikokiyana" in Shona) is an illegal self-made alcoholic beverage.

An early instrumental version was recorded in 1947. Within a year from its 1954 release in South Africa through Gallo Record Company, at least 19 cover versions of "Skokiaan" appeared. The version made in then-Southern Rhodesia reached No. 17 in the United States, while a cover version by Ralph Marterie climbed to No. 3. All versions combined propelled the tune to No. 2 on the Cash Box charts that year. Its popularity extended outside of music, with several urban areas in the United States taking its name.

Artists who produced their own interpretations include The Four Lads, Louis Armstrong, Bill Haley, Herb Alpert, Brave Combo, Hugh Masekela and Kermit Ruffins. The Wiggles also covered this song on their Furry Tales album. The music itself illustrates the mutual influences between Africa and the wider world.

== History ==
=== Original recording in "(Southern) Rhodesia" (nowadays Zimbabwe) ===
"Skokiaan" was originally composed and first recorded as a sax and trumpet instrumental by the "African Dance Band of the Cold Storage Commission of Southern Rhodesia" (the police band of the country now called Zimbabwe) under the leadership of August Musarurwa possibly in 1947 (anthropologist David B. Coplan seems to be the sole source for this date). The band comprised two saxophones, two banjos, traps, and a bass. Several tunes played by the Cold Storage Band were recorded by ethnomusicologist Hugh Tracey in June 1951. On Tracey's recording, Musarurwa also apparently played for "the Chaminuka Band". Musarurwa probably copyrighted Skokiaan in 1952.

Ethnomusicologist Thomas Turino describes Skokiaan as having "a four-bar I-IV-I-V progression in 4/4 meter... The main melodic strain (A) begins with a long held trill... played by the sax on the dominant pitch... followed by an undulating, descending melody. The A strain is contrasted with sections of riffing that follow the harmonic progression fairly closely... before the main melody returns". Towards the end of the original recording a short trumpet solo "is overlapped by Musarurwa's sax". The melody throughout "is carried by the sax".

Skokiaan's significance is that it shows how Africa influenced American jazz in particular and popular music in general. Musarurwa's 1947 and 1954 recordings illustrate how unique the indigenous forms of jazz that emerged in Africa in response to global music trends. While African jazz was influenced from abroad, it also contributed to global trends.

Skokiaan has been adapted to various musical genres, from jazz to mento/reggae (Sugar Belly & the Canefields), and rock and roll. The tune has also been arranged for strings (South Africa's Soweto String Quartet) and steel drums (Trinidad and Tobago's Southern All Stars). A merengue version was recorded in the Dominican Republic by "Antonio Morel y su Orquestra" in the 1950s, with an alto saxophone arrangement by "Felix del Rosario". A number of reggae versions of the song also exist, and marimba covers are particularly popular.

Skokiaan has been recorded many times, initially as part of a wave of world music that swept across the globe in the 1950s, spurred on in Africa by Hugh Tracey and in the United States by Alan Lomax, to name two. Skokiaan gained popularity outside Africa at the same time as another South African record did: "Mbube", a 1939 song by Solomon Linda also known as "Wimoweh", was later released in 1961 as "The Lion Sleeps Tonight" by The Tokens. The sheet music was eventually released in 17 between European and African languages. In France in 1955 the orchestra of Alix Combelle recorded a cover of Skokiaan on the Phillips label. Jacques Hélian also recorded a version. Performers recorded Skokiaan in Finland (Kipparikvartetti), Germany (Bert Kaempfert), and Sweden (Lily Berglund), among others. In the United Kingdom, vocal versions were recorded by South African singers Eve Boswell and Alma Cogan.

=== Versions recorded in the United States ===
However, it was in the United States that Skokiaan peaked on the charts, where it was recorded by a variety of musicians, such as The Four Lads and Johnny Hodges. Hodges' version is notable not only because he recorded the tune with Erroll Garner but also for the reason that his band at the time included John Coltrane, in a minor role.

In 1954 Gallotone Records released a version of Skokiaan by "August Musarurwa and the Bulawayo Sweet Rhythm Band". After 170,000 copies were sold in South Africa, the president of London Records E. R. Lewis, forwarded "a couple of copies" to London's offices in New York. Meanwhile, a pilot had brought the original version from South Africa to the U.S.A., and given it to Bill Randle of the radio station WERE 1300 AM in Cleveland. Although the copy was cracked, Randle was so impressed by what he heard that he asked Walt McQuire of London's New York office to send him a new copy. After Randle played the record four times, interest soared. London Records shipped 6,000 copies to New York from Great Britain, followed in September 1954 by a further 20,000.

Bulawayo Sweet Rhythm's original version took off and reached No. 17 on the Billboard Best Sellers in Stores chart. Whether London Records' was a new recording, or a re-release of the Cold Storage Band's old recording under a new name, is uncertain. The band's original name was changed, no doubt for easier Western consumption, perhaps by the record company or by the band itself.

78 Rpm record of Louis Armstrong's 1954 "Skokiaan" recording (part 1 of 2).

In 1954 covers of "Skokiaan" appeared on United States charts alongside Bulawayo Sweet Rhythm Band's original. The hitmakers included Ralph Marterie, who reached No. 3 on the Cash Box chart. Marterie's instrumental was featured on ABC Radio's The Martin Block Show as "the best new record of the week". It was the first time an instrumental had been selected for the show. A claim that charted versions by Ray Anthony, who supposedly reached No. 18, by Perez Prado, supposedly reached No. 26, and by Louis Armstrong, a Dixieland version said to have reached No. 29, can so far not be verified. On the Cash Box best-selling record charts, where all hit versions were combined, Skokiaan reached No. 2 on 16 October 1954.

English lyrics were added in 1954 by American Tom Glazer for the Canadian group The Four Lads. Glazer is perhaps better known for his 1963 single "On Top of Spaghetti". On 4 August 1954 the Four Lads recorded through Columbia Records the only vocal version of Skokiaan that reached the United States charts, peaking at No. 7 in the Billboard Best Sellers in Stores chart. In line with the spirit of the period, Glazer's lyrics contain what Time arts columnist Richard Corliss describes as jovial "ethnographic condescension": "Oh-far away in Africa / Happy, happy Africa / ...You sing a bingo bango bingo / In hokey pokey skokiaan". Ethnomusicologist Thomas Turino points out that Glazer's depiction of the jungle setting is far removed from the topography of Southern Africa. But its one-size fits "tropical paradise" idea was typical of exotic treatments at the time for songs from Latin America, Asia, and Hawaii.

In music historian Colin Escott’s liner notes of Moments to Remember: The Very Best of the Four Lads (2000), group member/vocal arranger Bernie Toorish recalled the day the Four Lads’s version came to being.

We had an apartment on East 55th Street in New York. The phone rang at seven o'clock one morning. Mitch Miller wants me at his office. I'm there at maybe 8:10. He gives me an acetate and a lead-sheet of "Skokiaan". He said: "Go home, write an arrangement, then go to Neal Hefti's office". I was at Hefti's around 11:00. There were no copying machines then so I wrote it out again by hand. I woke the guys [Connie Codarini, Frank Busseri, Jimmy Arnold] up around noon. We rehearsed, made the record at 7:00 p.m., and it was in the stores two days later. It sold 750,000 copies.

— Bernie Toorish

In August 1954, Louis Armstrong recorded Skokiaan in two parts with Sy Oliver's Orchestra in New York (Decca 29256). Part 1 (the A side) is a purely instrumental version. In contrast, Part 2 (side B) has Armstrong singing the lyrics. (Despite authoritative claims that Armstrong recorded a version entitled "Happy Africa", this cannot so far be substantiated from his discography). On his tour of Africa, Armstrong met Musarurwa in November 1960. Whether both musicians jammed together, or Armstrong just gave Musarurwa a jacket, is unclear. In any case, the difference between the date Armstrong recorded Skokiaan and the date he met Musarurwa appears to invalidate claims that Armstrong did it after he came face to face with Musarurwa.

The Four Lads' version of Skokiaan became the theme song at "Africa U.S.A. Park", a 300-acre (1.2 km^{2}) theme park founded in 1953 at Boca Raton, Florida by John P. Pedersen. The song was played all day long in the parking lot as guests arrived and was sold in the gift shop. The park boasted the largest collection of camels in the United States. After it closed, the site was converted to the "Camino Gardens" subdivision. Other urban areas in the United States apparently influenced by the name of the song are Franklin, Ohio, which boasts a Skokiaan Drive, and Skokie, Illinois, which has a Skokiaan Terrace. Bill Haley & His Comets recorded an instrumental version in 1959 that reached No 70 on the Billboard Hot 100 chart in 1960. With the exception of reissues of "Rock Around the Clock", this would be the band's final chart hit in America.

Skokiaan's popularity tracked the transition to electronic music when an instrumental version was recorded by moog pioneers Hot Butter in 1973 on the album More Hot Butter (preserved as a novelty item replete with "jungle" sounds on the compilation album Incredibly Strange Music Vol. 2). It was not the first such treatment of Skokiaan: Spike Jones and the City Slickers recorded a "Japanese Skokiaan" in 1954, sung with a Japanese accent with lyrics about going to Tokyo, written by band member Freddie Morgan, a banjo player and vocalist (RCA Victor 47-5920). Ringo Starr's 1974 hit "No No Song" was influenced by, and is sometimes listed as a medley with, Skokiaan.

But true to its origins, Skokiaan remained a favourite standard among brass instrumentalists. In 1978, Herb Alpert and Hugh Masekela recorded the song as a brass duet with a Disco flavor for their collaborative album Herb Alpert / Hugh Masekela. The tune put "Alpert on the R&B chart for the first time in his career". One of the most recent brass recordings was by Kermit Ruffins on his 2002 album Big Easy. The song is included as a full-length performance by Kermit Ruffins, Irvin Mayfield and Troy Andrews in the 2005 documentary film Make It Funky!, which presents a history of New Orleans music and its influence on jazz, rhythm and blues, rock and roll, soul and funk.

== Misconceptions ==
Despite its Southern Rhodesian origins, record companies frequently added "South African Song" in brackets to the song's title, as was the case with recordings by Louis Armstrong, the Four Lads, Bill Haley, and Bert Kaempfert. This may have been due to misunderstandings about the difference between what was then Southern Rhodesia and South Africa, two countries in the Southern Africa region. As described in the introduction, "Skokiaan" was composed by a Southern Rhodesian, who was recorded by a South African record company. The lyrics were later added by an American, Tom Glazer. Misled by Glazer's lyrics, some take "Skokiaan" to mean "Happy happy", leading to "Happy Africa" as an alternative title for the music. Again, as stated earlier, the term actually refers to a type of illicitly brewed alcoholic beverage (i.e. "moonshine").

The composer, August Musarurwa, was an ex-policeman, who said that the tune was one played in an illegal shebeen when a police raid was imminent. At the time it was illegal for Africans in Zimbabwe to drink anything but the traditional, low-alcohol beer, and certainly not skokiaan, which was usually laced with methylated spirits - illicit distillation was almost unknown in central Africa at the time.

Why the tune was associated with "a Zulu drinking song", as it was in a 1954 Down Beat article, is unclear. The Zulu is an ethnic grouping found in South Africa; composer August Musarurwa was a Shona from Southern Rhodesia (now Zimbabwe). The term skokiaan does occur in both Zulu and Shona and in the Zulu-based lingua franca, Chilolo. These are part of the Bantu language grouping, so they share similar roots. An early identification of skokiaan as a Zulu word which circulated in Johannesburg's slums is found in a scholarly article by Ellen Hellman, dated 1934. Musarurwa himself did not call his tune "a Zulu drinking song". The scanty fragments of his life history do not reveal that he spent time in South Africa, either. In South Africa there is no popular association of "Skokiaan" with a Zulu song. However Southern Rhodesian migrant labourers moved back and forth between their home country and the mines of South Africa, located mostly around Johannesburg, making it unlikely, but not impossible, that Musarurwa's tune got influenced by a putative Zulu song. Such journeys, often by train, led to the emergence of the song Shosholoza. While Shosholoza has become very popular among South Africans, who often sing it to encourage their sports teams, its origins, like that of "Skokiaan", are Southern Rhodesian.

== Other usages of the name ==
- A six-member band called Skokiaan formed in Liverpool in 1995 to play South African township jazz; they also recorded a version of the song. The Liverpudlians are not the only band with a "Skokiaan"-related name.
- A South African township jazz band, led by Sazi Dlamini, lays claim to Skokiana.

Outside the music world, the name "Skokiaan" has been applied to various artifacts other than songs; the relation between these appellations and Musarurwa's music is unclear:

- a bronze sculpture by German artist Detlef Kraft is called Skokiaan
- a modified version of the Centurion tank was named Skokiaan
- the middle name of Zambian-born Australian rugby player George Gregan is Musarurwa.
- No No Song by Ringo Starr is sometimes listed as “No No Song/Skokiaan”

== Chart positions ==
Cash Box Best Selling Singles (1954)	Peak position
Ralph Marterie & Orchestra–Mercury 70432	2
Four Lads–Columbia 40306	
Bulawayo Sweet Rhythm Band–London 1491	
U.S. Billboard Best Sellers in Stores (1954)	Peak position
Ralph Marterie & Orchestra–Mercury 70432	3
Four Lads–Columbia 40306	7
Bulawayo Sweet Rhythm Band–London 1491	17
U.S. Billboard Hot 100 (1954)	Peak position
Ralph Marterie & Orchestra–Mercury 70432	22
U.S. Billboard Hot 100 (1960)	Peak position
Bill Haley & His Comets	70

== Chronological list of all versions ==
"Skokiaan" has been recorded by these artists, and others:

Year	Artist	Label	Artist's country of origin
1950	The African Dance Band of the Cold Storage Commission of Southern Rhodesia	GALLO-Gallotone JIVE GB.1152	Zimbabwe
1953	Jacques Hélian and his orchestra		France
1954	The Shytans	Bruce Records	USA
	Bulawayo Sweet Rhythm Band	London Records 1491/ Decca F10350	Zimbabwe
	Alma Cogan	His Master's Voice 7M 269	UK
	Bud Isaacs	RCA 47-5844	USA
	Enoch Light Brigade Orchestra	Waldorf Music Hall 3304	USA
	The Four Lads with Neal Hefti Orchestra	Columbia Records 40306	Canada
	Jimmy Carroll and Orchestra	Bell Records 1060 306	USA
	Preston Sandiford's Orchestra	Big 4 Hits Records #103-8504	USA
	Johnny Hodges and His Orchestra	Norgran 124	USA
	Lily Berglund	Karusell K 99.S.1954	Sweden
	Louis Armstrong	Decca 29256	USA
	Olavi Virta	Helmi 450162	Finland
	Jerry Mengo et son orchestre	Ducretet-Thomson 460V041, 500V057	France
	Perez Prado	RCA Victor 47-5839	Cuba/ Mexico
	Ralph Marterie	Mercury Records 70432	Italy/ USA
	Ray Anthony	Capitol F-2896	USA
	Reino Helismaa		Finland
	Ted Heath	Decca F10368, Dutton Laboratories/ Vocalion CDLK 4251	UK
1955	Alix Combelle and his orchestra	Philips 432025NE; N 76.046 R	France
	Chris Barber's Jazz Band	PolyGram	UK
	Kipparikvartetti	Triola trlp 101	Finland
1956	Johnny Gomez & Orchestra	Cook Records/Smithsonian COOK01180	Trinidad
1957	Southern All Stars	Cook Records/ Smithsonian Folkways Recordings	Trinidad
1958	Alix Combelle et son orchestre	Philips 432.232 BE	France
	Ivo Robić	Jugoton, Zagreb SY 1025	Yugoslavia
1959	Bill Haley & His Comets	Decca 9-31030 and ED 2671	USA
	Nico Carstens and his Orchestra and Chorus	Columbia 33JSX 11015	South Africa
1961	The Fayros	RCA E 3.50; RCA Victor 47-7914	USA
1962	Bert Kaempfert	Polydor 825 494-2	Germany
	Oliver Nelson	RCA 62VK701	USA
1963	Bill Black's Combo	Hi-3	USA
	Paul Anka	RCA2614-STEREO	Canada
1964	H. B. Barnum	Imperial Records 66046	USA
	Johnny Baldini	Combo Record 404	Italia
1965	Bob Moore	Hickory Records # 1357	USA
	Carl Stevens	Mercury Records PPS 6030	
	James Last	Polydor 249 043	Germany
	The Shangaans	EMI Records TWO 109; Columbia Mono 33JSX 76; Columbia Stereo Studio Two 109J	South Africa
1967	Desmond Dekker (as "Pretty Africa")	Pyramid PYR6020	Jamaica
	Zlatni Dečaci	Jugoton EPY 3745	Yugoslavia
1968	Blind Hog	Vulcan V-106	
1969	Sound Dimension (as "African Chant")	Studio One	Jamaica
1970	Nico Carstens	Columbia SCXJ 11188	South Africa
1972	Sugar Belly and the Canefields	Port-O-Jam Records	Jamaica
1973	Hot Butter	Musicor MS-3254	USA
	James, Jill and Jackson	Imperial 5C 006-24845	Netherlands and Belgium
	The Pasadena Roof Orchestra		UK
1974	Josh Graves	Epic KE-33168	USA
	Matti Kuusla	Rondo rolp 10 LP	Finland
1978	Herb Alpert and Hugh Masekela	A&M/Horizon Records 0819	USA/ South Africa
	Kai Hyttinen	Gold disc gdl 2001 LP	Finland
	Snowmen	Gold disc gds 202 45	Finland
1981	Prima Vera (spelled "Skokiian")	Falsk/RCA Victor/Sonet	Norway
1984	Brave Combo	Four Dots FD1010	USA
1986	Vesa-Matti Loiri	Flamingo fgl 4004	Finland
1992	Boka Marimba	Dandemutande 9	USA
1994	Chaia Marimba	Dandemutande 87-C	USA
1995	Liberación	Disa 2016	Mexico
1996	African Jazz Pioneers	Intuition CD INT 3099-2	South Africa
	Sauli Lehtonen	Mtv mtvcd 101	Finland
	Boka Marimba	Dandemutande 143-C	USA
1997	Kushinga Marimba Ensemble	Dandemutande 249-T	Zimbabwe
1998	Zimbira	Dandemutande CD	Australia
1999	Joe Goldmark	HMG3009	USA
	Skokiaan		UK
	Zambezi Marimba Band	Dandemutande 254-C	USA
2000	Boereqanga	Nebula Bos Records	South Africa
	Proteus 7	Dorian xCD-90266	USA
2002	The African Jazz Pioneers	Gallo	South Africa
	Fessor's Big City Band	Storyville STC1014247	Denmark
	Kermit Ruffins	Basin Street Records	USA
	Kutsinhira Cultural Arts Center	Dandemutande 389-C	USA
2003	Boka Marimba	Dandemutande 483-C	USA
	Soweto String Quartet	BMG Africa CDCLL 7052	South Africa
2005	Jimmy Smith	Empire Musicwerks/Hot JWP Music	USA
	Kuzanga Marimba	Dandemutande 609-C	USA
	Masanga Marimba Ensemble	Dandemutande 600-C	USA
	St.-Petersburg Ska-Jazz Review	ШнурОК	Russian Federation
2006	Binnsmead Marimba		USA
	Zinindika Mirimba	Dandemutande 638-C	USA
2013	The Wiggles	Furry Tales (ABC Music)	Australia

Versions whose release dates are not known

Artist	Label	Artist's country of origin
Roland Alphonso	Jah Life	Jamaica
Barsextett Ralph Dokin	CBS	
Chikoro Marimba		Canada
Gayle Larson and the Toppers	Tops-EP-242	
Lonnie Donegan	Xtra 26533	
The Mertens Brothers		Belgium
The Pasadena Roof Orchestra	Transatlantic Records	USA
Ray Colignon	Philips P 10404	Belgium
The Revelairs		USA
The Titans		
The Vikings	RCA Victor 71.300	
Antonio Morel Y Su Orquesta		

== See also ==
- August Msarurgwa, Zimbabwean composer and first recorder of the song
- Tom Glazer, American singer who added lyrics to the 1954 version
- Marimba, because many arrangements of the song with this instrument were popular
