= Robert Maxwell (songwriter) =

- Born: Max Rosen; April 19, 1921; New York City, New York, United States
- Died: February 7, 2012 (aged 90)
- Occupations: Musician, songwriter
- Instrument: Harp
- Label: MGM Records
- Formerly of: National Symphony Orchestra

Robert Maxwell (born Max Rosen; April 19, 1921 – February 7, 2012) was an American harpist, songwriter, and teacher who wrote the music for two well-known songs: "Ebb Tide" and "Shangri-La" (originally a composition entitled "Fantasy for Harp"). He also wrote "Solfeggio", used in a repeated skit by entertainment television innovator Ernie Kovacs.

Maxwell was the father of modern dancer Carla Maxwell, artistic director of The José Limón Dance Company. He and his two brothers, Abe Rosen (1916–2007) and Myor Rosen (1917–2009), all played the harp professionally. Abe Rosen was known for his work playing in New York shows and Myor Rosen was the principal harpist for the New York Philharmonic for thirty years.

== Early life ==
Maxwell was born in New York City. Neither of his parents had been involved in music, but at age 10 he began playing the harp. In high school, he won a scholarship to the Juilliard School of Music. At age 17, he became the youngest member of the National Symphony Orchestra. He also gave solo performances in both New York and Los Angeles. Among the conductors he performed under were Arturo Toscanini and Serge Koussevitsky.

He eventually found himself in the United States Coast Guard in the 11th Naval District Coast Guard Band commanded by Rudy Vallee, giving him the opportunity to play the harp in a popular music context. Vallee arranged tours where he performed for servicemembers, and he developed a talent for playing in a more down-to-earth style. The band went to the South Pacific, including the Philippines and New Guinea.

He entered a contest on radio station KFI in Los Angeles, failing to make the finals but gaining second prize. This led to many appearances on radio, television, and the movies, including one summer as replacement for Frank Sinatra on the Columbia Broadcasting System (CBS) network.

== Later life and work ==
Maxwell went on to devising his own arrangements, and composed three songs for which he is remembered: "Little Dipper" (1959, recorded under the name The Mickey Mozart Quintet) peaked at #30 on the Billboard Hot 100, "Ebb Tide" (1953) was a perennial favorite, and "Shangri-La" was a hit in 1957 for The Four Coins and 1969 for The Lettermen. Maxwell's own instrumental version, featuring an organ solo rather than his harp, which is heard in the introduction as well as in the coda of the song, reached #15 on the Billboard Hot 100 in 1964.

Another of his songs, "Solfeggio," performed by Maxwell's orchestra and the Ray Charles Singers, gained unexpected fame as the theme for Ernie Kovacs's recurring comedy sketch, The Nairobi Trio. The song was originally recorded in 1953 for MGM Records, which was the version Kovacs used; it was reissued in 1957 as "Song of the Nairobi Trio," which became the permanent title for the song. Maxwell re-recorded it for Kapp Records in 1961, credited to "The Fortune Tellers," and recorded a third arrangement in 1966 as "Robert Maxwell, His Harp and Orchestra."

Several of Maxwell's students, such as Joan Dolores Wilson, went on to compose and play harp professionally.

In the early 1970s, he changed his first name to Bobby to avoid confusion with the British publisher of the same name and issued LPs as such for the Command/ABC label under "Bobby Maxwell". He also wrote Lost Patrol, which became the original theme music for the long-running Australian current affairs program Four Corners, on ABC-TV.
