= The Vikings (South African band) =

Former South African musical group

The Vikings were a band from South Africa. Between 1959 and 1961 Manfred Mann and his childhood friend Saul Ozynski recorded two albums as the Vikings.
