= August Msarurgwa =

Zimbabwean composer

August Machona Musarurwa (c. 1920s–1968), usually identified as August Msarurgwa on record labels, was a Zimbabwean jazz saxophonist and vocalist, best known for having composed the 1950s hit tune "Skokiaan" (also known as "Skokiyana" or "Skokian"). He is associated with Bulawayo jazz.

== Biography ==
August Musarurwa was born around 1920 or 1925. He grew up in the Lomagundi District (in an area that is now part of Zvimba District) of Mashonaland, in northern British South Africa Company-administered Southern Rhodesia, today Zimbabwe. He attended Marshall Hartley Primary School before moving to the capital city, Salisbury (today Harare), to find work.

After working as a clerk for a tobacco company, he joined the British South African Police as a 22-year-old. The BSAP employed Musarurwa as an interpreter, but later he was transferred to the police band.

He left the BSAP to work for the Bulawayo Cold Storage Commission, living in the company's compound. As leader of the African Dance Band of the Cold Storage Commission of Southern Rhodesia, Musarurwa recorded "Skokiaan" as an instrumental in 1947. A second version of the tune was released in the United States by London Records in 1954 under the name of the Bulawayo Sweet Rhythms Band, as Musarurwa's band was then called.

Musarurwa met Louis Armstrong in November 1960 during the latter's African tour. According to his daughter, Armstrong gave Musarurwa a jacket and invited him to visit the United States. The visit was cancelled due to the death in 1962 of Tandiwe, Musarurwa's wife.

August Musarurwa died in 1968 and is buried in his family cemetery in his village near Zvimba. The inscription on his grave reads, "Here lies August Machona Musarurwa, great singer and music composer, renowned the world over".

== See also ==
- Skokiaan
