= Gershon Kingsley =

German-American composer and musician (1922–2019)

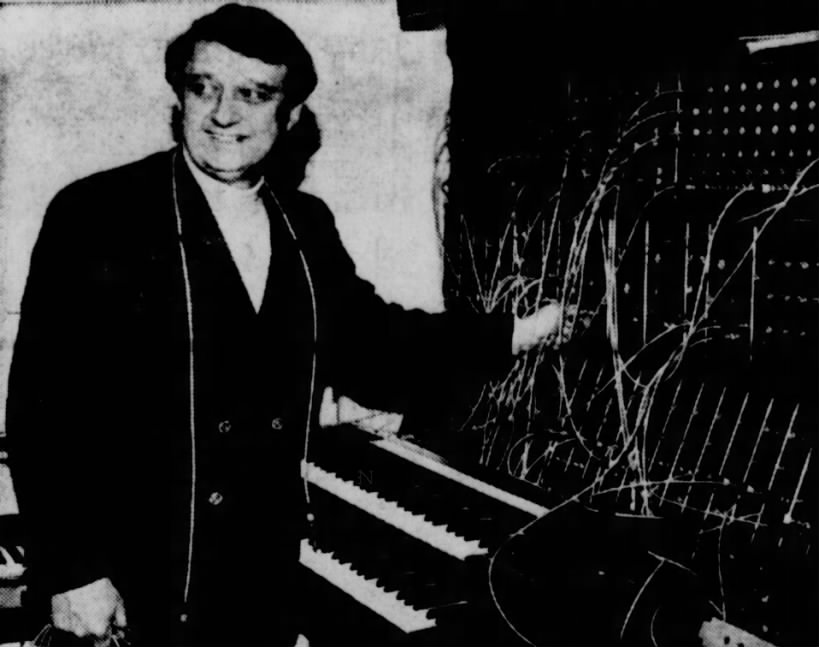
- Kingsley with a Moog synthesizer, 1970

Background information
- Also known as: Gershon Kingsley
- Born: Götz Gustav Ksinski; October 28, 1922; Bochum, Weimar Republic
- Died: December 10, 2019 (aged 97) Manhattan, New York, U.S.
- Genres: Electronic, classical, pop, sacred, crossover
- Occupations: Composer, arranger, keyboardist, conductor
- Instruments: Synthesizer, piano
- Years active: 1954–2019
- Formerly of: Perrey and Kingsley, First Moog Quartet

Gershon Kingsley (born Götz Gustav Ksinski; October 28, 1922 – December 10, 2019) was a German-American composer, a pioneer of electronic music and the Moog synthesizer, a partner in the electronic music duo Perrey and Kingsley, founder of the First Moog Quartet, and writer of rock-inspired compositions for Jewish religious ceremonies. Kingsley is most famous for his 1969 influential electronic instrumental composition "Popcorn", and his composition of the WGBH-TV Soundmark.

Kingsley conducted and arranged many Broadway musicals, and he composed for film, television shows and commercials. His compositions were eclectic and vary between avant-garde and pop styles. Kingsley also composed classical chamber works, and his opera Raoul was premiered in Bremen, Germany in 2008. His work was recognized with a Tony Award nomination for Best Conductor and Musical Director, two Clio Awards for his work in advertising music, and a Lifetime Achievement Award from the Bob Moog Foundation. Kingsley died on December 10, 2019, at the age of 97 in Manhattan, New York.

== Biography ==
=== Early life ===
Kingsley was born Götz Gustav Ksinski in 1922 in Bochum, Weimar Republic, the son of Marie Christina, a homemaker, and Max Ksinski, a carpet dealer and pianist. His father was born Jewish and his mother, originally Catholic, converted to Judaism. He grew up in Berlin where his parents ran a large carpet shop. They had originally met in Essen, when his father, returning from Berlin on a business trip, had dropped in to a wine bar managed by two sisters, one of whom soon became Kingsley's mother. The elder Ksinski had spent the evening playing the piano in the bar, after which romance quickly blossomed.

In 1938, while his parents and brother made their way to Cuba and, ultimately, the United States, Kingsley traveled via Genoa to Palestine and joined a kibbutz:

We were all very happy in the kibbutz. We were in Palestine. It was such a great experience to be sort of in our own country ("... quasi in unserem eigenen Land zu sein"). In the mornings we worked in the fields, and in the afternoons we attended classes on farming. Half of us were boys, the other half girls. We talked, we danced, we were in love: we were free and the Nazis were far away. It was like an oasis. It was such a wonderful wonderful wonderful time.

— Gershon Kingsley, quoted in 2014 by Tobias Feld

As his father was Jewish, he fled from Nazi Germany in 1938 a few days before Kristallnacht and joined kibbutz Ein Harod, Mandatory Palestine where the 15-year-old, self-taught musician began his career in music. His parents stayed behind at that time. At the kibbutz he taught himself to play the piano. He joined the Hagana Jewish Settlement Police (Notrim) and also played jazz in Tel Aviv and Jerusalem. He studied at the Jerusalem conservatory of music. His parents and brother had escaped to Cuba, from where, eventually, they succeeded in obtaining visas for the United States, where Kingsley met up with them eight years later. After World War II, Kingsley emigrated to America where he became a pit conductor for Broadway musical shows. In 1946 after graduating from the Los Angeles Conservatory of Music, he adopted the pseudonym “Gershon” in tribute to the son of Moses.

=== Musical career ===
In 1964, Kingsley worked as an arranger at Vanguard Records, and in 1965, after ceasing to be a colleague of the avant-garde composer John Cage, he met and formed a duet known as Perrey and Kingsley with the French musician Jean-Jacques Perrey, they released two albums:The In Sound from Way Out! in 1966 and Kaleidoscopic Vibrations in 1967, and subsequently went their separate ways. A song written by Kingsley and Perrey, "Baroque Hoedown" (from their 1967 album) was used by Walt Disney Productions for the Main Street Electrical Parade theme parks; and the song "The Savers", best known as the theme for the game show The Joker's Wild from 1972 to 1975 on CBS, and for the1977-1978 season when the series returned in syndication. He would go on to fame in 1968 as the Clio Award–winning music for a television advertising for No-Cal diet drinks.

Embarking upon a solo career, Kingsley, in 1969, released on Audio Fidelity Records, the album Music to Moog By, an album consisting of covers of popular songs, some of which were by Ludwig van Beethoven and The Beatles as "Für Elise", "Nowhere Man" and "Paperback Writer", while others were traditional like the British ballad "Scarborough Fair". Music to Moog By also contains original works such as "Hey, Hey" co-written by Eileen Davies, used as a pregame theme on NBC Sports' baseball telecasts in the 1970s, and sampled years later by RJD2 on the song "The Horror". Another of his original tracks is "Popcorn", his signature song. The single released from this album was "Nowhere Man", with Sunset Sound as the b-side.

His next musical effort was with a band called First Moog Quartet in 1970: As the result of a request by famous impresario Sol Hurok to hear the Moog synthesizer's capabilities demonstrated live. Other group members included Howard Salat, Stan Free, Eric W. Knight, and Ken Bichel. On January 30, 1970, the group became the first to ever play electronic music in Carnegie Hall. With Robert Moog present, they were accompanied by several other musicians and four singers. While reactions were mixed, immediate results included a university tour and some interesting collaborative works with the Boston Pops Orchestra.

They recorded one 1970 album entitled First Moog Quartet, on Audio Fidelity Records, which consisted of live recordings from his nationwide tour featuring four Moog synthesizers. Some of these compositions are more experimental, featuring spoken word and beat poetry backed by synthetic noises and tones. Kingsley then moved beyond the Moog, and later pioneered the use of the earliest Fairlight and Synclavier digital synthesizers. Arthur Fiedler asked Kingsley to write a Concerto for Moog; the quartet performed the work, scored for synthesizer quartet and symphony orchestra, with the Boston Pops in 1971. He also wrote the logo sting (animated logo accompanied with music) for WGBH-TV in Boston, that appears throughout the United States on PBS programming produced by the station.

== Discography ==
- 1960: Love and Laughter (with Davey Karr & Betty Walker)
- 1962: Helen Jacobson Presents Fly Blackbird Original Cast Album (with Clarence Bernard Jackson)
- 1963: Shoshana! (as conductor)
- 1964: Mozart After Hours (as conductor, arranger, harpsichordist) (with Maureen Forrester & Wiener Akademie Kammerchor)
- 1964: Jan Peerce on 2nd Avenue (as conductor, arranger)
- 1965: Fleury — The Isles of Greece (as arranger, conductor)
- 1966: The In Sound from Way Out! (with Perrey)
- 1966: New Songs of the Auvergne — Netania Davrath (as orchestrator)
- 1966: Jan Peerce — Art of the Cantor (as conductor, arranger)
- 1967: Kaleidoscopic Vibrations: Electronic Pop Music from Way Out (with Perrey)
- 1968: Shabbat '68
- 1968: The New Exciting Voice of Sol Zimel — Favorite Jewish Melodies (as arranger, conductor)
- 1969: Jan Peerce Neapolitan Serenade
- 1969: Music to Moog By (also a single from this album Nowhere Man b/w Sunset Sound)
- 1970: First Moog Quartet
- 1970: Gershwin (Alive & Well & Underground)
- 1971: Greta Keller Sings Love Is A Daydream And Other Songs By Yulya
- 1971: Kaleidoscopic Vibrations: Spotlight on the Moog (re-release of 1967 Kaleidoscopic Vibrations album under other name)
- 1972: Popcorn (with his band First Moog Quartet)
- 1973: The Best Of The Moog
- 1974: The 5th Cup Featuring Theodore Bikel
- 1975: Incredible Synthesizer
- 1975: The Essential Perrey & Kingsley
- 1980: Julia Migenes Latin Lady (as producer, conductor, arranger)
- 1982: Julia Migenes-Johnson Sings Gershwin (as conductor, arranger)
- 1986: Much Silence
- 1987: Das Schönste Von Julia Migenes
- 1989: Cruisers 1.0
- 1990: Anima
- 2001: The Out Sound from Way In! The Complete Vanguard Recordings
- 2005: Voices from the Shadow
- 2006: God Is a Moog
- 2007: Vanguard Visionaries: Perrey & Kingsley
- 2012: The Electronic Pop Songs
- 2012: Space Age Computer Music

== Filmography ==
- 1969 Sam's Song
- 1970 The Dreamer (Ha-Timhoni)
- 1972 Silent Night, Bloody Night
- 1973 Sugar Cookies

=== Broadway productions ===
- The Entertainer musical director (February 12, 1958 – May 10, 1958)
- La Plume de Ma Tante musical director (November 11, 1958 – December 17, 1960)
- Vintage '60 arranger, musical director (September 12, 1960 – September 17, 1960)
- Josephine Baker musical director (February 4, 1964 – February 16, 1964)
- Cafe Crown vocal arranger, musical director (April 17, 1964 – April 18, 1964)
- I'm Solomon vocal arranger, musical director (April 23, 1968 – April 27, 1968)

=== Off-Broadway productions ===
- Ernest in Love arranger (opened May 4, 1960)
- Fly Blackbird! arranger, musical director (opened February 2, 1962)
- King of the Whole Damn World arranger (opened April 14, 1962)
- Put it in Writing arranger, pianist (opened May 13, 1963)
- The Cradle Will Rock musical director, Clerk (opened November 8, 1964)
- Hotel Passionato orchestrator, musical director (opened October 22, 1965)
- Great Scot! additional musical arrangements, musical director (opened November 10, 1965)
- Hooray! It's a Glorious Day ... and all that orchestrator (opened March 3, 1966)

== See also ==
- Jean-Jacques Perrey
- Popcorn
- Baroque Hoedown
- WGBH
