= Perth County Conspiracy =

- Origin: Stratford, Ontario, Canada
- Genres: Psychedelic folk
- Years active: 1969–1977
- Labels: Columbia
- Past members: Richard Keelan; Cedric Smith; Terry Jones; Michael Butler; George Taros; David Woodhead; Jerome Jarvis; Larry Brown; Paul Gellman; Peter Cheyne; Dorit Learned; Bob Burchill; David Balser

Perth County Conspiracy, also known as Perth County Conspiracy (does not exist) was a Canadian psychedelic folk music group based in Stratford, Ontario, active during the 1970s. Their music is characterised by its message-oriented lyrics and unconventional arrangements.

== History ==
Perth County Conspiracy was formed in 1969. The founding members were guitarist-singers Richard Keelan (formerly of the American band The Spike Drivers) and Cedric Smith, who were joined by Terry Jones (guitar, vocals), Michael Butler (bass), George Taros (piano, vocals), and other friends and family members. The group first played in Toronto in late 1968 or early 1969.

During the 1970s a number of others were a part of the Conspiracy, including David Woodhead, Jerome Jarvis, Larry Brown, Paul Gellman, Peter Cheyne, and Dorit Learned. In the mid-1960s through to the late 1970s, the Perth County Conspiracy would play nightly at Harry Finlay's Black Swan Coffee House in Stratford, Ontario, usually following the evening performances at the Stratford Shakespearean Festival Theatre. Oftentimes they would play until almost 4 a.m. The band organized an annual picnic on the opening night of the festival. The group also toured across Canada playing at universities and also at Massey Hall. Their singles "You've Got To Know " and "Uncle Jed" reached numbers 59 and 76 on the Canadian charts.

The band signed with the Columbia label in 1970, and recorded two albums. The 1970 self-titled album features Shakespearian dialogue and audio collage elements mixed with folk and folk rock music that might place it in the genre of psychedelic folk. Alive, recorded in 1971, was a live concert album.

The band then went independent and released a string of records on their own. Bob Burchill (guitar, vocals) joined the group in 1973. The group remain active until at least 1977.

Around 1990, former members of the band began to reunite once a year at a Black Swan Coffee House Revival in Stratford in support of homelessness in Perth County. In 2011, the CBC radio show Inside the Music featured an hour-long exploration of the group and their music.

== Discography ==
- Does Not Exist (Columbia, 1970, EKL-375) (#56 Can)
- The Perth County Conspiracy (CBC Radio, 1970)
- Alive (2 LPs, Columbia, 1971, GES-90037) (#72 Can)
- What School Bus Tour (Rumour/Mushroom, 1973, RUMOUR-II)
- Breakout to Berlin (Rumour, 1975, RUMOUR-V), also released as Kanada (Amiga 855 424 in GDR)
- Ten Lost Years—And Then Some (Rumour, 1977)
