= The Whole Funk & Nothing but the Funk: Definitive Funkadelic 1976–1981 =

The Whole Funk & Nothing But the Funk: Definitive Funkadelic 1976–1981

Greatest hits album by Funkadelic
- Released: March 2005
- Recorded: 1976–1981
- Genre: Funk
- Label: Metro Music

The Whole Funk & Nothing But the Funk is a 2005 compilation album by Funkadelic featuring songs recorded for Warner Bros. Records during the band's career with that label from 1976 to 1981. No Funkadelic recordings from any other record labels or time periods are included. The compilation includes two rarities: instrumental versions of "One Nation Under a Groove" and "The Electric Spanking of War Babies" that had originally appeared as B-sides.

In 2011, the compilation was re-released as You Got The Funk We Got The Funk.

== Track listing ==
Disc One

1. "One Nation Under a Groove" (Clinton, Shider, Morrison)
2. "Cholly (Funk Gettin' Ready To Roll)" (William Collins, Morrison, George Clinton)
3. "Smokey" (George Clinton, Gary Shider)
4. "Comin' Round The Mountain" (George Clinton, Cook)
5. "(Not Just) Knee Deep, Pt. 1" (George Clinton Jr.)
6. "You Scared The Lovin' Outta Me" (George Clinton, Goins)
7. "Cosmic Slop (Live)" (George Clinton, Bernie Worrell)
8. "Brettino's Bounce" (Fratangelo)
9. "Into You" (George Clinton, Bernie Collins, Morrison)
10. "Maggot Brain (Live)" (Eddie Hazel, George Clinton)
11. "Holly Wants To Go To California" (George Clinton, Bernie Worrell)

Disc Two

1. "The Electric Spanking Of War Babies" (Clinton, Bishop, Morrison)
2. "If You Got Funk, You Got Style" (Clinton, Collins, Worrell)
3. "Freak Of The Week" (Clinton, Bishop, McKnight)
4. "Funk Gets Stronger (Killer Millimeter Longer Version)" (Stewart, Clinton)
5. "Soul Mate" (Clinton, Cook)
6. "Who Says A Funk Band Can't Play Rock?!" (Clinton, Morrison, Hampton)
7. "Oh, I" (Curtis, Shider, Clinton)
8. "Electro-Cuties" (Ford, Ali, Clinton)
9. "Promentalshitbackwashpsychosis Enema Squad (The Doodoo Chasers)" (Clinton, Shider, Brown)
10. "One Nation Under a Groove [Instrumental Version]" (Clinton, Shider, Morrison)
11. "The Electric Spanking Of War Babies [Instrumental Version]" (Clinton, Bishop, Morrison)
