= Funkadelic discography =

- Studio albums: 14
- Live albums: 1
- Compilation albums: 18
- Singles: 25

Discography of Funkadelic, influential George Clinton-led funk music group.

== Albums ==
=== Studio albums ===
==== Funkadelic ====
Title	Album details	Peak chart positions			Certifications (sales thresholds)
Title	Album details	US	US R&B	UK	Certifications (sales thresholds)
Funkadelic	Released: February 24, 1970; Label: Westbound; Formats: Vinyl, CD	126	8	—	
Free Your Mind... and Your Ass Will Follow	Released: July 20, 1970; Label: Westbound; Formats: Vinyl, CD	92	11	—	
Maggot Brain	Released: July 12, 1971; Label: Westbound; Formats: Vinyl, CD, cassette	108	14	—	
America Eats Its Young	Released: May 22, 1972; Label: Westbound; Formats: Vinyl, CD	123	22	—	
Cosmic Slop	Released: July 9, 1973; Label: Westbound; Formats: Vinyl, Compact disc	112	21	—	
Standing on the Verge of Getting It On	Released: July 9, 1974; Label: Westbound; Formats: Vinyl, CD	163	13	—	
Let's Take It to the Stage	Released: April 21, 1975; Label: Westbound; Formats: Vinyl, Compact disc	102	14	—	
Tales of Kidd Funkadelic	Released: September 21, 1976; Label: Westbound; Formats: Vinyl, CD	103	14	—	
Hardcore Jollies	Released: October 29, 1976; Label: Warner Bros.; Formats: Vinyl, CD, cassette	96	12	—	
One Nation Under a Groove	Released: September 22, 1978; Label: Warner Bros.; Formats: Vinyl, CD	16	1	56	RIAA: Platinum
Uncle Jam Wants You	Released: September 21, 1979; Label: Warner Bros.; Formats: Vinyl, CD	18	2	—	RIAA: Gold
The Electric Spanking of War Babies	Released: April 14, 1981; Label: Warner Bros.; Formats: Vinyl, Compact disc	105	41	—	
By Way of the Drum	Released: May 15, 2007; Label: Hip-O; Formats: CD	—	—	—	
First Ya Gotta Shake the Gate	Released: November 25, 2014; Label: The C Kunspyruhzy; Formats: Digital/MP3	—	—	—	

==== Fuzzy Haskins, Calvin Simon, and Grady Thomas recording as Funkadelic ====
List of albums, with selected chart positions
Title	Album details	Peak chart positions			Certifications (sales thresholds)
Title	Album details	US	US R&B	UK	Certifications (sales thresholds)
Connections & Disconnections	Released: 1980; Label: Avenue; Formats: Vinyl, CD	151	45	—	

=== Live albums ===
Title	Album details
Live: Meadowbrook, Rochester, Michigan – 12th September 1971	Label: Westbound; Released: May 7, 1996; Format: CD

=== Compilation albums ===
Title	Album details
Funkadelic's Greatest Hits	Released: 1975; Label: Westbound; Format: Vinyl
The Best of the Early Years Volume One	Released: 1977; Label: Westbound; Format: Vinyl
Music For Your Mother: Funkadelic 45s	Released: 1993; Label: Westbound; Format: Vinyl / CD (double)
Hardcore Funk Jam	Released: 1994; Label: Charly; Format: CD
The Best of Funkadelic: 1976–1981	Released: 1994; Label: Charly; Format: CD
Finest	Released: 1994; Label: Westbound; Format: CD
Ultimate Funkadelic	Released: 1997; Label: Music Club; Format: CD
The Very Best of Funkadelic 1976–1981	Released: 1998; Label: Charly; Format: CD
The Best	Released: 1999; Label: Neon; Format: CD
Funk Gets Stronger	Released: 2000; Label: Recall; Format: CD
The Complete Recordings 1976–81	Released: 2000; Label: Charly; Format: CD
Cosmic Slop	Released: 2000; Label: Castle Music; Format: D
Suitably Funky	Released: July 25, 2000; Label: Castle Music; Format: CD
The Original Cosmic Funk Crew	Released: September, 2000; Label: Metro Music; Format: CD
Motor City Madness: The Ultimate Funkadelic Westbound Compilation	Released: 2003; Label: Westbound; Format: CD
The Whole Funk & Nothing But The Funk : Definitive Funkadelic 1976–1981	Released: February 7, 2005; Label: Metro Music; Format: CD
Funkadelic	Label: Disky; Released: 2007; Format: CD
Toys	Released: November 2008; Label: Westbound; Formats: Vinyl, CD
Reworked by Detroiters	Released: 2017; Label: P-Vine Records, Westbound; Format: Vinyl, CD

== Singles ==
Title	Year	Peak chart positions				Album
Title	Year	US	US R&B	US Dance	UK	Album
"Music for My Mother"	1969	—	50	—	—	Funkadelic
"I'll Bet You"	1969	63	22	—	—	Funkadelic
"I Got a Thing, You Got a Thing, Everybody's Got a Thing"	1970	80	30	—	—	Funkadelic
"I Wanna Know If It's Good to You?"	1970	81	27	—	—	Free Your Mind... and Your Ass Will Follow
"You and Your Folks, Me and My Folks"	1971	91	42	—	—	Maggot Brain
"Can You Get to That"	1971	93	44	—	—	Maggot Brain
"Hit It and Quit It"	1972	—	—	—	—	Maggot Brain
"A Joyful Process"	1972	—	38	—	—	America Eats Its Young
"Loose Booty"	1973	118	49	—	—	America Eats Its Young
"Cosmic Slop"	1973	—	—	—	—	Cosmic Slop
"Standing on the Verge of Getting It On"	1974	—	27	—	—	Standing on the Verge of Getting It On
"Red Hot Mama"	1975	—	73	—	—	Standing on the Verge of Getting It On
"Get Off Your Ass and Jam"	1975	—	—	—	—	Let's Take It to the Stage
"Better by the Pound"	1975	99	—	—	—	Let's Take It to the Stage
"Let's Take It to the Stage"	1976	—	89	—	—	Let's Take It to the Stage
"Undisco Kidd"	1976	102	30	—	—	Tales of Kidd Funkadelic
"Comin' Round the Mountain"	1977	—	54	—	—	Hardcore Jollies
"Smokey"	1977	—	96	—	—	Hardcore Jollies
"One Nation Under a Groove"	1978	28	1	31	9	One Nation Under a Groove
"Cholly (Funk Getting Ready to Roll!)"	1979	—	43	—	—	One Nation Under a Groove
"(Not Just) Knee Deep"	1979	77	1	43	—	Uncle Jam Wants You
"Uncle Jam"	1979	—	53	—	—	Uncle Jam Wants You
"Connections and Disconnections"	1981	—	68	—	—	Connections & Disconnections
"The Electric Spanking of War Babies"	1981	—	60	—	—	The Electric Spanking of War Babies
"Shockwaves"	1981	—	—	—	—	The Electric Spanking of War Babies
"The Naz"	2014	—	—	—	—	First Ya Gotta Shake the Gate
"Ain't That Funkin' Kinda Hard on You?"	2014	—	—	—	—	First Ya Gotta Shake the Gate
"—" denotes releases that did not chart.
