= Motor City Madness: The Ultimate Funkadelic Westbound Compilation =

Compilation album by Funkadelic
- Released: 2003
- Genres: Progressive soul; funk; rock
- Length: 147:23
- Label: Westbound

Professional ratings
Review scores
Source	Rating
AllMusic	5/5 stars
Blender	5/5 stars
Pitchfork	9.8/10
Uncut	4/5 stars

Motor City Madness is a compilation album by the American funk rock band Funkadelic, released in 2003 by Westbound Records. It features a selection of songs previously released on the band's original albums for Westbound from 1970 to 1976. The compilation's 29 tracks span the length of two discs. Music critic Robert Christgau has said that, "for those with the heart for it, this is their most listenable album."

== Track listing ==
Disc one
No.	Title	Writer(s)	Original album	Length
1.	"Free Your Mind and Your Ass Will Follow"	Clinton, Hazel, Davis	Free Your Mind... and Your Ass Will Follow	10:04
2.	"Red Hot Mama"	Clinton	Standing on the Verge of Getting It On	3:24
3.	"You Can't Miss What You Can't Measure"	Clinton, Barnes	Cosmic Slop	3:03
4.	"Standing on the Verge of Getting It On"	Clinton, Barnes	Standing on the Verge of Getting It On	5:08
5.	"Funky Dollar Bill"	Clinton, Hazel, Davis	Free Your Mind... and Your Ass Will Follow	3:14
6.	"Hit It and Quit It"	Clinton, Nelson	Maggot Brain	3:48
7.	"Cosmic Slop"	Clinton, Worrell	Cosmic Slop	5:17
8.	"Better by the Pound"	Clinton, Hazel	Let's Take It to the Stage	2:41
9.	"Take Your Dead Ass Home"	Clinton, Goins, Shider, Worrell	Tales of Kidd Funkadelic	7:16
10.	"Loose Booty"	Clinton, Beane	America Eats Its Young	4:52
11.	"Get Off Your Ass and Jam"	Clinton	Let's Take It to the Stage	2:24
12.	"Sexy Ways"	Clinton, Hazel	Standing on the Verge of Getting It On	3:04
13.	"Music for My Mother"	Clinton, Hazel, Nelson	Funkadelic	5:37
14.	"America Eats Its Young"	Clinton, Worrell, Beane	America Eats Its Young	5:52
15.	"March to the Witch's Castle"	Clinton	Cosmic Slop	6:01
Total length:				71:45

Disc two
No.	Title	Writer(s)	Original album	Length
1.	"Maggot Brain"	Hazel, Clinton	Maggot Brain	10:18
2.	"I'll Stay"	Clinton, Hazel	Standing on the Verge of Getting It On	7:17
3.	"I Wanna Know If It's Good to You"	Clinton, Haskins, Hazel, Nelson	Free Your Mind... and Your Ass Will Follow	5:59
4.	"Can You Get to That"	Clinton, Harris	Maggot Brain	2:48
5.	"I'll Bet You"	Clinton, Barnes, Lindsey	Funkadelic	3:55
6.	"Nappy Dugout"	Clinton, Shider, Mosson	Cosmic Slop	4:33
7.	"A Joyful Process"	Clinton, Worrell	America Eats Its Young	6:13
8.	"Be My Beach"	Clinton, Collins, Worrell	Let's Take It to the Stage	2:36
9.	"Undisco Kidd"	Clinton, Collins, Worrell	Tales of Kidd Funkadelic	6:34
10.	"Biological Speculation"	Clinton, Harris	America Eats Its Young	3:06
11.	"You and Your Folks, Me and My Folks"	Clinton, Worrell, Jones	Maggot Brain	3:35
12.	"I Got a Thing, You Got a Thing, Everybody's Got a Thing"	Haskins	Funkadelic	3:52
13.	"Baby I Owe You Something Good"	Clinton	Let's Take It to the Stage	5:46
14.	"Mommy, What's a Funkadelic?"	Clinton	Funkadelic	9:06
Total length:				75:38 147:23
