= Get Off Your Ass and Jam =

1975 song by Funkadelic

Song by Funkadelic

from the album Let's Take It to the Stage
- Recorded: 1975
- Genre: Funk rock
- Length: 2:00
- Label: Westbound
- Songwriter: George Clinton
- Producer: George Clinton

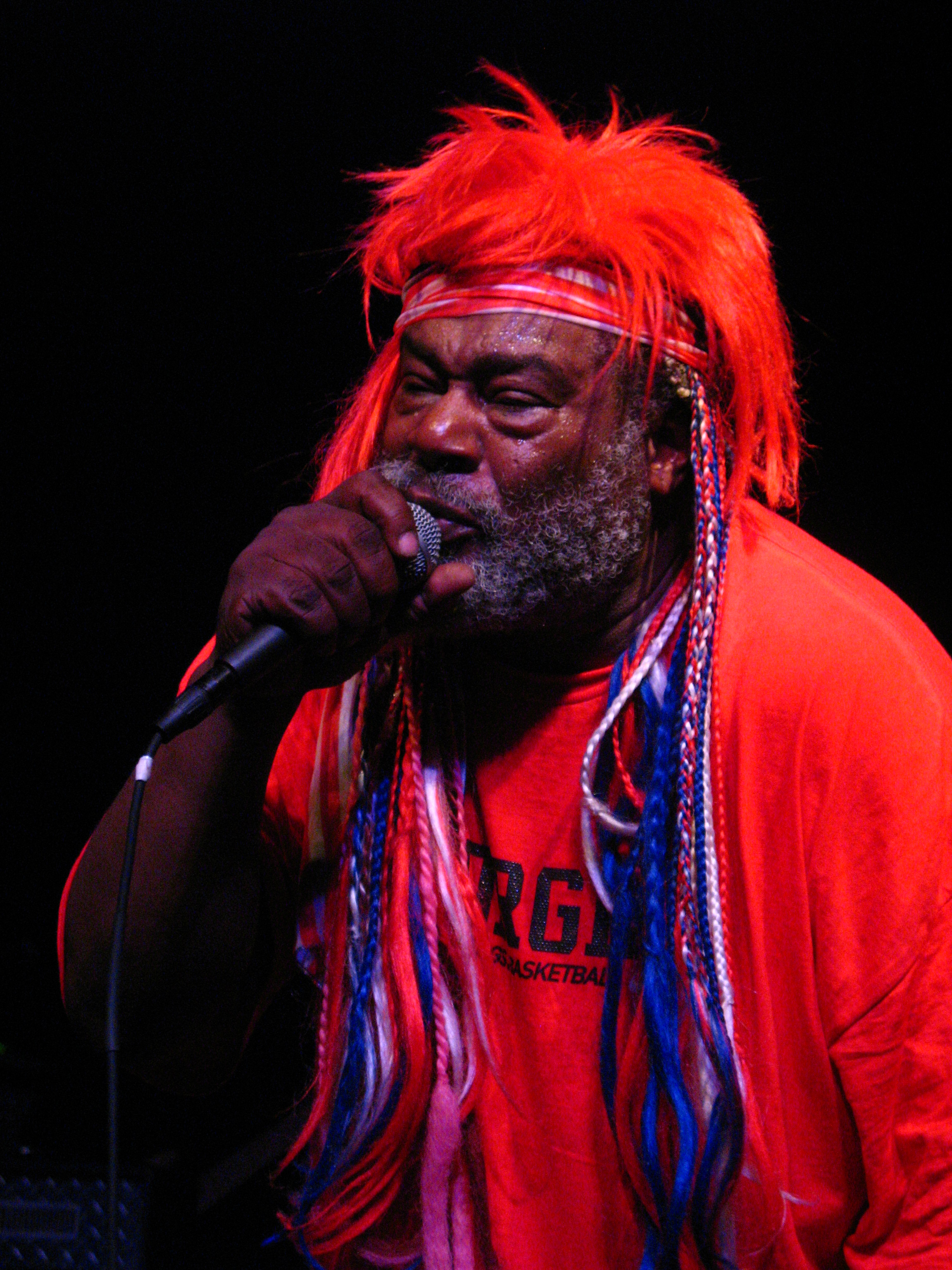
George Clinton, who wrote the song in 1975

"Get Off Your Ass and Jam" is a song by Funkadelic and the sixth track on their seventh studio album Let's Take It to the Stage (1975). It was written by George Clinton, although the lyrics are made up entirely of repetitions of the phrase, "Shit! Goddamn! Get off your ass and jam!" interspersed with lengthy guitar solos. Critic Ned Raggett reviewed the song as one that "kicks in with one bad-ass drum roll and then scorches the damn place down".

== Guitar solo ==
The guitar solo on "Get Off Your Ass and Jam" is uncredited, a practice that was typical of Funkadelic records of the 1970s. In several interviews and in his 2014 autobiography, Brothas Be, Yo Like George, Ain't That Funkin' Kinda Hard on You?, Clinton has said that the guitarist is unknown:

We finished one take, took a smoke break or something, and noticed that a white kid had wandered into the studio, a smack addict. We didn't know him at all, but he said he played a little guitar, and he wanted to know if he could play with us and pick up a little cash in the process. We set him up, started the track, and he just started to play like he was possessed. He did all the rock 'n' roll that hadn't been heard for a few years, and he did it for the entirety of the track. Even when the song ended, he didn't stop. All of us were up there goggle-eyed, saying, "Damn." We had agreed on 25 bucks, but I gave him 50 because I loved it.

According to Clinton, he tried to find the guitarist without success. "I tried to find the guy and put him on another song, but he was gone. He never resurfaced. We never heard from him. He's not credited on the record because we have no idea who he was."

In a July 2009 interview with Vintage Guitar, guitarist Paul Warren, who grew up in the Detroit area and had been a session guitarist for Motown Records, is quoted as saying that he played the solo on "Get Off Your Ass and Jam". Warren makes the same assertion on his website, The Paul Warren Project.

== Sampling ==
The song has been sampled extensively by hip-hop artists. It was one of the two songs at the heart of Bridgeport Music, Inc. v. Dimension Films, in which the copyright in the song was held to be infringed when N.W.A sampled a two-second guitar chord from the beginning of the Funkadelic tune, lowered the pitch and looped it five times in their song, "100 Miles and Runnin'". Other artists who have sampled the song include:

- Public Enemy, in "Bring the Noise", from their 1987 album, It Takes a Nation of Millions to Hold Us Back.
- Eazy-E, in "Eazy-Duz-It", from his 1988 album Eazy-Duz-It.
- Tone Loc, in "Funky Cold Medina" (written by Young MC) from Loc's 1989 debut album, Lōc-ed After Dark.
- A Tribe Called Quest, in "Rhythm (Devoted to the Art of Moving Butts)", from their 1990 debut album, People's Instinctive Travels and the Paths of Rhythm, and in "The Pressure", from their 1996 album Beats, Rhymes and Life.
- Ultramagnetic MCs, in "Make It Happen" from their 1992 album Funk Your Head Up.
- Tupac Shakur, in "Holla If Ya Hear Me", from his 1993 album Strictly 4 My N.I.G.G.A.Z...
- Ice-T, in "99 Problems", from his 1993 album Home Invasion.
- Kokane, in "Shit, Goddamm", from his 1994 album Funk Upon a Rhyme.
- Primal Scream, in "Kowalski", from their 1997 album Vanishing Point.

== Cover versions and other references ==
The song later appeared on Funkadelic's Motor City Madness, released in the United States in 2006. In 1988, Miami Bass rapper Anquette recorded a cover of the song, with the addition of her own rap lyrics, on her second album Respect.

Cornel West referenced the song in prose, quoting the lyrics in describing a "disco party" in his 1982 essay "Epilogue: Sing a Song". Music historian Arthur Kempton similarly notes that the band was "known to make some parents and alumni draw back and exclaim, 'Oh my God,' when from the stage they would incite a rapt crowd of young degree candidates to chant in full-throated unison, "Shit! Goddamn! Get off your ass and jam!"

This song is also referenced in the Rocky Horror Picture Show audience participation script, right after the time warp ends: "Shit! Goddamn it! Sit on my face and slam it, Janet!"
