= Tales of Kidd Funkadelic =

Studio album by Funkadelic
- Released: September 21, 1976
- Genre: Funk
- Length: 39:51
- Label: Westbound
- Producer: George Clinton

Funkadelic chronology
Let's Take It to the Stage (1975)	Tales of Kidd Funkadelic (1976)	Hardcore Jollies (1976)

Singles from Tales of Kidd Funkadelic
- 1. "Undisco Kidd" Released: 1976

Professional ratings
Review scores
Source	Rating
AllMusic	3/5 stars
Blender	3/5 stars
Christgau's Record Guide	B+
Rolling Stone	favorable (1976) (2004)

Tales of Kidd Funkadelic is the eighth studio album by the band Funkadelic, released in September 1976. It was their final album on the Westbound record label. The tracks were recorded during the same sessions as their first release for Warner Bros. Records, Hardcore Jollies; which was released a month later. Two tracks from Tales of Kidd Funkadelic, the single “Undisco Kidd” and the party anthem “Take Your Dead Ass Home!” have been staples in the band’s live performances since the album’s 1976 release, and can be heard on the 1977 Parliament concert album Live: P-Funk Earth Tour. The album opener “Butt-To-Buttresuscitation” and the song “I’m Never Gonna Tell It” were included in the band’s live shows during the early 2000s. The song "Let's Take It to the People" has been sampled by hip-hop band A Tribe Called Quest for their song "Everything Is Fair", on their album The Low End Theory.

Kidd Funkadelic was/is the nickname for guitarist Michael Hampton.

== Track listing ==
Side one
No.	Title	Writer(s)	Length
1.	"Butt-to-Butresuscitation"	George Clinton, Eddie Hazel, Bernie Worrell, Michael Hampton	3:53
2.	"Let's Take It to the People"	Clinton, Hazel, Garry Shider	1:50
3.	"Undisco Kidd" (released as a single-Westbound 5029)	Clinton, Bootsy Collins, Worrell	6:34
4.	"Take Your Dead Ass Home! (Say Som'n Nasty)"	Clinton, Glenn Goins, Shider, Worrell	7:18
Total length:			19:35

Side two
No.	Title	Writer(s)	Length
5.	"I'm Never Gonna Tell It"	Clinton, Worrell	3:41
6.	"Tales of Kidd Funkadelic (Opusdelite Years)"	Clinton, Worrell	12:56
7.	"How Do Yeaw View You?" (released as the B-side to "Undisco Kidd")	Clinton, Collins, Worrell	3:39
Total length:			20:16 39:51

== Funkadelic Main Invasion Force (Personnel) ==
- Guitars: Michael Hampton, Garry Shider, Glenn Goins
- Keyboards, Synthesizers: Bernie Worrell
- Bass: Cordell "Boogie" Mosson
- Drums: Jerome "Bigfoot" Brailey
- Percussion: Calvin Simon
- Vocals: George Clinton, Ray Davis, Glen Goins, Clarence "Fuzzy" Haskins, Calvin Simon, Garry Shider, Grady Thomas
- Maggotusi Vocal Choir (Backup Vocals): Jessica Cleaves, Cynthia Davis, Donna Davis, Debbie Edwards, Taka Kahn, Pamela Vincent, Debbie Wright, Gary “Mudbone” Cooper

== Spastic Funkadelic Alumni ==
- Eddie Hazel: Guitar
- Billy "Bass" Nelson: Bass guitar
- William "Bootsy" Collins: Bass guitar
- Ron Bykowski: Lead guitar
