= Let's Take It to the Stage =

1975 album by Funkadelic

Studio album by Funkadelic
- Released: April 21, 1975
- Genre: Funk rock
- Length: 35:57
- Label: Westbound
- Producer: George Clinton

Funkadelic chronology
Standing on the Verge of Getting It On (1974)	Let's Take It to the Stage (1975)	Tales of Kidd Funkadelic (1976)

Singles from Let's Take It to the Stage
- 1. "Get Off Your Ass and Jam" Released: 1975; 2. "Better by the Pound" Released: 1975; 3. "Let's Take It to the Stage" Released: 1976

Let's Take It to the Stage is the seventh album by American funk rock band Funkadelic. It was released on April 21, 1975 on Westbound Records. The album charted at number 102 on the Billboard 200 and number 14 on the R&B Albums.

== Music and lyrics ==
Let's Take It to the Stage is a funk rock album. The opening track, "Good to Your Earhole", features extensive guitar parts and a pronounced funk groove played by the rhythm section. According to Funkadelic bandleader George Clinton, the guitar solo for "Get Off Your Ass and Jam" was performed by "a smack addict" guitar player who had found his way into the studio. He asked Clinton if he could play for some cash and proceeded to play "like he was possessed", soloing over the entire duration of the song. He received $50 for his efforts without Clinton ever learning his name. In a July 2009 interview with Vintage Guitar, guitarist Paul Warren said that he played the solo.

The closing track "Atmosphere", which begins with a monologue by Clinton about "dicks and clits", appropriates an extended organ coda from Johann Sebastian Bach. "Get Off Your Ass and Jam" has been sampled on several hip hop hits, including Brand Nubian's "Slow Down", Public Enemy's "Bring the Noise", and N.W.A's "100 Miles and Runnin'".

== Critical reception ==
Professional ratings
Review scores
Source	Rating
AllMusic	3.5/5 stars
Blender	5/5 stars
Christgau's Record Guide	A–
The Encyclopedia of Popular Music	4/5 stars
The Rolling Stone Album Guide	4/5 stars
Spin Alternative Record Guide	9/10
The Village Voice	B+

Reviewing the album in 1975, Billboard called it a collection of Funkadelic's "usual good mix of soul and jazz sounds, mixed in with singing and street raps", citing the title track and "Baby I Owe You Something Good" as highlights. In The Village Voice, Robert Christgau said Funkadelic finally does on record "what they've always promised to do in the hype—make the Ohio Players sound like the Mike Curb Congregation." Years later, he wrote in Christgau's Record Guide: Rock Albums of the Seventies (1981) that, despite the group's "disturbingly occultish bent", the music is "tough-minded, outlandish, very danceable, and finally, I think (and hope), liberating"; for Blender, he said it is their "tightest album ... all 10 tracks rock on."

In a retrospective review, AllMusic's Ned Raggett found Let's Take It to the Stage to be one of the band's most comical records with "more P-Funk all-time greats as well, making for a grand balance of the serious and silly." Sasha Frere-Jones, writing in The Rolling Stone Album Guide (2004), said it was "a summing-up of everything Funkadelic had done to date, and is still their most playable record." He felt that, although Clinton's "sexual politics weren't at their best" on tracks such as "No Head No Backstage Pass", the album is exemplary of the band's musicianship.

== Track listing ==
Side one
No.	Title	Writer(s)	Length
1.	"Good to Your Earhole"	George Clinton, Grace Cook, Fuzzy Haskins	4:30
2.	"Better by the Pound" (released as a single-Westbound 5014)	Clinton, Cook	2:40
3.	"Be My Beach"	Clinton, Bootsy Collins, Bernie Worrell	2:35
4.	"No Head, No Backstage Pass"	Clinton, Ron Bykowski	2:36
5.	"Let's Take It to the Stage" (released as a single-Westbound 5026)	Clinton, Collins, Garry Shider	3:32
6.	"Get Off Your Ass and Jam"	Clinton	2:00
Total length:			17:53

Side two
No.	Title	Writer(s)	Length
7.	"Baby I Owe You Something Good"	Clinton	5:43
8.	"Stuffs and Things" (released as the B-side of "Better by the Pound")	Clinton, Cook	2:11
9.	"The Song Is Familiar"	Clinton, Collins, Worrell	3:05
10.	"Atmosphere"	Clinton, Shider, Worrell	7:05
Total length:			18:04 35:57

== Personnel ==
- Vocals: 'Cool' Cal Simon, 'Bad Bosco' Bernie Worrell, C 'Boogie' Mosson, Garry 'Dowop' Shider
- Bass Vocals: 'Sting' Ray Davis
- Genie Vocals: 'Shady' Grady Thomas
- Werewolf Vocals: Clarence "Fuzzy" Haskins
- Maggot Overlord: George Clinton
- Congas: Calvin Simon
- Keyboards: Bernie Worrell
- Bass: C Boogie Mosson
- Percussion: R Tiki Fulwood
- Guitar: Michael Hampton, Garry Shider
- Alumni Funkadelic: Bootsy Collins (vocals), Billy Bass, Eddie Hazel, Ron Bykowski
- Guest Funkadelic: Paul Warren, Reggie McBride, Frosty [Barry Frost, drummer for Rare Earth], Mello Garcia, Honeys, Denise Hurd, Delores whats-her-name, Gary "Mudbone" Cooper, Parliament l, Mallia Franklin- uncredited

== Bibliography ==
- Christgau, Robert (October 13, 1981). Christgau's Record Guide: Rock Albums of the Seventies. Ticknor & Fields. ISBN 0899190251.
- DeCurtis, Anthony; Henke, James; George-Warren, Holly (1992). The Rolling Stone Album Guide (3rd ed.). Random House. ISBN 0679737294. "If ever an album deserved to be called ahead of its time, this catchy and challenging funk-rock raveup definitely qualifies."
- Frere-Jones, Sasha; et al. (2004). Brackett, Nathan; Hoard, Christian (eds.). The New Rolling Stone Album Guide (4th ed.). Simon & Schuster. ISBN 0-7432-0169-8.
