= Funkadelic (album) =

Studio album by Funkadelic
- Released: February 24, 1970
- Recorded: 1968–69
- Studios: Tera Shirma Sound, Detroit, Michigan
- Genres: Acid rock; psychedelic funk; soul; psychedelic soul
- Length: 46:37
- Label: Westbound
- Producer: George Clinton

Funkadelic chronology
| Funkadelic (1970) | Free Your Mind... and Your Ass Will Follow (1970) |

Singles from Funkadelic
- 1. "Music for My Mother" Released: 1969; 2. "I'll Bet You" Released: 1970; 3. "I Got a Thing, You Got a Thing, Everybody's Got a Thing" Released: 1970

Funkadelic is the debut studio album by the American funk rock band Funkadelic, released in 1970 on Westbound Records.

== Background ==
The group that would become Funkadelic was formed by George Clinton in 1964, as the unnamed backing section for his doo wop group the Parliaments. Funkadelic signed to Westbound in 1968. Around this time, the group's music evolved from soul and doo wop into a harder guitar-driven mix of psychedelic rock, soul and funk, much influenced by the popular musical (and political) movements of the time. Jimi Hendrix, Sly Stone, MC5, and Vanilla Fudge were major inspirations. The band made their first live television performance on Say Brother on October 7, 1969. They played a jam with songs "Into My Own Thing" (a Sly Stone cover), "What Is Soul?", "(I Wanna) Testify", "I Was Made to Love Her" (a Stevie Wonder cover), "Friday Night, August 14th" and "Music for My Mother".

On the group's self-titled debut, the credits listed organist Mickey Atkins plus Clinton, Tiki Fulwood, Eddie Hazel, Billy "Bass" Nelson, and Tawl Ross. The recording also included the rest of the Parliaments singers (still uncredited because of contractual concerns), several uncredited members of Motown's in-house studio band The Funk Brothers, as well as Ray Monette (of Rare Earth).

== Reception and legacy ==
Professional ratings
Retrospective reviews
Review scores
| Source | Rating |
|---|---|
| AllMusic | 4.5/5 stars |
| Blender | 3/5 stars |
| Pitchfork | 9.0/10 |
| The Rolling Stone Album Guide | 3.5/5 stars |
| Spin Alternative Record Guide | 9/10 |

In conjunction with the release of Funkadelic, Westbound Records circulated a promotional single called "Focus on Funkadelic" to radio stations. The single features six snippets of tracks from the LP.

According to critic Robert Christgau, Funkadelic's "dark, slow, tuneless" music was originally panned and "scared the bejesus out of fans of upful blackness on both sides of America's widening racial divide". Writing in Christgau's Record Guide: Rock Albums of the Seventies (1981), Christgau jokingly referred to Clinton as "someone from Carolina who encountered eternity on LSD and vowed to contain it in a groove." Years later, Christgau rated the album as "a prequel to Sly and the Family Stone's depressive There's a Riot Goin' On". Mojo later hailed Funkadelic as "the best blues-influenced, warped acid rock you're likely to hear", and The Mojo Collection (2007) called it the band's first album of "spaced-out psychedelic funk". AllMusic's Jason Birchmeier said the recordings are "essentially conventional soul songs in the spirit of Motown or Stax -- steady rhythms, dense arrangements, choruses of vocals -- but with a loud, overdriven, fuzzy guitar lurking high in the mix". He deemed the album "a revealing and unique record that's certainly not short on significance, clearly marking the crossroads between '60s soul and '70s funk".

"I'll Bet You" was later covered by the Jackson 5 on their album ABC, and sampled by the Beastie Boys for their song "Car Thief". The 2005 CD reissue also contains their version of "Can't Shake It Loose", which was recorded two years prior by Diana Ross & the Supremes on their album Love Child. In more recent years, the Red Hot Chili Peppers have combined the main riff of "Mommy, What's a Funkadelic?" and certain parts of the lyrics from "What Is Soul?" in live shows, a version which appears as a B-Side on their 2002 single "By the Way".

== Singles ==
"I'll Bet You" got to No. 22 on the US Billboard Hot Soul Songs chart. "I Got a Thing, You Got a Thing, Everybody's Got a Thing" reached No. 30 on the US Billboard Hot Soul Songs chart.

== Track listing ==
Side One
| No. | Title | Writer(s) | Length |
|---|---|---|---|
| 1. | "Mommy, What's a Funkadelic?" | George Clinton | 9:04 |
| 2. | "I'll Bet You" | George Clinton, Sidney Barnes, Theresa Lindsey | 6:10 |
| 3. | "Music for My Mother" | George Clinton, Edward Hazel, William Nelson | 5:37 |
| 4. | "I Got a Thing, You Got a Thing, Everybody's Got a Thing" | Clarence Haskins | 3:52 |
| Total length: | | | 24:43 |

Side Two
| No. | Title | Writer(s) | Length |
|---|---|---|---|
| 5. | "Good Old Music" | George Clinton | 7:59 |
| 6. | "Qualify and Satisfy" | George Clinton, Edward Hazel | 6:15 |
| 7. | "What Is Soul" | George Clinton | 7:40 |
| Total length: | | | 21:54 46:37 |

2005 CD reissue bonus tracks (Alternate 45 versions and non-album b-sides)
| No. | Title | Writer(s) | Length |
|---|---|---|---|
| 8. | "Can't Shake It Loose" (recorded in 1969 and scheduled as Westbound W 149) | George Clinton, Sidney Barnes, Joanne Jackson, Rose Marie McCoy | 2:28 |
| 9. | "I Bet You" (Westbound W 150) | George Clinton, Sidney Barnes, Theresa Lindsey | 4:10 |
| 10. | "Music for My Mother" (Westbound W 148) | George Clinton, Edward Hazel, William Nelson | 5:17 |
| 11. | "As Good as I Can Feel" (recorded in 1969 and scheduled as Westbound W 149 (instrumental)) | George Clinton, Clarence Haskins | 2:31 |
| 12. | "Open Our Eyes" (Westbound W 150) | Leon Lumpkins | 3:58 |
| 13. | "Qualify and Satisfy" (45 version – Westbound W 150) | George Clinton, Edward Hazel | 3:00 |
| 14. | "Music for My Mother" (Instrumental 45 version – Westbound W 149) | George Clinton, Edward Hazel, William Nelson | 6:14 |
| Total length: | | | 27:38 1:14:15 |

== Personnel ==
=== Funkadelic ===
- Eddie Hazel – lead guitar, backing vocals on "Mommy, What's A Funkadelic?"; vocals on "I Bet You" & "Can't Shake It Loose", all Lead Vocals on "Open Our Eyes"; bridge vocals on "I Got a Thing"
- Lucius "Tawl" Ross – rhythm guitar
- Ramon "Tiki" Fulwood – drums on (1, 2, 4, 5, 6, 7, 9,11,13)
- Billy "Bass" Nelson – bass guitar on (1, 3, 4, 5, 6, 7); backing vocals; lead vocals on "Good Old Music"
- Mickey Atkins – Hammond organ on (5, 6, 7)

=== The Parliaments ===
- George Clinton – lead vocals on "Mommy, What's A Funkadelic?" & "What is Soul", vocal on "Can't Shake It Loose"
- Clarence "Fuzzy" Haskins – vocals on "I Bet You" and "Good Old Music"
- Calvin Simon – lead vocals on "Qualify and Satisfy"; vocals on "I Bet You" and "Can't Shake It Loose"
- Ray Davis – vocals on "I Bet You"
- Grady Thomas – vocals on "I Bet You"

=== Additional musicians ===
- Ray Monette – guitar on (2, 4, 9)
- Dennis Coffey – guitar
- Bob Babbitt – bass guitar on (2, 9)
- Bernie Worrell – Hammond organ on (4)
- Earl Van Dyke – Hammond organ on (2, 9)
- Brad Innis – drums on (3)
- Gasper Lawal – conga on (3)
- Herb Sparkman – lead vocals on "Music for My Mother"
- Hot Buttered Soul – additional backing vocals

=== Production ===
- Produced by George Clinton
- Engineering by Milan Bogden, Russ Terrana, Ed Wolfrum, Bryan Dombrowski
- The Graffiteria – artwork

== Charts ==
| Year | Charts | Peak position |
|---|---|---|
| 1971 | US Billboard Soul Albums | 8 |
| 1971 | US Billboard 200 | 126 |
