= Standing on the Verge of Getting It On =

Studio album by Funkadelic
- Released: July 10, 1974
- Genres: Funk, funk rock, psychedelic rock
- Length: 37:43
- Label: Westbound
- Producer: George Clinton

Funkadelic chronology
Cosmic Slop (1973)	Standing on the Verge of Getting It On (1974)	Let's Take It to the Stage (1975)

Singles from Standing on the Verge of Getting It On
- 1. "Standing on the Verge of Getting It On" Released: 1974; 2. "Red Hot Mama" Released: 1975

Professional ratings
Review scores
Source	Rating
AllMusic	4/5 stars
Blender	3/5 stars
Christgau's Record Guide	B+
Rolling Stone	favorable (1975) (2004)
Spin Alternative Record Guide	9/10{
Sputnikmusic	3/5 stars

Standing on the Verge of Getting It On is the sixth studio album by Funkadelic, released on Westbound Records, released in July 1974. It is notable for featuring the return of guitarist Eddie Hazel.

On this album, the lyrics generally take a backseat to the music and the jamming. It is one of the most popular Funkadelic albums among fans, and highlights the virtuosic guitar of the returning Eddie Hazel, who had departed following 1971's Maggot Brain. Hazel co-wrote all of the album's songs, although the songwriting credits were mostly in the name of Grace Cook, Hazel's mother (a gambit by Hazel to avoid contractual difficulties with the publishing rights).

Ned Raggett writes in AllMusic that "Jimmy's Got a Little Bit of Bitch in Him" is a "friendly" song about "a gay friend" and notes that this stands in contrast with later negative attitudes towards homosexuality among hip-hop artists who often sampled P-Funk songs.

== Track listing ==
Side One
No.	Title	Written by	Length
1.	"Red Hot Mama"	Bernie Worrell, George Clinton, Eddie Hazel	4:54
2.	"Alice in My Fantasies"	Clinton, Hazel	2:26
3.	"I'll Stay"	Clinton, Hazel	7:18
4.	"Sexy Ways"	Clinton, Hazel	3:05
Total length:			17:43

Side Two
No.	Title	Written by	Length
5.	"Standing on the Verge of Getting It On"	Clinton, Hazel	5:07
6.	"Jimmy's Got a Little Bit of Bitch in Him"	Clinton, Hazel	2:23
7.	"Good Thoughts, Bad Thoughts"	Clinton, Hazel	12:30
Total length:			20:00 37:43

Note: on songs 2–7, Eddie Hazel's songwriting credit was in the name of his mother, Grace Cook.

== Personnel ==
(all the below is from the liner notes)

- Spaced Viking; Keyboards & Vocals: Bernie Worrell
- Tenor Vocals, Congas and Suave Personality: Calvin Simon
- A Prototype Werewolf; Berserker Octave Vocals: Fuzzy Haskins
- World's Only Black Leprechaun; Bass & Vocals: Boogie Mosson
- Maggoteer Lead/Solo Guitar & Vocals: Eddie “Smedley Smorganoff” Hazel
- Rhythm/Lead Guitar, Doowop Vocals, Sinister Grin: Garry Shider
- Supreme Maggot Minister of Funkadelia; Vocals, Maniac Froth and Spit; Behaviour Illegal In Several States: George Clinton
- Percussion & Vocals; Equipped with stereo armpits: Tiki Fulwood
- Rhythm/Lead Guitar; polyester soul-powered token white devil: Ron Bykowski
- Registered and Licensed Genie; Vocals: “Shady” Grady Thomas
- Subterranean Bass Vocals, Supercool and Stinky Fingers: Ray (Stingray) Davis
- Drums: Gary Bronson
- Bass: Jimi Calhoun
- Piano: Leon Patillo
- Percussion: Ty Lampkin

== Song information ==
=== “Red Hot Momma” ===
This song is a remake of a song by Parliament while the band was signed to Invictus Records. The title of this song has been spelt in three different ways on various Parliaments, Funkadelic, and Parliament releases that have featured a version of the song, with the final word being spelled as "Mama," "Mamma," or "Momma."

The guitar solo and jam that conclude this song were continued in the studio, and ended up as a B-side titled "Vital Juices," featuring guitar work by Eddie Hazel and Ron Bykowski. That track is found on Westbound compilation CD Music For Your Mother: Funkadelic 45s as well as the recent CD reissue of the original album.

- Lead Vocals: George Clinton & Eddie Hazel
- Lead Guitars and Solos: Eddie Hazel & Ron Bykowski

== Charts ==
Album

Billboard (North America)

Year	Chart	Position
1974	Pop Albums	163
1974	R&B Albums	13
