= Barbara Cheeseborough =

American model

- Born: Barbara Bowman; March 14, 1946; Philadelphia, Pennsylvania, U.S.
- Died: October 24, 2013 (aged 67)
- Occupation: Fashion model
- Spouse: William Edward Cheeseborough

Barbara Cheeseborough (née Bowman) (March 14, 1946 – October 24, 2013) was an American fashion model of the 1960s and 1970s, known for promoting an Afrocentric style.

== Biography ==
Cheeseborough was born March 14, 1946, in Philadelphia. After her marriage to William Edward Cheeseborough, a fashion photographer, she moved to New York City to begin a career in fashion modeling. Her career spanned 20+ years and she appeared in Essence, Bazaar, Redbook, Vogue and Cosmopolitan magazines.

She famously appeared on the cover of the first issue of Essence Magazine in 1970. Her appearance on the cover of Essence was described by NPR (National Public Radio) of as "the first to show an Afrocentric beauty standard when millions of young women were casting about for a kind of beauty they could identify with and replicate." Cheeseborough also appeared on the 1970 debut album of the band Funkadelic, as well as the iconic cover of their third release Maggot Brain in 1971.

Cheeseborough died on October 24, 2013, of colon cancer at the age of 67.
