= Free Your Mind... and Your Ass Will Follow =

Studio album by Funkadelic
- Released: July 20, 1970
- Recorded: 1970
- Studios: Audio Graphic Services, United Sound, and G-M (Detroit)
- Genres: Psychedelic rock; acid rock; funk; psychedelic soul; space rock
- Length: 30:52
- Label: Westbound
- Producer: George Clinton

Funkadelic chronology
Funkadelic (1970)	Free Your Mind... and Your Ass Will Follow (1970)	Maggot Brain (1971)

Singles from Free Your Mind... and Your Ass Will Follow
- 1. "I Wanna Know If It's Good to You?" Released: December 1970

Free Your Mind... and Your Ass Will Follow is the second studio album by the American funk rock band Funkadelic, released on July 20, 1970, by Westbound Records. It charted at No. 92 in the US, making it the band's highest-charting album release until 1978's One Nation Under a Groove, and included the No. 82 single "I Wanna Know If It's Good to You?"

== Background ==
The album was recorded at United Sound Studios, Audio Graphic Services, and G-M Recording Studios in Detroit. George Clinton described the recording as an attempt to "see if we can cut a whole album while we're all tripping on acid."

The album's gatefold cover forms something of a visual pun, echoing the sentiments of the album title. The woman holding her arms towards heaven in an ecstatic pose is found to be nude upon opening the sleeve.

The original 1970 issue's artwork featured the woman facing downward, and the "Free Your Mind..." title in brown. Reissues beginning in 1990 reversed the woman's direction (substituting an alternate photograph where her head is more inclined and her fingers are more widely fanned), and have varied the placement and color of the text.

In 2026, the album was remastered and reissued by Org Music on vinyl, CD, cassette, and digital (streaming) formats.

== Music and lyrics ==
The album and its title track, a feedback-drenched number taking a third of the album's length, introduces the subversion of Christian themes explored on later songs, describing a mystical approach to salvation in which "the Kingdom of Heaven is within" and achievable through freeing one's mind, after which one's "ass" will follow. Many of the songs, such as the title track and "Eulogy and Light", subvert Christian themes (including the Lord's Prayer and the 23rd Psalm) and satirize capitalism.

== Reception ==
Professional ratings
Review scores
Source	Rating
AllMusic	4/5 stars
Blender	2/5 stars
Christgau's Record Guide	B−
The Encyclopedia of Popular Music	3/5 stars
Pitchfork	8.8/10
Record Collector	5/5 stars
The Rolling Stone Album Guide	3/5 stars

On the Billboard charts (North America), Free Your Mind... and Your Ass Will Follow peaked at No. 11 on the Black Albums Chart and No. 92 on the Pop Albums chart. The album and eponymous song influenced the band En Vogue, leading to the title of their hit song "Free Your Mind" (1992).

In Christgau's Record Guide: Rock Albums of the Seventies (1981), Robert Christgau said the album had contradictory messages that might either promote "escapist idealism or psychic liberation", and a disorienting aesthetic that is most successful on "Funky Dollar Bill". He later wrote that it is not surprising that the album became "a cult fave in slackerland," as "not only is the shit weird, the weirdness signifies."

In a positive review, AllMusic's Ned Raggett felt that both the album and title track are worthy of the title and that the other songs range from "the good to astoundingly great." Record Collector magazine's Paul Rigby called Free Your Mind a "superb" album which mixes "a dirty groove with wacked-out sound effects and razor-sharp lyrics. Pitchfork described it as "a lot more 'rock' and a little less 'soul'" than the band's debut, and compared the title track to "a Sly Stone jam gone haywire, with fuzzed out guitar and bass, distorto-organ, and spoken, chanted or otherwise freaked vox appearing all over the mix." In a retrospective review for Blender, Christgau opined that the album did not live up to the title credo.

== Track listing ==
Side One
No.	Title	Writer(s)	Length
1.	"Free Your Mind and Your Ass Will Follow"	George Clinton, Edward Hazel, Raymond Davis	10:00
2.	"Friday Night, August 14th"	Clinton, William Nelson, Hazel	5:20
Total length:			15:20

Side Two
No.	Title	Writer(s)	Length
3.	"Funky Dollar Bill"	Clinton, Hazel, Davis	3:14
4.	"I Wanna Know If It's Good to You?"	Clinton, Nelson, Clarence Haskins, Davis	5:54
5.	"Some More"	Clinton	2:55
6.	"Eulogy and Light"	Eugene Harris	3:29
Total length:			15:32 30:52

2005 CD reissue bonus tracks
No.	Title	Writer(s)	Length
7.	"Fish, Chips and Sweat" (single a-side Westbound W 158)	Clinton, Nelson, Hazel	3:22
8.	"Free Your Mind Radio Advert"		0:55
9.	"I Wanna Know If It's Good to You" (single a-side Westbound W 167)	Clinton, Haskins, Hazel, Nelson	2:50
10.	"I Wanna Know If It's Good to You" (single b-side instrumental - Westbound W 167)	Clinton, Nelson, Haskins, Davis	3:12
Total length:			10:19 41:11

Notes

- Track 9 is a mono recording.

== Personnel ==
Credits are adapted from Muze.

Funkadelic

- George Clinton – lead vocals (1, 5, 6)
- Ray Davis – vocals
- Fuzzy Haskins – vocals, lead vocals (7)
- Calvin Simon – vocals
- Grady Thomas – vocals
- Eddie Hazel – guitar, lead vocals (2, 4, 5, 7), backwards vocals (6)
- Tawl Ross – guitar, lead vocals (3)
- Bernie Worrell – Hammond organ, Vox organ, piano
- Billy Nelson – bass guitar, lead vocals (2, 4)
- Tiki Fulwood – drums

Martha Reeves appeared on this project but was not credited. Telma Hopkins and Joyce Vincent (Dawn) appear on "Friday Night, August 14th".

Production

- Produced by George Clinton
- Engineering by Ed Wolfrum, Milan Bogdan
- Art direction by David Krieger
- Photography by Joel Brodsky
- Album design – The Graffiteria, Stanley Hochstadt
- Album co-ordination – Dorothy Schwartz
- Production supervision – Bob Scerbo
- Executive producer – Armen Boladian
- Orga Dorga Services – Bernie Mendelson
