= Hardcore Jollies =

Studio album by Funkadelic
- Released: October 29, 1976
- Recorded: 1976
- Genre: Funk
- Length: 40:16
- Label: Warner Bros.
- Producer: George Clinton

Funkadelic chronology
Tales of Kidd Funkadelic (1976)	Hardcore Jollies (1976)	One Nation Under a Groove (1978)

Singles from Hardcore Jollies
- 1. "Comin' Round the Mountain"" Released: 1977; 2. "Smokey" Released: 1977

Professional ratings
Review scores
Source	Rating
AllMusic	4/5 stars
Blender	4/5 stars
Christgau's Record Guide	A–
Rolling Stone	3/5 stars

Hardcore Jollies is the ninth studio album by the funk rock band Funkadelic, released on October 29, 1976 by Warner Bros. Records, their first album to be issued on a major label. It is dedicated to "the guitar players of the world." Originally, the first side of the album was called "Osmosis Phase 1" and the second side was "Terribitus Phase 2." Hardcore Jollies was released one month after Funkadelic's final album for Westbound Records, Tales of Kidd Funkadelic, which was recorded during the same sessions.

Hardcore Jollies was the last Parliament-Funkadelic studio album to include three of the original members of The Parliaments: Fuzzy Haskins, Calvin Simon and Grady Thomas. Though uncredited, Hardcore Jollies features instrumental performances by guitarist Eddie Hazel.

The album has been reissued on compact disc by Charly Groove Records and Priority Records.

== Track listing ==
Osmosis Phase One (Side one)
No.	Title	Writer(s)	Length
1.	"Comin' Round the Mountain" (released as a single-Warner Bros. 8309)	George Clinton, Grace Cook	5:56
2.	"Smokey" (released as a single-Warner Bros. 8367)	Clinton, Garry Shider	6:08
3.	"If You Got Funk, You Got Style" (released as the B-side to "Comin' Round the Mountain")	Clinton, Bootsy Collins, Bernie Worrell	3:07
4.	"Hardcore Jollies"	Clinton, Worrell	5:01
Total length:			20:12

Terribitus Phase Two (Side two)
No.	Title	Writer(s)	Length
5.	"Soul Mate" (released as the B-side to "Smokey")	Clinton, Cook	2:48
6.	"Cosmic Slop"	Clinton, Worrell	6:30
7.	"You Scared the Lovin' Outta Me"	Clinton, Glenn Goins	6:28
8.	"Adolescent Funk"	Clinton, Michael Hampton, Worrell	4:18
Total length:			20:04 40:16

== Personnel ==
- Vocals: George Clinton, Ray Davis, Fuzzy Haskins, Grady Thomas, Calvin Simon, Garry Shider, Glenn Goins, Gary “Mudbone” Cooper
- Lead Guitar: Michael Hampton, Eddie Hazel
- Guitars: Eddie Hazel, Garry Shider, Glenn Goins
- Keyboards: Bernie Worrell
- Bass: Boogie Mosson, Bootsy Collins, Jimi Calhoun on "Comin' Round the Mountain"
- Drums: Jerome Brailey, Buddy Miles on "Comin' Round the Mountain"

This would be the last Funkadelic album to feature Fuzzy Haskins, Calvin Simon, and Grady Thomas. They would leave because of money and other personal issues. This is also the last of the two Funkadelic albums to include Glen Goins; although he would appear on two subsequent Parliament albums.

== Cosmic Slop ==
This track is a live version of the 1973 song from the Funkadelic album of the same name and it was recorded at a rehearsal for the 1976 P-Funk Earth Tour (see Mothership Connection Newberg Session). This version uses a vocal introduction that was removed from the 1973 studio version, and it features prominent guitar solos by Michael Hampton. This version is widely considered to be the best early example of Hampton's guitar work.

== Charts ==
Album

Billboard (North America)

Year	Chart	Position
1976	Pop Albums	96
1976	R&B Albums	12
