= I Don't Even Know =

Studio album by Bernie Worrell
- Released: February 11, 2010
- Genre: Funk
- Label: PurpleWOO Productions, Inc.

Bernie Worrell chronology
Christmas Woo (2009)	I Don't Even Know (2010)	Standards (2011)

I Don't Even Know is the eighth solo album by former Parliament-Funkadelic keyboardist Bernie Worrell. The album was released in 2010 by PurpleWOO Productions, Inc.

== Track listing ==
No.	Title	Length
1.	"First Things First"	4:18
2.	"Tribal Up"	5:20
3.	"Shades Of The Kid"	3:29
4.	"Next"	3:31
5.	"Thug"	2:13
6.	"Refurbish"	3:11
7.	"Tribale"	5:47
8.	"Tree-Fore"	3:32
9.	"One Rabbit"	4:12
10.	"Judicious"	4:07
11.	"Hearin Dis', Playin' Dat"	4:07
12.	"Sunrise"	4:18
13.	"Beef"	3:50
14.	"Once Again (First Things First Reprise)"	4:18
