= Billy Bass Nelson =

American musician (1951–2026)

- Nelson in 1971

Background information
- Also known as: Billy Bass
- Born: William Nelson Jr. January 28, 1951; Plainfield, New Jersey, U.S.
- Died: January 31, 2026 (aged 75)
- Genres: Funk; soul; psychedelic rock; psychedelic soul
- Instruments: Bass guitar; guitar
- Years active: 1968–2026
- Labels: Warner Bros.; Polystar; Casablanca; Westbound; Columbia; Rykodisc

William "Billy Bass" Nelson Jr. (January 28, 1951 – January 31, 2026) was an American musician who was the original bassist for Funkadelic. He is a member of the Rock and Roll Hall of Fame, inducted in 1997 with fifteen other members of Parliament-Funkadelic.

== Life and career ==
William Nelson Jr. was born in Plainfield, New Jersey, on January 28, 1951. As a teenager he worked at George Clinton's barbershop, sweeping the floor and singing and dancing for the customers. Clinton was a member of the doo wop vocal group the Parliaments, who scored a nationwide hit in 1967 with the song "(I Wanna) Testify". Clinton put together a backing band as musical support for a tour and recruited Nelson, who in turn recommended his friend Eddie Hazel. Nelson and Hazel eventually took on bass and lead guitar roles respectively. The backing band was originally unnamed, but Nelson later coined the name "Funkadelic" to reflect the style (funk) and connect it with the then-burgeoning psychedelic music scene.

By 1970, Funkadelic was a full band consisting of Nelson, Hazel, drummer Tiki Fulwood, guitarist Tawl Ross, and keyboardist Mickey Atkins (later replaced by Bernie Worrell). Since 1967 the band had been billed as the musical backing for The Parliaments. Due to legal problems, in the early 1970s Clinton had temporarily lost the rights to the name "The Parliaments" and instead signed the entire ensemble to Westbound Records under the name Funkadelic. Nelson was a prominent contributor to the first three Funkadelic albums, Funkadelic (1970), Free Your Mind... and Your Ass Will Follow (1970), and Maggot Brain (1971).

Nelson left the group in late 1971 after a financial dispute with George Clinton (making Nelson the first Parliament-Funkadelic member to defect over such concerns, foreshadowing a major problem that would haunt Clinton in the late 1970s). In 1975 Nelson and Hazel next performed with The Temptations ("Shakey Ground"). Nelson rejoined Funkadelic briefly in the studio in 1975, playing on the track "Better By the Pound" on the Funkadelic album Let's Take It to the Stage. Nelson later played with The Commodores, Chairmen of the Board, Fishbone, Jermaine Jackson, Parlet, Lionel Richie, Smokey Robinson, and Lenny Williams.

In the 1990s, Nelson enjoyed a surge of name-checking by such legendary bassists as John Norwood Fisher (of Fishbone) and Flea (of the Red Hot Chili Peppers), while his early Funkadelic work was being sampled often by hip hop artists. Joining with some other P-Funk alumni, in 1994 Nelson released the album Out of the Dark under the name O.G. Funk. After 1994, he served in various touring lineups of Parliament-Funkadelic. He also toured with P-Funk spinoff acts the 420 Funk Mob and Sons of Funk.

Guitar Player described Nelson as "the Wynton Marsalis of funk: an opinionated player with strong views about what is and isn't genuinely funky". Nelson pointed to a song like "You and Your Folks, Me and My Folks" from Maggot Brain for an archetypal funk tempo. He mused, "Funk is meant to be played at a very specific tempo. A lot of groups play ... it all too fast. If you want to play that raw, serious funk, you have to slow it down."

On January 26, 2026, George Clinton said that Nelson had died while receiving hospice care, but his family denied this. However, Nelson died on January 31, 2026, three days after his 75th birthday.

In a tribute article shortly after his death, Ultimate Guitar said "Nelson's contribution to funk and rock remains very significant."
