= Standards (Bernie Worrell album) =

Studio album by Bernie Worrell
- Released: Jun. 7, 2011
- Genre: Jazz, funk
- Label: Scufflin'
- Producer: Bernie Worrell and Evan Taylor

Bernie Worrell chronology
I Don't Even Know (2010)	Standards (2011)

Standards is the ninth solo album by former Parliament-Funkadelic keyboardist Bernie Worrell. The album comprised covers of jazz standards, including "Moon River". The album was released in 2011 by Scufflin' Records and was co-produced by Bernie Worrell and Evan Taylor.

== Track listing ==
No.	Title	Writer	Length
1.	"Take the 'A' Train"	Billy Strayhorn	4:18
2.	"Take Five"	Paul Desmond	6:18
3.	"Agua de Beber"	Antônio Carlos Jobim	5:57
4.	"All the Things You Are"	Jerome Kern	5:08
5.	""You're My Thrill" (song)"	Jay Gorney	5:27
6.	"Watermelon Man"	Herbie Hancock	6:17
7.	"Bye Bye Blackbird" (Available only on digital download)	Ray Henderson	4:22
8.	"Killer Joe"	Benny Golson	6:50
9.	"Moon River"	Henry Mancini	5:14

== Personnel ==
- Bernie Worrell – piano, synthesizer, rhodes, organ, clavinet, melodica
- Ronny Drayton – guitar
- Andrew Kimball – guitar
- Smokey Hormel – nylon string guitar, acoustic guitar, baritone guitar
- Kyle Cadena – guitar
- Tim Luntzel – bass
- Melvin Gibbs – bass
- Evan Taylor – drums
- JT Lewis – drums
- Glen Fittin – percussion, vibraphone

Chops Horns

- Darryl Dixon – alto sax
- David Watson – tenor and baritone sax, flute
- Jonathan Arons – trombone
- Freddie Hendrix – trumpet, flugelhorn

=== Additional personnel ===
- Darryl Dixon – horn arrangement
- Bernie Worrell – production
- Evan Taylor – production
- Eric Spring – recording, mixing
- Steve Berson – mastering
- Nina Chiminec – production assistant
- Justin Emter – photography
- Agree R. Geronca – art direction
