= Maggot Brain =

Studio album by Funkadelic
- Released: July 12, 1971
- Recorded: Late 1970–early 1971
- Studios: United Sound Systems, Detroit
- Genres: Psychedelic funk; funk rock; R&B; acid rock; psychedelic soul
- Length: 36:58
- Label: Westbound
- Producer: George Clinton

Funkadelic chronology
Free Your Mind... and Your Ass Will Follow (1970)	Maggot Brain (1971)	America Eats Its Young (1972)

Singles from Maggot Brain
- 1. "You and Your Folks, Me and My Folks" Released: April 1971; 2. "Can You Get to That" Released: September 1971; 3. "Hit It and Quit It" Released: January 1972

Maggot Brain is the third studio album by the American funk rock band Funkadelic, released on July 12, 1971, by Westbound Records. It was produced by bandleader George Clinton and recorded at United Sound Systems in Detroit during late 1970 and early 1971. The album was the final LP recorded by the original Funkadelic lineup; after its release, founding members Tawl Ross (guitar), Billy Nelson (bass), and Tiki Fulwood (drums) left the band for various reasons.

The album charted on the Billboard R&B Top 20. It is perhaps best known for its ten-minute title track, largely consisting of an improvised solo by guitarist Eddie Hazel. In 2009, Pitchfork named it the 17th best album of the 1970s. In 2020, Rolling Stone ranked Maggot Brain the 136th greatest album of all time in its updated list.

== Music and lyrics ==
The album opens with a spoken word monologue by Funkadelic bandleader George Clinton, which refers to "the maggots in the mind of the universe". According to legend, the opening title track was recorded in one take when Clinton, under the influence of LSD, told lead guitarist Eddie Hazel to play as if he had just learned his mother was dead; Clinton instructed him "to picture that day, what he would feel, how he would make sense of his life, how he would take a measure of everything that was inside him and let it out through his guitar". Though several other musicians performed on the track, Clinton de-emphasized them in the final mix so that the focus would be on Hazel. Hazel utilized fuzz and wah effects, inspired by his idol Jimi Hendrix, on the track; Clinton subsequently added delay and other effects during the mixing process, saying: "I Echoplexed it back on itself three or four times. That gave the whole thing an eerie feel, both in the playing and in the sound effects." Critics have described the solo as "lengthy, mind-melting" and "an emotional apocalypse of sound."

The subsequent five tracks have been described as "sour harmony-group meditations heavy with bass, keyboard and class consciousness," with the band exploring a "psychedelic/funk fusion." "Can You Get to That" features Isaac Hayes' backing vocal group Hot Buttered Soul, and contains elements of folk blues and gospel music. "You and Your Folks, Me and My Folks" explores the need for interracial unity and platonic love, and features electronically distorted drums. "Super Stupid" was described by Pitchfork as a "tale of a dumbass junkie set to a tune Black Sabbath would have been proud of." The nine-minute closing track "Wars of Armageddon" has been described as a "freak-out" jam, and makes use of "paranoid, psychedelic sound effects and crowd sounds." Popular music scholar Yuval Taylor described it as "a burning hot prefiguring" of the music that Miles Davis would perform on his 1975 live album Agharta.

== Release ==
=== Title and packaging ===
Reportedly, "Maggot Brain" was the nickname of Hazel. Other sources say the title is a reference to band leader George Clinton finding his brother Robert's "decomposed dead body, skull cracked, in an apartment in Newark, New Jersey."

The cover artwork depicts a screaming black woman's head coming out of the earth; it was photographed by Joel Brodsky and features model Barbara Cheeseborough. The album's liner notes are a polemic on fear provided by the Process Church of the Final Judgement. According to author Rickey Vincent, the organization's alleged association with the Manson Family, along with the album's foreboding themes and striking artwork, lent Funkadelic the image of a "death-worshipping black rock band."

=== Commercial performance and aftermath ===
Westbound Records released Maggot Brain in July 1971. It peaked at number 108 on the Billboard 200 and reached the top 20 of the Billboard R&B album charts, but did not reach the UK Albums Chart.

After the album was released, Funkadelic effectively disbanded. Drummer Tiki Fulwood was fired due to drug use; guitarist Tawl Ross reportedly had a traumatic drug experience after getting into an "acid eating contest, then snorting some raw speed, before completely flipping out", and did not perform with the group again; and bassist Billy Nelson quit over a money dispute with Clinton. Subsequently, only Clinton, Hazel, and keyboardist Bernie Worrell remained from the original Funkadelic lineup.

A 2005 reissue included three bonus tracks, among them an alternate mix of "Maggot Brain" featuring more of the full band.

== Reception ==
=== Initial reviews ===
Reviewing for Rolling Stone in September 1971, Vince Aletti negatively described Maggot Brain as "a shattered, desolate landscape with few pleasures," competently performed but "limited." He was particularly critical of the record's second side, panning it as "dead-end stuff". Village Voice critic Robert Christgau offered qualified praise, calling the title-track "druggy, time-warped super-schlock" and describing "Can You Get to That" as featuring "a rhythm so pronounced and eccentric it could make Berry Gordy twitch to death"; he added that "the funk pervades the rest of the album, but not to the detriment of other peculiarities."

=== Retrospective ===
Professional ratings
Review scores
Source	Rating
AllMusic	5/5 stars
Blender	4/5 stars
Christgau's Record Guide	B+
The Encyclopedia of Popular Music	4/5 stars
MusicHound Rock	4.5/5 stars
Pitchfork	9.4/10 (2005); 10/10 (2020)
The Rolling Stone Album Guide	4/5 stars
Spin Alternative Record Guide	10/10
Tiny Mix Tapes	4.5/5 marks
Uncut	4/5 stars

Writing years later for PopMatters, Yuval Taylor called the album "one of the loudest, darkest, most intense records ever made", and stated that the group "captured the odor of the age, the stench of death and corruption, the weary exhalation of America at its lowest." Dominique Leone of Pitchfork called it "an explosive record, bursting at the seams with exactly the kind of larger than life sound a band called Funkadelic should have made." Dave Segal, from the same publication, revered it as "a monument of psychedelic funk" and "a defining document of Black rock music in the early '70s". Additionally, he called its two bookending tracks "the most evocative expressions of birth and annihilation ever put on record" and suggested that the "soulful funk-rock" tracks in between represent the "hott[est] five-song streak in the Clinton canon". The Greenwood Encyclopedia of Rock History (2006) claimed that Maggot Brain and Funkadelic's previous two albums "created a whole new kind of psychedelic rock with a dance groove". Music historian Bob Gulla hailed it as an "iconoclastic funk-rock" record, featuring the best guitar playing of Hazel's career. Author Matthew Grant describes the album as marking where "the band really hit their stride.

In a retrospective review for Blender, Christgau described the title track as "indelible" and "Wars of Armageddon" as "Funkadelic's most incendiary freak-out ever". Stereogum named it the second best album by the Parliament-Funkadelic collective, and called it "one of the most cathartic R&B albums ever made." John Bush of AllMusic stated that the group "hit its stride with [the] acid-rock extravaganza." Happy Mag named the album among the five best P-Funk releases, describing it as "an absolute freakout of psychedelic funk sounds", but also "perhaps Clinton’s most lyrically sparse album". Fender called the album "an eruption of psychedelic agit-funk that blended the increasingly bleak American story—urban decay, prime time body counts from an ongoing slog through Vietnam, and front page assassinations—with the sounds of Hendrix, Motown, James Brown, Cream, Sly Stone, Blue Cheer and Vanilla Fudge." The Washington Post critic Geoffrey Himes names it an exemplary release of progressive soul.

In 2003, Rolling Stone ranked Maggot Brain #486 on its list of 500 Greatest Albums of All Time, with the magazine raising its rank in 2012 to #479, calling it "the heaviest rock album the P-Funk ever created". In the 2020 reboot of the list, the album's rank increased again to #136. It was also listed in the 2005 book 1001 Albums You Must Hear Before You Die.

== Influence ==
Maggot Brain was also influential to subsequent artists. Vernon Reid of the band Living Colour called the album "a magnum opus of rock 'n' roll." Michael Melchiondo (Dean Ween) of Ween has said: "When I heard 'Maggot Brain,' it was like, [...] there's this whole other thing, and it's even better, and there's more of it. And I can go see it live, and there's nine guitar players that are this good. So that was the hugest, hugest deal." Melchiondo paid tribute to Eddie Hazel on the track "A Tear for Eddie" from Ween's 1994 album Chocolate and Cheese. The Mars Volta's 2006 Amputechture album features a "Maggot Brain"-inspired guitar solo on the song "Vicarious Atonement". Jazz musician Angel Bat Dawid also drew influence from Funkadelic and "Maggot Brain". The title track of Maggot Brain was also covered by Mike Watt on his 1995 solo album, Ball-Hog or Tugboat?, which featured J. Mascis of Dinosaur Jr. providing the guitar solo, and organ by Bernie Worrell. Red Hot Chili Peppers bassist Flea reimagines "Maggot Brain" on the trumpet on his 2026 jazz album Honora.

The alternative rock band Sleigh Bells sampled "Can You Get to That?" in their hit song "Rill Rill" from their 2010 album Treats. Rapper Esham, a pioneer of horrorcore, sampled "You and Your Folks, Me and My Folks" and "Super Stupid" on his 1990 song "Red Rum" from his album Boomin' Words from Hell. Rapper Redman pays tribute to the Maggot Brain cover art in the art for his 1994 album Dare Iz a Darkside, which contains a song called "Cosmic Slop" featuring Erick Sermon and Keith Murray, which takes its name from the Funkadelic album of the same name. Childish Gambino's 2016 album "Awaken, My Love!" drew influence from Maggot Brain, as did D'Angelo's 2014 album Black Messiah, which The New York Times said "captured American unrest through the studio murk of Sly Stone, the fervor of Funkadelic and the off-kilter grooves somewhere between J Dilla and Captain Beefheart."

"Super Stupid" was the only cover song recorded by the alternative metal band Audioslave, who were influenced by Funkadelic and included the cover as a live bonus track on their 2005 album Out of Exile. André 3000 of the hip hop group Outkast said of Maggot Brain, "That album blew my mind. It made me want to learn to play guitar, and its huge range of styles – funk, bluegrass, country, opera – helped build our sound." The singer Bilal names it among his 25 favorite albums, citing its "loose" creative direction as an influence on his own music.

== Track listing ==
Side one
No.	Title	Writer(s)	Length
1.	"Maggot Brain"	Edward Hazel; George Clinton	10:21
2.	"Can You Get to That"	Clinton; Ernest Harris	2:50
3.	"Hit It and Quit It"	Clinton; William Nelson	3:50
4.	"You and Your Folks, Me and My Folks"	Clinton; Clarence Haskins; Nelson; Bernard Worrell; Judie Jones (mistakenly credit)	3:36

Side two
No.	Title	Writer(s)	Length
5.	"Super Stupid"	Hazel; Lucious Ross; Nelson; Clinton	4:01
6.	"Back in Our Minds"	Haskins	2:38
7.	"Wars of Armageddon"	Ramon Fulwood; Ross; Clinton; Worrell	9:42
Total length:			36:58

2005 CD reissue bonus tracks
No.	Title	Writer(s)	Length
8.	"Whole Lot of BS"	Clinton; Worrell	2:11
9.	"I Miss My Baby" (United Soul with Funkadelic, from the CD U.S. Music with Funkadelic)	Haskins	5:02
10.	"Maggot Brain" (alternate mix, recorded in 1971)	Hazel; Clinton	9:35
Total length:			53:46

== Personnel ==
Credits are adapted from the album's liner notes.

Funkadelic

- Bernie Worrell – keyboards, vocals (lead vocals on track 3)
- Eddie Hazel – lead guitar, vocals (lead vocals on track 5)
- Tawl Ross – guitar, vocals (co-lead vocals on tracks 6 and 7)
- Billy Nelson – bass guitar, vocals (lead vocals on track 4)
- Tiki Fulwood – drums
- George Clinton – vocals (spoken word on track 1, lead vocals on tracks 6 and 7)
- Raymond Davis – vocals (lead vocals on track 2)
- Fuzzy Haskins, Calvin Simon, Grady Thomas, Garry Shider – backing vocals
- Hot Buttered Soul (Pat Lewis, Diane Lewis, Rose Williams) – backing vocals (track 2)

Production

- Produced by George Clinton
- Executive producer – Armen Boladian
- Bernie Mendelson in charge of The Eegangas
- Mastering - Howard Craft - Mastercraft of Memphis
- Cover photography by Joel Brodsky
- Inside cover photography by Ron Scribner
- Artwork design – The Graffiteria/Paula Bisacca
- Art direction – David Krieger
- Album supervision – Bob Scerbo
- Album co-ordination – Dorothy Schwartz
- Model on album cover – Barbara Cheeseborough
