= Eddie Hazel =

American guitarist (1950–1992)

- Eddie Hazel performing with the P-Funk All Stars at the Palladium in New York City on June 25, 1991. Photo by Aldo Mauro

Background information
- Born: Edward Earl Hazel; April 10, 1950; Brooklyn, New York City
- Died: December 23, 1992 (aged 42) Plainfield, New Jersey
- Genres: Funk; soul; psychedelic rock; psychedelic soul; heavy metal; hard rock
- Years active: 1967–1992
- Labels: Warner Bros., JDC, P-Vine, Casablanca, Westbound, Capitol, CBS, Island

Edward Earl Hazel (April 10, 1950 – December 23, 1992) was an American guitarist and singer in early funk music who played lead guitar with Parliament-Funkadelic. Hazel was a posthumous inductee to the Rock and Roll Hall of Fame, inducted in 1997 with fifteen other members of Parliament-Funkadelic. His ten-minute guitar solo in the Funkadelic song "Maggot Brain" is regarded as "one of the greatest solos of all time on any instrument". In 2023, Rolling Stone ranked Hazel at no. 29 in its list of 250 of the greatest guitarists of all time.

== Biography ==
=== Early life ===
Born in Brooklyn, New York in 1950, Hazel grew up in Plainfield, New Jersey because his mother, Grace Cook, wanted her son to grow up in an environment without the pressures of drugs and crime that she felt pervaded New York City. Hazel occupied himself from a young age by playing a guitar, given to him as a Christmas present by his older brother. Hazel also sang in church. At age 12, Hazel met Billy "Bass" Nelson, and the pair quickly became close friends and began performing, soon adding drummer Harvey McGee to the mix.

=== Career ===
In 1967, the Parliaments, a Plainfield-based doo wop band headed by George Clinton, had a hit record with "(I Wanna) Testify." Clinton recruited a backing band for a tour, hiring Nelson as bassist, who in turn recommended Hazel as guitarist. Hazel was in Newark, New Jersey, working with George Blackwell and could not be reached. After Nelson returned from the tour, he tried to recruit Hazel. His mother at first vetoed the idea, since Hazel was only seventeen, but Clinton and Nelson worked together to change her mind.

In late 1967, the Parliaments went on tour with both Nelson and Hazel. In Philadelphia Hazel met and befriended Tiki Fulwood, who quickly replaced the Parliaments' drummer. Nelson, Hazel and Fulwood became the backbone of Funkadelic, which was originally the backup band for the Parliaments, only to later become an independent touring group when legal difficulties forced Clinton to temporarily abandon the name "Parliaments".

The switch to Funkadelic was complete with the addition of Tawl Ross and Bernie Worrell (rhythm guitar and keyboards, respectively). Funkadelic (1970), Free Your Mind... and Your Ass Will Follow (1970) and Maggot Brain (1971) were the first three albums, released within two years. All three albums prominently featured Hazel's guitar work.

The third album's title song, "Maggot Brain", consists of a ten-minute guitar solo by Hazel. Clinton reportedly told Hazel during the recording session to imagine he had been told his mother had just died while playing the first half of the solo; and to imagine he'd just been told she was still alive while playing the second half. Music critic Greg Tate described it as Funkadelic's A Love Supreme. In 2008, Rolling Stone cited this as number 60 on its list of 100 greatest "guitar songs" of all time.

Nelson and Hazel officially quit Funkadelic in late 1971 over financial disputes with Clinton, though Hazel contributed to the group sporadically over the next several years. The albums America Eats Its Young (1972) and Cosmic Slop (1973) featured only marginal input from Hazel. Instead, Hazel began working with the Temptations (along with Nelson), appearing on 1990 (1973) and A Song for You (1975).

For the 1974 Funkadelic album Standing on the Verge of Getting It On, Hazel co-wrote all of the album's songs. On six of those songs the songwriting credit was in the name of Grace Cook, Hazel's mother. Hazel also had a significant presence as arranger and lead guitarist on the same year's Parliament album, Up For The Down Stroke. In 1974, Hazel was indicted for assaulting an airline stewardess and an air marshal, along with a drug possession charge. While Hazel was in jail, Clinton recruited Michael Hampton as the new lead guitarist for Parliament-Funkadelic.

In the next several years, Hazel appeared occasionally on Parliament-Funkadelic albums, although his guitar work was rarely featured. One song that featured Hazel's lead guitar is "Comin' Round the Mountain" on Hardcore Jollies (1976). In 1977, Hazel recorded a "solo" album, Game, Dames and Guitar Thangs, with support from other members of Parliament-Funkadelic, including vocals from the Brides of Funkenstein. He was completely absent from One Nation Under a Groove (1978), Funkadelic's most commercially successful album. Hazel made another prominent appearance in "Man's Best Friend" on the George Clinton album Computer Games (1982), as well as the track "Pumping It Up" from the P-Funk All Stars album Urban Dancefloor Guerillas.

=== Death ===
On December 23, 1992, Hazel died from internal bleeding and liver failure. "Maggot Brain" was played at his funeral.

Eddie Hazel is buried at Hillside Cemetery in Scotch Plains, New Jersey.

== Legacy ==
Three collections of unreleased recordings have been released posthumously: The 1994 four-song EP Jams From the Heart (which Rhino Records later added as bonus material to its rerelease of Game, Dames and Guitar Thangs), 1994's Rest in P and 2006's Eddie Hazel At Home.

Other recordings by Hazel have appeared on albums by other musicians. Several albums produced by Bill Laswell, including Funkcronomicon (released under the name Axiom Funk, 1995) have featured Hazel's guitar. Bootsy Collins has also incorporated recordings of Hazel in some of his recent releases, for example, "Good Night Eddie" on Blasters of the Universe.

Ween recorded a tribute to Hazel, "A Tear for Eddie", on their album Chocolate And Cheese. There is an image of Hazel on the back of Primal Scream's album Give Out But Don't Give Up. John Frusciante recorded a tribute to Hazel's "Maggot Brain" on his 2009 album The Empyrean in the nine-minute-long "Before the Beginning", while his Red Hot Chili Peppers bandmate Flea would later record his own tribute to Hazel in 2026, releasing a cover of "Maggot Brain" on his debut solo album Honora.

In July 2020, Nick Cave named Hazel as one of his all-time favorite guitarists.

== Sound, guitars, equipment ==
Hazel played in the vein of Jimi Hendrix and added "the aggressive rock and roll sound of Jimi Hendrix into the funky world of James Brown and Sly Stone". He used much reverb and was a "razor sharp" rhythm player, besides an exceptional soloist with "fuzz-drenched leads". He played a variety of guitars including Gibsons, but is best known as a player of Fender Stratocasters. His typical setup included a Marshall 100-watt amplifier, MXR Phase 90 phaser, Echoplex, Maestro FZ-1 Fuzz-Tone, and a Dunlop Cry Baby wah, and in his later days with P-funk a Music Man HD-130 amplifier.

George Clinton recalled that when they were moving from Motown/doo wop toward a more rock and roll oriented sound, they were looking for a heavier, European sound, and he got Hazel a Marshall stack (with an 8x12 cabinet), and a Stratocaster (to replace a big-body Gretsch). Clinton noted, though, that it didn't matter what Hazel played--"it could be a Kay or anything--he could make it sound the same". Asked about effects, Clinton said, "Eddie started right out learning the pedals—the wah wah, the Big Muff, and phasers and shit. We bought all the gadgets in the world".

== Discography ==
Solo recordings

- Game, Dames and Guitar Thangs (1977), Warner Bros.
- A Night for Jimi Hendrix (Live At "Lingerie Club", Hollywood, 1990) [feat. Krunchy]
- Jams From the Heart (1994), JDC - EP
- Rest in P (1994), P-Vine
- At Home (With Family) (2006), Eddie Hazel
- The Basement Rehearsals (feat. Krunchy) (2014)
