= Psychedelic funk =

Music genre

- Other names: Funkadelia; P-Funk
- Stylistic origins: Funk; psychedelic rock; psychedelic soul; acid rock
- Cultural origins: Late 1970s
- Derivative forms: Funk rock; G-funk; Mobb

Fusion genres
- Jazz fusion

Other topics
- Progressive soul; psychedelic music

Psychedelic funk (also called P-funk or funkadelia, and sometimes conflated with psychedelic soul) is a music genre that combines funk music with elements of psychedelic rock. It was pioneered in the late 1960s and early 1970s by American acts like Sly and the Family Stone, Jimi Hendrix, and the Parliament-Funkadelic collective. It would influence subsequent styles including 1970s jazz fusion and the 1990s West Coast hip hop style G-funk.

== History ==
=== Origins: Late 1960s ===
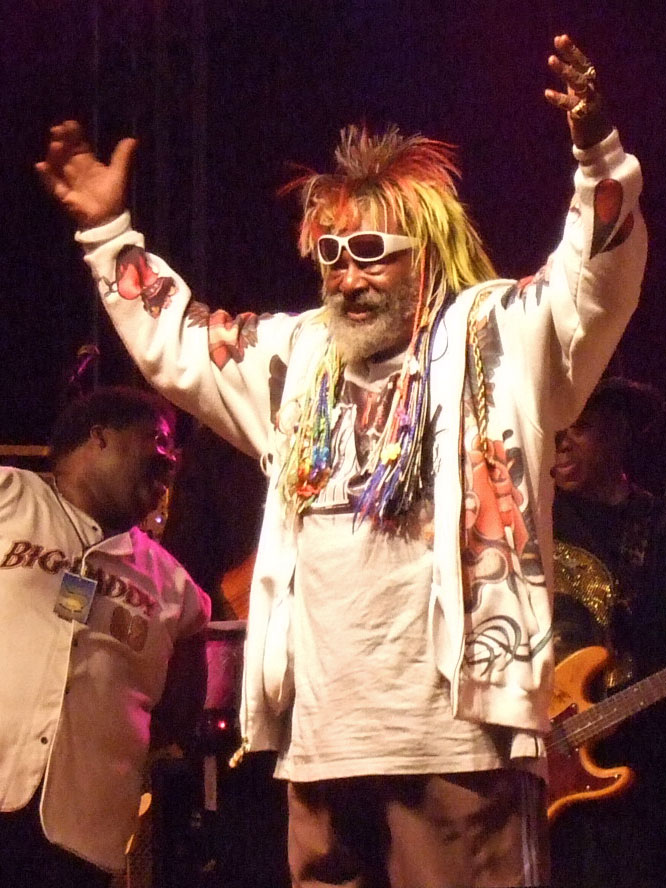
George Clinton performs with Parliament-Funkadelic in 2007.

Inspired by Jimi Hendrix and psychedelic culture, the psychedelic soul group Sly and the Family Stone borrowed techniques from psychedelic rock music, including wah pedals, fuzz boxes, echo chambers, and vocal distorters. On albums such as Life (1968) and Stand (1969), the band pioneered a "multiculturalist, integrationist" psychedelic funk style. This psychedelic sound would also be reflected in the late 1960s output of iconic Detroit label Motown. Producer Norman Whitfield drew on this sound for popular Motown recordings such as The Temptations' "Cloud Nine" and Marvin Gaye's "I Heard It Through the Grapevine," both released in October 1968. Hendrix's November 1968 single "Crosstown Traffic" has been described as an early example of the psychedelic funk subgenre.

=== Development: 1970s–1980s ===
In 1970, Hendrix released the trio album Band of Gypsys, described as "ground zero" for psychedelic funk. The Parliament-Funkadelic collective developed the sensibility, employing acid rock-oriented guitar and synthesizers into open-ended funk jams. Funkadelic's 1971 album Maggot Brain was labeled a monument in the genre by Pitchfork. Led by George Clinton, P-Funk would shift the genre away from song-form and toward groove and texture, emphasizing the abject elements of psychedelia. The Isley Brothers and Bobby Womack would be influenced by Funkadelic and draw on this sound. Womack also contributed to Sly and the Family Stone's landmark 1971 album There's a Riot Goin' On, described as a "masterpiece of darkly psychedelic funk" by AllMusic.

During the early 1970s, the main elements of psychedelic funk were adopted as signifiers of "urban blackness" and incorporated into blaxploitation films. The 1971 James Brown instrumental album Sho Is Funky Down Here, directed by bandleader David Matthews, explored "fuzzy" psychedelic funk. Jazz musician Miles Davis, newly influenced by Sly Stone and Brown, explored the genre on his 1972 album On the Corner. The group War recorded in a psychedelic funk-rock style alongside lyrics protesting racism and police brutality. The 1974 album Inspiration Information by Shuggie Otis explored psychedelic funk and soul, and despite receiving little attention upon release, it later achieved acclaim when it was reissued by the Luaka Bop label.

In the late 1970s, new wave band Talking Heads explored psychedelic funk, influenced by George Clinton and P-Funk, on a trilogy of acclaimed albums. Prince drew on the style, recording in a "richly melodic vein of psychedelic funk" on his 1985 album Around the World in a Day. Author Michaelangelo Matos described Prince's 1987 track “The Ballad of Dorothy Parker” as psychedelic funk, “not in the sense of Funkadelic or Hendrix's Band of Gypsys, but in the sense that its rhythms and textures achieve a molten-lava sense without surrendering the groove.

=== International artists ===
The West German band Can played psychedelic funk as part of that country's 1970s krautrock scene. West African groups such as Blo and Orchestre Poly-Rythmo de Cotonou played forms of psychedelic funk in the mid-1970s, both drawing on the Afrobeat of Nigerian musician Fela Kuti. Turkey's Anatolian rock scene featured psychedelic funk by artists such as Barış Manço. The British band Happy Mondays played a form of "stiff" psychedelic funk on their 1988 album Bummed.

Examples of psychedelic funk from world music scenes have been collected on compilations issued on the World Psychedelic Funk Classics label, including the 2009 compilation Psych-Funk 101: 1968-1975. A collection of 1970s psychedelic funk recordings from Ghana and Togo was released in 2010 as Afro-Beat Airways: West African Shock Waves by the Analog Africa label. Music from Nigeria's 1970s psychedelic funk scene was later documented on the compilation Wake Up You! The Rise & Fall of Nigerian Rock 1972-1977, released in 2016.

== Influence and later developments ==
In the late 1960s and early 1970s, jazz artists such as Miles Davis and Herbie Hancock, influenced by Sly Stone and others, combined elements of psychedelic funk with urban jazz to pioneer jazz fusion. In the 1990s, the popular psychedelic funk style known as G-funk emerged from the West Coast hip hop scene, represented by Dr. Dre, Snoop Dogg, and Warren G. Many G-funk recordings sampled tracks by earlier psychedelic funk bands, most prominently Parliament-Funkadelic.

The 1990s hip hop duo OutKast were also influenced by black psychedelic musicians such as Sly Stone and Clinton. Their 2000 album Stankonia was described as "a trippy sort of techno-psychedelic funk" composed of "programmed percussion, otherworldly synthesizers, and surreal sound effects." The experimental indie pop band of Montreal developed a psychedelic funk sound, particularly on their 2008 album Skeletal Lamping. The 2016 album Awaken, My Love! by Childish Gambino borrowed the psychedelic funk sound of Clinton and Bootsy Collins, with Vice negatively describing it as "pure Funkadelic cosplay."

== See also ==
- Funk
- Psychedelic music
- Psychedelic culture
