= Cosmic Slop =

Album by Funkadelic

Studio album by Funkadelic
- Released: July 9, 1973
- Recorded: 1972–1973
- Studios: United Sound, Detroit; Manta Sound, Toronto
- Genres: Funk; rock; hard rock; proto-heavy metal; psychedelic rock
- Length: 35:32
- Label: Westbound
- Producer: George Clinton

Funkadelic chronology
America Eats Its Young (1972)	Cosmic Slop (1973)	Standing on the Verge of Getting It On (1974)

Singles from Cosmic Slop
- 1. "Cosmic Slop" Released: 1973

Cosmic Slop is the fifth studio album by Funkadelic, released on July 9, 1973 by Westbound Records. While it has been favorably reevaluated by critics long after its original release, the album was a commercial failure, producing no charting singles, and reaching No. 112 on the Billboard pop chart and No. 21 on the R&B chart. The album was re-released on CD in 1991.

Cosmic Slop is the first Funkadelic album to feature artwork and liner notes by Pedro Bell, who assumed responsibility for the band's gate-fold album covers and liner notes until the band's collapse after 1981's The Electric Spanking of War Babies. Bell's liner notes to Cosmic Slop include small illustrations next to each song's name, summarizing the song in a picture. The album also marks the first Funkadelic album without any input from longtime guitarist Eddie Hazel, who had left the band the year before.

== Critical reception ==
Professional ratings
Review scores
Source	Rating
AllMusic	4/5 stars
Blender	3/5 stars
Christgau's Record Guide	B
Mojo	4/5 stars
Q	4/5 stars
Rolling Stone	3.5/5 stars
Spin Alternative Record Guide	9/10

Lloyd Bradley in Q characterized the album as a "cornerstone ... coming just before James Brown sidepersons began defecting to Clinton's outfit' and "a link between fearsomely dark musings and out-and-out strangeness".

== Track listing ==
Side One
No.	Title	Writer(s)	Length
1.	"Nappy Dugout"	George Clinton, Cordell Mosson, Garry Shider	4:33
2.	"You Can't Miss What You Can't Measure"	Clinton, Sidney Barnes	3:03
3.	"March to the Witch's Castle"	Clinton	5:59
4.	"Let's Make It Last"	Clinton, Eddie Hazel	4:08
Total length:			17:43

Side Two
No.	Title	Writer(s)	Length
1.	"Cosmic Slop" (released as a single-Westbound 218)	Clinton, Bernie Worrell	5:17
2.	"No Compute"	Clinton, Shider	3:03
3.	"This Broken Heart"	William Franklin	3:37
4.	"Trash a Go-Go"	Clinton	2:25
5.	"Can't Stand the Strain"	Clinton, Hazel	3:27
Total length:			17:49 35:32

== Personnel ==
- Bernard Worrell – keyboards, melodica, strings on "Broken Heart"
- "Boogie" Mosson – bass guitar
- Tyrone Lampkin – percussion
- Garry Shider – lead and rhythm guitar
- Ron Bykowski – lead and rhythm guitar
- Tiki Fulwood – drums on "Nappy Dugout"
- Parlet members Mallia Franklin and Debbie Wright – vocals (uncredited)
- Engineers: Lee De Carlo, Manta Sound, Toronto

== Songs ==
=== You Can't Miss What You Can't Measure ===
This song is a reworking of the 1965 Parliaments single "Heart Trouble". The main riff of the song was used also in "Do That Stuff" for the 1976 album The Clones of Dr. Funkenstein.

- Lead Vocals: George Clinton, Ray Davis, Garry Shider

=== Cosmic Slop ===
- Lead vocals: Garry Shider
- Guitars: Garry Shider and Ron Bykowski
- Drums: Tyrone Lampkin
- Bass: Cordell Boogie Mosson

This track was remade several times by future lineups of Parliament/Funkadelic. A live version (recorded during a rehearsal) appears on the 1976 Funkadelic album Hardcore Jollies. Several Parliament/Funkadelic members contributed to a full cover of the track for Bill Laswell’s Axiom Funk project, released on the 1995 album Funkcronomicon.

Another live version, from 1983 and released in 1990 on Live at the Beverly Theater, features Dennis Chambers on drums, Rodney Curtis on bass, and Eddie Hazel, Garry Shider, and Michael Hampton on guitar.

=== No Compute ===
- Lead vocals: George Clinton

=== This Broken Heart ===
- Strings: Bernie Worrell
- Lead Vocals: Ben Edwards
- Drums: Geezer McGee (disputed)

== Cosmic Slop compilation ==
In 2000, Castle Music released a 10-track compilation album, also called Cosmic Slop – although it bore no relation to the studio album of the same name. The album's track listing consisted of: "One Nation Under a Groove", "Comin" Round the Mountain", "Cholly (Funk Getting Ready to Roll!)", "Freak of the Week", "Uncle Jam", "Groovallegiance", "Smokey", “Cosmic Slop", "Soul Mate" and "(Medley) Funk Gets Stronger (Killer Millimeter Longer Version)/ She Loves You". The album was subtitled "Original Recordings from the Masters of Funk!"

== See also ==
- The Space Traders
