= Bernie Worrell =

American keyboardist and record producer (1944–2016)

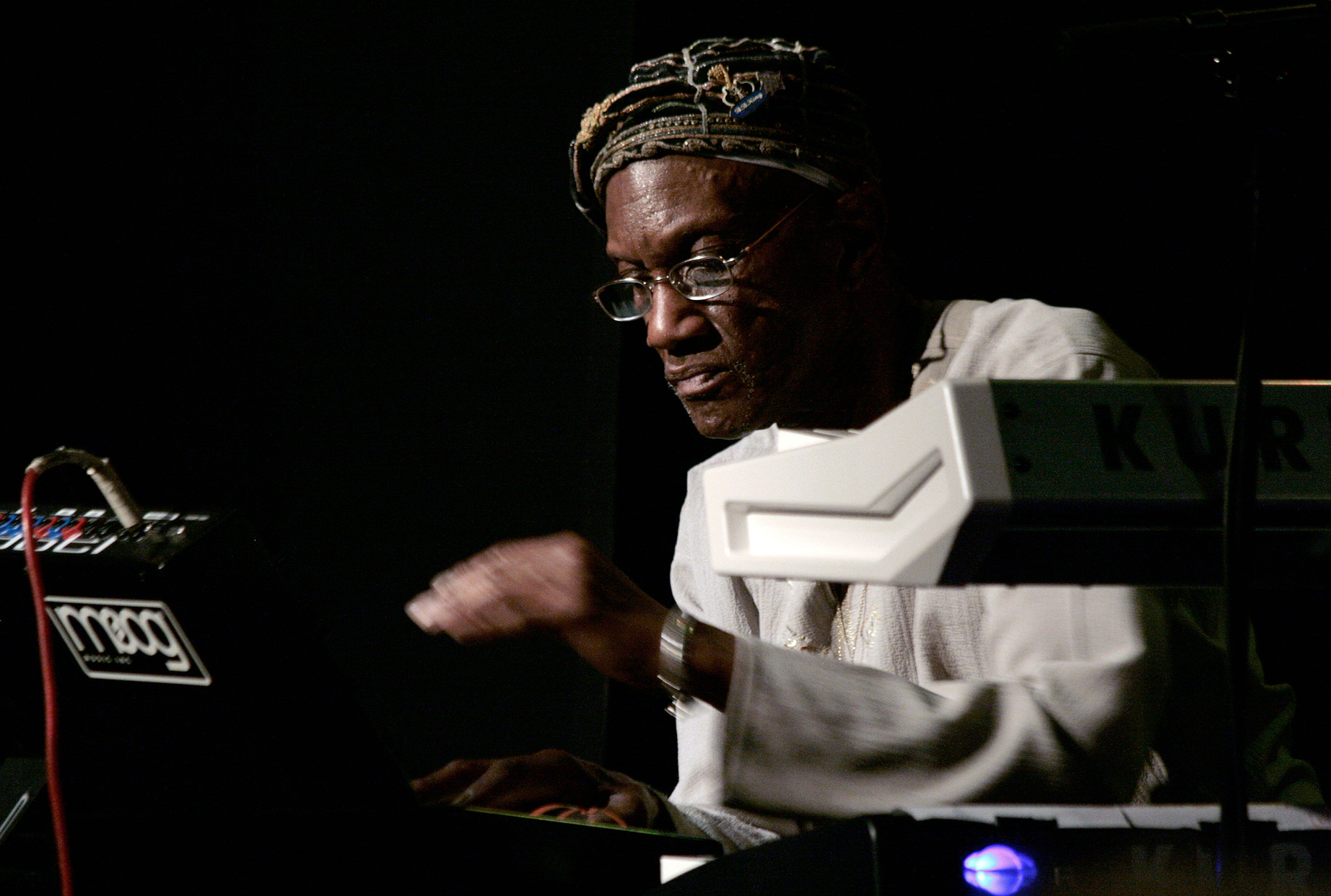
- Worrell performing in Vienna in 2009

Background information
- Also known as: The Wizard of Woo
- Born: George Bernard Worrell, Jr. April 19, 1944; Long Branch, New Jersey, U.S.
- Died: June 24, 2016 (aged 72) Everson, Washington, U.S.
- Genres: Funk; R&B; psychedelic rock
- Occupations: Musician; record producer
- Instruments: Keyboards; piano; organ; synthesizer
- Years active: c. 1970–2016
- Formerly of: Parliament-Funkadelic; Talking Heads; CBS Orchestra; Bernie Worrell Orchestra
- Website: bernieworrell.com

George Bernard Worrell, Jr. (April 19, 1944 – June 24, 2016) was an American keyboardist and record producer, best known as a founding member of the Parliament-Funkadelic collective and a touring member of Talking Heads in the 1980s. He also worked with such producers and musicians as Keith Richards, Yoko Ono, Bill Laswell, Mos Def, Sly and Robbie, Fela Kuti, and Jack Bruce. The New York Times journalist Jon Pareles described Worrell as "the kind of sideman who is as influential as some bandleaders" and stated that he "indelibly changed the sound of funk and hip-hop."

Worrell was inducted into the Rock and Roll Hall of Fame in 1997 as a member of Parliament-Funkadelic. He also appeared with Talking Heads when they were inducted into the Rock and Roll Hall of Fame in 2002. Worrell was the uncle of rapper and actor Chino XL.

== Biography ==
=== Early life ===
George Bernard Worrell, Jr. was born on April 19, 1944, in Long Branch, New Jersey, and grew up in Plainfield, New Jersey, where his family moved when he was eight. His father was a truck driver and his mother sang in church choirs. He was a musical prodigy; by age 3 he was taking piano lessons, at the age of 8 he wrote his first concerto, and when he was 10 years old he performed with members of the Washington Symphony of Washington, Pennsylvania. He studied at the Juilliard School in New York City and graduated from Boston's New England Conservatory of Music in 1967. The school would award him an honorary Doctor of Music degree in May 2016. As a college student, Worrell played organ with an Episcopal church, accompanied a Jewish men's choir, and backed local group Chubby & The Turnpikes (which eventually evolved into Tavares).

=== 1970s ===
When Worrell first met George Clinton, Worrell was the musical director for the R&B singer Maxine Brown. At that time, Clinton, who was also a native of Plainfield, led the Parliaments, a doo-wop group based out of a local barber shop where he worked. The Parliaments, and their backing band Funkadelic, then moved to Detroit and became two intertwined acts known collectively as Parliament-Funkadelic or P-Funk. Worrell moved to Detroit after being recruited by Clinton to serve as their keyboardist, arranger, and bandleader. He officially joined the band after appearing on their 1970 debut album Funkadelic.

Worrell and Clinton co-wrote numerous P-Funk songs, including the funk anthem "Flash Light", which Rolling Stone ranked as No. 25 on the 200 Best Dance Songs of All Time.

Parliament-Funkadelic's futuristic sound can in large part be attributed to Worrell. P-Funk and their spin-off bands, including Bootsy's Rubber Band, The Brides of Funkenstein, Parlet, and The Horny Horns, made dozens of records in the 70s. He played on and wrote and co-wrote horn and rhythm arrangements on recordings for most of them. Worrell played acoustic and electric piano, Hohner Clavinet, Hammond organ, and synthesizers by Moog and ARP. His unique sound and songwriting skills can be heard on such songs as "Flash Light", "Atomic Dog," "Chocolate City", "Mothership Connection (Star Child)," "Aqua Boogie (A Psychoalphadiscobetabioaquadoloop)," and "Red Hot Mama."

Worrell's synth lines were widely sampled throughout the 1990s by hip-hop producers such as Dr. Dre, becoming a bedrock of the West Coast G-funk sound. Worrell's Minimoog bass on "Flash Light" not only heavily influenced the sound of American R&B music, but served as a bridge to new wave, new age, and techno.

In 1978, Worrell released his debut solo album, All the Woo in the World on Arista Records. Co-produced by Worrell and Clinton, it featured many other members of Parliament-Funkadelic and the Brides of Funkenstein.

=== 1980s ===
In the early 1980s, while P-Funk was on a hiatus from touring, Worrell was recruited to record and perform with Talking Heads, along with other musicians such as guitarists Alex Weir and Adrian Belew. Though he never officially joined Talking Heads, he was a de facto member of the group for much of the decade. He appeared on their 1982 live album The Name of This Band Is Talking Heads and on their 1983 studio album Speaking in Tongues, which Rolling Stone's David Fricke said "finally obliterates the thin line separating arty white pop music and deep black funk."

He also toured with the band, notably featuring in the 1984 concert film Stop Making Sense. Directed by Jonathan Demme, the film is considered one of the best concert films of all time. Talking Heads frontman David Byrne once said that "Bernie changed the way I think about music, and the way I think about life."

Talking Heads officially disbanded in 1991, but Worrell was invited to perform with them again for their one-off reunion concert at the 2002 Rock and Roll Hall of Fame induction ceremony.

In 1983, Worrell played on Mtume's hit "Juicy Fruit". In 1984, Worrell co-produced Fred Schneider's solo album Fred Schneider and the Shake Society and played keyboards and synthesizers on some of the album's tracks.

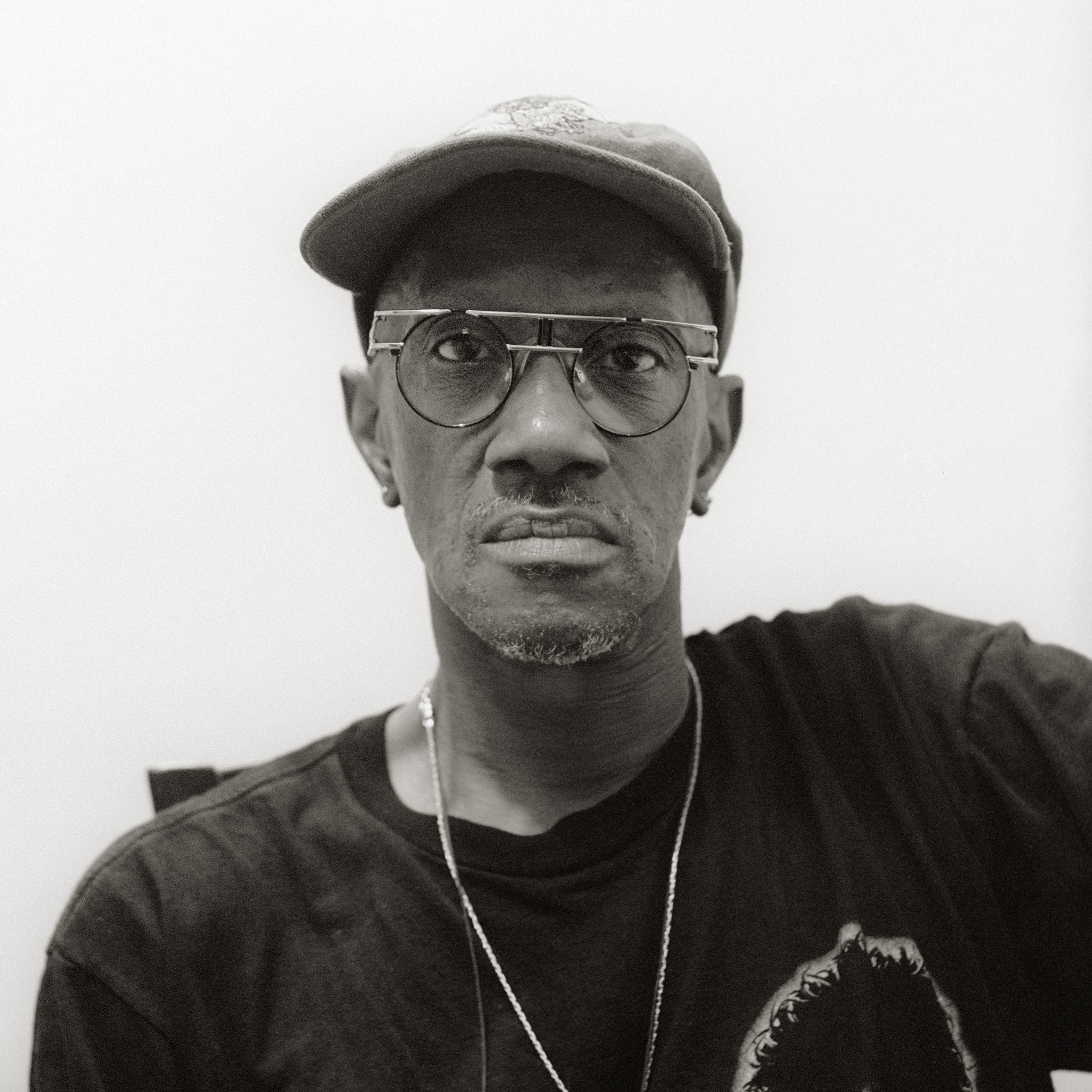
Worrell backstage in Cologne, Germany 1998

In 1987, he appeared on Talking Heads member Jerry Harrison's solo album Casual Gods. The LP featured the U.S. Album Rock Tracks chart hit "Rev It Up," which reached number seven and appeared in the film Something Wild.

=== 1990s–2010s ===
From the late 1980s through the 2010s, Worrell recorded extensively with producer Bill Laswell, including on Sly and Robbie's 1987 Rhythm Killers, the 1985 Fela Kuti album Army Arrangement, and two albums in the 1990s with jazz saxophonist Pharoah Sanders (Save Our Children and Message From Home). He became a visible member of the jam band scene, performing at large summer music festivals, sometimes billed as "Bernie Worrell and the Woo Warriors," and later as "The Bernie Worrell Orchestra." Worrell frequently performed with Warren Haynes's band Gov't Mule. Between the years 1989 and 2003, he appeared on several Jack Bruce albums, including A Question of Time, Cities of the Heart, Monkjack, and More Jack than God.

When The Late Show with David Letterman launched in August 1993, Worrell was a founding member of the CBS Orchestra, playing lead synthesizer. That following November, Worrell departed once the orchestra added a horn section.

In 1994, Worrell appeared on the Red Hot Organization's compilation album, Stolen Moments: Red Hot + Cool. The album, meant to raise awareness and funds in support of the AIDS epidemic in the African-American community, was heralded as "Album of the Year" by Time magazine.

In 2002, after meeting at the Bonnaroo music festival, Worrell, bassist Les Claypool of Primus, guitarist Buckethead, and drummer Brain formed the supergroup Colonel Claypool's Bucket of Bernie Brains. They released one album, The Big Eyeball in the Sky (2004).

Around that same time, Worrell formed Black Jack Johnson with Mos Def, Will Calhoun, Doug Wimbish, and Dr. Know. In 2004, they appeared on Mos Def's album The New Danger. That same year, he appeared in the documentary Moog, about synthesizer pioneer Robert Moog.

In 2009, he joined longtime Parliament-Funkadelic guitarist DeWayne "Blackbyrd" McKnight, bassist Melvin Gibbs, and drummer J.T. Lewis to form the band SociaLybrium, who toured Europe. Their album For You/For Us/For All was released on Livewired Music in January 2010. He toured with Bootsy Collins, another major figure from Parliament-Funkadelic, in 2011.

From 2011 through 2015, Worrell performed with his group, The Bernie Worrell Orchestra. The band, which was formed out of a partnership with a young New Jersey producer named Evan Taylor, was known for appearance of special guests at their live performances, including Bootsy Collins, Jerry Harrison, bassist Tina Weymouth and drummer Chris Frantz of Talking Heads and Tom Tom Club, Blondie keyboardist Jimmy Destri, bassist Mike Watt of Minutemen and Firehose, and Captain Beefheart guitarist Gary Lucas. They released two albums, BWO is Landing and Prequel.

In 2012 and 2013, Worrell also played a series of concerts with rock guitarist Steve Kimock, Gov't Mule bassist Andy Hess, and vocalist-percussionist Camille Armstrong. In 2013, Kimock's son John Morgan Kimock played drums for the group.

In 2015, Worrell appeared in the movie Ricki and the Flash as Billy, the keyboard player in Meryl Streep's band. The film, about a woman who leaves her family behind to join a rock band, reunited Worrell with director Jonathan Demme, who had directed the Talking Heads concert film Stop Making Sense.

Worrell and Preston Singletary cofounded the indigenous music group Khu.éex'.

== Wave from the WOOniverse ==
In 2024, "Wave from the WOOniverse" a posthumous double-album, was released, using unfinished tracks Worrell left behind. The album was produced by former Bernie Worrell bandleader Evan Taylor and contributors include Talking Heads's Jerry Harrison, The B-52s' Fred Schneider, Sean Lennon, Marc Ribot, Fishbone's Norwood Fisher, Mike Watt, and Cibo Matto's Miho Hatori.

== Death ==
In January 2016, Worrell was diagnosed with a "mild form" of prostate cancer, stage-four liver cancer, and stage-four lung cancer. He relocated from his longtime home in New Jersey to Bellingham, Washington.

Two benefit concerts at Webster Hall in New York on April 4 and 5, 2016, helped raise funds for Worrell's cancer treatment. Produced by the Black Rock Coalition, the event featured musicians and celebrities including Meryl Streep, George Clinton, Paul Shaffer, Jerry Harrison, Bootsy Collins, Nona Hendryx, Living Color, and Jonathan Demme.

On May 9, Worrell's wife Judie posted an update on his condition on his Facebook page:

As of Friday, Bernie can barely speak. Tumor has grown and Recurrent laryngeal nerve is pressing on vocal cord, paralyzing it. Treatment starts Tuesday to (hopefully) shrink tumor before it gets to other vocal cord and/or shuts down breathing. VERY difficult time for him.
I am updating y'all because many asked BUT do not consider this an invitation to bombard us with treatment ideas. Bernie is deciding what treatment he wants. I will delete any more messages that do not respect his decision(s).

Judie issued a statement on Facebook on June 16 to friends and family that "I was just told that Bernie is now headed 'Home'." She encouraged people close to Worrell to "visit him to say your goodbyes" and added that he was too ill to speak on the phone or text.

Bernie Worrell died at his home in Everson, Washington, on June 24, 2016, at the age of 72. Following his death, Buckethead released the tribute song "Space Viking".

== Documentary ==
Stranger: Bernie Worrell on Earth is a documentary film about Worrell's life, music and impact. At AllMovie, critic Mark Deming wrote that the film "profiles his life and career while also examining how even a genius has to find a way to make a living".

== Discography ==
=== Solo albums ===
- 1978: All the Woo in the World
- 1990: Funk of Ages
- 1993: Blacktronic Science
- 1993: Pieces of Woo: The Other Side
- 1997: Free Agent: A Spaced Odyssey
- 2007: Improvisczario
- 2009: Christmas Woo
- 2010: I Don't Even Know
- 2011: Standards
- 2013: BWO Is Landing (credited as "The Bernie Worrell Orchestra")
- 2014: Prequel (credited as "The Bernie Worrell Orchestra")
- 2014: Elevation: The Upper Air
- 2016: Retrospectives
- 2024: Wave From The WOOniverse

=== Funkadelic ===
- 1970: Funkadelic
- 1970: Free Your Mind... and Your Ass Will Follow
- 1971: Maggot Brain
- 1972: America Eats Its Young
- 1973: Cosmic Slop
- 1974: Standing on the Verge of Getting It On
- 1975: Let's Take It to the Stage
- 1976: Tales of Kidd Funkadelic
- 1976: Hardcore Jollies
- 1978: One Nation Under a Groove
- 1979: Uncle Jam Wants You
- 1996: Live: Meadowbrook, Rochester, Michigan – 12th September 1971
- 2008: Toys (recorded 1970–74)
- 2014: First Ya Gotta Shake the Gate

=== Parliament ===
- 1970: Osmium
- 1974: Up for the Down Stroke
- 1975: Chocolate City
- 1975: Mothership Connection
- 1976: The Clones of Dr. Funkenstein
- 1977: Live: P-Funk Earth Tour
- 1977: Funkentelechy Vs. the Placebo Syndrome
- 1978: Motor Booty Affair
- 1979: Gloryhallastoopid
- 1980: Trombipulation

=== Selected contributions to other albums ===
- 1977: Johnnie Taylor, Rated Extraordinare
- 1981: Jerry Harrison, The Red and the Black
- 1981: The Spinners, Can't Shake This Feeling
- 1982: George Clinton, Computer Games
- 1982: Talking Heads, The Name of This Band Is Talking Heads
- 1983: Mtume, Juicy Fruit
- 1983: Talking Heads, Speaking in Tongues
- 1984: Talking Heads, Stop Making Sense
- 1983: Rita Coolidge, Never Let You Go
- 1984: Fred Schneider, Fred Schneider and the Shake Society
- 1985: Fela Kuti, Army Arrangement
- 1985: The Golden Palominos, Visions of Excess
- 1986: Ginger Baker, Horses & Trees
- 1986: Public Image Ltd, Album
- 1987: Jerry Harrison, "Casual Gods"
- 1987: Jesse Rae, The Thistle
- 1992: Praxis, Transmutation (Mutatis Mutandis)
- 1995: Jack Bruce, Monkjack
- 1995: Julian Schnabel, Every Silver Lining Has a Cloud
- 1995: Third Rail (James Blood Ulmer & Bill Laswell), South Delta Space Age
- 1996: Pharoah Sanders, Message from Home
- 1998: Robben Ford, Tiger Walk
- 1998: Live... With a Little Help from Our Friends [Gov’t Mule]
- 1998: Pharoah Sanders, Save Our Children
- 2001: Shin Terai, Unison
- 2004: Colonel Claypool's Bucket of Bernie Brains, The Big Eyeball in the Sky
- 2004: Mos Def, The New Danger
- 2005: Munkeez Strikin' Matchiz, Wreck It (with Bo Diddley and Chuck D.)
- 2006: Gigi, Gold & Wax
- 2006: Baby Elephant, Turn My Teeth Up
- 2007: Shin Terai, Lightyears
- 2007: Praxis, Tennessee 2004
- 2008: Praxis, Profanation (Preparation for a Coming Darkness)
- 2008: Science Faxtion, Living on Another Frequency
- 2009: Eric McFadden Trio, Delicate Thing
- 2016: Joe Marcinek Band, Slink
- 2017: Jesse Rae, Worae

== Awards ==
- Independent Music Awards 2013: "Get Your Hands Off" - Best Funk/Fusion/Jam Song
