= Funk rock =

Music genre

- Stylistic origins: Funk; rock; psychedelic soul
- Cultural origins: Late 1960s – early 1970s, United States
- Typical instruments: Bass guitar; electric guitar; drums; saxophone; keyboard; vocals
- Derivative forms: New wave

Fusion genres
- Funk metal

Regional scenes
- Minneapolis sound

Other topics
- List of funk rock bands; post-punk; punk funk; dance-punk; rap rock

Funk rock is a fusion genre that mixes elements of funk and rock. James Brown and others declared that Little Richard and his mid-1950s road band, the Upsetters, were the first to put the funk in the rock and roll beat, with a biographer stating that their music "spark[ed] the musical transition from fifties rock and roll to sixties funk".

Funk rock's earliest incarnation on record was heard in the late 1960s through the mid-1970s by acts such as Sly and the Family Stone, Parliament-Funkadelic, The Isley Brothers, Redbone, Rick Derringer, David Bowie, the Average White Band, Gary Wright, Bar-Kays and Mother's Finest. During the 1980s and 1990s funk rock music experienced a surge in popularity, with bands such as Prince, Pigbag, INXS, Talking Heads, Devo, the Fine Young Cannibals and Cameo dabbling in the sound. Groups including Red Hot Chili Peppers, Rage Against the Machine, Incubus, Mr. Bungle, Primus and Faith No More also notably combined funk rock with metal, punk, hip hop and experimental music, leading to the emergence of the genre known as funk metal or "punk-funk".

== History ==
=== 1960s and 1970s ===
Sly and the Family Stone gained funk rock hits such as "Sing a Simple Song" and "Thank You (Falettinme Be Mice Elf Agin)". The Jimi Hendrix Experience album Electric Ladyland also included a couple of funk rock songs, such as "Gypsy Eyes" and "Still Raining, Still Dreaming".

George Clinton has been considered the godfather of this genre since 1970. Clinton created the name "P-Funk" include Funkadelic and Parliament for the innovative new concepts of funk that he culled from former members of James Brown's band (such as Maceo Parker, Bootsy Collins and Fred Wesley) and new young players such as Eddie Hazel. His groups, Funkadelic and Parliament, practically defined funk since the release of the influential funk rock Funkadelic classic Maggot Brain (1971). Later funk rock albums by the group include Cosmic Slop, Standing on the Verge of Getting It On, Hardcore Jollies and Let's Take It to the Stage. Later albums such as One Nation Under a Groove and Electric Spanking of War Babies had a bit more radio-friendly sound but still preserved much of group's funk rock approach.

Grand Funk Railroad pioneered the bass driven hard rock funk style in 1970, for example in their cover of the Animals song "Inside-Looking Out". Composer and guitarist Frank Zappa demonstrated the merge of styles in albums like Overnite Sensation, in themes such as "I'm the Slime", covered in concert decades later by Funkadelic.

Other pioneers evolved in the 1970s are American artists Rick Derringer, Redbone, the Bar-Kays, and Mother's Finest. "We called ourselves funk rock", recalled Mother's Finest singer Glenn "Doc" Murdock. "I think we invented that. We even had a house where we all lived and we named it 'Funk Rock, Georgia'. We felt that we were headlining that whole genre. We played with Lynyrd Skynyrd and AC/DC. Those bands had a lot of funk in their music. The real problem for us was when we played in black clubs. They told us we were too loud."

Funk rock acts were not favored by R&B recording companies. For example, Nile Rodgers, guitarist of Chic, wanted to be a rock band like Roxy Music, but they eventually became a disco act after being turned down by recording companies. Despite its considerable influence on later popular music, funk rock was not a very visible phenomenon during the 1970s. Only a few funk rock acts could be seen on record charts, notably David Bowie ("Fame", 1975), Aerosmith ("Last Child", 1976), The Rolling Stones ("Hot Stuff", 1975), Gary Wright ("Love Is Alive", 1976) and Steve Winwood ("I'm A Man").

When Glenn Hughes left Trapeze and joined Deep Purple along with David Coverdale, Deep Purple's next two albums contained elements of funk and soul. When Ritchie Blackmore left Deep Purple in 1975, the band's next album Come Taste the Band with Tommy Bolin was even more funky than its predecessor Stormbringer. However, Deep Purple broke up in 1976 and Tommy Bolin died from a drug overdose.

=== 1980s ===
From the start of the 1980s, funk musicians Ricky Sander, Ottenheim James, and Cameo as well as new wave band Blondie and post-punk band Talking Heads each created their own brand of funk rock. British rock group Queen had a major funk rock hit song of the period with "Another One Bites the Dust" (the beat was inspired by Chic's hit "Good Times"). Also in the 1980s, some synth-funk and synth-pop bands such as Thomas Dolby, Scritti Politti, Howard Jones (hit with Things Can Only Get Better) made the basic funk beats along with elements of new wave which makes this a basic synth-funk song.

Red Hot Chili Peppers's first three albums were released in this decade, becoming amongst the first bands to combine punk rock influences with funk. Their second album, Freaky Styley, was produced by Parliament-Funkadelic bandleader George Clinton. UK Planet Radio called Red Hot Chili Peppers "funk rock legends".

=== 1990s ===
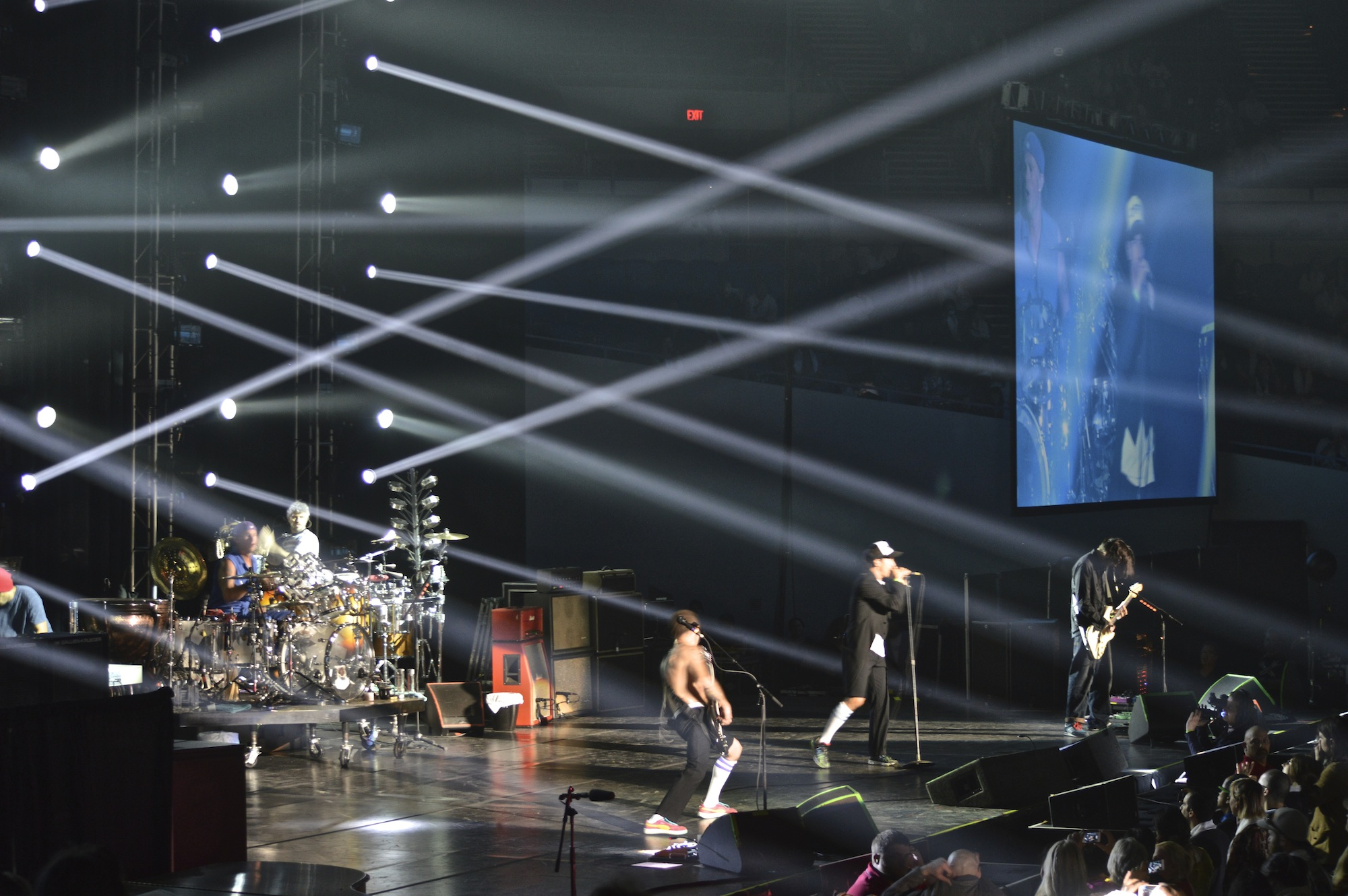
Red Hot Chili Peppers at the Environmental Summit 2013 Portland Oregon. Playing for the Dalai Lama.

Keziah Jones, Seal, and Stevie Salas released funk rock albums. And in the early 1990s, several bands combined funky rhythms with heavy metal guitar sounds, resulting in "funk metal", where the emphasis is in using much heavier distorted guitar sounds in the mix. Funk rock employs more of a lighter, "crunchier" distorted guitar sound, and the musical emphasis tends to be more beat-driven with prominent bass lines; more rhythmic in the R&B sense.

Lenny Kravitz is one of the most prominent musicians today in the fusion of rock riffs and funk rhythms, as exampled in tracks such as "Tunnel Vision", "Always on the Run", and "American Woman". Rock band Incubus's early sound was rooted in funk music, heavily influenced by earlier funk/metal fusion artists such as Faith No More and Primus. During the making of his acclaimed studio album Voodoo (2000), neo soul musician D'Angelo was influenced by the funk rock sound of P-Funk, Jimi Hendrix and other such artists, while his hit single "Untitled (How Does It Feel)" has been noted by critics for containing elements of and similarity to the Maggot Brain sound of Funkadelic. Jane's Addiction have included many funk based routines in tracks. Irish band Republic of Loose are also noted for their funk rock sound which has earned them several awards and critical acclaim.

In the late 1990s, Vermont-based jam band Phish began incorporating funk influences into their sound, creating a style dubbed "cow funk". This style can be heard prominently on their 1998 release, The Story of the Ghost.

Some Britpop bands also experimented with funk, mainly in terms of bass lines, including Blur's song "Girls & Boys", from the album Parklife (1994).

=== 2000s–present ===
During the 2000s, Red Hot Chili Peppers, N.E.R.D. Electric Six, and Lenny Kravitz released funk rock albums. In 2005 Defiance Douglass, a vocalist, musician, songwriter and producer, formed Exiles of the Nation (also known as EOTN) in Atlanta, Georgia, with a new brand of art/psychedelic Funk/Rock titled "ExileMusik", which incorporates elements of other genres as well. Their 2021 album, "Liquidation", also made the Top 10 of several "Best of 2021 Funk Albums" lists. The wave of Britpop/baggy revival bands in the 2010s, such as Peace, also experimented with funk. Peace's second album Happy People features numerous elements of funk, mainly in terms of bass lines. In 2010, a group called I Set The Sea On Fire formed in Sheffield, incorporating elements of funk and other genres into their music.

In 2014, Prince formed a new backing band, 3rdeyegirl. Their brand of funk rock was featured on their 2014 release, Plectrumelectrum.

== See also ==
- Blues rock
- Blue-eyed soul
- List of funk rock bands
- Psychedelic soul
- Psychedelic funk
- Rap rock

== Sources ==
- Palmer, Robert (2011). Blues & Chaos: The Music Writing of Robert Palmer. Simon and Schuster. ISBN 978-1-4165-9974-6.
