= Funkadelic =

American rock band

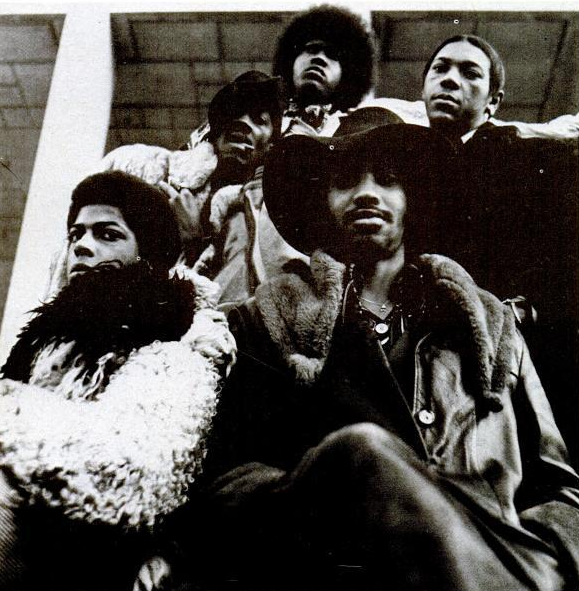
- Funkadelic in 1972

Background information
- Origin: Plainfield, New Jersey, U.S.
- Genres: Funk rock; psychedelic funk; acid rock; psychedelic rock
- Works: Funkadelic discography
- Years active: 1968–1982; 2014
- Labels: Westbound; Warner Bros.
- Spinoffs: Parliament-Funkadelic; The Brides of Funkenstein; Bootsy's Rubber Band
- Spinoff of: The Parliaments
- Past members: George Clinton; Grady Thomas; Ray Davis; Clarence "Fuzzy" Haskins; Calvin Simon; Terrence Fulton Aka Sweetpea; Eddie Hazel; Tawl Ross; William "Billy Bass" Nelson; Tiki Fulwood; Mickey Atkins; Bernie Worrell; Harold Beane; Garry Shider; Cordell "Boogie" Mosson; William "Bootsy" Collins; Phelps "Catfish" Collins; Ron Bykowski; Prakash John; Tyrone Lampkin; Leon Patillo; Jimi Calhoun; Michael Hampton; Glen Goins; Jerome "Bigfoot" Brailey; Debbie Wright; Jeanette Washington; Dawn Silva; Walter "Junie" Morrison; Rodney Curtis; Mallia Franklin; Larry Fratangelo; DeWayne "Blackbyrd" McKnight; David Spradley; Ruth Copeland; Dennis Chambers; Frankie "Kash" Waddy; Sidney Barnes

Funkadelic was an American funk rock band formed in Plainfield, New Jersey, in 1968 and active until 1982. As one of the two flagship groups of George Clinton's P-Funk collective, they helped pioneer the funk music culture of the 1970s. Funkadelic initially formed as a backing band for Clinton's vocal group the Parliaments (later the full-fledged band Parliament), but eventually pursued a heavier, psychedelic rock-oriented sound in their own recordings. They released acclaimed albums such as Maggot Brain (1971) and One Nation Under a Groove (1978).

== History ==
=== Background ===
The group that would become Funkadelic was formed by George Clinton in 1964, as the unnamed backing section for his doo wop group the Parliaments while on tour. The band originally consisted of musicians Frankie Boyce, Richard Boyce, and Langston Booth plus the five members of the Parliaments on vocals. Boyce, Boyce, and Booth enlisted in the Army in 1966, and Clinton recruited bassist Billy Bass Nelson and guitarist Eddie Hazel in 1967, then added guitarist Tawl Ross and drummer Tiki Fulwood. The name "Funkadelic" was coined by Nelson after the band relocated to Detroit. By 1968, because of a dispute with Revilot, the record company that owned the Parliaments' name, the ensemble began playing under the name Funkadelic.

=== Psychedelic era ===
As Funkadelic, the group signed to Westbound in 1968. Around this time, the group's music evolved from soul and doo wop into a harder guitar-driven mix of psychedelic rock, soul and funk, much influenced by the popular musical (and political) movements of the time. Jimi Hendrix, Sly Stone, the MC5, and Vanilla Fudge were major inspirations. This style later evolved into a tighter guitar and horns-based funk (circa 1971–75), which subsequently, during the height of Parliament-Funkadelic success (circa 1976–81), added elements of R&B and electronic music, with fewer psychedelic rock elements. The band made their first live television performance on Say Brother on October 7, 1969. They played a jam with songs "Into My Own Thing" (Sly and the Family Stone cover), "What Is Soul?", "(I Wanna) Testify", "I Was Made to Love Her" (Stevie Wonder cover), "Friday Night, August 14th" and "Music for My Mother".

The group's self-titled debut album, Funkadelic, was released in 1970. The credits listed organist Mickey Atkins plus Clinton, Fulwood, Hazel, Nelson, and Ross. The recording also included the rest of Parliament's singers (still uncredited because of contractual concerns), several uncredited session musicians then employed by Motown, as well as Ray Monette (of Rare Earth) and future P-Funk mainstay Bernie Worrell.

Bernie Worrell was officially credited starting with Funkadelic's second album, Free Your Mind... and Your Ass Will Follow (1970), thus beginning a long working relationship between Worrell and Clinton. The album Maggot Brain followed in 1971. The first three Funkadelic albums displayed strong psychedelic influences (not least in terms of production) and limited commercial potential, despite containing many songs that stayed in the band's setlist for several years and would influence many future funk, rock, and hip-hop artists.

After the release of Maggot Brain, the Funkadelic lineup expanded greatly. Tawl Ross was unavailable after experiencing either a bad LSD trip or a speed overdose, while Billy Bass Nelson and Eddie Hazel quit due to financial concerns. From this point, many more musicians and singers would be added during Funkadelic's (and Parliament's) history, including the recruitment of several members of James Brown's backing band, the JB's, in 1972 – most notably Bootsy Collins and the Horny Horns. Bootsy and his brother Catfish Collins were recruited by Clinton to replace the departed Nelson and Hazel. Bootsy in particular became a major contributor to the P-Funk sound. In 1972, this new line-up released the politically charged double album America Eats Its Young. The lineup stabilized a bit with the album Cosmic Slop in 1973, featuring major contributions from recently added singer-guitarist Garry Shider. After first leaving the band, Eddie Hazel spent a year in jail after assaulting an airline flight attendant and air marshal while under the influence of PCP, then he returned to make major contributions to the album Standing on the Verge of Getting It On (1974). Hazel only contributed to P-Funk sporadically thereafter.

=== P-Funk ===
George Clinton revived Parliament in 1974 and signed them to Casablanca Records. Parliament and Funkadelic featured mostly the same stable of personnel but operated concurrently under two names. At first, Parliament was designated as a more mainstream funk ensemble dominated by soulful vocals and horn arrangements, while Funkadelic was designated as a more experimental and freestyle guitar-based funk band. The ensemble usually toured under the combined name Parliament-Funkadelic or simply P-Funk (which also became the catch-all term for George Clinton's rapidly growing stable of funk artists). In 1975, Funkadelic released its most successful album yet, Let's Take It to the Stage, which nearly cracked the R&B top ten and the Billboard 100.

Later in 1975 Michael Hampton, a teen guitar prodigy, replaced Hazel as the premier lead guitarist in Parliament-Funkadelic, and was a major contributor to the next several Funkadelic albums. Funkadelic left Westbound in 1976 and moved to Warner Brothers. Their first album for Warner was Hardcore Jollies released in 1976. Just before leaving Westbound, Clinton provided that label with a collection of recently recorded outtakes, which Westbound released as the album Tales of Kidd Funkadelic. That album did significantly better commercially than Hardcore Jollies and included "Undisco Kidd", an R&B Top 30 single. In 1977, Westbound capitalized further by releasing the anthology The Best of the Early Years.

=== Mainstream success ===
As Parliament began achieving significant mainstream success in the 1975–1978 period, Funkadelic recorded and released its most successful and influential album, One Nation Under a Groove in 1978, adding former Ohio Players keyboardist Walter "Junie" Morrison and reflecting a more melodic dance-based sound. The title track spent six weeks at number one on the R&B chart, around the time that Parliament was enjoying the number one R&B singles "Flash Light" and "Aqua Boogie". Uncle Jam Wants You in 1979 continued Funkadelic's new more electronic sound production. The album contains the fifteen-minute "(Not Just) Knee Deep" featuring former Spinners lead singer Philippé Wynne, an edited version of which topped the R&B charts. The final official Funkadelic album, The Electric Spanking of War Babies, was released in 1981. The release was originally a double-album project, but it was reduced to a single disc under pressure from Warner Brothers. Some of the deleted tracks would appear on future P-Funk releases, most notably the 1982 hit single "Atomic Dog" which appeared on the first George Clinton solo album.

Meanwhile, the album Connections & Disconnections (re-issued on CD as Who's a Funkadelic) was released under the name Funkadelic in 1981. The album was recorded by former Funkadelic members and original Parliaments Fuzzy Haskins, Calvin Simon, and Grady Thomas, who had left P-Funk in 1977 after disagreements with George Clinton's management practices. This LP, notable for its heavy use of Thomas "Pae-dog" McEvoy's jazz horn, contains the track called "You'll Like It Too", which became a very popular breakbeat source for the hip-hop community in the 1980s. Former band member drummer Jerome Brailey released the album Mutiny on the Mamaship, by his new band Mutiny.

=== Dissolution ===
In the early 1980s, with legal difficulties arising from the multiple names used by multiple groups, as well as a shakeup at Parliament's record label, George Clinton dissolved Parliament and Funkadelic as recording and touring entities. However, many of the musicians in later versions of the two groups remained employed by Clinton. Clinton continued to release new albums regularly, sometimes under his own name and sometimes under the name George Clinton & the P-Funk All-Stars. In the mid-1980s, the penultimate Funkadelic studio album By Way of the Drum was recorded by Clinton with P-Funk personnel and many electronic devices. The album was rejected by its record label and did not see official release in America until it appeared as a reissue in 2007. It features a cover of "Sunshine Of Your Love" by Cream. The album did not receive any publicity but still received favorable reviews.

=== Legacy ===
Clinton continued his P-Funk collective in the 1990s and 2000s, with a revolving stable of musicians, some of whom remain from the classic lineups of Funkadelic and Parliament. The rock-oriented sound of Funkadelic has diminished, as Clinton has moved towards more of an R&B and hip-hop sound. In 1997 the group was inducted into the Rock and Roll Hall of Fame.

Filmmaker Yvonne Smith of New York City-based Brazen Hussy productions produced Parliament-Funkadelic: One Nation Under a Groove, a full-length documentary about the groundbreaking group, which aired on PBS in 2005. As of 2008, Clinton was at work on a new Funkadelic album for his new record label. In November 2008, Westbound Records released Toys, a collection of Funkadelic outtakes and demos from the Free Your Mind and America Eats Its Young era. Critical reception of the album has generally been positive. In April 2013, the band released their first single in over 25 years when they released "The Naz". The song is a collaboration with Sly Stone and tells the story of Jesus Christ. The B-side to the song is "Nuclear Dog" which is guitar solo by P-Funk guitarist Dewayne "Blackbyrd" McKnight.

Funkadelic had a major influence on a large number of hip-hop artists, and the genre of hip-hop as a whole. In particular, Dr. Dre references Funkadelic's sound as a major influence on his music, especially his G-funk sound. Funkadelic's 1979 release "(Not Just) Knee Deep" in particular was sampled extensively by G-Funk artists, including placements on Dr. Dre's The Chronic, Snoop Dogg's Doggystyle, MC Hammer's Street Fighter OST, De La Soul's Me Myself and I and Tupac's All Eyez on Me.

== Discography ==
- Funkadelic (1970)
- Free Your Mind... and Your Ass Will Follow (1970)
- Maggot Brain (1971)
- America Eats Its Young (1972)
- Cosmic Slop (1973)
- Standing on the Verge of Getting It On (1974)
- Let's Take It to the Stage (1975)
- Tales of Kidd Funkadelic (1976)
- Hardcore Jollies (1976)
- One Nation Under a Groove (1978)
- Uncle Jam Wants You (1979)
- Connections & Disconnections (1980)
- The Electric Spanking of War Babies (1981)
- By Way of the Drum (2007)
- First Ya Gotta Shake the Gate (2014)

== See also ==
- List of funk musicians
- List of funk rock bands
