= Cordell Mosson =

American bassist (1952–2013)

- Birth name: Cardell Mosson
- Born: October 16, 1952
- Died: April 18, 2013 (aged 60)
- Genres: R&B; funk; psychedelic soul
- Occupation: Musician
- Instrument(s): Bass guitar, guitar, drums
- Years active: 1971–2013

Cordell "Boogie" Mosson (born Cardell Mosson; October 16, 1952 – April 18, 2013) was an American bassist who was a member of Parliament-Funkadelic. He was given a Lifetime Achievement Award Grammy in 2019.

Mosson was born in New Brunswick, New Jersey, but grew up in Plainfield, New Jersey.

== Biography ==
A good friend of Garry Shider, the two left Plainfield, New Jersey in their teens for Canada. They joined a band called United Soul, which came to the attention of George Clinton, who had known Shider as a youth in Plainfield. In 1971 Clinton produced several tracks by United Soul with input from members of Funkadelic. The songs "I Miss My Baby" and "Baby I Owe You Something Good" were released as a one-off single by Westbound Records in 1971 under the group name U.S. Music with Funkadelic. All the tracks recorded with Clinton in 1971 were released by Westbound in 2009 as the album U.S. Music With Funkadelic. After producing United Soul, Clinton then invited Mosson and Shider to join Parliament-Funkadelic. Two United Soul songs were rerecorded on later Funkadelic albums with Mosson as a member.

Mosson was a prominent contributor to albums by both Funkadelic and Parliament from 1972 until the dissolution of the two groups in the early 1980s, and was the featured on-stage bassist for Parliament-Funkadelic after Bootsy Collins went solo. While Collins is more widely remembered as the P-Funk bassist, Mosson's contributions were arguably more numerous and are well regarded by fans. Mosson also appeared in the movie PCU as himself, in 1994.

His name as spelled on his birth certificate is Cardell Mosson, and "Cordell" is his son's name, a common spelling in the notes for most of the Parliament-Funkadelic albums on which he appeared. Mosson is a member of the Rock and Roll Hall of Fame, inducted in 1997 with fifteen other members of Parliament-Funkadelic. He was also honored by the Recording Academy with a Lifetime Achievement Award Grammy in 2019. His children and long time partner received the award on his behalf.

Mosson died of liver failure on April 18, 2013.
