= Ray Davis (musician) =

American bass singer (1940–2005)

Raymond Davis (March 29, 1940 – July 5, 2005) was the original bass singer and one of the founding members of The Parliaments, and subsequently the bands Parliament, and Funkadelic, collectively known as P-Funk. His regular nickname while he was with those groups was "Sting Ray" Davis. Aside from George Clinton, he was the only original member of the Parliaments not to leave the Parliament-Funkadelic conglomerate in 1977. He is a member of the Rock and Roll Hall of Fame, inducted in 1997 with fifteen other members of Parliament-Funkadelic.

== Biography ==
He was born in Sumter, South Carolina to Julius and Carrie Bell (Pack) Davis, and worked with Roger Troutman and Zapp in the early to mid-1980s. His distinctive bass can be heard on "I Can Make You Dance," and "Doo Wa Ditty." He was also briefly in a later period line-up of The Temptations, joining after the death of original bass singer Melvin Franklin, and appearing on the 1995 album For Lovers Only. Davis left the group after being diagnosed with throat cancer. In later years, he performed with former Temptation Glenn Leonard in Leonard's group, The Temptations Experience. And in 1998, along with original Parliament-Funkadelic members Clarence "Fuzzy" Haskins, Calvin Simon, and "Shady Grady" Thomas, he formed the Original P.

Davis died in New Brunswick, New Jersey on July 5, 2005, at the age of 65, of respiratory problems.
