= Westbound Records =

American record label

Westbound Records was a Detroit-based record label founded by Armen Boladian in 1968. It had a distribution deal with Janus Records from 1970 to 1975, but then it switched distribution to 20th Century Records during 1975 and 1976, then again switched distribution to Atlantic Records from 1976 to 1979.

The label's most successful and influential act was Funkadelic, including the classic “Maggot Brain”. Its biggest hit was "The Americans" recorded by local news reporter Byron MacGregor in 1974. Westbound was also home to the Ohio Players before they went to Mercury Records and the label had a top 15 hit with "Funky Worm." Former Ric-Tic and Motown group The Fantastic Four also found moderate success during the disco era under the label. The Detroit Emeralds, who had also recorded briefly for Ric-Tic in the late 1960s, signed with Westbound in 1970 and enjoyed a string of hit singles, most notably 1972's "Feel The Need In Me". The record company's last national hit was 1983's "You Brought the Sunshine" by The Clark Sisters.

The label is still owned by Boladian, with its office in the Detroit suburb of Southfield on West Ten Mile Road. Westbound also had a sister label called Eastbound Records.

== See also ==
- List of record labels
