= Holland–Dozier–Holland: Detroit 1969–1977 =

Compilation album by Various artists
- Released: 3 May 2024
- Label: Demon Music Group

Holland–Dozier–Holland: Detroit 1969–1977 is a compilation album of songs released on the labels Invictus and Hot Wax, which were formed by songwriting team Holland–Dozier–Holland after they left Motown. The album was released by Demon Music Group on 3 May 2024.

== Background ==
Holland–Dozier–Holland is the collective name of the songwriting team comprising Lamont Dozier and brothers Eddie and Brian Holland, who started working together at Motown in 1962. The Marvelettes' "Locking Up My Heart" was their first hit.

In 1967 Holland–Dozier–Holland left Motown and established their own record labels, Hot Wax and Invictus, with other Motown staff. The Guardian wrote that "despite lacking Motown's promotional apparatus, Hot Wax/Invictus had amassed several hits by 1971." Dozier left the labels in 1973 and moved to Los Angeles to pursue a solo career. In 1977 Invictus, Hot Wax and the Hollands' new label Music Merchant "collapsed in fiscal disarray."

== Critical reception ==
Professional ratings
Review scores
Source	Rating
Mojo	5/5 stars
Record Collector	5/5 stars
Uncut	8/10

Uncut wrote that "if Holland–Dozier–Holland couldn't build an empire of their own to rival [Berry] Gordy's, this set...proves that their efforts added something more than a postscript to their matchless Motown legacy." In a 5-star review for Record Collector, Lois Wilson wrote that the album "cherry picks 45s from the catalogue and is an absolute treat."

== Track listing ==
No.	Title	Artist	Length
1.	"Band of Gold" (single mix)	Freda Payne	2:55
2.	"Give Me Just A Little More Time"	Chairmen of the Board	2:42
3.	"Westbound #9"	Flaming Ember	3:33
4.	"Frightened Girl"	Silent Majority	2:20
5.	"The Music Box"	Ruth Copeland	3:40
6.	"Girl It Ain't Easy"	Honey Cone	3:13
7.	"Pay To The Piper"	Chairmen of the Board	3:08
8.	"Want Ads"	Honey Cone	2:47
9.	"Unhooked Generation"	Freda Payne	2:31
10.	"Crumbs Off The Table"	Glass House	2:48
11.	"All We Need Is Understanding"	Chairmen of the Board	2:55
12.	"While You're Out Looking For Sugar"	Honey Cone	2:45
13.	"Somebody's Been Sleeping"	100 Proof (Aged in Soul)	3:07
14.	"Everything's Tuesday"	Chairmen of the Board	2:50
15.	"Deeper and Deeper"	Freda Payne	3:03
16.	"(You've Got Me) Dangling on a String"	Chairmen of the Board	2:59
17.	"Mind, Body & Soul"	Flaming Ember	2:56
18.	"Bring the Boys Home"	Freda Payne	3:31
19.	"I Shall Not Be Moved"	The Barrino Brothers	2:27
20.	"You've Got to Crawl Before You Walk"	8th Day	2:53
21.	"Don't You (Think the Times A-Comin')"	Lucifer	2:54
22.	"Sunday Morning People"	Honey Cone	2:44
23.	"I Surrendered"	Glass House	3:11
24.	"You Brought The Joy"	Freda Payne	2:57
25.	"I'm In Love Darling"	General Johnson	2:45
26.	"She's Not Just Another Woman" (single mix)	8th Day	3:05
27.	"Stick-Up"	Honey Cone	3:03
28.	"90 Day Freeze (On Her Love)"	100 Proof (Aged in Soul)	2:48
29.	"Gotta Get Away"	Flaming Ember	4:27
30.	"Eeny-Meeny-Miny Mo"	8th Day	2:21
31.	"Cherish What Is Dear To You"	Freda Payne	3:57
32.	"Heaven Is There To Guide Us"	Glass House	3:38
33.	"Working On a Building of Love"	Chairmen of the Board	2:56
34.	"If I Could See The Light"	8th Day	3:05
35.	"Why Can't We Be Lovers"	Lamont Dozier, Holland–Dozier	4:05
36.	"Elmo James"	Chairmen of the Board	3:30
37.	"Rip Off"	Laura Lee	3:17
38.	"Try It, You'll Like It"	The Barrino Brothers	3:01
39.	"Sliced Tomatoes"	Just Brothers	2:22
40.	"Thanks I Needed That"	Glass House	2:45
41.	"Crumbs Off The Table"	Laura Lee	3:36
42.	"You've Been My Rock"	Warlock	2:51
43.	"Woman's Love Rights"	Laura Lee	3:15
44.	"Don't Leave Me Starvin' for Your Love"	Holland–Dozier featuring Brian Holland	3:24
45.	"Free Your Mind"	The Politicians	2:51
46.	"Sunday Morning People"	Harrison Kennedy	3:10
47.	"Let's Change The Subject"	Satisfaction Unlimited	3:59
48.	"Nothing Sweeter Than Her Love"	100 Proof (Aged In Soul)	3:24
49.	"Let Me Ride"	Danny Woods	3:04
50.	"Since I Fell For You"	Laura Lee	8:03
51.	"Something New About You"	Silent Majority	3:08
52.	"Under My Wings"	Smith Connection	3:41
53.	"Love Factory"	Eloise Laws	3:25
54.	"We've Got To Find A Way Back to Love"	Freda Payne	3:06
55.	"Taster Of The Honey"	Jones Girls	2:52
56.	"I'm Bugging Your Phone"	Smith Connection	2:38
57.	"Can't Get Enough Of You"	Tyrone Edwards	3:00
58.	"If I Can't Fly"	Honey Cone	3:25
59.	"I Got It Pt. 1"	New York Port Authority	3:34
60.	"Finders Keepers"	Chairmen of the Board	3:22
61.	"That's Love"	Hi-Lites	3:08
62.	"Two Wrongs Don't Make A Right"	Freda Payne	3:22
63.	"New Breed Kinda Woman"	Lamont Dozier	2:53
64.	"Put A Little Love Into It"	Eloise Laws	3:32
65.	"You Made Me Over"	Melvin Davis	3:32
66.	"Somebody Is Always Messing Up A Good Thing"	Honey Cone	3:26
67.	"I'm So Glad Pt.1"	Brian Holland	3:59
68.	"Skin I'm In"	Chairmen of the Board	3:17

== Personnel ==
- Liner notes – Stuart Cosgrove
