= The Chairmen of the Board (album) =

1970 debut album by Chairmen of the Board

Studio album by Chairmen of the Board
- Released: 1970
- Studios: HDH Studios, Detroit, Michigan
- Genre: Soul
- Label: Invictus
- Producers: HBH Productions, Inc.

Chairmen of the Board chronology
The Chairmen of the Board (1970)	In Session (1970)

The Chairmen of the Board, later reissued as Give Me Just a Little More Time, is the 1970 debut album by the soul group Chairmen of the Board.

== Chart performance ==
The album debuted on Billboard magazine's Top LP's chart in the issue dated May 2, 1970, peaking at No. 133 during a ten-week run on the chart.

== Track listing ==
=== Side one ===
1. "Give Me Just a Little More Time" (Edith Wayne, Ron Dunbar) – 2:38
2. "Come Together" (John Lennon, Paul McCartney) – 3:50
3. "Bless You" (Norman Johnson, Ron Dunbar) – 2:49
4. "Patches" (Norman Johnson, Ron Dunbar) – 3:31
5. "Since the Days of Pigtails & Fairytales" (Edith Wayne, Ron Dunbar) – 2:41
6. "I'll Come Crawling" (Edith Wayne, Ron Dunbar) – 2:38

=== Side two ===
1. "(You've Got Me) Dangling on a String" (Edith Wayne, Ron Dunbar) – 3:00
2. "Bravo, Hooray" (Norman Johnson) – 3:12
3. "Didn't We" (Jimmy Webb) – 2:41
4. "Feelin' Alright?" (Dave Mason) – 3:40
5. "My Way" (Claude François, Jacques Revaux, Paul Anka) – 3:57
6. "Tricked & Trapped" (Edith Wayne, Ron Dunbar) – 3:20

== Personnel ==
Chairmen of the Board

- Danny Woods
- General Johnson
- Eddie Custis
- Harrison Kennedy

Technical

- Tony Camillo - arrangements
- Lawrence Horn - engineer

== Charts ==
Chart (1970)	Peak position
US Billboard Top LPs	133
