= Thanks I Needed That =

Studio album by the Glass House
- Released: 1972
- Studio: HDH Sound Studios, Detroit
- Genre: R&B
- Label: Invictus
- Producer: Holland–Dozier–Holland

The Glass House chronology
Inside the Glass House (1971)	Thanks I Needed That (1972)

Singles from Thanks I Needed That
- 1. "Giving Up the Ring" Released: 1972; 2. "V.I.P" Released: 1972; 3. "Thanks, I Needed That" Released: 1972

Thanks I Needed That is the second and final album by Detroit-based group the Glass House, released in 1972 on the Invictus label.

== History ==
The title track peaked at No. 47 on the R&B chart and was the last single the group recorded. The other two singles released, "V.I.P." and "Giving Up the Ring", failed to chart.

== Reception ==
Professional ratings
Review scores
Source	Rating
AllMusic	2.5/5 stars

Andrew Hamilton of AllMusic stated that "Not as charming as their debut LP. Ty Hunter, Sherrie Payne, Sylvia Smith and Larry Mitchell, all good singers, don't have much here to show their skills. Sylvia gives her all on the moving ballad "That Man I'll Never Have," and "Stealing Moments From Another Woman's Life" is alright."

== Track listing ==
No.	Title	Writer(s)	Length
1.	"V.I.P."	Angelo Bond, General Johnson, Greg Perry	3:55
2.	"A House Is Not a Home"	Burt Bacharach, Hal David	3:17
3.	"I Don't See Me in Your Eyes Anymore"	Ron Dunbar, Edith Wayne, Daphne Dumas	3:44
4.	"Horse and Rider"	Brian Holland, Lamont Dozier, Scherrie Payne	5:11
5.	"The Man I'll Never Have"	Brenda Holt, Pearl Jones	3:08

No.	Title	Writer(s)	Length
1.	"Thanks I Needed That"	Holland–Dozier–Holland	2:45
2.	"Giving Up the Ring"	Holland–Dozier–Holland, Ty Hunter	2:39
3.	"Don't Let It Rain on Me"	Brian Holland, Lamont Dozier, Scherrie Payne	3:28
4.	"Stealing Moments from Another Woman's Life"	Brian Holland, Lamont Dozier	2:35
5.	"Let It Flow"	Brian Holland, Lamont Dozier, Scherrie Payne	2:57
6.	"Don't Go Looking for Something (You Don't Want to See)"	Edith Wayne, Ron Dunbar	3:33

== Personnel ==
Adapted from liner notes.

- Scherrie Payne, Ty Hunter, Sylvia Smith, Larry Mitchell – vocals
- Ed Redd – engineer, mixer

== Charts ==
Year	Title	Chart positions
Year	Title	U.S. R&B Singles
1972	"Thanks, I Needed That"	47
