= José Bruyr =

Belgian poet and musicologist

A photo of José Bruyr and his wife Berthe Bunel, taken in 1922.

José Bruyr (18 March 1889 – 1980) was a 20th-century French-speaking Belgian poet.

== Biography ==
José Bruyr was among the founding fathers of the Académie Charles-Cros. He was also a member of the Claude Debussy committee in Saint-Germain-en-Laye. A musicographer and music critic, he has written several books on Arthur Honegger, operetta, history of music, and on composers such as Franz Schubert, Franz Liszt, Johannes Brahms, Jules Massenet, Maurice Ravel, and so on.

He was in touch with Francis Poulenc, Maurice Ravel, Alfred Cortot, Henri Dutilleux, Olivier Messiaen, the Belgian composer Marcel Orban and Russian Igor Stravinsky and Ivan Wyschnegradsky as well as musicologists Armand Panigel, Jean Roy, Antoine Goléa, Jacques Bourgeois and Léon Vallas. He was a friend of Georges Fesch, franco-belgian banker and composer, Jacques Fesch's father. José Bruyr has been involved from the beginning in the French radio show Club des amateurs de disques, later entitled La Tribune des critiques de disques. He is buried at the cimetière ancien de Saint-Germain-en-Laye
