= Inside the Glass House =

Studio album by the Glass House
- Released: 1971
- Recorded: 1969–1971 at HDH Sound Studios, Detroit
- Genre: R&B
- Label: Invictus
- Producer: William Weatherspoon, Greg Perry, Holland–Dozier–Holland, Ron Dunbar (exec.)

The Glass House chronology
Inside the Glass House (1971)	Thanks I Needed That (1972)

Singles from Inside the Glass House
- 1. "Crumbs Off the Table" Released: August 1969; 2. "If It Ain't Love, It Don't Matter" Released: 1970; 3. "Look What We've Done to Love" Released: 1971

Inside the Glass House is the debut album by Detroit-based soul group the Glass House, released in 1971 on the Invictus label.

== History ==
The album featured three singles, one of them that became a hit. The first single, "Crumbs off the Table", peaked at No. 59 on the Hot 100 and No. 7 on the R&B chart. "If It Ain't Love, It Don't Matter" peaked at No. 42 on the R&B chart. "Look What We've Done to Love" peaked at No. 101 on the Hot 100 and on No. 31 R&B. The album track, "Touch Me Jesus", was originally recorded by the Blossoms, which resulted in a lawsuit being filed in June 1971.

== Reception ==
Professional ratings
Review scores
Source	Rating
AllMusic	3/5 stars

Andrew Hamilton of AllMusic stated "Ty Hunter's falsetto croons the hurting lyrics about the perils of taking love for granted, the LP version flows over four minutes, the single only gave you 2:45 of the harmonious ballad. Their biggest record, "Crumbs Off the Table" led by Payne, has snappy lyrics and a hesitating groove."

== Track listing ==
No.	Title	Writer(s)	Length
1.	"Look What We've Done To Love"	Edith Wayne, Ron Dunbar	4:30
2.	"You Ain't Livin' Unless You're Lovin'"	Daphne Dumas, Edith Wayne, Ron Dunbar	3:03
3.	"I Surrendered"	Greg Perry, Ron Dunbar	3:11
4.	"Hey There Lonely Girl"	Earl Shuman, Leon Carr	3:29

No.	Title	Writer(s)	Length
1.	"If It Ain't Love (It Don't Matter)"	Edith Wayne, Ron Dunbar	2:47
2.	"Hotel"	Greg Perry, Scherrie Payne	3:09
3.	"Touch Me Jesus"	Angelo Bond, Brian Holland, Lamont Dozier	2:46
4.	"Heaven Is There To Guide Us"	Brian Holland, Lamont Dozier, Scherrie Payne	3:40
5.	"Crumbs Off the Table"	Edith Wayne, Ron Dunbar, Scherrie Payne	2:47

== Personnel ==
- Scherrie Payne, Ty Hunter, Pearl Jones, Larry Mitchell – vocals (except "Touch Me Jesus")
- The Blossoms – vocals on "Touch Me Jesus"
- McKinley Jackson, H. B. Barnum, Tony Camillo – arrangements
- Lawrence Horn – engineer

== Charts ==
Year	Title	Chart positions	
Year	Title	U.S. Hot 100	U.S. R&B
1969	"Crumbs off the Table"	59	7
1971	"If It Ain't Love, It Don't Matter"	–	42
1971	"Look What We've Done to Love"	101	31
