= Self Portrait (Ruth Copeland album) =

Self Portrait (album)

Studio album by Ruth Copeland
- Released: 1970
- Recorded: 1970
- Genre: Pop; folk; funk; soul
- Length: 43:46
- Label: Invictus
- Producer: Ruth Copeland

Ruth Copeland chronology
Self Portrait (album) (1970)	I Am What I Am (1971)

Professional ratings
Review scores
Source	Rating
Allmusic	2/5 stars

Self Portrait is the 1970 debut album by English singer Ruth Copeland. The album was released by Invictus Records in 1970 and produced by Ruth Copeland, though it is widely believed that the actual producer of the album was her then husband Jeffrey Bowen working under an alias. The album presumably was recorded during the same sessions that produced Parliament's debut album, Osmium.

In 1996 both Ruth Copeland albums were licensed by HDH Inc. and reissued by P-Vine Records individually. In 1997 both Ruth Copeland albums were reissued on one CD under the juxtaposed title Self Portrait/I Am What I Am (Deepbeats DEEPM 022). It was then issued under the title Gimme Shelter - The Invictus Sessions (Castle Music CMRCD 576). Both compilations omitted the track "Un Bel Di (One Fine Day)". To date, both Ruth Copeland albums have not been released in the U.S. on CD. The two (complete) albums, plus bonus single mixes of some of the songs, were released in a two-disc set by UK label Edsel Records in October 2009.

== Track listing ==
All tracks composed by Ruth Copeland; except where indicated

1. "Prologue: Child of the North"
2. "Thanks for the Birthday Card"
3. "Your Love Been So Good To Me" (Tawl Ross, Copeland, George Clinton)
4. "The Music Box" (Copeland, Ron Dunbar, Edythe Wayne)
5. "The Silent Boatman"
6. "To William in the Night" (Copeland, Gwendolyn Alexander, Edythe Wayne, Ron Dunbar)
7. "No Commitment" (released as the B-side to "Hare Krishna" - Invictus Is 9088)
8. "I Got a Thing For You Daddy" (Copeland, Eddie Hazel, George Clinton)
9. "A Gift of Me" (Copeland, Edythe Wayne, Ron Dunbar)
10. "Un Bel Di (One Fine Day)" from "Madame Butterfly" (Giacomo Puccini)

== Personnel ==
- Ruth Copeland - vocals, acoustic guitar, backing vocals, arrangements, cover illustration
- Eddie Hazel, Dennis Coffey, Ray Monette, Tawl Ross - guitar
- Billy Bass Nelson, Bob Babbitt - bass
- Bernie Worrell - keyboards
- Tiki Fulwood, Andrew Smith - drums
- Detroit Symphony Orchestra
- Choraliers Gospel Singers
- George Clinton, Tom Neme, Tony Camillo - musical assistance

Technical

- Lawrence Horn - engineer
- Evan Soldinger - photography
