= 13th Annual Grammy Awards =

1971 US music awards ceremony

- Date: 16 March 1971
- Location: Hollywood Palladium, Los Angeles, California
- Hosted by: Andy Williams
- Most awards: Paul Simon (5)
- Most nominations: Paul Simon and The Carpenters (5)

Television/radio coverage
- Network: ABC

The 13th Annual Grammy Awards were held on 16 March 1971, on ABC, and marked the ceremony's first live telecast. They recognized accomplishments by musicians from the year 1970. The ceremony was hosted for the first time by Andy Williams.

== Performers ==
- The Osmonds - Everything is Beautiful
- Anne Murray - Fire and Rain
- Aretha Franklin - Bridge Over Troubled Water
- Dionne Warwick - Let It Be
- Marty Robbins - My Woman, My Woman, My Wife
- Charley Pride
- Conway Twitty - Hello Darlin'
- Wanda Jackson
- Hank Williams Jr. - The Fightin' Side of Me
- Rod McKuen
- Three Dog Night - Joy to the World
- The Carpenters - We've Only Just Begun

== Presenters ==
- Burt Bacharach - Song of the Year
- John Wayne - Best Original Score Written For A Motion Picture Or Television Special
- David Cassidy & Shirley Jones - Best Pop Duo/Group with Vocals
- The 5th Dimension - Record of the Year
- Henry Mancini - Best New Artist
- Zsa Zsa Gabor & Bob Newhart - Best Comedy Recording
- Glen Campbell & Lainie Kazan - Best Country Vocal Performance Female
- Freda Payne & Brook Benton - Best Male R&B Vocal Performance
- Duke Ellington - Best Jazz Performance - Small Group
- Nancy Sinatra & Bobby Sherman - Best Contemporary Vocal Performance Female
- Herb Alpert - Album of the Year

== Award winners ==
=== General field ===
Record of the Year

- "Bridge over Troubled Water" - Simon & Garfunkel ‡

Roy Halee, Art Garfunkel & Paul Simon, producers

- "(They Long to Be) Close to You" - The Carpenters

Jack Daugherty, producer

- "Everything Is Beautiful" - Ray Stevens

Ray Stevens, producer

- "Fire and Rain" - James Taylor

Peter Asher, producer

- "Let It Be" - The Beatles

George Martin, producer

Album of the Year

- Bridge over Troubled Water - Simon & Garfunkel ‡

Roy Halee, Art Garfunkel & Paul Simon, producers

- Chicago - Chicago

James William Guercio, producer

- Close to You - The Carpenters

Jack Daugherty, producer

- Déjà Vu - Crosby, Stills, Nash & Young

David Crosby, Stephen Stills, Graham Nash, Neil Young, producers

- Elton John - Elton John

Gus Dudgeon, producer

- Sweet Baby James - James Taylor

Peter Asher, producer

Song of the Year

- "Bridge over Troubled Water" ‡

Paul Simon, songwriter (Simon and Garfunkel)

- "Everything is Beautiful"

Ray Stevens, songwriter (Ray Stevens)

- "Fire and Rain"

James Taylor, songwriter (James Taylor)

- "Let It Be"

John Lennon, Paul McCartney, songwriters (The Beatles)

- "We've Only Just Begun"

Roger Nichols & Paul Williams, songwriters (The Carpenters)

Best New Artist

- The Carpenters ‡
- Elton John
- Melba Moore
- Anne Murray
- The Partridge Family

=== Children's ===
Best Recording for Children

- The Sesame Street Book & Record - (various artists) ‡

Joan Ganz Cooney, Thomas Z. Shepard, producers

- The Aristocats - (various artists)
- A Boy Named Charlie Brown - (various artists)
- "Rubber Duckie" - Jim Henson
- Susan Sings Songs from Sesame Street - Loretta Long

=== Classical ===
- Best Classical Performance, Orchestra
  - Pierre Boulez (conductor) & the Cleveland Orchestra for Stravinsky: Le Sacre du Printemps
- Best Classical Vocal Soloist Performance
  - Dietrich Fischer-Dieskau for Schubert: Lieder
- Best Opera Recording
  - Erik Smith (producer), Colin Davis (conductor), the Royal Opera House Orchestra & Chorus & various artists for Berlioz: Les Troyens
- Best Choral Performance (other than opera)
  - Gregg Smith (choir director), the Gregg Smith Singers & the Columbia Chamber Ensemble for Ives: New Music of Charles Ives
- Best Classical Performance - Instrumental Soloist or Soloists (with or without orchestra)
  - George Szell (conductor), David Oistrakh, Mstislav Rostropovich & the Cleveland Orchestra for Brahms: Double Concerto (Concerto in A Minor for Violin and Cello)
- Best Chamber Music Performance
  - Eugene Istomin, Leonard Rose & Isaac Stern for Beethoven: The Complete Piano Trios
- Album of the Year, Classical
  - Erik Smith (producer), Colin Davis (conductor), various artists & the Royal Opera House Orchestra & Chorus for Berlioz: Les Troyens

=== Comedy ===
- Best Comedy Recording
  - Flip Wilson for The Devil Made Me Buy This Dress

=== Composing and arranging ===
- Best Instrumental Composition
  - Alfred Newman (composer) for "Airport Love Theme"
- Best Original Score Written for a Motion Picture or a Television Special
  - George Harrison, John Lennon, Paul McCartney & Ringo Starr (composers) for Let It Be performed by The Beatles
- Best Instrumental Arrangement
  - Henry Mancini (arranger) for "Theme From Z"
- Best Arrangement Accompanying Vocalist(s)
  - Larry Knechtel & Paul Simon (arrangers) for "Bridge over Troubled Water" performed by Simon & Garfunkel

=== Country ===
- Best Country Vocal Performance, Female
  - Lynn Anderson for "Rose Garden"
- Best Country Vocal Performance, Male
  - Ray Price for "For the Good Times"
- Best Country Vocal Performance by a Duo or Group
  - Johnny Cash & June Carter for "If I Were a Carpenter"
- Best Country Instrumental Performance
  - Chet Atkins & Jerry Reed for Me and Jerry
- Best Country Song
  - Marty Robbins (songwriter) for "My Woman, My Woman, My Wife"

=== Folk ===
- Best Ethnic or Traditional Recording (including traditional blues)
  - T-Bone Walker for Good Feelin'

=== Gospel ===
- Best Gospel Performance (other than soul gospel)
  - The Oak Ridge Boys for "Talk About the Good Times"
- Best Soul Gospel Performance
  - Edwin Hawkins for "Every Man Wants to Be Free" performed by the Edwin Hawkins Singers
- Best Sacred Performance (Musical)
  - Jake Hess for "Everything Is Beautiful"

=== Jazz ===
- Best Jazz Performance - Small Group or Soloist with Small Group
  - Bill Evans for Alone
- Best Jazz Performance - Large Group or Soloist with Large Group
  - Miles Davis for Bitches Brew

=== Musical show ===
- Best Score From an Original Cast Show Album
  - Stephen Sondheim (composer), Thomas Z. Shepard (producer) & the original cast (Dean Jones, Barbara Barrie, Elaine Stritch, Charles Kimbrough, George Coe, Teri Rolston, John Cunningham & Beth Howland) for Company

=== Packaging and notes ===
- Best Album Cover
  - Robert Lockart (graphic artist) & Ivan Nagy (photographer) for Indianola Mississippi Seeds performed by B.B. King
- Best Album Notes
  - Chris Albertson (notes writer) for The World's Greatest Blues Singer performed by Bessie Smith

=== Pop ===
- Best Contemporary Vocal Performance, Female
  - Dionne Warwick for I'll Never Fall in Love Again
- Best Contemporary Vocal Performance, Male
  - Ray Stevens for "Everything Is Beautiful"
- Best Contemporary Vocal Performance by a Duo, Group or Chorus
  - The Carpenters for "Close to You"
- Best Contemporary Instrumental Performance
  - Henry Mancini for Theme From Z and Other Film Music
- Best Contemporary Song
  - Paul Simon (songwriter) for "Bridge over Troubled Water" performed by Simon & Garfunkel

=== Production and engineering ===
- Best Engineered Recording, Non-Classical
  - Roy Halee (engineer) for Bridge over Troubled Water performed by Simon & Garfunkel
- Best Engineered Recording, Classical
  - Arthur Kendy, Fred Plaut, Ray Moore (engineers), Pierre Boulez (conductor) & the Cleveland Orchestra for Stravinsky: Le Sacre du Printemps

=== R&B ===
- Best R&B Vocal Performance, Female
  - "Don't Play That Song" by Aretha Franklin
- Best R&B Vocal Performance, Male
  - "The Thrill Is Gone" by B.B. King
- Best R&B Performance by a Duo or Group, Vocal or Instrumental
  - "Didn't I (Blow Your Mind This Time)" by The Delfonics
- Best Rhythm & Blues Song
  - General Johnson & Ronald Dunbar (songwriters) for "Patches" performed by Clarence Carter

=== Spoken ===
- Best Spoken Word Recording
  - Martin Luther King Jr. for Why I Oppose the War in Vietnam
