= Ken Knox =

American rhythm and blues musician

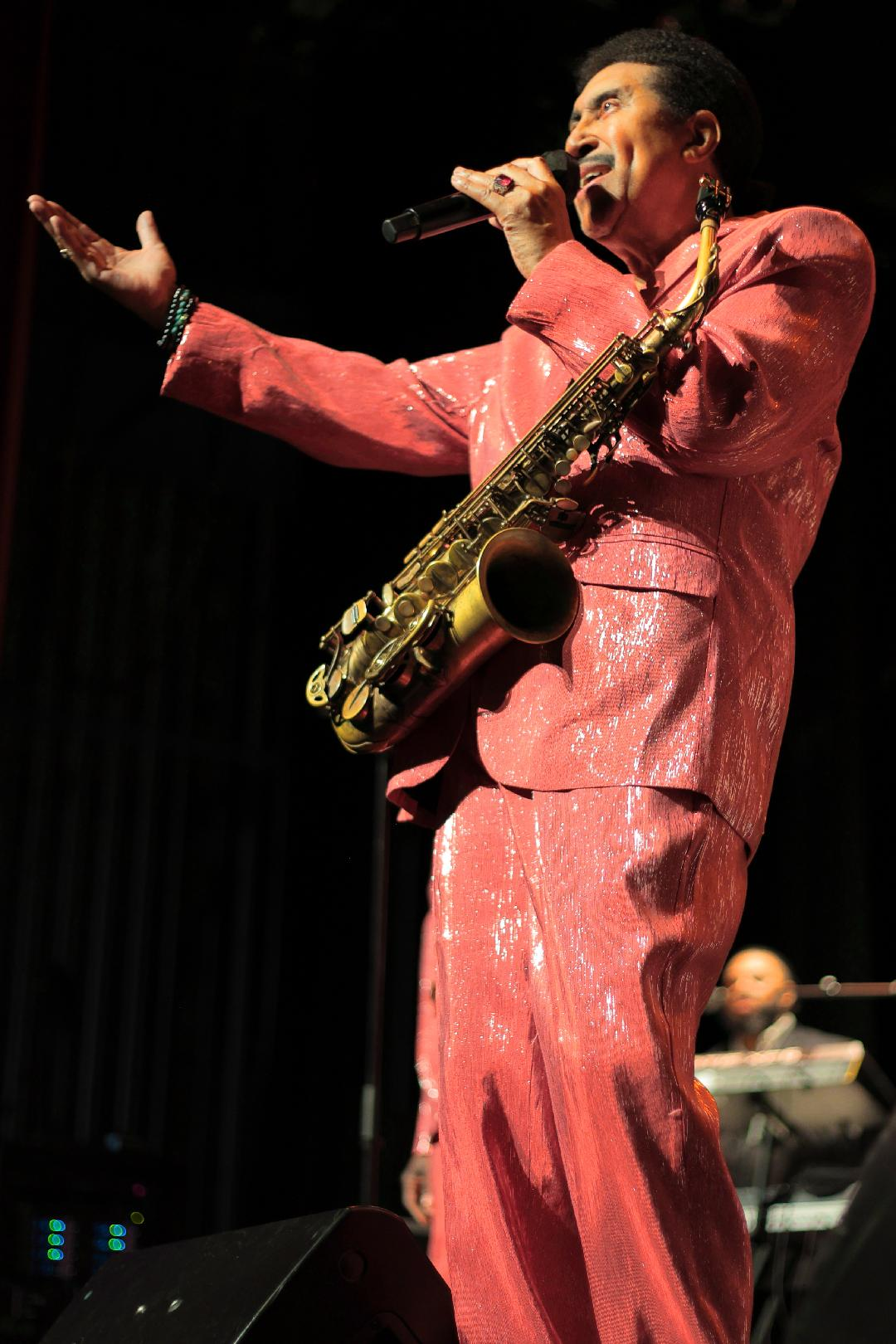
- At Newberry Opera House 03.07.2026

Background information
- Born: Charles Kenneth Knox; January 13, 1952 (age 74); Charleston, West Virginia, U.S.
- Origin: Detroit, Michigan, U.S.
- Occupations: Singer, musician, songwriter
- Instruments: Saxophone, vocals
- Years active: 1968–present
- Website: Chairmen of the Board

Ken Knox (born Charles Kenneth Knox, January 13, 1952) is an American rhythm and blues musician, vocalist and songwriter, who is best known as a member of the soul group, Chairmen of the Board.

== Early years ==
Knox was born in Charleston, West Virginia to Leonard and Virginia Knox. He was one of nine children. The family moved to Detroit, Michigan when Knox was 3 months old. Knox began playing saxophone at age 15. His early influences were Junior Walker, Boots Randolph and King Curtis. His older brother Leonard, who played the sax was his biggest influence. His older sister Betty Knox along with singer Kim Weston were a members of the Gospel group, The Wright Specials, which was under the direction of Gospel singer Rev. James Cleveland. While in High School Knox was part of a touring band. Knox break came when he landed a spot in the band with James Barnes & The Agents, who had a hit in the 60's, entitled, "Free at Last". He also played for The Detroit Emeralds, Ivy Joe Hunter, and Walter (Junie) Morrison.

== Chairmen of the Board ==
Knox met Danny Woods, a member of the band Chairmen of the Board in 1973 and soon after he began to perform with their backing band. Chairmen of the Board's members included, singer songwriter, record producer and front-man of the band, General Johnson, Danny Wood, lead vocalist Harrison Kennedy and Eddie Curtis. They recorded the hit songs, "Give Me Just a Little More Time", and "Pay to the Piper".

In 1974, Kennedy left Chairmen of the Board and by 1976 Johnson moved Knox upfront as part of the group.

By 1978, General Johnson along with Woods and Knox, became a major group on the Beach Music scene on the Stateside of the East Coast.

In 1980, Chairmen of the Board founded Surfside Records based in North Carolina. Knox was vice president.

In 1999, Knox along with Johnson and Wood were inducted into the North Carolina Music Hall of Fame. This unit continued to tour together until 2010.

On October 13, 2010, front-man General Johnson died due to complication from lung cancer.

Knox continued touring with the band members after Johnson's death. Thomas Hunter joined the band in 2010 and Brandon Stevens joined in 2013. They release an album entitled, Words Left Unsaid, in 2017. Co-founding member Danny Woods died on January 12, 2018, at the age of 75. Knox recorded twelve albums with Chairmen of the Board from 1974 through 2017.

As of 2022, Knox, Hunter and Stevens are still performing and continuing the legacy of Chairmen of the Board.

== Personal ==
Knox is married to Stephanie Hodge Knox and he has four children. Knox and his wife reside in York, South Carolina.

== Discography ==
=== Studio albums ===
- 1974 – Skin I'm In
- 1980 – Success
- 1983 – A Gift of Beach Music
- 1987 – Music
- 1990 – Alive and Kickin'
- 1993 – What Goes Around Comes Around
- 2002 – Timeless Volume 1
- 2003 – Timeless Volume 2
- 2005 – All In The Family
- 2006 – Beach Music Anthology
- 2010 – Soul Tapestry
- 2017 – Words Left Unsaid
