= Ruth Copeland =

British singer

- Also known as: Kelly Michaels
- Born: c. 1946 (age 79–80); Consett, Durham, England
- Genres: Pop; folk; funk; soul
- Years active: 1964–1976
- Labels: Invictus; RCA

Ruth Copeland (born c. 1946) is an English former singer, based in the United States since the 1960s and known for her collaborations with George Clinton and Parliament-Funkadelic.

== Biography ==
=== Early life ===
Copeland was born in Consett, County Durham, in the north-east of England, where her father worked for the Consett Iron Company. She grew up in the Blackhill area as a neighbour of musician Freddie 'Fingers' Lee. She attended Consett Grammar School and Consett Technical College, and began singing with a local jazz band, the Collegians, in 1963. After her mother's sudden death and her father's remarriage, she left college to pursue a singing career, first in Blackpool and then in London, where she joined a band, Ed and the Intruders, in which Lee played keyboards.

=== Music career ===
In 1965 she travelled to Detroit, where her sister Norma already lived, and soon began performing in clubs there as a blues and folk singer. As Kelly Michaels, she recorded a single, "Foggy Days" / "I Need Him", for Ollie McLaughlin's Carla label. She also worked as a comptometer operator, and met and married football player Karl Sweetan, though the marriage was short-lived.

After being spotted singing by Edwin Starr, she met and developed a relationship with Motown songwriter and record producer Jeffrey Bowen; they later married. Bowen was involved in setting up Invictus Records with Holland, Dozier and Holland, and Copeland signed a contract with the newly-formed company in 1969. According to Copeland, "their plan was to create another Diana Ross – only white this time." Bowen began producing records for the label, and Copeland became one of the label's first performers (and one of a minority of white artists on the soul-focused label) as a member of the newly signed group The New Play. They released a single "A Gift of Me" / "The Music Box", co-written by "Edith Wayne" (a pseudonym used by Holland, Dozier and Holland), Ron Dunbar, and Copeland. However, it was not successful and the group soon disbanded. Copeland was also asked to write lyrics for a Holland-Dozier-Holland tune, and came up with words about missing her dog in England; the record producers disliked the results, and instead had Ron Dunbar write the words to the song that became the hit "Band of Gold".

==== Collaborations with George Clinton and Parliament-Funkadelic ====
At the same time as Copeland's involvement with Invictus, George Clinton's Parliament was also signed to the label. She became involved with work on the group's debut album, Osmium, and was credited with co-producing the record with Clinton; Bowen also worked on its production but for contractual reasons could not be credited. She also wrote two of the album's tracks: "Little Ole Country Boy" and "The Silent Boatman". These tracks are unusual in Parliament-Funkadelic's catalogue, and show the influence of Copeland's interest in country and British folk music. Copeland said: "I was trying in my naive way to write a protest song with the message that death is the great leveller... I played "The Silent Boatman" on guitar for Brian and Eddie Holland and they liked it – much to my surprise and delight, because it was the first song I wrote by myself."

Alongside her work on Parliament's debut, Copeland also began working on solo material, and her first album, Self Portrait, was released by Invictus in October 1970. The album featured contributions not only from Clinton, but from a range of other Parliament-Funkadelic musicians, including Bernie Worrell, Eddie Hazel, Tawl Ross, Billy Bass Nelson and Tiki Fulwood. It contained a variety of different styles, including folk, funk, and opera, with one track recorded with the Detroit Symphony Orchestra. A second album, I Am What I Am, was released in July 1971, again featuring a range of P-Funk musicians, including several, such as Hazel and Nelson, who had recently left Funkadelic due to financial concerns. These former Funkadelic musicians remained with Copeland as her backing band when she toured to promote her album, and regularly supported Sly and the Family Stone.

Copeland also continued to collaborate with Clinton, co-writing a further two singles for Parliament, "Come in Out of the Rain" and "Breakdown", which were released in 1971–72. Clinton said of her: "She was a good writer, really particular about getting it right, a perfectionist!" The year 1972 also saw Copeland contribute to the self-titled album The Politicians featuring McKinley Jackson. She co-wrote the album's opening track, "Psycha-Soula-Funkadelic", a track subsequently sampled by Brighton-based band The Go! Team, on their 2007 album Proof of Youth. However, both her relationship with Bowen, and her contract with Invictus, ended around this time, and for legal reasons she was unable to record with another company for several years.

Copeland was unable to sustain the success of her initial albums and tours. In September 1972, she supported David Bowie on his US concerts. She recorded her third and final album, Take Me to Baltimore, in Philadelphia in 1976. Released by RCA Records it featured a duet with the record's co-producer Daryl Hall, but was unsuccessful, and shortly afterwards she retired from the music business.

=== Later life ===
She remarried in the late 1970s, and started a new career as a production executive at a publishing firm, The Blue Book Network of Commercial Construction. In the 2010s, after years when her whereabouts were unknown, she re-emerged to give interviews about her earlier music career. Copeland made a brief appearance in the 2025 documentary film Sly Lives! (aka The Burden of Black Genius) discussing her experience with Sly Stone.

== Discography ==
=== Singles ===
- "The Music Box" / "A Gift of Me" (as New Play) (1969)
- "Hare Krishna" / "No Commitment" (1970)
- "Gimme Shelter" / "No Commitment" (1971)
- "Heaven" (Promo single) (1976)
- "Win or Lose" (Promo single) (1976)

=== Albums ===
- Self Portrait (1970, Invictus Records)
- I Am What I Am (1971, Invictus Records)
- Take Me to Baltimore (1976, RCA Records)
