= Antoine Goléa =

French musicologist

Antoine Goléa (real name Siegfried Goldman) (30 August 1906 in Vienna – 12 October 1980 in Paris) was a French musicologist of Romanian origin. He was one of the founding members of the Académie Charles-Cros.

== Biography ==
Antoine Goléa was born in Vienna on 30 August 1906. Having been pushed by his father to become a violinist, he entered the Conservatory of Bucharest at the age of nine, and studied violin under the guidance of Cecilia Nitzulescu, a brilliant and despotic "failed violinist", who initially believed in his talent.

But, after nine years of study, they both have to face the facts: he was not made to be a virtuoso violinist, despite his undeniable gifts, in particular that of the "absolute pitch", and despite the first violin prize which crowned his long years of study. He was then eighteen years old. After three years at the French high school in Bucharest, his parents decided to send him to France to complete his secondary education. He arrived in Montpellier towards the end of the summer of 1928 and, having obtained his bachelor's degree in philosophy and a certificate of higher studies in German, he moved to Paris in October 1929, where he settled for the rest of his life.

Goléa was one of the first participants of the famous radio talk La Tribune des critiques de disques by Armand Panigel, launched in 1947 on RTF (and later on France Musique), alongside Claude Rostand, José Bruyr, and Henri Jacques. Other eminent critics later joined this Tribune, in particular Jacques Bourgeois and Jean Roy.

A columnist at Télérama Diapason, and Témoignage chrétien, he was one of the most important critics of contemporary music, known for his uncompromising stance and passionate defence of serial music, which he has long considered to be the only contemporary music worthy of interest. He also wrote a Histoire du ballet (1967).

Towards the end of his life, however, Goléa was led to somewhat soften his positions. In the last published work of his lifetime (La Musique de la nuit des temps aux aurores nouvelles.), he must recognize that "an even more serious phenomenon has occurred: serial music died of his beautiful death..."

However, Goléa has always been an ardent defender of the music of Debussy, Messiaen, Schoenberg and Boulez, whom he considered to be the true creators of contemporary music, whereas, when asked what a Richard Strauss meant in the evolution of contemporary music, his answer was astounding: "Nothing, very exactly!

He was married to singer Colette Herzog. They are both buried at Cimetière parisien de Bagneux.

Goléa died on 12 October 1980 in Paris.

== Quote ==
Excerpt from an article published in the journal Musica in 1956, and included in his biography Je suis un violoniste raté:

The works of the past which are rightly admired today, the most often played works of the past, are those that, at the time of their birth: 1) brought something new into musical evolution; 2) offended the sensibility of contemporaries; 3) are today marked by an intrinsic value, independent of their place in evolution... Let it be understood, therefore, once and for all: 1) that a work can only please if it is the fruit of genius or, at least, of a very great talent; 2) that nevertheless its permanence is assured only if it also brings something new into musical evolution or, at least, takes into account the last stage of this evolution, which is not yet sclerosed.

== Publications ==
- 1954: Esthétique de la musique contemporaine, PUF
- 1958: Georges Auric, éditions Ventadour
- 1959: Rencontres avec Pierre Boulez, éditions Julliard
- 1960: La Musique dans la société européenne, du Moyen Âge à nos jours, Bibliothèque de l'homme d'action
- 1961: Rencontres avec Olivier Messiaen, éditions Julliard
- 1962: 20 ans de musique contemporaine. De Messiaen à Boulez. De Boulez à l'inconnu, 2 vol.
- 1965: Richard Strauss, Flammarion
- 1967: Entretiens avec Wieland Wagner, éditions Belfond
- 1967: Histoire du ballet, éd. Rencontres
- 1968: Claude Debussy, Seghers
- 1969: Marcel Landowski, Seghers, 1969
- 1977: La Musique, de la nuit des temps aux aurores nouvelles, éditions Alphonse Leduc, 2 vol.
- 1980: Georges Enesco, un grand inconnu, éditions Salabert, 1980
- 1981: Je suis un violoniste raté, éditions Julliard; reissued Belfond, followed by Et après by Jérôme Spycket
- Important chapters in the following collective works: Wagner, Bach, Mozart, Liszt, Berlioz, Debussy, all published in the series Génies et Réalités, éditions Réalités-Hachette
