= Patches (Chairmen of the Board song) =

1970 country soul song

Single by Clarence Carter

from the album Patches
- B-side: "Say It One More Time"; (most countries); "I Can't Leave Your Love Alone"; (UK)
- Released: July 1970
- Recorded: 1970
- Genre: Soul; southern soul; country
- Length: 3:10
- Label: Atlantic
- Songwriters: Ron Dunbar, General Johnson
- Producer: Rick Hall

Clarence Carter singles chronology
"I Can't Leave Your Love Alone" (1970)	"Patches" (1970)	"It's All in Your Mind" (1970)

"Patches" (sometimes known as "Patches (I'm Depending On You)") is a country soul song written by General Johnson and Ron Dunbar and best known in the 1970 hit version by Clarence Carter. It won the 1971 Grammy Award for Best Rhythm & Blues Song.

== Chairmen of the Board ==
The song was written by General Johnson, the lead singer of Chairmen of the Board, with Ron Dunbar, who worked in A&R and record production at the Invictus record label, owned and overseen by Brian Holland, Lamont Dozier, and Eddie Holland, formerly of Motown. Dunbar was often credited with co-writing hit songs at Invictus with "Edyth Wayne", a pseudonym used by Holland-Dozier-Holland during the time when they were in legal dispute with Motown and its music publishing arm Jobete to which they had been contracted.

The song tells a story about a boy born and raised in poverty on a backwoods farm in Alabama by a father who endured much suffering in life; the father dies before the boy is 13, entrusting the boy with the family and estate. The boy is forbidden from quitting school (as the father never could attend), so he must do all of the farm work before and after school so that he and his family have food. The burden is almost too much for the boy, especially after a flood wipes out a crop, but determination not to let his father down, along with his mother's prayers, keep him going. Years later, his mother has died and he and his younger siblings are adults, and he looks back on his father's words as what helped him pull through those hard times.

"Patches" was included on Chairmen of the Board's first album, The Chairmen of the Board (later reissued as Give Me Just a Little More Time), and was the B-side of the group's July 1970 single, "Everything's Tuesday", their third chart hit.

== Clarence Carter ==
The blind blues singer Clarence Carter heard the song, later saying: "I heard it on the Chairmen of the Board LP and liked it, but I had my own ideas about how it should be sung. It was my idea to make the song sound real natural..." Initially he thought "that it would be degrading for a black man to sing a song so redolent of subjugation," but was persuaded to do so by record producer Rick Hall.

Carter recorded the song at the FAME Studios in Muscle Shoals, Alabama, with Hall as producer and musicians including Junior Lowe (guitar), Jesse Boyce (bass), and Freeman Brown (drums). Carter's recording was released in July 1970 and was described by a Billboard reviewer as a "powerful blues item" featuring a "blockbuster vocal work-out." The record rose to No. 4 on the Hot 100, No. 2 on the R&B chart, and No. 2 on the UK singles chart.

Following Carter's success, the song won the 1971 Grammy Award for Best Rhythm & Blues Song for its writers, Johnson and Dunbar.

== Charts ==
=== Weekly charts ===
Clarence Carter

Chart (1970)	Peak position
Australia (Kent Music Report)	10
Canada RPM Top Singles	16
Ireland (IRMA)	4
UK Singles Chart	2
US Billboard Hot 100	4
US Billboard R&B	2
US Cash Box Top 100	1

Ray Griff version

Chart (1970)	Peak position
Canada RPM Country	16
US Billboard Country	26

Jerry Reed cover

Chart (1981)	Peak position
US Billboard Country	30

=== Year-end charts ===
Chart (1970)	Rank
Australia	88
UK	26
US Billboard Hot 100	35
US Cash Box Top 100	48

== Other versions ==
A reggae version was recorded late in 1970 by The Rudies, later known as Greyhound. Another version by Canadian country singer Ray Griff reached #26 on the US country music chart the same year. The song was also recorded by Alabama some time before 1980, Jerry Reed in 1982, and by George Jones and B.B. King on the album Rhythm, Country and Blues in 1994.

Grant Green performed the song during the 1971 live set eventually released on his 2006 album Live at Club Mozambique.

A parody version of the song performed by Joe Cumia, brother of Anthony Cumia of Opie and Anthony fame, titled "Black Earl" was often played on the Ron and Fez show.

=== Marvin ===
"Marvin (Patches)"

Single by Titãs

from the album Go Back
- Released: 1988
- Genre: Rock
- Label: WEA
- Producer: Liminha

Titãs singles chronology
"Família" (1987)	"Marvin (Patches)" (1988)	"Flores" (1989)

In 1984, the song was rewritten and rearranged in Portuguese as "Marvin (Patches)" by the Brazilian band Titãs and released on their self-titled debut album. The idea to adapt the song came from band member Nando Reis, who found out about the song from the cover released by reggae band King Sounds & The Israelites. The new namesake was chosen as a tribute to a recently deceased Marvin Gaye. The new lyrics tell the story of Marvin, a young farmer whose father dies, leaving him responsible for making ends meet for his family. A live version taken off their 1988 live album Go Back was released as their eighth single and a second live version, acoustic and retitled simply as "Marvin", was released on their MTV Unplugged album Acústico MTV, becoming a hit in Brazil.

==== Cover versions ====
- Paulo Ricardo on his 1996 cover album Rock Popular Brasileiro
- Jeito Moleque on their 2005 live album Me Faz Feliz - Ao Vivo
- Biquini Cavadão on a live performance

== See also ==
- List of Cash Box Top 100 number-one singles of 1970
