= Donald Clark Osmond (album) =

Studio album by Donny Osmond
- Released: August 6, 1977
- Recorded: 1977
- Studio: Kolob Studios (Provo)
- Genres: Soul, pop
- Label: Polydor
- Producer: Brian Holland

Donny Osmond chronology
Disco Train (1976)	Donald Clark Osmond (1977)	Donny Osmond (1989)

Singles from Donald Clark Osmond
- 1. "(You've Got Me) Dangling on a String" Released: August 20, 1977

Donald Clark Osmond is the ninth studio album released by Donny Osmond in 1977. "(You've Got Me) Dangling on a String" was released as a single. The album peaked at No. 169 on the Billboard Top LPs chart. "Dangling on a String" reached #109 on the Bubbling Under chart below Billboard's Hot 100.

== Track listing ==
No.	Title	Writer(s)	Length
1.	"I Can't Stand It"	Brian Holland, Eddie Holland, Harold Beatty	2:55
2.	"The More I Live, the More I Love"	B. Holland, E. Holland, Beatty, Marlon Woods	3:20
3.	"Fly Into the Wind"	Donny Osmond	4:10
4.	"You Are the Music in My Life"	B. Holland, Reginald Brown, Richard Davis, Stafford Floyd	3:15
5.	"I Haven't Had a Heartache All Day"	B. Holland, E. Holland, Beatty	3:27
6.	"(You've Got Me) Dangling on a String"	Edythe Wayne, Ron Dunbar	3:00
7.	"I'm Sorry"	Donny Osmond	4:30
8.	"Oh, It Must Be Love"	B. Holland, E. Holland, Beatty	3:00
9.	"I Discovered You, You Discovered Me"	B. Holland, E. Holland, Beatty, Woods	4:20
10.	"You'll Be Glad"	B. Holland, Woods, Brown, Floyd, Dorothy Collins	3:32

== Personnel ==
- Donny Osmond - Main Vocals
- Ben Benay, Greg Poree, Lee Ritenour, Mitch Holder, Thom Rotella - Guitars
- Dan Wyman - Synthesizers
- Ronald Coleman - Keyboards
- John Barnes - Keyboards, Synthesizers
- Tony Newton - Bass
- Ed Greene, James Gadson - Drums
- Bob Zimmitti, Gary Coleman - Percussion
- Eddie "Bongo" Brown, Ollie Brown, Paulinho Da Costa - Congas
