= Harrison Kennedy (musician) =

- Born: March 9, 1942 (age 83); Hamilton, Ontario, Canada
- Genres: Electric blues, R&B, soul blues
- Occupations: Singer-songwriter, guitarist
- Instruments: Vocals, guitar, harmonica, mandolin
- Years active: Late 1960s–present
- Labels: Various including Electro-Fi Records
- Website: harrisonkennedy.ca

Harrison Kennedy (born March 9, 1942) is a Black Canadian electric blues, R&B, and soul blues, singer-songwriter and multi-instrumentalist. He is best known for being the lead vocalist on the Chairmen of the Board song, "Chairman of the Board", but has had a varied solo career since the mid-1970s. He was awarded the 2016 "Blues Album of the Year" Juno Award for his release, This Is From Here. It was Kennedy's sixth nomination for that Award. He is also a Blues Music Award, and multiple Maple Blues Award nominee.

== Life and career ==
Harrison Kennedy was born and raised in Hamilton, Ontario, Canada. His family had roots in New Orleans and Tennessee,. Kennedy sang in the Stewart Memorial Church Choir as a boy, when childhood trips took him over the border to visit relations in Arkansas, Rogersville, Tennessee, and Detroit, Illinois, United States, and all these experiences expanded his love of music. in 1974

Kennedy relocated to Detroit and joined the Chairmen of the Board in 1970, a group started as part of the then newly created Holland–Dozier–Holland record labels, Invictus Records and Hot Wax Records. Kennedy played on the recording of Marvin Gaye's 1971 song, "What's Going On". Following a string of hit records with Chairmen of the Board, which included "Give Me Just a Little More Time", "(You've Got Me) Dangling on a String", and "Everything's Tuesday", Kennedy left in 1974 and set out on a solo career. Kennedy served as a corporal with the RHLI and later worked for Allied Chemical Corporation.

Over the years on a part-time basis he played a variety of musical genres including funk, soul, R&B, folk, rock, and gospel. Kennedy spent almost 30 years outside of the music industry, before returning as a blues singer and guitarist with 2003's Sweet Taste. In 2007, Kennedy signed a new recording contract with Electro-Fi Records and has since released a number of internationally acclaimed albums. In 2008, Kennedy was nominated for Best Blues Recording in Canada's Juno Awards. He separately achieved second place against 83 others in the solo/duo category at the 2011 International Blues Challenge. In 2013 he also overcame a spell of prostate cancer.

In 2013 he released Soulscape, on which he played a variety of instruments, which was followed by the Juno winning album, This Is From Here. It featured Colin Linden on several tracks, from a total of six of which Kennedy wrote. The album has also won the Grand Prix du Disque for Blues award from the Académie Charles Cros in France, as the 2015 Blues Album of the Year. Harrison toured in late 2014 with Ruthie Foster, Eric Bibb and Jerome Michael Brown. He also appeared as a guest performer on Bibb's 2014 album, Blues People. He participated in 2018 with Jean-Jacques Milteau and Vincent Segal on the recording of Crossborder Blues, published by Naïve. In 2017, this group commenced a tour.

== Discography ==
=== Albums ===
Year	Title	Record label
1972	Hypnotic Music	Invictus Records
1989	Live in the Eye	The Independent Label
2003	Sweet Taste	N/K
2005	Voice + Story	Black & Tan Records
2007	High Country Blues	Electro-Fi Records
2009	One Dog Barkin'	Electro-Fi Records
2011	Shame the Devil	Electro-Fi Records
2013	Soulscape	Electro-Fi Records
2014	This Is From Here	Electro-Fi Records
2018	CrossBorder Blues	Electro-Fi Records
2022	Thanks for Tomorrow	Electro-Fi Records

== See also ==
- List of electric blues musicians
- Canadian blues
