= The Showmen =

American singing group formed in 1961

The Showmen were a New Orleans–based American doo-wop and R&B group formed in 1961. They are best remembered for their track "It Will Stand", issued on Minit Records. "It Will Stand" (Minit 632) reached No. 61 on the Billboard Hot 100 in 1961, and when re-released in 1964 (Imperial 66033) re-charted and reached No. 80. "It Will Stand" was a favorite of Neil Sedaka, who was inspired to set his original arrangement of "Breaking Up Is Hard to Do" to a similar beat. They had another hit, the Carolina Beach Music standard "39-21-40 Shape;" the label on the single, however, was mistakenly printed "39-21-46", and this soon supplanted the official title.

Unlike the majority of musicians that recorded for New Orleans record labels controlled by Joe Banashak, the Showmen were not from that locality. They all came from Norfolk, Virginia, moving to New Orleans in May 1961 and April 1962, to record fifteen titles under the studio supervision of Allen Toussaint.

General Norman Johnson, at the age of twelve, formed the group the Humdingers that would eventually become the Showmen. In the late 1950s, Noah Biggs began managing the Humdingers. He sent a demo to Banashak. The songs on the demo were "The Owl Sees You", "For You My Darling", "Skinny McGinny" and "I Go On Loving You". Banashak arranged for Toussaint to record the Humdingers.

"Our Love Will Grow" on Swan Records became a Northern soul track, listed as number 382 on the Northern Soul All Time Top 500.

In 1968 Johnson amicably left the group, to begin his association with Holland–Dozier–Holland's Invictus Records. He became leader of the group Chairmen of the Board.

The Showmen (once managed by the now deceased Johnson) presently consists of Warren Brown, Rubin Collick, Michael Spratley, and Bill Talley.

== Original members ==
- General Norman Johnson – lead singer
- Milton "Smokes" Wells – bass vocals
- Dorsey "Chops" Knight – second tenor
- Gene "Cheater" Knight – first tenor
- Leslie "Fat Boy" Felton – baritone (died 2014)
- Frank Owens – drums
- Gordon Banks – (musician)
- Randall "Bootney" Wilkins – bass guitar (died 13 August 1979)
