= Carolina Girls =

Single by General Johnson & the Chairmen of the Board

from the album Success
- Released: 1980
- Genre: Beach, soul
- Length: 3:22
- Label: Surfside
- Songwriter: J.D. Shropshire Jr.

Carolina Girls is a song written by J.D. Shropshire Jr. (November 14, 1942 – February 24, 2001). During the time the song was written in 1973, he was going to college at a Barber School in Raleigh, North Carolina. Neither he nor any of his family members ever received any money from his song.

The song was recorded by General Johnson and the Chairmen of the Board in 1980 for their album Success. It was released as a single by Surfside Records and topped the Beach Music chart, although it failed to make the pop chart. The song has persisted over the years to become a part of the North and South Carolina culture and remains a radio and live performance favorite. The song was later recorded by other artists. The song also inspired the book Carolina Girls by Steven Brown.

In an interview with Blues Critic, Danny Woods of chairman of the Board was asked if "Carolina girls really are the best" and explains:

Well the song was actually originally written by: J.D. Shropshire Jr. from Forest City, North Carolina and when I first came here (The Carolinas) there was no style. You know you had the New York girls, California girls and they all got the attention. Even songs about them. And that just made Carolina girls feel like nothing but there's quite a difference between Carolina girls now and then. Their self-esteem just magnified after that song."

Fellow Chairman Ken Knox followed up:

Girls became prideful. High schools and colleges use that song. Marching bands play "Carolina Girls". It's on T-shirts and we're glad about that. It's the all-time biggest Carolina beach song now.
