= I Am What I Am (Ruth Copeland album) =

Studio album by Ruth Copeland
- Released: 1971
- Recorded: 1971
- Genre: Psychedelic soul; gospel; funk
- Length: 41:27
- Label: Invictus
- Producer: Ruth Copeland

Ruth Copeland chronology
Self Portrait (1970)	I Am What I Am (1971)	Take Me to Baltimore (1976)

Professional ratings
Review scores
Source	Rating
Allmusic	3/5 stars

I Am What I Am is the second album by English singer Ruth Copeland. The album was released by Invictus Records in 1971 and was produced and arranged by Ruth Copeland, though it is widely believed that the actual producer of the album was her then husband Jeffrey Bowen. As with her debut, Self Portrait, I Am What I Am contains contributions from George Clinton and the musicians from Parliament-Funkadelic, as well as local Detroit session players such as guitarist Ray Monette.

In 1996, Ruth Copeland's first two albums were licensed by HDH Inc. and reissued by P-Vine Records individually. In 1997 these albums were reissued on one CD under the juxtaposed title Self Portrait/I Am What I Am (Deepbeats DEEPM 022). It was then issued under the title Gimme Shelter - The Invictus Sessions (Castle Music CMRCD 576). Both compilations omitted the track "Un Bel Di (One Fine Day)". The two (complete) albums, plus bonus single mixes of some of the songs, were released in a two-disc set by Edsel records in October 2009.

== Track listing ==
1. "The Medal" (Ruth Copeland, Donald Charles Baldwin)
2. "Crying Has Made Me Stronger" (Ruth Copeland, George Clinton)
3. "Hare Krishna" (Ruth Copeland, George Clinton) (released as a single-Invictus Is 9088)
4. "Suburban Family Lament" (Ruth Copeland, Eddie Hazel)
5. "Play with Fire" (Mick Jagger, Keith Richards)
6. "Don't You Wish You Had (What You Had When You Had It?)" (Ruth Copeland, George Clinton)
7. "Gimme Shelter" (Mick Jagger, Keith Richards)

== Personnel ==
- Ruth Copeland - vocals, backing vocals, arrangements
- Billy Bass Nelson, Dawn Hatcher - bass
- Eddie Hazel, Ron Bykowski, Ray Monette - guitar
- Tiki Fulwood - drums
- Bernie Worrell, David Case - piano, organ

Technical

- Barney Perkins - engineer
