= C Cat Trance =

English post-punk band

- Origin: Nottingham, England
- Genres: Post-punk
- Years active: 1983–1993
- Labels: Red Flame, Ink
- Spinoff of: Medium Medium
- Past members: John Rees Lewis; Nigel Kingston Stone; Mark Walker; Dave Walker; John Thompson; Kev Sanderson; Trev Naylor; Pete Clark; Steve Mitchell; Steve Harvey

C Cat Trance were a post-punk band from Nottingham, England, formed by John Rees Lewis after his departure from Medium Medium. They released five albums before splitting up in the mid-1990s.

== History ==
After leaving Medium Medium, Rees Lewis formed C Cat Trance with original Medium Medium drummer Nigel Kingston Stone. While similar in some respects to Medium Medium, they incorporated World music elements, releasing a self-titled debut mini-LP in 1983 on the Red Flame label. Subsequent releases were on the Red Flame sub-label Ink, starting with the "Dreams of Leaving" 12-inch single. They released one album a year between 1985 and 1987 and another in 1992 before splitting up.

John Rees Lewis later returned to a reformed Medium Medium.

Cherry Red released a collection of the band's best material in 2005.

In August 2024, the label confirmed the death of Rees Lewis, describing him as "a master of fusing elements of synth pop, electronic, tribal rhythms, post-punk and psychedelia".

== Discography ==
=== Albums ===
- C Cat Trance (1983), Red Flame
- Khamu (She Sleep Walks) (1985), Ink 6
- Zouave (1986), Ink
- Play Masenko Combo (1987), Ink
- Les Invisibles (1992), Ink

Compilations

- Karadara: The Cream of C Cat Trance (2005), Cherry Red
- Screaming Ghosts (2017), Emotional Rescue/Malka Tuti

=== Singles ===
- "Dreams of Living/(You've Got Me) Dangling on a String" (1984), Ink
- "She Steals Cars" (1985), Ink
- "Shake the Mind" (1986), Ink
- "Screaming (To Be With You)" (1986), Ink
- "Ishta Bil Habul (Cream Galore!)" (1987), Ink
- "Yinniya" (1988), Ink
- "Hobb" (1993), t:me
