= Take Me to Baltimore =

Studio album by Ruth Copeland
- Released: 1976
- Recorded: 1976
- Label: RCA
- Producer: Ralph Moss; Daryl Hall

Ruth Copeland chronology
I Am What I Am (1971)	Take Me to Baltimore (1976)

Take Me to Baltimore is the third and final studio album to date by English singer Ruth Copeland. It was her only album released on RCA Records in 1976 and it was produced by Ralph Moss and her RCA labelmate Daryl Hall of Hall & Oates. As of 2026, it is out of print. The rights are held with Sony Music Entertainment.

== Track listing ==
Side One

1. "Win Or Lose" (Jesse Rae)
2. "Milky Way Man" (Daryl Hall, Ruth Copeland)
3. "Oh Baby" (Howard Harris, Ruth Copeland)
4. "Here You Come Again" (Eric Thorngren, John Turi, Ruth Copeland, William Hocher)
5. "Cliches" (Eric Thorngren, Ruth Copeland)

Side Two

1. "Heaven" (Daryl Hall, Ruth Copeland)
2. "Take Me to Baltimore" (Dick Wagner, Ruth Copeland)
3. "Some Hearts Need to Sing The Blues" (John Turi, Ruth Copeland)
4. "If You Don't Want My Love" (Eric Thorngren, John Turi, Ruth Copeland)
5. "Senses" (Eric Thorngren)

== Personnel ==
- Ruth Copeland – vocals
- Bob Kulick, Dick Wagner, Eric Thorngren – guitar
- Francisco Centeno – bass
- John Turi, Ralph Schuckett – keyboards
- Steve Jordan – drums
- Jimmy Maelen – percussion
- Michael Brecker, Randy Brecker – horns
- Robin Kenyatta – alto saxophone, flute
- Jesse Rae, William Hocher – backing vocals
- Patrick Adams – string and horn arrangements

Technical

- Frankie D'Augusta, Ralph Moss – engineer
