= Medium Medium =

English post-punk band

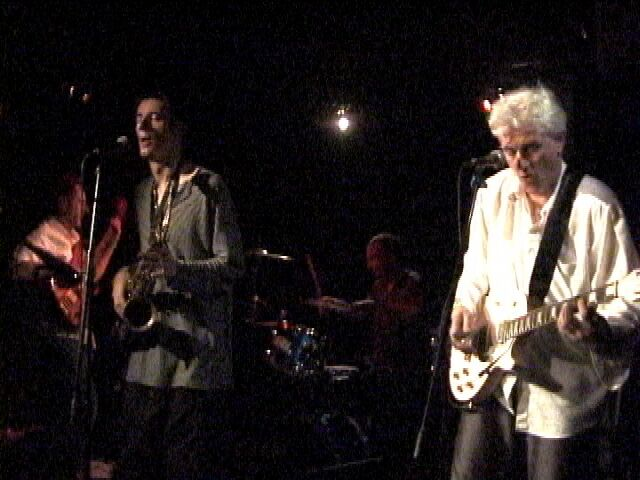
- Medium Medium in 2004

Background information
- Origin: Nottingham, England
- Genres: Dance-punk; post-punk; funk
- Years active: 1978–1983, 2004–
- Label: Cherry Red Records
- Members: John Rees Lewis; Alan Turton; Andy Ryder; Steve Harvey
- Past members: Nigel Stone; Graham Spink; Leslie Joachim Barrett; Julie Wood
- Website: http://www.mediummedium.com

Medium Medium was a post-punk band from Nottingham, England, initially active between 1978 and 1983.

== History ==
Emerging in 1978 out of the Nottingham punk/rhythm & blues band The Press, Medium Medium's first single was "Them or Me", which was released in late 1978 and was still selling well enough in 1980 to appear in the UK Independent Chart. The second single, "Hungry, So Angry", was released in February 1981 on Cherry Red Records. One of the first records to introduce slap bass - a technique borrowed from black funk music - to a generally white audience, "Hungry, So Angry" reached #48 in the Billboard Disco chart - the single and the album were released in 1981 on the New York-based indie label Cachalot Records - and has appeared on over a dozen compilations over the years.

The band released one studio album, The Glitterhouse, in late 1981. Its stark, stripped-down dub and dance rhythms and chiming, funk guitar with occasional saxophone and other sounds, failed to attract a large following.

John Rees Lewis, the lead singer and saxophone player, left at the start of 1982 to form C Cat Trance with the original drummer Nigel Stone, who had left shortly before the release of "Hungry, So Angry". The remaining members, Andy Ryder (guitar/vocals), Alan Turton (bass guitar), Graham Spink (offstage special sounds) and the replacement drummer Steve Harvey, continued to tour and were later augmented by, first, Leslie Joachim Barrett (guitar/keyboards), then Julie Wood (keyboards). Forays into a fuller, more produced sound failed to earn the band a new record deal and Medium Medium split up in late 1983.

Inspired by a Cherry Red retrospective CD release in 2001 and the subsequent dance-punk revival, Medium Medium reformed in late 2004 for several live shows, including a showcase at the CMJ Music Marathon in New York. No longer a full-time venture, the band has stated plans to continue to write, record and perform.

In 2010, Medium Medium released a split-LP with Kommissar Hjuler on the German label Der Schoene-Hjuler-Memorial-Fond, containing tracks from their concert at Part Time Punks Festival USA, followed by a second split-LP in 2011.

The band's "The Glitterhouse" was reissued in expanded form as a triple vinyl edition in 2016 by Optic Nerve Recordings.

== Discography ==
=== Albums ===
- The Glitterhouse (1981), Cherry Red
- Live in Holland (1988), Trance
- Hungry, So Angry (2001), Cherry Red - compilation
- Fluxus and Funk (2010), split-LP with Kommissar Hjuler on (SHMF)
- Fluxus and Funk 2 (2011), split-LP with Kommissar Hjuler on (SHMF) with cover art by Clayton Patterson

=== Singles ===
- "Them or Me" (1978), Apt - UK Indie #42
- "Hungry, So Angry" (1981), Cherry Red - 7-inch single
- "Hungry, So Angry" (1981), Cherry Red - 12-inch single, released six months later
- "If You Touched Her She'd Smear" (1982), Intercord
- "Splendid Isolation" (1982), Intercord
