= Strokin' =

Single by Clarence Carter

from the album Dr C.C.
- B-side: "Dr. C.C.'"
- Released: 1986
- Genre: Synth-funk; soul
- Length: 4:37 (short version): 6:23 (long and dirty version)
- Label: Ichiban
- Songwriter: Clarence Carter

Clarence Carter singles chronology
"Messin' with My Mind" (1985)	"Strokin'" (1986)	"G-Spot" (1990)

"Strokin'" is a song written and performed by Clarence Carter, featured on the 1986 album Dr. C.C. It remained on the New Zealand music charts for 46 weeks and reached #2 in the 1990 Year-end chart.

"Strokin'" was reputedly deemed too ribald for a public release or radio play, so the record company placed the records in jukeboxes, where bar patrons discovered the song. "Strokin'" was given further acclaim when it was used in the Eddie Murphy remake of The Nutty Professor. It was later used in William Friedkin's film Killer Joe.

== Charts ==
Chart (1987)	Peak position
Jet's Top 20 Singles	6

Chart (1988)	Peak position
Australia (ARIA)	24
Canadian Dance	1
UK Singles (Official Charts)	82
UK Dance	31

Chart (1989)	Peak position
Australia Dance (DMI)	6
Import Dance Sales (AUS)	1
New Zealand (Recorded Music NZ)	2

Chart (1997)	Peak position
US Hot R&B/Hip-Hop Songs (Billboard)	124

"Still Strokin'" - Priority One
Chart (1990)	Peak position
New Zealand (Recorded Music NZ)	20

=== Year-end charts ===
Chart (1988)	Position
Canada Dance (RPM)	5

Chart (1989)	Position
Import Dance Sales (AUS)	1
New Zealand (Recorded Music NZ)	50

Chart (1990)	Position
New Zealand (Recorded Music NZ)	2

=== All-time charts ===
All-time chart performance for "Strokin'"
Chart (1989–2023)	Position
New Zealand (Recorded Music NZ)	44

Chart (2023)	Position
The 100 Best Pop Songs Never to Hit the Hot 100 (Billboard)	79

== Certifications ==
Region	Certification	Certified units/sales
Canada (Music Canada)	Platinum	100,000^{^}
New Zealand (RMNZ)	Platinum	10,000^{*}
United States (RIAA)	Platinum	1,000,000^{^}
^{*} Sales figures based on certification alone.^{^} Shipments figures based on certification alone.
