= The Glitterhouse =

Studio album by Medium Medium
- Released: 1981
- Label: Cherry Red

The Glitterhouse is the sole studio album by English post-punk band Medium Medium, released in 1981 by record label Cherry Red. "Hungry So Angry" was released as a single.

== Reception ==
Professional ratings
Review scores
Source	Rating
Robert Christgau	B

Trouser Press' review was negative, opining that it "uses too much aural gimmickry and tends to meander aimlessly". The New York Times wrote that "most of the album is airy, moody, strangely gripping psychedelic rock-jazz, with guitar and saxophone textures grating against each other in an echo-chamber and a beat that's more implied than stated."
