= (You've Got Me) Dangling on a String =

Single by Chairmen of the Board

from the album Chairmen of the Board
- B-side: "I'll Come Crawling"
- Released: April 1970
- Studio: HDH Studios, Detroit, Michigan
- Genre: Pop-soul
- Length: 3:00
- Songwriters: Ronald Dunbar and Edythe Wayne

Chairmen of the Board singles chronology
"Give Me Just a Little More Time" (1970)	"(You've Got Me) Dangling on a String" (1970)	"Everything's Tuesday" (1970)

"(You've Got Me) Dangling on a String" is a 1970 soul music song by the Chairmen of the Board. The single reached No. 38 on the US Billboard Hot 100, No. 19 on the US Billboard R&B chart, and No. 5 on the UK Singles Chart. Ronald Dunbar and Edythe Wayne wrote the song.

== Live performances ==
The group performed "Dangling on a String" on American Bandstand on May 16, 1970.

== Chart history ==
Chairmen of the Board

Chart (1970)	Peak position
Canada RPM Top Singles	58
UK (The Official Charts Company)	5
U.S. Billboard Hot 100	38
U.S. Billboard Best Selling Soul Singles	19
U.S. Cash Box Top 100	30

Donny Osmond

Chart (1977)	Peak position
U.S. Billboard Bubbling Under the Hot 100	109
U.S. Cash Box	99

== Cover versions ==
- The song was covered by Donny Osmond, and released as a single from the August 1977 album Donald Clark Osmond, "bubbling under" the Billboard Hot 100 chart at number 109. Catalogue number PD 14417, Int'l. # 2066 847 77 NP 2827. It was produced by Brian Holland.
- A version with substantially altered music was also recorded by the UK post-punk band C Cat Trance, on their album Play Masenko Combo and as the B-side of their 1984 single "Dreams Of Leaving" (Ink INK123).
- In 1988, "Danglin' on a String" was also covered by Boys Club for their eponymous debut album and released as their third and final single, in 1989, on MCA Records (MCA-53649).
