= Jacques Bourgeois =

French musicologist

Jacques Bourgeois (1912 – 30 August 1996 in Paris) was a 20th-century French musicologist.

During the Second World War, Jacques Bourgeois participated in the Resistance as leader of the MNPGD (Mouvement national des prisonniers de guerre et déportés) - Northern Zone. In 1943, he worked with François Mitterrand's network, who suspected him of being a double agent for the Gestapo, along with his friend Albert Médina. He even considered liquidating them, but refrained from doing so for lack of evidence. In September 1944, after the Liberation of Paris, he was arrested and interrogated by Edgar Morin and Dionys Mascolo. But he was found innocent by Philippe Dechartre. He continued his career as a musicographer and music critic until his death in 1996. (Source: Mitterrand par Philip Short.)

He was one of the participants in the famous radio program La Tribune des critiques de disques by Armand Panigel on France Musique, along with Antoine Goléa and Jean Roy in particular. He was also artistic director of the Chorégies d'Orange and producer of the radio program Jeunes Chanteurs de demain on France Musique.

== Works ==
- 1976: Richard Wagner, Paris, Éditions D'aujourd'hui
- 1978: Giuseppe Verdi, Paris, Éditions Julliard
- 1982: L'Opéra : des origines à demain, Julliard
