= Everything's Tuesday =

Single by Chairmen of the Board
- B-side: Patches (US); Bless You (UK)
- Released: 1970
- Genre: Soul
- Length: 2:49
- Label: Invictus Records
- Songwriters: Holland-Dozier-Holland, Daphne Dumas, Ron Dunbar
- Producer: Holland-Dozier-Holland

Chairmen of the Board singles chronology
"Pay to the Piper" (1970)	"Everything's Tuesday" (1970)	"Working on a Building of Love" (1971)

"Everything's Tuesday" is a song, written by Holland-Dozier-Holland (using the pseudonym Edyth Wayne) with Daphne Dumas and Ron Dunbar. When released as a single, performed by American group Chairmen of the Board and produced by Holland-Dozier-Holland, it was a hit.

== Chart performance ==
It was first released in 1970 in the US with "Patches" as the B-side, reaching 38 on the Billboard Hot 100. That same year, it reached the top 5, peaking at number 4 on the weekly chart of flagship Canadian CHUM AM radio station in Toronto. It entered the UK Singles Chart in February 1971 with a B-side of "Bless You", reaching number 12 and staying for nine weeks on the chart.
