= Grand Prix du Disque for Blues =

The Grand Prix du Disque for Blues is awarded by l'Académie Charles Cros.

== Winners ==
The following is a partial list of winners:

- 2002 Mighty Mo Rodgers Red, White and Blues
- 2003 Buddy Guy for Blues Singers
- 2004 Doctor John for N'Awlinz disdat or d'udda.

== See also ==
Grand Prix du Disque
