= Armand Panigel =

French musician and critic (1920–1995)

Armand Panigel (15 October 1920 in Bursa, Ottoman Empire – 28 December 1995 in Saint-Rémy-de-Provence aged 75) was a French musicologist and film critic. He was also a historical figure of French radio and television in the fields of classical music and cinema.

== Early life ==
After studying at the French high school in Cairo, he studied law and mathematics at the University of Montpellier.

== Career ==
He began his career as radio and film producer in Cairo from 1939 to 1944.

He became a well-known radio man in the 1950s. He created, produced and hosted on France Musique the flagship radio show La Tribune des critiques de disques from 1946 to 1984 (in particular with Antoine Goléa, Jacques Bourgeois and Jean Roy), as well as other broadcasts.

From 1947 to 1964, he founded and directed the magazine Disques, a review of classical records. At the time, UNESCO commissioned him with indexing, with a view to publishing catalogues, all existing recordings of certain composers, starting with Bach, Beethoven and Chopin. In 1946, he became the founding vice-president of the Académie Charles-Cros.

Panigel worked for French television, as music producer, film director and television presenter for numerous programs: notably Au cinéma ce soir, which presented a film preceded by a montage of news from the time of its release, and L'Histoire du cinéma français par ceux qui l'ont fait, which gathered interviews with French directors who were his contemporaries; but also Cinéma-Variations, Ce jour-là, j'en témoigne : chroniques du temps de l'ombre 1940-44 (Histoire de la Résistance) and Portraits de cinéastes et de musiciens (1964–82).

In 1985, he created the Armand Panigel Foundation in Saint-Rémy-de-Provence, a group of scholarship specialists in his favourite fields and concerned by the transmission of the memory of the great interpretations of the past, thus sharing 60 years of its private collections: more than 200,000 classical records, 40,000 films and 160,000 books on music and cinema.

He also pursued a career as a publisher, notably as director of series at Régie-Cassette-Vidéo, where he established la Mémoire du cinéma, and founding director of Rééditions d'enregistrements du domaine public (LPs) of classical music, dedicated to la Mémoire de la musique.

Panigel worked as chairman and chief executive officer of "Éditions et impressions de la Cinématographie française (1962–64)", président of the Commission d'avances sur recettes du cinéma (1975–76), Member of the Board of Directors of the association des auteurs de films, Director of collections of classical music CDs (1993–95).

His career was rewarded with his promotion to the rank of officer of the Ordre des Arts et des Lettres.

He was the author of several reference books on music and cinema. In 1994, fascinated by new technologies, he began producing and directing CD-ROMs, "because it is a three-dimensional work, combining sound, image and text: it is the dream of my life," he declared to the AFP one year before his death. He is buried in Saint-Rémy-de-Provence Cemetery.

== Publications ==
- Le Guide français du disque (Éd. de la Revue Disques, 1948)
- L'Œuvre de Frédéric Chopin (Éd. de la Revue Disques, Archives de la Musique enregistrée UNESCO, 1949)
- Catalogue général des disques microsillons (Éd. de la Revue Disques, 1958–64)
- Index de la cinématographie française (Éd. La Cinématographie française, 1964)
- Les Écrits de S. M. Eisenstein : le cinéma, son sens, sa forme on livres-cinema.info, (adaptation from Russian and American, Christian Bourgois éditeur, ISBN 978-2-267-00047-4, 1975)
