= Chairmen of the Board =

American-Canadian soul band

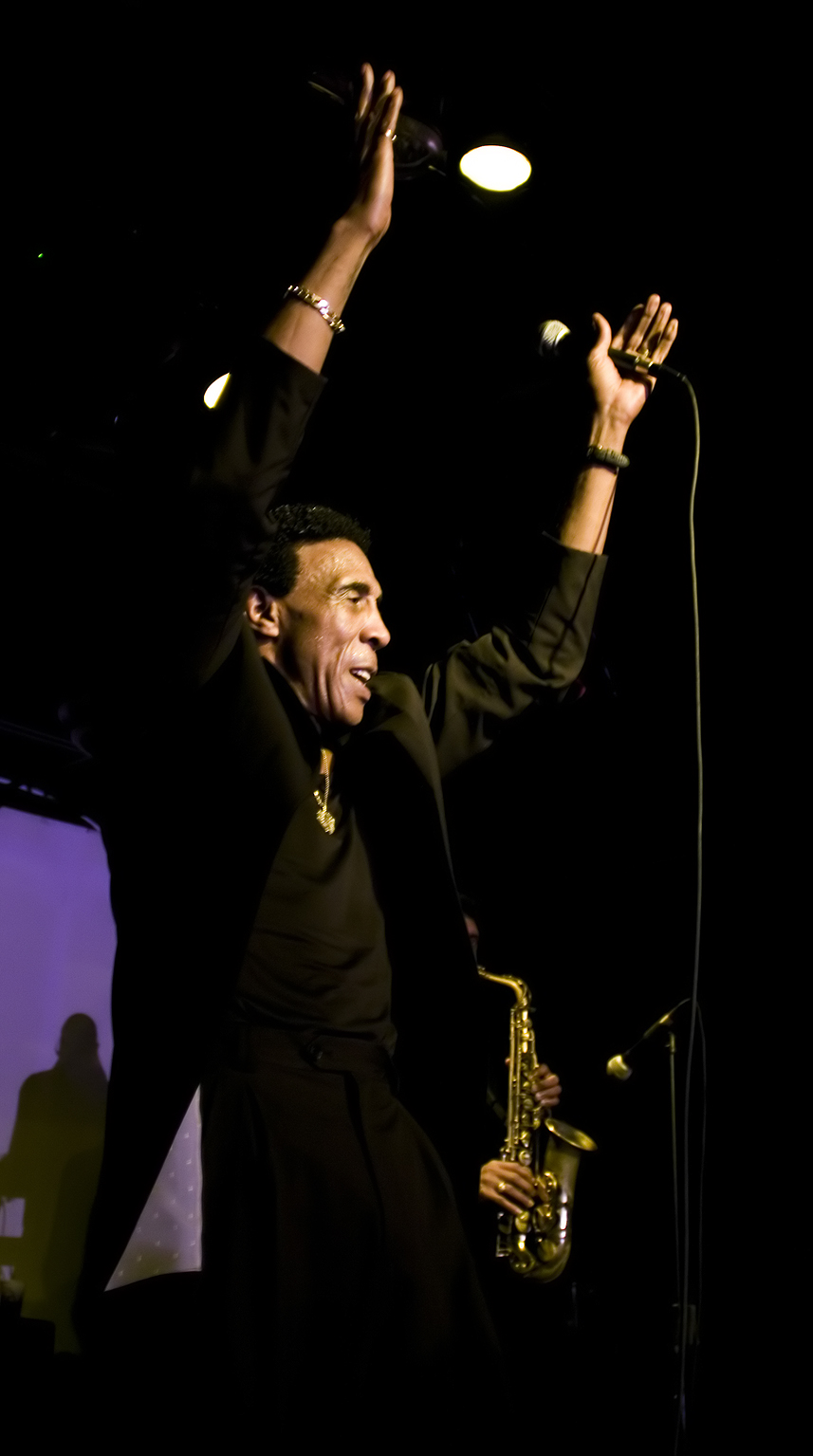
- Chairmen of the Board's General Norman Johnson in 2007

Background information
- Origin: Detroit, Michigan, United States
- Genres: Soul
- Years active: 1967–present
- Labels: Invictus, Surfside Records, MoPhilly
- Members: Ken Knox; Thomas Hunter; Patrick McGuire
- Past members: General Johnson; Eddie Custis; Harrison Kennedy; Danny Woods; Darryl Johnson; Brandon Stevens
- Website: thechairmenoftheboard.com

Chairmen of the Board are an American-Canadian soul music group, based in Detroit, Michigan, who saw their greatest commercial success in the 1970s.

== Recording career ==
General Johnson (1941–2010) had a hit as the lead singer of The Showmen in the early 1960s, with the New Orleans rock and roll anthem "It Will Stand" and Carolina Beach classic "39-21-40 Shape".

When Holland-Dozier-Holland left Motown in 1967 to establish their own Invictus/Hot Wax group of record labels, they teamed Johnson up with Eddie Custis, Danny Woods and Canadian-born Harrison Kennedy as the new company's flagship act, under the name Chairmen of the Board. Custis left the group after their second album.

Although they all had a turn at lead vocals, it was Johnson's quirky hiccup-laden style and his songwriting that became increasingly showcased, with the group selling a million plus copies of their single, "Give Me Just a Little More Time". The disc was released in December 1969, reached number three on the US Billboard Hot 100, with one million sales confirmed in May 1970, when the group were presented with a Gold record by the RIAA. Chairmen of the Board also charted with "(You've Got Me) Dangling on a String", "Everything's Tuesday", "Pay to the Piper", "Finders Keepers" and (in the UK) "Working on a Building of Love" and "Elmo James". They also recorded the original version of "Patches", co-written by Johnson, which became a 1970 hit for Clarence Carter. The song received a Grammy Award in 1971.

Kennedy, Woods and Johnson all went on to record solo albums, whilst Johnson wrote and produced (with Greg Perry) for other Invictus/Hot Wax acts, notably Honey Cone. Kennedy having left, Johnson and Woods toured the UK in 1976 with six musicians as Chairmen of the Board. The final night of the tour was at Middleton Civic Hall on March 11, 1976. The act was broken up immediately afterwards, Johnson having signed for Arista Records as a solo artist.

In 1978, Johnson reformed the Chairmen of the Board along with Danny Woods and Ken Knox. In 1980, the new Chairmen founded Surfside Records and began recording beach music. The group remained popular on the beach scene, and Surfside Records released material as an independent record label based in Charlotte, North Carolina, through the 1990s.

The Chairmen of the Board (General Johnson, Danny Woods and Ken Knox) were inducted into the North Carolina Music Hall of Fame in 1999. General Johnson continued to perform with Woods and Knox as the Chairmen of the Board until Johnson's death from lung cancer in 2010.

In 2012, Chairmen of the Board released a single, "You", which was written and produced by Knox. In 2013, former member Harrison Kennedy was nominated for a Blues Music Award in the Acoustic Artist category.

Danny Woods (born Daniel Woods Jr. on March 27, 1942 in Atlanta, Georgia) died on January 12, 2018, at the age of 75.

In 2021, Chairmen of the Board partnered with producer Wheeler del Torro to bring a new, modern edge to their sound. Del Torro assembled group of remixers, including Severino Panzetta (Horse Meat Disco, Beating Cells) and Doug Gomez to remix a new single, "Reach Out".

== Discography ==
=== Albums ===
Year	Album	Peak chart positions	
Year	Album	US BB	US R&B
1970	The Chairmen of the Board ^{1}	133	27
1970	In Session	117	16
1972	Bittersweet	178	—
1973	Greatest Hits ^{2}	—	—
1974	Skin I'm In	—	52
1980	Success	—	—
1983	A Gift of Beach Music	—	—
1987	The Music	—	—
1990	Alive and Kickin'	—	—
1993	What Goes Around Comes Around	—	—
2006	Beach Music Anthology	—	—
"—" denotes releases that did not chart.
Notes: 1. Reissued as Give Me Just a Little More Time; 2. UK only release

=== Singles ===
Year	A-side / B-side	Album	Peak chart positions			
Year	A-side / B-side	Album	US Hot 100	US R&B	AUS	UK
1970	"Give Me Just a Little More Time"/ "Since the Days of Pigtails"	The Chairmen of the Board	3	8	90	3
1970	"(You've Got Me) Dangling on a String"/ "I'll Come Crawling"	The Chairmen of the Board	38	19	—	5
1970	"Everything's Tuesday"/ "Patches"	In Session	38	14	—	12
1971	"Pay to the Piper"/ "Bless You"	In Session	13	4	67	34
1971	"Chairman of the Board"/ "When Will She Tell Me She Needs Me"	In Session	42	10	—	48
1971	"Hanging On to a Memory"/ "Tricked and Trapped"	In Session	—	28	—	—
1971	"Try On My Love for Size"/ "Working on a Building of Love"	—N/a	—	48 —	—	20
1971	"Men Are Getting Scarce"/ "Bravo, Hooray"	Bittersweet	—	33	—	—
1972	"Everybody's Got a Song to Sing"/ "Working on a Building of Love"	—N/a	—	30 —	—	—
1972	"Elmo James"/ "Bittersweet"	Bittersweet	—	—	—	21
1972	"I'm On My Way to a Better Place"/ "So Glad You're Mine"	Fresh	—	—	—	30
1973	"Finders Keepers"/ "Finders Keepers" (Instrumental)	Skin I'm In	59	7	—	21
1974	"Everybody Party All Night"/ "Morning Glory" (Instrumental)	Skin I'm In	—	80	—	—
1976	"You've Got Extra Added Power in Your Love"/ "Someone Just Like You" (credited as Chairmen of the Board featuring Prince Harold)	—N/a	—	—	—	—
1980	"Carolina Girls" (credited as General Johnson and the Chairmen of the Board)	Success	—	—	—	—
1986	"Lover Boy" (credited as General Johnson and the Chairmen of the Board)	The Music	—	—	—	56
2012	"You" (as Chairmen of the Board)	—N/a	—	—	—	—
"—" denotes releases that did not chart.

== Bibliography ==
- The Illustrated Encyclopaedia of Black Music - Salamandar Books - ISBN 0-86101-145-7
