= Académie Charles Cros =

French music and recording industry association

The Académie Charles Cros (Charles Cros Academy) is an organization located in Chézy-sur-Marne, France, that acts as an intermediary between government cultural policy makers and professionals in music and the recording industry.

The academy is composed of fifty members specializing in music criticism, sound recording, and culture. It was founded in 1947 by Roger Vincent with Armand Panigel, José Bruyr, Antoine Goléa, Franck Ténot, and Pierre Brive – critics and recording specialists - and led by musicologist Marc Pincherle. It was named in honor of Charles Cros (1842–1888), inventor and poet (friend of Arthur Rimbaud and Paul Verlaine) who was one of the pioneers of sound recording.

The academy continues to stay abreast of advances in technology, from the development of 78 RPM gramophone records to CDs, DVDs, playable torrents and all other readable, transportable music formats available today.

== Awards ==
Each year since 1948, the Academy has given out its grand prize, the Grand Prix du Disque, to recognize outstanding achievements in recorded music and musical scholarship. Prizes are awarded in the field of popular song, classical music, jazz, and other categories of recorded music, as well as for outstanding books of musicology. Categories vary from year to year, and multiple awards are often made in one category in the same year.

=== Categories ===
- Ancient Music
- Baroque Music
- Blues
- Chamber Music
- Choral Music
- First Recital
- French Song
- Instrumental and Symphonic Music
- Instrumental Soloist (new talent)
- Jazz
- Lyric Music
- Modern Music
- Opera
- Recordings for Children
- Vocal Soloist (new talent)
- World Music

== In popular culture ==
In 1969, Jimi Hendrix was the recipient of the Popular Music Prize in the 1969 Academie Charles Cros Awards.
