= The Glass House (group) =

American musical group

The Glass House was an American R&B/soul group from Detroit, Michigan.

The Glass House was an assembly of house musicians put together by Holland-Dozier-Holland for their Invictus Records label in 1969. The group was led by Ty Hunter, and included Scherrie Payne, sister of singer Freda Payne.

They released two albums, Inside the Glass House and Thanks I Needed That, and had a string of chart hits through 1972, although the biggest success came with their debut single, 1969's "Crumbs Off the Table".

In June 1971, the Blossoms sued Invictus Records, Stage Coach Productions, Edward J. Holland Jr., and Capitol Records, claiming "the defendants released an Invictus single record, 'Touch Me Jesus', and credited the performers as being 'The Glass House', when, in fact, the Blossoms actually recorded the single."

Within a year, as chart success continued to wane, Invictus dissolved the group.

Shortly thereafter, Hunter and Payne signed on with Motown. Ty became part of the Originals, while Scherrie joined the Supremes.

== Members ==
- Ty Hunter
- Scherrie Payne
- Sylvia Smith
- Larry Mitchell
- Pearl Jones

== Discography ==
=== Albums ===
- Inside the Glass House (1971), Invictus
- Thanks I Needed That (1972), Invictus

=== Singles ===
Year	Title	Chart Positions	
Year	Title	U.S. Pop Singles	U.S. R&B
1969	"Crumbs off the Table"	59	7
1970	"I Can't Be You (You Can't Be Me)"	90	33
1970	"Stealing Moments from Another Woman's Life"	121	42
1971	"If It Ain't Love, It Don't Matter"	-	42
1971	"Touch Me Jesus"	-	-
1971	"Look What We've Done to Love"	101	31
1972	"Playing Games"	-	-
1972	"Giving Up the Ring"	-	-
1972	"VIP"	-	-
1972	"Thanks, I Needed That"	-	47
