= Give Me Just a Little More Time =

1970 single by Chairmen of the Board

Single by Chairmen of the Board

from the album The Chairmen of the Board
- B-side: "Since the Days of Pigtails & Fairytales"
- Released: January 1970
- Recorded: 1969
- Studio: HDH Studios, Detroit, Michigan
- Genre: Soul
- Length: 2:40
- Label: Invictus
- Songwriters: Edythe Wayne; Ron Dunbar
- Producer: Holland-Dozier-Holland

Chairmen of the Board singles chronology
| "Give Me Just a Little More Time" (1970) | "(You've Got Me) Dangling on a String" (1970) |

"Give Me Just a Little More Time" is the debut single by American-Canadian soul music group Chairmen of the Board, released in 1970 through Capitol Records on Holland–Dozier–Holland's Invictus Records label.

"Give Me Just a Little More Time", backed with "Since the Days of Pigtails & Fairytales", peaked at No. 3 on the Billboard Hot 100 in the United States, making it the best-performing of the Chairmen's singles, and the first of the Chairmen's four Billboard Hot 100 top 40 pop hits. The single also peaked at No. 8 on the Billboard R&B Singles chart. It sold more than one million copies in the US. In the United Kingdom, the song reached No. 3 on the UK Singles Chart in September 1970. The first Chairmen of the Board LP, a self-titled release, included the single; after the single's success, the Chairmen of the Board album was reissued as Give Me Just a Little More Time.

== Background ==
The song was written and produced by Brian Holland, Lamont Dozier, Edward Holland, Jr., and Ron Dunbar. Because of the then still-pending lawsuit against Holland-Dozier-Holland from their former employers, Motown, the trio credited themselves with the pseudonym "Edythe Wayne" for this song and many other early Invictus/Hot Wax releases.

"Give Me Just a Little More Time" features Chairmen of the Board lead singer General Johnson as the narrator, (backed by group members Danny Woods, Harrison Kennedy and Eddie Custis) begging a sweetheart not to rush intimacy: "We both want the sweetness in life/ But these things don't come overnight." Members of Motown's in-house band, The Funk Brothers, who played all of Holland-Dozier-Holland's previous hits, played on this recording as well as many other Invictus/Hot Wax productions.

== Charts ==
=== Weekly charts ===
| Chart (1970) | Peak position |
|---|---|
| Canada Top Singles (RPM) | 9 |
| UK Singles (OCC) | 3 |
| US Billboard Hot 100 | 3 |
| US R&B (Billboard) | 8 |
| US Cash Box Top 100 | 9 |

=== Year-end charts ===
| Chart (1970) | Rank |
|---|---|
| UK | 31 |
| US Billboard Hot 100 | 39 |
| US R&B (Billboard) | 41 |
| US Cash Box Top 100 | 92 |

== Certifications ==
| Region | Certification | Certified units/sales |
|---|---|---|
| United States (RIAA) | Gold | 1,000,000^{^} |
^{^} Shipments figures based on certification alone.

== Legacy ==
According to the book, Sh-Boom! The Explosion of Rock 'n' Roll (1953-1968) by Clay Cole, "Give Me Just a Little More Time" is one of the songs that has exploited beach music and kept it alive through the decades.

== Kylie Minogue version ==
"Give Me Just a Little More Time"

Single by Kylie Minogue

from the album Let's Get to It
- B-side: "Do You Dare?"
- Released: January 13, 1992
- Genre: Pop
- Length: 3:07
- Label: Mushroom; PWL
- Songwriters: Edythe Wayne; Ron Dunbar
- Producers: Mike Stock; Pete Waterman

Kylie Minogue singles chronology
| "Keep on Pumpin' It" (1991) | "Give Me Just a Little More Time" (1992) | "Finer Feelings" (1992) |

Music video
- "Give Me Just a Little More Time" on YouTube

"Give Me Just a Little More Time" was covered in 1992 by Australian pop singer Kylie Minogue. Minogue's version was featured in a then-current commercial for Accurist watches. It was one of the last tracks to be recorded for her fourth album, Let's Get to It (1991). It peaked at number two on the UK Singles Chart, assisted by its techno oriented B-side "Do You Dare?" and sold 325,000 copies.

"Give Me Just a Little More Time" was later added to Minogue's 1992 compilation album Greatest Hits. Additionally, it is the only song from Let's Get to It to be included on Minogue's career-spanning compilations Ultimate Kylie, The Best of Kylie Minogue and the standard version of Step Back in Time: The Definitive Collection. "Give Me Just a Little More Time" was performed in various television shows at the time of release, but it was not included on the Let's Get to It Tour. The first performance of the song in a tour would be on the Anti Tour in 2012. The B-side "Do You Dare?" was included on Minogue's Greatest Remixes (Vol. 2), and was mixed on the "Everything Taboo" medley on her Showgirl: The Greatest Hits Tour, Showgirl: The Homecoming Tour, and For You, for Me concert tours. Pete Waterman stated:

I went to bed, and, and I literally was in bed thinking of all these records that I had in my life [...] I was going through the library mentally thinking, what song would she never have done that we could do that was just a great song. And one of my favorite songs was Chairman of the Board's "Give Me Just a Little More Time."

He ran downstairs to his record label to find the track. The song was played to Minogue the next morning.

=== Critical reception ===
Betty Page from NME wrote, "Indeed, she makes a highly passable stab at the beseeching Chairmen of the Board classic 'Give Me Just a Little More Time', and even gets to do a ballad with just an acoustic guitar for help." In 2023, Robert Moran of Australian daily tabloid newspaper The Sydney Morning Herald ranked the song as Minogue's 166th best song (out of 183), adding that "no one needs this".

=== Track listings ===
These are the formats and track listings of major single releases of "Give Me Just a Little More Time".

- UK CD single (PWCD212)
1. "Give Me Just a Little More Time" – 3:07
2. "Give Me Just a Little More Time" (Extended Version) – 4:33
3. "Do You Dare?" (NRG Mix) – 7:04
4. "Do You Dare?" (New Rave Mix) – 6:40
- UK 7-inch vinyl single (PWL212)
1. "Give Me Just a Little More Time" – 3:07
2. "Do You Dare?" (NRG Edit) – 3:17
- UK 12-inch vinyl single (PWLT212)
1. "Give Me Just a Little More Time" (Extended Version) – 4:33
2. "Do You Dare?" (NRG Mix) – 7:04
3. "Do You Dare?" (New Rave Mix) – 6:40
- 2009 UK iTunes bundle & 2018 digital EP
1. "Give Me Just a Little More Time" – 3:07
2. "Give Me Just a Little More Time" (Extended Version) – 4:33
3. "Give Me Just a Little More Time" (Instrumental) – 3:05
4. "Give Me Just a Little More Time" (Backing Track) – 3:06
5. "Do You Dare?" (NRG Mix) – 7:04
6. "Do You Dare?" (New Rave Mix) – 6:40
7. "Do You Dare?" (Italia 12" Mix) – 5:22
8. "Do You Dare?" (NRG Edit) – 3:17
9. "Do You Dare?" (New Rave Instrumental) – 6:38

=== Charts ===
==== Weekly charts ====
| Chart (1992) | Peak position |
|---|---|
| Australia (ARIA) | 24 |
| Belgium (Ultratop 50 Flanders) | 13 |
| Europe (Eurochart Hot 100) | 9 |
| Germany (GfK) | 51 |
| Ireland (IRMA) | 6 |
| Netherlands (Dutch Top 40 Tipparade) | 12 |
| Netherlands (Single Top 100) | 60 |
| UK Singles (Official Charts) | 2 |
| UK Airplay (Music Week) | 5 |

==== Year-end charts ====
| Chart (1992) | Position |
|---|---|
| Belgium (Ultratop) | 92 |
| UK Singles (OCC) | 50 |
| UK Airplay (Music Week) | 51 |

=== Sales ===
| Region | Certification | Certified units/sales |
|---|---|---|
| United Kingdom | — | 325,000 |

=== Release history ===
| Region | Date | Format(s) | Label(s) | Ref. |
|---|---|---|---|---|
| United Kingdom | January 13, 1992 | —N/a | PWL | |
| Japan | February 21, 1992 | CD | PWL | |
| Australia | March 30, 1992 | 12-inch vinyl; CD; cassette | Mushroom | |

== Other versions ==
- In 1982, American R&B singer Angela Clemmons covered the song which peaked at No. 4 on Billboard's Dance/Disco Top 80 singles chart.
