= Tawl Ross =

American musician (1948–2024)

Lucius "Tawl" Ross
- Born: Lucius Ross; October 5, 1948; Wagram, North Carolina, U.S.
- Died: January 3, 2024 (aged 75)
- Genres: Funk; soul; psychedelic rock; psychedelic soul
- Instrument: Guitar
- Years active: Late 1960s-early 1970s, mid 1990s
- Labels: Westbound, Coconut Grove
- Formerly of: Funkadelic

Lucius "Tawl" Ross (October 5, 1948 – January 3, 2024) was an American musician. He was the rhythm guitarist for Funkadelic from 1968 to 1971, and played on their first three albums. He left the band in 1971 soon after a debilitating experience mixing LSD with Speed, which is reported to have resulted in brain damage. He moved back home to North Carolina and dropped out of the music scene, but resurfaced in 1995 after a nearly 25-year absence to release a solo album, a.k.a. Detrimental Vasoline - Giant Shirley, issued by Coconut Grove Records under the name Tal Ross.

Ross died on January 3, 2024, at the age of 75. His death was reported on the official Facebook page of George Clinton and Parliament Funkadelic.
