= Ty Hunter =

American R&B singer (1940–1981)

- Born: Tyrone Hunter; July 14, 1940; Detroit, Michigan, U.S.
- Died: February 24, 1981 (aged 40) Los Angeles, California, U.S.
- Genres: R&B; soul
- Occupation: Singer
- Instrument: Vocals
- Labels: Anna; Chess

Tyrone "Ty" Hunter (July 14, 1940 – February 24, 1981) was an American R&B singer best known for his work with the Originals and his solo work.

== Biography ==
Born in Detroit, Michigan, he formed the Counts at Mackenzie High School. His bandmates were Leon Ware, Lamont Dozier, Gene Dyer, and Kenny Johnson. The group later changed their name to the Romeos, and the group later evolved as a trio. They recorded two singles for Fox Records in 1957, and briefly for Atco Records, however they disbanded later. He joined the Voice Masters, and his bandmates were Dozier and David Ruffin. They secured a recording deal with Gwen Gordy Fuqua's Anna Records, with a single, "Benny the Skinny Man", however it did not chart. In 1961, the group disbanded after Dozier left to join Motown, and when Anna Records merged with Motown. Hunter and the Voice Masters had a hit with "Everything About You" in 1960, which peaked at No. 18 on the R&B charts. Another single, "Free", peaked at No. 110 on the Bubbling Under chart. He had another hit in 1962 with "Lonely Baby", which peaked at No. 22 on the R&B charts. After that, he joined the Glass House, who scored a hit with "Crumbs Off the Table". By 1971, he joined the Originals. At the same time, Scherrie Payne, who was a member, joined the Supremes.

== Personal life and death ==
Ty had a son, Ty Hunter Jr., who followed his path of music.

Hunter remained in Los Angeles in the remaining years of his life. He died on February 24, 1981 at UCLA Medical Center in Los Angeles, California of lung cancer. His wife preceded him in death, and he was survived by his son. His memorial service was held in Detroit.
