= Clarence Carter =

American singer-songwriter (1936–2026)

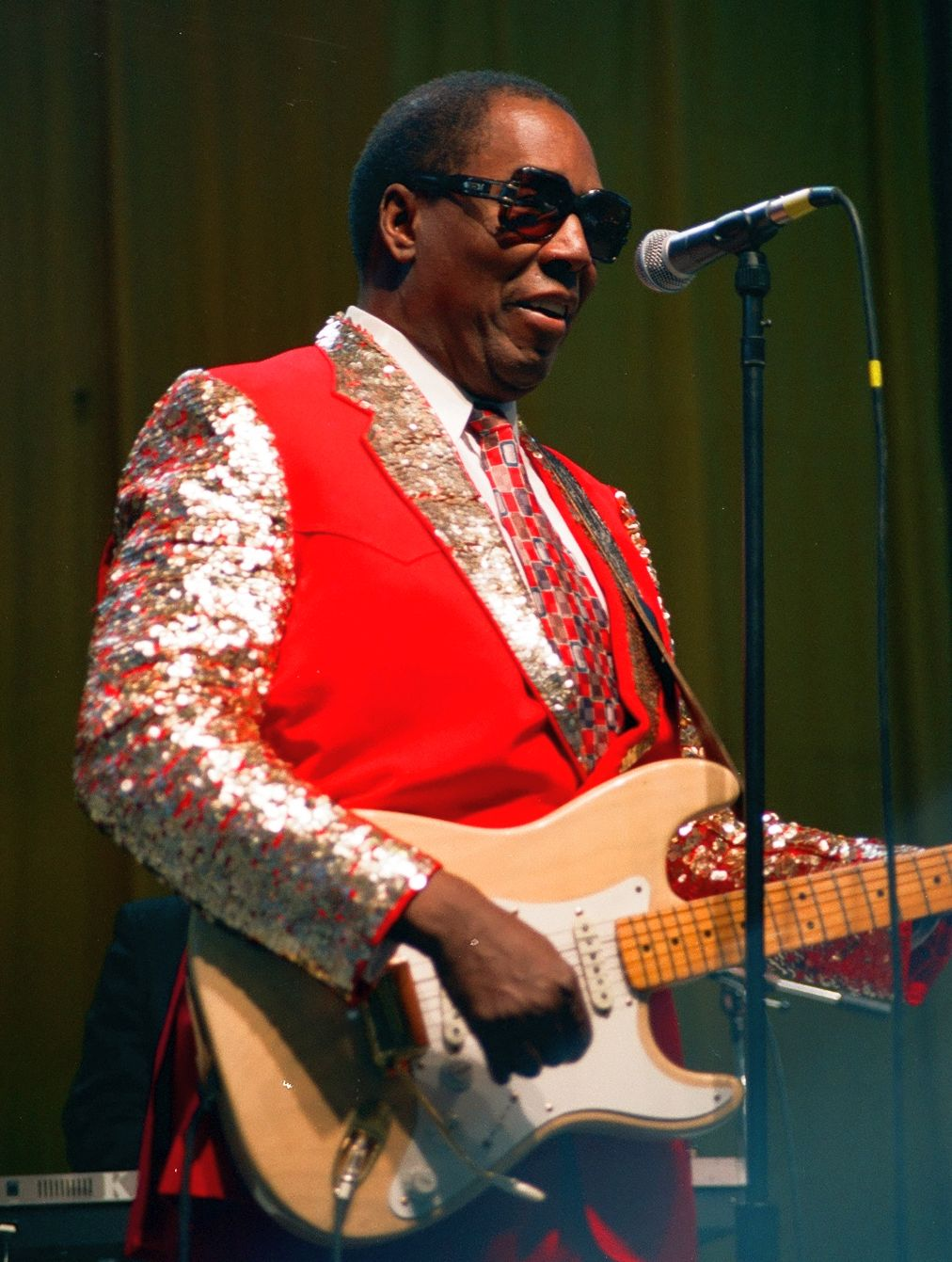
- Carter performing in 1995

Background information
- Born: Clarence George Carter; January 14, 1936; Montgomery, Alabama, U.S.
- Died: May 13, 2026 (aged 90) Atlanta, Georgia, U.S.
- Education: Alabama School for the Blind; Alabama State University (BSc)
- Genres: R&B; soul
- Occupations: Singer; songwriter; musician; record producer
- Instruments: Vocals; guitar
- Years active: 1962–2026
- Labels: Fairlane; Duke; Atlantic; Fame; Ichiban

Clarence George Carter (January 14, 1936 – May 13, 2026) was an American singer, songwriter, musician, and record producer. His most successful songs include "Slip Away", "Back Door Santa" (both released 1968), "Patches" (1970), and "Strokin'" (1986).

== Early life ==
Born blind in Montgomery, Alabama, on January 14, 1936, Carter attended the Alabama School for the Blind in Talladega, Alabama, and Alabama State University in Montgomery, graduating in August 1960 with a Bachelor of Science degree in music.

== Career ==
His professional music career began with friend Calvin Scott, signing to the Fairlane label to release "I Wanna Dance But I Don't Know How", as Calvin and Clarence, the following year. After the 1962 release of "I Don't Know (School Girl)", the pair joined Duke Records, renamed themselves the C & C Boys and released four singles for the label, though none were commercially successful. In 1965, the duo recorded "Step by Step" at Rick Hall's FAME Studios in Muscle Shoals; it was released on the Atlantic Records' subsidiary Atco label, but it also failed to chart.

The duo performed regularly in clubs in Birmingham, Alabama, in 1966. After Scott was seriously injured in an auto accident, Carter continued as a solo singer, and recorded for the Fame label. In 1967 he recorded "Tell Daddy", which reached number 35 on the Billboard R&B chart and inspired Etta James's answer record, "Tell Mama", for which Carter was credited as writer. At the end of 1967, Carter joined Atlantic Records. He then began a string of hits on the R&B and pop charts, starting with "Slip Away" (number 2 R&B, number 6 pop), which has been described as "a superior cheating ballad spotlighting his anguished, massive baritone alongside the remarkably sinuous backing of Fame's exemplary backing band", and "Too Weak to Fight" (number 3 R&B, number 13 pop). Both of the preceding Atlantic singles were certified Gold by the Recording Industry Association of America. At the end of 1968, he had a seasonal pop hit with the raunchy and funky "Back Door Santa" (number 4 Christmas pop), and toured nationally. His backing singers included Candi Staton; they married in 1970 and had a son together, Clarence Carter Jr., before divorcing in 1973.

Carter continued to have hits in 1969 and 1970, with "Snatching It Back", "The Feeling Is Right", "Doin' Our Thing", and "I Can't Leave Your Love Alone" all reaching both the U.S. pop and R&B charts. The B-side of "Snatching It Back" was a remake of a remake of James Carr's "The Dark End of the Street", titled "Making Love (At the Dark End of the Street)". Carter's biggest hit came in 1970 with his version of "Patches", first recorded by Chairmen of the Board, which was a UK number 2 hit and a U.S. number 4. The record sold more than one million copies, and received a gold disc awarded by the R.I.A.A. in September 1970, just two months after its release, and won the Grammy Award for Best R&B Song in 1971. Following "Slip Away" and "Too Weak to Fight", it was Carter's third million-seller. However, Carter's later record releases were less successful, and he left Atlantic at the end of 1971 to rejoin the Fame label. In 1975 he signed to ABC Records, releasing three albums including Loneliness and Temptation. According to writer Brian Ward, Carter "virtually made a career from tales of unbridled love and illicit sex..."

With the advent of disco in the mid-1970s, Carter's career suffered. 1981 saw the birth of another son, Herbert Deon Wilkerson. Then, in 1985, he signed with Ichiban Records and found a new audience beginning with 1986's Dr. C.C. album and its singles "Strokin'" and the title track. "Strokin'" was reputedly deemed too ribald for a public release or radio play, so the record company placed the records in jukeboxes, where bar patrons discovered the song. "Strokin'" was included in the Eddie Murphy remake of The Nutty Professor and in William Friedkin's film Killer Joe. The horn break from "Back Door Santa" was sampled in the Run-D.M.C. Christmas song "Christmas in Hollis".

Carter's later songs continue to appeal to a primarily African-American working-class audience that is also interested in contemporary blues artists such as Denise LaSalle, Bobby Rush, Marvin Sease and Sir Charles Jones. He continued to record and released six albums for the Ichiban label from 1986 on. Carter also established his own Cee Gee Entertainment label. He also continued to tour regularly in the Southern states and internationally.

== Death ==
Carter died at a hospice facility in Atlanta, Georgia, of complications from pneumonia on May 13, 2026, at the age of 90. He had also been recently diagnosed with prostate cancer.

== Discography ==
=== Studio albums ===
Year	Album	Chart positions	
Year	Album	US	US R&B
1968	This Is Clarence Carter	200	49
1969	The Dynamic Clarence Carter	169	22
1969	Testifyin'	138	35
1970	Patches	44	18
1973	Sixty Minutes with Clarence Carter	—	41
1974	Real	—	—
1975	Loneliness & Temptation	—	58
1976	A Heart Full of Song	—	—
1980	Let's Burn	189	28
1981	Mr. Clarence Carter in Person	—	—
1982	Love Me with a Feeling	—	—
1984	Singing for My Supper	—	—
1985	Messin' with My Mind	—	—
1986	Dr. C.C.	—	20
1987	Hooked on Love	—	34
1989	Touch of Blues	—	52
1990	Between a Rock and a Hard Place	—	48
1992	Have You Met Clarence Carter...Yet?	—	73
1995	I Couldn't Refuse	—	—
1996	Carter's Corner	—	—
1999	Bring It to Me	—	—
2011	Sing Along with Clarence Carter	—	—
"—" denotes releases that did not chart.

=== Compilation and live albums ===
- 1971 That's What Your Love Means to Me
- 1977 I Got Caught Making Love
- 1991 Dr. CC's Greatest Prescriptions: The Best Of
- 1994 Live with the Dr.
- 1995 Together Again
- 1997 Too Weak to Fight
- 2001 Live in Johannesburg
- 2003 All Y'all Feeling Alright
- 2005 One More Hit
- 2007 The Final Stroke
- 2007 I'm Easy
- 2009 On Your Feet
- 2010 A Christmas Party
- 2015 Dance to the Blues
- 2020 Mr. Old School

=== Singles ===
Year	Single	Chart positions					Certifications
Year	Single	US Pop	US R&B	AUS	UK	CAN	Certifications
1967	"Tell Daddy"	—	35	—	—	—	
1967	"Thread the Needle"	98	38	—	—	—	
1968	"Looking for a Fox"	62	20	—	—	—	
1968	"Slip Away" / "Funky Fever"	6; 88	2; 49	—	— —	12; 85	RIAA: Gold
1968	"Too Weak to Fight"	13	3	—	—	14	RIAA: Gold
1968	"Back Door Santa"	4 (Note: One week at number 4 on separate Christmas chart)	—	—	—	—	
1969	"Snatching It Back"	31	4	—	—	11	
1969	"The Feeling Is Right"	65	9	—	—	30	
1969	"Doin' Our Thing"	46	9	—	—	37	
1970	"Take It Off Him and Put It on Me"	94	23	—	—	—	
1970	"I Can't Leave Your Love Alone"	42	6	—	—	—	
1970	"Patches"	4	2	10	2	16	RIAA: Gold
1970	"It's All in Your Mind"	51	13	—	—	—	
1971	"The Court Room"	61	12	—	—	—	
1971	"Slipped, Tripped and Fell in Love"	84	25	—	—	—	
1971	"Scratch My Back (And Mumble in My Ear)"	—	41	—	—	—	
1972	"Back in Your Arms"	—	46	—	—	—	
1973	"Put on Your Shoes and Walk"	112	40	—	—	—	
1973	"Sixty Minute Man" / "Mother-in-Law"	65; 80	17; 24	—	— —	— —	
1973	"I'm the Midnight Special"	101	15	—	—	—	
1975	"I Got Caught"	—	49	—	—	—	
1981	"It's a Monster Thang"	—	81	—	—	—	
1986	"Strokin'"	—	—	24	82	—	
"—" denotes releases that did not chart or were not released in that territory.
