= Jean Roy (music critic) =

French music critic and musicologist

Jean Roy (1916 – 22 September 2011) was a French music critic and musicologist, born in Paris.

== Career ==
In 1946, with Armand Panigel, Jean Roy was among the co-founders of the radio program la Tribune des critiques de disques for the RTF then France Musique, a journalist for La Revue musicale of Henry Prunières, for Diapason then le Monde de la musique, secretary of the annual magazine Cahiers Maurice Ravel, whose number 14 of 2011 was dedicated to him. He was vice-president of the "Amis de Francis Poulenc", president of the "Amis de Darius Milhaud", and president of the "Roger Désormière committee".

== Publications ==
- 1954: La Vie de Berlioz racontée par Berlioz, Paris, Éditions Julliard, BnF 31800323c.
- 1962: Présences contemporaines : musique française, Nouvelles Éditions Debresse, BnF 37438700h.
- 1964: Francis Poulenc, Paris, Seghers, BnF 374390673.
- 1968: Darius Milhaud, Seghers, BnF 37439847p.
- 1983: Bizet, Paris, Éditions du Seuil, Collections Microcosme "Solfèges" n°40, 192 p. ISBN 2-02-006512-6.
- 1986: Maurice Ravel : Lettres à Roland-Manuel et à sa famille, Quimper, Calligrammes, (edition, preface and notes by Jean Roy)
- 1989: Ravel d'après Ravel suivi de Rencontres avec Vlado Perlemuter, éditions Alinéa
- 1994: Le Groupe des Six, Le Seuil, 1994, ISBN 978-2-02-013701-0.
- 1997: Samson François, le poète du piano, éditions Josette Lyon, ISBN 2906757853.
- Jean Roy (1999). L'intemporel Robert Casadesus : Pianiste et compositeur (in French). Paris: Buchet/Chastel. p. 121. ISBN 2-28-301799-8. (book with a CD)
