= General Johnson (musician) =

American singer-songwriter

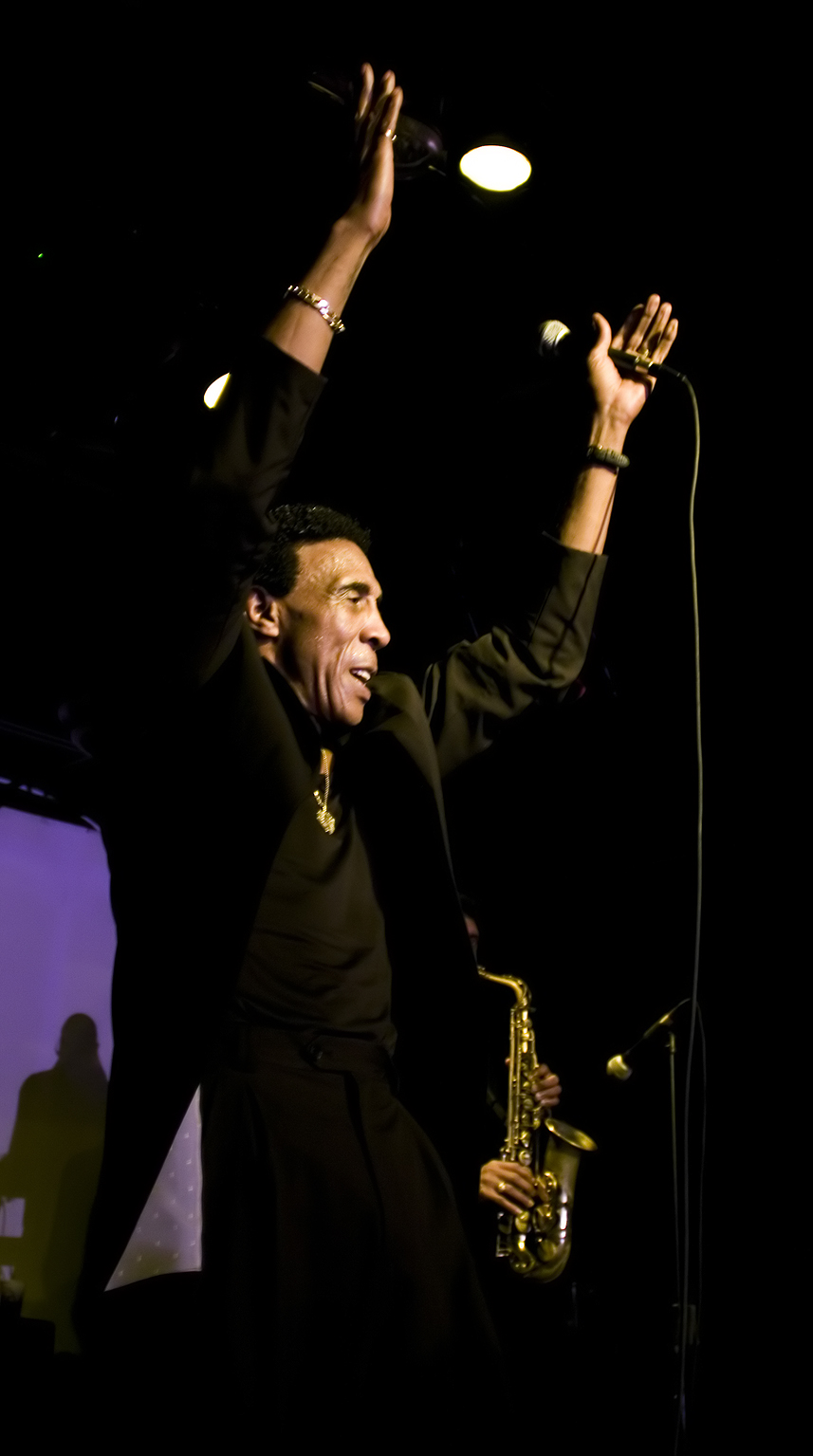
- Johnson in 2007

Background information
- Born: General Norman Johnson; May 23, 1941; Norfolk, Virginia, U.S.
- Origin: Huntersville, Virginia
- Died: October 13, 2010 (aged 69) Atlanta, Georgia, U.S.
- Occupations: Singer songwriter, record producer
- Instrument: Vocals
- Years active: 1961–2010
- Website: http://www.chairmenoftheboard.com/

General Norman Johnson (May 23, 1941 – October 13, 2010) was an American R&B singer, frontman of the Chairmen of the Board, songwriter, and record producer. He usually performed as General Johnson, although sometimes (particularly early in his career) he was billed as Norman Johnson. "General Norman" were in fact his given forenames, in that order; General was not a nickname, stage name or military title.

== Biography ==
Johnson and wife Julia had three children together, Antonio, Norman and Sonya. They resided in the upper-middle class city of East Point, a suburb of Atlanta. Johnson made an early start in music when he began singing in his church choir at the age of six. His recording debut came six years later on Atlantic Records, which recorded his group the Humdingers, although the tracks remain unreleased. In 1961, and following a change in name to the Showmen, Johnson and the group recorded “It Will Stand”, a single for Minit Records. It was a chart hit in both 1961 and 1964. Although the Showmen recorded other offerings for Minit and Swan, including such hits as "39-21-46", they split up in 1968.

Johnson attempted an abortive solo career before joining the then new Invictus label in Detroit, Michigan. Steered by Holland-Dozier-Holland, Johnson recruited Danny Woods (ex-The Showmen), Harrison Kennedy, and Eddie Curtis and created Chairmen of the Board. Their debut single "Give Me Just a Little More Time" rose to #3 in the U.S. Billboard R&B chart in 1970. Additional hits included "(You've Got Me) Dangling on a String" and "Everything's Tuesday".

Johnson commenced a career as songwriter with "Pay to the Piper", becoming a modest success for Chairmen of the Board. Other songs he wrote were successful when recorded by other musicians. These included the Grammy Award-winning "Patches" for Clarence Carter (Jerry Reed also recorded a country music version). Invictus Records labelmates Honey Cone recorded the Johnson penned tracks "Want Ads", "Stick Up", and "One Monkey Don't Stop No Show". Johnson also wrote "Bring the Boys Home" for Freda Payne.

Chairmen of the Board's popularity diminished in the middle of the 1970s, although Johnson and Woods remained together re-billed as the Chairmen. Johnson tried a solo career again in 1976, and his debut solo album on Arista Records was a modest success. He teamed again with Woods in the following decade, making a living on the beach music circuit. In 1993, Johnson released the album What Goes Around Comes Around (recorded with Woods).

In recognition of the contribution that Johnson has made to American popular music, the Virginia General Assembly designated June 9, 2001, as General Johnson Day in Virginia.

Johnson died on October 13, 2010, in suburban Atlanta, Georgia. His obituary in The New York Times reported that his family attributed his death to complications of lung cancer. Other obituaries did not mention lung cancer but did note that he was recovering from recent knee surgery.

== See also ==
- List of people from Hampton Roads
