= Ron Dunbar =

American songwriter, A&R director, and record producer (1939–2018)

Ronald Dunbar (April 15, 1939 – April 3, 2018) was an American songwriter, A&R director and record producer who worked closely with Holland–Dozier–Holland, and with George Clinton. His co-writing credits include the hit songs "Give Me Just a Little More Time", "Band of Gold", and "Patches", for which he won a Grammy. His Grammy award was sold for $2,350 to the owners of TV show Pawn Stars. It was later returned to the Dunbar family, after it was discovered that the buying and selling of Grammy trophies is not allowed.

== Life ==
Born in Detroit, Michigan, he began working for Motown when it was formed in the late 1950s and was first credited as a co-writer for the Valadiers' minor 1961 hit, "Greetings (This Is Uncle Sam)". In January 1961, under the name "Ronnie Love," he had a minor hit with "Chills & Fever." Dunbar continued to work with songwriters and record producers Brian Holland, Lamont Dozier, and Eddie Holland, in an uncredited capacity, until they left Motown over a financial dispute in 1968. Dunbar remained with the three when they set up Holland–Dozier–Holland Productions Inc., and the Invictus and Hot Wax labels, where he became A&R director. Dunbar began to be credited as a songwriter in his own right, as half of a writing partnership with "Edith (or Edyth) Wayne". The latter is now acknowledged to have been a pseudonym used by Holland, Dozier and Holland, who were unable to use their own names because they were legally contracted to Jobete, Motown's song publishing arm. Although it has been said that Dunbar's name was itself used by Holland-Dozier-Holland to cover their own songwriting activities, Dunbar was quoted as follows:

They [Holland-Dozier-Holland] helped to develop, by coaching and by directing the writers and producers that they were "mentoring," and I was one of those people so helped in development. I was given certain projects to write. "Band of Gold" was one of those projects and I came up with the title "Band of Gold" first. My partner, Edith Wayne, and I wrote the lyrics according to how the track was and used the melody structure that we got listening to the track. I was part of the "in-house" team that was being developed at the time. It wound up being a heck of an opportunity for newer writers, like myself and to some other people in getting their careers developed. When I say "newer" I mean people that had some experience but nowhere near the success of the HDH team. It was a great treat to be under the umbrella of H-D-H.

Lamont Dozier's recollection differs:

Brian [Holland] and I came up with "Band of Gold" and "Give Me Just a Little More Time", but we didn't put our names on 'em because we were in a lawsuit and couldn't use our names. So we used Ronnie Dunbar, who was an employee of ours and Edith Wayne, who was a friend of the Holland family....

Dunbar and Wayne were credited as co-writers on most of the hit records produced by Invictus and Hot Wax, including "Give Me Just a Little More Time" by Chairmen of the Board, which reached #3 in both the US and UK in 1970, and Freda Payne's "Band of Gold" which reached #3 in the US and #1 in the UK later the same year. Dunbar also co-wrote "Patches" with General Johnson, the lead singer of Chairmen of the Board; the song became a US #4 and UK #2 hit when recorded by Clarence Carter. "Patches" won the Grammy Award for Best R&B Song in 1971.

After the Hot Wax and Invictus labels folded in the 1970s, Dunbar worked on independent production projects before joining George Clinton's Uncle Jam Records as A&R Director in 1978. He also continued as a songwriter, his most successful song being "Agony of DeFeet" by Parliament/Funkadelic, written with Clinton and Donnie Sterling. The collaborations with Clinton continued until 1980, when Dunbar returned to independent production. From 1998, he worked for Holland Group Productions, established by Edward Holland in Los Angeles.
