= Invictus Records =

Former American record label

- Parent company: HDH Records
- Founded: 1969
- Founder: Brian Holland; Lamont Dozier; Edward Holland, Jr.
- Status: Defunct (1977)
- Distributor(s): Capitol; Columbia
- Genre: Rhythm and blues
- Country of origin: United States
- Location: Detroit, Michigan

Invictus Records was an American record label based in Detroit, Michigan. It was created by former top Motown producers Brian Holland, Lamont Dozier and Edward Holland, Jr. (known collectively as Holland–Dozier–Holland). It was the sister label to the Buddah-distributed Hot Wax Records, which was also owned by Holland-Dozier-Holland.

== History ==
For most of the 1960s until 1967, Holland-Dozier-Holland (H-D-H) were a leading songwriting and production team, providing hits for The Supremes, The Four Tops and other Motown acts. However, they decided to quit the company they had helped to establish and start their own label for better control and greater rewards. They eventually launched Invictus, along with Hot Wax Records, in 1969. Their most successful acts on Invictus were Freda Payne and Chairmen of the Board; they also released Parliament's first album, Osmium. The label was distributed by Capitol Records from 1969 to 1972 and then by Columbia Records from 1973 onwards.

In September 1970, the British music magazine NME reported that Invictus had the UK's top two singles. Freda Payne's "Band of Gold" was No. 1, while Chairmen of the Board's "Give Me Just a Little More Time" was at No. 3 in the UK Singles Chart. Both of those records were million-sellers in the US, but neither topped the pop or R&B charts. Invictus had two other gold records: Freda Payne's "Bring The Boys Home" and 8th Day's "She's Not Just Another Woman", both in 1971.

On leaving Motown, H-D-H were subject to legal action by Berry Gordy and, as a result, they were temporarily barred from issuing new compositions on their labels. Consequently, the names Holland-Dozier-Holland were not used until after 1970; releases were initially credited to Ronald Dunbar (one of their producers) and "Edyth Wayne", which was a pseudonym.

The Invictus label was light blue with black printing. A statue of a seated man (Auguste Rodin's "The Thinker") almost covers the entire label, with "INVICTUS" in dark blue at the top and to the left of the center hole. There are a group of black and white rays coming from the eye of the statue and extending downward to the right.

The trio launched a third label, Music Merchant, through Buddah Records in 1972 and signings included Michael Lovesmith and his brothers who recorded as The Smith Connection, former Motowner Brenda Holloway, The Jones Girls and Eloise Laws, but the only commercial success the label had was with The Smith Connection single "(I've Been a Winner, I've Been a Loser) I've Been in Love", which peaked at number 28 R&B in early 1973. Despite recording over a dozen releases, the label was closed the following year.

In 1973, when Hot Wax folded due to cash flow problems from royalty payment issues, Dozier left to forge a solo career and the Holland brothers moved their remaining artists to Invictus. The label continued to operate on a reduced level until 1977, when it also folded and was eventually remodeled to HDH Records.

Dozier and the Holland brothers still own the catalogue, which is managed by HDH Records.

== Singles discography ==
All singles from 9071 to 9133 were distributed by Capitol Records

- 9071 - Crumbs Off the Table/ Bad Bill of Goods - Glass House (1969)
- 9072 - The Music Box/ A Gift Of Me -The New Play/Ruth Copeland (1969)
- 9073 - The Unhooked Generation/ The Easiest Way To Fall - Freda Payne (1969)
- 9074 - Give Me Just a Little More Time/ Since the Days Of Pigtails (and Fairytales) - Chairmen of the Board (1969)
- 9075 - Band Of Gold/ The Easiest Way To Fall - Freda Payne (1969)
- 9076 - I Can't Be You (You Can't Be Me)/ He's In My Life - Glass House (1970)
- 9077 - Little Old Country Boy/ I Call My Baby Pussycat - A Parliament Thang (1970)
- 9078 - (You've Got Me) Dangling On a String/ I'll Come Crawling - Chairmen of the Board (1970)
- 9079 - Everything's Tuesday/ Patches - Chairmen of the Board (1970)
- 9080 - Deeper and Deeper/ The Unhooked Generation - Freda Payne (1970)
- 9081 - Pay to the Piper/ Bless You - Chairmen of the Board (1970)
- 9082 - Stealing Moments From Another Woman's Life/ If It Ain't Love (It Don't Matter) - Glass House (1970)
- 9083 - Trapped In Love/ When Love Was a Child - Barrino Brothers (1971)
- 9084 - I Shall Not Be Moved/ When Love Was a Child - Barrino Brothers (1971)
- 9085 - The World Don't Owe You a Thing/ Cherish What Is Dear To You (While It Is Near To You) - Freda Payne (1971)
- 9086 - Chairman of the Board/ When Will She Tell Me She Needs Me - Chairman of the Board (1971)
- 9087 - She's Not Just Another Woman/ I Can't Fool Myself - The 8th Day (1971)
- 9088 - Hare Krishna/ No Commitment - Ruth Copeland (1971)
- 9089 - Hanging On (To a Memory)/ Tricked and Trapped - Chairmen of the Board (1971)
- 9090 - Touch Me Jesus/ If It Ain't Love (It Don't Matter) - Glass House (1971)
- 9091 - Red Hot Mama/ Little Ole Country Boy - Parliament (1971)
- 9092 - Bring the Boys Home/ I Shall Not Be Moved - Freda Payne (1971)
- 9093 - I'm In Love Darling/ Savannah Lady - General Johnson (1971)
- 9094 - Old Mother Nature/ What I Am - Lucifer (1971)
- 9095 - Breakdown/ Little Ole Country Boy - Parliament (1971)
- 9096 - Gimmie Shelter/ No Commitment - Ruth Copeland (1971)
- 9097 - Look What We've Done To Love/ Heaven Is There To Guide Us - Glass House (1971)
- 9098 - You've Got To Crawl (Before You Walk)/ It's Instrumental To Be Free - The 8th Day (1971)
- 9099 - Try On My Love For Size/ Working On a Building Of Love - Chairmen of the Board (1971)
- 9100 - You Brought the Joy/ Suddenly It's Yesterday - Freda Payne (1971)
- 9101 - Nothing But the Devil/ Yeah I'm the Devil - Johnn Billy West (1971)
- 9102 - Solo/ I Don't Want To Lose a Good Thing - Billie Sans (1971)
- 9103 - Men Are Getting Scarce/ Bravo Hooray - Chairmen of the Board (1971)
- 9104 - I Shall Not Be Moved/ I Had It All - Barrino Brothers (1971)
- 9105 - Bittersweet/ Elmo James - Chairmen of the Board (1971)
- 9106 - All We Need Is Understanding/ Savannah Lady - General Johnson (1971)
- 9107 - If I Could See the Light/ Instrumental - 8th Day (1971)
- 9108 - We Gotta Go/ Don't You (Think the Times a-Comin') - Lucifer (1971)
- 9109 - The Road We Didn't Take/ I'm Not Getting Any Better - Freda Payne (1971)
- 9110 - Don't Leave Me/ Instrumental - Holland & Dozier (1972)
- 9111 - Playing Games/ Let It Flow - Glass House (1972)
- 9112 - Sunday Morning People/ Up The Organization (Instrumental) - Harrison Kennedy (1972)
- 9113 - Bloodshot Eyes/ Old Mother Nature - Lucifer (1972)
- 9114 - V.I.P./ It Ain't the World (It's the People In It) - Scherrie Payne (1972)
- 9115 - I'm Worried/ Just As Long - Melvin Davis (1972)
- 9116 - Let Me Ride/ It Didn't Take Long - Danny Woods (1972)
- 9117 - Eeny-Meeny-Miny-Mo/ Rocks In My Head - 8th Day (1972)
- 9118 - Giving Up the Ring/ Let It Flow - Glass House (1972)
- 9119 - Come Together/ Sunday Morning People - Harrison Kennedy (1972)
- 9120 - I Don't See Me In Your Eyes Anymore/ Hey There Lonely Girl - Ty Hunter (1972)
- 9121 - Try It You'll Like It/ I Had It All - Barrino Brothers (1972)
- 9122 - Everybody's Got a Song To Sing/ Working On a Building Of Love - Chairmen of the Board (1972)
- 9123 - Come On In Out Of the Rain/ Little Ole Country Boy - Parliament (1972)
- 9124 - I Gotta Get Home (Can't Let My Baby Get Lone)/ Good Book - 8th Day (1972)
- 9125 - Why Can't We Be Lovers/ Don't Leave Me (Instrumental) - Holland & Dozier (1972)
- 9126 - Let Me Down Easy/ I Can't Find Myself - Chairmen of the Board (1972)
- 9127 - Unused
- 9128 - Through the Memory Of My Mind/ He's In My Life - Freda Payne (1972)
- 9129 - Thanks I Needed That/ I Don't See Me In Your Eyes Anymore - Glass House (1972)
- 9130 - Livin' High Off the Goodness Of Your Love(Single, Instrumental) - Barrino Brothers
- 9131 - Unused
- 9132 - Everybody's Tippin'/ Roller Coaster - Danny Woods
- 9133 - Don't Leave Me Starving For Your Love (Part 1)/ (Part 2) - Holland & Dozier (1972)

All singles from 1251 to 1283 were distributed by Columbia/CBS Records

- 1251 - Finders Keepers/ Instrumental - Chairmen of the Board (1973)
- 1252 - Only Time Will Tell/ Instrumental - General Johnson (1973)
- 1253 - Slipping Away/ Can't Get Enough (Instrumental) - Holland & Dozier (1973)
- 1254 - New Breed Kinda Woman/ If You Don't Want To Be In My Life - Holland & Dozier (1973)
- 1255 - Two Wrongs Don't Make a Right/ We've Gotta Find a Way Back To Love - Freda Payne (1973)
- 1256 - Born On the Wild/ Instrumental - Barrino Brothers (1973)
- 1257 - For No Reason/ Mother Misery's Favourite Child - Freda Payne (1973)
- 1258 - You Took Me From a World Outside/ I'm Gonna Hijack Ya, Kidnap Ya, Take What I Want - Holland & Dozier (1973)
- 1259 - You Made Me Over/ I'm Worried - Melvin Davis (1973)
- 1260 - Sittin' On a Time Bomb (Waiting For the Hurt To Come)/ Get Your House In Order (Instrumental) - Lee Charles (1974)
- 1261 - Unused
- 1262 - Unused
- 1263 - Life and Death/ Live With Me Love With Me - Chairmen of the Board (1974)
- 1264 - I Need It Just As Bad As You - If I'm Good Enough To Love (I'm Good Enough To Marry) - Laura Lee (1974)
- 1265 - I'm So Glad (Part 1)/ (Part 2) - Brian Holland (1974)
- 1266 - Unused
- 1267 - Bump Your Lady (Part 1)/ (Part 2) - Natural High (1974)
- 1268 - Everybody Party All Night/ Morning Glory (Instrumental) - Chairmen of the Board (1974)
- 1269 - Can't Get Enough Of You/ You Took Me from a World Outside - Tyrone Edwards
- 1270 - Unused
- 1271 - Let's Have Some Fun/ Love At First Sight - Chairmen of the Board (1974)
- 1272 - Let's Get Together/ Superwoman (You Ain't No Ordinary Woman) - Brian Holland (1974)
- 1273 - Don't Leave Me Starving For Your Love/ (If You Want To Try Love Again) Remember Me - Laura Lee (1974)
- 1274 - That's Love/ Instrumental - Hi-Lites (1974)
- 1275 - Wanting You/ Instrumental - Earl English (1974)
- 1276 - Skin I'm In/ Love At First Sight - Chairmen of the Board (1974)
- 1277 - Touch Me/ Stay With Me - Eloise Laws (1974)
- 1278 - You've Got Extra Added Power In Your Love/ Someone Just Like You - Chairmen of the Board (1976)
- 1279 - I Got It/ Part 2 - New York Port Authority (1976)
- 1280 - Love Goes Deeper Than That/ Put a Little Love Into It - Eloise Laws (1977)
- 1281 - I Use To Hate It (Till I Ate It)/ I Got It - New York Port Authority (1977)
- 1282 - Put a Little Love Into It/ Camouflage - Eloise Laws (1977)
- 1283 - I Don't Want To Work Today/ Guess I'm Gonna Cry - New York Port Authority (1977)

== Album discography ==
- 7300 - Give Me Just a Little More Time - Chairmen of the Board [1970] (5-70, No. 133)
- 7301 - Band of Gold - Freda Payne [1970] (8-70, No. 60)
- 7302 - Osmium - Parliament [1970]
- 7303 - Self Portrait - Ruth Copeland [1970]
- 7304 - In Session - Chairmen of the Board [1970] (11-70, No. 117)
- 7305 - Inside the Glass House - The Glass House [1971]
- 7306 - The 8th Day - 8th Day [1971] (8-71, No. 131)
- 7307 - Contact - Freda Payne [1971] (6-71, No. 76)
- 7309 - Lucifer - Lucifer [1971]
- 7311 - Black Mass - Lucifer [1972] [unissued]
- 9801 - Bittersweet - Chairmen of the Board [1972] (5-72, N. 178)
- 9802 - I Am What I Am - Ruth Copeland [1972]
- 9803 - Generally Speaking - General Johnson [1972]
- 9804 - Best of Freda Payne - Freda Payne [1972] (4-72, No. 152)
- 9806 - Hypnotic Music - Harrison Kennedy [1972]
- 9807 - Invictus' Greatest Hits - Various Artists [1972]
- 9808 - Aries - Danny Woods [1972]
- 9809 - I Gotta Get Home - 8th Day [1972]
- 9810 - Thanks, I Needed That - Glass House [1972]
- 9811 - Livin' High Off the Goodness of Your Love - Barrino Brothers [1972]
- KZ-32493 - Reaching Out - Freda Payne [1973]
- KZ-32526 - Skin I'm In - Chairmen Of The Board [1973]
- KZ-33133 - I Can't Make It Alone - Laura Lee [1973]
- PZ-33134 - Love and Beauty - Lamont Dozier [1975]
- PZ-34379 - Ain't It Good Feeling Good - Eloise Laws [1977]
- PZ-34380 - Three Thousand Miles From Home - New York Port Authority [1977]
