= Kimberley Locke discography =

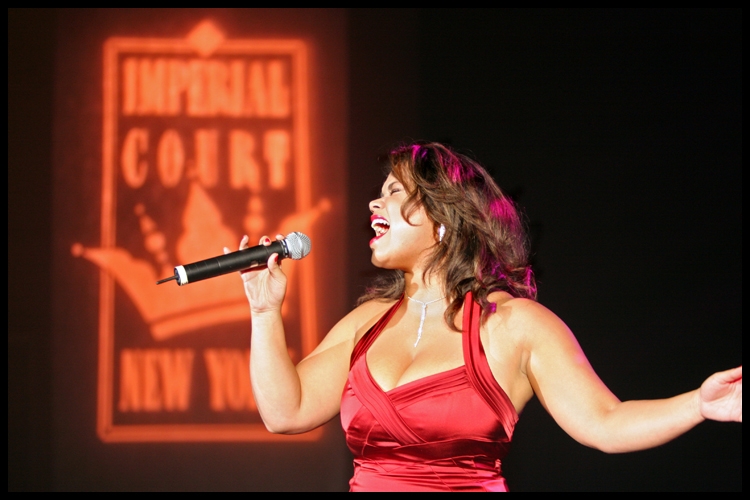
- Studio albums: 5
- EPs: 1
- Compilation albums: 1
- Singles: 19
- Music videos: 8

The discography of American singer Kimberley Locke consists of five studio albums, one extended play, one compilation album, nineteen singles, and eight music videos.

Following her top-three finish on the second season of American Idol in 2003, Locke was signed to a recording deal with Curb Records. Her debut album, One Love, was released on May 4, 2004, and entered the Billboard 200 chart at number sixteen. The album spawned four singles including the top-40 hit "8th World Wonder".

Locke's second album, Based on a True Story, was released on May 1, 2007. While first week sales did not match those of her first album, debuting at number 160 on the Billboard 200, it contained several successful singles. Curb began including dance remix packages with each of the single releases, each hitting number one on the Billboard dance charts. All three went on to be included in the top 40 year-end dance charts and the album's second single, a cover of the Freda Payne classic "Band of Gold" was featured at number 45 on Billboard's best dance songs of the decade list.

Later that same year, Locke released her holiday album, Christmas, on November 6, 2007. This was her third and last album with Curb Records. As with her previous releases, this album contained several successful singles. The first and most successful single, "Up on the House Top," quickly reached number one on the Adult Contemporary chart, a spot it held for four weeks. This was the fifth song in the history of the chart to reach number one in only three weeks on this chart and the first number one for the Curb label in eight years. The next two singles from the album, "Jingle Bells" and "Frosty the Snowman" also went number one on this chart.

In 2010, Locke teamed up with American Idol judge Randy Jackson and his new dance label, Dream Merchant 21, to release her first independent single, "Strobelight." The following year she decided to form her own label, I AM Entertainment, and immediately started working on her next project. The dance-themed EP, Four for the Floor, was released on July 19, 2011. The only single, "Finally Free," which Locke had co-written with fellow American Idol alum Ace Young, was promoted the following summer accompanied by a music video and remix package and reached number 35 on the dance chart.

In 2013, she teamed up with UK production team Cahill for her latest single "Feel the Love," which she had co-written with long-time collaborator Damon Sharpe. The single scored her first international number one hit, topping both the UK club and pop charts and reaching number 29 on the global dance charts.

In 2021, she released two more studio albums. Her first album of Children's music, You're My Baby, was released in May and her second album of Christmas music, Christmas Is Here, on which she teamed up with the band EMP3 was released in September. The title track from the album, a cover of a Donna Summer original song from her 1994 album Christmas Spirit was released as the lead single.

In 2023, Locke release a compilation album, Best of Kimberley Locke. The 16 track album features her singles, two previously unreleased songs, and two brand new recordings; including her new single Keep On (Falling in Love), which was produced by Dave Audé.

== Albums ==
=== Studio albums ===
Title	Album details	Peak chart positions	
Title	Album details	Billboard 200	US Internet
One Love	Release date: May 4, 2004; Label: Curb; Formats: CD, digital download	16	16
Based on a True Story	Release date: May 1, 2007; Label: Curb; Formats: CD, digital download	160	-
Christmas	Release date: November 6, 2007; Label: Curb; Formats: CD-R, digital download	-	-
You're My Baby	Release date: May 9, 2021; Label: I AM Entertainment; Formats: digital download	-	-
Christmas Is Here	Release date: September 30, 2021; Label: I AM Entertainment; Formats: digital download	-	-

=== Singles ===
Year	Single	Peak chart positions										Album
Year	Single	Billboard Hot 100	US Top 40	US AC	US Adult	US Dance	CAN AC	UK Singles	UK Club	UK Pop	Global Dance	Album
2003	"Silver Bells" (with Clay Aiken)	—	—	16	—	—	—	—	—	—	—	American Idol: Great Holiday Classics
2004	"8th World Wonder"	49	19	6	36	1	16	49	—	—	—	One Love
2004	"Wrong"	—	39	—	—	—	—	—	—	—	—	One Love
2005	"Coulda Been"	—	—	—	—	—	—	90	—	—	—	One Love
2005	"I Could"	—	—	8	—	—	18	—	—	—	—	One Love
2005	"Up on the House Top"	—	—	1	—	—	—	—	—	—	—	Christmas
2006	"Jingle Bells"	—	—	1	—	—	—	—	—	—	—	Christmas
2007	"Change"	—	—	6	—	1	—	—	—	—	30	Based on a True Story
2007	"Band of Gold"	—	—	9	—	1	21	—	—	—	23	Based on a True Story
2007	"Frosty the Snowman"	—	—	1	—	—	40	—	—	—	—	Christmas
2008	"Fall"	—	—	17	—	1	—	—	—	—	27	Based on a True Story
2008	"We Need a Little Christmas"	—	—	19	—	—	—	—	—	—	—	Christmas
2010	"Strobelight"	—	—	—	—	5	—	—	—	—	30	non-album single
2011	"Silver Bells"	—	—	—	—	—	—	—	—	—	—	non-album single
2012	"Finally Free"	—	—	—	—	35	—	—	—	—	—	Four for the Floor
2013	"Feel the Love" (with Cahill)	—	—	—	—	—	—	—	1	1	29	non-album single
2018	"Raise Your Hands"	—	—	—	—	—	—	—	—	—	—	non-album single
2021	"Christmas Is Here"	—	—	—	—	—	—	—	—	—	—	Christmas Is Here
2023	"Keep On (Falling in Love)"	—	—	—	—	—	—	—	—	—	—	Best of Kimberley Locke

=== Promotional singles ===
Title	Year	Album
"You've Changed"	2004	One Love
"Supawoman"	2006	Based on a True Story
"Trust Myself"	2006	Based on a True Story
"Dangerous Woman" (with Bond Villain)	2016	non-album single
"The Christmas Waltz"	2017	non-album single

== Extended plays ==
Title	Details
Four for the Floor	Released: July 19, 2011; Label: I AM Entertainment; Formats: CD, digital download

== Music videos ==
List of music videos, showing year released and director
Title	Year	Director(s)
"8th World Wonder"	2004	Sam Erickson
"Wrong"	2004	Urban Strom
"Coulda Been"	2004	Urban Strom
"Change"	2007	Roman White
"Silver Bells"	2011	Eric Baldetti & Adam Bergey
"Finally Free"	2012	Walid Azami
"Feel the Love"	2013	Sameer Patel
"The Christmas Waltz"	2017	Rick DiMichele

== Other appearances ==
Year	Track	Album
2002	All Tracks - Backing Vocals (Ammon)	The New Blues Sessions
2003	"Over the Rainbow"	American Idol Season 2: All-Time Classic American Love Songs
2003	What the World Needs Now Is Love (ensemble)	American Idol Season 2: All-Time Classic American Love Songs
2003	God Bless the USA (ensemble)	American Idol Season 2: All-Time Classic American Love Songs
2003	"The Christmas Song"	American Idol: The Great Holiday Classics
2003	"O Come, All Ye Faithful" (ensemble)	American Idol: The Great Holiday Classics
2003	"Santa Claus Is Coming to Town" (ensemble)	American Idol: The Great Holiday Classics
2005	"A Dream Is a Wish Your Heart Makes"	DisneyMania 3
2005	"Wishes!" (with Peabo Bryson)	Disney Wishes!
2005	"Better Than This"	The Perfect Man motion picture soundtrack
2005	"Come Together Now" (ensemble)	non-album charity single
2007	"Please Come Home for Christmas" (with Dave Koz)	Memories of a Winter's Night
2008	"Let the Fire Burn Hot"	Camille motion picture soundtrack
2008	"Lay Down in My Love"	Camille motion picture soundtrack
2010	"Spanish Guitar" (with Benise)	The Spanish Guitar
2018	"Break On Me" (with Bond Villain)	Non-album single
