= Strobelight (song) =

Single by Kimberley Locke
- Released: April 6, 2010 (Original); June 8, 2010 (Remixes)
- Recorded: 2009
- Genre: Dance-pop, nu-disco
- Length: 3:42
- Label: Dream Merchant 21
- Songwriters: Rasmus Bille Bähncke, Robbie Nevil, Lauren Evans, Raquelle Gracie, Kimberley Locke, Cutfather
- Producers: Rasmus Bille Bähncke, Cutfather, Randy Jackson

Kimberley Locke singles chronology
"We Need a Little Christmas" (2008)	"Strobelight" (2010)	"Silver Bells" (2011)

"Strobelight" is a single from American recording artist Kimberley Locke, her first with Randy Jackson's newly formed dance music label, Dream Merchant 21. The song was written by Rasmus Bille Bähncke, Robbie Nevil, Lauren Evans, Raquelle Garcie, Locke and Cutfather and produced by Bähncke, Cutfather and Jackson. It was released as a single on April 6, 2010 and the remixes were released on June 8, 2010. The song is also Locke's first release of original material since 2007's Change.

Following the success Kimberley had on the dance charts with remixes of her prior singles, she was excited to release her first dance song in its original state. "It's exciting for me to come out of the gate with a dance song. '8th World Wonder' 'Band of Gold' were both remixed as dance songs but 'Strobelight' is straight out of the gate as a dance song." Unlike her other singles, this is her first to not be in support of a full album. "I signed a singles only deal with Randy Jackson so there will be no album. We live in a world where people go to itunes and download the songs they want."

== Track listings and formats ==
- Digital download
1. Strobelight - 3:42
- The Remixes: US promotional CD
1. "Strobelight" (Tony Moran & Warren Rigg Radio Edit)
2. "Strobelight" (DJ Renegade Radio Edit)
3. "Strobelight" (Donni Hotwheel Radio Edit)
4. "Strobelight" (Ray Roc & Gabe Ramos Radio Edit)
5. "Strobelight" (Tony Moran & Warren Rigg Remix)
6. "Strobelight" (DJ Renegade Club Mix)
7. "Strobelight" (Ray Roc & Gabe Ramos Club Mix)
8. "Strobelight" (Donni Hotwheel Club Mix)

The Remixes: US digital download

1. "Strobelight" (Tony Moran & Warren Rigg Radio Edit)
2. "Strobelight" (DJ Renegade Radio Edit)
3. "Strobelight" (Donni Hotwheel Radio Edit)
4. "Strobelight" (Ray Roc & Gabe Ramos Radio Edit)
5. "Strobelight" (Tony Moran & Warren Rigg Club Mix)
6. "Strobelight" (DJ Renegade Club Mix)
7. "Strobelight" (Donni Hotwheel Club Mix)
8. "Strobelight" (Ray Roc & Gabe Ramos Club Mix)
9. "Strobelight" (Donni Hotwheel D.H.O.T. Dub)
10. "Strobelight" (Donni Hotwheel Vocal Mix)
11. "Strobelight" (DJ Renegade Dub)

== Charts ==
Chart (2010)	Peak position
U.S. Billboard Hot Dance Club Songs	5
U.S. Billboard Hot Dance Airplay	24
