= Christmas (Kimberley Locke album) =

Studio album by Kimberley Locke
- Released: November 6, 2007
- Recorded: 2005–07
- Genre: Christmas music
- Length: 34:36
- Label: Curb
- Producer: Mike Curb; Michael Lloyd; Mark Feist; Damon Sharpe

Kimberley Locke chronology
Based on a True Story (2007)	Christmas (2007)	Four for the Floor (2011)

Singles from Christmas
- 1. "Up on the House Top" Released: November, 2005; 2. "Jingle Bells" Released: November, 2006; 3. "Frosty the Snowman" Released: November, 2007; 4. "We Need a Little Christmas" Released: November 2008

Christmas, a 2007 collection of Christmas songs, is the third studio album by American recording artist Kimberley Locke. The album was only released digitally.

== Background ==
After Locke saw her first holiday single, "Up On the House Top", sit at the top of Billboard magazine's Adult Contemporary chart for 4 weeks in 2005, a full holiday album was planned for release during the 2006 holiday season. With the delay of her second studio album Based on a True Story, the label decided to delay plans on the holiday album as well until the 2007 season. Instead, only "Jingle Bells" was released as a single, which again brought Locke's name to the top of the Billboard AC chart.

Along with the release of the album, a third holiday single, "Frosty the Snowman", was sent to radio, and once again brought Locke's name to the top of the AC chart. The album's final single, "We Need a Little Christmas", failed to make the impression the other single had, peaking at number 19.

The album sold 3,000 copies as of December 31, 2008.

== Track listing ==
No.	Title	Writer(s)	Length
1.	"We Need a Little Christmas"	Jerry Herman	2:31
2.	"Frosty the Snowman"	Jack Rollins, Steve Nelson	2:21
3.	"Merry Christmas Darling"	Frank Pooler, Richard Carpenter	3:09
4.	"I've Got My Love to Keep Me Warm"	Irving Berlin	3:00
5.	"Up On the Housetop"	Benjamin Hanby	2:19
6.	"Away in a Manger"	James R. Murray	2:49
7.	"Last Christmas"	George Michael	3:42
8.	"Jingle Bells"	James Lord Pierpont	2:53
9.	"A Holly Jolly Christmas"	Johnny Marks	2:25
10.	"Mary, Did You Know?"	Mark Lowry, Buddy Greene	4:15
11.	"Ave Maria"	Traditional	3:55

== Charts ==
=== Singles ===
Charting Year	Single	Chart	Peak Position
2005	"Up On the House Top"	U.S. Adult Contemporary	1
2005	"Up On the House Top"	U.S. Adult Contemporary Recurrents	15
2005	"Up On the House Top"	Top AC Singles of 2006	36
2006	"Jingle Bells"	U.S. Adult Contemporary	1
2007	"Frosty the Snowman"	U.S. Adult Contemporary	1
2007	"Frosty the Snowman"	Canadian Adult Contemporary	40
2007	"Frosty the Snowman"	Top AC Singles of 2008	46
2008	"We Need a Little Christmas"	U.S. Adult Contemporary	19
