= Rushville Historic District =

Rushville Ohio Historic District

- U.S. National Register of Historic Places
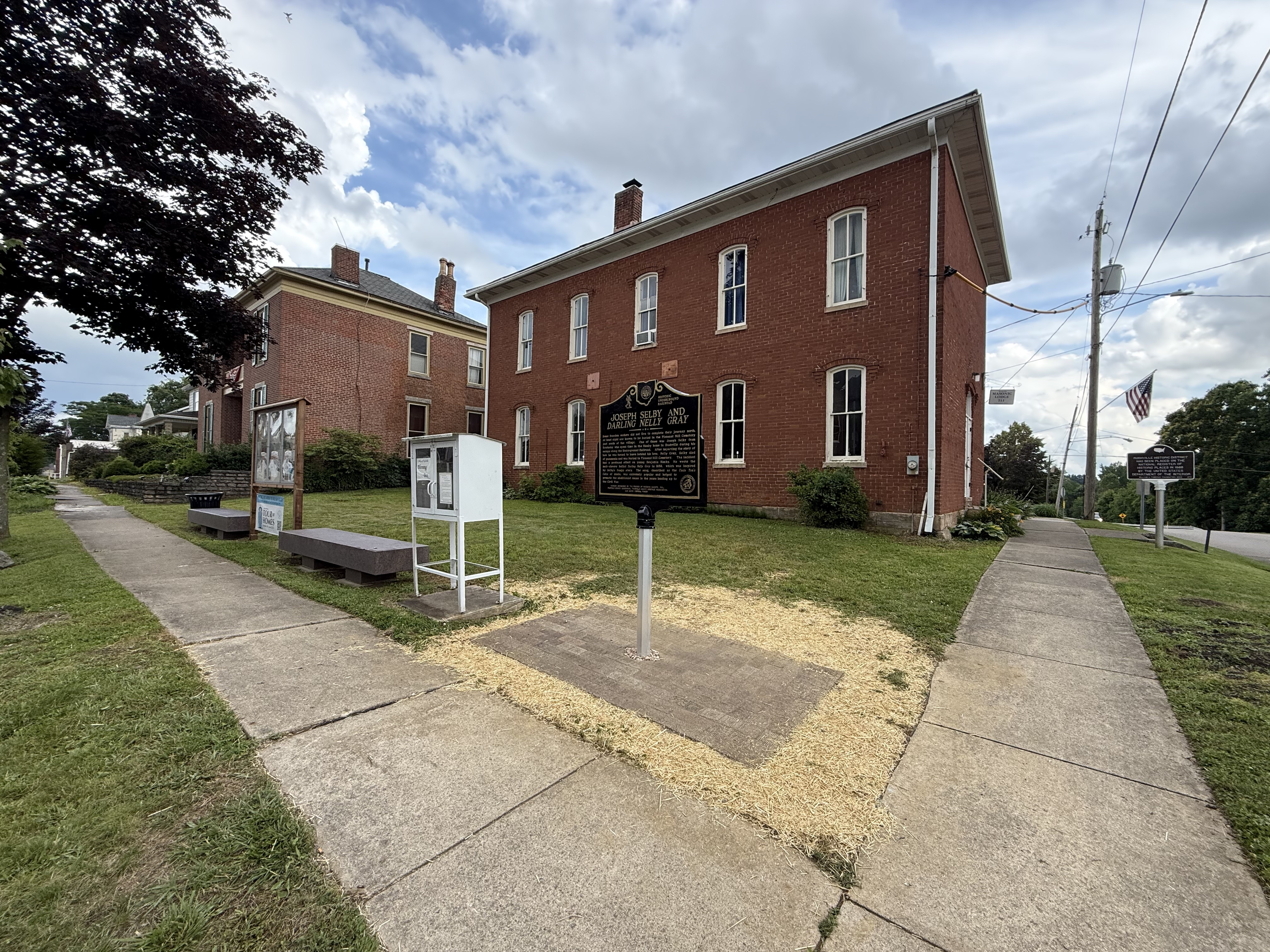
- Historic marker at center of Rushville Ohio

- Location within Ohio
- Location: Bremen Ave., Main and Market Sts., Rushville, Ohio
- Coordinates: 39.764167°N 82.430833°W
- Area: 33 acres (13 ha)
- Built: 1810
- Architectural style: Late Victorian, Gothic Revival, Federal
- NRHP reference No.: 80002996
- Added to NRHP: November 24, 1980

The Rushville Historic District is a historic district in Richland Township, Fairfield County Ohio which bounds the original village of Rushville. The district is considered both historically and architecturally significant due to the preservation of many houses and commercial buildings representing a period from the 1820s to the early 1900s. It features examples of log construction, Gothic Revival, Federal, Italianate, and Queen Anne style architecture.

Founded by Joseph Turner in 1808, Rushville is one of the earliest settlements in Fairfield County and stands south of the original Zane's Trace road constructed by Colonel Ebenezer Zane in 1797. Zane's Trace ran from Wheeling, WV to Maysville, KY and was the first road into Ohio and lead to the establishment of the first towns in the interior of the state. Because of its location near this route Rushville became a successful commercial area which featured several inns, taverns, and merchant shops. Rushville was also a stop on the Underground Railroad in the years preceding the Civil War. Several prominent abolitionists lived in the village including the Rev. William Hanby and his son, composer Benjamin Hanby. An Ohio Historical Marker recognizing Rushville's role in the Underground Railroad was dedicated in 2025 at the center of town.

Today Rushville is bypassed by modern U.S. Route 22 which seems to have left the village largely untouched by change since the mid-20th century. The District was added to the National Register of Historic Places in 1980.

The district includes 87 contributing buildings in a 33 acres (13 ha) area.

== Gallery ==
Rushville National Historic District Contributing Buildings

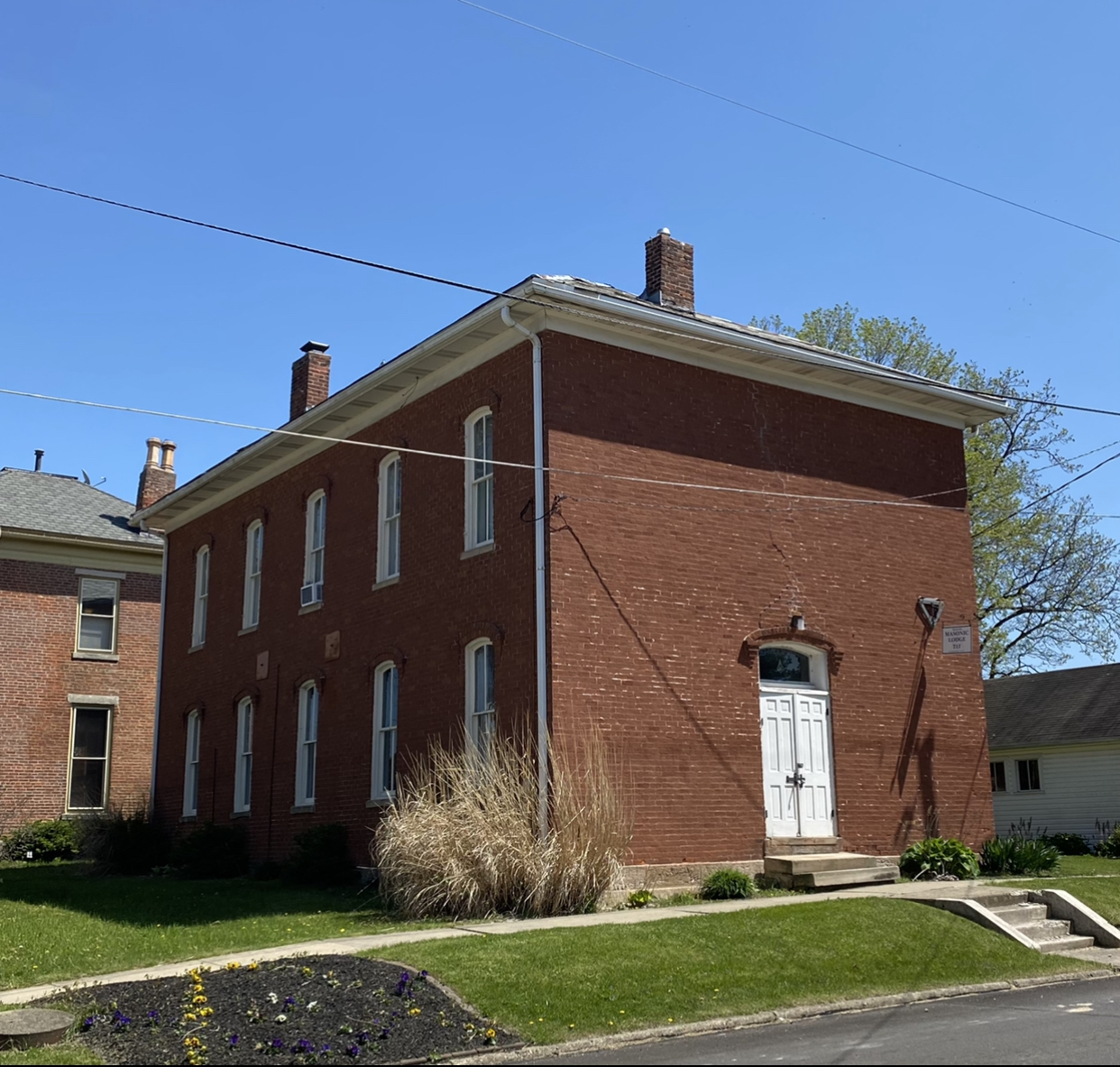
Masonic & Town Hall building - Built in 1875 this building serves as both the village Town Hall and the Masonic Hall for Rushville Lodge 211

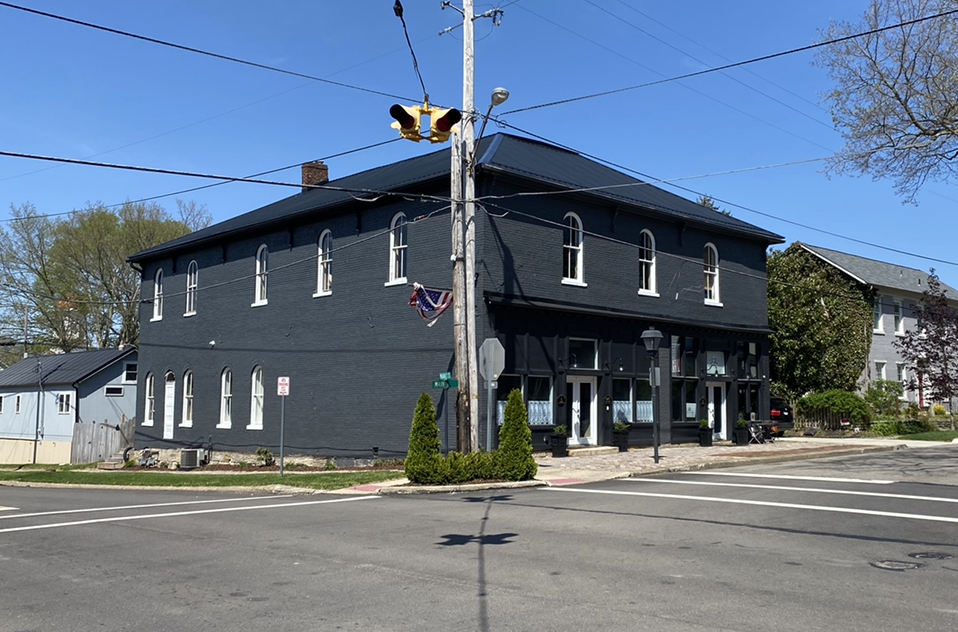
Rushville Grange Hall - Built c.1840 and located at the center of town, this building served for many years as the local Grange Hall. It now houses the Ohio Valley OutFitters

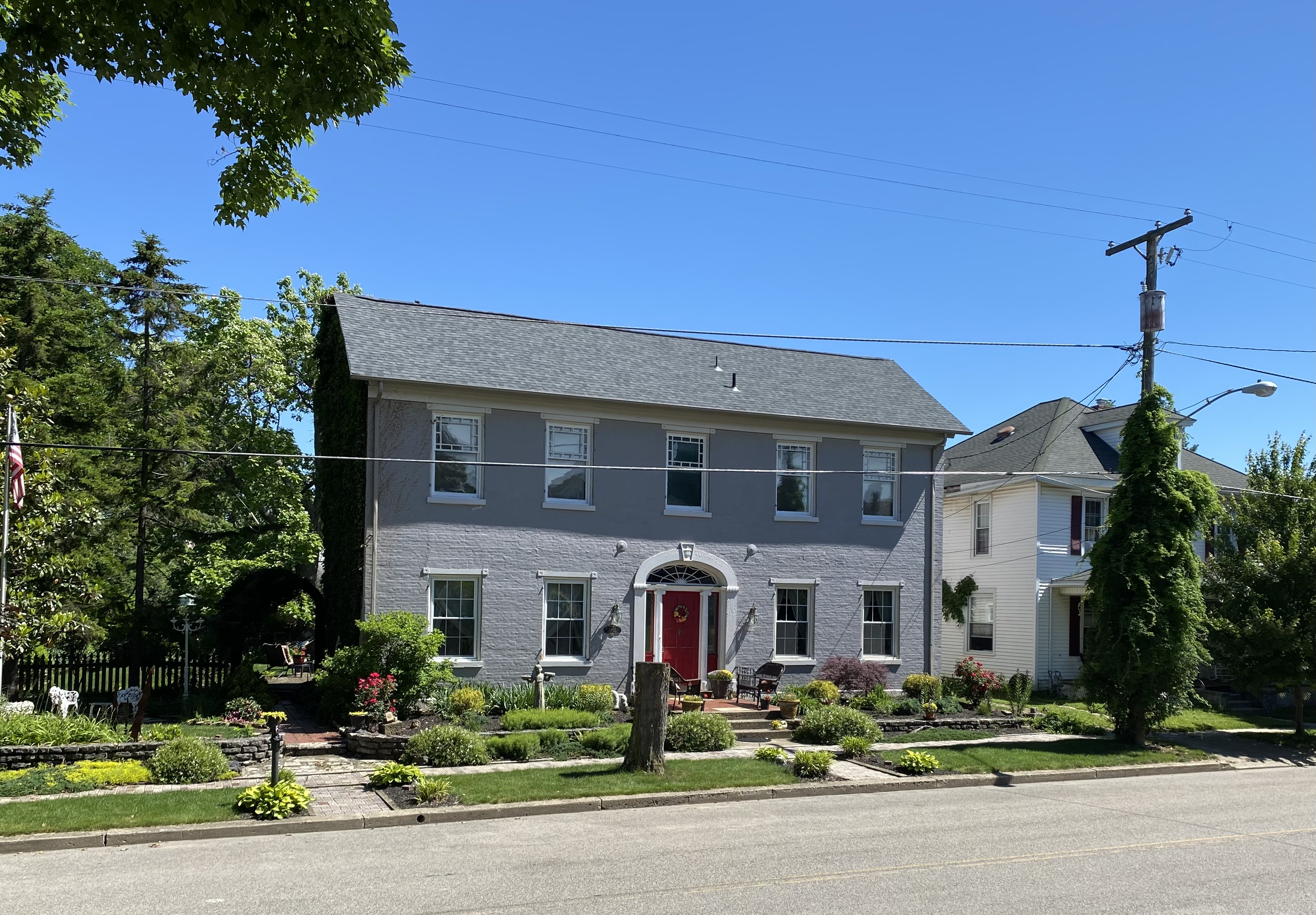
Simon Hyde House - Built in 1830 by local physician Dr. Simon Hyde, this house was known to have been used as a stop on the Underground Railroad.

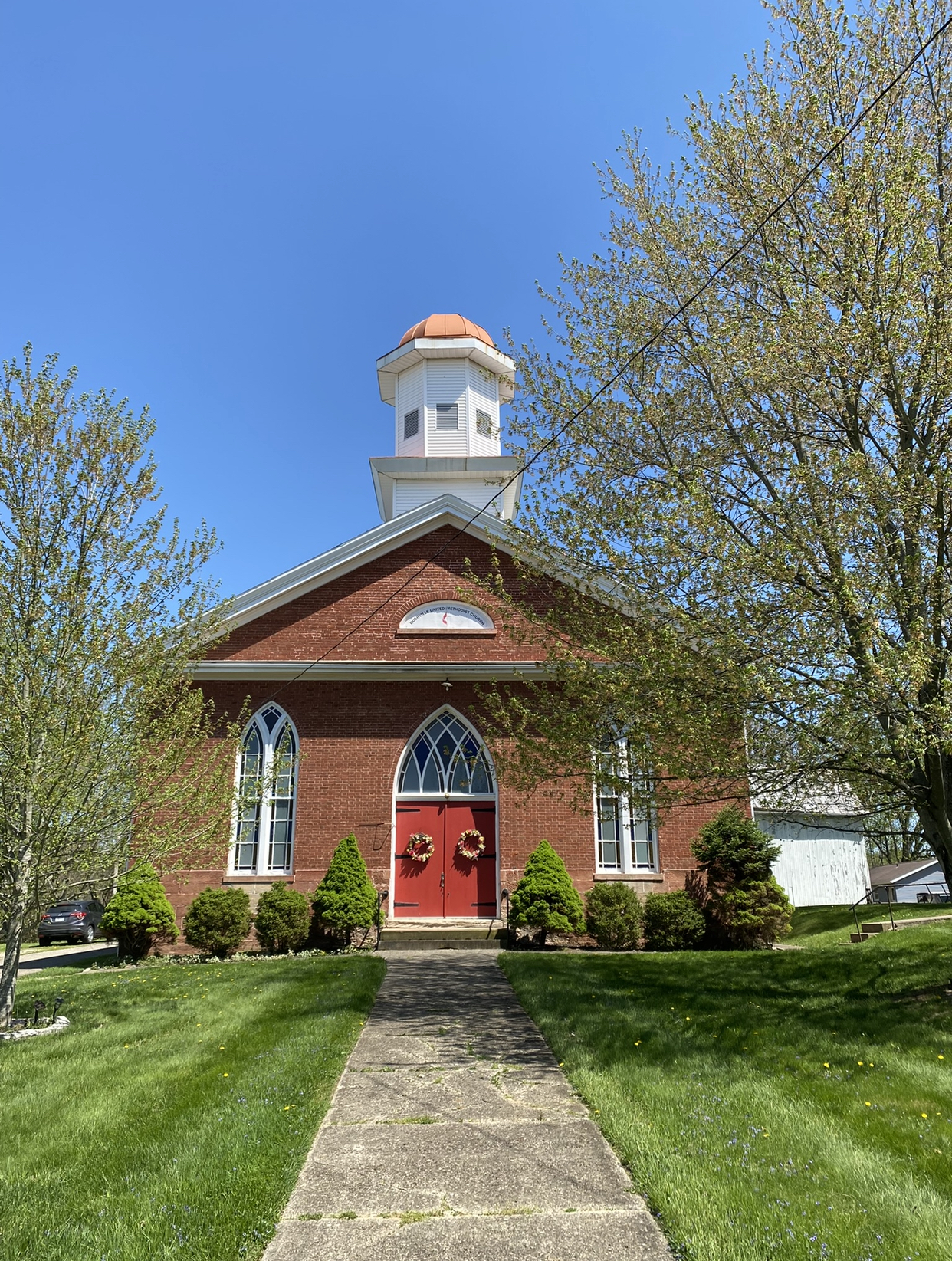
Rushville United Methodist Church - Built in 1836 by local builder Daniel Baker, this church still serves the local community

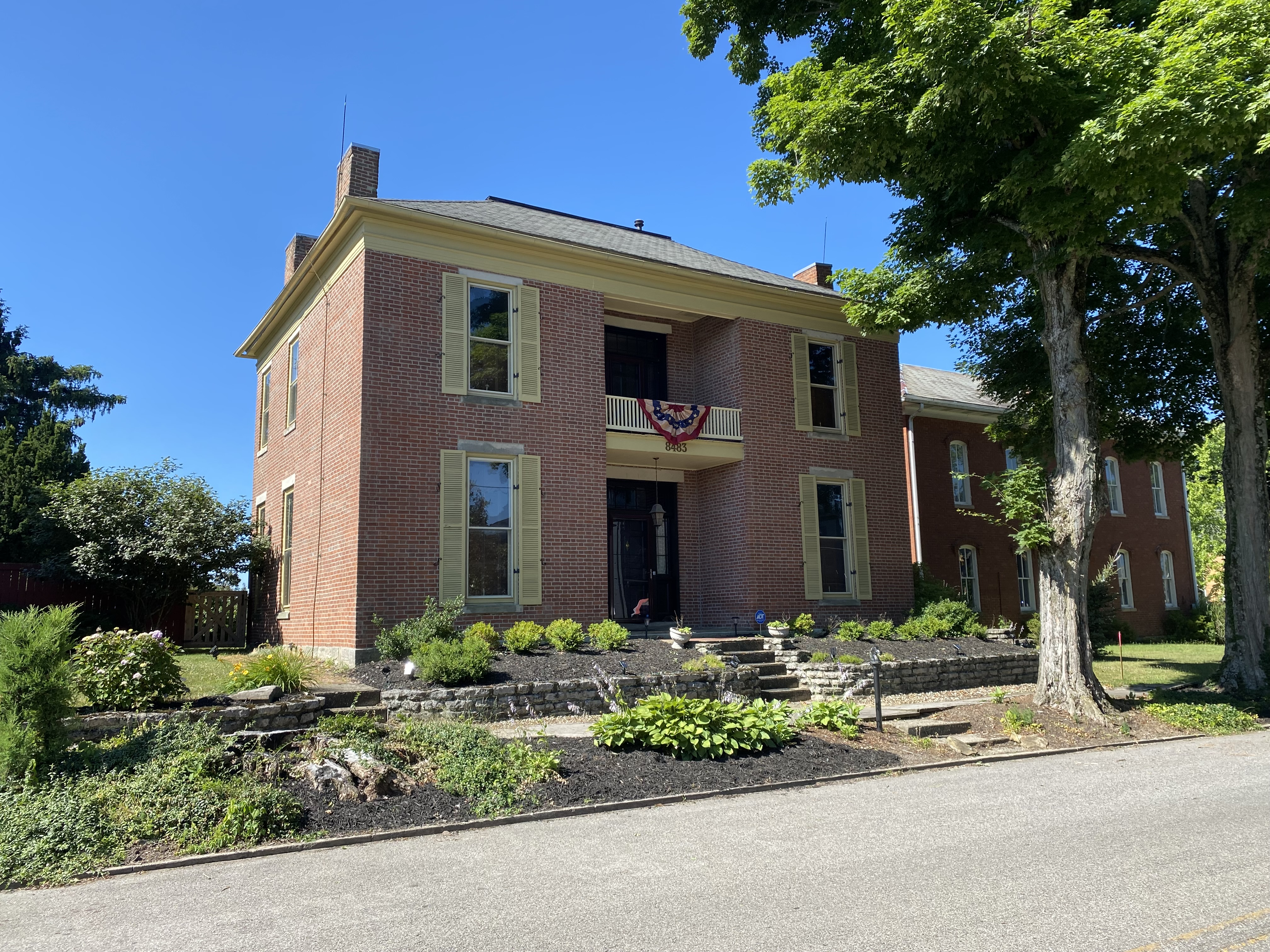
Daniel Baker House - Built c.1820 by Daniel Baker. According to the book "Heritage of Architecture and Arts in Fairfield County, Ohio" by Ruth W. Drinkle this house was also used as a stop on the Underground Railroad along with several other nearby houses such as the Dr. Simon Hyde house across the street.

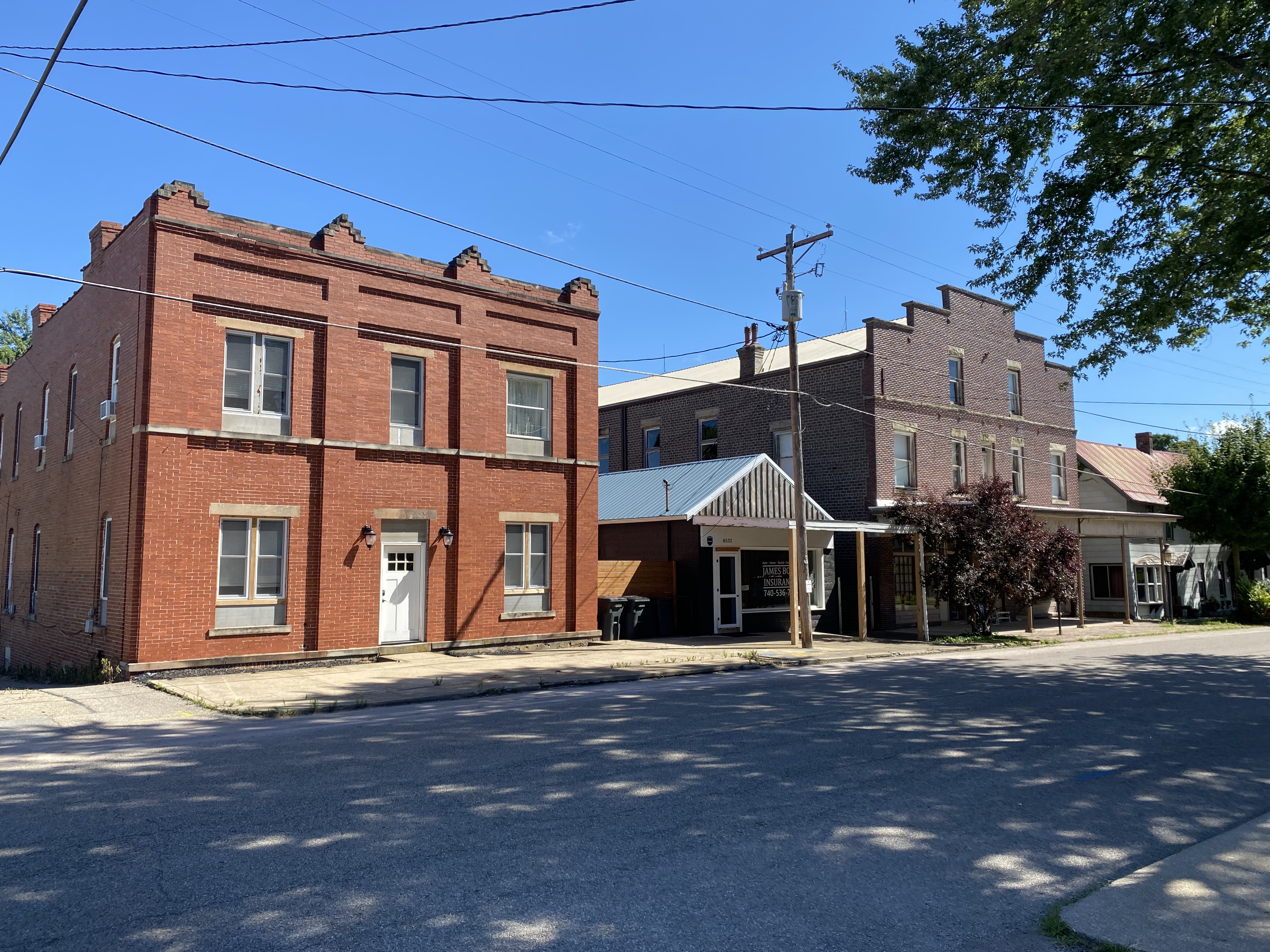
Rushville Hotel and Theater - Both built c.1910s The Rushville Theater (on right) features an auditorium on the second floor with a storefront on the ground floor. The Rushville Hotel (on left) now serves as an apartment building.

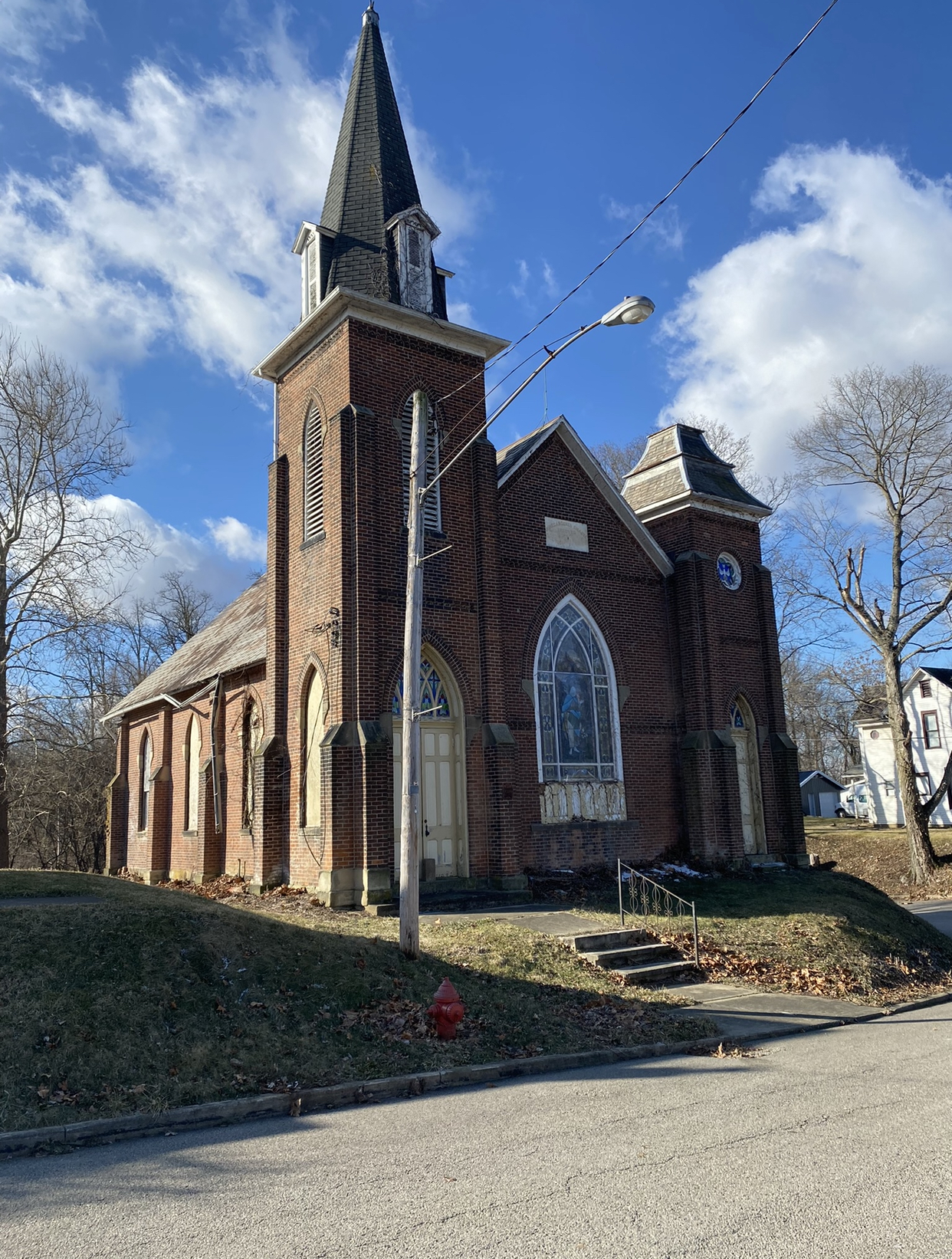
Winegardner Chapel - Built in 1887 by Jacob Jefferson Winegardner. Originally a German Reformed Church it later served as an Anglican Church until the late 1990s.

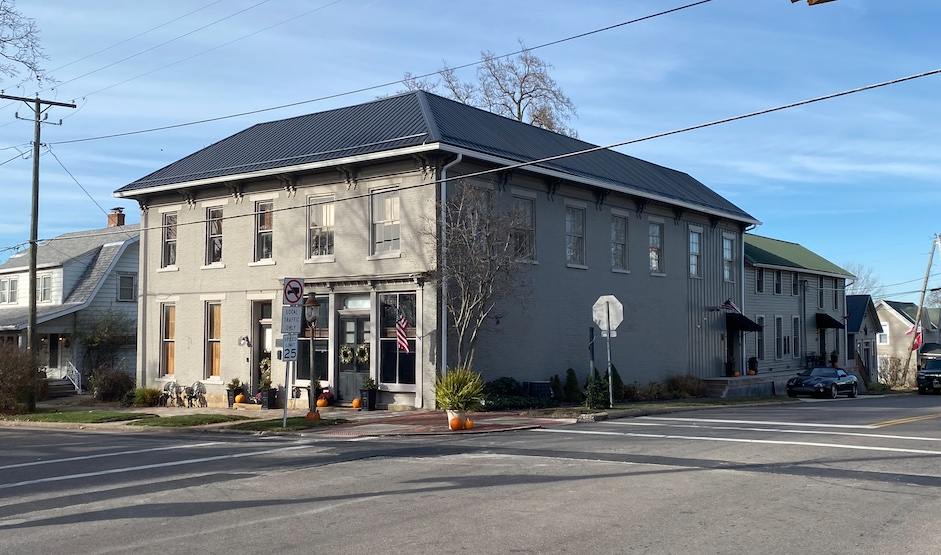
Built c.1850s this commercial building in Rushville, OH was once used to store and dry tobacco in the early 19th century. It was later used as a carpentry and cabinet shop and funeral home.
