= Could've Been =

Could've Been may refer to:

- "Could've Been" (H.E.R. song)
- "Could've Been" (Tiffany song)

== See also ==
- "Coulda Been", a song by Kimberley Locke
- Coulda Been, a media brand by Druski
