= Based on a True Story (Kimberley Locke album) =

Studio album by Kimberley Locke
- Released: May 1, 2007
- Recorded: 2005–07
- Studio: Studio Atlantis, Record Plant Mobile and Jon's Studio (Los Angeles, California); Central Command Studios and MixingLab (Hollywood, California); Glorified Mono Studio and Oxford Sound (Nashville, Tennessee)
- Genre: Adult contemporary, pop, R&B
- Length: 43:04
- Label: Curb
- Producer: Mike Curb; Mark J. Feist; Matthew Gerrard; Michael Lloyd; Dan Muckala; Damon Sharpe

Kimberley Locke chronology
One Love (2004)	Based on a True Story (2007)	Christmas (2007)

Singles from Based on a True Story
- 1. "Change" Released: January 15, 2007; 2. "Band of Gold" Released: August 13, 2007; 3. "Fall" Released: February 25, 2008

Based on a True Story is the second studio album by American Idol finalist Kimberley Locke. The album was released on May 1, 2007, by Curb Records. Locke chose this title because the songs on the album, eight of which were co-written by her, tell the story of the emotions she dealt with during and after her relationship with her ex-fiancé. She found that when she sat and talked with her collaborators about the issues she was working through, the songs began to write themselves.

== Background and recording ==
Locke co-wrote ten of the album's songs, which she described as a "very personal and confessional" process.

== Composition ==
According to AllMusic's Andy Kellman, Based on a True Story is a pop album with influences from country, rock, and adult contemporary. Kellman cited the track "Doin' It Tonight" as an example of "urban-oriented dance-pop". Jonathan Bernstein of Entertainment Weekly the songs "Any Which Way" and "Everyday Angels" as a "lurching rocker" and an "Oprah-ready anthem of gratitude", respectively. He described the single "Change" as a "cathartic country ballad". Locke covers Freda Payne's 1970 single "Band of Gold" as a bonus track; she performed the song as a contestant on American Idol, along with Frenchie Davis. Bernstein wrote that Locke provides "a reverent cover of a chestnut".

== Critical reception ==
Professional ratings
Review scores
Source	Rating
Allmusic	link
Billboard	link
Entertainment Weekly	(C) link
USA Today	3/4 stars

Gordon Ely of Billboard praised it as "powerfully performed and perfectly presented", and referred to Locke as "a major new artist in the making". Kellman praised the album as a "polished, professional set", though he felt the songs were "samey and not all that memorable". Despite his positive response to Locke's experimentation with musical genres, Bernstein wrote that she "fails to inject personality into these songs".

== Track listing ==
No.	Title	Writer(s)	Length
1.	"Change"	Kimberley Locke, Jess Cates, Dennis Matkosky, Ty Lacy	3:56
2.	"Any Which Way"	Louis Biancaniello, Sam Watters, Adam Anders	3:44
3.	"Trust Myself"	Locke, Bridget Benenate, Matthew Gerrard	3:22
4.	"Supawoman"	Locke, Damon Sharpe, Mark J. Feist	3:57
5.	"Doin' It Tonite"	Locke, Sharpe, Feist	3:11
6.	"Friend Like You"	Locke, Sharpe, Feist	2:57
7.	"Fall"	Sonny Lemaire, Shane Minor, Clay Mills	3:32
8.	"I Don't Wanna Know"	Locke, Benenate, Gerrard	4:00
9.	"Talk About Us"	Locke, Denise Rich, Genzo	3:14
10.	"You Don't Have To Be Strong"	Jud Friedman, Allan Rich	3:26
11.	"Everyday Angels"	Locke, Danielle Brisebois, Wayne Rodrigues	4:22
12.	"Band of Gold"	Edythe Wayne, Ronald Dunbar	3:01

=== Cut tracks ===
Only a month before the release of the album, a decision was made for Kimberley to record her versions of "Fall" and "Band of Gold". The label was so impressed by these recordings that two songs that had previously been recorded, "What I Gotta Do" and "Hey DJ (Let That Song Play)", were cut from the album. They remain unreleased.

== Personnel ==
- Kimberley Locke – vocals, backing vocals (1–3, 11)
- Dan Muckala – keyboards (1–3, 11), acoustic piano (1), drum programming (11)
- Mark J. Feist – keyboards (4–6, 9, 10), acoustic piano (4, 5, 9, 10), synthesizers (4, 5, 9, 10), Moog bass (4, 5, 9), MIDI programming (4, 5, 9, 10), live drums (5, 6, 10), synthesizer programming (6), live bass (6, 10)
- Jim Cox – keyboards (7, 12)
- Michael Lloyd – keyboards (7, 12)
- John D'Andrea – programming (7)
- Matthew Gerrard – keyboards (8), guitars (8), bass (8)
- Marco Luciani – keyboards (8)
- Chuck Butler – guitars (1–3, 11)
- Adam Lester – guitars (2, 3)
- Emerson Swinford – guitars (6, 9)
- Laurence Juber – guitars (7, 12)
- Tim Pierce – guitars (7, 12)
- Sergio Ponzo – guitars (10)
- Brent Milligan – bass (1)
- Adam Anders – bass (2, 3)
- Matt Bissonette – bass (7, 12)
- Dan Needham – drums (1–3)
- John Ferraro – drums (7, 12)
- Randy Cooke – drums (8)
- Lisa Cochran – backing vocals (1–3, 11)
- Julia Waters Tillman – backing vocals (7, 12)
- Maxine Waters Willard – backing vocals (7, 12)
- Oren Waters – backing vocals (7, 12)
- Bridget Benenate – backing vocals (8)
- Shadz of U (Chandra Boone, Nacole Robb and Selina Robb) – choir (11)

=== Production ===
- Kimberley Locke – executive producer
- Jerry J. Sharell – executive producer, management for Sharell Management
- Bryan Stewart – executive producer, A&R
- Dan Muckala – producer (1–3, 11)
- Mark J. Feist – producer (4–6, 9, 10), rhythm and vocal arrangements (4–6, 9, 10)
- Damon Sharpe – producer (4–6, 9, 10), vocal arrangements (4–6, 9, 10)
- Mike Curb – producer (7, 12)
- Michael Lloyd – producer (7, 12), arrangements (7, 12)
- Matthew Gerrard – producer (8)
- John D'Andrea – arrangements (7, 12)
- Mike Lloyd II – production assistant (7, 12)
- John Ozier – A&R coordinator
- Glenn Sweitzer for Fresh Design – art direction, design
- Roman White – cover photography
- Roberto D'Este – all other photography
- Dean Banowetz – hair
- Ryan Randall – hair (cover photo)
- Justin Henry – make-up
- Neil Robison – make-up (cover photo)
- Neil Rogers – stylist

Technical credits

- Gavin Lurssen – mastering at Lurssen Mastering (Hollywood, California)
- Steve Bishir – recording (1–3, 11)
- Dan Muckala – recording (1–3, 11)
- Jeremy Luzier – mixing (2, 3, 11)
- Jon Gass – recording (4, 5), mixing (4–6, 9, 10)
- Mark J. Feist – recording (4–6, 9, 10)
- Damon Sharpe – recording (4–6, 9, 10)
- Bob Kearney – engineer (7), mix engineer (12)
- F. Reid Shippen – mixing (7)
- Michael Lloyd – mixing (12)
- Michael Head – recording assistant (1–3, 11)

== Charts ==
=== Album ===
Year	Country	Peak	Sales	Certification
2007	USA	160	22,000	N/A

=== Singles ===
Charting year	Single	Charts	Peak position
2007	"Change"	U.S. Hot Dance Club Play ^{1}	1
2007	"Change"	U.S. Hot Adult Contemporary Recurrents	4
2007	"Change"	U.S. Hot Adult Contemporary Tracks	6
2007	"Change"	U.S. Top Dance Club Tracks of 2007^{1}	8
2007	"Change"	U.S. Top Hot Adult Contemporary Tracks of 2007	16
2008	"Band of Gold"	U.S. Hot Dance Club Play ^{1}	1
2008	"Band of Gold"	UK Commercial Club ^{1}	6
2008	"Band of Gold"	U.S. Hot Adult Contemporary Tracks	9
2008	"Band of Gold"	U.S. Hot Adult Contemporary Recurrents	19
2008	"Band of Gold"	Canadian Adult Contemporary	21
2008	"Band of Gold"	U.S. Top Hot Adult Contemporary Tracks of 2007	39
2008	"Band of Gold"	UK Upfront Club ^{1}	52
2008	"Fall"	U.S. Hot Dance Club Play ^{1}	1
2008	"Fall"	U.S. Hot Adult Contemporary Tracks	17

^{1} Remixed dance versions.
