= Up on the Housetop =

1864 Christmas song by Benjamin Hanby

"Up on the Housetop" is a Christmas song written by Benjamin Hanby in 1864. It has been recorded by a multitude of singers, most notably Gene Autry in 1953.

== History ==
Up on the Housetop
The Airmen of Note, 2009, Jazz instrumental

According to William Studwell in The Christmas Carol Reader, "Up on the Housetop" was the second-oldest secular Christmas song, outdone only by "Jingle Bells", which was written in 1857. It is also considered the first Yuletide song to focus primarily on Santa Claus. It was originally published in the magazine Our Song Birds by Root & Cady. According to Reader's Digest Merry Christmas Song Book, Hanby probably owes the idea that Santa and his sleigh land on the roofs of homes to Clement C. Moore's 1822 poem, "A Visit from St. Nicholas" (also commonly known as "The Night Before Christmas"). Benjamin Russell Hanby was born in 1833 near Rushville, Ohio, the son of a minister involved with the Underground Railroad. He wrote "Up on the Housetop" while living in New Paris, Ohio. During his short life, he wrote some 80 songs before dying of tuberculosis in 1867. Other than "Up on the Housetop", his best-known song is "Darling Nelly Gray".

Benjamin Hanby, author of the Christmas classic.

== On television ==
In 1992, a syndicated television special of the same name, produced by Perennial Pictures Film Corporation in Indianapolis, Indiana, was released. Co-writer/co-producer/co-director G. Brian Reynolds also was the voice of Curtis Calhoun, and also composed the musical score. His creative partner, Russ Harris, co-wrote, co-produced, co-directed and also did voiceover work in this special. The special is the story of Curtis Calhoun, a miserable man who wishes that there were no Santa Claus. But then on Christmas Eve, someone is on top of the Calhouns' roof, and Curtis does not know whether he is Saint Nick or a cat burglar.

== Kimberley Locke version ==
"Up on the Housetop"

Single by Kimberley Locke

from the album Christmas
- Released: 2005
- Label: Curb Records
- Songwriter(s): Benjamin Hanby
- Producer(s): Mike Curb, Michael Lloyd

Kimberley Locke singles chronology
"I Could" (2005)	"Up on the Housetop" (2005)	"Jingle Bells" (2006)

In 2005, the song was repopularized with a new recording by Kimberley Locke. The recording broke a Billboard record when it made the largest leap into the Top 5 in the AC chart's history, moving from 32 to 5 in only a week. It was also the second longest Billboard holiday AC chart topper in the chart's history, sitting at number 1 for 4 consecutive weeks.

Kimberley Locke Version
Chart (2005/2006)	Peak Position
US Adult Contemporary	1
Hot Adult Contemporary Recurrents	15

=== Year-end charts ===
Chart (2006)	Position
US Adult Contemporary	36

== See also ==
- List of Billboard Adult Contemporary number ones of 2005 and 2006 (U.S.)
