= Sara Weiss =

American spiritualist and author (d. 1904)

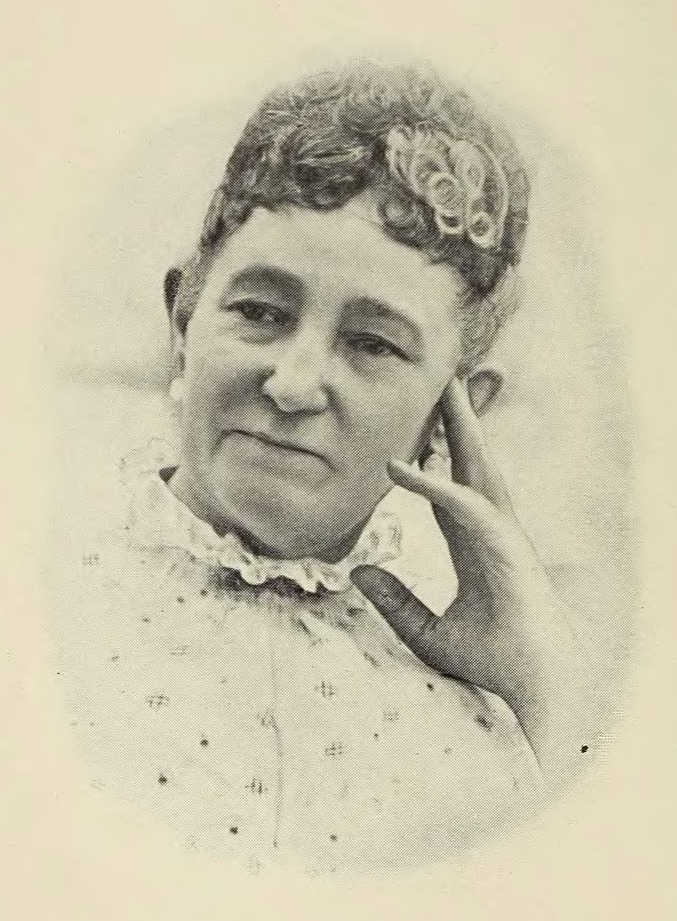
- Born: Sarah Ditto McBride Rushville, Ohio, USA
- Died: 23 March 1904 St. Louis, Missouri, USA
- Notable works: Journeys to the Planet Mars or, Our mission to Ento (Mars): Being a Record of Visits Made to Ento (Mars) by Sara Weiss, Psychic, Under the Guidance of a Spirit Band, For the Purpose of Conveying to the Entoans a Knowledge of the Continuity of Life, Transcribed Automatically by Sara Weiss, Under the Editorial Direction of (Spirit) Carl De L'Ester (1903)

Sara Weiss (née Ditto McBride, died 23 March 1904) was an American spiritualist and author. She claimed that her debut work Journeys to the Planet Mars... (1903) was a factual work about Mars that had been communicated to her via psychic messages.

== Biography ==
Weiss' birth date is uncertain. She was born in Rushville, Ohio, to a farmer and had little formal education. She was married to A. M. Weiss, who outlived her.

Weiss was a spiritualist medium. She claimed that her debut work Journeys to the Planet Mars... (1903) was a factual work that had been communicated to her via psychic messages, from 6 October 1892 to 16 September 1894, which she wrote as an amanuensis. The book covered the history of a peaceful utopian society on the plant Mars and depicted a heroic Martian race which had advanced transportation and feats of civil engineering, such as canals. The book also included thirteen botanical drawings of "Martian flora" and a note about pronunciation of the Martian language. The book was intended to validate spiritualism.

Her second work Decimon Hûŷdas: A Romance of Mars... was published posthumously in 1906. This recounted the story of two lovers and described the Martian religion.

Weiss died in St. Louis, Missouri, on 23 March 1904.

== Publications ==
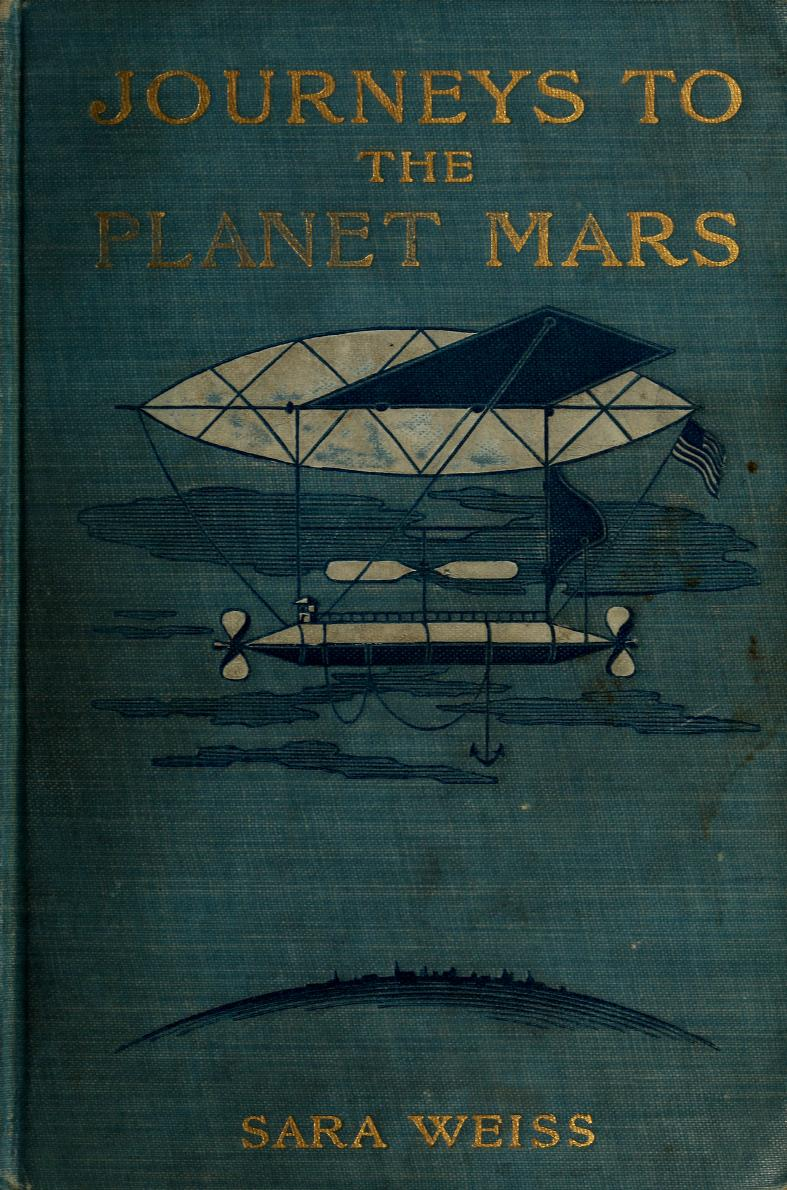
Cover of Journeys to the Planet Mars, 1903 edition by The Bradford Press

- Journeys to the Planet Mars or, Our mission to Ento (Mars): Being a Record of Visits Made to Ento (Mars) by Sara Weiss, Psychic, Under the Guidance of a Spirit Band, For the Purpose of Conveying to the Entoans a Knowledge of the Continuity of Life, Transcribed Automatically by Sara Weiss, Under the Editorial Direction of (Spirit) Carl De L'Ester (1903)
- Decimon Hûŷdas: A Romance of Mars: A Story of Actual Experiences in Ento (Mars) Many Centuries Ago, Given to the Psychic Sara Weiss and by her Transcribed Automatically Under the Editorial Direction of Carl De L'Ester (1906)
