= Rushville, Ohio =

- Village
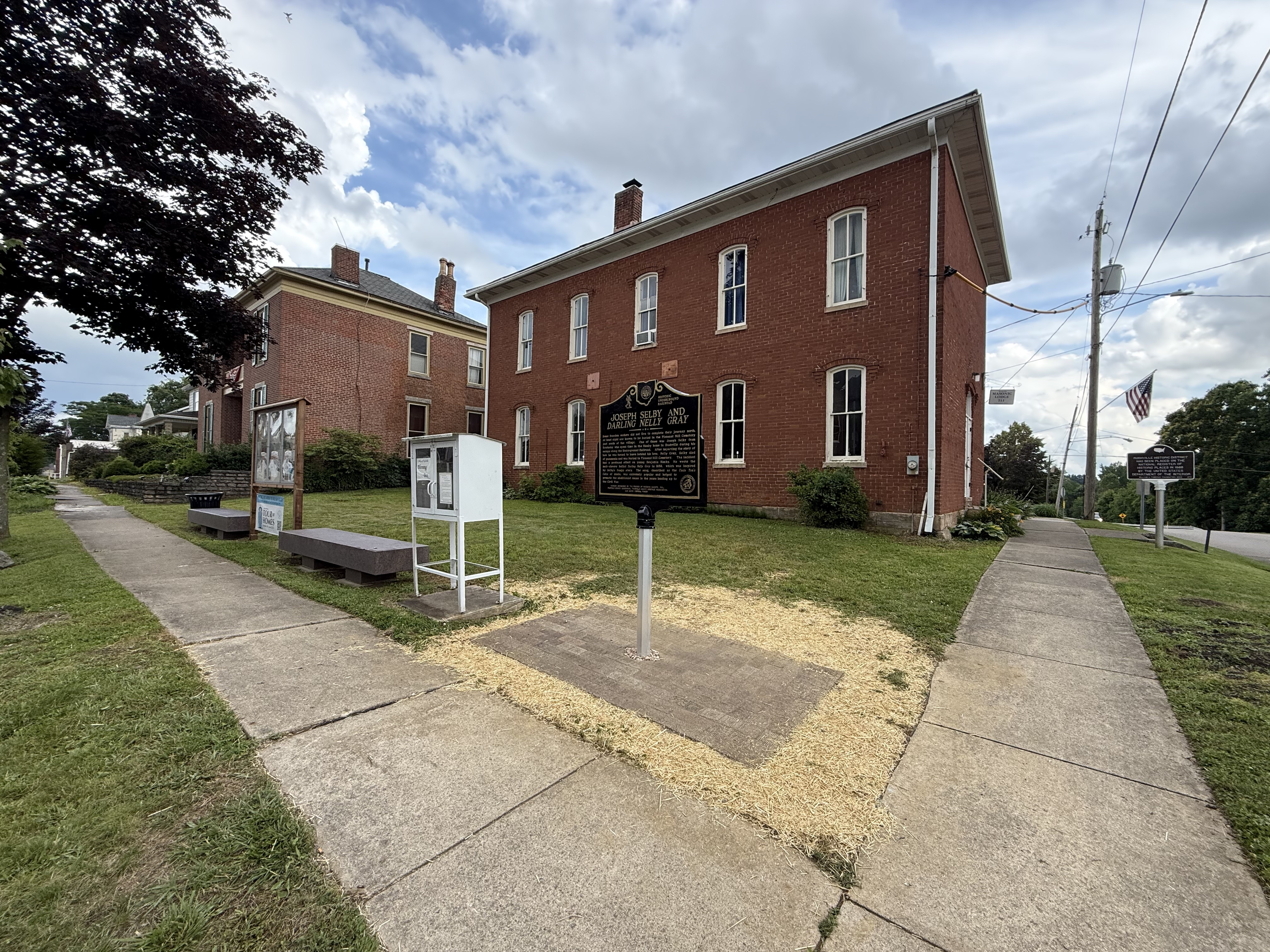
- Downtown Rushville Ohio

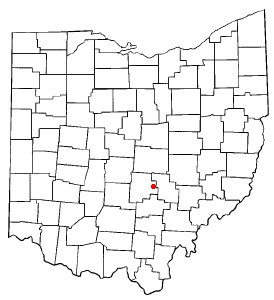
- Location of Rushville, Ohio

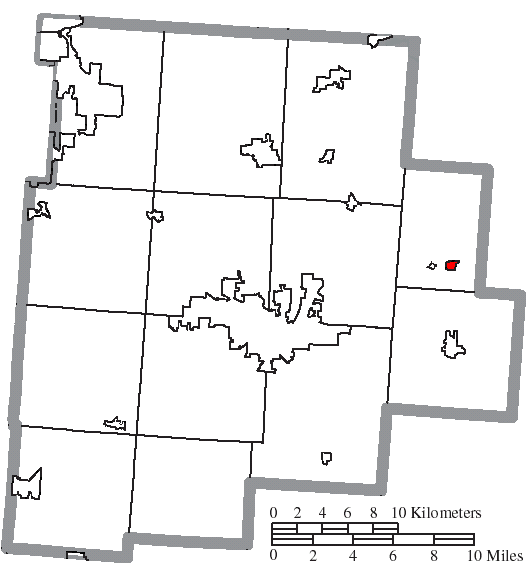
- Location of Rushville in Fairfield County
- Coordinates: 39°45′52″N 82°25′49″W
- Country: United States
- State: Ohio
- County: Fairfield

Area
  - Total: 0.24 sq mi (0.62 km^{2})
  - Land: 0.24 sq mi (0.62 km^{2})
  - Water: 0 sq mi (0.00 km^{2})
- Elevation: 1,056 ft (322 m)

Population (2020)
  - Total: 304
  - Density: 1,264.6/sq mi (488.25/km^{2})
- Time zone: UTC-5 (Eastern (EST))
  - Summer (DST): UTC-4 (EDT)
- ZIP codes: 43150
- Area code: 740
- FIPS code: 39-69204
- GNIS feature ID: 2399144
- Website: https://www.rushville-oh.com/

Rushville is a village in Fairfield County, Ohio, United States. The population was 304 at the 2020 census. Much of the village is listed on the National Register of Historic Places as the Rushville Historic District.

== History ==
Rushville takes its name from Little Rush Creek, which runs between the villages of Rushville and West Rushville. The town was founded in 1808 by Joseph Turner and became a prosperous stop along the old Zane's Trace road constructed in 1797 by Colonel Ebenezer Zane. Rushville was known as a stop on the Underground Railroad in the years prior to the Civil War. Several fugitive slaves who died in Rushville while seeking freedom in Canada are buried in the nearby Pleasant Hill Cemetery.

== Geography ==
According to the United States Census Bureau, the village has a total area of 0.24 square miles (0.62 km^{2}), all land.

== Demographics ==
Historical population
Census	Pop.	Note	%±
1870	221		—
1880	227		2.7%
1890	291		28.2%
1900	257		−11.7%
1910	246		−4.3%
1920	209		−15.0%
1930	201		−3.8%
1940	228		13.4%
1950	252		10.5%
1960	283		12.3%
1970	289		2.1%
1980	299		3.5%
1990	229		−23.4%
2000	268		17.0%
2010	302		12.7%
2020	304		0.7%
U.S. Decennial Census

=== 2010 census ===
As of the census of 2010, there were 302 people, 107 households, and 81 families living in the village. The population density was 1,258.3 inhabitants per square mile (485.8/km^{2}). There were 120 housing units at an average density of 500.0 per square mile (193.1/km^{2}). The racial makeup of the village was 96.0% White, 0.7% Asian, and 3.3% from two or more races.

There were 107 households, of which 44.9% had children under the age of 18 living with them, 52.3% were married couples living together, 14.0% had a female householder with no husband present, 9.3% had a male householder with no wife present, and 24.3% were non-families. 16.8% of all households were made up of individuals, and 4.7% had someone living alone who was 65 years of age or older. The average household size was 2.82 and the average family size was 3.12.

The median age in the village was 32.3 years. 30.5% of residents were under the age of 18; 9.5% were between the ages of 18 and 24; 31.9% were from 25 to 44; 22.9% were from 45 to 64; and 5.3% were 65 years of age or older. The gender makeup of the village was 47.4% male and 52.6% female.

=== 2000 census ===
As of the census of 2000, there were 268 people, 90 households, and 74 families living in the village. The population density was 1,183.4 inhabitants per square mile (456.9/km^{2}). There were 103 housing units at an average density of 454.8 per square mile (175.6/km^{2}). The racial makeup of the village was 97.01% White, 0.75% Native American, and 2.24% from two or more races.

There were 90 households, out of which 52.2% had children under the age of 18 living with them, 61.1% were married couples living together, 12.2% had a female householder with no husband present, and 16.7% were non-families. 14.4% of all households were made up of individuals, and 5.6% had someone living alone who was 65 years of age or older. The average household size was 2.98 and the average family size was 3.25.

In the village, the population was spread out, with 34.7% under the age of 18, 8.6% from 18 to 24, 33.6% from 25 to 44, 19.8% from 45 to 64, and 3.4% who were 65 years of age or older. The median age was 31 years. For every 100 females there were 98.5 males. For every 100 females age 18 and over, there were 96.6 males.

The median income for a household in the village was $33,750, and the median income for a family was $45,875. Males had a median income of $31,563 versus $25,417 for females. The per capita income for the village was $13,864. About 12.7% of families and 14.7% of the population were below the poverty line, including 16.5% of those under the age of eighteen and 66.7% of those 65 or over.

== Notable people ==
- Benjamin Hanby, abolitionist and composer who wrote the Christmas song "Up on the House Top" and the popular anti-slavery ballad "Nelly Gray (song)"
- Sara Weiss, spiritualist and author
