= Wrong (Kimberley Locke song) =

Single by Kimberley Locke

from the album One Love
- Released: June 2004
- Recorded: 2004
- Genre: Pop
- Length: 3:17 (album version); 3:07 (radio mix)
- Label: Curb Records
- Songwriters: Kaci Battaglia , Tiffany Arbuckle Lee, Matt Bronleewe
- Producer: Matt Bronleewe

Kimberley Locke singles chronology
"8th World Wonder" (2004)	"Wrong" (2004)	"Coulda Been" (2005)

"Wrong" is the second single from American Idol finalist, Kimberley Locke, from her One Love album. The song was written by Kaci Battaglia, Tiffany Arbuckle Lee and Matt Bronleewe. A dance remix by the remix team Bronleewe & Bose was later released on the iTunes digital single release.

== Track listings and formats ==
- US promotional single - CURBD-1871
1. "Wrong" (Radio Mix) – 3:07
2. "Wrong" (Radio Mix with lead guitar) – 3:07
3. "Wrong" (Plumb Radio Mix) – 3:10
- US digital single - "Wrong" (Remixes)
1. "Wrong" (Radio Mix) – 3:07
2. "Wrong" (Radio Mix with lead guitar) – 3:07
3. "Wrong" (Bronleewe & Bose Radio Edit) – 2:42

== Cover versions ==
Canadian pop singer Mandy Savoy released a version of "Wrong" in December 2007. The release featured remixes by dance producers Troy Morehouse and Gary Flanagan.

== Charts ==
Charts (2004)	Peak Position
Top 40 Mainstream	39

== Music video ==
The video for "Wrong" was directed by Urban Strom, who has also directed videos for Mary J. Blige, Rachel Stevens and LeAnn Rimes. The video was filmed in London, England in the spring of 2004.
