= One Love (Kimberley Locke album) =

Studio album by Kimberley Locke
- Released: May 4, 2004
- Studio: The Lealand House, Ocean Way Nashville, Sound Stage Studios, Masterlink Studio, Pentavarit and Cannibal Fish (Nashville, Tennessee); The Castle and The Bennett House (Franklin, Tennessee); Bananaboat Studios and Persona Studios (Burbank, California); Central Command Studios (Hollywood, California)
- Length: 45:36
- Label: Curb Records, EMI, Columbia Music, London Records
- Producer: Matt Bronleewe; Mark J. Feist; Guy Roche; Shaun Shankel; Damon Sharpe; Drew and Shannon

Kimberley Locke chronology
One Love (2004)	Based on a True Story (2007)

One Love is the debut studio album of American Idol contestant Kimberley Locke. According to SoundScan, total sales of the album is approximately 213,000 copies.

== Critical reception ==
Professional ratings
Review scores
Source	Rating
AllMusic	3/5 stars
One Stop Review	B−
Rolling Stone	2/5 stars

AllMusic's Stephen Thomas Erlewine noted how the record has elements of rhythmic dance pop from Kelly Clarkson's Thankful and adult contemporary from Clay Aiken's Measure of a Man, giving praise to Locke's vocal performance over a track listing that's more hook-filled than either of them, concluding that, "While that might not make for the most noteworthy of albums, it is a nice listen, and Kimberley Locke acquits herself well with this good-natured debut."

== Track listing ==
No.	Title	Writer(s)	Length
1.	"8th World Wonder"	Shaun Shankel, Kyle Jacobs, Joel Parkes	3:59
2.	"Have You Ever Been in Love"	Steve Booker, Steve Mac	4:17
3.	"Wrong"	Kaci, Tiffany Arbuckle Lee, Matt Bronleewe	3:17
4.	"I Could"	Kari Kimmel, Thad Beaty, Dan Muckala	4:20
5.	"Without You"" (featuring Clay Aiken)	Samantha Cole, David Foster, Richard Marx	4:31
6.	"It's Alright"	Rob Fusari, Balewa Muhammad, Falonte Moore, Jayne Digregori	3:19
7.	"Coulda Been"	Guy Roche, Shelly Peiken	3:45
8.	"Before"	Aaron Sain	3:54
9.	"You've Changed"	Kimberley Locke, Shannon Sanders, Drew Ramsey	3:23
10.	"Now I Can Fly"	Mark J. Feist, Damon Sharpe	3:47
11.	"I Can't Make You Love Me"	Mike Reid, Allen Shamblin	3:22
12.	"Somewhere Over the Rainbow"	Harold Arlen, E.Y. Harburg	3:45

=== International editions ===
On June 23, 2004, "One Love" was released in the Japanese market through Columbia Music Entertainment. It features the same track order as the American release, but includes two remixes of the lead single, "8th World Wonder" as bonus tracks (Hi-Bias radio edit and Elektrik Kompany radio edit).

Another version of the album was also released in the UK through London Records (and through WEA International for the rest of Europe) on August 9, 2004. It features the same songs as the original American release, however in a different order and with a different album cover.

== Personnel ==
- Kimberley Locke – vocals, backing vocals (1, 7, 10)
- Shaun Shankel – keyboards (1), bass (1), drum programming (1), arrangements (1, 2, 4), programming (2, 4), BGV arrangements (2)
- Jeremy Bose – programming (3)
- Guy Roche – programming (5, 7, 8, 12)
- Kamil Rustam – programming (5, 7, 8, 12), guitars (5, 7, 8, 12)
- Herman Jackson – organ (5, 12)
- Shannon Sanders – keyboards (6, 9), programming (6, 9, 11), trumpet (6, 9), backing vocals (9)
- Drew Ramsey – programming (6, 9, 11), guitars (6, 9), bass (6, 9)
- Mark J. Feist – keyboards (10), bass (10), drums (10), vocal arrangements (10)
- Kyle Jacobs – acoustic guitar (1), electric guitar (1)
- Paul Moak – electric guitar (1), guitars (2–4)
- Reggie Hamilton – bass (7, 12)
- Dan Needham – drums (1, 2)
- Lindsay Jamieson – drums (3)
- Will Sayles – drums (4)
- Darin James – drum programming (9)
- John Catchings – strings (11)
- David Davidson – strings (11)
- Jason Freese – horns (12)
- Phil Jordan – horns (12)
- Gabrial McNair – horns (12)
- Damon Sharpe – vocal arrangements (10)
- Kari Kimmel – backing vocals (1, 4)
- Jennifer Karr – backing vocals (2), BGV arrangements (2)
- Clay Aiken – vocals (5)
- Carmen Carter – backing vocals (5, 12)
- Dorian Holley – backing vocals (5, 12)
- Wendy Wagner – backing vocals (5, 12)
- Debreca Smith – backing vocals (6, 11)
- Denaine Jones – backing vocals (7)

=== Production ===
- Kimberley Locke – executive producer
- Bryan Stewart – executive producer
- Shaun Shankel – producer (1, 2, 4)
- Matt Bronleewe – producer (3)
- Guy Roche – producer (5, 7, 8, 12)
- Drew and Shannon – producers (6, 9, 11)
- Mark J. Feist – producer (10)
- Damon Sharpe – producer (10)
- Glenn Sweitzer for Fresh Design – package design
- Ron Davis – photography
- Trish Townsend – wardrobe stylist
- Dean Banowetz – hair
- Mezhgan Hussainy – make-up
- Garry C. Kief and Jerry Sharrell for Stiletto Entertainment – management

Technical credits

- Tom Coyne – mastering at Sterling Sound (New York, NY)
- Shaun Shankel – engineer (1, 2, 4), digital editing (1, 2, 4)
- F. Reid Shippen – engineer (1), mixing (1–4)
- Bill Whittington – engineer (1, 2, 4), digital editing (1, 2, 4)
- Aaron Swihart – engineer (3)
- Paul Moak – engineer (4)
- Dushyant Bhakta – engineer (5, 7, 8, 12), mixing (5, 7, 8, 12)
- Mark J. Feist – recording (10)
- Adam Kagan – mixing (10)
- Julie Brakey – digital editing assistant (1, 4)
- Lee Bridges – digital editing assistant (1, 2, 4)
- David Streit – digital editing assistant (2)
- Rob Clark – assistant engineer (3)
- Jim Cooley – mix assistant (3)
- Rick Robbins – cuts editing (3)

== Sales ==
Album (North America)

Year	Country	Sales	Certification
2004	USA	213,000	N/A

In its first week the album debuted on the Billboard 200 chart at number 16 with 56,727 copies sold.

== Charts ==
=== Album ===
Charts (2004)	Peak position
U.S. Billboard Top Internet Albums	4
U.S. Billboard 200	16
U.S. Billboard Comprehensive Albums	16

=== Singles ===
Charting year	Single	Charts	Peak position
2004	8th World Wonder	U.S. Hot Singles Sales	1
2004	8th World Wonder	U.S. Hot Dance Singles Sales ^{1}	1
2004	8th World Wonder	U.S. Adult Contemporary	6
2004	8th World Wonder	U.S. Top Selling Singles of 2004	7
2004	8th World Wonder	U.S. Adult Contemporary Recurrents	10
2004	8th World Wonder	U.S. Top Adult Contemporary Songs of 2004	14
2004	8th World Wonder	Canadian Adult Contemporary	16
2004	8th World Wonder	U.S. Top 40 Mainstream	19
2004	8th World Wonder	U.S. Top 40 Tracks	29
2004	8th World Wonder	U.S. Adult Top 40	36
2004	8th World Wonder	U.S. Hot 100	49
2004	8th World Wonder	UK Singles Chart	49
2004	8th World Wonder	U.S. Hot 100 Airplay	61
2004	Wrong	U.S. Top 40 Mainstream	39
2005	Coulda Been	UK Singles Chart	90
2005	I Could	U.S. Adult Contemporary	8
2005	I Could	Canadian Adult Contemporary	18
2005	I Could	U.S. Top Adult Contemporary Songs of 2005	19

^{1} 8th World Wonder: The Remixes maxi-single.
