= We Need a Little Christmas =

Song written by Jerry Herman

Song by Angela Lansbury, Frankie Michaels, Jane Connell, Sab Shimono

from the album Mame (original Broadway cast recording)
- Released: 1966
- Label: Columbia Masterworks
- Songwriter: Jerry Herman

"We Need a Little Christmas" is a popular Christmas song originating from Jerry Herman's Broadway musical Mame, and first performed by Angela Lansbury in the 1966 production.

In the musical, the song is performed after Mame lost her fortune in the Wall Street crash of 1929 and decides that she, her young nephew Patrick, and her two household servants "need a little Christmas now" to cheer them up.

== Notable recordings ==
- Percy Faith with His Orchestra and Chorus (1966) (Christmas Is... Percy Faith)
- The New Christy Minstrels (1966) (Christmas with the Christies)
- Skitch Henderson & The Tonight Show Orchestra (1966) (Broadway Tonight! Skitch Henderson & The Tonight Show Orchestra Play Music From "Mame")
- Johnny Mathis (1986) (Christmas Eve with Johnny Mathis)
- The Muppets (1987) (A Muppet Family Christmas)
- Bugs Bunny & Friends with Daffy Duck (1994) (Have Yourself a Looney Tunes Christmas)
- Andy Williams (1995) (We Need a Little Christmas)
- Mormon Tabernacle Choir with Angela Lansbury (2001) (later appeared on the choir's 2006 album, The Wonder of Christmas)
- Andrea McArdle (2006) (Andrea McArdle's Family Christmas)
- Legacy Five (2007) (Little Christmas)
- Kimberly Locke (2007) (Christmas)
- Glee Cast (2010) (Glee: The Music, The Christmas Album and episode A Very Glee Christmas)
- Ages and Ages (2012) (Holidays Rule)
- Idina Menzel (2019) (Christmas: A Season of Love)
- Pentatonix (2020) (We Need a Little Christmas)
- Kelly Rowland (2020) (We Need a Little Christmas)

== Charts ==
=== Kimberley Locke version ===
Chart (2008)	Peak position
US Adult Contemporary	19

=== Glee Cast version ===
Chart (2010–11)	Peak position
Canada AC (Billboard)	15
US Adult Contemporary (Billboard)	15
US Holiday Digital Songs (Billboard)	16

=== Pentatonix version ===
Chart (2020)	Peak position
US Adult Contemporary (Billboard)	14
