= Change (Kimberley Locke song) =

Single by Kimberley Locke

from the album Based on a True Story
- Released: January 15, 2007
- Recorded: 2006
- Genre: Adult contemporary, hot AC, pop, dance
- Length: 3:58 (album version); 3:30 (AC edit)
- Label: Curb Records
- Songwriters: Kimberley Locke; Dennis Matkosky; Jess Cates; Ty Lacy
- Producer: Dan Muckala

Kimberley Locke singles chronology
"Jingle Bells" (2006)	"Change" (2007)	"Band of Gold" (2007)

"Change" is a song by American singer-songwriter Kimberley Locke, taken from her second studio album, Based on a True Story (2007), after plans on promoting Supawoman as the lead single were canceled. Locke was finalist on American Idol. "Change" was released as the album's first single on January 15, 2007, by Curb Records. Kimberley, Jess Cates with the assistance of Ty Lacy and Dennis Matkosky (LeAnn Rimes, Keith Urban), wrote the song about the crossroads Locke reached when deciding whether or not to call off her engagement in 2005. The song was produced by Dan Muckala. It topped the US Dance Club Songs chart on the week of June 9, 2007 and peaked at number six on the Adult Contemporary chart on the week of July 7, 2007. The music video was filmed in Nashville, Tennessee on January 9, 2007, by director Roman White.

== Track listings and formats ==
- US promotional single - CURBD-2011
1. "Change" (AC Edit) – 3:30
2. "Change" (Album Version) – 3:58
- US promotional single - CURBD-2031
1. "Change" (Radio Edit) – 3:54
2. "Change" (Jason Nevins Dance Radio Edit) – 3:57
- UK promotional maxi single - Almighty Remixes
1. "Change" (Almighty 7" Radio Mix) – 4:09
2. "Change" (Almighty 12" Mix) – 7:38
3. "Change" (Almighty Dub) – 7:37
- US single - iTunes exclusive
1. "Change" (Album Version) – 3:58
2. "Change" (Jason Nevins Dance Pop Edit) – 3:57
3. "Change" (Jason Nevins Dance Radio Edit) – 3:57
- US Remixes Maxi-Single - iTunes exclusive
1. "Change" (Jason Nevins Club Radio Edit) – 3:59
2. "Change" (Scotty K Radio Edit) – 3:26
3. "Change" (Bronleewe & Bose Radio Edit) – 3:26
4. "Change" (Almighty Radio Edit) – 4:11
5. "Change" (Jason Nevins Extended Club Mix) – 7:22
6. "Change" (Almighty Extended Mix) – 7:40
7. "Change" (Scotty K Vocal Klub Mix) – 6:51
8. "Change" (Bronleewe & Bose Club Mix) – 5:42

== Charts ==
Charts (2007)	Peak position
Hot Dance Club Play^{1}	1
Hot Adult Contemporary Recurrents	4
Hot Adult Contemporary Tracks	6
Top Dance Club Singles of 2007^{1}	8
Top AC Singles of 2007	16

^{1} Remixed dance versions.

== Music video ==
The music video of the song was filmed in Nashville, Tennessee on January 9, 2007, and was directed by award-winning director Roman White. Roman has directed videos for such artists as Carrie Underwood ("Jesus, Take the Wheel", "Before He Cheats", "Don't Forget to Remember Me"), Hootie and the Blowfish ("One Love"), and Lonestar ("Mr. Mom"). The video debuted on February 7, 2007, on AmericanIdol.com and was added into rotation on VH1 on April 14. The video follows Kimberley walking alone through the city on a cold winter's night. A promotional dance remixed version of the video was also produced and distributed to danceclubs.

== See also ==
- Number-one dance hits of 2007 (USA)
