= Mark J. Feist =

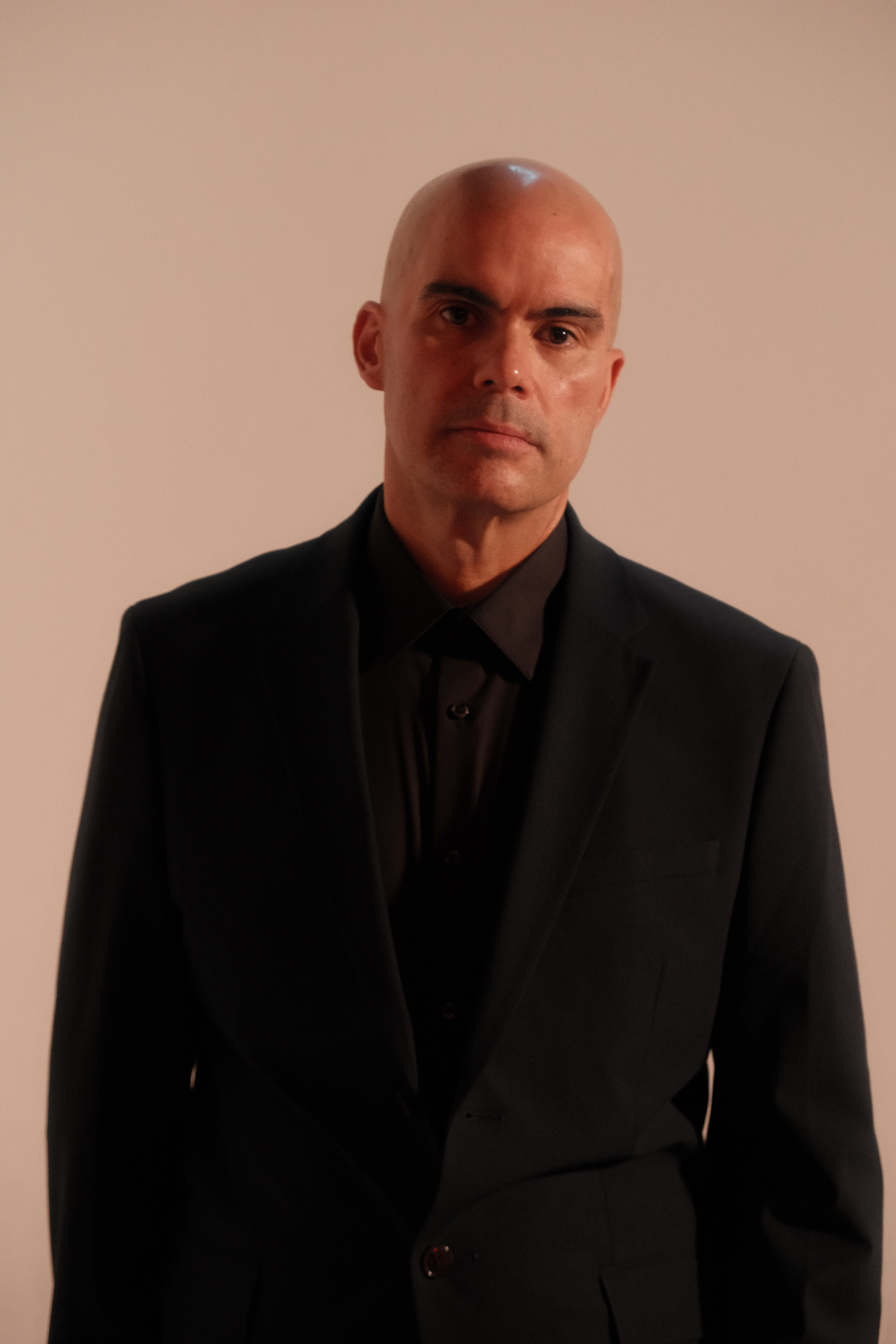

Background information
- Origin: Australia
- Genres: R&B, Pop
- Occupations: Record Producer, Songwriter, Executive
- Years active: 1990-present
- Label: Hitmakers Entertainment
- Website: hitmakersentertainment.com

Mark J. Feist is an Australian-born, American-based multi-platinum record producer, songwriter, and the founder and CEO of Hitmakers Entertainment (HME). With a career spanning over three decades, Feist has contributed to the sale of more than 35 million units worldwide. His production and songwriting credits include global icons such as Destiny’s Child, Beyoncé, John Legend, Celine Dion, and Jennifer Lopez, among others.

Originally gaining prominence in the Asian markets during his teenage years, Feist later transitioned to the United States, where he notably co-wrote and produced the Billboard Top 10 hit "Emotion" for Destiny's Child's multi-platinum #1 album, Survivor. Currently, through Hitmakers Entertainment, Feist serves as the executive producer and songwriter for the label's roster, where he co-writes and performs as a multi-instrumentalist on the label's releases. This includes the artist Tash (Tash Palmer), who has achieved over 80 million streams under his production.

== Early Life and Heritage ==
Feist was born in Melbourne, Australia, into a prominent musical family. He is the nephew of Filipino singer and entertainer Pilita Corrales, known as "Asia's Queen of Songs." Feist began musical training early in life, starting drum lessons at age two and transitioned to piano at age six. By age 13, he worked as a professional session drummer and pianist, performing on commercial recording sessions for jingles in Australia.

At age 18, Feist moved to the Philippines, marking the start of his international career as a professional producer and songwriter. He achieved his first hit record in the Filipino market that same year. Between the ages of 18 and 24, Feist produced and wrote over 40 gold and platinum albums across Asian markets, primarily in Japan, the Philippines, and Malaysia. During this period, he also collaborated on commercial projects and jingles for various global corporations across the Southeast Asian market, like Pepsi, Bristol Myers Squibb, and Procter & Gamble.

== Production and songwriting career ==
In 1994, Feist permanently relocated to Los Angeles to establish his career in the United States. In 1998, he wrote and produced the song "I Love You" for Keith Washington and Chanté Moore. This led to further collaborations with industry artists across several genres.

Feist’s career is marked by his "hands-on" approach to production; he frequently serves as a multi-instrumentalist, playing keyboards, drums, and bass, while handling musical arrangements and synth programming for his sessions.

=== Major collaborations and Billboard success ===
Feist is notably credited for his work with Destiny’s Child on their multi-platinum albums Survivor and #1's. He co-wrote and produced "Emotion," which reached the Top 10 on the Billboard Hot 100 in the US and hit #1 on various global charts and Billboard sales rankings. During this period, he also formed the production partnership DNM Worldwide, contributing to the #1 Billboard hit "Love Don't Cost a Thing" for Jennifer Lopez.

His production and songwriting discography spans several decades and multiple genres, featuring work with:

- Pop & R&B: Beyoncé, Celine Dion, John Legend, and Jennifer Lopez.
- Urban & Hip Hop: Mary J. Blige (Think Like a Man Too), Outkast, Mýa, Kelly Rowland, Jesse Powell ('Bout It), Tash (Tash Palmer), Shanice Wilson, and Donell Jones.
- Legacy & International: The Spice Girls, George Clinton, Jennifer Holliday, Brian Knight, Aaron Carter, and Stacie Orrico.
- Contemporary & Regional: Jay R, Regine Velasquez (Drawn), Jaya, and American Idol alumni Kimberley Locke, Jessica Sanchez, and Candice Glover.

=== Humanitarian projects ===
In 2005, Feist co-wrote and produced the charity single "Come Together Now" to benefit victims of the 2004 Indian Ocean earthquake and Hurricane Katrina. He co-wrote the track alongside Sharon Stone, Damon Sharpe, and Denise Rich. The project featured a collaborative cast of over 25 artists, including Celine Dion, The Game, and Wyclef Jean. Feist appeared on CNN's Larry King Live to promote the release, which was later included on the Hurricane Relief: Come Together Now album.

== Hitmakers Entertainment (HME) ==
In 2017, Feist transitioned from a "producer for hire" model to establishing Hitmakers Entertainment (HME), a full service independent record label, management company, and production house based in Los Angeles. Serving as the company’s CEO and primary creative director, Feist oversees artist development and production for HME. The company's operational model focuses on catalog building and long-term career development for its artists rather than short term viral targets.

=== Artist development and roster ===
Feist serves as the executive producer, songwriter, and multi-instrumentalist for the roster. This includes:

- Tash: An Australian artist who has released a catalog of over 80 songs under the HME label. Under Feist's production, Tash has achieved over 80 million collective streams.
- Jay R: Known as the "King of R&B" in the Philippines, Jay R maintains over 3 million monthly listeners on Spotify. He joined the HME roster following the release of the single "Sining" (with Dionela), which became the fastest song to reach 200 million streams in Philippine music history.
- Mönt Lee and Shanice: Emerging artists under the HME banner focusing on high detail production and vocal performance.

=== Global strategy and industry leadership ===
Feist was a featured speaker at the 2026 SXSW Conference in Austin, Texas. He was scheduled to participate in the panel "Owning Your Narrative: Global Strategies for Indie Artists," where he discussed the importance of creative control and long term artist development in the streaming era.
