= 8th World Wonder =

2004 single by Kimberley Locke

Single by Kimberley Locke

from the album One Love
- B-side: "Somewhere Over the Rainbow"
- Released: January 12, 2004
- Length: 3:59
- Label: Curb
- Songwriters: Kyle Jacobs; Joel Parkes; Shaun Shankel
- Producers: Shaun Shankel; Guy Roche

Kimberley Locke singles chronology
"8th World Wonder" (2004)	"Wrong" (2004)

Audio sample
- file; help

"8th World Wonder" is the first single by the American Idol finalist Kimberley Locke from her first studio album, One Love (2004). The single, written by Joel Parkes, Shaun Shankel and Kyle Jacobs, was nominated in the category for "Best Love Song" at the 2004 Teen Choice Awards. The release includes a new modern arrangement of Locke's signature song from the show, "Somewhere Over the Rainbow".

"8th World Wonder" is one of the longest-running Idol singles to appear on the Billboard Hot 100, spending 20 weeks on the chart and peaking at number 49. It was Locke's only single to chart on the Hot 100. Outside the United States, the song charted in the United Kingdom, also reaching number 49. In Entertainment Weekly magazine, "8th World Wonder" was listed as one of the top five songs to come out of American Idol.

== Music video ==
The video for "8th World Wonder" was directed by Sam Erickson. Locke stars in the video with Charles Divins from the soap opera Passions. The video starts with her waking one morning to find a note left by her boyfriend. It then shows each day backwards to seven days before when they first made eye contact at a party. The video ends with her giving him her number at the party at which they . A dance remix version of the video was also released.

== Track listings ==
US CD single

1. "8th World Wonder" – 3:59
2. "Somewhere Over the Rainbow" – 3:49

UK CD single

1. "8th World Wonder" – 3:59
2. "8th World Wonder" (Elektrik Kompany radio edit) – 3:30
3. "8th World Wonder" (Hi-Bias radio edit) – 3:35
4. "8th World Wonder" (video) – 3:59

== Charts ==
=== Weekly charts ===
Chart (2004)	Peak position
Scotland Singles (Official Charts)	50
UK Singles (Official Charts)	49
US Billboard Hot 100	49
US Adult Contemporary (Billboard)	6
US Adult Top 40 (Billboard)	36
US Dance Singles Sales (Billboard) The Remixes	1
US Mainstream Top 40 (Billboard)	19

=== Year-end charts ===
Chart (2004)	Position
US Adult Contemporary (Billboard)	14
US Adult Top 40 (Billboard)	96
US Dance Singles Sales (Billboard)	11
US Mainstream Top 40 (Billboard)	74

== Release history ==
Region	Date	Format(s)	Label(s)	Ref.
United States	January 12, 2004	Contemporary hit radio	Curb	
United States	January 26, 2004	Hot adult contemporary radio	Curb	
United Kingdom	July 19, 2004	CD	Curb; London	

== Cover versions ==
The Mexican singer Alessandra Rosaldo recorded a Spanish version of "8th World Wonder" entitled "La Octava Maravilla" on her 2009 album, Alessandra.
