= Kimberley Locke =

American singer and TV personality

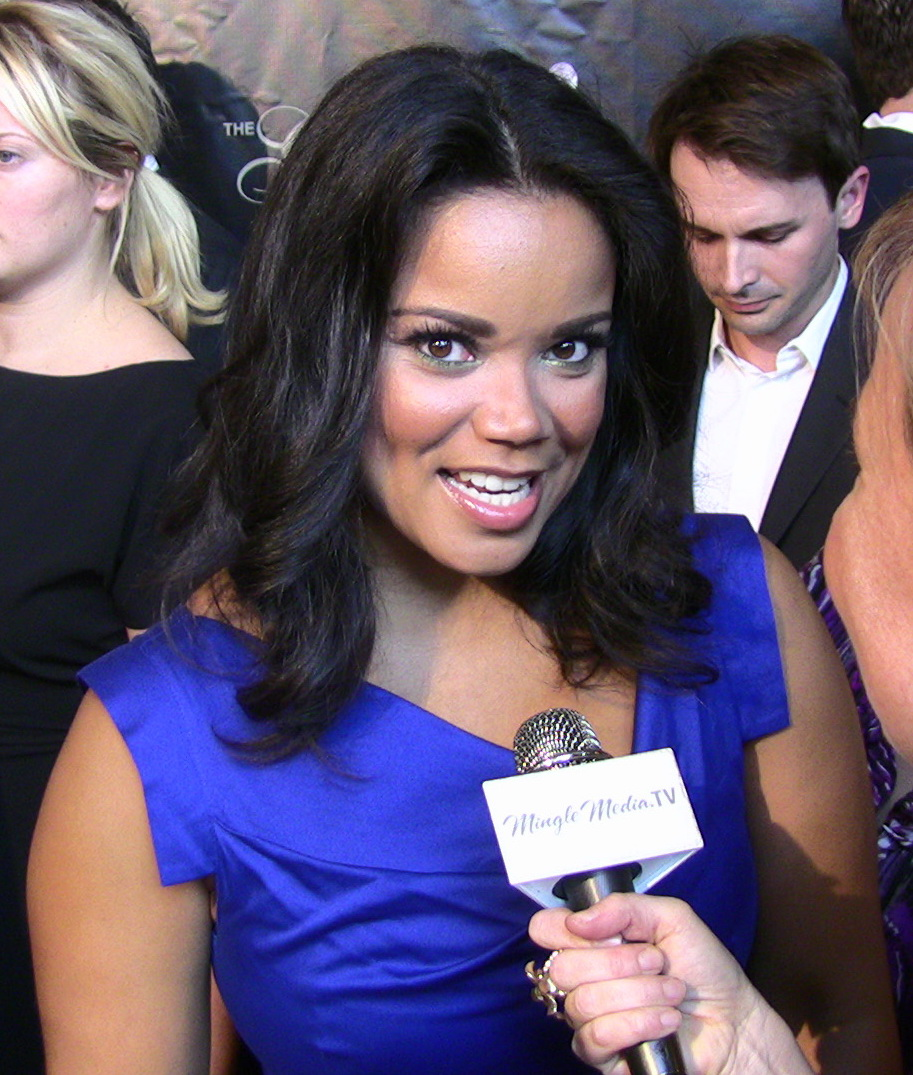
- Locke in 2011

Background information
- Also known as: Kim Locke
- Born: Kimberley Dawn Locke; January 3, 1978 (age 48); Hartsville, Tennessee, U.S.
- Origin: Nashville, Tennessee
- Genres: R&B, pop, dance
- Occupations: Singer, television personality
- Works: Full discography
- Years active: 2003–present
- Labels: Curb, Dream Merchant 21, I AM Entertainment
- Website: i-am-ent.com/kimberley-locke

Kimberley Dawn Locke (born January 3, 1978) is an American singer and television personality. She has recorded in the dance and pop genres, and has targeted the adult contemporary radio format. She was the cohost of the daytime talk show Dr. and the Diva.

Locke gained fame with her participation in the 2003 American Idol television series in which she placed third. In 2007, she garnered media attention for her participation in Celebrity Fit Club.

== Early life ==
Locke was born in Hartsville, Tennessee on January 3, 1978 to Donald and Christine Locke, the second of two children, with an older brother named Ashley. She and her brother spent most of their life in Gallatin. At age five, Locke began singing in church. Her parents divorced when she was eight.

Locke grew up admiring such singers as Janet Jackson, Whitney Houston, Patti LaBelle, and Diana Ross. She and childhood friends Chandra Boone, Selina Robb, and Nacole Rice formed a quartet as teens named Shadz of U, which performed at many local churches. The group later appeared on Locke's 2007 Based on a True Story album, singing backup on Everyday Angels.

Locke went to Gallatin High School, where she was one of 16 members to participate in its performing group. She remained in the group throughout her high school years. She was also selected twice as a member of the All-Middle State Chorus. After graduating, she began to work for a company in Nashville as an administrative assistant.

Like 2007 American Idol finalist Melinda Doolittle, Locke is an alumna of Belmont University in Nashville.

== Career ==
=== American Idol and singing career ===
On October 30, 2002, the reality TV singing competition American Idol held auditions in Nashville, Tennessee for the show's second season. Locke successfully passed through to the next round, and in December was chosen to perform on the show. She finished third, behind winner Ruben Studdard and runner-up Clay Aiken. She has since been invited back to the show to perform twice (seasons 3 and 7).

Locke went on to sign a record deal with Curb Records on September 6, 2003. Her debut album, One Love, was released May 4, 2004. Debut single "8th World Wonder" reached the top half of the Billboard Hot 100 and was successful on other charts, and entered the UK charts. "Wrong" and "I Could" followed as singles.

Locke released her version of "Up on the House Top" in the autumn of 2005 and by the end of year, it had reached the top spot of the Adult Contemporary (A/C) charts. The following year, Locke's version of "Jingle Bells" was released and topped the same charts. A full Christmas album entitled Christmas — only available digitally — was released on November 6, 2007.

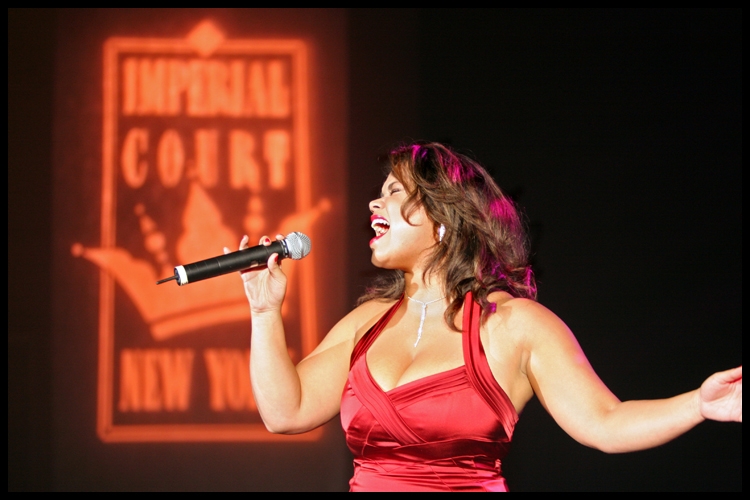
Locke performing in 2006

Locke's second album, Based on a True Story, was released on May 1, 2007. The album's original lead single, "Supawoman," co-written with her producers Damon Sharpe and Mark J. Feist, was released to radio on August 7, 2006. "Change," was released to radio on January 15, 2007. The album's next single was a cover of Freda Payne's "Band of Gold," which was released to radio on August 13, 2007, and became Locke's sixth solo A/C Top 10 hit. The album's third single,"Fall," co-written by Clay Mills and also recorded by country music artist Clay Walker, was released to radio in February 2008. All three singles from this album hit number one on the Billboard dance club chart.

After parting ways with Curb Records in 2009, Locke went on to be the first artist to sign a deal with Randy Jackson's Dream Merchant 21 record label and recorded the single "Strobelight", which was released April 6, 2010. as part of the "singles only" agreement about which Locke stated, "We live in a world where people go to iTunes and download the songs they want. "

In 2011, Locke issued a press release announcing her new entertainment company called I AM Entertainment. Her first independent release through her new company was her danced-themed EP album, "Four for the Floor", which was released on July 19, 2011. On November 1, 2011, Locke released a cover of Silver Bells which was accompanied by an I AM Entertainment produced music video. During the summer of 2011, fans chose via a Facebook voting campaign, which would be Locke's next single. The winning song was "Finally Free" which was released with a full remix package in 2012.

In 2013, Locke teamed up with British production team Cahill to release the single, "Feel the Love," on 3 Beat Records, that was promoted exclusively to the United Kingdom. The song reached number one on both the Club and Pop charts in the United Kingdom, and reached number 29 on Billboard's Global Dance chart.

In 2015, Locke began working on her next album which will feature songs she co-wrote with Bill Grainer.

In 2018, Locke released the single "Raise Your Hands." In 2019, she released "Sleep Tight Baby Bright," the first single off her upcoming album of lullabies.

In 2021, she released two more studio albums. Her first album of Children's music, You're My Baby, was released in May and her second album of Christmas music, Christmas Is Here, on which she teamed up with the band EMP3 was released in September. The title track from the album, a cover of a Donna Summer song was released as the lead single.

In 2023, Locke released a compilation album, Best of Kimberley Locke. The 16 track album features her singles, two previously unreleased songs, and two brand new recordings; including her new single Keep On (Falling in Love), which was produced by Dave Audé.

==== Songs performed on American Idol ====
List of songs
Round	Song choice	Original artist	Theme (if any)	Result
Audition	"Over the Rainbow"	Judy Garland	[N/A]	Advanced
Hollywood	"Band of Gold" (with Frenchie Davis)	Freda Payne	Group Performances	Advanced
Top 32	"Over the Rainbow"	Judy Garland	Semifinal Group 2	Advanced
Top 12	"Heat Wave"	Martha and the Vandellas	Motown	Bottom 3
Top 11	"Home"	Stephanie Mills	Movie Hits	Safe
Top 10	"I Can't Make You Love Me"	Bonnie Raitt	Country/Rock	Safe
Top 8^{1}	"It's Raining Men"	The Weather Girls	Disco	Bottom 3
Top 8	"My Heart Will Go On"	Celine Dion	Billboard Number One Hits	Bottom 3
Top 7	"New York State of Mind"	Billy Joel	Billy Joel	Safe
Top 6	"If You Asked Me To"	Patti LaBelle	Diane Warren	Safe
Top 5	"I Heard It Through the Grapevine" "Where the Boys Are"	The Miracles; Connie Francis	1960s Neil Sedaka	Safe
Top 4	"I Just Want to Be Your Everything" "Emotion"	Andy Gibb; Samantha Sang	Bee Gees	Bottom 2^{2}
Top 3	"Band of Gold" "Anyone Who Had a Heart" "Inseparable"	Freda Payne; Dionne Warwick; Natalie Cole	Random; Judge's Choice; Idol's Choice	Eliminated

- ^Note 1 Due to Corey Clark's disqualification, the Top 9 performances became Top 8 when no one was eliminated.
- ^Note 2 When Ryan Seacrest announced the results in the particular night, Locke was in the bottom two and declared safe when Josh Gracin was eliminated.

=== Television ===
While pursuing her music career, Locke was also interested in becoming a television star. Since 2005, Locke has been featured on many television shows.

In August 2004, Locke was invited to be a guest host on Good Day Live, and was invited back to co-host twice more. In 2005, she was a contestant on the game show, Family Feud, and she hosted Word Slam!, a GSN live game show; an accompanying documentary with Locke aired on that cable channel that September. Throughout the summer of 2005, a proposed reality TV series, Aren't You That Girl?, taped Locke's progress on her second album and preparations for her upcoming wedding. The engagement was later called off and the project was cancelled. During MTV's early fall 2006 lineup, Locke was a judge and co-host on the short-lived reality-show competition "Little Talent Show".

In 2007 Locke was a participant on the fifth season of Celebrity Fit Club. She has been the focused target of derision from fellow cast member Dustin Diamond, who has repeatedly insulted Locke. The ensuing argument caused all other contestants to leave the stage. On June 17, 2007, the season finale of Celebrity Fit Club aired, drawing in 2.7 million viewers, the show's highest yet.

Locke sat in as a guest co-host of The View in March 2007. In April 2008, she also appeared on "Don't Forget the Lyrics!" with her winnings to benefit Camp Heartland. She was the first contestant in the history of the show to attempt the million dollar song. Although unsuccessful, she was awarded $100,000 for ranking so well. Locke vowed she would raise the $400,000 she lost when she unsuccessfully attempted to win the million dollars.

On June 24, 2009, Locke became one of the hosts of the talent show Gospel Dream 2009 on Gospel Music Channel.

On September 11, 2010, Locke appeared on Celebrity Ghost Stories.

She has also hosted Windy City Live, The Better Show, and Word Slam. In 2013, she appeared as an expert judge on Next Great Family Band.

Locke cohosts Dr. and the Diva with Dr. Steve Salvatore. The daytime talk show began in the fall of 2019 and discusses health, food, fashion and fitness.

In 2020, Locke began co-hosting TV infomercials for kitchen appliances marketed by chef Emeril Lagasse.

=== Theatre ===
In 2019, Locke made her Broadway debut as a special guest of Kristin Chenoweth in her one-woman show Kristin Chenoweth: For the Girls.

The following year, she announced her own one-woman show called The Sum of All Parts which, as summarized by BroadwayWorld.com, "traces the intimate journey down her very own yellow brick road, from growing up bi-racial, to being involved with "American Idol," to finding herself in the music that flowed throughout her life". Backed by a 13-piece orchestra, she presented an evening of intimate storytelling of meeting some of her own idols and pays tribute to Etta James, Judy Garland and others.

In 2022, it was announced that Locke would make her musical theater debut, as the lead role in Summer: The Donna Summer Musical on board the Norwegian Prima. Locke plays Diva Donna, playing Summer as she reaches the height of her career. Of taking on the role, Locke stated "Donna Summer's inspirational story and pioneering talent led the way for so many of today's brightest vocalists. She has left an immeasurable impact on music and culture, and I am excited to bring her story to guests around the world aboard the beautiful Norwegian Prima."

=== Modeling career and weight loss ===
From 2005 through September 2006, Locke was signed with Ford Models' 14+ Division. She has appeared on the covers of the July 2005 issue of Figure magazine and the summer 2007 issue of UneQ magazine. She has also been a former spokesperson for Lane Bryant and Seven7 Jeans.

While filming for Celebrity Fit Club, Locke chose to follow the Jenny Craig diet plan and had great success. In December 2006, Locke was offered a deal as spokeswoman with Jenny Craig. At the completion of filming for the show, Kimberley weighed in at a final weight of 149 lbs; down a total of 27 lbs. from her original start weight of 176 lbs. A feature in the September 10th issue of People magazine shows Kimberley at 141 lbs., only three pounds away from her goal. Locke announced through her official MySpace blog on October 8, 2007, that she had finally achieved her 40-pound weight loss goal.

In January 2008, Locke was featured as the centerfold of Us Weekly's "Diets That Work" issue. The feature counted down the top five celebrity diets of 2007, with Locke being named the winner. Ellen DeGeneres was impressed by the feature and asked Locke to be a special guest on her daytime talk show. The episode taped on January 10, 2008, and aired the following day.

=== Business career ===
In 1999, Locke enrolled at Belmont University and graduated in August 2001 with a bachelor's degree of Business Administration in Management. In December 2006, Locke, with partners Eric Kupferberg, Liam Harvey, and Jim Stake, opened the Croton Creek Steakhouse & Wine Bar, located in Croton Falls, New York.

In 2011, Locke announced she had founded her own entertainment company called I AM Entertainment.

== Charitable work ==
Locke has been active in many charities, particularly in raising awareness of HIV/AIDS and breast cancer. Locke's first exposure to working with children living with HIV/AIDS was through her work with the Elizabeth Glaser Pediatric AIDS Foundation, which sent her on an 11-day trip through Africa. She then went on to work with other organizations such as YouthAIDS, the Davy Foundation, and Camp Heartland. In recognition of her extensive charitable efforts as an HIV/AIDS activist, Locke was presented with the Red Ribbon award on November 9, 2007. "The Red Ribbon Award is done for someone in the community that advocates AIDS awareness, and especially HIV awareness," said press liaison Chris Prouty. "They want to pinpoint one specific person and get the community involved in the accolades and a congratulatory celebration." At a news conference prior to her performance that night, Locke gave an acceptance speech. "All the kids [at Camp Heartland] have a great story, and that's what I've chosen to be a part of. It's the old cliché: kids are our future." She appeared on a Celebrity episode of Don't Forget The Lyrics to raise money for Camp Heartland, walking away with $100,000 for her charity. In March 2010, Locke was voted onto Camp Heartland's board of directors.

In October 2007, Locke teamed up with General Mills to introduce the Pink for a Cure campaign to promote awareness of breast cancer in the African-American community. "My aunt is a breast cancer survivor. So, as someone whose family has been directly touched by this disease, I'm very passionate about getting people talking more about their health," said Locke.

Locke is also a member of the Entertainment Council of Feeding America, the nation's leading hunger-relief organization.

== Personal life ==
Locke previously was engaged to her high school sweetheart Don Campbell. She also dated fitness trainer Harvey E. Walden for two years after meeting on VH1's Celebrity Fit Club.

In 2020, she announced her engagement to contractor Jason Ingraham. However, they ended their engagement in December 2021.

== Discography ==
- One Love (2004)
- Based on a True Story (2007)
- Christmas (2007)
- Four for the Floor (2011)
- You're My Baby (2021)
- Christmas is Here (2021)

== Videography ==
- "8th World Wonder" (2004), directed by Sam Erickson
- "Wrong" (2004), directed by Urban Strom
- "Coulda Been" (2005), directed by Urban Strom
- "Change" (2007), directed by Roman White
- "Silver Bells" (2011), directed by Adam Bergey and Eric Baldetti
- "Finally Free" (2012), directed by Walid Azami
- "Feel the Love" (2013), directed by Sameer Patel
- "The Christmas Waltz" (2017), directed by Rick DiMichele

== Awards and nominations ==
New Music Awards

- 2005: Nominated - Female Adult Contemporary Artist of the Year

Teen Choice Awards

- 2003: Nominated - Choice TV Reality/Variety Star - Female
- 2004: Nominated - Choice Love Song - "8th World Wonder"

== See also ==
- List of artists who reached number one on the U.S. Adult Contemporary chart
- List of artists who reached number one on the U.S. Dance chart
- List of artists who reached number one on the UK singles chart
