= Benjamin Hanby =

American composer (1833–1867)

- Benjamin R. Hanby
- Born: July 22, 1833; Rushville, Ohio, US
- Died: March 16, 1867 (aged 33); Chicago, Illinois, US
- Occupations: Composer, educator, pastor, and abolitionist
- Notable work: "Darling Nelly Gray", "Up on the Housetop", "Who is He in Yonder Stall?"

The Hanby House, c. 1905

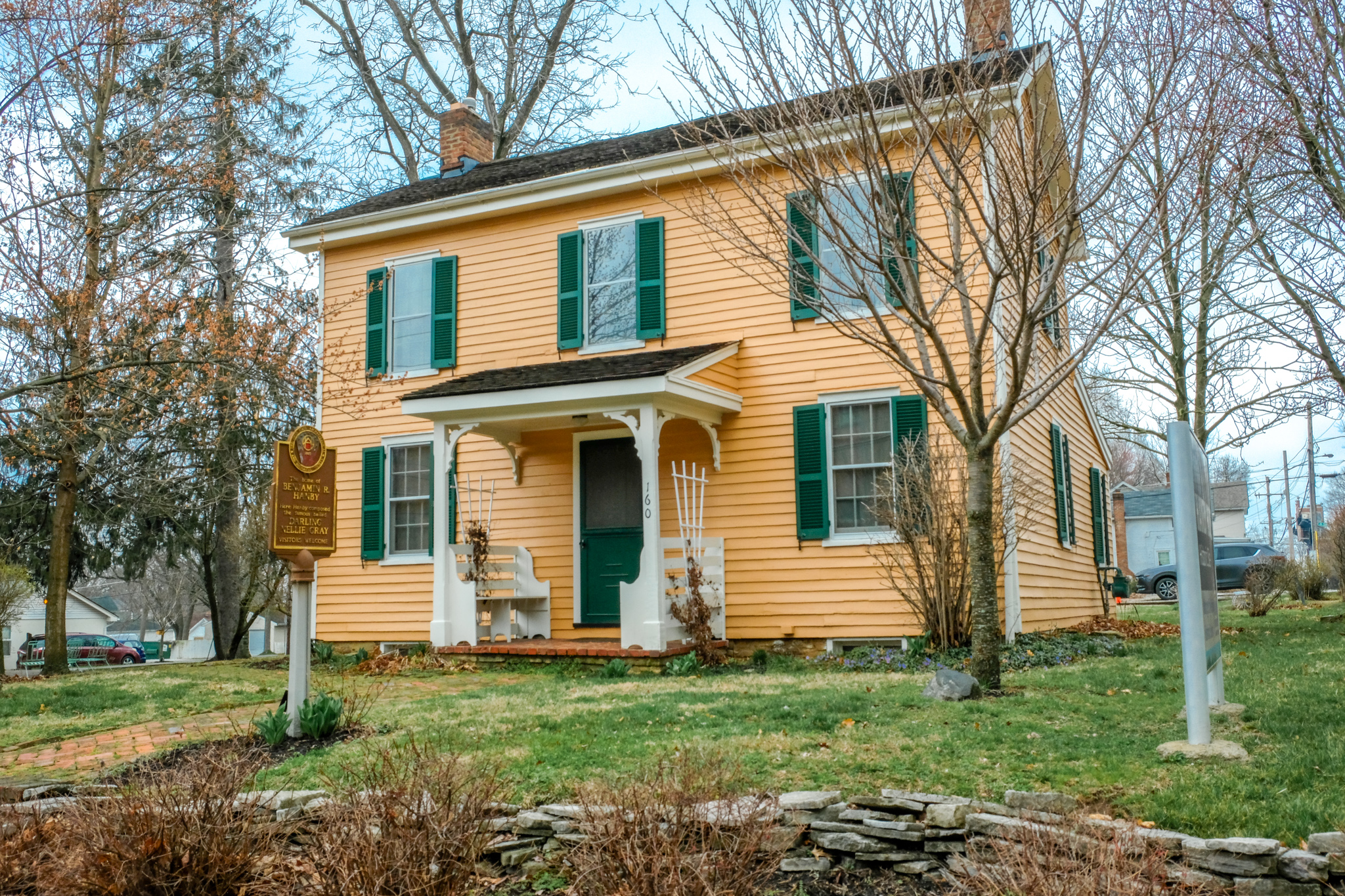
The Hanby House in 2020

Benjamin Russell (or Russel) Hanby (July 22, 1833 – March 16, 1867) was an American composer, educator, pastor, and abolitionist. He is known for composing approximately 80 songs and hymns, most notably "Darling Nelly Gray" and the Christmas songs "Up on the Housetop", and "Who is He in Yonder Stall?".

== Life and legacy ==
Hanby was born in Rushville, Ohio, on July 22, 1833. In 1849, he moved to Westerville to enroll at Otterbein University, and was later involved in the Underground Railroad. His father was Bishop William Hanby.

In 1856, at the Benjamin Hanby House, Hanby composed the popular anti-slavery ballad "Darling Nelly Gray", based on his encounter with Joseph Selby, a runaway slave from Kentucky who had died in the Hanbys' Rushville home. Hanby went on to write several other notable anti-slavery songs, including "Ole Shady", "The Song of the Contraband", and "Little Tillie's Grave".

After graduating in 1858, Hanby briefly taught school before becoming a minister in the Church of the United Brethren in Christ. In 1860, he became the principal of Seven Mile Academy in Seven Mile, Ohio.

By Christmas of 1864, after some time as a minister in a church in New Paris, Ohio, Hanby was operating a singing school in the town. Here, he composed "Up On The Housetop" as a Christmas sing-along, originally titled "Santa Claus". In 1865, Chicago-based publisher George Frederick Root published the song and brought Hanby to Chicago to pursue other ventures.

On March 16, 1867, Hanby died in Chicago from tuberculosis at the age of 33. He is buried in Otterbein Cemetery in Westerville. Today, the Hanby House is a museum managed by the Westerville Historical Society and owned by the Ohio History Connection.
