= Band of Gold (Freda Payne song) =

1970 single by Freda Payne

Single by Freda Payne

from the album Band of Gold
- B-side: "The Easiest Way to Fall"
- Released: February 1970
- Genre: Pop; pop soul
- Length: 2:53
- Label: Invictus
- Songwriters: Ron Dunbar; Edythe Wayne
- Producers: Brian Holland; Lamont Dozier; Eddie Holland

Freda Payne singles chronology
"Unhooked Generation" (1970)	"Band of Gold" (1970)	"Deeper and Deeper" (1970)

"Band of Gold"

Single by Charly McClain

from the album The Woman in Me
- Released: April 1984
- Recorded: 1983
- Genre: Country
- Length: 2:51
- Label: Epic
- Songwriters: Ron Dunbar; Edyth Wayne

Charly McClain singles chronology
"Candy Man" (1984)	"Band of Gold" (1984)	"The Right Stuff" (1984)

"Band of Gold"

Single by Belinda Carlisle featuring Freda Payne

from the album Belinda
- Released: 1986
- Genre: Pop
- Length: 3:42
- Label: I.R.S.
- Songwriters: Ron Dunbar; Edyth Wayne
- Producer: Michael Lloyd

Belinda Carlisle singles chronology
"I Feel the Magic" (1986)	"Band of Gold" (1986)	"Since You've Gone" (1986)

"Band of Gold"

Single by Bonnie Tyler

from the album Secret Dreams and Forbidden Fire
- Released: 27 May 1986
- Genre: Hi-NRG; rock
- Length: 5:40
- Label: Columbia
- Songwriters: Ron Dunbar; Edyth Wayne
- Producer: Jim Steinman

Bonnie Tyler singles chronology
"If You Were A Woman (And I Was A Man)" (1986)	"Band of Gold" (1986)	"Rebel Without A Clue" (1986)

"Band of Gold"

Single by Kimberley Locke

from the album Based on a True Story
- Released: August 13, 2007
- Length: 3:01
- Label: Curb
- Songwriters: Ron Dunbar; Edyth Wayne
- Producers: Michael Lloyd; Mike Curb

Kimberley Locke singles chronology
"Change" (2007)	"Band of Gold" (2007)	"Frosty the Snowman" (2007)

"Band of Gold" is a song written and composed by former Motown producers Holland–Dozier–Holland (under the pseudonym of Edythe Wayne) and Ron Dunbar. It was a major hit when first recorded by Freda Payne in 1970 for the Invictus label, owned by H-D-H. The song has been recorded by numerous artists, notably competing 1986 versions by contrasting pop singers Belinda Carlisle and Bonnie Tyler, and a 2007 version by Kimberley Locke.

The legendary songwriting team of Holland–Dozier–Holland used the name Edythe Wayne because of a lawsuit in which they were embroiled with Motown. Ron Dunbar was a staff employee and producer for Invictus. When they first offered the song to Freda Payne, she balked at the idea of recording it, as she thought the material was more appropriate for a teenager or very young woman (she was nearly 30 at the time). Payne reluctantly gave in after much persuasion by Dunbar. Almost immediately following its release, the Payne record became an instant pop smash, reaching number three on the US Billboard Hot 100, where it was certified Gold by the RIAA and number one on the UK singles chart, where it remained at the top spot for six weeks in September 1970.

After Holland-Dozier-Holland left Motown in 1967, they were still in contact with Motown's house band, The Funk Brothers and when they started their own recording company, with the intention of self-producing the songs they wrote, they asked the Funk Brothers to play on those songs.

Golden World/Motown session singers Pamela Vincent, Joyce Vincent Wilson, and Telma Hopkins provided the background vocals on the record. Wilson and Hopkins would later go on to form the group Tony Orlando & Dawn. Also singing in the background is Freda Payne's sister and future member of The Supremes, Scherrie Payne, who was also signed to Invictus at the time as a member of the group The Glass House.

The distinctive electric sitar part is played by Dennis Coffey. The lead guitar on the selection is performed by Ray Parker Jr., who later headed the team Raydio before becoming a solo recording artist in his own right.

In 2004, Freda Payne's "Band of Gold" was voted number 391 in Rolling Stone magazine's listing of the 500 Greatest Songs of All Time.

== Topic and controversy ==
The song tells a story which is open to a number of interpretations – based on the lyrics in the most commonly heard version of the song, which is the seven-inch single, the story is of a recently married woman whose husband is incapable of loving her (even though he tried), resulting in the couple sleeping in separate rooms on their honeymoon, to her dismay. It would appear that the marriage ended in the husband's abandoning his bride, leaving her with no more than the "band of gold" of the title (and the dreams she invested in it). Allusions to the husband either being impotent or gay have been suggested as the cause of the breakdown of the relationship. Robert Christgau, writing in The Village Voice, alluded to the song as being "about wedding-night impotence"; Steve Huey of AllMusic also deciphered the song as being about the man being impotent – "being unable to perform".

An earlier studio recorded version of the song includes some lyrics which were cut from the seven-inch single, which reveal the story as somewhat different. The couple were young, the girl was either a virgin or sexually inexperienced. She was still living at home ("You took me from the shelter of my mother"), the boy was her first boyfriend ("I had never known or loved any other"), and the relationship was probably unconsummated ("and love me like you tried before"). The couple rush into marriage and the relationship crashes on the wedding night, when the woman rejects her groom's advance ("And the night I turned you away”) emotionally wounding him, resulting in him leaving her. After the hurt she had caused, they spend their wedding night in separate rooms. She then expresses her regret at her mistake ("And the dream of what love could be, if you were still here with me").

According to Ron Dunbar, when interviewed in the documentary Band of Gold – The Invictus Story, he encouraged Freda Payne to learn the lyrics to the song despite her reluctance, Payne saying, "This makes no sense to me." Dunbar told her, "You don't have to like it, just sing it!" Dunbar continues: "I dubbed that tune 25, maybe 30 times just to get enough parts of it that we could edit to get the song."

Dunbar continued: "They said this song is a smash in the gay community. And I said, gay community? They said, yeah man, it's a smash. And I says, why is it that? And they said, well it's what the lyrics are saying. She said the guy couldn't make love to her so they figured he had to be gay! And I said oh no! And I remembered when they said that to me and I listened back to the song and there was a part in there... because I remembered when we were editing that tune, it was too long, so we had to cut a section out of the tune so the section we cut out of the song really brought the whole song [story] together."

The lyrics which Dunbar cut in the final edit which he was referring to were made to reduce the length of the single from three minutes 43 seconds down to the final two minutes 53 seconds. These were taken from the first verse – "And the memories of our wedding day, and the night I turned you away" – these were effectively substituted with, "And the memories of what love could be, if you were still here with me"; and a larger bridge – "Each night, I lie awake and I tell myself, the vows we made gave you the right, to have a love each night." – which is repeated again later in the song, cutting 18 seconds twice over from the song. With further refinements in the arrangements, including a heavier, richer bassline, and a different vocal take, a further 14 seconds were shaved off the final released seven-inch single.

== Other versions ==
- In November 1980, "Band of Gold" featured on the EP by The Reels; Five Great Gift Ideas from The Reels, side 2, track 3 on the Mercury label. It is a synthpop interpretation. The EP reached number 12 on the Australian charts (Kent Music Report).
- In 1983, "Band of Gold" was recorded by disco/hi-NRG singer Sylvester for his album Call Me on Megatone Records and released as a 12" single. Sylvester's version reached number 18 on the Billboard Hot Dance Club Play chart and number 67 on the UK Singles Chart.
- Also in 1983, country singer Charly McClain recorded a country version of "Band of Gold" for her album The Woman in Me. McClain's version reached number 22 on the Billboard Hot Country Singles chart in June 1984.
- Also in 1983, British band Modern Romance covered the song on their third album, Party Tonight. The song was also included as the B-side of the 12" version of their 1983 single "High Life". Their cover version of the song was produced by the band themselves with Richard Hartley, and remixed by Tony Visconti.
- In 1986, both Belinda Carlisle and Bonnie Tyler released their cover versions of "Band of Gold". Despite both coming off major hits and working with noted musicians, neither the Carlisle nor Tyler versions were especially commercially successful.
  - Tyler's "Band of Gold" cover was produced by Jim Steinman, the man behind earlier hits by Tyler and Meat Loaf, and later hits by Celine Dion, and the track was given a slew of Hi-NRG remixes. The song was the third single off Tyler's Secret Dreams and Forbidden Fire, which also featured the hit "Holding Out for a Hero". This version of "Band of Gold" reached number 81 in the UK, and did not chart elsewhere.
  - Carlisle's version was originally included on her Belinda album, but was revised for single release with Freda Payne adding prominent backing vocals. This newly-cut take on "Band of Gold" was a very minor hit in Canada, reaching number 91, but did not chart nationally elsewhere. Dance remixes of this track (also featuring vocals by Payne) met with some success on the US club scene.
- In September 2005, singer-songwriter Anna Nalick recorded "Band of Gold". Nalick would perform the song live, despite the fact that it would not appear on any of her studio efforts. It was later included for release as part of the Desperate Housewives soundtrack (Music from and Inspired by Desperate Housewives).
- Kimberley Locke released her version of "Band of Gold" to radio on August 13, 2007, as the second single from her album Based on a True Story. It became Locke's second single to hit number one on Billboard's Hot Dance Club Play chart and her seventh to go top 10 on the Hot Adult Contemporary Tracks chart. In December 2009, Billboard included Locke's version of the song at number 45 on their list of the top 50 Dance Club Play songs of the decade. Locke had previously performed the song alongside Frenchie Davis during "Hollywood Week" on the second season of American Idol, and later performed it again during her final performance week on the show.

== Charts ==
=== Weekly charts ===
==== Freda Payne version ====
Chart (1970–1971)	Peak position
Australia (Kent Music Report)	5
Australia (Go-Set)	6
Belgium (Ultratop 50 Flanders)	12
Belgium (Ultratop 50 Wallonia)	23
Canada Top Singles (RPM)	2
Ireland (IRMA)	1
Netherlands (Dutch Top 40)	7
Netherlands (Single Top 100)	5
New Zealand (Listener)	6
South Africa (Springbok Radio)	11
UK Singles (Official Charts)	1
US Billboard Hot 100	3
US Best Selling Soul Singles (Billboard)	20
US Cashbox Top 100	2
US Cashbox R&B	5
US Record World 100 Top Pops	1
US Record World Top 50 R&B	16
US Record World Juke Box Top 25	5

==== Bonnie Tyler version ====
Chart (1986)	Peak position
Eurobeat Charts (Record Mirror)	21
UK Singles (Official Charts)	81

==== Belinda Carlisle version ====
Chart (1986–87)	Peak position
Canada Top Singles (RPM)	91
US Dance Club Songs (Billboard)	26
US Dance/Electronic Singles Sales (Billboard)	38

==== Kimberley Locke version ====
Chart (2007–08)	Peak position
Canadian Adult Contemporary	21
UK Commercial Club	6
UK Upfront Club	52
US Hot Dance Club Play	1
US Adult Contemporary	9
US Billboard Top AC Songs of 2007	39
US Billboard Top AC Songs of 2008	36
US Billboard Top Dance Songs of 2008	11

=== Year-end charts ===
==== Freda Payne version ====
Chart (1970)	Rank
Australia (Kent Music Report)	15
Canada Top Singles (RPM)	39
Netherlands (Single Top 100)	92
UK Singles (OCC)	3
UK Singles (Record Mirror)	5
US Billboard Hot 100	10
US Cashbox Top 100	3
US Record World Top Record	12

== Certifications ==
=== Freda Payne version ===
Region	Certification	Certified units/sales
United Kingdom Physical 1970 sales	—	250,000
United Kingdom (BPI) Sales since 28 October 2006	Silver	200,000^{‡}
United States (RIAA)	Gold	1,000,000
Worldwide	—	2,000,000
^{‡} Sales+streaming figures based on certification alone.

== See also ==
- List of number-one singles of 1970 (UK)
- Number-one dance hits of 2008 (USA)
