= Coulda Been =

Single by Kimberley Locke

from the album One Love
- Released: February 1, 2005
- Recorded: 2004
- Genre: Pop
- Label: Curb Records (U.S.); London Records (U.K.)
- Songwriters: Kari Kimmel, Thad Beaty, Dan Muckala
- Producer: Guy Roche

Kimberley Locke singles chronology
"Wrong" (2004)	"Coulda Been" (2005)	"I Could" (2005)

"Coulda Been" is the third single from American Idol finalist, Kimberley Locke, from her One Love album. This is an enhanced disc which contains the music video for the single. Though originally plans were to release "You've Changed" as the third single in the USA while "Coulda Been" would be the third single in the UK, the label decided to release "Coulda Been" across the board. Although this was a fan favorite from the album, the single did not gain momentum on American pop radio stations and failed to chart, although it did become a minor hit in the UK. A dance remix by DJ Volume was released on iTunes and through a DJ service called Ultimix. A second remix by Joe Bermudez remains unreleased.

== Tracks ==
1. "Coulda Been"
2. "Before"

== Charts ==
Charts (2005)	Peak Position
UK Singles Chart	90

== Billboard review ==
The song received positive feedback from Billboard reviewer Chuck Taylor, who stated: "Almost a year after the release of her debut hit, the delightfully poppy "8th World Wonder," Kimberley Locke demonstrates her versatility (and, we hope, staying power) with the smooth, slinky "Coulda Been," long a fan favorite from her "One Love" disc. "

== Music video ==
The video for "Coulda Been" was directed by Urban Strom, who has also directed videos for Mary J. Blige, Rachel Stevens and LeAnn Rimes. The video was filmed in London, England in the spring of 2004. In the video, Kimberley sees another woman's name show up on her boyfriend's caller ID. She goes on to tell him that one day he will look back at what "coulda been" and regret letting her go.

== Release history ==
Release dates and formats for "Gone"
Region	Date	Format	Label(s)	Ref.
United States	March 1, 2005	Mainstream airplay	Curb	
