= Band of Gold: The Best of Freda Payne =

Compilation album by Freda Payne
- Released: November 7, 2000
- Genre: Pop, R&B
- Label: Castle Music

Freda Payne chronology
Lost in Love (2000)	Band of Gold: The Best of Freda Payne (2000)	Come See About Me (2001)

Band of Gold: The Best of Freda Payne is a 24-track collection of songs that were recorded by Freda Payne for Invictus Records. Originally from the United Kingdom, it was released in the United States as an import. This collection features ten songs from her album Band of Gold, seven from Contact, all four from The Best of Freda Payne, and only three from Reaching Out. Many of the songs were written by Holland, Dozier and Holland themselves, often using the pseudonym Edithe Wayne for copyright reasons. Inside the album cover is a biographical essay about Payne's life and career which concentrates mostly on her career with the Invictus label (she was an actress and a jazz singer as well) and was written in August 2000 by Geoff Brown of Mojo.

== Track listing ==
No.	Title	Writer(s)	Length
1.	"Band of Gold"	Edythe Wayne, Ron Dunbar	2:53
2.	"Unhooked Generation"	Craighead, Ron Dunbar	2:30
3.	"The Easiest Way to Fall"	Sheerie Lavette, Ron Dunbar, Edythe Wayne	2:34
4.	"Deeper and Deeper"	Ron Dunbar, Edythe Wayne, Norma Toney	3:02
5.	"I Left Some Dreams Back There"	Ron Dunbar, Norma Toney	3:16
6.	"Rock Me in the Cradle"	Greg Perry, General Johnson, Ron Dunbar	3:00
7.	"Love on Borrowed Time"	William Weatherspoon, James Dean	2:55
8.	"Through the Memory of My Mind"	William Weatherspoon	2:39
9.	"Now Is the Time to Say Goodbye"	Scherrie Payne	3:07
10.	"The World Don't Owe You a Thing"	Dees, Knight	2:56
11.	"Cherish What Is Dear to You (While It's Near to You)"	Brian Holland, Lamont Dozier, Angelo Bond	3:56
12.	"I Shall Not Be Moved"	Brian Holland, Lamont Dozier	2:43
13.	"Bring the Boys Home"	Greg Perry, Angelo Bond, General Johnson	3:29
14.	"You Brought the Joy"	Brian Holland, Lamont Dozier	2:55
15.	"You've Got to Love Somebody (Let It Be Me)"	William Weatherspoon, Raynard Minor	3:00
16.	"The Road We Didn't Take"	Brian Holland, Lamont Dozier, B. Dumas	4:18
17.	"He's in My Life"	Ron Dunbar, Edythe Wayne	3:44
18.	"Come Back"	Brian Holland, Lamont Dozier	2:48
19.	"Just a Woman"	William Weatherspoon, Raynard Miner, Dean	2:30
20.	"How Can I Live Without My Life"	Brian Holland, Lamont Dozier	2:50
21.	"You're the Only Bargain I've Got"	Edythe Wayne, Ron Dunbar, General Johnson	3:39
22.	"Two Wrongs Don't Make a Right"	Brian Holland, Lamont Dozier, Edward Holland, Jr., Richard "Popcorn" Wylie	3:21
23.	"For No Reason"	M. Smith, Ron Dunbar	2:38
24.	"We've Gotta Find a Way Back to Love"	Brian Holland, Lamont Dozier, Edward Holland, Jr.	3:08
