= Lost in Love (Freda Payne album) =

Compilation album by Freda Payne
- Released: March 21, 2000
- Genre: Pop, R&B
- Label: Universal Special Products

Freda Payne chronology
Live in Concert (1999)	Lost in Love (2000)	Band of Gold: The Best of Freda Payne (2000)

Lost in Love is a ten-track collection of songs that were recorded by Freda Payne during the decade of the seventies. With the exception of her biggest hit "Band of Gold," the rest of the tracks were recorded after she left the label of Invictus Records in 1973 (Invictus went defunct that same year). Tracks 2 through 9 were all taken from Payne's album Out of Payne Comes Love, while the final selection is from her album Payne & Pleasure, which was released a year before Out of Payne Comes Love. It was rated two stars by AllMusic.

== Track listing ==
No.	Title	Writer(s)	Length
1.	"Band of Gold"	Edythe Wayne, Ronald Dunbar	2:55
2.	"(See Me) One Last Time"	S. Parsons	4:59
3.	"Keep It Coming"	Nickolas Ashford, Valerie Simpson	3:17
4.	"You Brought the Woman out of Me"	Dennis Lambert, Brian Potter	3:25
5.	"Lost in Love"	D. Batteau, J. Klemmer	3:55
6.	"I Hear Rumors"	Bob Siller, Candy Siller	3:47
7.	"Seems So Long"	S. Wonder	3:55
8.	"Look What I Found"	P. Williams	3:50
9.	"You"	C. Bond	3:27
10.	"Run for Your Life"	M. Jackson, B. Perkins	3:27

- "Band of Gold" courtesy of Holland Group Productions, Inc., by arrangement with Celebrity Licensing, Inc.

== Album credits ==
- Compiled by: Bob Zipkin
- Project coordination: Jeff Fura and Lynise Levine
- Photo courtesy of: Showtime Archives (Toronto)
