= Stares and Whispers =

Stares and Whispers may refer to:

- Stares and Whispers (album), a 1977 album by Freda Payne
- "Stares and Whispers" (song), a 1977 song by Renée Geyer Band
