= Supernatural High =

Studio album by Freda Payne
- Released: 1978
- Genres: Disco, R&B
- Label: Capitol
- Producer: Skip Scarborough

Freda Payne chronology
Stares and Whispers (1977)	Supernatural High (1978)	Hot (1979)

Supernatural High is Freda Payne's eighth studio album and her second for Capitol Records. The first track is a medley of two songs devoted to the subject of happiness - a cover of the old 1929 song "Happy Days Are Here Again" and an original song entitled "Happy Music (Dance the Night Away)." The tracks "Pullin' Back" and "Livin' for the Beat" were co-written by Payne's then-husband, Gregory Abbott. "Storybook Romance" was written by Payne's younger sister, Scherrie. The first track and "I'll Do Anything for You" were two singles that were lifted from the album; they did not chart.

== Critical reception ==
Professional ratings
Review scores
Source	Rating
The Virgin Encyclopedia of R&B and Soul	2/5 stars

In 2013, Music Week wrote the album "is very much a product of its time, with Ms. Payne in fine voice throughout as she tackles sophisticated R&B fare and out-and-out disco with equal alacrity."

== Track listing ==
Side 1
No.	Title	Writer(s)	Length
1.	"Happy Days Are Here Again/Happy Music (Dance the Night Away)"	Jack Yellen, Milton Ager/Skip Scarborough, Sigidi	5:52
2.	"Pullin' Back"	Gregory Abbott, Scarborough	3:35
3.	"Tell Me Please"	Scarborough	3:40
4.	"Just the Thought of You (Supernatural High)"	Thom Bell, Leroy M. Bell	6:15

Side 2
No.	Title	Writer(s)	Length
1.	"Livin' for the Beat"	Abbott, Rich Cason	3:48
2.	"Falling in Love"	Deniece Williams, Tennyson Stephens	4:00
3.	"I'll Do Anything for You"	David N. Crawford, Jerome Evans	4:18
4.	"Storybook Romance"	Scherrie Payne	5:30

== Album credits ==
- Produced by: Skip Scarborough for Relmare Productions, Inc.
- Vocal Arrangements by: Skip Scarborough
- Rhythm Arranged by: Skip Scarborough, Skip Scarborough and Sigidi for "Happy Days Are Here Again/Happy Music (Dance the Night Away)," Sigidi for "Falling in Love," and David N. Crawford for "I'll Do Anything for You"
- Orchestra arranged and conducted by: David N. Crawford
- Recorded at Capitol Recording Studio by David Cole (Mixing Engineer)
- Mastered at A&M Records by Frank DeLuna

Musicians

- Guitar: John Rowin (courtesy of Row-Char Productions), Louis Russell (courtesy of Epic Records)
- Bass: Robert Russell (courtesy of Epic Records)
- Keyboards: Ernest Straughter (courtesy of Epic Records), Michael Stanton, Skip Scarborough
- Drums: Nate Neblett, Alphonse Mouzon (drums on "Pullin' Back," "Tell Me Please," and "Livin' for the Beat")
- Percussion: Munyungo Jackson
- Alto Saxophone Solo: Fred Jackson
- Concert Master: Jerry Vincent
- String Contractor: Jules Chaiken
- Horn Contractor: George Bohanon
- Background Vocals: Luther Waters (courtesy of Warner Bros. Records), Michael Wright (courtesy of Mercury Records), Dianne Wright (courtesy of Mercury Records), Scherrie Payne (courtesy of Motown Records)
- Production Assistant: Sigidi Abdallah
- Production Assistance: Greg Abbott
- Project Coordinator: Yvonne Brooks
- Art Direction: Roy Kohara
- Photography: Charles W. Bush
- Make-up: Bjorn
- Hair-stylist: Daley Henderson
- Wardrobe: Bruce Halperin
