= Unhooked Generation: The Complete Invictus Recordings =

Compilation album by Freda Payne
- Released: December 18, 2001
- Genre: Pop, R&B
- Label: Castle Music

Freda Payne chronology
Come See About Me (2001)	Unhooked Generation: The Complete Invictus Recordings (2001)	The Best of Freda Payne: Ten Best Series (2002)

Unhooked Generation: The Complete Invictus Recordings is a collection of every single recording that Freda Payne had made for Invictus Records, including single versions of her hits "You Brought the Joy" and "Deeper and Deeper" and an alternate version of her biggest hit "Band of Gold." Like its predecessor Band of Gold: The Best of Freda Payne, it was released by a British distributor and then released in the US as an import. Inside the album cover is an essay on Payne's life and career by Peter Doggett, along with a transcript from a phoned interview of Payne by David Nathan (done in October 2001).

== Track listing ==
Songs credited to "Edythe Wayne" and "Craighead" are in fact written by Brian Holland, Lamont Dozier and Eddie Holland (collectively known as Holland–Dozier–Holland), the owners of Invictus Records who were in a legal dispute with their former employer Motown Records at the time, hence the pseudonyms.

Disc One
No.	Title	Writer(s)	Length
1.	"Unhooked Generation"	Craighead, Ronald Dunbar	2:30
2.	"The Easiest Way to Fall"	Sheerie Lavette, Ronald Dunbar, Edythe Wayne	2:35
3.	"Band of Gold"	Edythe Wayne, Ronald Dunbar	2:55
4.	"I Left Some Dreams Back There"	Ronald Dunbar, Norma Toney	3:17
5.	"Deeper and Deeper"	Ronald Dunbar, Edythe Wayne, Norma Toney	3:01
6.	"Rock Me in the Cradle (Of Your Lovin' Arms)"	Greg Perry, General Johnson, Ronald Dunbar	3:04
7.	"Love on Borrowed Time"	William Weatherspoon, James Dean	2:58
8.	"Through the Memories of My Mind"	William Weatherspoon, Dean	2:39
9.	"This Girl Is a Woman Now"	A.J. Bernstein, Vic Millrose	2:58
10.	"The World Don't Owe You a Thing"	Dees, Knight	2:57
11.	"Now Is the Time to Say Goodbye"	Scherrie Payne	3:08
12.	"Happy Heart"	Jackie Rae, James Last	2:49
13.	"Cherish What Is Dear to You (While It's Near to You)"	Brian Holland, Lamont Dozier, Angelo Bond	3:55
14.	"I Shall Not Be Moved"	Brian Holland, Lamont Dozier	2:44
15.	"I'm Not Getting Any Better"	Brian Holland, Lamont Dozier	6:14
16.	"Suddenly It's Yesterday"	Brian Holland, Lamont Dozier	4:57
17.	"You Brought the Joy"	Brian Holland, Lamont Dozier	2:56
18.	"He's in My Life"	Ronald Dunbar, Edythe Wayne	3:47
19.	"You've Got to Love Somebody (Let It Be Me)"	William Weatherspoon, Raynard Miner	3:03

Disc Two
No.	Title	Writer(s)	Length
1.	"Instrumental Prelude"	Brian Holland, Lamont Dozier	0:55
2.	"The Road We Didn't Take"	Brian Holland, Lamont Dozier, D. Dumas	4:18
3.	"Bring the Boys Home"	Greg Perry, Angelo Bond, General Johnson	3:30
4.	"Odds and Ends"	General Johnson, Greg Perry	3:45
5.	"Mama's Gone"	General Johnson, Greg Perry	3:26
6.	"How Can I Live Without My Love"	Brian Holland, Lamont Dozier	2:56
7.	"Just a Woman"	William Weatherspoon, Raynard Miner, Dean	2:34
8.	"Come Back"	Brian Holland, Lamont Dozier	2:51
9.	"You're the Only Bargain I've Got"	Edythe Wayne, Ronald Dunbar, General Johnson	3:42
10.	"We've Gotta Find a Way Back to Love"	Brian Holland, Lamont Dozier, Edward Holland, Jr.	3:06
11.	"Two Wrongs Don't Make a Right"	Brian Holland, Lamont Dozier, Edward Holland, Jr., Richard "Popcorn" Wylie	3:21
12.	"Rainy Days and Mondays"	Roger Nichols, Paul Williams	4:42
13.	"If You Go Away"	Rod McKuen, Jacques Brel	6:33
14.	"Right Back Where We Started From"	Smith, Ronald Dunbar	3:49
15.	"Mood for Love"	Greg Perry, Angelo Bond, General Johnson	3:07
16.	"Reaching Out"	Smith, Ronald Dunbar	3:19
17.	"For No Reason"	Smith, Ronald Dunbar	2:37
18.	"The Man of My Dreams"	Smith, Ronald Dunbar	4:14
19.	"Mother Misery's Favourite Child"	Brian Holland, Lamont Dozier, Edward Holland, Jr.	5:08
20.	"You Brought the Joy (US Single Version)"	Brian Holland, Lamont Dozier	2:56
21.	"Band of Gold (Alternative Version)"	Edythe Wayne, Ronald Dunbar	3:41
22.	"Deeper and Deeper (Single Version)"	Ronald Dunbar, Edythe Wayne, Norma Toney	3:18

== Album credits ==
- Compiled and coordinated by: John Reed
- Remastered by: Nick Watson at SRT, St. Ives, Cambs
- Design and artwork by: Paul Bevoir for Love Melody
- Thanks to David Nathan and Freda Payne
