= I'll Prove It to You =

Studio album by Gregory Abbott
- Released: 1988
- Label: Columbia
- Producer: Gregory Abbott

Gregory Abbott chronology
Shake You Down (1986)	I'll Prove It to You (1988)	One World! (1996)

I'll Prove It to You is the second album by the American musician Gregory Abbott. It was released in 1988.

The album peaked at No. 132 on the Billboard 200. The title track peaked in the top 10 on the Hot Black Singles chart.

== Production ==
The album was produced by Abbott; he also played drums. The title track is performed as a ballad; "Prisoner of Love" was done in a funk style.

== Critical reception ==
Professional ratings
Review scores
Source	Rating
AllMusic	3/5 stars
The Encyclopedia of Popular Music	3/5 stars
Los Angeles Times	2/4 stars
The Philadelphia Inquirer	2/4 stars

The Los Angeles Times called "Crazy Over You" "a slow-drag '50s-sounding ballad that Jackie Wilson would've had a ball recording." The Washington Post opined that "Abbott's at his best with slow, swaying ballads like 'Unfinished Business', but the overall effect is ignorable." USA Today deemed Abbott "a minor talent marketed like a superstar, and his everyman voice does little more than highlight his mediocre original material."

The Christian Science Monitor stated that Abbott "throws in a couple of '50s-style rhythm-and-blues numbers, where he lets loose his Smokey Robinson falsetto." The Philadelphia Inquirer determined that Abbott's "material is weak and repetitive, but his singing is still strong and confident."

AllMusic wrote that the album "finds the vocalist in the same vein as his previous effort; merging '80s music technology with '50s doowop/early-'60s soul-tinged sensibility."

== Track listing ==
No.	Title	Length
1.	"Back to Stay"	3:55
2.	"Prisoner of Love"	4:40
3.	"I'll Prove It to You"	4:09
4.	"Runaway"	3:21
5.	"Unfinished Business"	3:47
6.	"Crazy Over You"	4:27
7.	"Let Me Be Your Hero"	4:00
8.	"Take Me Back"	3:59
9.	"Two of a Kind"	2:55
10.	"She's an Entertainer"	3:25
