= Freda Payne =

American singer and actress (born 1942)

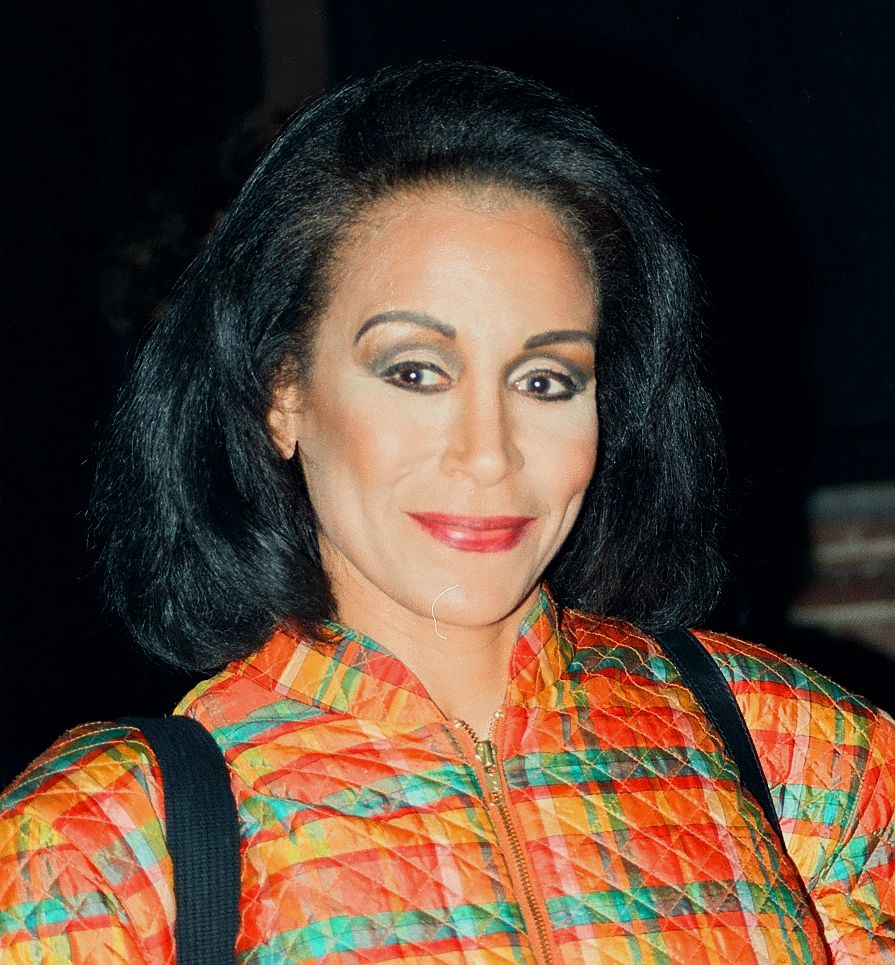
- Payne in 1997
- Born: Freda Charcilia Payne; September 19, 1942 (age 83); Detroit, Michigan, U.S.
- Occupations: Singer; actress
- Years active: 1961–present
- Spouse: Gregory Abbott (m. 1976; div. 1979)
- Partner(s): Edmund Sylvers (1979–1983)
- Children: 1
- Relatives: Scherrie Payne (sister)
- Musical career
- Genres: R&B; soul; disco; jazz
- Instruments: Vocals
- Labels: Artistry; Impulse; Invictus; MGM; ABC; Capitol; Volt

Freda Charcilia Payne (born September 19, 1942 (Note: Some sources give a birth year of 1945, but this appears to be an error as all sources agree that she is older than her sister Scherrie, born 1944.)) is an American singer and actress. Payne is best known for her career in music during the mid-1960s through the mid-1980s. Her most popular record is her 1970 hit single "Band of Gold". Payne was also an actress in musicals and film as well as the host of a TV talk show. Payne is the older sister of Scherrie Payne, a former singer with the American vocal group the Supremes. She also acted on Living Single.

== Biography ==
=== Early life and career ===
Payne was born in Detroit, Michigan, and grew up listening to jazz singers, such as Ella Fitzgerald and Billie Holiday. As a teenager, she attended the Detroit Institute of Musical Arts; she soon began singing radio commercial jingles and took part in (and won many) local TV and radio talent shows. In 1963, she moved to New York City and worked with many entertainers, including Quincy Jones, Pearl Bailey, and Bill Cosby. The next year, her debut album, a jazz recording with arranger Manny Albam titled After the Lights Go Down Low and Much More!!! was released on the Impulse! label. (This album was re-issued on CD in Japan in early 2002 and again in the United States in 2005.) In 1965 she toured Europe for the first time, recording an album, Freda Payne in Stockholm, in Sweden with Don Gardner and Bengt-Arne Wallin. In 1966, she released her second American album, again in the jazz idiom, How Do You Say I Don't Love You Anymore, for MGM Records. She also made occasional guest appearances on television shows including The Merv Griffin Show and The Tonight Show Starring Johnny Carson.

She added theatrical credits to her repertoire: she understudied Leslie Uggams for the Broadway show Hallelujah Baby in 1967, and appeared with the Equity Theatre in a production of Lost in the Stars. In 1969, her old friends back home in Detroit, Brian Holland, Lamont Dozier, and Eddie Holland, persuaded her to sign with their newly formed record label Invictus. During that same year, her first Invictus single, "Unhooked Generation" (a minor R&B hit), was released. Shortly thereafter, Eddie Holland offered her a song titled "Band of Gold", which he wrote along with Brian Holland, Lamont Dozier, and Ronald Dunbar. In early 1970, the song became an instant pop smash reaching No. 3 in the US and No. 1 in the UK for six consecutive weeks; it also gave Payne her first gold record. Global sales were estimated at two million. An album of the same name proved to be fairly successful as well. Other Invictus singles included "Deeper and Deeper", which reached No. 24 in the US and No. 33 in the UK at the end of 1970; "You Brought the Joy", and the Vietnam War protest song "Bring the Boys Home" (U.S. Billboard Hot 100 No. 12, 1971), her second gold record. Her other Invictus albums were Contact (1971), The Best of Freda Payne (1972, a compilation which included four new, unissued songs), and her last Invictus album Reaching Out (1973).

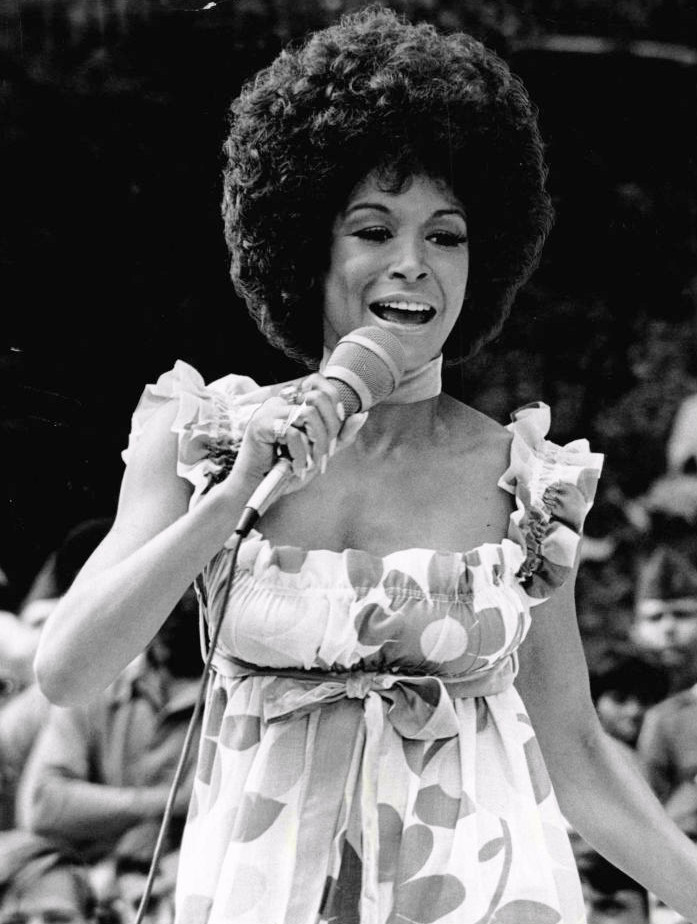
Payne performing at the Walter Reed Army Medical Center for a taping of The Ed Sullivan Show, 1970

In 1973, she left Invictus and recorded albums for ABC/Dunhill and Capitol, but she never found the commercial success that she had enjoyed with Invictus. She recorded a duet "I Wanna See You Soon" with Capitol stablemates Tavares. She released three disco albums for Capitol from 1977 to 1979, Stares and Whispers, Supernatural High and Hot. The first one features the disco hit "Love Magnet" produced by Frank Wilson (1977).

In 1981, she briefly hosted her own talk show Today's Black Woman, and also found work acting in different movies, Broadway and other theatre productions throughout the 1980s. Although she was concentrating more on acting by that time, she never gave up music; in 1982, she recorded a single entitled "In Motion" for the Sutra label in New York, and in 1986, she recorded a remake of her old hit "Band of Gold" with Belinda Carlisle. In 1990, she recorded three songs for Ian Levine's UK Motorcity label: another remake of "Band of Gold", "Memories and Souvenirs", and "Only Minutes Away". In the mid-1990s, she released three albums for Dove Music: The (Unauthorized) I Hate Barney Songbook: A Parody (1994), An Evening with Freda Payne: Live in Concert which featured her sister Scherrie Payne on background vocals, and her first (and only) Christmas album Christmas with Freda and Friends, which featured a duet between Freda and Scherrie (both 1996). She also continued her acting career appearing in the films, Private Obsession (1995), Ragdoll (1999) as the character Gran, Nutty Professor II: The Klumps (2000), and Fire & Ice (made-for-TV, 2001).

=== Later career ===
In early 2001, Payne released a new album entitled Come See About Me for the Volt Records label (the title track is a remake of the Supremes' hit). In early 2003, she performed in a show called Love & Payne, with Darlene Love at Feinstein's at the Regency in New York, and at the Cinegrill in the Hollywood Roosevelt Hotel in Los Angeles, getting excellent reviews.

During the early 2000s, the following compilation albums of her music were released: Lost in Love (which includes nine of her post-Invictus recordings), Band of Gold: The Best of Freda Payne (both 2000), Unhooked Generation: The Complete Invictus Recordings (2001), and The Best of Freda Payne: Ten Best Series (2002). In late 2002, Payne appeared with many R&B stars on the "Rhythm, Love, and Soul" edition of the PBS series American Soundtrack. Her performance of "Band of Gold" was included on the accompanying live album that was released in 2004. On April 22, 2009, Payne appeared on American Idol and sang "Band of Gold".

In February 2010, Payne joined Kanye West, Jordin Sparks, Jennifer Hudson, Barbra Streisand and many more on We Are the World for Haiti Relief. In 2011, Payne recorded a duet, "Saving A Life", with British pop star Sir Cliff Richard for inclusion on his Soulicious album. She joined Richard on his "Soulicious" tour of the UK in October of the same year. She sang the new duet with Richard along with her own hit "Band of Gold".

In January 2018, she performed "A Tribute to Ella Fitzgerald", in the Sitnik Theatre of the Lackland Performing Arts Center, in Hackettstown, New Jersey.

== Personal life and honors ==
Payne was married to American singer Gregory Abbott from 1976 until 1979. Their wedding took place in Chicago. They spent their honeymoon in Acapulco, Mexico. Payne and Abbott had a son, Gregory Abbott Jr., who was born on September 19, 1977, Payne's 35th birthday. Payne later had a relationship with American musician Edmund Sylvers (lead singer of the Sylvers) from 1979 until January 1983. Sylvers wrote and produced her 1982 single "In Motion".

In 1974, she made the cover of Jet after she was appointed a Dame of Justice of the Order of St John of Jerusalem by the Prince of Rumania.

In 2017, Payne was inducted into the 2017 class of the Rhythm and Blues Music Hall of Fame, in her hometown of Detroit.

In 2023, the Women Songwriters Hall of Fame awarded Payne a Lifetime Achievement and Legacy Award.

== Discography ==
=== Studio albums ===
| Year | Album | Chart positions | |
| Year | Album | US 200 | US R&B |
|---|---|---|---|
| 1964 | After the Lights Go Down Low and Much More!!! | — | — |
| 1966 | How Do You Say I Don't Love You Anymore | — | — |
| 1970 | Band of Gold | 60 | 17 |
| 1971 | Contact | 76 | 12 |
| 1973 | Reaching Out | — | — |
| 1974 | Payne & Pleasure | — | 55 |
| 1975 | Out of Payne Comes Love | — | — |
| 1977 | Stares and Whispers | — | — |
| 1978 | Supernatural High | — | — |
| 1979 | Hot | — | — |
| 1994 | The (Unauthorized) I Hate Barney Songbook: A Parody | — | — |
| 1996 | Christmas with Freda and Friends | — | — |
| 2001 | Come See About Me | — | — |
| 2007 | On the Inside | — | — |
| 2014 | Come Back to Me Love | — | — |
| 2021 | Let There Be Love | — | — |
"—" denotes the album failed to chart

=== Live albums ===
- 1965: Freda Payne in Stockholm' with Don Gardner Quintet with Dee Dee Ford and Jimmy Ricks (Swedish release 1965, USA release 1971)
- 1996: An Evening with Freda Payne: Live in Concert
- 1999: Live in Concert

=== Compilations albums ===
| Year | Album | Chart positions | |
| Year | Album | US 200 | US R&B |
|---|---|---|---|
| 1972 | The Best of Freda Payne | 152 | 44 |
| 1991 | Greatest Hits | — | — |
| 2000 | Lost in Love | — | — |
| 2000 | Band of Gold: The Best of Freda Payne | — | — |
| 2001 | Unhooked Generation: The Complete Invictus Recordings | — | — |
| 2002 | The Best of Freda Payne: Ten Best Series | — | — |
"—" denotes the album failed to chart

=== Singles ===
==== As a lead artist ====
List of singles as a lead artist, with selected chart positions, sales figures and certifications
| Title | Year | Chart positions | | | | Sales | Certifications | Album |
| Title | Year | US | US R&B | AUS | UK | Sales | Certifications | Album |
|---|---|---|---|---|---|---|---|---|
| "(Desafinado) Slightly Out of Tune" | 1962 | — | — | — | — | | | Non-album single |
| "Pretty Baby" | 1963 | — | — | — | — | | | Non-album single |
| "It's Time" | 1963 | — | — | — | — | | | After the Lights Go Down Low and Much More!!! |
| "You've Lost That Lovin' Feelin'" | 1966 | — | — | — | — | | | How Do You Say I Don't Love You Anymore |
| "The Unhooked Generation" | 1969 | — | 43 | — | — | | | Band of Gold |
| "Band of Gold" | 1970 | 3 | 20 | 5 | 1 | World: 2,000,000; US: 1,000,000; UK: 450,000 (Note: Combined 1970 physical sales of 250,000 and sales tracked since 28 October 2006 of 200,000.) | RIAA: Gold; BPI: Silver | Band of Gold |
| "Deeper and Deeper" | 1970 | 24 | 9 | 64 | 33 | | | Band of Gold |
| "Cherish What Is Dear to You (While It's Near To You)" | 1971 | 44 | 11 | — | 46 | | | Contact |
| "Bring the Boys Home" | 1971 | 12 | 3 | — | — | US: 1,008,000 | RIAA: Gold | Contact |
| "You Brought the Joy" | 1971 | 52 | 21 | — | — | | | Contact |
| "The Road We Didn't Take" | 1972 | 100 | — | — | — | | | Contact |
| "Through the Memory of My Mind" | 1972 | — | — | — | — | | | The Best of Freda Payne |
| "Two Wrongs Don't Make a Right" | 1973 | — | 75 | — | — | | | Reaching Out |
| "For No Reason" | 1973 | — | — | — | — | | | Reaching Out |
| "It's Yours to Have" | 1974 | — | 81 | — | — | | | Payne & Pleasure |
| "I Get Carried Away" | 1975 | — | — | — | — | | | Payne & Pleasure |
| "You" | 1975 | — | — | — | — | | | Out of Payne Comes Love |
| "I Get High (On Your Memory)" | 1976 | — | — | — | — | | | Stares And Whispers |
| "Bring Back the Joy" | 1977 | — | — | — | — | | | Stares And Whispers |
| "Love Magnet" | 1977 | — | 85 | — | — | | | Stares And Whispers |
| "Feed Me Your Love" | 1978 | — | — | — | — | | | Stares And Whispers |
| "Happy Days Are Here Again/ Happy Music (Dance the Night Away)" | 1978 | — | — | — | — | | | Supernatural High |
| "I'll Do Anything for You" | 1979 | — | — | — | — | | | Supernatural High |
| "Red Hot" | 1979 | — | — | — | — | | | Hot |
| "Can't Wait" | 1979 | — | — | — | — | | | Hot |
| "In Motion" | 1982 | — | 63 | — | — | | | Non-album single |
"—" denotes the single failed to chart or was not released

==== As a featured artist ====
List of singles as a featured artist, with selected chart positions
| Title | Year | Chart positions | | Album |
| Title | Year | US Dance | CAN | Album |
|---|---|---|---|---|
| "I Wanna See You Soon" (Tavares featuring Freda Payne) | 1977 | — | — | The Best Of Tavares |
| "L.A. Street Scene (It's A Jubilee)" (Donny Osmond featuring Phillip Ingram, Scherrie Payne and Freda Payne) | 1985 | — | — | Non-album single |
| "Band of Gold" (Belinda Carlisle featuring Freda Payne) | 1986 | 26 | 91 | Belinda |

== Filmography ==
=== Concerts ===
- 2006: Flashbacks: Soul Sensation – Compilation
- 2009: Freda Payne: High Standards with Stanley Turrentine and Jerome Richardson
- 2009: Live in Concert with The Stylistics

=== As an actress ===
- 1973: Book of Numbers
- 1993: Living Single
- 1997: Sprung
- 1999: Ragdoll
- 2000: Nutty Professor II: The Klumps
- 2001: Deadly Rhapsody
- 2007: Cordially Invited
- 2014: Ella: First Lady of Song
- 2014: The Divorce
- 2017: Kinky
- 2021: Family Reunion (Ursula) S4.E5 Remember My Funny Valentine? Netflix TV Show

== See also ==
- List of soul musicians
- List of disco artists (F–K)
- List of people from Detroit
- List of acts who appeared on American Bandstand
- List of people who appeared on Soul Train
- List of performers on Top of the Pops

== Notes ==
Biography

Discography
