= Greatest Hits (Freda Payne album) =

Compilation album by Freda Payne
- Released: July 1, 1991
- Genre: Pop, R&B
- Length: 43:17
- Label: HDH Records

Freda Payne chronology
Hot (1979)	Greatest Hits (1991)	Freda Payne Sings the (Unauthorized) I Hate Barney Songbook: A Parody (1995)

Greatest Hits is a collection of songs recorded by Freda Payne for the label of Invictus Records. Like many collections of Payne's music, it begins with her biggest hit "Band of Gold." It contains all eight singles from that label, along with four album tracks. It mistakenly says that the ninth track is "I'm Not Getting Any Better," as it is actually two songs put together: "I'm Not Getting Any Better" and "Suddenly It's Yesterday." Both of these songs were written by Brian Holland and Lamont Dozier. Inside the album cover are liner notes from Eddie Holland along with a brief history of Freda Payne's life and career that mainly focuses on her career with Invictus Records. It was rated 4.5 stars by AllMusic.

== Track listing ==
No.	Title	Writer(s)	Length
1.	"Band of Gold"	Edythe Wayne, Ron Dunbar	2:54
2.	"The Unhooked Generation"	Edythe Wayne, Ron Dunbar	2:29
3.	"Deeper and Deeper"	Edythe Wayne, Ron Dunbar	3:03
4.	"Two Wrongs Don't Make a Right"	Brian Holland, Lamont Dozier, Edward Holland Jr., Richard "Popcorn" Wylie	3:16
5.	"You Brought the Joy"	Brian Holland, Lamont Dozier	2:56
6.	"Through the Memory of My Mind"	William Weatherspoon	2:40
7.	"Bring the Boys Home"	General Johnson, Angelo Bond, Greg Perry	3:29
8.	"Cherish What Is Dear to You"	Brian Holland, Lamont Dozier, Angelo Bond	3:56
9.	"I'm Not Getting Any Better"	Brian Holland, Lamont Dozier	11:15
10.	"The Road We Didn't Take"	Brian Holland, Lamont Dozier, B. Dumas	4:17
11.	"I Shall Not Be Moved"	Brian Holland, Lamont Dozier	2:44

== Album credits ==
- Project producer: Richard J. Davis
- Executive producer: Eddie Holland
- Compiled by: Rodney J. Brown
- Digital transfers: L.T. Horn for Supertec
- Preproduction: Rodney J. Brown
- Project coordinator: Victoria J. Canchola
- Digital mastering: Joe Tarantino (Fantasy Studios, Berkeley, CA)
