= Out of Payne Comes Love =

Studio album by Freda Payne
- Released: 1975
- Studio: ABC, Los Angeles, California
- Genre: Pop, R&B
- Label: ABC
- Producer: Bob Monaco

Freda Payne chronology
Payne & Pleasure (1974)	Out of Payne Comes Love (1975)	Stares and Whispers (1977)

Out of Payne Comes Love is an American released album by Freda Payne's, released in 1975. All of the tracks except for "Million Dollar Horse" would be later issued on the collection Lost in Love.

== Track listing ==
Side A
No.	Title	Writer(s)	Length
1.	"Look What I Found"	Paul Williams	3:50
2.	"I Hear Rumors"	Bob Siller, Candy Siller	3:47
3.	"You"	Christopher Bond	3:42
4.	"Keep It Coming"	Nickolas Ashford, Valerie Simpson	3:17
5.	"Seems So Long"	Stevie Wonder	3:55

Side B
No.	Title	Writer(s)	Length
1.	"You Brought the Woman out of Me"	Dennis Lambert, Brian Potter	3:25
2.	"(See Me) One Last Time"	Samuel Parsons	4:59
3.	"Lost in Love"	David Batteau, John Klemmer	3:55
4.	"Million Dollar Horse"	James Seals, Walter Heath	5:32

== Personnel ==
- Produced by: Bob Monaco
- Recorded and mixed at: ABC Recording Studios, Inc.
- Engineered by: Howard Gale
- Mastered at: ABC Recording Studios, Inc.
- Mastering engineer: Phil Cross
- Special thanks to: Howard Gale, Ron Stockert, Gary Monaco, Jimmy Benso, John Klemmer and Cyrano, Los Angeles for cover location
- Wardrobe courtesy of: Holly's Harp, Los Angeles
- Album design by: Earl R. Klasky
- Photography by: Antonin Kratochvil

=== Musicians ===
- "Look What I Found"
  - Ron Stockert: Strings and horns arrangements
  - Dennis Belfield: Bass
  - Mickey McMeel: Drums
  - Ron Stockert: Fender rhodes, piano
  - Ben Benay: Electric guitar
  - Jimmy Benso: Electric guitar solo
  - Gavin Christopher: Percussion
  - Brooks Hunnicutt, Tish Coulter, Lisa Freeman Roberts: Background vocals
- "I Hear Rumors"
  - Jimmie Haskell: Strings arrangements
  - Scott Edwards: Bass
  - Ollie Brown: Drums
  - Ben Benay: Acoustic and electric guitar
  - Ron Stockert: Fender rhodes, piano
  - Jimmy Benso: Electric guitar
  - Gavin Christopher: Percussion
  - Tish Coulter, Lisa Freeman Roberts, Maxine Willard: Background vocals
- "You"
  - Jimmie Haskell: Strings arrangements
  - Dennis Belfield: Bass
  - Mickey McMeel: Drums
  - Ben Benay: Guitar solo
  - Jimmy Benso: Rhythm guitar
  - Ron Stockert: Piano, moog, organ
  - Gary Monaco: Percussion
  - Lisa Freeman Roberts, Tish Coulter, Maxine Willard, Jay Gruska: Background vocals
- "Keep It Coming"
  - Ron Stockert: Horns arrangements, clavinet, piano, fender rhodes, organ
  - Dennis Belfield: Bass
  - Mickey McMeel: Drums
  - Ben Benay: Electric guitar
  - Brooks Hunnicutt, Tish Coulter, Lisa Freeman Roberts: Background vocals
- "Seems So Long"
  - Johnny Bond: String bass
  - Ollie Brown: Drums
  - Ben Benay: Electric guitar, acoustic guitar
  - Ron Stockert: Organ, string ensemble, fender rhodes
  - Victor Feldman: Vibes
  - Gavin Christopher: Percussion
- "You Brought the Woman out of Me"
  - Ron Stockert: Strings arrangements
  - Scott Edwards: Bass
  - Ollie Brown: Drums
  - Ron Stockert: Arp odyssey, clavinet, moog, organ
  - Ben Benay: Electric rhythm guitar
  - Jimmy Benso: Guitar solo, percussion
  - Gavin Christopher: Percussion
  - Tish Coulter, Brooks Hunnicutt, Lisa Freeman Roberts: Background vocals
- "(See Me) One Last Time"
  - Jimmie Haskell: Strings arrangements
  - Dennis Belfield: Bass
  - Mickey McMeel: Drums
  - Ben Benay: Acoustic guitar
  - Ron Stockert: Piano
- "Lost in Love"
  - Dennis Belfield: Bass
  - Mickey McMeel: Drums
  - Ben Benay: Electric and acoustic guitar
  - Ron Stockert: Fender rhodes
  - John Klemmer: Saxophone solo
  - Victor Feldman: Vibes, flapamba
  - Gavin Christopher and Jimmy Benso: Percussion
- "Million Dollar Horse"
  - Ben Benay: Horns arrangements, electric guitar
  - Jimmie Haskell: Strings arrangements
  - Scott Edwards: Bass
  - Ollie Brown: Drums
  - Ron Stockert: Fender rhodes, organ, piano, clavinet
  - Jimmy Benso: Electric guitar effects
  - Gary Monaco: Percussion
  - Gavin Christopher: Congas
  - Tish Coulter, Maxine Willard, Lisa Freeman Roberts, Jay Gruska: Background vocals
  - The Kids: Kim, Scott, Renée
