= Shake You Down (album) =

Studio album by Gregory Abbott
- Released: February 1, 1986
- Recorded: 1984–1986
- Studios: Atlantic Studios, Unique Recording Studios and Grabbitt Studios (New York City, New York); Sonic Sound (Freepoint, New York)
- Genres: R&B; soul; quiet storm
- Length: 31:35
- Label: Columbia
- Producer: Gregory Abbott

Gregory Abbott chronology
Shake You Down (1986)	I'll Prove It to You (1988)

Singles from Shake You Down
- 1. "Shake You Down" / "Wait Until Tomorrow" Released: August 1986; 2. "I Got the Feelin' (It's Over)" / "Rhyme and Reason" Released: 1986; 3. "You're My Angel" (remix) / "I'll Find a Way" Released: 1987 (Europe)

Professional ratings
Review scores
Source	Rating
Allmusic	4/5 stars
Christgau's Record Guide	B+

Shake You Down is the debut album by American R&B singer-songwriter Gregory Abbott. It was self-written and produced by Abbott, being released by Columbia Records in 1986.

In the US, two singles were released from the record (Europe saw a third single-release with "You're My Angel"); the title track was a massive hit single, reaching the top spot on the Billboard Hot 100 in 1986. The other, "I Got The Feelin' (It's Over)" was an R&B hit as well, reaching number 5 on that chart. On the strength of the singles, the album went platinum; it reached that certification on February 2, 1987.

== Reception ==
The Village Voice critic Robert Christgau said that Abbott tries to be "a great love man without a great voice", but "by reinventing a black pop of modest means, he takes a first step toward returning that great crossover in the sky to the people."

AllMusic's Craig Lytle retrospectively gave the recording 4 of 5 stars, saying it "has an even flow. All the tracks have that mid-tempo rhythm. The quality vocals, light production touches, and effervescent melodies are attractive attributes."

== Track listing ==
All songs written and produced by Gregory Abbott. (copyright CBS Songs/Control)

Side one
No.	Title	Length
1.	"I Got the Feelin' (It's Over)"	4:05
2.	"Say You Will"	4:00
3.	"Shake You Down"	4:03
4.	"You're My Angel"	3:55

Side two
No.	Title	Length
5.	"Magic"	3:58
6.	"Wait Until Tomorrow"	3:51
7.	"Rhyme and Reason"	3:36
8.	"I'll Find a Way"	4:07

== Personnel ==
- Gregory Abbott – lead vocals, backing vocals, keyboards, drums (1, 4, 6–8), percussion, arrangements
- Alan Palanker – keyboards, co-arrangements (2–5, 7, 8)
- Marlon Graves – guitars
- T.M. Stevens – bass
- David Beal – drums (2, 3, 5)
- John Licitra – flute, saxophones
- Aida Foreman – backing vocals
- Robert Deadmon – backing vocals (3)

=== Production ===
- Charles Koppelman – executive producer
- Gregory Abbott – producer
- Gerry Comito – engineer, recording
- Mark Larson – design
- Raul Vega – photography

== Certifications ==
Certifications for Shake You Down
Region	Certification	Certified units/sales
Canada (Music Canada)	Gold	50,000^{^}
United States (RIAA)	Gold	500,000^{^}
^{^} Shipments figures based on certification alone.
