= Stares and Whispers (album) =

Studio album by Freda Payne
- Released: 1977
- Genres: Pop, R&B
- Length: 31:10
- Label: Capitol
- Producers: Frank Wilson, Tony Camillo

Freda Payne chronology
Out of Payne Comes Love (1975)	Stares and Whispers (1977)	Supernatural High (1978)

Stares and Whispers is Freda Payne's seventh studio album released in 1977; it was also her first for Capitol Records. The last two tracks, "Loving You Means So Much to Me" and "Bring Back the Joy," were co-written by Payne's then-husband, Gregory Abbott, the latter of which was co-written by Payne herself. Four tracks were lifted from the album, "I Get High (On Your Memory)," "Bring Back the Joy," "Love Magnet," and "Feed Me Your Love." "Love Magnet" was the only one of the four that charted.

The album was re-released by a British label called Soulmusic.Com on July 26, 2011. The reissue contains three bonus tracks ("I Can't Live on a Memory," "Baby You've Got What It Takes," and "I Wanna See You Soon", a duet with the Tavares from their album Love Storm) and an essay about Payne's life and career during the recording and release of the album, which was written by David Nathan, founder of Soulmusic.com.

== Reception ==
Professional ratings
Review scores
Source	Rating
AllMusic	2/5 stars

Ed Hogan of AllMusic gave the album 2 out of 5 stars stating "One of the LP's singles, "Bring Back the Joy" is melodic, has two tempos, and conga breaks. Other standouts are the loping, spacy mid-tempo single " I Get High (On Your Memory)" and the coy "Loving You Means So Much to Me," co-written by Gregory Abbott of "Shake You Down" fame."

== Track listing ==
Side 1
No.	Title	Writer(s)	Length
1.	"Master of Love"	A. Posey, Josef Powell	7:56
2.	"Love Magnet"	Wieder, John Footman, Nancy Wilson	6:23
3.	"Stares and Whispers"	John Footman, Dennis McFadden, Nancy Wilson	3:24

Side 2
No.	Title	Writer(s)	Length
1.	"Feed Me Your Love"	A. Posey, Josef Powell	3:35
2.	"I Get High (On Your Memory)"	Marilyn McLeod, Pam Sawyer	3:07
3.	"Loving You Means So Much to Me"	Gregory Abbott, R. Carson	3:21
4.	"Bring Back the Joy"	Gregory Abbott, Freda Payne	3:50

CD bonus tracks

- "I Can't Live on a Memory" - (Tony Camillo, Gregory Abbott) - 3:22
- "Baby You've Got What It Takes" - (Tony Camillo, Gregory Abbott) - 2:56
- "I Wanna See You Soon" (duet with Tavares) - (Keni St. Lewis, F. Perren) - 3:49

== Personnel ==
- Produced by: Frank E. Wilson for Spec-o-Lite Productions and Tony Camillo for Camillo-Marcucci Productions
- Executive Producer: Larkin Arnold
- Recorded at Crystal Sound Recording Studio
- Recording Engineer: Kevin Beamish
- Mastering Engineer: Jeff Sanders
- Mixing Engineer: Kevin Beamish, Frank Wilson, David Henson

Musicians

- Percussion: Jack Ashford, Bobbye Hall, Frederick Lewis
- Synthesizer: Michael Boddicker
- Keyboards: Reginald Burke, John Footman, Bruce Miller, Gregory Phillinganes, Josef Powell
- Guitar: Clarence Drayton, Charles Fearing, Gregg Poree
- Drums: Raymond Pounds
- Bass: Nathan Watts (courtesy of Blackbull Productions)

Horns

- Trumpets: Oscar Brashear, Chuck Findley, Steve Madio
- Trombones: George Bohanon, George Thatcher
- Saxophone: William Green, Ernest Watts, Terry Harrington (courtesy of Karma/A&M Records)
- Strings and Horns: David Vandepitt on "Master of Love," "Love Magnet"; Bruce Miller on "Stares and Whispers," "Feed Me Your Love," "Loving You Means So Much to Me"
- Background Vocals: Carolyn Dennis, Angela Winbush, Shirley Brewer, Gwen Matthews (courtesy of Blackbull Productions)
- Legal Advisor: Raphael Tisdale
- Special Thanks to the Crystal Kids
- Art Direction: Roy Kohara
- Photography: Charles Bush
- Wardrobe by: Lady Madonna
- Make-up and Hair Design: Björn
