= After the Lights Go Down Low and Much More!!! =

Studio album by Freda Payne
- Released: 1964
- Recorded: September 17–19, 1963
- Genre: Jazz
- Label: Impulse!
- Producer: Bob Thiele

Freda Payne chronology
After the Lights Go Down Low and Much More!!! (1964)	How Do You Say I Don't Love You Anymore (1966)

Professional ratings
Review scores
Source	Rating
Allmusic	4/5 stars

After the Lights Go Down Low and Much More!!! is the debut album of Freda Payne, released in 1964. Duke Ellington's "Blue Piano" makes its first album appearance, while the majority of the songs on this album are cover songs and jazz standards. The six songs on the first side of the album were recorded on September 17 and 18 of 1963, while the second side was recorded on September 19 of that year (Payne's twenty-first birthday). This album was reissued on CD in Japan in January 2002 and then on September 13, 2005 in the United States.

== Track listing ==
Side 1
No.	Title	Writer(s)	Length
1.	"After the Lights Go Down Low"	Phil Belmonte, Leroy C. Lovett, Allen White	3:23
2.	"Sweet Pumpkin"	Ronnell Bright	2:56
3.	"Blue Piano"	Duke Ellington, Bill Katz, Ruth Ann Roberts, Bob Thiele	2:48
4.	"The Things We Love to Do"	Clayton, Clara Ward	2:32
5.	"Awaken My Lonely One"	Moody, Sherrell	2:07
6.	"Sweet September"	Bill McGuffie, Phillips, Stanley	2:33

Side 2
No.	Title	Writer(s)	Length
1.	"I Cried for You"	Gus Arnheim, Arthur Freed, Abe Lyman	3:58
2.	"'Round Midnight"	Thelonious Monk, Cootie Williams, Bernie Hanighen	4:20
3.	"Out of This World"	Harold Arlen, Johnny Mercer	3:10
4.	"Lonely Woman"	Ornette Coleman, Margo Guryan	3:53
5.	"I Wish I Knew"	Harry Warren, Mack Gordon	3:50
6.	"It's Time"	Ruth Roberts, Pauline Rivelli	1:53

== Personnel ==
- Freda Payne – vocals
- Manny Albam – arranger and conductor

=== Additional musicians ===
Side 1

- Trumpets – Nick Travis, Ernie Royal, Al De Risi, Jimmy Nottingham
- Trombones – Alan Raph, Quentin Jackson, Bob Brookmeyer
- Alto saxophone – Phil Woods
- Tenor saxophones – Zoot Sims, Seldon Powell
- Baritone saxophone – Sol Schlinger
- Piano – Hank Jones
- Bass – Art Davis
- Drums – Gus Johnson

Side 2

- Alto saxophone – Phil Woods
- Drums – Walter Perkins
- Piano – Hank Jones
- Bass – Art Davis
- Guitar – Jim Hall

=== Technical personnel ===
- Producer – Bob Thiele
- Engineer – Bob Simpson
- Cover and liner photos – Joe Alper
- Liner design – Joe Lebow
