= The Best of Freda Payne =

Greatest hits album by Freda Payne
- Released: 1972
- Genre: Pop, R&B
- Label: Invictus
- Producer: Greg Perry, General Johnson, William Weatherspoon, Raynard Miner

Freda Payne chronology
| Contact (1971) | The Best of Freda Payne (1972) | Reaching Out (1973) |

Professional ratings
Review scores
| Source | Rating |
|---|---|
| Christgau's Record Guide | B |

The Best of Freda Payne is a 12-track collection of songs recorded by Freda Payne. Although it is a collection of previously recorded tracks, it also includes four unissued songs as well: "How Can I Live Without My Life," "Just a Woman," "You're the Only Bargain I've Got," and "Come Back" (none of which were released as singles). Six of the songs on this collection were previously issued as singles for the Invictus label.

== Track listing ==
Side 1
| No. | Title | Writer(s) | Length |
|---|---|---|---|
| 1. | "How Can I Live Without My Life" | Brian Holland, Lamont Dozier | 2:57 |
| 2. | "Bring the Boys Home" | Angelo Bond, Greg Perry, General Johnson | 3:29 |
| 3. | "Cherish What Is Dear to You (While It's Near to You)" | Brian Holland, Lamont Dozier, Angelo Bond | 3:56 |
| 4. | "He's in My Life" | Ronald Dunbar, Edythe Wayne | 3:48 |
| 5. | "Band of Gold" | Ronald Dunbar, Edythe Wayne | 2:53 |
| 6. | "Just a Woman" | William Weatherspoon, Raynard Miner | 2:33 |

Side 2
| No. | Title | Writer(s) | Length |
|---|---|---|---|
| 1. | "Now Is the Time to Say Goodbye" | Scherrie Payne | 3:09 |
| 2. | "The Road We Didn't Take" | Brian Holland, Lamont Dozier, D. Dumas | 4:17 |
| 3. | "Deeper & Deeper" | Norma Toney, Ronald Dunbar, Edythe Wayne | 2:52 |
| 4. | "You're the Only Bargain I've Got" | Ronald Dunbar, Edythe Wayne, General Johnson | 3:42 |
| 5. | "Come Back" | Brian Holland, Lamont Dozier | 2:49 |
| 6. | "Through the Memory of My Mind" | William Weatherspoon | 2:40 |

== Album credits ==
- All selections published by: Gold Forever Music, Inc.

Holland-Dozier-Holland Prod., Inc.

- Executive producer: Ronald Dunbar
- Producers: Greg Perry, General Johnson, William Weatherspoon, Raynard Miner
- Arrangers: McKinley Jackson, H.B. Barnum, Tony Camillo
- Recording & Mixing: Lawrence T. Horn, Barney Perkins
- Art direction: John Hoernle

== Charts ==
Album - Billboard (North America)

| Year | Chart | Position |
|---|---|---|
| 1970 | Pop Albums | 152 |
| 1970 | Black Albums | 44 |
