= Live in Concert (Freda Payne album) =

Live album by Freda Payne
- Released: September 7, 1999
- Genre: Pop, R&B, showtunes
- Label: Varese

Freda Payne chronology
Christmas With Freda and Friends (1996)	Live in Concert (1999)	Lost in Love (2000)

Live in Concert is a recording of a live performance that Payne made in Los Angeles on November 6, 1993. It is actually an edited version of the live album An Evening With Freda Payne: Live in Concert, although six songs are longer on this album.. In this performance, Payne performs a variety of songs that were an important part in her career, particularly tracks 5 through 9. Tracks 15 through 18 is a tribute to the many female jazz singers of the 1930s and 1940s. The final track is a medley of two songs, both of which were not featured on An Evening With Freda Payne. Inside the album cover is an essay by Freda on her life and career and life in general and her special thank-yous.

== Track listing ==
No.	Title	Writer(s)	Length
1.	"Don't Rain on My Parade"	Jules Styne, Bob Merrill	4:15
2.	"I'm a Woman"	Ella McDaniel, Koko Taylor	3:01
3.	"Little Girl Blue"	Richard Rodgers, Lorenz Hart	4:10
4.	"Teach Me Tonight"	Sammy Cahn, Gene DePaul	3:27
5.	"Through the Memory of My Mind"	William Weatherspoon	1:41
6.	"Cherish What Is Dear to You"	Brian Holland, Lamont Dozier, Angelo Bond	1:23
7.	"The Road We Didn't Take"	Brian Holland, Lamont Dozier, D. Dumas	3:07
8.	"Band of Gold"	Ronald Dunbar, Edythe Wayne	2:32
9.	"Bring the Boys Home"	General Johnson, Angelo Bond, Greg Perry	2:42
10.	"It Don't Mean a Thing"	Irving Mills, Duke Ellington	2:59
11.	"Take the "A" Train"	Billy Strayhorn	4:55
12.	"In a Sentimental Mood"	Duke Ellington, Irving Mills, Manny Kurtz	3:51
13.	"Rough and Ready Man"	Hunter	4:14
14.	"Beads"	Sally Eaton, Brackman	4:19
15.	"C'est si bon"	Henri Betti, André Hornez, Jerry Seelen	4:49
16.	"Stormy Weather"	Harold Arlen, Ted Koehler	2:08
17.	"Lady Be Good"	George Gershwin, Ira Gershwin	1:14
18.	"Here's to Life"	Artie Butler, Phyllis Molinary	6:11
19.	"Who Can I Turn To?/Didn't We"	Anthony Newley, Leslie Bricusse/Webb	5:43

- Tracks 15 to 18: Impersonation medley

== Personnel ==
Album production staff

- Produced by: Dan Musselman
- Executive producer: Freda Payne
- Executive producer for Varèse Sarabande: Bruce Kimmel
- Recorded and mixed by: Al Johnson at Score One Recording, Inc., North Hollywood, CA
- Recorded live: November 6, 1993, Los Angeles
- Mastered by: Joe Gastwirt at OceanView Digital Mastering
- Cover photograph: Chris Fithian
- Package design: Andrea Sine
- With special thanks to: Cary E. Mansfield

Live show production staff

- Produced by: Denise Jackson White, Dee Jay Wyte Production and Gene Jackson, Co-Real Artists
- Production stage manager/lighting designer: Larry Oberman
- Set designer: Tom Brown
- Sound/video: Anthony Carr
- Musical director: Rahn Coleman
- Stage manager: Rebecca James
- Choreographer: Lorraine Fields
- Stage manager: Caesar Scott

Musicians

- Drums: Quinton Dennard
- Percussion: Munyungo Jackson
- Guitar: Mike O'Neal
- Sax: Charlie Owens
- Trumpet: Bobby Rodrigues
- Bass: Eddie Watkins

Singers

- Scherrie Payne
- Joyce Vincent Wilson
- Pam Vincent

Dancers

- Perry Moore
- William Wesley
