= How Do You Say I Don't Love You Anymore =

Studio album by Freda Payne
- Released: May 28, 1966
- Genre: Jazz; pop
- Label: MGM
- Producer: Tom Wilson

Freda Payne chronology
After the Lights Go Down Low and Much More!!! (1964)	How Do You Say I Don't Love You Anymore (1966)	Band of Gold (1970)

How Do You Say I Don't Love You Anymore was Freda Payne's second American album (following a release in Sweden with Don Gardner), released May 28, 1966. Although regarded primarily as a jazz album, there are also several covers of pop songs featured, including the Beatles' hit "Yesterday," "Let It Be Me," the Righteous Brothers' "You've Lost That Lovin' Feelin'," "Feeling Good," and "If You Love Me (Really Love Me)."

On 'Let It Be Me,' the bluesy treatment takes over. 'Yesterday' is delivered in approved pop standard style. Miss Payne is a versatile and polished performer who understands a lyric.

The album was reissued on CD on March 31, 2009, by Poker Records. The reissue contains a biographical essay of Payne's life and career by Mick Patrick (written in December 2008).

== Track listing ==
Side 1
No.	Title	Writer(s)	Length
1.	"(How Do You Say) I Don't Love You Anymore"	Al Kooper, Irwin Levine	2:35
2.	"Yesterday"	John Lennon, Paul McCartney	2:58
3.	"San Juan"	Ben Raleigh, Helmut Zacharias	2:26
4.	"You Never Should Have Loved Me"	Thomas Wilson	2:38
5.	"Let It Be Me"	Gilbert Bécaud, Mann Curtis, Pierre Delanoé	3:11
6.	"On Easy Street"	Larry Weiss, Fred Anisfield	2:01

Side 2
No.	Title	Writer(s)	Length
1.	"You've Lost That Lovin' Feelin'"	Phil Spector, Barry Mann, Cynthia Weil	3:14
2.	"It's Here for You"	Ted Daryll	2:55
3.	"Feeling Good"	Leslie Bricusse, Anthony Newley	3:09
4.	"Sad, Sad September"	Frank Owens	1:52
5.	"If You Love Me (Really Love Me)"	Marguerite Monnot, Geoff Parsons, Edith Piaf	2:32
6.	"Too Late"	Robert Maxwell	2:10

== Album credits ==
- Produced by: Tom Wilson
- Arranged and conducted by: Benny Golson

== CD reissue credits ==
- CD release conceived and produced by: Dave Timperley and Mick Patrick
- Thanks to: Paul Robinson, Jon Roberts, Anna Dueweke, Leee Puddefoot, Kevin Phelan
- Special thanks to: David Cole of "In the Basement" (www.basement-group.co.uk)
- Labels and memorabilia courtesy of: Dave Timperley
- Mastered by: Nick Robbins at Sound Mastering Ltd.
- Package designed by: Jane Vallero at Blue Line Design Ltd. (www.blueline-design-co.uk)
