= Come See About Me (Freda Payne album) =

Studio album by Freda Payne
- Released: February 27, 2001
- Recorded: Fall 2000
- Studio: Fantasy Studios (Berkeley, California)
- Genre: Pop, R&B, jazz
- Length: 48:15
- Label: Volt Records
- Producer: F.L. Pittman, Preston Glass

Freda Payne chronology
Band of Gold: The Best of Freda Payne (2000)	Come See About Me (2001)	Unhooked Generation: The Complete Invictus Recordings (2001)

Professional ratings
Review scores
Source	Rating
AllMusic	3/5 stars

Come See About Me was Freda Payne's fifteenth studio album and her first in five years. The album itself is a combination of the musical styles of pop, R&B, and jazz. Primarily a cover album, this album contains only five original songs: "Let's Make Beautiful Music", "First Impression", "I Live for New York City", "You Complete Me", and "Just Like That" (the last of which is a duet with the Temptations' Ali-Ollie Woodson). Inside the album cover is an essay written by Lee Hildebrand in December 2000 that discusses Payne's life and career and personal comments by Payne herself.

== Track listing ==
No.	Title	Writer(s)	Length
1.	"Let's Make Beautiful Music"	Preston Glass, Garitano, Rivera	4:07
2.	"(It Looks Like) I'll Never Fall in Love Again"	Currie, Donegan	4:39
3.	"First Impression"	Steve Fontano	3:04
4.	"I Live for New York City"	Fred Pittman	4:58
5.	"At This Moment"	Billy Vera	3:42
6.	"You Turned the Tables on Me"	Louis Alter, Sidney Mitchell	4:10
7.	"You Complete Me"	Preston Glass, Appling	4:25
8.	"Come See About Me"	Eddie Holland, Lamont Dozier, Brian Holland	3:39
9.	"I Couldn't Live Without Your Love"	Tony Hatch, Jackie Trent	4:52
10.	"Nice to Be With You"	Jim Gold	5:30
11.	"Just Like That" (duet with Ali-Ollie Woodson)	Ja'll, Pilate	4:22

- "Just Like That" is a duet with Ali-Ollie Woodson with Preston Glass and Karen Newman on background vocals.

== Personnel ==
- Freda Payne – lead vocals
- Mic Gillette – trumpet, trombone
- George Brooks – saxophones
- Ray Obeido – guitars
- Preston Glass – keyboards, sitar, electric guitar, drum and synthesizer programming
- Steve Fontano – keyboards, programming whistle
- Troy Luccketta – drums
- Roberta Freeman, Angel Sessions, Preston Glass – background vocals

Production

- Arrangements by Preston Glass except track 3 by Steve Fontano
- Produced by F.L. Pittman and Preston Glass (track 3 co-produced by Steve Fontano) except track 11 produced by F.L. Pittman and Felton Pilate
- Executive producer: Phil Jones
- Recording and mixing engineer: Steve Fontano
- Additional engineering: Stephen Hart
- Mastering: George Horn (Fantasy)
- Art direction, design: Jamie Putnam
- Photography: Steve Maruta
- Wardrobe and jewelry: L.S.O. Designs
- Recorded (Fall 2000) at Fantasy Studios, Berkeley
