= Hot (Freda Payne album) =

Studio album by Freda Payne
- Released: 1979
- Genre: Pop, R&B
- Label: Capitol
- Producer: John Florez, Dr. Cecil Hale

Freda Payne chronology
Supernatural High (1978)	Hot (1979)	Greatest Hits (1991)

Hot is an album by the American musician Freda Payne. It was released in 1979 via Capitol Records. Although she did record a few singles during the 1980s (including three for Ian Levine's UK Motorcity label), it would be 16 years before Payne released another studio album.

== Critical reception ==
Professional ratings
Review scores
Source	Rating
The Virgin Encyclopedia of R&B and Soul	2/5 stars

The Kansas City Star wrote that Payne moves "flawlessly through several sizzling disco tunes and a couple of enchanting ballads."

== Track listing ==
Side 1
No.	Title	Writer(s)	Length
1.	"Red Hot"	N. Fortier, C. Wyatt	7:01
2.	"Can't Wait"	John Lewis Parker, Catherine M. Lord, Franne Golde	4:20
3.	"Gotta Keep Dancin'"	Charles Richard Cason	5:28

Side 2
No.	Title	Writer(s)	Length
1.	"Savin' It (Save and Spend)"	J. Wieder, J. Fottman	5:40
2.	"Something's Missing (In My Life)"	Jay Asher, Paul Jabara	5:21
3.	"The Longest Night"	Nat Kipner, John Capek	4:38
4.	"Hungry" (from the musical Daddy Goodness)	Ron Miller, Kenneth Hirsch	4:40

== Personnel ==
Adapted from liner notes.

- "Red Hot," "Can't Wait," "Gotta Keep Dancin'," "Savin' It (Save and Spend)," "Something's Missing (In My Life)," "The Longest Night" produced by: John Florez & Dr. Cecil Hale
- "Hungry" produced by: Dr. Cecil Hale
- "Red Hot," "Can't Wait," "Something's Missing (In My Life)," "The Longest Night" arranged by: Pete Robinson
- "Can't Wait" and "The Longest Night" arranged by: Bruce Miller and Pete Robinson
- "Gotta Keep Dancin'" and "Savin' It (Save and Spend)" arranged by: Bruce Miller
- Recorded at the Sound Factory, Kendun Recorders, Hollywood Sound Recorders, Filmways/Heider Studios, KSR Studios and Capitol Recording Studios
- Engineers: Serge Reyes, Jeff Sykes, Grover Helsley, Steve Williams, George Sloan, Charles Faris
- Mixed by: Dr. Cecil Hale
- Re-mix engineer: Charles Faris
- Assistants: Butch Lynch, Randy Pipes, Billyann Swopes, Chris McNary and John Taylor
- Production assistance: Pete Robinson

Musicians

- Drums: James Gadson, Quentin Dennard
- Keyboards: Pete Robinson, Ron Coleman
- Guitars: Lee Ritenour, Ron Cook, Bob "Boogie" Bowles, Paul M. Jackson, Jr.
- Percussion: Joe Clayton, Alan Estes, Paulinho da Costa, Bob Zimmitti
- Bass: Abraham Laboriel, Kevin Brandon
- Background vocals: Scherrie Payne, Joyce Vincent Wilson, Susan Sheridan, Laura Creamer, Andrea Robinson and Freda Payne
- Art direction: Roy Kohara
- Photography: Phil Fewsmith
- Design: Phil Shima
