= Shake You Down =

Single by Gregory Abbott

from the album Shake You Down
- B-side: "Wait Until Tomorrow"
- Released: August 1986
- Genre: R&B; smooth soul
- Length: 4:05
- Label: Columbia
- Songwriter: Gregory Abbott
- Producer: Gregory Abbott

Gregory Abbott singles chronology
| "Shake You Down" (1986) | "I Got the Feelin' (It's Over)" (1987) |

Music video
- "Shake You Down" on YouTube

"Shake You Down" is a song by American R&B artist, writer and producer Gregory Abbott. It was released in August 1986 as the lead single from his debut album of the same name. It became Abbott's biggest hit and was certified platinum by the RIAA. The track is also featured in the 2007 film Are We Done Yet?

The song went to number one on the black singles chart in October 1986, and on January 17, 1987, it reached the top spot on the Billboard Hot 100 singles chart. Billboard ranked it as the No. 3 song for 1987. It was a hit across the Atlantic Ocean as well, peaking at number six in the UK Singles Chart (spending a total of 13 weeks on that chart from 22 November 1986). It was not intended as the original single to promote the album, as "I Got the Feeling" was scheduled to be the first single. It was postponed as the follow-up, peaking at #56.

== Composition ==
According to Billboard, the song is about sex.

== Music video ==
Dominic Sena of Propaganda Films came up with the idea of the scrolling effect on the music video. It is recorded as a single image on a photographic film.

There is also another music video recorded in Rio de Janeiro, especially for the Brazilian TV show Fantástico.

== Charts ==
=== Weekly charts ===
Weekly chart performance for "Shake You Down"
| Chart (1986–1987) | Peak position |
|---|---|
| Austria (Ö3 Austria Top 40) | 18 |
| Belgium (Ultratop 50 Flanders) | 7 |
| Canada (The Record) | 4 |
| Canada Top Singles (RPM) | 2 |
| Ireland (IRMA) | 5 |
| Netherlands (Dutch Top 40) | 3 |
| Netherlands (Single Top 100) | 5 |
| New Zealand (Recorded Music NZ) | 1 |
| Spain (AFYVE) | 1 |
| Switzerland (Schweizer Hitparade) | 15 |
| UK Singles (Official Charts) | 6 |
| US Adult Contemporary (Billboard) | 2 |
| US Billboard Hot 100 | 1 |
| US Dance Singles Sales (Billboard) | 13 |
| US Hot R&B/Hip-Hop Songs (Billboard) | 1 |
| West Germany (GfK) | 13 |

=== Year-end charts ===
1986 year-end chart performance for "Shake You Down"
| Chart (1986) | Position |
|---|---|
| UK Singles (OCC) | 87 |

1987 year-end chart performance for "Shake You Down"
| Chart (1987) | Position |
|---|---|
| Australia (Kent Music Report) | 78 |
| Belgium (Ultratop 50 Flanders) | 75 |
| Canada Top Singles (RPM) | 19 |
| European Hot 100 Singles (Music & Media) | 80 |
| Netherlands (Dutch Top 40) | 20 |
| Netherlands (Single Top 100) | 23 |
| New Zealand (Recorded Music NZ) | 24 |
| US Adult Contemporary (Billboard) | 27 |
| US Billboard Hot 100 | 3 |
| US Cash Box Top 100 | 34 |
