= Contact (Freda Payne album) =

Studio album by Freda Payne
- Released: 1971
- Genres: Pop, R&B
- Label: Invictus
- Producers: Greg Perry, William Weatherspoon, Ronald Dunbar

Freda Payne chronology
Band of Gold (1970)	Contact (1971)	The Best of Freda Payne (1972)

Contact is Freda Payne's fourth American released album and her second for Invictus Records. The album was released in 1971. The majority of the material on this album contains sad themes, with the exception of "You Brought the Joy." The album begins with a dramatic 11-minute medley of "I'm Not Getting Any Better" and "Suddenly It's Yesterday," both of which were written by Brian Holland and Lamont Dozier. Some people thought that Holland and Dozier were trying to compete with Diana Ross's hit "Ain't No Mountain High Enough" as both songs contain spoken segments and dramatic musical arrangements. The only cover song is "He's in My Life", which was an album track by The Glass House featuring Freda's sister Scherrie Payne. It was written by Brian Holland, Lamont Dozier and Eddie Holland (under their common pseudonym "Edythe Wayne" to avoid copyright claims by their former employer Motown), jointly with Ron Dunbar.

== Reception ==
Professional ratings
Review scores
Source	Rating
AllMusic	4.5/5 stars

Ron Wynn of AllMusic gave the album 4.5 stating "She found her niche in the early '70s, doing silky, sophisticated pop/soul with excellent production, arrangements, and material supplied by the Holland/Dozier/Holland team."

The track, "Bring the Boys Home", was the album's most popular hit, going to No. 3 and selling a million copies.

== Track listing ==
Side 1
No.	Title	Writer(s)	Length
1.	"I'm Not Getting Any Better"	Brian Holland, Lamont Dozier	6:45
2.	"Suddenly It's Yesterday"	Brian Holland, Lamont Dozier	4:24
3.	"You Brought the Joy"	Brian Holland, Lamont Dozier	3:00
4.	"Bring The Boys Home"	Angelo Bond, General Johnson, Greg Perry	3:22
5.	"You've Got to Love Somebody (Let It Be Me)"	William Weatherspoon, Raynard Miner	3:01

Side 2
No.	Title	Writer(s)	Length
1.	"Prelude"	Brian Holland, Lamont Dozier	0:53
2.	"The Road We Didn't Take"	Brian Holland, Lamont Dozier, D. Dumas	4:17
3.	"Odds and Ends"	General Johnson, Greg Perry	3:50
4.	"Cherish What Is Dear to You (While It's Near to You)"	Brian Holland, Lamont Dozier, Angelo Bond	3:56
5.	"I Shall Not Be Moved"	Brian Holland, Lamont Dozier	2:43
6.	"Mama's Gone"	General Johnson, Greg Perry, Ronald Dunbar	3:23

- Later pressings contain the 1971 hit "Bring the Boys Home" in place of "He's In My Life" as the fourth track on side one.

== Album credits ==
Adapted from liner notes.

- All songs published by: Gold Forever Music Inc., BMI
- Produced by: Greg Perry, William Weatherspoon and Ronald Dunbar
- Arrangers: H.B. Barnum, McKinley Jackson and Tony Camillo
- Engineers: Lawrence T. Horn, Barney Perkins
- Album design/concept: CRAIGBRAUNINC
- Photography: Steve Berman
- Jacket/poster: Mfg'd by SOUND PACKAGING CORP.

== Charts ==
Album

Chart (1970)	Peak position
Pop Albums	76
Black Albums	12

Singles

Single	Chart (1971)	Peak position
"Cherish What Is Dear to You (While It's Near to You)"	Black Singles	11
"Cherish What Is Dear to You (While It's Near to You)"	Pop Singles	44
"Cherish What Is Dear to You (While It's Near to You)"	UK Singles Chart	46
"Bring the Boys Home"	Black Singles	3
"Bring the Boys Home"	Pop Singles	12
"You Brought the Joy"	Black Singles	21
"You Brought the Joy"	Pop Singles	52

Single	Chart (1972)	Peak position
"The Road We Didn't Take"	Pop Singles	100
