= Bring the Boys Home =

1971 single by Freda Payne

Single by Freda Payne

from the album Contact
- B-side: "I Shall Not Be Moved"
- Released: May 1971
- Genre: Soul
- Length: 3:08
- Label: Invictus
- Songwriters: Angelo Bond, General Johnson, Greg Perry
- Producer: Greg Perry

Freda Payne singles chronology
"Cherish What Is Dear to You (While It's Near To You)"	"Bring the Boys Home"	"You Brought the Joy"

"Bring the Boys Home" is a song recorded by rhythm and blues singer Freda Payne in 1971 during the Vietnam War era. It was an anti-war song that was aimed at the sending of troops to fight in an increasingly unpopular war.

== Background ==
The song was produced by Greg Perry and released on the Invictus label. It was backed with "I Shall Not Be Moved". The song came out at a time when soldiers were returning to America dead and in body bags. A higher than normal number of the soldiers were black. The soldiers were only boys at the age of 20, which was the average age that many of them were killed. In spite of the healthy amount of airplay it received in the US, the US Command from the American Forces Network banned it. The reason given was that it would be of benefit to the enemy. A total of 50,000 copies of the album Contact were pressed before it was added to the album after it became a hit. It replaced "He's In My Life" which was the first track on side 1.

The Soul Source section of the May 22 issue of Billboard named it the best new record of the week.

== Weekly charts ==
By July 10, the single had reached number three on the Billboard soul singles chart. The song spent 13 weeks on the Hot 100, peaking at No. 12.

=== Chart performance ===
Chart (1971)	Peak position
US Billboard Hot 100	12
US Best Selling Soul Singles (Billboard)	3

== Certifications ==
Region	Certification	Certified units/sales
United States (RIAA)	Gold	1,008,000
