= Band of Gold (album) =

Studio album by Freda Payne
- Released: August 1970
- Studios: HDH Sound Studios, Detroit, Michigan
- Genre: R&B
- Label: Invictus
- Producer: William Weatherspoon

Freda Payne chronology
How Do You Say I Don't Love You Anymore (1966)	Band of Gold (1970)	Contact (1971)

Professional ratings
Review scores
Source	Rating
AllMusic	4.5/5 stars
Christgau's Record Guide	C+
The Encyclopedia of Popular Music	3/5 stars

Band of Gold is the third studio album by Freda Payne. Her first for Invictus Records, it was released in 1970. The title track became an instant smash on the Pop charts in the US and the UK. Other hits included "Unhooked Generation" (released before "Band of Gold") and "Deeper and Deeper". The tenth track was written by Payne's younger sister, Scherrie Payne. Cover versions include Gary Puckett and the Union Gap's hit "This Girl Is a Woman Now" and Andy Williams' hit "Happy Heart".

The album peaked at No. 60 on the Billboard 200. "Band of Gold" reached No. 1 on the UK Singles Chart. It, and "Deeper and Deeper", have sold more than a million copies worldwide.

== Critical reception ==
AllMusic called the album "a masterpiece of epic proportions," writing that "the overall sonic tone of Band of Gold reflects [Payne's] producers' Motown history."

== Track listing ==
Side 1
No.	Title	Writer(s)	Length
1.	"Band of Gold"	Ron Dunbar, Edythe Wayne	2:53
2.	"I Left Some Dreams Back There"	Norma Toney, Ron Dunbar	3:17
3.	"Deeper and Deeper"	Norma Toney, Ron Dunbar, Edythe Wayne	2:52
4.	"Rock Me in the Cradle"	Ron Dunbar, General Johnson, Gregg Perry	3:03
5.	"Unhooked Generation"	Ron Dunbar, Edythe Wayne	2:29
6.	"Love on Borrowed Time"	William Weatherspoon	2:58

Side 2
No.	Title	Writer(s)	Length
1.	"Through the Memory of My Mind"	William Weatherspoon	2:40
2.	"This Girl Is a Woman Now"	Alan Bernstein, Vic Millrose	2:59
3.	"The World Don't Owe You a Thing"	Brian Holland, Lamont Dozier	2:58
4.	"Now Is the Time to Say Goodbye"	Scherrie Payne	3:09
5.	"Happy Heart"	Wayne P. Walker	2:49
6.	"The Easiest Way to Fall"	Ron Dunbar, Edythe Wayne, Scheerie Lavette	2:36

== Personnel ==
- Recorded at: Holland-Dozier-Holland Sound Studios, Inc.
- L.T. Horn – recording engineer
- Processed by: Syntrex
- William Weatherspoon – production supervision
- Bob Wortham – cover photography

== Charts ==
=== Album ===
Chart (1970)	Peak position
Canada Top Albums/CDs (RPM)	40
US Billboard 200	60
US Top R&B/Hip-Hop Albums (Billboard)	17

=== Singles ===
Year	Single	Chart	Position
1970	"Unhooked Generation"	Black Singles	43
1970	"Band of Gold"	Pop Singles	3
1970	"Band of Gold"	Black Singles	20
1970	"Band of Gold"	UK Singles Chart	1
1970	"Deeper and Deeper"	Pop Singles	24
1970	"Deeper and Deeper"	Black Singles	9
1970	"Deeper and Deeper"	UK Singles Chart	33
