= Payne & Pleasure =

Studio album by Freda Payne
- Released: 1974
- Genres: Pop, R&B
- Label: ABC/Dunhill
- Producer: McKinley Jackson

Freda Payne chronology
Reaching Out (1973)	Payne & Pleasure (1974)	Out of Payne Comes Love (1975)

Professional ratings
Review scores
Source	Rating
Allmusic	4.5/5 stars

Payne & Pleasure is Freda Payne's fifth American-released album and her first for the ABC/Dunhill label, released in 1974 (ABC owned Payne's previous label, Impulse! Records as well). The album was produced by McKinley Jackson. It consists of four songs co-written by Lamont Dozier's brother, Reginald ("Reggie"), along with three covers (the Carpenters' hit "I Won't Last a Day Without You," "The Way We Were" [from the film of the same name], and Leon Russell's "A Song for You"). The album was reissued on CD on November 17, 2009. The reissue contains a biographical essay (sourced by interviews with Freda Payne and Lamont Dozier) of Payne's life and career by A. Scott Galloway.

== Track listing ==
Side A
No.	Title	Writer(s)	Length
1.	"It's Yours to Have"	Reginald Dozier, McKinley Jackson	4:15
2.	"Didn't I Tell You"	Reginald Dozier, Althea King	3:28
3.	"I Get Carried Away"	Reginald Dozier, Althea King	4:19
4.	"Run for Your Life"	McKinley Jackson, Barney Perkins	3:29
5.	"Don't Wanna Be Left Out"	Reginald Dozier, McKinley Jackson	6:32

Side B
No.	Title	Writer(s)	Length
1.	"Shadows on the Wall"	McKinley Jackson, Barney Perkins	5:07
2.	"I Won't Last a Day Without You"	Paul Williams, Roger Nichols	4:29
3.	"The Way We Were"	Marvin Hamlisch, Alan and Marilyn Bergman	3:42
4.	"A Song for You"	Leon Russell	5:52

== Personnel ==
- Adapted from liner notes.
- Produced by: Mckinley Jackson

Musicians on "It's Yours to Have," "Didn't I Tell You," "Run for Your Life"

- Guitars: Ray Parker Jr. and Dennis Budimir
- Bass guitar: Scott Edwards
- Grand piano: Joe Sample
- Vibes: Emil Richards
- Organ: Huby Heard
- WHP Wahguitar: Melvin "Wah-Wah" Ragin
- Drums: Kenny "Spike" Rice

Musicians on "A Song for You," "Shadows on the Wall"

- Grand piano: Joe Sample
- Guitars: Dennis Budimir and Ray Parker Jr.
- Bass guitar: Scott Edwards
- Drums: Ed Greene
- Vibes: Emil Richards
- Congo: Leslie Bass

Musicians on "I Get Carried Away," "Don't Wanna Be Left Out," "I Won't Last a Day Without You," "The Way We Were"

- Bass guitar: Scott Edwards
- Drums: Ed Greene
- Electric and grand piano: Joe Sample
- Harpsichord: Gene Page
- Vibes: Emil Richards
- Guitars: Melvin "Wah-Wah" Ragin, Ray Parker Jr., Don Peake
- Organ: Huby Heard

Solo work by:

- Jesse Ehrlich - cello: "A Song for You"
- Joe Sample - piano: "Run for Your Life"
- Huby Heard - organ: "Don't Wanna Be Left Out"
- Ernest Watts - tenor saxophone and flute: "A Song for You"
- Background vocals: Shirley Jones, Edna Wright, Marti McCall, Julia Tillman, Myrna Matthews, Clydie King
- Arranged and orchestrated by: Lamont Dozier
- Recording engineers: Barney Perkins, Reginald Dozier
- Mixing engineer: Barney Perkins
- Musician contractor: Olivia Page (Beautiful)
- Background contractors: Edna Wright, Marti McCall
- Copying supervisors: George Annis, Marion Sherrill
- Front and back cover photography: Harry Langdon for ABC Records
- Inside photos: Harry Langdon, courtesy of Shooting Star Gallery, Los Angeles

== CD reissue credits ==
- Reissue supervision: Paul Williams
- Project coordination: Howard Tucker, Universal Music Enterprises
- Mastered by: Bill Lacey at Digital Sound & Picture, New York
- CD design: Chris Eselgroth / FourEyes Studio
- Memorabilia and label scans: John Lester, The Reel Music Archives
- Thanks to: Harry Weinger, Scott Ravine, Allison Sundberg
- Special thanks: Freda Payne and Lamont Dozier
