= Gregory Abbott =

American musician (born 1954)

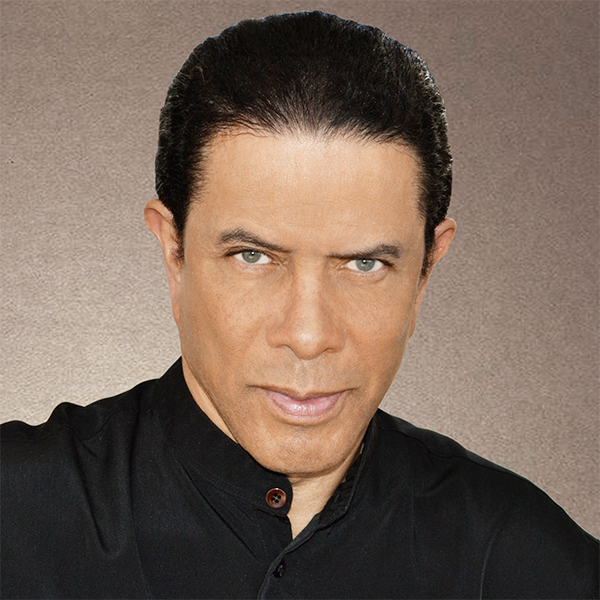
- Abbott in 2016

Background information
- Born: Gregory Joel Abbott; April 2, 1954 (age 72); New York City, U.S.
- Genres: R&B; soul; adult contemporary
- Occupations: Singer; musician; composer; record producer
- Instruments: Vocals; keyboard; piano; drums
- Years active: 1982–present
- Labels: Columbia; Legacy; Mojo Man Entertainment
- Website: gregoryabbott.com

Gregory Joel Abbott (born April 2, 1954) is an American singer, musician, composer and producer. Although he continues to record to date, he is best known for his singles in the mid-1980s including his platinum single, "Shake You Down", from his 1986 debut album.

== Early life ==
Abbott was born in Harlem, New York. Abbott's parents were from Venezuela and Antigua. During his early years, Abbott's mother taught him how to play piano and encouraged him to develop vocally. Before his career as a musician, Abbott studied psychology at the University of California, Berkeley, and creative writing at Stanford; where he won a Wallace Stegner fellowship. Before becoming a musician, Abbott taught as a professor of English at the University of California, Berkeley.

== Career ==
One of Abbott's first opportunities in his studio was an album for an independent record label, which gave him the opportunity to do a duet with Whitney Houston. Continuing on, Abbott produced for the group EQ on Atlantic Records. In 1986, Abbott released his first solo album, Shake You Down. The title track for the album was a success, going platinum and topping the Billboard Hot 100. The album's second single, "I Got the Feelin' (It's Over)", reached Number 5 on the R&B chart. On the strength of its singles, the album reached platinum status and earned Abbott several awards.

Internationally, Abbott has also had success, winning first prize at the Tokyo Music Festival. The title track of his second album, I'll Prove It to You, which was released in 1988, was featured on a Japanese movie soundtrack. In Belgium, he performed with Princess Stephanie of Monaco. Over the years much of his new music has been released via his own Mojo Man Entertainment label. Abbott has continued with his R&B sound, but he added a Caribbean influence to his 1996 album One World! The same influence followed his R&B/jazz-oriented independent album Eyes, Whispers, Rhythm, Sex... in 2002. Abbott's most recent album entitled Drop Your Mask was released in 2011. Abbott continues to release singles including a smooth jazz song "Chill" featuring saxophonist Gerald Albright.

== Personal life ==
Abbott was married to American singer Freda Payne from 1976 until 1979. Their son, Gregory Joel Abbott, Jr., was born in 1977. Abbott has another son from a previous marriage.

== Discography ==
=== Studio albums ===
Year	Album	Label	Peak chart positions		
Year	Album	Label	US	US R&B	UK
1986	Shake You Down	Columbia Records	22	5	53
1988	I'll Prove It to You	Columbia Records	132	17	—
1996	One World!	Musik International	—	—	—
2002	Eyes, Whispers, Rhythm, Sex...	Musik International	—	—	—
2011	Drop Your Mask	Spectra Records	—	—	—
"—" denotes releases that did not chart or were not released in that territory.

=== Singles ===
Year	Title	Chart positions			
Year	Title	US	US R&B	US Adult Con.	UK
1986	"Shake You Down"	1	1	2	6
1986	"I Got the Feelin' (It's Over)"	56	5	25	76
1986	"You're My Angel"	—	—	—	—
1988	"I'll Prove It to You"	—	5	35	—
1988	"Let Me Be Your Hero"	—	34	—	—
"—" denotes releases that did not chart or were not released in that territory.

=== Compilation albums ===
- Super Hits (Legacy Recordings, 1998)
- Rhyme and Reason (Sony Music, 2006)
